= 1991 Los Angeles Raiders season =

NFL team season

- Owner: Al Davis
- General manager: Al Davis
- Head coach: Art Shell
- Offensive coordinator: Terry Robiskie
- Defensive coordinator: Dave Adolph
- Home stadium: L.A. Memorial Coliseum

Results
- Record: 9–7
- Division place: 3rd AFC West
- Playoffs: Lost Wild Card Playoffs (at Chiefs) 6–10

The 1991 Los Angeles Raiders season was their 32nd in the National Football League (NFL). They were unable to improve upon their previous season's output of 12–4, winning only nine games. After a 9–4 start, the team lost its last three games but did qualify for the playoffs for the second straight season. The Raiders were inconsistent offensively, with struggling quarterback Jay Schroeder eventually benched in favor of rookie Todd Marinovich for both the regular season finale and the playoff game. Amidst a feud with owner Al Davis, future Hall of Famer Marcus Allen's role was restricted mainly to backing up newly acquired Roger Craig. Despite starting just one game, Tim Brown received his second Pro Bowl selection. This was the first season without Bo Jackson, who had suffered a career-ending injury the previous year. A solid defense was led by Howie Long, Greg Townsend (13 sacks) and Ronnie Lott (8 interceptions).

== Offseason ==
=== NFL draft ===
1991 Los Angeles Raiders draft
Round	Pick	Player	Position	College	Notes
1	24	Todd Marinovich	Quarterback	USC	
2	43	Nick Bell	Running back	Iowa	
4	100	Raghib Ismail	Wide receiver	Notre Dame	
6	146	Nolan Harrison	Defensive tackle	Indiana	
Made roster

== Staff ==
1991 Los Angeles Raiders staff
Front office: President of the General Partner – Al Davis; Director of Football Operations – Steve Ortmayer; Senior Executive – John Herrera; Head coaches: Head coach – Art Shell; Offensive coaches: Offense – Tom Walsh; Quarterbacks – Mike White; Offensive backs – Joe Scannella; Tight ends – Terry Robiskie; Wide receivers – Fred Biletnikoff; Offensive line – Kim Helton	Defensive coaches: Defense/Linebackers – Dave Adolph; Defensive line – Earl Leggett; Linebackers – Gunther Cunningham; Defensive backs – Odis McKinney; Defensive backs – Jack Stanton; Special teams coaches: Special teams – Steve Ortmayer; Strength and conditioning: Strength and conditioning – Todd Sperber; Strength and conditioning – Doug Wilkerson

== Roster ==
1991 Los Angeles Raiders roster
Quarterbacks (QB): 11 Vince Evans; 12 Todd Marinovich; 13 Jay Schroeder; Running backs (RB): 32 Marcus Allen; 38 Nick Bell; 22 Roger Craig; 41 Napoleon McCallum; 35 Steve Smith FB; Wide receivers (WR): 81 Tim Brown PR; 86 Mervyn Fernandez; 83 Willie Gault; 85 Sam Graddy KR; 82 Jamie Holland KR; Tight ends (TE): 87 Andrew Glover; 88 Ethan Horton	Offensive linemen (OL): 73 James FitzPatrick G/T; 77 Reggie McElroy G; 65 Max Montoya G; 72 Don Mosebar C; 68 Bruce Wilkerson T; 76 Steve Wisniewski G; 66 Steve Wright T; Defensive linemen (DL): 70 Scott Davis DT; 79 Bob Golic DT; 74 Nolan Harrison DE; 61 Roy Hart DT; 75 Howie Long DE; 94 Anthony Smith DE/DT; 93 Greg Townsend DE	Linebackers (LB): 58 Thomas Benson OLB; 50 Riki Ellison MLB; 52 Mike Jones MLB; 99 Winston Moss OLB; 57 Jerry Robinson OLB; 51 Aaron Wallace OLB; Defensive backs (DB): 33 Eddie Anderson FS; 23 Derrick Crudup FS; 46 Torin Dorn CB; 25 Dan Land CB/S; 21 Garry Lewis CB; 42 Ronnie Lott SS; 36 Terry McDaniel CB; 43 Elvis Patterson SS; 48 Lionel Washington CB; Special teams (ST): 7 Jeff Gossett P; 18 Jeff Jaeger K; 67 Dan Turk LS	Practice squad: 29 Dennis Johnson CB; 63 Josh Taotoai C; 40 Marcus Wilson RB; Reserve: 84 Mike Dyal TE (PUP); 60 Rory Graves T (IR); 58 A. J. Jimerson LB (IR); 31 Vance Mueller RB (IR); 71 Joel Patten T (IR); 47 active, 5 inactive, 3 practice squad Rookies in italics

== Preseason ==
Week	Date	Opponent	Result	Record	Venue	Attendance
1	July 27	San Francisco 49ers	L 17–24	0–1	Los Angeles Memorial Coliseum	45,365
2	August 4	vs. Miami Dolphins	L 17–19	0–2	Tokyo Dome	51,122
3	August 12	at Dallas Cowboys	W 17–12	1–2	Texas Stadium	55,981
4	August 17	Chicago Bears	W 13–10	2–2	Los Angeles Memorial Coliseum	35,538
5	August 23	San Diego Chargers	W 17–7	3–2	Jack Murphy Stadium	48,509

== Regular season ==
=== Schedule ===
Week	Date	Opponent	Result	Record	Venue	Attendance	Recap
1	September 1	at Houston Oilers	**L** 17–47	0–1	Astrodome	61,367	Recap
2	September 8	**Denver Broncos**	**W** 16–13	1–1	Los Angeles Memorial Coliseum	48,569	Recap
3	September 15	Indianapolis Colts	**W** 16–0	2–1	Los Angeles Memorial Coliseum	40,287	Recap
4	September 22	at Atlanta Falcons	**L** 17–21	2–2	Atlanta–Fulton County Stadium	53,615	Recap
5	September 29	San Francisco 49ers	**W** 12–6	3–2	Los Angeles Memorial Coliseum	91,494	Recap
6	October 6	**San Diego Chargers**	**L** 13–21	3–3	Los Angeles Memorial Coliseum	42,787	Recap
7	October 13	at **Seattle Seahawks**	**W** 23–20 (OT)	4–3	Kingdome	61,974	Recap
8	October 20	Los Angeles Rams	**W** 20–17	5–3	Los Angeles Memorial Coliseum	85,102	Recap
9	October 28	at **Kansas City Chiefs**	**L** 21–24	5–4	Arrowhead Stadium	77,111	Recap
10	Bye						
11	November 10	at **Denver Broncos**	**W** 17–16	6–4	Mile High Stadium	75,896	Recap
12	November 17	**Seattle Seahawks**	**W** 31–7	7–4	Los Angeles Memorial Coliseum	49,317	Recap
13	November 24	at Cincinnati Bengals	**W** 38–14	8–4	Riverfront Stadium	52,044	Recap
14	December 1	at **San Diego Chargers**	**W** 9–7	9–4	Jack Murphy Stadium	56,780	Recap
15	December 8	Buffalo Bills	**L** 27–30 (OT)	9–5	Los Angeles Memorial Coliseum	85,081	Recap
16	December 16	at New Orleans Saints	**L** 0–27	9–6	Louisiana Superdome	68,625	Recap
17	December 22	**Kansas City Chiefs**	**L** 21–27	9–7	Los Angeles Memorial Coliseum	65,144	Recap
Note: Intra-division opponents are in **bold** text.

=== Season summary ===
==== Week 1 at Oilers ====
Week One: Los Angeles Raiders (0–0) at Houston Oilers (0–0)

Quarter	1	2	3	4	Total
Raiders	0	7	3	7	**17**
**Oilers**	6	10	21	10	**47**

at Astrodome, Houston, Texas

- Date: September 1
- Game time: 4:00 p.m.
- Game weather: Indoors (dome)
- Game attendance: 61,367
- Box Score, Box Score

Game information

First quarter

- HOU – Allen Pinkett 8-yard run (kick failed), 5:37. Oilers 6–0.

Second quarter

- HOU – Warren Moon 1-yard run (Ian Howfield kick), 13:40. Oilers 13–0.
- HOU – Ian Howfield 34-yard field goal, 5:27. Oilers 16–0.
- LA – Willie Gault 59-yard pass from Jay Schroeder (Jeff Jaeger kick), 2:44. Oilers 16–7.

Third quarter

- HOU – Ernest Givins 22-yard pass from Warren Moon (Ian Howfield kick), 12:17. Oilers 23–7.
- LA – Jeff Jaeger 39-yard field goal, 7:24. Oilers 23–10.
- HOU – Tony Jones 28-yard pass from Warren Moon (Ian Howfield kick), 5:59. Oilers 30–10.
- HOU – Mike Dumas 19-yard fumble return (Ian Howfield kick), 3:45. Oilers 37–10.

Fourth quarter

- HOU – Ian Howfield 46-yard field goal, 9:43. Oilers 40–10.
- LA – Sam Graddy 80-yard pass from Vince Evans (Jeff Jaeger kick), 9:29. Oilers 40–10.
- HOU – Gary Brown 39-yard run (Ian Howfield kick), 1:52. Oilers 47–10.

Top passers

- LA – Vince Evans – 6/10, 127 yards, TD, INT
- HOU – Warren Moon – 18/33, 250 yards, 2 TD

Top rushers

- LA – Marcus Allen – 8 rushes, 17 yards
- HOU – Allen Pinkett – 26 rushes, 144 yards

Top receivers

- LA – Sam Graddy – 3 receptions, 102 yards, TD
- HOU – Ernest Givins – 6 receptions, 90 yards, TD

==== Week 2 vs Broncos ====
Week Two: Denver Broncos (1–0) at Los Angeles Raiders (0–1)

Quarter	1	2	3	4	Total
Broncos	3	3	0	7	**13**
**Raiders**	0	3	7	6	**16**

at Los Angeles Memorial Coliseum, Los Angeles, California

- Date: September 8
- Game time: 4:00 p.m. EST
- Game weather: 65 °F (18 °C)
- Game attendance: 48,569
- Box Score, Box Score

Game information

First quarter

- DEN – David Treadwell 22-yard field goal, 2:29. Broncos 3–0.

Second quarter

- DEN – David Treadwell 47-yard field goal, 13:11. Broncos 6–0.
- LA – Jeff Jaeger 29-yard field goal, 6:23. Broncos 6–3.

Third quarter

- LA – Willie Gault 16-yard pass from Jay Schroeder (Jeff Jaeger kick), 5:47. Raiders 10–6.

Fourth quarter

- LA – Jeff Jaeger 23-yard field goal, 9:17. Raiders 13–6.
- LA – Jeff Jaeger 34-yard field goal, 2:48. Raiders 16–6.
- DEN – Steve Sewell 3-yard pass from John Elway (David Treadwell kick), 0:25. Raiders 16–10.

Top passers

- DEN – John Elway – 15/29, 240 yards, TD
- LA – Jay Schroeder – 12/19, 168 yards, TD

Top rushers

- DEN – Gaston Green – 11 rushes, 25 yards
- LA – Roger Craig – 27 rushes, 99 yards

Top receivers

- DEN – Steve Sewell – 3 receptions, 50 yards, TD
- LA – Willie Gault – 3 receptions, 69 yards, TD

=== Standings ===
AFC West
	W	L	T	PCT	DIV	CONF	PF	PA	STK
^{(2)} Denver Broncos	12	4	0	.750	5–3	10–4	304	235	W4
^{(4)} Kansas City Chiefs	10	6	0	.625	6–2	8–4	322	252	W1
^{(5)} Los Angeles Raiders	9	7	0	.563	5–3	7–5	298	297	L3
Seattle Seahawks	7	9	0	.438	2–6	6–6	276	261	W1
San Diego Chargers	4	12	0	.250	2–6	3–9	274	342	L1

== Playoffs ==
Round	Date	Opponent (seed)	Result	Venue	Attendance	Recap
Wildcard	December 28	at Kansas City Chiefs (4)	L 6–10	Arrowhead Stadium	75,824	Recap
