= 1988 Los Angeles Raiders season =

NFL team season

- Owner: Al Davis
- General manager: Al Davis
- Head coach: Mike Shanahan
- Home stadium: Los Angeles Memorial Coliseum

Results
- Record: 7–9
- Division place: 3rd AFC West
- Playoffs: Did not qualify

The 1988 Los Angeles Raiders season was the franchise's 29th season overall, and the franchise's 19th season in the National Football League. Mike Shanahan was hired as head coach, and the club finished with a 7–9 record. The Raiders drafted Heisman Trophy winner Tim Brown, making Brown the third person on the Raiders roster to have won the Heisman Trophy, the others being Marcus Allen and Bo Jackson. Most of the team's success throughout the season came through their division, as the Raiders finished 6–2 against a weakening AFC West division, with their only 2 losses against the champions of the division, the Seattle Seahawks. However, the Raiders were only 1–7 against the rest of the NFL. Their only other win coming against the eventual champions, the 49ers in San Francisco in a game in which only field goals were kicked.

== Offseason ==
=== NFL draft ===
1988 Los Angeles Raiders draft
Round	Pick	Player	Position	College	Notes
1	6	Tim Brown * ^{†}	WR	Notre Dame	
1	9	Terry McDaniel *	CB	Tennessee	
1	25	Scott Davis	DE	Illinois	
4	90	Tim Rother	DT	Nebraska	
5	131	Dennis Price	DB	UCLA	
6	143	Erwin Grabisna	LB	Case Western Reserve	
7	171	Derrick Crudup	DB	Oklahoma	
8	199	Mike Alexander	WR	Penn State	
9	227	Reggie Ware	RB	Auburn	
9	229	Scott Tabor	P	California	
10	255	Newt Harrell	OG	West Texas A&M	
11	283	David Weber	QB	Carroll (WI)	
12	311	Greg Kunkel	OG	Kentucky	
Made roster † Pro Football Hall of Fame * Made at least one Pro Bowl during career

== Personnel ==
=== Staff ===
1988 Los Angeles Raiders staff
Front office: President of the General Partner – Al Davis; Executive Assistant – Al LoCasale; Personnel Operations – Ron Wolf; Senior Executive – John Herrera; Head coaches: Head Coach – Mike Shanahan; Special Assistant to the Head Coach – Alex Gibbs; Offensive coaches: Quarterbacks – Tom Walsh; Offensive Backs – Joe Scannella; Receivers – Nick Nicolau; Offensive Line – Art Shell; Coaches Assistant – Terry Robiskie	Defensive coaches: Defensive Line – Earl Leggett; Linebackers – Sam Gruneisen; Linebackers – Charlie Sumner; Defensive Backs – Willie Brown; Defensive Backs – Jimmy Warren; Special teams coaches: Special Teams – Pete Rodriguez; Strength and conditioning: Strength and Conditioning – John Dunn

=== Roster ===
1988 Los Angeles Raiders roster
Quarterbacks (QB): 7 Steve Beuerlein; 11 Vince Evans; 13 Jay Schroeder; Running backs (RB): 32 Marcus Allen; 34 Bo Jackson; 42 Vance Mueller; 35 Steve Smith; 39 Steve Strachan; Wide receivers (WR): 81 Tim Brown; 86 Mervyn Fernandez; 83 Willie Gault; 80 James Lofton; Tight ends (TE): 46 Todd Christensen; 87 Trey Junkin LS; 85 Andy Parker	Offensive linemen (OL): 61 Mike Freeman G; 60 Rory Graves T; 51 Bill Lewis G; 72 Don Mosebar T; 77 Chris Riehm G; 63 Dwight Wheeler G/T; 68 Bruce Wilkerson G; 66 Steve Wright T; Defensive linemen (DL): 70 Scott Davis DE; 75 Howie Long DE; 71 Bill Pickel NT; 96 Malcolm Taylor NT; 93 Greg Townsend DE; 90 Mike Wise DE	Linebackers (LB): 64 Ron Brown OLB; 52 Linden King OLB; 53 Rod Martin OLB; 56 Milt McColl OLB; 54 Reggie McKenzie LB; 55 Matt Millen ILB; 57 Jerry Robinson ILB; Defensive backs (DB): 44 Stefon Adams CB/S; 33 Eddie Anderson FS; 29 Russell Carter SS; 21 Ron Fellows CB; 22 Mike Haynes CB; 26 Vann McElroy FS; 38 Dennis Price CB; 30 Stacey Toran SS; 48 Lionel Washington CB; Special teams (ST): 10 Chris Bahr K; 6 Jeff Gossett P	Reserve: 89 Mike Alexander WR (IR); 23 Derrick Crudup S (IR); 84 Mike Dyal TE (IR); 63 John Gesek G/C (IR); 73 Charley Hannah G (IR); 62 Newt Harrell G (IR); 82 Charles Henry TE (IR); 59 Jamie Kimmel LB (IR); 40 Zeph Lee S (IR); 36 Terry McDaniel CB (IR); 20 Chris McLemore RB (IR); 79 Tim Rother DT (IR); 91 Eric Snelson LB (IR); 78 Tim Stone T (IR); 47 Reggie Ware RB (IR); 88 Chris Woods WR (IR); 47 active, 16 inactive Rookies in italics

== Regular season ==
=== Schedule ===
Week	Date	Opponent	Result	Record	Venue	Attendance	Recap
1	September 4	**San Diego Chargers**	**W** 24–13	1–0	Los Angeles Memorial Coliseum	39,029	Recap
2	September 11	at Houston Oilers	**L** 35–38	1–1	Houston Astrodome	46,050	Recap
3	September 18	Los Angeles Rams	**L** 17–22	1–2	Los Angeles Memorial Coliseum	84,870	Recap
4	September 26	at **Denver Broncos**	**W** 30–27 (OT)	2–2	Mile High Stadium	75,964	Recap
5	October 2	Cincinnati Bengals	**L** 21–45	2–3	Los Angeles Memorial Coliseum	42,594	Recap
6	October 9	Miami Dolphins	**L** 14–24	2–4	Los Angeles Memorial Coliseum	50,751	Recap
7	October 16	at **Kansas City Chiefs**	**W** 27–17	3–4	Arrowhead Stadium	77,078	Recap
8	October 23	at New Orleans Saints	**L** 6–20	3–5	Louisiana Superdome	66,249	Recap
9	October 30	**Kansas City Chiefs**	**W** 17–10	4–5	Los Angeles Memorial Coliseum	36,103	Recap
10	November 6	at **San Diego Chargers**	**W** 13–3	5–5	Jack Murphy Stadium	55,134	Recap
11	November 13	at San Francisco 49ers	**W** 9–3	6–5	Candlestick Park	54,448	Recap
12	November 20	Atlanta Falcons	**L** 6–12	6–6	Los Angeles Memorial Coliseum	40,967	Recap
13	November 28	at **Seattle Seahawks**	**L** 27–35	6–7	Kingdome	62,641	Recap
14	December 4	**Denver Broncos**	**W** 21–20	7–7	Los Angeles Memorial Coliseum	65,561	Recap
15	December 11	at Buffalo Bills	**L** 21–37	7–8	Rich Stadium	77,348	Recap
16	December 18	**Seattle Seahawks**	**L** 37–43	7–9	Los Angeles Memorial Coliseum	61,127	Recap
Note: Intra-division opponents are in **bold** text.

=== Season summary ===
==== Week 1 ====
Team	1	2	3	4	Total
Chargers	0	3	3	7	13
• **Raiders**	0	14	0	10	24

- Date: September 4
- Location: Los Angeles Memorial Coliseum • Los Angeles
- Game start: 1:00 p.m. PST
- Game weather: 82 °F (27.8 °C), wind 8 miles per hour (13 km/h; 7.0 kn)

Scoring summary
2	LA	Marcus Allen 11 yard run (Chris Bahr kick)	Raiders 7–0
2	SD	Vince Abbott 23 yard field goal	Raiders 7–3
2	LA	Tim Brown 97 yard kickoff return (Chris Bahr kick)	Raiders 14–3
3	SD	Vince Abbott 33 yard field goal	Raiders 14–6
4	LA	Chris Bahr 25 yard field goal	Raiders 17–6
4	SD	Jamie Holland 24 yard pass from Babe Laufenberg (Vince Abbott kick)	Raiders 17–13
4	LA	Marcus Allen 1 yard run (Chris Bahr kick)	Raiders 24–13

==== Week 3 ====
Steve Beuerlein threw for 375 yards in a game against the Los Angeles Rams.

==== Week 4 ====
Team	1	2	3	4	OT	Total
• Raiders	0	0	14	13	3	30
Broncos	7	17	0	3	0	27

- Date: September 26
- Location: Mile High Stadium, Denver, Colorado
- Game start: 6:00 p.m.
- Game weather: 66 °F (18.9 °C), wind 8 miles per hour (13 km/h; 7.0 kn)
- Television network: ABC

Scoring summary
1	DEN	Tony Dorsett 1 yard run (Rich Karlis kick)	Broncos 7–0
2	DEN	Tony Dorsett 1 yard run (Rich Karlis kick)	Broncos 14–0
2	DEN	Steve Sewell 7 yard pass from John Elway (Rich Karlis kick)	Broncos 21–0
2	DEN	Rich Karlis 39 yard field goal	Broncos 24–0
3	LA	Steve Smith 40 yard pass from Jay Schroeder (Chris Bahr kick)	Broncos 24–7
3	LA	Steve Smith 42 yard pass from Jay Schroeder (Chris Bahr kick)	Broncos 24–14
4	LA	Chris Bahr 28 yard field goal	Broncos 24–17
4	LA	Marcus Allen 4 yard run (Chris Bahr kick)	Tie 24–24
4	DEN	Rich Karlis 25 yard field goal	Broncos 27–24
4	LA	Chris Bahr 44 yard field goal	Tie 27–27
OT	LA	Chris Bahr 35 yard field goal	Raiders 30–27

==== Week 7 ====
Team	1	2	3	4	Total
• Raiders	7	7	0	13	27
Chiefs	0	7	0	10	17

- Date: October 16
- Location: Arrowhead Stadium, Kansas City, Missouri
- Game start: 1:00 p.m.
- Game attendance: 77,078
- Game weather: 64 °F (17.8 °C); wind 9 miles per hour (14 km/h; 7.8 kn)

Scoring summary
Q1		LA	Allen 1 yard run (Bahr kick)	LA 7–0
Q2	10:10	LA	Smith 1 yard run (Bahr kick)	LA 14–0
Q2	8:35	KC	Palmer 48 yard pass from DeBerg (Lowery kick)	LA 14–7
Q4		KC	Lowery 43 yard field goal	LA 14–10
Q4		LA	Junkin 4 yard pass from Beuerlein (kick blocked)	LA 20–10
Q4	5:49	LA	Jackson 1 yard run (Bahr kick)	LA 27–10
Q4	1:21	KC	Paige 25 yard pass from DeBerg (Lowery kick)	LA 27–17

- Bo Jackson 70 Yds (season debut; reported to Raiders Wednesday)
- The Raiders played without DE Howie Long, S Stacey Toran and TE Todd Christensen due to injuries while Marcus Allen was limited due to a wrist injury of his own.

=== Standings ===
AFC West
	W	L	T	PCT	DIV	CONF	PF	PA	STK
Seattle Seahawks^{(3)}	9	7	0	.563	6–2	8–4	339	329	W2
Denver Broncos	8	8	0	.500	3–5	5–7	327	352	W1
Los Angeles Raiders	7	9	0	.438	6–2	6–6	325	369	L2
San Diego Chargers	6	10	0	.375	3–5	4–8	231	332	W2
Kansas City Chiefs	4	11	1	.281	2–6	4–9–1	254	320	L2

== Awards and records ==
- Tim Brown, Pro Bowl selection
- Tim Brown, led all AFC rookies in receiving yardage
- Tim Brown, led NFL with 26.8 yard average on kickoff return
- Tim Brown had more total yards rushing, receiving and returning kicks (2,317) than any other rookie in NFL history.
