= 1990 Los Angeles Raiders season =

NFL team season

- Owner: Al Davis
- General manager: Al Davis
- Head coach: Art Shell
- Offensive coordinator: Terry Robiskie
- Defensive coordinator: Dave Adolph
- Home stadium: L.A. Memorial Coliseum

Results
- Record: 12–4
- Division place: 1st AFC West
- Playoffs: Won Divisional Playoffs (vs. Bengals) 20–10; Lost AFC Championship (at Bills) 3–51
- Pro Bowlers: 3: Greg Townsend; Steve Wisniewski; Bo Jackson

The 1990 Los Angeles Raiders season was the franchise's 31st season overall, and the franchise's 21st season in the National Football League. Led by Coach of the Year Art Shell, the club appeared in its first AFC Championship Game since their Super Bowl-winning 1983 season, The Raiders lost a lopsided affair to the Buffalo Bills, 51–3. This would be the Raiders' final division title for 10 years, and their final one in Los Angeles. Bo Jackson suffered a hip injury in the team's divisional playoff victory against the Cincinnati Bengals which turned out to be a career ending injury for him.

NFL Films produced a documentary about the team's season entitled Year of Glory; it was narrated by Jeff Kaye.

== Offseason ==
=== NFL draft ===
1990 Los Angeles Raiders draft
Round	Pick	Player	Position	College	Notes
1	11	Anthony Smith	Defensive end	Arizona	
2	37	Aaron Wallace	Linebacker	Texas A&M	
4	95	Torin Dorn	Defensive back	North Carolina	
6	149	Marcus Wilson	Running back	Virginia	
7	173	Garry Lewis	Defensive back	Alcorn State	
8	197	Arthur Jimerson	Linebacker	Norfolk State	
9	230	Leon Perry	Running back	Oklahoma	
11	303	Ron Lewis	Wide receiver	Jackson State	
11	304	Myron Jones	Running back	Fresno State	
12	317	Major Harris	Quarterback	West Virginia	
12	331	Demetrius Davis	Tight end	Nevada	
Made roster

=== Undrafted free agents ===
1990 undrafted free agents of note
Player	Position	College
Rich Bartlewski	Tight end	Fresno State
John Layfield	Tackle	Abilene Christian
Art Walker	Defensive tackle	Colorado

== Personnel ==
=== Staff / Coaches ===
1990 Los Angeles Raiders staff
Front office: President of the General Partner – Al Davis; Director of Football Operations – Steve Ortmayer; Senior Executive – John Herrera; Head coaches: Head Coach – Art Shell; Offensive coaches: Offense – Tom Walsh; Quarterbacks – Mike White; Offensive Backs – Joe Scannella; Wide Receivers – Fred Biletnikoff; Tight Ends – Terry Robiskie; Offensive Line – Kim Helton	Defensive coaches: Defense/Linebackers – Dave Adolph; Defensive Line – Bill Urbanik; Linebackers – Sam Gruneisen; Defensive Backs – Jack Stanton; Special Projects – Odis McKinney; Special teams coaches: Special Teams – Steve Ortmayer

=== Final roster ===
1990 Los Angeles Raiders roster
Quarterbacks (QB): 7 Steve Beuerlein; 11 Vince Evans; 13 Jay Schroeder; Running backs (RB): 32 Marcus Allen; 34 Bo Jackson; 41 Napoleon McCallum; 42 Vance Mueller; 35 Steve Smith FB; Wide receivers (WR): 81 Tim Brown PR; 86 Mervyn Fernandez; 83 Willie Gault; 85 Sam Graddy; 82 Jamie Holland; Tight ends (TE): 87 Rich Bartlewski; 88 Ethan Horton	Offensive linemen (OL): 73 James FitzPatrick T; 60 Rory Graves T; 65 Max Montoya G; 72 Don Mosebar C; 64 Todd Peat G; 68 Bruce Wilkerson T; 76 Steve Wisniewski G; 66 Steve Wright T; Defensive linemen (DL): 70 Scott Davis DT; 79 Bob Golic DT; 75 Howie Long DE; 71 Bill Pickel DT; 93 Greg Townsend DE; 90 Mike Wise DE	Linebackers (LB): 58 Thomas Benson OLB; 50 Riki Ellison MLB; 55 Alex Gordon OLB; 98 Ricky Hunley MLB; 57 Jerry Robinson OLB; 51 Aaron Wallace OLB; Defensive backs (DB): 33 Eddie Anderson FS; 24 Ron Brown CB; 46 Torin Dorn CB; 45 Mike Harden SS; 25 Dan Land FS; 21 Garry Lewis CB; 36 Terry McDaniel CB; 43 Elvis Patterson SS; 48 Lionel Washington CB; Special teams (ST): 6 Jeff Gossett P; 18 Jeff Jaeger K; 67 Dan Turk LS	Practice squad: 96 Joe Cormier LB; 40 Marcus Wilson RB; Reserve: 80 Mike Alexander WR (IR); 28 Greg Bell RB (IR); 97 Ron Burton LB (IR); 84 Mike Dyal TE (IR); 62 Newt Harrell G (IR); 58 A. J. Jimerson LB (IR); 89 Andy Parker TE (IR); 78 Tim Rother T (IR); 94 Anthony Smith DE (IR); 47 active, 9 inactive, 2 practice squad Rookies in italics

=== Starters ===
POS	Name	GS
QB	Jay Schroeder	16
RB	Marcus Allen	15
FB	Steve Smith	15
WR	Mervyn Fernandez	15
WR	Willie Gault	16
TE	Ethan Horton	14
LT	Rory Graves	15
LG	Steve Wisniewski	16
C	Don Mosebar	16
RG	Max Montoya	16
RT	Steve Wright	16

POS	Name	GS
LDE	Howie Long	11
LDT	Bob Golic	16
RDT	Scott Davis	16
RDE	Greg Townsend	16
LLB	Jerry Robinson	16
MLB	Riki Ellison	15
RLB	Thomas Benson	16
LCB	Terry McDaniel	13
RCB	Lionel Washington	16
SS	Mike Harden	15
FS	Eddie Anderson	16

== Regular season ==
=== Schedule ===
Week	Date	Opponent	Result	Record	Venue	Attendance	Recap
1	September 9	**Denver Broncos**	**W** 14–9	1–0	Los Angeles Memorial Coliseum	54,206	Recap
2	September 16	at **Seattle Seahawks**	**W** 17–13	2–0	Kingdome	61,889	Recap
3	September 23	Pittsburgh Steelers	**W** 20–3	3–0	Los Angeles Memorial Coliseum	50,657	Recap
4	September 30	Chicago Bears	**W** 24–10	4–0	Los Angeles Memorial Coliseum	80,156	Recap
5	October 7	at Buffalo Bills	**L** 24–38	4–1	Rich Stadium	80,076	Recap
6	October 14	**Seattle Seahawks**	**W** 24–17	5–1	Los Angeles Memorial Coliseum	50,624	Recap
7	October 21	at **San Diego Chargers**	**W** 24–9	6–1	Jack Murphy Stadium	60,569	Recap
8	Bye						
9	November 4	at **Kansas City Chiefs**	**L** 7–9	6–2	Arrowhead Stadium	70,951	Recap
10	November 11	Green Bay Packers	**L** 16–29	6–3	Los Angeles Memorial Coliseum	50,855	Recap
11	November 19	at Miami Dolphins	**W** 13–10	7–3	Joe Robbie Stadium	70,553	Recap
12	November 25	**Kansas City Chiefs**	**L** 24–27	7–4	Los Angeles Memorial Coliseum	65,710	Recap
13	December 2	at **Denver Broncos**	**W** 23–20	8–4	Mile High Stadium	74,162	Recap
14	December 10	at Detroit Lions	**W** 38–31	9–4	Pontiac Silverdome	72,190	Recap
15	December 16	Cincinnati Bengals	**W** 24–7	10–4	Los Angeles Memorial Coliseum	54,132	Recap
16	December 22	at Minnesota Vikings	**W** 28–24	11–4	Hubert H. Humphrey Metrodome	53,899	Recap
17	December 30	**San Diego Chargers**	**W** 17–12	12–4	Los Angeles Memorial Coliseum	62,593	Recap
Note: Intra-division opponents are in **bold** text.

=== Game summaries ===
==== Week 1 ====
Team	1	2	3	4	Total
Broncos	3	3	0	3	9
• Raiders	0	0	14	0	14

- Date: September 9
- Location: Los Angeles Memorial Coliseum, Los Angeles
- Game start: 4:00 p.m. EST
- Game attendance: 54,206
- Game weather: 75 °F (23.9 °C), wind 7 miles per hour (11 km/h; 6.1 kn)
- Referee: Jerry Seeman
- Television network: NBC

Scoring summary
Q1	DEN	Treadwell 42 yard field goal	DEN 3–0
Q2	DEN	Treadwell 44 yard field goal	DEN 6–0
Q3	LA	Robinson 5 yard interception return (Jaeger kick)	LA 7–6
Q3	LA	McDaniel 42 yard fumble return (Jaeger kick)	LA 14–6
Q4	DEN	Treadwell 24 yard field goal	LA 14–9

On opening day the Raiders achieved an important victory but they did not score an offensive touchdown. At halftime the Broncos led Los Angeles 6–0. During the third quarter, Denver quarterback John Elway was intercepted by Raider lineback Jerry Robinson and the veteran returned the ball to the endzone for a touchdown. Later, cornerback Terry McDaniel scored the first touchdown of his career on a 42-yard fumble return. Leading 14–6 the Raiders defense held firm and only surrendered a third field goal to Denver.

==== Week 2 ====
Team	1	2	3	4	Total
• Raiders	3	0	0	14	17
Seahawks	0	3	7	3	13

- Date: September 16
- Location: Kingdome, Seattle, WA
- Game start: 4:00 p.m. EST
- Game attendance: 61,889
- Game weather: Indoors (dome)
- Referee: Jerry Markbreit

Scoring summary
Q1	LA	Jaeger 47 yard field goal	LA 3–0
Q2	SEA	Johnson 22 yard field goal	Tie 3–3
Q3	SEA	Williams 2 yard run (Johnson kick)	SEA 10–3
Q4	LA	Fernandez 12 yard pass from Schroeder (Jaeger kick)	Tie 10–10
Q4	SEA	Johnson 19 yard field goal	SEA 13–10
Q4	LA	Bell 1 yard run (Jaeger kick)	LA 17–13

The Raiders won their second straight game to start the 1990 season with a 2–0 record. A defensive struggle ensued between the two teams and by the end of the third quarter the Seahawks led 10–3. Raiders starting quarterback Jay Schroeder tied the game with a 12-yard scoring strike to wide receiver Mervyn Fernandez. Seattle regained the lead a few moments later on a 19-yard field goal. With time running short the Raiders drove downfield and scored on a 1-yard run by reserve running back Greg Bell to earn the victory.

==== Week 3 ====
Team	1	2	3	4	Total
Steelers	3	0	0	0	3
• Raiders	0	3	3	14	20

- Date: September 23
- Location: Los Angeles Memorial Coliseum, Los Angeles
- Game start: 4:00 p.m. EST
- Game attendance: 50,657
- Game weather: 69 °F (20.6 °C); wind 11 miles per hour (18 km/h; 9.6 kn)
- Referee: Howard Roe
- TV announcers (NBC): Marv Albert and Paul Maguire

Scoring summary
Q1	PIT	Anderson 31 yard field goal	PIT 3–0
Q2	LA	Jaeger 40 yard field goal	Tie 3–3
Q3	LA	Jaeger 45 yard field goal	LA 6–3
Q4	LA	Allen 1 yard run (Jaeger kick)	LA 13–3
Q4	LA	Fernandez 66 yard pass from Schroeder (Jaeger kick)	LA 20–3

The Raider defense combined for six sacks to beat Pittsburgh. The Steelers took a 3–0 lead but the Raiders scored 20 straight points to rout Pittsburgh.

==== Week 4 ====
Team	1	2	3	4	Total
Bears	7	3	0	0	10
• Raiders	10	7	0	7	24

- Date: September 30
- Location: Los Angeles Memorial Coliseum, Los Angeles
- Game start: 4:00 p.m. EST
- Game attendance: 80,156
- Game weather: 68 °F (20 °C); wind 11 miles per hour (18 km/h; 9.6 kn)
- Referee: Gene Barth
- TV announcers (CBS): Verne Lundquist and Dan Fouts

Scoring summary
Q1	LA	Allen 1 yard run (Jaeger kick)	LA 7–0
Q1	CHI	Gentry 80 yard pass from Harbaugh (Butler kick)	Tie 7–7
Q1	LA	Jaeger 27 yard field goal	LA 10–7
Q2	LA	Townsend 1 yard fumble return (Jaeger kick)	LA 17–7
Q2	CHI	Butler 22 yard field goal	LA 17–10
Q4	LA	Allen 3 yard run (Jaeger kick)	LA 24–10

Marcus Allen scored the first points of the game, a 1-yard touchdown run, and the Raiders never looked back. Another Allen touchdown and a short fumble return for a touchdown by Greg Townsend rounded out the scoring. Willie Gault beat up his former team with 103 yards receiving on just 4 receptions.

==== Week 5 ====
Team	1	2	3	4	Total
Raiders	7	3	7	7	24
• Bills	0	7	7	24	38

- Date: October 7
- Location: Rich Stadium, Orchard Park, NY
- Game start: 7:30 p.m. EST
- Game attendance: 80,076
- Game weather: 71 °F (21.7 °C); wind 16 miles per hour (26 km/h; 14 kn)
- Referee: Red Cashion
- TV announcers (TNT): Skip Caray and Pat Haden

==== Week 6 ====
Team	1	2	3	4	Total
Seahawks	0	14	3	0	17
• Raiders	7	14	0	3	24

- Date: October 14
- Location: Los Angeles Memorial Coliseum, Los Angeles
- Game start: 4:00 p.m. EST
- Game attendance: 50,624
- Game weather: 66 °F (18.9 °C); wind 7 miles per hour (11 km/h; 6.1 kn)
- Referee: Dick Hantak

Scoring summary
Q1	LA	Smith 1 yard pass from Schroeder (Jaeger kick)	LA 7–0
Q2	LA	Fernandez 3 yard pass from Schroeder (Jaeger kick)	LA 14–0
Q2	LA	Horton 3 yard pass from Schroeder (Jaeger kick)	LA 21–0
Q2	SEA	Skansi 5 yard pass from Krieg (Johnson kick)	LA 21–7
Q2	SEA	Kane 31 yard pass from Krieg (Johnson kick)	LA 21–14
Q3	SEA	Johnson 34 yard field goal	LA 21–17
Q4	LA	Jaeger 22 yard field goal	LA 24–17

Following fan-related violence in the stands during the Raiders' previous two home games, including an incident during the game against Pittsburgh that left a Steelers fan in intensive care and with long term injuries, no alcohol was sold to fans during this game. Alcohol sales would resume at the next home game, but with tighter restrictions.

==== Week 7 ====
Team	1	2	3	4	Total
• Raiders	0	10	7	7	24
Chargers	3	3	3	0	9

- Date: October 21
- Location: Jack Murphy Stadium, San Diego, CA
- Game start: 4:00 p.m. EST
- Game attendance: 60,569
- Game weather: 68 °F (20 °C); wind 10 miles per hour (16 km/h; 8.7 kn)
- Referee: Jerry Seeman

Scoring summary
Q1	SD	Carney 27 yard field goal	SD 3–0
Q2	LA	Jaeger 24 yard field goal	Tie 3–3
Q2	LA	Jackson 5 yard run (Jaeger kick)	LA 10–3
Q2	SD	Carney 37 yard field goal	LA 10–6
Q3	LA	Jackson 7 yard run (Jaeger kick)	LA 17–6
Q3	SD	Carney 37 yard field goal	LA 17–9
Q4	LA	Gault 8 yard pass from Schroeder (Jaeger kick)	LA 24–9

The Raiders rewarded Bo Jackson's return from professional baseball by giving him the ball 12 times for 53 yards and 2 touchdowns. On defense, the Raiders recorded two sacks and held the Chargers to just three field goals.

==== Week 9 ====
Team	1	2	3	4	Total
Raiders	0	0	0	7	7
• Chiefs	6	0	0	3	9

- Date: November 4
- Location: Arrowhead Stadium, Kansas City, MO
- Game start: 1:00 p.m. EST
- Game attendance: 70,951
- Game weather: 36 °F (2.2 °C); wind 22 miles per hour (35 km/h; 19 kn)
- Referee: Jim Tunney

The Raiders scored the only touchdown of the game but the Chiefs outscored and outrushed the Raiders to hand the Raiders their second loss of the season.

==== Week 10 ====
Team	1	2	3	4	Total
• Packers	3	13	3	10	29
Raiders	13	3	0	0	16

- Date: November 11
- Location: Los Angeles Memorial Coliseum, Los Angeles
- Game start: 4:00 p.m. EST
- Game attendance: 50,855
- Game weather: 70 °F (21.1 °C); wind 8 miles per hour (13 km/h; 7.0 kn)
- Referee: Red Cashion

The Packers overcame 8 sacks by the Raiders to force four Raider turnovers and bask in the glory of 10 Raiders penalties.

==== Week 11 ====
Team	1	2	3	4	Total
• Raiders	0	10	3	0	13
Dolphins	0	7	0	3	10

- Date: November 19
- Location: Joe Robbie Stadium, Miami, FL
- Game start: 9:00 p.m. EST
- Game attendance: 70,553
- Game weather: 70 °F (21.1 °C); wind 8 miles per hour (13 km/h; 7.0 kn)
- Referee: Gordon McCarter
- TV announcers (ABC): Al Michaels, Frank Gifford, and Dan Dierdorf

Scoring summary
Q2	LA	Jaeger 23 yard field goal	LA 3–0
Q2	LA	Allen 2 yard run (Jaeger kick)	LA 10–0
Q2	MIA	Schwedes 14 yard pass from Marino (Stoyanovich kick)	LA 10–7
Q3	LA	Jaeger 43 yard field goal	LA 13–7
Q4	MIA	Stoyanovich 26 yard field goal	LA 13–10

On Monday Night Football both Marcus Allen and Bo Jackson rushed for 79 yards and 99 yards respectively to beat Miami and rebound for consecutive losses to Kansas City and Green Bay. Marcus Allen scored the only Raider touchdown of the game.

==== Week 12 ====
Team	1	2	3	4	Total
• Chiefs	0	10	10	7	27
Raiders	0	10	7	7	24

- Date: November 25
- Location: Los Angeles Memorial Coliseum, Los Angeles
- Game start: 4:00 p.m. EST
- Game attendance: 65,710
- Game weather: 60 °F (15.6 °C); wind 7 miles per hour (11 km/h; 6.1 kn)
- Referee: Jerry Markbreit

The Raiders lost their fourth game of the 1990 season and their third defeat in four weeks. Marcus Allen scored three times and both Allen and Jackson combined for over 100 yards rushing but it was not enough. Chiefs quarterback Steve DeBerg threw three touchdown passes and the Chiefs defense combined for five sacks to earn a season sweep of Los Angeles.

==== Week 13 ====
Team	1	2	3	4	Total
• Raiders	7	0	7	9	23
Broncos	3	7	0	10	20

- Date: December 2
- Location: Mile High Stadium, Denver, CO
- Game start: 4:00 p.m. EST
- Game attendance: 74,162
- Game weather: 25 °F (−3.9 °C); wind 11 miles per hour (18 km/h; 9.6 kn)
- Referee: Gene Barth
- TV announcers (NBC): Dick Enberg and Bill Walsh

Scoring summary
Q1	DEN	Treadwell 45 yard field goal	DEN 3–0
Q1	LA	Smith 4 yard run (Jaeger kick)	LA 7–3
Q2	DEN	Johnson 21 yard pass from Elway (Treadwell kick)	DEN 10–7
Q3	LA	Jackson 11 yard run (Jaeger kick)	LA 14–10
Q4	DEN	Treadwell 21 yard field goal	LA 14–13
Q4	LA	Jackson 62 yard run (kick failed)	LA 20–13
Q4	LA	Jaeger 46 yard field goal	LA 23–13
Q4	DEN	Young 8 yard pass from Elway (Treadwell kick)	LA 23–20

Bo Jackson had been fairly quiet all season until a dose of Denver defense cured him of any of his struggles. During the third quarter and with the Raiders leading 14–13, Bo Jackson broke several tackles during a 62-yard touchdown run. The score was Jackson's second touchdown of the afternoon and the former Auburn star rushed 13 times for 117 yards. Receiver Willie Gault helped out with 9 receptions for 99 yards.

==== Week 14 ====
Team	1	2	3	4	Total
• Raiders	14	7	14	3	38
Lions	21	3	0	7	31

- Date: December 10
- Location: Pontiac Silverdome, Pontiac, MI
- Game start: 9:00 p.m. EST
- Game attendance: 72,190
- Game weather: Indoors (dome)
- Referee: Johnny Grier
- TV announcers (ABC): Al Michaels, Frank Gifford, Dan Dierdorf

Scoring summary
Q1	DET	Sanders 35 yard run (Murray kick)	DET 7–0
Q1	LA	Gault 68 yard pass from Schroeder (Jaeger kick)	Tie 7–7
Q1	DET	Sanders 5 yard run (Murray kick)	DET 14–7
Q1	LA	Allen 2 yard run (Jaeger kick)	Tie 14–14
Q1	DET	Campbell 11 yard pass from Peete (Murray kick)	DET 21–14
Q2	DET	Murray 47 yard field goal	DET 24–14
Q2	LA	Jackson 55 yard run (Jaeger kick)	DET 24–21
Q3	LA	Fernandez 10 yard pass from Schroeder (Jaeger kick)	LA 28–24
Q3	LA	Brown 3 yard pass from Schroeder (Jaeger kick)	LA 35–24
Q4	DET	Peete 6 yard run (Murray kick)	LA 35–31
Q4	LA	Jaeger 37 yard field goal	LA 38–31

For the second time in four weeks the Raiders played on Monday Night Football. The game's biggest prime time stage contained some of the greatest college football players in history. The teams set an NFL record with five combined Heisman Trophy winners taking the field. (For the Raiders it was Marcus Allen, Bo Jackson and Tim Brown. For the Lions it was Barry Sanders and Andre Ware.) The game turned out to be a shootout with Allen, Brown, Jackson and Barry Sanders scoring touchdowns. Sanders rushed for 176 yards on 25 carries and Jackson carried 18 times for 129 yards. The Raiders defense captured four sacks and an interception to earn their ninth win of the season.

==== Week 15 ====
Team	1	2	3	4	Total
Bengals	7	0	0	0	7
• Raiders	7	10	7	0	24

- Date: December 16
- Location: Los Angeles Memorial Coliseum, Los Angeles
- Game start: 4:00 p.m. EST
- Game attendance: 54,132
- Game weather: 53 °F (11.7 °C); wind 12 miles per hour (19 km/h; 10 kn)
- Referee: Jim Tunney
- TV announcers (NBC): Charlie Jones and Todd Christensen

Scoring summary
Q1	CIN	McGee 41 yard pass from Esiason (Breech kick)	CIN 7–0
Q1	LA	Brown 5 yard pass from Schroeder (Jaeger kick)	Tie 7–7
Q2	LA	Brown 44 yard pass from Schroeder (Jaeger kick)	LA 14–7
Q2	LA	Jaeger 39 yard field goal	LA 17–7
Q3	LA	Horton 1 yard pass from Schroeder (Jaeger kick)	LA 24–7

During the game Bo Jackson rushed eight times for 117 yards and Tim Brown scored twice. After trailing 7–0 the Raiders scored 24 unanswered points to crush Cincinnati.

==== Week 16 ====
Team	1	2	3	4	Total
• Raiders	14	0	7	7	28
Vikings	0	10	0	14	24

- Date: December 22
- Location: Hubert H. Humphrey Metrodome, Minneapolis, MN
- Game start: 4:00 p.m. EST
- Game attendance: 53,899
- Game weather: Indoors (dome)
- Referee: Dale Hamer
- TV announcers (NBC): Dick Enberg and Bill Walsh

Scoring summary
Q1	LA	Fernandez 74 yard pass from Schroeder (Jaeger kick)	LA 7–0
Q1	LA	Graddy 47 yard pass from Schroeder (Jaeger kick)	LA 14–0
Q2	MIN	Reveiz 28 yard field goal	LA 14–3
Q2	MIN	Carter 27 yard pass from Wilson (Reveiz kick)	LA 14–10
Q3	LA	Allen 19 yard pass from Schroeder (Jaeger kick)	LA 21–10
Q4	LA	Horton 3 yard pass from Schroeder (Jaeger kick)	LA 28–10
Q4	MIN	Jones 4 yard pass from Gannon (Reveiz kick)	LA 28–17
Q4	MIN	Jordan 10 yard pass from Gannon (Reveiz kick)	LA 28–24

Jay Schroeder gave Los Angeles a 14–0 lead after hitting receivers Sam Graddy and Mervyn Fernandez with touchdown passes. The Vikings reentered the game with 10 unanswered points but Schroeder threw two more touchdown passes to Marcus Allen and Ethan Horton to give Los Angeles a 28–10 lead. Future Raider quarterback Rich Gannon replaced Vikings starter and future Raider Wade Wilson and threw two touchdown passes to earn the final points of the contest. The Raiders defense came through again with five sacks and an interception.

==== Week 17 ====
Team	1	2	3	4	Total
Chargers	3	6	0	3	12
• Raiders	0	7	0	10	17

- Date: December 30
- Location: Los Angeles Memorial Coliseum, Los Angeles
- Game start: 4:00 p.m. EST
- Game attendance: 62,593
- Game weather: 53 °F (11.7 °C); wind 5 miles per hour (8.0 km/h; 4.3 kn)
- Referee: Jerry Markbreit

Scoring summary
Q1	SD	Carney 19 yard field goal	SD 3–0
Q2	LA	Allen 1 yard run (Jaeger kick)	LA 7–3
Q2	SD	McEwen 7 yard pass from Friesz (kick failed)	SD 9–7
Q4	LA	Jaeger 45 yard field goal	LA 10–9
Q4	SD	Carney 21 yard field goal	SD 12–10
Q4	LA	Smith 17 yard pass from Schroeder (Jaeger kick)	LA 17–12

The two losses to Kansas City hurt the Raiders here but hopes of a divisional championship were still alive. With a win the Raiders would win the AFC West and the team did not disappoint. Trailing 12–10 in the fourth quarter, the Raiders mounted an important drive and fullback Steve Smith finalized the win with a short touchdown reception from Jay Schroeder.

=== Standings ===
AFC West
	W	L	T	PCT	DIV	CONF	PF	PA	STK
^{(2)} Los Angeles Raiders	12	4	0	.750	6–2	9–3	337	268	W5
^{(5)} Kansas City Chiefs	11	5	0	.688	5–3	7–5	369	257	W2
Seattle Seahawks	9	7	0	.563	4–4	7–5	306	286	W2
San Diego Chargers	6	10	0	.375	2–6	5–9	315	281	L3
Denver Broncos	5	11	0	.313	3–5	4–8	331	374	W1

== Playoffs ==
=== Divisional ===
Team	1	2	3	4	Total
Bengals	0	3	0	7	10
• Raiders	0	7	3	10	20

- Date: January 13
- Location: Los Angeles Memorial Coliseum, Los Angeles
- Game start: 4:00 p.m. EST
- Game attendance: 92,045
- Game weather: Clear; 60 °F (15.6 °C)
- Referee: Tom Dooley
- TV announcers (NBC): Dick Enberg and Bill Walsh

Scoring summary
Q2	CIN	Breech 27 yard field goal	CIN 3–0
Q2	LA	Fernandez 13 yard pass from Schroeder (Jaeger kick)	LA 7–3
Q3	LA	Jaeger 49 yard field goal	LA 10–3
Q4	CIN	Jennings 8 yard pass from Esiason (Breech kick)	Tie 10–10
Q4	LA	Horton 41 yard pass from Schroeder (Jaeger kick)	LA 17–10
Q4	LA	Jaeger 25 yard field goal	LA 20–10

The Raiders recorded 235 rushing yards (with 140 of them coming from running back Marcus Allen), while holding the Bengals to just 182 total yards and sacking Boomer Esiason four times (three by lineman Greg Townsend), but still had to score 10 unanswered points in the fourth quarter to clinch the victory. The Bengals scored first during the second period with kicker Jim Breech's 27-yard field goal. But Los Angeles quarterback Jay Schroeder threw a 13-yard touchdown pass to wide receiver Mervyn Fernandez to give the Raiders a 7–3 lead before halftime. Los Angeles kicker Jeff Jaeger made a 49-field goal in the third quarter, but Cincinnati tied the game early in the fourth period with running back Stanford Jennings' 8-yard touchdown reception from Esiason. However, a 41-yard touchdown pass from Schroeder to tight end Ethan Horton and Jaeger's 25-yard field goal clinched the victory.

This was Raiders running back Bo Jackson's final NFL game, having injured his left hip during the third quarter while being tackled from behind by Bengals linebacker Kevin Walker. The injury was later revealed to have caused a degenerative bone condition in Jackson's hip called avascular necrosis. Before being knocked out of the game, he rushed 6 times for 77 yards. Some Bengals fans theorize that this injury to one of the greatest athletes ever placed a curse on the Bengals franchise (sometimes called "the curse of Bo Jackson"), and that this curse is partially responsible for the Bengals' notorious failure to field a competitive football team for most of the next decade and half, and would not win their next playoff game until the 2021 season, coincidentally against the Raiders.

This game is also notable for being Marcus Allen's last 100-plus yard rushing performance with the Raiders, as well as the last postseason game the Bengals would play in until the 2005 season. Raiders go to the AFC Championship Game but lost to the Bills 51-3.

=== Conference Championship ===
Team	1	2	3	4	Total
Raiders	3	0	0	0	3
• Bills	21	20	0	10	51

- Date: January 20
- Location: Rich Stadium, Orchard Park, NY
- Game start: 12:30 p.m. EST
- Game attendance: 80,325
- Game weather: Rain; 38 °F (3.3 °C)
- Referee: Jim Tunney
- TV announcers (NBC): Dick Enberg and Bill Walsh

Raiders head coach Art Shell became the first African-American coach to take his team to a conference championship game, but the results were not in his favor.

The Bills shredded the Raiders, limiting quarterback Jay Schroeder to 13 of 31 completions for 150 yards and intercepting him 5 times, while also holding running back Marcus Allen to just 26 yards on 10 carries. On offense, the Bills amassed 502 total yards, including 202 yards on the ground. Running back Thurman Thomas rushed for 138 and a touchdown while also catching 5 passes for 61 yards, while running back Kenneth Davis tied an AFC playoff record with 3 rushing touchdowns. Buffalo also set an NFL playoff record by scoring 41 points in the first half. Bills quarterback Jim Kelly threw for 300 yards and two touchdown passes to wide receiver James Lofton, who finished the game with 5 receptions for 113 yards. Thomas recorded a 12-yard touchdown run, while Davis scored from 1 yard, 3 yards, and 1 yard out. Linebacker Darryl Talley returned one of his two interceptions 27 yards for a touchdown.

On Buffalo's opening drive, Kelly completed six consecutive passes, the last one a 13-yard touchdown throw to Lofton after he recovered a fumbled snap in shotgun formation. The Raiders responded with a 41-yard field goal from Jeff Jaeger, but Buffalo stormed back with another touchdown just four plays after the ensuing kickoff, set up by Kelly's 41-yard completion to Lofton. After a punt, Los Angeles defensive back Gary Lewis intercepted a pass from Kelly. But two plays later, Talley intercepted a pass from Schroeder and returned it for a touchdown. The Raiders were forced to punt on their next possession, and Buffalo stormed down the field again, scoring with a 1-yard touchdown run by Davis on fourth down and goal. An interception by Nate Odomes set up Davis' second touchdown less than a minute later, and before the half ended, Lofton caught his second touchdown pass to give the Bills a 41–3 first half lead.

Buffalo increased their lead to 48–3 with Davis' third touchdown on the first play of the fourth quarter. Later on, Scott Norwood closed out the scoring with a 39-yard field goal.

Buffalo recorded a total of six interceptions, the third highest total ever in a single NFL game. Defensive back Mark Kelso recorded his fourth career postseason interception in the game, a Bills' record. Raiders lost and in 1991 finished 9-7 but lost to the Chiefs 10-6.

== Awards and records ==
Art Shell, NFL Coach of the Year Bo Jackson, Pro Bowl Greg Townsend, Pro Bowl Marcus Allen, 13 total touchdowns, 12 rushing and 1 receiving
