= 1989 Los Angeles Raiders season =

NFL team season

- Owner: Al Davis
- General manager: Al Davis
- Head coach: Mike Shanahan (fired October 3, 1-3 record); Art Shell (interim; 7-5 record)
- Home stadium: L.A. Memorial Coliseum

Results
- Record: 8–8
- Division place: 3rd AFC West
- Playoffs: Did not qualify

The 1989 Los Angeles Raiders season was the franchise's 30th season overall, and the franchise's 20th season in the National Football League. Art Shell replaced Mike Shanahan, and in the process became the first black head coach in the NFL since Fritz Pollard coached the Akron Pros in 1921. The team finished with an 8–8 record. In preseason against the Houston Oilers, the Raiders played their first game in Oakland since moving to Los Angeles in 1982, before eventually moving back to Oakland in 1995.

== Offseason ==
=== NFL draft ===
1989 Los Angeles Raiders draft
Round	Pick	Player	Position	College	Notes
6	140	Jeff Francis	QB	Tennessee	
6	156	Doug Lloyd	RB	North Dakota State	
8	205	Derrick Gainer	RB	Florida A&M	
9	235	Gary Gooden	DB	Indiana	
10	262	Charles Jackson	DT	Jackson State	
Made roster

=== Transactions ===
- NFL Plan B Free Agent signings
  - Bob Golic

== Staff ==
1989 Los Angeles Raiders staff
Front office: President of the General Partner – Al Davis; Executive Assistant – Al LoCasale; Personnel Operations – Ron Wolf; Senior Executive – John Herrera; Head coaches: Head coach – Mike Shanahan; Assistant head coach – Alex Gibbs; Offensive coaches: Quarterbacks – Tom Walsh; Offensive backs – Joe Scannella; Wide receivers – Fred Biletnikoff; Tight ends – Terry Robiskie; Offensive line – Art Shell	Defensive coaches: Defense/linebackers – Dave Adolph; Defensive line – Bill Urbanik; Linebackers – Sam Gruneisen; Defensive backs – Jack Stanton; Special teams coaches: Special teams – Pete Rodriguez; Strength and conditioning: Strength and conditioning – John Dunn

== Roster ==
1989 Los Angeles Raiders roster
Quarterbacks (QB): 7 Steve Beuerlein; 13 Jay Schroeder; Running backs (RB): 32 Marcus Allen; 34 Bo Jackson; 42 Vance Mueller; 31 Kerry Porter; 35 Steve Smith FB; 39 Steve Strachan; Wide receivers (WR): 89 Mike Alexander; 86 Mervyn Fernandez; 83 Willie Gault; 80 Timmie Ware; Tight ends (TE): 84 Mike Dyal; 88 Ethan Horton; 87 Trey Junkin LS	Offensive linemen (OL): 63 John Gesek G; 60 Rory Graves T; 72 Don Mosebar C; 78 Tim Rother T; 67 Dan Turk C; 68 Bruce Wilkerson T; 76 Steve Wisniewski G; 66 Steve Wright G/T; Defensive linemen (DL): 70 Scott Davis DT; 79 Bob Golic DT; 75 Howie Long DE; 97 Mark Mraz DE; 71 Bill Pickel DT; 93 Greg Townsend DE; 90 Mike Wise DE	Linebackers (LB): 58 Thomas Benson OLB; 98 Ricky Hunley MLB; 92 Emanuel King OLB; 52 Linden King OLB; 57 Jerry Robinson MLB; Defensive backs (DB): 44 Stefon Adams CB/S; 33 Eddie Anderson FS; 45 Mike Harden SS; 22 Mike Haynes CB; 25 Dan Land CB; 40 Zeph Lee SS; 36 Terry McDaniel CB; 26 Vann McElroy FS; 20 Dennis Price CB; 48 Lionel Washington CB; Special teams (ST): 6 Jeff Gossett P; 18 Jeff Jaeger K	Practice squad: 56 Joe Cormier LB; 23 Derrick Crudup S; 19 Jeff Francis QB; 37 Doug Lloyd RB; Reserve: 28 Rex Brown CB (IR); 81 Tim Brown WR (IR); 29 Russell Carter S (IR); 41 Bobby Joe Edmonds RB (IR); 85 Sam Graddy WR (IR); 62 Newt Harrell G (IR); 65 Dale Hellestrae T (IR); 47 active, 7 inactive, 4 practice squad, 1 exempt Rookies in italics

== Regular season ==
The Raiders started the season with one win and three losses. After hiring Art Shell in week 5, the Raiders won seven of their next ten games. The Raiders suffered road losses to the Seahawks and to the Giants, to be eliminated from playoff contention.

In the Raiders' 28-7 win in week 9 over the Cincinnati Bengals, Bo Jackson scored a touchdown on a 92-yard run. In just his third NFL season, Jackson became the first player ever to record two runs of 90-plus yards in a career.

Steve Wisniewski was the youngest player on the Raiders roster. At the age of 22, he was in the starting lineup at the Guard position.

Steve Beuerlein started seven games at quarterback and his best performance was against the New York Giants in week 16. Beuerlein completed 16 passes for 266 yards.

=== Schedule ===
Week	Date	Opponent	Result	Record	Venue	Attendance	Recap
1	September 10	**San Diego Chargers**	**W** 40–14	1–0	Los Angeles Memorial Coliseum	40,237	Recap
2	September 17	at **Kansas City Chiefs**	**L** 19–24	1–1	Arrowhead Stadium	71,741	Recap
3	September 24	at **Denver Broncos**	**L** 21–31	1–2	Mile High Stadium	75,754	Recap
4	October 1	**Seattle Seahawks**	**L** 20–24	1–3	Los Angeles Memorial Coliseum	44,319	Recap
5	October 9	at New York Jets	**W** 14–7	2–3	Giants Stadium	68,040	Recap
6	October 15	**Kansas City Chiefs**	**W** 20–14	3–3	Los Angeles Memorial Coliseum	40,453	Recap
7	October 22	at Philadelphia Eagles	**L** 7–10	3–4	Veterans Stadium	64,019	Recap
8	October 29	Washington Redskins	**W** 37–24	4–4	Los Angeles Memorial Coliseum	52,781	Recap
9	November 5	Cincinnati Bengals	**W** 28–7	5–4	Los Angeles Memorial Coliseum	51,080	Recap
10	November 12	at **San Diego Chargers**	**L** 12–14	5–5	Jack Murphy Stadium	59,151	Recap
11	November 19	at Houston Oilers	**L** 7–23	5–6	Astrodome	59,198	Recap
12	November 26	New England Patriots	**W** 24–21	6–6	Los Angeles Memorial Coliseum	38,747	Recap
13	December 3	**Denver Broncos**	**W** 16–13 (OT)	7–6	Los Angeles Memorial Coliseum	87,560	Recap
14	December 10	Phoenix Cardinals	**W** 16–14	8–6	Los Angeles Memorial Coliseum	41,785	Recap
15	December 17	at **Seattle Seahawks**	**L** 17–23	8–7	Kingdome	61,076	Recap
16	December 24	at New York Giants	**L** 17–34	8–8	Giants Stadium	70,306	Recap
Note: Intra-division opponents are in **bold** text.

=== Game summaries ===
==== Week 5 ====
Team	1	2	3	4	Total
• Raiders	0	0	7	7	14
Jets	0	0	7	0	7

- Date: October 9
- Location: Giants Stadium, East Rutherford, New Jersey
- Game start: 9:00 p.m. EST
- Game attendance: 68,040
- Game weather: 49 °F (9 °C); wind 15 mph (24 km/h)
- Referee: Johnny Grier
- TV announcers (ABC): Al Michaels, Frank Gifford, and Dan Dierdorf

Scoring summary
Q3	LA	Mervyn Fernandez 73 yard pass from Jay Schroeder (Jeff Jaeger kick)	LA 7–0
Q3	NYJ	Roger Vick 1 yard run (Pat Leahy kick)	Tie 7–7
Q4	LA	Eddie Anderson 87 yard interception return (Jeff Jaeger kick)	LA 14–7

==== Week 6 ====
Team	1	2	3	4	Total
Chiefs	7	0	0	7	14
• Raiders	3	7	3	7	20

- Date: October 15
- Location: Los Angeles Memorial Coliseum, Los Angeles
- Game start: 4:00 p.m.
- Game weather: 64 °F (18 °C); wind 9 mph (14 km/h)
- Referee: Howard Roe

Scoring summary
Q1	KC	Okoye 2 yard run (Lowery kick)	KC 7–0
Q1	LA	Jaeger 24 yard field goal	KC 7–3
Q2	LA	Jackson 2 yard run (Jaeger kick)	LA 10–7
Q3	LA	Jaeger 50 yard field goal	LA 13–7
Q4	LA	Mueller 6 yard run (Jaeger kick)	LA 20–7
Q4	KC	Thomas 11 yard pass from DeBerg (Lowery kick)	LA 20–14

=== Standings ===
AFC West
	W	L	T	PCT	DIV	CONF	PF	PA	STK
Denver Broncos^{(1)}	11	5	0	.688	6–2	9–3	362	226	L1
Kansas City Chiefs	8	7	1	.531	3–5	6–7–1	307	286	W1
Los Angeles Raiders	8	8	0	.500	3–5	6–6	315	297	L2
Seattle Seahawks	7	9	0	.438	4–4	7–5	241	327	L1
San Diego Chargers	6	10	0	.375	4–4	4–8	266	290	W2

== Awards and records ==
- Mike Dyal, AFC Offensive Player of week 13 (caught 4 passes for 134 yards and 1 TD vs. Denver, caught 67-yard pass to send game into Overtime, caught 2 passes for 41 yards to set up game-winning field goal.)
- Howie Long, AFC Pro Bowl selection
