= 1992 Los Angeles Raiders season =

NFL team season

- Owner: Al Davis
- General manager: Al Davis
- Head coach: Art Shell
- Home stadium: L.A. Memorial Coliseum

Results
- Record: 7–9
- Division place: 4th AFC West
- Playoffs: Did not qualify

The 1992 Los Angeles Raiders season was their 33rd in the National Football League (NFL). They were unable to improve upon their previous season's output of 9–7, winning only seven games. This was the first time in three seasons the team failed to qualify for the playoffs.

This was Bill King's 27th and last season as radio voice of the Raiders. King retired from football play-by-play to focus on his duties with the Oakland Athletics of Major League Baseball. King remained active with the Athletics until his death on November 1, 2005.

== Offseason ==
=== NFL draft ===
1992 Los Angeles Raiders draft
Round	Pick	Player	Position	College	Notes
1	16	Chester McGlockton	Defensive tackle	Clemson	
2	32	Greg Skrepenak	Tackle	Michigan	
Made roster * Made at least one Pro Bowl during career

== Personnel ==
=== Staff / Coaches ===
1992 Los Angeles Raiders staff
Front office: President of the general partner – Al Davis; Director of football operations – Steve Ortmayer; Senior executive – John Herrera; Head coaches: Head coach – Art Shell; Offensive coaches: Offense/tight ends – Terry Robiskie; Offense – Tom Walsh; Quarterbacks – Mike White; Offensive backs – Joe Scannella; Wide receivers – Fred Biletnikoff; Offensive line – Kim Helton	Defensive coaches: Defense/linebackers – Gunther Cunningham; Defensive line – Earl Leggett; Linebackers – Ronnie Jones; Defensive backs – Odis McKinney; Defensive backs – Jack Stanton; Special teams coaches: Special teams – Steve Ortmayer; Strength and conditioning: Strength and conditioning – Todd Sperber; Strength and conditioning – Doug Wilkerson

=== Final roster ===
1992 Los Angeles Raiders roster
Quarterbacks (QB): 11 Vince Evans; 12 Todd Marinovich; 10 Jay Schroeder; Running backs (RB): 32 Marcus Allen; 38 Nick Bell; 29 Eric Dickerson; 41 Napoleon McCallum; 35 Steve Smith FB; Wide receivers (WR): 81 Tim Brown PR; 86 Mervyn Fernandez; 83 Willie Gault; 85 Sam Graddy; 89 Alexander Wright KR; Tight ends (TE): 87 Andrew Glover; 88 Ethan Horton; 82 David Jones; 39 Kevin Smith	Offensive linemen (OL): 77 Reggie McElroy T; 65 Max Montoya G; 72 Don Mosebar C; 64 Todd Peat G/T; 55 Rich Stephens G; 76 Steve Wisniewski G; 66 Steve Wright T; Defensive linemen (DL): 97 Willie Broughton DT; 56 Aundray Bruce DE; 79 Bob Golic DT; 74 Nolan Harrison DT; 75 Howie Long DE/DT; 91 Chester McGlockton DT; 94 Anthony Smith DE/DT; 93 Greg Townsend DE	Linebackers (LB): 59 Anthony Bell MLB; 52 Mike Jones MLB; 99 Winston Moss OLB; 51 Aaron Wallace OLB; Defensive backs (DB): 33 Eddie Anderson FS; 46 Torin Dorn CB; 20 Derrick Hoskins SS; 25 Dan Land CB/S; 42 Ronnie Lott SS; 36 Terry McDaniel CB; 48 Lionel Washington CB; 44 Dave Waymer FS; Special teams (ST): 7 Jeff Gossett P; 18 Jeff Jaeger K; 67 Dan Turk LS	Practice squad: 92 Ferric Collons DE; 14 Daryl Hobbs WR; 17 Tyrone Montgomery RB; Reserve: 50 Riki Ellison LB (IR); 49 Kyle Freeman LB (IR); 43 Elvis Patterson CB/S (IR); 78 Greg Skrepenak T (IR); 68 Bruce Wilkerson T (IR); 47 active, 5 inactive, 3 practice squad Rookies in italics

== Schedule ==
Week	Date	Opponent	Result	Record	Venue	Attendance	Recap
1	September 6	at **Denver Broncos**	**L** 13–17	0–1	Mile High Stadium	75,418	Recap
2	September 13	at Cincinnati Bengals	**L** 21–24 (OT)	0–2	Riverfront Stadium	54,240	Recap
3	September 20	Cleveland Browns	**L** 16–28	0–3	Los Angeles Memorial Coliseum	48,102	Recap
4	September 28	at **Kansas City Chiefs**	**L** 7–27	0–4	Arrowhead Stadium	77,486	Recap
5	October 4	New York Giants	**W** 13–10	1–4	Los Angeles Memorial Coliseum	43,103	Recap
6	October 11	Buffalo Bills	**W** 20–3	2–4	Los Angeles Memorial Coliseum	52,287	Recap
7	October 18	at **Seattle Seahawks**	**W** 19–0	3–4	Kingdome	56,904	Recap
8	October 25	Dallas Cowboys	**L** 13–28	3–5	Los Angeles Memorial Coliseum	91,505	Recap
9	Bye						
10	November 8	at Philadelphia Eagles	**L** 10–31	3–6	Veterans Stadium	65,388	Recap
11	November 15	**Seattle Seahawks**	**W** 20–3	4–6	Los Angeles Memorial Coliseum	46,862	Recap
12	November 22	**Denver Broncos**	**W** 24–0	5–6	Los Angeles Memorial Coliseum	50,011	Recap
13	November 29	at **San Diego Chargers**	**L** 3–27	5–7	Jack Murphy Stadium	59,894	Recap
14	December 6	**Kansas City Chiefs**	**W** 28–7	6–7	Los Angeles Memorial Coliseum	45,227	Recap
15	December 14	at Miami Dolphins	**L** 7–20	6–8	Joe Robbie Stadium	67,098	Recap
16	December 20	**San Diego Chargers**	**L** 14–36	6–9	Los Angeles Memorial Coliseum	40,152	Recap
17	December 26	at Washington Redskins	**W** 21–20	7–9	RFK Stadium	53,032	Recap
Note: Intra-division opponents are in **bold** text.

== Game summaries ==
=== Week 5 ===
New York Giants at Los Angeles Raiders

Team	1	2	3	4	Total
Giants	0	10	0	0	10
• Raiders	0	0	10	3	13

- Date: October 4
- Location: Los Angeles Memorial Coliseum, Los Angeles
- Game start: 1:00 p.m. PST
- Game weather: 66 °F (19 °C), wind 8 mph (13 km/h)
- Source: Pro-Football-Reference.com

Scoring summary
2	Giants	Jarrod Bunch 5-yard run (Matt Bahr kick)	Giants 7–0
2	Giants	Matt Bahr 18-yard field goal	Giants 10–0
3	Raiders	Jeff Jaeger 26-yard field goal	Giants 10–3
3	Raiders	Tim Brown 68-yard pass from Todd Marinovich (Jeff Jaeger kick)	Tie 10–10
4	Raiders	Jeff Jaeger 54-yard field goal	Raiders 13–10

=== Week 6 ===
Team	1	2	3	4	Total
Bills	0	3	0	0	3
• Raiders	7	10	3	0	20

- Date: October 11
- Location: Los Angeles Memorial Coliseum, Los Angeles
- Game start: 4:00 p.m. EST
- Game weather: 64 °F (18 °C); wind 10 mph (16 km/h)

Scoring summary
Q1	LA	Dickerson 2 yard pass from Marinovich (Jaeger kick)	LA 7–0
Q2	BUF	Christie 25 yard field goal	LA 7–3
Q2	LA	Brown 52 yard pass from Marinovich (Jaeger kick)	LA 14–3
Q2	LA	Jaeger 45 yard field goal	LA 17–3
Q3	LA	Jaeger 36 yard field goal	LA 20–3

=== Week 17 ===
Los Angeles Raiders at Washington Redskins

Team	1	2	3	4	Total
• Raiders	0	0	7	14	21
Redskins	0	3	7	10	20

- Date: December 26
- Location: RFK Stadium, Washington, D.C.
- Game start: 4:00 p.m. EST
- Game weather: 38 °F (3 °C), wind 16 mph (26 km/h)
- Source: Pro-Football-Reference.com

Scoring summary
2	Redskins	Chip Lohmiller 39-yard field goal	Redskins 3–0
3	Raiders	Alexander Wright 41-yard pass from Vince Evans (Jeff Jaeger kick)	Raiders 7–3
3	Redskins	Art Monk 49-yard pass from Mark Rypien (Chip Lohmiller kick)	Redskins 10–7
4	Redskins	Chip Lohmiller 22-yard field goal	Redskins 13–7
4	Raiders	Nick Bell 5-yard run (Jeff Jaeger kick)	Raiders 14–13
4	Redskins	Ricky Ervins 1-yard run (Chip Lohmiller kick)	Redskins 20–14
4	Raiders	Tim Brown 3-yard pass from Vince Evans (Jeff Jaeger kick)	Raiders 21–20

== Standings ==
AFC West
	W	L	T	PCT	DIV	CONF	PF	PA	STK
^{(3)} San Diego Chargers	11	5	0	.688	5–3	9–5	335	241	W7
^{(6)} Kansas City Chiefs	10	6	0	.625	6–2	8–4	348	282	W1
Denver Broncos	8	8	0	.500	4–4	7–5	262	329	L1
Los Angeles Raiders	7	9	0	.438	4–4	5–7	249	281	W1
Seattle Seahawks	2	14	0	.125	1–7	2–10	140	312	L4
