= Vince Evans =

American football player (born 1955)

No. 18, 11, 29
- Position: Quarterback

Personal information
- Born: June 14, 1955 (age 71); Greensboro, North Carolina, U.S.
- Listed height: 6 ft 2 in (1.88 m)
- Listed weight: 215 lb (98 kg)

Career information
- High school: Ben L. Smith (Greensboro)
- College: Los Angeles CC (1973); USC (1974–1976)
- NFL draft: 1977: 6th round, 140th overall pick

Career history
- Chicago Bears (1977–1983); Chicago Blitz (1984); Denver Gold (1985); Los Angeles / Oakland Raiders (1987–1995)

Awards and highlights
- National champion (1974)

Career NFL statistics
- Passing attempts: 1,390
- Passing completions: 704
- Completion percentage: 50.6%
- TD–INT: 52–74
- Passing yards: 9,485
- Passer rating: 63
- Stats at Pro Football Reference

Vincent Tobias Evans (born June 14, 1955) is an American former professional football player who was a quarterback in the National Football League (NFL). He played college football for the USC Trojans and was the most valuable player (MVP) of the 1977 Rose Bowl after the team's 14–6 victory over Michigan. He was selected by the Chicago Bears in the sixth round of the 1977 NFL draft.

Evans played professionally for the Bears as well as Chicago's team in the United States Football League (USFL), the Chicago Blitz, as well as the USFL's Denver Gold, and the NFL's Los Angeles/Oakland Raiders in a career that spanned nearly 20 years from 1977 to 1995.

== College career ==
Vince Evans played high school football for Ben L. Smith High School in Greensboro, North Carolina. He is one of six players from that program that went on to play professional football. The list includes former Washington Redskins center Jeff Bostic and his brother Joe. Former Pittsburgh Steelers tight end Eric Ebron also attended Ben L. Smith.

Inspired to want to play at the University of Southern California as a youth that was amazed by seeing the school play against UCLA in 1967, Evans turned down a scholarship to North Carolina Central University to move to Los Angeles and play at Los Angeles City College. A showing of his talents at a showcase impressed USC enough to want him on their team. As a sophomore, Evans was a backup quarterback at USC, which was impressed by Evans’ arm after seeing him play in a junior college showcase.

Evans enrolled at USC and saw his first action during the 1974 season, then coached by John McKay. Evans served as an understudy to Pat Haden. In his first season of action, Evans completed six of sixteen passes for one touchdown and one interception. USC finished 10–1 while being ranked #1 in the Coaches Poll.

The following season, with Haden graduated and off to the NFL, Evans took over as starter. Despite having the talented Ricky Bell and Mosi Tatupu in the backfield, the Trojans slipped to 8–4 and ranked 17 in the final AP poll that season. Owing to a ground attack set by McKay, Evans only attempted 112 passes that season. In Evans' senior season, John Robinson replaced a departing McKay. Under Robinson, Evans had his best career season. He completed 95 passes on 177 attempts while throwing for ten touchdowns to five interceptions. USC's fortunes in the AP poll improved as well, as the team finished 11–1, with their only loss being the season opener to Missouri. After that, USC rolled off eleven straight wins, including a 56–0 blowout of the Iowa Hawkeyes. From there, USC defeated their Pac-8 opponents and closed out the regular season with a win over rival Notre Dame 17–13. Evans led USC to a 14–6 win over Michigan in the 1977 Rose Bowl, which saw Evans score a rushing touchdown to give USC a 7–6 lead before halftime as the Trojans held on to win 14–6 that saw Evans named Player of the Game.

In 2022, Evans was inducted into the Rose Bowl Hall of Fame.

== Professional career ==
=== Chicago Bears ===
In 1977, the Bears selected Evans in the sixth round of the draft with the 140th overall pick. He was the fourth player drafted by the Bears, behind tackle Ted Albrecht, defensive back Mike Spivey, and tight end Robin Earl. Evans made the team as a back-up behind Bob Avellini. Evans did not attempt a pass his rookie season. Instead, he was initially used as a kick returner, returning 13 kicks for 253 yards. The Bears, under head coach Jack Pardee went 9–5 and made the playoffs. However, they were crushed by the Dallas Cowboys 37–7.

Evans finally attempted his first NFL pass in 1978, coming off the bench late in a 40–7 blowout loss to the San Diego Chargers. Both Avellini and Mike Phipps were ineffective against the Chargers. Evans did not see much action in 1978 either, but he did throw passes that season (three, with one being an interception). In 1979 under new head coach Neill Armstrong, the Bears went 10–6. Avellini lost his starting job to Phipps and Evans was soon promoted ahead of Avellini. In week two against the Vikings, Evans came into the game in a game where both Phipps and Avellini were used. Evans went 4-of-7 for 88 yards and threw his first ever touchdown pass to James Scott. Evans was tapped to start the next three games of the season, making him the first African American to start a game for the Bears at quarterback. The Bears lost all three of his starts and Evans didn't play the rest of the year. In total, he went 32-of-63 with 508 yards for four touchdowns and five interceptions.

Evans was thrust into the starting position for Week 4. He finally earned his first win as a starter that week against the Detroit Lions, going 5-of-8 for 172 yards with a touchdown and an interception while also rushing for a score in the 24-7 victory. Evans started the next nine games, where the Bears went 5-5. He went 18-of-22 for 316 yards and three touchdowns in a 61-7 win over the Green Bay Packers on December 7, which garnered him a perfect 158.3 passer rating, the first and so far only Bear quarterback to do so. He threw for 2,039 yards with 11 touchdowns to 16 interceptions and a passer rating of 66.2 while also contributing eight rushing touchdowns. The team went 7–9.

In 1981, Evans was tapped to start on Week 1 and started all sixteen games. He threw for 2,354 yards with 11 touchdowns to 20 interceptions with a 51.1 passer rating as the Bears went 6-10. The Bears continued to slump, despite having all-pro Walter Payton in the backfield. At the end of the 1981 season, coach Armstrong was fired and the Bears hired Mike Ditka. The Bears under Ditka restructured the quarterback rotation for 1982. Mike Phipps was released, and Evans was a back-up again, this time to Jim McMahon, who the Bears selected in the first round of the 1982 draft; Evans threw just 28 passes that year. Evans was asked to start three games of the 1983 season and made spot appearances in six other games, throwing a total of 1,108 yards with five touchdowns to seven interceptions. Not wanting to be a bench player with McMahon around, he bolted for the USFL in 1984 in a decision he later regretted, calling it an "ego" problem on his part (McMahon ended up getting hurt in the 1984 season).

=== Move to the USFL ===
Evans balked at the idea of sharing the starting role with Bears quarterback McMahon and turned down an offer to remain with the Bears. Instead, he jumped to the USFL. He signed a contract that was reported in the area of five million over four years to sign with the Chicago Blitz, making Evans one of the highest paid quarterbacks in the league at the time. Evans was signed by the new team owners as the previous ownership group sold their interest to buy the new franchise in Arizona. In doing so, they took the Blitz head coach, George Allen and the starting quarterback Greg Landry with them. New ownership named Marv Levy as the head coach and signed Evans as their starting quarterback.

Evans played only one season for the Blitz. In that season, he completed 200 passes on 411 attempts in the wide-open offense that featured running back Tim Spencer and former Notre Dame star Kris Haines at receiver. Evans threw more interceptions (22) than he did touchdowns (14). The Blitz finished 5–13 and in fifth place. The next season, with the Blitz folded, Evans joined the Denver Gold. Again, he threw more interceptions than he did touchdowns. He split time with Bob Gagliano but the Gold finished with an 11–7 record. After that 1985 season, the USFL made their ill-fated decision to abandon spring football and try and play in the fall. Because of this, Evans did not play football in 1986. During this time, Evans sued the former ownership of the Blitz. Evans claimed he was owed money from arbitration that was never paid.

=== Raiders ===
In 1987, the Los Angeles Raiders were in need of a quarterback. Jim Plunkett was battling with a shoulder issue, and former first-round pick Marc Wilson had failed to live up to lofty expectations. The team also had Rusty Hilger who they hoped to develop into a starter. With an NFLPA strike looming, Evans signed with the Raiders, as did Mark van Allen, a Division III quarterback that had been in camp with the Raiders. Wilson ended up crossing the picket line, but the strike turned out to be Evans' way back in the league, where he stayed. His start in 1987 made him the first black quarterback to start for the Raiders.

Over the course of the next several seasons, despite an ever-changing cast at quarterback, Evans remained the back-up, serving as much as a coach as he did a back-up. Evans appeared in relief of Jay Schroeder in the AFC Championship Game loss in 1991. At age 35, Evans was the oldest quarterback to make their postseason debut, a mark he held until 2020. In 1991, he served as a third-string quarterback behind Jay Schroeder and Todd Marinovich. In 1992, Evans saw spot duty as the Raiders fell to 7–9 under coach Art Shell.

In 1993, Schroeder left the Raiders for the Cincinnati Bengals and Marinovich was cut. The Raiders turned to Jeff Hostetler, the previous hero of the New York Giants for Super Bowl XXV two years prior. In 1993, at the age of 38, Evans returned for another season with the Raiders. In 1994, at the age of 39, Evans re-signed with the Raiders to serve as their back up. Briefly substituting for Hostetler, Evans completed all two of his passes, including a touchdown pass to Raghib Ismail in the Raiders 24–17 win over the Chargers. Evans threw the last touchdown pass in L.A. Raiders history during their last game on 12/24/1994 vs Kansas City.

In 1995, the Raiders returned to the city of Oakland, and Evans made the move. Art Shell was fired and Mike White was named head coach. Hostetler was still the starter, but the Raiders drafted Billy Joe Hobert out of the University of Washington to be the quarterback of the future. 1995 would be Evans' final year as an active player. Despite being 40 years old, Evans made three starts for the Raiders, going 1–2 during that span. In his first start that season, he led the Raiders to a 30–17 win over the Indianapolis Colts, a team quarterbacked by Jim Harbaugh. His next start came on the road against the San Diego Chargers. In a game that featured no touchdowns by either team, Evans threw three interceptions, all to Chargers defensive back Dwayne Harper as the Raiders lost 12–6. Evans was the starter the next week against the Kansas City Chiefs. He went 23 of 37 with two interceptions before he was relieved by Hobert. It would be the last start of Evans' career, and the Raiders lost 29–23 to fall to 8–5. Evans made a brief appearance the following week in the Raiders 31–28 loss to the Denver Broncos.

== Post NFL career ==
After leaving football, Evans built a successful real estate career in Southern California.

== NFL career statistics ==
Year	Team	Games			Passing							Rushing			
Year	Team	GP	GS	Record	Cmp	Att	Pct	Yds	TD	Int	Rtg	Att	Yds	TD	Avg
1977	CHI	0	0	—	0	0	—	0	0	0	0	0	0	0	0
1978	CHI	3	0	—	1	3	33.3	38	0	1	42.4	6	23	0	3.8
1979	CHI	4	3	0–3	32	63	50.8	508	4	5	66.1	12	72	1	6.0
1980	CHI	13	10	5–5	148	278	53.2	2,039	11	16	66.2	60	306	8	5.1
1981	CHI	16	16	6–10	195	436	44.7	2,354	11	20	51.1	43	218	3	5.1
1982	CHI	4	0	—	12	28	42.9	125	0	4	16.8	2	0	0	0
1983	CHI	9	3	1–2	76	145	52.4	1,108	5	7	69.0	22	142	1	6.5
1987	LAR	3	3	1–2	39	83	47.0	630	5	4	72.9	11	144	1	13.1
1989	LAR	1	0	—	2	2	100.0	50	0	0	118.7	1	16	0	16.0
1990	LAR	5	0	—	1	1	100.0	36	0	0	118.7	1	-2	0	-2.0
1991	LAR	4	0	—	6	14	42.9	127	1	2	59.8	8	20	0	2.5
1992	LAR	5	0	—	29	53	54.7	372	4	3	78.5	11	79	0	7.2
1993	LAR	8	1	0–1	45	76	59.2	640	3	4	77.7	14	51	0	3.6
1994	LAR	9	0	—	18	33	54.5	222	2	0	95.8	6	24	0	4.0
1995	OAK	9	3	1–2	100	175	57.1	1,236	6	8	71.5	14	36	0	2.6
Career		100	39	14–25	704	1,390	50.6	9,485	52	74	63.0	212	1,129	14	5.3
