= 1990 All-Pro Team =

Official list of the best NFL players in 1990

The 1990 All-Pro Team is composed of the National Football League players that were named to the Associated Press, Newspaper Enterprise Association, Pro Football Writers Association, Pro Football Weekly, and The Sporting News All-Pro Teams in 1990. Both first and second teams are listed for the AP and NEA teams. These are the five teams that are included in Total Football II: The Official Encyclopedia of the National Football League.

== Teams ==
Offense
Position	First team	Second team
Quarterback	Joe Montana, San Francisco 49ers (AP, NEA); Randall Cunningham, Philadelphia Eagles (PFWA, PFW); Warren Moon, Houston Oilers (TSN)	Warren Moon, Houston Oilers (AP-2); Jim Kelly, Buffalo Bills (NEA-2)
Running back	Barry Sanders, Detroit Lions (AP, NEA, PFWA, PFW, TSN); Thurman Thomas, Buffalo Bills (AP, NEA, PFWA, PFW, TSN)	Neal Anderson, Chicago Bears (AP-2, NEA-2); Marion Butts, San Diego Chargers (AP-2, NEA-2)
Wide receiver	Andre Rison, Atlanta Falcons (AP, NEA, PFWA, PFW, TSN); Jerry Rice, San Francisco 49ers (AP, NEA, PFWA, PFW, TSN)	Andre Reed, Buffalo Bills (AP-2, NEA-2); Ernest Givens, Houston Oilers (AP-2); Sterling Sharpe, Green Bay Packers (NEA-2)
Tight end	Keith Jackson, Philadelphia Eagles (AP, NEA, PFWA, PFW, TSN)	Rodney Holman, Cincinnati Bengals (AP-2, NEA-2)
Tackle	Jim Lachey, Washington Redskins (AP, NEA, PFWA, PFW, TSN); Anthony Muñoz, Cincinnati Bengals (AP, NEA, PFWA, PFW); John Alt, Kansas City Chiefs (TSN)	John Alt, Kansas City (AP-2); Lomas Brown, Detroit Lions (NEA-2); Bruce Armstrong, New England Patriots (NEA-2); Luis Sharpe, Phoenix Cardinals (AP-2)
Guard	Bruce Matthews, Houston Oilers (AP, PFWA, NEA, PFW, TSN); Steve Wisniewski, Los Angeles Raiders (PFWA, PFW, TSN); Randall McDaniel, Minnesota Vikings (AP); Mark Bortz, Chicago Bears (NEA)	Steve Wisniewski, Los Angeles Raiders (AP-2, NEA-2); Randall McDaniel, Minnesota Vikings (NEA-2); Mike Munchak, Houston Oilers (AP-2)
Center	Kent Hull, Buffalo Bills (AP, NEA, PFWA, PFW, TSN)	Jay Hilgenberg, Chicago Bears (AP-2); Don Mosebar, Los Angeles Raiders (NEA-2)

Special teams
Position	First team	Second team
Kicker	Nick Lowery, Kansas City Chiefs (AP, NEA, PFWA, PFW, TSN)	Pete Stoyanovich, Miami Dolphins (AP-2); John Carney, San Diego Chargers (NEA-2)
Punter	Sean Landeta, New York Giants (AP, NEA, PFWA, PFW, TSN)	Rohn Stark, Indianapolis Colts (AP-2, NEA-2)
Kick Returner	Mel Gray, Detroit Lions (AP, PFWA, TSN, PFW)	Dave Meggett, New York Giants (AP-2)
Punt Returner	Dave Meggett, New York Giants (PFWA, TSN); Clarence Verdin, Indianapolis Colts (PFW)	
Special Teams	Reyna Thompson, New York Giants (PFW)	

Defense
Position	First team	Second team
Defensive end	Reggie White, Philadelphia Eagles (AP, NEA-DT, PFWA, PFW); Bruce Smith, Buffalo Bills (AP, NEA, PFWA, PFW, TSN); Greg Townsend, Los Angeles Raiders (NEA, TSN)	Greg Townsend, Los Angeles Raiders (AP-2); Chris Doleman, Minnesota Vikings (NEA-2); Jeff Cross, Miami Dolphins (NEA-2); Richard Dent, Chicago Bears (AP-2)
Defensive tackle	Michael Dean Perry, Cleveland Browns (AP, PFWA, NEA, PFW, TSN); Ray Childress, Houston Oilers (PFWA, TSN); Jerome Brown, Philadelphia Eagles (AP); Dan Saleaumua, Kansas City Chiefs (PFW)	Ray Childress, Houston Oilers (AP-2, NEA-2); Jerry Ball, Detroit Lions (AP-2); Dan Saleaumua, Kansas City Chiefs (NEA-2)
Inside linebacker	John Offerdahl, Miami Dolphins (AP, NEA, PFWA, PFW, TSN); Pepper Johnson, New York Giants (AP, NEA, PFWA, PFW, TSN)	Shane Conlan, Buffalo Bills (AP-2); Mike Singletary, Chicago Bears (AP-2); Byron Evans, Philadelphia Eagles (NEA-2); Vaughan Johnson, New Orleans Saints (NEA-2)
Outside linebacker	Charles Haley, San Francisco 49ers (AP, NEA, PFWA, PFW); Derrick Thomas, Kansas City Chiefs (AP, NEA, PFWA, PFW, TSN); Darryl Talley, Buffalo Bills (TSN)	Pat Swilling, New Orleans Saints (AP-2); Lawrence Taylor, New York Giants (AP-2); Mike Cofer, Detroit Lions (NEA-2); Leslie O'Neal, San Diego Chargers (NEA-2)
Cornerback	Rod Woodson, Pittsburgh Steelers (AP, NEA, PFWA, PFW, TSN); Albert Lewis, Kansas City Chiefs (AP, NEA, PFWA, TSN); Darrell Green, Washington Redskins (PFW)	Darrell Green, Washington Redskins (AP-2); Tim McKyer, Miami Dolphins (NEA-2); Gill Byrd, San Diego Chargers (NEA-2); Kevin Ross, Kansas City Chiefs (AP-2)
Safety	Joey Browner, Minnesota Vikings (AP, NEA, PFWA, PFW, TSN); Ronnie Lott, San Francisco 49ers (AP, NEA, PFWA, TSN); Mark Carrier, Chicago Bears (PFW)	Mark Carrier, Chicago Bears (AP-2); Tim McDonald, Phoenix Cardinals (NEA-2); Steve Atwater, Denver Broncos (NEA-2); David Fulcher, Cincinnati Bengals (AP-2)

== Key ==
- AP = Associated Press first-team All-Pro
- AP-2 = Associated Press second-team All-Pro
- NEA = Newspaper Enterprise Association first-team All-Pro team
- NEA-2 = Newspaper Enterprise Association second-team All-Pro team
- PFW = Pro Football Weekly All-Pro team
- PFWA = Pro Football Writers Association All-NFL
- TSN = The Sporting News All-Pro
