= Ethan Horton =

American football player (born 1962)

No. 32, 23, 88, 89
- Positions: Tight end, running back

Personal information
- Born: December 19, 1962 (age 63); Kannapolis, North Carolina, U.S.
- Listed height: 6 ft 4 in (1.93 m)
- Listed weight: 235 lb (107 kg)

Career information
- High school: A.L. Brown (Kannapolis)
- College: North Carolina
- NFL draft: 1985: 1st round, 15th overall pick

Career history
- Kansas City Chiefs (1985); Los Angeles Raiders (1987, 1989–1993); Washington Redskins (1994)

Awards and highlights
- Pro Bowl (1991); Second-team All-American (1984); 2× First-team All-ACC (1983, 1984); North Carolina Tar Heels Jersey No. 12 honored

Career NFL statistics
- Receptions: 212
- Receiving yards: 2,360
- Rushing yards: 241
- Total touchdowns: 20
- Stats at Pro Football Reference

Ethan Shane Horton (born December 19, 1962) is an American former professional football player who was a tight end in the National Football League (NFL). He played one season as a running back for the Kansas City Chiefs (1985), and seven seasons as a tight end for the Los Angeles Raiders (1987, 1989–1993), and the Washington Redskins (1994).

== College career ==
Horton played college football at the University of North Carolina, where he was an all-ACC running back and 1984 ACC Player of the Year. In 1981, he was named the co-MVP of the Gator Bowl, and in 1982 he shared MVP honors with two teammates in the Sun Bowl. Horton rushed for 1,107 yards as a junior and 1,247 as a senior. Overall, he rushed for 3,074 yards, caught 46 passes for 495 yards, and scored 27 touchdowns.

== Professional career ==
Horton was selected by the Chiefs in the first round with the 15th overall pick of the 1985 NFL draft. He caught 28 passes in his rookie season, but had a dismal year running the ball, finishing the season with just 146 rushing yards. He was widely considered a bust and cut by the Chiefs at the end of the year. Horton managed to sign on with the Raiders in 1987, but played in just four games and was cut during training camp in 1988. He then returned to North Carolina as an athletic counselor, but was called back to the Raiders in 1989 by owner Al Davis, who had him converted to the tight end position. Although he saw limited playing time in 1989, this ultimately paid off as he caught 33 passes in 1990, and scored a 41-yard touchdown reception in the team's divisional playoff win in the postseason.

Horton had his best season in 1991, when he caught 53 passes for 650 yards and five touchdowns, which earned him his only career selection to the Pro Bowl. He added 77 more receptions with his next two years on the Raiders, and finished his NFL career with the Redskins in 1994. Horton finished his career with 212 receptions for 2,360 yards and 17 touchdowns, along with 241 yards and 3 touchdowns rushing the ball.

== NFL career statistics ==
Legend
**Bold**	Career high

=== Regular season ===
Year	Team	Games		Receiving				
Year	Team	GP	GS	Rec	Yds	Avg	Lng	TD
1985	KAN	16	0	28	185	6.6	22	1
1987	RAI	4	2	3	44	**14.7**	32	1
1989	RAI	16	1	4	44	11.0	20	1
1990	RAI	16	14	33	404	12.2	36	3
1991	RAI	16	16	**53**	**650**	12.3	**52**	**5**
1992	RAI	16	16	33	409	12.4	30	2
1993	RAI	16	16	43	467	10.9	32	1
1994	WAS	16	15	15	157	10.5	20	3
		116	80	212	2,360	11.1	52	17

=== Postseason ===
Year	Team	Games		Receiving				
Year	Team	GP	GS	Rec	Yds	Avg	Lng	TD
1990	RAI	2	2	**7**	**102**	14.6	**41**	**1**
1991	RAI	1	1	3	59	**19.7**	28	0
1993	RAI	2	2	5	87	17.4	36	**1**
		5	5	15	248	16.5	41	2
