= Jeff Jaeger =

American football player (born 1964)

No. 8, 18, 1
- Position: Placekicker

Personal information
- Born: November 26, 1964 (age 61); Tacoma, Washington, U.S.
- Listed height: 5 ft 11 in (1.80 m)
- Listed weight: 190 lb (86 kg)

Career information
- High school: Kent-Meridian (Kent, Washington)
- College: Washington
- NFL draft: 1987: 3rd round, 82nd overall pick

Career history
- Cleveland Browns (1987–1988); Los Angeles/Oakland Raiders (1989–1995); Chicago Bears (1996–1999)

Awards and highlights
- First-team All-Pro (1991); Pro Bowl (1991); NFL scoring leader (1993); PFWA All-Rookie Team (1987); Consensus All-American (1986); First-team All-Pac-10 (1986)

Career NFL statistics
- Field goal attempts: 309
- Field goals: 229
- Extra point attempts: 327
- Extra points: 321
- Stats at Pro Football Reference

Jeff Todd Jaeger (born November 26, 1964) is an American former professional football player who was a placekicker for 12 seasons in the National Football League (NFL) during the 1980s and 1990s. Jaeger played college football for the Washington Huskies, earning All-American honors. In the NFL, he played for the Cleveland Browns, Los Angeles/Oakland Raiders and Chicago Bears.

== Early life ==
Jaeger was born in Tacoma, Washington. He was a standout kicker for Kent-Meridian High School in Kent, Washington. Jaeger was not offered scholarships out of high school and chose to walk on the football team at the University of Washington.

== College career ==
At Washington, Jaeger took over for outgoing All-American placekicker Chuck Nelson in 1983 and earned Honorable Mention in the AP's All-America team as a freshman. Jaeger would repeat as an AP honorable mention All-America selection in his sophomore season. Following Jaeger's junior year he was selected as a 2nd Team All-American by Football News. Following his senior season, in which the Huskies went 8–3–1, Jaeger was a consensus All-American, selected as a 1st Team All-American by both the AP and UPI.

Jaeger is still the all-time Washington Husky scoring leader with 358 points. He held the NCAA record with 80 career field goals until it was broken in 2003 by Billy Bennett of Georgia (Jaeger finished with 21 more field goals than the second leading kicker in Husky history). In his senior season, Jaeger converted 17 of 21 field goal attempts, including six of seven of 40 yards or more, as well as converting 42 of 43 extra point tries.

== Professional career ==
Pre-draft measurables
Height	Weight	Arm length	Hand span	40-yard dash	10-yard split	20-yard split	20-yard shuttle	Vertical jump	Broad jump	Bench press
5 ft 11 3/8 in (1.81 m)	190 lb (86 kg)	30 in (0.76 m)	8 1/2 in (0.22 m)	4.96 s	1.70 s	2.87 s	4.49 s	26.0 in (0.66 m)	8 ft 7 in (2.62 m)	6 reps
All values from NFL Combine

The Cleveland Browns selected Jaeger in the third round (82nd pick overall) of the 1987 NFL draft. He played for the Browns for a single season in 1987. In his rookie season, Jaeger broke all of the Browns rookie scoring records with 75 points despite playing in only ten games. His record for most field goal attempts by a rookie in a game was tied in 2017 by Zane Gonzalez.

Jaeger was voted to his first Pro Bowl in 1991. He tied the Raiders franchise record for longest field goal with a 54-yarder in 1992 which was broken in 2011 by Sebastian Janikowski with a 63 yard field goal. In 1993, he led the NFL in scoring and set a new Raider record with 132 points. That same year he also led the NFL in complete field goals and tied the all-time NFL mark for field goal attempts. During a game against the Denver Broncos, Jaeger kicked a 53-yard field goal to win the game. His kick was seemingly low and yet managed to cross the uprights. Jaeger led the Raiders in scoring during five consecutive seasons and consistently ranked in the top ten in the league in scoring. Jaeger eventually spent his last years with the Chicago Bears. In 1999, Jaeger injured his hip, and was released, but was then re-signed two days later.

== Personal life ==
Jaeger is married and has two daughters. He also volunteered as a kicking consultant at Eastlake High School.

== NFL career statistics ==
Career high/best bolded

Regular season statistics
Season	Team (record)	G	FGM	FGA	%	<20	20-29	30-39	40-49	50+	LNG	BLK	XPM	XPA	%	PTS
1987	CLE (10–5)	10	14	22	63.6	0–0	6–6	3–6	5–9	0–1	48	0	33	33	**100.0**	75
1989	LA (8–8)	16	23	34	67.6	1–1	8–10	8–9	5–12	1–2	50	0	34	34	**100.0**	103
1990	LA (12–4)	16	15	20	75.0	1–1	5–5	2–3	6–9	1–2	50	0	**40**	**42**	95.2	85
1991	LA (9–7)	16	29	34	**85.3**	**3–3**	7–7	10–13	7–7	2–4	53	2	29	30	96.7	116
1992	LA (7–9)	16	15	26	57.7	0–0	3–5	4–6	5–9	3–6	**54**	**3**	28	28	**100.0**	73
1993	LA (10–6)	16	**35**	**44**	79.5	0–0	**12–12**	**13–15**	6–10	**4–7**	53	**3**	27	29	93.1	**132**
1994	LA (9–7)	16	22	28	78.6	1–1	5–5	6–9	8–11	2–2	51	1	31	31	**100.0**	97
1995	OAK (8–8)	11	13	18	72.2	0–0	4–5	6–7	3–5	0–1	46	0	22	22	**100.0**	61
1996	CHI (7–9)	13	19	23	82.6	0–0	4–4	3–4	**12–15**	0–0	49	0	23	23	**100.0**	80
1997	CHI (4–12)	16	21	26	80.8	0–0	8–9	8–10	4–6	1–1	52	1	20	20	**100.0**	83
1998	CHI (4–12)	16	21	26	80.8	2–2	8–9	9–10	1–4	1–1	52	0	27	28	96.4	90
1999	CHI (6–10)	3	2	8	25.0	0–0	0–0	0–2	1–5	1–1	52	0	7	7	**100.0**	13
Career (12 seasons)		165	229	309	74.1	8–8	70–77	72–84	63–102	16–28	54	10	321	327	98.2	1008

== See also ==
- Washington Huskies football statistical leaders
