= 1991 All-Pro Team =

Official list of the best NFL players in 1991

The 1991 All-Pro Team is composed of the National Football League players that were named to the Associated Press, Newspaper Enterprise Association, Pro Football Writers Association, Pro Football Weekly, and The Sporting News All-Pro Teams in 1991. Both first and second teams are listed for the AP and NEA teams. These are the five teams that are included in Total Football II: The Official Encyclopedia of the National Football League.

== Teams ==
Offense
Position	First team	Second team
Quarterback	Jim Kelly, Buffalo Bills (AP, NEA, PFWA, PFW, TSN)	Mark Rypien, Washington Redskins (AP-2, NEA-2)
Running back	Barry Sanders, Detroit Lions (AP, NEA, PFWA, PFW, TSN); Thurman Thomas, Buffalo Bills (AP, NEA, PFWA, PFW, TSN)	Earnest Byner, Washington Redskins (AP-2); Emmitt Smith, Dallas Cowboys (AP-2, NEA-2); Christian Okoye, Kansas City Chiefs (NEA-2)
Wide receiver	Michael Irvin, Dallas Cowboys (AP, NEA, PFWA, PFW, TSN); Haywood Jeffires, Houston Oilers (AP, PFWA); Jerry Rice, San Francisco 49ers (PFW, TSN); Andre Rison, Atlanta Falcons (NEA)	Andre Rison, Atlanta Falcons (AP-2); Gary Clark, Washington Redskins (AP-2); Haywood Jeffires, Houston Oilers (NEA-2); Jerry Rice, San Francisco 49ers (NEA-2)
Tight end	Marv Cook, New England Patriots (AP, NEA, PFWA, PFW, TSN)	Jay Novacek, Dallas Cowboys (AP-2, NEA-2)
Tackle	Mike Kenn, Atlanta Falcons (AP, PFWA, PFW); Jim Lachey, Washington Redskins (AP, NEA, PFWA, PFW, TSN); Lomas Brown, Detroit Lions (NEA); Anthony Muñoz, Cincinnati Bengals (TSN)	Paul Gruber, Tampa Bay Buccaneers (NEA-2); Mike Kenn, Atlanta Falcons (NEA-2); Anthony Muñoz, Cincinnati Bengals (AP-2); Lomas Brown, Detroit Lions (AP-2)
Guard	Steve Wisniewski, Los Angeles Raiders (AP, NEA, PFWA, PFW, TSN); Mike Munchak, Houston Oilers (AP, PFWA, PFW); Randall McDaniel, Minnesota Vikings (NEA, TSN)	Jim Ritcher, Buffalo Bills (AP-2, NEA-2); Randall McDaniel, Minnesota Vikings (AP-2); Mike Munchak, Houston Oilers (NEA-2)
Center	Kent Hull, Buffalo Bills (AP, PFWA); Bruce Matthews, Houston Oilers (NEA, PFW); Don Mosebar, Los Angeles Raiders (TSN)	Bruce Matthews, Houston Oilers (AP-2); Don Mosebar, Los Angeles Raiders (NEA-2)

Special teams
Position	First team	Second team
Kicker	Jeff Jaeger, Los Angeles Raiders (AP, PFWA, PFW); Chip Lohmiller, Washington Redskins (TSN); Pete Stoyanovich, Miami Dolphins (NEA)	Chip Lohmiller, Washington Redskins (AP-2); Jeff Jaeger, Los Angeles Raiders (NEA-2)
Punter	Jeff Gossett, Los Angeles Raiders (AP, NEA, PFWA, PFW, TSN)	Reggie Roby, Miami Dolphins (AP-2, NEA-2)
Kick Returner	Mel Gray, Detroit Lions (AP, PFW, TSN)	Brian Mitchell, Washington Redskins (AP-2)
Punt Returner	Mel Gray, Detroit Lions (PFW, TSN)	
Special Teams	Steve Tasker, Buffalo Bills (PFW)	

Defense
Position	First team	Second team
Defensive end	Clyde Simmons, Philadelphia Eagles (AP, NEA, PFWA, PFW, TSN); Reggie White, Philadelphia Eagles (AP, NEA, PFWA, PFW, TSN)	Greg Townsend, Los Angeles Raiders (AP-2, NEA-2); Charles Mann, Washington Redskins (AP-2); Jeff Lageman, New York Jets (NEA-2)
Defensive tackle	Jerry Ball, Detroit Lions (AP, PFWA, PFW, TSN); Jerome Brown, Philadelphia Eagles (AP, PFWA, PFW, TSN); Michael Dean Perry, Cleveland Browns (TSN); Ray Childress, Houston Oilers (NEA)	Steve McMichael, Chicago Bears (AP-2); Michael Dean Perry, Cleveland Browns (AP-2, NEA-2); Cortez Kennedy, Seattle Seahawks (NEA-2)
Inside linebackers	Sam Mills, New Orleans Saints (PFWA, PFW, TSN); Mike Singletary, Chicago Bears (AP, TSN); Al Smith, Houston Oilers (PFWA, PFW); Chris Spielman, Detroit Lions (AP); Junior Seau, San Diego Chargers (NEA)	Vincent Brown, New England Patriots (AP-2, NEA-2); Sam Mills, New Orleans Saints (AP-2, NEA-2)
Outside linebacker	Pat Swilling, New Orleans Saints (AP, NEA, PFWA, PFW, TSN); Derrick Thomas, Kansas City Chiefs (AP, PFW, TSN); Cornelius Bennett, Buffalo Bills (NEA); Seth Joyner, Philadelphia Eagles (PFWA, NEA-ILB)	Seth Joyner, Philadelphia Eagles (AP-2); Derrick Thomas, Kansas City Chiefs (NEA-2); Wilber Marshall, Washington Redskins (AP-2, NEA-2)
Cornerback	Cris Dishman, Houston Oilers (AP, PFW); Deion Sanders, Atlanta Falcons (NEA, PFWA, TSN); Darrell Green, Washington Redskins (AP, NEA, PFWA, PFW, TSN)	Eric Allen, Philadelphia Eagles (AP-2, NEA-2); Rod Woodson, Pittsburgh Steelers (NEA-2); Deion Sanders, Atlanta Falcons (AP-2)
Safety	Ronnie Lott, Los Angeles Raiders (AP, PFWA, PFW, TSN); Steve Atwater, Denver Broncos (AP, NEA, PFWA, PFW); Mark Carrier, Chicago Bears (NEA, TSN)	Tim McDonald, Phoenix Cardinals (AP-2, NEA-2); Bubba McDowell, Houston Oilers (AP-2); Bennie Blades, Detroit Lions (NEA-2)

== Key ==
- AP = Associated Press first-team All-Pro
- AP-2 = Associated Press second-team All-Pro
- NEA = Newspaper Enterprise Association first-team All-Pro team
- NEA-2 = Newspaper Enterprise Association second-team All-Pro team
- PFW = Pro Football Weekly All-Pro team
- PFWA = Pro Football Writers Association All-NFL
- TSN = The Sporting News All-Pro
