= Steve Smith (running back) =

American football player (1964–2021)

No. 35
- Position: Fullback

Personal information
- Born: August 30, 1964; Washington, D.C., U.S.
- Died: November 20, 2021 (aged 57); Richardson, Texas, U.S.
- Listed height: 6 ft 1 in (1.85 m)
- Listed weight: 242 lb (110 kg)

Career information
- High school: DeMatha Catholic (Hyattsville, Maryland)
- College: Penn State
- NFL draft: 1987: 3rd round, 81st overall pick

Career history
- Los Angeles Raiders (1987–1993); Seattle Seahawks (1994–1995)

Awards and highlights
- National champion (1986)

Career NFL statistics
- Rushing yards: 1,627
- Rushing average: 3.8
- Rushing touchdowns: 9
- Stats at Pro Football Reference

Steven Anthony Smith (August 30, 1964 – November 20, 2021) was an American professional football player who was a fullback for nine seasons in the National Football League (NFL) with the Los Angeles Raiders and Seattle Seahawks. He was a team captain on the Penn State Nittany Lions's national championship team in 1986.

Pre-draft measurables
Height	Weight	Arm length	Hand span	Bench press
6 ft 0 7/8 in (1.85 m)	244 lb (111 kg)	31 in (0.79 m)	10 3/4 in (0.27 m)	12 reps

Smith was a third-round draft choice of the Raiders in the 1987 NFL draft. Converted to fullback, Smith blocked for Raiders star running backs Bo Jackson and Marcus Allen. He then spent two seasons with Seattle until a back injury ended his career. Although primarily a blocker, he finished his career with 1627 rushing yards and 13 receiving touchdowns.

In 1995, Smith won the inaugural Madden Bowl, a tournament during Super Bowl weekend in which current and former NFL players compete at the Madden NFL video game.

== NFL career statistics ==
Legend
**Bold**	Career high

=== Regular season ===
Year	Team	Games		Rushing					Receiving				
Year	Team	GP	GS	Att	Yds	Avg	Lng	TD	Rec	Yds	Avg	Lng	TD
1987	RAI	7	3	5	18	3.6	15	0	3	46	**15.3**	32	0
1988	RAI	**16**	6	38	162	**4.3**	**21**	**3**	26	**299**	11.5	**45**	**6**
1989	RAI	**16**	**16**	**117**	**471**	4.0	**21**	1	19	140	7.4	14	0
1990	RAI	**16**	15	81	327	4.0	17	2	4	30	7.5	17	3
1991	RAI	**16**	**16**	62	265	**4.3**	19	1	15	130	8.7	37	1
1992	RAI	**16**	15	44	129	2.9	15	0	**28**	217	7.8	19	1
1993	RAI	**16**	13	47	156	3.3	13	0	18	187	10.4	22	0
1994	SEA	**16**	0	26	80	3.1	12	2	11	142	12.9	25	1
1995	SEA	9	7	9	19	2.1	4	0	7	59	8.4	17	1
		128	91	429	1,627	3.8	21	9	131	1,250	9.5	45	13

=== Playoffs ===
Year	Team	Games		Rushing					Receiving				
Year	Team	GP	GS	Att	Yds	Avg	Lng	TD	Rec	Yds	Avg	Lng	TD
1990	RAI	**2**	**2**	**9**	**37**	**4.1**	**7**	0	**1**	5	5.0	5	0
1991	RAI	1	1	3	6	2.0	3	0	**1**	**9**	**9.0**	**9**	0
1993	RAI	**2**	0	0	0	0.0	0	0	0	0	0.0	0	0
		5	3	12	43	3.6	7	0	2	14	7.0	9	0

== After football ==
Smith married former Raiderette Chie Smith from Los Angeles, CA in December 1989. The couple had two children, Dante and Jazmin and lived in Richardson, Texas. Smith had been afflicted with Lou Gehrig's disease from July 2002 until his death. He could not speak because of a ventilator and received his food through a feeding tube. He communicated via a state of the art computer system paid for by The Steve Gleason Foundation.

Smith was the focus of an August 17, 2010, episode of HBO's Real Sports with Bryant Gumbel exploring how toxic proteins that form after brain trauma may cause Lou Gehrig's disease. He died on November 20, 2021, after suffering from ALS for almost 20 years.
