= Mervyn Fernandez =

American gridiron football player (born 1959)

No. 24, 86
- Position: Wide receiver

Personal information
- Born: December 29, 1959 (age 66); Merced, California, U.S.
- Listed height: 6 ft 3 in (1.91 m)
- Listed weight: 205 lb (93 kg)

Career information
- High school: Andrew Hill (San Jose, California)
- College: San Jose State
- NFL draft: 1983: 10th round, 277th overall pick

Career history
- BC Lions (1982–1986); Los Angeles Raiders (1987–1992); San Francisco 49ers (1993)*; BC Lions (1994)
- * Offseason or practice squad member only

Awards and highlights
- 2× Grey Cup champion (1985, 1994); 2× CFL All-Star (1984, 1985); CFL's Outstanding Player Award (1985); Jeff Nicklin Memorial Trophy (1985); Jackie Parker Trophy (1982)

Career NFL statistics
- Receptions: 209
- Receiving yards: 3,764
- Receiving touchdowns: 19
- Stats at Pro Football Reference

Career CFL statistics
- Receptions: 399
- Receiving yards: 6,690
- Touchdowns: 57
- Canadian Football Hall of Fame

Mervyn L. Fernandez (born December 29, 1959), nicknamed "Swervin' Mervyn", is an American former professional football player who was a wide receiver for the BC Lions of the Canadian Football League (CFL) and the Los Angeles Raiders of the National Football League (NFL).

Fernandez was a two-time CFL All-Star (1984–1985) and is a member of the BC Lions Wall of Fame. In 2003, Fernandez was voted a member of the BC Lions All-Time Dream Team, at the wide receiver position, as part of the club's 50-year anniversary celebration. In 2006, Fernandez was voted one of the CFL's Top 50 players (#42) of the league's modern era by Canadian sports network TSN.

He was inducted into the Canadian Football Hall of Fame in 2019.

== Early life and college ==
Fernandez was a standout wide receiver for Andrew Hill High School in San Jose, California, where he picked up his famous nickname "Swervin' Mervyn" from the team's quarterback.

Following high school, Fernandez played at DeAnza Junior College in Cupertino, California, before finishing his college career at nearby San José State University. It was at San José State that the Los Angeles Raiders staff members took notice of the 6′3″, 205 pound, speedy wide receiver, and the Raiders eventually made Fernandez their 10th round pick in the 1983 NFL draft.

== CFL career ==
Fernandez spent his entire six-year CFL career (1982–1986, 1994) with the BC Lions. Fernandez joined the Lions in 1982, and made an immediate impact, finishing his rookie season with over 1,000 receiving yards (1,046), and helping his team to 9–7 record. Fernandez won the CFL Western Division Most Outstanding Rookie award, being a finalist for the CFL's Most Outstanding Rookie award.

After two 1,000-yard seasons, Fernandez was a key component in the BC Lions Grey Cup championship season of 1985. Fernandez finished the season with 95 catches and 1,727 yards for an 18.2 yards per reception average, along with 15 touchdowns. Despite being injured and not playing in the game, following the Lions' 37–24 triumph over the Hamilton Tiger-Cats in the 73rd Grey Cup, Fernandez became the first Lion to win the CFL's Most Outstanding Player Award.

Fernandez, a two-time CFL All-Star (1984-1985) and member of the BC Lions Wall of Fame, was finally persuaded by Al Davis and the Raiders to head south and join the NFL, following the 1986 CFL season.

In 2003, Fernandez was voted a member of the BC Lions All-Time Dream Team, at the wide receiver position, as part of the club's 50-year anniversary celebration. In November 2006, Fernandez was voted one of the CFL's top 50 players (#42) of the league's modern era by Canadian sports network TSN.

=== CFL statistics ===
Year	Team	Receiving					
Year	Team	G	Rec	Yds	Avg	Lng	TD
1982	BC Lions	16	64	1,046	16.3	84	8
1983	BC Lions	16	78	1,284	16.5	74	10
1984	BC Lions	15	89	1,486	16.7	78	17
1985	BC Lions	16	95	1,727	18.2	90	15
1986	BC Lions	11	48	865	18.0	72	5
1994	BC Lions	9	25	282	11.3	35	2
Total		83	399	6690	16.8	90	57

== NFL career ==
Fernandez spent his entire 6-year NFL career (1987–1992) with one team: the Los Angeles Raiders. During that span, Fernandez played in 86 games and amassed 209 catches for 3,764 yards and 19 touchdowns. While Fernandez never made the Pro Bowl, he did leave his mark on the Raiders’ record books. His 209 career catches are 10th most by any receiver in Raiders’ history. His 3,764 career receiving yards ranks him number 8 all-time. His 18.01 average yards per catch for his career is first among any receiver to wear the Raiders' Silver and Black. In 1988, Fernandez led NFL receivers in average yards per catch (26.0).

Arguably, Fernandez's finest year was 1989, when he made 57 catches for 1,069 yards and 9 touchdowns, leading all Raiders’ receivers in almost every major category, and becoming only the sixth Raider to gain over 1,000 receiving yards in a season.

=== NFL career statistics ===
Legend
	Led the league
**Bold**	Career high

=== Regular season ===
Year	Team	Games		Receiving				
Year	Team	GP	GS	Rec	Yds	Avg	Lng	TD
1987	RAI	7	7	14	236	16.9	47	0
1988	RAI	**16**	1	31	805	**26.0**	**85**	4
1989	RAI	**16**	13	**57**	**1,069**	18.8	75	**9**
1990	RAI	**16**	**15**	52	839	16.1	66	5
1991	RAI	**16**	13	46	694	15.1	59	1
1992	RAI	15	1	9	121	13.4	21	0
		86	50	209	3,764	18.0	85	19

=== Playoffs ===
Year	Team	Games		Receiving				
Year	Team	GP	GS	Rec	Yds	Avg	Lng	TD
1990	RAI	**2**	**2**	**6**	**81**	**13.5**	**26**	**1**
1991	RAI	1	1	2	12	6.0	8	0
		3	3	8	93	11.6	26	1

== Post-football life ==
Fernandez currently lives in Morgan Hill, California and works as a sales representative. He is also an avid sport fisherman. His son, Joe Fernandez, was a wide receiver at Fresno State University, who tried out but failed to make the final roster of the NFL's Seattle Seahawks in 2007.
