= Charles Henry (American football) =

American football player (born 1964)

No. 80, 87
- Position: Tight end

Personal information
- Born: April 8, 1964 (age 62); St. Petersburg, Florida, U.S.

Career information
- High school: St. Petersburg (FL) Northeast
- College: Miami (FL)
- NFL draft: 1988: undrafted

Career history
- Los Angeles Raiders (1988); Dallas Cowboys (1990)*; Miami Dolphins (1991); Frankfurt Galaxy (1992); Green Bay Packers (1992)
- * Offseason or practice squad member only

Awards and highlights
- National champion (1987)

Career NFL statistics
- Games played: 6
- Games started: 2
- Receptions: 2
- Receiving yards: 17
- Stats at Pro Football Reference

Charles W. Henry (born April 8, 1964) is an American former professional football player who was a tight end in the National Football League (NFL) and the World League of American Football (WLAF). He played for the Miami Dolphins of the NFL, and the Frankfurt Galaxy of the WLAF. Henry played collegiately at the University of Miami.
