= Jay Schroeder =

American football player (born 1961)

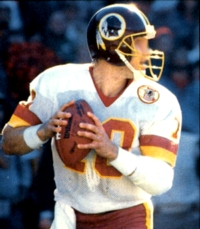
- Schroeder with the Washington Redskins in 1986

No. 10, 13, 11
- Position: Quarterback

Personal information
- Born: June 28, 1961 (age 65); Milwaukee, Wisconsin, U.S.
- Listed height: 6 ft 4 in (1.93 m)
- Listed weight: 215 lb (98 kg)

Career information
- High school: Palisades (Pacific Palisades, California)
- College: UCLA
- NFL draft: 1984: 3rd round, 83rd overall pick

Career history

Playing
- Washington Redskins (1984–1987); Los Angeles Raiders (1988–1992); Cincinnati Bengals (1993); Arizona Cardinals (1994)

Coaching
- Christian High School (2000–2006) Offensive coordinator; Snow Canyon High School (2007) Offensive coordinator & quarterbacks coach; Oaks Christian School Assistant coach; Desert Hills High School (2014–2021) Quarterbacks coach

Operations
- Village Christian Schools (2010–2013) Director of football operations; Awaken Christian Academy (2022-present) Director of football operations

Awards and highlights
- Super Bowl champion (XXII); Pro Bowl (1986)

Career NFL statistics
- Passing attempts: 2,807
- Passing completions: 1,426
- Completion percentage: 50.8%
- TD–INT: 114–108
- Passing yards: 20,063
- Passer rating: 71.7
- Rushing yards: 761
- Rushing touchdowns: 5
- Stats at Pro Football Reference

Jay Brian Schroeder (born June 28, 1961) is an American former professional football player who was a quarterback in the National Football League (NFL). He played college football for the UCLA Bruins, after which he was selected in the third round (83rd overall) of the 1984 NFL draft by the Washington Redskins, where he played for four seasons. He then played for the Los Angeles Raiders for five seasons and spent one season each with the Cincinnati Bengals and Arizona Cardinals.

While with the Washington Redskins, Schroeder was selected to the Pro Bowl after the 1986 season, where he threw for 4,109 yards. The following season, nagged by injury and a quarterback controversy, he made just ten starts as Doug Williams took the reins for the playoffs, which saw them win a Super Bowl over the Denver Broncos in Super Bowl XXII. He was traded to the Raiders a season later, where he would be the on-and-off starter for the next five seasons, which peaked with him leading the Raiders to a 12–4 record in 1990 and an appearance in the AFC Championship Game. After a season each with the Bengals and Cardinals, Schroeder retired in 1994, having thrown for 20,000 yards as a quarterback.

== Early life and college ==
Schroeder attended Palisades High School and was a high school football teammate of actor Forest Whitaker.

Schroeder played college football at UCLA playing 9 games during their 1980 season, in which he started only one game. He did produce a memorable moment, throwing a game-winning touchdown pass on a deflection to future NFL star Freeman McNeil to beat arch-rival USC. His college career statistics include 634 yards, 4 touchdowns and 3 interceptions. He also played minor league baseball in the Pioneer League.

== NFL career ==
=== Washington Redskins ===
Schroeder was selected in third round of the 1984 NFL draft with the 83rd overall pick by the Washington Redskins. He sat his rookie year behind veteran Joe Theismann.

Schroeder replaced an injured Theismann in a Monday Night Football game against the New York Giants (in what would be Theismann's final game of his career) on November 18, 1985. Schroeder's first pass after Theismann was taken off the field was a 43-yard completion to Art Monk. The Redskins came close to a touchdown after the catch, but a fumble by John Riggins inside the five yard line was recovered by Lawrence Taylor. Washington eventually won the game, 23–21, with Schroeder throwing the game winning touchdown pass.

Schroeder led the Redskins to a 4–1 record after that game. He gained the starting spot on the Redskins for the 1986 NFL season, and led them to a 12–4 record while throwing for a then team record 4,109 passing yards, a team record which stood for 29 years, but he remains the third all-time leader in single season passing for Washington. It would be the only time in his career that he threw over 3,000 yards in a season. He led Washington to the NFC title game where they were shut out 17–0 by the New York Giants. In a sign of things to come, Schroeder, seeing backup Doug Williams getting on the field (as told by Joe Gibbs), shooed him away during the NFC Championship loss.

The following season, Schroeder suffered a separated shoulder in the first game against the Philadelphia Eagles and was replaced by Doug Williams. The two never got along, with Williams stating that Schroeder had an ego problem, especially after making the Pro Bowl, which got worse when he was benched for Williams, who described him as such: "I don't think there was a hat in America that could have fit his head." The 1987 strike proved to be a bewildering one, as three games were played by replacement players before Williams and company returned. Schroeder would start all but one of the regular season games the rest of the season, but was continually nagged by the injury, allowing the more popular Williams to gain the starting position for the Redskins' playoff run; in total, the season saw five quarterback changes (not counting the strike players) that saw Schroeder go 8–2 as a starter that year (with four starts where he threw under 20 passes) but make no playoff starts.

=== Los Angeles Raiders ===
Williams led the Redskins to a championship victory that year in Super Bowl XXII. Schroeder was traded the following season to the Los Angeles Raiders for tackle Jim Lachey, who proved to be a perennial Pro Bowl player for the Redskins. Schroeder spent five seasons with the Raiders. He suffered with a torn rotator cuff on his left shoulder for most of the 1989 season. After two middling years where he did not play more than half of a season, he had his best year with the team in 1990. He threw for 2,849 yards with 19 touchdowns to nine interceptions. The 12–4 record was good enough to compete in the divisional round, where they faced the Cincinnati Bengals. He went 11-of-21 for 172 yards with two touchdowns and an interception in the 20–10 victory, although the game was marred by the hip injury to star running back Bo Jackson in the third quarter, who would never play football again. In the AFC Championship Game against the Buffalo Bills, Schroeder completed just 13 of 31 passes with five interceptions as the Bills rolled to a 51–3 victory.

The following year, the Raiders were 9-6 under Schroeder, but he was replaced by newly drafted Todd Marinovich, who played well enough in the finale to start in the ensuing playoff game against the Kansas City Chiefs, with Schroeder kept on the bench. The subsequent disaster of Marinovich in 1992 led to nine starts for Schroeder, but he was waived after the year ended for free agent Jeff Hostetler.

Schroeder retired in 1995 with 1,426 of 2,808 completions for 20,063 yards and 114 touchdowns, with 108 interceptions, while also rushing for 761 yards and five touchdowns. He finished with a record of 61–38 in games as a starter.

== NFL career statistics ==
Legend
	Won the Super Bowl
	Led the league
**Bold**	Career high

=== Regular season ===
Year	Team	Games			Passing									Rushing					Sacks	
Year	Team	GP	GS	Record	Cmp	Att	Pct	Yds	Y/A	Lng	TD	Int	Rtg	Att	Yds	Avg	Lng	TD	Sck	Yds
1985	WAS	9	5	4–1	112	209	53.6	1,458	7.0	53	5	5	73.8	17	30	1.8	14	0	15	114
1986	WAS	**16**	**16**	**12–4**	**276**	**541**	51.0	**4,109**	7.6	71	**22**	**22**	72.9	36	47	1.3	20	1	28	**240**
1987	WAS	11	10	8–2	129	267	48.3	1,878	7.0	84	12	10	71.0	26	120	4.6	**31**	**3**	17	149
1988	RAI	9	8	3–5	113	256	44.1	1,839	7.2	**85**	13	13	64.6	29	109	3.8	12	1	19	178
1989	RAI	11	9	4–5	91	194	46.9	1,550	8.0	84	8	13	60.3	15	38	2.5	19	0	20	132
1990	RAI	**16**	**16**	**12–4**	182	334	54.5	2,849	**8.5**	68	19	9	**90.8**	**37**	81	2.2	17	0	29	197
1991	RAI	15	15	9–6	189	357	52.9	2,562	7.2	78	15	16	71.4	28	76	2.7	15	0	**31**	238
1992	RAI	13	9	4–5	123	253	48.6	1,476	5.8	53	11	11	63.3	28	**160**	**5.7**	19	0	25	180
1993	CIN	9	3	0–3	78	159	49.1	832	5.2	37	5	2	70.0	10	41	4.1	20	0	13	87
1994	ARI	9	8	5–3	133	238	**55.9**	1,510	6.3	48	4	7	68.4	16	59	3.7	16	0	11	85
Career		118	99	61–38	1,426	2,807	50.8	20,063	7.1	85	114	108	71.7	242	761	3.1	31	5	208	1,600

=== Playoffs ===
Year	Team	Games			Passing									Rushing					Sacks	
Year	Team	GP	GS	Record	Cmp	Att	Pct	Yds	Y/A	Lng	TD	Int	Rtg	Att	Yds	Avg	Lng	TD	Sck	Yds
1986	WAS	**3**	**3**	**2–1**	**48**	**105**	45.7	**469**	4.5	**48**	**3**	2	**60.4**	**7**	14	2.0	11	0	**6**	**61**
1987	WAS	**3**	0	0–0	0	1	0.0	0	0.0	0	0	0	39.6	1	-8	-8.0	-8	0	1	8
1990	RAI	2	2	1–1	24	52	**46.2**	322	**6.2**	41	2	**6**	39.6	4	**33**	**8.3**	**12**	0	4	25
Career		8	5	3–2	72	158	45.6	791	5.0	48	5	8	50.4	12	39	3.3	12	0	11	94

== Baseball career ==
Schroeder began his sports career in the Toronto Blue Jays minor league system. He was drafted 3rd overall in the 1979 Major League Baseball draft by the Blue Jays. He had a career batting average of .213 in the minors. He was inducted in the Kinston Professional Baseball Hall of Fame in 1996.

== Coaching career ==
Starting in 2000, Schroeder was an offensive coordinator at Christian High School in El Cajon, California, a suburb of San Diego, under head coach Matt Oliver. In 2007, he coached at Snow Canyon High School, serving as both the offensive coordinator and quarterbacks coach. He then became an assistant coach for Oaks Christian High School in California.

In December 2010, Schroeder was hired as the director of football operations at Village Christian School in Sun Valley, California. He also coached Varsity and JV golf at Village Christian.

He has also occasionally worked as an analyst for Sky Sports' NFL coverage since November 2007.

Schroeder was formerly the quarterbacks coach at Desert Hills High School in St. George, Utah.

He is currently doing radio live in various parts of the Las Vegas/Henderson area with long-time Las Vegas CBS sportscaster, Rich Perez.
