= Garry Lewis (gridiron football) =

American football player (born 1967)

No. 21, 22, 17
- Position: Cornerback

Personal information
- Born: August 25, 1967 (age 59); New Orleans, Louisiana, U.S.
- Listed height: 5 ft 11 in (1.80 m)
- Listed weight: 185 lb (84 kg)

Career information
- High school: Walter L. Cohen (New Orleans)
- College: Alcorn State (1986–1989)
- NFL draft: 1990: 7th round, 173rd overall pick

Career history
- Los Angeles Raiders (1990–1991); Dallas Cowboys (1992)*; Tampa Bay Buccaneers (1992); Kansas City Chiefs (1993); Ottawa Rough Riders (1994–1995); Hamilton Tiger-Cats (1995–1996)
- * Offseason or practice squad member only

Career NFL statistics
- Interceptions: 1
- Stats at Pro Football Reference

Garry Lewis Jr. (born August 25, 1967) is an American former professional football player who was a cornerback for four seasons in the National Football League (NFL) with the Los Angeles Raiders, Tampa Bay Buccaneers and Kansas City Chiefs. He played college football for the Alcorn State Braves and was selected by the Raiders in the seventh round of the 1990 NFL draft. He also played for the Ottawa Rough Riders and Hamilton Tiger-Cats of the Canadian Football League (CFL).

== Early life and college ==
Garry Lewis Jr. was born on August 25, 1967, in New Orleans, Louisiana. He attended Walter L. Cohen High School in New Orleans.

He was a four-year letterman for the Braves of Alcorn State University from 1986 to 1989. He was inducted into the school's athletics hall of fame in 2023.

== Professional career ==
Lewis was selected by the Los Angeles Raiders in the seventh round, with the 173rd overall pick, of the 1990 NFL draft. He signed with the team on June 9. He was placed on injured reserve on September 24, moved to the practice squad on October 24, and promoted back to the active roster on November 4, 1990. Overall, Lewis played in 12 games, starting five, for the Raiders during the 1990 season. He also appeared in two playoff games that year, recording one interception. He played in all 16 games, starting two, in 1991. He was placed on injured reserve on December 25, 1991.

On February 1, 1992, Lewis was traded to the Dallas Cowboys for an undisclosed 1992 draft pick. He was also due to become a free agent that year. In mid July, he requested a trade due to strained contract negotiations. He officially signed with the Cowboys on July 21, 1992. His contract was noted as having an unusual "voidable option".

On August 26, 1992, Lewis was traded to the Tampa Bay Buccaneers for a 1993 ninth round draft pick. He played in 16 games, starting two, for the Buccaneers during the 1992 season and made one interception. He was released on July 26, 1993.

Lewis signed with the Kansas City Chiefs on September 8, 1993. He appeared in one game for the Chiefs before being released on September 15, 1993.

Lewis played in 14 games for the Ottawa Rough Riders of the Canadian Football League (CFL) in 1994, totaling 41 defensive tackles, nine special teams tackles, one interception, and four pass breakups. He also spent some time on the injured list that year. He was listed as a defensive halfback during his time with the Rough Riders. Lewis played in five games for the Rough Riders during the 1995 season, accumulating 21 defensive tackles, one special teams tackle, one interception, and one pass breakup. He was released in early August 1995.

On August 17, 1995, it was reported that Lewis had been signed to the practice roster of the CFL's Hamilton Tiger-Cats. He was moved back to cornerback while with the Tiger-Cats. He played in ten games for them during the 1995 season, recording 25 defensive tackles, six special teams tackles, five interceptions, and one pass breakup. Lewis played in nine games, all starts, in 1996, totaling 26 defensive tackles, one interception, and three pass breakups. He missed seven weeks during the middle of the year due to a broken ankle. He became a free agent after the season.

== Post-playing career ==
Lewis later became the Assistant Athletic Director for Compliance at Alcorn State.
