= Arthur Jimerson =

American football player (born 1968)

A.J. Jimerson
No. 58, 93
- Position: Linebacker

Personal information
- Born: May 12, 1968 (age 58); Erie, Pennsylvania, U.S.
- Listed height: 6 ft 3 in (1.91 m)
- Listed weight: 233 lb (106 kg)

Career information
- High school: Deep Creek (Chesapeake, Virginia)
- College: Norfolk State
- NFL draft: 1990: 8th round, 197th overall pick

Career history
- Los Angeles Raiders (1990–1991); New York/New Jersey Knights (1992); Ohio Glory (1992)
- Stats at Pro Football Reference

Arthur Jimerson (born May 12, 1968, in Erie, Pennsylvania) is a former linebacker for the former Los Angeles Raiders of the National Football League. He attended elementary and middle school in Norfolk, Virginia. He attended Deep Creek High School in Chesapeake, Virginia where he played high school football, basketball, and track. He was chosen as the Virginian Pilot Male Athlete of the Year. He attended Norfolk State University on a football scholarship before being drafted with the 197th overall pick in the eighth round in the 1990 NFL draft by the then Los Angeles Raiders.

After a knee injury ended his career he returned to Norfolk State University in Norfolk, Virginia, and earned a bachelor's degree in economics and a master's degree in Urban Studies. He is currently dean of students at Durham Nativity School in Durham, North Carolina. He is remarried now and has four children from a previous marriage.

He currently resides in Durham, North Carolina.
