= Tim Rother =

American football player (born 1965)

No. 78
- Position: Defensive tackle

Personal information
- Born: September 28, 1965 (age 61); St. Paul, Nebraska, U.S.
- Listed height: 6 ft 7 in (2.01 m)
- Listed weight: 285 lb (129 kg)

Career information
- High school: Bellevue (NE)
- College: Nebraska
- NFL draft: 1988: 4th round, 90th overall pick

Career history
- Los Angeles Raiders (1988–1990); Green Bay Packers (1992)*; Los Angeles Raiders (1993)*
- * Offseason or practice squad member only

Awards and highlights
- First-team All-Big Eight (1987)

Career NFL statistics
- Games played: 20
- Stats at Pro Football Reference

Tim Rother (born September 28, 1965) is an American former professional football player who was a defensive tackle for the Los Angeles Raiders of the National Football League (NFL) from 1989 to 1990. He played college football for the Nebraska Cornhuskers and was selected by the Raiders in the fourth round of the 1988 NFL draft.
