= Torin Dorn =

American football player (born 1968)

No. 46
- Position: Cornerback

Personal information
- Born: February 29, 1968 (age 58); Greenwood, South Carolina, U.S.
- Listed height: 6 ft 0 in (1.83 m)
- Listed weight: 200 lb (91 kg)

Career information
- High school: Southfield (Southfield, Michigan)
- College: North Carolina
- NFL draft: 1990: 4th round, 95th overall pick

Career history
- Los Angeles Raiders (1990–1994); St. Louis Rams (1995–1996)

Career NFL statistics
- Interceptions: 3
- Fumble recoveries: 2
- Touchdowns: 2
- Stats at Pro Football Reference

Torin Damon Dorn Sr. (born February 29, 1968) is an American former professional football player who was a cornerback in the National Football League. He played seven seasons for the Los Angeles Raiders (1990–1994) and the St. Louis Rams (1995–1996). He was selected by the Raiders in the fourth round of the 1990 NFL draft with the 95th overall pick. Dorn played college football for the North Carolina Tar Heels from 1986 to 1989. He played running back for the first three seasons, and then played defensive back as a senior.

One of his sons, Torin Dorn Jr., plays basketball for the NC State Wolfpack after transferring from the Charlotte 49ers following his freshman season. His other son, Myles Dorn, played college football for North Carolina and was signed to the Minnesota Vikings in 2020.
