= Don Mosebar =

American football player (born 1961)

No. 72
- Positions: Center, guard, tackle

Personal information
- Born: September 11, 1961 (age 65); Yakima, Washington, U.S.
- Listed height: 6 ft 6 in (1.98 m)
- Listed weight: 305 lb (138 kg)

Career information
- High school: Mt. Whitney (Visalia, California)
- College: USC
- NFL draft: 1983: 1st round, 26th overall pick

Career history
- Los Angeles/Oakland Raiders (1983–1995)

Awards and highlights
- Super Bowl champion (XVIII); First-team All-Pro (1991); Second-team All-Pro (1991); 3× Pro Bowl (1986, 1990, 1991); Unanimous All-American (1982); First-team All-Pac-10 (1982); Second-team All-Pac-10 (1981)

Career NFL statistics
- Games played: 173
- Games started: 159
- Fumble recoveries: 3
- Stats at Pro Football Reference

Donald Howard Mosebar (born September 11, 1961) is an American former professional football player who was a center for 13 seasons in the National Football League (NFL) during the 1980s and 1990s. Mosebar was selected in the first round of the 1983 NFL draft, and played for the NFL's Los Angeles Raiders.

== Early life ==
Mosebar was born in Yakima, Washington, and played high school football for Mt. Whitney High School in Visalia, California, guiding them to the Valley championship game as well as a win at the yearly Cow Hide. He played college football for the USC Trojans, earning Consensus All-American honors as a senior.

== Professional career ==
Mosebar was chosen by the Los Angeles Raiders as the 26th pick in the first round of the 1983 NFL draft, just ahead of future Hall of Famer Dan Marino. (Team executive Ron Wolf later said "To this day I call him 'Dan'—Dan Mosebar—because we blew Marino, and he knows that.") Mosebar immediately moved into the starting lineup as right guard for two years, before succeeding longtime center Dave Dalby upon his retirement. He was only the third starting center in franchise history; Dalby had inherited the center position from Jim Otto, who in turn had been the center since the team's inception in 1960.

In the 1986–1994 span, the Raiders reached the playoffs 3 times, in 1990, 1991, and 1993, with Art Shell as head coach. In his Raider career, Mosebar went to the Pro Bowl three times (1986, 1990, and 1991) and was an All-Pro in 1991. With Steve Wisniewski (1989–2001) on his left and Max Montoya (1990–1994) on his right, Mosebar anchored a trio of outstanding blockers combining for nine Pro Bowl appearances in the five years they were together (1990–1994), the span which included Mosebar's three years of playoff action.

In the 1990 NFL season, Shell's second year as head coach and first full year, and with Jay Schroeder as the starting quarterback, Los Angeles scored 337 points (21.1 points/game), 13th of 28 teams in the NFL and had a won-lost record of 12–4, winning the west division title of the AFC. The Raiders had beaten the Cincinnati Bengals in their 14th game with 185 rushing yards and now met them in a divisional round of the 1990–91 NFL playoffs. Once again, Mosebar, Wisniewski, and Montoya, with tackles Rory Graves and Steve Wright, overwhelmed the Bengals on the ground, this time with 235 yards. In that game Bo Jackson suffered a career-ending hip injury. Without Jackson, and unable to stop the no-huddle Buffalo Bills offense, the Raiders suffered a ridiculous 51–3 defeat in the AFC championship game.

In the 1991 NFL season, Los Angeles scored 298 points (18.6 points/game), 15th of 28 teams in the NFL, win a 9–7 record, 3rd in the AFC west but with a wild card slot in the 1991–92 NFL playoffs, and playing against the Kansas City Chiefs, a game the Raiders lost with the inexperienced Todd Marinovich at quarterback.

In the 1992 NFL season, Los Angeles was out of the playoffs with a 7–9 record, but came back stronger during the 1993 NFL season with Jeff Hostetler at starting quarterback, scoring 306 points (19.1 points/game), 14th of 28 teams in the NFL and with a 10–6 record, second in the AFC west but with a wild card game in the 1993–94 NFL playoffs against the Denver Broncos. With the same interior line as in the 90–91 playoffs, but with two new tackles, Gerald Perry and Bruce Wilkerson, the Raiders defeated the Broncos with 427 total yards of offense, but lost to the Bills again the following week, this time in the divisional round

In 1994, Mosebar's final year, the Raiders missed the playoffs. In 1995, the year the Raiders returned to Oakland, after starting every single game from 1990 to 1994, Mosebar suffered a career-ending injury during training camp, due to an inadvertent fist to the eye socket, which ultimately led to the removal of his left eye . From 1960 to 1994 (35 years), the Raiders fielded only 3 starting centers: Mosebar, Dalby, and Hall-of-Famer Jim Otto. In the 1995 NFL season, Mosebar was replaced by Dan Turk.

== Personal life ==
Mosebar is married to his longtime wife Tracey, and they have four daughters.
