= Derrick Crudup =

American football player (born 1965)

No. 23
- Positions: Defensive back, running back

Personal information
- Born: February 15, 1965 (age 61); Delray Beach, Florida, U.S.
- Listed height: 6 ft 2 in (1.88 m)
- Listed weight: 220 lb (100 kg)

Career information
- High school: Boca Raton (FL)
- College: Florida; Oklahoma
- NFL draft: 1988: 7th round, 171st overall pick

Career history
- Los Angeles Raiders (1988–1989); (1990); (1991); San Francisco 49ers (1992)*; Houston Oilers (1993)*
- * Offseason or practice squad member only

Awards and highlights
- National champion (1985)
- Stats at Pro Football Reference

Derrick Crudup (born February 15, 1965) is an American former professional football defensive back and running back. He played for the Los Angeles Raiders in 1989 and 1991. He was selected by the Raiders in the seventh round of the 1988 NFL draft.
