= Greg Townsend =

American football player (born 1961)

No. 93
- Position: Defensive end

Personal information
- Born: November 3, 1961 (age 65); Los Angeles, California, U.S.
- Listed height: 6 ft 3 in (1.91 m)
- Listed weight: 264 lb (120 kg)

Career information
- High school: Dominguez (Compton, California)
- College: Long Beach City (1979–1980); TCU (1981–1982)
- NFL draft: 1983: 4th round, 110th overall pick

Career history
- Los Angeles Raiders (1983–1993); Philadelphia Eagles (1994); Oakland Raiders (1997)

Awards and highlights
- Super Bowl champion (XVIII); 2× Second-team All-Pro (1990, 1991); 2× Pro Bowl (1990, 1991); PFWA All-Rookie Team (1983)

Career NFL statistics
- Tackles: 363
- Sacks: 109.5
- Safeties: 2
- Forced fumbles: 15
- Fumble recoveries: 8
- Interceptions: 3
- Interception yards: 117
- Defensive touchdowns: 4
- Stats at Pro Football Reference

Gregory Townsend Sr. (born November 3, 1961) is an American former professional football player who was a defensive end in the National Football League (NFL). He played college football at Long Beach City before transferring to TCU and was selected by the Los Angeles Raiders in the fourth round of the 1983 NFL draft. He also played for the Philadelphia Eagles.

== College career ==
He played college football at Long Beach City College in 1979 and 1980. He earned All-Conference, All-State and All-American honors when at the school. He transferred to Texas Christian, where he played two seasons. In 2008, he was enshrined into the CCCAA Hall of Fame.

== Professional career ==
Townsend was selected 110th overall by the Los Angeles Raiders in the fourth round of the 1983 NFL draft.

In his rookie season, he excelled early. He scored a touchdown in his third career game on September 19 against the Miami Dolphins on a fumble recovery. In the next game on September 25 against the Denver Broncos, he recorded a safety and his first two sacks as a player. He recorded eight further sacks in the season (one in which he did not even start a game), which included sacking the New York Giants three times on November 27. In the Raiders postseason run that year, he excelled, recorded a sack in each of the three postseason victories, which included a sack in Super Bowl XVIII. For his rookie season of 10.5 sacks (a team record for rookies that still stands), he finished sixth in voting for Defensive Rookie of the Year. Defensive teammate Howie Long argued that Townsend's sack total if put in a "four-man line situation, playing full time, you’re talking about a 25-sack, 20-holding-penalties player.”

In his second year, he recorded seven sacks. He rebounded the following two seasons with 10+ sacks each, with the 1986 season seeing him get his second three-sack game on November 16 against the Cleveland Browns. He also got a suspension for his actions in joining a brawl on October 5, 1986, against the Kansas City Chiefs. In the 1987 season, he recorded 8.5 sacks in 13 games. In 1988, despite being c he recorded 11.5 sacks while recovering a fumble and an interception each for touchdowns. He received a suspension for a positive marijuana test in August of that year, much to his embarrassment. He continued his 10+ sack streak in 1989 with 10.5 while forcing six fumbles, a league high. He received recognition in 1990 when he recorded 12.5 sacks and was named to his first Pro Bowl to go along with an All-Pro second-team selection. He then recorded thirteen sacks in 1991 and got a second selection for the Pro Bowl and All-Pro.

He played fourteen games in 1992 but regressed to just five sacks. In his final season with the Raiders in 1993, he recorded 7.5 sacks, with three of them coming on October 18 against the Broncos. He joined the Philadelphia Eagles in 1994 and recorded two sacks. He then retired before coming back to the Raiders for one more season in 1997, recording no sacks. Townsend recorded ten or more sacks in a season ten times in his career. His 107.5 sacks as a Raider are the most in team history, and he is the only player with 100 sacks in club history, even more than his defensive teammate Howie Long.

== Personal life ==
His son, Greg Townsend Jr., played defensive end at USC and was signed as an undrafted free agent with Oakland Raiders.

In 2012, Townsend partnered with Celebrity Publishing to release his memoir entitled "All Time."
