= Rory Graves =

American football player (born 1963)

No. 60, 66
- Position: Offensive tackle

Personal information
- Born: July 21, 1963 (age 63); Atlanta, Georgia, U.S.
- Listed height: 6 ft 6 in (1.98 m)
- Listed weight: 288 lb (131 kg)

Career information
- High school: Columbia (Decatur, Georgia)
- College: Ohio State
- NFL draft: 1986: undrafted

Career history
- Seattle Seahawks (1986); Los Angeles Raiders (1988–1991); Green Bay Packers (1993)*; Minnesota Vikings (1993)
- * Offseason or practice squad member only

Awards and highlights
- First-team All-Big Ten (1985)

Career NFL statistics
- Games played: 49
- Games started: 45
- Fumble recoveries: 1
- Stats at Pro Football Reference

Rory Anthony Graves (born July 21, 1963) is an American former professional football player who was an offensive tackle in the National Football League (NFL). He played college football for the Ohio State Buckeyes.

Graves was born in Atlanta, Georgia. He was signed by the Los Angeles Raiders as an undrafted free agent in 1988. He also played for the Minnesota Vikings.
