= Steve Wisniewski =

American football player (born 1967)

No. 76
- Position: Guard

Personal information
- Born: April 7, 1967 (age 59); Rutland, Vermont, U.S.
- Listed height: 6 ft 4 in (1.93 m)
- Listed weight: 305 lb (138 kg)

Career information
- High school: Westfield (Houston, Texas)
- College: Penn State (1985–1988)
- NFL draft: 1989: 2nd round, 29th overall pick

Career history

Playing
- Los Angeles / Oakland Raiders (1989–2001)

Coaching
- Oakland Raiders (2011) Assistant offensive line coach

Awards and highlights
- 2× First-team All-Pro (1991, 1992); 6× Second-team All-Pro (1990, 1993–1996, 2000); 8× Pro Bowl (1990–1995, 1997, 2000); NFL 1990s All-Decade Team; PFWA All-Rookie Team (1989); National champion (1986); First-team All-American (1988); First-team All-East (1987); Second-team All-East (1988)

Career NFL statistics
- Games played: 206
- Games started: 206
- Fumble recoveries: 4
- Stats at Pro Football Reference

Steve Wisniewski (born April 7, 1967), nicknamed "the Wiz", is an American former professional football player who was a guard for 13 seasons in the National Football League (NFL) with the Los Angeles / Oakland Raiders, and later served as the team's assistant offensive line coach. He played college football for the Penn State Nittany Lions, where he was named an All-American. Wisniewski was selected by the Dallas Cowboys in the second round of the 1989 NFL draft, but his playing rights were traded to the Raiders during the same draft. A tough guard in his day (particularly in blocking the run), Wisniewski was named an All-Pro (two First-team, six Second-team) eight times while missing only two games in his career.

== Early life ==
Wisniewski was a standout guard at Penn State and was a key contributor on the Nittany Lions national championship team in 1986. He capped his senior season by playing in the Hula Bowl and the Japan Bowl.

Wisniewski earned a Bachelor of Science in marketing in 1989.

== Professional career ==
Wisniewski was selected in the second round (#29 overall) of the 1989 NFL draft by the Dallas Cowboys. He was immediately traded to the Los Angeles Raiders along with a sixth round pick (#140-Jeff Francis), in exchange for a second round choice (#39-Daryl Johnston), a third round choice (#68-Rhondy Weston) and a fifth round choice (#119-Willis Crockett).

Wisniewski would play all of his 13 seasons in the league with the Raiders. "Wiz" became the standout guard of the 1990s and made the Pro Bowl eight times in his career, tying him at the time of his retirement with Art Shell, Howie Long, and Tim Brown (who would later surpass him) for most by a Raider. He was also named to the NFL 1990s All-Decade Team and was a first team All-Pro twice. He missed only two regular season starts in his 13-year career due to injury.

On January 27, 2011, it was announced that Wisniewski would be returning to the Oakland Raiders as an assistant offensive line coach under new head coach Hue Jackson, new offensive coordinator Al Saunders and new offensive line coach Bob Wylie. He was thrilled by saying "I'm back to my first love, the Oakland Raiders and working with the Offensive Line. I’m a Raider for life. I can help in technique, help in mindset and attitude and really push these young men to develop and to be the heartbeat of the team." Wisniewski said via the Raiders' website. He also said in a statement that "I’m thrilled to be working in the building again for the Silver and Black and helping to shape the future of the offensive line." He and Wylie replaced Chris Morgan and Jim Michalczik, who were not retained for the 2011 season.

Following the death of Raiders owner Al Davis in October 2011, Jackson's firing the following January and the hirings of new general manager Reggie McKenzie and new head coach Dennis Allen, Wisniewski, one of the few coaches retained by the new regime, was slated to assist under new offensive line coach Frank Pollack. However, right before the start of training camp in July 2012, it was announced that Wisniewski had resigned for "personal reasons" but would remain with the club as an ambassador.

== Personal life ==
Wisniewski lives in Austin, Texas and maintains an association with the Raiders. He spent one year at Stanford University, helping coach the offensive line on a team that reached the Orange Bowl Wisniewski is a born-again Christian and currently volunteers at The Well Christian Community Church in Dublin, California, the church founded by fellow ex-Raider, Napoleon Kaufman. In 2004, Wisniewski was inducted into the National Polish American Sports Hall of Fame.

Wisniewski's brother Leo was a three-time letterman for the Penn State football team (1979–1981). Wisniewski's nephew (Leo's son), Stefen, was a guard/center on the Penn State team and had a standout career there. The Oakland Raiders selected him 48th in the 2011 NFL draft, and on April 18, 2015, he signed with the Jacksonville Jaguars. He played with the Philadelphia Eagles and Kansas City Chiefs and started at left guard for both teams as they went on to win Super Bowl LII and Super Bowl LIV.
