= 1987 Buffalo Bills season =

28th season in franchise history

- Owner: Ralph Wilson
- General manager: Bill Polian
- Head coach: Marv Levy
- Home stadium: Rich Stadium

Results
- Record: 7–8
- Division place: 4th AFC East
- Playoffs: Did not qualify
- All-Pros: DE Bruce Smith (1st team); ST Steve Tasker (1st team); LB Shane Conlan (2nd team)
- Pro Bowlers: QB Jim Kelly; DE Bruce Smith

The 1987 Buffalo Bills season was the franchise's 18th season in the National Football League, and 28th overall.

On October 31, 1987, the Los Angeles Rams traded Eric Dickerson to the Indianapolis Colts in a three team trade involving the Bills. The Rams sent Dickerson to the Colts for six draft choices and two players. Buffalo obtained the rights to Cornelius Bennett from Indianapolis. Buffalo sent running back Greg Bell and three draft choices to the Rams, while Indianapolis added Owen Gill and three of their own draft picks to complete the deal with the Rams. Adding Bennett to the team helped to form the nucleus for a strong young defensive unit that would become the core of Buffalo's later Super Bowl teams.

== Offseason ==
=== NFL draft ===
Buffalo's first two draft picks—linebacker Shane Conlan and defensive back Nate Odomes—would later go on to make to have a great deal of impact on Buffalo's defense. Conlan was named 1987 Defensive Rookie of the Year and would be selected to three consecutive Pro Bowls in the 1988, 1989 and 1990 seasons. Odomes would be selected to consecutive Pro Bowls in 1992 and 1993.

Another impactful rookie, Cornelius Bennett, was drafted by Indianapolis in 1987, before being traded to Buffalo.

1987 Buffalo Bills draft
| Round | Pick | Player | Position | College | Notes |
| 1 | 8 | Shane Conlan * | Linebacker | Penn State | |
| 2 | 29 | Nate Odomes * | Defensive back | Wisconsin | |
| 2 | 33 | Roland Mitchell | Defensive back | Texas Tech | |
| 3 | 60 | David Brandon | Linebacker | Memphis State | |
| 3 | 78 | Jamie Mueller | Running back | Benedictine (KS) | |
| 4 | 109 | Leon Seals | Defensive end | Jackson State | |
| 7 | 171 | Kerry Porter | Running back | Washington State | |
| 11 | 283 | Howard Ballard * | Offensive Tackle | Alabama A&M | |
Made roster † Pro Football Hall of Fame * Made at least one Pro Bowl during career

== Personnel ==
=== Staff ===
1987 Buffalo Bills staff
| Front office: President – Ralph Wilson; Vice president of administration/general manager – Bill Polian; Vice president of football operations – Marv Levy; Director of college scouting – John Butler; Director of pro personnel – Bob Ferguson; National scout – Norm Pollom; College scout – A. J. Smith; Administrative assistant to the head coach – Chuck Dickerson; Head coaches: Head coach – Marv Levy; Offensive coaches: Offensive coordinator/offensive line – Jim Ringo; Quarterbacks/Passing Game Coordinator – Ted Marchibroda; Running backs – Elijah Pitts; Receivers – Ted Tollner; Tight ends – Chuck Dickerson | Defensive coaches: Defensive coordinator/linebackers – Walt Corey; Defensive line – Ted Cottrell; Defensive backs – Dick Roach; Defensive assistant – Chuck Lester; Special teams coaches: Special teams – Bruce DeHaven; Strength and conditioning: Strength and conditioning coordinator – Rusty Jones |

=== NFL replacement players ===
After the league decided to use replacement players during the NFLPA strike, the following team was assembled:

1987 Buffalo Bills replacement roster
| Quarterbacks: 13 Brian McClure; 10 Mark Miller; 17 Willie Totten; Running backs: 46 Joe Chetti; 23 Barry Chubb; 30 Warren Loving; 47 Mike Panepinto; 24 Johnny Shepherd; 26 Leonard Williams; Wide receivers: 86 Marc Brown; 88 Reggie Bynum; 83 Sheldon Gaines; 85 Kris Haines; 89 Thad McFadden; Tight ends: 84 Veno Belk; 87 Mark Walczak | Offensive linemen: 68 Tony Brown T; 79 Glen Campbell; 71 Sean Dowling; 75 Erik Rosenmeier C; 63 Rick Schulte T; 64 Joe Silipo; 62 Don Sommer; Defensive linemen: 41 Ira Albright DT/FB; 91 Jack Bravyak; 90 Arnold Campbell DE; 93 Scott Hernandez; 74 Joe McGrail; 74 Richard Tharpe; 94 Billy Witt DE | Linebackers: 92 Will Cokeley; 50 Bob LeBlanc; 52 Scott Schankweiler; 96 Craig Walls; 53 Scott Watters; 60 Al Wenglikowski; Defensive backs: 20 John Armstrong; 21 Gerald Bess; 25 Bill Callahan; 36 Steve Clark; 39 Larry Friday; 27 John Lewis; 40 Chip Nuzzo; 23 Kerry Parker; 9 David Martin; Special teams: 5 Rick Partridge P; 3 Todd Schlopy K |

=== Roster ===
1987 Buffalo Bills roster
| Quarterbacks (QB): 12 Jim Kelly; 14 Frank Reich; Running backs (RB): 35 Carl Byrum; 33 Ronnie Harmon; 41 Jamie Mueller; 30 Kerry Porter; 26 Ricky Porter; 24 Lionel Vital; Wide receivers (WR): 81 Walter Broughton; 85 Chris Burkett; 86 Trumaine Johnson; 83 Andre Reed; 89 Steve Tasker; Tight ends (TE): 88 Pete Metzelaars; 84 Keith McKeller; 87 Butch Rolle | Offensive linemen (OL): 61 Leonard Burton T; 70 Joe Devlin T; 59 Mitch Frerotte G; 67 Kent Hull C; 51 Jim Ritcher G; 62 Mark Traynowicz G/C; 65 Tim Vogler G; 73 Will Wolford T; Defensive linemen (DL): 95 Sean McNanie DE; 74 Bruce Mesner NT; 79 Dean Prater DE; 96 Leon Seals DE; 76 Fred Smerlas NT; 78 Bruce Smith DE | Linebackers (LB): 55 Cornelius Bennett OLB; 50 Ray Bentley ILB; 58 Shane Conlan ILB; 53 Tony Furjanic ILB; 52 John Kaiser OLB; 97 Scott Radecic ILB; 56 Darryl Talley OLB; Defensive backs (DB): 29 Derrick Burroughs CB; 21 Wayne Davis CB; 45 Dwight Drane SS; 47 Kirby Jackson CB; 38 Mark Kelso FS; 25 Roland Mitchell CB; 37 Nate Odomes CB; 27 Ron Pitts SS; 42 Durwood Roquemore FS; Special teams (ST): 2 Willie Beecher K; 4 John Kidd P; 63 Adam Lingner LS; 11 Scott Norwood K | Reserve: 68 Tony Brown T (IR); 80 Jerry Butler WR (IR); -- Reggie Bynum WR (IR); -- Roger Caron T (DNR); -- Chas Fox WR (IR); 99 Hal Garner LB (IR); 8 Stan Gelbaugh QB (IR); 75 Mike Hamby DE (IR); 92 Steve Hammond LB (IR); 71 Dale Hellestrae T (IR); 20 Flip Johnson WR (IR); -- Joe Howard WR (IR); 48 Lawrence Johnson S (IR); 54 Eugene Marve LB (IR); 13 Brian McClure QB (IR); 94 Mark Pike DE (IR); 40 Robb Riddick RB (IR); -- Clint Sampson WR (IR); Rookies in italics |

== Regular season ==
Cornerback Nate Odomes was the youngest starting defensive player in the NFL. It was also his rookie season.

=== Schedule ===
| Week | Date | Opponent | Result | Record | Venue | Attendance |
|---|---|---|---|---|---|---|
| 1 | September 13 | **New York Jets** | **L** 28–31 | 0–1 | Rich Stadium | 76,718 |
| 2 | September 20 | Houston Oilers | **W** 34–30 | 1–1 | Rich Stadium | 56,534 |
| – | September 27 | at Dallas Cowboys | canceled | | | |
| 3 | October 4 | **Indianapolis Colts** | **L** 6–47 | 1–2 | Rich Stadium | 9,860 |
| 4 | October 11 | at **New England Patriots** | **L** 7–14 | 1–3 | Sullivan Stadium | 11,878 |
| 5 | October 18 | New York Giants | **W** 6–3 | 2–3 | Rich Stadium | 15,737 |
| 6 | October 25 | at **Miami Dolphins** | **W** 34–31 (OT) | 3–3 | Miami Orange Bowl | 61,295 |
| 7 | November 1 | Washington Redskins | **L** 7–27 | 3–4 | Rich Stadium | 71,640 |
| 8 | November 8 | Denver Broncos | **W** 21–14 | 4–4 | Rich Stadium | 63,698 |
| 9 | November 15 | at Cleveland Browns | **L** 21–27 | 4–5 | Cleveland Municipal Stadium | 78,409 |
| 10 | November 22 | at **New York Jets** | **W** 17–14 | 5–5 | Giants Stadium | 58,407 |
| 11 | November 29 | **Miami Dolphins** | **W** 27–0 | 6–5 | Rich Stadium | 68,055 |
| 12 | December 6 | at Los Angeles Raiders | **L** 21–34 | 6–6 | Los Angeles Memorial Coliseum | 43,143 |
| 13 | December 13 | at **Indianapolis Colts** | **W** 27–3 | 7–6 | Hoosier Dome | 60,253 |
| 14 | December 20 | **New England Patriots** | **L** 7–13 | 7–7 | Rich Stadium | 74,945 |
| 15 | December 27 | at Philadelphia Eagles | **L** 17–7 | 7–8 | Veterans Stadium | 57,547 |
Note: Intra-division opponents are in bold text.

=== Game summaries ===
==== Week 2 ====
| Team | 1 | 2 | 3 | 4 | Total |
|---|---|---|---|---|---|
| Oilers | 3 | 14 | 3 | 10 | 30 |
| • Bills | 3 | 10 | 0 | 21 | 34 |

- Date: September 20
- Location: Rich Stadium, Orchard Park, New York
- Game start: 1:00 p.m. EST
- Game weather: 62 °F (16.7 °C); wind 8 miles per hour (13 km/h; 7.0 kn)
- TV announcers (NBC): Don Criqui and Bob Trumpy

Scoring summary
| 1 | BUF | Scott Norwood 45 yard field goal | Bills 3–0 |
| 1 | HOU | Tony Zendejas 52 yard field goal | Tie 3–3 |
| 2 | HOU | Drew Hill 2 yard pass from Warren Moon (Tony Zendejas kick) | Oilers 10–3 |
| 2 | BUF | Scott Norwood 38 yard field goal | Oilers 10–6 |
| 2 | HOU | Mike Rozier 8 yard run (Tony Zendejas kick) | Oilers 17–6 |
| 2 | BUF | Robb Riddick 11 yard pass from Jim Kelly (Scott Norwood kick) | Oilers 17–13 |
| 3 | HOU | Tony Zendejas 27 yard field goal | Oilers 20–13 |
| 4 | BUF | Andre Reed 8 yard pass from Jim Kelly (Scott Norwood kick) | Tie 20–20 |
| 4 | HOU | Ernest Givens 12 yard pass from Warren Moon (Tony Zendejas kick) | Oilers 27–20 |
| 4 | HOU | Tony Zendejas 30 yard field goal | Oilers 30–20 |
| 4 | BUF | Robb Riddick 2 yard run (Scott Norwood kick) | Oilers 30–27 |
| 4 | BUF | Ronnie Harmon 2 yard pass from Jim Kelly (Scott Norwood kick) | Bills 34–30 |

==== Week 6 ====
Buffalo Bills (2–3) at Miami Dolphins (2–3)

| Team | 1 | 2 | 3 | 4 | OT | Total |
|---|---|---|---|---|---|---|
| • Bills | 0 | 3 | 14 | 14 | 3 | 34 |
| Dolphins | 14 | 7 | 0 | 10 | 0 | 31 |

- Date: October 25, 1987
- Location: Joe Robbie Stadium
- Game start: 1:00 p.m. EST
- Game attendance: 61,295
- Game weather: 78 °F (25.6 °C); wind 10 miles per hour (16 km/h; 8.7 kn)
- Referee: Pat Haggerty
- TV announcers (NBC): Jim Donovan and Paul Maguire

==== Week 7 ====
Washington Redskins (5–1) at Buffalo Bills (3–3)

| Team | 1 | 2 | 3 | 4 | Total |
|---|---|---|---|---|---|
| • Redskins | 3 | 14 | 10 | 0 | 27 |
| Bills | 0 | 0 | 0 | 7 | 7 |

- Date: November 1, 1987
- Location: Rich Stadium, Orchard Park, New York
- Game start: 1:00 p.m. EST
- Game attendance: 71,640
- Game weather: 52 °F (11.1 °C); wind 7 miles per hour (11 km/h; 6.1 kn)
- Referee: Jerry Markbreit
- TV announcers (CBS): Dick Stockton and Terry Bradshaw

==== Week 8 ====
Week Eight: Denver Broncos (4–2–1) at Buffalo Bills (3–4)

| Quarter | 1 | 2 | 3 | 4 | Total |
|---|---|---|---|---|---|
| Broncos | 0 | 0 | 7 | 7 | **14** |
| **Bills** | 0 | 18 | 3 | 0 | **21** |

at Rich Stadium, Orchard Park, New York

- Date: November 8, 1987
- Game time: 1:00 p.m. EST
- Game weather: 50 °F or 10 °C; wind 17 miles per hour (27 km/h; 15 kn)
- Game attendance: 63,698
- Referee: Dick Jorgensen
- TV announcers (NBC): Gary Gerould and Reggie Rucker

Game information

**First quarter**

- No scoring

**Second quarter**

- BUF – Andre Reed 9 yard pass from Jim Kelly (Scott Norwood kick). Bills 7–0
- BUF – Safety, Robb Riddick blocked punt through end zone. Bills 9–0
- BUF – Robb Riddick 1 yard rush (Scott Norwood kick). Bills 16–0
- BUF – Safety, Steve Tasker blocked punt through end zone. Bills 18–0

**Third quarter**

- BUF – Scott Norwood 30-yard field goal. Bills 21–0.
- DEN – Sammy Winder 6 yard rush (Rich Karlis kick). Bills 21–7.

**Fourth quarter**

- DEN – Vance Johnson 15 yard pass from John Elway (Rich Karlis kick). Bills 21–14.

Top passers

- DEN – John Elway – 13/30, 163 yards, 1 INT, 1 TD
- BUF – Jim Kelly – 14/23, 135 yards, 1 INT, 1 TD

Top rushers

- DEN – Sammy Winder – 12 rushes, 40 yards, 1 TD
- BUF – Robb Riddick – 19 rushes, 78 yards, 1 TD

Top receivers

- DEN – Vance Johnson – 5 receptions, 95 yards, 1 TD
- BUF – Andre Reed – 5 receptions, 60 yards, 1 TD

- Cornelius Bennett’s first game as a Buffalo Bill, wearing #55.
- Steve Tasker blocked punt just before halftime resulting in a safety and 18–0 halftime score.

==== Week 9 ====
| Team | 1 | 2 | 3 | 4 | Total |
|---|---|---|---|---|---|
| Bills | 7 | 0 | 0 | 14 | 21 |
| • Browns | 3 | 14 | 7 | 3 | 27 |

- Date: November 15
- Location: Cleveland Municipal Stadium
- Game start: 1:00 PM EST
- Game attendance: 78,409
- Game weather: 48 °F or 8.9 °C; wind 7 miles per hour (11 km/h; 6.1 kn)
- Referee: Gene Barth
- TV announcers (NBC): Tom Hammond and Michael Jackson

==== Week 11 vs Dolphins ====
Week Twelve: Miami Dolphins (5–5) at Buffalo Bills (5–5)

| Quarter | 1 | 2 | 3 | 4 | Total |
|---|---|---|---|---|---|
| Dolphins | 0 | 0 | 0 | 0 | **0** |
| **Bills** | 0 | 21 | 3 | 3 | **27** |

at Rich Stadium, Orchard Park, New York

- Date: November 29
- Game time: 1:00 p.m. EST
- Game weather: 48 °F or 8.9 °C
- Game attendance: 68,055
- Referee: Red Cashion
- TV announcers (NBC): Don Criqui and Bob Trumpy
- Box Score, Box Score

Game information

**First quarter**

- No scoring

**Second quarter**

- BUF – Jamie Mueller 5-yard run (Scott Norwood kick), 14:51. Bills 7–0.
- BUF – Butch Rolle 3-yard pass from Jim Kelly (Scott Norwood kick), 5:58. Bills 14–0.
- BUF – Chris Burkett 22-yard pass from Jim Kelly (Scott Norwood kick), 1:02. Bills 21–0.

**Third quarter**

- BUF – Scott Norwood 39-yard field goal, 10:01. Bills 24–0.

**Fourth quarter**

- BUF – Scott Norwood 28-yard field goal, 7:52. Bils 27–0.

Top passers

- MIA – Dan Marino – 13/28, 165 yards, 3 INT
- BUF – Jim Kelly – 15/21, 217 yards, 2 TD

Top rushers

- MIA – Troy Stradford – 15 rushes, 23 yards
- BUF – Ronnie Harmon – 23 rushes, 119 yards

Top receivers

- MIA – Ron Davenport – 3 receptions, 41 yards
- BUF – Andre Reed – 4 receptions, 96 yards

==== Week 12 ====
| Team | 1 | 2 | 3 | 4 | Total |
|---|---|---|---|---|---|
| Bills | 0 | 14 | 7 | 0 | 21 |
| • Raiders | 10 | 3 | 14 | 7 | 34 |

- Date: December 6, 1987
- Location: Los Angeles Memorial Coliseum, Los Angeles, California
- Elapsed time: EST
- Game weather: 48 °F or 8.9 °C; wind 7 miles per hour (11 km/h; 6.1 kn)
- Referee: Ben Dreith
- TV announcers (NBC): Gary Gerould and Dave Casper

==== Week 15 ====
Buffalo Bills (7–7) at Philadelphia Eagles (6–8)

| Team | 1 | 2 | 3 | 4 | Total |
|---|---|---|---|---|---|
| Bills | 0 | 0 | 0 | 7 | 7 |
| • Eagles | 0 | 10 | 7 | 0 | 17 |

- Date: December 27, 1987
- Location: Veterans Stadium Philadelphia, PA
- Game start: 1:00 EST
- Game weather: 35 °F (1.7 °C); wind 10 miles per hour (16 km/h; 8.7 kn)
- TV announcers (NBC): Tom Hammond

=== Standings ===
AFC East
| | W | L | T | PCT | DIV | CONF | PF | PA | STK |
|---|---|---|---|---|---|---|---|---|---|
| ^{(3)} Indianapolis Colts | 9 | 6 | 0 | .600 | 5–3 | 8–6 | 300 | 238 | W2 |
| New England Patriots | 8 | 7 | 0 | .533 | 6–2 | 8–4 | 320 | 293 | W3 |
| Miami Dolphins | 8 | 7 | 0 | .533 | 2–6 | 5–7 | 362 | 335 | L1 |
| Buffalo Bills | 7 | 8 | 0 | .467 | 4–4 | 6–6 | 270 | 305 | L2 |
| New York Jets | 6 | 9 | 0 | .400 | 3–5 | 6–5 | 334 | 360 | L4 |

== Player stats ==
=== Passing ===
Note: Comp = Completions; ATT = Attempts; TD = Touchdowns; INT = Interceptions

| Player | Games | Comp | Att | Yards | TD | INT | Rating |
|---|---|---|---|---|---|---|---|
| Jim Kelly | 12 | 250 | 419 | 2798 | 19 | 11 | 83.8 |
| John Kidd | 12 | 0 | 1 | 0 | 0 | 0 | 39.6 |
| Dan Manucci | 3 | 7 | 21 | 68 | 0 | 2 | 3.8 |
| Brian McClure | 1 | 20 | 38 | 181 | 0 | 3 | 32.9 |
| Mark Miller | 1 | 1 | 3 | 9 | 0 | 1 | 2.8 |
| Robb Riddick | 6 | 1 | 1 | 35 | 0 | 0 | 118.7 |
| Willie Totten | 2 | 13 | 33 | 155 | 2 | 2 | 49.4 |

=== Rushing ===
| Player | Games | Attempts | Yards | Avg | TD |
|---|---|---|---|---|---|
| Ronnie Harmon | 12 | 116 | 485 | | 2 |
| Jamie Mueller | 12 | 82 | 354 | | 2 |
| Carl Byrum | 13 | 66 | 280 | | 0 |
| Robb Riddick | 6 | 59 | 221 | | 5 |
| Ricky Porter | 9 | 47 | 177 | | 0 |
| Jim Kelly | 12 | 29 | 133 | | 0 |

=== Receiving ===
| Player | Games | Number | Yards | Avg | TD |
|---|---|---|---|---|---|
| Chris Burkett | 12 | 56 | 765 | 13.7 | 4 |
| Andre Reed | 12 | 57 | 752 | 13.2 | 5 |
| Ronnie Harmon | 12 | 56 | 477 | 8.5 | 2 |
| Pete Metzelaars | 12 | 28 | 290 | 10.4 | 0 |
| Trumaine Johnson | 12 | 15 | 186 | 12.4 | 2 |

=== Defense ===
Note: FR = Fumble Recoveries; TCKL = Tackles; INT = Interceptions; TD = Touchdowns

| Player | Games | Sacks | Forced Fumbles | FR | Tckl | INT | Yards | TD |
|---|---|---|---|---|---|---|---|---|
| Shane Conlan | 12 | 0.5 | 1 | 0 | 114 | 0 | 0 | 0 |
| Bruce Smith | 12 | 12.0 | 3 | 0 | 2 | 0 | 0 | 0 |

=== Special teams ===
Note: FGA = Field Goals Attempted; FGM = Field Goals Made; FG% = Field goal percentage; XPA = Extra Points Attempted; XPM = Extra Points Made; XP% = Extra points percentage

| Player | Games | FGA | FGM | FG % | XPA | XPM | XP % |
|---|---|---|---|---|---|---|---|
| Scott Norwood | 12 | 15 | 10 | 66.7 | 31 | 31 | 100 |
| Todd Schlopy | 3 | 5 | 2 | 40 | 2 | 1 | 50 |

==== Punting ====
| Player | Games | Punts | Yards | Long | Blocked | Avg. yards |
|---|---|---|---|---|---|---|
| John Kidd | 12 | 64 | 2495 | 67 | 0 | 39.0 |
| Rick Partridge | 3 | 18 | 678 | 52 | 1 | 37.7 |

== Awards and honors ==
Defensive Rookie of the Year

- Shane Conlan

Pro Bowl Most Valuable Player

- Bruce Smith
