= 1989 Buffalo Bills season =

30th season in franchise history, nicknamed the "Bickering Bills"

- Owner: Ralph Wilson
- General manager: Bill Polian
- Head coach: Marv Levy
- Offensive coordinator: Ted Marchibroda
- Defensive coordinator: Walt Corey
- Home stadium: Rich Stadium

Results
- Record: 9–7
- Division place: 1st AFC East
- Playoffs: Lost Divisional Playoffs (at Browns) 30–34
- Pro Bowlers: RB Thurman Thomas; WR Andre Reed; C Kent Hull; DE Bruce Smith; ILB Shane Conlan

The 1989 Buffalo Bills season was the franchise's 30th overall season as a football team and the 20th in the National Football League (NFL). The Bills finished in first place in the AFC East and finished the NFL's 1989 season with a record of 9 wins and 7 losses. Although Buffalo won the division and qualified for the postseason, their record was a drop off from their 12–4 mark in 1988, and they were defeated by the Cleveland Browns in the Divisional Round.

== Bickering Bills ==
The team was nicknamed the Bickering Bills because of a rash of internal conflicts within the team. During a Monday Night loss to the Denver Broncos, star quarterback Jim Kelly could be seen arguing with wide receiver Chris Burkett, which led to the latter's last game with the team, as he was released shortly after the game.

Kelly was injured in a Week 5 blowout loss to the Indianapolis Colts and subsequently blamed his offensive line's blocking, notably offensive tackle Howard Ballard, for contributing to his injury.

In the week leading up to a Week 8 matchup with Miami, assistant coaches Tom Bresnahan and Nick Nicolau got into a fistfight while the two were reviewing game film.

The biggest blowup occurred when starting running back Thurman Thomas, asking to address Jim Kelly's criticism of the offense, and the pass-catching ability of running back Ronnie Harmon in particular, criticized Kelly himself on a Rochester, New York television show. When asked what position the Bills could upgrade at, Thomas replied, "Quarterback." Thomas claimed at first that it was a joke, but later, when appearing on Paul Maguire's Budweiser Sportsline show, he stated that the team didn't appreciate Kelly's public criticism and that Kelly should elevate his level of play.

== Offseason ==
=== NFL draft ===
Unable to select a first or second-round pick in the 1989 draft, the Bills were able to pick wide receiver Don Beebe. Beebe was a third-round pick from small Chadron State. He would be a productive wide receiver for the team for six seasons. Beebe would achieve something akin to folk hero status in Buffalo, when, in Super Bowl XXVII, as the Bills were being soundly defeated by Dallas, Beebe chased down Cowboys defensive tackle Leon Lett, stripped the ball from his hands and saved what would have been a sure touchdown.

The Bills also drafted future two-sport athlete Brian Jordan in the seventh round. Though the Bills cut him before the 1989 season began, Jordan would go on to play three productive seasons for the Atlanta Falcons, and fifteen seasons as a Major League Baseball outfielder.

1989 Buffalo Bills draft
Round	Pick	Player	Position	College	Notes
3	82	Don Beebe	Wide receiver	Chadron State	
4	109	John Kolesar	Wide receiver	Michigan	
5	137	Michael Andrews	Defensive back	Alcorn State	
6	164	Sean Doctor	Running back	Marshall	
7	173	Brian Jordan	Cornerback	Richmond	
7	193	Chris Hale	Cornerback	USC	
9	249	Pat Rabold	Defensive tackle	Wyoming	
10	276	Carlo Cheattom	Safety, Cornerback	Auburn	
11	305	Richard Harvey	Linebacker	Tulane	
12	332	Derrell Marshall	Offensive tackle	USC	
Made roster

=== Supplemental draft ===
1989 Buffalo Bills draft
Round	Pick	Player	Position	College	Notes
8	4	Brett Young	Defensive back	Oregon	
Made roster

=== Undrafted free agents ===
1989 undrafted free agents of note
Player	Position	College
Louie Aguiar	Punter	Utah State
Charlie Baumann	Kicker	West Virginia
Tom Doctor	Linebacker	Canisius
Matt Jaworski	Linebacker	Colgate
Gerald Mack	Cornerback	North Carolina Central
Tracy Sandres	Cornerback	Florida State

== Personnel ==
=== Staff ===
1989 Buffalo Bills staff
Front office: President – Ralph Wilson; Vice-president of administration/general manager – Bill Polian; Vice-president of football operations – Marv Levy; Assistant general manager/director of pro personnel – Bob Ferguson; Director of player personnel – John Butler; Assistant director/collegiate scouting – A. J. Smith; National scout – Norm Pollom; Administrative assistant to the head coach – Chuck Dickerson; Head coaches: Head coach – Marv Levy; Offensive coaches: Offensive coordinator – Ted Marchibroda; Running backs – Elijah Pitts; Receivers – Nick Nicolau; Tight ends – Chuck Dickerson; Offensive line – Tom Bresnahan	Defensive coaches: Defensive coordinator/linebackers – Walt Corey; Defensive line – Ted Cottrell; Defensive backs – Dick Roach; Defensive Assistant/linebackers – Chuck Lester; Special teams coaches: Special teams – Bruce DeHaven; Strength and conditioning: Strength and Conditioning Coordinator – Rusty Jones

=== Roster ===
1989 Buffalo Bills roster
Quarterbacks (QB): 12 Jim Kelly; 14 Frank Reich; Running backs (RB): 23 Kenneth Davis; 33 Ronnie Harmon KR; 28 Larry Kinnebrew FB; 39 Jamie Mueller FB; 34 Thurman Thomas; Wide receivers (WR): 82 Don Beebe KR; 80 Flip Johnson; 86 James Lofton; 83 Andre Reed; 89 Steve Tasker; Tight ends (TE): 84 Keith McKeller; 88 Pete Metzelaars; 87 Butch Rolle	Offensive linemen (OL): 75 Howard Ballard T; 61 Leonard Burton T; 65 John Davis G; 70 Joe Devlin G; 67 Kent Hull C; 63 Adam Lingner C; 51 Jim Ritcher G; 69 Will Wolford T; Defensive linemen (DL): 94 Mark Pike DE; 96 Leon Seals DE; 76 Fred Smerlas NT; 78 Bruce Smith DE; 72 Art Still DE; 91 Jeff Wright NT	Linebackers (LB): 54 Carlton Bailey ILB; 55 Cornelius Bennett OLB; 50 Ray Bentley ILB; 90 Tim Cofield OLB; 58 Shane Conlan ILB; 57 Matt Monger OLB; 97 Scott Radecic ILB; 56 Darryl Talley OLB; Defensive backs (DB): 45 Dwight Drane SS; 22 John Hagy FS; 26 Chris Hale CB; 47 Kirby Jackson CB; 38 Mark Kelso FS; 37 Nate Odomes CB; 46 Leonard Smith SS; 20 Mickey Sutton CB/PR; Special teams (ST): 4 John Kidd P; 11 Scott Norwood K	Practice squad: 68 Tony Brown T; 81 Deval Glover WR; 92 Matt Jaworski LB; 93 Wes Pritchett LB; Reserve: 29 Derrick Burroughs CB (IR); 60 Tom Doctor LB (IR); 24 Darryl Franklin WR (PUP); 59 Mitch Frerotte G (IR); 7 Gale Gilbert QB (IR); 95 Richard Harvey LB (IR); 36 John Kolesar WR (IR); 74 Bruce Mesner NT (IR); -- Carl Mims CB (IR); 40 Robb Riddick RB (IR); 16 Tracy Sanders CB (IR); 65 Tim Vogler G/C (PUP); 47 active, 12 inactive, 4 practice squad Rookies in italics

== Regular season ==
Before the season, future Hall of Fame defensive end Bruce Smith was offered a large contract by Denver (US$7.5 million over five years), one that the Bills chose to match to retain Smith. In 1989, Smith became the Bills' all-time sack leader when he reached his 52nd sack; he would end his 19-year career with 200, the most of any NFL player all-time.

Despite the internal strife the Bills experienced, they had some memorable wins. The Bills started the season with a last-second victory at Miami. The Dolphins led 24–13 in the fourth but Buffalo scored on a Flip Johnson touchdown catch, then with two seconds left on the clock, quarterback Jim Kelly dropped back to pass, but ran the ball in to the end zone as time expired, securing a 27–24 win.

In Week Three, the Bills traveled to the Houston Astrodome and faced the "Run, and Shoot" Oilers. The Bills raced to a 27–10 lead in the third, but the Oilers exploded and the two teams combined for 45 points to force overtime. In overtime, a missed Tony Zendejas kick allowed the Bills to win on Jim Kelly's 28-yard score to Andre Reed. The 47–41 win would become the highest-scoring game between the two franchises. Kelly finished with five touchdown throws.

In Week Six the Bills hosted the undefeated Los Angeles Rams, with backup quarterback Frank Reich subbing for an injured Jim Kelly. The two clubs combined for 26 fourth-quarter points, and with 77 seconds remaining Reich started a drive from the Buffalo 36 yard line and with sixteen seconds left Andre Reed caught the winning eight-yard touchdown.

In Week Thirteen, on Monday Night Football, the Bills lost to the Seattle Seahawks 17–16, which included Seahawk Steve Largent running in a botched extra-point attempt. Dave Krieg's 51-yard touchdown in the fourth was ultimately the 1-point difference.

The Bills then lost their next two games (to the Saints and 49ers) before securing the AFC East title with a shutout road win over the New York Jets.

=== Schedule ===
Week	Date	Opponent	Result	Record	Venue	Attendance
1	September 10	at **Miami Dolphins**	**W** 27–24	1–0	Joe Robbie Stadium	54,541
2	September 18	Denver Broncos	**L** 14–28	1–1	Rich Stadium	78,176
3	September 24	at Houston Oilers	**W** 47–41 (OT)	2–1	Houston Astrodome	57,278
4	October 1	**New England Patriots**	**W** 31–10	3–1	Rich Stadium	78,921
5	October 8	at **Indianapolis Colts**	**L** 14–37	3–2	Hoosier Dome	58,890
6	October 16	Los Angeles Rams	**W** 23–20	4–2	Rich Stadium	76,231
7	October 22	**New York Jets**	**W** 34–3	5–2	Rich Stadium	76,811
8	October 29	**Miami Dolphins**	**W** 31–17	6–2	Rich Stadium	80,208
9	November 5	at Atlanta Falcons	**L** 28–30	6–3	Atlanta–Fulton County Stadium	45,267
10	November 12	**Indianapolis Colts**	**W** 30–7	7–3	Rich Stadium	79,256
11	November 19	at **New England Patriots**	**L** 24–33	7–4	Sullivan Stadium	49,663
12	November 26	Cincinnati Bengals	**W** 24–7	8–4	Rich Stadium	80,074
13	December 4	at Seattle Seahawks	**L** 16–17	8–5	Kingdome	57,682
14	December 10	New Orleans Saints	**L** 19–22	8–6	Rich Stadium	70,037
15	December 17	at San Francisco 49ers	**L** 10–21	8–7	Candlestick Park	60,927
16	December 23	at **New York Jets**	**W** 37–0	9–7	Giants Stadium	21,148
Note: Intra-division opponents are in **bold** text.

=== Game summaries ===
==== Week 1 ====
Week One: Buffalo Bills (0–0) at Miami Dolphins (0–0)

Quarter	1	2	3	4	Total
**Bills**	3	0	10	14	**27**
Dolphins	0	10	7	7	**24**

at Joe Robbie Stadium, Miami, Florida

- Date: September 10, 1989
- Game time: 4:00 p.m. EST
- Game weather: 83 °F or 28.3 °C
- Game attendance: 54,541
- Referee: Jerry Markbreit
- TV announcers (NBC): Jim Donovan and Jimmy Cefalo
- Pro-Football-Reference.com, The Football Database

Game information

**First quarter**

- BUF – Scott Norwood 34 yard field goal, 2:34. Bills 3–0. Drive:

**Second quarter**

- MIA – Troy Stradford 1-yard run (Pete Stoyanovich kick), 8:48. Dolphins 7–3. Drive:
- MIA – Pete Stoyanovich 29-yard field goal, 0:03. Dolphins 10–3. Drive:

**Third quarter**

- BUF – Larry Kinnebrew 2-yard run (Scott Norwood kick), 11:58. Tie 10–10. Drive:
- MIA – Marc Logan 2-yard blocked punt return (Pete Stoyanovich kick), 7:03. Dolphins 17–10. Drive:
- BUF – Scott Norwood 37-yard field goal, 2:11. Dolphins 17–13. Drive:

**Fourth quarter**

- MIA – Andre Brown 8-yard pass from Dan Marino (Pete Stoyanovich kick), 4:17. Dolphins 24–13. Drive:
- BUF – Flip Johnson 26-yard pass from Jim Kelly (Scott Norwood kick), 2:50. Dolphins 24–20. Drive:
- BUF – Jim Kelly 2-yard run (Scott Norwood kick), 0:00. Bills 27–24. **Drive: 51 yards.**

Top passers

- BUF – Jim Kelly – 25/40, 265 yards, TD
- MIA – Dan Marino – 25/38, 255 yards, TD, 2 INT

Top rushers

- BUF – Thurman Thomas – 13 rushes, 94 yards
- MIA – Troy Stradford – 12 rushes, 43 yards, TD

Top receivers

- BUF – Thurman Thomas – 8 receptions, 65 yards
- MIA – Ferrell Edmunds – 5 receptions, 58 yards

==== Week 2 ====
Denver Broncos (1-0) at Buffalo Bills (1-0)

Team	1	2	3	4	Total
• Broncos	5	13	3	7	28
Bills	0	0	7	7	14

- Date: September 18, 1989
- Location: Rich Stadium, Orchard Park, NY
- Game start: 9:00 PM EST
- Game attendance: 78,176
- Game weather: 57 °F or 13.9 °C; wind 6 miles per hour (9.7 km/h; 5.2 kn)
- Referee: Bob McElwee
- TV announcers (ABC Monday Night Football): Al Michaels, Frank Gifford, and Dan Dierdorf

The Bills lost on Monday Night Football 28–14, giving up a safety when Jamie Mueller was downed in the Bills endzone in the first quarter. It never got better as Jim Kelly was intercepted three times by the Broncos. John Elway and four Broncos backs rushed for 201 yards and won despite ten penalties for 71 yards. Kelly got into a confrontation with receiver Chris Burkett. In the game, Burkett had only one catch for six yards; Burkett was cut and quickly signed by the Jets.

==== Week 3 ====
Buffalo Bills (1-1) at Houston Oilers (1-1)

Team	1	2	3	4	OT	Total
• Bills	10	10	7	14	6	47
Oilers	7	3	14	17	0	41

- Date: September 24
- Location: Astrodome Houston, TX
- Game start: 1:00 PM EST
- Game attendance: 57,278
- Game weather: Dome
- Referee: Jerry Seeman
- TV announcers (NBC): Marv Albert and Bob Trumpy

The Bills traveled to the Astrodome and the ensuing game against the Oilers became the highest-scoring meeting in the two clubs' history. With Buffalo up 13–10 on the final play of the second quarter a blocked Oilers field goal attempt was run back for a 76-yard Bills touchdown by Mark Kelso. The Bills clawed to a 27–10 lead but the Oilers scored two quick touchdowns in the third, the second a Cris Dishman score on a blocked punt. Warren Moon was drilled as he rifled a touchdown to Ernest Givens and Givens literally jumped over three Bills defenders as he landed in the endzone; a Kelly interception led to a Lorenzo White score, but after a Thurman Thomas touchdown and the overturning of a Bills pick-six, Moon drove down for Tony Zendejas's game-tying 52-yard field goal. Zendejas missed another kick in overtime, and Kelly's 28-yard strike to Andre Reed ended the game, a 47–41 overtime Bills win.

==== Week 4: vs. New England Patriots ====
Week 4: New England Patriots at Buffalo Bills

Quarter	1	2	3	4	Total
Patriots	3	0	7	0	**10**
**Bills**	7	17	0	7	**31**

at Rich Stadium, Orchard Park, NY

- Date: October 1, 1989
- Game time: 1:00 p.m. EST
- Game weather: Overcast, 60 °F (16 °C)
- TV announcers (NBC): Charlie Jones and Merlin Olsen

Game information

**First quarter**

**Second quarter**

**Third quarter**

**Fourth quarter**

Top passers

- NE – Doug Flutie – 15/41, 176 yards, TD, INT
- BUF – Jim Kelly – 12/17, 278 yards, 3 TD

Top rushers

- NE – Bob Perryman – 15 rushes, 68 yards
- BUF – Thurman Thomas – 21 rushes, 105 yards, TD

Top receivers

- NE – Cedric Jones – 4 receptions, 48 yards, TD
- BUF – Andre Reed – 4 receptions, 114 yards

==== Week 6 ====
Team	1	2	3	4	Total
Rams	7	0	3	10	20
• Bills	0	6	0	17	23

- Date: October 16
- Location: Rich Stadium, Orchard Park, New York
- Game start: 9:00 p.m. EST
- Game weather: 66 °F or 18.9 °C; wind 16 mph (26 km/h)
- Referee: Dick Jorgensen
- TV announcers (ABC): Frank Gifford and Dan Dierdorf

Scoring summary
Q1	LA	Buford McGee 3 yard pass from Jim Everett (Mike Lansford kick)	LA 7–0
Q2	BUF	Scott Norwood 38 yard field goal	LA 7–3
Q2	BUF	Scott Norwood 47 yard field goal	LA 7–6
Q3	LA	Mike Lansford 34 yard field goal	LA 10–6
Q4	BUF	Scott Norwood 40 yard field goal	LA 10–9
Q4	LA	Mike Lansford 36 yard field goal	LA 13–9
Q4	BUF	Thurman Thomas 1 yard pass from Frank Reich (Scott Norwood kick)	BUF 16–13
Q4	LA	Flipper Anderson 78 yard pass from Jim Everett (Mike Lansford kick)	LA 20–16
Q4	BUF	Andre Reed 8 yard pass from Frank Reich (Scott Norwood kick)	BUF 23–20

==== Week 8 ====
Miami Dolphins at Buffalo Bills

Team	1	2	3	4	Total
Dolphins	3	0	7	7	17
• Bills	0	21	0	10	31

- Date: Sunday October 29, 1989
- Location: Rich Stadium - Orchard Park, New York
- Game start: 1:00pm EST
- Game attendance: 80,208
- Game weather: 57 °F (13.9 °C); wind 6 miles per hour (9.7 km/h; 5.2 kn)
- Referee: Johnny Grier
- TV announcers (NFL on NBC): Don Criqui and Ahmad Rashad

This game would set a Bill's record for the highest attendance at Rich Stadium for a Bill's game to date.

==== Week 9 ====
Buffalo Bills (6-2) at Atlanta Falcons (2-6)

Team	1	2	3	4	Total
Bills	7	0	14	7	28
• Falcons	0	3	17	10	30

- Date: Sunday November 5, 1989
- Location: Fulton County Stadium - Atlanta, Georgia
- Game start: 1:00pm EST
- Game attendance: 45,267
- Game weather: 56 °F or 13.3 °C; wind 7 miles per hour (11 km/h; 6.1 kn)
- Referee: Bob McElwee
- TV announcers (NFL on NBC): Joel Meyers and Paul Maguire

This would be the final win of the season for Atlanta.

==== Week 10 ====
Team	1	2	3	4	Total
Colts	0	0	0	7	7
• Bills	13	14	0	3	30

- Date: November 12
- Location: Rich Stadium, Orchard Park, New York
- Game start: 1:00 p.m.
- Game weather: 38 °F or 3.3 °C; wind 19 miles per hour (31 km/h; 17 kn)
- Referee: Fred Wyant
- TV announcers (NFL on NBC): Joel Meyers and Paul Maguire

Scoring summary
Q1	BUF	Thurman Thomas 8 yard pass from Jim Kelly (Scott Norwood kick)	BUF 7–0
Q1	BUF	Scott Norwood 42 yard field goal	BUF 10–0
Q1	BUF	Scott Norwood 40 yard field goal	BUF 13–0
Q2	BUF	Andre Reed 32 yard pass from Jim Kelly (Scott Norwood kick)	BUF 20–0
Q2	BUF	Andre Reed 3 yard pass from Jim Kelly (Scott Norwood kick)	BUF 27–0
Q4	BUF	Scott Norwood 32 yard field goal	BUF 30–0
Q4	IND	Randy Dixon recovered fumble in end zone (Dean Biasucci kick)	BUF 30–7

==== Week 11 ====
Buffalo Bills (7-3) at New England Patriots (3-7)

Team	1	2	3	4	Total
Bills	7	3	0	14	24
• Patriots	0	6	7	20	33

- Date: Nov 19, 1989
- Location: Foxboro Stadium - Foxborough, Massachusetts
- Game start: 1:00pm EST
- Game weather: 34 °F or 1.1 °C
- Referee: Ben Dreith
- TV announcers (NFL on NBC): Charlie Jones and Merlin Olsen

==== Week 12 vs. Cincinnati Bengals ====
Week 12: Cincinnati Bengals at Buffalo Bills

Quarter	1	2	3	4	Total
Bengals	0	0	7	0	**7**
**Bills**	3	7	7	7	**24**

at Rich Stadium, Orchard Park, NY

- Date: November 26, 1989
- Game time: 1:00 p.m. EST
- Game weather: Overcast, 41 °F or 5 °C, wind 18 mph (29 km/h)
- Game attendance: 80,074
- TV announcers (NBC): Don Criqui and Ahmad Rashad

Game information

**First quarter**

**Second quarter**

**Third quarter**

**Fourth quarter**

Top passers

- CIN – Boomer Esiason – 11/26, 136 yards, INT
- BUF – Jim Kelly – 10/15, 123 yards, 3 TD

Top rushers

- CIN – James Brooks – 20 rushes, 105 yards
- BUF – Thurman Thomas – 26 rushes, 100 yards

Top receivers

- CIN – Tim McGee – 5 receptions, 89 yards
- BUF – Ronnie Harmon – 1 receptions, 42 yards, TD

Bills first win vs Bengals since 09/11/1983

==== Week 13: at Seattle Seahawks ====
Week Thirteen: Seattle Seahawks vs. Buffalo Bills – Game summary

Quarter	1	2	3	4	Total
Bills	0	10	6	0	**16**
**Seahawks**	10	0	0	7	**17**

at Kingdome, Seattle

- Date: December 4
- Game time: 6:08 pm local
- Game weather: indoors
- Game attendance: 57,682
- Referee: Pat Haggerty
- TV announcers (ABC): Al Michaels, Frank Gifford, and Dan Dierdorf
- Gamebook

Game information

**First quarter**

- SEA – Norm Johnson 29-yard field goal, 11:04 (SEA 3–0)
- SEA – Curt Warner 1-yard run (Steve Largent run), 6:56 (SEA 10–0)

**Second quarter**

- BUF – Andre Reed 61-yard pass from Jim Kelly (Scott Norwood kick), 12:52 (SEA 10–7)
- BUF – Scott Norwood 32-yard field goal, 1:08 (Tied 10–10)

**Third quarter**

- BUF – Scott Norwood 40-yard field goal, 12:131 (BUF 13–10)
- BUF – Scott Norwood 43-yard field goal, 6:40 (BUF 16–10)

**Fourth quarter**

- SEA – John L. Williams 51-yard pass from Dave Krieg (Norm Johnson kick), 5:38 (SEA 17–16)

**Top passers**

- BUF – Jim Kelly: 10/23, 144 yds, 1 TD, 1 INT
- SEA – Dave Krieg: 20/40, 298 yds, 1 TD, 2 INT

**Top rushers**

- BUF – Thurman Thomas: 21 car, 79 yds
- SEA – Curt Warner: 16 car, 57 yds, 1 TD

**Top receivers**

- BUF – Andre Reed: 2 rec, 77 yds, 1 TD
- SEA – John L. Williams: 5 rec, 80 yds, 1 TD

**Team** – pass – rush – total – to

- BUF – 135 – 97 – 232 – 2
- SEA – 277 – 78 – 355 – 2

==== Week 14 ====
New Orleans Saints (6-7) at Buffalo Bills (8-5)

Team	1	2	3	4	Total
• Saints	13	3	3	3	22
Bills	0	12	7	0	19

- Date: December 10
- Location: Rich Stadium Orchard Park, NY
- Game start: 1:00pm EST
- Game attendance: 70,037
- Game weather: 27 °F or −2.8 °C; wind 15–25 miles per hour (24–40 km/h; 13–22 kn); wind chill 10 °F or −12.2 °C; snow
- Referee: Dick Jorgensen
- TV announcers (CBS): Dick Stockton and Dan Fouts

- The Bills had the chance to clinch the AFC Eastern Title this game.
- John Fourcade was the named starter for the Saints ahead of Bobby Hebert.

==== Week 15 ====
Buffalo Bills (8-6) at San Francisco 49ers (12-2)

Team	1	2	3	4	Total
Bills	3	0	0	7	10
• 49ers	0	0	7	14	21

- Date: December 17
- Location: Candlestick Park San Francisco, CA
- Game start: 4:00pm EST
- Game attendance: 60,927
- Game weather: 47 °F or 8.3 °C; wind 8 miles per hour (13 km/h; 7.0 kn)
- Referee: Johnny Grier
- TV announcers (NBC): Dick Enberg and Bill Walsh

Scoring summary
Q1	BUF	Scott Norwood 23 yard field goal	BUF 3–0
Q3	SF	Roger Craig 1 yard rush (Mike Cofer kick)	SF 7–3
Q4	SF	Steve Young 2 yard rush (Mike Cofer kick)	SF 14–3
Q4	SF	Jerry Rice 8 yard pass from Steve Young (Mike Cofer kick)	SF 21–3
Q4	BUF	Jim Kelly 1 yard rush (Scott Norwood kick)	SF 21–10

- For the second week in a row, the Bills had the chance to clinch the AFC Eastern Division title with a win.
- The 49ers sat Joe Montana as they clinched all they needed the prior week, therefore, backup Steve Young was the starter for San Francisco in this game.

==== Week 16 ====
Buffalo Bills (8-7) at New York Jets (4-11)

Team	1	2	3	4	Total
• Bills	3	7	20	7	37
Jets	0	0	0	0	0

- Date: Saturday December 23
- Location: The Meadowlands East Rutherford, NJ
- Game start: 12:30pm EST
- Game attendance: 21,148
- Game weather: 12 °F or −11.1 °C, relative humidity 52%, wind 18 miles per hour (29 km/h; 16 kn); wind chill −6 °F or −21.1 °C
- Referee: Fred Wyant
- TV announcers (NBC): Dick Enberg and Bill Walsh

- Bills clinch AFC Eastern Division title with the win.

=== Standings ===
AFC East
	W	L	T	PCT	DIV	CONF	PF	PA	STK
^{(3)} Buffalo Bills	9	7	0	.563	6–2	8–4	409	317	W1
Indianapolis Colts	8	8	0	.500	4–4	7–5	298	301	L1
Miami Dolphins	8	8	0	.500	4–4	6–8	331	379	L2
New England Patriots	5	11	0	.313	4–4	5–7	297	391	L3
New York Jets	4	12	0	.250	2–6	3–9	253	411	L3

== Playoffs ==
=== AFC Divisional Playoff ===
Buffalo Bills (9–7) at Cleveland Browns (9–6–1)

Cleveland Browns 34, Buffalo Bills 30

Quarter	1	2	3	4	Total
Bills	7	7	7	9	30
Browns	3	14	14	3	34

at Cleveland Stadium, Cleveland, Ohio

- Game time: Saturday, January 6, 1990. 12:30 p.m. EST
- Game attendance: 77,706
- Referee: Dick Jorgensen
- TV announcers (NBC): Charlie Jones and Merlin Olsen

In a shootout, Browns linebacker Clay Matthews intercepted Bills quarterback Jim Kelly at the Cleveland 1-yard line with 3 seconds remaining to preserve a 34–30 victory. Kelly threw for 405 yards and 4 touchdowns while Browns quarterback Bernie Kosar threw for 251 yards and 3 touchdowns with no interceptions. Browns receiver Webster Slaughter had the best postseason performance of his career with 3 receptions for 114 yards and 2 touchdowns.

Buffalo scored first with wide receiver Andre Reed's 72-yard touchdown reception. But Cleveland struck back with a 45-yard field goal by Matt Bahr and a 52-yard touchdown pass from Kosar to Slaughter. Kelly's 33-yard touchdown pass to James Lofton put the Bills back in the lead, 14–10, but Browns retook the lead with Ron Middleton's 3-yard catch shortly before the end of the first half.

On the opening drive of the second half, Kosar hooked up with Slaughter for another touchdown pass, this one 44-yards, to increase their lead to 24–14. Buffalo responded with a 6-yard touchdown catch by running back Thurman Thomas, who tied an NFL playoff record with 13 receptions for 150 yards. But Browns running back Eric Metcalf returned the ensuing kickoff 90 yards for a touchdown to give his team a 31–21 lead by the end of the third quarter. After an exchange of field goals, Thomas caught a three-yard touchdown pass. But the extra point failed, forcing the Bills to attempt to score a touchdown instead of a field goal on their final drive. With time running out, Kelly led the Bills to Cleveland's 11-yard line, but halfback Ronnie Harmon dropped a potential game-winning catch in the end zone, and Matthews intercepted Kelly on the next play.

== Awards and records ==
- Shane Conlan, Pro Bowl Selection
- Kent Hull, Pro Bowl Selection
- Bruce Smith, Pro Bowl Selection
- Thurman Thomas, Pro Bowl Selection
- Thurman Thomas, NFL Combined Yards from Scrimmage Leader

== See also ==
- List of NFL teams affected by internal conflict
