= 1988 Buffalo Bills season =

29th season in franchise history

- Owner: Ralph Wilson
- General manager: Bill Polian
- Head coach: Marv Levy
- Offensive coordinator: Jim Ringo
- Defensive coordinator: Walt Corey
- Home stadium: Rich Stadium

Results
- Record: 12–4
- Division place: 1st AFC East
- Playoffs: Won Divisional Playoffs (vs. Oilers) 17–10; Lost AFC Championship (at Bengals) 10–21
- Pro Bowlers: QB Jim Kelly; WR Andre Reed; C Kent Hull; DE Bruce Smith; DT Fred Smerlas; OLB Cornelius Bennett; ILB Shane Conlan; K Scott Norwood

The 1988 Buffalo Bills season was the franchise's 29th overall season as a football team and the 19th in the National Football League. The Bills ended a streak of four consecutive losing seasons by winning the AFC East. They finished the 1988 season with a record of twelve wins and four losses; it was the club's first winning season since 1981, its first 12-win season since the 1964 AFL championship season, and only the fifth double-digit win season in team history. The Bills were 8–0 at home for the first time in their franchise history. On the road, the Bills were 4–4. From an attendance standpoint, the franchise set a record for attendance with 631,818 fans. It was only their fourth playoff appearance since the NFL-AFL merger.

This was the first of four consecutive AFC East titles for the Bills. They started the season 11–1 before losing three of their final four games, costing them the top seed in the AFC, and home-field advantage throughout the playoffs.

It was Buffalo's first trip to the postseason since 1981. The Bills were the #2 seed in the AFC (behind #1 Cincinnati), giving the Bills their first home playoff game since the 1966 AFL Championship, and their first ever playoff game at Rich Stadium. The 1988 season would be the first of five AFC Championship game appearances over six seasons, and their only loss in the conference championship game.

The 1988 season was the first for running back Thurman Thomas, nose tackle Jeff Wright, and linebacker Carlton Bailey. Thomas would rush for 881 yards, despite only carrying the ball 207 times (42.7% of total team carries by a running back) while sharing carries with Robb Riddick, Jamie Mueller and Ronnie Harmon.

The Bills had a dominant defense in 1988: they gave up the fewest points (237) and the fewest total yards (4,578) in the AFC in 1988. The defensive unit was given the nickname "Blizzard Defense", alluding to Buffalo's harsh winters.

Four Bills players made the All-Pro team in 1988: defensive end Bruce Smith, linebackers Shane Conlan and Cornelius Bennett, and kicker Scott Norwood.

Head coach Marv Levy was named NFL Coach of the Year by The Sporting News and UPI.

== Offseason ==
=== NFL draft ===
ESPN's cameras watched Oklahoma State running back Thurman Thomas in his home as he waited to be drafted. He fell to the second round, where the Bills made him their first pick at 40th overall. Thomas would go on to a Pro Football Hall of Fame career, where he would eclipse O. J. Simpson's all-time team rushing record with 12,074 yards. Thomas would set an NFL record by leading the league in yards-from-scrimmage for four consecutive years, from 1989 to 1992. (The record of three was previously held by Hall of Famer Jim Brown.) Thomas was a five-time Pro Bowl selection and NFL Offensive Player of the Year in 1992.

1988 Buffalo Bills draft
Round	Pick	Player	Position	College	Notes
2	40	Thurman Thomas * ^{†}	RB	Oklahoma State	
3	65	Bernard Ford	WR	Central Florida	
5	123	Ezekial Gadson	DB	Pittsburgh	
5	135	Kirk Roach	K	Western Carolina	
6	150	Dan Murray	OLB	East Stroudsburg	
7	177	Tim Borcky	OT	Memphis	
7	184	Bo Wright	RB	Alabama	
8	204	John Hagy	DB	Texas	
8	213	Jeff Wright	DT	Central Missouri State	
9	235	Carlton Bailey	ILB	North Carolina	
10	262	Martin Mayhew	CB	Florida State	Placed on injured reserve
11	289	Pete Curkendall	DT	Penn State	
12	309	John Driscoll	OT	New Hampshire	
12	316	Tom Erlandson	LB	Washington	
Made roster † Pro Football Hall of Fame * Made at least one Pro Bowl during career

== Personnel ==
=== Staff ===
1988 Buffalo Bills staff
Front office: President – Ralph Wilson; Vice president of administration/general manager – Bill Polian; Vice president of football operations – Marv Levy; Director of college scouting – John Butler; Director of Pro Personnel/Asst. Director of Football Operations – Bob Ferguson; National scout – Norm Pollom; College scout – A. J. Smith; Administrative assistant to the head coach – Chuck Dickerson; Head coaches: Head coach – Marv Levy; Offensive coaches: Offensive coordinator/offensive line – Jim Ringo; Quarterbacks/Passing Game Coordinator – Ted Marchibroda; Running backs – Elijah Pitts; Receivers – Ted Tollner; Tight ends – Chuck Dickerson	Defensive coaches: Defensive coordinator/linebackers – Walt Corey; Defensive line – Ted Cottrell; Defensive backs – Dick Roach; Defensive assistant – Chuck Lester; Special teams coaches: Special teams – Bruce DeHaven; Strength and conditioning: Strength and conditioning coordinator – Rusty Jones

=== Roster ===
1988 Buffalo Bills roster
Quarterbacks: 8 Stan Gelbaugh; 12 Jim Kelly; 14 Frank Reich; Running backs: 35 Carl Byrum FB; 33 Ronnie Harmon KR; 39 Jamie Mueller FB; 40 Robb Riddick KR; 34 Thurman Thomas; Wide receivers: 85 Chris Burkett; 80 Flip Johnson KR/PR; 86 Trumaine Johnson; 83 Andre Reed; 89 Steve Tasker; Tight ends: 84 Keith McKeller; 88 Pete Metzelaars; 87 Butch Rolle	Offensive linemen: 75 Howard Ballard T; 61 Leonard Burton C; 70 Joe Devlin T; 71 Dale Hellestrae LS/T; 67 Kent Hull C; 51 Jim Ritcher G; 73 Will Wolford T; Defensive linemen: 94 Mark Pike DE; 96 Leon Seals DE; 76 Fred Smerlas NT; 78 Bruce Smith DE; 72 Art Still DE; 91 Jeff Wright NT	Linebackers: 54 Carlton Bailey ILB; 55 Cornelius Bennett OLB; 50 Ray Bentley ILB; 58 Shane Conlan ILB; 99 Hal Garner OLB; 97 Scott Radecic ILB; 56 Darryl Talley OLB; Defensive backs: 29 Derrick Burroughs CB; 20 Sherman Cocroft CB/S; 21 Wayne Davis CB; 45 Dwight Drane SS; 47 Kirby Jackson CB; 38 Mark Kelso FS; 37 Nate Odomes CB; 46 Leonard Smith SS; 22 Erroll Tucker CB/KR/PR; Special teams: 4 John Kidd; 11 Scott Norwood	Reserve lists: 81 Walter Broughton WR (IR); 68 Tony Brown T (IR); 53 Tom Erlandson LB (IR); 82 Bernard Ford WR (IR); 49 John Hagy S (IR); 42 Joe Howard WR (IR); -- Martin Mayhew CB (IR); 74 Bruce Mesner NT (IR); 57 Dan Murray LB (IR); 98 Elston Ridgle DE (IR); 64 Rich Strenger T (IR); 65 Tim Vogler G (IR); -- Bo Wright RB (IR); rookies in italics 47 active, 13 inactive

== Regular season ==
=== Schedule ===
Week	Date	Opponent	Result	Record	Venue	Attendance
1	September 4	Minnesota Vikings	**W** 13–10	1–0	Rich Stadium	76,783
2	September 11	**Miami Dolphins**	**W** 9–6	2–0	Rich Stadium	79,520
3	September 18	at **New England Patriots**	**W** 16–14	3–0	Sullivan Stadium	55,945
4	September 25	Pittsburgh Steelers	**W** 36–28	4–0	Rich Stadium	78,735
5	October 2	at Chicago Bears	**L** 3–24	4–1	Soldier Field	62,793
6	October 9	**Indianapolis Colts**	**W** 34–23	5–1	Rich Stadium	76,018
7	October 17	at **New York Jets**	**W** 37–14	6–1	Giants Stadium	70,218
8	October 23	**New England Patriots**	**W** 23–20	7–1	Rich Stadium	76,824
9	October 30	Green Bay Packers	**W** 28–0	8–1	Rich Stadium	79,176
10	November 6	at Seattle Seahawks	**W** 13–3	9–1	Kingdome	61,074
11	November 14	at **Miami Dolphins**	**W** 31–6	10–1	Joe Robbie Stadium	67,091
12	November 20	**New York Jets**	**W** 9–6 (OT)	11–1	Rich Stadium	78,389
13	November 27	at Cincinnati Bengals	**L** 21–35	11–2	Riverfront Stadium	58,672
14	December 4	at Tampa Bay Buccaneers	**L** 5–10	11–3	Tampa Stadium	49,498
15	December 11	Los Angeles Raiders	**W** 37–21	12–3	Rich Stadium	77,348
16	December 18	at **Indianapolis Colts**	**L** 14–17	12–4	Hoosier Dome	59,908
Note: Intra-division opponents are in **bold** text.

=== Season summary ===
==== Week 1 ====
Team	1	2	3	4	Total
Vikings	0	3	0	7	10
• **Bills**	10	0	0	3	13

- Date: September 4
- Location: Rich Stadium, Orchard Park, New York
- Game start: 1:00 p.m. EST
- Game weather: 68 °F (20 °C), wind 11 mph (18 km/h)
- Referee: Bob McElwee
- TV announcers (CBS): Tim Ryan and Dan Jiggetts
- Source: Pro-Football-Reference.com

Scoring summary
1	Bills	Scott Norwood 27-yard field goal	Bills 3–0
1	Bills	Thurman Thomas 5-yard run (Scott Norwood kick)	Bills 10–0
2	Vikings	Chuck Nelson 30-yard field goal	Bills 10–3
4	Bills	Scott Norwood 26-yard field goal	Bills 13–3
4	Vikings	Allen Rice 2-yard run (Chuck Nelson kick)	Bills 13–10

==== Week 2 ====
Miami Dolphins (0-1) at Buffalo Bills (1-0)

Team	1	2	3	4	Total
Dolphins	3	0	3	0	6
• Bills	0	3	0	6	9

- Date: September 11
- Location: Rich Stadium, Orchard Park, New York
- Game start: 1:00 p.m. EST
- Game weather: 60 °F (16 °C), wind 9 mph (14 km/h)
- Referee: Johnny Grier
- TV announcers (NBC): Chuck Thompson and Jerry Kramer

Scoring summary
1	MIA	Fuad Reveiz 31 yard field goal	Dolphins 3–0
2	BUF	Scott Norwood 41 yard field goal	Tie 3–3
3	MIA	Fuad Reveiz 27 yard field goal	Dolphins 6–3
4	BUF	Scott Norwood 35 yard field goal	Tie 6–6
4	BUF	Scott Norwood 28 yard field goal	Bills 9–6

==== Week 3 ====
Team	1	2	3	4	Total
• Bills	0	3	3	10	16
Patriots	0	14	0	0	14

- Date: September 18
- Location: Sullivan Stadium, Foxboro, Massachusetts
- Game start: 1:00 p.m. EST
- Game attendance: 55,945
- Game weather: 67 °F (19 °C) •Wind 14 miles per hour (23 km/h; 12 kn)
- Referee: Fred Wyant
- Television network: NBC

Scoring summary
2	BUF	Scott Norwood 38 yard field goal	Bills 3–0
2	NE	Cedric Jones 41 yard pass from Steve Grogan (Teddy Garcia kick)	Patriots 7–3
2	NE	Stanley Morgan 19 yard pass from Steve Grogan (Teddy Garcia kick)	Patriots 14–3
3	BUF	Scott Norwood 44 yard field goal	Patriots 14–6
4	BUF	Robb Riddick 3 yard pass from Jim Kelly (Scott Norwood kick)	Patriots 14–13
4	BUF	Scott Norwood 41 yard field goal	Bills 16–14

==== Week 4 ====
Team	1	2	3	4	Total
Steelers	0	14	0	14	28
• Bills	10	6	14	6	36

- Date: September 25
- Location: Rich Stadium, Orchard Park, New York
- Game start: 1:00 p.m.
- Game weather: 57 °F (14 °C); wind 7 mph (11 km/h)
- Referee: Ben Dreith
- TV announcers (NBC): Curt Gowdy and Al DeRogatis

Scoring summary
Q1	BUF	Norwood 38 yard field goal	BUF 3–0
Q1	BUF	Burkett 26 yard pass from Kelly (Norwood kick)	BUF 10–0
Q2	PIT	Brister 1 yard run (Anderson kick)	BUF 10–7
Q2	BUF	Norwood 39 yard field goal	BUF 13–7
Q2	PIT	Williams 5 yard pass from Brister (Anderson kick)	PIT 14–13
Q2	BUF	Norwood 39 yard field goal	BUF 16–14
Q3	BUF	Riddick 1 yard run (Norwood kick)	BUF 23–14
Q3	BUF	Riddick 5 yard blocked punt return (Norwood kick)	BUF 30–14
Q4	BUF	Norwood 48 yard field goal	BUF 33–14
Q4	BUF	Norwood 49 yard field goal	BUF 36–14
Q4	PIT	Brister 1 yard run (Anderson kick)	BUF 36–17
Q4	PIT	Thompson 42 yard pass from Brister (Anderson kick)	BUF 36–24

==== Week 5 ====
Buffalo Bills (4-0) at Chicago Bears (4-0)

Team	1	2	3	4	Total
Bills	3	0	0	0	3
• Bears	7	17	0	0	24

- Date: October 2, 1988
- Location: Soldier Field, Chicago, Illinois
- Game start: 1:00 p.m. EST
- Game attendance: 62,793
- Game weather: 59 °F (15 °C); wind 11 mph (18 km/h)
- Referee: Fred Silva
- TV announcers (NBC): Curt Gowdy, Merlin Olsen
- Source: Pro-Football-Reference.com

Scoring summary
1	Bears	Emery Moorehead 4-yard pass from Jim McMahon (Kevin Butler kick)	Bears 7–0
1	Bills	Scott Norwood 28-yard field goal	Bears 7–3
2	Bears	Ron Morris 63-yard pass from Jim McMahon (Kevin Butler kick)	Bears 14–3
2	Bears	Kevin Butler 22-yard field goal	Bears 17–3
2	Bears	Dennis Gentry 58-yard rush (Kevin Butler kick)	Bears 24–3

==== Week 6 ====
Indianapolis Colts (1-4) at Buffalo Bills (4-1)

Team	1	2	3	4	Total
Colts	10	7	3	3	23
• **Bills**	0	7	14	13	34

- Date: October 9, 1988
- Location: Rich Stadium, Orchard Park, New York
- Game start: 1:00 p.m. EST
- Game attendance: 76,018
- Game weather: 42 °F (6 °C), wind 7 mph (11 km/h)
- Referee: Tom Dooley
- TV announcers (NBC): Tom Hammond and Dave Lapham
- Source: Pro-Football-Reference.com

Scoring summary
1	Colts	Dean Biasucci 31-yard field goal	Colts 3–0
1	Colts	Chris Chandler 1-yard run (Dean Biasucci kick)	Colts 10–0
2	Colts	Clarence Verdin 39-yard pass from Gary Hogeboom (Dean Biasucci kick)	Colts 17–0
2	Bills	Ronnie Harmon 26-yard pass from Jim Kelly (Scott Norwood kick)	Colts 17–7
3	Bills	Andre Reed 16-yard pass from Jim Kelly (Scott Norwood kick)	Colts 17–14
3	Colts	Dean Biasucci 40-yard field goal	Colts 20–14
3	Bills	Andre Reed 12-yard pass from Jim Kelly (Scott Norwood kick)	Bills 21–20
4	Colts	Dean Biasucci 22-yard field goal	Colts 23–21
4	Bills	Scott Norwood 45-yard field goal	Bills 24–23
4	Bills	Scott Norwood 19-yard field goal	Bills 27–23
4	Bills	Robb Riddick 1-yard run (Scott Norwood kick)	Bills 34–23

==== Week 7 ====
Team	1	2	3	4	Total
• **Bills**	17	14	3	3	37
Jets	0	7	7	0	14

- Date: October 17
- Location: Giants Stadium • East Rutherford, New Jersey
- Game start: 9:00 p.m. EST
- Game weather: 63 °F (17 °C) • Wind 13 mph (21 km/h)
- Referee: Dick Jorgensen
- TV announcers (ABC): Al Michaels, Frank Gifford, Dan Dierdorf

Scoring summary
1	BUF	Scott Norwood 30-yard field goal	Bills 3–0
1	BUF	Andre Reed 65-yard pass from Jim Kelly (Scott Norwood kick)	Bills 10–0
1	BUF	Flip Johnson 66-yard pass from Jim Kelly (Scott Norwood kick)	Bills 17–0
2	BUF	Robb Riddick 1-yard run (Scott Norwood kick)	Bills 24–0
2	NYJ	Johnny Hector 1-yard run (Pat Leahy kick)	Bills 24–7
2	BUF	Andre Reed 16-yard pass from Jim Kelly (Scott Norwood kick)	Bills 31–7
3	BUF	Scott Norwood 34-yard field goal	Bills 34–7
3	NYJ	Erik McMillan 40-yard interception return (Pat Leahy kick)	Bills 34–14
4	BUF	Scott Norwood 28-yard field goal	Bills 37–14

==== Week 9 ====
Team	1	2	3	4	Total
Packers	0	0	0	0	0
• Bills	7	7	7	7	28

- Date: October 30
- Location: Rich Stadium, Orchard Park, New York
- Game start: 1:00 p.m. EST
- Game weather: 36 °F (2 °C); wind 15 mph (24 km/h)
- Referee: Gene Barth
- TV announcers (NFL on CBS): Greg Gumbel and Ken Stabler

Scoring summary
Q1	BUF	Riddick 2 yard run (Norwood kick)	BUF 7–0
Q2	BUF	Rolle 1 yard pass from Kelly (Norwood kick)	BUF 14–0
Q3	BUF	Kelso 78 yard interception return (Norwood kick)	BUF 21–0
Q4	BUF	Seals 7 yard fumble return (Norwood kick)	BUF 28–0

- Thurman Thomas 23 Rush, 116 Yds

==== Week 12 ====
Team	1	2	3	4	OT	Total
Jets	0	3	0	3	0	6
• **Bills**	0	0	3	3	3	9

- Date: November 20
- Location: Rich Stadium • Orchard Park, New York
- Game start: 1:00 p.m. EST
- Game attendance: 78,389
- Game weather: 43 °F (6 °C) • Wind 10 mph (16 km/h)
- Referee: Dick Hantak
- TV announcers (NBC): Don Criqui and Bob Trumpy

Scoring summary
2	NYJ	Pat Leahy 23-yard field goal	Jets 3–0
3	BUF	Scott Norwood 25-yard field goal	Tie 3–3
4	BUF	Scott Norwood 26-yard field goal	Bills 6–3
4	NYJ	Pat Leahy 40-yard field goal	Tie 6–6
OT	BUF	Scott Norwood 30-yard field goal	Bills 9–6

The Bills clinch the AFC Eastern division title.

=== Week 16 ===
Buffalo Bills at Indianapolis Colts

Team	1	2	3	4	Total
Bills	0	7	0	7	14
• Colts	3	0	0	14	17

- Date: December 18, 1988
- Location: Hoosier Dome Indianapolis, IN
- Game start: 1:00 p.m. EST
- Game attendance: 59,908
- Game weather: DOME
- TV announcers (NBC): Marv Albert and Paul Maguire

The loss cost the Bills homefield advantage in the AFC playoffs.

=== Standings ===
AFC East
	W	L	T	PCT	DIV	CONF	PF	PA	STK
^{(2)} Buffalo Bills	12	4	0	.750	7–1	10–2	329	237	L1
Indianapolis Colts	9	7	0	.563	5–3	7–5	354	315	W1
New England Patriots	9	7	0	.563	5–3	7–5	250	284	L1
New York Jets	8	7	1	.531	3–5	6–7–1	372	354	W2
Miami Dolphins	6	10	0	.375	0–8	3–9	319	380	L1

== Playoffs ==
=== AFC Divisional Playoff ===
Buffalo Bills 17, Houston Oilers 10

Quarter	1	2	3	4	Total
Oilers	0	3	0	7	10
Bills	0	7	7	3	17

at Rich Stadium, Orchard Park, New York

- Game time: 12:30 pm EST
- Game attendance: 79,532
- Referee: Gordon McCarter
- TV announcers (NBC): Marv Albert and Paul Maguire

Buffalo's first playoff game in seven years, first home playoff playoff game in 22 years (since their days in the AFL) and first-ever playoff game at Rich Stadium was a 17–10 win over the Oilers. Jim Kelly threw for 244 yards and an interception while Thurman Thomas and Robb Riddick had rushing scores to go with 87 rushing yards. The Bills intercepted Warren Moon once and forced two Oilers fumbles.

=== AFC Championship Game ===
Cincinnati Bengals 21, Buffalo Bills 10

Quarter	1	2	3	4	Total
Bills	0	10	0	0	10
Bengals	7	7	0	7	21

at Riverfront Stadium, Cincinnati

- Game time: 12:30 pm EST
- Game attendance: 59,747
- Referee: Gene Barth
- TV announcers (NBC): Dick Enberg and Merlin Olsen

The Bengals forced three interceptions and allowed only 45 rushing yards and 136 passing yards to go with an offense that held the ball for 39:29 out of sixty minutes. Bills starting running back Thurman Thomas was held to just six yards on four carries, while quarterback Jim Kelly completed only 14-of-30 passes for 161 yards, one touchdown, and three interceptions.

== Awards and records ==
=== All-Pros ===
First Team

- Bruce Smith, Defensive end
- Shane Conlan, Linebacker
- Cornelius Bennett, Linebacker
- Scott Norwood, Kicker

Second Team

- Kent Hull, Center
- Nate Odomes, Cornerback (Associated Press honorable mention)
