= Bruce Smith =

American football player (born 1963)

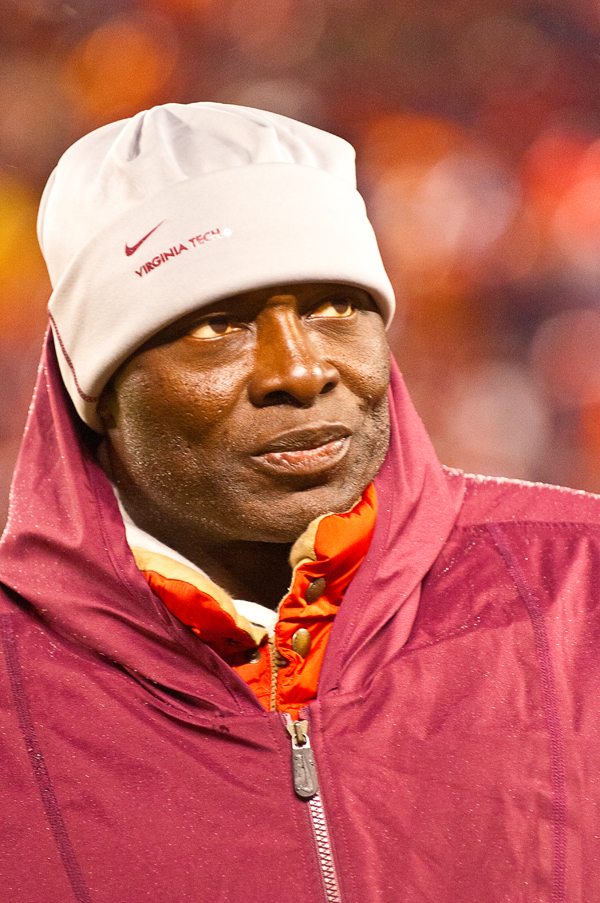
- Smith in 2011

No. 78
- Position: Defensive end

Personal information
- Born: June 18, 1963 (age 63); Norfolk, Virginia, U.S.
- Listed height: 6 ft 4 in (1.93 m)
- Listed weight: 262 lb (119 kg)

Career information
- High school: Booker T. Washington (Norfolk)
- College: Virginia Tech (1981–1984)
- NFL draft: 1985: 1st round, 1st overall pick

Career history
- Buffalo Bills (1985–1999); Washington Redskins (2000–2003)

Awards and highlights
- 2× NFL Defensive Player of the Year (1990, 1996); 8× First-team All-Pro (1987, 1988, 1990, 1993–1997); 3× Second-team All-Pro (1989, 1992, 1998); 11× Pro Bowl (1987–1990, 1992–1998); 2× NFL forced fumbles co-leader (1994, 1996); NFL 1980s All-Decade Team; NFL 1990s All-Decade Team; NFL 100th Anniversary All-Time Team; Buffalo Bills Wall of Fame; Buffalo Bills 50th Anniversary Team; Buffalo Bills No. 78 retired; Outland Trophy (1984); Consensus All-American (1984); First-team All-American (1983); Second-team All-South Independent (1982); Second-team AP All-Time All-American (2025); Virginia Tech Hokies No. 78 retired; NFL records: Most career sacks: 200; Most seasons with 1+ sacks: 19; Most seasons with 10+ sacks: 13

Career NFL statistics
- Total tackles: 1,224
- Sacks: 200
- Safeties: 2
- Forced fumbles: 43
- Fumble recoveries: 15
- Interceptions: 2
- Defensive touchdowns: 1
- Stats at Pro Football Reference
- Pro Football Hall of Fame
- College Football Hall of Fame

Bruce Bernard Smith (born June 18, 1963) is an American former professional football defensive end who played in the National Football League (NFL) for 19 seasons, primarily with the Buffalo Bills. He played college football for the Virginia Tech Hokies, winning the Outland Trophy in 1984. Smith was selected by the Bills first overall in the 1985 NFL draft.

Considered one of the greatest defensive ends of all time, Smith is the NFL's all-time career leader in quarterback sacks with 200. (Note: Note that the NFL only began tracking sacks as an official statistic in 1982, three years before Smith entered the league.) Smith also received 11 Pro Bowl selections and eight first-team All-Pro honors, while appearing in four consecutive Super Bowls with the Bills. He was inducted to the College Football Hall of Fame in 2006 and the Pro Football Hall of Fame in 2009.

== Early life ==
Smith is a native of Norfolk, Virginia, where he graduated from Booker T. Washington High School. In addition to being an All-American football player in high school, he played basketball, baseball, and wrestled. Smith accepted an athletic scholarship to play football at Virginia Tech.

== College career ==
Known as "the Sack Man" as a Hokie, Smith finished his college career in 1984 as the most honored player in Hokie history. Foreshadowing his future success in pursuing quarterbacks in the NFL, he had a career total of 71 tackles behind the line of scrimmage, for losses totaling 504 yards. Smith had 46 career sacks, including an NCAA-leading 22 during a junior season in 1983 that saw him named First-team All-America by the AFCA (Coaches) and Newspaper Enterprise Association. In 1984, Smith capped off his tenure in Blacksburg with the Outland Trophy, given to the nation's top lineman, and a consensus selection to the All-America Team. His accomplishments at Virginia Tech earned him a spot in the Virginia Tech Sports Hall of Fame.

== Professional football career ==
=== Buffalo Bills ===
Following his stellar collegiate career, Smith was selected by both the Buffalo Bills with the first pick of the 1985 NFL draft and by the United States Football League Baltimore Stars in the 1985 USFL Territorial Draft, and he decided to sign with the Bills. In his rookie year, he had just 6.5 sacks while starting thirteen games. After a rookie season in which his poor training habits and self-admitted "indulgence" limited his effectiveness, inspiration from teammate Darryl Talley and finding love with a college counselor whom he eventually married inspired him to improve his game. He quickly became known as a sack specialist, with fifteen in 1986. He had his first Pro Bowl and All-Pro selection the following year while having twelve sacks in twelve games. He recorded a touchdown that season in the December 13 game against the Indianapolis Colts on a fumble recovery in the end zone. It was his first and only touchdown in his career. He continued his run in 1988 with eleven sacks in twelve games. This was the first season for Smith in the playoffs and he would make the most of it with three sacks in two postseason games, although the Bills lost in the AFC title game to the Cincinnati Bengals.

In March 1989, as a restricted free agent, Smith signed an offer-sheet with the Denver Broncos for $7.5 million over five years. Smith had excelled as their defensive leader, but the Bills were concerned about him with his substance abuse problem (since he had been suspended four games the previous year for it) and thus had him followed by undercover detectives in November, which stuck with him months later. Faced with the choice between Smith and two draft choices from Denver, the Bills picked Smith. Now, as the highest-paid defensive player in the league, Smith would stay with the Bills for a considerable amount of time. He responded by playing in all sixteen games of the season and recording thirteen sacks to make his third straight Pro Bowl. He broke the record for sacks by a Bill all-time during the year (51), and he would continue to raise the total for years to come. Some conjecture that his 171 sacks in Buffalo set a standard that "may be unreachable" for future Bills. He recorded half a sack in the divisional round playoff game that year, which the Bills lost to the Cleveland Browns 34–30.

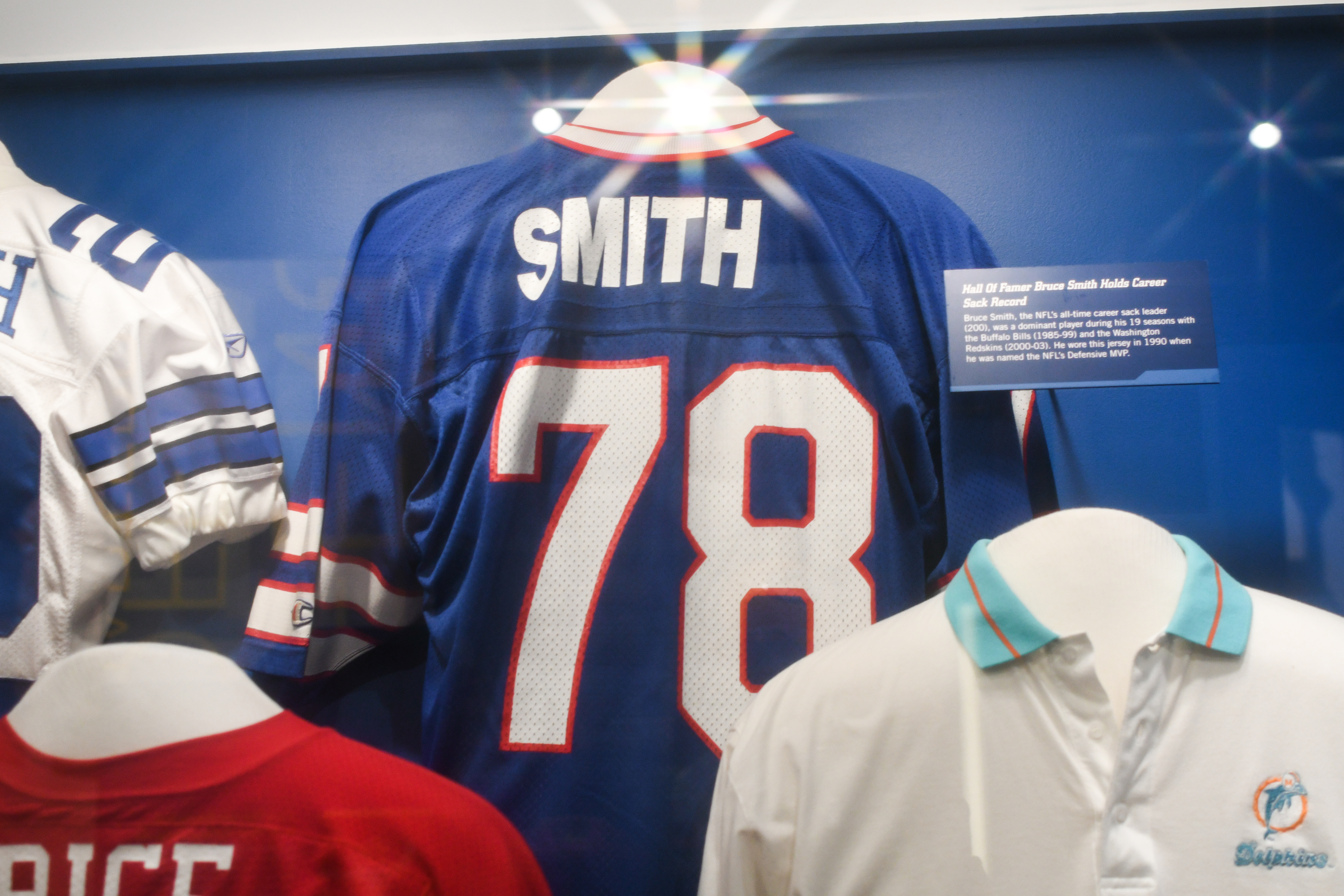
Smith's jersey exhibited at the Pro Football Hall of Fame

The next year, his defensive performance helped bring the Bills to Super Bowl XXV when he set a personal high in sacks with nineteen (three short of the then record for sacks in a season). He did not have a sack in either of the first two playoff games for the Bills, but Smith saved his efforts for Super Bowl XXV against the New York Giants. He sacked Jeff Hostetler in the end zone in the second quarter, becoming only the fifth player to record a Super Bowl safety (which gave the Bills a 12–3 lead in the second quarter). Later, Smith forced New York to turn the ball over on downs by tackling running back Ottis Anderson for a two-yard loss on a fourth-down conversion attempt. Only a failed last-second field goal attempt that narrowly went wide right kept the team from its first NFL championship.

In 1991, though Smith's knee problems forced him out for most of the season, the Bills once again reached the Super Bowl. In 1992, in much better health, Smith was again a first-team All-Pro and was voted to the Pro Bowl while recording a team-leading fourteen sacks, and he repeated his sack total the following year. He led the league in forced fumbles twice with five (1994, 1996).

By 1996, though the Bills' run of Super Bowl appearances had ended, Smith was still putting up prolific numbers, with ninety tackles and fourteen sacks. In 1997, Smith had 65 tackles and fourteen sacks and by 1998, although he was getting older, he still had a respectable fifty tackles and ten sacks.

In the final postseason game of his career, he recorded a best in sacks with 2.5 in the wild card round game for the Bills against the Tennessee Titans, although they lost 22–16 on a last-second controversial play. Smith, along with Andre Reed and Thurman Thomas, were cut from the Bills roster in an emergency salary cap measure after the 1999 season.

=== Washington Redskins ===
Smith signed with the Washington Redskins as a free agent. Although he was now playing in mostly passing situations, he posted 58 tackles and ten sacks in his first season. He pressed onward in pursuit of Reggie White's all-time sacks record (198, achieved in 15 seasons), which he passed in week 14 of the 2003 NFL season by sacking New York Giants quarterback Jesse Palmer in a 20–7 win at Giants Stadium. Smith finished his career with 200 career sacks, the only person ever to reach that mark, on a sack of Chicago Bears quarterback Rex Grossman.

Smith had hinted in interviews that 2003 would be his final season, but never completely ruled out continuing to play. However, on February 24, 2004, the Redskins released Smith, saving $6.5 million in salary cap space.

=== NFL career accomplishments ===
Smith was a first-ballot inductee to the NFL Hall of Fame. In his 19 NFL seasons, Smith played in 279 games, amassing a record 200 sacks, two interceptions, 46 forced fumbles, and 15 fumble recoveries, one of which he returned for a 33-yard touchdown. Of his 19 seasons in the NFL, 13 of them were seasons where he had at least ten sacks, a testament to his consistency year in and year out. He was also named to an All-Pro team ten times. As Smith spent most of his career in a 3–4 defensive scheme, a defensive scheme not geared toward creating sack opportunities for defensive ends, many consider the record particularly impressive. Indeed, Smith's peers elected him to the Pro Bowl every season from 1987 to 1998 (with the exception of his injury-shortened 5-game 1991 season). In 1987, he was named the Pro Bowl MVP. Smith was twice named the AP's NFL Defensive Player of the Year (1990, 1996), twice the NEA's (1990, 1993) and four times the UPI's AFC Defensive Player of the Year (1987, 1988, 1990, 1996).

== Honors ==
- 1995, inducted into the Virginia Tech Sports Hall of Fame in his first year of eligibility.
- 1999, while still an active NFL player, Smith was ranked number 58 on The Sporting News' list of the 100 Greatest Football Players.
- 2005, he was inducted into the Virginia Sports Hall of Fame, honoring players from around the state of Virginia.
- 2006, Smith was voted into the College Football Hall of Fame.
- 2008, he was part of the inaugural class to be inducted into the Hampton Roads Sports Hall of Fame, an institution honoring athletes, coaches and administrators who made contributions to sports in Southeastern Virginia.
- 2008, inducted onto the Buffalo Bills Wall of Fame in 2008.
- 2009, enshrined in the Pro Football Hall of Fame, his first year of eligibility.
- 2016, the Bills announced they were retiring Smith's #78. No player had worn the number since Smith left the team. His number was retired in a halftime ceremony on September 15, 2016, during a game against the New York Jets.

== NFL career statistics ==
Legend
	NFL Defensive Player of the Year
	NFL record
	Led the league
**Bold**	Career high

=== Regular season ===
Year	Team	Games		Tackles					Fumbles				Interceptions			
Year	Team	GP	GS	Sck	Cmb	Solo	Ast	Sfty	FF	FR	Yds	TD	Int	Yds	TD	PD
1985	BUF	16	13	6.5	48	—	—	0	0	**4**	0	0	0	0	0	0
1986	BUF	16	15	15.0	63	—	—	0	3	0	0	0	0	0	0	0
1987	BUF	12	12	12.0	78	—	—	0	3	2	15	**1**	0	0	0	0
1988	BUF	12	12	11.0	56	—	—	**1**	3	0	0	0	0	0	0	0
1989	BUF	16	16	13.0	88	—	—	0	0	0	0	0	0	0	0	0
1990	BUF	16	16	**19.0**	101	—	—	0	4	0	0	0	0	0	0	0
1991	BUF	5	5	1.5	18	—	—	0	0	0	0	0	0	0	0	0
1992	BUF	15	15	14.0	89	—	—	0	3	0	0	0	0	0	0	0
1993	BUF	16	16	14.0	**108**	—	—	0	3	1	0	0	**1**	0	0	0
1994	BUF	15	15	10.0	81	57	**24**	0	**5**	2	0	0	**1**	0	0	0
1995	BUF	15	15	10.5	74	52	22	0	1	1	0	0	0	0	0	0
1996	BUF	16	16	13.5	90	**69**	21	0	**5**	1	0	0	0	0	0	0
1997	BUF	16	16	14.0	65	49	16	0	0	0	0	0	0	0	0	0
1998	BUF	15	15	10.0	50	35	15	0	2	2	**18**	0	0	0	0	0
1999	BUF	16	16	7.0	45	30	15	0	3	1	0	0	0	0	0	**2**
2000	WAS	16	16	10.0	58	50	8	**1**	**5**	0	0	0	0	0	0	**2**
2001	WAS	14	14	5.0	41	30	11	0	3	1	0	0	0	0	0	**2**
2002	WAS	16	16	9.0	49	37	12	0	0	0	0	0	0	0	0	1
2003	WAS	16	8	5.0	22	17	5	0	0	0	0	0	0	0	0	0
Career		279	267	200.0	1,224	1,075	149	2	43	15	33	1	2	0	0	7

=== Postseason ===
Year	Team	Games		Tackles					Fumbles				Interceptions			
Year	Team	GP	GS	Sck	Cmb	Solo	Ast	Sfty	FF	FR	Yds	TD	Int	Yds	TD	PD
1988	BUF	2	2	3.0	—	—	—	0	0	0	0	0	0	0	0	0
1989	BUF	1	1	0.5	—	—	—	0	0	0	0	0	0	0	0	0
1990	BUF	3	3	1.0	—	—	—	**1**	0	0	0	0	0	0	0	0
1991	BUF	3	3	1.0	—	—	—	0	0	0	0	0	0	0	0	0
1992	BUF	4	4	**3.5**	—	—	—	0	**3**	0	0	0	0	0	0	0
1993	BUF	3	3	3.0	—	—	—	0	1	0	0	0	0	0	0	0
1995	BUF	1	1	0.0	1	1	0	0	0	0	0	0	0	0	0	0
1996	BUF	1	1	0.0	3	3	0	0	0	0	0	0	0	0	0	0
1998	BUF	1	1	0.0	4	2	2	0	0	0	0	0	0	0	0	0
1999	BUF	1	1	2.5	6	5	1	0	0	0	0	0	0	0	0	0
Career		20	20	14.5	14	11	3	1	4	0	0	0	0	0	0	0

== Post-football life ==
Smith lives in Virginia Beach, Virginia. Having returned to his home state, Smith works as a large-scale hotel designer, undertaking many projects with Armada Hoffler. Most recently, he returned to Blacksburg, the site of his collegiate successes, where he purchased the Red Lion Inn. He built a Hilton Garden Inn Hotel with 137 sleeping rooms and is working on redeveloping the site (Smith's Landing, hotel and restaurant complex). A Baptist, he is a member of Queen Street Baptist Church in Norfolk. Smith and his wife Carmen (who he married in 1990) have a son, Alston (born 1994).

Smith also works with Thurman Thomas in their new business venture, Legends Energy Group. They promote energy programs across North America.

Smith, Andre Reed, Thurman Thomas, and Jim Kelly were the subject of the 30 for 30 film Four Falls of Buffalo in 2015.

He made an appearance with other Pro Football Hall of Fame players on an episode of Celebrity Family Feud in which Smith notably responded to a question asking for a tool that Captain Hook might use if he was a handyman besides his hook. Smith’s initial answer of “hammer” had already been taken, and his next response was “penis,” causing host Steve Harvey to lose his composure in the middle of the round.
