= Chris Burkett =

American football player (born 1962)

No. 85, 87
- Position: Wide receiver

Personal information
- Born: August 21, 1962 (age 64); Laurel, Mississippi, U.S.
- Listed height: 6 ft 4 in (1.93 m)
- Listed weight: 198 lb (90 kg)

Career information
- High school: Collins (Collins, Mississippi)
- College: Jackson State
- NFL draft: 1985: 2nd round, 42nd overall pick

Career history
- Buffalo Bills (1985–1989); New York Jets (1989–1993)

Career NFL statistics
- Receptions: 292
- Receiving yards: 4,352
- Receiving touchdowns: 19
- Stats at Pro Football Reference

Christopher Leon Burkett (born August 21, 1962) is an American former professional football player who was a wide receiver in the National Football League (NFL). He was selected by the Buffalo Bills in the second round of the 1985 NFL draft with the 42nd overall pick. Standing at 6'4" and 198-lb. from Jackson State, Burkett played in nine NFL seasons for the Bills and the New York Jets from 1985 to 1993.

Burkett serves as the executive director for Big Brothers Big Sisters of Mississippi and is the founder and CEO of Chrisburkettsports.

== NFL career statistics ==
Legend
	Led the league
**Bold**	Career high

=== Regular season ===
Year	Team	Games		Receiving				
Year	Team	GP	GS	Rec	Yds	Avg	Lng	TD
1985	BUF	**16**	1	21	371	17.7	38	0
1986	BUF	14	10	34	**778**	**22.9**	**84**	**4**
1987	BUF	12	12	56	765	13.7	47	**4**
1988	BUF	11	8	23	354	15.4	34	1
1989	BUF	2	2	3	20	6.7	9	0
1989	NYJ	13	3	21	278	13.2	30	1
1990	NYJ	**16**	4	14	204	14.6	46	0
1991	NYJ	15	1	23	327	14.2	50	**4**
1992	NYJ	**16**	5	**57**	724	12.7	37	1
1993	NYJ	**16**	**16**	40	531	13.3	77	**4**
		131	62	292	4,352	14.9	84	19

=== Playoffs ===
Year	Team	Games		Receiving				
Year	Team	GP	GS	Rec	Yds	Avg	Lng	TD
1988	BUF	**2**	0	**3**	**55**	**18.3**	**26**	0
1991	NYJ	1	0	0	0	0.0	0	0
		3	0	3	55	18.3	26	0
