= Nate Odomes =

American football player (born 1965)

No. 37, 38
- Position: Cornerback

Personal information
- Born: August 25, 1965 (age 61); Columbus, Georgia, U.S.
- Listed height: 5 ft 10 in (1.78 m)
- Listed weight: 188 lb (85 kg)

Career information
- High school: Carver (Columbus)
- College: Wisconsin
- NFL draft: 1987: 2nd round, 29th overall pick

Career history
- Buffalo Bills (1987–1993); Seattle Seahawks (1994–1995); Atlanta Falcons (1996)

Awards and highlights
- Second-team All-Pro (1993); 2× Pro Bowl (1992, 1993); NFL interceptions co-leader (1993); PFWA All-Rookie Team (1987); Buffalo Bills 50th Anniversary Team; First-team All-Big Ten (1986)

Career NFL statistics
- Tackles: 383
- Interceptions: 26
- Forced fumbles: 9
- Stats at Pro Football Reference

Nathaniel Bernard Odomes (born August 25, 1965) is an American former professional football player who was a cornerback in the National Football League (NFL) for the Buffalo Bills (1987–1993), Seattle Seahawks (1994–1995), and the Atlanta Falcons (1996). Before his NFL career, he played college football for the Wisconsin Badgers, returning 36 punts for 359 yards and intercepting nine passes. His seven interceptions in the 1986 season led the Big Ten Conference.

== Professional career ==
Pre-draft measurables
Height	Weight	Arm length	Hand span	40-yard dash	10-yard split	20-yard split	20-yard shuttle	Vertical jump	Broad jump	Bench press
5 ft 9 1/4 in (1.76 m)	188 lb (85 kg)	30 3/4 in (0.78 m)	9 in (0.23 m)	4.43 s	1.57 s	2.54 s	4.30 s	33.5 in (0.85 m)	9 ft 11 in (3.02 m)	18 reps
All values from NFL Combine

He was selected by the Bills in the second round of the 1987 NFL draft.

Odomes was one of the top defensive backs in the NFL during the early 1990s, assisting the Bills to four consecutive Super Bowl appearances, and making the Pro Bowl twice (1992 and 1993). One of his more memorable plays was in a 1992 playoff game known as The Comeback, where he intercepted a pass from future Hall of Fame quarterback Warren Moon to set up Buffalo's game-winning field goal. In the following season, Odomes led the NFL with nine interceptions, and made a key interception in the second quarter of Super Bowl XXVIII to help his team build a 13–6 halftime lead (the team lost the game 30–13). His five postseason interceptions is still a franchise record.

After the 1993 season, Odomes signed with Seattle and spent two injury-plagued years with the Seahawks. He never suited up for Seattle. Before concluding his NFL career, he played one final season with the Atlanta Falcons in 1996. In his eight NFL seasons, Odomes intercepted 26 passes, which he returned for 224 yards and a touchdown. He also recorded 3 sacks and recovered 8 fumbles, returning them for 86 yards and 2 touchdowns.

== NFL career statistics ==
Legend
	Led the league
**Bold**	Career high

=== Regular season ===
Year	Team	Games		Tackles				Interceptions					Fumbles			
Year	Team	GP	GS	Comb	Solo	Ast	Sck	Int	Yds	Avg	Lng	TD	FF	FR	Yds	TD
1987	BUF	12	12	42	—	—	0.0	0	0	0.0	0	0	1	2	0	0
1988	BUF	**16**	**16**	44	—	—	0.0	1	0	0.0	0	0	1	0	0	0
1989	BUF	**16**	**16**	46	—	—	**1.0**	5	20	4.0	13	0	**3**	0	0	0
1990	BUF	**16**	**16**	42	—	—	0.0	1	0	0.0	0	0	2	**3**	**49**	**1**
1991	BUF	**16**	**16**	**76**	—	—	**1.0**	5	**120**	**24.0**	**48**	**1**	1	1	0	0
1992	BUF	**16**	**16**	63	—	—	**1.0**	5	19	3.8	10	0	0	1	0	0
1993	BUF	**16**	15	47	—	—	0.0	**9**	65	7.2	25	0	1	1	25	**1**
1994	SEA	Missed season due to injury														
1995	SEA	Missed season due to injury														
1996	ATL	7	4	23	**23**	0	0.0	0	0	0.0	0	0	0	0	0	0
Career		115	111	383	23	0	3.0	26	224	8.6	48	1	9	8	86	2

=== Postseason ===
Year	Team	Games		Tackles				Interceptions					Fumbles			
Year	Team	GP	GS	Comb	Solo	Ast	Sck	Int	Yds	Avg	Lng	TD	FF	FR	Yds	TD
1988	BUF	2	2	0	—	—	0.0	0	0	0.0	0	0	0	0	0	0
1989	BUF	1	1	0	—	—	0.0	0	0	0.0	0	0	0	0	0	0
1990	BUF	3	3	**3**	**3**	—	0.0	**2**	18	9.0	9	0	0	0	0	0
1991	BUF	3	3	**3**	**3**	—	0.0	0	0	0.0	0	0	0	0	0	0
1992	BUF	4	4	**3**	**3**	—	0.0	**2**	3	1.5	2	0	**1**	**1**	0	0
1993	BUF	3	3	2	2	—	0.0	1	**41**	**41.0**	**41**	0	0	0	0	0
Career		16	16	11	11	—	0.0	5	62	12.4	41	0	1	1	0	0
