= Thurman Thomas =

American football player (born 1966)

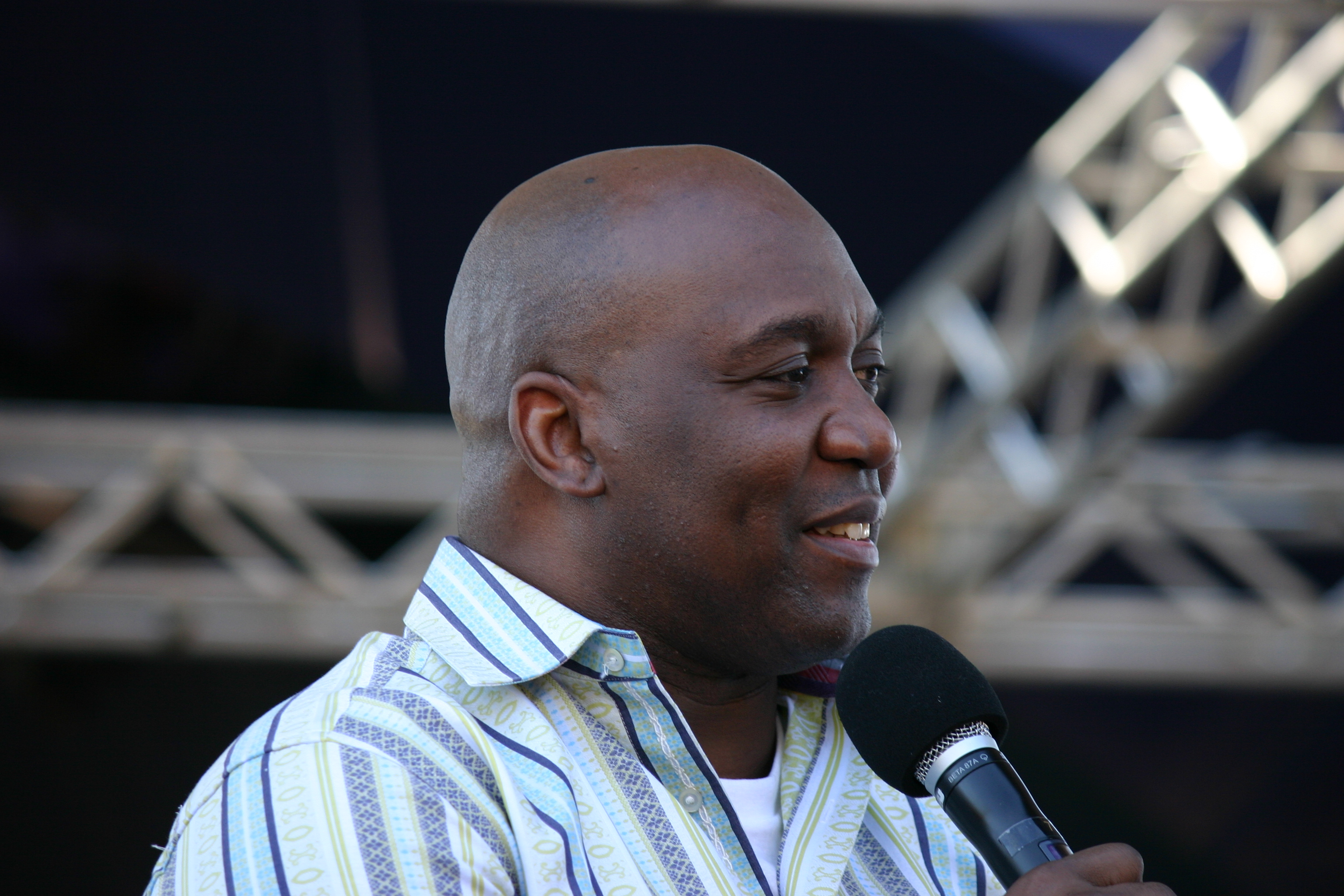
- Thomas at ESPN The Weekend in 2010

No. 34
- Position: Running back

Personal information
- Born: May 16, 1966 (age 60); Houston, Texas, U.S.
- Listed height: 5 ft 10 in (1.78 m)
- Listed weight: 200 lb (91 kg)

Career information
- High school: Willowridge (Houston)
- College: Oklahoma State (1984–1987)
- NFL draft: 1988: 2nd round, 40th overall pick

Career history
- Buffalo Bills (1988–1999); Miami Dolphins (2000)

Awards and highlights
- NFL Most Valuable Player (1991); NFL Offensive Player of the Year (1991); 2× First-team All-Pro (1990, 1991); 3× Second-team All-Pro (1989, 1992, 1993); 5× Pro Bowl (1989–1993); NFL 1990s All-Decade Team; Buffalo Bills Wall of Fame; Buffalo Bills 50th Anniversary Team; Buffalo Bills No. 34 retired; Consensus All-American (1985); First-team All-American (1987); 2× Big Eight Offensive Player of the Year (1985, 1987); 3× First-team All-Big Eight (1985, 1986, 1987); Oklahoma State Cowboys No. 34 retired

Career NFL statistics
- Rushing yards: 12,074
- Rushing average: 4.2
- Rushing touchdowns: 65
- Receptions: 472
- Receiving yards: 4,458
- Receiving touchdowns: 23
- Stats at Pro Football Reference
- Pro Football Hall of Fame
- College Football Hall of Fame

Thurman Lee Thomas (born May 16, 1966) is an American former professional football running back who played in the National Football League (NFL) for 13 seasons, primarily with the Buffalo Bills. He played college football for the Oklahoma State Cowboys, earning All-American honors twice. Thomas was selected by the Bills in the second round of the 1988 NFL draft, where he spent all but one season of his professional career. In his final season, he was a member of the Miami Dolphins.

During his 12 seasons with the Bills, Thomas established himself as a central contributor of the Bills "K-Gun" offense that utilized no-huddle shotgun formations. He was named NFL MVP in 1991, in addition to receiving five Pro Bowl and two first-team All-Pro selections. Thomas' efforts helped his team make a record four consecutive Super Bowl appearances from 1991 to 1994, although the Bills lost each game. He was inducted to the Pro Football Hall of Fame in 2007, the College Football Hall of Fame in 2008, and the National High School Hall of Fame in 2022.

== Early life ==
Thomas was born in Houston, Texas. He grew up playing football on the Missouri City Junior High School (now Missouri City Middle School) and Willowridge High School teams. During the 1982–83 season, Thomas led the Willowridge football team to a Texas Class 4A State Title. He formerly resided in the Willow Park II subdivision, located southeast of the Fort Bend Tollway and Beltway 8.

== College career ==
Thomas attended college at Oklahoma State University, where he was an upperclassman teammate of running back Barry Sanders. He had 897 rushes for 4,595 yards, 43 touchdowns, 5,146 total yards, and 21 100-yard rushing games for the Cowboys. He was also a Heisman Trophy candidate in his senior year, finishing seventh in voting. He was a first team selection on the College Football All-America Team in 1985 and 1987.

Thomas led the Big Eight Conference in rushing and scoring in 1985 and 1987 and was voted the conference's Offensive Player of the Year both seasons. Thurman Thomas starred as a sophomore in 1985 when he posted 1,553 yards rushing, fourth best in the country. Between his sophomore and junior seasons he suffered a tear to his ACL in his left knee, missing some games during the 1986 season. He bounced back his senior season, rushing for 1,613 yards and finishing third nationally in rushing. From 1984 to 1987, Thomas carried the ball a remarkable 897 times for the Cowboys, the most rushing attempts in a career in Oklahoma State history.

In the 1987 Sun Bowl, Thomas ran for 157 yards and four touchdowns in the 35–33 comeback victory over West Virginia, keeping sophomore Barry Sanders on the sidelines for the majority of the game. Thomas left OSU as the school's all-time leading rusher and his number 34 (chosen in honor of Earl Campbell and Walter Payton) is one of only three jerseys retired at Oklahoma State.

In 2008, Thomas was inducted to the College Football Hall of Fame.

== Professional career ==
Pre-draft measurables
Height	Weight	Hand span	40-yard dash	10-yard split	20-yard split	20-yard shuttle	Vertical jump	Broad jump	Bench press
5 ft 9 7/8 in (1.77 m)	198 lb (90 kg)	8 3/4 in (0.22 m)	4.47 s	1.61 s	2.59 s	4.21 s	33.0 in (0.84 m)	9 ft 6 in (2.90 m)	13 reps
All values from NFL Combine

=== Buffalo Bills ===
A knee injury damaged Thomas's certain first round pick status and caused him to slip into second round (40th overall) of the 1988 NFL draft by the Buffalo Bills, their first choice in the draft. Seven other running backs were drafted ahead of him. Thomas is well known as part of the offense that included Jim Kelly and Andre Reed, which led the Bills to four straight Super Bowl appearances.

Thomas was the AFC rushing leader in three seasons (1990, 1991, and 1993). In the first three seasons of his career, Thomas had a total of twelve games with at least 100 yards rushing. The Bills won every one of those games. In 1989 and 1990, his combined total yards from scrimmage was 3,742. This was more than 200 yards better than any other player in the NFL. He was voted to the All-Pro team in 1990 and 1991, was selected to five straight Pro Bowls from 1989 to 1993 and was named NFL's Most Valuable Player in 1991, after becoming the eleventh player in NFL history to finish a season with over 2,000 all-purpose yards. Currently, he is fifteenth on the NFL all-time list for most rushing yards in a career.

Thomas currently holds the all-time Buffalo Bills rushing record with 11,938 yards and the team record for yards from scrimmage with 16,279 over twelve seasons. He is also fourth overall in team scoring. Overall, Thomas finished his thirteen seasons (the last one was spent in Miami) with 12,074 rushing yards, 472 receptions for 4,458 yards, and 88 touchdowns (65 rushing and 23 receiving) with 16,532 total yards from scrimmage. His 65 rushing touchdowns was the most by a Bill in team history until he was passed by Josh Allen in 2025.

Thomas is the only player in NFL history to lead the league in total yards from scrimmage for four consecutive seasons. He is one of only eight running backs to have over 400 receptions and 10,000 yards rushing. Walter Payton, Marshall Faulk, Marcus Allen, Ricky Watters, Tiki Barber, Warrick Dunn and LaDainian Tomlinson are the other six. Thomas is also one of five running backs to have rushed for over 1,000 yards in eight consecutive seasons along with Curtis Martin, Barry Sanders, Emmitt Smith and LaDainian Tomlinson.

Thomas also set NFL playoff records with the most career points (126), touchdowns (21), and consecutive playoff games with a touchdown (nine). Overall, he rushed for 1,442 yards and caught 76 passes for 672 yards in his 21 postseason games. In a 1989 playoff loss to the Cleveland Browns, Thomas recorded thirteen receptions for 150 yards and two touchdowns, which was a postseason record for receptions by a running back and tied tight end Kellen Winslow's record for most receptions in a playoff game (the receptions record was not surpassed until 2012). At the time of his retirement, his 76 postseason receptions ranked him fourth all time, and to this day he remains the only running back among the NFL's top ten leaders in that category.

==== Super Bowl XXV ====
Thomas had an outstanding performance in Super Bowl XXV, rushing for 135 yards and a touchdown, while also catching five passes for 55 yards. The Bills lost the game 20-19 when kicker Scott Norwood missed a 47-yard field goal attempt with eight seconds remaining.

Some fans and sports writers, such as Sports Illustrated writer Paul Zimmerman, have argued that Thomas had the best performance of the game, so therefore he should have won the MVP award even though his team lost. He had far more yards and catches than New York Giants running back Ottis Anderson, who won the MVP.

His performances in the Bills other postseason games that year were also superb. He rushed for a total of 255 yards, caught eight passes for 99 yards, and scored three touchdowns in their two playoff games prior to the Super Bowl.

==== Super Bowl XXVI ====
Thomas is noted for a mishap in Super Bowl XXVI. Thomas had a pre-game ritual where he placed his helmet at the 34-yard line. His helmet was moved in order for the stage to be set up for Harry Connick, Jr. to perform the national anthem. A trainer eventually found the helmet, but by then Thomas had missed Buffalo's first two offensive plays to backup running back Kenneth Davis . He went on to gain just thirteen rushing yards and a touchdown on ten carries. He also caught four passes for 27 yards. On August 8, 2009, during teammate Bruce Smith's Hall of Fame induction speech, while he was acknowledging his relationship with Thomas, Smith proclaimed "I hid your helmet!" Following the ceremony on NFL Total Access, Smith indicated this was merely a joke.

==== Super Bowl XXVII ====
Thomas scored the first points of the game for his team on a two-yard touchdown run, but was limited to just nineteen rushing yards on eleven carries and four receptions for ten yards in Buffalo's 52–17 loss to the Dallas Cowboys. Thomas was still recovering from a hip injury he suffered in the first game of the postseason. As a result, running back Kenneth Davis got the majority of carries in the game. Thomas also committed a costly fumble that was converted into a Dallas touchdown.

==== Super Bowl XXVIII ====
Thomas had another disappointing Super Bowl performance in this game, which the Bills lost to the Cowboys 30–13. He scored the only touchdown of the game for his team, but was limited to just 37 rushing yards on sixteen carries. He was a reliable target as a receiver out of the backfield, catching seven passes for 52 yards but he lost two fumbles that led to ten Dallas points.

=== Miami Dolphins ===
Thomas signed with the Miami Dolphins during the 2000 off-season, after the Bills had released him to clear space under the salary cap. He suffered a knee injury on November 12, 2000, against the San Diego Chargers which ended his NFL career. In his only season with the Dolphins, Thomas ran for 136 yards on 28 carries and no rushing touchdowns while having sixteen receptions for 117 yards and one receiving touchdown in nine games.

=== Retirement, Pro Football Hall of Fame ===
After deciding to retire, Thomas signed a ceremonial one-day contract on February 27, 2001, with the Bills.

Thurman Thomas was first eligible for induction into the Pro Football Hall of Fame in 2006. In that year, he made it to the list of ten finalists, but was not one of the six players elected to the Hall that year. He was selected on February 3, 2007, to be inducted into the Hall of Fame. Thomas joined his former quarterback Jim Kelly and wide receiver James Lofton in the Hall of Fame.

Thomas, Steve Tasker, Andre Reed, Bruce Smith, Don Beebe, and Jim Kelly were the subject of the 30 for 30 film, Four Falls of Buffalo.

His jersey number, 34, was retired by the Bills on national TV on Monday October 29, 2018 in honor of his achievements.

== NFL career statistics ==
Legend
	AP NFL MVP & OPOTY
	Led the league
**Bold**	Career high

=== Regular season ===
Year	Team	Games		Rushing							Receiving							Fum
Year	Team	GP	GS	Att	Yds	Avg	Lng	TD	Y/G	A/G	Rec	Yds	Avg	Lng	TD	Y/G	R/G	Fum
1988	BUF	15	15	207	881	4.3	37	2	58.7	13.8	18	208	11.6	34	0	13.9	1.2	**9**
1989	BUF	16	16	298	1,244	4.2	38	6	77.8	18.6	60	**669**	11.2	**74**	**6**	**41.8**	3.8	7
1990	BUF	16	16	271	1,297	4.8	**80**	**11**	81.1	16.9	49	532	10.9	63	2	33.3	3.1	6
1991	BUF	15	15	288	1,407	**4.9**	33	7	**93.8**	19.2	**62**	631	10.2	50	5	42.1	**4.1**	5
1992	BUF	16	16	312	**1,487**	4.8	44	9	92.9	19.5	58	626	10.8	43	3	39.1	3.6	6
1993	BUF	16	16	**355**	1,315	3.7	27	6	82.2	**22.2**	48	387	8.1	37	0	24.2	3.0	6
1994	BUF	15	15	287	1,093	3.8	29	7	72.9	19.1	50	349	7.0	28	2	23.3	3.3	1
1995	BUF	14	14	267	1,005	3.8	49	6	71.8	19.1	26	220	8.5	60	2	15.7	1.9	6
1996	BUF	15	15	281	1,033	3.7	36	8	68.9	18.7	26	254	9.8	69	0	16.9	1.7	1
1997	BUF	16	16	154	643	4.2	24	1	40.2	9.6	30	208	6.9	30	0	13.0	1.9	2
1998	BUF	14	3	93	381	4.1	17	2	27.2	6.6	26	220	8.5	26	1	15.7	1.9	0
1999	BUF	5	3	36	152	4.2	31	0	30.4	7.2	3	37	**12.3**	23	1	7.4	0.6	0
2000	MIA	9	0	28	136	**4.9**	25	0	15.1	3.1	16	117	7.3	15	1	13.0	1.8	1
Career		182	160	2,877	12,074	4.2	80	65	66.3	15.8	472	4,458	9.4	74	23	24.5	2.6	50

=== Playoffs ===
Year	Team	Games		Rushing							Receiving							Fum
Year	Team	GP	GS	Att	Yds	Avg	Lng	TD	Y/G	A/G	Rec	Yds	Avg	Lng	TD	Y/G	R/G	Fum
1988	BUF	2	2	11	81	**7.4**	**40**	1	40.5	5.5	—	—	—	—	0	—	—	0
1989	BUF	1	1	10	27	2.7	7	0	27.0	10.0	13	150	11.5	**27**	**2**	**150.0**	**13.0**	0
1990	BUF	3	3	**72**	**390**	5.4	31	4	**130.0**	**24.0**	13	**154**	**11.8**	20	0	51.3	4.3	**3**
1991	BUF	3	2	58	185	3.2	19	1	61.7	19.3	11	63	5.7	8	0	21.0	3.7	0
1992	BUF	4	4	61	195	3.2	24	1	48.8	15.3	14	102	7.3	19	1	25.5	3.5	2
1993	BUF	3	3	67	267	4.2	33	**5**	89.0	21.0	**15**	122	8.1	24	0	40.7	5.0	2
1995	BUF	2	2	38	204	5.4	32	2	102.0	19.0	6	54	9.0	18	1	27.0	3.0	2
1996	BUF	1	1	14	50	3.6	14	1	50.0	14.0	3	24	8.0	10	1	24.0	3.0	0
1998	BUF	1	0	7	33	4.7	12	1	33.0	7.0	1	3	3.0	3	0	3.0	1.0	0
1999	BUF	1	1	5	10	2.0	9	0	10.0	5.0	—	—	—	—	0	—	—	0
Career		21	19	339	1,442	4.3	40	16	68.7	16.1	76	672	8.8	27	5	32.0	3.6	9

== Personal life ==
Thomas is married to Patti Mariacher, who is from Buffalo and was on the Oklahoma State University golf team. They have four children, Olivia, Angel, Annika, and Thurman III.

He is involved with several business enterprises including sports, energy, telecommunications and construction. He was appointed as vice chair of the New York State Tourism Advisory Council in 2014.

Thomas has been involved in community issues since early in his career, establishing the Thurman Thomas Foundation in 1992. He has talked about mental health and the effects of concussions suffered during his football career.
