= Sean Dowling =

American football player (born 1965)

No. 71
- Positions: Guard, tackle

Personal information
- Born: February 19, 1963 (age 63); New York, New York, U.S.
- Listed height: 6 ft 4 in (1.93 m)
- Listed weight: 280 lb (127 kg)

Career information
- High school: Oyster Bay (Oyster Bay, New York)
- College: C. W. Post
- NFL draft: 1987: undrafted

Career history
- Buffalo Bills (1987)

Career NFL statistics
- Games played: 3
- Games started: 3
- Stats at Pro Football Reference

Sean Dowling (born February 19, 1963) is an American former professional football player who was a tackle for the Buffalo Bills of the National Football League (NFL). He played college football for the C. W. Post Pioneers.
