= Jack Bravyak =

American football player (born 1959)

Profile
- Position: Defensive end

Personal information
- Born: September 10, 1959 (age 67); Sayre, Pennsylvania, U.S.
- Listed height: 6 ft 3 in (1.91 m)
- Listed weight: 255 lb (116 kg)

Career information
- College: Temple

Career history
- Buffalo Bills (1987)

Career statistics
- Games: 1
- Stats at Pro Football Reference

John Bravyak (born September 10, 1959) is an American former professional football player who was a defensive end for the Buffalo Bills of the National Football League (NFL) in 1987. He played college football for the Temple Owls.
