= Joe McGrail =

American football player (born 1964)

No. 74
- Position: Nose tackle

Personal information
- Born: June 6, 1964 (age 62); Philadelphia, Pennsylvania, U.S.
- Listed height: 6 ft 3 in (1.91 m)
- Listed weight: 280 lb (127 kg)

Career information
- High school: Pope Paul VI (Haddonfield, New Jersey)
- College: Delaware
- NFL draft: 1987: 12th round, 311th overall pick

Career history
- Buffalo Bills (1987)

Career NFL statistics
- Games played: 2
- Stats at Pro Football Reference

Joseph John McGrail (born June 6, 1964) is an American former professional football player who was a nose tackle for one season in the National Football League (NFL). After playing college football for the Delaware Fightin' Blue Hens, he was selected by the Buffalo Bills in the 12th round of the 1987 NFL draft. He played in two games for the Bills in 1987.
