= Joe Chetti =

American football player (born 1963)

No. 46
- Position: Running back

Personal information
- Born: November 19, 1963 (age 62); Bay Shore, New York, U.S.
- Listed height: 5 ft 9 in (1.75 m)
- Listed weight: 205 lb (93 kg)

Career information
- High school: North Babylon (NY)
- College: C. W. Post
- NFL draft: 1987: undrafted

Career history
- Buffalo Bills (1987)

Career NFL statistics
- Games played: 2
- Receptions: 1
- Receiving Yards: 9
- Stats at Pro Football Reference

Joseph Salvatore Chetti is an American former professional football player who was a running back for one season with the Buffalo Bills of the National Football League (NFL) in 1987. He played college football for the C. W. Post Pioneers. He was a replacement player for the Bills.
