= Mark Miller (quarterback, born 1962) =

American football player (born 1962)

No. 10
- Position: Quarterback

Personal information
- Born: November 6, 1962 (age 64); Grand Junction, Colorado, U.S.
- Listed height: 6 ft 2 in (1.88 m)
- Listed weight: 210 lb (95 kg)

Career information
- High school: Grand Junction
- College: Colorado Mesa
- NFL draft: 1986: undrafted

Career history
- Denver Broncos (1986)*; Buffalo Bills (1987)
- * Offseason or practice squad member only
- Stats at Pro Football Reference

Mark Allen Miller (born November 6, 1962) is an American former professional football player who was a quarterback for the Buffalo Bills of the National Football League (NFL). He played college football for the Colorado Mesa Mavericks.

Season	Position	Attempts	Completions	Comp. %	Yards	TD	Int
1987	QB	3	1	33.3%	9	0	1
