= Bob LeBlanc =

American gridiron football player (born 1962)

No. 50
- Position: Linebacker

Personal information
- Born: November 5, 1962 (age 64); Panama City, Florida, U.S.
- Listed height: 6 ft 2 in (1.88 m)
- Listed weight: 243 lb (110 kg)

Career information
- High school: Shawnee Mission South (KS)
- College: Coffeyville CC; Elon
- NFL draft: 1985: undrafted

Career history
- Philadelphia Stars USFL Year 1985; Dallas Cowboys (1986)*; Calgary Stampeders (1987)*; Buffalo Bills (1987); New York Jets (1988)
- * Offseason or practice squad member only

Career NFL statistics
- Games played: 18
- Games started: 3
- Stats at Pro Football Reference

Robert Leron LeBlanc (born November 5, 1962) is an American former professional football player who was a linebacker for four seasons in the National Football League (NFL) for the Dallas Cowboys, Buffalo Bills and New York Jets. He played college football at Coffeyville Community College and Elon.

== Early life and education ==
LeBlanc was born on November 5, 1962, in Panama City, Florida. He attended Shawnee Mission South High School in Overland Park, Kansas, graduating in c. 1983. He first played college football for Coffeyville Community College, spending the 1981 and 1982 seasons there before transferring to Elon University. He played two years there, from 1984 to 1985, at linebacker, before graduating in 1985.

== Professional career ==
After going unselected in the 1985 NFL draft, LeBlanc was signed as an undrafted free agent by the Dallas Cowboys, only to be released when he failed a physical test.

LeBlanc moved to the Canadian Football League (CFL) later in the year, being signed by the Calgary Stampeders to their practice roster on August 14.

He left the Stampeders during the 1987 NFL strike to be signed by the Buffalo Bills. He was named starter for their game against the Indianapolis Colts, and made his professional debut in the 47–6 loss. He appeared in a total of three games, each as a starter, before being released.

LeBlanc was signed by the New York Jets in 1988, but was placed on season-ending injured reserve.
