= Cris D'Annunzio =

American football player (born 1965)

Cris D'Anunnzio (Chip Nuzzo)
No. 40
- Position: Defensive back

Personal information
- Born: July 26, 1965 (age 61); Olean, New York, U.S.
- Listed height: 5 ft 11 in (1.80 m)
- Listed weight: 190 lb (86 kg)

Career information
- High school: Corry Area
- College: Princeton
- NFL draft: 1987: undrafted

Career history
- Buffalo Bills (1987)

Career NFL statistics
- Games played: 3
- Stats at Pro Football Reference

Cris D'Annunzio (born Anthony Chip Nuzzo, July 26, 1965) is an American actor and former professional football defensive back who played for the Buffalo Bills of the National Football League (NFL). He played college football at Princeton University. After his football career, he became an actor and writer, and has had roles in shows including Seinfeld, Law & Order, and Without a Trace, as well as films including American Gangster and Across the Universe.
