= Matt Jaworski =

American football player (born 1967)

No. 59, 95
- Position: Linebacker

Personal information
- Born: October 23, 1967 (age 59); Blasdell, New York, U.S.
- Listed height: 6 ft 1 in (1.85 m)
- Listed weight: 227 lb (103 kg)

Career information
- High school: St. Francis
- College: Colgate
- NFL draft: 1989: undrafted

Career history
- Buffalo Bills (1989–1990)*; Indianapolis Colts (1991); Pittsburgh Steelers (1992)*; Sacramento Gold Miners (1994)
- * Offseason or practice squad member only
- Stats at Pro Football Reference

Matthew Joseph Jaworski (born October 23, 1967) is an American former football player who was a linebacker who played eight games with the Indianapolis Colts in 1991. He played college football for the Colgate Raiders.

== Life ==
Jaworski was born in 1967 in Blasdell, New York, and attended Colgate University.
