= Mike Panepinto =

American football player (born 1965)

No. 47
- Position: Running back

Personal information
- Born: November 17, 1965 (age 60); Buffalo, New York, U.S.
- Listed height: 5 ft 7 in (1.70 m)
- Listed weight: 180 lb (82 kg)

Career information
- High school: Kenmore West (Tonawanda, New York)
- College: Canisius
- NFL draft: 1987: undrafted

Career history
- Buffalo Bills (1987)
- Stats at Pro Football Reference

Michael Gino Panepinto (born November 17, 1965) is an American former professional football running back in the National Football League (NFL). He attended Canisius College. He played with the Buffalo Bills in 1987.
