= Chris Hale =

American football player (born 1966)

No. 26
- Position: Defensive back

Personal information
- Born: January 4, 1966 (age 60); Monrovia, California, U.S.
- Listed height: 5 ft 7 in (1.70 m)
- Listed weight: 161 lb (73 kg)

Career information
- High school: Monrovia
- College: USC
- NFL draft: 1989: 7th round, 193rd overall pick

Career history
- Buffalo Bills (1989–1992); Denver Broncos (1993)

Career NFL statistics
- Fumble recoveries: 3
- Interceptions: 1
- Safeties: 1
- Stats at Pro Football Reference

Christopher Hale (born January 4, 1966) is an American former professional football player who was a defensive back in the National Football League (NFL).

== Playing career ==
Hale played college football for the Nebraska Cornhuskers and the USC Trojans.

Pre-draft measurables
Height	Weight	40-yard dash	10-yard split	20-yard split	20-yard shuttle	Vertical jump	Broad jump	Bench press
5 ft 7 5/8 in (1.72 m)	161 lb (73 kg)	4.52 s	1.56 s	2.67 s	4.11 s	40.5 in (1.03 m)	10 ft 9 in (3.28 m)	8 reps
All values from NFL Combine

He was selected by the Buffalo Bills in the seventh round (193rd overall) of the 1989 NFL draft. He played four seasons for the Buffalo Bills.
