= Kerry Porter =

American football player (born 1964)

No. 30, 31
- Position: Running back

Personal information
- Born: September 23, 1964 (age 62); Vicenza, Italy
- Listed height: 6 ft 1 in (1.85 m)
- Listed weight: 210 lb (95 kg)

Career information
- High school: Great Falls (Great Falls, Montana, U.S.)
- College: Washington State
- NFL draft: 1987: 7th round, 171st overall pick

Career history
- Buffalo Bills (1987); Los Angeles Raiders (1989); Denver Broncos (1990); Houston Oilers (1991)*
- * Offseason or practice squad member only

Awards and highlights
- First-team All-Pac-10 (1983); Second-team All-Pac-10 (1986)

Career NFL statistics
- Rushing yards: 57
- Rushing average: 3.6
- Receptions: 4
- Receiving yards: 44
- Stats at Pro Football Reference

Kerry Porter (born September 23, 1964) is an Italian-born former professional football running back. He played for the Buffalo Bills in 1987, the Oakland Raiders in 1989 and for the Denver Broncos in 1990.

Pre-draft measurables
Height	Weight	Arm length	Hand span	40-yard dash	10-yard split	20-yard split	20-yard shuttle	Vertical jump	Broad jump	Bench press
6 ft 1 5/8 in (1.87 m)	209 lb (95 kg)	31 3/4 in (0.81 m)	9 1/2 in (0.24 m)	4.47 s	1.67 s	2.61 s	4.18 s	32.5 in (0.83 m)	9 ft 10 in (3.00 m)	9 reps
All values from NFL Combine

He was selected by the Bills in the seventh round of the 1987 NFL draft.
