= Scott Schankweiler =

American football player (born 1963)

No. 52
- Position: Linebacker

Personal information
- Born: October 15, 1963 (age 63); Sunbury, Pennsylvania, U.S.
- Listed height: 6 ft 0 in (1.83 m)
- Listed weight: 235 lb (107 kg)

Career information
- High school: Cedar Cliff (Camp Hill, Pennsylvania)
- College: Maryland
- NFL draft: 1986: undrafted

Career history
- St. Louis Cardinals (1986)*; Buffalo Bills (1987)
- * Offseason or practice squad member only
- Stats at Pro Football Reference

Scott Brian Schankweiler (born October 15, 1963) is an American former professional football player who was a linebacker for the Buffalo Bills of the National Football League (NFL). He played college football for the Maryland Terrapins.

== Early life ==
Schankweiler was born on October 15, 1963, in Sunbury, Pennsylvania, to parents Pat and Glenn. While he was born in Sunbury, he was raised in Shamokin and Pottsville before the family moved to Camp Hill, Pennsylvania. Schankweiler began playing football at the age of nine with the West Shore Vikings in Camp Hill. He began playing as a guard before switching to quarterback.

== High school and college career ==
Schankweiler was a multisport athlete at Cedar Cliff High School, competing in football, track, and basketball. In his senior year, Schankweiler was named to the Associated Press' 1980 All-State Football team for his defensive back efforts. Schankweiler helped the Colts compile a 19-1 record in his final two years of schooling and was heavily recruited to play college football. While he was originally recruited to play for Pennsylvania State, he was ultimately rejected. Schankweiler visited North Carolina State and received offers from other colleges before signing with the University of Maryland, College Park.

Shankweiler played his freshman season as a safety before redshirting the 1982 season to mature. He began the 1983 season as a reserve player before sharing the outside linebacker position with a senior teammate. Shankweiler was named Maryland's defensives MVP following their Cherry Bowl win over the Syracuse Orange. In his fourth and fifth years at Maryland, Shankweiler became the team's outside linebacker starter.

== Professional ==
After going undrafted in the 1986 NFL draft, Schankweiler signed a professional contract as a free agent with the St. Louis Cardinals. After atrending their minicamp, Schankweiler was released by the team. After being cut, Schankweiler visited his friend Stan Gelbaugh at the Buffalo Bills' camp, who then offered him a chance to tryout for the team. He initially declined because he felt he was not in good enough shape. He returned to the Bills in January at 230 pounds and signed a two-year contract with the team.
