= Queen Street Baptist Church =

Historic church in Virginia, US

- U.S. National Register of Historic Places
- Virginia Landmarks Register
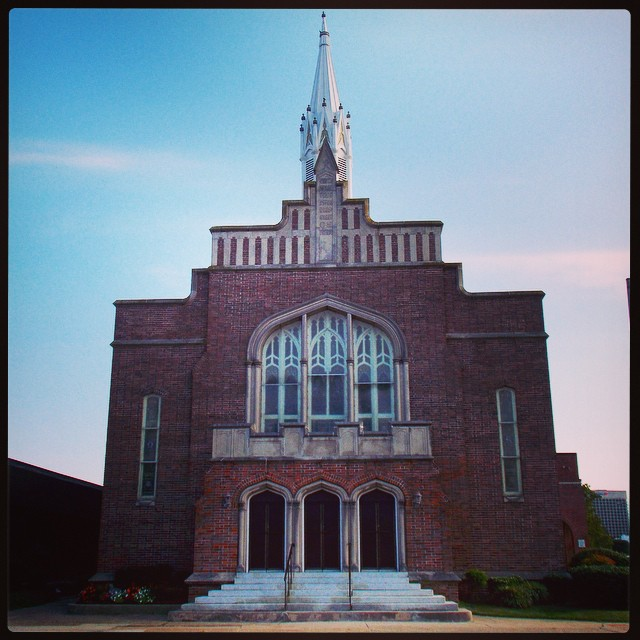

- Location within Virginia Location within the United States
- Location: 413 Brambleton Ave., Norfolk, Virginia
- Coordinates: 36°51′19″N 76°17′3″W
- Area: 1 acre (0.40 ha)
- Built: 1910
- Architect: Mitchell, Rossell Edward
- Architectural style: Late Gothic Revival
- NRHP reference No.: 06000141
- VLR No.: 122-0165

Significant dates
- Added to NRHP: March 15, 2006
- Designated VLR: December 7, 2005

Queen Street Baptist Church is a historic African-American Baptist church located at Norfolk, Virginia. It was built in 1910–1911, and is a rectangular one-story brick church in the Late Gothic Revival style. The façade and side elevations have Gothic pointed arch windows and the church is topped by a spire that rests atop the roof at the façade. An educational annex was built in 1952, and expanded in 1957. The Queen Street Baptist Church congregation dates to 1884.

It was listed on the National Register of Historic Places in 2006.
