= Walter Broughton =

American football player (born 1962)

No. 89, 81
- Position: Wide receiver

Personal information
- Born: October 20, 1962 (age 64); Brewton, Alabama
- Listed height: 5 ft 10 in (1.78 m)
- Listed weight: 180 lb (82 kg)

Career information
- High school: Brewton (AL) T. R. Miller
- College: Jacksonville State

Career history
- Michigan Panthers (1984); New Jersey Generals (1985); Buffalo Bills (1986–1988)
- Stats at Pro Football Reference

Walter Broughton (born October 20, 1962) is an American former football wide receiver. He played for the Buffalo Bills from 1986 to 1988.
