= John Hagy =

American football player (born 1965)

No. 49, 22
- Position: Safety

Personal information
- Born: December 9, 1965 (age 60); Okinawa, Japan
- Listed height: 5 ft 11 in (1.80 m)
- Listed weight: 190 lb (86 kg)

Career information
- High school: John Marshall (San Antonio, Texas, U.S)
- College: Texas
- NFL draft: 1988: 8th round, 204th overall pick

Career history
- Buffalo Bills (1988–1990); Houston Oilers (1991)*; Kansas City Chiefs (1992)*; Seattle Seahawks (1993)*
- * Offseason or practice squad member only

Awards and highlights
- First-team All-SWC (1987); 1987 Astro-Bluebonnet Bowl champion

Career NFL statistics
- Interceptions: 2
- Stats at Pro Football Reference

John Kevin Hagy (born December 9, 1965) is an American former professional football player who spent three seasons in the National Football League (NFL) with the Buffalo Bills as a defensive back from 1988 to 1990, including a trip to Super Bowl XXV. Prior to that he played for four seasons at the University of Texas where he was an All-American honorable mention and nicknamed "the Hitman".

== Early life ==
Hagy, the son of an Air Force master sergeant, was born in Okinawa, Japan.

== College career ==
Hagy played for Texas for four seasons as a safety and punt returner. During his senior year at Texas in 1987, Hagy was a team captain and earned All-Southwest Conference and All-American honorable mention honors as a safety; and he became the first UT defensive player to score touchdowns on a punt return and an interception return in the same game. He also helped the team to a win in the 1987 Astro-Bluebonnet Bowl.

== Professional career ==
Hagy was selected 204th overall by the Buffalo Bills in the eighth round of the 1988 NFL draft. In his first season he made a challenge for the starting free safety position, but suffered a season-ending knee injury in September. At the end of the 1990 season, in which he had all 11 of his starts, he played in Super Bowl XXV. The Bills lost in what would be his last game. In the spring of 1991, he was signed as a free agent by the Houston Oilers, but was released during training camp. Before the 1992 season, he was signed by the Kansas City Chiefs but was again cut before the season started. In 1993 he was again signed in the offseason and released before the season started, this time by the Seattle Seahawks and to the retired list.

Hagy appeared in a total of 28 career games, including 11 starts during which he recorded 2 interceptions for 23 yards.

After retiring from football, he returned to Austin and became a home builder.
