= Carl Byrum =

American football player (born 1963)

No. 35
- Position: Running back

Personal information
- Born: June 29, 1963 (age 63); Olive Branch, Mississippi, U.S.
- Listed height: 6 ft 0 in (1.83 m)
- Listed weight: 232 lb (105 kg)

Career information
- High school: Southaven (Southaven, Mississippi)
- College: Mississippi Valley State
- NFL draft: 1986: 5th round, 111th overall pick

Career history
- Buffalo Bills (1986–1988); Houston Oilers (1989)*; New York Jets (1990)
- * Offseason or practice squad member only

Career NFL statistics
- Rushing yards: 527
- Rushing average: 4
- Receptions: 18
- Receiving yards: 127
- Total touchdowns: 1
- Stats at Pro Football Reference

Carl Edward Byrum (born June 29, 1963) is an American former professional football player who was a running back for three seasons with the Buffalo Bills of the National Football League (NFL). He was selected by the Bills in the fifth round of the 1986 NFL draft. He played college football for the Mississippi Valley State Delta Devils.

== Early life ==
Carl Edward Byrum was born June 29, 1963, in Olive Branch, Mississippi. He attended Southaven High School in Southaven, Mississippi.

== College career ==
Byrum played at Mississippi Valley State University for the Delta Devils from 1982 to 1985. He was teammates with Jerry Rice under coach Archie Cooley. Carl was inducted into the Mississippi Valley State University Athletic Hall of Fame in 2006.

== Professional career ==
Byrum was selected by the Buffalo Bills of the NFL in the fifth round with the 111th overall pick in the 1986 NFL draft. He played in 41 games, starting twelve, for the Bills from 1986 to 1988, rushing for 527 yards on 132 carries. He also caught 18 passes for 127 yards and one touchdown. Byrum became a free agent after the 1988 season.

He signed with the Houston Oilers on April 1, 1989, and was released on August 30, 1989.

Byrum was signed by the New York Jets on March 19, 1990, and was released on September 18, 1990.

== Personal life ==
Byrum has spent time working as a welder and as an active member of the Buffalo Bills Alumni Association.
