= Flip Johnson =

American football player (born 1963)

Profile
- Position: Wide receiver

Personal information
- Born: July 13, 1963 (age 63); Cheek, Texas
- Listed height: 5 ft 10 in (1.78 m)
- Listed weight: 185 lb (84 kg)

Career information
- High school: Hamshire-Fannett (Hamshire, Texas)
- College: McNeese State University

Career history
- 1987–1989: Buffalo Bills
- Stats at Pro Football Reference

Fulton "Flip" Frederick Johnson (born July 13, 1963, in Cheek, Texas) is a retired American football player who played in the National Football League. He played for the Buffalo Bills as a wide receiver from 1988 to 1989.
