= Tony Brown (offensive lineman) =

American football player (1964–2010)

No. 68, 71
- Position: Offensive tackle

Personal information
- Born: July 11, 1964; Stamford, Connecticut, U.S.
- Died: June 19, 2010 (aged 45); Scottsdale, Arizona, U.S.
- Listed height: 6 ft 5 in (1.96 m)
- Listed weight: 285 lb (129 kg)

Career information
- High school: Stamford Catholic
- College: Pittsburgh
- NFL draft: 1986: undrafted

Career history
- New England Patriots (1986)*; Detroit Lions (1987)*; Buffalo Bills (1987–1989); Montreal Machine (1991)
- * Offseason or practice squad member only

Career NFL statistics
- Games played: 2
- Games started: 2
- Stats at Pro Football Reference

Antony Brester Brown Jr. (July 11, 1964 – June 19, 2010) is an American former professional football player who was a tackle for the Buffalo Bills of the National Football League (NFL). He also played for Montreal Machine in the (WLAF). He played college football for the Pittsburgh Panthers.
