= Jamie Mueller =

American football player (born 1964)

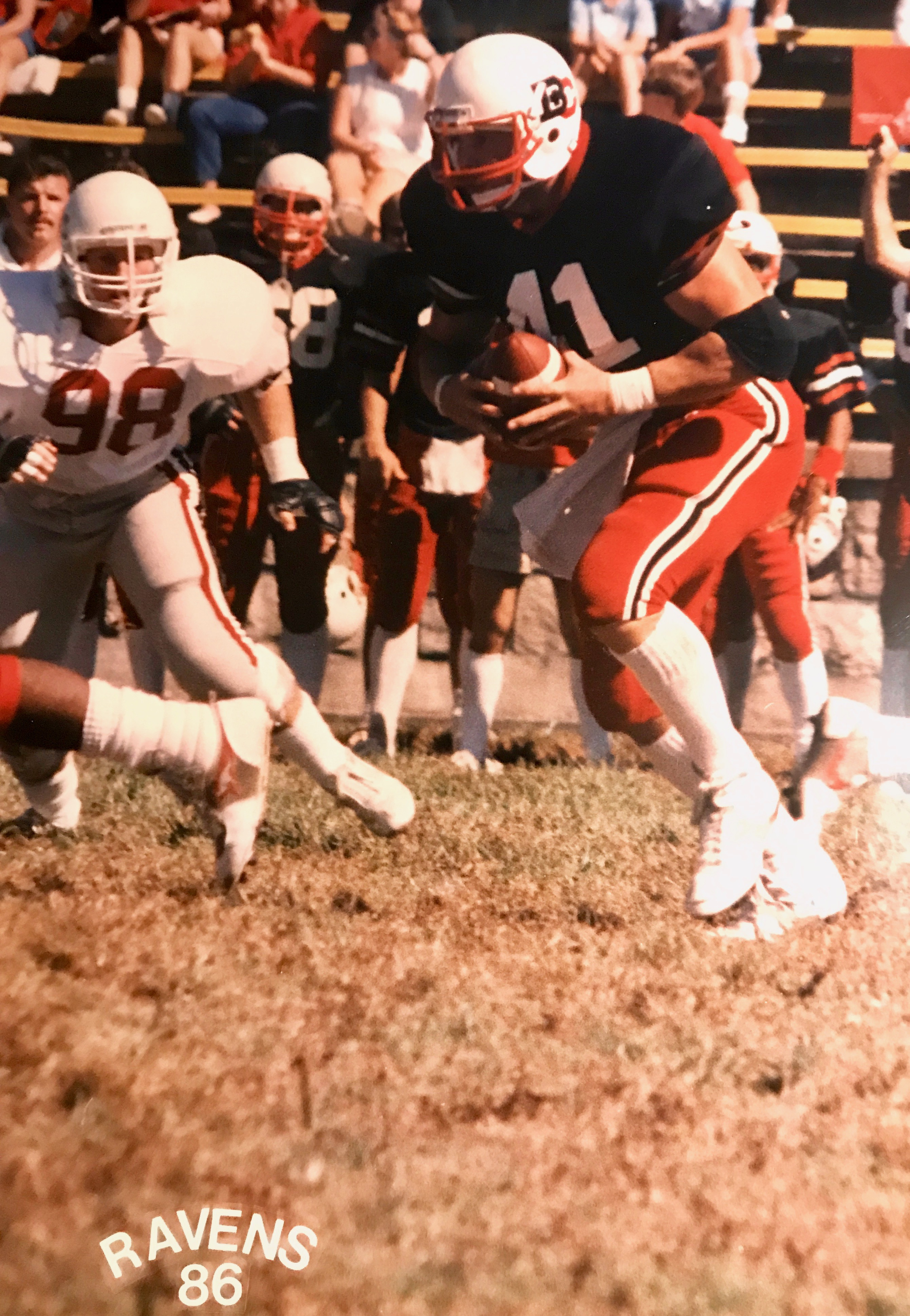
- Mueller in 1986

No. 39, 41
- Position: Running back

Personal information
- Born: October 4, 1964 (age 62); Cleveland, Ohio, U.S.
- Listed height: 6 ft 1 in (1.85 m)
- Listed weight: 225 lb (102 kg)

Career information
- High school: Fairview (Fairview Park, Ohio)
- College: Benedictine
- NFL draft: 1987: 3rd round, 78th overall pick

Career history
- Buffalo Bills (1987–1991)

Career NFL statistics
- Rushing yards: 901
- Rushing average: 3.8
- Rushing touchdowns: 4
- Receiving touchdowns: 1
- Stats at Pro Football Reference

Jamie F. Mueller (born October 4, 1964) is an American former professional football player who was a running back for the Buffalo Bills of the National Football League (NFL) from 1987 to 1991.

== College career ==
Mueller played college football at Benedictine College in Atchison, Kansas where he was a two-time NAIA All-American. He rushed for 4,038 yards, gained 4,221 total offensive yards, and scored 29 touchdowns in his four seasons.

== Professional career ==
Pre-draft measurables
Height	Weight	Arm length	Hand span	40-yard dash	10-yard split	20-yard split	20-yard shuttle	Vertical jump	Broad jump	Bench press
6 ft 1 in (1.85 m)	224 lb (102 kg)	31 1/4 in (0.79 m)	9 3/4 in (0.25 m)	4.61 s	1.63 s	2.73 s	3.99 s	33.0 in (0.84 m)	9 ft 9 in (2.97 m)	19 reps
All values from NFL Combine

Mueller was a third-round draft pick by the Buffalo Bills in the 1987 NFL draft. He played in 57 career games for Buffalo, with 38 starts. He had 238 rushes, accumulating 901 yards and 4 rushing touchdowns and 1 receiving TD. He started at fullback in Super Bowl XXV versus the New York Giants.

As a rookie, he was Buffalo's second-leading ground gainer and a leading special teams player every year. Mueller averaged 3.8 yards per attempt and 15.8 yards per game. His longest career run was 20 yards. With 4.2 attempts per game, Mueller also tacked up 28 receptions for 169 yards and a touchdown in his career, with a 6.0 yard per reception average. His longest career reception was of 30 yards.

One of Mueller's biggest plays came with him catching a last-minute touchdown versus the New York Jets in 1990, clinching home field throughout the playoffs.

He returned kicks for Buffalo on various occasions. In his career, he had 6 kick returns for 93 yards. His longest return was of 20 yards. Mueller had nine fumbles.

Mueller's career was ended by cervical spinal stenosis, a rare spinal condition that is a narrowing of the spinal canal.
