= Leon Seals =

American football player (born 1964)

No. 96, 97
- Position: Defensive end

Personal information
- Born: January 30, 1964 (age 62); New Orleans, Louisiana, U.S.
- Listed height: 6 ft 5 in (1.96 m)
- Listed weight: 265 lb (120 kg)

Career information
- High school: Scotlandville (Baton Rouge, Louisiana)
- College: Jackson State
- NFL draft: 1987: 4th round, 109th overall pick

Career history
- Buffalo Bills (1987–1991); Philadelphia Eagles (1992); New England Patriots (1993)*
- * Offseason or practice squad member only

Career NFL statistics
- Sacks: 14.5
- Fumble recoveries: 6
- Touchdowns: 1
- Stats at Pro Football Reference

Leon Seals Jr. (born January 30, 1964) is an American former professional football player who was a defensive end in the National Football League (NFL).

Seals played college football for the Jackson State Tigers in Jackson, Mississippi, earning the nickname "Dr. Sack".

Pre-draft measurables
Height	Weight	Arm length	Hand span	40-yard dash	10-yard split	20-yard split	20-yard shuttle	Vertical jump	Broad jump	Bench press
6 ft 4 7/8 in (1.95 m)	263 lb (119 kg)	32 1/4 in (0.82 m)	9 in (0.23 m)	5.05 s	1.79 s	2.96 s	4.79 s	22.5 in (0.57 m)	8 ft 5 in (2.57 m)	10 reps
All values from NFL Combine

Seals joined the Buffalo Bills after the 1987 NFL draft as a fourth-round draft choice (number 109 overall). He played with the Buffalo Bills from 1987 until 1991. He started at defensive end in Super Bowl XXV and XXVI. He retired after the 1992 season with the Philadelphia Eagles.

Seals currently lives in Clinton, Mississippi. He has served as a member of the Hinds County Sheriff's Department.
