= Bruce Mesner =

American football defensive and nose tackle (born 1964)

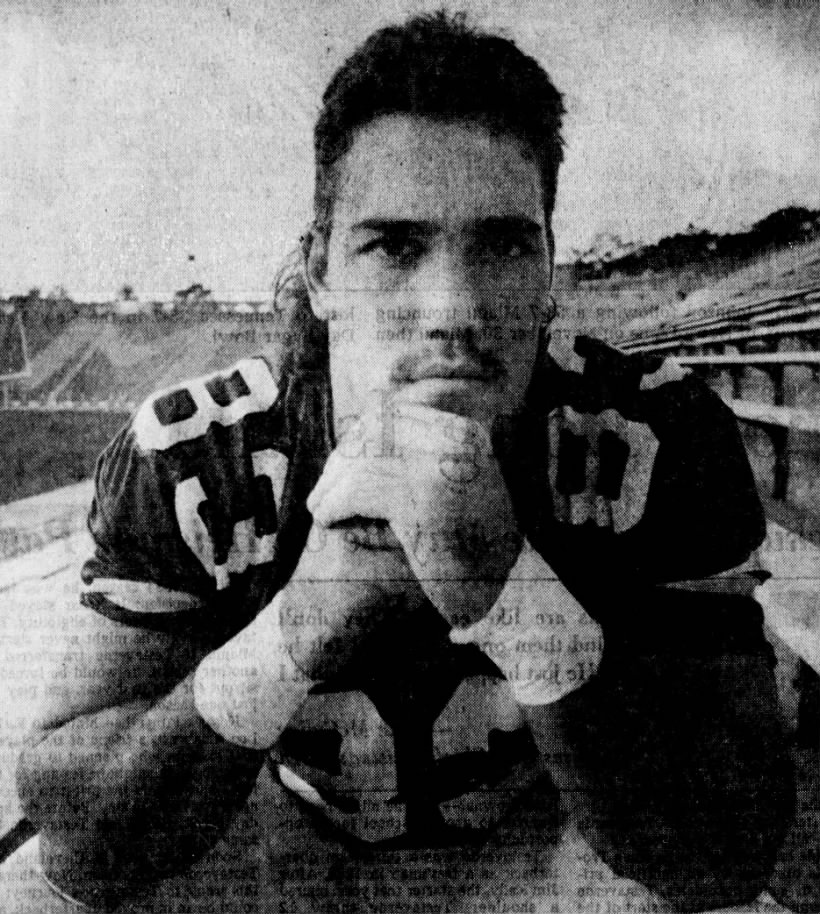
- Mesner in 1986

No. 74
- Positions: Defensive tackle Nose tackle

Personal information
- Born: March 21, 1964 (age 62); New York, New York, U.S.
- Listed height: 6 ft 5 in (1.96 m)
- Listed weight: 280 lb (127 kg)

Career information
- High school: Harrison
- College: Maryland (1983–1986)

Career history
- Buffalo Bills (1987)
- Stats at Pro Football Reference

Bruce M. Mesner (born March 21, 1964) is an American football defensive and nose tackle. He played for the Buffalo Bills of the National Football League (NFL).

== Life and career ==
Mesner was born in New York. His father was a college basketball player at the University of Alabama. He played high school football at Harrison High School in Harrison, New York. He then enrolled at the University of Maryland, College Park to play college football for the Maryland Terrapins. He was a four-year varsity letterman from 1983 to 1986, and was a three-year Coast Conference nose tackle.

Pre-draft measurables
Height	Weight	Arm length	Hand span	Bench press
6 ft 4 7/8 in (1.95 m)	279 lb (127 kg)	32 3/4 in (0.83 m)	8 1/2 in (0.22 m)	20 reps
All values from NFL Combine

In April 1987, Mesner was selected by the Buffalo Bills of the National Football League (NFL) in the 8th round of the 1987 NFL draft, and he joined the team in July 1987. He played in eleven games during the 1987 NFL season, but was exempted in September 1987. He was activated again in October 1987, and in August 1988, he was placed on the injured reserve list. He became a free agent in February 1990.
