= 1990 Buffalo Bills season =

31st season in franchise history, first Super Bowl appearance

- Owner: Ralph Wilson
- General manager: Bill Polian
- Head coach: Marv Levy
- Offensive coordinator: Ted Marchibroda
- Defensive coordinator: Walt Corey
- Home stadium: Rich Stadium

Results
- Record: 13–3
- Division place: 1st AFC East
- Playoffs: Won Divisional Playoffs (vs. Dolphins) 44–34; Won AFC Championship (vs. Raiders) 51–3; Lost Super Bowl XXV (vs. Giants) 19–20
- All-Pros: 5: RB Thurman Thomas (1st team); C Kent Hull (1st team); WR Andre Reed (2nd team); DT Bruce Smith (2nd team); ILB Shane Conlan (2nd team)
- Pro Bowlers: 10: QB Jim Kelly; RB Thurman Thomas; WR Andre Reed; C Kent Hull; OT Will Wolford; DT Bruce Smith; ILB Shane Conlan; OLB Cornelius Bennett; OLB Darryl Talley; ST Steve Tasker

The 1990 Buffalo Bills season was the 31st for the franchise and the 21st in the National Football League (NFL). The team finished the year with a record of 13 wins and 3 losses, and first in the American Football Conference (AFC) East division. They were 8–0 at home for the second time in their franchise history. On the road, the Bills were 5–3. Buffalo qualified for their first Super Bowl appearance, but lost 20–19 to the New York Giants after an infamous missed field goal by Scott Norwood in the game's closing seconds.

The Bills' offense was one of the best in the league; their 428 points (26.75 points per game) scored was first in the league, and since they only gave up 263 points (6th in the league), their point differential was 165 points (10.3 per game), which was the best in the NFL in 1990, as well as the best point-differential in franchise history. Buffalo's 48 offensive touchdowns (28 passing, 20 rushing) also led the league.

Defensive end Bruce Smith was named Associated Press Defensive Player of the Year for 1990, recording 101 tackles, four forced fumbles, and a career-high 19 sacks. The season was chronicled on October 2, 2008, for America's Game: The Missing Rings, as one of the five greatest NFL teams to never win the Super Bowl.

== Offseason ==
=== NFL draft ===
1990 Buffalo Bills draft
Round	Pick	Player	Position	College	Notes
1	16	James Williams	Cornerback	Fresno State	
2	42	Carwell Gardner	Fullback	Louisville	
3	69	Glenn Parker	Guard	Arizona	
4	100	Eddie Fuller	Running back	LSU	
6	154	John Nies	Punter	Arizona	
7	166	Brent Griffith	Guard	Minnesota–Duluth	
7	170	Brent Collins	Linebacker	Carson–Newman	
7	181	Fred DeRiggi	Defensive tackle	Syracuse	
8	208	Marvcus Patton	Linebacker	UCLA	
9	238	Clarkston Hines	Wide receiver	Duke	
10	265	Mike Lodish	Defensive tackle	UCLA	
11	292	Al Edwards	Wide receiver	Northwestern State	
Made roster

=== Undrafted free agents ===
1990 undrafted free agents of note
Player	Position	College
Dave Schnell	Quarterback	Indiana

== Personnel ==
=== Staff ===
1990 Buffalo Bills staff
Front office: President – Ralph Wilson; Vice president of administration/general manager – Bill Polian; Assistant general manager/director of pro personnel – Bob Ferguson; Director of player personnel – John Butler; Assistant director/collegiate scouting – A. J. Smith; Administrative assistant to the head coach – Chuck Lester; Head coaches: Vice president for football operations/head coach – Marv Levy; Offensive coaches: Offensive coordinator – Ted Marchibroda; Running backs – Elijah Pitts; Receivers – Nick Nicolau; Offensive quality control/tight ends – Don Lawrence; Offensive line – Tom Bresnahan	Defensive coaches: Defensive coordinator/linebackers – Walt Corey; Defensive line – Chuck Dickerson; Defensive backs – Dick Roach; Defensive quality control – Chuck Lester; Special teams coaches: Special teams – Bruce DeHaven; Strength and conditioning: Strength and conditioning coordinator – Rusty Jones

=== Roster ===
1990 Buffalo Bills roster
Quarterbacks: 7 Gale Gilbert; 12 Jim Kelly; 14 Frank Reich; Running backs: 23 Kenneth Davis; 35 Carwell Gardner FB; 41 Jamie Mueller FB; 30 Don Smith KR; 34 Thurman Thomas; Wide receivers: 85 Al Edwards KR/PR; 80 James Lofton; 83 Andre Reed; 89 Steve Tasker RS; 86 Vernon Turner; Tight ends: 84 Keith McKeller; 88 Pete Metzelaars; 87 Butch Rolle	Offensive linemen: 75 Howard Ballard T; 65 John Davis G; 59 Mitch Frerotte G; 67 Kent Hull C; 63 Adam Lingner C/LS; 74 Glenn Parker T; 51 Jim Ritcher G; 69 Will Wolford T; Defensive linemen: 92 Gary Baldinger DE/NT; 73 Mike Lodish NT; 94 Mark Pike DE; 96 Leon Seals DT; 78 Bruce Smith DE; 91 Jeff Wright NT	Linebackers: 54 Carlton Bailey OLB; 97 Cornelius Bennett ILB; 50 Ray Bentley ILB; 58 Shane Conlan ILB; 99 Hal Garner OLB; 57 Matt Monger OLB; 53 Marvcus Patton OLB; 56 Darryl Talley ILB; Defensive backs: 45 Dwight Drane SS; 49 John Hagy FS; 27 Cliff Hicks CB; 38 Mark Kelso FS; 37 Nate Odomes CB; 43 Kim Phillips DB; 29 David Pool CB; 46 Leonard Smith SS; 31 James Williams CB; Special teams: 11 Scott Norwood K; 10 Rick Tuten P	Reserve lists: 82 Don Beebe WR/KR (IR); -- Kerry Brady K (IR); 61 Leonard Burton C (IR); 33 Eddie Fuller RB (IR); 81 Deval Glover WR (PUP); -- Brent Griffith G (IR); 26 Chris Hale CB/PR (IR); 47 Kirby Jackson CB (IR); -- Carl Mims CB (IR); 40 Robb Riddick RB (PUP); 25 Tim Smiley S (PUP); Practice squad: -- Clarkston Hines WR; -- Pat Marlatt DE; 93 Wes Pritchett LB; 79 Joe Staysniak G/T; 47 active, 11 inactive, 4 practice squad
*Note: rookies in italics

== Regular season ==
Bruce Smith set a club record with 19 sacks. Smith also had 101 tackles.

- September 24, 1990 – Thurman Thomas rushed for 214 yards versus the New York Jets. It was the second highest total in the history of Monday Night Football.
- Bruce Smith had 8 tackles, 2 sacks, and 4 hurries in the Bills 30–23 victory over Philadelphia.
- Bruce Smith had 9 tackles, 4 sacks, and 2 pressures in the Bills victory over Indianapolis.

=== Schedule ===
Week	Date	Opponent	Result	Record	Venue	Attendance
1	September 9	**Indianapolis Colts**	**W** 26–10	1–0	Rich Stadium	78,899
2	September 16	at **Miami Dolphins**	**L** 7–30	1–1	Joe Robbie Stadium	68,142
3	September 24	at **New York Jets**	**W** 30–7	2–1	Giants Stadium	69,927
4	September 30	Denver Broncos	**W** 29–28	3–1	Rich Stadium	74,393
5	October 7	Los Angeles Raiders	**W** 38–24	4–1	Rich Stadium	80,076
6	Bye					
7	October 21	**New York Jets**	**W** 30–27	5–1	Rich Stadium	79,002
8	October 28	at **New England Patriots**	**W** 27–10	6–1	Foxboro Stadium	51,959
9	November 4	at Cleveland Browns	**W** 42–0	7–1	Cleveland Municipal Stadium	78,331
10	November 11	Phoenix Cardinals	**W** 45–14	8–1	Rich Stadium	74,904
11	November 18	**New England Patriots**	**W** 14–0	9–1	Rich Stadium	74,729
12	November 26	at Houston Oilers	**L** 24–27	9–2	Houston Astrodome	60,130
13	December 2	Philadelphia Eagles	**W** 30–23	10–2	Rich Stadium	79,320
14	December 9	at **Indianapolis Colts**	**W** 31–7	11–2	Hoosier Dome	53,268
15	December 15	at New York Giants	**W** 17–13	12–2	Giants Stadium	66,893
16	December 23	**Miami Dolphins**	**W** 24–14	13–2	Rich Stadium	80,325
17	December 30	at Washington Redskins	**L** 14–29	13–3	RFK Stadium	52,397
Note: Intra-division opponents are in **bold** text.

=== Game summaries ===
==== Week 1 vs. Colts ====
Week One: Indianapolis Colts (0–0) at Buffalo Bills (0–0)

Quarter	1	2	3	4	Total
Colts	3	0	7	0	**10**
**Bills**	3	13	0	10	**26**

at Rich Stadium, Orchard Park, New York

- Date: September 9
- Game time: 4:00 p.m. EST
- Game weather: 59 °F (15 °C)
- Game attendance: 78,899
- Referee: Gerald Austin
- TV announcers (NBC): Jim Donovan and Cris Collinsworth
- Box Score, Box Score

Game information

**First quarter**

- BUF – Scott Norwood 24-yard field goal, 8:04. Bills 3–0.
- IND – Dean Biasucci 24-yard field goal, 0:12. Tie 3–3.

**Second quarter**

- BUF – Butch Rolle 3-yard pass from Jim Kelly (Scott Norwood kick), 5:14. Bills 10–3.
- BUF – Scott Norwood 31-yard field goal, 1:58. Bills 13–3.
- BUF – Scott Norwood 37-yard field goal, 0:08. Bills 16–3.

**Third quarter**

- IND – Stanley Morgan 25-yard pass from Jeff George (Dean Biasucci kick), 6:38. Bills 16–10.

**Fourth quarter**

- BUF – Scott Norwood 47-yard field goal, 6:08. Bills 19–10.
- BUF – Thurman Thomas 6-yard run (Scott Norwood kick), 1:37. Bills 26–10.

Top passers

- IND – Jeff George – 13/24, 160 yards, TD
- BUF – Jim Kelly – 28/37, 283 yards, TD

Top rushers

- IND – Albert Bentley – 15 rushes, 50 yards
- BUF – Thurman Thomas – 20 rushes, 84 yards, TD

Top receivers

- IND – Stanley Morgan – 2 receptions, 47 yards, TD
- BUF – Keith McKeller – 7 receptions, 78 yards

==== Week 2 ====
Team	1	2	3	4	Total
Bills	0	0	0	7	7
• Dolphins	0	16	7	7	30

- Date: September 16
- Location: Joe Robbie Stadium
- Referee: Dick Hantak
- TV announcers (NBC): Joel Myers and Ahmad Rashad

The Bills offense never got rolling and were soundly defeated on the road, 30–7, to their rival Miami Dolphins.

==== Week 3 ====
Team	1	2	3	4	Total
• **Bills**	7	13	3	7	30
Jets	7	0	0	0	7

- Date: September 24
- Location: Giants Stadium, East Rutherford, New Jersey
- Game start: 9:00 p.m. EST
- Game weather: 57 °F (14 °C), wind 17 mph (27 km/h)
- Referee: Tom Dooley
- TV announcers (ABC): Frank Gifford, Al Michaels, Dan Dierdorf
- Source: Pro-Football-Reference.com

Scoring summary
1	NYJ	Brad Baxter 1-yard run (Pat Leahy kick)	Jets 7–0
1	BUF	Kenneth Davis 1-yard run (Scott Norwood kick)	Tie 7–7
2	BUF	Butch Rolle 2-yard pass from Jim Kelly (Scott Norwood kick)	Bills 14–7
2	BUF	Scott Norwood 48-yard field goal	Bills 17–7
2	BUF	Scott Norwood 42-yard field goal	Bills 20–7
3	BUF	Scott Norwood 27-yard field goal	Bills 23–7
4	BUF	Keith McKeller 6-yard pass from Jim Kelly (Scott Norwood kick)	Bills 30–7

==== Week 4 ====
Team	1	2	3	4	Total
Broncos	7	7	7	7	28
• Bills	0	3	6	20	29

- Date: September 30
- Location: Rich Stadium, Orchard Park, New York
- Game weather: 58 °F (14 °C); wind 11 mph (18 km/h)
- Referee: Bob McElwee
- TV announcers (NBC): Don Criqui and Bob Trumpy

Scoring summary
Q1	DEN	Humphrey 1 yard run (Treadwell kick)	DEN 7–0
Q2	DEN	Sewell 3 yard run (Treadwell kick)	DEN 14–0
Q2	BUF	Norwood 37 yard field goal	DEN 14–3
Q3	BUF	Smith 12 yard run (kick failed)	DEN 14–9
Q3	DEN	Winder 3 yard run (Treadwell kick)	DEN 21–9
Q4	BUF	Bennett 80 yard blocked field goal return (Norwood kick)	DEN 21–16
Q4	BUF	Smith 39 yard interception return (kick failed)	BUF 22–21
Q4	BUF	Davis 2 yard run (Norwood kick)	BUF 29–21
Q4	DEN	Nattiel 7 yard pass from Elway (Treadwell kick)	BUF 29–28

The Bills avenged their 1989 Monday Night defeat against the defending AFC Champion Broncos. The Broncos rushed for 208 yards, led 21–9 after three quarters, and held Jim Kelly and the offense to just 197 yards of offense, but the pivotal play of the game erupted in the fourth on a touchdown return of a blocked Bronco field goal by linebacker Cornelius Bennett. That started a three-touchdown, 20-point outburst in all of 77 seconds, with Leonard Smith returning a John Elway interception for one score and recovering an Elway fumbled snap inside the 5 to set up yet another easy touchdown to win 29–28.

==== Week 5 ====
Team	1	2	3	4	Total
Raiders	7	3	7	7	24
• Bills	0	7	7	24	38

- Date: October 7
- Location: Rich Stadium
- Game start: 7:30 PM EST
- Game attendance: 80,076
- Game weather: 71 °F (22 °C); wind 16 mph (26 km/h)
- Referee: Red Cashion
- TV announcers (NFL on TNT): Skip Caray and Pat Haden

The Bills, on Sunday Night Football, trailed 24–14 in the fourth quarter before erupting to 24 points to defeat the then-unbeaten Los Angeles Raiders, 38–24. Among the fourth quarter scores were a blocked punt by Steve Tasker, returned by J.D. Williams, where Skip Caray burst into saying "They've done it again, they've done it again!" referencing the prior weeks block of a field goal for a TD return vs Denver....and a fumble return by Nate Odomes.

==== Week 7 ====
Team	1	2	3	4	Total
Jets	7	14	3	3	27
• Bills	0	17	7	6	30

- Date: October 21
- Location: Rich Stadium
- Game start: 1:00PM EST
- Game attendance: 79,002
- Game weather: 53 °F (12 °C); wind 12 mph (19 km/h)
- Referee: Tom White
- TV announcers (NBC): Don Criqui and Ahmad Rashad

For the third straight game the Bills erased a two-score gap for the win. The Jets led 21–7 in the second quarter and 24–17 in the third, but Kelly's 60-yard score to James Lofton tied the game entering the fourth quarter. Jamie Mueller's touchdown catch then won it, 30–27.

==== Week 8 ====
Team	1	2	3	4	Total
• Bills	7	7	13	0	27
Patriots	0	3	0	7	10

- Date: October 28
- Location: Sullivan Stadium
- Game attendance: 51,959
- Game weather: 45 °F (7 °C); wind 12 mph (19 km/h)
- Referee: Gene Barth
- TV announcers (NBC): Don Criqui and Bob Trumpy

The Bills beat the Patriots 27–10 at Foxboro Stadium, known as Sullivan Stadium at the time.

==== Week 9 ====
Team	1	2	3	4	Total
• Bills	7	7	7	21	42
Browns	0	0	0	0	0

- Date: November 4
- Location: Cleveland Municipal Stadium
- Game start: 4:00
- Game attendance: 78,331
- Referee: Jerry Seeman
- TV announcers (NBC): Don Criqui and Bob Trumpy

The Bills avenged last season's playoff loss by destroying the Cleveland Browns in their own stadium 42–0.

==== Week 10 ====
Team	1	2	3	4	Total
Cardinals	7	0	7	0	14
• Bills	0	21	0	24	45

- Date: November 11
- Location: Rich Stadium
- Game start: 1:00 PM EST
- Game attendance: 74,904
- Game weather: 37 °F (3 °C); wind 27 mph (43 km/h)
- Referee: Bob McElwee
- TV announcers (CBS): Dick Stockton and Merlin Olsen

The Bills welcomed the NFC East team Phoenix Cardinals to an extremely windy Rich Stadium, and defeated them 45–14.

==== Week 11 ====
Team	1	2	3	4	Total
Patriots	0	0	0	0	0
• Bills	7	0	0	7	14

- Date: November 18
- Location: Rich Stadium
- Referee: Johnny Grier
- Television network: NBC

The Bills, led by 209 yards on the ground (including an 80-yard Thurman Thomas TD run), shut out the Patriots 14–0 at Rich Stadium.

==== Week 12 ====
Team	1	2	3	4	Total
Bills	7	7	3	7	24
• Oilers	7	6	7	7	27

- Date: November 26
- Location: Astrodome
- Game weather: Indoors (dome)
- Referee: Jim Tunney
- TV announcers (ABC): Al Michaels, Frank Gifford, Dan Dierdorf

A year after Buffalo's epic 47–41 win at the Astrodome they returned there at 9–1 to face the 5–5 Oilers on Monday Night Football. This time the Oilers made sure there would be no comeback as Warren Moon and Lorenzo White authored 425 combined yards of offense and three touchdowns. Kelly managed two touchdowns and a pick as the Bills fell 27–24 to their former division foe.

==== Week 13 ====
Philadelphia Eagles (7-4) at Buffalo Bills (9-2)

Team	1	2	3	4	Total
Eagles	0	16	7	0	23
• Bills	24	0	3	3	30

- Date: December 2
- Location: Rich Stadium, Orchard Park, New York
- Game start: 1:00 p.m. EST
- Game weather: Sunny; 42 °F (6 °C); wind 16 mph (26 km/h)
- Referee: Tom Dooley
- TV announcers (NFL on CBS): Verne Lundquist and Dan Fouts

Scoring summary
Q1	BUF	James Lofton 63 yard pass from Jim Kelly (Scott Norwood kick)	BUF 7–0
Q1	BUF	Scott Norwood 43 yard field goal	BUF 10–0
Q1	BUF	Andre Reed 56 yard pass from Jim Kelly (Scott Norwood kick)	BUF 17–0
Q1	BUF	Thurman Thomas 4 yard pass from Jim Kelly (Scott Norwood kick)	BUF 24–0
Q2	PHI	Keith Jackson 18 yard pass from Randall Cunningham (kick failed)	BUF 24–6
Q2	PHI	Roger Ruzek 32 yard field goal	BUF 24–9
Q2	PHI	Fred Barnett 95 yard pass from Randall Cunningham (Roger Ruzek kick)	BUF 24–16
Q3	PHI	Keith Byars 1 yard pass from Randall Cunningham (Roger Ruzek kick)	BUF 24–23
Q3	BUF	Scott Norwood 21 yard field goal	BUF 27–23
Q4	BUF	Scott Norwood 45 yard field goal	BUF 30–23

The Bills opened the game in the no-huddle offense and used it the whole game. The Bills went up 24–0 in the 1st qtr and eventually won the game 30–23.

==== Week 14 ====
Team	1	2	3	4	Total
• Bills	14	7	3	7	31
Colts	0	0	7	0	7

- Date: December 9
- Location: Hoosier Dome Indianapolis
- Game start: 1:00 PM EST
- Game attendance: 53,268
- Game weather: Dome
- Referee: Gene Barth
- TV announcers (NBC): Marv Albert and Paul Maguire

==== Week 15 ====
Team	1	2	3	4	Total
• Bills	7	7	0	3	17
Giants	7	3	3	0	13

- Date: December 15
- Location: Giants Stadium East Rutherford, New Jersey
- Game start: 12:30 PM EST
- Game attendance: 66,893
- Game weather: 37 °F (3 °C) • 10 miles per hour (16 km/h; 8.7 kn)
- Referee: Pat Haggerty (American football official)
- TV announcers (NFL on NBC): Dick Enberg, Bill Walsh (American football coach), and O. J. Simpson

The Bills pulled out a close win this Saturday afternoon, in a game in which both starting quarterbacks went down with injuries. Jim Kelly, and New York QB Phil Simms, with the latter being out for the season.

==== Week 16 ====
Team	1	2	3	4	Total
Dolphins	0	0	7	7	14
• Bills	0	7	10	7	24

- Date: December 23
- Location: Rich Stadium
- Game attendance: 80,325
- Game weather: 35 °F (2 °C) • 5 miles per hour (8.0 km/h; 4.3 kn)
- Referee: Red Cashion
- TV announcers (NBC): Marv Albert and Paul Maguire

The Bills, under backup quarterback Frank Reich, defeated the Miami Dolphins and wrapped up the AFC East title. Reich connected with James Lofton and Andre Reed for touchdowns, ultimately winning 24–14 despite fourteen penalties to five for Miami.

==== Week 17 ====
Team	1	2	3	4	Total
Bills	0	0	7	7	14
• Redskins	3	6	3	17	29

- Date: December 30
- Location: RFK Stadium
- Referee: Dale Hamer
- TV announcers (NBC): Don Criqui and Bob Trumpy

Bills Head Coach Marv Levy decided to rest his starters for the playoffs, dropping the final game of the season in Washington, 29–14. The Bills finished with their best record in team history at 13 wins 3 losses.

=== Standings ===
AFC East
	W	L	T	PCT	DIV	CONF	PF	PA	STK
^{(1)} Buffalo Bills	13	3	0	.813	7–1	10–2	428	263	L1
^{(4)} Miami Dolphins	12	4	0	.750	7–1	10–2	336	242	W1
Indianapolis Colts	7	9	0	.438	3–5	5–7	281	353	L1
New York Jets	6	10	0	.375	2–6	4–10	295	345	W2
New England Patriots	1	15	0	.063	1–7	1–11	181	446	L14

== Playoffs ==
=== AFC Divisional Playoffs ===
Miami Dolphins (12–4) at Buffalo Bills (13–3)

Quarter	1	2	3	4	Total
Dolphins	3	14	3	14	34
Bills	13	14	3	14	44

at Rich Stadium, Orchard Park, New York

- Game time: Saturday, January 12, 1991. 12:30 pm EST
- Game weather: 31 °F (−1 °C), light snow
- Game attendance: 77,087
- Referee: Bob McElwee
- TV announcers (NBC): Marv Albert and Paul Maguire
- Box Score

Game information

First quarter

- BUF – Andre Reed 40-yard pass from Jim Kelly (Scott Norwood kick)
- MIA – Pete Stoyanovich 29-yard field goal
- BUF – Scott Norwood 24-yard field goal
- BUF – Scott Norwood 22-yard field goal

Second quarter

- BUF – Thurman Thomas 5-yard run (Scott Norwood kick)
- MIA – Mark Duper 64-yard pass from Dan Marino (Pete Stoyanovich kick)
- BUF – James Lofton 13-yard pass from Jim Kelly (Scott Norwood kick)
- MIA – Dan Marino 2-yard run (Pete Stoyanvich kick)

Third quarter

- MIA – Pete Stoyanovich 22-yard field goal
- BUF – Scott Norwood 28-yard field goal

Fourth quarter

- MIA – Roy Foster 2-yard pass from Dan Marino (Pete Stoyanovich kick)
- BUF – Thurman Thomas 5-yard run (Scott Norwood kick)
- BUF – Andre Reed 26-yard pass from Jim Kelly (Scott Norwood kick)
- MIA – Tony Martin 8-yard pass from Dan Marino (Pete Stoyanovich kick)

Passing

- MIA – Dan Marino 23/49, 323 yards, 3 TD, 2 INT
- BUF – Jim Kelly 19/29, 339 yards, 3 TD, INT

Rushing

- MIA – Sammie Smith 21 att, 99 yards
- BUF – Thurman Thomas 32 att, 117 yards, 2 TD

Receiving

- MIA – Mark Duper 3 rec, 113 yards, TD
- BUF – James Lofton 7 rec, 149 yards, TD

Despite being a close score, the Bills never trailed in this classic Jim Kelly versus Dan Marino shootout. The weather, steady light snow, had crews occasionally come out to shovel off the 10- and 5-yard lines. Despite the conditions, both team offenses were explosive. In the end, after winning the AFC East crown from the Dolphins a few weeks earlier, the Bills also ended the 'Fins season in a game which had 78 combined points.

=== AFC Championship Game ===
Los Angeles Raiders (12-4) at Buffalo Bills (13-3)

Quarter	1	2	3	4	Total
Raiders	3	0	0	0	3
Bills	21	20	0	10	51

at Rich Stadium, Orchard Park, New York

- Game time: Sunday, January 20, 1991. 12:30 pm EST
- Game weather: 35 °F (2 °C), rain/light snow
- Game attendance: 80,325
- Referee: Jim Tunney
- TV announcers (NBC): Dick Enberg and Bill Walsh
- Box Score

Game information

First quarter

- BUF – James Lofton 13-yard pass from Jim Kelly (Scott Norwood kick)
- LA – Jeff Jaeger 41-yard field goal
- BUF – Thurman Thomas 12-yard run (Scott Norwood kick)
- BUF – Darryl Talley 27-yard interception return (Scott Norwood kick)

Second quarter

- BUF – Kenneth Davis 1-yard run (kick failed)
- BUF – Kenneth Davis 3-yard run (Scott Norwood kick)
- BUF – James Lofton 8-yard pass from Jim Kelly (Scott Norwood kick)

Fourth quarter

- BUF – Kenneth Davis 1-yard run (Scott Norwood kick)
- BUF – Scott Norwood 39-yard field goal

Passing

- LA – Jay Schroeder 13/31, 150 yards, 5 INT
- BUF – Jim Kelly 17/23, 300 yards, 2 TD, INT

Rushing

- LA – Greg Bell 5 att, 36 yards
- BUF – Thurman Thomas 25 att, 138 yards, TD

Receiving

- LA – Mervyn Fernandez 4 rec, 57 yards
- BUF – James Lofton 5 rec, 113 yards, 2 TD

The Bills shredded the Raiders, limiting quarterback Jay Schroeder to 13 of 31 completions for 150 yards and intercepting him 5 times, while also holding running back Marcus Allen to just 26 yards on 10 carries. The Raiders offense clearly missed running back Bo Jackson, who suffered what would turn out to be a career-ending injury the week before in a win against the Cincinnati Bengals. On offense, the Bills amassed 502 total yards, including 202 yards on the ground. Running back Thurman Thomas rushed for 138 and a touchdown while also catching 5 passes for 61 yards, while running back Kenneth Davis tied an AFC playoff record with 3 rushing touchdowns. Buffalo also set an NFL playoff record by scoring 41 points in the first half. Bills quarterback Jim Kelly threw for 300 yards and two touchdown passes to wide receiver James Lofton, who finished the game with 5 receptions for 113 yards. Thomas recorded a 12-yard touchdown run, while Davis scored from 1 yard, 3 yards, and 1 yard out. Linebacker Darryl Talley returned one of his two interceptions 27 yards for a touchdown.

=== Super Bowl XXV ===
Quarter	1	2	3	4	Total
Bills	3	9	0	7	19
Giants	3	7	7	3	20

at Tampa Stadium, Tampa, Florida

- Date: January 27, 1991
- Game time: 5:30 p.m.
- Game weather: 62 °F (17 °C), wind 8 mph (13 km/h)
- Referee: Jerry Seeman
- Box Score

Game information

First quarter

- NYG – Matt Bahr 28-yard field goal
- BUF – Scott Norwood 23-yard field goal

Second quarter

- BUF – Don Smith 1-yard run (Scott Norwood kick)
- BUF – Safety, Bruce Smith tackled Jeff Hostetler in end zone
- NYG – Stephen Baker 14-yard pass from Jeff Hostetler (Matt Bahr kick)

Third quarter

- NYG – Ottis Anderson 1-yard run (Matt Bahr kick)

Fourth quarter

- BUF – Thurman Thomas 31-yard run (Scott Norwood kick)
- NYG – Matt Bahr 21-yard field goal

Passing

- BUF – Jim Kelly 18/30, 212 yards
- NYG – Jeff Hostetler 20/32, 222 yards, TD

Rushing

- BUF – Thurman Thomas 15 att, 135 yards, TD
- NYG – Ottis Anderson 21 att, 102 yards, TD

Receiving

- BUF – Andre Reed 8 rec, 62 yards
- NYG – Mark Ingram 5 rec, 74 yards

To counteract the Bills' no-huddle offense, the Giants' strategy was to use a power running game utilizing O.J. Anderson, aided by quarterback rollouts, bootlegs, and play-action fakes. As tight end Mark Bavaro later recalled, "[w]e came out with three tight ends, fat slobs picking you up and moving you and letting you tackle O.J., if you could." This enabled them to take time off the clock and limit Buffalo's possessions. The Giants set a Super Bowl record for time of possession with 40 minutes, 33 seconds, including 22 minutes in the second half. On defense, New York wanted to be physical with Buffalo's wideouts, and play with extra defensive backs to concentrate on stopping the Bills passing game, while conceding the running game.

The contrast in strategies was evident during the first period. After forcing the Bills to punt on the opening drive of the game, the Giants consumed 6:15 off the clock by marching 58 yards in 10 plays to score on a 28-yard field goal from Matt Bahr. In that drive, New York ran five rushing plays and five passing plays. But the Bills struck right back on their ensuing possession with a five-play, 66-yard drive that took 1:23 off the clock, including a tipped 61-yard completion from quarterback Jim Kelly to receiver James Lofton that set up Scott Norwood's 23-yard field goal to tie the game at 3–3.

After forcing the Giants to punt on their ensuing possession, the Bills' offensive strategy started to work to perfection. Kelly led the Bills on a 12-play, 80-yard scoring drive that consumed 4:27 and moved the ball so effectively that the team never faced a third down. Kelly completed six consecutive passes (four to Andre Reed) for 62 yards, and running back Don Smith capped it off with a one-yard touchdown run to give Buffalo a 10–3 lead. Smith's 1-yard touchdown run was his only carry of the game and the last carry of his career. Reed's 5 first quarter receptions were a Super Bowl record.

After trading punts, the Giants were pinned at their own 7-yard line. On second down, defensive lineman Bruce Smith sacked quarterback Jeff Hostetler in the end zone for a safety, increasing the Bills' lead 12–3. On the play, Smith had a chance to force a fumble since Hostetler was holding the football with only his throwing hand. But to his credit, Hostetler held the ball away from Smith, helping to ensure that only 2 points would be surrendered.

The Bills started out on their next drive with great field position following the free kick, but were forced to punt after 3 plays. Taking the ball at their own 13-yard line with 3:43 left in the second quarter, the Giants abandoned their long drive strategy and employed a quick strike attack of their own. Hostetler led the Giants 87 yards, scoring on a 14-yard touchdown pass to wide receiver Stephen Baker with just 25 seconds left in the half to cut New York's deficit to 12–10.

The Giants then opened the third quarter and resumed their original game strategy by driving 75 yards in 14 plays to score on Ottis Anderson's one-yard touchdown run, taking their first lead of the game since their opening possession at 17–12. The drive consumed a Super Bowl record nine minutes and 29 seconds, and included four successful third down conversions. The highlight was a 14-yard pass to wide receiver Mark Ingram on 3rd down and 13 yards to go. Ingram caught a short pass and broke five Buffalo tackles to get the first down and keep the drive alive.

After forcing Buffalo to punt on their ensuing possession, New York drove to the Bills' 35-yard line. But on fourth and two, Smith tackled Anderson for a 2-yard loss. Buffalo then took over and stormed down the field, advancing 63 yards in just four plays and scoring on a 31-yard burst from running back Thurman Thomas on the first play of the fourth quarter, regaining the lead at 19–17. Thomas' fourth-quarter touchdown run marked 1,000 points scored in Super Bowl history (1,001 with the extra point).

However, before the Bills' defenders had a chance to catch their breath, they found themselves back on the field trying to contain another long Giants drive. This one went for 14 plays and 74 yards, half of which came off passes from Hostetler to tight end Mark Bavaro, and took another 7:32 off the clock. The Bills managed to halt the drive at their own 3-yard line when linebacker Cornelius Bennett broke up Hostetler's third down pass, but Bahr kicked his second field goal to give New York a 20–19 lead.

On the Bills' ensuing possession, they could only advance to their own 41-yard line before having to punt, enabling the Giants to take more time off the clock. The Bills finally forced New York to punt and took the ball at their own 10-yard line with 2:16 remaining. Kelly then led them down the field with a mix of scrambles, short passes, and Thomas runs. Buffalo drove to the Giants' 29-yard line, setting up Norwood for a 47-yard field goal attempt with eight seconds left. However, his kick barely sailed wide right, sealing New York's victory with 4 seconds left.

== Player stats ==
=== Thurman Thomas ===
Thomas led the NFL in total yards from scrimmage for the second consecutive season. His 1,297 yards led the AFC and was second in the NFL to Barry Sanders. Thomas had at least 100 total yards in 10 of the Bills 16 games. After gaining 219 total yards versus the New York Jets, Thomas was named AFC offensive player of the week. Note: Rush = Rushing Yards; REC = Receiving Yards

Game	Rush	Rec	Total
Indianapolis	84	61	145
Miami	23	37	60
New York Jets	214	5	219
Denver	36	25	61
LA Raiders	67	47	114
New York Jets	5	0	5
New England	136	9	145
Cleveland	58	65	123
Phoenix	112	0	112
New England	165	5	170
Houston	54	32	86
Philadelphia	53	39	92
Indianapolis	76	91	167
New York Giants	60	65	125
Miami	154	29	183
Washington	0	22	22

Defense

FS
John Hagy
Mark Kelso

WLB	ILB	ILB	SLB
Darryl Talley	Ray Bentley	Shane Conlan	⋅
⋅	Carlton Bailey	⋅	⋅

SS
Leonard Smith
⋅

CB
Kirby Jackson
James Williams

DE	NT	DE
Bruce Smith	Jeff Wright	Leon Seals
⋅	⋅	⋅

CB
Nate Odomes
⋅

Offense

WR
James Lofton
⋅

LT	LG	C	RG	RT
Will Wolford	Jim Ritcher	Kent Hull	John Davis	Howard Ballard
⋅	⋅	⋅	⋅	⋅

TE
Keith McKeller
⋅

WR
Andre Reed
⋅

QB
Jim Kelly
⋅

RB
Thurman Thomas
⋅

FB
Jamie Mueller
⋅

Special teams
PK Scott Norwood
P Rick Tuten
KR Don Smith
PR Al Edwards

== Awards and records ==
- Led NFL in Points Scored, 428
- Jim Kelly, NFL Passing Leader, 101.2 Passer Rating
- Jim Kelly, Most Valuable Player, Pro Bowl
- Bruce Smith, NFL Defensive Player of the Year
- Bruce Smith, UPI AFL-AFC Player of the Year, Defense
- Bruce Smith, Newspaper Enterprise Association Defensive Player of the Year Award
- Bruce Smith, Team Record, Number of Sacks in a Single Season, (19)
- Bruce Smith, AFC Defensive Player of the Month, December
- Thurman Thomas, NFL Combined Yards from Scrimmage Leader
