= Wide Right (Buffalo Bills) =

Missed field goal at the conclusion of Super Bowl XXV

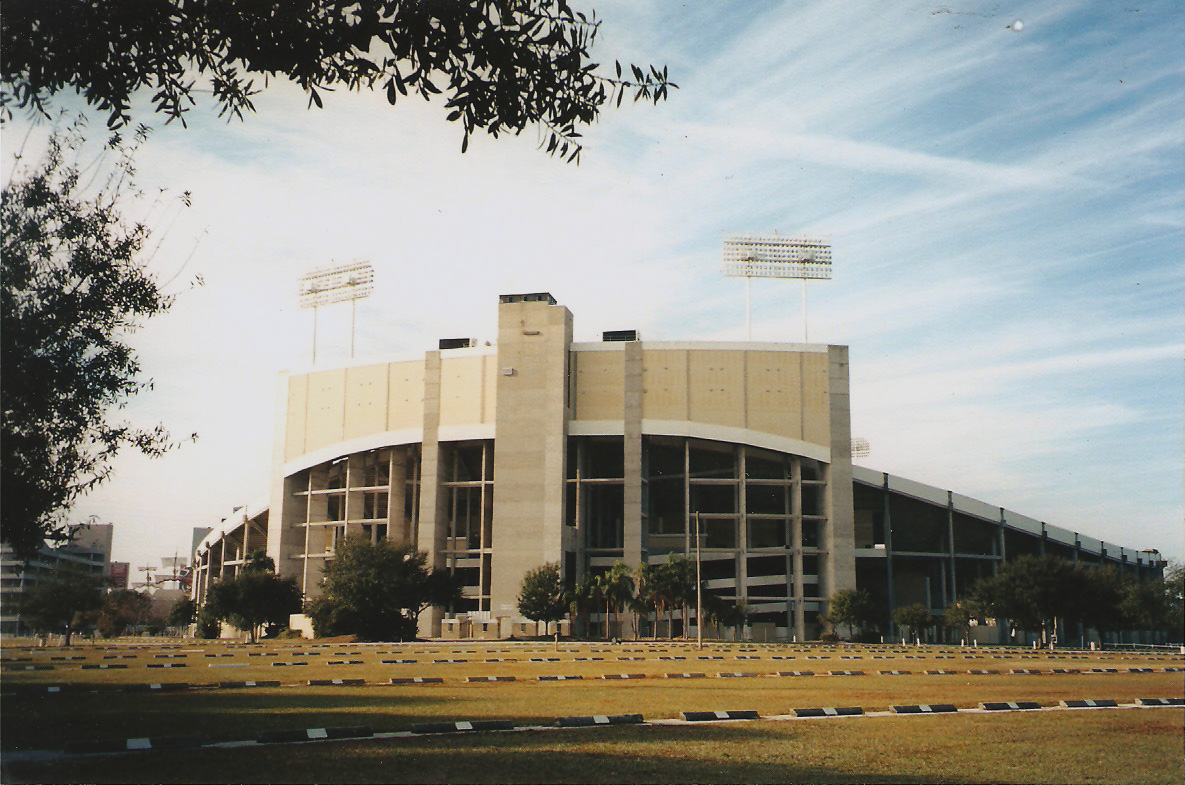
- Tampa Stadium, the site of Super Bowl XXV.
Buffalo Bills (1) (AFC) (13–3)	New York Giants (2) (NFC) (13–3)
19	20
Head coach: Marv Levy	Head coach: Bill Parcells
	1	2	3	4	Total
BUF	3	9	0	7	19
NYG	3	7	7	3	20
- Date: January 27, 1991
- Stadium: Tampa Stadium; Tampa, Florida
- Favorite: Bills by 7
- Referee: Jerry Seeman
- Attendance: 73,813

TV in the United States
- Network: ABC
- Announcers: Al Michaels, Frank Gifford, and Dan Dierdorf

Wide Right, a.k.a. 47 Wide Right, was Scott Norwood's missed 47-yard field goal attempt for the Buffalo Bills at the end of Super Bowl XXV on January 27, 1991, as described by sportscaster Al Michaels. The missed field goal resulted in the game being won by the New York Giants. The phrase "wide right" has since become synonymous with the game itself, and has since been used in other sports. This game is also called The Miss by some Bills fans.

== The field goal attempt ==
Following an 11-yard run for a first down by Thurman Thomas, Jim Kelly spiked the ball for an incompletion to stop the clock (since the Bills had already exhausted their timeouts). With eight seconds left in the game, Norwood's Bills trailed the Giants by a single point. They chose to try a 47-yard field goal, which would win the game and the championship for the Bills. However, 47 yards was considered near the limit of Norwood's kicking range, particularly on a grass field, according to comments during the original game broadcast. Bills head coach Marv Levy also noted that fewer than 50% of such attempts succeeded. In fact, during his career, Norwood was 1 of 5 for field goal attempts of more than 40 yards on grass, and with his longest field goal being 48 yards in that season.

Norwood lined up for the 47-yard game-winning field goal attempt from the right hash of the 37-yard line, with Frank Reich the holder and Adam Lingner the long snapper. The kick, although it had sufficient distance, passed about a foot to the right of the righthand goalpost and the field goal attempt failed. Television sportscaster Al Michaels, calling the game for ABC, announced the occurrence to a stunned television audience: "No good...wide right. Giants win Super Bowl XXV." Later video analysis revealed Frank Reich mistakenly aligned the laces to the right, thereby positioning the kicked ball to fade right once in the air.

The Giants took possession with four seconds left and ran out the clock for a 20–19 victory, making this Super Bowl the closest ever. Had Norwood successfully scored it would have likely given the Bills a 22–20 victory, their first Super Bowl win, and it would also have been the first Super Bowl to be decided by a game-ending field goal since Jim O'Brien's 32-yard kick which gave the Baltimore Colts a 16–13 victory against the Dallas Cowboys in Super Bowl V.

== Aftermath ==
In losing the game, the Bills lost their first of four consecutive Super Bowls. This loss was the closest the team got to victory, as the following three Super Bowls ended with the Bills losing by considerable margins (13 points to the Washington Redskins in Super Bowl XXVI, 35 points to the Dallas Cowboys in Super Bowl XXVII, and 17 points to the Cowboys in Super Bowl XXVIII, respectively). The city of Buffalo had not won a Big 4 sports championship since 1965 (which became the longest such streak of futility for any city that has at least two major sports franchises once San Diego, whose last title came in 1963, lost one of its two teams in 2017), so Norwood's unsuccessful attempt had an even greater significance. As of 2026, the winless streak remains intact.

The Bills immediately began searching for a replacement for Norwood after the missed kick. Former Giants kicker Björn Nittmo was brought into the 1991 training camp but failed to impress, which kept Norwood on the roster for the 1991 season. Finally, in 1992, the Bills signed the kicker who would become Norwood's replacement, Steve Christie, which ended Norwood's career.

A similar occurrence happened in the Divisional round of the 2023–24 NFL playoffs against the Kansas City Chiefs; Bills kicker Tyler Bass missed a game-tying 44-yard kick late in the 4th quarter to the right of the goalpost leading to the Bills' loss, which drew comparisons to Norwood's "Wide Right" kick, including by the game's commentator Jim Nantz, who said "Wide right. The two most dreaded words in Buffalo have surfaced again."

== See also ==
- Buffalo '66
- The Comeback
- Gary Anderson's missed field goal in the 1998 NFC Championship Game
- Mike Vanderjagt’s missed field goal in the 2005 AFC Divisional Round
- Double Doink
- River City Relay
- List of nicknamed NFL games and plays
