= Mike Lodish =

American football player (born 1967)

No. 73, 97
- Position: Defensive tackle

Personal information
- Born: August 11, 1967 (age 59); Detroit, Michigan, U.S.
- Listed height: 6 ft 3 in (1.91 m)
- Listed weight: 270 lb (122 kg)

Career information
- High school: Bloomfield Hills (MI) Brother Rice
- College: UCLA
- NFL draft: 1990: 10th round, 265th overall pick

Career history
- Buffalo Bills (1990–1994); Denver Broncos (1995–2000)

Awards and highlights
- 2× Super Bowl champion (XXXII, XXXIII); Second Team All-Pac 10 (1989)

Career NFL statistics
- Tackles: 150
- Sacks: 8.5
- Touchdowns: 2
- Stats at Pro Football Reference

Michael Timothy Lodish (born August 11, 1967) is an American former professional football player who was a defensive tackle in the National Football League (NFL). He was selected by the Buffalo Bills in the tenth round of the 1990 NFL draft with the 265th overall pick. A 6'3", 270-lb. defensive tackle and nose tackle from UCLA, Lodish played in 11 NFL seasons from 1990-2000 for the Bills and Denver Broncos.

== Six Super Bowls ==
Lodish is tied with Don Beebe and Stephen Gostkowski for second in all-time Super Bowl appearances with six. This is only behind Tom Brady, who played in his tenth Super Bowl on February 7, 2021, at Super Bowl LV in Tampa, Florida (Lodish and Gostkowski played in the Super Bowl six times, while Beebe only played in three of the six Super Bowls he was on the team for). Lodish made four consecutive appearances with the Buffalo Bills in Super Bowls XXV, XXVI, XXVII & XXVIII and two appearances with the Denver Broncos in Super Bowls XXXII & XXXIII. The Buffalo Bills would lose all four consecutive Super Bowls, while the Denver Broncos would win their back-to-back appearances.

== Personal ==
Lodish has worked as an NFL player agent at Ethos Sports Management from 2004 to 2009 and was a sales rep for a Michigan-based communications company, TVS Communication Solutions from 2009 to 2011.

He went to Brother Rice High School in Bloomfield Hills, MI.
