= Super Bowl XXV =

1991 edition of the Super Bowl

Buffalo Bills (1) (AFC) (13–3)	New York Giants (2) (NFC) (13–3)
19	20
Head coach: Marv Levy	Head coach: Bill Parcells
	1	2	3	4	Total
BUF	3	9	0	7	19
NYG	3	7	7	3	20
- Date: January 27, 1991
- Kickoff time: 6:20 p.m. EST (UTC-5)
- Stadium: Tampa Stadium; Tampa, Florida
- MVP: Ottis Anderson, running back
- Favorite: Bills by 7
- Referee: Jerry Seeman
- Attendance: 73,813

Ceremonies
- National anthem: Whitney Houston with the Florida Orchestra
- Coin toss: Pete Rozelle
- Halftime show: New Kids on the Block

TV in the United States
- Network: ABC
- Announcers: Al Michaels, Frank Gifford, Dan Dierdorf, Lynn Swann, and Jack Arute
- Nielsen ratings: 41.9 (est. 79.51 million viewers)
- Market share: 63
- Cost of 30-second commercial: $800,000

Radio in the United States
- Network: CBS Radio
- Announcers: Jack Buck and Hank Stram

Super Bowl XXV was an American football championship game to decide the National Football League (NFL) champion for the 1990 season between the American Football Conference (AFC) champion Buffalo Bills and the National Football Conference (NFC) champion New York Giants. The Giants defeated the Bills by the score of 20–19, winning their second Super Bowl. The game was held at Tampa Stadium in Tampa, Florida, and broadcast by ABC on January 27, 1991, and was the last time a Super Bowl would be held at Tampa Stadium (replaced by the Raymond James Stadium). Giants running back Ottis Anderson, who carried the ball 21 times for 102 yards and one touchdown, was named Super Bowl MVP. He was the first awardee to receive the newly named "Pete Rozelle Trophy" (named for the former commissioner, Pete Rozelle). Anderson also recorded one reception for seven yards.

The Bills and their explosive no-huddle offense were making their first Super Bowl appearance after finishing the regular season with a 13–3 record, and leading the league in total points scored with 428. In advancing to their second Super Bowl, the Giants also posted a 13–3 regular-season record, but with a ball-control offense and a defense that allowed a league-low 211 points. Super Bowl XXV became the first Super Bowl to feature two teams representing the same state, even though the Giants technically play in East Rutherford, New Jersey, a nearby suburb of New York City.

The game is best remembered for Bills placekicker Scott Norwood's last-second missed field goal attempt from 47-yards that went wide right of the uprights; the game is dubbed by the Bills fanbase as "The Miss" while the term "wide right" became coined afterwards as a phrase in professional sports. The game became the first (and so far only) Super Bowl decided by one point and the first Super Bowl in which neither team committed a turnover. The Giants set a Super Bowl record-holding possession of the ball for 40 minutes and 33 seconds. The Giants also overcame a 12–3 second-quarter deficit and made a 75-yard touchdown drive that consumed a Super Bowl-record 9:29 off the clock.

A memorable performance of "The Star-Spangled Banner" by Whitney Houston and the Florida Orchestra preceded the game. Jazz musician John Clayton arranged the piece. ABC, which broadcast the game in the United States, did not air the halftime show (which was headlined by the American boy band New Kids on the Block) live. Instead, the network televised a special ABC News report anchored by Peter Jennings on the progress of the ongoing Gulf War, then aired the halftime show on tape delay after the game.

Super Bowl XXV has been ranked by several outlets as one of the greatest Super Bowls of all time, with commentators highlighting the game as closely contested between both franchises in addition to its dramatic finale. The NFL in its 100 Greatest Games series ranked it at number 10. As with Super Bowl XXI, Phil Simms, who quarterbacked the victor Giants, would notably state "I'm going to Disney World!" immediately after the game on live television (Disney sponsored the pregame and halftime shows, and took ownership of ABC five years later). This phrase (sometimes with Disneyland substituted) became a tradition for players on winning teams after the game.

The Giants would not appear in another Super Bowl until 2001's Super Bowl XXXV (2001), suffering a blowout loss to the Ravens 34-7. The Giants would not win again until 2008's Super Bowl XLII where they upset the undefeated Patriots 17-14. This game was infamously the first of four consecutive Super Bowl losses for the Bills which continued with Super Bowl XXVI the following year.

== Background ==
=== Host selection process ===
NFL owners voted to award Super Bowl XXV to Tampa during a May 20, 1987 owners meeting held at Coronado, California. It was the second time that Tampa hosted the game; the city previously hosted XVIII on January 22, 1984. Voting for the "silver anniversary" Super Bowl drew bids from Tampa (Tampa Stadium), San Diego (Jack Murphy Stadium), Anaheim (Anaheim Stadium), Los Angeles (Coliseum), and Miami (Joe Robbie Stadium). The voting process took six ballots, and eventually narrowed down to two finalists: Tampa and San Diego. Anaheim and Los Angeles were eliminated on the first ballot, then Miami (already scheduled to host XXIII), was eliminated on the second.

After three additional rounds, neither Tampa nor San Diego could garner the desired 3/4 vote (21 of 28 owners). To break the stalemate, the vote switched to a simple majority. Though the final tally was kept secret, Tampa was said to have won by a close margin of only 2–3 votes. The Tampa Bay area won by virtue of proven success hosting XVIII, and the plans to move the Gasparilla Pirate Festival to Super Bowl week. San Diego was slated to host XXII, but since that day had not yet come, some owners were reluctant to award the city a second Super Bowl before they completed their first.

=== New York Giants ===
The 1990 New York Giants were built to head coach Bill Parcells's specifications of "power football": a strong defense and an offense meant to sustain extremely long drives. The Giants' defense ranked second in the league in fewest total yards allowed (4,392) and first in fewest points allowed, and boasted three Pro Bowl selections: defensive tackle Erik Howard, and linebackers Pepper Johnson and Lawrence Taylor (10.5 sacks and 1 interception). Linebacker Gary Reasons was also a strong force with 3 interceptions and 3 fumble recoveries. The secondary was led by defensive back Everson Walls, an offseason acquisition from the Dallas Cowboys, who recorded six interceptions, and safety Greg Jackson, who recorded five interceptions and four sacks. The Giants' offense was unspectacular, ranking just 17th in the league in yards gained and 13th in points scored. Despite that, they wore down opposing teams' defenses with extremely long drives, thus keeping their opponents' offense on the sidelines and preventing them from scoring. More importantly, the Giants set an NFL record by losing only 14 turnovers in a 16-game regular season. A big reason for the team's offensive success was the blocking of linemen Bart Oates and William Roberts, the only Pro Bowlers on the offense. Ottis Anderson was the team's leading rusher with 784 yards and 11 touchdowns, while also catching 18 passes for 139 yards. Kick returner Dave Meggett led the NFL in punt return yards (467), while also gaining 492 yards on kickoff returns, rushing for 164 yards, and catching 39 passes for 410 yards.

New York began the regular season by winning their first ten games, and then went into a tailspin and lost three of their next four. One week after losing to division rival Philadelphia Eagles, 31–13, the 10–1 Giants met defeat on Monday Night Football in a 7–3 defensive battle with the 10–1 San Francisco 49ers, who had won the previous two Super Bowls and ultimately finished the regular season with an NFL best 14–2 record. Then, in their 17–13 loss to the Bills, New York suffered a setback when starting quarterback Phil Simms, who had thrown for 2,284 yards and 15 touchdowns with only four interceptions during the year, went down for the season with a broken bone in his foot.

Simms's replacement, Jeff Hostetler, had started only two games in his seven years as a backup with the Giants. However, Hostetler displayed polished passing and scrambling ability in his limited playing time during the season, and threw only one interception and committed no fumbles. With Hostetler at the helm, the Giants responded by winning their final two games to finish the regular season 13–3, good enough to win the NFC East and earn the second seed in the NFC playoffs.

=== Buffalo Bills ===
The Bills defense was led by defensive end Bruce Smith, who recorded 19 sacks, forced four fumbles, and won the NFL Defensive Player of the Year Award. Behind him, three of the Bills' starting linebackers, Darryl Talley, Shane Conlan, and Cornelius Bennett, were selected to the Pro Bowl. Defensive back Kirby Jackson led the team in interceptions with 3. Pro Bowler Steve Tasker was part of special teams.

Despite their good defense, it was the Bills' flashy, high-powered offense that gained the most attention. Unlike the Giants, the Bills routinely used the no-huddle tactic to storm down the field and score points very quickly. Instead of going into a huddle after each play, quarterback Jim Kelly would immediately send his offense back to the line of scrimmage and make the call there after reading the defense. This strategy prevented opposing defenses from reading the Bills' formation correctly, making substitutions, or even catching their breath.

The Bills' no-huddle K-Gun offense worked well enough for Kelly to finish the regular season as the top-rated quarterback in the NFL (101.2), throwing for 2,829 yards, 24 touchdowns, and only nine interceptions. One reason for his success was that he had two outstanding wide receivers: future Hall of Famer Andre Reed, who made his specialty going across the middle on slants and crossing routes, recorded 71 receptions, 945 yards, and 8 touchdowns, and future Hall of Famer James Lofton, who was the big threat with 35 receptions for 712 yards (a 20.3 yards per catch average). Tight end Keith McKeller contributed 34 receptions for 464 yards and five touchdowns. Pro Bowl running back Thurman Thomas had an AFC-best 1,297 rushing yards, caught 49 passes for 532 yards, and scored 13 touchdowns. Thomas also led the NFL in yards from scrimmage for the second consecutive season. A key to the Bills' prolific offense was the blocking of its superb offensive line, led by All-Pro center Kent Hull and Pro Bowl left tackle Will Wolford.

Even though Kelly missed the last two games of the season with a knee injury, suffered in the same game in which the Giants lost Simms, the Bills finished with a 13–3 regular season record.

=== Playoffs ===
The Giants began their championship postseason run by a trivial elimination of the Chicago Bears, 31–3. In leading the Giants' "power football" offense, Hostetler threw only 17 passes, but two went for touchdowns and he threw no interceptions. He also directed a rushing attack that gained 194 yards, including 43 (and a touchdown) from Hostetler himself. This game offered a preview of what lay in store for Super Bowl XXV, as the Giants scored on drives of 75, 80, 49, and 51 yards, which lasted nine, 11, 11, and 16 plays, respectively. Overall, New York held the ball for 38:22, compared to Chicago's 21:38. However, New York lost another key player for the season when rookie running back Rodney Hampton, the team's second-leading rusher during the regular season with 455 yards, suffered a broken leg.

The following Sunday, the Giants upset the San Francisco 49ers 15–13 in the NFC Championship Game. The 49ers, an NFL-best 14–2 in the regular season and winners of the last two Super Bowls, were 8-point favorites at kickoff. Their outstanding defense was led by future Hall of Fame defensive back Ronnie Lott and linebacker Charles Haley, who led the NFC in sacks. San Francisco's offense was considered the best in the NFC, led by future Hall of Fame quarterback Joe Montana and wide receiver Jerry Rice. However, except for a 61-yard touchdown pass from Montana to wide receiver John Taylor, the Giants contained the 49ers' offense very well. A sack by Giants defensive end Leonard Marshall early in the fourth quarter knocked Montana out of the game. Despite their super defensive effort, the Giants still trailed 13–9 midway through the fourth quarter, but a 30-yard run from linebacker Gary Reasons on a fake punt set up kicker Matt Bahr's fourth field goal, cutting their deficit to 13–12. The 49ers (now led by Steve Young) tried to run out the clock on their ensuing possession, but running back Roger Craig had the ball dislodged by nose tackle Erik Howard, and Lawrence Taylor recovered the fumble in mid-air with 2:36 remaining. Five plays later, Bahr kicked his fifth field goal, a 41-yarder, as time expired to give New York the win.

As for the Bills, Jim Kelly returned from his injury to lead Buffalo to a 44–34 playoff victory over the Miami Dolphins. The Bills jumped to an early 20–3 lead, but Miami quarterback Dan Marino rallied his team back and cut Buffalo's lead to 30–27 going into the fourth quarter. However, Buffalo scored a touchdown on their first drive of the period with a 5-yard run by Thurman Thomas. Kicker Scott Norwood then recovered a fumble from Miami on the ensuing kickoff, allowing the Bills to put the game away with Kelly's 26-yard touchdown pass to Andre Reed. Kelly finished the game with 336 passing yards, three touchdowns, and 37 rushing yards. Reed was also a major factor, recording 123 receiving yards and a pair of touchdown catches. James Lofton caught seven passes for 149 yards and a touchdown. Thomas led the Bills' ground attack with 32 carries for 117 rushing yards and two touchdowns, while also catching three passes for 38 yards.

Buffalo then crushed the Los Angeles Raiders 51–3 in the AFC Championship Game, the most lopsided score in AFC Championship Game history. The Bills' defense dominated the Raiders' offense, which was without running back Bo Jackson, who suffered a career-ending injury against the Cincinnati Bengals the week before, limiting them to an early field goal and intercepting five passes from quarterback Jay Schroeder. Meanwhile, the Bills' offense racked up 502 yards, piling up yards and points so fast the game was out of reach by the end of the first half. Kelly was 17 of 23 for 300 yards passing, and two touchdowns to Lofton. Thomas had 138 yards rushing, 61 yards receiving, and his backup, Kenneth Davis, tied a playoff record with three touchdowns.

=== Super Bowl pregame news ===
The Bills and the Giants entered the game using contrasting styles. While the Bills led the league in total points scored (428), the Giants led the league in fewest points allowed (211). The teams had also met earlier in the season on December 15: the Bills defeated the Giants at Giants Stadium, 17–13, in a game which was close, but would prove to be not as close as Super Bowl XXV.

The Bills were thus heavily favored to win Super Bowl XXV. Most experts expected that the Giants' defense would not be able to contain the Bills' turbo-charged no-huddle offense, which had scored 95 points in 2 playoff games. Many also questioned how effective the Giants' offense would be after failing to score a single touchdown in the NFC Championship Game.

As the designated home team in the annual rotation between AFC and NFC teams, the Giants wore their home blue uniforms and white pants. The Bills donned their road all-white uniforms, which marked the only time they wore white in their four consecutive Super Bowl appearances. Both teams wore a patch with the game logo on the left shoulder of their jersey to commemorate the silver anniversary of the Super Bowl. This would not become a Super Bowl standard until Super Bowl XXXII.

With the Gulf War having begun 10 days prior to this Super Bowl's scheduled date of January 27; rumors had begun circulating of a possible delay or cancellation of the conference championship games and the Super Bowl. However, the NFL quickly denied those rumors by stating the games would go on as scheduled.

== Broadcasting ==
The game was broadcast in the United States by ABC. An estimated 750 million viewers worldwide have watched the Super Bowl. The broadcast featured the Monday Night Football team of play-by-play announcer Al Michaels and color commentators Frank Gifford and Dan Dierdorf. Brent Musburger hosted all the events with the help of then-ABC Sports analysts Bob Griese and Dick Vermeil, Musburger's regular color commentator on ABC's college football telecasts; with other contributors including Jack Arute, Bob Griese, Beth Ruyak, Jack Whitaker and ABC News correspondent Judd Rose (reporting from Saudi Arabia) as well as an interview with NFL Commissioner Paul Tagliabue.

Sponsors Coca-Cola and Diet Pepsi had to withdraw planned contest promotions or advertisements, due to the Gulf War situation. PepsiCo's contest, a heavily promoted $3 million giveaway in which viewers would be invited to call a toll-free number during the first three quarters; with the caller receiving a Diet Pepsi coupon and an opportunity to win one of 3 prizes totaling $1 million each, was also withdrawn under pressure from the telephone communications industry, the FCC, and Congress due to fears that the contest would cripple the telephone system. Specifically, subscribers in much of the country could have been prevented from receiving a dial tone for as long as a minute due to the expected torrent of calls.

CBS aired the game nationally on radio. Jack Buck served as play-by-play with Hank Stram as color commentator. In the teams' local markets, the game was carried on WNEW-AM in New York City with Jim Gordon, Dick Lynch, and Karl Nelson and WGR in Buffalo, New York with Van Miller, Ed Rutkowski, and Pete Weber.

The game was broadcast in the United Kingdom on Channel 4, in Mexico on the Canal de las Estrellas, in Canada on Global Television Network and in Venezuela on Venevisión. Because of the Gulf War situation, this marked the first time the Super Bowl aired in most countries around the world. Outside of North America and England, this Super Bowl aired for the first time in countries such as Australia and Russia.

== Entertainment ==
=== Pregame ceremonies ===
Whitney Houston performed "The Star-Spangled Banner" for Super Bowl XXV, backed by the Florida Orchestra under the direction of Maestro Jahja Ling. With America involved in the Gulf War, the positive response to the rousing performance was overwhelming; it would later see a release as a single and a video. It reached number 20 on the Billboard Hot 100 – making her the only act to turn the national anthem into a pop hit of that magnitude. At the conclusion of the anthem, four U.S. Air Force F-16 Fighting Falcons from MacDill Air Force Base overflew the stadium.

Houston's rendition was critically acclaimed and is considered among the best performances of the U.S. national anthem in history. The Whitney: The Greatest Hits album includes this music track. Following 9/11, the single was re-released by Arista Records, peaking at number 6 on the Hot 100 and was certified platinum by the RIAA.

Former NFL commissioner Pete Rozelle joined the coin toss ceremony.

=== Halftime show ===
The halftime show was titled "A Small World Salute to 25 Years of the Super Bowl". Produced by Disney, it featured over 3,500 local children from different ethnic backgrounds and a performance by boy band New Kids on the Block, with special guest Warren Moon.

ABC did not broadcast the halftime show live. Instead, they televised a special ABC News report anchored by Peter Jennings on the progress of the Gulf War. The halftime show was later shown on tape delay after the game at around 10:40 EST, although most ABC affiliates ran the first episode of Davis Rules following the Super Bowl, and may have televised the remaining parts of the halftime show later.

== Game summary ==
To counteract the Bills' no-huddle offense, the Giants' used a tough-nosed, conservative plan on both sides of the ball. On offense, the plan was to use a power running game utilizing Ottis Anderson, aided by quarterback rollouts, bootlegs, and play-action fakes. As tight end Mark Bavaro later recalled, "We came out with three tight ends, fat slobs picking you up and moving you and letting you tackle O.J. [Anderson], if you could." This enabled them to take time off the clock and limit Buffalo's possessions. The Giants set a Super Bowl record for time of possession with 40 minutes and 33 seconds, including 22 minutes in the second half.

On defense, New York wanted to be physical with Buffalo's wideouts, and play with extra defensive backs to concentrate on stopping the Bills' passing game, while shifting focus away from trying to stop Buffalo's running game. In his book The Education of a Coach, David Halberstam wrote that one of defensive coordinator Bill Belichick's specific plans to combat the Bills involved convincing his defense (who had been the best unit against the run in the NFL that season) that they would win the game if Thurman Thomas ran for more than 100 yards. Belichick also felt that Jim Kelly was not as good at reading defenses as some other elite quarterbacks were (for example, Joe Montana), and that Kelly tended to "freeze" what he was seeing from a series and then use that information on the next one, which meant the Giants could be a step ahead of him all game if they alternated their cover plans from drive to drive.

=== First quarter ===
The contrast in strategies was evident during the first quarter. After forcing the Bills to punt on their opening drive of the game, the Giants consumed 6:15 off the clock by marching 58 yards in 11 plays to score on a 28-yard field goal from kicker Matt Bahr. In that drive, New York ran six rushing plays, which included a 10-yard run by running back Dave Meggett, and five passing plays, which included quarterback Jeff Hostetler's passes for 13 and 16 yards to tight end Howard Cross and wide receiver Mark Ingram, respectively. However, Buffalo struck right back on their ensuing possession with a 6-play, 66-yard drive that took 1:23 off the clock, which included a 61-yard pass from quarterback Jim Kelly that was tipped by Giants cornerback Perry Williams, but caught by Bills wide receiver James Lofton to set up 1st-and-goal for Buffalo at the New York 8-yard line. However, the Giants' defense kept the Bills out of the end zone, forcing them to settle for kicker Scott Norwood's 23-yard field goal to tie the game, 3–3.

After forcing New York to punt on their ensuing possession, Buffalo's offensive strategy started to work to perfection. Kelly led the Bills on a 12-play, 80-yard scoring drive that consumed 4:27 and moved the ball so effectively that the team never faced a third down. Kelly completed six consecutive passes (four to wide receiver Andre Reed) for 62 yards, and running back Don Smith capped off the drive with a 1-yard touchdown run to give Buffalo their first lead of the game, 10–3, early in the second quarter. Smith's touchdown was his only carry of the game and the last carry of his career. Reed's five receptions in the first quarter were a Super Bowl record.

=== Second quarter ===
After the teams traded punts, Bills punter Rick Tuten's 43-yard kick pinned the Giants at their own 7-yard line. On second down, after New York center Bart Oates was flagged for holding, Buffalo defensive end Bruce Smith sacked Hostetler in the end zone for a safety, increasing the Bills' lead to 12–3. On the play, Smith had a chance to force a fumble, since Hostetler was holding the football with only his throwing hand, but Hostetler held the ball away from Smith, ensuring that only two points would be surrendered.

After the next three possessions ended in punts, the Giants got the ball at their own 13-yard line with 3:43 left in the second quarter. They abandoned their long-drive strategy and employed a quick-strike attack of their own. It worked, as Hostetler led the Giants on a 10-play, 87-yard drive, which featured an 18-yard run by running back Ottis Anderson, a 22-yard reception by Ingram, and a 16-yard run by Meggett. The drive ended with Hostetler's 14-yard touchdown pass to wide receiver Stephen Baker with just 25 seconds left in the half, cutting New York's deficit to 12–10.

=== Third quarter ===
The Giants opened the third quarter and resumed their original game strategy by driving 75 yards in 14 plays to score on Anderson's 1-yard touchdown run, giving the Giants a 17–12 lead. The drive consumed a then-Super Bowl record of 9:29 (since surpassed by the Giants themselves in Super Bowl XLII) and included four successful third down conversions. The highlight of the drive was a 14-yard reception by Ingram on 3rd-and-13, in which he caught a short pass from Hostetler and broke five tackles by the Buffalo defense to get the first down and keep the drive alive. With his touchdown included, Anderson recorded five runs for a total of 37 yards during the drive. By this point, the Bills' offense had gone nearly two hours of real-time (counting the halftime show) since they last possessed the ball.

After forcing the Bills to punt on their ensuing possession, a bad punt by Tuten set the Giants up with good field position at their own 42. They drove to the Buffalo 35-yard line, aided by a 10-yard reception by Cross, a defensive holding penalty on Bills cornerback Nate Odomes, and a 9-yard reception by Ingram. But when New York elected to convert 4th-and-2, Bruce Smith tackled Anderson for a 2-yard loss, giving the ball back to Buffalo on their own 37.

=== Fourth quarter ===
Immediately after the turnover on downs, the Bills advanced 63 yards in just four plays. Kelly completed a 9-yard pass to running back Thurman Thomas, followed by a pair of passes to running back Kenneth Davis for a gain of 23 yards. On the first play of the fourth quarter, Thomas broke three tackles by the Giants' defense and went the distance for a 31-yard touchdown run, putting the Bills back in front with a 19–17 lead. Thomas' touchdown marked 1,000 points scored in Super Bowl history (1,001 with the extra point). However, before the Buffalo defense had a chance to catch their breath, they found themselves back on the field trying to contain another long New York drive. This one went for 14 plays and 74 yards, half of which came off three passes from Hostetler to tight end Mark Bavaro and took 7:32 off the clock. The Bills managed to halt the drive at their own 3-yard line when linebacker Cornelius Bennett broke up Hostetler's third down pass, but Bahr kicked a 21-yard field goal to give the Giants the lead again, 20–19. On the Bills' ensuing possession, they could only advance to their own 41-yard line before having to punt, enabling the Giants to take more time off the clock. Buffalo finally forced New York to punt and took the ball at their own 10-yard line after a 38-yard punt by Sean Landeta, getting one more chance for a game-winning drive with 2:16 remaining.

On the Bills' final possession, Kelly led the team down the field with a mix of scrambles, short passes, and a pair of runs by Thomas, of which the last was for a critical 11 yards, managing to get the Bills to the Giants 29-yard line, just within field goal range with eight seconds to play. Norwood attempted a 47-yard game-winning field goal from the right hash of the 37-yard line, with backup quarterback Frank Reich the holder and center Adam Lingner the long snapper. (At the two-minute warning, ABC put up a graphic that showed Norwood's career history of field goal attempts of 40+ yards on grass fields; he was 1 for 5.) Norwood's kick sailed wide right, less than a yard outside of the goalpost upright. After Norwood's miss, the Giants ran out the clock to win their second Super Bowl title.

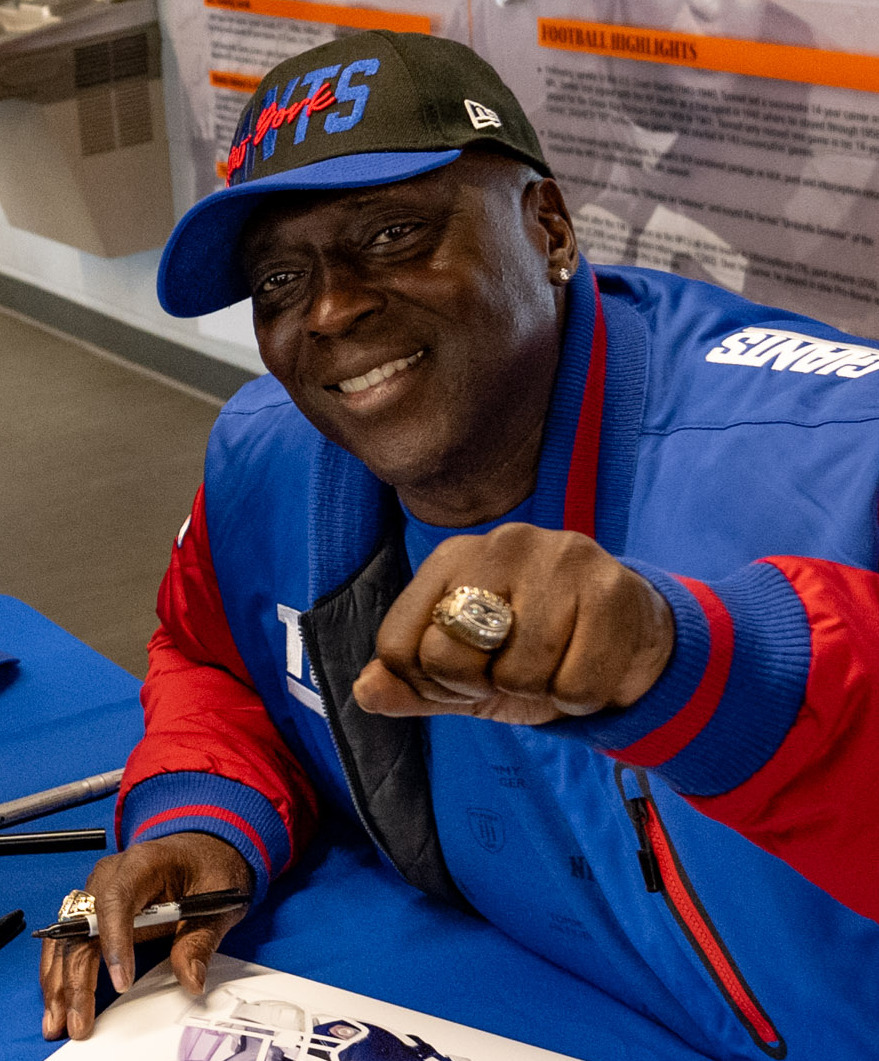
Super Bowl MVP O.J. Anderson in 2023

There were many impressive performances in the game by players from both teams. Jim Kelly completed 18 of 30 passes for 212 yards with no interceptions, while adding another 23 yards on six rushing attempts. Jeff Hostetler completed 20 of 32 passes for 222 yards and a touchdown, and rushed for 10 yards. Dave Meggett recorded 129 combined net yards (48 rushing, 18 receiving, 37 on punt returns, 26 on kickoff returns). But the best performances came from both teams' starting running backs. Ottis Anderson rushed for 102 yards, caught a pass for seven yards, and scored a touchdown. Thurman Thomas scored a touchdown, rushed for 135 yards, and caught five passes for 55 yards, giving him 190 total yards from scrimmage. Thomas' 135 yards are the most yards rushing for a member of a losing team. This was also only the second Super Bowl to have two 100-yard rushers. In Super Bowl III, New York Jets fullback Matt Snell recorded 121 rushing yards while Baltimore Colts halfback Tom Matte ran for 116. In lieu of saying the traditional "I'm going to Disney World", MVP O.J. Anderson said "I'm dedicating this win for our troops", although he was given the option of saying the former.

=== Aftermath ===
The defensive game plan for the Giants, written by then-defensive coordinator Bill Belichick, has been included in the Pro Football Hall of Fame. The Giants' triumph helped Belichick and wide receivers coach Tom Coughlin make their names and eventually land head-coaching jobs with the Cleveland Browns and Boston College, respectively. Belichick was head coach of the New England Patriots, while Coughlin went from Boston College to be the first head coach for the Jacksonville Jaguars, and spent 12 seasons as the head coach of the New York Giants before resigning in 2016. Giants head coach Bill Parcells retired shortly after winning his second Super Bowl with the Giants. However, he went on to coach three other teams since then: the New England Patriots (whom he helped bring to Super Bowl XXXI) from 1993–1996, the New York Jets from 1997–1999, and the Dallas Cowboys from 2003–2006. Both Coughlin and Belichick have gone on to win Super Bowls as head coaches: Belichick with the Patriots in Super Bowls XXXVI, XXXVIII, XXXIX, XLIX, LI, and LIII; Coughlin with the Giants in Super Bowls XLII and XLVI, coincidentally both against Belichick's Patriots.

It was the first Super Bowl (and NFL Playoff game) in which neither team committed a turnover. The only other Super Bowl to date without a turnover is Super Bowl XXXIV, in which the St. Louis Rams defeated the Tennessee Titans 23–16. Because of Thomas's high production, some sports writers, such as Sports Illustrated's Paul Zimmerman, felt that he should have won the game MVP even though his team lost, just as Chuck Howley had done in Super Bowl V.

Jim Kelly was the fourth starting quarterback to lose their Super Bowl debut and eventually make it back, after Craig Morton, whose Cowboys lost Super Bowl V to the Baltimore Colts but then got their redemption the next year in Super Bowl VI against the Dolphins, Bob Griese, who was the starting QB for the Dolphins in said loss but went on to get their redemption in Super Bowl VII the next year and then defend their title a year later, and John Elway, whose Broncos lost Super Bowl XXI but reached Super Bowl XXII the next year only to lose again. They eventually triumphed by winning back to back Super Bowls in XXXII and XXXIII. Kelly was the final starting quarterback to lose his Super Bowl debut and return until Jalen Hurts, whose Eagles reached Super Bowl LVII in 2023 but fell short against the Kansas City Chiefs, and then in 2025 reached Super Bowl LIX two years later with the two teams meeting again and the Eagles coming out on top.

=== Box score ===
Super Bowl XXV: New York Giants 20, Buffalo Bills 19

Quarter	1	2	3	4	Total
Bills (AFC)	3	9	0	7	19
Giants (NFC)	3	7	7	3	20

at Tampa Stadium, Tampa, Florida

- Date: January 27, 1991
- Game time: 6:19 p.m. EST
- Game weather: 71 °F (22 °C), clear

Scoring summary

Quarter	Time	Drive			Team	Scoring information	Score	
Quarter	Time	Plays	Yards	TOP	Team	Scoring information	BUF	NYG
1	7:14	11	58	6:15	NYG	28-yard field goal by Matt Bahr	0	3
1	5:51	6	66	1:23	BUF	23-yard field goal by Scott Norwood	3	3
2	12:30	12	80	4:27	BUF	Don Smith 1-yard touchdown run, Norwood kick good	10	3
2	8:27	3	–7	1:11	BUF	Jeff Hostetler tackled in end zone for a safety by Bruce Smith	12	3
2	0:25	10	87	3:24	NYG	Stephen Baker 14-yard touchdown reception from Hostetler, Bahr kick good	12	10
3	5:31	14	75	9:29	NYG	Ottis Anderson 1-yard touchdown run, Bahr kick good	12	17
4	14:52	4	63	1:27	BUF	Thurman Thomas 31-yard touchdown run, Norwood kick good	19	17
4	7:20	14	74	7:32	NYG	21-yard field goal by Bahr	19	20
"TOP" = time of possession. For other American football terms, see Glossary of American football.							19	20

== Final statistics ==
Sources: NFL.com Super Bowl XXV, Super Bowl XXV Play Finder NYG, Super Bowl XXV Play Finder Buf

=== Statistical comparison ===
	Buffalo Bills	New York Giants
First downs	18	24
First downs rushing	8	10
First downs passing	9	13
First downs penalty	1	1
Third down efficiency	1/8	9/16
Fourth down efficiency	0/0	0/1
Net yards rushing	166	172
Rushing attempts	25	39
Yards per rush	6.6	4.4
Passing – Completions/attempts	18/30	20/32
Times sacked-total yards	1–7	2–8
Interceptions thrown	0	0
Net yards passing	205	214
Total net yards	371	386
Punt returns-total yards	0–0	2–37
Kickoff returns-total yards	6–114	3–48
Interceptions-total return yards	0–0	0–0
Punts-average yardage	6–38.8	4–43.8
Fumbles-lost	1–0	0–0
Penalties-total yards	6–35	5–31
Time of possession	19:27	40:33
Turnovers	0	0

=== Individual statistics ===
Bills passing
	C/ATT^{1}	Yds	TD	INT	Rating
Jim Kelly	18/30	212	0	0	81.5
Bills rushing
	Car^{2}	Yds	TD	LG^{3}	Yds/Car
Thurman Thomas	15	135	1	31	9.00
Jim Kelly	6	23	0	9	3.83
Kenneth Davis	2	4	0	3	2.00
Jamie Mueller	1	3	0	3	3.00
Don Smith	1	1	1	1	1.00
Bills receiving
	Rec^{4}	Yds	TD	LG^{3}	Target^{5}
Andre Reed	8	62	0	20	12
Thurman Thomas	5	55	0	15	6
Kenneth Davis	2	23	0	19	2
Keith McKeller	2	11	0	6	5
James Lofton	1	61	0	61	2
Al Edwards	0	0	0	0	2

Giants passing
	C/ATT^{1}	Yds	TD	INT	Rating
Jeff Hostetler	20/32	222	1	0	93.5
Giants rushing
	Car^{2}	Yds	TD	LG^{3}	Yds/Car
Ottis Anderson	21	102	1	24	4.86
Dave Meggett	9	48	0	17	5.33
Maurice Carthon	3	12	0	5	4.00
Jeff Hostetler	6	10	0	5	1.67
Giants receiving
	Rec^{4}	Yds	TD	LG^{3}	Target^{5}
Mark Ingram	5	74	0	22	7
Mark Bavaro	5	50	0	19	6
Howard Cross	4	39	0	13	5
Stephen Baker	2	31	1	17	4
Dave Meggett	2	18	0	11	3
Ottis Anderson	1	7	0	7	1
Maurice Carthon	1	3	0	3	2
Troy Kyles	0	0	0	0	1

^{1}Completions/attempts ^{2}Carries ^{3}Long gain ^{4}Receptions ^{5}Times targeted

=== Records set ===
Super Bowl XXV was the first Super Bowl where no new player records were set. Three players tied a record. One single team record was set according to the official NFL.com boxscore, the 2022 NFL Record & Fact Book and the Pro-Football-Reference.com game summary.

Player and Team Records Set
Smallest margin of victory	1 point	Giants
Records Tied
Most safeties, game	1	Bruce Smith
Most fair catches, game	3	Al Edwards (Buffalo); David Meggett (New York)
Most safeties, game	1	Bills
Fewest passing touchdowns	0	Bills
Fewest punt returns, game	0	Bills
Fewest turnovers, game	0	Bills; Giants

Turnovers are defined as the number of times losing the ball on interceptions and fumbles.

Records Set, both team totals
	Total	Bills	Giants
Fewest times intercepted	0	0	0
Fewest Turnovers	0	0	0
Records tied, both team totals
Fewest fumbles lost	0	0	0
Fewest punt returns, game	2	0	2

== Starting lineups ==
Hall of Fame‡

Buffalo	Position	Position	New York
Offense
James Lofton‡	WR		Mark Ingram
Will Wolford	LT		Jumbo Elliott
Jim Ritcher	LG		William Roberts
Kent Hull	C		Bart Oates
John Davis	RG		Eric Moore
Howard Ballard	RT		Doug Riesenberg
Keith McKeller	TE		Mark Bavaro
Andre Reed‡	WR		Stephen Baker
Jim Kelly‡	QB		Jeff Hostetler
Thurman Thomas‡	RB		Ottis Anderson
Jamie Mueller	FB		Maurice Carthon
Defense
Leon Seals	LE		Eric Dorsey
Jeff Wright	NT		Erik Howard
Bruce Smith‡	RE		Leonard Marshall
Cornelius Bennett	LOLB		Carl Banks
Shane Conlan	LILB		Gary Reasons
Ray Bentley	RILB		Pepper Johnson
Darryl Talley	ROLB		Lawrence Taylor‡
Kirby Jackson	LCB		Mark Collins
Nate Odomes	RCB		Everson Walls
Leonard Smith	SS		Greg Jackson
Mark Kelso	FS		Myron Guyton

== Officials ==
- Referee: Jerry Seeman #70 second Super Bowl (XXIII); alternate for XIV
- Umpire: Art Demmas #78 third Super Bowl (XIII, XVII)
- Head linesman: Sid Semon #109 first Super Bowl
- Line judge: Dick McKenzie #41 first Super Bowl
- Back judge: Banks Williams #99 first Super Bowl
- Side judge: Larry Nemmers #20 first Super Bowl
- Field judge: Jack Vaughan #93 second Super Bowl (XX)
- Alternate referee: Red Cashion #43 referee for Super Bowl XX
- Alternate umpire: Al Conway #27 umpire for Super Bowls IX, XIV, XVI
  - This would be Jerry Seeman's final game as an on-field referee, as the following season he would replace longtime Director of Officiating Art McNally upon the latter's retirement.
  - Side judge Larry Nemmers was promoted to referee for 1991 and remained a crew chief through 2007.

== In popular culture ==
The game, including the missed field goal at the end, is mentioned in a conversation in the campaign mode of Call of Duty: Black Ops 6 in a mission that took place 6 days later.

In "The Tenth Anniversary," a 2000 episode of Everybody Loves Raymond, Debra discovers that Ray accidentally used their wedding tape to record the game.

== See also ==
- Buffalo '66

== Sources ==
- Super Bowl XXV: NFL Full Game on YouTube
- 2006 NFL Record and Fact Book. Time Inc. Home Entertainment. July 25, 2006. ISBN 1-933405-32-5.
- Total Football II: The Official Encyclopedia of the National Football League. HarperCollins. July 25, 2006. ISBN 1-933405-32-5.
- The Sporting News Complete Super Bowl Book 1995. Sporting News. February 1995. ISBN 0-89204-523-X.
- Pro Football Statistics and History – Large online database of NFL data and statistics
- Super Bowl play-by-plays from USA Today (Last accessed September 28, 2005)
- Super Bowl XXV Box Score at Pro Football Reference
