= Super Bowl XXVI =

1992 edition of the Super Bowl

Washington Redskins (1) (NFC) (14–2)	Buffalo Bills (1) (AFC) (13–3)
37	24
Head coach: Joe Gibbs	Head coach: Marv Levy
	1	2	3	4	Total
WAS	0	17	14	6	37
BUF	0	0	10	14	24
- Date: January 26, 1992
- Kickoff time: 5:25 p.m. CST (UTC-6)
- Stadium: Hubert H. Humphrey Metrodome; Minneapolis, Minnesota
- MVP: Mark Rypien, quarterback
- Favorite: Redskins by 7
- Referee: Jerry Markbreit
- Attendance: 63,130

Ceremonies
- National anthem: Harry Connick Jr.
- Coin toss: Chuck Noll
- Halftime show: Gloria Estefan, Brian Boitano, Dorothy Hamill, and the Minnesota Marching Band

TV in the United States
- Network: CBS
- Announcers: Pat Summerall, John Madden, Lesley Visser, Pat O'Brien, and Jim Gray
- Nielsen ratings: 40.3 (est. 79.6 million viewers)
- Market share: 61
- Cost of 30-second commercial: $850,000

Radio in the United States
- Network: CBS Radio
- Announcers: Jack Buck and Hank Stram

Super Bowl XXVI was an American football game between the National Football Conference (NFC) champion Washington Redskins and the American Football Conference (AFC) champion Buffalo Bills to decide the National Football League (NFL) champion for the 1991 season. The Redskins defeated the Bills by a score of 37–24, becoming the fourth team after the Pittsburgh Steelers, the now Las Vegas Raiders and the San Francisco 49ers to win three Super Bowls. The Bills became the third team, after the Minnesota Vikings (Super Bowls VIII and IX) and the Denver Broncos (Super Bowls XXI and XXII) to lose back-to-back Super Bowls. The game was played on January 26, 1992, at the Hubert H. Humphrey Metrodome in Minneapolis, Minnesota, the first time the city played host to a Super Bowl.

Both teams finished the regular season with the best record in their respective conferences. The Redskins posted a 14–2 regular season record, and led the league during the regular season with 485 points. Washington head coach Joe Gibbs entered the game seeking his third Super Bowl victory with the team, but with his third starting Super Bowl quarterback, Mark Rypien. The Bills finished the regular season with a 13–3 record and advanced to their second consecutive Super Bowl, largely through the play of quarterback Jim Kelly and their "K-Gun" no-huddle offense. However, their defense ranked second to last in the league in total yards allowed.

Super Bowl XXVI was dominated by Washington. Early in the second quarter, the Redskins jumped out to a 17–0 lead from which the Bills could not recover. Washington also sacked Kelly four times and intercepted him four times. Rypien, who completed 18 of 33 passes for 292 yards, two touchdowns and an interception, was named Super Bowl MVP.

The telecast of the game on CBS was seen by an estimated 79.6 million viewers. This was the first time that a major television network successfully scheduled Super Bowl counterprogramming: Fox aired a special live football-themed episode of its popular sketch comedy show In Living Color during the halftime show.

== Background ==
=== Host selection process ===
NFL owners voted to award Super Bowl XXVI to Minneapolis during their May 24, 1989, meeting in New Orleans. Indianapolis (Hoosier Dome), Detroit (Pontiac Silverdome), and Seattle (Kingdome) also made bids for the game. Indianapolis' unsuccessful bid had seen the city offer the league perks such as free suites at and free limousine rides to the 1992 Indianapolis 500.

Super Bowl XXVI became the second Super Bowl to be played in a cold, winter climate city. The first one was Super Bowl XVI on January 24, 1982, at the Silverdome in Pontiac, Michigan, a suburb of Detroit. Temperatures in Minneapolis on game day were a high of 26 °F (−3 °C) and low of 9 °F (−13 °C), about 2 °F (1.1 °C) above average. This and Super Bowl LII, played at the Metrodome's replacement U.S. Bank Stadium, remain the northernmost Super Bowls ever played.

The Metrodome also hosted the 1992 NCAA Men's Basketball Final Four, making it the only stadium to host both events in the same calendar year. It also hosted the 1991 World Series as the Twins defeated the Braves. Minneapolis is the only city, and the Metrodome is the only venue, to host all three events in a 12-month span (all three of these events aired on CBS, who would go on to purchase their Twin Cities affiliate, WCCO-TV, later in the year). The Metrodome was the smallest stadium to ever host the Super Bowl in terms of capacity. Stadium representatives insisted they were planning to rectify the shortage of capacity by adding temporary seating. However, they accomplished it mostly by converting existing chair-back seats to bench seats. When the NFL found out about that plan, they did not approve. However, by then it was too late to move the game elsewhere. The attendance mark of 63,130 was second-lowest at the time (following the first Super Bowl's attendance of 61,946). It is now the 4th-lowest in history, behind LV (24,835), LVIII (61,629), and Super Bowl I.

=== Washington Redskins ===
Washington entered Super Bowl XXVI leading the league during the regular season in scoring with 485 points, while allowing the second-fewest points (224). The team was led by Mark Rypien, head coach Joe Gibbs' third different starting Super Bowl quarterback. Rypien led the NFC during the regular season in passing yards (3,564) and touchdown passes (28). With 249 out of 421 completions and only 11 interceptions, he earned the second-highest passer rating in the league (97.9).

Rypien had several great targets to whom he could throw. Wide receiver Gary Clark was the main deep threat on the team, catching 70 passes for 1,340 yards and 10 touchdowns. On the other side of the field, wide receiver Art Monk, playing in his 12th NFL season, was just as reliable, catching 71 passes for 1,049 yards and 8 touchdowns. Monk's 71 receptions in 1991 gave him a career total of 801, just 18 behind the all-time record held by Steve Largent. Wide receiver Ricky Sanders was also a big element of the passing game, catching 45 passes for 580 yards and 5 touchdowns.

The Redskins' primary weapon in the backfield was running back Earnest Byner, who ranked 5th in the NFL with 1,048 rushing yards, while also catching 34 passes for 308 yards and scoring 5 touchdowns. Rookie running back Ricky Ervins was also a major asset to the running attack, rushing 145 times for 680 yards for an average of 4.7 yards per carry, while also catching 16 passes for 181 yards. And when Washington was near the goal line, they usually relied on fullback Gerald Riggs, who rushed for 248 yards and scored 11 touchdowns. The Redskins' offensive line, known as "The Hogs", was led by Pro Bowl tackle Jim Lachey and guard Mark Schlereth, along with four-time Pro Bowl veterans Russ Grimm and Joe Jacoby. The Hogs allowed the fewest sacks in the league with just 9, 10 sacks less than the team that allowed the second-fewest. Even Washington's special teams unit was a big threat. Running back Brian Mitchell led the NFL in punt return yards (600) and punt return touchdowns (2) with a 13.3 yards per return average, while also gaining 583 yards returning kickoffs. Kicker Chip Lohmiller made the pro bowl, leading the league in fields goals (31) and extra points (56) made.

Washington's defense, which ranked third in the NFL in fewest yards allowed (4,638), was led by All-Pro defensive back Darrell Green, who was one of the fastest players in the NFL, and Pro Bowl linebacker Wilber Marshall. Green and Marshall recorded 5 interceptions each, with Marshall recording 75 return yards and a touchdown, while also compiling 5.5 sacks and forcing 4 fumbles. Safety Brad Edwards was also a big factor in the secondary, recording four interceptions. Up front, their line was anchored by defensive end Charles Mann, who recorded 11 of Washington's 50 sacks, and recovered a fumble. Defensive end Fred Stokes also made a big impact with 6.5 sacks, 2 fumble recoveries, and an interception.

The Redskins stormed to a league-best 14–2 regular season record. After crushing the Detroit Lions 45–0 on opening day, they recorded 11 consecutive wins before suffering their first loss to the Dallas Cowboys, 24–21. Their only other defeat was a meaningless loss to the Philadelphia Eagles in the final game of the regular season in which they rested most of their starters because they had already clinched the #1 NFC playoff seed.

=== Buffalo Bills ===
The Bills' no-huddle "K-Gun" offense once again dominated the league by gaining an NFL-leading 6,525 yards and scoring 458 points, second only to Washington. The leaders of the offense, quarterback Jim Kelly and running back Thurman Thomas, both had the best seasons of their careers. Kelly completed 64.1 percent of his passes for 3,844 yards and a league-leading 33 touchdowns, with only 17 interceptions, to give him a 97.6 passer rating. Thomas rushed for 1,407 yards, caught 62 passes for 620 yards, and scored 12 touchdowns to earn him both the NFL Offensive Player of the Year Award and the NFL Most Valuable Player Award. With 2,067 yards from scrimmage, Thomas led the league in that category for the third consecutive season. Just like Washington, Buffalo had more than one threat in their backfield. Running back Kenneth Davis emerged as a big threat, rushing for 624 yards, catching 20 passes for 118 yards, and scoring 5 touchdowns.

The Bills also had several major weapons in their passing game. Wide receiver Andre Reed led the team with 81 receptions for 1,113 yards and 10 touchdowns, and also rushed 12 times for 136 yards. On the other side of the field, veteran wide receiver James Lofton recorded 57 receptions for 1,072 yards and 8 touchdowns to earn his 8th Pro Bowl appearance and finished the year just 55 yards short of the all-time receiving yardage record, held by Steve Largent (13,089 yards). Pro Bowl tight end Keith McKeller was also a big contributor with 44 receptions for 434 yards, while receiver Don Beebe had 32 catches, 414 yards, and 6 touchdowns. Once again, the Bills' offensive line was led by center Kent Hull, along with left tackle Will Wolford and Pro Bowl left guard Jim Ritcher.

But the Bills had big problems on their defense. Buffalo ranked just 27th (out of 28 teams) in yards allowed, 19th in points allowed, and recorded only 31 sacks. A reason for this was that defensive linemen Bruce Smith and Jeff Wright had missed most of the season with injuries. One of the few bright spots on the Bills' defense was Pro Bowl linebacker Cornelius Bennett, who recorded 78 tackles, 9 sacks, and 2 fumble recoveries. Another Pro Bowl linebacker, Darryl Talley, led the team with 90 tackles and 5 interceptions, while also recovering 2 fumbles and forcing 4. Cornerback Nate Odomes was the leader of the secondary with 5 interceptions, which he returned for 120 yards and a touchdown, along with 66 tackles and a fumble recovery.

Despite their defensive problems, the Bills finished the season with an AFC-best 13–3 regular season record.

=== Playoffs ===
The Redskins first defeated the Atlanta Falcons, 24–7, in a rain-soaked playoff game that was closer than their 56–17 regular season win over Atlanta. Rypien had 442 passing yards and 6 touchdowns in the earlier game, but could only complete 14 out of 28 passes for 170 yards and no touchdowns in the rematch. Still, Washington dominated the Falcons again by forcing 6 turnovers and rushing for 162 yards. The Redskins held the ball for over 36 minutes while running back Ricky Ervins recorded 104 rushing yards and a touchdown.

Then Washington crushed the Detroit Lions 41–10 in the NFC Championship Game. The Lions posted a 12–4 regular season record and were coming off a 38–6 playoff blowout over the Dallas Cowboys. Many sports writers predicted that the NFC Championship Game would be much closer than the Redskins' win over the Lions in the season opening game because Detroit's future Hall of Fame running back, Barry Sanders, did not play in it due to injury. He had recorded 1,548 rushing yards and 16 touchdowns in the remaining 15 games of the season, and 99 combined rushing and receiving yards against Dallas in the playoffs. However, the Redskins crushed Detroit in this game as well, quickly forcing two Lions turnovers and building up a 10–0 lead before the game was five minutes old. The Redskins scored 41 points off of two touchdown runs by Riggs, two field goals from kicker Chip Lohmiller, a pair of touchdown passes from Rypien to Monk and Clark, and Green's 32-yard 4th-quarter interception return for a touchdown. Sanders was held to just 59 total yards, and linebacker Wilber Marshall sacked Lions quarterback Erik Kramer three times.

Meanwhile, the Bills first defeated the Kansas City Chiefs 37–14, avenging a 33–6 Monday night loss during the regular season, in which the Chiefs recorded six sacks, recovered five fumbles, and gained 239 rushing yards, with running backs Harvey Williams and Christian Okoye recording over 100 rushing yards each. During this playoff game, the Bills jumped to a 24–0 lead in the 3rd quarter, with Kelly throwing three touchdown passes, the first two to Reed and the third to Lofton. The Bills also got a big performance out of Thomas, who rushed for over 100 yards, and kicker Scott Norwood, who made three field goals. Meanwhile, unconcerned with Kansas City's weak passing game, Buffalo played Bennett and Talley close to the line of scrimmage on nearly every play to stuff the run. Both players combined for 13 tackles, while the Bills' defense held Kansas City to 77 yards on the ground. Chiefs running back Barry Word, who became their primary rusher since the Monday Night game and rushed for over 100 yards in each of Kansas City's previous three games, was limited to just 50 yards. In addition, Buffalo's defense knocked Chiefs quarterback Steve DeBerg out of the game and intercepted backup quarterback Mark Vlasic four times.

Buffalo then played against the Denver Broncos, who were coming off a 26–24 win over the Houston Oilers, in which quarterback John Elway led them on an 87-yard drive to set up kicker David Treadwell's game-winning field goal with only 16 seconds left. It was predicted that this AFC Championship Game would be a shootout between the Bills' powerful offense and the superb postseason play of Elway. But neither Elway nor the Bills' offense had much success in the 10–7 Bills victory in a game totally dominated by defense. Bennett, who spent almost as much time in the Denver backfield as Elway, had another great game, constantly pressuring Elway, sharing one sack, and tackling Denver rushers behind the line of scrimmage three times. Bills linebacker Carlton Bailey also made a big impact late in the 3rd quarter, intercepting a screen pass from Elway and returning it 11 yards for Buffalo's only touchdown of the game. After backup quarterback Gary Kubiak scored Denver's only touchdown with less than two minutes to go, the Bills then clinched the victory when defensive back Kirby Jackson forced and recovered a fumble from running back Steve Sewell on Denver's final drive of the game. Treadwell's three missed field goals were a large factor in the outcome of the defensive struggle.

=== Super Bowl pregame news ===
During the week leading to Super Bowl XXVI, it seemed most of the pressure was on the Bills. The AFC Championship Game appeared to be the best defensive effort by Buffalo all season, as they held the Broncos to only a touchdown, while also limiting Elway to just 11 of 21 completions for 121 yards and no touchdowns, with one interception. But the Bills' high-powered offense was completely shut down, limited to just a single field goal for the entire game. In addition, the Bills could have easily been eliminated by the Broncos, had Treadwell not missed three field goal attempts, two of which hit the uprights. The performance also gave an opportunity for Gibbs and the Redskins' coaches to devise a strong game plan to exploit their Super Bowl opponent's weaknesses.

"Denver was successful being aggressive. That may have aided us a little bit in our thinking," said Redskins defensive coordinator Richie Petitibon. "Looking at them before they had played Denver, we kind of thought you had to put pressure on this guy (Jim Kelly). We attacked the line of scrimmage more than usual. We wanted to blitz to stop the run early in the game. It's sometimes tough to pick up blitzes against the running game."

Redskins linebacker Matt Millen was bidding to become the first player to play in a Super Bowl victory for three different franchises (he played in Super Bowl XV and Super Bowl XVIII with the Raiders, and Super Bowl XXIV with the 49ers). However, Millen was deactivated for the game and watched from the Redskins sideline. He retired from the NFL shortly after the game to pursue a career in broadcasting (and later as a team executive).

During the CBS telecast, it was mentioned that Leonard Smith (the Bills' regular starting strong safety) couldn't play as a result of an infection in his knee.

Bills defensive line coach Chuck Dickerson mocked the Washington Redskins' famed offensive line, "The Hogs" in a television interview. Dickerson said Redskins tackle Joe Jacoby was "a Neanderthal – he slobbers a lot, he probably kicks dogs in his neighborhood." He also said tackle Jim Lachey "has bad breath. Players will fall down without him even touching them." Redskins coach Joe Gibbs got his hands on some tapes of Dickerson and played them at a team meeting on the night before the game. (Levy fired Dickerson three days after the game.)

As the designated home team in the annual rotation between AFC and NFC teams, the Bills elected to wear their home blue uniforms with white pants; the Redskins therefore wore white uniforms with burgundy pants, which was their own home preference at the time.

This was Jerry Markbreit's third Super Bowl as the game's referee (having previously officiated Super Bowls XVII and XXI) tying the record set by Norm Schachter (I, V, and X), Jim Tunney (VI, XI, and XII), and Pat Haggerty (XIII, XVI, and XIX).

Off the field, Super Bowl XXVI was also the site of a protest led by the American Indian Movement. Attended by about 2,000 protestors, the demonstration was intended to pressure Redskins management into changing the team's name, which some found offensive. The team would remove the name Redskins in the 2020 season, thus making Super Bowl XXVI the last Super Bowl appearance for Washington under the franchise's old nickname (should Washington advance to any future Super Bowls, it will be as the Washington Commanders).

== Broadcasting ==
The game was broadcast in the United States by CBS, and featured the broadcast team of play-by-play announcer Pat Summerall and color commentator John Madden for the fifth time. Lesley Visser, Jim Gray, and Pat O'Brien reported on the sidelines; Visser would later preside over the presentation of the Lombardi Trophy to the Redskins, becoming the first woman to do so. The Super Bowl Today was hosted by Greg Gumbel and Terry Bradshaw with Randy Cross and Dan Fouts contributing team reports, and Visser, Madden, Jim Gray, Bernard Goldberg and Mike Francesa (among others) contributing feature segments.

This would be the last Super Bowl to air on CBS until Super Bowl XXXV at the end of the 2000 season. CBS lost the NFC package to Fox following the 1993 season, leaving CBS without the NFL until it acquired the AFC package from NBC for the 1998 season. Super Bowl XXVI was not originally in CBS' rotation: since it had just broadcast Super Bowl XXIV two years earlier, CBS would have received Super Bowl XXVII as part of the rotation while NBC would have aired Super Bowl XXVI. Instead, the NFL made an exception for CBS, which had acquired the rights to the 1992 Winter Olympics (which started 13 days later), and allowed CBS to air the Super Bowl as a lead-in program for its Olympics coverage.

For this game, as they had done for Super Bowl XXIV, CBS debuted a new theme and opening for its NFL coverage. Composed by Frankie Vinci, the theme was used for the next two seasons on television and on CBS Radio after that; several remixes of the song were used from the time CBS resumed covering NFL games in 1998 until the end of the 2002 season; after that, CBS began using an E.S. Posthumus composition and has used it ever since. In addition, CBS also rolled out a new network-wide graphics package for its sports coverage. With a few minor tweaks, the red, white, and blue graphic displays stayed in place until 1996, when CBS rolled out a new orange and yellow package. "Willing and Able" by Prince was then used in a video montage during the closing credits of CBS' coverage.

Also, this game was part of a broadcasting service test commissioned by the U.S. Navy. The ships participating were the USS America; USS Concord; USS Eisenhower; USS Inchon; USS Monterey; USS Normandy and the USS Sierra.

Following the game was a 60 Minutes interview with future President Bill and Hillary Clinton and an episode of 48 Hours.

Super Bowl XXVI was telecast in over 100 countries around the world, including Australia (Network Ten), Canada (CTV), Mexico (Canal 13) and the United Kingdom (Channel 4).

=== In popular culture ===
Super Bowl XXVI was featured in the episode of The Simpsons entitled "Lisa the Greek", which aired three days prior to the game, and correctly predicted that Washington would win.

In January reruns of the episode in 1993 and 1994, the dialogue was redubbed so that Lisa would correctly predict the Dallas Cowboys winning Super Bowls XXVII and XXVIII.

== Entertainment ==
=== Pregame ceremonies ===
The pregame show featured local Minnesota youth including the Metropolitan Boys Choir, the Minnesota Youth Symphonies, and local marching bands.

Singer Harry Connick Jr. later sang the national anthem. For the first time in Super Bowl History, the anthem was also performed in sign language, with Lori Hilary signing the anthem for the deaf fans. The coin toss ceremony featured Pro Football Hall of Fame head coach Chuck Noll. Noll, former Steelers Hall of Fame head coach who had retired a month earlier after 23 seasons, conducted the coin toss. Noll's Steelers had lost to both of these teams earlier in the season by large margins (52–34 to Buffalo and 41–14 to Washington).

STS-42, a Space Shuttle mission, was in orbit during the game. A live downlink between the Metrodome and Discovery happened during the pregame show. Three of the mission's seven crew members demonstrated a 'human coin toss' in space.

Buffalo head coach Marv Levy stated his famous phrase "Where else would you rather be?" to his players moments before kickoff, as shown on NFL Films highlights.

=== Halftime show ===
The halftime show was titled "Winter Magic", and featured a celebration to the winter season and the Winter Olympics. The halftime show was produced by Timberline Productions.

Nearly 2,000 performers were involved in the show. The show featured drill teams, professional dancers (including ballroom dancing couples), the 60-piece Minnesota Youth Symphonies, color guards and drill teams from area high schools, and rollerbladers. In addition, Pride of Minnesota marching band performed, former Olympic champions Brian Boitano and Dorothy Hamill skated. Singer Gloria Estefan performed during the show's finale.

The performance began with a 30-second overture, leading into an introduction by Brian Boitano and Dorothy Hamill, welcoming viewers to Minnesota, “where winter’s the hottest time of the year.” This was followed by the original composition "Winter Magic". Performers on the field spelled out the word "winter" followed by the word "magic". This was followed by "Walking in a Winter Wonderland", followed by a rendition of "Dance of the Sugar Plum Fairy".

This was followed by "Frosty", an original composition involving rapping based on the character described in the song Frosty the Snowman. During this performance two 30-foot inflatable snowman figures were inflated, and dancing snowman figures were also utilized. The University of Minnesota Marching Band took the field during this song.

This was followed by a salute to the 1992 Winter Olympics athletes, with Brian Boitano and Dorothy Hamill skating to the song "One Moment in Time", on sheets of Teflon that were embedded on the tops of large platforms that were placed on the field for the show. After they finished their skating performance, the tribute to Olympians continued to the song "Don't Stop Me Now". Members of the 1980 United States Men's Olympic Ice Hockey Team took stage for this tribute, holding sparklers. Rollerbladers also took part in this segment of the performance. Boitano and Hamill left the field on a snowmobile.

Gloria Estefan then took the stage, and performed her songs "Live for Loving You" and "Get on Your Feet". The show then concluded with a reprise of the "Winter Magic" song. Estefan would later perform at the halftime show for Super Bowl XXXIII which was held in her hometown of Miami.

==== Counter-programming by In Living Color ====
To compete with the halftime show, Fox decided to broadcast a special live episode of In Living Color and was able to attract and keep Super Bowl viewers. As a result, in order to retain Super Bowl viewership, it was decided that Michael Jackson would perform at halftime during Super Bowl XXVII, followed by more big-name talent during subsequent Super Bowl halftimes.

== Game summary ==
=== First quarter ===
Both teams entered the game as the two highest scoring teams in the league, but after the end of the first quarter, both of them would be scoreless.

The game started with a parade of miscues by both teams. First, the opening kickoff had to be redone because Bills kicker Brad Daluiso kicked the ball before referee Jerry Markbreit signaled to begin play. Then after Washington was forced to punt on their opening possession, Bills running back Thurman Thomas missed the first two plays of Buffalo's first drive because he misplaced his helmet.

After an exchange of punts to start the game, Washington drove 87 yards, the majority of which came from quarterback Mark Rypien's four passes to wide receiver Art Monk for a total gain of 79 yards. Monk's fourth reception was for a 31-yard gain, in which he caught the ball at the Buffalo 27-yard line, and subsequently broke a tackle by cornerback Kirby Jackson, but was forced out of bounds at the 2-yard line by safety Mark Kelso. The Bills' defense then stiffened to keep the Redskins out of the end zone. After running back Gerald Riggs was stopped for no gain on two rushing attempts, Rypien appeared to complete a 2-yard touchdown pass to Monk. However, instant replay determined that after Monk caught the ball, his right foot stepped out of bounds, deeming the pass incomplete, and bringing up fourth down. This was the first time in Super Bowl history that instant replay was used to overturn a touchdown. Washington then tried to salvage the drive with a 19-yard field goal attempt by kicker Chip Lohmiller, but holder/backup quarterback Jeff Rutledge fumbled the snap, turning the ball over on downs and keeping the game scoreless.

On Buffalo's first play after the botched field goal attempt, quarterback Jim Kelly threw a pass intended for wide receiver Andre Reed that was tipped by Redskins cornerback Darrell Green and intercepted by safety Brad Edwards, who returned it 21 yards to the Buffalo 12-yard line. But three plays after the turnover, the Bills got the ball right back when Rypien threw a pass that was deflected by nose tackle Jeff Wright and intercepted by Jackson. Buffalo also could not capitalize on the turnover and were forced to punt to end the quarter.

=== Second quarter ===
In the second quarter, the Redskins began to take over the game. On their next possession, a 19-yard run by running back Earnest Byner and a 41-yard completion from Rypien to wide receiver Ricky Sanders set up Lohmiller's 34-yard field goal to give Washington a 3–0 lead. The Redskins' defense then forced the Bills to a three-and-out on their ensuing possession, and Chris Mohr's 23-yard punt sailed out of bounds at the Washington 49-yard line. The Redskins then drove 51 yards in 5 plays, which included a 16-yard reception by wide receiver Gary Clark and a roughing the passer penalty on Buffalo linebacker Cornelius Bennett. The drive ended with Rypien's 10-yard touchdown pass to Byner, increasing the Washington lead to 10–0. On the Bills' next drive, Green intercepted a pass from Kelly at the Washington 45-yard line. Three plays later, Rypien completed a 34-yard pass to Clark to reach the Buffalo 15. A 14-yard run by running back Ricky Ervins then set up Riggs' 1-yard touchdown run to extend the Redskins' lead to 17–0.

After the next three possessions ended in punts, Buffalo had a chance to score with 1:46 left in the half. Bills wide receiver Steve Tasker downed Mohr's 48-yard punt at the Redskins 1-yard line. Washington did not gain any net yards during the possession, but narrowly avoided a safety on second down when Wright appeared to tackle Byner in the end zone. However, Byner managed to stretch the ball outside of the end zone before his knee hit the ground, ensuring that the Bills would be kept off the board. After Rypien threw an incomplete pass on third down, Buffalo got the ball back after cornerback Cliff Hicks returned Kelly Goodburn's 42-yard punt 2 yards to the Washington 41-yard line. From there, Kelly completed a 21-yard pass to tight end Keith McKeller to reach the 20. But after an incomplete pass and an 8-yard sack on Kelly by linebacker Wilber Marshall, Edwards broke up a third-down pass intended for Reed in which Edwards hit Reed before the ball got to him; however, no flag for pass interference was thrown. In disgust, Reed threw his helmet to the ground, drawing a mandatory 15-yard unsportsmanlike conduct penalty that took the Bills out of field goal range and forced them to punt. As the teams ran off the field at halftime, Bills head coach Marv Levy confronted field judge Ed Merrifield, whom Levy thought missed the pass interference call and then threw the unsportsmanlike conduct flag against Reed.

The Bills became the ninth team to go scoreless in the first half of a Super Bowl, after the Baltimore Colts in Super Bowl III; the Minnesota Vikings in Super Bowls IV, VIII, IX, and XI; the Redskins in Super Bowl VII, the Denver Broncos in Super Bowl XII; and the Cincinnati Bengals in Super Bowl XVI. All eight of the previous teams ended up losing the game.

=== Third quarter ===
Washington increased their lead to 24–0 just 16 seconds into the second half after linebacker Kurt Gouveia intercepted Kelly's pass on the first play of the third quarter and returned it 23 yards to the Bills' 2-yard line. The blitz that forced Kelly's rushed throw and led to the turnover had been drawn up by the Redskins' defensive coaches on the pregame bus ride to the Metrodome, as they came up with an idea to use their superior speed rushers against the powerful but not-that-mobile interior Bills' offensive line. On the next play, Riggs rushed 2 yards for his second touchdown of the game. The Redskins' 24–0 lead midway through the third quarter tied the Miami Dolphins in Super Bowl VIII for the largest shutout lead in Super Bowl history. It was broken by the Seattle Seahawks' 36–0 lead in Super Bowl XLVIII.

The Bills finally got some momentum going with their next two drives. First, they drove 77 yards to the Redskins 3-yard line, aided by Kelly's two passes to running back Thurman Thomas for 16 yards, a 14-yard reception by wide receiver James Lofton on 3rd-and-10, and a 43-yard reception by wide receiver Don Beebe. Washington kept Buffalo out of the end zone, but kicker Scott Norwood's 21-yard field goal cut the deficit to 24–3. After forcing Washington to punt on their next possession, the Bills drove 56 yards in 6 plays, aided by a 29-yard pass interference penalty on Redskins cornerback Martin Mayhew in the end zone. The Redskins kept the Bills out of the end zone for the first two plays, but Thomas scored the first Buffalo touchdown of the game on a 1-yard run to cut Washington's lead to 24–10.

However, the Bills' hopes of a comeback were dashed when the Redskins advanced 79 yards in 11 plays on their ensuing drive, which included three runs by Ervin for 15 yards, as well as four passes from Rypien to Clark for a total gain of 60 yards, the last of which was for a 30-yard touchdown, giving the Redskins a 31–10 lead with 1:24 left in the third quarter, and essentially sealing their third Super Bowl title. Three plays after receiving the ensuing kickoff, cornerback Alvoid Mays stripped the ball from Kelly, and it was recovered by defensive end Fred Stokes on the Buffalo 14-yard line.

=== Fourth quarter ===
After the turnover, the Redskins drove to the Bills' 7-yard line on a 17-yard reception by Monk and increased their lead to 34–10 on Lohmiller's 25-yard field goal on the second play of the fourth quarter.

On the Bills' ensuing drive, Kelly was sacked for a 9-yard loss by Stokes, then threw an incomplete pass, and then his fourth interception of the game to Edwards, who returned it 35 yards to the Buffalo 33. Five plays later, Lohmiller kicked his third field goal with 11:36 left in the game to increase the Redskins' lead to 37–10. Now comfortable with their lead, the Washington defense began to take it easy on the Buffalo offense. The Bills managed to respond with a 15-play, 79-yard drive, which featured a 15-yard penalty on Mays for delivering a late hit on Lofton, two receptions and a run by Thomas for 14 yards, a 17-yard catch by Lofton, an 11-yard reception by wide receiver Al Edwards, and two receptions by running back Kenneth Davis for 15 yards. The drive ended with Kelly's 2-yard touchdown pass to tight end Pete Metzelaars to cut the Buffalo deficit to 37–17. Then, after recovering an onside kick, the Bills drove 50 yards, aided by two runs and a reception by Davis for a total of 28 yards, as well as an 18-yard pass interference penalty on Mays. Kelly then threw a 4-yard touchdown pass to Beebe to make the score 37–24, but by then, only 3:55 remained in the game. Buffalo's second onside kick attempt was unsuccessful, and Washington reached the Buffalo 22-yard line to run the clock down to 25 seconds before turning the ball over on downs. From there, the Bills attempted one final pass play before the game ended.

Kelly completed 28 of a Super Bowl–record 58 passes for 275 yards and two touchdowns, but was sacked four times, intercepted four times, and lost a fumble. Thomas ran for only 13 yards on 10 carries and was limited to 27 yards on four receptions. James Lofton was the top receiver for the Bills with 7 catches for 92 yards, but Reed was limited to just 5 catches for 31 yards. Clark had seven catches for 114 yards and a touchdown and Monk added seven for 113 yards (Clark and Monk became the third pair of teammates to each have 100 yards receiving in a Super Bowl; they joined the Steelers' John Stallworth and Lynn Swann, who did it in Super Bowl XIII and the Bengals' Cris Collinsworth and Dan Ross, who did it in Super Bowl XVI).

Ervins was the top rusher of the game with 72 yards. Byner recorded 49 rushing yards, and 3 receptions for 24 yards and a touchdown. On defense, Edwards recorded four tackles, broke up five passes, and returned two interceptions for 56 yards. The Redskins amassed 417 yards of total offense while limiting the explosive Bills to 283, with just 43 rushing yards.

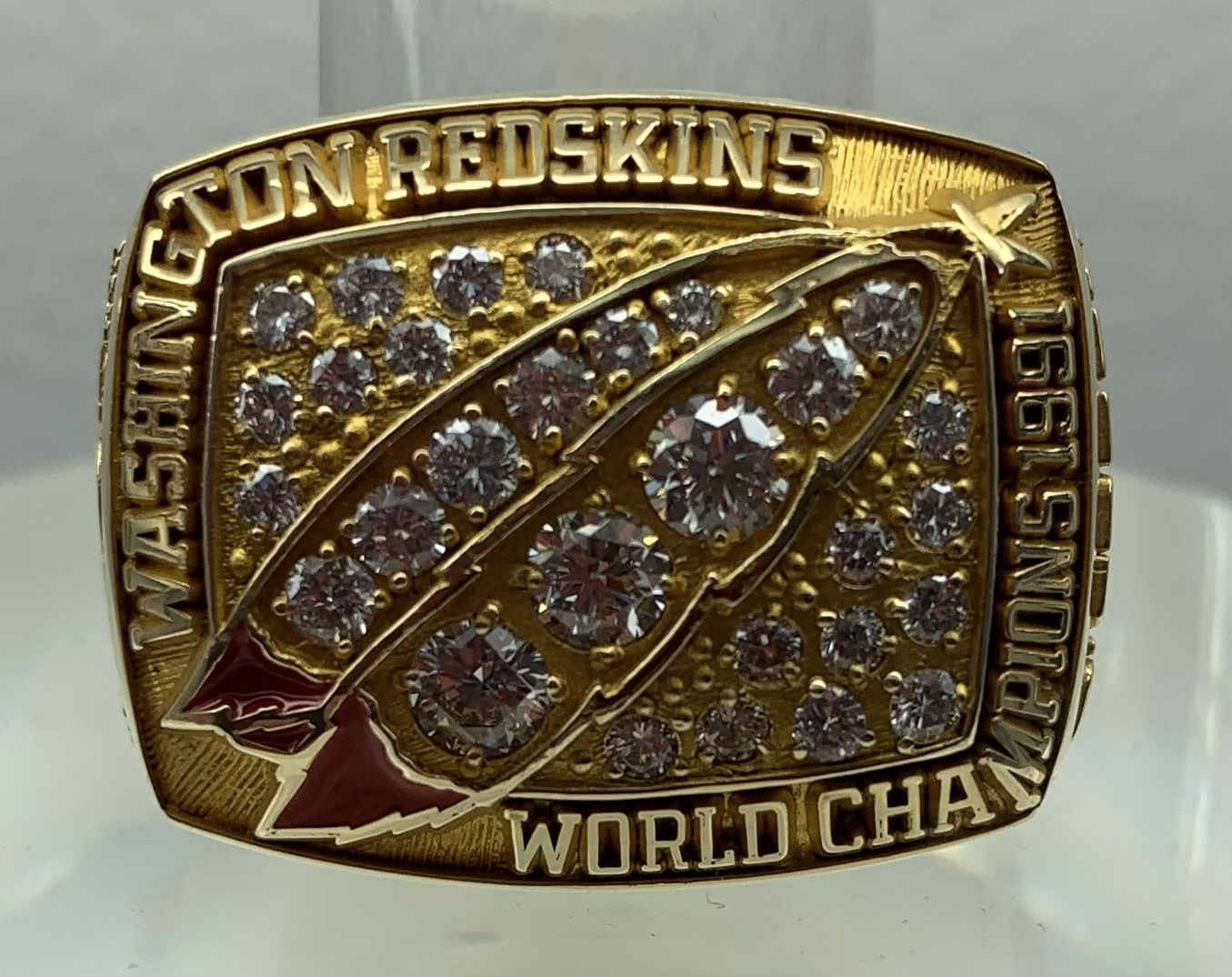
Washington's Super Bowl XXVI ring

The two teams combined for the most points in a 3rd quarter in Super Bowl history (24 total points: 14 for Washington and 10 for Buffalo) and the most combined in a second half (44 total points: 24 for Buffalo and 20 for Washington).

With the win, the Redskins became the first team, and Joe Gibbs the first coach, to win a Super Bowl with three different quarterbacks. Two other teams have since duplicated this feat: the New York Giants (Phil Simms in Super Bowl XXI, Jeff Hostetler in Super Bowl XXV, and Eli Manning in Super Bowls XLII and XLVI) and the Green Bay Packers (Bart Starr in the first two Super Bowls, Brett Favre in Super Bowl XXXI, and Aaron Rodgers in Super Bowl XLV).

This was the last major professional championship won by a D.C.-based team until the Capitals won the 2018 Stanley Cup. This was also the last game for Washington guard Russ Grimm.

=== Box score ===
Super Bowl XXVI: Washington Redskins 37, Buffalo Bills 24

Quarter	1	2	3	4	Total
Redskins (NFC)	0	17	14	6	37
Bills (AFC)	0	0	10	14	24

at Hubert H. Humphrey Metrodome, Minneapolis, Minnesota

- Date: January 26, 1992
- Game time: 5:25 p.m. CST
- Game weather: 73 °F (23 °C), played indoors, domed stadium

Scoring summary

Quarter	Time	Drive			Team	Scoring information	Score	
Quarter	Time	Plays	Yards	TOP	Team	Scoring information	WAS	BUF
2	13:02	7	64	2:40	WAS	34-yard field goal by Chip Lohmiller	3	0
2	9:54	5	51	2:12	WAS	Earnest Byner 10-yard touchdown reception from Mark Rypien, Lohmiller kick good	10	0
2	7:17	5	55	2:18	WAS	Gerald Riggs 1-yard touchdown run, Lohmiller kick good	17	0
3	14:44	1	2	0:03	WAS	Riggs 2-yard touchdown run, Lohmiller kick good	24	0
3	11:59	11	77	2:45	BUF	21-yard field goal by Scott Norwood	24	3
3	5:58	6	56	2:19	BUF	Thurman Thomas 1-yard touchdown run, Norwood kick good	24	10
3	1:24	11	79	4:34	WAS	Gary Clark 30-yard touchdown reception from Rypien, Lohmiller kick good	31	10
4	14:54	4	7	0:57	WAS	25-yard field goal by Lohmiller	34	10
4	11:36	5	11	2:30	WAS	39-yard field goal by Lohmiller	37	10
4	5:59	15	79	5:37	BUF	Pete Metzelaars 2-yard touchdown reception from Jim Kelly, Norwood kick good	37	17
4	3:55	9	50	2:04	BUF	Don Beebe 4-yard touchdown reception from Kelly, Norwood kick good	37	24
"TOP" = time of possession. For other American football terms, see Glossary of American football.							37	24

== Final statistics ==
Sources: NFL.com Super Bowl XXVI, Super Bowl XXVI Play Finder Was, Super Bowl XXVI Play Finder Buf

=== Statistical comparison ===
	Washington Redskins	Buffalo Bills
First downs	24	25
First downs rushing	10	4
First downs passing	12	18
First downs penalty	2	3
Third down efficiency	6/16	7/17
Fourth down efficiency	0/2	2/2
Net yards rushing	125	43
Rushing attempts	40	18
Yards per rush	3.1	2.4
Passing – Completions/attempts	18/33	29/59
Times sacked–total yards	0–0	5–46
Interceptions thrown	1	4
Net yards passing	292	240
Total net yards	417	283
Punt returns–total yards	0–0	3–9
Kickoff returns–total yards	1–16	4–77
Interceptions–total return yards	4–79	1–4
Punts–average yardage	4–37.5	6–35.0
Fumbles–lost	1–0	6–1
Penalties–total yards	5–82	6–50
Time of possession	33:43	26:17
Turnovers	1	5

=== Individual leaders ===
Redskins passing
	C/ATT^{1}	Yds	TD	INT	Rating
Mark Rypien	18/33	292	2	1	92.0
Redskins rushing
	Car^{2}	Yds	TD	LG^{3}	Yds/Car
Ricky Ervins	13	72	0	21	5.54
Earnest Byner	14	49	0	19	3.50
Gerald Riggs	5	7	2	4	1.40
Ricky Sanders	1	1	0	1	1.00
Jeff Rutledge	1	0	0	0	0.00
Mark Rypien	6	–4	0	2	–0.67
Redskins receiving
	Rec^{4}	Yds	TD	LG^{3}	Target^{5}
Gary Clark	7	114	1	34	12
Art Monk	7	113	0	31	10
Earnest Byner	3	24	1	10	5
Ricky Sanders	1	41	0	41	3
Terry Orr	0	0	0	0	1

Bills passing
	C/ATT^{1}	Yds	TD	INT	Rating
Jim Kelly	28/58	275	2	4	44.8
Frank Reich	1/1	11	0	0	112.5
Bills rushing
	Car^{2}	Yds	TD	LG^{3}	Yds/Car
Kenneth Davis	4	17	0	13	4.25
Jim Kelly	3	16	0	9	5.33
Thurman Thomas	10	13	1	6	1.30
James Lofton	1	–3	0	–3	–3.00
Bills receiving
	Rec^{4}	Yds	TD	LG^{3}	Target^{5}
James Lofton	7	92	0	18	17
Andre Reed	5	34	0	12	11
Don Beebe	4	61	1	43	9
Kenneth Davis	4	38	0	12	6
Thurman Thomas	4	27	0	8	5
Keith McKeller	2	29	0	21	5
Al Edwards	1	11	0	11	2
Pete Metzelaars	1	2	1	2	2
Jim Kelly	1	–8	0	–8	1

^{1}Completions/attempts ^{2}Carries ^{3}Long gain ^{4}Receptions ^{5}Times targeted

=== Records set ===
The following records were set in Super Bowl XXVI, according to the official NFL.com boxscore and the ProFootball reference.com game summary.

Player records set
Most passing attempts, game	58	Jim Kelly (Buffalo)
Records tied
Most interceptions thrown, game	4	Jim Kelly (Buffalo)
Most fumbles, game	3	Jim Kelly (Buffalo)
Most rushing touchdowns, game	2	Gerald Riggs (Washington)

Team records set
Most passing attempts	59	Bills
Most first downs, passing	18	Bills
Fewest kickoff returns yards gained	16	Redskins
Records tied
Most consecutive Super Bowl losses	2	Bills
Fewest points, first half	0	Bills
Most points, fourth quarter	14	Bills
Most passes completed	29	Bills
Most fumbles, game	6	Bills
Fewest times sacked	0	Redskins
Most interceptions by	4	Redskins
Fewest kickoff returns, game	1	Redskins
Fewest punt returns, game	0	Redskins

Records set, both team totals
	Total	Redskins	Bills
Most points scored, second half	44	20	24
Most points, third quarter	24	14	10
Most passing attempts	92	33	59
Fewest punt return yards gained	9	0	9
Records tied, both team totals
Fewest kickoff returns	5	1	4

== Starting lineups ==
Hall of Fame ‡

Washington	Position		Buffalo
Offense
Gary Clark	WR		James Lofton‡
Ron Middleton	TE		Pete Metzelaars
Jim Lachey	LT		Will Wolford
Raleigh McKenzie	LG		Jim Ritcher
Jeff Bostic	C		Kent Hull
Mark Schlereth	RG		Glenn Parker
Joe Jacoby	RT		Howard Ballard
Don Warren	TE		Keith McKeller
Art Monk‡	WR		Andre Reed‡
Mark Rypien	QB		Jim Kelly‡
Earnest Byner	RB		Thurman Thomas‡
Defense
Charles Mann	LE		Leon Seals
Eric Williams	LT	NT	Jeff Wright
Tim Johnson	RT	RE	Bruce Smith‡
Fred Stokes	RE	LOLB	Cornelius Bennett
Wilber Marshall	LLB	LILB	Shane Conlan
Kurt Gouveia	MLB	RILB	Carlton Bailey
Andre Collins	RLB	ROLB	Darryl Talley
Martin Mayhew	LCB		Kirby Jackson
Darrell Green‡	RCB		Nate Odomes
Danny Copeland	SS		Dwight Drane
Brad Edwards	FS		Mark Kelso

== Officials ==
- Referee: Jerry Markbreit #9 third Super Bowl (XVII, XXI)
- Umpire: Bob Boylston #101 second Super Bowl (XXI)
- Head linesman: Dale Williams #8 second Super Bowl (XX)
- Line judge: Ron Blum #83 second Super Bowl (XXIV)
- Back judge: Paul Baetz #22 second Super Bowl (XXIII)
- Side judge: Dick Creed #61 first Super Bowl
- Field judge: Ed Merrifield #76 first Super Bowl
- Replay official: Cal Lepore (head linesman for Super Bowl III)

Note: Back judge and field judge swapped titles prior to the 1998 season.
