= Kenneth Davis (American football) =

American football player (born 1962)

No. 36, 23
- Position: Running back

Personal information
- Born: April 16, 1962 (age 64); Temple, Texas, U.S.
- Listed height: 5 ft 10 in (1.78 m)
- Listed weight: 208 lb (94 kg)

Career information
- High school: Temple (TX)
- College: TCU
- NFL draft: 1986: 2nd round, 41st overall pick

Career history
- Green Bay Packers (1986–1988); Buffalo Bills (1989–1994)

Awards and highlights
- Unanimous All-American (1984); First-team All-SWC (1984)

Career NFL statistics
- Rushing yards: 3,513
- Rushing average: 4.3
- Receptions: 135
- Receiving yards: 878
- Total touchdowns: 32
- Stats at Pro Football Reference

Kenneth Earl Davis (born April 16, 1962) is an American former professional football player who was a running back in the National Football League (NFL). He played college football for the TCU Horned Frogs and was selected in the second round of the 1986 NFL draft. He played in the NFL for the Green Bay Packers (1986–1988) and the Buffalo Bills (1989–1994).

== College career ==
Before his NFL career, Davis played for Texas Christian University from 1982–1985. As a junior, he rushed for 1,611 yards (#3 in the NCAA) and 16 touchdowns, earning him a first-team selection on the College Football All-America Team. He also had the 5th most votes of all candidates for the Heisman Trophy that year. His 1,611 rushing yards were a school record, and remained so until LaDainian Tomlinson rushed for 1,850 yards in 1999.

He missed all but the first game of his senior season when he was suspended (along with six teammates) after confessing he received cash payments from boosters, but he finished his college career with an impressive 2,904 yards and 24 touchdowns. He left TCU second in school history in rushing yards and rushing touchdowns.

== Professional career ==
Considered a potential first-round draft pick in the 1986 NFL draft by Mel Kiper and Gil Brandt, Davis decided to join the NFL one year early after his suspension from TCU. However, he was denied as he had already played one game that year; under the "Red Grange Rule", players are not allowed to play college and NFL football in the same year. In an attempt to force the NFL to allow a special supplemental draft, Davis and agent Michael Trope prepared to sue the league for $13 million; Trope pointed to Florida State running back Roosevelt Snipes, who was kicked off the FSU roster before the 1985 season and was drafted by the San Francisco 49ers in the supplemental draft, as an exception to the rule.

NFL Commissioner Pete Rozelle rejected Davis again and the league filed a counter-suit to ensure the Grange Rule was legal. Davis accepted the ruling and tried to drop the case, but attorney Steven Knowles filed the suit anyway, unaware of Davis' decision. After the matter was cleared, Davis waited until 1986 to enter the league, and he was selected by the Packers in the second round of the 1986 NFL Draft.

As a rookie, he was the team's leading rusher with 519 yards, returned 12 kickoffs for 231 yards, and caught 21 passes for 142 yards. In 1987, he was their leading rusher again, although he only rushed for 413 yards. Davis played only 9 games with the Packers in 1988 due to injuries, and signed with the Bills after the season ended.

With the Bills, Davis proved to be a superb complement to star running back Thurman Thomas, and a great asset to the team overall. In 1990, he rushed for 302 yards on just 64 carries (a 4.7 yards per carry average), caught 9 passes for 78 yards, and scored 5 touchdowns, assisting his team to Super Bowl XXV, where they lost to the New York Giants. In the game, Davis rushed for 4 yards and caught 2 passes for 23 yards. The following season, he rushed for 624 yards, caught 20 passes for 118 yards, returned 4 kickoffs for 73 yards, and assisted Buffalo to their second consecutive Super Bowl appearance. They lost Super Bowl XXVI to the Washington Redskins 37–24, but Davis had a good performance, leading the team with 17 rushing yards and catching 4 passes for 38 yards. He would get the start in that game, because star running back Thurman Thomas could not find his helmet.

In 1992, Davis had the best season of his career. He rushed for 613 yards, caught 15 passes for 80 yards, returned 14 kickoffs for 251 yards, and scored a career-high 6 touchdowns. But he is best remembered for his superb performance in the post season. In Buffalo's wild card game against the Houston Oilers, Thomas was knocked out of the game early with a hip injury, and Houston built up a 28–3 first half lead. Then, they increased it to 35–3 early in the third quarter when backup quarterback Frank Reich's pass was intercepted and returned for a touchdown. But in what became known as The Comeback, Buffalo stormed back and won the game 41–38 in overtime; the rally from the 32-point deficit was the largest comeback in NFL history. Davis was instrumental in the Bills victory, rushing for 68 yards, catching 2 passes for 25 yards, and scoring the first touchdown of the game for Buffalo. One week later, the Bills traveled on the road to face the Pittsburgh Steelers in the Divisional Playoffs, with Thomas back but playing hurt, Davis did a superb job carrying the offense, rushing for 104 yards and a touchdown on just 10 carries in the Bills 24–3 win. Then the Bills advanced to their 3rd consecutive Super Bowl by defeating the Miami Dolphins 29–10 in the AFC title game. Thomas had recovered enough to regain his spot on the starting lineup, but Davis was still a major factor in Buffalo's victory. He rushed for 61 yards and a touchdown while also catching 4 passes for 52 yards. The Bills lost Super Bowl XXVII to the Dallas Cowboys 52–17, but Davis had a great game. He was the Bills leading rusher with 86 yards, while also catching 3 passes for 16 yards and returning a kickoff for 21 yards.

Davis was major contributor for Buffalo for the 1993 season as the team advanced to their 4th consecutive Super Bowl. He rushed for 391 yards, caught 21 passes for 95 yards, and gained 100 yards on kickoff returns. After his team lost Super Bowl XXVIII to the Dallas Cowboys 30–13, he spent one more season with Buffalo and then retired in 1995.

Davis finished his 9 NFL seasons with 823 carries for 3,513 rushing yards (4.3 yards per carry), 135 receptions for 878 yards, 42 kickoff returns for 707 yards, and 32 touchdowns (27 rushing and 5 receiving). He now is the Athletic Director and former head football coach at Bishop Dunne Catholic School in Dallas, Texas.

== NFL career statistics ==
Legend
| | Led the league |
| **Bold** | Career high |

=== Regular season ===
| Year | Team | Games | | Rushing | | | | | Receiving | | | | |
| Year | Team | GP | GS | Att | Yds | Avg | Lng | TD | Rec | Yds | Avg | Lng | TD |
|---|---|---|---|---|---|---|---|---|---|---|---|---|---|
| 1986 | GNB | **16** | 6 | 114 | 519 | 4.6 | 50 | 0 | **21** | **142** | 6.8 | 18 | 1 |
| 1987 | GNB | 10 | **8** | 109 | 413 | 3.8 | 39 | 3 | 14 | 110 | 7.9 | **35** | 0 |
| 1988 | GNB | 9 | 7 | 39 | 121 | 3.1 | 27 | 1 | 11 | 81 | 7.4 | 11 | 0 |
| 1989 | BUF | **16** | 0 | 29 | 149 | **5.1** | 21 | 1 | 6 | 92 | **15.3** | 29 | **2** |
| 1990 | BUF | **16** | 0 | 64 | 302 | 4.7 | 47 | 4 | 9 | 78 | 8.7 | 16 | 1 |
| 1991 | BUF | **16** | 1 | 129 | **624** | 4.8 | **78** | 4 | 20 | 118 | 5.9 | 14 | 1 |
| 1992 | BUF | **16** | 0 | **139** | 613 | 4.4 | 64 | **6** | 15 | 80 | 5.3 | 22 | 0 |
| 1993 | BUF | **16** | 0 | 109 | 391 | 3.6 | 19 | **6** | **21** | 95 | 4.5 | 28 | 0 |
| 1994 | BUF | **16** | 1 | 91 | 381 | 4.2 | 60 | 2 | 18 | 82 | 4.6 | 12 | 0 |
| | | 131 | 23 | 823 | 3,513 | 4.3 | 78 | 27 | 135 | 878 | 6.5 | 35 | 5 |

=== Playoffs ===
| Year | Team | Games | | Rushing | | | | | Receiving | | | | |
| Year | Team | GP | GS | Att | Yds | Avg | Lng | TD | Rec | Yds | Avg | Lng | TD |
|---|---|---|---|---|---|---|---|---|---|---|---|---|---|
| 1989 | BUF | 1 | 0 | 0 | 0 | 0.0 | 0 | 0 | 0 | 0 | 0.0 | 0 | 0 |
| 1990 | BUF | 3 | 0 | 12 | 25 | 2.1 | 6 | **3** | 3 | 26 | 8.7 | 19 | 0 |
| 1991 | BUF | 3 | **1** | 29 | 99 | 3.4 | 13 | 1 | 6 | 51 | 8.5 | 12 | 0 |
| 1992 | BUF | **4** | 0 | **57** | **319** | **5.6** | **41** | 2 | **9** | **93** | **10.3** | **30** | 0 |
| 1993 | BUF | 3 | 0 | 30 | 106 | 3.5 | 15 | 1 | 4 | 11 | 2.8 | 16 | 0 |
| | | 14 | 1 | 128 | 549 | 4.3 | 41 | 7 | 22 | 181 | 8.2 | 30 | 0 |
