= Carlton Bailey =

American football player (born 1964)

No. 54
- Position: Linebacker

Personal information
- Born: December 15, 1964 (age 61); Baltimore, Maryland, U.S.
- Listed height: 6 ft 3 in (1.91 m)
- Listed weight: 242 lb (110 kg)

Career information
- High school: Woodlawn (Baltimore)
- College: North Carolina
- NFL draft: 1988: 9th round, 235th overall pick

Career history
- Buffalo Bills (1988–1992); New York Giants (1993–1994); Carolina Panthers (1995–1997)

Awards and highlights
- First-team All-ACC (1987)

Career NFL statistics
- Tackles: 632
- Sacks: 10
- Forced fumbles: 6
- Stats at Pro Football Reference

Carlton Wilson Bailey (born December 15, 1964) is an American former professional American football player who was a linebacker in the National Football League (NFL) for the Buffalo Bills, New York Giants, and Carolina Panthers. He played college football at the University of North Carolina and was selected in the ninth round of the 1988 NFL draft.

Perhaps his most memorable play came in the third quarter of the AFC Championship Game on January 12, 1992, between the Bills and Denver Broncos. He intercepted a John Elway pass that had been deflected by teammate Jeff Wright and returned it 11 yards for the game's first touchdown. The Bills went on to win, 10–7, to reach Super Bowl XXVI. Bailey played in the first three of four straight Super Bowl appearances by the Bills.

== Personal life ==
Bailey's son, Justin Bailey, is a professional hockey player who is currently under contract to the National Hockey League's San Jose Sharks.
