= Jim Ritcher =

American football player (born 1958)

No. 51
- Position: Guard

Personal information
- Born: May 21, 1958 (age 68); Berea, Ohio, U.S.
- Listed height: 6 ft 3 in (1.91 m)
- Listed weight: 273 lb (124 kg)

Career information
- High school: Highland (Medina, Ohio)
- College: NC State (1976–1979)
- NFL draft: 1980: 1st round, 16th overall pick

Career history
- Buffalo Bills (1980–1993); Atlanta Falcons (1994–1995)

Awards and highlights
- Second-team All-Pro (1991); 2× Pro Bowl (1991, 1992); Buffalo Bills Wall of Fame; Buffalo Bills 50th Anniversary Team; Outland Trophy (1979); Unanimous All-American (1979); Consensus All-American (1978); 2× First-team All-ACC (1978, 1979); NC State Wolfpack No. 51 retired

Career NFL statistics
- Games played: 218
- Games started: 167
- Fumble recoveries: 3
- Stats at Pro Football Reference
- College Football Hall of Fame

James Alexander Ritcher (born May 21, 1958) is an American former professional football player who was a guard for 16 seasons in the National Football League (NFL). Ritcher played college football for the NC State Wolfpack, earning All-American honors. He was selected in the first round of the 1980 NFL draft, and played for the Buffalo Bills and the Atlanta Falcons of the NFL.

== Early life ==
Ritcher was born in Berea, Ohio. He attended Highland High School in Medina, Ohio, where he wrestled and played high school football.

== College career ==
He attended North Carolina State University, and played for the Wolfpack football teams from 1976 to 1979. Head coach Bo Rein decided to have him play center rather than defensive end that he had expected to play. As a senior in 1979, he was a consensus first-team was an All-American and won the Outland Trophy as the nation's best college interior lineman. He graduated with a degree in sociology. In 2012, he was among the first class of inductees into the Athletics Hall of Fame.

== Professional career ==
In the NFL, Ritcher was moved to guard from center by the Buffalo Bills after his first season to utilize his speed and agility. He would play for the team for 14 seasons. He started in all four Super Bowl appearances of the Bills (Super Bowl XXV, Super Bowl XXVI, Super Bowl XXVII, and Super Bowl XXVIII) and was selected to two Pro Bowls. He finished his career with the Atlanta Falcons. After sixteen seasons and a litany of injuries such as a broken foot and shoulder surgeries, Ritcher retired.

== Personal life ==
In 1998, he was selected to the College Football Hall of Fame, and in 2012 he was inducted as a member of the inaugural class of the NC State Athletic Hall of Fame He is currently working as a commercial pilot, flying for American Airlines.
