= David Pool =

American football player (born 1966)

No. 29, 27, 47, 2
- Position: Cornerback

Personal information
- Born: December 20, 1966 (age 59); Cincinnati, Ohio, U.S.
- Listed height: 5 ft 9 in (1.75 m)
- Listed weight: 188 lb (85 kg)

Career information
- High school: Academy of Physical Education (Cincinnati)
- College: Carson–Newman
- NFL draft: 1990: 6th round, 145th overall pick

Career history
- San Diego Chargers (1990)*; Buffalo Bills (1990); New England Patriots (1991–1992); Buffalo Bills (1993); Denver Broncos (1993); Minnesota Vikings (1994)*; Miami Dolphins (1994); Winnipeg Blue Bombers (1995–1996); Orlando Predators (1997)
- * Offseason or practice squad member only

Career NFL statistics
- Tackles: 86
- Interceptions: 3
- Fumble recoveries: 2
- Stats at Pro Football Reference

David Allen Pool (born December 20, 1966) is an American former professional football player who was a defensive back in the National Football League (NFL) for the Buffalo Bills, New England Patriots, and Miami Dolphins. He played college football for the Tennessee State Tigers and Carson–Newman Eagles. Pool was selected by the San Diego Chargers in the sixth round of the 1990 NFL draft.
