= Adam Lingner =

American football player (born 1960)

No. 51, 79, 62, 63
- Positions: Center, guard

Personal information
- Born: November 2, 1960 (age 66); Indianapolis, Indiana, U.S.
- Listed height: 6 ft 4 in (1.93 m)
- Listed weight: 268 lb (122 kg)

Career information
- High school: Alleman (Rock Island, Illinois)
- College: Illinois
- NFL draft: 1983: 9th round, 231st overall pick

Career history
- Kansas City Chiefs (1983–1986); New England Patriots (1986); Denver Broncos (1987)*; Buffalo Bills (1987); Kansas City Chiefs (1988); Buffalo Bills (1989–1995)
- * Offseason or practice squad member only

Career NFL statistics
- Games played: 200
- Games started: 1
- Fumble recoveries: 1
- Stats at Pro Football Reference

Adam James Lingner (born November 2, 1960) is an American former professional football player who was an offensive lineman for 13 seasons in the National Football League (NFL) with the Kansas City Chiefs and the Buffalo Bills. He played college football for the Illinois Fighting Illini. Lingner was selected by the Chiefs in the ninth round of the 1983 NFL draft, and was the lowest draft pick to make the team. He was a member of Buffalo's teams in four consecutive Super Bowl games: Super Bowl XXV, Super Bowl XXVI, Super Bowl XXVII and Super Bowl XXVIII.

Adam Lingner is most known for being the long-snapper on the "wide right" field goal by Scott Norwood in Super Bowl XXV. Lingner is also one of only 22 players to play in all of the Buffalo Bills Super Bowl appearances in the early 1990s.
