= Leonard Smith (American football) =

American football player (born 1960)

No. 45, 46
- Positions: Safety, cornerback

Personal information
- Born: September 2, 1960 (age 66); New Orleans, Louisiana, U.S.
- Listed height: 5 ft 11 in (1.80 m)
- Listed weight: 202 lb (92 kg)

Career information
- High school: Robert E. Lee (Baton Rouge, Louisiana)
- College: McNeese State
- NFL draft: 1983: 1st round, 17th overall pick

Career history
- St. Louis / Phoenix Cardinals (1983–1988); Buffalo Bills (1988-1991)

Awards and highlights
- Second-team All-Pro (1986)

Career NFL statistics
- Interceptions: 14
- Sacks: 14
- Touchdowns: 3
- Stats at Pro Football Reference
- College Football Hall of Fame

Leonard Phillip Smith (born September 2, 1960) is an American former professional football player who was drafted in the first round of the 1983 NFL Draft as a cornerback by the St. Louis/Phoenix Cardinals of the National Football League (NFL) and played professionally primarily at strong safety for the Cardinals and the Buffalo Bills. He played college football at McNeese State University. While at McNeese, Smith was an All-Southland Conference and All-Louisiana Selection at cornerback. On special teams, Smith was particularly effective at blocking fieldgoals, point after attempts and punts. He was elected to the College Football Hall of Fame in 2014. With the Buffalo Bills, he appeared in two Super Bowls (XXV, XXVI).
