= Keith McKeller =

American football player (born 1964)

No. 84
- Position: Tight end

Personal information
- Born: July 9, 1964 (age 62); Birmingham, Alabama, U.S.
- Listed height: 6 ft 6 in (1.98 m)
- Listed weight: 230 lb (104 kg)

Career information
- High school: Fairfield (Fairfield, Alabama)
- College: Jacksonville State
- NFL draft: 1987: 9th round, 227th overall pick

Career history
- Buffalo Bills (1987–1993)

Career NFL statistics
- Receptions: 124
- Receiving yards: 1,464
- Receiving touchdowns: 11
- Stats at Pro Football Reference

Terrell Keith McKeller (born July 9, 1964) is an American former professional football player who was a tight end for the Buffalo Bills of the National Football League (NFL) from 1987 to 1993.

Before his NFL career, McKeller attended Jacksonville State University on a basketball scholarship. He was the power forward on the 1984/85 NCAA Men's Division II Basketball Championship team and led the Gulf South Conference in rebounds for three of his four seasons. He finished his four seasons of college basketball with 1,495 points (4th in school history) and 1,209 rebounds (2nd). In 1986, he decided to join the school's football team as a walk-on. Despite not playing football since high school, McKeller immediately made the starting lineup and went on to catch 26 passes for 449 yards and three touchdowns.

Pre-draft measurables
Height	Weight	Arm length	Hand span	40-yard dash	10-yard split	20-yard split	20-yard shuttle	Vertical jump	Broad jump	Bench press
6 ft 4 1/4 in (1.94 m)	244 lb (111 kg)	31 in (0.79 m)	10 in (0.25 m)	4.84 s	1.72 s	2.77 s	4.63 s	31.0 in (0.79 m)	9 ft 3 in (2.82 m)	16 reps
All values from NFL Combine

In 1987, he was selected 227th overall by the Bills in the ninth round of the NFL draft.

McKeller's blocking and pass receiving was a big asset to the team during the early 1990s, assisting them to 4 Super Bowl appearances — Super Bowl XXV, Super Bowl XXVI, Super Bowl XXVII, and Super Bowl XXVIII. His best season was in 1990, when he caught 34 passes for 464 yards and 5 touchdowns.

The Bills K-Gun offense under Marv Levy was actually named after McKeller's nickname "Killer" (not Jim Kelly, contrary to popular belief), who made it possible with his ability to block and pass catch effectively on different plays during the no huddle.

McKeller played in the NFL for seven seasons and recorded 124 receptions for 1,464 yards and 11 touchdowns.

McKeller's son, Darius, was an offensive lineman at the University of South Alabama from 2009 to 2012.
