= Dwight Drane =

American football player (born 1962)

No. 33, 45
- Position: Safety

Personal information
- Born: May 6, 1962 (age 64); Miami, Florida, U.S.

Career information
- High school: Miami Central Senior (FL)
- College: Oklahoma

Career history
- 1984: Los Angeles Express (USFL)
- 1986-1991: Buffalo Bills (NFL)
- Stats at Pro Football Reference

Dwight Drane (born May 6, 1962) is a retired professional American football safety who played for the Buffalo Bills of the National Football League and the Los Angeles Express of the United States Football League (USFL).

He was selected by the Buffalo Bills in the 1984 NFL Supplemental Draft of USFL and CFL Players, and subsequently, after playing a season (1984) with the Los Angeles Express, was signed by the Bills in 1986, and proceeded to anchor the Bills' defensive backfield from 1986 to 1991.
