= Al Edwards (American football) =

American football player (born 1967)

No. 85
- Position: Wide receiver

Personal information
- Born: May 18, 1967 (age 59); New Orleans, Louisiana, U.S.
- Listed height: 5 ft 8 in (1.73 m)
- Listed weight: 171 lb (78 kg)

Career information
- High school: Bonnabel (Kenner, Louisiana)
- College: Northwestern State
- NFL draft: 1990: 11th round, 292nd overall pick

Career history
- Buffalo Bills (1990–1992)

Career NFL statistics
- Receptions: 26
- Receiving yards: 264
- Total touchdowns: 2
- Stats at Pro Football Reference

Al Edwards (born May 18, 1967) is an American former professional football player who was a wide receiver for the Buffalo Bills of the National Football League (NFL). He played college football for the Northwestern State Demons and was selected 292nd overall in the 11th round of the 1990 NFL Draft by the Bills.

Edwards was also an All-American sprinter for the Northwestern State Demons track and field team.
