= Will Wolford =

American football player (born 1964)

No. 73, 69, 67, 77
- Position: Offensive tackle

Personal information
- Born: May 18, 1964 (age 62); Louisville, Kentucky, U.S.
- Listed height: 6 ft 5 in (1.96 m)
- Listed weight: 294 lb (133 kg)

Career information
- High school: St. Xavier (Louisville)
- College: Vanderbilt
- NFL draft: 1986: 1st round, 20th overall pick

Career history
- Buffalo Bills (1986–1992); Indianapolis Colts (1993–1995); Pittsburgh Steelers (1996–1998)

Awards and highlights
- Second-team All-Pro (1992); 3× Pro Bowl (1990, 1992, 1995); PFWA All-Rookie Team (1986); Third-team All-American (1985); First-team All-SEC (1985)

Career NFL statistics
- Games played: 191
- Games started: 191
- Fumble recoveries: 3
- Stats at Pro Football Reference

William Charles Wolford (born May 18, 1964) is an American former professional football player who was an offensive lineman in the National Football League (NFL) for the Buffalo Bills, Indianapolis Colts, and Pittsburgh Steelers. He played college football for the Vanderbilt Commodores.

== Playing career ==
Wolford attended St. Xavier High School in Louisville, Kentucky, and played college football at Vanderbilt University, where he was a third-team All-America selection as a senior.

He was the Bills' first-round pick in the 1986 NFL draft, and played for them from 1986 to 1992, including AFC championships (and Super Bowl losses) in his last three years in Buffalo. Wolford signed as a free agent with the Colts in 1993, and finally joined the Steelers from 1996 to 1998. He was named to the AFC Pro Bowl roster in 1990, 1992, and 1995.

== Post-playing career ==
In 2002, he became the majority owner/operator of the Arena Football 2's Louisville Fire.

Wolford took over color analyst duties for the Colts in the 2007 season, working alongside longtime Colts voice Bob Lamey. Wolford was also co-host of The Bob and Will Show, working alongside Bob Valvano on WQKC, an all-sports station in Louisville, until that station changed formats in November 2008.

In 2013, Wolford became the head football coach at his alma mater of St. Xavier High, replacing the retiring Mike Glaser. On December 20, 2017, he announced his retirement.

== Personal life ==
Wolford's wife, Mary Jude Wolford, is a career lawyer who was elected November 8, 2022, to be the 15th Division District Court Judge in Kentucky. She had been a former assistant district attorney in Jefferson County. She and Wolford have been married since 1988. They have three adult daughters.

Wolford's nephew, John Wolford, is a quarterback for the Jacksonville Jaguars and played for the Arizona Hotshots in the Alliance of American Football.
