= Jeff Wright (defensive tackle) =

American football player (born 1963)

No. 91
- Position: Nose tackle

Personal information
- Born: June 13, 1963 (age 63); San Bernardino, California, U.S.
- Listed height: 6 ft 2 in (1.88 m)
- Listed weight: 274 lb (124 kg)

Career information
- High school: Lawrence (Lawrence, Kansas)
- College: Central Missouri State
- NFL draft: 1988: 8th round, 213th overall pick

Career history
- Buffalo Bills (1988–1994)

Career NFL statistics
- Tackles: 325
- Sacks: 31.5
- Forced fumbles: 6
- Stats at Pro Football Reference

Jeffrey Dee Wright (born June 13, 1963) is an American former professional football player who was a nose tackle for seven seasons with the Buffalo Bills of the National Football League (NFL). The Bills selected him 213th overall in the eighth round of the 1988 NFL draft. He became the Bills starting nose tackle in his third season. He played in four Super Bowls for the Bills, all losing efforts. Wright played college football first at Coffeyville Community College in Kansas, and then at Central Missouri State University, now known as the University of Central Missouri, where he played for the Mules.
