= 1991 New York Jets season =

1991 season of NFL team New York Jets

- Owner: Leon Hess
- General manager: Dick Steinberg
- Head coach: Bruce Coslet
- Defensive coordinator: Pete Carroll
- Home stadium: Giants Stadium

Results
- Record: 8–8
- Division place: 2nd AFC East
- Playoffs: Lost Wild Card Playoffs (at Oilers) 10–17
- Pro Bowlers: QB Ken O'Brien

The 1991 New York Jets season was the 32nd season for the team and the 22nd in the National Football League. It began with the team trying to improve upon its 6–10 record from 1990 under head coach Bruce Coslet.

The Jets finished the season with a record of 8–8, qualifying for the playoffs for the first time since 1986 as one of three AFC Wild Card teams. In the Wild Card Round they would lose to the Houston Oilers, 17–10. The Jets would not make the playoffs again until 1998.

For the second time in their history, the Jets suffered the embarrassment of losing at home to a team which would finish 1–15. The Colts defeated the Jets 28–27 at Giants Stadium in week 11, their lone win under interim coach Rick Venturi. In 1980, the Jets lost 21–20 to the Saints at Shea Stadium in week 15.

== Offseason ==
=== NFL draft ===
Round	Pick	Player	Position	School/Club team
2	34	Browning Nagle	Quarterback	Louisville
3	63	Mo Lewis	Linebacker	Georgia
4	94	Mark Gunn	Defensive tackle	Pittsburgh
6	148	Blaise Bryant	Running back	Iowa State
6	160	Mike Riley	Defensive back	Tulane
7	175	Doug Parrish	Defensive back	San Francisco State
8	202	Tim James	Defensive back	Colorado
9	234	Paul Glonek	Defensive tackle	Arizona
10	261	Al Baker	Running back	Kentucky
11	288	Rocen Keeton	Linebacker	UCLA
12	315	Mark Hayes	Offensive tackle	Arizona State

=== Undrafted free agents ===
1991 undrafted free agents of note
Player	Position	College
Pete Balistrieri	Wide receiver	Wisconsin–Eau Claire
Kip Beach	Tackle	Indiana State
Leroy Kinard	Running back	Liberty
Phil Logan	Wide receiver	Kentucky
Reggie Moore	Wide receiver	UCLA
Jim Scully	Linebacker	Hofstra
Matt Swinson	Tight end	Maine

== Personnel ==
1991 New York Jets staff
Front office: Chairman of the board – Leon Hess; President – Steve Gutman; Vice president/general manager – Dick Steinberg; Director of player personnel – Ron Wolf; Director of pro personnel – Jim Royer; Assistant director of pro personnel – Pat Kirwan; Head coaches: Head coach – Bruce Coslet; Offensive coaches: Quarterbacks – Joe Daniels; Running backs – Kippy Brown; Receivers – Chip Myers; Offensive line – Larry Beightol; Offensive assistant/tight ends – Bob Wylie	Defensive coaches: Defensive coordinator – Pete Carroll; Defensive line – Greg Robinson; Linebackers – Foge Fazio; Defensive assistant/defensive backs – Ed Donatell; Special teams coaches: Special teams coordinator – Al Roberts; Strength and conditioning: Strength and conditioning – Greg Mackrides; Asst strength and conditioning - Lee Brandon

== Roster ==
1991 New York Jets roster
Quarterbacks (QB): 8 Browning Nagle; 7 Ken O'Brien; 11 Troy Taylor; Running backs (RB): 30 Brad Baxter FB; 29 A. B. Brown; 34 Johnny Hector; 24 Freeman McNeil; 32 Blair Thomas; Wide receivers (WR): 87 Chris Burkett; 81 Terance Mathis; 85 Rob Moore; 88 Al Toon; Tight ends (TE): 80 Mark Boyer; 84 Chris Dressel; 82 Pat Kelly	Offensive linemen (OL): 66 Dave Cadigan G; 69 Jeff Criswell T; 62 Roger Duffy C; 75 Irv Eatman T; 79 Mike Haight G; 64 Trevor Matich C; 72 Brett Miller T; 53 Jim Sweeney C; 67 Dwayne White G; Defensive linemen (DL): 90 Dennis Byrd DT; 91 Paul Frase DT; 96 Mark Gunn DE; 56 Jeff Lageman DE; 94 Scott Mersereau DT; 71 Bill Pickel DT; 97 Marvin Washington DE	Linebackers (LB): 59 Kyle Clifton MLB; 55 Bobby Houston OLB; 95 Troy Johnson OLB; 58 Joe Kelly OLB; 57 Mo Lewis OLB; Defensive backs (DB): 43 Mike Brim CB; 40 James Hasty CB; 25 R. J. Kors SS; 22 Erik McMillan FS; 21 Don Odegard CB; 45 Tony Stargell CB; 48 Brian Washington SS; 31 Lonnie Young FS; Special teams (ST): 4 Louie Aguiar P; 2 Raúl Allegre K; 5 Pat Leahy K	Practice squad: 47 Corwin Anthony TE; 33 Blaise Bryant RB; 74 Mark Hayes T; 54 Pepper Jenkins LB; 35 Leroy Kinard RB; 17 Reggie Moore WR; Reserve: 89 Dale Dawkins WR (NF-Inj.); 44 Patrick Egu RB (IR); 51 Joe Mott LB (IR); 20 Dennis Price CB (PUP); 86 Ken Whisenhunt TE (IR); Rookies in italics 47 active, 5 reserve, 6 practice squad

== Preseason ==
=== Schedule ===
Week	Date	Opponent	Result	Record	Venue	Attendance
1	August 3	Philadelphia Eagles	L 10–24	0–1	Giants Stadium	31,577
2	August 10	vs. Kansas City Chiefs	L 10–19	0–2	Busch Stadium	52,935
3	August 17	at New York Giants	L 10–24	0–3	Giants Stadium	73,618
4	August 24	vs. Washington Redskins	W 13–9	1–3	Williams-Brice Stadium	69,117

== Regular season ==
=== Schedule ===
Week	Date	Opponent	Result	Record	Venue	Attendance
1	September 1	Tampa Bay Buccaneers	**W** 16–13	1–0	Giants Stadium	61,204
2	September 8	at Seattle Seahawks	**L** 13–20	1–1	Kingdome	56,770
3	September 15	**Buffalo Bills**	**L** 20–23	1–2	Giants Stadium	65,309
4	September 23	at Chicago Bears	**L** 13–19 (OT)	1–3	Soldier Field	65,255
5	September 29	**Miami Dolphins**	**W** 41–23	2–3	Giants Stadium	71,170
6	October 6	at Cleveland Browns	**W** 17–14	3–3	Cleveland Stadium	71,042
7	October 13	Houston Oilers	**L** 20–23	3–4	Giants Stadium	70,758
8	October 20	at **Indianapolis Colts**	**W** 17–6	4–4	Hoosier Dome	53,025
9	Bye					
10	November 3	Green Bay Packers	**W** 19–16 (OT)	5–4	Giants Stadium	67,435
11	November 10	**Indianapolis Colts**	**L** 27–28	5–5	Giants Stadium	44,792
12	November 17	at **New England Patriots**	**W** 28–21	6–5	Foxboro Stadium	30,743
13	November 24	San Diego Chargers	**W** 24–3	7–5	Giants Stadium	59,025
14	December 1	at **Buffalo Bills**	**L** 13–24	7–6	Rich Stadium	80,243
15	December 8	at Detroit Lions	**L** 20–34	7–7	Pontiac Silverdome	69,304
16	December 15	**New England Patriots**	**L** 3–6	7–8	Giants Stadium	55,689
17	December 22	at **Miami Dolphins**	**W** 23–20 (OT)	8–8	Joe Robbie Stadium	69,636
Note: Intra-division opponents are in **bold** text.

=== Standings ===
AFC East
	W	L	T	PCT	DIV	CONF	PF	PA	STK
^{(1)} Buffalo Bills	13	3	0	.813	7–1	10–2	458	318	L1
^{(6)} New York Jets	8	8	0	.500	4–4	6–6	314	293	W1
Miami Dolphins	8	8	0	.500	4–4	5–7	343	349	L2
New England Patriots	6	10	0	.375	4–4	5–9	211	305	L1
Indianapolis Colts	1	15	0	.063	1–7	1–11	143	381	L6

== Season Game Summaries ==
=== Week 1 (Sunday, September 1, 1991): vs. Tampa Bay Buccaneers ===
Week 1: Tampa Bay Buccaneers at New York Jets – Game summary

Quarter	1	2	3	4	Total
Buccaneers (0–1)	3	3	0	7	13
Jets (1–0)	7	3	0	6	16

at Giants Stadium • East Rutherford, New Jersey

- Date: September 1, 1991
- Game time: 1:03 p.m. EDT
- Game attendance: 61,204
- Referee: Larry Nemmers
- TV announcers (CBS): Dick Stockton (play-by-play) and Merlin Olsen (color commentator)

Team	Category	Player	Statistics
TB	Passing		
TB	Rushing		
TB	Receiving		
NYJ	Passing		
NYJ	Rushing		
NYJ	Receiving		

Scoring summary

Quarter	Time	Drive			Team	Scoring information	Score	
Quarter	Time	Plays	Yards	TOP	Team	Scoring information	TB	NYJ
"TOP" = time of possession. For other American football terms, see Glossary of American football.							13	16

- Point spread:
- Over/under:
- Time of game: 2 hours, 50 minutes

Buccaneers	Game statistics	Jets
	First downs	
	Rushes–yards	
	Passing yards	
	Passes	
	Sacked–yards	
	Net passing yards	
	Total yards	
	Return yards	
	Punts	
	Fumbles–lost	
	Penalties–yards	
	Time of possession	

== Postseason ==
Round	Date	Opponent	Result	Venue	Attendance	Recap
Wild Card	December 29	at Houston Oilers	L 10–17	Houston Astrodome	61,485	
