= 1992 New York Jets season =

1992 season of NFL team New York Jets

- Owner: Leon Hess
- Head coach: Bruce Coslet
- Defensive coordinator: Pete Carroll
- Home stadium: The Meadowlands

Results
- Record: 4–12
- Division place: 4th AFC East
- Playoffs: Did not qualify
- Pro Bowlers: None

The 1992 New York Jets season was the 33rd season for the team and the 23rd in the National Football League. The Jets were looking to improve on their 8–8 record under head coach Bruce Coslet in 1991 and make a second consecutive trip to the postseason.

== Background ==
The Jets' problems began in the offseason when veteran quarterback Ken O'Brien announced he was holding out of training camp to get a new contract. O'Brien’s holdout continued into the season and Coslet named second-year backup Browning Nagle as the team's starter. Nagle did not have an effective year, only winning three of his thirteen starts. He was eventually replaced by O'Brien late in the year, but was pressed back into action after the veteran suffered a season-ending injury. The Jets didn't win a game until Week 5 against the New England Patriots and only won three more times the rest of the year to finish with a 4–12 record. Two of those wins came against division rivals, the eventual AFC Champion Buffalo Bills and the AFC East winner and conference runner up Miami Dolphins.

In addition to O'Brien’s injury, the Jets saw three of their starters lost to catastrophic injuries. In Week 2 defensive end Jeff Lageman, who had been a defensive star for the Jets during their 1991 playoff push, went down with a season-ending injury. Then, in a Week 10 loss to the Denver Broncos, star receiver Al Toon suffered a concussion. It was his ninth in eight seasons as a professional, and on the morning following the game Toon announced his immediate retirement due to the accumulation of concussions during his career.

=== Dennis Byrd ===
Finally, in a Week 13 loss to the Kansas City Chiefs at home, another major injury befell the Jets. During a Chiefs offensive series, Byrd advanced on quarterback Dave Krieg and was attempting to sack him. As he was doing this, his teammate Scott Mersereau was approaching from the other side of the formation. Byrd reached Krieg first and was able to strip the ball from him, forcing a fumble. A second later, Byrd collided with Mersereau, whom he did not see approaching, hitting him in the chest with the crown of his helmet. The collision broke the C5 vertebrae in Byrd’s neck, leaving him paralyzed.

The Jets wore a decal on their helmets for the rest of the season with Byrd's #90 surrounding an ichthys. With Byrd's injury still fresh in their minds the Jets went to Buffalo for their Week 14 matchup with the Bills and defeated them for their fourth and last win of the season.

Byrd began undergoing an aggressive physical therapy regimen and would eventually regain the ability to walk. He returned to Giants Stadium as an honorary captain for the team’s home opener the following season. His jersey number was never issued again by the Jets, but was not officially retired until 2012.

After the season, Jets star running back Freeman McNeil announced his retirement. At the time of his retirement he was the all-time leading rusher in Jets history, but he has since been surpassed by Curtis Martin.

== Offseason ==
=== NFL draft ===
Round	Pick	Player	Position	School/Club team
1	15	Johnny Mitchell	Tight end	Nebraska
2	42	Kurt Barber	Linebacker	USC
3	68	Siupeli Malamala	Offensive tackle	Washington
4	96	Keo Coleman	Linebacker	Mississippi State
5	127	Cal Dixon	Center	Florida
6	154	Glenn Cadrez	Linebacker	Houston
6	166	Jeff Blake	Quarterback	East Carolina
8	219	Vincent Brownlee	Wide receiver	Ole Miss
10	266	Mario Johnson	Defensive tackle	Missouri
11	293	Eric Boles	Wide receiver	Central Washington

=== Undrafted free agents ===
1992 undrafted free agents of note
Player	Position	College
Richard Holt	Safety	Arizona
Claude Jones	Guard	Miami (FL)
Scott McAlister	Punter	North Carolina
Clarence Miller	Wide receiver	Illinois State
Patrick Nelson	Wide receiver	Liberty
Brad Sullivan	Guard	New Mexico
Wayne Wicka	Defensive tackle	Winona State
Matt Willig	Offensive tackle	USC

== Personnel ==
1992 New York Jets staff
Front office: Chairman of the board – Leon Hess; President – Steve Gutman; Vice president/general manager – Dick Steinberg; Director of player personnel – Dick Haley; Director of pro personnel – Jim Royer; Assistant director of pro personnel – Pat Kirwan; Head coaches: Head coach – Bruce Coslet; Offensive coaches: Quarterbacks – Walt Harris; Running backs – Kippy Brown; Receivers – Chip Myers; Offensive line – Larry Beightol; Offensive assistant/tight ends – Paul Alexander	Defensive coaches: Defensive coordinator – Pete Carroll; Defensive line – Greg Robinson; Linebackers – Foge Fazio; Defensive assistant/defensive backs – Ed Donatell; Special teams coaches: Special teams coordinator – Al Roberts; Strength and conditioning: Strength and conditioning – Greg Mackrides

== Roster ==
1992 New York Jets roster
Quarterbacks (QB): 9 Jeff Blake; 8 Browning Nagle; 1 Mike Norseth; Running backs (RB): 30 Brad Baxter FB; 29 A. B. Brown; 21 Sheldon Canley; 35 Scottie Graham; 34 Johnny Hector; Wide receivers (WR): 87 Chris Burkett; 82 Rob Carpenter; 89 Dale Dawkins; 81 Terance Mathis; 85 Rob Moore; Tight ends (TE): 80 Mark Boyer; 83 Johnny Mitchell; 86 Ken Whisenhunt	Offensive linemen (OL): 66 Dave Cadigan T; 52 Cal Dixon C; 62 Roger Duffy G; 70 Siupeli Malamala T; 72 Brett Miller T; 53 Jim Sweeney C; 67 Dwayne White G; 77 Matt Willig T; Defensive linemen (DL): 91 Paul Frase DT; 96 Mark Gunn DE; 78 Mario Johnson DT; 94 Scott Mersereau DT; 71 Bill Pickel DT; 97 Marvin Washington DE	Linebackers (LB): 98 Kurt Barber OLB; 50 Glenn Cadrez OLB; 59 Kyle Clifton MLB; 99 Keo Coleman OLB; 55 Bobby Houston OLB; 51 Donald Jones MLB; 57 Mo Lewis OLB; Defensive backs (DB): 43 Mike Brim CB; 40 James Hasty CB; 25 R. J. Kors FS; 22 Erik McMillan FS; 27 Kevin Porter SS; 20 Dennis Price CB; 23 Marcus Turner CB; 48 Brian Washington SS; Special teams (ST): 4 Louie Aguiar P; 10 Cary Blanchard K	Practice squad: 76 James Brown T; 37 Anthony Prior CB; Reserve: 18 Eric Boles WR (IR); 90 Dennis Byrd DE (IR); 28 Pat Chaffey RB (IR); 69 Jeff Criswell T (IR); 75 Irv Eatman T (IR); 58 Joe Kelly LB (IR); 56 Jeff Lageman DE (IR); 24 Freeman McNeil RB (IR); 7 Ken O'Brien QB (IR); 32 Blair Thomas RB (IR); ♦88 Al Toon WR (IR); 31 Lonnie Young S (IR); ♦retired Rookies in italics 47 active, 12 reserve, 2 practice squad

== Regular season ==
=== Schedule ===
Week	Date	Opponent	Result	Record	Venue	Attendance
1	September 6	at Atlanta Falcons	**L** 17–20	0–1	Georgia Dome	65,585
2	September 13	at Pittsburgh Steelers	**L** 10–27	0–2	Three Rivers Stadium	56,050
3	September 20	San Francisco 49ers	**L** 14–31	0–3	The Meadowlands	71,020
4	September 27	at Los Angeles Rams	**L** 10–18	0–4	Anaheim Stadium	42,005
5	October 4	**New England Patriots**	**W** 30–21	1–4	The Meadowlands	60,180
6	October 11	at **Indianapolis Colts**	**L** 3–6	1–5	Hoosier Dome	48,393
7	Bye					
8	October 26	**Buffalo Bills**	**L** 20–24	1–6	The Meadowlands	68,181
9	November 1	**Miami Dolphins**	**W** 26–14	2–6	The Meadowlands	69,313
10	October 8	at Denver Broncos	**L** 16–27	2–7	Mile High Stadium	74,678
11	October 15	Cincinnati Bengals	**W** 17–14	3–7	The Meadowlands	60,196
12	November 22	at **New England Patriots**	**L** 3–24	3–8	Foxboro Stadium	27,642
13	November 29	Kansas City Chiefs	**L** 7–23	3–9	The Meadowlands	57,375
14	December 6	at **Buffalo Bills**	**W** 24–17	4–9	Rich Stadium	75,876
15	December 13	**Indianapolis Colts**	**L** 6–10	4–10	The Meadowlands	33,684
16	December 20	at **Miami Dolphins**	**L** 17–19	4–11	Joe Robbie Stadium	68,275
17	December 26	New Orleans Saints	**L** 0–20	4–12	The Meadowlands	45,614
Note: Intra-divisional opponents are in **bold** text.

=== Standings ===
AFC East
	W	L	T	PCT	DIV	CONF	PF	PA	STK
^{(2)} Miami Dolphins	11	5	0	.688	5–3	9–3	340	281	W3
^{(4)} Buffalo Bills	11	5	0	.688	5–3	7–5	381	283	L1
Indianapolis Colts	9	7	0	.563	5–3	7–7	216	302	W5
New York Jets	4	12	0	.250	3–5	4–8	220	315	L3
New England Patriots	2	14	0	.125	2–6	2–10	205	363	L5
