= 1993 New York Jets season =

1993 season of NFL team New York Jets

- Owner: Leon Hess
- Head coach: Bruce Coslet
- Defensive coordinator: Pete Carroll
- Home stadium: The Meadowlands

Results
- Record: 8–8
- Division place: 3rd AFC East
- Playoffs: Did not qualify
- Pro Bowlers: QB Boomer Esiason

The 1993 New York Jets season was the 34th season for the team and the 24th in the National Football League. After the team had returned from its 1991 playoff season with a 4–12 1992 campaign, the Jets and coach Bruce Coslet looked to get back into the postseason.

The biggest acquisition for the Jets in the offseason was quarterback Boomer Esiason, whom New York acquired from the Cincinnati Bengals for a draft pick. The Jets also acquired running back Johnny Johnson from the Phoenix Cardinals, and he led the team in both rushing yards and pass receptions (821 yards rushing, 67 receptions). Brad Baxter led the Jets with seven rushing touchdowns and Rob Moore, a third-year receiver, caught passes for 843 yards. Second year tight end Johnny Mitchell caught six touchdown passes for a team high. On defense Jeff Lageman returned from his season-ending injury in 1992 to record 8.5 sacks to pace the defensive line, and defensive back Brian Washington added six interceptions.

After struggling early by only winning two of their first six games, the Jets began a winning streak by defeating their in-stadium rival New York Giants, 10–6 on Halloween. The streak reached five before the Indianapolis Colts snapped it with a 9–6 defeat of the Jets in Week 14. The Jets won again the next week by defeating the Washington Redskins by a 3–0 score, but lost their remaining three games to finish 8–8 and out of the playoffs. On January 7, 1994, five days after the season ended, Coslet was fired (after refusing to give up calling the offense) and assistant Pete Carroll was promoted to serve as head coach.

In Weeks 13, 14, and 15, the Jets played in games where the winning team did not reach 10 points. The Jets were 2–1 in those three games, with the other victory being a 6–0 win against the New England Patriots in Week 13. On the other hand, the Jets did not score more than ten points in five of their last six games, the only exception being a Week 16 loss to the Buffalo Bills, and only scored three total touchdowns in those games (two in the Week 16 loss and one in a Week 15 loss to the eventual Super Bowl champion Dallas Cowboys). For the third time in five seasons, the Jets were shut out in their season finale.

== Offseason ==
=== NFL draft ===
Round	Pick	Player	Position	School/Club Team
1	4	Marvin Jones	Linebacker	Florida State
2	36	Coleman Rudolph	Defensive End	Georgia Tech
4	88	David Ware	Offensive Tackle	Virginia
5	115	Fred Baxter	Tight End	Auburn
5	120	Adrian Murrell	Running Back	West Virginia
5	129	Kenny Shedd	Wide Receiver	Northern Iowa
6	144	Richie Anderson	Running Back	Penn State
7	171	Alec Millen	Offensive Tackle	Georgia
8	200	Craig Hentrich	Punter	Notre Dame

=== Undrafted free agents ===
1993 undrafted free agents of note
Player	Position	College
Marcus Perry	Tackle	Murray State
Greg Sherwin	Tackle	Central Michigan
Chris Spencer	Wide receiver	Iowa State
James Spencer	Defensive Tackle	Syracuse
Shawn Williams	Linebacker	Rutgers
Greg Willig	Quarterback	Rice

== Personnel ==
1993 New York Jets staff
Front office: Chairman of the board – Leon Hess; President – Steve Gutman; Vice president/general manager – Dick Steinberg; Assistant general manager – James Harris; Director of player personnel – Dick Haley; Director of pro personnel – Jim Royer; Assistant director of pro personnel – Pat Kirwan; Head coaches: Head coach – Bruce Coslet; Offensive coaches: Quarterbacks – Walt Harris; Running backs – Johnny Roland; Receivers – Chip Myers; Offensive line – Larry Beightol; Offensive assistant/tight ends – Paul Alexander	Defensive coaches: Defensive coordinator – Pete Carroll; Defensive line – Greg Robinson; Linebackers – Foge Fazio; Defensive assistant/defensive backs – Ed Donatell; Special teams coaches: Special teams coordinator – Al Roberts; Strength and conditioning: Strength and conditioning – Greg Mackrides

== Roster ==
1993 New York Jets roster
Quarterbacks (QB): 9 Jeff Blake; 7 Boomer Esiason; 8 Browning Nagle; Running backs (RB): 30 Brad Baxter FB; 39 Johnny Johnson; 29 Adrian Murrell KR; 32 Blair Thomas; Wide receivers (WR): 17 Stevie Anderson WR; 87 Chris Burkett; 82 Rob Carpenter; 89 Dale Dawkins; 81 Terance Mathis PR; 85 Rob Moore; 19 Kenny Shedd; Tight ends (TE): 84 Fred Baxter; 86 Johnny Mitchell; 83 Troy Sadowski; 80 James Thornton	Offensive linemen (OL): 76 James Brown T; 66 Dave Cadigan G; 69 Jeff Criswell T; 52 Cal Dixon C; 62 Roger Duffy G; 75 Siupeli Malamala T; 74 Everett McIver G; 53 Jim Sweeney C; 68 David Ware T; 67 Dwayne White G; 77 Matt Willig T; Defensive linemen (DL): 91 Paul Frase DT; 96 Mark Gunn DE; 56 Jeff Lageman DE; 94 Scott Mersereau DT; 71 Bill Pickel DT; 92 Coleman Rudolph DE; 97 Marvin Washington DE	Linebackers (LB): 98 Kurt Barber OLB; 50 Glenn Cadrez OLB; 59 Kyle Clifton MLB; 55 Bobby Houston OLB; 57 Mo Lewis OLB; Defensive backs (DB): 21 Victor Green SS; 40 James Hasty CB; 25 Cliff Hicks CB; 42 Ronnie Lott FS; 37 Anthony Prior CB; 22 Eric Thomas CB; 23 Marcus Turner CB/S; 48 Brian Washington SS; 31 Lonnie Young FS; Special teams (ST): 4 Louie Aguiar P; 10 Cary Blanchard K; 99 Steve DeOssie LS	Practice squad: 26 Damon Pieri S; Reserve: 33 Richie Anderson RB (IR); 28 Pat Chaffey RB (IR); 54 Marvin Jones LB (IR); 70 Leonard Marshall DT (IR); 27 Kevin Porter S (IR); Rookies in italics 53 active, 5 reserve, 1 practice squad

== Regular season ==
=== Schedule ===
Week	Date	Opponent	Result	Record	Venue	Attendance
1	September 5	Denver Broncos	**L** 20–26	0–1	Giants Stadium	68,130
2	September 12	at **Miami Dolphins**	**W** 24–14	1–1	Joe Robbie Stadium	70,314
3	Bye					
4	September 26	**New England Patriots**	**W** 45–7	2–1	Giants Stadium	64,836
5	October 3	Philadelphia Eagles	**L** 30–35	2–2	Giants Stadium	72,593
6	October 10	at Los Angeles Raiders	**L** 20–24	2–3	Los Angeles Memorial Coliseum	41,627
7	Bye					
8	October 24	**Buffalo Bills**	**L** 10–19	2–4	Giants Stadium	71,541
9	October 31	at New York Giants	**W** 10–6	3–4	Giants Stadium	71,659
10	November 7	**Miami Dolphins**	**W** 27–10	4–4	Giants Stadium	71,306
11	November 14	at **Indianapolis Colts**	**W** 31–17	5–4	RCA Dome	47,351
12	November 21	Cincinnati Bengals	**W** 17–12	6–4	Giants Stadium	64,264
13	November 28	at **New England Patriots**	**W** 6–0	7–4	Foxboro Stadium	42,810
14	December 5	**Indianapolis Colts**	**L** 6–9	7–5	Giants Stadium	45,799
15	December 11	at Washington Redskins	**W** 3–0	8–5	Robert F. Kennedy Memorial Stadium	47,970
16	December 18	Dallas Cowboys	**L** 7–28	8–6	Giants Stadium	73,233
17	December 26	at **Buffalo Bills**	**L** 14–16	8–7	Rich Stadium	70,817
18	January 2, 1994	at Houston Oilers	**L** 0–24	8–8	Houston Astrodome	61,040
Note: Intra-division opponents are in **bold** text.

=== Standings ===
AFC East
	W	L	T	PCT	PF	PA	STK
^{(1)} Buffalo Bills	12	4	0	.750	329	242	W4
Miami Dolphins	9	7	0	.563	349	351	L5
New York Jets	8	8	0	.500	270	247	L3
New England Patriots	5	11	0	.313	238	286	W4
Indianapolis Colts	4	12	0	.250	189	378	L4

=== Season summary ===
==== Week 12 vs Bengals ====
Week Twelve: Cincinnati Bengals (0–9) at New York Jets (5–4)

Quarter	1	2	3	4	Total
Bengals	3	0	0	9	**12**
**Jets**	0	14	0	3	**17**

at The Meadowlands, East Rutherford, New Jersey

- Date: November 21
- Game time: 1:00 p.m. EDT
- Game weather: 40 °F (4 °C)
- Game attendance: 64,264
- Box Score

Boomer Esiason's first matchup against his former team

Team	Category	Player	Statistics
Bengals	Passing	David Klingler	22/31, 196 Yds, TD, 2 INT
Bengals	Rushing	Harold Green	9 Rush, 32 Yds
Bengals	Receiving	Jeff Query	6 Rec, 44 Yds, TD
Jets	Passing	Boomer Esiason	17/26, 192 Yds
Jets	Rushing	Adrian Murrell	9 Rush, 52 Yds
Jets	Receiving	Johnny Johnson	6 Rec, 99 Yds
