= 1991 Indianapolis Colts season =

39th season in franchise history

- Owner: Robert Irsay
- General manager: Jim Irsay
- Head coach: Ron Meyer (fired on October 1, 0–5 record); Rick Venturi (interim, 1–10 record)
- Home stadium: Hoosier Dome

Results
- Record: 1–15
- Division place: 5th AFC East
- Playoffs: Did not qualify
- Pro Bowlers: None

The 1991 Indianapolis Colts season was the 39th season for the team in the National Football League (NFL) and eighth in Indianapolis. The team was looking to improve on the 7–9 record they had recorded in 1990. Instead, the Colts put together a campaign that ranked as one of the worst in NFL history.

The Colts only recorded one victory in sixteen games, becoming the fourth team since the extension of the NFL's regular season to sixteen games to suffer this ignominy. To date it is their worst full season record in the entire history of the franchise, and the second worst overall record in team history, beaten only by the 1982 Baltimore Colts squad, where the team failed to record a victory in the strike-shortened season and finished at 0–8–1.

The Colts’ poor performance cost sixth-year head coach Ron Meyer his job after the Colts’ fifth consecutive loss to open the season. Meyer had been with the Colts since Week 14 in 1986, when he replaced the fired Rod Dowhower after the Colts had lost their first thirteen games of the season. Defensive coordinator Rick Venturi was promoted to interim head coach; he would lead the team to its only win, a one-point victory over the New York Jets on the road. The 1991 Colts are one of three 1–15 teams to win their lone game by one point; the others are the 1980 New Orleans Saints and 2000 San Diego Chargers.

The Colts scored the fewest points up to that point (143) of any team in NFL history in a sixteen-game schedule, (Note: The league switched from a 14- to a 16-game schedule in 1978.) scoring in the single digits in 11 games. The Colts never scored more than 28 points in any game (doing so in their lone victory), scored less than ten points eleven times, were shut out twice, and failed to score one single touchdown in nine of their sixteen games, which remains the largest proportion of games without scoring a touchdown since the 1977 “Zero Gang” Tampa Bay Buccaneers did not score a touchdown in eight of fourteen games. Statistics site Football Outsiders said of the Colts 1991 season:

It’s the flipside of [Super Bowl champion] Washington; the Colts were the worst offense and defense in the league in the second half of close games, and the worst offense in the league in the first quarter.

Their futility was mentioned in a Thanksgiving edition of Bill Swerski's Superfans, a recurring Saturday Night Live sketch. The four characters, all Chicago Bears fans, commented on how some cities aren't as fortunate as Chicago to have a good football team, citing Indianapolis as an example. Coincidentally, six days before the skit aired, the Bears defeated the Colts 31–17 at Indianapolis.

== Offseason ==
=== NFL draft ===
Round	Pick	Player	Position	School/Club team
2	40	Shane Curry	Defensive end	Miami (FL)
3	69	Dave McCloughan	Defensive back	Colorado
4	96	Mark Vander Poel	Offensive tackle	Colorado
5	125	Kerry Cash	Tight end	Texas
6	152	Mel Agee	Defensive end	Illinois
7	181	James Bradley	Wide receiver	Michigan State
8	208	Tim Bruton	Tight end	Missouri
9	236	Howard Griffith	Running back	Illinois
10	263	Frank Giannetti	Nose tackle	Penn State
11	292	Jerry Crafts	Offensive tackle	Louisville
12	319	Rob Luedeke	Center	Penn State

== Personnel ==
=== Staff ===
1991 Indianapolis Colts staff
Front office: President/treasurer – Robert Irsay; Vice president/general manager – Jim Irsay; Assistant general manager – Bob Terpening; Director of player personnel – Jack Bushofsky; Head coaches: Head coach – Ron Meyer/Rick Venturi; Assistant head coach/offensive line – Bill Muir; Offensive coaches: Offensive coordinator/quarterbacks – Leon Burtnett; Running backs – Sylvester Croom; Receivers – Milt Jackson; Tight ends – Brad Seely	Defensive coaches: Defensive coordinator/linebackers – Rick Venturi; Defensive line – Steve Furness; Secondary – George Catavolos; Special teams coaches: Special teams – Brad Seely; Strength and conditioning: Strength and conditioning – Tom Zupancic

=== Roster ===
1991 Indianapolis Colts roster
Quarterbacks (QB): 11 Jeff George; 9 Mark Herrmann; 12 Rusty Hilger; Running backs (RB): 32 Ken Clark; 29 Eric Dickerson; 44 Tim Manoa FB; 34 Bruce Perkins; Wide receivers (WR): 80 Bill Brooks; 84 Jessie Hester; 85 Darvell Huffman; 86 Sammy Martin KR; 83 Clarence Verdin; Tight ends (TE): 81 Pat Beach LS; 88 Bob Mrosko	Offensive linemen (OL): 62 Brian Baldinger C/G; 63 Brian Blados G/T; 71 Kevin Call T; 66 Chris Conlin G; 69 Randy Dixon G; 75 Irv Pankey T; 64 Darin Shoulders T; 72 Mark Vander Poel G; Defensive linemen (DL): 90 Mel Agee; 76 Sam Clancy DE; 91 Shane Curry DE; 95 Travis Davis NT; 78 Jon Hand DE; 98 Tony Siragusa NT	Linebackers (LB): 51 Chip Banks OLB; 50 Duane Bickett OLB; 54 Jeff Herrod ILB; 59 Matt Jaworski ILB; 56 Brian Jones ILB; 96 Quintus McDonald LB; 97 Scott Radecic ILB; 92 Tony Walker OLB; Defensive backs (DB): 31 Michael Ball SS; 36 John Baylor SS; 38 Eugene Daniel CB; 37 Chris Goode CB; 26 Alan Grant CB; 25 Cornell Holloway CB; 42 Dave McCloughan CB; 39 Mike Prior FS; 27 Keith Taylor FS; Special teams (ST): 4 Dean Biasucci K; 3 Rohn Stark P	Practice squad: 18 Eddie Britton WR; 21 Brian Lattimore RB; 89 Reggie Thornton WR; Reserve: 20 Albert Bentley FB (IR); 48 Tim Bruton TE (IR); 88 Kerry Cash TE (IR); 53 Ray Donaldson C (IR); -- Mark Garalczyk DE (IR); 23 Anthony Johnson FB (IR); 73 Zefross Moss T/G (IR); 74 Bill Schultz G (IR); 99 Donnell Thompson DE (IR); 68 Pat Tomberlin G (IR); 10 Jack Trudeau QB (IR); 58 Matt Vanderbeek LB (IR); Rookies in italics 47 active, 12 reserve, 3 practice squad

== Preseason ==
Week	Date	Opponent	Result	Record	Venue	Attendance
1	August 2	at Denver Broncos	L 3–10	0–1	Mile High Stadium	75,375
2	August 10	Seattle Seahawks	L 7–17	0–2	Hoosier Dome	47,943
3	August 17	New Orleans Saints	W 34–28	1–2	Hoosier Dome	45,963
4	August 23	at Philadelphia Eagles	L 21–23	1–3	Veterans Stadium	52,687

== Regular season ==
The Colts were victorious only once in the regular season, finishing last in the AFC East, and their fifteen losses tied an NFL record that was initially set by the 1980 New Orleans Saints and tied by the 1989 Dallas Cowboys and 1990 New England Patriots in the previous two NFL seasons. The 1991 Colts had a much weaker schedule to play than either the 1990 Patriots or 1989 Cowboys, playing eleven games against teams with non-winning records, as against only five for the 1990 Patriots and four for the 1989 Cowboys. The Colts lost nine consecutive games to start the season before rallying to defeat the playoff-bound New York Jets by a single point in Week 11. The win against their division rivals came at Giants Stadium; the Colts went 0–8 in the Hoosier Dome. (Incidentally, the Jets would become the next team to finish 1–15, doing so five years later.)

Since the Colts finished with the worst record in the NFL, they won the right to draft Steve Emtman, a defensive lineman from Washington whose career was derailed by injuries. It would take them until 1995 to reach the playoffs again, and the Colts did not become consistently successful until Peyton Manning joined the team near the end of the 1990s.

=== Schedule ===
Week	Date	Opponent	Result	Record	Venue	Attendance
1	September 1	**New England Patriots**	**L** 7–16	0–1	Hoosier Dome	49,961
2	September 8	at **Miami Dolphins**	**L** 6–17	0–2	Joe Robbie Stadium	51,155
3	September 15	at Los Angeles Raiders	**L** 0–16	0–3	Los Angeles Memorial Coliseum	40,287
4	September 22	Detroit Lions	**L** 24–33	0–4	Hoosier Dome	53,396
5	September 29	at Seattle Seahawks	**L** 3–31	0–5	Kingdome	56,656
6	October 6	Pittsburgh Steelers	**L** 3–21	0–6	Hoosier Dome	55,383
7	October 13	at **Buffalo Bills**	**L** 6–42	0–7	Rich Stadium	79,015
8	October 20	**New York Jets**	**L** 6–17	0–8	Hoosier Dome	53,025
9	Bye					
10	November 3	**Miami Dolphins**	**L** 6–10	0–9	Hoosier Dome	55,899
11	November 10	at **New York Jets**	**W** 28–27	1–9	Giants Stadium	44,792
12	November 17	Chicago Bears	**L** 17–31	1–10	Hoosier Dome	60,519
13	November 24	at Green Bay Packers	**L** 10–14	1–11	Milwaukee County Stadium	42,132
14	December 1	Cleveland Browns	**L** 0–31	1–12	Hoosier Dome	57,539
15	December 8	at **New England Patriots**	**L** 17–23 (OT)	1–13	Foxboro Stadium	20,131
16	December 15	**Buffalo Bills**	**L** 7–35	1–14	Hoosier Dome	48,286
17	December 22	at Tampa Bay Buccaneers	**L** 3–17	1–15	Tampa Stadium	28,043
Note: Intra-division opponents are in **bold** text.

=== Game summaries ===
==== Week 1: vs. New England Patriots ====
Week One: New England Patriots (0–0) at Indianapolis Colts (0–0)

Quarter	1	2	3	4	Total
**Patriots**	7	3	3	3	**16**
Colts	7	0	0	0	**7**

at Hoosier Dome

- Date: Sunday, September 1, 1991
- Game time: 4:00 p.m., EST
- Game weather: Indoors (dome)
- Referee: Dale Hamer

Team	Category	Player	Statistics
NWE	Passing	Tommy Hodson	13/18, 136 yards, TD
NWE	Rushing	Leonard Russell	24 rushes, 72 yards
NWE	Receiving	Irving Fryar	4 receptions, 57 yards
IND	Passing	Jeff George	27/42, 301 yards, TD, 2 INT
IND	Rushing	Eric Dickerson	15 rushes, 64 yards
IND	Receiving	Bill Brooks	4 receptions, 89 yards, TD

Scoring summary

Quarter	Time	Drive			Team	Scoring information	Score	
Quarter	Time	Plays	Yards	TOP	Team	Scoring information	NWE	IND
1					Patriots	Marv Cook 23-yard touchdown reception from Tommy Hodson, Jason Staurovsky kick good	7	0
1					Colts	Bill Brooks 24-yard touchdown reception from Jeff George, Dean Biasucci kick good	7	7
2					Patriots	35-yard field goal by Jason Staurovsky	10	7
3					Patriots	39-yard field goal by Jason Staurovsky	13	7
4					Patriots	36-yard field goal by Jason Staurovsky	16	7
"TOP" = time of possession. For other American football terms, see Glossary of American football.							16	7

==== Week 2: at Miami Dolphins ====
Week Two: Indianapolis Colts (0–1) at Miami Dolphins (0–1)

Quarter	1	2	3	4	Total
Colts	0	3	0	3	**6**
**Dolphins**	3	0	7	7	**17**

at Joe Robbie Stadium

- Date: Sunday, September 8, 1991
- Game time: 1:00 p.m., EST
- Game weather: 82 °F (27.8 °C), relative humidity 77%, wind 9 miles per hour (14 km/h; 7.8 kn)

Team	Category	Player	Statistics
IND	Passing	Jeff George	17/31, 98 yards
IND	Rushing	Eric Dickerson	19 rushes, 60 yards
IND	Receiving	Albert Bentley	7 receptions, 42 yards
MIA	Passing	Dan Marino	14/25, 147 yards, TD, INT
MIA	Rushing	Mark Higgs	27 rushes, 111 yards
MIA	Receiving	Tony Paige	5 receptions, 53 yards

Scoring summary

Quarter	Time	Drive			Team	Scoring information	Score	
Quarter	Time	Plays	Yards	TOP	Team	Scoring information	IND	MIA
1					Dolphins	48-yard field goal by Charlie Baumann	0	3
2					Colts	48-yard field goal by Dean Biasucci	3	3
3					Dolphins	Aaron Craver 7-yard touchdown run, Charlie Baumann kick good	3	10
4					Colts	21-yard field goal by Dean Biasucci	6	10
4					Dolphins	Jim Jensen 9-yard touchdown reception from Dan Marino, Charlie Baumann kick good	6	17
"TOP" = time of possession. For other American football terms, see Glossary of American football.							6	17

==== Week 3: at Los Angeles Raiders ====
Week Three: Indianapolis Colts (0–2) at Los Angeles Raiders (1–1)

Quarter	1	2	3	4	Total
Colts	0	0	0	0	**0**
**Raiders**	0	13	3	0	**16**

at Los Angeles Memorial Coliseum

- Date: Sunday, September 15, 1991
- Game time: 1:00 p.m., EST
- Game weather: 66 °F (18.9 °C), relative humidity 77%, wind 9 miles per hour (14 km/h; 7.8 kn)

Team	Category	Player	Statistics
IND	Passing	Jeff George	21/32, 220 yards
IND	Rushing	Eric Dickerson	20 rushes, 77 yards
IND	Receiving	Anthony Johnson	10 receptions, 89 yards
RAI	Passing	Jay Schroeder	13/22, 181 yards, TD
RAI	Rushing	Roger Craig	19 rushes, 57 yards
RAI	Receiving	Mervyn Fernandez	7 receptions, 90 yards, TD

Scoring summary

Quarter	Time	Drive			Team	Scoring information	Score	
Quarter	Time	Plays	Yards	TOP	Team	Scoring information	TB	NYJ
2					Raiders	Mervyn Fernandez 16-yard touchdown reception from Jay Schroeder, Jeff Jaeger kick good	0	7
2					Raiders	33-yard field goal by Jeff Jaeger	0	10
2					Raiders	41-yard field goal by Jeff Jaeger	0	13
3					Raiders	33-yard field goal by Jeff Jaeger	0	16
"TOP" = time of possession. For other American football terms, see Glossary of American football.							0	16

==== Week 4: vs. Detroit Lions ====
Week Four: Detroit Lions (2–1) at Indianapolis Colts (0–3)

Quarter	1	2	3	4	Total
**Lions**	0	7	16	10	**33**
Colts	10	0	0	14	**24**

at Hoosier Dome

- Date: Sunday, September 22, 1991
- Game time: 1:00 p.m., EST
- Game weather: Indoors (dome)

Team	Category	Player	Statistics
DET	Passing	Rodney Peete	17/23, 167 yards, 2 INT
DET	Rushing	Barry Sanders	30 rushes, 179 yards, 2 TD
DET	Receiving	Brett Perriman	6 receptions, 63 yards
IND	Passing	Jeff George	29/40, 348 yards, 2 TD, INT
IND	Rushing	Eric Dickerson	13 rushes, 17 yards, TD
IND	Receiving	Anthony Johnson	9 receptions, 105 yards

Scoring summary

Quarter	Time	Drive			Team	Scoring information	Score	
Quarter	Time	Plays	Yards	TOP	Team	Scoring information	DET	IND
1					Colts	Eric Dickerson 2 yard rush-yard touchdown run, Dean Biasucci kick good	0	7
1					Colts	20-yard field goal by Dean Biasucci	0	10
2					Lions	Rodney Peete 7 yard rush-yard touchdown run, Eddie Murray kick good	7	10
3					Lions	Barry Sanders 2-yard touchdown run, Eddie Murray kick good	14	10
3					Lions	Eric Dickerson tackled in end zone for a safety by Jerry Ball	16	10
3					Lions	Willie Green 11-yard touchdown reception from Erik Kramer, Eddie Murray kick good	23	10
4					Lions	19-yard field goal by Eddie Murray	26	10
4					Colts	Eric Dickerson 2-yard touchdown reception from Jeff George, Dean Biasucci kick good	26	17
4					Lions	Barry Sanders 23-yard touchdown run, Eddie Murray kick good	33	17
4					Colts	Jessie Hester 12-yard touchdown reception from Jeff George, Dean Biasucci kick good	33	24
"TOP" = time of possession. For other American football terms, see Glossary of American football.							33	24

==== Week 5: at Seattle Seahawks ====
Week Five: Indianapolis Colts (0–4) at Seattle Seahawks (1–3)

Quarter	1	2	3	4	Total
Colts	0	3	0	0	**3**
**Seahawks**	7	10	7	7	**31**

at Kingdome

- Date: Sunday, September 29, 1991
- Game time: 4:00 p.m. EST
- Game weather: Indoors (dome)

Team	Category	Player	Statistics
IND	Passing	Jeff George	17/31, 144 yards, 2 INT
IND	Rushing	Eric Dickerson	13 rushes, 42 yards
IND	Receiving	Clarence Verdin	4 receptions, 44 yards
SEA	Passing	Jeff Kemp	7/10, 56 yards, TD
SEA	Rushing	John L. Williams	17 rushes, 80 yards, TD
SEA	Receiving	John L. Williams	5 receptions, 41 yards

Scoring summary

Quarter	Time	Drive			Team	Scoring information	Score	
Quarter	Time	Plays	Yards	TOP	Team	Scoring information	IND	SEA
1					Seahawks	John L. Williams 6-yard touchdown run, John Kasay kick good	0	7
2					Seahawks	41-yard field goal by John Kasay	0	10
2					Seahawks	Punt returned 59 yards for touchdown by Chris Warren, John Kasay kick good	0	17
2					Colts	54-yard field goal by Dean Biasucci	3	17
3					Seahawks	Tommy Kane 7-yard touchdown reception from Jeff Kemp, John Kasay kick good	3	24
4					Seahawks	Derrick Fenner 10-yard touchdown run, John Kasay kick good	3	31
"TOP" = time of possession. For other American football terms, see Glossary of American football.							3	31

==== Week 6: vs. Pittsburgh Steelers ====
Week Six: Pittsburgh Steelers (2–2) at Indianapolis Colts (0–5)

Quarter	1	2	3	4	Total
**Steelers**	0	0	7	14	**21**
Colts	0	3	0	0	**3**

at Hoosier Dome

- Date: Sunday, October 6, 1991
- Game time: 8:00 p.m., EST
- Game weather: Indoors (dome)

Team	Category	Player	Statistics
PIT	Passing	Bubby Brister	13/16, 181 yards, 2 TD, 2 INT
PIT	Rushing	Barry Foster	12 rushes, 49 yards
PIT	Receiving	Chris Calloway	3 receptions, 71 yards
IND	Passing	Jeff George	22/28, 191 yards
IND	Rushing	Eric Dickerson	13 rushes, 24 yards
IND	Receiving	Bill Brooks	6 receptions, 79 yards

Scoring summary

Quarter	Time	Drive			Team	Scoring information	Score	
Quarter	Time	Plays	Yards	TOP	Team	Scoring information	PIT	IND
2					Colts	19-yard field goal by Dean Biasucci	0	3
3					Steelers	Eric Green 21-yard touchdown reception from Bubby Brister, Gary Anderson kick good	7	3
4					Steelers	Barry Foster 24-yard touchdown reception from Bubby Brister, Gary Anderson kick good	14	3
4					Steelers	Merril Hoge 1-yard touchdown run, Gary Anderson kick good	21	3
"TOP" = time of possession. For other American football terms, see Glossary of American football.							21	3

==== Week 7: at Buffalo Bills ====
Week Seven: Indianapolis Colts (0–6) at Buffalo Bills (5–1)

Quarter	1	2	3	4	Total
Colts	0	6	0	0	**6**
**Bills**	14	14	7	7	**42**

at Rich Stadium

- Date: Sunday, October 13, 1991
- Game time: 1:00 p.m. EST
- Game weather: 44 °F (6.7 °C), relative humidity 78%, wind 10 miles per hour (16 km/h; 8.7 kn)

Team	Category	Player	Statistics
IND	Passing	Jeff George	22/33, 168 yards, INT
IND	Rushing	Ken Clark	19 rushes, 44 yards
IND	Receiving	Jessie Hester	5 receptions, 59 yards
BUF	Passing	Frank Reich	6/7, 76 yards, 2 TD, INT
BUF	Rushing	Thurman Thomas	20 rushes, 117 yards, 2 TD
BUF	Receiving	Keith McKeller	3 rushes, 34 yards, TD

Scoring summary

Quarter	Time	Drive			Team	Scoring information	Score	
Quarter	Time	Plays	Yards	TOP	Team	Scoring information	IND	BUF
1					Bills	Thurman Thomas 14-yard touchdown run, Scott Norwood kick good	0	7
1					Bills	Carwell Gardner 3-yard touchdown run, Scott Norwood kick good	0	14
2					Colts	26-yard field goal by Dean Biasucci	3	14
2					Colts	29-yard field goal by Dean Biasucci	6	14
2					Bills	Thurman Thomas 7-yard touchdown run, Scott Norwood kick good	6	21
2					Bills	Keith McKeller 5-yard touchdown reception from Frank Reich, Scott Norwood kick good	6	28
3					Bills	James Lofton 11-yard touchdown reception from Frank Reich, Scott Norwood kick good	6	35
4					Bills	Kenneth Davis 78-yard touchdown run, Scott Norwood kick good	6	42
"TOP" = time of possession. For other American football terms, see Glossary of American football.							6	42

==== Week 8: vs. New York Jets ====
Week Eight: New York Jets (3–4) at Indianapolis Colts (0–7)

Quarter	1	2	3	4	Total
**Jets**	7	7	3	0	**17**
Colts	0	6	0	0	**6**

at Hoosier Dome

- Date: Sunday, October 20, 1991
- Game time: 1:00 p.m. EST
- Game weather: Indoors (dome)

Team	Category	Player	Statistics
NYJ	Passing	Ken O'Brien	14/19, 205 yards, TD, INT
NYJ	Rushing	Brad Baxter	20 rushes, 59 yards, TD
NYJ	Receiving	Rob Moore	4 receptions, 96 yards, TD
IND	Passing	Jeff George	14/22, 107 yards
IND	Rushing	Anthony Johnson	10 rushes, 51 yards
IND	Receiving	Bill Brooks	4 receptions, 31 yards

Scoring summary

Quarter	Time	Drive			Team	Scoring information	Score	
Quarter	Time	Plays	Yards	TOP	Team	Scoring information	NYJ	IND
1					Jets	Rob Moore 47-yard touchdown reception from Ken O'Brien, Pat Leahy kick good	7	0
2					Colts	42-yard field goal by Dean Biasucci	7	3
2					Jets	Brad Baxter 1-yard touchdown run, Pat Leahy kick good	14	3
2					Colts	34-yard field goal by Dean Biasucci	14	6
3					Jets	19-yard field goal by Pat Leahy	17	6
"TOP" = time of possession. For other American football terms, see Glossary of American football.							17	6

==== Week 10: vs. Miami Dolphins ====
Week Ten: Miami Dolphins (3–5) at Indianapolis Colts (0–8)

Quarter	1	2	3	4	Total
**Dolphins**	10	0	0	0	**10**
Colts	0	3	3	0	**6**

at Hoosier Dome

- Date: Sunday, November 3, 1991
- Game time: 4:00 p.m. EST
- Game weather: Indoors (dome)

Team	Category	Player	Statistics
MIA	Passing	Dan Marino	21/37, 231 yards, TD
MIA	Rushing	Sammie Smith	14 rushes, 49 yards
MIA	Receiving	Mark Duper	3 receptions, 64 yards, TD
IND	Passing	Jeff George	18/34, 189 yards, INT
IND	Rushing	Eric Dickerson	17 rushes, 63 yards
IND	Receiving	Jessie Hester	7 receptions, 90 yards

Scoring summary

Quarter	Time	Drive			Team	Scoring information	Score	
Quarter	Time	Plays	Yards	TOP	Team	Scoring information	MIA	IND
1					Dolphins	Mark Duper 12-yard touchdown reception from Dan Marino, Pete Stoyanovich kick good	7	0
1					Dolphins	35-yard field goal by Pete Stoyanovich	10	0
2					Colts	47-yard field goal by Dean Biasucci	10	3
3					Colts	25-yard field goal by Dean Biasucci	10	6
"TOP" = time of possession. For other American football terms, see Glossary of American football.							10	6

==== Week 11: at New York Jets ====
Week Eleven: Indianapolis Colts (0–9) at New York Jets (5–4)

Quarter	1	2	3	4	Total
**Colts**	0	7	21	0	**28**
Jets	7	7	7	6	**27**

at Giants Stadium, East Rutherford, New Jersey

- Date: Sunday, November 10, 1991
- Game time: 1:00 p.m.
- Game weather: Rain, 40 °F (4.4 °C), wind 22 miles per hour (35 km/h; 19 kn), wind chill 31 °F or −0.6 °C

Game information

**First quarter**

- Jets — Brad Baxter 4 yard run (Pat Leahy kick). **Jets 7–0**

**Second quarter**

- Jets — Chris Burkett 15 yard pass from Ken O'Brien (Pat Leahy kick). **Jets 14–0**
- Colts — Jessie Hester 49 yard pass from Jeff George (Dean Biasucci kick). **Jets 14–7**

**Third quarter**

- Colts — Clarence Verdin 88 yard kickoff return (Dean Biasucci kick). **14–14**
- Jets — Brad Baxter 1 yard run (Pat Leahy kick). **Jets 21–14**
- Colts — Jessie Hester 7 yard pass from Jeff George (Dean Biasucci kick). **21–21**
- Colts — Bill Brooks 7 yard pass from Jeff George (Dean Biasucci kick). **Colts 28–21**

**Fourth quarter**

- Jets — Pat Leahy 22 yard field goal. **Colts 28–24**
- Jets — Pat Leahy 25 yard field goal. **Colts 28–27**

**Colts**

- Jeff George — 16/26, 296 yards, 3 TD, 2 INT
- Ken Clark — 20 rushes, 50 yards
- Jessie Hester — 5 receptions, 100 yards, 2 TD

**Jets**

- Ken O'Brien — 23/36, 329 yards, TD
- Blair Thomas — 11 rushes, 58 yards
- Al Toon — 6 receptions, 93 yards

==== Week 12: vs. Chicago Bears ====
Chicago Bears (8–2) at Indianapolis Colts (1–9)

Quarter	1	2	3	4	Total
**Bears**	7	3	14	7	**31**
Colts	7	3	0	7	**17**

at Hoosier Dome

- Date: Sunday, November 17, 1991
- Game time: 1:00 p.m. EST
- Game weather: Indoors (dome)

Team	Category	Player	Statistics
CHI	Passing	Jim Harbaugh	18/32, 287 yards, 2 TD, INT
CHI	Rushing	Brad Muster	15 receptions, 101 yards, TD
CHI	Receiving	Anthony Morgan	1 reception, 84 yards, TD
IND	Passing	Jeff George	16/33, 176 yards, 2 TD
IND	Rushing	Ken Clark	11 rushes, 67 yards
IND	Receiving	Bill Brooks	7 rushes, 106 yards, TD

Scoring summary

Quarter	Time	Drive			Team	Scoring information	Score	
Quarter	Time	Plays	Yards	TOP	Team	Scoring information	CHI	IND
1					Colts	Jessie Hester 4-yard touchdown reception from Jeff George, Dean Biasucci kick good	0	7
1					Bears	Jim Harbaugh 6-yard touchdown run, Kevin Butler kick good	7	7
2					Bears	21-yard field goal by Kevin Butler	10	7
2					Colts	56-yard field goal by Dean Biasucci	10	10
3					Bears	Brad Muster 13-yard touchdown reception from Jim Harbaugh, Kevin Butler kick good	17	10
3					Bears	Anthony Morgan 84-yard touchdown reception from Jim Harbaugh, Kevin Butler kick good	24	10
4					Colts	Bill Brooks 9-yard touchdown reception from Jeff George, Dean Biasucci kick good	24	17
4					Bears	Brad Muster 9-yard touchdown run, Kevin Butler kick good	31	17
"TOP" = time of possession. For other American football terms, see Glossary of American football.							31	17

==== Week 13: at Green Bay Packers ====
Week Thirteen: Indianapolis Colts (1–10) at Green Bay Packers (2–9)

Quarter	1	2	3	4	Total
Colts	0	3	0	7	**10**
**Packers**	7	0	7	0	**14**

at Milwaukee County Stadium

- Date: November 24, 1991
- Game time: 1:00 p.m. EST
- Game weather: 28 °F (−2.2 °C), relative humidity 80%, wind 18 miles per hour (29 km/h; 16 kn), wind chill 16 °F (−8.9 °C)

Team	Category	Player	Statistics
IND	Passing	Jeff George	21/40, 184 yards, TD, INT
IND	Rushing	Ken Clark	19 rushes, 51 yards
IND	Receiving	Bill Brooks	10 receptions, 70 yards, TD
GNB	Passing	Mike Tomczak	5/17, 50 yards
GNB	Rushing	Darrell Thompson	15 rushes, 63 yards
GNB	Receiving	Jackie Harris	1 reception, 19 yards

Scoring summary

Quarter	Time	Drive			Team	Scoring information	Score	
Quarter	Time	Plays	Yards	TOP	Team	Scoring information	IND	GNB
1					Packers	Vince Workman 1-yard touchdown run, Chris Jacke kick good	0	7
2					Colts	35-yard field goal by Dean Biasucci	3	7
3					Packers	Mike Tomczak 2-yard touchdown run, Chris Jacke kick good	3	14
4					Colts	Bill Brooks 6-yard touchdown reception from Jeff George, Dean Biasucci kick good	10	14
"TOP" = time of possession. For other American football terms, see Glossary of American football.							10	14

==== Week 14: vs. Cleveland Browns ====
Week Fourteen: Cleveland Browns (5–7) at Indianapolis Colts (1–11)

Quarter	1	2	3	4	Total
**Browns**	3	28	0	0	**31**
Colts	0	0	0	0	**0**

at Hoosier Dome

- Date: Sunday, December 1, 1991
- Game time: 1:00 p.m. EST
- Game weather: Indoors (dome)

Team	Category	Player	Statistics
CLE	Passing	Bernie Kosar	18/23, 189 yards, TD
CLE	Rushing	Kevin Mack	9 rushes, 69 yards, TD
CLE	Receiving	Leroy Hoard	6 receptions, 74 yards
IND	Passing	Jeff George	10/21 100 yards, 2 INT
IND	Rushing	Eric Dickerson	16 rushes, 117 yards
IND	Receiving	Jessie Hester	4 receptions, 66 yards

Scoring summary

Quarter	Time	Drive			Team	Scoring information	Score	
Quarter	Time	Plays	Yards	TOP	Team	Scoring information	CLE	IND
1					Browns	41-yard field goal by Matt Stover	3	0
2					Browns	Kevin Mack 3-yard touchdown reception from Bernie Kosar, Matt Stover kick good	10	0
2					Browns	Kevin Mack 51-yard touchdown run, Matt Stover kick good	17	0
2					Browns	Leroy Hoard 2-yard touchdown run, Matt Stover kick good	24	0
2					Browns	Interception returned 20 yards for touchdown by James Jones, Matt Stover kick good	31	0
"TOP" = time of possession. For other American football terms, see Glossary of American football.							31	0

==== Week 15: at New England Patriots ====
Week Fifteen: Indianapolis Colts (1–12) at New England Patriots (4–9)

Quarter	1	2	3	4	OT	Total
Colts	0	14	3	0	0	**17**
**Patriots**	3	0	0	14	6	**23**

at Foxboro Stadium

- Date: Sunday, December 8, 1991
- Game time: 1:00 p.m. EST
- Game weather: 44 °F (6.7 °C), relative humidity 66%, wind 14 miles per hour (23 km/h; 12 kn)

Team	Category	Player	Statistics
IND	Passing	Jeff George	15/24, 159 yards, TD
IND	Rushing	Eric Dickerson	30 rushes, 53 yards, TD
IND	Receiving	Bill Brooks	6 receptions, 85 yards
NWE	Passing	Hugh Millen	21/40, 330 yards, 2 TD, 2 INT
NWE	Rushing	Leonard Russell	20 rushes, 82 yards
NWE	Receiving	Greg McMurtry	8 receptions, 119 yards

Scoring summary

Quarter	Time	Drive			Team	Scoring information	Score	
Quarter	Time	Plays	Yards	TOP	Team	Scoring information	TB	NYJ
1					Patriots	24-yard field goal by Charlie Baumann	0	3
2					Colts	Jessie Hester 13-yard touchdown reception from Jeff George, Dean Biasucci kick good	7	3
2					Colts	Eric Dickerson 1-yard touchdown run, Dean Biasucci kick good	14	3
3					Colts	40-yard field goal by Dean Biasucci	17	3
4					Patriots	John Stephens 1-yard touchdown run, Charlie Baumann kick good	17	10
4					Patriots	Ben Coates 2-yard touchdown reception from Hugh Millen, Charlie Baumann kick good	17	17
OT					Patriots	Michael Timpson 45-yard touchdown reception from Hugh Millen, Charlie Baumann kick not attempted (end of game)	17	23
"TOP" = time of possession. For other American football terms, see Glossary of American football.							17	23

==== Week 16: vs. Buffalo Bills ====
Week 16: Buffalo Bills (12–2) at Indianapolis Colts (1–13)

Quarter	1	2	3	4	Total
Bills	21	7	0	7	**35**
Colts	0	0	0	7	**7**

at Hoosier Dome

- Date: Sunday, December 15, 1991
- Game time: 8:00 p.m., EST
- Game weather: Indoors (dome)
- Game attendance: 48,286
- Referee: Dale Hamer
- TV announcers (ESPN Sunday Night Football): Mike Patrick and Joe Theisman

Team	Category	Player	Statistics
BUF	Passing	Jim Kelly	9/11, 119 yards, 3 TD
BUF	Rushing	Kenneth Davis	22 rushes, 90 yards, TD
BUF	Receiving	Andre Reed	4 receptions, 65 yards, TD
IND	Passing	Mark Herrmann	11/19, 137 yards, 3 INT
IND	Rushing	Ken Clark	21 rushes, 74 yards
IND	Receiving	Jessie Hester	5 receptions, 77 yards

Scoring summary

Quarter	Time	Drive			Team	Scoring information	Score	
Quarter	Time	Plays	Yards	TOP	Team	Scoring information	BUF	IND
1					Bills	Kenneth Davis 1-yard touchdown run, Scott Norwood kick good	7	0
1					Bills	James Lofton 11-yard touchdown reception from Jim Kelly, Scott Norwood kick good	14	0
1					Bills	Kenneth Davis 14-yard touchdown reception from Jim Kelly, Scott Norwood kick good	21	0
2					Bills	Andre Reed 23-yard touchdown reception from Jim Kelly, Scott Norwood kick good	28	0
4					Colts	Tim Manoa 1-yard touchdown run, Dean Biasucci kick good	28	7
4					Bills	Pete Metzelaars 4-yard touchdown reception from Frank Reich, Scott Norwood kick good	35	7
"TOP" = time of possession. For other American football terms, see Glossary of American football.							35	7

Jim Kelly and Frank Reich managed just thirteen completions, but four of them were touchdowns as the Bills romped in 35–7. Jeff George was benched after completing just 83 yards and Mark Herrmann was even worse, throwing three interceptions. The win secured the #1 playoff seed for the Bills.

==== Week 17: at Tampa Bay Buccaneers ====
Week Seventeen: Indianapolis Colts (1–14) at Tampa Bay Buccaneers (2–13)

Quarter	1	2	3	4	Total
Colts	0	3	0	0	**3**
**Buccaneers**	0	7	7	3	**17**

at Tampa Stadium

- Date: Sunday, December 22, 1991
- Game time: 1:00 p.m. EST
- Game weather: 63 °F (17.2 °C), relative humidity 72%, wind 5 miles per hour (8.0 km/h; 4.3 kn)

Team	Category	Player	Statistics
IND	Passing	Jeff George	20/37, 203 yards
IND	Rushing	Tim Manoa	4 rushes, 30 yards
IND	Receiving	Bill Brooks	7 receptions, 76 yards
TB	Passing	Vinny Testaverde	15/31, 168 yards, TD, 3 INT
TB	Rushing	Reggie Cobb	24 rushes, 87 yards
TB	Receiving	Mark Carrier	3 receptions, 60 yards, TD

Scoring summary

Quarter	Time	Drive			Team	Scoring information	Score	
Quarter	Time	Plays	Yards	TOP	Team	Scoring information	IND	TB
2					Colts	39-yard field goal by Dean Biasucci	3	0
2					Buccaneers	Mark Carrier 29-yard touchdown reception from Vinny Testaverde, Steve Christie kick good	3	7
3					Buccaneers	Lawrence Dawsey 9-yard touchdown run, Steve Christie kick good	3	14
4					Buccaneers	28-yard field goal by Steve Christie	3	17
"TOP" = time of possession. For other American football terms, see Glossary of American football.							3	17

=== Standings ===
AFC East
	W	L	T	PCT	DIV	CONF	PF	PA	STK
^{(1)} Buffalo Bills	13	3	0	.813	7–1	10–2	458	318	L1
^{(6)} New York Jets	8	8	0	.500	4–4	6–6	314	293	W1
Miami Dolphins	8	8	0	.500	4–4	5–7	343	349	L2
New England Patriots	6	10	0	.375	4–4	5–9	211	305	L1
Indianapolis Colts	1	15	0	.063	1–7	1–11	143	381	L6

== See also ==
- History of the Indianapolis Colts
- List of Indianapolis Colts seasons
- Colts–Patriots rivalry
