= 1991 Buffalo Bills season =

32nd season in franchise history, second straight Super Bowl appearance and loss

- Owner: Ralph Wilson
- General manager: Bill Polian
- Head coach: Marv Levy
- Offensive coordinator: Ted Marchibroda
- Defensive coordinator: Walt Corey
- Home stadium: Rich Stadium

Results
- Record: 13–3
- Division place: 1st AFC East
- Playoffs: Won Divisional Playoffs (vs. Chiefs) 37–14; Won AFC Championship (vs. Broncos) 10–7; Lost Super Bowl XXVI (vs. Redskins) 24–37
- All-Pros: 4: QB Jim Kelly (1st team); RB Thurman Thomas (1st team); C Kent Hull (1st team); G Jim Ritcher (2nd team)
- Pro Bowlers: 8: QB Jim Kelly; RB Thurman Thomas; WR Andre Reed; WR James Lofton; G Jim Ritcher; OLB Cornelius Bennett; OLB Darryl Talley; ST Steve Tasker

The 1991 Buffalo Bills season was the 32nd season and 22nd in the National Football League (NFL). The Buffalo Bills entered the season as defending AFC champions, having lost Super Bowl XXV to the New York Giants. They finished the National Football League's 1991 season with a record of 13–3, the same record as their previous season, and finished first in the AFC East division. The Bills qualified for their second Super Bowl appearance but lost for the second straight time, falling to the Washington Redskins by a score 37–24.

== Season summary ==
The Bills No Huddle “K-Gun” offense, after having a breakout 1990 season, once again dominated the league by gaining an NFL leading 6,525 yards and scoring 458 points, a franchise record, and second only to Washington. The leaders of the offense, quarterback Jim Kelly and running back Thurman Thomas, both had the best seasons of their careers. Kelly completed 64.1 percent of his passes for 3,844 yards and a league-leading 33 touchdowns, with only 17 interceptions, to give him a 97.6 passer rating. Behind his fullback Carwell Gardner, Thomas rushed for 1,407 yards, caught 62 passes for 620 yards, and scored 12 touchdowns to earn him both the NFL Offensive Player of the Year Award and the NFL Most Valuable Player Award. Just like Washington, Buffalo had more than one threat in their backfield. Running back Kenneth Davis emerged as a big threat off the bench, rushing for 624 yards, catching 20 passes for 118 yards, and scoring 5 touchdowns.

The Bills also had several major weapons in their passing game. Wide receiver Andre Reed led the team with 81 receptions for 1,113 yards and 10 touchdowns, and also rushed 12 times for 136 yards. On the other side of the field, veteran wide receiver James Lofton recorded 57 receptions for 1,072 yards and 8 touchdowns to earn his 8th Pro Bowl appearance and finish the year just 55 yards short of the all-time receiving record held by Steve Largent (13,089 yards). Pro Bowl tight end Keith McKeller was also a big contributor with 44 receptions for 434 yards, while receiver Don Beebe had 32 catches, 414 yards, and 6 touchdowns. Once again, the Bills offensive line was led by center Kent Hull along with Pro Bowl guard Jim Ritcher.

== Offseason ==
=== Draft ===
Despite few impact players in the later rounds, the Bills’ first two picks had long careers in Buffalo. The first pick, safety Henry Jones, played for the next ten seasons in Buffalo, making the Pro Bowl in his second season. Defensive end Phil Hansen played his entire eleven-year career in Buffalo, joining the team's Wall of Fame in 2011.

1991 Buffalo Bills draft
Round	Pick	Player	Position	College	Notes
1	26	Henry Jones *	S	Illinois	
2	54	Phil Hansen	DE	North Dakota State	
3	82	Darryl Wren	DB	Pittsburg State (KS)	
4	138	Shawn Wilbourn	CB	Long Beach State	
5	166	Millard Hamilton	WR	Clark Atlanta	
6	194	Amir Rasul	RB	Florida A&M	
8	222	Brad Lamb	WR	Anderson (IN)	
9	249	Mark Maddox	LB	Northern Michigan	
10	277	Tony DeLorenzo	OG	New Mexico State	
11	305	Dean Kirkland	OG	Washington	
12	333	Steve Clark	TE	Texas	
Made roster † Pro Football Hall of Fame * Made at least one Pro Bowl during career

=== Undrafted free agents ===
1991 undrafted free agents of note
Player	Position	College
Tom Bill	Quarterback	Penn State
Craig Hendrickson	Offensive line	Minnesota
Matt Ruhland	Defensive line	Iowa

== Personnel ==
=== Staff/coaches ===
1991 Buffalo Bills staff
Front office: President – Ralph Wilson; Vice president of administration/general manager – Bill Polian; Assistant general manager/director of pro personnel – Bob Ferguson; Director of player personnel – John Butler; Assistant director/collegiate scouting – A. J. Smith; Head coaches: Vice president for football operations/head coach – Marv Levy; Administrative assistant to the head coach – Chuck Lester; Offensive coaches: Offensive coordinator – Ted Marchibroda; Running backs – Elijah Pitts; Receivers – Nick Nicolau; Offensive quality control/tight ends – Don Lawrence; Offensive line – Tom Bresnahan	Defensive coaches: Defensive coordinator/linebackers – Walt Corey; Defensive line – Chuck Dickerson; Defensive backs – Dick Roach; Defensive quality control – Chuck Lester; Special teams coaches: Special teams – Bruce DeHaven; Strength and conditioning: Strength and conditioning coordinator – Rusty Jones

=== Roster ===
1991 Buffalo Bills roster
Quarterbacks: 7 Gale Gilbert; 12 Jim Kelly; 14 Frank Reich; Running backs: 23 Kenneth Davis; 35 Carwell Gardner FB; 34 Thurman Thomas; Wide receivers: 86 Mike Alexander; 85 Al Edwards KR/PR; 80 James Lofton; 83 Andre Reed; 89 Steve Tasker; Tight ends: 84 Keith McKeller; 88 Pete Metzelaars; 87 Butch Rolle	Offensive linemen: 75 Howard Ballard T; 64 Mike Brennan G; 59 Mitch Frerotte G; 67 Kent Hull C; 63 Adam Lingner C/LS; 74 Glenn Parker T; 51 Jim Ritcher G; 79 Joe Staysniak G; 69 Will Wolford T; Defensive linemen: 90 Phil Hansen DE; 73 Mike Lodish NT; 94 Mark Pike DE; 96 Leon Seals DE; 78 Bruce Smith DE; 91 Jeff Wright NT	Linebackers: 54 Carlton Bailey ILB; 97 Cornelius Bennett OLB; 50 Ray Bentley ILB; 58 Shane Conlan ILB; 99 Hal Garner OLB; 53 Marvcus Patton ILB; 56 Darryl Talley OLB; Defensive backs: 27 Clifford Hicks CB/PR; 47 Kirby Jackson CB; 20 Henry Jones SS; 38 Mark Kelso FS; 37 Nate Odomes CB; 46 Leonard Smith SS; 21 Brian Taylor CB; 31 James Williams CB; Special teams: 5 Brad Daluiso K; 9 Chris Mohr P; 11 Scott Norwood K	Reserve lists: 92 Gary Baldinger DE (IR); 82 Don Beebe WR/KR (IR); 65 John Davis G (IR); 45 Dwight Drane S (IR); 35 Eddie Fuller RB/KR (IR); 68 Ken Hackemack T (IR); 26 Chris Hale CB (IR); 44 Brad Lamb WR (IR); 55 Mark Maddox LB (IR); 41 Jamie Mueller FB (IR); 28 Greg Paterra RB (IR); 39 Darryl Wren CB (IR); Practice squad: 29 Howard Griffith FB; 93 Odell Haggins NT; 60 Dean Kirkland G; 47 active, 12 inactive, 3 practice squad
*Note: rookies in italics

== Preseason ==
Week	Date	Opponent	Result	Record	Venue	Attendance
1	July 28	vs. Philadelphia Eagles	W 17–13	1–0	Wembley Stadium	50,474
2	August 5	at New York Giants	L 17–23	1–1	Giants Stadium	76,121
3	August 10	Detroit Lions	W 21–16	2–1	Rich Stadium	51,813
4	August 17	at Green Bay Packers	L 24–35	2–2	Camp Randall Stadium	51,077
5	August 24	at Chicago Bears	L 13–30	2–3	Soldier Field	57,435

== Regular season ==
=== Schedule ===
Pro Football Reference argues that the 1991 Bills gained the second-easiest schedule of any NFL team since 1971, with only the 1999 St. Louis Rams who played only one team with a winning record in the regular season getting an easier set of games. Football Outsiders also argues that the 1991 Bills had the second-easiest schedule between 1989 and 2013 after the 1999 Rams. The Bills played five games against opponents 4–12 or worse, and a quarter of their games were against teams finishing 3–13 or worse, (Note: The 2014 Houston Texans played five games against opponents finishing 3–13 or worse. However, as the 2014 AFC South played a strong AFC North that went 26–13–1 in non-division games, the overall win record of the 2014 Texans’ opponents in extraneous games was 91–100 vis-à-vis 79–97 for the 1991 Bills.) whilst their only opponents with winning records were the NFC Central Lions and Bears, and AFC West Chiefs and Raiders.

Week	Date	Opponent	Result	Record	Venue	Attendance
1	September 1	**Miami Dolphins**	**W** 35–31	1–0	Rich Stadium	80,252
2	September 8	**Pittsburgh Steelers**	**W** 52–34	2–0	Rich Stadium	79,545
3	September 15	at New York Jets	**W** 23–20	3–0	Giants Stadium	65,309
4	September 22	at Tampa Bay Buccaneers	**W** 17–10	4–0	Tampa Stadium	57,323
5	September 29	Chicago Bears	**W** 35–20	5–0	Rich Stadium	80,366
6	October 7	at Kansas City Chiefs	**L** 6–33	5–1	Arrowhead Stadium	76,120
7	October 13	**Indianapolis Colts**	**W** 42–6	6–1	Rich Stadium	79,015
8	October 21	Cincinnati Bengals	**W** 35–16	7–1	Rich Stadium	80,131
9	Bye					
10	November 3	**New England Patriots**	**W** 22–17	8–1	Rich Stadium	78,278
11	November 10	at Green Bay Packers	**W** 34–24	9–1	Milwaukee County Stadium	52,175
12	November 18	at **Miami Dolphins**	**W** 41–27	10–1	Joe Robbie Stadium	71,062
13	November 24	at **New England Patriots**	**L** 13–16	10–2	Foxboro Stadium	47,053
14	December 1	**New York Jets**	**W** 24–13	11–2	Rich Stadium	80,243
15	December 8	at Los Angeles Raiders	**W** 30–27 (OT)	12–2	Los Angeles Memorial Coliseum	85,081
16	December 15	at **Indianapolis Colts**	**W** 35–7	13–2	Hoosier Dome	48,286
17	December 22	Detroit Lions	**L** 14–17 (OT)	13–3	Rich Stadium	78,059
Note: Intra-division opponents are in **bold** text.

=== Game summaries ===
==== Week 1 ====
Miami Dolphins at Buffalo Bills

Team	1	2	3	4	Total
Dolphins	7	7	3	14	31
• **Bills**	0	7	14	14	35

- Date: September 1
- Location: Rich Stadium, Orchard Park, New York
- Game start: 4:15 p.m. EST
- Game attendance: 80,252
- Game weather: 59 °F (15 °C), wind 9 miles per hour (14 km/h; 7.8 kn)
- Referee: Johnny Grier
- TV announcers (NBC): Dick Enberg and Bill Walsh
- Source: Pro-Football-Reference.com

Scoring summary
1	Dolphins	Mark Clayton 49-yard pass from Dan Marino (Charlie Baumann kick)	Dolphins 7–0
2	Dolphins	Mark Higgs 3-yard run (Charlie Baumann kick)	Dolphins 14–0
2	Bills	Andre Reed 54-yard pass from Jim Kelly (Scott Norwood kick)	Dolphins 14–7
3	Dolphins	Charlie Baumann 21-yard field goal	Dolphins 17–7
3	Bills	Butch Rolle 3-yard pass from Frank Reich (Scott Norwood kick)	Dolphins 17–14
3	Bills	Thurman Thomas 50-yard pass from Jim Kelly (Scott Norwood kick)	Bills 21–17
4	Dolphins	Mark Clayton 5-yard pass from Dan Marino (Charlie Baumann kick)	Dolphins 24–21
4	Bills	Carwell Gardner 1-yard run (Scott Norwood kick)	Bills 28–24
4	Bills	Thurman Thomas 7-yard run (Scott Norwood kick)	Bills 35–24
4	Dolphins	Mark Duper 3-yard pass from Dan Marino (Charlie Baumann kick)	Bills 35–31

Despite three touchdowns Dan Marino could not hold off Jim Kelly as the Bills erased a 17–7 Dolphins lead to win 35–31. The two teams combined for 331 rushing yards.

==== Week 2 ====
Team	1	2	3	4	Total
Steelers	0	10	17	7	34
• Bills	10	14	7	21	52

- Date: September 8
- Location: Rich Stadium
- Game start: 1:00 p.m. EST
- Game attendance: 79,545
- Game weather: 73 °F (23 °C), wind 8 miles per hour (13 km/h; 7.0 kn)
- Referee: Tom Dooley
- TV announcers (NBC): Tom Hammond and Joe Namath

Scoring summary
Q1	8:42	BUF	Lofton 53 yard pass from Kelly (Norwood kick)	BUF 7–0
Q1	2:27	BUF	Norwood 50 yard field goal	BUF 10–0
Q2	14:53	PIT	Anderson 25 yard field goal	BUF 10–3
Q2	10:14	BUF	Beebe 34 yard pass from Kelly (Norwood kick)	BUF 17–3
Q2	6:57	BUF	Beebe 14 yard pass from Kelly (Norwood kick)	BUF 24–3
Q2	4:06	PIT	Foster 56 yard run (Anderson kick)	BUF 24–10
Q3	11:13	BUF	Reed 14 yard pass from Kelly (Norwood kick)	BUF 31–10
Q3	8:08	PIT	W. Williams 1 yard run (Anderson kick)	BUF 31–17
Q3	6:11	PIT	Hinkle 57 yard interception return (Anderson kick)	BUF 31–24
Q3	1:16	PIT	Anderson 27 yard field goal	BUF 31–27
Q4	13:09	BUF	Beebe 11 yard pass from Kelly (Norwood kick)	BUF 38–27
Q4	7:57	BUF	Beebe 4 yard pass from Kelly (Norwood kick)	BUF 45–27
Q4	7:12	BUF	Odomes 32 yard interception return (Norwood kick)	BUF 52–27
Q4	5:18	PIT	Hoge 1 yard run (Anderson kick)	BUF 52–34

Jim Kelly erupted for six touchdowns as the Bills crushed the Steelers 52–34. Kelly threw for 363 yards, overshadowing the 194 rushing yards the Bills produced.

==== Week 3 ====
Team	1	2	3	4	Total
• Bills	0	10	6	7	23
Jets	0	10	7	3	20

- Date: September 15
- Location: Giants Stadium
- Game start: 4:00 p.m. EST
- Game attendance: 65,309
- Game weather: 70 °F (21.1 °C); wind 10 miles per hour (16 km/h; 8.7 kn)
- Referee: Bob McElwee
- TV announcers (NBC): Tom Hammond and Joe Namath

The Bills faced stiffer competition in their first road game of the year. The Jets clawed to a 10–3 lead late in the second; a pass-interference penalty set up a seven-yard Andre Reed touchdown catch. The Jets led 20–16 lead in the fourth quarter until Thurman Thomas caught a 15-yard score. The Jets raced downfield in the final seconds but missed a 51-yard field goal attempt, falling 23–20 to the Bills.

==== Week 4 ====
Team	1	2	3	4	Total
• Bills	7	0	3	7	17
Buccaneers	0	0	7	3	10

- Date: September 22
- Location: Tampa Stadium
- Game start: 4:00 p.m. EST
- Game weather: 80 °F (26.7 °C); wind 10 miles per hour (16 km/h; 8.7 kn)
- Referee: Gordon McCarter
- TV announcers (NBC): Joel Meyers and Dan Hampton

Returning for the first time since Super Bowl XXV, Scott Norwood missed one field goal attempt wide right from 36 yards. The Bucs behind Chris Chandler tied the game in the fourth. In the final minutes an apparent Bills fumble was nullified, and Keith McKeller caught the winning 29-yard touchdown for the 17–10 final.

==== Week 5 ====
Chicago Bears (4-0) at Buffalo Bills (4-0)

Team	1	2	3	4	Total
Bears	0	6	0	14	20
• Bills	0	7	14	14	35

- Date: September 29
- Location: Rich Stadium - Orchard Park, New York
- Game start: 1:00 p.m. EST
- Game weather: 47 °F (8.3 °C); wind 11 miles per hour (18 km/h; 9.6 kn)
- Referee: Tom White
- TV announcers (CBS): Dick Stockton and Merlin Olsen

The Bills held off the Bears 35–20 after putting up 422 yards of offense to Chicago's 353. Jim Harbaugh was intercepted once.

==== Week 6 ====
Team	1	2	3	4	Total
Bills	0	6	0	0	6
• Chiefs	3	10	17	3	33

- Date: October 7
- Location: Arrowhead Stadium
- Game start: 9:00 p.m. EST
- Game weather: 52 °F (11 °C), wind 13 miles per hour (21 km/h; 11 kn)
- Referee: Gerald Austin
- TV announcers (ABC): Al Michaels, Frank Gifford, and Dan Dierdorf

Harvey Williams and Christian Okoye combined for 225 rushing yards in leading a 33–6 massacre of the Bills; by themselves the two Chiefs backs put up more offense than the entire Bills offensive unit (211 total yards). Steve DeBerg added 150 passing yards and a touchdown as Buffalo's win streak crashed to a halt.

==== Week 7 ====
Team	1	2	3	4	Total
Colts	0	6	0	0	6
• Bills	14	14	7	7	42

- Date: October 13
- Location: Rich Stadium Orchard Park, NY
- Game start: 1:00 p.m. EST
- Game weather: 44 °F (7 °C), wind 10 miles per hour (16 km/h; 8.7 kn)
- Referee: Johnny Grier
- TV announcers (NBC): Jim Donovan and Beasley Reece

The Bills rebounded by hammering the winless Colts 42–6. The Colts failed to exceed six points for the sixth time in the season so far; they put up just 240 yards of offense vs. 276 rushing yards and four scores by Thurman Thomas, Kenneth Davis, and Carwell Gardner.

==== Week 8 ====
Team	1	2	3	4	Total
Bengals	3	0	10	3	16
• Bills	0	14	14	7	35

- Date: October 21
- Location: Rich Stadium
- Game weather: 47 °F (8 °C), wind 9 miles per hour (14 km/h; 7.8 kn)
- Referee: Dick Hantak
- TV announcers (ABC): Al Michaels, Frank Gifford, and Dan Dierdorf

The Bills hosted winless Cincinnati in their second Monday Night appearance in three weeks. Jim Kelly overcame three interceptions to toss five touchdowns (tying a Monday Night Football record), winning 35–16.

==== Week 10 ====
Team	1	2	3	4	Total
Patriots	0	3	7	7	17
• Bills	3	3	7	9	22

- Date: November 3
- Location: Rich Stadium
- Game start: 1:00 p.m. EST
- Game weather: 33 °F (1 °C), wind 18 miles per hour (29 km/h; 16 kn)
- Referee: Larry Nemmers
- TV announcers (NBC): Joel Meyers and Dan Hampton

The Bills struggled to a 22–17 win as Jim Kelly was picked off twice and Leonard Russell rushed for 106 yards and two scores. Jason Staurovsky missed two first-half field goal attempts amid periodic heavy winds at Rich Stadium. The Patriots got the ball back in the final 50 seconds after Kelly's second pick, but Hugh Millen was himself intercepted at the Bills 20.

==== Week 11 ====
Team	1	2	3	4	Total
• Bills	0	14	10	10	34
Packers	7	3	7	7	24

- Date: November 10
- Location: Milwaukee County Stadium
- Game start: 1:00 p.m. EST
- Game weather: 32 °F (0 °C), wind 9 miles per hour (14 km/h; 7.8 kn)
- Referee: Pat Haggerty
- TV announcers (NBC): Marv Albert and Paul Maguire

The Pack made a game of it as Mike Tomczak tossed for 317 yards and two touchdowns but was intercepted twice. Sterling Sharpe caught a 58-yard touchdown but was also blown up for a 15–yard loss on a rushing attempt.

==== Week 12 ====
Team	1	2	3	4	Total
• Bills	10	10	14	7	41
Dolphins	3	10	7	7	27

- Date: November 18
- Location: Joe Robbie Stadium
- Game start: 9:00 p.m. EST
- Game attendance: 71,062
- Game weather: 75 °F (24 °C), wind 10 miles per hour (16 km/h; 8.7 kn)
- Referee: Howard Roe
- TV announcers (ABC): Al Michaels, Frank Gifford, and Dan Dierdorf

The Dolphins fumbled three times and Dan Marino was intercepted twice as the Bills rolled to 262 rushing yards and three Jim Kelly touchdowns, winning 41–27.

==== Week 13 ====
Team	1	2	3	4	Total
Bills	3	7	3	0	13
• Patriots	0	9	0	7	16

- Date: November 24
- Location: Foxboro Stadium
- Game start: 1:00 p.m. EST
- Game weather: 47 °F (8 °C), wind 9 miles per hour (14 km/h; 7.8 kn)
- Referee: Gordon McCarter
- TV announcers (NBC): Jim Donovan and Beasley Reece

The Patriots pulled off one of the bigger upsets of the 1991 season as they picked off Jim Kelly four times while Hugh Millen threw a 50-yard score to Irving Fryar and ran in the winning score in a 16–13 win.

==== Week 14 ====
Team	1	2	3	4	Total
Jets	7	3	3	0	13
• Bills	7	3	7	7	24

- Date: December 1
- Location: Rich Stadium
- Game start: 1:00 p.m. EST
- Game weather: 40 °F (4 °C), wind 14 miles per hour (23 km/h; 12 kn)
- Referee: Stan Kemp
- TV announcers (NBC): Marv Albert and Paul Maguire

Jim Kelly and Ken O'Brien were both picked off twice as the Bills clawed to a 24–13 win, overcoming four turnovers and eleven penalties (76 yards).

==== Week 15 ====
Team	1	2	3	4	OT	Total
• Bills	7	7	0	13	3	30
Raiders	10	10	7	0	0	27

- Date: December 8
- Location: Los Angeles Memorial Coliseum
- Game start: 4:00 p.m. EST
- Game weather: 55 °F (13 °C), wind 9 miles per hour (14 km/h; 7.8 kn)
- Referee: Dick Hantak
- TV announcers (NBC): Don Criqui and Bob Trumpy

Amid a burgeoning feud with team owner Al Davis, Marcus Allen put up 95 all-purpose yards on 19 combined touches (16 of them rushes) and a touchdown as the Raiders led 27–14 after three quarters. Scott Norwood had a nightmarish day as he missed a PAT and three FGs but the Bills rallied to tie the game and in overtime Norwood connected on the winning 42-yarder, and a 30–27 Bills win.

==== Week 16 ====
Team	1	2	3	4	Total
• Bills	21	7	0	7	35
Colts	0	0	0	7	7

- Date: December 15
- Location: Hoosier Dome
- Game start: 8:00 p.m. EST
- Game attendance: 48,286
- Game weather: Indoors (dome)
- Referee: Dale Hamer
- TV announcers (ESPN): Mike Patrick and Joe Theismann

Jim Kelly and Frank Reich managed just thirteen completions, but four of them were touchdowns as the Bills romped 35–7. Jeff George was benched after completing just 83 yards and Mark Herrmann was even worse, throwing three interceptions. The win secured the #1 playoff seed for the Bills.

==== Week 17 ====
Team	1	2	3	4	OT	Total
• Lions	0	0	0	14	3	17
Bills	0	7	0	7	0	14

- Date: December 22
- Location: Rich Stadium
- Game start: 1:00 p.m. EST
- Game weather: 35 °F (2 °C), wind 22 miles per hour (35 km/h; 19 kn)
- Referee: Tom White
- TV announcers (CBS): James Brown and Randy Cross

With the #1 AFC seed confirmed, the Bills started Frank Reich against the Lions, still fighting for a playoff bye with the Bears to play the 49ers on Monday Night. Barry Sanders rushed for 108 yards and a touchdown, and his burgeoning legend as impossible to bring down showed when Cornelius Bennett appeared to bring him down for a ten-yard loss in the first quarter but Sanders escaped for a one-yard gain. Reich's touchdown to Steve Tasker forced overtime but the Lions won on a 21-yard field goal, 17–14 the final; with San Francisco's 52–14 massacre of the Bears, the Lions secured a playoff bye.

=== Standings ===
AFC East
	W	L	T	PCT	DIV	CONF	PF	PA	STK
^{(1)} Buffalo Bills	13	3	0	.813	7–1	10–2	458	318	L1
^{(6)} New York Jets	8	8	0	.500	4–4	6–6	314	293	W1
Miami Dolphins	8	8	0	.500	4–4	5–7	343	349	L2
New England Patriots	6	10	0	.375	4–4	5–9	211	305	L1
Indianapolis Colts	1	15	0	.063	1–7	1–11	143	381	L6

== Playoffs ==
=== AFC Divisional Playoffs: vs. Kansas City Chiefs ===
AFC Divisional Playoffs: Kansas City Chiefs at Buffalo Bills – Game summary

Quarter	1	2	3	4	Total
Chiefs	0	0	7	7	14
Bills	7	10	7	13	37

at Rich Stadium, Orchard Park, New York

- Date: January 5, 1991
- Game time: 12:30 p.m. EST
- Game weather: Rain, 37 °F (3 °C)
- Game attendance: 80,182
- Referee: Pat Haggerty
- TV announcers (NBC): Dick Enberg and Bill Walsh
- Box score

Game information

First quarter

- BUF – Andre Reed 25-yard pass from Jim Kelly (Scott Norwood kick). Bills 7–0.

Second quarter

- BUF – Andre Reed 53-yard pass from Jim Kelly (Scott Norwood kick). Bills 14–0.
- BUF – Scott Norwood 33-yard field goal. Bills 17–0.

Third quarter

- BUF – James Lofton 10-yard pass from Jim Kelly (Scott Norwood kick). Bills 24–0.
- KC – Barry Word 3-yard run (Nick Lowery kick). Bills 24–7.

Fourth quarter

- BUF – Scott Norwood 20-yard field goal. Bills 27–7.
- BUF – Scott Norwood 47-yard field goal. Bills 30–7.
- BUF – Kenneth Davis 5-yard run (Scott Norwood kick). Bills 37–7.
- KC – Fred Jones 20-yard pass from Mark Vlasic (Nick Lowery kick). Bills 37–14.

Top passers

- KC – Mark Vlasic – 9/20, 124 yards, TD, INT
- BUF – Jim Kelly – 23/35, 273 yards, 3 TD, 3 INT

Top rushers

- KC – Barry Word – 15 rushes, 50 yards, TD
- BUF – Thurman Thomas – 22 rushes, 100 yards

Top receivers

- KC – Todd McNair – 5 receptions, 52 yards
- BUF – Andre Reed – 4 receptions, 100 yards, 2 TD

=== AFC Championship: vs. Denver Broncos ===
AFC Championship: Denver Broncos at Buffalo Bills – Game summary

Quarter	1	2	3	4	Total
Broncos	0	0	0	7	7
Bills	0	0	7	3	10

at Rich Stadium, Orchard Park, New York

- Date: January 12
- Game time: 12:30 p.m. EST
- Game weather: Clear, 34 °F (1 °C)
- Game attendance: 80,272
- Referee: Dale Hamer
- TV announcers (NBC): Dick Enberg and Bill Walsh
- Box score

Game information

First quarter

- No scoring plays

Second quarter

- No scoring plays

Third quarter

- BUF – Carlton Bailey 11-yard interception return (Scott Norwood kick). Bills 7–0.

Fourth quarter

- BUF – Scott Norwood 44-yard field goal. Bills 10–0.
- DEN – Gary Kubiak 3-yard run (David Treadwell kick). Bills 10–7.

Top passers

- DEN – Gary Kubiak – 11/12, 136 yards
- BUF – Jim Kelly – 13/25, 117 yards, 2 INT

Top rushers

- DEN – Gaston Green – 19 rushes, 53 yards
- BUF – Thurman Thomas – 26 rushes, 72 yards

Top receivers

- DEN – Vance Johnson – 7 receptions, 100 yards
- BUF – Keith McKeller – 3 receptions, 39 yards

=== Super Bowl XXVI: vs. Washington Redskins ===
Super Bowl XXVI: Washington Redskins vs. Buffalo Bills – Game summary

Quarter	1	2	3	4	Total
Redskins	0	17	14	6	37
Bills	0	0	10	14	24

at Hubert H. Humphrey Metrodome, Minneapolis, Minnesota

- Date: January 26
- Game time: 6:30 p.m. EST / 5:30 p.m. CST
- Game weather: None (played indoors)
- Game attendance: 63,180
- Referee: Jerry Markbreit
- TV announcers (CBS): Pat Summerall and John Madden
- Box score

Game information

First quarter

- No scoring plays

Second quarter

- WAS – Chip Lohmiller 34-yard field goal. Redskins 3–0.
- WAS – Ernest Byner 10-yard pass from Mark Rypien (Chip Lohmiller kick). Redskins 10–0.
- WAS – Gerald Riggs 1-yard run (Chip Lohmiller kick). Redskins 17–0.

Third quarter

- WAS – Gerald Riggs 2-yard run (Chip Lohmiller kick). Redskins 24–0.
- BUF – Scott Norwood 21-yard field goal. Redskins 24–3.
- BUF – Thurman Thomas 1-yard run (Scott Norwood kick). Redskins 24–10.
- WAS – Gary Clark 30-yard pass from Mark Rypien (Chip Lohmiller kick). Redskins 31–10.

Fourth quarter

- WAS – Chip Lohmiller 25-yard field goal. Redskins 34–10.
- WAS – Chip Lohmiller 39-yard field goal. Redskins 37–10.
- BUF – Pete Metzelaars 2-yard pass from Jim Kelly (Scott Norwood kick). Redskins 37–17.
- BUF – Don Beebe 4-yard pass from Jim Kelly (Scott Norwood kick). Redskins 37–24.

Top passers

- WAS – Mark Rypien – 18/33, 292 yards, 2 TD, INT
- BUF – Jim Kelly – 28/58, 275 yards, 2 TD, 4 INT

Top rushers

- WAS – Ricky Ervins – 13 rushes, 72 yards
- BUF – Kenneth Davis – 4 rushes, 17 yards

Top receivers

- WAS – Gary Clark – 7 receptions, 114 yards, TD
- BUF – James Lofton – 7 receptions, 92 yards

The Bills became the eighth team to go scoreless in the first half, (Note: The others were the Baltimore Colts in Super Bowl III; the Minnesota Vikings in Super Bowls IV, VIII, IX, and XI; the Redskins in Super Bowl VII; and the Denver Broncos in Super Bowl XII) while the Redskins scored 17 points in the second quarter.

The Redskins then increased their lead 24–0 just 16 seconds into the second half after linebacker Kurt Gouveia intercepted Kelly's pass on the first play of the third quarter and returned it 23 yards to the Bills’ 2-yard line. One play later, Riggs scored his second touchdown of the game. The Redskins' 24–0 lead midway through the 3rd quarter was the largest shutout lead in Super Bowl history at the time; The San Francisco 49ers had led the Cincinnati Bengals 20–0 at halftime in Super Bowl XVI. The Seattle Seahawks led the Denver Broncos 36-0 right before the final play of the third quarter of Super Bowl XLVIII.

The Bills finally got some momentum going with their next few drives. First, they drove 77 yards to the Redskins 3 yard-line, aided by a 43-yard completion from Kelly to receiver Don Beebe. Washington kept Buffalo out of the end zone, but kicker Scott Norwood kicked a 21-yard field goal to cut their deficit to 24–3. Then aided by a 29-yard pass interference penalty on Redskins cornerback Martin Mayhew in the end zone, the Bills finally scored a touchdown on their next drive with a 1-yard run by Thomas to make the score 24–10.

The two teams combined for the most points in a 3rd quarter in a Super Bowl history (24 total points: 14 for Washington and 10 for Buffalo) and the most combined in a second half (44 total points: 24 for Buffalo and 20 for Washington).

But Buffalo's hopes of a comeback faded when Washington advanced 79 yards in 11 plays on their ensuing drive, scoring on Clark's 30-yard touchdown reception to give the Redskins a 31–10 lead with 1:24 left in the third period. Then 3 plays after receiving the ensuing kickoff, Kelly fumbled the ball while being sacked by defensive back Alvoid Mays, and it was recovered by defensive end Fred Stokes. After the turnover, Washington drove to the Bills 7-yard line and increased their lead to 34–10 with Lohmiller's 25-yard field goal on the second play of the fourth quarter.

Then on the Bills ensuing drive, Kelly was sacked for a 9-yard loss by Stokes, threw an incomplete pass, and then threw his second interception of the game to Edwards, who returned it 35 yards to Buffalo's 33-yard line. Five plays later, Lohmiller kicked his second field goal with 11:36 left in the game to increase Washington's lead to 37–10. With the game almost completely out of reach, the Bills managed to respond with a 15-play, 79-yard drive to cut the score to 37–17 on a 2-yard touchdown pass from Kelly to Metzelaars. Then, after recovering an onside kick, the Bills drove 50 yards and scored another touchdown with Beebe's 4-yard reception to make the score 37–24. But the Bills’ second onside kick attempt was unsuccessful and the Redskins were able to run out the clock. From there, the Bills attempted one final pass play before time expired.

Kelly, completed 28 of a Super Bowl-record 58 passes for 275 yards and two touchdowns, but was sacked four times, intercepted four times, and lost one fumble. Thomas ran for only 13 yards on 10 carries and was limited to 27 yards on four receptions. James Lofton was the top receiver for the Bills with 7 catches for 92 yards. But Reed was limited to just 5 catches for 31 yards. Clark had seven catches for 114 yards and a touchdown and Monk added seven for 113 yards. (Clark and Monk became the third pair of teammates to each have 100 yards receiving in a Super Bowl; they joined the Steelers’ John Stallworth and Lynn Swann who did it in Super Bowl XIII and the Bengals’ Cris Collinsworth and Dan Ross who did it in Super Bowl XVI).

== Awards and records ==
- Led NFL in Total Yards Rushing, 2,381 yards
- Led AFC in Points Scored, 458
- Led AFC in Yards Gained, 6,252
- Jim Kelly, NFL Leader, Touchdown Passes, 33
- Jim Kelly, AFC Leader, Passer Rating, 97.6
- Jim Kelly, Super Bowl record, Most Passes Attempted in a Super Bowl, 58
- Thurman Thomas, NFL MVP
- Thurman Thomas, UPI AFL-AFC Player of the Year
- Thurman Thomas, NEA NFL MVP
- Thurman Thomas, PFWA NFL MVP
- Thurman Thomas, NFL Offensive Player of the Year
- Thurman Thomas, 1991 All-Pro Selection
- Thurman Thomas, NFL Combined Yards from Scrimmage Leader
- Thurman Thomas, AFC Leader, 1,407 Rushing Yards
- Thurman Thomas, AFC Leader, 12 Touchdowns
