= 1991 Chicago Bears season =

NFL team season

- Owner: Virginia Halas McCaskey
- General manager: Bill Tobin
- Head coach: Mike Ditka
- Offensive coordinator: Greg Landry
- Defensive coordinator: Vince Tobin
- Home stadium: Soldier Field

Results
- Record: 11–5
- Division place: 2nd NFC Central
- Playoffs: Lost Wild Card Playoffs (vs. Cowboys) 13–17

The 1991 Chicago Bears season was their 72nd regular season and 21st postseason completed in the National Football League (NFL). The Bears matched their 11–5 record from the previous season and returned to the playoffs for the seventh time in eight years, as an NFC Wild Card for the second consecutive year. The Bears were defeated 17–13 by the Dallas Cowboys in the Wild Card Round. This was Mike Ditka's last playoff game as a head coach.

== Offseason ==
=== NFL draft ===
1991 Chicago Bears draft
Round	Pick	Player	Position	College	Notes
1	22	Stan Thomas	Offensive tackle	Texas	
2	49	Chris Zorich	Defensive tackle	Notre Dame	
3	78	Chris Gardocki *	Punter	Clemson	
4	105	Joe Johnson	Cornerback	North Carolina State	
5	134	Anthony Morgan	Wide receiver	Tennessee	
6	161	Darren Lewis	Running back	Texas A&M	
7	190	Paul Justin	Quarterback	Arizona State	
8	217	Larry Horton	Defensive back	Texas A&M	
9	245	Mike Stonebreaker	Linebacker	Notre Dame	
10	272	Tom Backes	Defensive end	Oklahoma	
11	301	Stacy Long	Guard	Clemson	
12	328	John Cook	Defensive tackle	Washington	
Made roster * Made at least one Pro Bowl during career

=== Undrafted free agents ===
1991 undrafted free agents of note
Player	Position	College
Scott Asman	Tight end	West Chester
Sean Beckton	Wide receiver	UCF
Richard Booker	Linebacker	TCU
Peter Brantley	Linebacker	Oregon
Sean Brown	Wide receiver	Wake Forest
Nigel Codrington	Wide receiver	Rice
Tim Cross	Fullback	Tennessee State
Anthony Cummings	Wide receiver	Louisville
Ron Ferguson	Cornerback	Texas Tech
Tre Giller	Tackle	SMU
John Hardy	Cornerback	California
Eric Ihnat	Tight end	Marshall
Michael Johnson	Wide receiver	Sacramento State
Tim Lance	Safety	Eastern Illinois
Steve Montgomery	Fullback	Michigan State
Patrick Moore	Defensive end	Cal Poly
Quintin Parker	Safety	Illinois
Chris Reed	Guard	SW Missouri State
Charles Rowe	Linebacker	Texas Tech
Eric Wenckowski	Center	Northern Illinois
John Wiley	Safety	Auburn
James Williams	Defensive tackle	Cheyney
Eric Wright	Wide receiver	Stephen F. Austin

== Staff ==
1991 Chicago Bears staff
Front office: Chairman of the board – Ed McCaskey; President and chief executive officer – Michael McCaskey; Vice-president of player personnel – Bill Tobin; Director of finance – Ted Phillips; Assistant director of player personnel – Rod Graves; Research and quality control – Jim LaRue; Head coaches: Head coach – Mike Ditka; Assistant head coach/tight ends/special teams coordinator – Steve Kazor; Offensive coaches: Offensive coordinator – Greg Landry; Running backs – Johnny Roland; Wide receivers – Vic Rapp; Offensive line – Dick Stanfel	Defensive coaches: Defensive coordinator – Vince Tobin; Defensive line – John Levra; Linebackers – Dave McGinnis; Defensive backs – Zaven Yaralian; Strength and conditioning: Strength coordinator – Clyde Emrich

== Roster ==
1991 Chicago Bears roster
Quarterbacks (QB): 4 Jim Harbaugh; 10 Peter Tom Willis; Running backs (RB): 35 Neal Anderson; 22 Johnny Bailey; 31 Mark Green; 33 Darren Lewis; 25 Brad Muster FB; 30 James Rouse FB; Wide receivers (WR): 82 Wendell Davis; 29 Dennis Gentry KR; 88 Glen Kozlowski; 81 Anthony Morgan KR; 87 Tom Waddle; Tight ends (TE): 85 Keith Jennings; 80 James Thornton	Offensive linemen (OL): 62 Mark Bortz G; 67 Jerry Fontenot G; 63 Jay Hilgenberg C; 75 Ron Mattes T; 57 Tom Thayer G; 60 Stan Thomas T; 78 Keith Van Horne T; 73 John Wojciechowski T; Defensive linemen (DL): 93 Trace Armstrong DE; 95 Richard Dent DE; 76 Steve McMichael DT; 72 William Perry DT; 96 Tim Ryan DE; 71 James Williams DE; 97 Chris Zorich DT	Linebackers (LB): 53 Dante Jones MLB; 51 Jim Morrissey OLB; 59 Ron Rivera OLB; 55 John Roper OLB; 50 Mike Singletary MLB; 58 Mike Stonebreaker OLB; Defensive backs (DB): 20 Mark Carrier FS; 37 Maurice Douglass CB; 23 Shaun Gayle SS; 26 John Mangum CB; 36 Markus Paul SS; 32 Lemuel Stinson CB; 49 David Tate S; 21 Donnell Woolford CB; Special teams (ST): 8 Maury Buford P; 6 Kevin Butler K; 17 Chris Gardocki P	Practice squad: 98 Tom Backes T; 89 Eric Ihnat TE; 11 Paul Justin QB; 46 James P. Lott CB; 83 Eric Wright WR; Reserve: 86 Cap Boso TE (IR); 74 Jim Covert T (IR); 54 Ron Cox LB (IR); 70 Eric Kumerow DE (IR); 65 Stacy Long G (IR); 84 Ron Morris WR (IR); -- Quintin Smith WR (PUP); 47 active, 7 inactive, 5 practice squad Rookies in italics

== Preseason ==
Week	Date	Opponent	Result	Record	Venue	Attendance
1	July 26	at Miami Dolphins	W 6–0	1–0	Joe Robbie Stadium	49,939
2	August 3	vs. San Francisco 49ers	L 7–21	1–1	Olympiastadion (Berlin)	66,876
3	August 11	Phoenix Cardinals	L 10–12	1–2	Soldier Field	55,513
4	August 17	at Los Angeles Raiders	L 10–13	1–3	Los Angeles Memorial Coliseum	35,538
5	August 24	Buffalo Bills	W 30–13	2–3	Soldier Field	57,435

== Regular season ==
=== Schedule ===
Week	Date	Opponent	Result	Record	Venue	Attendance
1	September 1	**Minnesota Vikings**	**W** 10–6	1–0	Soldier Field	64,112
2	September 8	at **Tampa Bay Buccaneers**	**W** 21–20	2–0	Tampa Stadium	65,625
3	September 15	New York Giants	**W** 20–17	3–0	Soldier Field	64,829
4	September 23	New York Jets	**W** 19–13 (OT)	4–0	Soldier Field	65,255
5	September 29	at Buffalo Bills	**L** 20–35	4–1	Rich Stadium	80,366
6	October 6	Washington Redskins	**L** 7–20	4–2	Soldier Field	64,941
7	Bye					
8	October 17	at **Green Bay Packers**	**W** 10–0	5–2	Lambeau Field	58,435
9	October 27	at New Orleans Saints	**W** 20–17	6–2	Louisiana Superdome	68,591
10	November 3	Detroit Lions	**W** 20–10	7–2	Soldier Field	57,281
11	November 11	at **Minnesota Vikings**	**W** 34–17	8–2	Hubert H. Humphrey Metrodome	59,001
12	November 17	at Indianapolis Colts	**W** 31–17	9–2	Hoosier Dome	60,519
13	November 24	Miami Dolphins	**L** 13–16 (OT)	9–3	Soldier Field	58,288
14	November 28	at **Detroit Lions**	**L** 6–16	9–4	Pontiac Silverdome	78,879
15	December 8	**Green Bay Packers**	**W** 27–13	10–4	Soldier Field	62,353
16	December 14	**Tampa Bay Buccaneers**	**W** 27–0	11–4	Soldier Field	54,719
17	December 23	at San Francisco 49ers	**L** 14–52	11–5	Candlestick Park	60,419
Note: Intra-division opponents are in **bold** text.

=== Game summaries ===
==== Week 1: vs. Minnesota Vikings ====
Week 1: Minnesota Vikings at Chicago Bears – Game summary

Quarter	1	2	3	4	Total
Vikings	3	0	3	0	**6**
**Bears**	0	7	0	3	**10**

at Soldier Field, Chicago, Illinois

- Date: September 1
- Game time: 3:00 p.m. CST
- Game weather: Mostly sunny, 68 °F (20 °C)
- Game attendance: 64,112
- Referee: Tom Dooley (6)
- TV announcers (CBS): Verne Lundquist and John Madden
- Box score, Game Book

Game information

**First quarter**

- MIN – Fuad Reveiz 26-yard field goal, 5:50. Vikings 3–0. **Drive: 13 plays, 72 yards, 5:50.**

**Second quarter**

- CHI – Tom Waddle 37-yard pass from Jim Harbaugh (Kevin Butler kick), 14:05. Bears 7–3. **Drive: 10 plays, 98 yards, 5:38.**

**Third quarter**

- MIN – Fuad Reveiz 24-yard field goal, 9:31. Bears 7–6. **Drive: 11 plays, 60 yards, 5:20.**

**Fourth quarter**

- CHI – Kevin Butler 22-yard field goal, 9:06. Bears 10–6. **Drive: 10 plays, 45 yards, 5:58.**

**Top passers**

- MIN – Wade Wilson – 21/36, 248 yards, 3 INT
- CHI – Jim Harbaugh – 17/24, 186 yards, TD

**Top rushers**

- MIN – Herschel Walker – 20 rushes, 86 yards
- CHI – Neal Anderson – 23 rushes, 58 yards

**Top receivers**

- MIN – Steve Jordan – 8 receptions, 89 yards
- CHI – Tom Waddle – 2 receptions, 48 yards, TD

==== Week 10: vs. Detroit Lions ====
Week Ten: Detroit Lions at Chicago Bears – Game summary

Quarter	1	2	3	4	Total
Lions	0	10	0	0	**10**
**Bears**	3	0	10	7	**20**

at Soldier Field, Chicago, Illinois

- Date: November 3
- Game time: 12:00 p.m. CST
- Game weather: 18 °F (−8 °C)
- Game attendance: 57,281
- Referee: Bob McElwee
- TV announcers (CBS): Pat Summerall and John Madden
- Box score

=== Standings ===
NFC Central
	W	L	T	PCT	DIV	CONF	PF	PA	STK
^{(2)} Detroit Lions	12	4	0	.750	6–2	8–4	339	295	W6
^{(4)} Chicago Bears	11	5	0	.688	7–1	9–3	299	269	L1
Minnesota Vikings	8	8	0	.500	3–5	8–6	301	306	L1
Green Bay Packers	4	12	0	.250	3–5	3–9	273	313	W1
Tampa Bay Buccaneers	3	13	0	.188	1–7	2–10	199	365	W1

== Playoffs ==
Round	Date	Opponent (seed)	Result	Record	Venue	Attendance
Wild Card	December 29	Dallas Cowboys (5)	L 13–17	0–1	Soldier Field	62,594
