= 1991 Miami Dolphins season =

26th season in franchise history

- Owner: Joe Robbie
- General manager: Eddie Jones
- Head coach: Don Shula
- Home stadium: Joe Robbie Stadium

Results
- Record: 8–8
- Division place: 3rd AFC East
- Playoffs: Did not qualify
- Pro Bowlers: 3 QB Dan Marino; WR Mark Clayton; T Richmond Webb

The 1991 Miami Dolphins season was the team's 26th as a member of the National Football League. The Dolphins failed to improve upon their previous season's output of 12–4, winning only eight games and failing to qualify for the playoffs.

== Offseason ==
=== NFL draft ===
Round	Pick	Player	Position	School/Club team
1	23	Randal Hill	Wide receiver	Miami (FL)
3	60	Aaron Craver	Running back	Fresno State
5	113	Bryan Cox	Linebacker	Western Illinois
5	121	Gene Williams	Guard	Iowa State
7	191	Chris Green	Defensive back	Illinois
8	220	Roland Smith	Defensive back	Miami (FL)
9	246	Scott Miller	Wide receiver	UCLA
10	275	Michael Titley	Tight end	Iowa
11	302	Ernie Rogers	Guard	California
12	331	Joe Brunson	Defensive tackle	Tennessee-Chattanooga

=== Undrafted free agents ===
1991 undrafted free agent of note
Player	Position	College
Chuck Klingbeil	Defensive tackle	Northern Michigan

== Personnel ==
=== Staff ===
1991 Miami Dolphins staff
Front office: President – Tim Robbie; Executive vice president/general manager – Eddie Jones; Assistant general manager – Bryan Wiedmeier; Director of player personnel – Charley Winner; Director of college scouting – Tom Heckert, Sr.; Head coaches: Head coach – Don Shula; Assistant head coach/offensive line – John Sandusky; Offensive coaches: Quarterbacks/pass offense – Gary Stevens; Offensive backs – Carl Taseff; Wide receivers – Larry Seiple; Coaches’ Assistant – Tony Nathan; Coaches’ Assistant – Mike Shula	Defensive coaches: Defense – Tom Olivadotti; Defensive line – Dan Sekanovich; Linebackers – George Hill; Defensive backs – Mel Phillips; Special teams coaches: Special teams – Mike Westhoff; Strength and conditioning: Strength and conditioning – Junior Wade

=== Roster ===
1991 Miami Dolphins roster
Quarterbacks (QB): 13 Dan Marino; 19 Scott Mitchell; 9 Scott Secules; Running backs (RB): 34 Aaron Craver KR; 21 Mark Higgs; 20 Marc Logan KR; 49 Tony Paige FB; 33 Sammie Smith; Wide receivers (WR): 83 Mark Clayton; 85 Mark Duper; 11 Jim Jensen; 89 Tony Martin; 82 Scott Miller PR; 87 Mike Williams; Tight ends (TE): 84 Greg Baty LS; 80 Ferrell Edmunds	Offensive linemen (OL): 65 Jeff Dellenbach T; 74 Mark Dennis T; 62 Harry Galbreath G; 69 Keith Sims G; 63 Jeff Uhlenhake C; 78 Richmond Webb T; 60 Bert Weidner C/G; 61 Gene Williams G; Defensive linemen (DL): 91 Jeff Cross DE; 79 Donnie Gardner DE; 99 Chuck Klingbeil NT; 67 Pat Swoopes NT; 95 T. J. Turner	Linebackers (LB): 53 Ned Bolcar ILB; 50 Louis Cooper OLB; 51 Bryan Cox OLB; 55 Hugh Green OLB; 92 David Griggs OLB; 54 E. J. Junior LB; 93 Cliff Odom ILB; 52 Mike Reichenbach ILB; Defensive backs (DB): 37 J. B. Brown CB; 42 Chris Green CB; 45 Bobby Harden SS; 48 Mike Iaquaniello S; 24 Vestee Jackson CB; 44 Paul Lankford CB; 28 Mike McGruder CB; 25 Louis Oliver FS; Special teams (ST): 4 Reggie Roby P; 10 Pete Stoyanovich K	Practice squad: 94 Joe Brunson NT; 2 Cisco Richard RB; 68 Blaine Rose G; 58 Mark Sander LB; 90 Mike Titley TE; Reserve: 86 Fred Banks WR (IR); 35 Kerry Glenn CB (IR); 59 John Grimsley LB (IR); 29 Liffort Hobley S (PUP); 98 Shawn Lee NT (IR); 32 Garrett Limbrick RB (IR); -- Bruce McNorton CB (IR); 27 Stevon Moore S (IR); 56 John Offerdahl LB (IR); 96 Alfred Oglesby NT (IR); 73 James Parrish T (PUP); 90 Terry Price DE (IR); 23 Pat Ray CB (IR); 30 Don Smith RB (IR); 26 Jarvis Williams S (IR); Rookies in italics 47 active, 15 reserve, 5 practice squad

== Preseason ==
Week	Date	Opponent	Result	Record	Venue	Attendance
1	July 26	Chicago Bears	L 0–6	0–1	Joe Robbie Stadium	49,939
2	August 4	vs. Los Angeles Raiders	W 19–17	1–1	Tokyo Dome	51,122
3	August 10	at Tampa Bay Buccaneers	W 29–13	2–1	Tampa Stadium	51,387
4	August 19	at Denver Broncos	L 13–21	2–2	Mile High Stadium	72,555

== Regular season ==
=== Schedule ===
Week	Date	Opponent	Result	Record	Venue	Attendance
1	September 1	at **Buffalo Bills**	**L** 31–35	0–1	Rich Stadium	80,252
2	September 8	**Indianapolis Colts**	**W** 17–6	1–1	Joe Robbie Stadium	51,155
3	September 15	at Detroit Lions	**L** 13–17	1–2	Pontiac Silverdome	56,896
4	September 22	Green Bay Packers	**W** 16–13	2–2	Joe Robbie Stadium	56,583
5	September 29	at **New York Jets**	**L** 23–41	2–3	Giants Stadium	71,170
6	October 6	at **New England Patriots**	**W** 20–10	3–3	Sullivan Stadium	49,749
7	October 13	at Kansas City Chiefs	**L** 7–42	3–4	Arrowhead Stadium	76,021
8	October 20	Houston Oilers	**L** 13–17	3–5	Joe Robbie Stadium	60,705
9	Bye					
10	November 3	at **Indianapolis Colts**	**W** 10–6	4–5	Hoosier Dome	55,899
11	November 10	**New England Patriots**	**W** 30–20	5–5	Joe Robbie Stadium	56,065
12	November 18	**Buffalo Bills**	**L** 27–41	5–6	Joe Robbie Stadium	71,062
13	November 24	at Chicago Bears	**W** 16–13 (OT)	6–6	Soldier Field	58,288
14	December 1	Tampa Bay Buccaneers	**W** 33–14	7–6	Joe Robbie Stadium	51,036
15	December 9	Cincinnati Bengals	**W** 37–13	8–6	Joe Robbie Stadium	60,616
16	December 15	at San Diego Chargers	**L** 30–38	8–7	Jack Murphy Stadium	47,731
17	December 22	**New York Jets**	**L** 20–23 (OT)	8–8	Joe Robbie Stadium	69,636
Note: Intra-division opponents are in **bold** text.

=== Standings ===
AFC East
	W	L	T	PCT	DIV	CONF	PF	PA	STK
^{(1)} Buffalo Bills	13	3	0	.813	7–1	10–2	458	318	L1
^{(6)} New York Jets	8	8	0	.500	4–4	6–6	314	293	W1
Miami Dolphins	8	8	0	.500	4–4	5–7	343	349	L2
New England Patriots	6	10	0	.375	4–4	5–9	211	305	L1
Indianapolis Colts	1	15	0	.063	1–7	1–11	143	381	L6

== Team Performance ==
The Miami Dolphins of 1991 were far less competitive than in the prior year, winning only 8 games, and missing the playoffs for the 6th time in 8 years. The Dolphins saw a drastic decline in their defensive performance in 1991 dropping from 4th in the NFL in 1990, to 24th. In 4 of their 8 losses, the defense blew 4th quarter leads. The offense, however, led by 29 year old future hall of fame QB Dan Marino improved from 14th in the NFL in 1990, to 6th. Marino earned a Pro Bowl berth after finishing 2nd in passing yards (3,970), 4th in passing TDs (25), and while throwing only 13 interceptions. The Dolphins offense continued to be among the best in the league, finishing first in 4th Down conversions. The dismal Dolphins running attack was 25th in the league in rushing yards and 24th in rushing TDs which failed to provide balance, causing the team to be one-dimensional offensively. With respect to team discipline the Dolphins were excellent, being the least penalized team in 1991.
