= Mo Lewis =

American football player (born 1969)

No. 57
- Position: Linebacker

Personal information
- Born: October 21, 1969 (age 57); Atlanta, Georgia, U.S.
- Listed height: 6 ft 3 in (1.91 m)
- Listed weight: 258 lb (117 kg)

Career information
- High school: Murphy (Atlanta)
- College: Georgia
- NFL draft: 1991: 3rd round, 63rd overall pick

Career history
- New York Jets (1991–2003)

Awards and highlights
- First-team All-Pro (1998); Second-team All-Pro (2000); 3× Pro Bowl (1998–2000); PFWA All-Rookie Team (1991); 2× Second-team All-SEC (1989, 1990)

Career NFL statistics
- Tackles: 1,232
- Sacks: 52.5
- Interceptions: 14
- Forced fumbles: 28
- Fumble recoveries: 12
- Touchdowns: 5
- Stats at Pro Football Reference

Morris Clyde Lewis III (born October 21, 1969) is an American former professional football linebacker who played in the National Football League (NFL) for 13 seasons with the New York Jets. He played college football for the Georgia Bulldogs, earning two consecutive second-team All-SEC honors. Lewis was selected by the Jets in the third round of the 1991 NFL draft.

During his Jets career, Lewis received three consecutive Pro Bowl selections and one first-team All-Pro honor. He is also known for his inadvertent role in starting the New England Patriots dynasty when he injured Patriots quarterback Drew Bledsoe in 2001, leading to Tom Brady taking over the team.

== Career ==
Pre-draft measurables
Height	Weight	Arm length	Hand span	Bench press
6 ft 2 in (1.88 m)	240 lb (109 kg)	32 1/2 in (0.83 m)	9 7/8 in (0.25 m)	20 reps
All values from NFL Combine

Lewis was a star at the University of Georgia, wearing the number 57 as he would in his pro career. Lewis played 200 games as a Jet, the third-longest tenure in franchise history, and was one of the most loved team players and captains of his time. He was a three-time Pro Bowler (1998, 1999, 2000), was the Jets' defensive captain from 1997 to 2003 and was named to the NFL All-Pro team after the 1998 season. Lewis retired after the 2003 season with 1,231 tackles (883 solo), 52.5 sacks, 14 interceptions for 241 yards, 79 pass deflections, 29 forced fumbles, 13 fumble recoveries for 74 yards and five defensive touchdowns in 200 career games.

== NFL career statistics ==
Legend
	Led the league
**Bold**	Career high

=== Regular season ===
Year	Team	Games		Tackles				Interceptions				Fumbles			
Year	Team	GP	GS	Cmb	Solo	Ast	Sck	Int	Yds	TD	Lng	FF	FR	Yds	TD
1991	NYJ	16	15	76	76	0	1.0	0	0	0	0	3	1	0	0
1992	NYJ	16	16	145	145	0	2.0	1	1	0	1	3	**4**	22	0
1993	NYJ	16	16	**158**	**158**	0	4.0	2	4	0	4	**4**	0	0	0
1994	NYJ	16	16	130	103	27	6.0	**4**	**106**	**2**	**67**	3	1	11	0
1995	NYJ	16	16	111	82	29	5.0	2	22	1	15	2	0	0	0
1996	NYJ	9	9	43	32	11	0.5	0	0	0	0	0	0	0	0
1997	NYJ	16	16	72	45	27	8.0	1	43	1	43	2	1	**26**	0
1998	NYJ	16	16	81	67	14	7.0	1	11	0	11	1	1	0	0
1999	NYJ	16	16	89	59	30	5.5	0	0	0	0	3	1	0	0
2000	NYJ	16	16	89	65	24	**10.0**	1	23	0	23	2	1	0	0
2001	NYJ	16	16	108	77	**31**	3.0	1	17	0	17	2	2	15	**1**
2002	NYJ	16	16	82	68	14	0.5	1	14	0	14	0	0	0	0
2003	NYJ	15	15	48	34	14	0.0	0	0	0	0	1	0	0	0
Career		200	199	1,232	1,011	221	52.5	14	241	4	67	26	12	74	1

=== Playoffs ===
Year	Team	Games		Tackles				Interceptions				Fumbles			
Year	Team	GP	GS	Cmb	Solo	Ast	Sck	Int	Yds	TD	Lng	FF	FR	Yds	TD
1991	NYJ	1	1	0	0	0	**2.0**	0	0	0	0	0	0	0	0
1998	NYJ	2	2	**13**	7	**6**	0.0	0	0	0	0	0	0	0	0
2001	NYJ	1	1	5	4	1	0.0	0	0	0	0	0	0	0	0
2002	NYJ	2	2	12	**11**	1	1.0	0	0	0	0	**1**	0	0	0
Career		6	6	30	22	8	3.0	0	0	0	0	1	0	0	0

== Impact on NFL history ==
While Lewis had a productive career, he is best known for being the catalyst for starting the New England Patriots dynasty that would span two decades. During an early-season game against the Patriots in 2001, Lewis leveled Patriots quarterback Drew Bledsoe with a hard, but clean hit. Bledsoe was about to dive for the first-down marker, but defensive end Shaun Ellis clipped Bledsoe's ankles, resulting in Bledsoe taking the full force of the hit while standing straight up. On the next drive, Bledsoe briefly re-entered the game before leaving. Tom Brady, a sixth-round draft pick in the 2000 NFL draft, was the backup quarterback and finished the game.

It turned out that Lewis' hit sheared a blood vessel in Bledsoe's chest, causing Bledsoe to lose a pint of blood an hour. Lewis was unaware of the injury, having assumed Bledsoe had simply suffered a concussion since he returned to the game. Bledsoe would never regain his starting job (he was traded to Buffalo after the season). The Patriots went 11–3 for the remainder of the season with Brady under center, culminating in the team's first Super Bowl title on February 3, 2002.

Over the next two decades, the Patriots won six Super Bowl titles and Brady would win a seventh in Tampa Bay. As a result, Lewis' hit on Bledsoe is often noted for its impact on NFL history. The hit appeared on the NFL's list of 100 greatest game changers, ranking at 82. Sports personality Rich Eisen considers the hit the most impactful play in NFL history.

Lewis has asserted his tackle was routine and the resulting injury incidental. Speaking with Gary Myers for his 2025 book on the Brady–Belichick era, he explained:

"It's really irrelevant to me. It was just another play to me. To you all, it's a big game-changing, history-changing play. I've never gone back to watch the play. If people want to talk about it, I don't hide from it. But it has no importance to me."

== Personal life ==
Lewis and his wife, Christalyn, live in Atlanta, Georgia and have two sons.

Following his retirement from football, Lewis briefly worked in business before stopping due to the lingering effects of a hip injury he suffered during the 2002 season. He generally distanced himself from the Jets after retiring, only keeping in touch with some teammates; Marvin Jones theorized Lewis had "some bitterness about some stuff" from his football career.
