= Mark Boyer =

American football player (born 1962)

No. 84, 80 ,88
- Position: Tight end

Personal information
- Born: September 16, 1962 (age 64); Huntington Beach, California, U.S.
- Listed height: 6 ft 4 in (1.93 m)
- Listed weight: 252 lb (114 kg)

Career information
- High school: Edison (Huntington Beach)
- College: USC
- NFL draft: 1985: 9th round, 229th overall pick

Career history
- Indianapolis Colts (1985–1989); New York Jets (1990–1992)

Career NFL statistics
- Receptions: 170
- Receiving yards: 1,534
- Touchdowns: 6
- Stats at Pro Football Reference

Mark Boyer (born September 16, 1962) is an American former professional football player who was a tight end in the National Football League (NFL). he played college football for the USC Trojans

== Early life ==
Boyer prepped at Edison High School in Huntington Beach.

== College career ==
Boyer played college football at the University of Southern California. He graduated in 1985 with a bachelor of science in business administration. While at USC, Mark was a four-year letterman in football, helping lead the Trojans to a Pac-10 championship in 1984 and a win over Ohio State in the 1985 Rose Bowl.

== Professional career ==
Boyer played tight end from 1985 to 1992 for the Indianapolis Colts and New York Jets of the NFL.

In 1985, Mark was selected 229th overall in the ninth round by the Colts as a tight end and played for the Colts for 5 years. In 1990, he signed with the Jets as a free agent and played another 3 years. Boyer was known as a prolific blocker, helping Eric Dickerson lead the NFL in rushing in 1988 and the Jets to be a top 5 NFL rushing team in 1990 and 1991. Solid hands helped him catch 170 passes for over 1,500 yards and 6 touchdowns through 114 career games. After 8 seasons in the NFL, Mark retired in 1994 due to a back injury.

== NFL career statistics ==
Legend
**Bold**	Career high

=== Regular season ===
Year	Team	Games		Receiving				
Year	Team	GP	GS	Rec	Yds	Avg	Lng	TD
1985	IND	**16**	7	25	274	**11.0**	33	0
1986	IND	**16**	7	22	237	10.8	**38**	1
1987	IND	7	6	10	73	7.3	15	0
1988	IND	**16**	13	27	256	9.5	24	**2**
1989	IND	**16**	5	11	58	5.3	15	**2**
1990	NYJ	**16**	**16**	**40**	**334**	8.4	25	1
1991	NYJ	11	10	16	153	9.6	22	0
1992	NYJ	**16**	**16**	19	149	7.8	23	0
Total		114	80	170	1,534	9.0	38	6

=== Playoffs ===
Year	Team	Games		Receiving				
Year	Team	GP	GS	Rec	Yds	Avg	Lng	TD
1987	IND	**1**	0	0	0	0.0	0	0
1991	NYJ	**1**	**1**	**3**	**20**	**6.7**	**11**	0
Total		2	1	3	20	6.7	11	0
