= Brad Lamb (American football) =

American football player (born 1967)

No. 81
- Position: Wide receiver

Personal information
- Born: October 7, 1967 (age 59); Springboro, Ohio, U.S.
- Listed height: 5 ft 10 in (1.78 m)
- Listed weight: 171 lb (78 kg)

Career information
- High school: Springboro
- College: Anderson (IN)
- NFL draft: 1991: 8th round, 222nd overall pick

Career history
- Buffalo Bills (1991–1993); Green Bay Packers (1995)*
- * Offseason or practice squad member only

Career NFL statistics
- Receptions: 7
- Receiving yards: 139
- Stats at Pro Football Reference

Brad Lamb (born October 7, 1967) is an American former professional football player who was a wide receiver for the Buffalo Bills of the National Football League (NFL) from 1992 to 1993. He played college football for the Anderson Ravens. He was selected by the Bills in the eighth round of the 1991 NFL draft with the 222nd overall pick.
