= Dennis Price (American football) =

American football player (born 1965)

No. 20, 38
- Position: Defensive back

Personal information
- Born: June 14, 1965 (age 61); Los Angeles, California, U.S.
- Listed height: 6 ft 1 in (1.85 m)
- Listed weight: 175 lb (79 kg)

Career information
- High school: Long Beach Polytechnic (Long Beach, California)
- College: UCLA
- NFL draft: 1988: 5th round, 131st overall pick

Career history
- Los Angeles Raiders (1988–1990); New York Jets (1990-1992)

Awards and highlights
- Second-team All-Pac-10 (1987)

Career NFL statistics
- Interceptions: 3
- Stats at Pro Football Reference

Dennis Sean Price (born June 14, 1965) is an American former professional football player who was a defensive back for the Los Angeles Raiders and New York Jets of the National Football League (NFL). He played college football for the UCLA Bruins.

== NFL career ==
=== Los Angeles Raiders ===
==== 1988 season ====
Price was selected in the fifth round of the 1988 NFL draft by his hometown team, the Los Angeles Raiders, with the 131st pick overall. In his first season, he played in 12 games, four of which he started. He also made two interceptions during the 1988 season for a total of 18 returning yards. However, he suffered a groin injury later in the season, which sidelined him.

==== 1989 season ====
Price switched from jersey number 38 to 20 before the 1989 season. He played in five games that season: the Raiders' first game of the season, against the San Diego Chargers, and the final four games of the season, against the Denver Broncos, Phoenix Cardinals, Seattle Seahawks, and New York Giants.

=== New York Jets ===
After tearing his ACL, Price was traded to the New York Jets on October 15, 1990, for linebacker Alex Gordon. He appeared in 14 games with the Jets during the 1992 season and logged one interception. He was waived by the Jets in August 1993.

== Personal life ==
Price and his wife Letitia have two children, Sheldon and Kylie. Sheldon is currently a free agent cornerback who has previously played with the Indianapolis Colts, Baltimore Ravens, and Kansas City Chiefs.
