= Keo Coleman =

American football player (born 1970)

No. 99, 54
- Position: Linebacker

Personal information
- Born: May 1, 1970 (age 56); Los Angeles, California, U.S.
- Listed height: 6 ft 1 in (1.85 m)
- Listed weight: 255 lb (116 kg)

Career information
- High school: Milwaukee Tech
- College: Mississippi State
- NFL draft: 1992: 4th round, 69th overall pick

Career history
- New York Jets (1992); Green Bay Packers (1993); Tampa Bay Storm (1998–2002)

Awards and highlights
- First-team All-SEC (1991)

Career NFL statistics
- Fumble recoveries: 1
- Stats at Pro Football Reference

Career AFL statistics
- Tackles: 24
- Sacks: 2
- Passes defended: 4
- Stats at ArenaFan.com

Keo Coleman (born May 1, 1970) is a former linebacker in the National Football League (NFL).

== Biography ==
Coleman was born Keombani Coleman in Los Angeles, California. He attended high school in Milwaukee, Wisconsin.

== Career ==
Coleman was selected in the fourth round of the 1992 NFL draft by the New York Jets and spent that season with the team. He would spend the 1993 NFL season with the Green Bay Packers. After leaving the NFL he would join the Tampa Bay Storm of the Arena Football League.

He played at the collegiate level at Navarro College and Mississippi State University.
