= Eric Wright (wide receiver) =

American football player (born 1969)

No. 83
- Position: Wide receiver

Personal information
- Born: August 4, 1969 (age 57); Pittsburg, Texas, U.S.
- Listed height: 6 ft 0 in (1.83 m)
- Listed weight: 196 lb (89 kg)

Career information
- High school: Pittsburg
- College: Stephen F. Austin
- NFL draft: 1991: undrafted

Career history
- Chicago Bears (1991–1992); Orlando Predators (1995–1996)

Career NFL statistics
- Receptions: 5
- Receiving yards: 56
- Stats at Pro Football Reference

Career AFL statistics
- Receptions: 39
- Receiving yards: 522
- Total touchdowns: 12
- Stats at ArenaFan.com

Eric LaMon Wright (born August 4, 1969) is an American former professional football player who was a wide receiver for the Chicago Bears of the National Football League (NFL) from 1991 to 1992. He played college football for the Stephen F. Austin Lumberjacks.
