= Brad Baxter =

American football player (born 1967)

No. 30
- Position: Fullback

Personal information
- Born: May 5, 1967 (age 59); Dothan, Alabama, U.S.
- Listed height: 6 ft 1 in (1.85 m)
- Listed weight: 235 lb (107 kg)

Career information
- High school: Slocomb (AL)
- College: Alabama State
- NFL draft: 1989: 11th round, 303rd overall pick

Career history
- Minnesota Vikings (1989)*; New York Jets (1989–1995); Detroit Lions (1997)*
- * Offseason or practice squad member only

Career NFL statistics
- Rushing yards: 2,928
- Rushing average: 3.8
- Rushing touchdowns: 35
- Stats at Pro Football Reference

Herman Brad Baxter (born May 5, 1967) is an American former professional football player who was a fullback in the National Football League (NFL) from 1989 to 1995. He played college football for the Alabama State Hornets. Selected by the Minnesota Vikings in the 11th round of the 1989 NFL draft, Baxter failed to make the team but caught on with the New York Jets.

After not seeing the field in 1989 Baxter, the team's starting fullback, made his mark in 1990 by rushing for 539 yards on 124 carries in ten starts. Baxter had perhaps his best year as a pro in 1991, as his eleven rushing touchdowns ranked third in the NFL behind only Barry Sanders and Emmitt Smith (while leading the AFC), and he rushed for a career-high 666 yards as the Jets made the playoffs. His rushing numbers increased in 1992 as he recorded 696 yards and six touchdowns.

After the 1993 season, Baxter's rushing totals began to diminish as he was featured less and less in the offense. He missed the first week of minicamp in May 1996 due to an incident involving his off-season vocation as a truck driver transporting cattle between Enterprise, Alabama and Amarillo, Texas. During his final haul the day before reporting for the start of camp, he was forced off the road for twelve hours when United States Department of Transportation inspectors in Augusta, Georgia checked his logbook and discovered that he had been on the road too long without a break. He fell out of favor with head coach Rich Kotite and offensive coordinator Ron Erhardt, was replaced by Richie Anderson as the starting fullback and released by the Jets on August 25, 1996.

== NFL career statistics ==
Legend
| **Bold** | Career high |

=== Regular season ===
| Year | Team | Games | | Rushing | | | | | Receiving | | | | |
| Year | Team | GP | GS | Att | Yds | Avg | Lng | TD | Rec | Yds | Avg | Lng | TD |
|---|---|---|---|---|---|---|---|---|---|---|---|---|---|
| 1989 | NYJ | 1 | 0 | 0 | 0 | 0.0 | 0 | 0 | 0 | 0 | 0.0 | 0 | 0 |
| 1990 | NYJ | **16** | 10 | 124 | 539 | 4.3 | 28 | 6 | 8 | 73 | 9.1 | 22 | 0 |
| 1991 | NYJ | **16** | 14 | **184** | 666 | 3.6 | **31** | **11** | 12 | 124 | **10.3** | **34** | 0 |
| 1992 | NYJ | 15 | **15** | 152 | **698** | **4.6** | 30 | 6 | 4 | 32 | 8.0 | 12 | 0 |
| 1993 | NYJ | **16** | 13 | 174 | 559 | 3.2 | 16 | 7 | 20 | 158 | 7.9 | 24 | 0 |
| 1994 | NYJ | 15 | 9 | 60 | 170 | 2.8 | 13 | 4 | 10 | 40 | 4.0 | 7 | 0 |
| 1995 | NYJ | 15 | 13 | 85 | 296 | 3.5 | 26 | 1 | **26** | **160** | 6.2 | 20 | 0 |
| | | 94 | 74 | 779 | 2,928 | 3.8 | 31 | 35 | 80 | 587 | 7.3 | 34 | 0 |

=== Playoffs ===
| Year | Team | Games | | Rushing | | | | | Receiving | | | | |
| Year | Team | GP | GS | Att | Yds | Avg | Lng | TD | Rec | Yds | Avg | Lng | TD |
|---|---|---|---|---|---|---|---|---|---|---|---|---|---|
| 1991 | NYJ | 1 | 0 | 5 | 14 | 2.8 | 5 | 0 | 0 | 0 | 0.0 | 0 | 0 |
| | | 1 | 0 | 5 | 14 | 2.8 | 5 | 0 | 0 | 0 | 0.0 | 0 | 0 |
