= Jason Staurovsky =

American football player (born 1963)

No. 17, 4, 10
- Position: Placekicker

Personal information
- Born: March 23, 1963 (age 63); Tulsa, Oklahoma, U.S.
- Listed height: 5 ft 9 in (1.75 m)
- Listed weight: 167 lb (76 kg)

Career information
- High school: Bishop Kelley (Tulsa)
- College: Tulsa
- NFL draft: 1986: undrafted

Career history
- Buffalo Bills (1986)*; New Orleans Saints (1987)*; St. Louis Cardinals (1987); New England Patriots (1988–1991); New York Jets (1992)
- * Offseason or practice squad member only

Career NFL statistics
- Field goals made: 54
- Field goal attempts: 80
- Field goal %: 67.5
- Longest field goal: 53
- Stats at Pro Football Reference

Jason Charles Staurovsky (born March 23, 1963) is an American former professional football player who was a placekicker in the National Football League (NFL) from 1987 to 1992. He attended Bishop Kelley High School and played college football for the Tulsa Golden Hurricane, for whom he is the all-time leading scorer. He played for the St Louis Cardinals in 1987, the New England Patriots from 1988 to 1991, and the New York Jets in 1992. He currently resides in Tulsa, where he coaches youth athletics.
