= Anthony Morgan (American football) =

American football player (born 1967)

No. 81, 84
- Position: Wide receiver

Personal information
- Born: November 15, 1967 (age 58); Cleveland, Ohio, U.S.
- Listed height: 6 ft 1 in (1.85 m)
- Listed weight: 200 lb (91 kg)

Career information
- High school: John Adams (Cleveland)
- College: Tennessee
- NFL draft: 1991: 5th round, 134th overall pick

Career history
- Chicago Bears (1991–1993); Green Bay Packers (1993–1996)

Career NFL statistics
- Receptions: 87
- Receiving yards: 1,283
- Touchdowns: 12
- Stats at Pro Football Reference

Anthony Eugene Morgan (born November 15, 1967) is an American former professional football player who was a wide receiver in the National Football League (NFL). He played college football for the Tennessee Volunteers. Morgan played six seasons in the NFL for the Chicago Bears (1991–1993) and the Green Bay Packers (1993–1996).

== Professional career ==
Pre-draft measurables
Height	Weight	Arm length	Hand span	40-yard dash	10-yard split	20-yard split	20-yard shuttle	Vertical jump	Broad jump
6 ft 0 3/8 in (1.84 m)	195 lb (88 kg)	32 1/2 in (0.83 m)	9 1/8 in (0.23 m)	4.55 s	1.65 s	2.66 s	4.29 s	31.5 in (0.80 m)	9 ft 8 in (2.95 m)
All values from NFL Combine

He was selected by the Bears in the fifth round of the 1991 NFL draft. He is perhaps best known for his performance versus Detroit during the 1994 season, in which he hauled in 6 passes for 103 yards and two touchdowns

== Personal life ==
After his playing career ended, in September 1998, Morgan joined the Christian Valley Missionary Baptist Church and became an ordained minister in 2006. In July 2012, Morgan became the wide receivers coach at Trinity International University.
