= Carwell Gardner =

American football player (born 1966)

No. 35
- Position: Fullback

Personal information
- Born: November 27, 1966 (age 59); Louisville, Kentucky, U.S.
- Listed height: 6 ft 2 in (1.88 m)
- Listed weight: 232 lb (105 kg)

Career information
- High school: Trinity (Louisville, Kentucky)
- College: Kentucky; Louisville
- NFL draft: 1990: 2nd round, 42nd overall pick

Career history
- Buffalo Bills (1990–1995); Baltimore Ravens (1996); San Diego Chargers (1997)

Career NFL statistics
- Rushing yards: 749
- Rushing average: 3.5
- Receptions: 36
- Receiving yards: 281
- Touchdowns: 12
- Stats at Pro Football Reference

Carwell Ernest Gardner (born November 27, 1966) is an American former professional football player who was a fullback in the National Football League (NFL). He played eight seasons in the NFL—six for the Buffalo Bills (1990–1995), one for the Baltimore Ravens (1996), finally one for the San Diego Chargers (1997). He played college football for the Kentucky Wildcats and Louisville Cardinals. He was selected by the Bills in the second round of the 1990 NFL draft.

He was a 1989 Second Team All-South Independent. Gardner caught the first regular season pass in Baltimore Ravens history on September 1, 1996.

Gardner grew up with 3 brothers in Louisville, KY.
