= R. J. Kors =

American football player (born 1966)

No. 25, 30
- Position: Defensive back

Personal information
- Born: June 27, 1966 (age 60); Santa Monica, California, U.S.
- Listed height: 6 ft 0 in (1.83 m)
- Listed weight: 195 lb (88 kg)

Career information
- High school: El Camino Real (Los Angeles)
- College: USC; Long Beach State
- NFL draft: 1989: 12th round, 322nd overall pick

Career history
- Seattle Seahawks (1989)*; Seattle Seahawks (1990); New York Jets (1991–1992); Los Angeles Rams (1993)*; Cincinnati Bengals (1993); Los Angeles Raiders (1994)*; St. Louis Rams (1995)*
- * Offseason or practice squad member only
- Stats at Pro Football Reference

R. J. Kors (born June 27, 1966) is an American former professional football player who was a defensive back in the National Football League (NFL). He played college football for the USC Trojans and Long Beach State 49ers. He played in the NFL for the New York Jets from 1991 to 1992 and for the Cincinnati Bengals in 1993.
