= Dick Steinberg =

American football executive

Personal information
- Born: August 9, 1935; Philadelphia, Pennsylvania, U.S.
- Died: September 25, 1995 (aged 60); Long Beach, New York, U.S.

Career information
- High school: Philadelphia (PA) Central
- College: Temple

Career history

Coaching
- Vanderbilt (1964–1966) Assistant; Kansas State (1967–1969) Assistant; Southern Miss (1970–1971) Assistant

Operations
- New England Patriots (1972-1976) scout; Los Angeles Rams (1977–1979) Director of college scouting; New Orleans Saints (1980) Vice President of player personnel; New England Patriots (1981–1989) Director of player development; New York Jets (1990–1994) General manager
- Executive profile at Pro Football Reference

Dick Steinberg (August 9, 1935 – September 25, 1995) was an American football executive who served as the general manager of the New York Jets from 1990 to 1994.

== Career ==
=== Early career ===
Steinberg began his career as a coach at Roman Catholic High School before moving on to being a coach at Staunton Military Academy.

=== College football coaching ===
Steinberg was an assistant coach at Vanderbilt from 1964 to 1966. Starting in 1967 and for three seasons, Steinberg was an assistant coach at Kansas State. Steinberg's last college coaching job was when he was an assistant coach at Southern Miss.

=== National Football league personnel ===
In 1972, Steinberg became a scout for the New England Patriots which would last until after the 1976 season.

In 1977, the Los Angeles Rams hired Steinberg. During his tenure with the Rams he drafted a core group of players who would play a part in the Rams reaching Super Bowl XIV. During the 1980 season, Steinberg was the vice president of player personnel for the New Orleans Saints. In 1981, Steimberg returned to the Patriots and for nine seasons he was their director of player development. He helped build the Patriots team that would reach Super Bowl XX a few years later. In late 1989, after the Patriots reduced his role within the organization, Steinberg joined the New York Jets as their general manager, becoming the first such person in that role for the team since the 1970s. Steinberg's most notable move during his tenure with the Jets was trading for Cincinnati Bengals quarterback Boomer Esiason in 1993.

== Death ==
Steinberg died of stomach cancer on September 25, 1995, in Long Beach, New York at age 60.
