= Bobby Houston (American football) =

American football player (born 1967)

No. 60, 55, 57
- Position: Linebacker

Personal information
- Born: October 26, 1967 (age 59); Washington, D.C., U.S.
- Listed height: 6 ft 2 in (1.88 m)
- Listed weight: 242 lb (110 kg)

Career information
- High school: DeMatha Catholic (Hyattsville, Maryland)
- College: NC State
- NFL draft: 1990: 3rd round, 75th overall pick

Career history
- Green Bay Packers (1990); Atlanta Falcons (1990); New York Jets (1991–1996); Kansas City Chiefs (1997); San Diego Chargers (1997); Minnesota Vikings (1998)

Awards and highlights
- First-team All-ACC (1989)

Career NFL statistics
- Tackles: 327
- Sacks: 14.5
- Fumble recoveries: 8
- Stats at Pro Football Reference

Robert Darin Houston (born October 26, 1967) is an American former professional football player who was a linebacker in the National Football League (NFL).

Houston played college football at North Carolina State University. He was selected by the Green Bay Packers in the third round (75th overall pick) of the 1990 NFL draft. He played for the Packers (1990), the Falcons (1990), the New York Jets (1991–1996), the Kansas City Chiefs (1997), the San Diego Chargers (1997) and the Minnesota Vikings.
