= Mark Gunn =

American football player (born 1968)

No. 96, 98, 91
- Positions: Defensive tackle, defensive end

Personal information
- Born: July 24, 1968 (age 58); Cleveland, Ohio, U.S.
- Listed height: 6 ft 5 in (1.96 m)
- Listed weight: 288 lb (131 kg)

Career information
- High school: Glenville (OH)
- College: Pittsburgh
- NFL draft: 1991: 4th round, 94th overall pick

Career history
- New York Jets (1991–1994); New Orleans Saints (1994); Philadelphia Eagles (1995–1996); New York Jets (1996); Buffalo Bills (1997)*; Calgary Stampeders (1999); Tampa Bay Storm (2001)
- * Offseason or practice squad member only

Career NFL statistics
- Tackles: 87
- Sacks: 4.5
- Fumble recoveries: 1
- Stats at Pro Football Reference

Mark Pierre Gunn (born July 24, 1968) is an American former professional football player who was a defensive tackle in the National Football League (NFL) for the New York Jets (1991–1994, 1996), New Orleans Saints (1994) and Philadelphia Eagles (1995–1996) He played college football for the Pittsburgh Panthers and was selected 94th overall by the Jets in the fourth round of the 1991 NFL draft.
