= Dwayne White =

American football player (born 1967)

No. 67
- Positions: Guard, center

Personal information
- Born: February 10, 1967 (age 59); Philadelphia, Pennsylvania, U.S.
- Listed height: 6 ft 2 in (1.88 m)
- Listed weight: 315 lb (143 kg)

Career information
- High school: South Philadelphia (PA)
- College: Alcorn State
- NFL draft: 1990: 7th round, 167th overall pick

Career history

Playing
- New York Jets (1990–1994); St. Louis Rams (1995–1996)

Operations
- Alcorn State (2012–2014) (AD)

Career NFL statistics
- Games played: 105
- Games started: 99
- Fumble recoveries: 4
- Stats at Pro Football Reference

Dwayne Allen White (born February 10, 1967) is an American former professional football player who played in seven National Football League (NFL) seasons from 1990 to 1996 for the New York Jets and St. Louis Rams. He was selected 167th overall by the Jets in the seventh round of the 1990 NFL draft. He was the primary run-blocker for the Jets' short-yardage "Road Grader" formation. He played college football at Alcorn State University. He served as Alcorn's athletic director from 2012 to 2014.
