= Steve Gutman =

American football executive (born 1935)

Personal information
- Born: January 24, 1935 (age 91); The Bronx, New York, U.S.

Career history
- New York Jets (1988–2001) President

Steve Gutman (born January 24, 1935) is an American former professional football executive who served as the president of the New York Jets from 1988 to 2001.
