= 1986 Chicago Bears season =

NFL team season

- Owner: The McCaskey Family
- General manager: Jerry Vainisi
- Head coach: Mike Ditka
- Offensive coordinator: Ed Hughes
- Defensive coordinator: Vince Tobin
- Home stadium: Soldier Field

Results
- Record: 14–2
- Division place: 1st NFC Central
- Playoffs: Lost Divisional Playoffs (vs. Redskins) 13–27
- All-Pros: 11: WR Dennis Gentry; RB Walter Payton; RB Neal Anderson; LT Jimbo Covert; C Jay Hilgenberg; DE Dan Hampton; DT Steve McMichael; LB Wilber Marshall; MLB Mike Singletary; CB Mike Richardson; SS Dave Duerson
- Pro Bowlers: 7: RB Walter Payton; LT Jimbo Covert; C Jay Hilgenberg; DT Steve McMichael; LB Wilber Marshall; MLB Mike Singletary; SS Dave Duerson

The 1986 Chicago Bears season was their 67th regular season and 17th post-season completed in the National Football League. The Bears entered the season looking to repeat as Super Bowl champions, as they had won in 1985. Chicago managed to finish 14–2, one game off of their 1985 record of 15–1. Although the Bears had an equal 14–2 record as the New York Giants for the league's best record, the Giants were seeded number one in the NFC for the playoffs due to the Giants having a better conference record (11–1) than that of the Bears (10–2). In going 14–2, the Chicago Bears were the first team in NFL history to have consecutive seasons with 14 or more victories.

After winning the championship in 1985, the Bears seemed like a dynasty in the making. However, quarterback Jim McMahon showed up to training camp 25 pounds overweight – the product of the post-Super Bowl partying he'd partaken in. Nonetheless, he was once again named as the starter. Injuries to his rotator cuff (including a flagrant late-hit by Charles Martin which exacerbated it), however, derailed his season. McMahon played in only six of the team's first 12 games.

Aided by a strong offensive line, the Bears were once again led on offense by Walter Payton. Payton remained his usual stellar self, posting his 10th and final 1,000-yard season. With McMahon's poor play, as well as the equally poor play of backups Mike Tomczak, Steve Fuller and Doug Flutie, Payton was the sole spark on offense, which ranked 13th in the NFL.

As had been the case the year before, the Bears were once again led by their explosive defense. Any shortcomings on the offensive side of the ball were more than made up for on the defensive side. They once again were ranked 1st in the NFL. The Bears' defense became the third defense in the history of the NFL to lead the league in fewest points allowed and fewest total yards allowed for two consecutive seasons. The Bears' 187 points allowed is the fewest surrendered by any team in the 1980s (other than the strike-shortened 1982 season) – even fewer than the 198 points the Bears allowed in their historic 1985 season. The 187 points allowed set the all-time NFL record for fewest points allowed in a 16-game regular season at the time, which would not be broken until the 2000 Baltimore Ravens allowed a mere 165 points 14 years later.

However, the Bears were not able to recapture their magic from the season before and were bounced from the playoffs in their first game by the Washington Redskins.

== Offseason ==
=== 1986 NFL draft ===
1986 Chicago Bears draft
Round	Pick	Player	Position	College	Notes
1	27	Neal Anderson *	Running back	Florida	
2	55	Vestee Jackson	Cornerback	Washington	
3	82	David Williams	Wide receiver	Illinois	
4	110	Paul Blair	Offensive tackle	Oklahoma State	
5	138	Lew Barnes	Wide receiver	Oregon	
6	166	Jeff Powell	Running back	Tennessee	
7	194	Bruce Jones	Defensive back	North Alabama	
8	221	Maurice Douglass	Safety	Kentucky	
9	249	John Teltschik	Punter	Texas	
10	277	Barton Hundley	Defensive back	Kansas State	
11	305	Glen Kozlowski	Wide receiver	Brigham Young	
Made roster † Pro Football Hall of Fame * Made at least one Pro Bowl during career

== Personnel ==
=== Coaches / Staff ===
Coaching Staff of 1986 season
Front office: Virginia Halas McCaskey – Owner; Michael McCaskey – Team president; Jerry Vainisi – General manager; Ray Earley – Equipment manager; Gary Haeger – Assistant equipment manager; Rod Graves – Director of player personnel; Coaches: Mike Ditka – Head coach; Steve Kazor – Assistant head coach; Ed Hughes – Offensive coordinator; Vince Tobin – Defensive coordinator	Position coaches: Greg Landry – Quarterbacks; Johnny Roland – Running backs; Dick Stanfel – Offensive line; John Levra – Defensive line; Dave McGinnis – Linebackers; Jim LaRue – Secondary; Trainers: Brian McCaskey – Assistant trainer; Clyde Emrich – Weightlifting/Strength	Scouts: Jim Dooley; Pete McGrane – Video team

=== Roster ===
1986 Chicago Bears roster
Quarterbacks (QB): 2 Doug Flutie; 4 Steve Fuller; 18 Mike Tomczak; Running backs (RB): 35 Neal Anderson; 34 Walter Payton; 20 Thomas Sanders; 26 Matt Suhey; 33 Calvin Thomas; Wide receivers (WR): 81 Lew Barnes; 83 Willie Gault; 29 Dennis Gentry; 89 Keith Ortego; Tight ends (TE): 87 Emery Moorehead; 80 Tim Wrightman	Offensive linemen (OL): 79 Kurt Becker G; 68 Paul Blair T; 62 Mark Bortz G; 74 Jim Covert T; 63 Jay Hilgenberg C; 75 Stefan Humphries G; 57 Tom Thayer G; 78 Keith Van Horne T; Defensive linemen (DL): 95 Richard Dent DE; 99 Dan Hampton DE; 73 Mike Hartenstine DE; 76 Steve McMichael DT; 72 William Perry DT; 70 Henry Waechter DT	Linebackers (LB): 90 Al Harris OLB; 58 Wilber Marshall WLB; 51 Jim Morrissey OLB; 59 Ron Rivera MLB; 50 Mike Singletary MLB; 55 Otis Wilson SLB; Defensive backs (DB): 25 Todd Bell SS; 36 Maurice Douglass CB/S; 22 Dave Duerson SS; 45 Gary Fencik FS; 23 Shaun Gayle CB/S; 24 Vestee Jackson CB; 48 Reggie Phillips CB; 27 Mike Richardson CB; Special teams (ST): 8 Maury Buford P; 6 Kevin Butler K; 52 Larry Rubens LS	Reserve: 54 Brian Cabral LB (IR); 21 Leslie Frazier CB (PUP); 71 Andy Frederick T (IR); 93 Glen Kozlowski WR (IR); -- Mitch Krenk TE (PUP); 85 Dennis McKinnon WR (PUP); 9 Jim McMahon QB (IR); 53 Dan Rains LB (IR); 49 Riley Walton TE (IR); Rookies in italics

=== Preseason ===
Game	Date	Opponent	Result	Record	Venue
1	August 3	Dallas Cowboys	W 17–6	1–0	(United Kingdom) Wembley Stadium (London)
2	August 9	Pittsburgh Steelers	W 33–13	2–0	Three Rivers Stadium
3	August 16	Indianapolis Colts	W 38–21	3–0	Soldier Field
4	August 23	St. Louis Cardinals	L 7–14	3–1	Soldier Field
5	August 30	Buffalo Bills	W 31–17	4–1	Notre Dame Stadium

== Regular season ==
=== Schedule ===
Week	Date	Opponent	Result	Record	Venue	Attendance
1	September 7	Cleveland Browns	W 41–31	1–0	Soldier Field	66,030
2	September 14	Philadelphia Eagles	W 13–10 (OT)	2–0	Soldier Field	65,130
3	September 22	at Green Bay Packers	W 25–12	3–0	Lambeau Field	55,527
4	September 28	at Cincinnati Bengals	W 44–7	4–0	Riverfront Stadium	55,146
5	October 5	Minnesota Vikings	W 23–0	5–0	Soldier Field	63,921
6	October 12	at Houston Oilers	W 20–7	6–0	Astrodome	46,026
7	October 19	at Minnesota Vikings	L 7–23	6–1	Hubert H. Humphrey Metrodome	62,851
8	October 26	Detroit Lions	W 13–7	7–1	Soldier Field	62,064
9	November 3	Los Angeles Rams	L 17–20	7–2	Soldier Field	64,877
10	November 9	at Tampa Bay Buccaneers	W 23–3	8–2	Tampa Stadium	70,097
11	November 16	at Atlanta Falcons	W 13–10	9–2	Atlanta–Fulton County Stadium	55,520
12	November 23	Green Bay Packers	W 12–10	10–2	Soldier Field	59,291
13	November 30	Pittsburgh Steelers	W 13–10 (OT)	11–2	Soldier Field	61,425
14	December 7	Tampa Bay Buccaneers	W 48–14	12–2	Soldier Field	52,746
15	December 15	at Detroit Lions	W 16–13	13–2	Pontiac Silverdome	75,602
16	December 21	at Dallas Cowboys	W 24–10	14–2	Texas Stadium	57,256

== Game summaries ==
=== Week 1: vs. Cleveland Browns ===
Team	1	2	3	4	Total
Browns	7	7	7	10	31
• Bears	21	3	7	10	41

- Date: Sunday, September 7
- Location: Soldier Field, Chicago
- Game start: 1:00 p.m.
- Game attendance: 66,030
- Game weather: 63 °F or 17.2 °C (Sunny); wind 9 miles per hour (14 km/h; 7.8 kn)
- Referee: Ben Dreith
- TV announcers (NBC): Dick Enberg and Merlin Olsen

Scoring summary
Q1	CLE	Gross recovered fumble in end zone (Bahr kick)	CLE 7–0
Q1	CHI	Gentry 91 yard kickoff return (Butler kick)	Tie 7–7
Q1	CHI	Payton 2 yard run (Butler kick)	CHI 14–7
Q1	CHI	Marshall 58 yard interception return (Butler kick)	CHI 21–7
Q2	CLE	Mack 3 yard run (Bahr kick)	CHI 21–14
Q2	CHI	Butler 47 yard field goal	CHI 24–14
Q3	CLE	Mack 14 yard run (Bahr kick)	CHI 24–21
Q3	CHI	Payton 11 yard pass from McMahon (Butler kick)	CHI 31–21
Q4	CLE	Bahr 22 yard field goal	CHI 31–24
Q4	CHI	Butler 19 yard field goal	CHI 34–24
Q4	CLE	Brennan 15 yard pass from Kosar (Bahr kick)	CHI 34–31
Q4	CHI	Suhey 6 yard run (Butler kick)	CHI 41–31

=== Week 2: vs. Philadelphia Eagles ===
Philadelphia Eagles at Chicago Bears

Team	1	2	3	4	OT	Total
Eagles	3	0	0	7	0	10
• Bears	0	0	10	0	3	13

- Date: Sunday, September 14
- Location: Soldier Field, Chicago
- Game start: 12:00 p.m. CST
- Game attendance: 65,130
- Game weather: 66 °F or 18.9 °C (Cloudy), wind 12 miles per hour (19 km/h; 10 kn)
- Referee: Dick Jorgensen
- TV announcers (CBS): Dick Stockton Dan Dierdorf
- Source: Pro-Football-Reference.com

Scoring summary
1	Eagles	Paul McFadden 49-yard field goal	Eagles 3–0
3	Bears	Walter Payton 1-yard run (Kevin Butler kick)	Bears 7–3
3	Bears	Kevin Butler 23-yard field goal	Bears 10–3
4	Eagles	Mike Quick 26-yard pass from Ron Jaworski (Paul McFadden kick)	Tie 10–10
OT	Bears	Kevin Butler 23-yard field goal	Bears 13–10

=== Week 12: vs. Green Bay Packers ===
Green Bay Packers at Chicago Bears

Team	1	2	3	4	Total
Packers	0	0	3	7	10
• Bears	2	7	0	3	12

- Date: Sunday, November 23
- Location: Soldier Field, Chicago
- Game start: 12:00 p.m. CST
- Game weather: 41 °F (5 °C), wind 13 miles per hour (21 km/h; 11 kn)
- Referee: Jerry Markbreit
- TV announcers (CBS): Tim Ryan & Johnny Morris
- Source: Pro-Football-Reference.com

Scoring summary
1	Bears	Safety, Kenneth Davis tackled by Dan Hampton in end zone	Bears 2–0
2	Bears	Dennis Gentry recovered fumble in end zone (Kevin Butler kick)	Bears 9–0
3	Packers	Al Del Greco 22-yard field goal	Bears 9–3
4	Packers	Ed West 46-yard pass from Randy Wright (Al Del Greco kick)	Packers 10–9
4	Bears	Kevin Butler 32-yard field goal	Bears 12–10

=== Week 15: at Detroit Lions ===
Chicago Bears at Detroit Lions

Team	1	2	3	4	Total
• Bears	0	3	0	13	16
Lions	3	3	7	0	13

- Date: Monday, December 15
- Location: Pontiac Silverdome, Detroit, Michigan
- Game start: 8:00 p.m. CST
- Game weather: Indoors (dome)
- Referee: Pat Haggerty
- Television network: ABC
- Source: Pro-Football-Reference.com

Scoring summary
1	Lions	Eddie Murray 52-yard field goal	Lions 3–0
2	Bears	Kevin Butler 41-yard field goal	Tie 3–3
2	Lions	Eddie Murray 39-yard field goal	Lions 6–3
3	Lions	Leonard Thompson 4-yard pass from Chuck Long (Eddie Murray kick)	Lions 13–3
4	Bears	Kevin Butler 32-yard field goal	Lions 13–6
4	Bears	Matt Suhey 4-yard run (Kevin Butler kick)	Tie 13–13
4	Bears	Kevin Butler 22-yard field goal	Bears 16–13

=== Week 16: at Dallas Cowboys ===
Chicago Bears at Dallas Cowboys

Team	1	2	3	4	Total
• Bears	7	14	3	0	24
Cowboys	0	0	0	10	10

- Date: Sunday, December 21
- Location: Texas Stadium, Irving, Texas
- Game start: 3:00 p.m. CST
- Game weather: 47 °F (8.3 °C), wind 8 miles per hour (13 km/h; 7.0 kn)
- Referee: Fred Wyant
- TV announcers (CBS): Pat Summerall and John Madden
- Source: Pro-Football-Reference.com

Scoring summary
1	Bears	Walter Payton 1-yard run (Kevin Butler kick)	Bears 7–0
2	Bears	Neal Anderson 58-yard pass from Doug Flutie (Kevin Butler kick)	Bears 14–0
2	Bears	Willie Gault 33-yard pass from Doug Flutie (Kevin Butler kick)	Bears 21–0
3	Bears	Kevin Butler 31-yard field goal	Bears 24–0
4	Cowboys	Rafael Septién 50-yard field goal	Bears 24–3
4	Cowboys	Mike Renfro 11-yard pass from Steve Pelluer (Rafael Septien kick)	Bears 24–10

== Playoffs ==
Round	Date	Opponent	Result	Record	Venue	Attendance
Divisional	January 3, 1987	Washington Redskins (4)	L 13–27	0–1	Soldier Field	65,141

=== Game summary ===
NFC Divisional Playoff: Washington Redskins at Chicago Bears – Game summary

Quarter	1	2	3	4	Total
Redskins	7	0	7	13	27
Bears	0	13	0	0	13

at Soldier Field, Chicago

- Date: January 3, 1987
- Game time: 4:00 p.m. EDT
- Game weather: 33 °F (0.6 °C), wind 7 miles per hour (11 km/h; 6.1 kn)
- Referee: Bob McElwee
- Boxscore

Game information

First quarter

- WAS – Art Monk 28 yard pass from Jay Schroeder (Jess Atkinson kick) Redskins 7-0

Second quarter

- CHI – Willie Gault 50 yard pass from Doug Flutie (Kevin Butler kick) Tie 7-7
- CHI – Kevin Butler 23 yard field goal. Bears 10-7
- CHI – Kevin Butler 41 yard field goal. Bears 13-7

Third quarter

- WAS – Art Monk 23 yard pass from Jay Schroeder (Jess Atkinson kick) Redskins 14-13

Fourth quarter

- WAS – George Rogers 1 yard run (Jess Atkinson kick) Redskins 21-13
- WAS – Jessie Atkinson 35 yard field goal. Redskins 24-13
- WAS – Jessie Atkinson 25 yard field goal. Redskins 27-13

Redskins

- Jay Schroeder. 15–32, 185 yards, 2 TD, 1 Int
- Art Monk. 5 rec, 81 yards, 2 TD

Bears

- Doug Flutie. 11–31, 134 yards, 1 TD, 2 Int
- Walter Payton. 14 rush, 38 yards.

Turnovers:

- Redskins – 1
- Bears – 4

The 1986 Bears earned a first round playoff bye, but in their opening playoff game, they were upset at home by the Washington Redskins. A holding penalty and a missed field goal by Kevin Butler frustrated the Bears in the first quarter. They still, however, managed to take a 13–7 lead into halftime. But their usually stout defense fell apart in the second half, allowing the Redskins to score 20 unanswered points.

"Maybe my dreams didn't come true", said Chicago Coach Mike Ditka. "The defense has to play outstanding and today they were just not up to the way the Redskins were playing."

Despite injuries to Redskins offensive linemen Joe Jacoby and Russ Grimm, the Washington offensive line was able to pick up the Bears patented blitzes. Washington quarterback Jay Schroeder was sacked only twice. He was also able to use the blitzes to his advantage, completing passes while being chased out of the pocket.

Trailing 14–13 in the 4th quarter, the Bears' good fortune ran out, when the usually dependable Payton lost a fumble, which led to an 83-yard touchdown drive by the Redskins. The long drive perpetrated against the NFL's best defense seemed to take the wind out of the Bears' sails. A few minutes later, the Bears muffed a punt return which set up an easy field goal for the Redskins. The Bears lost 27–13.

== Standings ==
NFC Central
	W	L	T	PCT	DIV	CONF	PF	PA	STK
Chicago Bears^{(2)}	14	2	0	.875	7–1	10–2	352	187	W7
Minnesota Vikings	9	7	0	.563	6–2	8–4	398	273	W1
Detroit Lions	5	11	0	.313	3–5	4–8	277	326	L4
Green Bay Packers	4	12	0	.250	3–5	3–9	254	418	L1
Tampa Bay Buccaneers	2	14	0	.125	1–7	1–13	239	473	L7
