= 1984 Chicago Bears season =

NFL team season

- Owner: The McCaskey Family
- General manager: Jerry Vainisi
- Head coach: Mike Ditka
- Offensive coordinator: Ed Hughes
- Defensive coordinator: Buddy Ryan
- Home stadium: Soldier Field

Results
- Record: 10–6
- Division place: 1st NFC Central
- Playoffs: Won Divisional Playoffs (at Redskins) 23–19; Lost NFC Championship (at 49ers) 0–23
- All-Pros: 7: RB Walter Payton; DT Dan Hampton; DE Richard Dent; LB Otis Wilson; MLB Mike Singletary; SS Todd Bell; FS Gary Fencik
- Pro Bowlers: 5: RB Walter Payton; DT Dan Hampton; DE Richard Dent; MLB Mike Singletary; SS Todd Bell

The 1984 season was the Chicago Bears' 65th in the National Football League and their third under head coach Mike Ditka. The team improved from their 8–8 record from 1983, to a 10–6 record, earning them a spot in the NFL playoffs for the first time since 1979.

This was the first of five consecutive NFC Central titles for the Bears. They opened their 1984 training camp in a new location, Platteville, Wisconsin as head coach Mike Ditka needed his team to get away from any distractions they might face at home. The team was on the verge of discovering a group of young leaders for the first time, and began to show the dominating defense that would emerge in full the following season, and pushed much farther than anyone expected them to go.

Highlights of the season included a Week 2 shutout of the Denver Broncos 27–0 behind a huge day from star running back Walter Payton, a Week 3 victory against Green Bay, the first game between Ditka and Packers head coach Forrest Gregg, and a 17–6 victory against the defending Super Bowl champion Los Angeles Raiders. The Week 2 game against Denver featured a famous image from Payton's career: a 50+ yard run down the sideline, led by 2nd-year guard Mark Bortz, an 8th-round draft pick that was converted from defensive tackle. Payton reached a major milestone as he surpassed Jim Brown as the game's all-time leading rusher in yards in the third quarter of a Week Six home game against the New Orleans Saints. The Bears beat the Saints 20–7. The 1984 Bears ran for the second-most rushing attempts in a season, with 674.

In the Divisional Round of the playoffs, the Bears defeated the Washington Redskins 23–19 for their first playoff victory in the Super Bowl era as well as their first since their victory over the New York Giants in the 1963 NFL Championship Game. However, the Bears' season ended in the NFC Championship Game 23–0 to the eventual Super Bowl XIX champions, the San Francisco 49ers.

== Offseason ==
=== 1984 NFL draft ===
1984 Chicago Bears draft
Round	Pick	Player	Position	College	Notes
1	11	Wilber Marshall *	Linebacker	Florida	
2	44	Ron Rivera	Linebacker	California	
3	71	Stefan Humphries	Guard	Michigan	
4	98	Tom Andrews	Guard	Louisville	
7	179	Nakita Robertson	Running back	Central Arkansas	
8	212	Brad Anderson	Wide receiver	Arizona	
9	244	Mark Casale	Quarterback	Montclair State	
10	266	Kurt Vestman	Tight end	Idaho	
10	271	Shaun Gayle *	Safety	Ohio State	
11	298	Mark Butkus	Defensive tackle	Illinois	
12	330	Donald Jordan	Running back	Houston	
Made roster † Pro Football Hall of Fame * Made at least one Pro Bowl during career

=== Undrafted free agents ===
1984 undrafted free agents of note
Player	Position	College
Mike Bass	Kicker	Illinois
Chris Jensen	Wide receiver	Lake Forest

== Personnel ==
=== Coaches / Staff ===
1984 Chicago Bears staff
Front office: Owner – Virginia Halas McCaskey; Team president – Michael McCaskey; General manager – Jerry Vainisi; Director of player personnel – Rod Graves; Equipment manager – Ray Earley; Assistant equipment manager – Gary Haeger; Scout – Jim Dooley; Video team – Pete McGrane; Head coaches: Head coach – Mike Ditka; Assistant head coach – Steve Kazor; Offensive coaches: Offensive coordinator – Ed Hughes; Offensive specialist – Ted Plumb; Running backs – Johnny Roland; Offensive line – Dick Stanfel	Defensive coaches: Defensive coordinator – Buddy Ryan; Defensive line – Dale Haupt; Secondary – Jim LaRue; Strength and conditioning: Assistant trainer – Brian McCaskey; Weightlifting/Strength – Clyde Emrich

=== Roster ===
1984 Chicago Bears roster
Quarterbacks (QB): 4 Steve Fuller; 11 Greg Landry; 12 Rusty Lisch; Running backs (RB): 29 Dennis Gentry; 32 Anthony Hutchison; 34 Walter Payton; 26 Matt Suhey; 33 Calvin Thomas; Wide receivers (WR): 86 Brad Anderson; 84 Brian Baschnagel; 30 Jack Cameron; 83 Willie Gault; 85 Dennis McKinnon; Tight ends (TE): 88 Pat Dunsmore; 89 Mitch Krenk; 87 Emery Moorehead; 81 Jay Saldi	Offensive linemen (OL): 60 Tom Andrews C; 79 Kurt Becker G; 62 Mark Bortz G; 74 Jim Covert T; 64 Rob Fada G; 71 Andy Frederick T; 63 Jay Hilgenberg C; 78 Keith Van Horne T; Defensive linemen (DL): 95 Richard Dent DE; 99 Dan Hampton DT; 73 Mike Hartenstine DE; 98 Tyrone Keys DE; 76 Steve McMichael DT; 68 Jim Osborne DT; 70 Henry Waechter DE	Linebackers (LB): 54 Brian Cabral MLB; 90 Al Harris OLB; 58 Wilber Marshall OLB; 53 Dan Rains OLB; 59 Ron Rivera OLB; 50 Mike Singletary MLB; 55 Otis Wilson OLB; Defensive backs (DB): 25 Todd Bell SS; 22 Dave Duerson FS; 45 Gary Fencik FS; 24 Jeff Fisher CB; 21 Leslie Frazier CB; 20 Kevin Potter SS; 27 Mike Richardson CB; 44 Terry Schmidt CB; Special teams (ST): 15 Dave Finzer P; 16 Bob Thomas K	Reserve: 97 Mark Butkus DT (IR); 23 Shaun Gayle CB (IR); 75 Stefan Humphries G (IR); 49 Donald Jordan RB (IR); 82 Ken Margerum WR (IR); 9 Jim McMahon QB (IR); 48 Raymond Morris LB (IR); 67 Tim Norman G (IR); 93 Kurt Vestman TE (IR); 80 Rickey Watts WR (IR); Rookies in italics

== Preseason ==
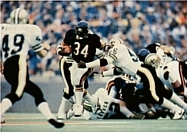
Walter Payton (34), pictured breaking the NFL's career rushing record

Week	Date	Opponent	Result	Record	Venue
1	August 4	St. Louis Cardinals	L 10–19	0–1	Soldier Field
2	August 11	Green Bay Packers	L 10–17	0–2	Milwaukee County Stadium
3	August 18	Cincinnati Bengals	L 17–25	0–3	Soldier Field
4	August 26	Buffalo Bills	W 38–7	1–3	Hoosier Dome

== Regular season ==
=== Schedule ===
Week	Date	Opponent	Result	Record	Venue	Attendance
1	September 2	Tampa Bay Buccaneers	W 34–14	1–0	Soldier Field	58,789
2	September 9	Denver Broncos	W 27–0	2–0	Soldier Field	54,335
3	September 16	at Green Bay Packers	W 9–7	3–0	Lambeau Field	55,942
4	September 23	at Seattle Seahawks	L 9–38	3–1	Kingdome	61,520
5	September 30	Dallas Cowboys	L 14–23	3–2	Soldier Field	63,623
6	October 7	New Orleans Saints	W 20–7	4–2	Soldier Field	53,752
7	October 14	at St. Louis Cardinals	L 21–38	4–3	Busch Memorial Stadium	49,554
8	October 21	at Tampa Bay Buccaneers	W 44–9	5–3	Tampa Stadium	60,003
9	October 28	Minnesota Vikings	W 16–7	6–3	Soldier Field	57,517
10	November 4	Los Angeles Raiders	W 17–6	7–3	Soldier Field	59,858
11	November 11	at Los Angeles Rams	L 13–29	7–4	Anaheim Stadium	62,021
12	November 18	Detroit Lions	W 16–14	8–4	Soldier Field	54,911
13	November 25	at Minnesota Vikings	W 34–3	9–4	Hubert H. Humphrey Metrodome	56,881
14	December 3	at San Diego Chargers	L 7–20	9–5	Jack Murphy Stadium	45,470
15	December 9	Green Bay Packers	L 14–20	9–6	Soldier Field	59,374
16	December 16	at Detroit Lions	W 30–13	10–6	Pontiac Silverdome	53,252

=== Standings ===
NFC Central
	W	L	T	PCT	DIV	CONF	PF	PA	STK
^{(3)} Chicago Bears	10	6	0	.625	7–1	8–4	325	248	W1
Green Bay Packers	8	8	0	.500	5–3	8–4	390	309	W3
Tampa Bay Buccaneers	6	10	0	.375	3–5	5–9	335	380	W2
Detroit Lions	4	11	1	.281	3–5	4–7–1	283	408	L3
Minnesota Vikings	3	13	0	.188	2–6	3–9	276	484	L6

=== Game summaries ===
==== Week 2: vs. Denver Broncos ====
The Bears limited the Broncos to 130 total yards as three different Denver quarterbacks (John Elway, Gary Kubiak, and Scott Stankavage) completed just nine passes with two interceptions. Seven different Bears players led by Walter Payton rushed for 302 yards.

==== Week 3: at Green Bay Packers ====
Quarter	1	2	3	4	Total
Bears	3	3	0	3	9
Packers	0	7	0	0	7

at Lambeau Field, Green Bay, Wisconsin

- Date: Sunday, September 16
- Game time: 12:00 p.m.
- Game weather: 50 °F (10 °C), wind 9 mph (14 km/h)
- Referee: Pat Haggerty
- TV announcers (CBS): Pat Summerall and John Madden
- Pro-Football-Reference.com

Game information

First quarter

- CHI – Bob Thomas 19-yard field goal. Bears 3–0.

Second quarter

- CHI – Bob Thomas 49-yard field goal. Bears 6–0.
- GB – Jessie Clark 1-yard run (Eddie Garcia kick). Packers 7–6.

Fourth quarter

- CHI – Bob Thomas 28-yard field goal. Bears 9–7.

Bears

- Bob Avellini
  11/17, 133 yards, INT
- Walter Payton
  27 rushes, 110 yards
- Emery Moorehead
  2 receptions, 65 yards

Packers

- Lynn Dickey
  11/23, 142 yards, INT
- Gerry Ellis
  7 rushes, 18 yards
- James Lofton
  4 receptions, 89 yards

==== Week 4: at Seattle Seahawks ====
Quarter	1	2	3	4	Total
Bears	7	0	0	2	9
Seahawks	7	3	21	7	38

at Kingdome, Seattle, Washington

- Date: Sunday, September 23
- Game time: 1:00 pm. PDT
- Game weather: indoors (dome)
- Game attendance: 61,250
- Referee: Chuck Heberling
- TV announcers (CBS): Tim Ryan & Johnny Morris
- Pro-Football-Reference.com

Game information

First quarter

- CHI – Matt Suhey 3-yard pass from Walter Payton (Bob Thomas kick). Bears 7–0.
- SEA – Keith Simpson 39-yard interception return (Norm Johnson kick). Tied 7–7.

Second quarter

- SEA – Norm Johnson 27-yard field goal. Seahawks 10–7.

Third quarter

- SEA – Dave Krieg 3-yard run (Norm Johnson kick). Seahawks 17–7.
- SEA – Eric Lane 55-yard pass from Dave Krieg (Norm Johnson kick). Seahawks 24–7.
- SEA – Joe Nash recovered fumble in end zone (Norm Johnson kick). Seahawks 31–7.

Fourth quarter

- CHI – Safety, holding penalty by Seattle in end zone. Seahawks 31–9.
- SEA – Terry Jackson 62-yard interception return (Norm Johnson kick). Seahawks 38–9.

Bears

- Bob Avellini
  13/26, 119 yards, INT
- Walter Payton
  24 rushes, 116 yards
- Willie Gault
  6 receptions, 73 yards

Seahawks

- Dave Krieg
  6/16, 146 yards, TD
- Eric Lane
  17 rushes, 50 yards
  1 reception, 55 yards, TD

Six Bears turnovers and a 21–0 run by the Seahawks in the 3rd quarter were the key as Chicago's season-opening win streak was blunted, 38–9. The two teams combined for just 504 yards of offense with 22 penalties eating up 181 yards.

==== Week 5: vs. Dallas Cowboys ====
Quarter	1	2	3	4	Total
Cowboys	10	7	3	3	23
Bears	7	7	0	0	14

at Soldier Field, Chicago

- Date: Sunday, September 30
- Game time: 12:00 p.m.
- Game weather: 44 °F (7 °C), wind 7 mph (11 km/h)
- Referee: Fred Wyant
- TV announcers (CBS): Pat Summerall and John Madden
- Pro-Football-Reference.com

Game information

First quarter

- DAL – Rafael Septién 44-yard field goal. Cowboys 3–0.
- CHI – Jim McMahon 16-yard run (Bob Thomas kick). Bears 7–3.
- DAL – Tony Dorsett 68-yard pass from Gary Hogeboom (Rafael Septien kick). Cowboys 10–7.

Second quarter

- CHI – Walter Payton 20-yard run (Bob Thomas kick). Bears 14–10.
- DAL – Timmy Newsome 2-yard run (Rafael Septien kick). Cowboys 17–14.

Third quarter

- DAL – Rafael Septien 32-yard field goal. Cowboys 20–14.

Fourth quarter

- DAL – Rafael Septien 23-yard field goal. Cowboys 23–14.

Cowboys

- Gary Hogeboom
  18/29, 265 yards, TD
- Tony Dorsett
  18 rushes, 51 yards
  4 receptions, 80 yards, TD

Bears

- Jim McMahon
  6/14, 79 yards
- Walter Payton
  25 rushes, 155 yards, TD
- Dennis McKinnon
  4 receptions, 53 yards

Mike Ditka for the first time as Bears head coach faced Tom Landry, who'd coached Ditka in Super Bowl VI. Landry's Cowboys were outgained in yardage 400 to 313 but forced two Bears turnovers to win 23–14. The Bears rushing attack still managed 283 yards.

==== Week 6: vs. New Orleans Saints ====
Quarter	1	2	3	4	Total
Saints	0	7	0	0	7
Bears	6	7	0	7	20

at Soldier Field, Chicago

- Date: Sunday, October 7
- Game time: 12:00 p.m.
- Game weather: 62 °F (17 °C), wind 11 mph (18 km/h)
- Game attendance: 53,752
- Referee: Bob McElwee
- TV announcers (CBS): Tim Ryan and Johnny Morris
- Pro-Football-Reference.com

Game information

First quarter

- CHI – Bob Thomas 48-yard field goal. Bears 3–0.
- CHI – Bob Thomas 46-yard field goal. Bears 6–0.

Second quarter

- NOR – Wayne Wilson 15-yard pass from Richard Todd (Morten Andersen kick). Saints 7–6.
- CHI – Walter Payton 1-yard run (Bob Thomas kick). Bears 13–7.

Fourth quarter

- CHI – Dennis McKinnon 16-yard pass from Jim McMahon (Bob Thomas kick). Bears 20–7.

Saints

- Richard Todd
  7/26, 158 yards, TD
- George Rogers
  16 rushes, 99 yards
- Tyrone Young
  2 receptions, 93 yards

Bears

- Jim McMahon
  10/14, 128 yards, TD
- Walter Payton
  32 rushes, 154 yards, TD
- Matt Suhey
  3 receptions, 45 yards

Walter Payton ran for 154 yards and a touchdown on his way to breaking Jim Brown's career rushing yardage and 100-yard games records.

==== Week 9: vs. Minnesota Vikings ====
Quarter	1	2	3	4	Total
Vikings	0	0	0	7	7
Bears	6	10	0	0	16

at Soldier Field, Chicago, Illinois

- Date: Sunday, October 28
- Game time: 12:00 p.m.
- Game weather: 55 °F (13 °C), wind 12 mph (19 km/h)
- Referee: Tom Dooley
- TV announcers (CBS): Tim Ryan and Johnny Morris
- Pro-Football-Reference.com

Game information

First quarter

- CHI – Matt Suhey 2-yard run (Bob Thomas missed extra point). Bears 6–0.

Second quarter

- CHI – Dennis McKinnon 18-yard pass from Jim McMahon (Bob Thomas kick). Bears 13–0.
- CHI – Bob Thomas 19-yard field goal. Bears 16–0.

Fourth quarter

- MIN – Leo Lewis 22-yard pass from Wade Wilson (Jan Stenerud kick). Bears 16–7.

Vikings

- Archie Manning
  14/24, 138 yards, 1 INT
- Archie Manning
  4 rushes, 20 yards
- Leo Lewis
  3 receptions, 71 yards, 1 TD

Bears

- Jim McMahon
  16/26, 180 yards, 1 TD
- Walter Payton
  22 rushes, 54 yards
- Emery Moorehead
  3 receptions, 64 yards

==== Week 10: vs. Los Angeles Raiders ====
Quarter	1	2	3	4	Total
Raiders	0	3	3	0	6
Bears	7	7	0	3	17

at Soldier Field, Chicago, Illinois

- Date: Sunday, November 4
- Game time: 12:00 p.m.
- Game weather: 51 °F (11 °C), wind 18 mph (29 km/h)
- Referee: Pat Haggerty
- TV announcers (NBC): Dick Enberg and Merlin Olsen
- Pro-Football-Reference.com

Game information

First quarter

- CHI – Walter Payton 18-yard run (Bob Thomas kick). Bears 7–0.

Second quarter

- CHI – Walter Payton 8-yard run (Bob Thomas kick). Bears 14–0.
- LA – Chris Bahr 44-yard field goal. Bears 14–3.

Third quarter

- LA – Chris Bahr 40-yard field goal. Bears 14–6.

Fourth quarter

- CHI – Bob Thomas 29-yard field goal. Bears 17–6.

Raiders

- Marc Wilson
  7/19, 70 yards, 2 INT
- Marcus Allen
  15 rushes, 42 yards
- Todd Christensen
  5 receptions, 61 yards

Bears

- Jim McMahon
  3/11, 68 yards, INT
- Walter Payton
  27 rushes, 111 yards, 2 TD
- Willie Gault
  1 reception, 50 yards

==== Week 13 vs. Minnesota Vikings ====
Team	1	2	3	4	Total
• Bears	7	10	17	0	34
Vikings	3	0	0	0	3

- Date: November 25
- Location: Hubert H. Humphrey Metrodome
- Game weather: Indoors (dome)
- Referee: Fred Silva

Scoring summary
Q1	4:19	MIN	Stenerud 19-yard field goal	MIN 3–0
Q1	1:32	CHI	Gault 30-yard pass from Fuller (Thomas kick)	CHI 7–3
Q2	7:12	CHI	Thomas 45-yard field goal	CHI 10–3
Q2	0:24	CHI	Moorehead 13-yard pass from Fuller (Thomas kick)	CHI 17–3
Q3	9:59	CHI	Thomas 37-yard field goal	CHI 20–3
Q3	9:28	CHI	Bell 36-yard interception return (Thomas kick)	CHI 27–3
Q3	2:41	CHI	Payton 2-yard run (Thomas kick)	CHI 34–3

- Bears clinch division title

==== Week 15: vs. Green Bay Packers ====
Quarter	1	2	3	4	Total
Packers	0	7	6	7	20
Bears	0	0	7	7	14

at Soldier Field, Chicago, Illinois

- Date: Sunday, December 9
- Game time: 12:00 p.m.
- Game weather: 31 °F (−1 °C), wind 7 mph (11 km/h)
- Referee: Jim Tunney
- Pro-Football-Reference.com

Game information

Second quarter

- GB – Ed West 3-yard pass from Rich Campbell (Al Del Greco kick). Packers 7–0.

Third quarter

- CHI – Matt Suhey 2-yard pass from Walter Payton (Bob Thomas kick). Tied 7–7.
- GB – Del Rodgers 97-yard kickoff return (pass failed). Packers 13–7.

Fourth quarter

- CHI – Walter Payton 7-yard run (Bob Thomas kick). Bears 14–13.
- GB – Phil Epps 43-yard pass from Rich Campbell (Al Del Greco kick). Packers 20–14.

Top passers

- GB – Rich Campbell – 9/19, 125 yards, 2 TD, 2 INT
- CHI – Rusty Lisch – 10/23, 99 yards, INT

Top rushers

- GB – Eddie Lee Ivery – 12 rushes, 50 yards
- CHI – Walter Payton – 35 rushes, 175 yards, TD

Top receivers

- GB – Phil Epps – 3 receptions, 65 yards, TD
- CHI – Emery Moorehead – 4 receptions, 53 yards

== Postseason ==
See full article, 1984–85 NFL playoffs

The first-round matchup sent the 10–6 Bears to Washington, a team that had lost to the Los Angeles Raiders in Super Bowl XVIII. Washington was heavily favored, but Chicago came away with a 23–19 victory that featured touchdown passes from Fuller, as well as Payton on a halfback option pass.

With the momentum of defeating the defending NFC champions, the Bears then travelled to San Francisco for their first appearance in a championship game of any sort since their championship year in 1963. The line for the game came down steadily as the week wore on, but the Bears were shut out 23–0. Fuller had performed poorly in games against tough opponents, and the offense sputtered as the 49ers were able to render Walter Payton ineffective. The team had gone farther than many had expected them to go in 1984, and the season set the stage for their Super Bowl winning 1985 season.

=== Schedule ===
Game	Date	Opponent (seed)	Result	Record	Venue	Attendance
Divisional Round	December 30	at Washington Redskins (2)	W 23–19	1–0	Robert F. Kennedy Memorial Stadium	55,431
NFC Championship	January 6, 1985	at San Francisco 49ers (1)	L 0–23	1–1	Candlestick Park	61,040

=== NFC Divisional Playoff (Sunday, December 30, 1984): at Washington Redskins ===
Game summary

Quarter	1	2	3	4	Total
Bears	0	10	13	0	23
Redskins	3	0	14	2	19

at Robert F. Kennedy Memorial Stadium, Washington, D.C.

- Game time: 12:30 p.m. EST
- Game weather: Overcast, 57 °F (14 °C)
- Game attendance: 55,431
- Referee: Fred Silva
- TV announcers (CBS): Frank Glieber and Dick Vermeil

Game information
- Scoring
  - WAS – Moseley 35-yard field goal. WAS 3–0.
  - CHI – Thomas 34-yard field goal. Tied 3–3.
  - CHI – Dunsmore 19-yard pass from Payton (Thomas kick). CHI 10–3.
  - CHI – Gault 75-yard pass from Fuller (kick failed). CHI 16–3.
  - WAS – Riggins 1-yard run (Moseley kick). CHI 16–10.
  - CHI – McKinnon 16-yard pass from Fuller (Thomas kick). CHI 23–10.
  - WAS – Riggins 1-yard run (Moseley kick). CHI 23–17.
  - WAS – Finzer ran out of the end zone for a safety. CHI 23–19.

=== NFC Championship Game (Sunday, January 6, 1985): at San Francisco 49ers ===
NFC Championship Game: Chicago Bears at San Francisco 49ers

Quarter	1	2	3	4	Total
Bears (11–7)	0	0	0	0	0
49ers (17–1)	3	3	7	10	23

at Candlestick Park • San Francisco, California

- Date: January 6, 1985
- Game time: 3:00 p.m. CST
- Game weather: Drizzle, 52 °F (11 °C); wind 5 miles per hour (8.0 km/h; 4.3 kn)
- Game attendance: 61,040
- Referee: Jerry Seeman
- TV announcers (CBS): Pat Summerall (play-by-play), John Madden (color commentator) and Irv Cross (sideline reporter)

Team	Category	Player	Statistics
CHI	Passing	Steve Fuller	13/22, 87 YDS, 1 INT
CHI	Rushing	Walter Payton	22 CAR, 92 YDS
CHI	Receiving	Matt Suhey	4 REC, 11 YDS
SF	Passing	Joe Montana	18/34, 233 YDS, 1 TD, 2 INTs
SF	Rushing	Wendell Tyler	10 CAR, 68 YDS, 1 TD
SF	Receiving	Freddie Solomon	7 REC, 73 YDS, 1 TD

Scoring summary

Quarter	Time	Drive			Team	Scoring information	Score	
Quarter	Time	Plays	Yards	TOP	Team	Scoring information	CHI	SF
1	4:21				49ers	21-yard field goal by Wersching	0	3
2	7:57				49ers	22-yard field goal by Wersching	0	6
3	8:27				49ers	Tyler 9-yard touchdown run, Wersching kick good	0	13
4	12:15				49ers	Solomon 10-yard touchdown reception from Montana, Wersching kick good	0	20
4	1:56				49ers	34-yard field goal by Wersching	0	23
"TOP" = time of possession. For other American football terms, see Glossary of American football.							0	23

- Point spread: 49ers by 10
- Over/under: 40.0 (under)
- Time of game:

Bears	Game statistics	49ers
13	First downs	25
32–149	Rushes–yards	29–159
87	Passing yards	236
13–22–1	Passes	19–35–2
9–50	Sacked–yards	3–8
37	Net passing yards	228
186	Total yards	387
84	Return yards	84
7–43.1	Punts	3–39.0
1–0	Fumbles–lost	1–0
7–50	Penalties–yards	3–20
31:53	Time of Possession	28:07
