= Fog Bowl (American football) =

American football game

The Fog Bowl
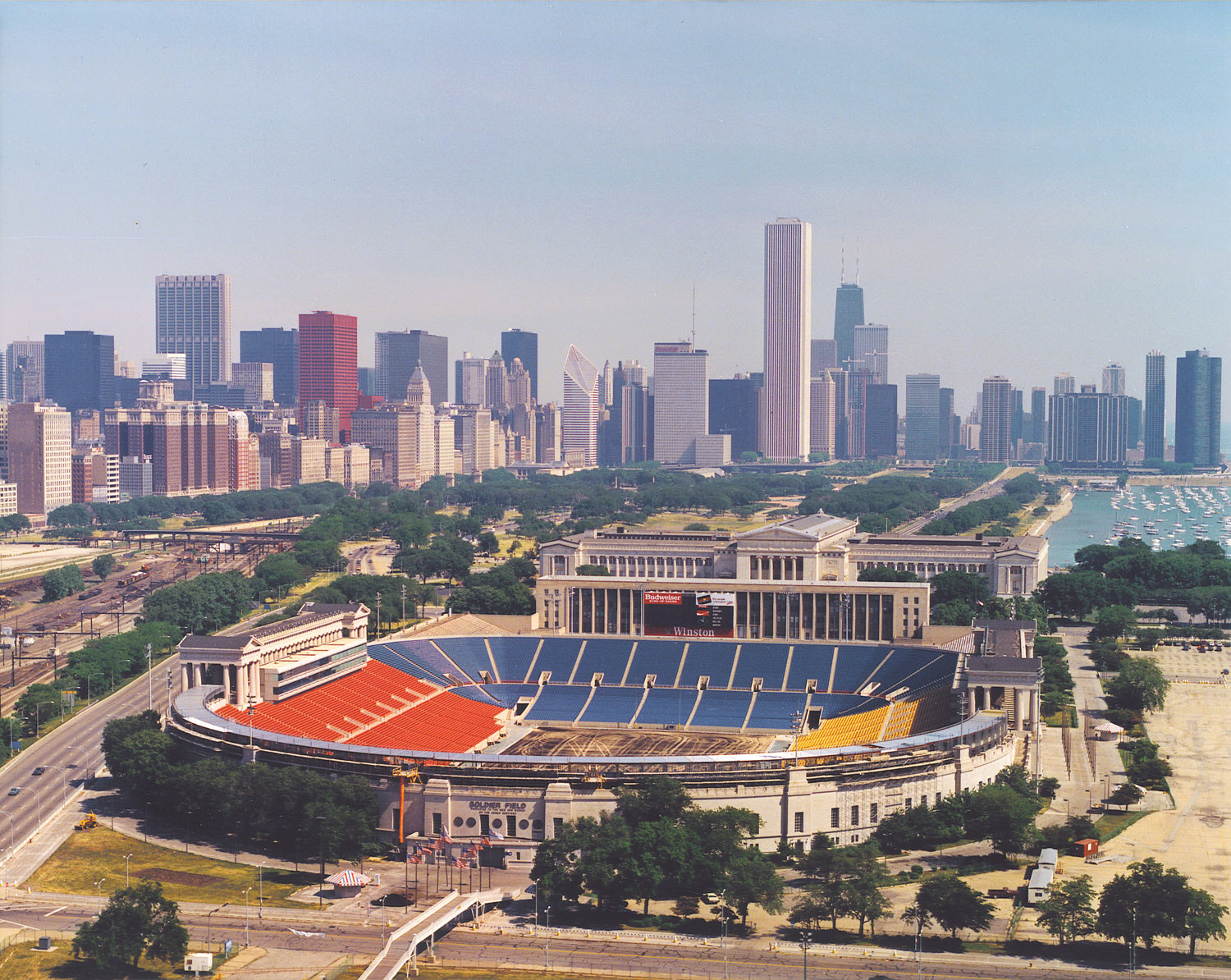
- Soldier Field in Chicago, Illinois, the site of the Fog Bowl.
Philadelphia Eagles (3) (10–6)	Chicago Bears (1) (12–4)
12	20
Head coach: Buddy Ryan	Head coach: Mike Ditka
	1	2	3	4	Total
PHI	3	6	3	0	12
CHI	7	10	0	3	20
- Date: December 31, 1988
- Stadium: Soldier Field; Chicago, Illinois
- Referee: Jim Tunney

TV in the United States
- Network: CBS
- Announcers: Verne Lundquist (play-by-play); Terry Bradshaw (analyst); Will McDonough (sideline reporter)

In American football, the Fog Bowl was the December 31, 1988 National Football League (NFL) playoff game between the Philadelphia Eagles and Chicago Bears. A dense fog rolled over Chicago's Soldier Field during the 2nd quarter, cutting visibility to about 15–20 yards for the rest of the game. The Eagles moved the ball effectively all game and their quarterback Randall Cunningham recorded 407 passing yards despite the low visibility, but they could not advance the ball into the end zone. Many players complained that they could not see the sidelines or first-down markers. The Bears ended up winning the game by a score of 20–12. The game was eventually named #3 on NFL Top 10's Weather Games.

The game was also notable in that it involved head coaches who had previously worked on the same staff of a Super Bowl winning team. Eagles coach Buddy Ryan had been the defensive coordinator for Mike Ditka on the Bears when the team won Super Bowl XX. An NFL Network special on the game highlighted how unusual the conditions were: the fog was caused by a very rare late-December mix of cold and hot air in the atmosphere, and the fog itself covered a very small part of Chicago (less than 15 city blocks) for a very short amount of time (less than three hours). If the game had been played in the late afternoon or at night, there would have been no fog during the game at all.

== Game summary ==
Chicago scored first with quarterback Mike Tomczak's 64-yard touchdown pass to Dennis McKinnon. The Eagles responded by driving to the Chicago 26-yard line, but kicker Luis Zendejas missed a 43-yard field goal attempt. Philadelphia quickly got the ball back after linebacker Seth Joyner intercepted a pass from Tomczak on the next play and returned it 8 yards to the Bears 31-yard line. This time they managed to score with Zendejas' 42-yard field goal, but only after committing two costly mistakes: twice on the drive Philadelphia had touchdowns nullified by penalties, both on running back Anthony Toney. The Bears then drove to the Eagles 33-yard line on their ensuing drive, but it stalled there and kicker Kevin Butler missed a 51-yard field goal attempt, giving the ball back to Philadelphia with great field position. Quarterback Randall Cunningham then led the Eagles down the field with two completions to fullback Keith Byars for gains of 13 and 24 yards. A few plays later, faced with 3rd and 32, Cunningham completed a 31-yard pass to Ron Johnson, bringing up 4th and 1 on the Bears 4-yard line. Cunningham tried to convert the 4th down with a QB sneak, but after a chain measurement which took several minutes, officials ruled the ball short of a first down. The Eagles soon got another chance to score when Andre Waters forced a fumble from Cap Boso that was recovered by defensive back Wes Hopkins on the Chicago 15. Following another missed chance at a touchdown when rookie tight end Keith Jackson dropped a wide open pass in the end zone, Zendejas' 29-yard field goal to cut the deficit to 7–6.

Philadelphia tackled Chicago returner Dennis Gentry on the 22 on the ensuing kickoff, but the kick had to be redone due to an offsides penalty on the Eagles. This proved to be hugely beneficial for Chicago, as on the second kick, Glen Kozlowski returned the ball 23 yards to the Philadelphia 44-yard line. A few plays later, Tomczak's 30-yard completion to Ron Morris gave Chicago a first down on the Eagles 4-yard line, and Neal Anderson ran for a touchdown on the next play to give them a 14–6 lead. Then after forcing a punt, Thomas Sanders' 58-yard run set up a 46-yard field goal by Butler, increasing Chicago's lead to 17-6 with less than 2:03 left before halftime. At this point, a thick fog rolled on to field, obscuring vision so much that a CBS helicopter providing aerial coverage for the game was forced to land. Meanwhile, Philadelphia struck back with a 65-yard completion from Cunningham to Jackson that set up Zendejas' 30-yard field goal, and the teams went into their locker rooms with Chicago leading 17–9.

In the third quarter, the fog was so thick that both teams were forced to use their running game because receivers could not see the long passes thrown to them. TV and radio announcers, and the fans in the stadium had trouble seeing what was happening on the field. CBS color commentator Terry Bradshaw, who was working the game, later said he was more frustrated than at any time when he was a player (this was several years before networks regularly employed sideline reporters). Referee Jim Tunney ended up announcing the down and distance for each play on his wireless microphone. The NFL was monitoring the conditions but never considered postponing or delaying the game, because the fog posed no danger to fans or players, unlike situations that involved lightning or high winds (conditions were analogous to heavy rain or snow accumulations in that regard).

Philadelphia took the second half kickoff and drove to the Bears 12-yard line, only to lose the ball again when Cunningham threw a pass that went off the hands of Toney and was intercepted by Vestee Jackson, who returned the ball 51 yards to the Eagles 41-yard line. Chicago then drove to the 15, but also came up empty when Butler's field goal attempt went off the goal post. Following a punt, Tomczak was knocked out of the game by a massive hit from Eagles lineman Reggie White, while defensive back Terry Hoage intercepted his pass and returned it 12 yards to the Chicago 18-yard line. Three plays later, Zendejas kicked a 35-yard field goal, making the score 17-12 with less than two minutes left in the third quarter.

Chicago, now led by Jim McMahon, responded with their next drive, converting a 23-yard run by Anderson into a 27-yard Butler field goal to go back up by 8 points, 20-12 with 12:34 left in the game. Philadelphia responded with a drive to the Bears 22, but on third down, a long sack by Sean Smith pushed them out of field goal range. The next time they got the ball, Maurice Douglass intercepted a pass from Cunningham, enabling Chicago to run out the rest of the clock.

Cunningham finished the game with 407 passing yards, but was unable to lead his team to a single touchdown and was intercepted 3 times. Fullback Keith Byars rushed for 34 yards and caught 9 passes for 103 yards. Tight end Keith Jackson caught 7 passes for 142 yards. Other than his 64-yard touchdown pass, Tomczak was dominated the rest of the game by the Eagles defense, completing only 10 of 20 passes for 174 yards with 1 touchdown and 3 interceptions. McKinnon finished the game with 4 receptions for 108 yards and a touchdown.

=== Box score ===
1988 NFC Divisional Playoffs: (3) Philadelphia Eagles at (1) Chicago Bears – Game summary

Quarter	1	2	3	4	Total
Eagles	3	6	3	0	12
Bears	7	10	0	3	20

at Soldier Field, Chicago, Illinois

- Date: December 31, 1988
- Game time: 12:30 p.m. CDT
- Game weather: 25 °F (−4 °C), sunny, then fog in the 2nd half
- Referee: Jim Tunney
- TV announcers (CBS): Verne Lundquist (play-by-play), Terry Bradshaw (analyst), and Will McDonough (sideline reporter)
- Pro Football Reference

Game information

First quarter

- CHI - TD: Dennis McKinnon 64-yard pass from Mike Tomczak (Kevin Butler kick) 7-0 CHI
- PHI - FG: Luis Zendejas 42 yard 7-3 CHI

Second quarter

- PHI - FG: Luis Zendejas 29-yard FG 7-6 CHI
- CHI - TD: Neal Anderson 4-yard run (Butler kick) 14-6 CHI
- CHI - FG: Kevin Butler 46-yard FG 17-6 CHI
- PHI - FG: Luis Zendejas 30-yard FG 17-9 CHI

Third quarter

- PHI - FG: Luis Zendejas 35 yard 17-12 CHI

Fourth quarter

- CHI - FG: Kevin Butler 27 yard 20-12 CHI

Top passers

- PHI – Randall Cunningham – 27/54, 407 YDS, 0 TD, 3 INT
- CHI – Mike Tomczak – 10/20, 172 YDS, TD, 3 INT

Top rushers

- PHI – Keith Byars – 7 CAR, 34 YDS
- CHI – Thomas Sanders – 8 CAR, 94 YDS

Top receivers

- PHI – Keith Jackson – 7 REC, 142 YDS
- CHI – Dennis McKinnon – 4 REC, 108 YDS, TD

== Statistics ==
Source:	Philadelphia Eagles	Chicago Bears
First downs	22	14
Total yards	430	341
Passing yards	378	175
Passing – completions/attempts	27/55	12/23
Rushing yards	52	164
Rushing attempts	16	33
Penalties–yards	7–60	1–5
Sacks against–yards	4–29	1–8
Fumbles–lost	0–0	1–1
Interceptions thrown	3	3

=== Individual statistics ===
*Completions/Attempts
a Carries
b Longest play
c Receptions
d Tackles
e Forced Fumbles
f Longest field goal

Eagles Passing
Player	C/ATT^{*}	Yds	TD	INT
Randall Cunningham	27/54	407	0	3
Cris Carter	0/1	0	0	0
Eagles Rushing
Player	Car^{a}	Yds	TD	LG^{b}
Keith Byars	7	34	0	13
Anthony Toney	5	3	0	3
Randall Cunningham	3	12	0	11
Michael Haddix	1	3	0	3
Eagles Receiving
Player	Rec^{c}	Yds	TD	LG^{b}
Keith Byars	9	103	0	24
Keith Jackson	7	142	0	65
Mike Quick	5	82	0	23
Michael Haddix	2	23	0	13
Anthony Toney	2	9	0	7
Ron Johnson	1	31	0	31
Cris Carter	1	17	0	17
Eagles Defense
Player	Tak/Ast/Tot^{d}	Int	Ff^{e}	Sck
Reggie White	N/A	0	0	1.0
Terry Hoage	N/A	1	0	0.0
Seth Joyner	N/A	1	8	0.0
Todd Bell	N/A	1	4	0.0
Wes Hopkins	N/A	0	1	0.0
Eagles Kicking
Player	FGA	FGM	XP	LG^{f}
Luis Zendejas	5	4	0/0	N/A

Bears Passing
	C/ATT^{*}	Yds	TD	INT
Mike Tomczak	10/20	172	1	3
Jim McMahon	2/3	13	0	0
Bears Rushing
Player	Car^{a}	Yds	TD	LG^{b}
Neal Anderson	14	54	1	23
Thomas Sanders	8	94	0	58
Brad Muster	6	12	0	6
Jim McMahon	2	−2	0	0
Matt Suhey	1	0	0	0
Mike Tomczak	1	0	0	0
Bears Receiving
Player	Rec^{c}	Yds	TD	LG^{b}
Dennis McKinnon	4	108	1	64
Cap Boso	2	16	0	9
Dennis Gentry	2	9	0	7
Ron Morris	1	27	0	27
Wendell Davis	1	11	0	11
Thomas Sanders	1	8	0	8
Neal Anderson	1	6	0	6
Bears Defense
Player	Tak/Ast/Tot^{d}	Int	Ff^{e}	Sck
Dan Hampton	N/A	0	0	1.0
Al Harris	N/A	0	0	1.0
Ron Rivera	N/A	0	0	1.0
Sean Smith	N/A	0	0	1.0
Vestee Jackson	N/A	1	0	0.0
Maurice Douglass	N/A	1	0	0.0
Mickey Pruitt	N/A	1	0	0.0
Bears Kicking
Player	FGA	FGM	XP	LG^{f}
Kevin Butler	4	2	2/2	N/A

== Officials ==
- Referee: Jim Tunney (#32)
- Umpire: Ron Botchan (#110)
- Head linesman: Tom Johnson (#114)
- Line judge: Bama Glass (#15)
- Back judge: Tom Sifferman (#118)
- Side judge: Dave Parry (#64)
- Field judge: Jack Vaughan (#93)

== Other notable fog-related games ==
On January 5, 1997, the New England Patriots hosted the Pittsburgh Steelers in the AFC Divisional Round. The game, which New England won 28–3 en route to making Super Bowl XXXI, also featured foggy conditions at Foxboro Stadium, though not as severe as the 1988 Fog Bowl. This game also involved Mike Tomczak, who started at quarterback for the Steelers.

On October 22, 2017, the Patriots hosted the Atlanta Falcons in a rematch of Super Bowl LI the previous season. The game, which took place at a foggy Gillette Stadium, became notable for the extensive use of Skycam by NBC due to visibility issues surrounding the press box cameras. The Patriots won the game 23–7.

On December 12, 2020, during an NCAA FBS game between Southeastern Conference rivals LSU and Florida, a thick fog enveloped Ben Hill Griffin Stadium in Gainesville between the third and fourth quarters, forcing ESPN to abandon its main camera atop the press box after two plays of the final period and switch to its Skycam. The 3-5 Tigers defeated the 8-1 and No. 6-ranked Gators 37-34 when Cade York made a 57-yard field goal with 23 seconds remaining.

== See also ==
- 1988–89 NFL playoffs
- 1975 Stanley Cup Finals Fog Game
- 1974 Sun Bowl
- 50th Grey Cup
- Double Doink
- List of nicknamed NFL games and plays
