= 1988 Chicago Bears season =

NFL team season

- Head coach: Mike Ditka
- Offensive coordinator: Ed Hughes
- Defensive coordinator: Vince Tobin
- Home stadium: Soldier Field

Results
- Record: 12–4
- Division place: 1st NFC Central
- Playoffs: Won Divisional Playoffs (vs. Eagles) 20–12; Lost NFC Championship (vs. 49ers) 3–28

The 1988 Chicago Bears season was their 69th regular season and 19th postseason completed in the National Football League. This season marked the first time since 1974 that Walter Payton was not on the Bears' opening day roster. The Bears looked to improve on an 11–4 finish that won them the NFC Central Division but ended abruptly when they were eliminated for the second consecutive year by the Washington Redskins.

The Bears won 12 games and lost 4, tying for the best record in the league with the Buffalo Bills and the AFC Champion Cincinnati Bengals. They earned home field advantage in the NFC. The Bears defeated the Philadelphia Eagles 20–12 in the "Fog Bowl" game during the Divisional Round of the playoffs. However, the Bears failed to advance to the Super Bowl as one of the NFC's top two seeds for a third straight season, falling to the eventual Super Bowl champion San Francisco 49ers 28–3 in the NFC Championship Game at Soldier Field. This was the second time that the 49ers and Bears had met for a trip to the Super Bowl during the decade, with the 49ers previously defeating the Bears in the 1984 NFC Championship Game on their way to Super Bowl XIX.

Coach Mike Ditka suffered a heart attack during the season, but was back on the sidelines 11 days later. Ditka was named coach of the year for the second time in his career. 1988 also marked Jim McMahon's last season as starter for the Bears, as he was traded during the following offseason to the San Diego Chargers.

Prior to the Bears' 1988 season, the playing surface at Soldier Field was changed from artificial turf to natural grass.

== Offseason ==
=== NFL draft ===
1988 Chicago Bears draft
Round	Pick	Player	Position	College	Notes
1	23	Brad Muster	Fullback	Stanford	
1	27	Wendell Davis	Wide receiver	LSU	
2	51	Dante Jones	Linebacker	Oklahoma	
3	78	Ralph Jarvis	Defensive end	Temple	
4	105	James Thornton	Tight end	Cal State-Fullerton	
5	133	Troy Johnson	Linebacker	Oklahoma	
6	161	Lemuel Stinson	Cornerback	Texas Tech	
7	189	Caesar Rentie	Offensive tackle	Oklahoma	
8	208	David Tate	Safety	Colorado	
8	217	Harvey Reed	Running back	Howard	
9	245	Rogie Magee	Wide receiver	LSU	
10	273	Joe Porter	Guard	Baylor	
11	301	Steve Forch	Linebacker	Nebraska	
12	329	Greg Clark	Linebacker	Arizona State	
Made roster

=== Undrafted free agents ===
1988 undrafted free agents of note
Player	Position	College
Mike Barnard	Tackle	San Jose State
Keith Blue	Guard	Western Illinois
Jeff Burger	Quarterback	Auburn
Richard Ehmke	Kicker	Eastern Illinois
Phil Webb	Running back	Michigan
Dan Young	Defensive tackle	VMI

== Roster ==
1988 Team Starters

Offense

- 9 Jim McMahon QB
- 35 Neal Anderson RB
- 26 Matt Suhey FB
- 85 Dennis McKinnon WR/PR
- 29 Dennis Gentry WR/KR
- 80 James Thornton TE
- 73 John Wojciechowski LT
- 62 Mark Bortz LG
- 63 Jay Hilgenberg C
- 57 Tom Thayer RG
- 78 Keith Van Horne RT

Defense

- 90 Al Harris LDE
- 76 Steve McMichael LDT
- 99 Dan Hampton RDT
- 95 Richard Dent RDE
- 59 Ron Rivera LB
- 50 Mike Singletary LB
- 51 Jim Morrissey LB
- 27 Mike Richardson LCB
- 24 Vestee Jackson RCB
- 22 Dave Duerson SS
- 37 Maurice Douglass FS
- 6 Kevin Butler K
- 15 Bryan Wagner P

=== Final roster ===
1988 Chicago Bears roster
Quarterbacks (QB): 4 Jim Harbaugh; 9 Jim McMahon; 18 Mike Tomczak; Running backs (RB): 35 Neal Anderson; 25 Brad Muster FB; 20 Thomas Sanders KR; 26 Matt Suhey FB; Wide receivers (WR): 82 Wendell Davis; 29 Dennis Gentry; 88 Glen Kozlowski KR; 85 Dennis McKinnon PR; 84 Ron Morris; Tight ends (TE): 86 Cap Boso; 87 Emery Moorehead; 98 Brent Novoselsky; 80 James Thornton	Offensive linemen (OL): 54 John Adickes C; 79 Kurt Becker G; 62 Mark Bortz G; 74 Jim Covert T; 63 Jay Hilgenberg C; 71 Caesar Rentie T; 57 Tom Thayer G; 78 Keith Van Horne T; 73 John Wojciechowski T; Defensive linemen (DL): 94 Dick Chapura DT; 99 Dan Hampton DT; 90 Al Harris DE; 76 Steve McMichael DT; 75 John Shannon DT; 97 Sean Smith DE	Linebackers (LB): 98 Greg Clark LB; 92 Troy Johnson OLB; 53 Dante Jones MLB; 51 Jim Morrissey OLB; 52 Mickey Pruitt OLB; 59 Ron Rivera OLB; 50 Mike Singletary MLB; Defensive backs (DB): 37 Maurice Douglass FS; 22 Dave Duerson SS; 24 Vestee Jackson CB; 44 Todd Krumm FS; 43 Lorenzo Lynch CB/S; 27 Mike Richardson CB; 32 Lemuel Stinson CB; 49 David Tate SS; Special teams (ST): 6 Kevin Butler K; 15 Bryan Wagner P	Reserve: 21 William Bell S (IR); 68 Paul Blair T (IR); 95 Richard Dent DE (IR); 23 Shaun Gayle S (IR); 9 Jim McMahon QB (IR); 72 William Perry DT (IR); 30 Eric Starr RB (IR); 39 Curtis Stewart RB (IR); 55 Otis Wilson LB (IR); -- Darrin Woody CB (IR); Rookies in italics 47 active, 10 reserve

== Regular season ==
=== Schedule ===
Week	Date	Opponent	Result	Attendance
1	September 4	Miami Dolphins	W 34–7	63,330
2	September 11	at Indianapolis Colts	W 17–13	60,503
3	September 18	Minnesota Vikings	L 7–31	63,990
4	September 25	at Green Bay Packers	W 24–6	56,492
5	October 2	Buffalo Bills	W 24–3	62,793
6	October 9	at Detroit Lions	W 24–7	64,526
7	October 16	Dallas Cowboys	W 17–7	64,759
8	October 24	San Francisco 49ers	W 10–9	65,293
9	October 30	at New England Patriots	L 7–30	60,821
10	November 6	Tampa Bay Buccaneers	W 28–10	56,892
11	November 13	at Washington Redskins	W 34–14	52,418
12	November 20	at Tampa Bay Buccaneers	W 27–15	67,070
13	November 27	Green Bay Packers	W 16–0	62,026
14	December 5	at Los Angeles Rams	L 3–23	65,579
15	December 11	Detroit Lions	W 13–12	55,010
16	December 19	at Minnesota Vikings	L 27–28	62,067

=== Game summaries ===
==== Week 1 ====
Team	1	2	3	4	Total
Dolphins	7	0	0	0	7
• Bears	14	14	0	6	34

- Date: September 4
- Location: Soldier Field, Chicago, Illinois
- Game start: 12:00 p.m.
- Game weather: 66 °F (19 °C) • Wind 16 mph (26 km/h)
- Referee: Pat Haggerty
- TV announcers (NBC): Dick Enberg and Merlin Olsen

Scoring summary
1	CHI	Neal Anderson 2-yard run (Kevin Butler kick)	Bears 7–0
1	CHI	Neal Anderson 1-yard run (Kevin Butler kick)	Bears 14–0
1	MIA	Mark Clayton 28-yard pass from Dan Marino (Fuad Reveiz kick)	Bears 14–7
2	CHI	Jim McMahon 1-yard run (Kevin Butler kick)	Bears 21–7
2	CHI	Jim McMahon 2-yard run (Kevin Butler kick)	Bears 28–7
4	CHI	Thomas Sanders 20-yard run (kick failed)	Bears 34–7

==== Week 4 ====
Team	1	2	3	4	Total
• Bears	0	17	0	7	24
Packers	6	0	0	0	6

- Date: September 25
- Location: Lambeau Field
- Game start: 1:00 p.m. EST
- Game weather: 58 °F (14 °C); wind 10 mph (16 km/h)
- Referee: Tom Dooley
- Television network: CBS

Scoring summary
Q1	GB	Fullwood 2 yard run (kick failed)	GB 6–0
Q2	CHI	Anderson 45 yard run (Butler kick)	CHI 7–6
Q2	CHI	Anderson 4 yard run (Butler kick)	CHI 14–6
Q2	CHI	Butler 35 yard field goal	CHI 17–6
Q4	CHI	Sanders 5 yard run (Butler kick)	CHI 24–6

==== Week 13 ====
Team	1	2	3	4	Total
Packers	0	0	0	0	0
• Bears	7	0	7	2	16

- Date: November 27
- Location: Soldier Field
- Game start: 1:00 p.m. EST
- Game weather: 43 °F (6 °C); wind 20 mph (32 km/h)
- Referee: Pat Haggerty
- TV announcers (CBS): Pat Summerall and John Madden

Scoring summary
Q1	CHI	Anderson 1 yard run (Butler kick)	CHI 7–0
Q3	CHI	Anderson 80 yard run (Butler kick)	CHI 14–0
Q4	CHI	Safety, Majkowski stepped out of end zone	CHI 16–0

=== Standings ===
NFC Central
	W	L	T	PCT	DIV	CONF	PF	PA	STK
Chicago Bears^{(1)}	12	4	0	.750	6–2	9–3	312	215	L1
Minnesota Vikings^{(4)}	11	5	0	.688	6–2	9–3	406	233	W1
Tampa Bay Buccaneers	5	11	0	.313	4–4	4–8	261	350	W1
Detroit Lions	4	12	0	.250	2–6	3–11	220	315	L2
Green Bay Packers	4	12	0	.250	2–6	3–9	240	313	W2

== Playoffs ==
In the divisional playoffs, the Bears defeated the Philadelphia Eagles in the Fog Bowl, earning their first postseason victory since Super Bowl XX. A week later, Chicago was routed 28–3 by the San Francisco 49ers. This was the Bears' last appearance in the NFC Championship Game until 2006.

=== Divisional ===
Team	1	2	3	4	Total
Eagles	3	6	3	0	12
• Bears	7	10	0	3	20

- Date: December 31
- Location: Soldier Field • Chicago, Illinois
- Game start: 12:30 p.m. EST
- Game attendance: 65,534
- Game weather: Fog • 25 °F (−4 °C) • Wind 7 mph (11 km/h)
- Referee: Jim Tunney
- TV announcers (CBS): Verne Lundquist & Terry Bradshaw

Scoring summary
1	CHI	Dennis McKinnon 64-yard pass from Mike Tomczak (Kevin Butler kick)	Bears 7–0
1	PHI	Luis Zendejas 42-yard field goal	Bears 7–3
2	PHI	Luis Zendejas 29-yard field goal	Bears 7–6
2	CHI	Neal Anderson 4-yard run (Kevin Butler kick)	Bears 14–6
2	CHI	Kevin Butler 46-yard field goal	Bears 17–6
2	PHI	Luis Zendejas 30-yard field goal	Bears 17–9
3	PHI	Luis Zendejas 35-yard field goal	Bears 17–12
4	CHI	Kevin Butler 27-yard field goal	Bears 20–12

=== NFC Championship ===
Team	1	2	3	4	Total
• 49ers	7	7	7	7	28
Bears	0	3	0	0	3

- Date: January 8
- Location: Soldier Field • Chicago, Illinois
- Game start: 4:00 p.m. EST
- Game attendance: 66,946
- Referee: Bob McElwee
- TV announcers (CBS): Pat Summerall & John Madden
