= Troy Johnson =

Troy Johnson may refer to:

- Troy Johnson (cricketer), New Zealand cricketer
- Troy Johnson (footballer), Australian rules footballer
- Troy Johnson (producer), American songwriter and producer
- Troy Johnson (singer), American gospel and soul singer
- Troy Johnson (wide receiver), American football wide receiver
- Troy Johnson (writer), American food critic and writer
- Troy Johnson (linebacker), American football linebacker with the 1988 Chicago Bears
