= Maurice Douglass =

American football player (born 1964)

No. 36, 37, 24
- Position: Safety

Personal information
- Born: February 12, 1964 (age 62); Muncie, Indiana, U.S.
- Listed height: 5 ft 11 in (1.80 m)
- Listed weight: 210 lb (95 kg)

Career information
- High school: Trotwood-Madison (Trotwood, Ohio)
- College: Kentucky
- NFL draft: 1986: 8th round, 221st overall pick

Career history
- Chicago Bears (1986–1994); New York Giants (1995–1996)

Career NFL statistics
- Tackles: 274
- Interceptions: 6
- Fumble recoveries: 12
- Stats at Pro Football Reference

Maurice Gerrard "Mo" Douglass (born February 12, 1964) is an American high school football coach at Springfield High School and a former professional football player who was a safety for eleven seasons in the National Football League (NFL) for the Chicago Bears and New York Giants. Douglass played college football at the University of Kentucky after transferring from Coffeyville Community College.

Douglass played nine seasons with the Bears on special teams and as a nickel back. He then played two seasons with the Giants. In his early years, he was a witness in a federal trial involving illegal activities by a pair of sports agents.

In high school, he had played for Trotwood-Madison High School and graduated in 1982. He returned to coach the team in 2001. In 2006, he led the team to the playoffs for the first time in 25 years. That year, he was accused of luring players from other teams and found guilty the following year, which was met with a brief suspension.

== Early life and amateur career ==
Born in Muncie, Indiana, Douglass graduated from Trotwood-Madison High School in 1982 and then played defensive back for Kentucky. In 1984, he was a junior college transfer from Coffeyville Community College and earned the starting job for Kentucky after two games. He made an interception on his first play from scrimmage against the Rutgers Scarlet Knights team on October 6. Two weeks later he had an interception that set up a 36-yard field goal against LSU. He totalled three interceptions in his two-year career at Kentucky. On November 3, he recovered a fumble against North Texas State. That season Kentucky got off to a 5–0 start, but they lost to all three ranked Southeastern Conference schools that they faced and finished the season 9–3.

In September 1985, he suffered from a pinched nerve and was notable for having blown his defensive coverage on two plays in a 27–7 victory over Cincinnati Bearcats. The last of his interceptions occurred on November 16, 1985, against the Florida Gators when his 43-yard return set up Kentucky's touchdown that gave them a 13–12 lead. However, in the waning seconds as they clung to a 13–12 lead, his attempt at a second interception on an errant halfback option pass by future Bears teammate Neal Anderson slipped away and Florida was able to execute the winning field goal in their 15–13 victory. Douglass was selected to play for the Gray team in the 1985 Blue–Gray Football Classic.

== Playing career ==
=== Chicago Bears ===
With the last pick of the eighth round of the 1986 NFL draft and 221st overall selection, the Bears drafted Douglass. He was the third of four defensive backs selected by the Bears in that draft (Vestee Jackson 2nd round, Bruce Jones 7th round, and Barton Hundley 10th round). The 1986 Bears signed Douglass in mid-July. In training camp, Douglas was switched from cornerback to safety and recovered a fumble in the first exhibition game against the Cowboys. He was described by bears scout Rod Graves as "built more like a fullback and could possibly help us inside as a strong-safety type". The Chicago Tribune listed him at 5 feet 10 inches (1.78 m) and 202 pounds (92 kg), and the Chicago Sun-Times reported him at 5 feet 10.5 inches (1.79 m) and 200 pounds (91 kg) with the description that "Big, strong, tough hitter who likes to play. A little too slow to play cornerback. Makes some mistakes because of overeagerness."

Douglass was one of the final five players cut during training camp by the Bears at the beginning of September, but they re-signed him in late November when they put Jim McMahon on injured reserve. He did not play much in 1986, but was described as a favorite of coach Mike Ditka by the Chicago Sun-Times. Chicago Tribune writers noted that Ditka got a kick out of his big earring and fashion sense. In the 1987–88 NFL playoffs, although had only one previous start in his two-year career, he started for the Bears in place of five-year veteran Mike Richardson at left cornerback against the Redskins in their January 10, 1988 Divisional playoff game. The following season, when Shaun Gayle suffered a season-ending injury for the 1988 Bears, he took over the starting free safety assignment.

In March 1989, he testified against sports agents Norby Walters of New York and Lloyd Bloom of California in United States District Court in Chicago in a trial about "inducing college athletes to sign professional contracts in violation of National Collegiate Athletic Association rules, and of threatening bodily harm". He told the jury that Bloom threatened that "somebody might break my legs" if he attempted to break his contract. In April, the agents were convicted of five counts of racketeering and fraud.

In August 1989, he was one of thirteen athletes issued a four-game suspension for using steroids. Following the suspension, the Bears activated him in October.

In September 1994, Richie Anderson of the New York Jets dislocated an index finger by punching Douglass in the head, while Douglass was wearing a football helmet, in reaction to what he believed was a late hit on teammate Adrian Murrell. Anderson was ejected from the game. In his nine seasons with the Bears, he earned a reputation as an excellent special teams player.

=== New York Giants ===
Prior to his time with the Giants, he worked as a male stripper. Following the 1994 NFL season, Douglass signed with the New York Giants in April. The two-year contract was estimated at $1.4 million. Douglass was impaired by a quadriceps injury in 1995 Giants training camp. The injury recurred during the season. He had performed well as the nickel back as a Giant. However, in October, he fractured his left fibula and was out for the rest of 1995 NFL season.

Douglass appeared to be a likely roster cut during the 1996 Giants training camp final selection of its 53-man roster of players, but he made the final roster cut. In the second game of the 1996 NFL season, he made a fourth-and-one goalline stop against the Cowboys. Later that season, he scored his only career touchdown when he intercepted a Scott Mitchell pass and returned it 32 yards against the Detroit Lions on October 27. Late in the season he was affected by a hamstring injury.

Douglass re-signed for the 1997 New York Giants season. Douglass was in competition with Sam Garnes and Rodney Young for the starting strong safety position for the 1997 NFL season. However, in training camp he was hampered by a deep thigh bruise. Despite the injury, he was projected as the starter. The injury caused him to miss an exhibition game. When he returned to practice he was soon also dealing with a sprained elbow. He lost the job to Garnes after missing a lot of exhibition time and allowing the latter to see plenty of action. In addition to the injury, Douglass had had a poor exhibition showing.

== Coaching career ==
In 2001, he became the football coach at his alma mater Trotwood. He transformed the program by spending time creating player highlight reels, responding to college recruiters and taking his athletes on college tours. Subsequently, the athletes began getting college scholarship offers. In his first seven years nearly 100 of his players went on to play college football and over one-third at Division I programs. He is said to have a relaxed mentoring style of coaching and is known as Coach Doug. In 2007, the team made the playoffs for the first time since 1982. That year, he was charged with illegally recruiting athletes to play for his team. Upon review by the Ohio High School Athletic Association, he and his staff were found guilty of the charge. In 2008, he was placed on suspension for three weeks and his offensive coordinator resigned. The school was placed on two-year probation.

In 2014, Douglass left Trotwood and became the head coach at Springfield High School. Before taking the position at Springfield, Douglass turned down an opportunity to coach defensive backs for Vanderbilt under new head coach Derek Mason.
