= Mike Tomczak =

American football player and coach (born 1962)

Youngstown State Penguins
- Title: Assistant coach

Personal information
- Born: October 23, 1962 (age 64); Calumet City, Illinois, U.S.
- Listed height: 6 ft 1 in (1.85 m)
- Listed weight: 210 lb (95 kg)

Career information
- High school: Thornton Fractional North (Calumet City)
- College: Ohio State
- NFL draft: 1985: undrafted

Career history

Playing
- Chicago Bears (1985–1990); Green Bay Packers (1991); Cleveland Browns (1992); Pittsburgh Steelers (1993–1999); Detroit Lions (2000)

Coaching
- Pittsburgh Power (2010–2014) Offensive coordinator; Youngstown State (2017–present) Volunteer coach

Awards and highlights
- Super Bowl champion (XX)

Career NFL statistics
- Passing attempts: 2,337
- Passing completions: 1,248
- Completion percentage: 53.4%
- TD–INT: 88–106
- Passing yards: 16,079
- Passer rating: 68.9
- Rushing yards: 526
- Rushing touchdowns: 9
- Stats at Pro Football Reference

Michael John Tomczak (born October 23, 1962) is an American former professional football player who was a quarterback in National Football League (NFL) from 1985 through 1999. He played college football for the Ohio State Buckeyes. He played in the NFL for the Chicago Bears, Green Bay Packers, Cleveland Browns, and Pittsburgh Steelers.

Tomczak was the offensive coordinator for the Pittsburgh Power of the Arena Football League (AFL) until 2014 when they ceased operations. He is sometimes described as one of the more successful NFL quarterbacks produced by Ohio State University.

== Early life and college ==
Tomczak is of Polish descent.

He attended Thornton Fractional North in Calumet City, Illinois. He attended college at The Ohio State University and played for its football team, the Buckeyes.

== Professional football ==
=== Chicago Bears ===
Tomczak went undrafted out of college and signed as an original free agent with the Chicago Bears. He started no games his first year but did earn a Super Bowl ring, and saw playing time in Super Bowl XX on January 26, 1986, during the fourth quarter of the Bears' 46–10 win over the New England Patriots on the kickoff unit, where he was penalized for a facemask penalty. He was a member of the "Shuffling Crew" in the Bears' video for The Super Bowl Shuffle, mimicking playing guitar. Tomczak was tabbed to start seven games in 1986 while appearing in six others, with varying levels of activity as opposed to using Steve Fuller. His first start was against Philadelphia in week two, and he threw 10-of-20 for 116 yards with two interceptions, but the Bears won 13–10. By late season, the Bears, lacking Jim McMahon due to a rotator cuff injury that saw him knocked for the remainder of the season, signed Doug Flutie, which saw him throw passes in week 13 and 14 before being tapped to replace Tomczak against the Detroit Lions due to injury (the plan for the game was to have Flutie play only in the second half) and then start the following week and the subsequent playoff game. In total, Tomczak threw for 1,105 yards with two touchdowns to ten interceptions. He played for the Bears until 1990 starting 31 games and throwing for 31 touchdowns and 47 interceptions.

=== Green Bay Packers ===
Tomczak was signed by the Green Bay Packers after the 1990 season and started seven games, throwing 11 touchdown passes, 128 completions and 9 interceptions. He was cut by the Packers on Monday, August 31, 1992, after not participating in training camp activities or appearing in the entire preseason due to a lengthy contract holdout.

=== Pittsburgh Steelers ===
After spending a year with the Green Bay Packers and another with the Cleveland Browns, he signed with the Pittsburgh Steelers in 1993 and spent seven seasons with the team, starting for much of the 1996 season and helping to guide the team into the playoffs. He started occasionally throughout his last three seasons with the Steelers, spelling Kordell Stewart for long stretches of the year in 1999.

After his contract with Pittsburgh was not renewed, he signed with the Detroit Lions in 2000 but suffered a broken right tibia in an exhibition game against the Oakland Raiders. After being forced to sit out the entire season, he retired from football, the last remaining active player from the 1985 Bears team. When asked about this, he replied, "Well, I had my run and I think it's time for new rookies to take my place on this team."

For his career, Tomczak had 73 starts, completed 55.3% of his passes for 88 touchdowns and 106 interceptions.

=== Career highlights ===
Among Tomczak's NFL career highlights, he won his first 10 starts at quarterback, all with Chicago, which set an NFL Record (breaking the mark set by former Pittsburgh Steeler Mike Kruczek). The mark was eventually topped by former Steeler QB Ben Roethlisberger. In 1988, Tomczak was the starting QB for Chicago in the infamous "Fog Bowl" playoff game against the Philadelphia Eagles, guiding the Bears to a 20–12 victory that put them in the NFC Championship Game. Tomczak started the last 15 games of the regular season, plus two playoff games, for Pittsburgh in 1996. The Steelers won 11 of those games, losing in the playoffs to eventual AFC champions, the New England Patriots. In his final regular season game, Pittsburgh lost a shoot-out against the Tennessee Titans 47–36, the highest scoring game in the history of Three Rivers Stadium. Tomczak passed for 309 yards and 2 touchdowns in his final game.

== NFL career statistics ==
Year	Team	Games			Passing								Rushing			
Year	Team	GP	GS	Record	Cmp	Att	Pct	Yds	Y/A	TD	Int	Rtg	Att	Yds	Avg	TD
1985	CHI	6	0	–	2	6	33.3	33	5.5	0	0	52.8	2	3	1.5	0
1986	CHI	13	7	7–0	74	151	49.0	1,105	7.3	2	10	50.2	23	117	5.1	3
1987	CHI	12	6	4–2	97	178	54.5	1,220	6.9	5	10	62.0	18	54	3.0	1
1988	CHI	14	5	4–1	86	170	50.6	1,310	7.7	7	6	75.4	13	40	3.1	1
1989	CHI	16	11	5–6	156	306	51.0	2,058	6.7	16	16	68.2	24	71	3.0	1
1990	CHI	16	2	1–1	39	104	37.5	521	5.0	3	5	43.8	12	41	3.4	2
1991	GB	12	7	2–5	128	238	53.8	1,490	6.3	11	9	72.6	17	93	5.5	1
1992	CLE	12	8	4–4	120	211	56.9	1,693	7.2	7	7	80.1	24	39	1.6	0
1993	PIT	7	1	0–1	29	54	53.7	398	7.4	2	5	51.3	5	-4	-0.8	0
1994	PIT	6	2	2–0	54	93	58.1	804	8.6	4	0	100.8	4	22	5.5	0
1995	PIT	7	4	2–2	65	113	57.5	666	5.9	1	9	44.3	11	25	2.3	0
1996	PIT	16	15	10–5	222	401	55.4	2,767	6.9	15	17	68.9	22	-7	0.3	0
1997	PIT	16	0	–	16	24	66.7	185	7.7	1	2	68.9	7	13	1.9	0
1998	PIT	16	0	–	21	30	70.0	204	6.8	2	2	83.2	0	0	0.0	0
1999	PIT	16	5	1–4	139	258	53.9	1,625	6.3	12	8	75.8	16	19	1.2	0
Career		185	73	42–31	1,248	2,337	53.4	16,079	6.9	88	106	68.9	198	526	2.7	9

== Coaching career ==
Tomczak was the offensive coordinator for the Pittsburgh Power of the Arena Football League (AFL) from 2010 to 2014.

Tomczak has served as a volunteer coach, with Youngstown State, since 2017.

== Personal life ==
Tomczak worked as a sports announcer in Pittsburgh, as well as a color commentator for ESPN college football games, before becoming a sports management agent. In 2001, he appeared on the sitcom Yes, Dear as himself. He served as a director at SMG Sports Management and has continued to work as a sports commentator. As of 2021, he served as a division leader at MRO Systems involving industrial maintenance in the area surrounding Youngstown.

His nephew Max is a wide receiver who attended Youngstown State.
