= Edmond Memorial High School =

- Main entrance

Location
- 1000 East 15th Street; Edmond, Oklahoma 73013; United States; 35°38′13″N 97°28′07″W

Information
- School type: State funded, Public high school
- Motto: Home of the Bulldogs
- Founded: 1917
- Status: Currently operational
- School board: Edmond Board
- School district: Edmond Public Schools
- School number: 55-I012-705
- CEEB code: 371185
- Principal: Keith Pautler
- Staff: 21
- Faculty: 136.56 (FTE)
- Enrollment: 2,668 (2023–2024)
- Average class size: Approximately 31
- Student to teacher ratio: 19.54
- Colors: Maroon and grey
- Sports: Baseball, basketball, football, golf, soccer, softball, cross country, swimming, tennis, track, volleyball, wrestling
- Mascot: Bulldog
- Nickname: EMHS
- Team name: Memorial Bulldogs
- Rival: Edmond North High School and Edmond Santa Fe High School
- Publication: Broken Barriers
- Newspaper: Ruff Draft
- Website: memorial.edmondschools.net

Edmond Memorial High School is a public secondary school located in Edmond, Oklahoma, one of three high schools in the Edmond school district. It serves approximately 2,300 students.

== History ==
The school was originally named Edmond High School because it was the only secondary school within the city limits. The first class graduated in 1922, and consisted of 24 students. As Edmond grew, the school changed location several times, moving to its current location on 15th Street in the mid-1960s. The current building was built in 1966 as a seventh grade only school. It opened to its first class of seventh graders the second semester of the 66–67 school year. At that point, Edmond High School was located at the corner of Ninth Street and Rankin. It housed all sophomores, juniors and seniors in Edmond. That building is now called Central Middle School and houses sixth, seventh and eighth graders from several elementary schools on the east side of Edmond. Also, it has lost its original, distinctive E shape due to new additions.

In 1975, the name of the school was changed to Edmond Memorial High School to honor six alumni who were killed while serving in Vietnam: Floyd Frazier, Jr., Allen Garrett, James Johnson, James Leonard, Danny Shores, and John Wilson. Because of its rapidly increasing size, in 1994 the school split into three, now rival schools, including Edmond North High School and Edmond Santa Fe High School.

On April 4, 1998, a pipe bomb was set off by 3 students, in an attempt to destroy the fiberglass bulldog in the foyer of the school. The bulldog, however, remained intact.

In the past decade, Memorial has undergone several new construction projects, including an expanded library, new parking lots, a new football locker room/pom and cheer practice facility, and a new freshmen academy. The auditorium has also been renovated.

== Statistics ==
For the 2023–2024 school year, the school had an enrollment of 2,388 students and 123.16 classroom teachers. The graduation rate for the class of 2017 was 98.9% percent. Memorial has over twenty teachers certified by the National Board for Professional Teaching Standards, who teach in every academic department.

== Awards and recognition ==
Memorial received the Department of Education Blue Ribbon School Award of Excellence in 2001–2002 school year, one of the highest honors an American high school can achieve. In 2008 Edmond Memorial was named the Siemens Foundation award winner for the state of Oklahoma for its consistently high Advanced Placement test scores in science, math and technology. The senior class of 2007 received more than $11 million in scholarship offers, and 60 percent of the class took AP classes. In the 2021-2022 school year, Memorial won the state championship for softball, Rocket League, and League of Legends. In 2022, Memorial won the state championship for volleyball and softball for the 2022-2023 school year.

== Notable alumni ==
- Paul Blair, former professional football player
- Allison Brown, Miss Teen USA 1986
- Scott Case, former NFL defensive back
- Kristian Doolittle, basketball player
- Micha Hancock, Olympic gold medalist and professional volleyball player.
- Johny Hendricks, mixed martial artist, former UFC Welterweight Champion
- Trey Kennedy, comedian and social media personality
- Kevin Meyer, award-winning filmmaker, director, and writer.
- Taylor Moore, PGA Tour Golfer
- Shaquille Morris, basketball player
- Marcus Nash, former NFL wide receiver
- Daniel Nayeri, author
- Sean Pedulla, professional basketball player for the Los Angeles Clippers
- Garrett Richards, Major League Baseball pitcher
- Bill Self, Hall of fame men's basketball coach at the University of Kansas
- Wes Sharon, Grammy-nominated album producer
- Paul Tatum, murdered expatriate businessman
- Jordan Woodard, professional basketball player
- James Woodard, professional basketball player
- David McComb, professional football player for the Miami RedHawks
