= Thomas Sanders (American football) =

American football player (born 1962)

No. 20, 45
- Position: Running back

Personal information
- Born: January 4, 1962 (age 64); Giddings, Texas, U.S.
- Listed height: 5 ft 11 in (1.80 m)
- Listed weight: 203 lb (92 kg)

Career information
- High school: Giddings
- College: Texas A&M
- NFL draft: 1985: 9th round, 250th overall pick

Career history
- Chicago Bears (1985–1989); San Diego Chargers (1990)*; Philadelphia Eagles (1990–1991)
- * Offseason or practice squad member only

Awards and highlights
- Super Bowl champion (XX)

Career NFL statistics
- Rushing yards: 1,239
- Rushing average: 3.9
- Rushing touchdowns: 12
- Stats at Pro Football Reference

Thomas Derrick Sanders (born January 4, 1962) is an American former professional football player who was a running back in the National Football League (NFL) for six seasons with the Chicago Bears and Philadelphia Eagles. He played college football for the Texas A&M Aggies and was selected by the Bears in the ninth round of the 1985 NFL draft with the 250th overall pick. He was a member of the Bears team that won Super Bowl XX following the 1985 NFL season. He was also a member of the "Shuffling Crew" in the video "The Super Bowl Shuffle".

== NFL career statistics ==
Legend
	Won the Super Bowl
**Bold**	Career high

=== Regular season ===
Year	Team	Games		Rushing					Receiving				
Year	Team	GP	GS	Att	Yds	Avg	Lng	TD	Rec	Yds	Avg	Lng	TD
1985	CHI	15	0	25	104	4.2	28	1	1	9	9.0	9	0
1986	CHI	16	1	27	224	**8.3**	**75**	**5**	2	18	9.0	18	0
1987	CHI	12	0	23	122	5.3	17	1	3	53	**17.7**	25	0
1988	CHI	16	0	**95**	**332**	3.5	20	3	**9**	**94**	10.4	**39**	0
1989	CHI	16	0	41	127	3.1	19	0	3	28	9.3	16	**1**
1990	PHI	10	0	56	208	3.7	39	1	2	20	10.0	12	0
1991	PHI	5	3	54	122	2.3	16	1	8	62	7.8	14	0
		90	4	321	1,239	3.9	75	12	28	284	10.1	39	1

=== Playoffs ===
Year	Team	Games		Rushing					Receiving				
Year	Team	GP	GS	Att	Yds	Avg	Lng	TD	Rec	Yds	Avg	Lng	TD
1985	CHI	3	0	4	15	3.8	7	0	0	0	0.0	0	0
1986	CHI	1	0	0	0	0.0	0	0	0	0	0.0	0	0
1987	CHI	1	0	2	4	2.0	3	0	1	2	2.0	2	0
1988	CHI	2	0	**15**	**116**	**7.7**	**58**	0	2	20	**10.0**	12	0
1990	PHI	1	0	2	12	6.0	8	0	**5**	**47**	9.4	**14**	0
		8	0	23	147	6.4	58	0	8	69	8.6	14	0
