= Matt Suhey =

American football player (1958–2026)

No. 26
- Position: Fullback

Personal information
- Born: July 7, 1958; Bellefonte, Pennsylvania, U.S.
- Died: September 6, 2026 (aged 68); Deerfield, Illinois, U.S.
- Listed height: 5 ft 11 in (1.80 m)
- Listed weight: 217 lb (98 kg)

Career information
- High school: State College Area (State College, Pennsylvania)
- College: Penn State (1976–1979)
- NFL draft: 1980: 2nd round, 46th overall pick

Career history
- Chicago Bears (1980–1989)

Awards and highlights
- Super Bowl champion (XX); 100 greatest Bears of All-Time; 2× First-team All-East (1978, 1979)

Career NFL statistics
- Rushing yards: 2,946
- Rushing average: 3.6
- Rushing touchdowns: 20
- Stats at Pro Football Reference

Matthew Jerome Suhey (July 7, 1958 – September 6, 2026) was an American professional football player who was a fullback for ten seasons in the National Football League (NFL) for the Chicago Bears. He played college football for the Penn State Nittany Lions. Suhey won a Super Bowl as a member of the 1985 Bears while scoring a touchdown in the game and was named to the Pennsylvania Football All-Century Team.

== Career ==
Before his NFL career, Suhey played college football at Pennsylvania State University from 1976 to 1979, rushing for 2,818 yards and 26 touchdowns, while also catching 39 passes for 328 yards and two touchdowns, along with 21 punt returns for 252 yards and another touchdown. Suhey scored the first touchdown for the Bears in the team's Super Bowl XX victory, carrying the ball in on an 11-yard run. He finished the game with 52 yards on 11 carries and one reception for 24 yards.

Suhey was the lead blocker and friend of Hall of Fame running back Walter Payton. He was also a close friend of the Payton family, and the executor of the Payton estate since the death of Walter. In a 24–3 victory over the Detroit Lions on November 10, 1985, Payton (107) and Suhey (102) both eclipsed the 100-yard mark, becoming the fourth Bears duo to ever accomplish the feat. (Note: Kyle Monangai and D'Andre Swift became the fifth in 2025. The duo repeated the feat in the 2026 season opener.)

Although Suhey was never a leader in any statistical category, he became a fan favorite for his personality and blocking ability. Suhey was ranked No. 78 on the Chicago Sun-Times list of the 100 Greatest Bears of All Time for the team's 100th season in 2019. A similar list compiled by the Bears in 2019 ranked him No. 70.

== Personal life and death ==
Born on July 7, 1958 in Bellefonte, Pennsylvania, Suhey was one of three sons of College Football Hall of Fame guard Steve Suhey to letter at Penn State University and a grandson of Hall of Fame Penn State player and coach Bob Higgins. His son, Joe Suhey, was a fullback at Penn State from 2007 to 2011. The Higgins–Suhey family is often referred to as the "first family of Penn State football" due to their affiliation with the program spanning four generations.

Suhey died at his home in Deerfield, Illinois, on September 6, 2026, at the age of 68.

== NFL career statistics ==
Legend
	Won the Super Bowl
**Bold**	Career high

=== Regular season ===
Year	Team	Games		Rushing					Receiving				
Year	Team	GP	GS	Att	Yds	Avg	Lng	TD	Rec	Yds	Avg	Lng	TD
1980	CHI	16	1	22	45	2.0	10	0	7	60	8.6	21	0
1981	CHI	15	14	**150**	521	3.5	26	3	33	168	5.1	15	0
1982	CHI	9	8	70	206	2.9	15	3	36	333	9.3	45	0
1983	CHI	16	13	149	**681**	**4.6**	**39**	**4**	**49**	**429**	8.8	52	1
1984	CHI	16	16	124	424	3.4	21	**4**	42	312	7.4	23	**2**
1985	CHI	16	16	115	471	4.1	17	1	33	295	8.9	35	1
1986	CHI	16	14	84	270	3.2	17	2	24	235	**9.8**	**58**	0
1987	CHI	12	2	7	24	3.4	6	0	7	54	7.7	12	0
1988	CHI	16	16	87	253	2.9	19	2	20	154	7.7	29	0
1989	CHI	16	0	20	51	2.6	8	1	9	73	8.1	22	1
Career		148	100	828	2,946	3.6	39	20	260	2,113	8.1	58	5

=== Playoffs ===
Year	Team	Games		Rushing					Receiving				
Year	Team	GP	GS	Att	Yds	Avg	Lng	TD	Rec	Yds	Avg	Lng	TD
1984	CHI	2	2	10	23	2.3	**15**	0	**5**	**44**	8.8	**33**	0
1985	CHI	3	3	**23**	**108**	**4.7**	11	**1**	4	36	**9.0**	24	0
1986	CHI	1	1	4	14	3.5	5	0	1	2	2.0	2	0
1987	CHI	1	1	4	8	2.0	5	0	1	6	6.0	6	0
1988	CHI	2	2	2	3	1.5	3	0	2	8	4.0	4	0
Career		9	9	43	156	3.6	15	1	13	96	7.4	33	0
