= Jack Cameron (American football) =

American football player (born 1963)

No. 30
- Position: Wide receiver

Personal information
- Born: November 5, 1961 (age 65); Roxboro, North Carolina, U.S.
- Listed height: 6 ft 0 in (1.83 m)
- Listed weight: 182 lb (83 kg)

Career information
- High school: Person
- College: Winston-Salem State

Career history
- Chicago Bears (1984)
- Stats at Pro Football Reference

Jack Lyndon Cameron (born November 5, 1961) is an American former professional football wide receiver who played for the Chicago Bears in the National Football League (NFL). He played college football at Winston-Salem State University.
