= Brad Anderson (American football) =

American football player (born 1961)

No. 86
- Position: Wide receiver

Personal information
- Born: January 12, 1961 (age 65); Glendale, Arizona, U.S.
- Listed height: 6 ft 2 in (1.88 m)
- Listed weight: 196 lb (89 kg)

Career information
- High school: Alhambra (Phoenix, Arizona)
- College: Arizona
- NFL draft: 1984: 8th round, 212th overall pick

Career history
- Chicago Bears (1984–1985)

Awards and highlights
- Super Bowl champion (XX); First-team All-Pac-10 (1983)

Career NFL statistics
- Receptions: 4
- Reception yards: 83
- Touchdowns: 1
- Stats at Pro Football Reference

Bradley Stewart Anderson (born January 12, 1961) is an American former professional football player who was a wide receiver in the National Football League (NFL). He played college football for the BYU Cougars and Arizona Wildcats. Anderson was selected by the Chicago Bears in the eighth round of the 1984 NFL draft with the 212th overall pick. He played two seasons for the Bears (1984–1985), and was part of the 1985 Bears team that won Super Bowl XX.
