= Jim McMahon =

American football player (born 1959)

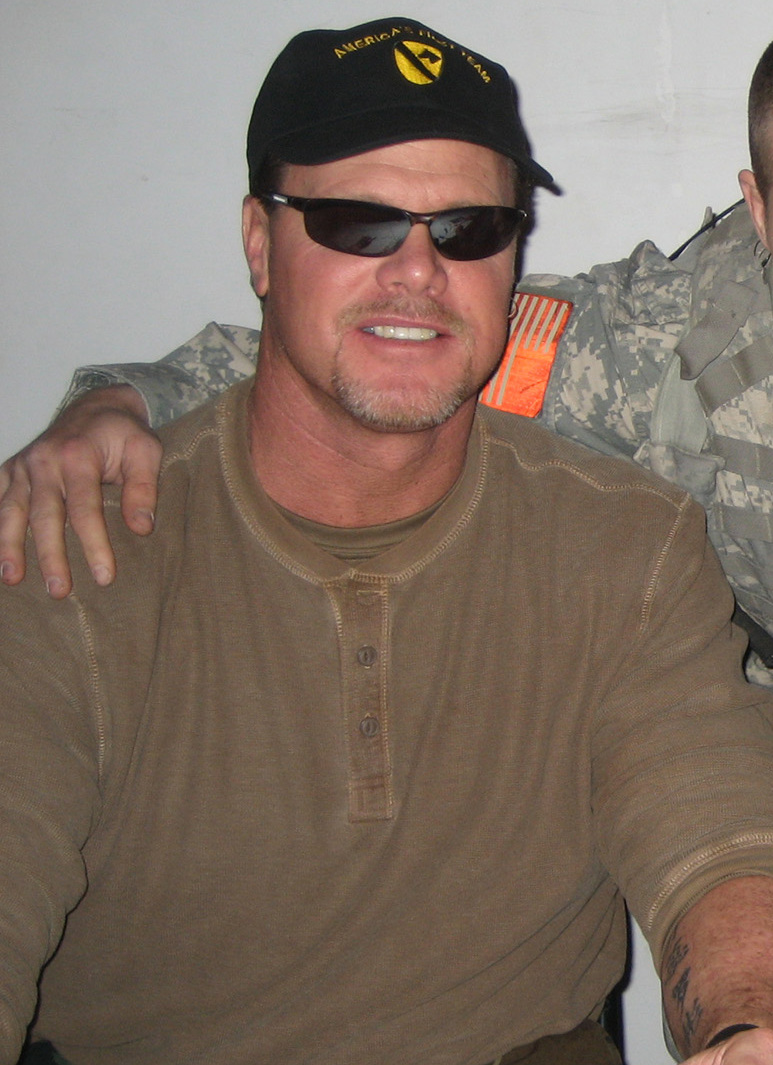
- McMahon in 2006

No. 9,10
- Position: Quarterback

Personal information
- Born: August 21, 1959 (age 67); Jersey City, New Jersey, U.S.
- Listed height: 6 ft 1 in (1.85 m)
- Listed weight: 195 lb (88 kg)

Career information
- High school: Roy (Roy, Utah)
- College: BYU (1977–1981)
- NFL draft: 1982: 1st round, 5th overall pick

Career history
- Chicago Bears (1982–1988); San Diego Chargers (1989); Philadelphia Eagles (1990–1992); Minnesota Vikings (1993); Arizona Cardinals (1994); Cleveland Browns (1995)*; Green Bay Packers (1995–1996)
- * Offseason or practice squad member only

Awards and highlights
- 2× Super Bowl champion (XX, XXXI); NFC Offensive Rookie of the Year (1982); NFL Comeback Player of the Year (1991); Pro Bowl (1985); 100 greatest Bears of All-Time; Davey O'Brien Award (1981); Sammy Baugh Trophy (1981); Unanimous All-American (1981); First-team All-American (1980); NCAA passing yards leader (1980); NCAA passing touchdowns leader (1980); 2× NCAA passer rating leader (1980, 1981); NCAA completion percentage leader (1981); 3× WAC Offensive Player of the Year (1978, 1980, 1981); First-team All-WAC (1981); BYU Cougars No. 9 retired

Career NFL statistics
- Passing attempts: 2,573
- Passing completions: 1,492
- Completion percentage: 58.0%
- TD–INT: 100–90
- Passing yards: 18,148
- Passer rating: 78.2
- Rushing yards: 1,631
- Rushing touchdowns: 16
- Stats at Pro Football Reference
- College Football Hall of Fame

James Robert McMahon Jr. (born August 21, 1959) is an American former professional football quarterback who played in the National Football League (NFL) for 15 seasons, most notably with the Chicago Bears. He played college football for the BYU Cougars, earning first-team All-American honors in 1980 after leading the NCAA in passing yards and passing touchdowns. The following year, McMahon won the Davey O'Brien Award and the Sammy Baugh Trophy and was named a unanimous All-American. He was selected by the Bears fifth overall in the 1982 NFL draft. In 1998 McMahon was inducted into the College Football Hall of Fame.

McMahon achieved his greatest professional success with the 1985 Bears team that won the franchise's first Super Bowl title in Super Bowl XX. He also received Pro Bowl honors during the season. However, after suffering a rotator cuff injury the following season, McMahon struggled with injuries throughout the rest of his career. Following his seven years in Chicago, McMahon played for the San Diego Chargers, Philadelphia Eagles, Minnesota Vikings, Arizona Cardinals, and Green Bay Packers. McMahon spent his final seasons in a backup role, including on the Packers team that won Super Bowl XXXI. He was inducted into the College Football Hall of Fame in 1998.

== Early life ==
McMahon was born in Jersey City, New Jersey. He was raised Catholic. He moved with his family to San Jose, California, when he was three. Growing up, McMahon played all sports in his neighborhood, encouraged by his parents. "We told him to believe he was the best," his mother said. "If he didn't, nobody else would."

McMahon played high school football his freshman and sophomore years at Andrew Hill High School, then moved with his family in the summer of 1975 to Roy, Utah, where he played his junior and senior years at Roy High School and graduated in 1977.

== College career ==
McMahon enrolled at Brigham Young University (BYU) and played college football for the Cougars. He was their punter during his freshman season. He also played baseball, but he played enough at quarterback to throw his first-ever collegiate touchdown pass against UTEP. He continued as the Cougars' punter as the 1978 season began, but when Marc Wilson was injured in the third game of the season (against Colorado State), McMahon became the starting quarterback. McMahon led BYU to victory against Colorado State, accounting for 112 passing yards, 80 rushing yards, and two touchdowns. He was named Chevrolet Player of the Game and Western Athletic Conference (WAC) Player of the Week for his performance. McMahon and Wilson shared quarterback duties for the rest of the season; McMahon played well enough to earn All-WAC and Associated Press honorable mention All-American honors. The best game of his sophomore year was against Wyoming: he passed for 317 yards and rushed for 49 more yards, earning another WAC Player of the Week award.

McMahon suffered a knee injury towards the end of the 1978 season and BYU coaches chose to redshirt him in 1979. McMahon watched from the sidelines as Wilson set nine NCAA records, tied two others, and became the first BYU player to earn consensus first-team All-American honors; he finished third in Heisman Trophy balloting.

With Wilson graduated and in the NFL with the Oakland Raiders, McMahon beat out Royce Bybee to claim the starting quarterback position in 1980. BYU lost the opener 25–21 against New Mexico, but then won eleven straight to claim the WAC championship. McMahon set 32 NCAA records, including single-season records for yards of total offense (4,627), passing yards (4,571), touchdown passes (47), and passing efficiency (176.9). His best game was against Utah State; he completed 21 of 33 passes for 485 yards and six touchdowns, and added two rushing touchdowns. That performance earned him Sports Illustrated's National Player of the Week award. McMahon's season statistics might have been even better, but he spent significant time on the sidelines because the Cougars won many games by wide margins. Although he started all 12 regular-season games, he only finished three of them.

BYU led the nation in passing offense, total offense, and scoring offense during the regular season. McMahon earned numerous awards for his individual accomplishments, being named WAC Player of the Year, unanimous First-team All-WAC, Utah Sportsman of the Year, and Deseret News Athlete of the Year. He was named to four All-American teams and finished fifth in Heisman Trophy voting.

In the Holiday Bowl, the Cougars faced an SMU team led by star running backs Craig James and Eric Dickerson, and the Mustangs built a 45–25 lead over BYU with just four minutes left in the game. As Cougar fans headed for the exits, McMahon screamed that the game was not over yet. He promptly guided BYU's offense to three quick touchdowns, including a 41-yard Hail Mary pass to Clay Brown to win the game as time expired. It is regarded as one of the greatest comebacks in college football history; BYU fans refer to it as the "Miracle Bowl".

In McMahon's senior season in 1981, despite missing two games due to injuries, he passed for 3,555 yards and 30 touchdowns in the regular season, again leading BYU to a WAC championship. For his efforts, he was named WAC Player of the Year and unanimous First-team All-WAC. On a national level, he was named First-team All-American by five different organizations and finished third in Heisman Trophy balloting. He received the Davey O'Brien Trophy and the Sammy Baugh Award, and he shared the Pigskin Club NCAA Offensive Player of the Year award with USC's Marcus Allen. He earned Sports Illustrated's Player of the Week award after his performance against Colorado State, in which he tied a school record with seven touchdown passes.

In his last game as a Cougar, McMahon passed for 342 yards and 3 touchdowns in BYU's victory over Washington State in the 1981 Holiday Bowl. His career totals were 9,536 passing yards and 84 touchdown passes (not including bowl games). McMahon left college with 70 NCAA records and tied for one other. He entered the College Football Hall of Fame in 1999.

In September 2010, McMahon announced he would complete his coursework at BYU, which would qualify him for induction into the Brigham Young University Athletics Hall of Fame. On October 2, 2014, after completing his degree in communications, McMahon was inducted into the BYU Athletics Hall of Fame as part of the 2014 class. BYU honored McMahon by retiring his No. 9 jersey during a halftime ceremony at the BYU vs. Utah State football game on Friday, October 3, 2014.

== Professional career ==
=== Chicago Bears ===
The Chicago Bears selected McMahon in the first round (fifth overall) of the 1982 NFL draft. McMahon, thrilled to be free from what he considered a restrictive culture at BYU, strolled into his first public function with the Bears holding a cold beer in his hand. Head coach Mike Ditka was not impressed, nor was Bears owner and founder George Halas. McMahon was to find the atmosphere in Chicago almost as challenging as that at Brigham Young, and he would lock horns with Ditka routinely during his seven years with the Bears.

McMahon won the Bears' starting quarterback job as a rookie in 1982, and was named to several All-Rookie teams when he nearly led the team to the playoffs, despite the NFL only playing two games before a players' strike that cancelled nearly half the season. McMahon quickly displayed a natural ability to read defenses and an athletic versatility that surprised many.

McMahon, a rollout passer, explained that coaching in his youth had taught him to square his shoulders to the direction he wanted to throw the football, and he was thus able to execute passes with tight spirals and a high degree of accuracy when running to either his left or his right. The Bears finished the strike-shortened season at 3–6, and McMahon was named NFC Offensive Rookie of the Year, losing the league-wide honor to Marcus Allen.

In 1983, McMahon continued to improve as a passer and as a field general. He made a habit of changing the play both in the huddle and at the line of scrimmage, a practice which frustrated Ditka but usually led to success. His knowledge of the game and an instinctive, intuitive grasp of in-game situations were significant. He became a frequent scorer in goal-line situations, after the dying Halas instructed Ditka to make the quarterback sneak a bigger part of the Bears' offense. He also began to catch touchdown passes on option plays, and was the emergency punter. Chicago finished the season at 8–8, missing the division title and a playoff berth by one victory.

In 1984, the Bears broke through, reaching the conference title game before losing to the San Francisco 49ers. McMahon started the season strongly, though nursing minor injuries like those that would plague him throughout his career. In a violent game against the Los Angeles Raiders at Soldier Field, McMahon sustained a season-ending injury when he was brutally tackled by two Los Angeles defenders. He suffered bruised ribs and a lacerated kidney on the play, but limped to the huddle and breathlessly called the next play, despite difficulty breathing and increasing pain. The players could barely hear him in the huddle, and when McMahon attempted an audible at the line of scrimmage the Bears receivers were unable to hear his call. McMahon was on the verge of collapsing on the field, clutching his flank and rasping in his attempts to convey his situation. The offensive linemen helped McMahon stand and leave the field. McMahon went to the locker room, and reported urine that "looked like grape juice".

==== 1985 ====
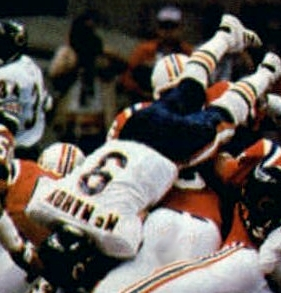
McMahon dives into the end zone to score a touchdown for the Chicago Bears during Super Bowl XX

The 1985 Chicago Bears' visit to the White House in 2011.

In 1985, the Bears had a tremendous season, later voted by Sports Illustrated magazine as the greatest of all time, winning their first 12 games and finishing at 15–1. McMahon became a media darling, not only for his outstanding play on the field, but also for his personality. He appeared in a rap record made by the team, "The Super Bowl Shuffle", in which he proclaimed, "I'm the punky QB known as McMahon." In an early-season Monday night game at Minnesota, McMahon was slated to back up Steve Fuller, as McMahon had missed practice time earlier in the week due to a neck injury that required an overnight hospital stay. Midway into the third quarter, the Vikings held a 17–9 lead. McMahon lobbied to get into the game until well into the third quarter. Once finally on the field, his first play was an opportunistic 70-yard touchdown pass to Willie Gault. After an interception by Wilber Marshall on the Vikings ensuing possession, McMahon's very next offensive play was a 25-yard touchdown pass to Dennis McKinnon, making him 2–2 for 95 yards and two touchdowns. He followed up with another successful offensive drive, including a crucial third and short sneak to set up another 43-yard touchdown pass to McKinnon. The Bears led 30–17 and went on to win the game 33–24.

McMahon played solidly, throwing for career-highs of 15 touchdowns and 2,392 yards in 13 games and running well (5.4 yards per carry, three rushing touchdowns).

McMahon was notorious for head-first baseball-style slides when running the football, despite being coached to slide feet-first to protect his body. In the playoffs, McMahon heeded this coaching advice and was speared by a defender's helmet squarely in his buttocks, causing a painful deep bruise for which McMahon sought acupuncture treatment. This led to a point of controversy before the Super Bowl in New Orleans, when McMahon "mooned" journalists who were inquiring as to the status of the injury. Thursday morning before the big-game, McMahon made more headlines when a local television station reported that he had called women of New Orleans "sluts", an accusation he denied and which the announcer later admitted was made up. McMahon claimed in an interview, that he received death threats and wore a different jersey number during practice.

He ended the season with a strong performance in Super Bowl XX, which the Bears won 46–10 over the New England Patriots. In that game, McMahon became the first quarterback in the history of the Super Bowl to rush for two touchdowns. McMahon earned a spot in his only Pro Bowl.

==== 1986–1988 ====
In week 12 of the 1986 NFL regular season, McMahon was playing against the Green Bay Packers, while dealing with an existing rotator cuff injury to his right shoulder. After throwing a third down interception and at least two seconds after his pass was thrown, Green Bay nose tackle Charles Martin grabbed McMahon from behind and body-slammed him to the turf, exacerbating his existing rotator cuff injury. McMahon briefly returned to the game, but it soon became apparent that he couldn't throw effectively, and he left the game in the third quarter, never to play again in 1986. Martin was immediately ejected from the game and later suspended for two additional games — the first multi-game suspension for an on-field incident in modern NFL history. Without McMahon, and despite finishing tied for the league's best record at 14–2, the Bears were unable to defend their Super Bowl championship and lost in the Divisional Playoff round to the Washington Redskins.

McMahon battled injuries for the rest of his career, although at one point between the 1984 and 1987 seasons, he won 22 consecutive regular-season (25 including playoffs and the Super Bowl) starts, the longest "regular season winning streak" by an NFL quarterback at the time, now held by Peyton Manning, who won 23 in 2008 to 2009 (but lost a wildcard playoff game to the Chargers during his "winning streak").

In 1987, McMahon came right back from a head injury and brought the Bears back in the first game following the NFL players strike to defeat the Buccaneers, 27–26. The Bears went on to an 11–4 record, with many expecting McMahon to start and lead the Bears back to the Super Bowl. However, 1987 ended exactly the same way 1986 had, with the Bears being eliminated by the eventual Super Bowl champion Redskins.

McMahon returned for the 1988 season with a much more serious attitude. His main offensive weapon in Walter Payton had retired and McMahon publicly expressed his desire to win a Super Bowl again. The Bears looked strong all season and went 12–4, again winning the NFC Central, and finishing with the NFC's top seed, ensuring they would host the NFC Championship Game at Soldier Field if they advanced that far. McMahon was unable to get the Bears back to the Super Bowl, as they were routed by the eventual Super Bowl champion San Francisco 49ers in the NFC Championship which saw McMahon benched in favor of Mike Tomczak in the fourth quarter.

During the offseason, McMahon and Bears president Michael McCaskey had a major falling out. He also fell out of favor with head coach Mike Ditka, and after spending his first seven seasons in the league with Chicago, McMahon was traded to the San Diego Chargers.

As of 2017's NFL off-season, McMahon held at least 15 Bears franchise records, including:

- Completions: playoffs (70)
- Passing Yards: playoffs (967), playoff season (636 in 1985)
- Passing TDs: playoffs (4), playoff season (3 in 1985; with Rex Grossman), playoff game (2 on 1986-01-05 NYG; with Steve Walsh and Jay Cutler), rookie season (9 in 1982; with Kyle Orton)
- Passer Rating: playoffs (77.1), playoff season (106.6 in 1985), rookie season (79.9 in 1982)
- Sacked: playoffs (10), rookie game (7 on 1982-11-28 @MIN)
- Yds/Pass Att: playoffs (7.61), playoff season (9.64 in 1985)
- Pass Yds/Game: rookie season (187.6 in 1982)

=== San Diego Chargers ===
McMahon started 11 games for the 6–10 Chargers team in 1989. He went 4–7 in the games he started, though the team lost four of those games by a combined 11 points. He had only 4 games over 200 yards, but had 389 yards against the Houston Oilers in a Week 2 loss.

However, McMahon again found himself in trouble when he fell out of favor with his coach, Dan Henning, his teammates, and the team's front office staff. He was benched for the final four games in favor of Billy Joe Tolliver and finished the year with 2,132 yards, 10 touchdowns and 10 interceptions. McMahon was released after the season.

=== Later career ===
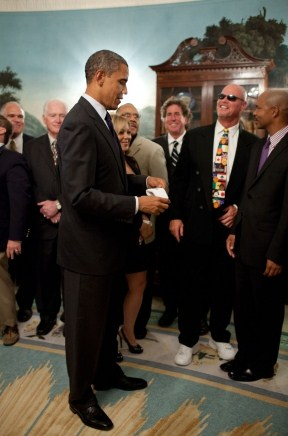
McMahon at the White House with President Obama in 2011

McMahon signed with the Philadelphia Eagles, who were coached by former Bears assistant Buddy Ryan, for the 1990 season. For the first time in his career he served as a full-time backup, as Randall Cunningham was entrenched as the starter. After Cunningham tore his ACL in the opening game of the following season, new coach Rich Kotite named McMahon his starter. He helped the Eagles to a 10–6 record and earned the NFL Comeback Player of the Year award. McMahon stayed with the Eagles for one additional season in the backup role.

McMahon's last chance to be a full-time starter came with the Minnesota Vikings in 1993. Supplanting Sean Salisbury as the team's starter, McMahon led the Vikings to eight wins in twelve starts and returned to the postseason as a starter for the first time since 1988. However, the Vikings lost to the New York Giants.

After the season, McMahon joined the Arizona Cardinals, now coached by Ryan, for the 1994 season, where he made his final career start in Week 3, against the Cleveland Browns. He finished the season as the team's third quarterback behind Steve Beuerlein and Jay Schroeder and left the team at its conclusion. McMahon made the Cleveland Browns in the 1995 preseason but did not play a down with them, McMahon later in the season joined the Green Bay Packers. He retired following the 1996 season, which finished with a Super Bowl victory over the New England Patriots in New Orleans, eleven years to the day of the Bears' Super Bowl victory over the Patriots in the same venue.

McMahon caused some controversy when he showed up to the Packers' reception at the White House wearing his Bears jersey, due to the rivalry between the two teams. McMahon later explained that he did so because he was unable to visit the White House when he led the Bears to victory in Super Bowl XX; two days after the Bears won the game, the crew of Space Shuttle mission STS-51-L were killed in the explosion of their craft, Shuttle Challenger, and the Bears' scheduled visit was cancelled. McMahon and his surviving teammates and coaches were eventually received in 2011 by President Barack Obama, himself a Bears fan.

== Post-retirement ==
=== Legal troubles ===
In November 2003, McMahon was apprehended in Navarre, Florida for driving under the influence. "One breathalyzer exam put McMahon's blood-alcohol level at 0.261 percent, another put it at 0.258 percent. The legal limit in Florida is 0.08 percent," the Associated Press reported. "During a sobriety test, Mr. McMahon looked at the officer and said, 'I'm too drunk. You got me,'" a Santa Rosa County, Florida sheriff spokesperson said.

On April 9, 2012, it was reported that McMahon was targeted by the Federal Deposit Insurance Corporation (FDIC) for $104 million in bad loans made by Chicago-based Broadway Bank, where McMahon was a member of the board. The FDIC sought to recover $104 million in loans made by the bank before it was shut down. In addition to McMahon, six other former Broadway Bank board members and two former bank executives were targeted. McMahon approved only one of the 17 bad loans, which was used for the purchase of a $28 million Miami Beach condominium project. The FDIC said the bank lost $19.5 million on the loan. McMahon said in a statement that the FDIC's claims were without merit and he expected to be vindicated. "I am proud to have served as an outside, independent director for a brief part of the bank's history," he wrote, according to the Sun-Times. In 2016, the FDIC settled its lawsuit against the bank with a $5 million settlement.

=== Concussions ===
In a November 6, 2010 interview, McMahon admitted to having memory problems due to injuries suffered on the football field. McMahon was quoted as saying, "There are a lot of times when I walk into a room and forget why I walked in there."

Along with six other retired professional football players, McMahon filed a class action lawsuit against the NFL in August 2011, citing the league's negligence and misconduct in its handling of concussion-related injuries. It followed lawsuits filed shortly before by 75 other NFL retirees making similar claims in addition to asserting that the NFL knew about the dangers concussions posed to its athletes as far back as the 1920s and actively withheld the information from the affected and the general public until summer of 2010. The August suit that McMahon joined seeks to expand the scope of the suit to potentially all NFL players who suffered game-related concussions or head injuries.

On September 27, 2012, it was reported that, at age 53, McMahon had been diagnosed as being in the early stages of dementia.

In 2017, McMahon told longtime San Francisco Chronicle columnist Scott Ostler that his mental condition had improved following chiropractic care for his neck. McMahon expressed skepticism toward the effectiveness of NFL-sanctioned treatments for head and neck injuries, believing that NFL officials prioritize corporate interests over player well-being.

=== Medical cannabis ===
McMahon uses cannabis to treat the chronic pain and arthritis that he has as a result of his football career. He has called cannabis a "godsend" that allowed him to eliminate his painkiller habit, which he says included 100 Percocet pills a month.

McMahon has been active in speaking about his experience using cannabis, serving as spokesperson for the Cannabis Sports Policy Project and a member of the Gridiron Cannabis Coalition along with several other former NFL players. McMahon appeared in a TV ad supporting a ballot measure to legalize cannabis in Arizona.

In November 2016, McMahon was among the signatories of an open letter addressed to the NFL, urging a change in the league's policy towards cannabis. The letter was penned by Doctors for Cannabis Regulation and signed by several other NFL players. McMahon is also a member of the Doctors for Cannabis Regulation NFL steering committee.

=== Other activities ===
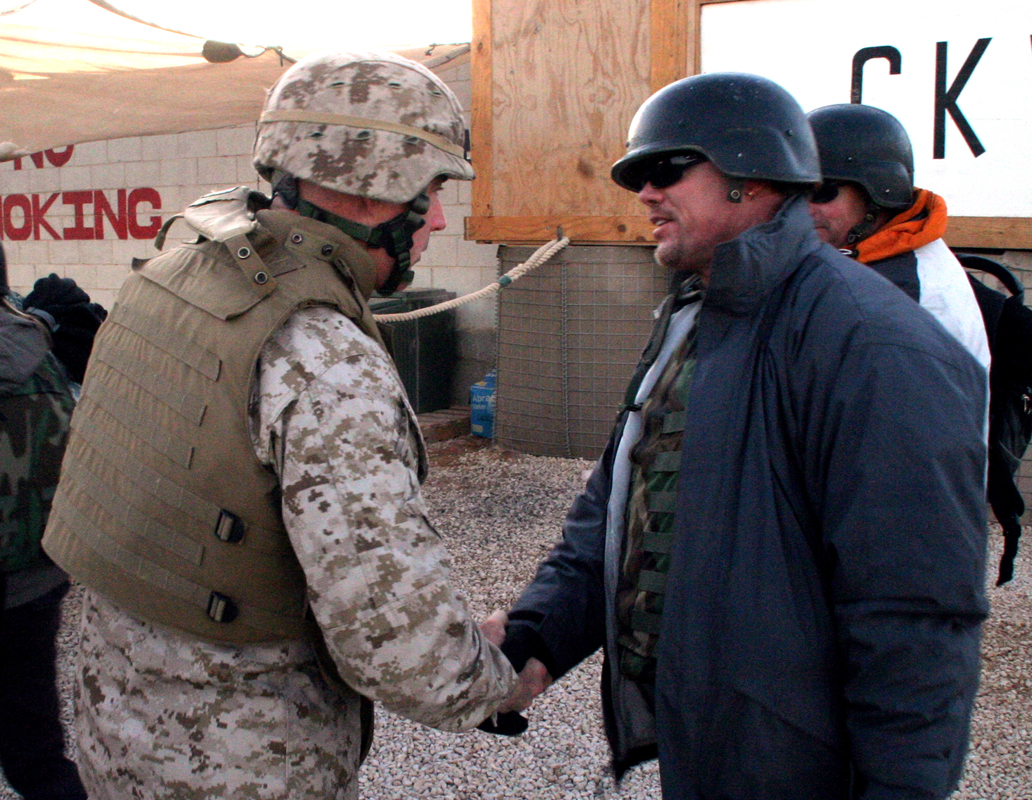
McMahon being greeted by the Commanding Officer of the 15th Marine Expeditionary Unit during his USO tour in Iraq in December 2006

In December 2006, McMahon went to Iraq with the USO to visit American forces in the field.

During Super Bowl XLIV, McMahon joined other members of the 1985 Chicago Bears in resurrecting the Super Bowl Shuffle in a Boost Mobile commercial.

In 2010, McMahon became a part owner of the Indoor Football League's Chicago Slaughter.

In November 2012, McMahon appeared on an episode of the sitcom The League called "The Tailgate."

In August 2020, a documentary entitled Mad Mac: The Memory of Jim McMahon by director CJ Wallis began shooting. The film covers McMahon's life in and out of professional sports.

== Legacy ==
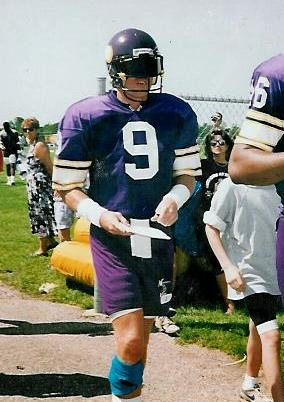
McMahon wearing a tinted visor during his stint with the Minnesota Vikings in 1993

Throughout his career, McMahon was known for both on- and off-field antics. His wearing of a headband while on the sidelines led to him being fined by then NFL commissioner, Pete Rozelle, since the headband had an unauthorized Adidas corporate logo on it. The next week, his headband simply said "Rozelle". The commissioner later admitted in a letter to McMahon that the headband with Rozelle's name was "funny as hell", but declined to rescind the $5,000 fine. Prior to Super Bowl XX, hundreds of fans mailed McMahon headbands in hopes he would wear them during the game; Rozelle warned the quarterback not to wear anything "unacceptable".

In response, McMahon decided to help bring attention to Juvenile diabetes by wearing a headband simply stating "JDF Cure", before switching to one stating "POW-MIA", and finally one with the word "Pluto", the nickname of his close friend and favorite collegiate receiving target, former BYU wide receiver Danny Plater, who was afflicted with a brain tumor.

McMahon is known for his trademark sunglasses, which he wears for medical reasons. At age six, while trying to untie a knot in a toy gun holster with a fork, he accidentally severed the cornea in his right eye when the fork slipped. While his vision was saved, the accident left that eye extremely sensitive to light. On the field, he was among the first to wear a helmet fitted with a tinted plastic visor covering the eyes, leading to nicknames like "Darth Vader".

== NFL career statistics ==
Legend
	Won the Super Bowl
**Bold**	Career high

=== Regular season ===
Year	Team	Games			Passing								Sacks	
Year	Team	GP	GS	Record	Cmp	Att	Pct	Yds	Avg	TD	Int	Rtg	Sck	SckY
1982	CHI	8	7	3–4	120	210	57.1	1,501	7.2	9	7	79.9	27	196
1983	CHI	14	13	7–6	175	295	59.3	2,184	7.4	12	**13**	77.6	**42**	**266**
1984	CHI	9	9	7–2	85	143	59.4	1,146	8.0	8	2	97.8	10	48
1985	CHI	13	11	**11–0**	178	313	56.9	**2,392**	7.6	**15**	11	82.6	26	125
1986	CHI	6	6	6–0	77	150	51.3	995	6.6	5	8	61.4	6	40
1987	CHI	7	6	5–1	125	210	59.5	1,639	7.8	12	8	87.4	22	136
1988	CHI	9	9	7–2	114	192	59.4	1,346	7.0	6	7	76.0	13	79
1989	SD	12	11	4–7	176	318	55.3	2,132	6.7	10	10	73.5	28	167
1990	PHI	5	0	—	6	9	66.7	63	7.0	0	0	86.8	1	7
1991	PHI	12	11	8–3	187	311	60.1	2,239	7.2	12	11	80.3	21	128
1992	PHI	4	1	1–0	22	43	51.2	279	6.5	1	2	60.1	4	25
1993	MIN	12	12	8–4	**200**	**331**	60.4	1,968	6.0	9	8	76.2	23	104
1994	ARI	2	1	0–1	23	43	53.5	219	5.1	1	3	46.6	3	23
1995	GB	1	0	—	1	1	100.0	6	6.0	0	0	91.7	0	0
1996	GB	5	0	—	3	4	75.0	39	9.8	0	0	105.2	0	0
Career		129	97	67–30	1,492	2,573	58.0	18,148	7.1	100	90	78.2	226	1,344

== Personal life ==
McMahon met Nancy Daines at BYU, and the couple married in 1982 after four years of dating. They had four children together and divorced in 2009. A 2012 Sports Illustrated article stated that he was in a relationship with Laurie Navon.

== See also ==
- List of NCAA major college football yearly passing leaders
- List of NCAA major college football yearly total offense leaders
- Living former players diagnosed with or reporting symptoms of chronic traumatic encephalopathy
