= Mitch Krenk =

American football player (born 1959)

No. 89
- Position: Tight end

Personal information
- Born: November 19, 1959 (age 66); Crete, Nebraska, U.S.
- Listed height: 6 ft 2 in (1.88 m)
- Listed weight: 225 lb (102 kg)

Career information
- High school: Nebraska City (Nebraska City, Nebraska)
- College: Nebraska
- NFL draft: 1983: undrafted

Career history
- Seattle Seahawks (1983)*; Dallas Cowboys (1984)*; Chicago Bears (1984–1985)
- * Offseason or practice squad member only
- Stats at Pro Football Reference

Mitchell James Krenk (born November 19, 1959) is an American former professional football player who was a tight end for the Chicago Bears of the National Football League (NFL). He earned a Super Bowl ring while spending the 1985 Bears season on injured reserve.

He played college football for the Nebraska Cornhuskers.
