= Troy Johnson (linebacker) =

Profile
- Position: Linebacker

Personal information
- Born: November 10, 1964 (age 61); Houston, Texas, U.S.
- Listed height: 6 ft 2 in (1.88 m)
- Listed weight: 236 lb (107 kg)

Career information
- High school: Alief Hastings (Houston, Texas)
- College: Oklahoma (1984–1987)
- NFL draft: 1988: 5th round, 133rd overall pick

Career history
- Chicago Bears (1988–1989); New York Jets (1990–1991); Detroit Lions (1992)

Troy Antwain Johnson (born November 10, 1964) is an American former professional football linebacker. He played college football for the Oklahoma Sooners and was selected by the Chicago Bears in the fifth round of the 1988 NFL draft. He played five seasons in the National Football League (NFL) for the Chicago Bears, New York Jets and Detroit Lions.
