= Dave Duerson =

American football player (1960–2011)

No. 22, 26
- Position: Safety

Personal information
- Born: November 28, 1960; Muncie, Indiana, U.S.
- Died: February 17, 2011 (aged 50); Sunny Isles Beach, Florida, U.S.
- Listed height: 6 ft 1 in (1.85 m)
- Listed weight: 207 lb (94 kg)

Career information
- High school: Muncie Northside
- College: Notre Dame
- NFL draft: 1983: 3rd round, 64th overall pick

Career history
- Chicago Bears (1983–1989); New York Giants (1990); Phoenix Cardinals (1991–1993)

Awards and highlights
- 2× Super Bowl champion (XX, XXV); NFL Man of the Year (1987); 2× Second-team All-Pro (1986, 1987); 4× Pro Bowl (1985–1988); 100 greatest Bears of All-Time; First-team All-American (1982)

Career NFL statistics
- Interceptions: 20
- Interception yards: 226
- Sacks: 16
- Stats at Pro Football Reference

David Russell Duerson (November 28, 1960 – February 17, 2011) was an American professional football safety who played in the National Football League (NFL) for 11 seasons, primarily with the Chicago Bears. He played college football for the Notre Dame Fighting Irish and was selected by the Bears in the third round of the 1983 NFL draft.

During his seven seasons with the Bears, Duerson received four consecutive Pro Bowl and two consecutive second-team All-Pro selections. Duerson was also a member of the 1985 team that won the franchise's first Super Bowl title in Super Bowl XX. He later spent one season with the New York Giants, winning Super Bowl XXV, and his final three with the Phoenix Cardinals.

Following his retirement, Duerson committed suicide in 2011. Duerson was posthumously diagnosed chronic traumatic encephalopathy (CTE) as a result of the concussions he had during his playing career.

== Early life ==
Born and raised in Muncie, Indiana, Duerson played football, basketball, and baseball at Northside High School. Duerson's honors during his high school years included the 1979 Indiana Mr. Football.

== College career ==
Duerson played college football at the University of Notre Dame from 1979 to 1982, and graduated with honors, with a BA in economics. He started all four years for the Fighting Irish, and earned recognition as an All-American in 1981 and 1982. Duerson was a captain and the team's MVP as a senior in 1982, intercepting seven passes and returning them for 104 yards. He finished his college career with 12 interceptions, which he returned for 256 yards and a touchdown. He also returned 103 punts for 869 yards and 3 kickoffs for 75.

He was the winner of the Edward "Moose" Krause Distinguished Service Award in 1990 by the Notre Dame Monogram Club, of which he was a past president. He was also a member of the University of Notre Dame Board of Trustees from 2001 to 2005.

== Professional career ==
Taken in the third round of the 1983 NFL draft by the Chicago Bears, Duerson was selected to four consecutive Pro Bowls (1986–1989). He won two Super Bowl championship rings, with the 1985 Bears (XX), and 1990 Giants (XXV). During the 1986 season, Duerson set an NFL record that stood for 19 years (Adrian Wilson, 2005) for most sacks in a season by a defensive back, with seven. He also intercepted six passes for 139 yards with a longest return of 38 yards. At season's end, Duerson was named first-team All-Pro by Pro Football Weekly, the Pro Football Writers Association and The Sporting News and second-team All-Pro by the Associated Press. In 1987, Duerson was the recipient of the NFL Man of the Year Award. In his 11 seasons, Duerson recorded 20 interceptions, which he returned for 226 yards, and 16 quarterback sacks. He also recovered five fumbles, returning them for 47 yards and a touchdown.

== After football ==
Duerson owned three McDonald's restaurants in Louisville, Kentucky for six months, from late 1994 to April 1995. He purchased the majority interest in Fair Oaks Farms (formerly Brooks Sausage Company) in 1995. He sold his stake in the company in 2002 and started Duerson Foods, but that company was forced into receivership in 2006 and most of its assets were auctioned off.

== Death ==
Duerson was found dead at his Sunny Isles Beach, Florida home on February 17, 2011. The Miami-Dade County medical examiner reported that Duerson died of a self-inflicted gunshot wound to the chest. He sent a text message to his family saying he wanted his brain to be used for research at the Boston University School of Medicine, which is conducting research into chronic traumatic encephalopathy (CTE), a neurodegenerative disease, which can be caused by playing football. He left behind three sons and a daughter from his marriage to ex-wife Alicia. He was buried in the Cedar Grove Cemetery in Notre Dame, Indiana.

On May 2, 2011, neurologists at Boston University confirmed that Duerson had CTE, which is caused by repeated hits to the head. He was one of at least 345 NFL players to be diagnosed after death with this disease.

== In popular media ==
Duerson was portrayed by actor Adewale Akinnuoye-Agbaje in the 2015 film Concussion. Duerson's family was displeased with how he was portrayed. Duerson was also mentioned in the HBO series Ballers in reference to CTE with character Ricky Jerret.

== See also ==
- List of suicides (A–M)
- List of NFL players with chronic traumatic encephalopathy
