= Paul Blair (American football, born 1963) =

American football player (born 1963)

No. 68
- Position: Offensive tackle

Personal information
- Born: March 8, 1963 (age 63); Edmond, Oklahoma, U.S.
- Listed height: 6 ft 4 in (1.93 m)
- Listed weight: 295 lb (134 kg)

Career information
- High school: Edmond Memorial (OK)
- College: Oklahoma State
- NFL draft: 1986: 4th round, 110th overall pick

Career history
- Chicago Bears (1986–1988); Denver Broncos (1989)*; Minnesota Vikings (1989–1990)
- * Offseason or practice squad member only

Awards and highlights
- 2× First-team All-Big Eight (1984, 1985)

Career NFL statistics
- Games played: 26
- Games started: 2
- Stats at Pro Football Reference

Paul Kevin Blair (born March 8, 1963) is an American Christian pastor and former professional football player who played as an offensive tackle in the National Football League (NFL) from 1986 to 1990. Born in Edmond, Oklahoma, he attended Edmond Memorial High School and Oklahoma State University, before being selected by the Chicago Bears in the fourth round of the 1986 NFL draft. He played in 14 games in his rookie season for the defending Super Bowl champions, as the team went 14–2 and reached the playoffs for a third season in a row. He played 11 more times the following season, including the only postseason appearance of his career against the Washington Redskins, but did not play in 1988 and left for the Denver Broncos in 1989; however, he did not play that season either, and joined the Minnesota Vikings for the 1990 season. There he played in just two games before a knee injury forced him to retire from football.

After his retirement, Blair followed in his father's footsteps and became a Christian pastor, but also remained involved in football as a broadcaster, announcing Oklahoma high school football games with former University of Oklahoma placekicker Tim Lashar, and also analyzing college football games for an Oklahoma City television station.
