= Dennis McKinnon =

American football player (born 1961)

No. 85
- Position: Wide receiver

Personal information
- Born: August 22, 1961 (age 65); Quitman, Georgia, U.S.
- Listed height: 6 ft 1 in (1.85 m)
- Listed weight: 185 lb (84 kg)

Career information
- High school: South Miami (Miami, Florida)
- College: Florida State
- NFL draft: 1983: undrafted

Career history
- Chicago Bears (1983–1989); Dallas Cowboys (1990); Miami Dolphins (1990)

Awards and highlights
- Super Bowl champion (XX); 100 greatest Bears of All-Time

Career NFL statistics
- Receptions: 194
- Receiving yards: 3,012
- Total touchdowns: 23
- Stats at Pro Football Reference

Dennis Lewis McKinnon (born August 22, 1961) is an American former professional football player who was a wide receiver in the National Football League (NFL) for the Chicago Bears, Dallas Cowboys and Miami Dolphins. He played college football for the Florida State Seminoles.

== Early life ==
McKinnon attended South Miami High School. He accepted a football scholarship from Florida State University.

He registered 53 receptions for 888 yards and 8 touchdowns in his career as a part-time starter at wide receiver.

As a junior in 1981, he had his best season, recording 28 receptions (second on the team), 377 receiving yards (second on the team), 13.5-yard average (sixth on the team) and 4 receiving touchdowns (led the team).

As a senior, he collected 10 receptions (tenth on the team), 263 receiving yards (third on the team), 26.3-yard average (led the team) and one touchdown. In the 1982 Gator Bowl, he had 2 receptions for 36 yards, one receiving touchdown and one carry for 65 rushing yards.

== Professional career ==
=== Chicago Bears ===
McKinnon was signed as an undrafted free agent by the Bears in 1983. He was the last undrafted free agent to score more than one touchdown for the Bears until Dane Sanzenbacher in 2011. He won Super Bowl XX as a member of the 1985 Chicago Bears.

In his eight seasons, McKinnon caught 194 passes for 3,012 yards and 22 touchdowns. He also returned 129 punts for 1,191 yards and three touchdowns, and scored a rushing touchdown. He caught 31 passes for 555 yards and seven touchdowns during the Bears' championship season in 1985.

McKinnon missed the entire 1986 season with a knee injury.

After spending the 1986 season on injured reserve, McKinnon returned in 1987 and scored on a 94-yard punt return in the season opener against the New York Giants. In Week 7 against the Tampa Bay Buccaneers, he scored again on a 65-yard punt return touchdown.

His best season was in 1988, when he caught 45 passes for 704 yards and three touchdowns, while also returning 40 punts for 405 yards and a franchise record two touchdowns (this record was later surpassed by Devin Hester in the 2006 season). He went on to catch four passes for 108 yards and a touchdown in Chicago's 20-12 postseason win in a game known as the Fog Bowl.

At the time of his retirement, McKinnon's 1,191 punt return yards were the second-highest total in Chicago franchise history. As of 2019, he held many playoff franchise records, including yards per reception and yards per game (17.3 and 43.1, min 20 receptions), receiving touchdowns (4 career; 2 in one season tied with Bernard Berrian), and most postseason games with a touchdown reception (3, tied with Willie Gault).

=== Dallas Cowboys ===
On March 3, 1990, the Dallas Cowboys signed McKinnon as a Plan B free agent. He appeared in 9 games with 7 starts, making 14 receptions for 172 yards and 2 touchdowns. He was released on November 14.

=== Miami Dolphins ===
On November 15, 1990, he signed as a free agent with the Miami Dolphins. He was released on November 19.

== NFL career statistics ==
Legend
	Won the Super Bowl
**Bold**	Career high

=== Regular season ===
Year	Team	Games		Receiving				
Year	Team	GP	GS	Rec	Yds	Avg	Lng	TD
1983	CHI	**16**	4	20	326	16.3	49	4
1984	CHI	12	12	29	431	14.9	32	3
1985	CHI	14	13	31	555	**17.9**	48	**7**
1987	CHI	12	0	27	406	15.0	33	1
1988	CHI	15	**15**	**45**	**704**	15.6	**76**	3
1989	CHI	**16**	10	28	418	14.9	41	3
1990	DAL	9	7	14	172	12.3	28	1
Career		94	61	194	3,012	15.5	76	22

=== Playoffs ===
Year	Team	Games		Receiving				
Year	Team	GP	GS	Rec	Yds	Avg	Lng	TD
1984	CHI	2	2	7	120	17.1	36	1
1985	CHI	**3**	**3**	4	69	17.3	23	**2**
1987	CHI	1	0	1	16	16.0	16	0
1988	CHI	2	2	**8**	**140**	**17.5**	**64**	1
Career		8	7	20	345	17.3	64	4

== Personal life ==
In August 2019, McKinnon released his autobiography, Chicago Bear #85 Silky D Bares All.
