= Emery Moorehead =

American football player (born 1954)

No. 80, 86, 43, 87
- Positions: Tight end, Wide receiver

Personal information
- Born: March 22, 1954 (age 72); Evanston, Illinois, U.S.
- Listed height: 6 ft 2 in (1.88 m)
- Listed weight: 218 lb (99 kg)

Career information
- High school: Evanston Township
- College: Colorado
- NFL draft: 1977: 6th round, 153rd overall pick

Career history
- New York Giants (1977–1979); Denver Broncos (1980); Chicago Bears (1981–1988)

Awards and highlights
- Super Bowl champion (XX)

Career NFL statistics
- Receptions: 224
- Receiving yards: 2,980
- Receiving touchdowns: 15
- Stats at Pro Football Reference

Emery Matthew Moorehead (born March 22, 1954) is an American former professional football player who was a tight end and wide receiver in the National Football League (NFL) for the New York Giants, Denver Broncos, and the Chicago Bears. He won a Super Bowl ring as the starting tight end and a member of the 1985 Chicago Bears. Moorehead played college football for the Colorado Buffaloes football, where he played running back his first two seasons before converting to wide receiver as a junior. He captained the 1976 Big Eight Conference champion Buffalos and finished his college career with 231 rushing yards, 40 receptions for 751 yards, and six touchdowns. Moorehead was drafted in the sixth round of the 1977 NFL draft.

Moorehead is the father of ex-Indianapolis Colts receiver Aaron Moorehead, and the cousin of former NBA basketball player Brad Daugherty. Emery and his son Aaron are the NFL's first father and son duo to have both played in and won Super Bowls.

Moorehead played a total of 12 seasons in the NFL and retired with 224 receptions for 2,980 yards and 15 touchdowns. He also returned 31 kickoffs for 617 yards and rushed for 114 yards. Moorehead was inducted into the Chicagoland Sports Hall of Fame in 1999 and later became a director of the Hall. He has served on the Board of Directors of Northeast Illinois Council of Boy Scouts since 1989. Moorehead earned the rank of Eagle Scout (1969) was awarded the Distinguished Eagle Scout Award in 2012.

Moorehead was a real estate agent from 1986 until 2013 with Koenig & Strey Berkshire Hathaway Home Services of America in Northbrook, Illinois, and is Past Chairman of the North Shore - Barrington Association of realtors.
