= Dennis Gentry =

American football player (born 1959)

No. 29
- Positions: Running back, return specialist, wide receiver

Personal information
- Born: February 10, 1959 (age 67); Lubbock, Texas, U.S.
- Listed height: 5 ft 8 in (1.73 m)
- Listed weight: 173 lb (78 kg)

Career information
- High school: Dunbar (Lubbock)
- College: Baylor
- NFL draft: 1982: 4th round, 89th overall pick

Career history
- Chicago Bears (1982–1992)

Awards and highlights
- Super Bowl champion (XX); First-team All-Pro (1986); Second-team All-Pro (1987); First-team All-SWC (1980)

Career NFL statistics
- Receptions: 171
- Receiving yards: 2,076
- Return yards: 4,353
- Total touchdowns: 16
- Stats at Pro Football Reference

Dennis Louis Gentry (born February 10, 1959) is an American former professional football player for the Chicago Bears of the National Football League (NFL). He played college football for the Baylor Bears. He was selected by the Chicago Bears in the fourth round of the 1982 NFL draft. He spent his entire 11-year NFL career with Chicago from 1982 to 1992, and was a part of the Bears team that was victorious in Super Bowl XX versus the New England Patriots. He was also a member of the "Chicago Bears Shufflin' Crew" in the video "The Super Bowl Shuffle," which featured him pantomiming on the bass.

In 2001, he was the running backs coach for the XFL's Chicago Enforcers until the league folded. Later that year he was hired as a BLESTO regional scout for the Detroit Lions until 2011.

Gentry finished his career with 171 receptions for 2,076 yards and seven touchdowns. He also rushed for 764 yards and five touchdowns. But his main contribution came as a kick returner, and is currently ranked third in return yardage (4,353) for the Bears. Dennis is also tied for the club's all-time kick returns with 192. In 1986, he led the NFL with a 28.8-yards-per-return average.
