= Vestee Jackson =

American football player (born 1963)

No. 24
- Position: Cornerback

Personal information
- Born: August 14, 1963 (age 63); Fresno, California, U.S.
- Listed height: 6 ft 0 in (1.83 m)
- Listed weight: 189 lb (86 kg)

Career information
- High school: McLane (Fresno)
- College: Washington
- NFL draft: 1986: 2nd round, 55th overall pick

Career history
- Chicago Bears (1986–1990); Miami Dolphins (1991–1993)

Awards and highlights
- Second-team All-American (1985); First-team All-Pac-10 (1985); Second-team All-Pac-10 (1984)

Career NFL statistics
- Interceptions: 18
- Fumble recoveries: 4
- Touchdowns: 2
- Stats at Pro Football Reference

Vestee Jackson II (born August 14, 1963) is an American former professional football player who was a cornerback in the National Football League (NFL). He played college football for the Washington Huskies.

== College career ==
Jackson finished his college career with 13 interceptions from 1983–1985 at the University of Washington. He earned second-team All-America honors as a senior.

== Professional career ==
Jackson was selected in the second round (55th overall) by the Bears in the 1986 NFL draft. He played eight seasons in the NFL, mostly with the Chicago Bears (1986–1990) and the Miami Dolphins (1991–1993).

His rookie year, he had 3 interceptions and followed it up with 2 in 1987. His best season was 1988, when he led the NFC with 8 interceptions. He would follow it up with 2 in 1989 and 1 interception in 1990.

With the Miami Dolphins, he contributed 3 interceptions in 1992 but would retire after the 1993 season.

== See also ==
- Washington Huskies football statistical leaders
