= Shaun Gayle =

American football player (born 1962)

No. 23
- Position: Safety

Personal information
- Born: March 8, 1962 (age 64); Newport News, Virginia, U.S.
- Listed height: 5 ft 11 in (1.80 m)
- Listed weight: 202 lb (92 kg)

Career information
- High school: Bethel (Hampton, Virginia)
- College: Ohio State
- NFL draft: 1984: 10th round, 271st overall pick

Career history
- Chicago Bears (1984–1994); San Diego Chargers (1995)

Awards and highlights
- Super Bowl champion (XX); Pro Bowl (1991); Second-team All-Big Ten (1982)

Career NFL statistics
- Interceptions: 16
- Fumble recoveries: 12
- Touchdowns: 3
- Stats at Pro Football Reference

Shaun Lanard Gayle (born March 8, 1962) is an American former professional football player who was a defensive back in the National Football League (NFL). He played twelve seasons, eleven for the Chicago Bears (1984–1994), and one for the San Diego Chargers (1995). He attended Ohio State University and was selected by the Bears in the tenth round of the 1984 NFL draft with the 271st overall pick.

== Professional career ==
Gayle was a member of the Bears squad that won Super Bowl XX in 1985. He was also a member of the "Shuffling Crew" in "The Super Bowl Shuffle", where he was part of the chorus; Gayle recalled years later that "some of us just wanted to be in the back."

He owns the distinction of returning the shortest punt for a touchdown in NFL history, when he returned a punt five yards for a touchdown against the New York Giants in the Bears' 1985 divisional playoff victory. He is also known for delivering a late blow to San Francisco 49ers quarterback Steve Young while a member of the Bears; the incident occurred in the end zone during a playoff game after Young scored a rushing touchdown. Following the hit, Young spiked the football in Gayle's direction, and Gayle was then confronted by other 49ers players in a brief melee.

He often appears with former teammates at Bears fan conventions, and works as an NFL analyst for Sky Sports, appearing on the weekly NFL broadcast.

== Personal life ==
=== Murder of Rhoni Reuter ===
Gayle had a relationship with Rhoni Reuter, originally of Potosi, Wisconsin. On October 4, 2007, Reuter was about seven months pregnant with Gayle's child when she was shot and killed at her condominium in Deerfield, Illinois. On March 3, 2009, a Chicago woman, Marni Yang, 41, was arrested and charged with two counts of first-degree murder. Yang was also in a relationship with Gayle. It was alleged that Yang was wearing a disguise when she shot and killed Reuter in a jealous rage. In March 2011, Yang was convicted of first-degree murder for the killing and sentenced to a mandatory life sentence.

Yang's attorney asserted that Gayle provided false information to the police, and that his whereabouts were unknown for the time of the murder. However, the court confirmed Yang's conviction and sentence in 2026.
