= 1983 Chicago Bears season =

NFL team season

- Owner: George Halas (until October 31); The McCaskey Family (Family control since 1921; Virginia McCaskey since 1983)
- General manager: Jim Finks
- Head coach: Mike Ditka
- Home stadium: Soldier Field

Results
- Record: 8–8
- Division place: 3rd NFC Central
- Playoffs: Did not qualify
- All-Pros: 2: RB Walter Payton; MLB Mike Singletary
- Pro Bowlers: 2: RB Walter Payton; MLB Mike Singletary

The 1983 season was the Chicago Bears' 64th in the National Football League, and their second under head coach Mike Ditka. The team improved from their 3–6 record from 1982 to finish at 8–8, but to failed to make the playoffs for the fourth consecutive season. Jim McMahon was the quarterback, who completed 175 of 295 pass attempts. The Bears 1983 NFL draft class was ranked #3 in NFL Top 10's greatest draft classes.

== Offseason ==
=== 1983 NFL draft ===
1983 Chicago Bears draft
Round	Pick	Player	Position	College	Notes
1	6	Jim Covert * ^{†}	Offensive tackle	Pittsburgh	
1	18	Willie Gault	Wide receiver	Tennessee	
2	33	Mike Richardson	Cornerback	Arizona State	
3	64	Dave Duerson *	Safety	Notre Dame	
4	91	Tom Thayer	Center	Notre Dame	
4	107	Pat Dunsmore	Tight end	Drake	
8	203	Richard Dent ^{†}	Defensive end	Tennessee State	
8	219	Mark Bortz *	Guard	Iowa	
9	230	Rob Fada	Guard	Pittsburgh	
9	235	Mark Zavagnin	Linebacker	Notre Dame	
10	256	Anthony Hutchison	Running back	Texas Tech	
11	286	Gary Worthy	Running back	Wilmington (OH)	
12	313	Oliver Williams	Wide receiver	Illinois	
Made roster † Pro Football Hall of Fame * Made at least one Pro Bowl during career

=== Undrafted free agents ===
1983 undrafted free agents of note
Player	Position	College
Dave McCarrell	Quarterback	Wheaton
Dan Ruzich	Linebacker	Kansas State
Dennis McKinnon	Wide Receiver	Florida State

== Roster and staff ==
=== Staff ===
Coaching Staff of 1983 season
Front office: Virginia Halas McCaskey – Owner; Michael McCaskey – Team president; Jerry Vainisi – General manager; Ray Earley – Equipment manager; Coaches: Mike Ditka – Head coach; Steve Kazor – Assistant head coach; Ed Hughes – Offensive coordinator; Buddy Ryan – Defensive coordinator	Position coaches: Ted Plumb – Offensive specialist; Johnny Roland – Running backs; Dick Stanfel – Offensive line; Dale Haupt – Defensive line; Jim LaRue – Secondary; Trainers: Brian McCaskey – Assistant trainer; Clyde Emrich – Weightlifting/Strength	Scouts: Jim Dooley; Pete McGrane – Video team

=== Roster ===
1983 Chicago Bears roster
Quarterbacks (QB): 7 Bob Avellini; 8 Vince Evans; 9 Jim McMahon; Running backs (RB): 29 Dennis Gentry; 32 Anthony Hutchison; 34 Walter Payton; 26 Matt Suhey; 33 Calvin Thomas; Wide receivers (WR): 84 Brian Baschnagel; 83 Willie Gault; 82 Ken Margerum; 85 Dennis McKinnon; Tight ends (TE): 88 Pat Dunsmore; 87 Emery Moorehead; 81 Jay Saldi	Offensive linemen (OL): 79 Kurt Becker G; 62 Mark Bortz G; 74 Jim Covert T; 64 Rob Fada G; 71 Andy Frederick T; 63 Jay Hilgenberg C; 65 Noah Jackson G; 72 John Janata T; 67 Tim Norman G; 78 Keith Van Horne T; Defensive linemen (DL): 95 Richard Dent DE; 99 Dan Hampton DT; 90 Al Harris DE; 73 Mike Hartenstine DE; 98 Tyrone Keys DE; 76 Steve McMichael DT; 68 Jim Osborne DT	Linebackers (LB): 51 Kelvin Atkins MLB; 59 Gary Campbell OLB; 54 Brian Cabral OLB; 53 Dan Rains OLB; 57 Dave Simmons OLB; 50 Mike Singletary MLB; 55 Otis Wilson OLB; Defensive backs (DB): 25 Todd Bell SS; 22 Dave Duerson FS; 45 Gary Fencik FS; 21 Leslie Frazier CB; 27 Mike Richardson CB; 44 Terry Schmidt CB; 20 Kevin Potter SS; 43 Walt Williams CB; Special teams (ST): 19 Ray Stachowicz P; 16 Bob Thomas K	Reserve: 24 Jeff Fisher S (IR); 35 Roland Harper RB (IR); 58 Jerry Muckensturm LB (IR); 52 Dan Neal C (IR); 19 Dan Plater WR (IR); 69 Revie Sorey G (IR); 80 Rickey Watts WR (IR); Rookies in italics

== Preseason ==
The Bears were predicted to finish 7–9 and fourth in the division by Paul Zimmerman. Their prized new weapon would be Willie Gault. Dennis McKinnon (signed as an undrafted free agent by the Bears in 1983) would also play a key role in the receiving corps and Jimbo Covert would help open bigger holes for Walter Payton but it was felt they were a few offensive lineman and a tight end away from being effective. The defense would be led by All-Pro Dan Hampton and new defensive backs Mike Richardson and Dave Duerson. The Bears started 1983 by losing 7 of their first 10, but won 5 of their last 6 to finish 8–8. The Bears would go 71–18 in regular season games from November 13, 1983, through October 2, 1989.

Week	Date	Opponent	Result	Record	Venue
1	August 6	Buffalo Bills	W 27–17	1–0	Soldier Field
2	August 13	at St. Louis Cardinals	L 24–27	1–1	Busch Stadium
3	August 20	at Los Angeles Raiders	W 27–21	2–1	Los Angeles Memorial Coliseum
4	August 27	Kansas City Chiefs	W 20–17	3–1	Soldier Field

== Regular season ==
=== Schedule ===
Week	Date	Opponent	Result	Record	Venue	Attendance
1	September 4	Atlanta Falcons	**L** 17–20	0–1	Soldier Field	60,165
2	September 11	**Tampa Bay Buccaneers**	**W** 17–10	1–1	Soldier Field	58,186
3	September 18	at New Orleans Saints	**L** 31–34	1–2	Louisiana Superdome	64,692
4	September 25	at Baltimore Colts	L 19–22	1–3	Memorial Stadium	34,350
5	October 2	Denver Broncos	**W** 31–14	2–3	Soldier Field	58,210
6	October 9	**Minnesota Vikings**	**L** 14–23	2–4	Soldier Field	59,632
7	October 16	at **Detroit Lions**	**L** 17–31	2–5	Pontiac Silverdome	66,709
8	October 23	at Philadelphia Eagles	**W** 7–6	3–5	Veterans Stadium	45,263
9	October 30	**Detroit Lions**	**L** 17–38	3–6	Soldier Field	58,764
10	November 6	at Los Angeles Rams	**L** 14–21	3–7	Anaheim Stadium	53,010
11	November 13	Philadelphia Eagles	**W** 17–14	4–7	Soldier Field	47,524
12	November 20	at **Tampa Bay Buccaneers**	**W** 27–0	5–7	Tampa Stadium	36,816
13	November 27	San Francisco 49ers	**W** 13–3	6–7	Soldier Field	40,483
14	December 4	at **Green Bay Packers**	**L** 28–31	6–8	Lambeau Field	51,147
15	December 11	at **Minnesota Vikings**	W 19–13	7–8	Hubert H. Humphrey Metrodome	57,880
16	December 18	**Green Bay Packers**	**W** 23–21	8–8	Soldier Field	35,807
Note: Intra-division opponents are in **bold** text.

=== Game summaries ===
==== Week 1: vs. Atlanta Falcons ====
Quarter	1	2	3	4	Total
**Falcons**	6	0	7	7	**20**
Bears	0	10	7	0	**17**

at Soldier Field, Chicago

- Date: Sunday, September 4
- Game time: 12:00 p.m.
- Game weather: 80 °F (27 °C), wind 12 mph (19 km/h)
- Referee: Chuck Heberling
- TV announcers (CBS): Tim Ryan, Johnny Morris
- Pro-Football-Reference.com

==== Week 2 vs Tampa Bay Buccaneers ====
Quarter	1	2	3	4	Total
Buccaneers	0	3	7	0	**10**
**Bears**	0	10	0	7	**17**

at Soldier Field, Chicago, Illinois

- Date: September 11
- Game time: 12:00 p.m.
- Game weather: 68 °F (20 °C), wind 11 mph (18 km/h)
- Referee: Ben Dreith
- TV announcers (CBS): Tim Ryan, Johnny Morris
- Box Score

CHI: Mike Hartenstine 2.0 sacks, Terry Schmidt INT

Scoring summary

Quarter	Time	Drive			Team	Scoring information	Score	
Quarter	Time	Plays	Yards	TOP	Team	Scoring information	Buccaneers	Bears
2					Buccaneers	20-yard field goal by Bill Capece	3	0
2					Bears	Walter Payton 73-yard touchdown reception from Jim McMahon, Bob Thomas kick good	3	7
2					Bears	50-yard field goal by Bob Thomas	3	10
3					Buccaneers	James Owens 1-yard touchdown run, Bob Capece kick good	10	10
4					Bears	Terry Schmidt 32-yard interception return, Bob Thomas kick good	10	17
"TOP" = time of possession. For other American football terms, see Glossary of American football.							10	17

==== Week 3: at New Orleans Saints ====
Quarter	1	2	3	4	OT	Total
Bears	7	3	7	14	0	**31**
**Saints**	7	3	14	7	3	**34**

at Louisiana Superdome, New Orleans, Louisiana

- Date: Sunday, September 18
- Game time: 12:00 p.m.
- Game weather: Indoors, dome
- Referee: Fred Wyant
- TV announcers (CBS): Tim Ryan, Johnny Morris
- Pro-Football-Reference.com

==== Week 4: at Baltimore Colts ====
Quarter	1	2	3	4	OT	Total
Bears	0	3	3	13	0	**19**
**Colts**	0	13	0	6	3	**22**

at Memorial Stadium, Baltimore, Maryland

- Date: Sunday, September 25
- Game time: 2:00 p.m.
- Game weather: 54 °F (12 °C), wind 7 mph (11 km/h)
- Referee: Jerry Seeman
- TV announcers (CBS): Tim Ryan and Johnny Morris
- Pro-Football-Reference.com

==== Week 5: vs. Denver Broncos ====
Quarter	1	2	3	4	Total
Broncos	0	0	7	7	**14**
**Bears**	14	10	0	7	**31**

at Soldier Field, Chicago, Illinois

- Date: Sunday, October 2
- Game time: 12:00 p.m.
- Game weather: 68 °F (20 °C), wind 13 mph (21 km/h)
- Referee: Fred Silva
- TV announcers (NBC): Charlie Jones and Bob Griese
- Pro-Football-Reference.com

==== Week 8: at Philadelphia Eagles ====
Quarter	1	2	3	4	Total
**Bears**	7	0	0	0	**7**
Eagles	0	0	3	3	**6**

at Veterans Stadium, Philadelphia

- Date: Sunday, October 23
- Game time: 1:00 p.m.
- Game weather: 50 °F (10 °C), wind 9 mph (14 km/h)
- Referee: Dick Jorgensen
- TV announcers (CBS): Tim Ryan and Johnny Morris
- Pro-Football-Reference.com

==== Week 9: vs. Detroit Lions ====
Quarter	1	2	3	4	Total
**Lions**	14	3	14	7	**38**
Bears	0	3	0	14	**17**

at Soldier Field, Chicago, Illinois

- Date: Sunday, October 30
- Game time: 12:00 p.m.
- Game weather: 43 °F (6 °C), wind 10 mph (16 km/h)
- Referee: Tom Dooley
- Pro-Football-Reference.com

==== Week 11: vs. Philadelphia Eagles ====
Quarter	1	2	3	4	Total
Eagles	7	0	7	0	**14**
**Bears**	0	14	0	3	**17**

at Soldier Field, Chicago, Illinois

- Date: Sunday, November 13
- Game time: 1:00 p.m.
- Game weather: 33 °F (1 °C), wind 8 mph (13 km/h)
- Referee: Bob McElwee
- TV announcers (CBS): Tim Ryan and Johnny Morris
- Pro-Football-Reference.com

==== Week 12: at Tampa Bay Buccaneers ====
Quarter	1	2	3	4	Total
**Bears**	0	14	6	7	**27**
Buccaneers	0	0	0	0	**0**

at Tampa Stadium, Tampa, Florida

- Date: Sunday, November 20
- Game time: 1:00 p.m.
- Game weather: 69 °F (21 °C), wind 12 mph (19 km/h)
- Referee: Red Cashion
- Pro-Football-Reference.com

==== Week 13: vs. San Francisco 49ers ====
Quarter	1	2	3	4	Total
49ers	3	0	0	0	**3**
**Bears**	3	7	3	0	**13**

at Soldier Field, Chicago, Illinois

- Date: Sunday, November 27
- Game time: 12:00 p.m.
- Game weather: 39 °F (4 °C), wind 18 mph (29 km/h)
- Referee: Pat Haggerty
- Pro-Football-Reference.com

==== Week 14: at Green Bay Packers ====
Quarter	1	2	3	4	Total
Bears	7	7	0	14	**28**
**Packers**	14	7	0	10	**31**

at Lambeau Field, Green Bay, Wisconsin

- Date: Sunday, December 4
- Game time: 1:00 p.m.
- Game weather: 25 °F (−4 °C), wind 6 mph (9.7 km/h)
- Referee: Ben Dreith
- Pro-Football-Reference.com

==== Week 15: at Minnesota Vikings ====
Team	1	2	3	4	Total
• Bears	10	6	0	3	19
Vikings	6	0	7	0	13

- Date: December 11
- Location: Hubert H. Humphrey Metrodome, Minneapolis, Minnesota
- Game start: 12:00 p.m.
- Game weather: Indoors (dome)
- Referee: Tom Dooley
- TV announcers (CBS): Tim Ryan and Johnny Morris

Scoring summary
Q1	MIN	Benny Ricardo 30-yard field goal	MIN 3–0
Q1	MIN	Benny Ricardo 29-yard field goal	MIN 6–0
Q1	CHI	Walter Payton 74-yard pass from Matt Suhey (Bob Thomas kick)	CHI 7–6
Q1	CHI	Bob Thomas 42-yard field goal	CHI 10–6
Q2	CHI	Emery Moorehead 2-yard pass from Jim McMahon (kick failed)	CHI 16–6
Q3	MIN	Ted Brown 1 yard run (Benny Ricardo kick)	CHI 16–13
Q4	CHI	Bob Thomas 22-yard field goal	CHI 19–13

==== Week 16 vs. Green Bay Packers ====
Week 16: Green Bay Packers (8–7) at Chicago Bears (7–8)

Quarter	1	2	3	4	Total
Packers	7	7	0	7	**21**
**Bears**	7	0	7	9	**23**

at Soldier Field, Chicago, Illinois

- Date: December 18
- Game time: 1:00 p.m.
- Game weather: 1 °F (−17 °C)
- Game attendance: 35,807
- Referee: Red Cashion
- Pro-Football-Reference.com, The Football Database

Game information

First quarter

- CHI – Willie Gault 35-yard pass from Jim McMahon (Bob Thomas kick), 9:24. Bears 7–0.
- GB – Lynn Dickey 1-yard run (Jan Stenerud kick), 8:10. Tie 7–7.

Second quarter

- GB – James Lofton 31-yard pass from Lynn Dickey (Jan Stenerud kick), 3:05. Packers 14–7.

Third quarter

- CHI – Dennis McKinnon 22-yard pass from Jim McMahon (Bob Thomas kick), 6:35. Tie 14–14.

Fourth quarter

- CHI – Jim McMahon 6-yard run (kick failed), 4:34. Bears 20–14.
- GB – Paul Coffman 5-yard pass from Lynn Dickey (Jan Stenerud kick), 3:08. Packers 21–20.
- CHI – Bob Thomas 22-yard field goal, 0:10. Bears 23–21.

Top passers

- GB – Lynn Dickey – 10/30, 262 yards, 2 TD, 4 INT
- CHI – Jim McMahon – 14/25, 162 yards, 2 TD, 2 INT

Top rushers

- GB – Jessie Clark – 7 rushes, 61 yards
- CHI – Walter Payton – 30 rushes, 148 yards

Top receivers

- GB – Paul Coffman – 4 receptions, 122 yards, TD
- CHI – Willie Gault – 2 receptions, 50 yards, TD

=== Standings ===
NFC Central
	W	L	T	PCT	DIV	CONF	PF	PA	STK
^{(3)} Detroit Lions	9	7	0	.563	7–1	8–4	347	286	W1
Green Bay Packers	8	8	0	.500	4–4	6–6	429	439	L1
Chicago Bears	8	8	0	.500	4–4	7–7	311	301	W2
Minnesota Vikings	8	8	0	.500	4–4	4–8	316	348	W1
Tampa Bay Buccaneers	2	14	0	.125	1–7	1–11	241	380	L3
