= Pat Dunsmore =

American football player (born 1959)

No. 88
- Position: Tight end

Personal information
- Born: October 2, 1959 (age 67); Duluth, Minnesota, U.S.
- Listed height: 6 ft 3 in (1.91 m)
- Listed weight: 237 lb (108 kg)

Career information
- High school: Ankeny (Ankeny, Iowa)
- College: Drake
- NFL draft: 1983: 4th round, 107th overall pick

Career history
- Chicago Bears (1983–1985)

Career NFL statistics
- Receptions: 17
- Receiving yards: 208
- Receiving touchdowns: 1
- Stats at Pro Football Reference

Patrick Neil Dunsmore (born October 2, 1959) is an American former professional football player who was a tight end for three seasons with the Chicago Bears of the National Football League (NFL). He is a graduate of Ankeny High School in Ankeny, Iowa and Drake University. He switched sports (to football) as a senior in high school and switched positions (to tight end) as a senior in college. He played for Drake during a historically successful era for the school. As a professional, he is best remembered as the recipient of a Walter Payton playoff touchdown and a victim of a pileup in a bench clearing brawl. He is the father of Drake Dunsmore.

== Early life ==
At Ankeny, he competed in basketball until his senior year, when he became a football player and earned a football scholarship. At Drake, he was a highly regarded tight end, after converting from wide receiver as a senior, who slipped to the 106th pick in the 1983 NFL draft after suffering a knee injury while skiing in early 1983. On September 13, 1980, he had 142 yards and six receptions for two touchdowns against Ball State. Dunsmore, was part of a historic era for Drake Bulldogs football including the nearly undefeated 1981 Drake Bulldogs football team. The team's 7–0 start was the school's first in 37 years, which caused Sports Illustrated to do a feature on the team. Then, he was part of the Bears 1983 Draft class with Jimbo Covert, Willie Gault, Mike Richardson, Dave Duerson, Tom Thayer, Richard Dent and Mark Bortz.

== Professional career ==
He played all 16 games for the 1983 Bears, making 8 receptions for 102 yards. He was placed on injured reserve on August 30, 1984, and taken off of injured reserve on September 29, 1984. He then played in 11 regular season games for the 1984 Bears, totaling 9 receptions for 106 yards and a touchdown. He caught a 19-yard touchdown pass from Walter Payton in the 1984–85 NFL playoffs on December 30 against the Washington Redskins, but was on injured reserve during the 1985 Bears Super Bowl XX season. The 23–19 victory at RFK Stadium was the team's first playoff victory since 1963. The play occurred two minutes before the half when Payton took a pitch from Steve Fuller and threw the pass, giving the Bears a 10–3 halftime lead.

Dunsmore was able to play with the 1986 Bears in the preseason. In a late preseason game against the St. Louis Cardinals, Dunsmore came to the aid of teammate Keith Van Horne during a bench-clearing brawl. Dunsmore and Van Horne were pinned against the wall behind the Cardinals bench. Dunsmore was trampled, kicked and punched by Charlie Baker, Ottis Anderson and Earnest Gray on national television. Dunsmore was among the last four players cut when the team cut to the 45-man roster limit a little over a week later. The following week, when fines were announced by the NFL, Otis Wilson expressed his disbelief ". . . Dunsmore got fined? He almost got killed."
