= 1985 Chicago Bears season =

NFL team season (won Super Bowl)

- Owner: The McCaskey Family
- General manager: Jerry Vainisi
- Head coach: Mike Ditka
- Offensive coordinator: Ed Hughes
- Defensive coordinator: Buddy Ryan
- Home stadium: Soldier Field

Results
- Record: 15–1
- Division place: 1st NFC Central
- Playoffs: Won Divisional Playoffs (vs. Giants) 21–0; Won NFC Championship (vs. Rams) 24–0; Won Super Bowl XX (vs. Patriots) 46–10
- All-Pros: 10: RB Walter Payton; LT Jimbo Covert; C Jay Hilgenberg; DL Dan Hampton; DT Steve McMichael; DE Richard Dent; OLB Otis Wilson; MLB Mike Singletary; FS Gary Fencik; K Kevin Butler
- Pro Bowlers: 9: QB Jim McMahon; RB Walter Payton; LT Jimbo Covert; C Jay Hilgenberg; DL Dan Hampton; DE Richard Dent; OLB Otis Wilson; MLB Mike Singletary; SS Dave Duerson

The 1985 season was the Chicago Bears' 66th in the National Football League (NFL) and their fourth under head coach Mike Ditka. The Bears entered 1985 looking to improve on their 10–6 record from 1984 and advance further than the NFC Championship Game, where they lost to the 15–1 San Francisco 49ers. The Bears not only improved on that record, they put together what would be considered by many football historians the greatest season in NFL history.

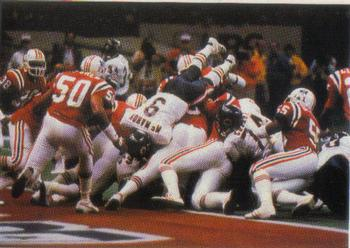
The Bears making a rushing play in the end zone against the Patriots during Super Bowl XX

The Bears won their first twelve games of the season before losing to the Miami Dolphins on Monday Night Football. The loss to the Dolphins would be the only loss the Bears would suffer that season, as they finished with a 15–1 record. This matched the 49ers' mark from the year before and tied the then-record for most wins in a regular season. The record would be reached on three more occasions—in 1998 (Minnesota Vikings), 2004 (Pittsburgh Steelers), and 2015 (Carolina Panthers). The New England Patriots ended the 2007 NFL season with a 16–0 regular season record. However, none of these latter teams went on to win the Super Bowl.

The Bears' defense was ranked first in the league and only allowed 198 total points (an average of 12.4 points per game). The Bears won the NFC Central Division by seven games over the second-place Green Bay Packers and earned home-field advantage throughout the playoffs as the NFC's top seed at Soldier Field. In their two playoff games against the New York Giants and Los Angeles Rams, the Bears outscored their opponents 45–0 and became the first team to record back-to-back playoff shutouts.

Then, in Super Bowl XX at the Louisiana Superdome against the New England Patriots, the Bears set several more records. First, their 46 points broke the previous record of 38 that had been scored by the Los Angeles Raiders in Super Bowl XVIII and again by the 49ers in Super Bowl XIX. Their 36-point margin of victory also topped the 29-point margin of victory that the Raiders recorded over the Washington Redskins in Super Bowl XVIII. Both of those records would stand until Super Bowl XXIV in New Orleans four years later, when the 49ers defeated the Denver Broncos by 45 points, 55–10. This was the Bears' first championship since 1963 and is their most recent title.

The 1985 Chicago Bears are one of the few teams to consistently challenge the undefeated 1972 Miami Dolphins for the title of the greatest NFL team of all time. In 2007, the 1985 Bears were ranked as the second greatest Super Bowl championship team on the NFL Network's documentary series America's Game: The Super Bowl Champions, ranking behind only the 1972 Dolphins. They also ranked #2 behind only the Dolphins on the 100 greatest teams of all time presented by the NFL on its 100th anniversary. Other sources rate the 1985 Chicago Bears as the greatest NFL team ever.

The defense led the league in points allowed (198), yards allowed (4,135) and takeaways (54), a feat that was not accomplished again until the 2013 Seattle Seahawks defense.

== Offseason ==
=== Transactions ===
==== Signings ====
After the draft, the Bears signed 3 undrafted free agents, quarterback Mike Tomczak from Ohio State, along with defensive back Ken Taylor and receiver Keith Ortego of Oregon State and McNeese State, respectively.

==== Trades ====
In a trade with the San Diego Chargers, the Bears acquired linebacker Cliff Thrift and punter Maury Buford by trading away their 12th-round draft picks from 1985 and 1986, respectively.

=== Contractual issues ===
During training camp, seven players, including Mike Singletary, Steve McMichael, Keith Van Horne and rookie William Perry, were either unsigned or holding out due to their contracts. Perry, McMichael and Van Horne eventually reported to training camp. Perry held out until August 5, when he signed a four-year, $1.35 million contract. However, after an unimpressive showing at training camp, defensive coordinator Buddy Ryan tabbed Perry as a "wasted draft-pick". Before the team's season opening game against the Tampa Bay Buccaneers, players Al Harris, Todd Bell and Richard Dent requested to be traded. Dent and the Bears had been attempting to work out a contract extension, as his contract ran through the 1985 season, and paid him $90,000. Bell played for $77,000 the year before, and made the 1985 Pro Bowl roster, but asked for $950,000 annually, which would have made him the highest-paid player on the team. Bell and Harris would eventually hold out for the season.

=== 1985 NFL draft ===
1985 Chicago Bears draft
Round	Pick	Player	Position	College	Notes
1	22	William Perry	Defensive tackle	Clemson	
2	49	Reggie Phillips	Defensive back	SMU	
3	78	James Maness	Wide receiver	TCU	
4	105	Kevin Butler	Kicker	Georgia	
7	190	Charles Bennett	Defensive end	SW La.	
8	217	Steve Buxton	Offensive tackle	Indiana State	
9	250	Thomas Sanders	Running back	Texas A&M	
10	273	Pat Coryatt	Defensive tackle	Baylor	
11	302	Jim Morrissey	Linebacker	Michigan State	
Made roster † Pro Football Hall of Fame * Made at least one Pro Bowl during career

=== Undrafted free agents ===
1985 undrafted free agents of note
Player	Position	College
Ken Cruz	Quarterback	Illinois
Curtis Garrett	Defensive tackle	Illinois State
Kevin Gray	Defensive back	Eastern Illinois
John Hill	Defensive back	Duke
Stan Johnson	Wide receiver	Wisconsin–La Crosse
Bruce Kallmeyer	Kicker	Kansas
Don Kindt Jr.	Tight end	Wisconsin–La Crosse
Mike Tomczak	Quarterback	Ohio State
Mike Viracola	Punter	Notre Dame

== Staff ==
1985 Chicago Bears staff
Front office: Owner – Virginia Halas McCaskey; Team president – Michael McCaskey; General manager – Jerry Vainisi; Director of player personnel – Bill Tobin; Equipment manager – Ray Earley; Assistant equipment manager – Gary Haeger; Scout – Jim Dooley; Regional Scout – Rod Graves; Director of video services – Mitch Friedman; Video team – Pete McGrane; Head coaches: Head coach – Mike Ditka; Offensive coaches: Offensive coordinator – Ed Hughes; Offensive specialist – Ted Plumb; Running backs – Johnny Roland; Offensive line – Dick Stanfel	Defensive coaches: Defensive coordinator – Buddy Ryan; Defensive line – Dale Haupt; Secondary – Jim LaRue; Special teams coaches: Special teams/tight ends – Steve Kazor; Strength and conditioning: Trainer – Fred Caito; Assistant trainer – Brian McCaskey; Weightlifting/Strength – Clyde Emrich

== Roster ==
1985 Chicago Bears roster
Quarterbacks (QB): 4 Steve Fuller; 9 Jim McMahon; 18 Mike Tomczak; Running backs (RB): 29 Dennis Gentry; 34 Walter Payton; 20 Thomas Sanders; 26 Matt Suhey; 33 Calvin Thomas; Wide receivers (WR): 86 Brad Anderson; 83 Willie Gault; 82 Ken Margerum; 85 Dennis McKinnon; 89 Keith Ortego; Tight ends (TE): 87 Emery Moorehead; 80 Tim Wrightman	Offensive linemen (OL): 60 Tom Andrews C; 62 Mark Bortz G; 74 Jim Covert T; 71 Andy Frederick T; 63 Jay Hilgenberg C; 75 Stefan Humphries G; 57 Tom Thayer G; 78 Keith Van Horne T; Defensive linemen (DL): 95 Richard Dent DE; 99 Dan Hampton DE/DT; 73 Mike Hartenstine DE; 98 Tyrone Keys DE; 76 Steve McMichael DT; 72 William Perry DT; 70 Henry Waechter DT	Linebackers (LB): 58 Wilber Marshall OLB; 51 Jim Morrissey OLB; 59 Ron Rivera MLB; 50 Mike Singletary MLB; 52 Cliff Thrift OLB; 55 Otis Wilson OLB; Defensive backs (DB): 22 Dave Duerson SS; 45 Gary Fencik FS; 21 Leslie Frazier CB; 23 Shaun Gayle CB/S; 48 Reggie Phillips CB; 27 Mike Richardson CB; 31 Ken Taylor CB; Special teams (ST): 8 Maury Buford P; 6 Kevin Butler K	Reserve: 84 Brian Baschnagel WR (IR); 79 Kurt Becker G (IR); 54 Brian Cabral LB (IR); 88 Pat Dunsmore TE (IR); 24 Jeff Fisher CB (IR); 89 Mitch Krenk TE (IR); 81 James Maness WR (IR); 53 Dan Rains LB (IR); Rookies in italics

== Preseason ==
=== Schedule ===
Week	Date	Opponent	Result	Record	Venue	Recap
1	August 9	at St. Louis Cardinals	L 3–10	0–1	Busch Stadium	Recap
2	August 17	Indianapolis Colts	L 13–24	0–2	Soldier Field	Recap
3	August 26	at Dallas Cowboys	L 13–15	0–3	Texas Stadium	Recap
4	August 31	Buffalo Bills	W 45–14	1–3	Soldier Field	Recap

== Regular season ==
=== Schedule ===
Week	Date	Opponent	Result	Record	Venue	Recap
1	September 8	Tampa Bay Buccaneers	W 38–28	1–0	Soldier Field	Recap
2	September 15	New England Patriots	W 20–7	2–0	Soldier Field	Recap
3	September 19	at Minnesota Vikings	W 33–24	3–0	Hubert H. Humphrey Metrodome	Recap
4	September 29	Washington Redskins	W 45–10	4–0	Soldier Field	Recap
5	October 6	at Tampa Bay Buccaneers	W 27–19	5–0	Tampa Stadium	Recap
6	October 13	at San Francisco 49ers	W 26–10	6–0	Candlestick Park	Recap
7	October 21	Green Bay Packers	W 23–7	7–0	Soldier Field	Recap
8	October 27	Minnesota Vikings	W 27–9	8–0	Soldier Field	Recap
9	November 3	at Green Bay Packers	W 16–10	9–0	Lambeau Field	Recap
10	November 10	Detroit Lions	W 24–3	10–0	Soldier Field	Recap
11	November 17	at Dallas Cowboys	W 44–0	11–0	Texas Stadium	Recap
12	November 24	Atlanta Falcons	W 36–0	12–0	Soldier Field	Recap
13	December 2	at Miami Dolphins	L 24–38	12–1	Orange Bowl	Recap
14	December 8	Indianapolis Colts	W 17–10	13–1	Soldier Field	Recap
15	December 14	at New York Jets	W 19–6	14–1	The Meadowlands	Recap
16	December 22	at Detroit Lions	W 37–17	15–1	Pontiac Silverdome	Recap

== Game summaries ==
=== Regular season ===
==== Week 1: vs. Buccaneers ====
Week One: Tampa Bay Buccaneers at Chicago Bears – Game summary

Quarter	1	2	3	4	Total
Buccaneers	14	14	0	0	28
Bears	7	10	14	7	38

at Soldier Field, Chicago

- Date: September 8
- Game time: 1:00 p.m. EDT
- Game weather: 90 °F or 32.2 °C, (Thunderstorms)
- Game attendance: 57,828
- Referee: Gene Barth
- TV announcers (CBS): Tim Ryan (play-by-play), Johnny Morris (color commentator)
- Box score (Pro-Football-Reference.com)

Game information
First quarter
- TB – Calvin Magee 1-yard pass from Steve DeBerg (Donald Igwebuike kick). Buccaneers 7-0.
- CHI – Dennis McKinnon 21-yard pass from Jim McMahon (Kevin Butler kick). Tie 7-7.
- TB – Kevin House 44-yard pass from Steve DeBerg (Donald Igwebuike kick). Buccaneers 14-7.

Second quarter

- TB – Jerry Bell 11-yard pass from Steve DeBerg (Donald Igwebuike kick). Buccaneers 21-7.
- CHI – Jim McMahon 1-yard run (Kevin Butler kick). Buccaneers 21-14.
- CHI – Kevin Butler 38-yard field goal. Buccaneers 21-17.
- TB – James Wilder 3-yard run (Donald Igwebuike kick). Buccaneers 28-17.

Third quarter

- CHI – Leslie Frazier 29-yard interception return (Kevin Butler kick). Buccaneers 28-24.
- CHI – Matt Suhey 9-yard pass from Jim McMahon (Kevin Butler kick). Bears 31-28.

Fourth quarter

- CHI – Jim McMahon 1-yard run (Kevin Butler kick). Bears 38-28.

In the season opener against the Bucs, the Bears defense seemed lost for much of the first half of the game by allowing 28 points, and trailed 28–17 at halftime, but the offense was able to lead the Bears to a victory after Jim McMahon scored 3 touchdowns, with Matt Suhey scoring on another. Leslie Frazier was also able to give the Bears defense their first highlight of the season by returning a Steve DeBerg interception 29 yards for a touchdown on the second play of the third quarter. The Bears had allowed 212 yards in the first half, but eventually allowed only 95 in the second half. Walter Payton had rushed for 120 yards on 17 carries, and McMahon completed 23/34 passes for 274 yards, two touchdowns and one interception.

==== Week 2: vs. Patriots ====
Week Two: New England Patriots at Chicago Bears – Game summary

Quarter	1	2	3	4	Total
Patriots	0	0	0	7	7
Bears	7	3	10	0	20

at Soldier Field, Chicago

- Date: September 15
- Game time: 1:00 p.m. EDT
- Game weather: 70 °F or 21.1 °C, (Sunny)
- Game attendance: 60,533
- Referee: Tom Dooley
- TV announcers (NBC): Don Criqui (play-by-play), Bob Trumpy (color commentator)
- Box score (Pro-Football-Reference.com)

Game information
First quarter
- CHI – Dennis McKinnon 21-yard pass from Jim McMahon (Kevin Butler kick). Bears 7-0.

Second quarter

- CHI – Kevin Butler 21-yard field goal. Bears 10-0.

Third quarter

- CHI – Matt Suhey 1-yard run (Kevin Butler kick). Bears 17-0.
- CHI – Kevin Butler 28-yard field goal. Bears 20-0.

Fourth quarter

- NE – Craig James 90-yard pass from Tony Eason (Tony Franklin kick). Bears 20-7.

In the Super Bowl XX preview, the Bears defense was able to find their groove by forcing 4 turnovers by New England and only allowing 7 points.

==== Week 3: at Vikings ====
Week Three: Chicago Bears at Minnesota Vikings – Game summary

Quarter	1	2	3	4	Total
Bears	3	3	24	3	33
Vikings	3	7	7	7	24

at Hubert H. Humphrey Metrodome, Minneapolis, Minnesota

- Date: September 19 (MNF Special Thursday Edition)
- Game time: 8:00 p.m. EDT
- Game weather: Indoors (Dome)
- Game attendance: 61,242
- Referee: Dick Jorgensen
- TV announcers (ABC): Frank Gifford (play-by-play), Joe Namath and O. J. Simpson (color commentators)
- Box score (Pro-Football-Reference.com)

Game information
First quarter
- CHI – Kevin Butler 24-yard field goal. Bears 3-0.
- MIN – Jan Stenerud 25-yard field goal. Tie 3-3.

Second quarter

- CHI – Kevin Butler 19-yard field goal. Bears 6-3.
- MIN – Anthony Carter 14-yard pass from Tommy Kramer (Jan Stenerud kick). Vikings 10-6.

Third quarter

- CHI – Kevin Butler 34-yard field goal. Vikings 10-9.
- MIN – Mike Jones 9-yard pass from Tommy Kramer (Jan Stenerud kick). Vikings 17-9.
- CHI – Willie Gault 70-yard pass from Jim McMahon (Kevin Butler kick). Vikings 17-16.
- CHI – Dennis McKinnon 25-yard pass from Jim McMahon (Kevin Butler kick). Bears 23-17.
- CHI – Dennis McKinnon 43-yard pass from Jim McMahon (Kevin Butler kick). Bears 30-17.

Fourth quarter

- MIN – Anthony Carter 57-yard pass from Tommy Kramer (Jan Stenerud kick). Bears 30-24.
- CHI – Kevin Butler 31-yard field goal. Bears 33-24.

The following week against rival Minnesota, backup quarterback Steve Fuller was called up to take the place of Jim McMahon, who was sidelined with a pinched nerve. With the Bears trailing the Vikings, an anxious McMahon was allowed to return to the game. Without any delay, McMahon famously spearheaded a Bears comeback and victory.

==== Week 4: vs. Redskins ====
Week Four: Washington Redskins at Chicago Bears – Game summary

Quarter	1	2	3	4	Total
Redskins	7	3	0	0	10
Bears	0	31	7	7	45

at Soldier Field, Chicago

- Date: September 29
- Game time: 1:00 p.m. EDT
- Game weather: 75 °F (23.9 °C), (Sunny)
- Game attendance: 63,708
- Referee: Bob Frederic
- TV announcers (CBS): Tim Ryan (play-by-play), Johnny Morris (color commentator)
- Box score (Pro-Football-Reference.com)

Game information
First quarter
- WAS – John Riggins 7-yard run (Mark Moseley kick). Redskins 7-0.

Second quarter

- WAS – Mark Moseley 32-yard field goal. Redskins 10-0.
- CHI – Willie Gault 99-yard kickoff return (Kevin Butler kick). Redskins 10-7.
- CHI – Dennis McKinnon 14-yard pass from Jim McMahon (Kevin Butler kick). Bears 14-10.
- CHI – Emery Moorehead 10-yard pass from Jim McMahon (Kevin Butler kick). Bears 21-10.
- CHI – Jim McMahon 13-yard pass from Walter Payton (Kevin Butler kick). Bears 28-10.
- CHI – Kevin Butler 28-yard field goal. Bears 31-10.

Third quarter

- CHI – Walter Payton 33-yard pass from Jim McMahon (Kevin Butler kick). Bears 38-10.

Fourth quarter

- CHI – Dennis Gentry 1-yard run (Kevin Butler kick). Bears 45-10.

Week 4 saw Chicago trailing 10-0 early to the Joe Theismann-led Washington Redskins. They would score the next forty-five points. One play turned the game, a 99-yard kickoff return by Willie Gault. This cut the lead to 10-7 and importantly, on the play, Washington's punter injured his knee and was sidelined for the remainder of the game. On the next possession, Theismann punted for 1 yard (his only punt in the NFL), and Chicago scored on the very next play to take a 14–10 lead, and they cruised from there – including Walter Payton and Jim McMahon exchanging touchdown passes to one another.

==== Week 5: at Buccaneers ====
Week Five: Chicago Bears at Tampa Bay Buccaneers – Game summary

Quarter	1	2	3	4	Total
Bears	0	3	10	14	27
Buccaneers	0	12	0	7	19

at Tampa Stadium, Tampa, Florida

- Date: October 6
- Game time: 1:00 p.m. EDT
- Game weather: 73 °F (22.8 °C)
- Game attendance: 51,795
- Referee: Pat Haggerty
- TV announcers (CBS): Tim Ryan (play-by-play), Johnny Morris (color commentator)
- Box score (Pro-Football-Reference.com)

Game information
Second quarter
- TB – Donald Igwebuike 19-yard field goal. Buccaneers 3-0.
- TB – Kevin House 21-yard pass from Steve DeBerg (kick failed). Buccaneers 9-0.
- TB – Donald Igwebuike 36-yard field goal. Buccaneers 12-0.
- CHI – Kevin Butler 30-yard field goal. Buccaneers 12-3.

Third quarter

- CHI – Dennis McKinnon 21-yard pass from Jim McMahon (Kevin Butler kick). Buccaneers 12-10.
- CHI – Kevin Butler 31-yard field goal. Bears 13-12.

Fourth quarter

- CHI – Walter Payton 4-yard run (Kevin Butler kick). Bears 20-12.
- TB – Gerald Carter 25-yard pass from Steve DeBerg (Donald Igwebuike kick). Bears 20-19.
- CHI – Walter Payton 9-yard run (Kevin Butler kick). Bears 27-19.

After three second-quarter scoring drives by Tampa Bay, the Bears faced a 12–0 deficit. Kevin Butler's 30-yard field goal got Chicago on the scoreboard before halftime. Jim McMahon's 21-yard pass to Dennis McKinnon opened the second half scoring, and Walter Payton gave the Bears some breathing room with two fourth quarter touchdowns runs.

==== Week 6: at 49ers ====
Week Six: Chicago Bears at San Francisco 49ers – Game summary

Quarter	1	2	3	4	Total
Bears	13	3	0	10	26
49ers	0	10	0	0	10

at Candlestick Park, San Francisco, California

- Date: October 13
- Game time: 1:00 p.m.
- Game weather: 58 °F (14.4 °C)
- Referee: Gordon McCarter
- TV announcers (CBS): Dick Stockton (play by play), Wayne Walker (color commentator)
- Box score (Pro-Football-Reference.com)

Game information
First quarter
- CHI – Walter Payton 3-yard run (Kevin Butler kick). Bears 7-0.
- CHI – Kevin Butler 34-yard field goal. Bears 10-0.
- CHI – Kevin Butler 38-yard field goal. Bears 13-0.

Second quarter

- CHI – Kevin Butler 27-yard field goal. Bears 16-0.
- SF – Carlton Williamson 43-yard interception return (Ray Wersching kick). Bears 16-7.
- SF – Ray Wersching 32-yard field goal. Bears 16-10.

Fourth quarter

- CHI – Kevin Butler 27-yard field goal. Bears 19-10.
- CHI – Walter Payton 17-yard run (Kevin Butler kick). Bears 26-10.

Nine months after their humiliating defeat at the hands of the 49ers in the NFC Championship Game, the Bears claimed their revenge by sacking Joe Montana a then-career high seven times. In return for 49ers coach Bill Walsh’s idea of sending lineman Guy McIntyre in as fullback the season before, Mike Ditka sent in rookie William Perry, but as a runner rather than a blocker. Shortly after the game and the flight back to Chicago, Ditka was arrested for DWI.

This was the Bears’ last victory at Candlestick Park, and their last win in the Bay Area until 2014 at Levi's Stadium.

==== Week 7: vs. Packers ====
Week Seven: Green Bay Packers at Chicago Bears – Game summary

Quarter	1	2	3	4	Total
Packers	7	0	0	0	7
Bears	0	21	0	2	23

at Soldier Field, Chicago

- Date: October 21
- Game time: 8:00 p.m.
- Game weather: 54 °F or 12.2 °C (Cloudy)
- Game attendance: 65,095
- Referee: Chuck Heberling
- TV announcers (ABC): Frank Gifford (play-by-play), Joe Namath and O. J. Simpson (color commentators)
- Box score (Pro-Football-Reference.com)

Game information
First quarter
- GB – James Lofton 27-yard pass from Lynn Dickey (Al Del Greco kick). Packers 7-0.

Second quarter

- CHI – Walter Payton 3-yard run (Kevin Butler kick). Tie 7-7.
- CHI – William Perry 2-yard run (Kevin Butler kick). Bears 14-7.
- CHI – Walter Payton 1-yard run (Kevin Butler kick). Bears 21-7.

Fourth quarter

- CHI – Safety, Jim Zorn sacked in end zone by Otis Wilson. Bears 23-7.

The Bears defeated the Packers on Monday Night Football in a decisive 23–7 victory, with Perry becoming a folk hero after scoring his first career touchdown on a 1-yard run.

==== Week 8: vs. Vikings ====
Week Eight: Minnesota Vikings at Chicago Bears – Game summary

Quarter	1	2	3	4	Total
Vikings	0	7	0	2	9
Bears	10	3	7	7	27

at Soldier Field, Chicago

- Date: October 27
- Game time: 12:00 p.m.
- Game weather: 62 °F or 16.7 °C (Sunny)
- Game attendance: 63,815
- Referee: Fred Wyant
- TV announcers (CBS): Tim Ryan (play-by-play), Johnny Morris (color commentator)
- Box score (Pro-Football-Reference.com)

Game information
First quarter
- CHI – Dennis McKinnon 33-yard pass from Jim McMahon (Kevin Butler kick). Bears 7-0.
- CHI – Kevin Butler 40-yard field goal. Bears 10-0.

Second quarter

- MIN – Darrin Nelson 1-yard run (Jan Stenerud kick) Bears 10-7.
- CHI – Kevin Butler 29-yard field goal. Bears 13-7.

Third quarter

- CHI – Otis Wilson 23-yard interception return (Kevin Butler kick). Bears 20-7.

Fourth quarter

- CHI – Walter Payton 20-yard pass from Jim McMahon (Kevin Butler kick). Bears 27-7.
- MIN – Safety, Steve Fuller tackled in end zone. Bears 27-9.

Walter Payton racked up 155 yards (rushing and receiving) and caught one of two TD passes Jim McMahon threw on the day. The defense forced five turnovers, one of which was a pick-six by Otis Wilson, as Chicago moved to 8–0.

==== Week 9: at Packers ====
Week Nine: Chicago Bears at Green Bay Packers – Game summary

Quarter	1	2	3	4	Total
Bears	0	7	0	9	16
Packers	3	0	7	0	10

at Lambeau Field, Green Bay, Wisconsin

- Date: November 3
- Game time: 12:00 p.m.
- Game weather: 42 °F (5.6 °C)
- Game attendance: 55,343
- Referee: Bob McElwee
- TV announcers (CBS): Tim Ryan (play-by-play), Johnny Morris (color commentator)
- Box score (Pro-Football-Reference.com)

Game information
First quarter
- GB – Al Del Greco 40-yard field goal. Packers 3-0.

Second quarter

- CHI – William Perry 4-yard pass from Jim McMahon (Kevin Butler kick). Bears 7-3.

Third quarter

- GB – Jessie Clark 55-yard pass from Jim Zorn (Al Del Greco kick). Packers 10-7.

Fourth quarter

- CHI – Safety, Jim Zorn sacked in end zone by Steve McMichael (Kevin Butler kick). Packers 10-9.
- CHI – Walter Payton 27-yard run (Kevin Butler kick). Bears 16-10.

The Packers increased tensions in the Bears–Packers rivalry after putting horse manure in the Bears locker room. However, the Bears had the last laugh against their hated rival, winning 16–10, and Perry scored his first career receiving touchdown along the way. Green Bay's Mark Lee and Ken Stills intensified the game after Lee sent Payton over a bench and Stills leveled Matt Suhey. With the Bears in trouble and trailing 10–7 in the 4th quarter, a Steve McMichael safety proved to be the key play that turned the game. This cut the lead to 10-9 and the Bears got the ball at midfield following the safety free kick. On the ensuing drive, Walter Payton sealed the victory with a 27-yard touchdown run, putting Chicago up for keeps 16–10.

==== Week 10: vs. Lions ====
Week Ten: Detroit Lions at Chicago Bears – Game summary

Quarter	1	2	3	4	Total
Lions	0	0	3	0	3
Bears	7	7	7	3	24

at Soldier Field, Chicago

- Date: November 10
- Game time: 12:00 p.m.
- Game weather: 37 °F or 2.8 °C (Light Rain)
- Game attendance: 53,467
- Referee: Tom Dooley
- TV announcers (CBS): Tim Ryan (play-by-play), Johnny Morris (color commentator)
- Box score (Pro-Football-Reference.com)

Game information
First quarter
- CHI – Steve Fuller 1-yard run (Kevin Butler kick). Bears 7-0.

Second quarter

- CHI – Calvin Thomas 7-yard run (Kevin Butler kick). Bears 14-0.

Third quarter

- DET – Eddie Murray 34-yard field goal. Bears 14-3.
- CHI – Steve Fuller 5-yard run (Kevin Butler kick). Bears 21-3.

Fourth quarter

- CHI – Kevin Butler 39-yard field goal. Bears 24-3.

The Bears defeated the Lions 24–3, while Walter Payton and Matt Suhey ran for 105 and 102 yards, respectively. This was the last time the Bears had two 100-yard rushers in a game until November 28, 2025.

==== Week 11: at Cowboys ====
Week Eleven: Chicago Bears at Dallas Cowboys – Game summary

Quarter	1	2	3	4	Total
Bears	7	17	3	17	44
Cowboys	0	0	0	0	0

at Texas Stadium, Irving, Texas

- Date: November 17
- Game time: 12:00 p.m.
- Game weather: 57 °F (13.9 °C)
- Game attendance: 63,855
- Referee: Gene Barth
- TV announcers (CBS): Pat Summerall (play-by-play) and John Madden (color commentator)
- Box score (Pro-Football-Reference.com)

Game information
First quarter
- CHI – Richard Dent 1-yard interception return (Kevin Butler kick). Bears 7-0.

Second quarter

- CHI – Kevin Butler 44-yard field goal. Bears 10-0.
- CHI – Mike Richardson 36-yard interception return (Kevin Butler kick). Bears 17-0.
- CHI – Steve Fuller 1-yard run (Kevin Butler kick). Bears 24-0.

Third quarter

- CHI – Kevin Butler 46-yard field goal. Bears 27-0.

Fourth quarter

- CHI – Kevin Butler 22-yard field goal. Bears 30-0.
- CHI – Calvin Thomas 17-yard run (Kevin Butler kick). Bears 37-0.
- CHI – Dennis Gentry 16-yard run (Kevin Butler kick). Bears 44-0.

In a student vs teacher matchup, the Bears shut out the Cowboys, handing them the worst loss in franchise history, as well as the first time they were shut out in 15 years. The win also gave the Bears the NFC Central division title. Coach Ditka acknowledged feeling crushed when Coach Landry complimented his team after the game.

==== Week 12: vs. Falcons ====
Week Twelve: Atlanta Falcons at Chicago Bears – Game summary

Quarter	1	2	3	4	Total
Falcons	0	0	0	0	0
Bears	0	20	7	9	36

at Soldier Field, Chicago

- Date: November 24
- Game time: 12:00 p.m.
- Game weather: 27 °F or −2.8 °C (Cloudy)
- Game attendance: 61,769
- Referee: Dick Jorgensen
- TV announcers (CBS): Pat Summerall (play-by-play) and John Madden (color commentator)
- Box score (Pro-Football-Reference.com)

Game information
Second quarter
- CHI – Kevin Butler 35-yard field goal. Bears 3-0.
- CHI – Kevin Butler 32-yard field goal. Bears 6-0.
- CHI – Walter Payton 40-yard run (Kevin Butler kick). Bears 13-0.
- CHI – William Perry 1-yard run (Kevin Butler kick). Bears 20-0.

Third quarter

- CHI – Calvin Thomas 2-yard run (Kevin Butler kick). Bears 27-0.

Fourth quarter

- CHI – Safety, Bob Holly tackled by Henry Waechter in end zone. Bears 29-0.
- CHI – Thomas Sanders 1-yard run (Kevin Butler kick). Bears 36-0.

In the coldest game of the season, the Bears recorded their second straight shutout, and third straight game without giving up a touchdown, against Atlanta, with defensive lineman Henry Waechter sacking Bob Holly in the endzone for a safety.

==== Week 13: at Dolphins ====
Week Thirteen: Chicago Bears at Miami Dolphins – Game summary

Quarter	1	2	3	4	Total
Bears	7	3	14	0	24
Dolphins	10	21	7	0	38

at Orange Bowl, Miami, Florida

- Date: December 2
- Game time: 8:00 p.m.
- Game weather: 76 °F (24.4 °C)
- Game attendance: 75,594
- Referee: Gordon McCarter
- TV announcers (ABC): Frank Gifford (play-by-play), Joe Namath and O. J. Simpson (color commentators)
- Box score (Pro-Football-Reference.com)

Game information
First quarter
- MIA – Nat Moore 33-yard pass from Dan Marino (Fuad Reveiz kick). Dolphins 7-0.
- CHI – Steve Fuller 1-yard run (Kevin Butler kick). Tie 7-7.
- MIA – Fuad Reveiz 47-yard field goal. Dolphins 10-7.

Second quarter

- MIA – Ron Davenport 1-yard run (Fuad Reveiz kick). Dolphins 17-7.
- CHI – Kevin Butler 30-yard field goal. Dolphins 17-10.
- MIA – Ron Davenport 1-yard run (Fuad Reveiz kick). Dolphins 24-10.
- MIA – Nat Moore 6-yard pass from Dan Marino (Fuad Reveiz kick). Dolphins 31-10.

Third quarter

- CHI – Steve Fuller 1-yard run (Kevin Butler kick). Dolphins 31-17.
- MIA – Mark Clayton 42-yard pass from Dan Marino (Fuad Reveiz kick). Dolphins 38-17.
- CHI – Ken Margerum 19-yard pass from Steve Fuller (Kevin Butler kick). Dolphins 38-24.

The Bears’ hopes for a perfect season were thwarted when Dan Marino and the Dolphins defeated the McMahon-less Bears on Monday Night Football, 38–24. The Dolphins' victory persevered their 1972 season as the only undefeated regular season in the NFL since the AFL–NFL merger, a feat that would not be equaled until 2007 when the 2007 New England Patriots went undefeated through the regular season. Miami struck first when Marino hit Nat Moore for a 33-yard touchdown. Bears backup Steve Fuller then threw a 69-yard pass to Willie Gault, and eventually snuck in for a 1-yard touchdown. After a Fuad Reveiz field goal to put Miami up 10–7, Marino hit Moore again that set up a Ron Davenport touchdown to increase the gap by 10 points. After the Bears scored on a Kevin Butler field goal, Marino hit Mark Duper on a crossing pattern for 52 yards. On 3rd and 7, he connected with Mark Clayton for 26 yards down to the Bears 1-yard line. Davenport then ran in, and the Dolphins led 24–10. Later, the Dolphins would increase their lead to 31–10. The Bears had not allowed 31 points in one half since the 1972 season opener. The Bears then scored in the third quarter, but any momentum they gained was lost when Butler muffed the ensuing kickoff, which Dolphins rookie Alex Moyer recovered at the Bears 46. Dan Hampton then tipped a Marino pass into the air, but it sailed downfield for 30 yards before landing in the hands of Clayton, who went into the end zone to make it 38–17. Fuller hit Ken Margerum for a 19-yard touchdown, but that would be the last score of the night for the Bears. Mike Singletary said in America's Game: 1985 Chicago Bears:

Well needless to say, there was something different about that game, and there were some things happen that night, that were really strange. I mean balls ricocheting off guys heads and flying into receivers hands. You couldn't buy a break, it was like a nightmare, when something is happening and you’re in the middle of it, and you’re thinking this can't be happening, please let this be a dream.

The day after this loss, the Bears filmed the video for "The Super Bowl Shuffle", a Grammy Award-nominated and Billboard charts #41 charting rap single that delivered over $300,000 to the Chicago Community Trust.

==== Week 14: vs. Colts ====
Week Fourteen: Indianapolis Colts at Chicago Bears – Game summary

Quarter	1	2	3	4	Total
Colts	0	3	0	7	10
Bears	0	3	7	7	17

at Soldier Field, Chicago

- Date: December 8
- Game time: 12:00 p.m.
- Game weather: 42 °F or 5.6 °C (Fog)
- Game attendance: 59,997
- Referee: Ben Dreith
- TV announcers (NBC): Don Criqui (play-by-play), Bob Trumpy (color commentator)
- Box score (Pro-Football-Reference.com)

Game information
Second quarter
- CHI – Kevin Butler 20-yard field goal. Bears 3-0.
- IND – Raul Allegre 30-yard field goal. Tie 3-3.

Third quarter

- CHI – Walter Payton 16-yard run (Kevin Butler kick). Bears 10-3.

Fourth quarter

- CHI – Calvin Thomas 3-yard run (Kevin Butler kick). Bears 17-3.
- IND – Wayne Capers 61-yard pass from Mike Pagel (Raul Allegre kick). Bears 17-10.

The 12–1 Bears hosted the 3–10 Colts and were 20-point favorites in week 14. The Colts marched the ball 72 yards to the Chicago one-yard line on the first drive of the game. But on third and goal, Gary Fencik stuffed a pitch play for a five-yard loss and the Colts' kicker missed a 22-yard-field goal attempt wide left. Both teams struggled to a 3-3 halftime score as Indianapolis outgained Chicago in the half. Chicago finally pulled ahead on a 16-yard Walter Payton TD run near the end of the third quarter and held on for a 17–10 victory.

==== Week 15: at Jets ====
Week Fifteen: Chicago Bears at New York Jets – Game summary

Quarter	1	2	3	4	Total
Bears	3	7	3	6	19
Jets	3	0	3	0	6

at Giants Stadium, East Rutherford, New Jersey

- Date: December 14
- Game time: 12:30 p.m.
- Game weather: 36 °F or 2.2 °C
- Game attendance: 74,752
- Referee: Fred Wyant
- TV announcers (CBS): Pat Summerall (play-by-play) and John Madden (color commentator)
- Box score (Pro-Football-Reference.com)

Game information
First quarter
- CHI – Kevin Butler 18-yard field goal. Bears 3-0.
- NYJ – Pat Leahy 23-yard field goal. Tie 3-3.

Second quarter

- CHI – Tim Wrightman 7-yard pass from Jim McMahon (Kevin Butler kick). Bears 10-3.

Third quarter

- NYJ – Pat Leahy 55-yard field goal. Bears 10-6.
- CHI – Kevin Butler 31-yard field goal. Bears 13-6.

Fourth quarter

- CHI – Kevin Butler 37-yard field goal. Bears 16-6.
- CHI – Kevin Butler 21-yard field goal. Bears 19-6.

A second quarter TD reception by tight end Tim Wrightman and four field goals from Kevin Butler were plenty to complement the Bears' defensive dominance.

==== Week 16: at Lions ====
Week Sixteen: Chicago Bears at Detroit Lions – Game summary

Quarter	1	2	3	4	Total
Bears	3	3	10	21	37
Lions	3	0	7	7	17

at Pontiac Silverdome, Pontiac, Michigan

- Date: December 22
- Game time: 12:30 p.m.
- Game weather: Indoors (dome)
- Game attendance: 74,042
- Referee: Fred Silva
- TV announcers (CBS): Tim Ryan (play-by-play), Johnny Morris (color commentator)
- Box score (Pro-Football-Reference.com)

Game information
First quarter
- CHI – Kevin Butler 25-yard field goal. Bears 3-0.
- DET – Eddie Murray 42-yard field goal. Tie 3-3.

Second quarter

- CHI – Kevin Butler 24-yard field goal. Bears 6-3.

Third quarter

- CHI – Dennis Gentry 94-yard kickoff return (Kevin Butler kick). Bears 13-3.
- CHI – Kevin Butler 21-yard field goal. Bears 16-3.
- DET – David Lewis 2-yard pass from Eric Hipple (Eddie Murray kick). Bears 16-10.

Fourth quarter

- CHI – Jim McMahon 14-yard run (Kevin Butler kick). Bears 23-10.
- CHI – Ron Rivera 5-yard fumble return (Kevin Butler kick). Bears 30-10.
- DET – James Jones 2-yard run (Eddie Murray kick). Bears 30-17.
- CHI – Ken Margerum 11-yard pass from Jim McMahon (Kevin Butler kick). Bears 37-17.

Chicago never trailed in their regular season finale and scored 31 second-half points. The game featured a hit on Lions quarterback Joe Ferguson where he was knocked unconscious by Bears linebacker Wilber Marshall.

== Standings ==
NFC Central
	W	L	T	PCT	DIV	CONF	PF	PA	STK
^{(1)} Chicago Bears	15	1	0	.938	8–0	12–0	456	198	W3
Green Bay Packers	8	8	0	.500	6–2	8–4	337	355	W2
Minnesota Vikings	7	9	0	.438	3–5	5–9	346	359	L2
Detroit Lions	7	9	0	.438	2–6	5–7	307	366	L3
Tampa Bay Buccaneers	2	14	0	.125	1–7	2–10	294	448	L4

== Playoffs ==
Round	Date	Opponent (seed)	Result	Record	Venue
Divisional Round	January 5, 1986	New York Giants (4)	W 21–0	1–0	Soldier Field
NFC Championship	January 12, 1986	Los Angeles Rams (2)	W 24–0	2–0	Soldier Field
Super Bowl XX	January 26, 1986	New England Patriots (A5)	W 46–10	3–0	Louisiana Superdome

Divisional Round: New York Giants at Chicago Bears – Game summary

Quarter	1	2	3	4	Total
Giants	0	0	0	0	0
Bears	7	0	14	0	21

at Soldier Field, Chicago

- Date: January 5
- Game time: 12:30 p.m.
- Game weather: 18 °F (−7.8 °C), wind 16 miles per hour (26 km/h; 14 kn), wind chill 3 °F or −16.1 °C
- Game attendance: 62,076
- Referee: Ben Dreith
- TV announcers (CBS): Pat Summerall (play-by-play) and John Madden (color commentator)
- Pro-Football-Reference.com

Game information
First quarter
- CHI – Shaun Gayle 5-yard punt return (Kevin Butler kick). Bears 7-0.

Second quarter

Third quarter

- CHI – Dennis McKinnon 23-yard pass from Jim McMahon (Kevin Butler kick). Bears 14-0.
- CHI – Dennis McKinnon 20-yard pass from Jim McMahon (Kevin Butler kick). Bears 21-0.

Fourth quarter

The Bears' defense dominated the game by allowing only 32 rushing yards and sacked Giants quarterback Phil Simms for 60 yards. Simms was 14/35 for 209 yards while running back Joe Morris, the NFL's regular-season touchdown leader, finished with 32 yards on 12 carries. Chicago's first touchdown resulted on a New York punt attempt from their own 12-yard line. The wind, blowing at 13 mph, caught the ball just enough for punter Sean Landeta to completely miss it, and Shaun Gayle picked it up and ran 5 yards for a touchdown. Bears quarterback Jim McMahon later threw two touchdown passes in the third quarter, both to Dennis McKinnon. McMahon finished the game with 216 passing yards, while running back Walter Payton rushed for 94 yards.

NFC Championship: Los Angeles Rams at Chicago Bears – Game summary

Quarter	1	2	3	4	Total
Rams	0	0	0	0	0
Bears	10	0	7	7	24

at Soldier Field, Chicago

- Date: January 12
- Game time: 12:30 p.m.
- Game weather: 36 °F (2.2 °C), wind 19 miles per hour (31 km/h; 17 kn), wind chill 26 °F or −3.3 °C
- Game attendance: 65,522
- Referee: Jim Tunney
- TV announcers (CBS): Pat Summerall (play-by-play) and John Madden (color commentator)
- Pro-Football-Reference.com

Game information
First quarter
- CHI – Jim McMahon 16-yard run (Kevin Butler kick). Bears 7-0.
- CHI – Kevin Butler 34-yard field goal. Bears 10-0.

Second quarter

Third quarter

- CHI – Willie Gault 22-yard pass from Jim McMahon (Kevin Butler kick). Bears 17-0.

Fourth quarter

- CHI – Wilber Marshall 52-yard fumble return (Kevin Butler kick). Bears 24-0.

At the start of the week leading up to the NFC Championship Game, Ditka commented on what he perceived as the NFL's unfavorable treatment of his team by famously stating, "I don't think we come in great favor with certain people. I think it's the same reason people look with disfavor on the Raiders. There are some teams that are fair-haired; there are some teams that are not fair-haired. There are teams named Smith; there are teams named Grabowski. The Rams are a Smith. We're a Grabowski."

The Bears' defense once again dominated the game by limiting Rams running back Eric Dickerson to 46 yards, and holding quarterback Dieter Brock to 10 out of 31 completions for 66 passing yards. Los Angeles only gained 130 yards of total offense. Chicago quarterback Jim McMahon scored on a 16-yard touchdown run in the first quarter, and later threw a 22-yard touchdown pass to Willie Gault in the third quarter. Kicker Kevin Butler kicked a 34-yard field goal in the first period. In the fourth quarter, defensive lineman Richard Dent forced Brock to fumble, and linebacker Wilber Marshall picked up the loose ball and returned it 52 yards for a touchdown.

=== Super Bowl ===
Super Bowl XX: Chicago Bears vs. New England Patriots – Game summary

Quarter	1	2	3	4	Total
Bears	13	10	21	2	46
Patriots	3	0	0	7	10

at Louisiana Superdome, New Orleans, Louisiana

- Date: January 26
- Game time: 5:25 p.m.
- Game weather: Indoors (dome)
- Game attendance: 73,818
- Referee: Red Cashion
- TV announcers (NBC): Dick Enberg (play-by-play), Merlin Olsen, and Bob Griese (color commentators)
- Pro-Football-Reference.com

Game information
First quarter
- NE – Tony Franklin 36-yard field goal. Patriots 3-0.
- CHI – Kevin Butler 28-yard field goal. Tie 3-3.
- CHI – Kevin Butler 24-yard field goal. Bears 6-3.
- CHI – Matt Suhey 11-yard run (Kevin Butler kick). Bears 13-3.

Second quarter

- CHI – Jim McMahon 2-yard run (Kevin Butler kick). Bears 20-3.
- CHI – Kevin Butler 24-yard field goal. Bears 23-3.

Third quarter

- CHI – Jim McMahon 1 yard run (Kevin Butler kick). Bears 30-3.
- CHI – Reggie Phillips 28-yard interception return (Kevin Butler kick). Bears 37-3.
- CHI – William Perry 1 yard run (Kevin Butler kick). Bears 44-3.

Fourth quarter

- NE – Irving Fryar 8-yard pass from Steve Grogan (Tony Franklin kick). Bears 44-10.
- CHI – Safety, Steve Grogan tackled by Henry Waechter in end zone. Bears 46-10.

The Patriots took a quick lead after linebacker Larry McGrew recovered a fumble from Walter Payton at the Chicago 19-yard line on the second play of the game, setting up Tony Franklin's 36-yard field goal 1:19 into the first quarter. The Bears struck back with a 7-play, 59-yard drive, featuring a 43-yard pass completion from Jim McMahon to wide receiver Willie Gault, to set up a field goal from Kevin Butler, tying the score 3–3.

After both teams traded punts, Richard Dent and linebacker Wilber Marshall shared a sack on Eason, forcing a fumble that lineman Dan Hampton recovered on the Patriots 13-yard line. Chicago then drove to the 3-yard line, but had to settle for another field goal from Butler after rookie defensive lineman William "Refrigerator" Perry was tackled for a 1-yard loss while trying to throw his first NFL pass on a halfback option play. On the Patriots' ensuing drive, Dent forced running back Craig James to fumble, which was recovered by linebacker Mike Singletary at the 13-yard line. Two plays later, Bears fullback Matt Suhey scored on an 11-yard touchdown run to increase the lead to 13–3.

New England took the ensuing kickoff and ran one play before the first quarter ended, which resulted in positive yardage for the first time in the game (a 3-yard run by James). But after an incomplete pass and a 4-yard loss, they had to send in punter Rich Camarillo again, and receiver Keith Ortego returned the ball 12 yards to the 41-yard line. The Bears subsequently drove 59 yards in 10 plays, featuring a 24-yard reception by Suhey, to score on McMahon's 2-yard touchdown run to increase their lead, 20–3. After the ensuing kickoff, New England lost 13 yards in 3 plays and had to punt again, but got the ball back with great field position when defensive back Raymond Clayborn recovered a fumble from Suhey at their own 46-yard line. Patriots coach Raymond Berry then replaced Eason with Steve Grogan to see if he could spark the Patriots offense. But Grogan could only lead them to the 37-yard line and they decided to punt rather than risk a 55-yard field goal attempt. The Bears then marched 72 yards in 11 plays, moving the ball inside the Patriots 10-yard line. New England kept them out of the end zone, but Butler kicked his third field goal on the last play of the half to give Chicago a 23–3 halftime lead.

The Bears had absolutely dominated New England in the first half, holding them to 21 offensive plays (only 4 of which resulted in positive yardage), −19 total offensive yards, 2 pass completions, 1 first down, and 3 points. Meanwhile, Chicago gained 236 yards and scored 23 points themselves.

After the Patriots received the second-half opening kickoff, they managed to get one first down, but then had to punt after Grogan was sacked twice. Camarillo, who punted 4 times in the first half, managed to pin the Bears back at their own 4-yard line with a Super Bowl record 62-yard punt. But the Patriots defense still had no ability to stop Chicago's offense. On their very first play, McMahon faked a handoff to Payton, then threw a 60-yard completion to Gault. Eight plays later, McMahon finished the Super Bowl record 96-yard drive with a 1-yard touchdown run to make the Bears lead 30–3. On New England's second drive of the period, Chicago cornerback Reggie Phillips intercepted a pass from Grogan and returned it 28 yards for a touchdown to increase the lead to 37–3.

On the second play of their ensuing possession, the Patriots turned the ball over again, when receiver Cedric Jones lost a fumble after catching a 19-yard pass from Grogan. A few plays later, McMahon's 27-yard completion to receiver Dennis Gentry moved the ball to the 1-yard line, setting up perhaps the most memorable moment of the game. William "the Refrigerator" Perry was brought on to score on offense, as he had done twice in the regular season. His touchdown made the score 44–3.

The Patriots finally scored a touchdown early in the fourth quarter, advancing the ball 76 yards in 12 plays and scoring on an 8-yard pass from Grogan to receiver Irving Fryar. But the Bears defense dominated New England for the rest of the game, forcing another fumble, another interception, and defensive lineman Henry Waechter's sack on Grogan in the end zone for a safety to make the final score 46–10.

One oddity in the Bears victory was that Payton had a relatively poor performance statistically running the ball and never scored a touchdown in Super Bowl XX, his first and only Super Bowl appearance in a Hall of Fame career. However, if one views the game and watches the Patriots' defense, it is clear that their primary goal was stopping Payton and he frequently had three and four defenders keyed on him on nearly every play. This allowed the rest of the Bears' offense far more opportunities to score than had the Patriots employed a more balanced defense. Ultimately Payton was the Bears' leading rusher during the game, but the Patriots defense held him to only 61 yards on 22 carries, with his longest run being only 7 yards. He was given several opportunities to score near the goal line, but New England stopped him every time before he reached the end zone (such as his 2-yard loss from the New England 3-yard line a few plays before Butler's second field goal, and his 2-yard run from the 4-yard line right before McMahon's first rushing touchdown). Thus, Chicago head coach Mike Ditka opted to go for other plays to counter the Patriots defense. Perry's touchdown and McMahon's rushing touchdowns are widely considered as scoring opportunities that were denied to Payton. Ditka has since gone on record stating that his biggest regret of his career was not creating a scoring opportunity for Payton during the game.

McMahon, who completed 12 out of 20 passes for 256 yards, became the first quarterback in a Super Bowl to score 2 rushing touchdowns. Bears receiver Willie Gault finished the game with 129 receiving yards on just 4 receptions, an average of over 32.2 yards per catch. He also returned 4 kickoffs for 49 yards. Suhey had 11 carries for 52 yards and a touchdown, and caught a pass for 24 yards. Singletary tied a Super Bowl record with 2 fumble recoveries.

Eason became the first Super Bowl starting quarterback to fail to complete a pass, going 0 for 6 attempts. The Bears also dominated Patriots starting running back James, holding him to 1 yard on 5 carries, with 1 fumble. Grogan completed 17 out of 30 passes for 177 yards and 1 touchdown, with 2 interceptions. Although Fullback Tony Collins was the Patriots leading rusher, he was limited to just 4 yards on 3 carries, and caught 2 passes for 19 yards. New England receiver Stephen Starring returned 7 kickoffs for 153 yards and caught 2 passes for 39 yards.

The Bears held a victory parade in the Chicago Loop on January 27, missing by several hours the Space Shuttle Challenger disaster that would ultimately make the win an afterthought in the American public.

== Notable moments ==
=== Statistics ===
The Bears were first in scoring defense, allowing only 198 points in the regular season with an average of allowing only 12.4 points/game, as well as scoring more points than given up. The 198 points allowed were 65 less than the second-most allowed that year, while the point differential of plus-258 is 110 more than the second-ranked differential and the third-highest in NFL history. They were also second in scoring with 456 points (28.5 points/game), trailing only the Chargers that season. They also led the league in turnover differential at plus-23. The team also had 4 shutouts, two in the regular season over the Dallas Cowboys, and Atlanta Falcons, followed by the New York Giants and Los Angeles Rams in the postseason.

=== The defense ===
The Bears' 46 defense (named after the jersey number of former Bears' safety, Doug Plank), led by mercurial defensive coordinator Buddy Ryan, was an "attack from all angles" scheme. With future Hall of Famer Mike Singletary (#50) flanked by Wilber Marshall (#58) and Otis Wilson (#55), the linebacking unit ranked in at #5 of the greatest linebacking corps in NFL history in NFL Top 10. Coupled with a backfield featuring safeties Gary Fencik (FS) and Dave Duerson (22), as well as a defensive line that included future Hall of Famers Richard Dent (#95), Dan "Danimal" Hampton (#99), and Steve McMichael (#76) along with William "The Refrigerator" Perry (#72).

A hit by Marshall where he knocked Detroit Lions quarterback Joe Ferguson unconscious is still replayed as an example of the team's playing style.

The irony of the defense's success was that two of the Bears' top defensive players, linebacker Al Harris and strong safety Todd Bell, missed the entire season due to contract disputes.

=== Chicago Honey Bears ===
The 1985 season was the team's cheerleading squad Chicago Honey Bears' final season with the team, as team owner Virginia Halas McCaskey eventually severed all ties with them.

=== The Super Bowl Shuffle ===
After the loss to the Miami Dolphins, most of the team recorded the song The Super Bowl Shuffle (defensive lineman Dan Hampton refused to participate due to the song's arrogance), becoming the first sports team to record a rap song (The 49ers recorded a post-disco song the year before). The song's popularity led to it being #41 on the US Billboard Hot 100, and the song funded $300,000 in profit for the Chicago Community Trust to help needy families in Chicago with clothing, shelter, and food, hence Walter Payton's rap lyric: "now we're not doing this because we're greedy, the Bears are doing it to feed the needy".

=== 2011 White House visit ===
'1985 Chicago Bears Visit the White House' - video from White House

In 2011, the Bears made their visit to the White House, 25 years after their originally intended visit was cancelled due to the Challenger explosion, as former President Barack Obama is a Bears fan. At that time, Obama called them the greatest team ever; however, he called his own words into question when hosting the 1972 Dolphins, the only NFL team with a perfect season. Obama noted that the only loss the 1985 Bears had was to the Dolphins.

== Honors and achievements ==
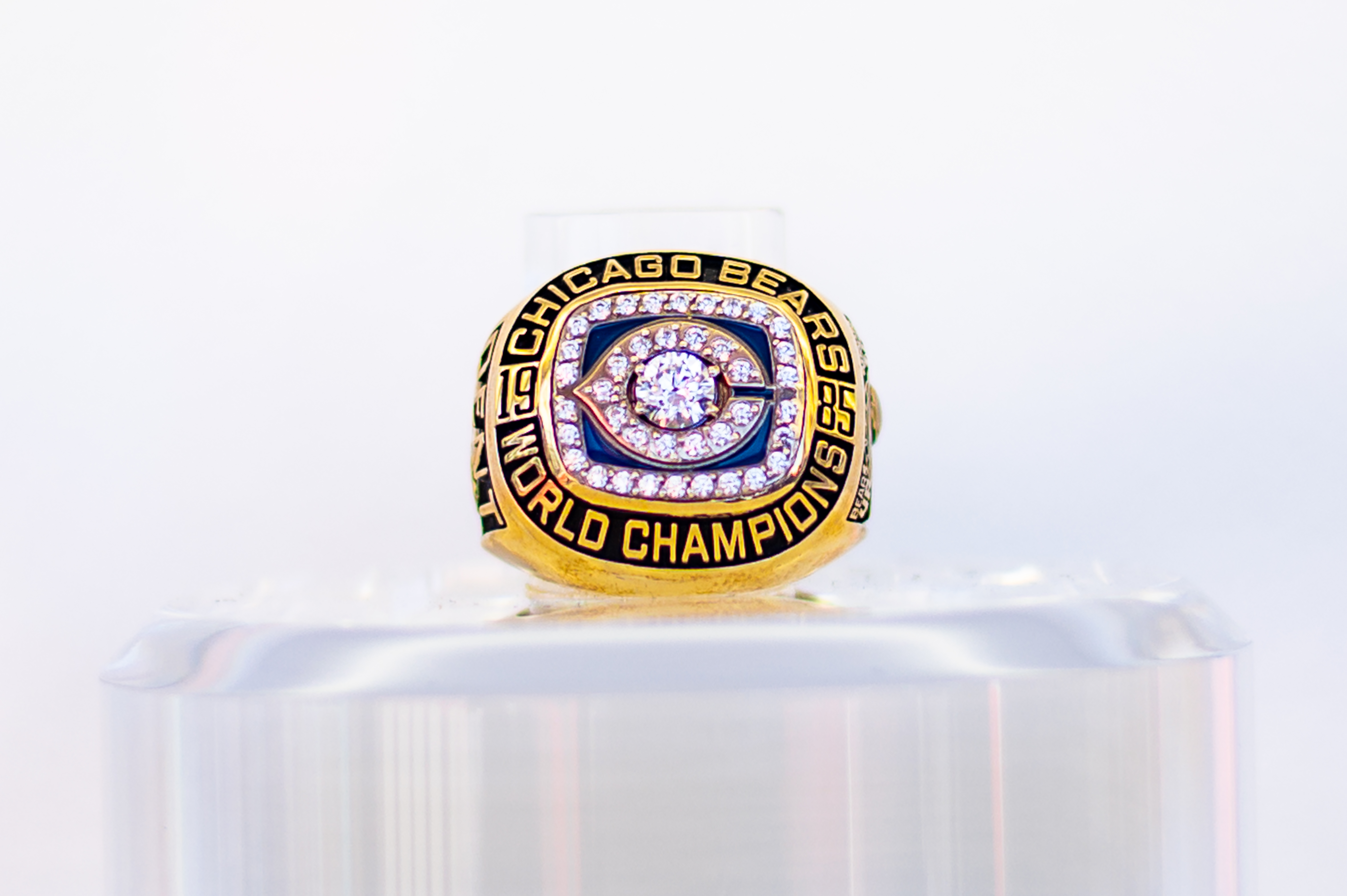
The Super Bowl XX championship ring

=== Awards ===
- NFL Champions (9)
- National Football Conference Championship
- NFC Central Division Championship
- Richard Dent, Super Bowl XX Most Valuable Player
- Mike Ditka, 1985 AP NFL Coach of Year
- Mike Ditka, 1985 Sporting News NFL Coach of Year
- Mike Ditka, 1985 UPI NFL Coach of Year
- Walter Payton, Bert Bell Award
- Walter Payton, UPI NFC Player of the Year, Offense
- Mike Singletary, National Football League Defensive Player of the Year Award
- Mike Singletary, UPI NFC Player of the Year, Defense
- Mike Singletary, NFC Defensive Player of the Year

=== Hall of Famers ===
- 1988 Enshrinement Mike Ditka: 1961–1966 (player)
- 1993 Enshrinement Walter Payton: 1975–1987
- 1998 Enshrinement Mike Singletary: 1981–1992
- 2002 Enshrinement Dan Hampton: 1979–1990
- 2011 Enshrinement Richard Dent: 1983–1993, 1995
- 2020 Enshrinement Jim Covert: 1983–1991
- 2024 Enshrinement Steve McMichael: 1980-1994

=== Players that became coaches ===
- Mike Singletary, Head Coach of the San Francisco 49ers (2008–2010); Minnesota Vikings (2011–2013; assistant head coach/linebackers coach)
- Leslie Frazier, Head Coach of the Minnesota Vikings (2010–2013)
- Ron Rivera, Defensive coordinator of the Bears (2004–2006); Head Coach of the Carolina Panthers (2011–2019); Head Coach of the Washington Redskins / Football Team / Commanders (2019–2023)
- Brian Cabral, Interim Head Coach of the Colorado Buffaloes (2010)
- Steve McMichael, Head Coach Chicago Slaughter, CIFL (2007–2013)
- Dennis Gentry, Running Backs Coach Chicago Enforcers, XFL (2001)
- Jeff Fisher, Head Coach of the Tennessee Titans (1994–2010); St. Louis/Los Angeles Rams (2012–2016)

== Notes ==
- ^{a1} Kazor also served as the team's special teams coach, defensive assistant, and tight ends coach
