= The Super Bowl Shuffle =

Song and music video performed by the 1985 Chicago Bears

Single by the Chicago Bears Shufflin' Crew
- Released: December 11, 1985
- Recorded: December 3, 1985
- Genre: Hip hop; novelty; Old-school hip hop
- Length: 5:50
- Label: Red Label
- Songwriters: Bobby Daniels; Lloyd Barry (music); Richard E. Meyer; Melvin Owens (lyrics)
- Producer: Richard E. Meyer

"The Super Bowl Shuffle" is a charity single performed by the Chicago Bears football team (credited as the Chicago Bears Shufflin' Crew) in 1985. It was released in December 1985 on Chicago-based Red Label Records and distributed through Capitol Records seven weeks before their win in Super Bowl XX. The song peaked at number 41 on the US Billboard Hot 100, and made the Chicago Bears the only team in any professional sport to have a US Hot 100 hit and earn a Grammy Award nomination; the song was nominated for Best R&B Performance by a Duo or Group with Vocals at the 1987 awards ceremony. The song was certified gold by the RIAA on February 11, 1986, for sales of over 500,000 copies, while the accompanying music video, released on VHS and Betamax formats, was certified platinum for sales of over a million units.

== Song and video ==
"The Super Bowl Shuffle" instantly became a hit, selling a million copies and reaching number 41 on the Billboard Hot 100 and number 75 on the Cash Box Top 100 Billboard reported that the single's chart performance was propelled primarily by sales rather than radio airplay, saying, "Although the record has a great deal of pop airplay across the country, especially as a novelty for morning drive programs, only a handful of radio stations are reporting it on their playlists." "The Super Bowl Shuffle" fell in line with the Bears' high-media attention as they completed their one-loss regular season. The Bears dominated their postseason opponents, including the New England Patriots in Super Bowl XX, which they won 46–10.

The 1985 Chicago Bears were the second NFL team to have their own music video after the 1985 Seattle Seahawks, who released "The Blue Wave Is On a Roll" earlier in the season. The song was nominated for a Grammy Award in 1987 for Best R&B Performance by a Duo or Group, losing to "Kiss" by Prince. The 20th anniversary DVD was released in 2004, including the making of the video, outtakes and the music video itself. Julia Meyer has kept the copyright to the video.

Over $300,000 in profits from the song and music video were donated to the Chicago Community Trust to help Chicago families in need with clothing, shelter and food. This was consistent with Walter Payton's lyric in the song: "Now we're not doing this because we're greedy / The Bears are doing it to feed the needy". In 2014, six of the performers (Richard Dent, Jim McMahon, Otis Wilson, Willie Gault, Mike Richardson and Steve Fuller) sued Julia Meyer and Renaissance Marketing Corporation, who licenses the song, stating the proceeds from the song should benefit charities; the six players' attorney stated, "Among other things, the plaintiffs seek that a constructive trust be established for charitable purposes that they select in order to continue the Super Bowl Shuffle's charitable objective."

The video was taped at Park West, a Chicago night club, the morning after the Bears' only loss of the 1985 season, 38-24 to the Miami Dolphins on Monday Night Football on December 2. Jim McMahon and Walter Payton refused to participate in the video shoot, thinking it would be better to release the song and video after the season was complete. However, the team was insistent on releasing the song and video shortly after the shoot, so the video was filmed with the remaining players. Payton and McMahon both filmed their segments separately a week later at the Bears' practice facility after practice; their segments were interspersed in the video prior to release.

== Performers ==
=== Singers ===
Player	Position	No.
Walter Payton	Running back	34
Willie Gault	Wide receiver	83
Mike Singletary	Linebacker	50
Jim McMahon	Quarterback	9
Otis Wilson	Linebacker	55
Steve Fuller	Quarterback	4
Mike Richardson	Cornerback	27
Richard Dent	Defensive lineman	95
Gary Fencik	Safety	45
William Perry	Defensive lineman	72

=== "Shufflin' Crew" band ===
Player	Position	No.	Instrument
Maury Buford	Punter	8	Cowbell
Mike Tomczak	Quarterback	18	guitar
Dennis Gentry	Running back	29	Bass
Calvin Thomas	Running back	33	Saxophone
Reggie Phillips	Defensive back	48	Congas
Ken Taylor	Defensive back	31	Tambourine
Stefan Humphries	Offensive lineman	75	Drums
Tyrone Keys	Defensive lineman	98	Keyboard

=== "Shufflin' Crew" chorus ===
Player	Position	No.
Thomas Sanders	Running back	20
Leslie Frazier	Safety	21
Shaun Gayle	Cornerback	23
Jim Morrissey	Linebacker	51
Dan Rains	Linebacker	53
Keith Ortego	Wide receiver	89

The lyrics were written by Richard E. Meyer and Melvin Owens. The music was composed by Bobby Daniels and Lloyd Barry.

The "referee" in the video was portrayed by Julia Meyer (credited as Julia Kallish).

Bears defensive end Dan Hampton declined involvement with the Shuffle, thinking it may have been too arrogant.

Other personnel

- Executive producers: Richard E. Meyer, William D. Neal, James J. Hurley III, Barbara Supeter
- Director: Dave Thompson
- Associate producer: Richard A. Tufo
- Technical director: Darryl Crawl
- Editor: John Anderson
- Coordinating producer: Kim Alan Bigelow
- Technical coordinator: Dave Sorensen
- Lighting designer: Hugh Gallagher
- Assistant director: Johanna K. Hull
- Sound engineer: Fred Breitberg
- Cameras: Bill DeMarco, Eric Chellstorp, Dennis Jackson, Jon Vandruska
- Assistant cameras: Wendy Zauss, Tom Kruc
- Video: Mike Fayette, Steve Cardwell, Jim Keen, Jerry Wehland
- Location and editing facilities: Post Effects
- Park West Crew: Gregg Kincaid, Charles Mack, James Nudd, Dan Narducy, Michael Reed
- Make up: Venus Vargas

== Precedents ==
The 1985 Bears were not the first pro sports team with a group song.

- The Cincinnati Red Stockings, the first professional baseball team (1869–1870), sang a song to the spectators prior to some of their games: "We are a band of baseball players / From Cincinnati city..." However, no means to record it existed until 1877, after the team disbanded, and it thus was never recorded.
- Since the 1970s, some English soccer teams have celebrated qualifying for the FA Cup Final each year by recording a song for the occasion. The "cup final record", as it was known, became a tradition, with many of the songs being top ten successes in the UK music charts. The songs are occasionally original recordings but more often reworkings of recent chart successes with lyrics edited for the occasion. They often included the original artist singing along, especially when they are a fan of the team involved.
- The 1977 Denver Broncos running back Jon Keyworth sang "Make Those Miracles Happen" by L. Meeks and M. Weyand. However, the Broncos did not win the 1978 Super Bowl.
- In 1981, after the Los Angeles Dodgers won the World Series, four members of the team—Jerry Reuss, Jay Johnstone, Rick Monday, and Steve Yeager—recorded a cover of Queen's "We Are the Champions". They were backed by Leland Sklar on bass and Jeff Porcaro of Toto on drums. The short-lived group performed their song on the TV show Solid Gold.
- The 1984 San Francisco 49ers put out a record during that season, one in which they also went on to become Super Bowl champs. The song, "We Are the 49ers", was in the vein of post-disco/'80s dance-pop music. Later in the 1980s, the 49ers would put out another team song titled "49ers Rap". Neither of these songs, however, became a hit on the scale of the "Super Bowl Shuffle".

== Imitators and influence ==
The success of "The Super Bowl Shuffle" initiated numerous imitations from numerous NFL teams from across the league, making their own songs, but none achieving sales, a Billboard chart position, or Grammy Award nomination and recognition near what was accomplished by the Chicago Bears. Even a fan group from Chicago, called Da Superfans, performed a version of the song in early 2007 to celebrate the Bears' return to the Super Bowl that year.

=== NFL teams ===
==== Cincinnati Bengals ====
- In 1988, Cincinnati Bengals rookie Ickey Woods garnered some attention for his dance the "Ickey Shuffle"; that was the name of the dance, there was no actual song that was released. The Bengals also lost in Super Bowl XXIII.
- Cincinnati funk music pioneer Bootsy Collins teamed with the 2005 Cincinnati Bengals for a playoff song known as "Fear Da Tiger", but it had no actual single release and they, too, failed to qualify for the Super Bowl, with the rival Pittsburgh Steelers going on to win Super Bowl XL, defeating the Bengals in the playoffs along the way.

==== Green Bay Packers ====
- Spoofing the "Macarena" song, the Green Bay Packers created and released the song "Packarena" in 1996, during their Super Bowl XXXI run. The song received some local airplay, but never charted on the Billboard Hot 100. The song was later recreated in 2008, replacing the players with the 2007 team. It was played frequently during the team's back-to-back Super Bowl runs in 1996–1997 on local radio station WMYX-FM "99.1 The Mix".

==== Jacksonville Jaguars ====
- In November 1999, the Jacksonville Jaguars recorded "Uh Oh, The Jaguars Super Bowl Song", however it was never released as a single. The Jaguars lost 33–14 to the Tennessee Titans in the AFC Championship game.

==== Los Angeles Raiders ====
- During the 1986 season, two teams tried to repeat the pattern. The Los Angeles Raiders released "The Silver and Black Attack", based on "The Yellow and Black Attack" by Stryper, but the Raiders finished 8–8 that season and were out of the playoffs.

==== Los Angeles Rams ====
- The Los Angeles Rams recorded "Let's Ram It" during the 1986 season; however, they eventually lost the NFC Wild Card game to the Washington Redskins. Despite this, the song regained popularity on the internet prior to several high-profile playoff appearances following their return to Los Angeles in 2016. The Rams embraced the popularity of the song once again as they reintroduced it much to the humor of fans, including their appearances in both Super Bowl LIII and Super Bowl LVI, with them winning the latter.

==== Miami Dolphins ====
- In 1990, the Miami Dolphins created a song spoofing the MC Hammer song "U Can't Touch This" called "U Can't Touch Us". Miami would go 12–4 and be eliminated in the divisional playoffs by the AFC East rival Buffalo Bills.

==== Minnesota Vikings ====
- In early 2010, Prince created a song for the Minnesota Vikings called "Purple and Gold" as the fight song for the team after the team's playoff victory over the Dallas Cowboys. Minnesota would lose the following week to the eventual Super Bowl XLIV champion New Orleans Saints in the NFC Championship Game. The song was not initially commercially available, but nine years later, in April 2019, it was released as a 7" vinyl single and distributed to some attendees of a Minnesota Timberwolves NBA game. It was also made available digitally.

==== New England Patriots ====
- In early 1986, before the Super Bowl as a response to the Bears hit song "The Super Bowl Shuffle", the New England Patriots recorded their own team song, "New England, The Patriots, And We", whose lyrics recounted their success in the playoff brackets and predicted victory against the Bears in Super Bowl XX. Its music video featured appearances by several Patriots, Boston-area celebrities (including Robert Urich) and local media personalities. Unlike the Bears' song, the Patriots' song was not commercially available and thus never charted on the Billboard Hot 100. The song itself received some airplay on Boston radio stations. Despite the Patriots' optimistic prediction, the Bears went on to beat the Patriots in Super Bowl XX, 46–10.

==== New York Giants ====
- After winning Super Bowl XXI, the New York Giants released "Walk Like a Giant", based on "Walk Like an Egyptian" by the Bangles.

==== Philadelphia Eagles ====
- Also in 1988, the Philadelphia Eagles recorded the song "Buddy's Watching You", referring to Eagles head coach and former Bears defensive coordinator Buddy Ryan. The song was not commercially available as a single, but was released as a video on the VHS format. The Eagles Hall of Famer Reggie White, an ordained minister, made a reference in the song to his faith with the line "I hit quarterbacks like they committed sin." The Eagles would make the playoffs that year, but would ultimately lose in the Fog Bowl – ironically to the Chicago Bears.

==== Pittsburgh Steelers ====
- During the 1994 season, the Pittsburgh Steelers reportedly were planning to create a similar song, likely with help from backup quarterback Mike Tomczak, who was a member of the '85 Bears and participated in the successful "Super Bowl Shuffle." Reportedly, coach Bill Cowher vetoed the idea. The Steelers lost the 1994 AFC Championship game 17–13 to the San Diego Chargers. That same season, local Pittsburgh artist Roger Wood created the "Here We Go" song, which has since become the Steelers unofficial fight song and is updated almost annually to account for roster turnover.

==== San Francisco 49ers ====
- The 49ers had been the first team during the 1980s to attempt a group song, predating that of the Bears. In 1984, safety Ronnie Lott and running back Roger Craig convinced numerous members of the team to write and record their own rap song, simply entitled "We're the 49ers". It was produced by Narada Michael Walden, who became known for his work with Whitney Houston and Aretha Franklin. The song was commercially available, but did not chart on the Billboard Hot 100.

==== Seattle Seahawks ====
- During the 1985 season, the Seattle Seahawks recorded "The Blue Wave Is on a Roll", a jazz-themed song with various vocal harmonies, a saxophone solo, as well as various blooper-style sound effects. The song was not commercially available but instead was an internal production and video that circulated among fans. The Seahawks would ultimately have an 8–8 win-lose record and miss the playoffs.

==== NFL Pro Bowl ====
- In early 2011, some of the cast of Late Night with Jimmy Fallon, along with Will Arnett and Horatio Sanz, dressed as players in the Pro Bowl, made a parody video called "The Pro Bowl Shuffle" about the Pro Bowl.

=== Other parodies ===
- In 1985, the Kansas Wesleyan football team won a conference title in the NAIA. They made the "KCAC shuffle" and showed it on the local access channel for Salina, Kansas, Channel 6.
- During the 1985–86 season, the Boston College men's ice hockey team recorded the "Beanpot Trot" prior to their participation in the famed Beanpot Tournament. The Eagles placed second, losing 4–1 to rival school Boston University in the championship game on February 10, 1986.
- The Houston Rockets, with the aid of Dynomite III, had a rap song in 1986 titled "Rocket Strut". They made it all the way to the NBA Finals that year, but lost to Boston in 6 games.
- Also in 1986, the New York Mets released their own rap song called “Get Metsmerized”. The Mets won 108 games that season, advanced to the World Series, and defeated the Boston Red Sox in seven games to win their second world championship.
- In 1987, "Super Bowl Shuffle" producer Richard E. Meyer created a similar music video starring Chicago Bears coach Mike Ditka, titled "The Grabowski Shuffle." The video, about "working hard to get what you want", was inspired by a comment Ditka had made about his team's reputation: "There are Smiths and there are Grabowskis; we're the Grabowskis."
- Also that year, the MLB World Champion Minnesota Twins released a music video called "The Berenguer Boogie", honoring their relief pitcher Juan Berenguer (whom they nicknamed "El Gasolino") and his victory celebration after striking out opposing batters. The video enjoyed a resurgence of popularity in the 21st century via the internet.
- Soon after the 1986–87 NHL season, the Calgary Flames recorded a music video for the original song "Red Hot" for charity, which featured Flames players pretending to play instruments and lip-syncing to the song.
- Prior to the 1988 NCAA Division I-A football season, the preseason No. 1 Florida State Seminoles, starring future Pro Football Hall of Fame cornerback Deion Sanders, made a video known as the "Seminole Rap," promising the school's first national championship would result from the season. They lost their first game to the rival Miami Hurricanes (the defending National Champions) 31–0. The Noles would finish the season 11–1 and ranked No. 3 in the nation, behind No. 1 Notre Dame and No. 2 Miami.
- Verne Gagne and personalities from his American Wrestling Association promoted a major event with a song known as "The WrestleRock Rumble."
- Gorgeous Ladies of Wrestling had a "Super Bowl Shuffle"-like song as part of its weekly program. Each wrestler's recorded part preceded the match that she was involved in. Even the referees were part of the tune.
- On the 17th Episode of the 30th season of "Saturday Night Live" hosted by Tom Brady, the show parodied the Super Bowl Shuffle and another show called "Behind the Music" with a short sketch. It told a fictional story of what happened to the Bears Shufflin' Crew as a band after their song, including a sequel song and a solo run by Bears quarterback Jim McMahon.
- On the 3rd Season premiere of the FX television show The League, one of the main characters did a parody of this with Maurice Jones-Drew, Brent Grimes and Sidney Rice entitled "The Shiva Bowl Shuffle" as a reference to their fantasy league's Super Bowl.
- Key & Peele did a sketch called the "East/West Bowl Rap".
- Saturday Night Live did a sketch called the "Establishment Shuffle", using the Shuffle style to parody the GOP and the 2015–16 Republican presidential primary season.
- Scott Gairdner created a viral spoof entitled the "Sex Offender Shuffle", which parodies "The Super Bowl Shuffle" music video with actors portraying sex offenders who rap about the crimes they committed and how they have changed their ways in a "Super Bowl Shuffle"-styled song. To date, the video has received over 56 million views.

== 2010 reprise ==
Seven of the surviving 1985 Bears (Walter Payton had died in 1999 of liver cancer) were reunited to film an updated version as a 30-second commercial promoting Boost Mobile, which was aired during Super Bowl XLIV. The seven players featured were quarterback Jim McMahon, backup quarterback Steve Fuller, receiver Willie Gault, linebackers Mike Singletary and Otis Wilson, defensive lineman Richard Dent, and punter Maury Buford. All of the featured players wore #50 jerseys as part of the company's $50 deal.

== 2014 celebrity cover version ==
On January 21, 2014, Misfire Records released a cover version of the song featuring acclaimed musicians (Jim James of My Morning Jacket, John Roderick of The Long Winters, and Tim Harrington of Les Savy Fav), comedians (Tom Scharpling of The Best Show on WFMU, Scott Aukerman of Comedy Bang! Bang!, David Wain of The State and Stella, Kyle Kinane, and Dave Hill), and other notables (wrestler Colt Cabana and internet cat celebrity Lil Bub). Organized by radio host Sean Cannon with production from musician Alexander Smith, all proceeds from sales were to be donated to Reading Is Fundamental.

== Certifications ==
Region	Certification	Certified units/sales
United States (RIAA)	Gold	1,000,000^{^}
^{^} Shipments figures based on certification alone.

== See also ==
- 1985 Chicago Bears season
