= Keith Ortego =

American football player (1963–2022)

No. 89
- Position: Wide receiver

Personal information
- Born: August 30, 1963; Eunice, Louisiana, U.S.
- Died: March 2, 2022 (aged 58); Eunice, Louisiana, U.S.
- Listed height: 6 ft 0 in (1.83 m)
- Listed weight: 180 lb (82 kg)

Career information
- High school: Eunice (LA)
- College: McNeese State
- NFL draft: 1985: undrafted

Career history
- Chicago Bears (1985–1987)

Awards and highlights
- Super Bowl champion (XX)

Career NFL statistics
- Receptions: 23
- Receiving yards: 430
- Receiving touchdowns: 2
- Stats at Pro Football Reference

Bryant Keith Ortego (August 30, 1963 – March 2, 2022) was an American professional football wide receiver for the Chicago Bears of the NFL. He was a member of the Bears team that won Super Bowl XX following the 1985 NFL season. He was also a member of the "Shuffling Crew" in the video The Super Bowl Shuffle.

Ortego attended McNeese State University, where he was an All-Southland Conference and All-Louisiana receiver who led his team in receptions with 21 (for 340 yards) in 1983 and 32 (for 602 yards) in 1984. He left as the school's second all-time leading receiver with 1,202 yards and was inducted into the McNeese State Hall of Fame in 2016.

Following his college career, Ortego signed with the Bears as an undrafted free agent for the 1985 season. After missing the first 9 games of the season with a knee injury, Ortego became the Bears starting punt returner for the rest of the season, returning 17 punts for 158 yards. He added 11 more punt returns for 63 yards in the playoffs, including two for 20 in their Super Bowl win. In the following season, Ortego caught 23 passes for 430 yards. He played one more year after that, appearing in 8 games, but with no receptions.

Ortego died on March 2, 2022, at the age of 58.
