= Maury Buford =

American football player (born 1960)

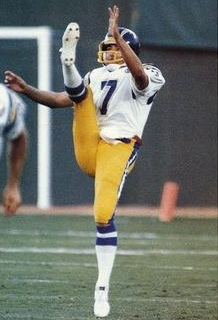
- Buford in 1984

No. 7, 8
- Position: Punter

Personal information
- Born: February 18, 1960 (age 66); Mount Pleasant, Texas, U.S.
- Listed height: 6 ft 1 in (1.85 m)
- Listed weight: 191 lb (87 kg)

Career information
- High school: Mount Pleasant
- College: Texas Tech
- NFL draft: 1982: 8th round, 215th overall pick

Career history
- San Diego Chargers (1982–1984); Chicago Bears (1985–1986); Denver Broncos (1988)*; Atlanta Falcons (1988)*; New York Giants (1988); Green Bay Packers (1989)*; Chicago Bears (1989–1991)
- * Offseason or practice squad member only

Awards and highlights
- Super Bowl champion (XX)

Career NFL statistics
- Punts: 577
- Punt yards: 23,867
- Longest punt: 71
- Stats at Pro Football Reference

Maury Anthony Buford (born February 18, 1960) is an American former professional football player who was a punter in the National Football League (NFL) for the San Diego Chargers, the Chicago Bears and the New York Giants. He played college football for the Texas Tech Red Raiders and was selected 215th overall by the Chargers in the eighth round of the 1982 NFL draft. He won a Super Bowl ring as a member of the 1985 Chicago Bears in Super Bowl XX. He was also a member of the "Shuffling Crew Band" in the video The Super Bowl Shuffle, "playing" cowbell.

During Super Bowl XLIV, Buford joined other members of the 1985 Chicago Bears in resurrecting the Super Bowl Shuffle in a Boost Mobile commercial.

He now lives in the Dallas/Ft. Worth area and is the owner of Buford Roofing, Inc. He is a licensed insurance adjuster in the State of Texas where he provides residential and commercial roofing services.

== NFL career statistics ==
Legend
	Won the Super Bowl
	Led the league
**Bold**	Career high

=== Regular season ===
Year	Team	Punting									
Year	Team	GP	Punts	Yds	Net Yds	Lng	Avg	Net Avg	Blk	Ins20	TB
1982	SDG	9	21	868	722	**71**	41.3	31.4	**2**	5	3
1983	SDG	**16**	63	2,763	2,304	60	**43.9**	36.6	0	13	8
1984	SDG	**16**	66	2,773	2,314	60	42.0	35.1	0	11	3
1985	CHI	**16**	68	2,870	2,387	69	42.2	34.6	1	18	**14**
1986	CHI	**16**	69	2,850	2,580	59	41.3	**36.9**	1	20	8
1988	NYG	15	73	3,012	2,516	66	41.3	33.5	**2**	13	10
1989	CHI	**16**	72	2,844	2,402	60	39.5	33.4	0	21	9
1990	CHI	**16**	**76**	**3,073**	**2,611**	59	40.4	33.5	**2**	**22**	7
1991	CHI	**16**	69	2,814	2,449	64	40.8	35.0	1	13	8
Career		136	577	23,867	20,285	71	41.4	34.6	9	136	70

=== Playoffs ===
Year	Team	Punting									
Year	Team	GP	Punts	Yds	Net Yds	Lng	Avg	Net Avg	Blk	Ins20	TB
1982	SDG	2	5	213	177	50	**42.6**	35.4	0	2	1
1985	CHI	**3**	**20**	**760**	**673**	**55**	38.0	33.7	0	**4**	**2**
1986	CHI	1	5	203	181	49	40.6	**36.2**	0	0	0
1990	CHI	2	4	139	124	50	34.8	31.0	0	1	0
1991	CHI	1	0	0	0	0	0.0	0.0	**1**	0	1
Career		9	34	1,315	1,155	55	38.7	33.0	1	7	4
