= Richard E. Meyer =

American businessman, entrepreneur and record producer (1939-1992)

Richard E. Meyer (May 8, 1939 – August 18, 1992) was an American businessman, entrepreneur and record producer.

== Biography ==
Meyer was born in Reading, Ohio, a suburb of Cincinnati. He applied to the U.S. Naval Academy, but was rejected because of his height (6 feet 7 inches). After graduating from the University of Michigan with a degree in journalism, he borrowed money to start an advertising agency named Meyer and Rosenthal. Within two years of opening, the company went from no revenue to $2 million. In 1974, Meyer joined the perfume company Jovan, Inc. and became its president and CEO in 1977. Under Meyer's leadership, sales of Jovan perfumes quadrupled.

In 1984, Meyer founded the Chicago-based record label Red Label Records. In 1985, he wrote the lyrics for and produced the Chicago Bears' novelty record, "The Super Bowl Shuffle".

In 1988, Meyer sued Ad Age magazine and its editor-at-large Joseph M. Winski for libel after the magazine published an article alleging that Meyer was a heavy drinker and cocaine user. Meyer initially lost the suit, but the decision was reversed on appeal, leading to an undisclosed settlement between the parties.

=== Personal life and death ===
Meyer died of cancer in 1992, at the age of 53. He was survived by his wife Julia and two daughters.
