= Ken Taylor (American football) =

American football player (born 1963)

No. 31, 24
- Position: Cornerback

Personal information
- Born: September 2, 1963 (age 63); San Jose, California, U.S.
- Listed height: 6 ft 1 in (1.85 m)
- Listed weight: 185 lb (84 kg)

Career information
- High school: Yerba Buena (San Jose)
- College: Oregon State
- NFL draft: 1985: undrafted

Career history
- Chicago Bears (1985); San Diego Chargers (1986)

Awards and highlights
- Super Bowl champion (XX); 2× Second-team All-Pac-10 (1983, 1984)

Career NFL statistics
- Interceptions: 4
- Fumble recoveries: 2
- Return yards: 216
- Stats at Pro Football Reference

Kenneth Daniel Taylor (born September 2, 1963) is an American former professional football player who was a defensive back who played cornerback for two seasons for the Chicago Bears and the San Diego Chargers of the National Football League (NFL). He played college football for the Oregon State Beavers. He was a member of the 1985 Bears team that won Super Bowl XX.

== Professional career ==
As a member of the 1985 Chicago Bears defense, he intercepted three passes during the 1985 regular season. His first NFL interception came in Week 4 against Washington and he picked off another pass in Week 8 at Soldier Field against the Minnesota Vikings.

Taylor made one start for the 1985 Bears defense, filling in for an injured Mike Richardson in Week 9 against the Green Bay Packers. He made 2 tackles in the game, his only start for Chicago.
