= Reggie Phillips =

American football player (born 1960)

No. 48
- Position: Cornerback

Personal information
- Born: December 12, 1960 (age 65); Houston, Texas, U.S.
- Listed height: 5 ft 10 in (1.78 m)
- Listed weight: 170 lb (77 kg)

Career information
- High school: Yates (Houston)
- College: SMU
- NFL draft: 1985: 2nd round, 49th overall pick

Career history
- Chicago Bears (1985–1987); Phoenix Cardinals (1988); Detroit Lions (1989)*
- * Offseason or practice squad member only

Awards and highlights
- Super Bowl champion (XX)

Career NFL statistics
- Interceptions: 3
- Fumble recoveries: 1
- Stats at Pro Football Reference

Reginald Keith Phillips (born December 12, 1960) is an American former professional football player who was a cornerback in the National Football League (NFL). He played for the Chicago Bears from 1985 to 1987 and the Phoenix Cardinals in 1988. He was selected by the Bears in the second round of the 1985 NFL draft with the 49th overall pick. Phillips played college football for the SMU Mustangs and attended Jack Yates Senior High School in Houston.

Phillips was a member of the 1985 Bears that won Super Bowl XX; he is best remembered for returning an interception for a touchdown in that game. He was also a member of the "Shuffling Crew" in the video The Super Bowl Shuffle.
