= Tyrone Keys =

American gridiron football player (born 1960)

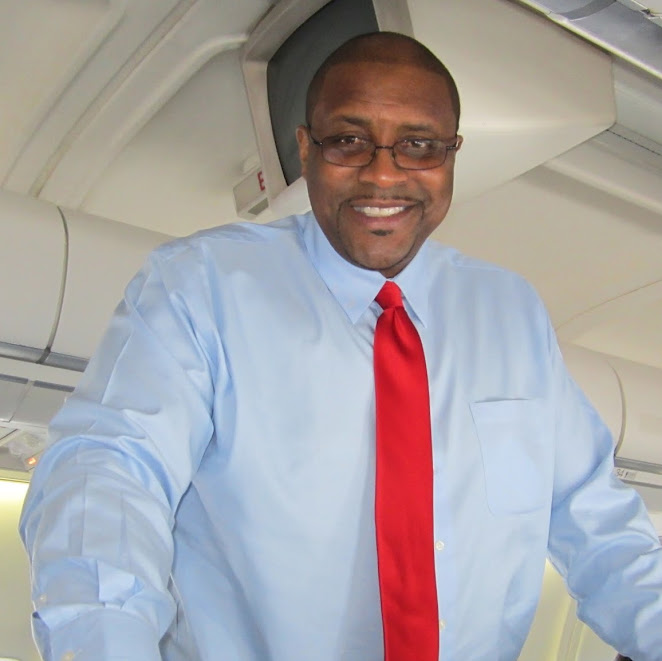
- Keys in 2011

No. 79, 98, 93
- Position: Defensive end

Personal information
- Born: October 24, 1960 (age 66); Jackson, Mississippi, U.S.
- Listed height: 6 ft 7 in (2.01 m)
- Listed weight: 272 lb (123 kg)

Career information
- High school: Callaway (Jackson, Mississippi)
- College: Mississippi State
- NFL draft: 1981: 5th round, 113th overall pick

Career history
- New York Jets (1981)*; BC Lions (1981–1982); Chicago Bears (1983–1985); Tampa Bay Buccaneers (1986–1987); San Diego Chargers (1988)
- * Offseason or practice squad member only

Awards and highlights
- Super Bowl champion (XX); 3× Second-team All-SEC (1978, 1979, 1980)

Career NFL statistics
- Sacks: 9
- Fumble recoveries: 1
- Stats at Pro Football Reference

Tyrone Keys (born October 24, 1960) is an American former professional football player who played defensive end for six seasons for the Chicago Bears, Tampa Bay Buccaneers, and San Diego Chargers. He was a member of the Bears team that won Super Bowl XX following the 1985 NFL season. He was also a member of the "Shuffling Crew" in the video The Super Bowl Shuffle. In high school Keys was a member of the Callaway High School Chargers of Jackson, Mississippi which won all 12 of their 1975 season games and won the Big 8 Conference championship (the Big 8 was at the time the conference of Mississippi's largest high schools). In college at Mississippi State University Keys played four years at defensive tackle. In 1980 Keys made a last minute tackle of Alabama quarterback Don Jacobs, causing a fumble which sealed the Bulldogs' 6–3 upset of the #1 Crimson Tide.
