= Leslie Frazier =

American football player and coach (born 1959)

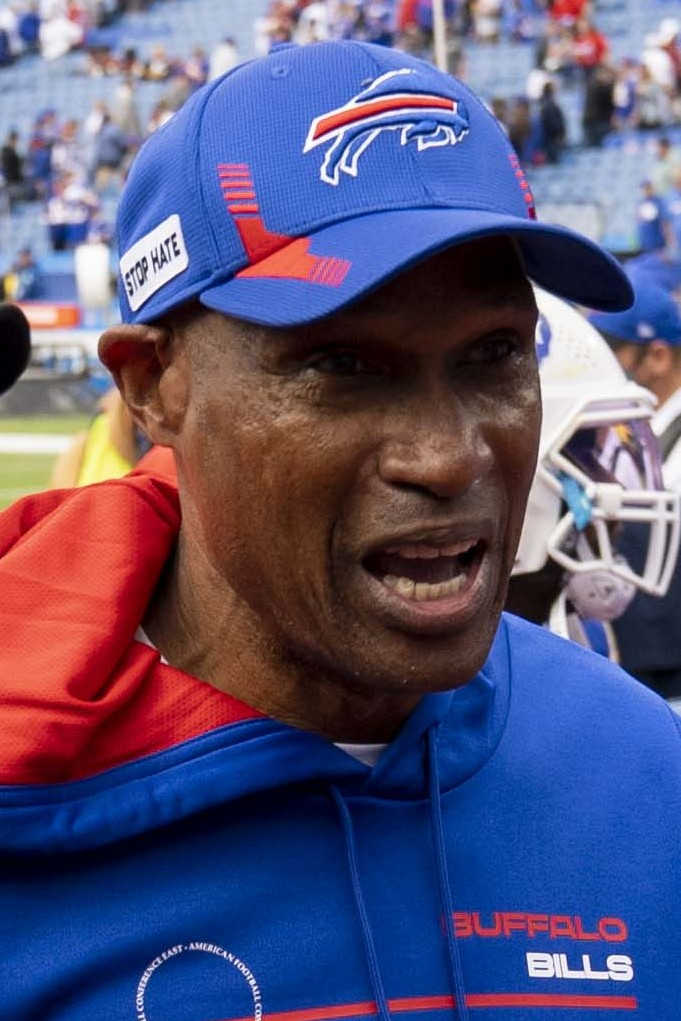
- Frazier in 2021

Seattle Seahawks
- Title: Assistant head coach

Personal information
- Born: April 3, 1959 (age 67); Columbus, Mississippi, U.S.
- Listed height: 6 ft 0 in (1.83 m)
- Listed weight: 189 lb (86 kg)

Career information
- Position: Defensive back (No. 21)
- High school: Lee (Columbus)
- College: Alcorn State (1978-1980)
- NFL draft: 1981: undrafted

Career history

Playing
- Chicago Bears (1981–1985)

Coaching
- Trinity International (1988–1996) Head coach; Illinois (1997–1998) Defensive backs coach; Philadelphia Eagles (1999–2002) Defensive backs coach; Cincinnati Bengals (2003–2004) Defensive coordinator; Indianapolis Colts (2005–2006); Defensive assistant (2005); Assistant head coach & defensive backs coach (2006); Minnesota Vikings (2007–2013); Defensive coordinator (2007); Assistant head coach & defensive coordinator (2008–2010); Interim head coach (2010); Head coach (2011–2013); Tampa Bay Buccaneers (2014–2015) Defensive coordinator; Baltimore Ravens (2016) Secondary coach; Buffalo Bills (2017–2022); Defensive coordinator (2017–2019); Assistant head coach & defensive coordinator (2020–2022); Seattle Seahawks (2024–present) Assistant head coach

Awards and highlights
- Playing: Super Bowl champion (XX); Coaching: 2× Super Bowl champion (XLI, LX)

Career NFL statistics
- Games played: 65
- Interceptions: 20
- Sacks: 1
- Fumble recoveries: 2
- Return yards: 77
- Defensive touchdowns: 2
- Stats at Pro Football Reference

Head coaching record
- Regular season: 21–32–1 (.398)
- Postseason: 0–1 (.000)
- Career: 21–33–1 (.391)
- Coaching profile at Pro Football Reference

Leslie Antonio Frazier (born April 3, 1959) is an American professional football coach and former player who is currently the assistant head coach of the Seattle Seahawks. He played professional football as a cornerback for the Chicago Bears in the National Football League (NFL), winning a Super Bowl in the 1985 season.

Frazier served as the head coach of the Minnesota Vikings from 2010 to 2013 and previously served as an assistant coach for the Baltimore Ravens, Tampa Bay Buccaneers, Indianapolis Colts, Cincinnati Bengals, and Philadelphia Eagles. He was most recently an assistant head coach and defensive coordinator for the Buffalo Bills.

== College career ==
Frazier started his sports career at Stephen D. Lee High School in Columbus, Mississippi where he won 9 high school letters playing three different sports: Baseball, Football, and Basketball.

Frazier played college football at Alcorn State University from 1978 to 1980, where he lined up in the defensive secondary next to Roynell Young. In his freshman season, Frazier recorded six interceptions and 62 tackles. His sophomore season was even better, as he set a school record with 9 interceptions, while also breaking up 26 passes, recovering 2 fumbles, and making 44 tackles, while his team finished with an 8–2 record. Frazier's junior season was cut short by a torn hamstring injury, but he still put up 5 interceptions and 49 tackles. At the end of the year, Frazier decided to skip his senior season and declare for the NFL draft.

== Professional career ==
Frazier went undrafted in 1981, but was signed by the Bears just days later. He spent most of his rookie season on special teams, returning six kickoffs for 78 yards. In the 9-game strike shortened season of 1982, Frazier made the starting lineup, intercepting 2 passes and recovering 1 fumble in six starts. Over the next three seasons, he intercepted 18 more passes.

Frazier was a part of the 1985 Chicago Bears team that won Super Bowl XX. During the 1985 championship season, Frazier led the team with six interceptions. His playing career was cut short due to a knee injury he suffered returning a punt in the second quarter of the Super Bowl. He would be carried off the field. Surgery was conducted by Dr. Bill Clancy of the University of Wisconsin at Madison whereupon it was revealed that the damage to the knee included tears of the anterior cruciate, posterior cruciate, and medial collateral ligaments and a fractured bone under the kneecap. It was initially anticipated that he would be able to return during the latter half of the 1986 NFL season. However, by October it was clear he was not going to be able to play for the rest of 1986. His knee never completely healed to the point of making a comeback and he was cut by the Bears on August 3, 1987. He was also a member of the "G Crew" in "The Super Bowl Shuffle".

== Coaching career ==
Frazier started his coaching career in 1988 as the first head coach at Trinity College in Illinois, now known as Trinity International University. He held the position for nine seasons, built the NAIA program from the ground up and won a pair of Northern Illinois Intercollegiate Conference titles before he moved on to the University of Illinois in 1997 as the Illinois defensive backs coach.

=== Philadelphia Eagles ===
In 1999, Frazier joined first time head coach Andy Reid as defensive backs coach for the Philadelphia Eagles. It was there that Frazier worked as a fellow assistant with the Vikings future head coach, Brad Childress. The Eagles defense improved steadily in the four years that Frazier was there.

=== Cincinnati Bengals ===
In 2003, Frazier was hired as defensive coordinator of the Cincinnati Bengals under new head coach Marvin Lewis where he helped turn the unit into a group that increased takeaways from 24 in 2003 to 36 in 2004. The Bengals' 36 takeaways ranked third in the NFL in 2004. The 2004 Bengals notched 20 interceptions, the most since 1996. The Bengals' defense improved from 28th in the league in total yards allowed in 2003 to 19th in 2004, and declined in the two years following his dismissal.

=== Indianapolis Colts ===
In 2005, Frazier was hired by Tony Dungy as a defensive assistant for the Indianapolis Colts, receiving the title of special assistant to the head coach as well as defensive backs coach. He was specifically brought in by Dungy to help the Colts' young corps of defensive backs. During his time in Indianapolis the Colts passing defense improved from 15th in 2005 to second in 2006. On February 4, 2007, the Colts beat Frazier's former team, the Chicago Bears, in Super Bowl XLI.

=== Minnesota Vikings ===
On February 8, 2007, Frazier became the defensive coordinator for the Minnesota Vikings under head coach Brad Childress following the hiring of Vikings defensive coordinator Mike Tomlin by the Pittsburgh Steelers as their head coach. On November 22, 2010, the Vikings fired head coach Brad Childress after the team started 3–7 and named Frazier the interim head coach for the remainder of the 2010 season. Frazier ended the 2010 season with a loss to the Detroit Lions, putting the Vikings in last place in the NFC North. Frazier's record in 2010 was 3–3. On January 3, 2011, the Vikings and Frazier reached an agreement making him the permanent head coach. In his first season as head coach, the rebuilding Vikings went 3–13, their worst season since 1984. On December 5, 2011, Vikings owner Zygi Wilf stated Frazier would return in 2012. In Frazier's second full year as head coach, the Vikings improved to 10–6, making the playoffs. The biggest single-season turn around in Vikings history resulted in Frazier finishing fourth in voting for the NFL Coach of the Year Award and the Vikings exercising their fourth year team option to keep Frazier under contract through 2014. On December 30, 2013, Frazier was fired as the Vikings head coach after a 5–10–1 season.

=== Tampa Bay Buccaneers ===
Frazier was hired by the Tampa Bay Buccaneers to be their defensive coordinator on January 3, 2014. On January 7, 2016, the Tampa Bay Buccaneers announced that they would not pick up Frazier's 2016 option.

=== Baltimore Ravens ===
On January 15, 2016, Frazier was hired by the Baltimore Ravens as their secondary coach.

=== Buffalo Bills ===
On January 12, 2017, Frazier was hired by the Buffalo Bills to be their defensive coordinator, reuniting him with new Bills head coach Sean McDermott, whom Frazier worked alongside as assistant coaches for the Philadelphia Eagles from 1999 to 2002. In Frazier's first year with the Bills, the team made the playoffs for the first time since 1999 and ended what was previously the longest playoff drought in the 4 major North American professional sports leagues. On March 4, 2020, Frazier was promoted to assistant head coach. In Frazier's first year as assistant head coach, the Bills won both their first AFC East title and playoff game since 1995 and made their first AFC Championship Game since 1993, in which they lost to the Kansas City Chiefs 38–24.

On February 28, 2023, the Bills announced that Frazier would not be returning to the defensive coordinator position in 2023 and that he intended to return to coaching in 2024, not necessarily with the Bills.

=== Seattle Seahawks ===
On February 2, 2024, Frazier was hired as the assistant head coach for the Seattle Seahawks under new head coach Mike Macdonald. He was part of the coaching staff in the 29–13 Super Bowl LX victory over the New England Patriots.

=== Potential return to head coaching ===
Since 2018, several teams around the NFL have considered hiring Frazier as their next head coach. In 2018, he was interviewed by his former team, the Indianapolis Colts for their vacant head coaching spot, before the team hired Philadelphia Eagles offensive coordinator Frank Reich on February 11, 2018. In 2021, Frazier was nearly hired by the Houston Texans as their next head coach, a spot that eventually went to Baltimore Ravens assistant head coach David Culley on January 27, 2021. In 2022, Frazier was interviewed for multiple head coaching vacancies for teams such as the New York Giants, Miami Dolphins, and the Chicago Bears, whom he previously played for from 1981 to 1985 and won Super Bowl XX with the team. Frazier was nearly hired by the Giants in 2022 before the job was eventually won by former Buffalo Bills offensive coordinator Brian Daboll on January 28, 2022. Frazier has not held a head coaching position since 2013, which was his fourth and final year as the coach of the Minnesota Vikings.

== Head coaching record ==
Team	Year	Regular season					Postseason			
Team	Year	Won	Lost	Ties	Win %	Finish	Won	Lost	Win %	Result
MIN*	2010	3	3	0	.500	4th in NFC North	—	—	—	—
MIN	2011	3	13	0	.188	4th in NFC North	—	—	—	—
MIN	2012	10	6	0	.625	2nd in NFC North	0	1	.000	Lost to Green Bay Packers in NFC Wild Card Game
MIN	2013	5	10	1	.344	4th in NFC North	—	—	—	—
Total		21	32	1	.398		0	1	.000	

* – Interim head coach

== Personal life ==
Frazier is a Christian. He and his wife, Gale, have three children.
