= Henry Waechter =

American football player (born 1959)

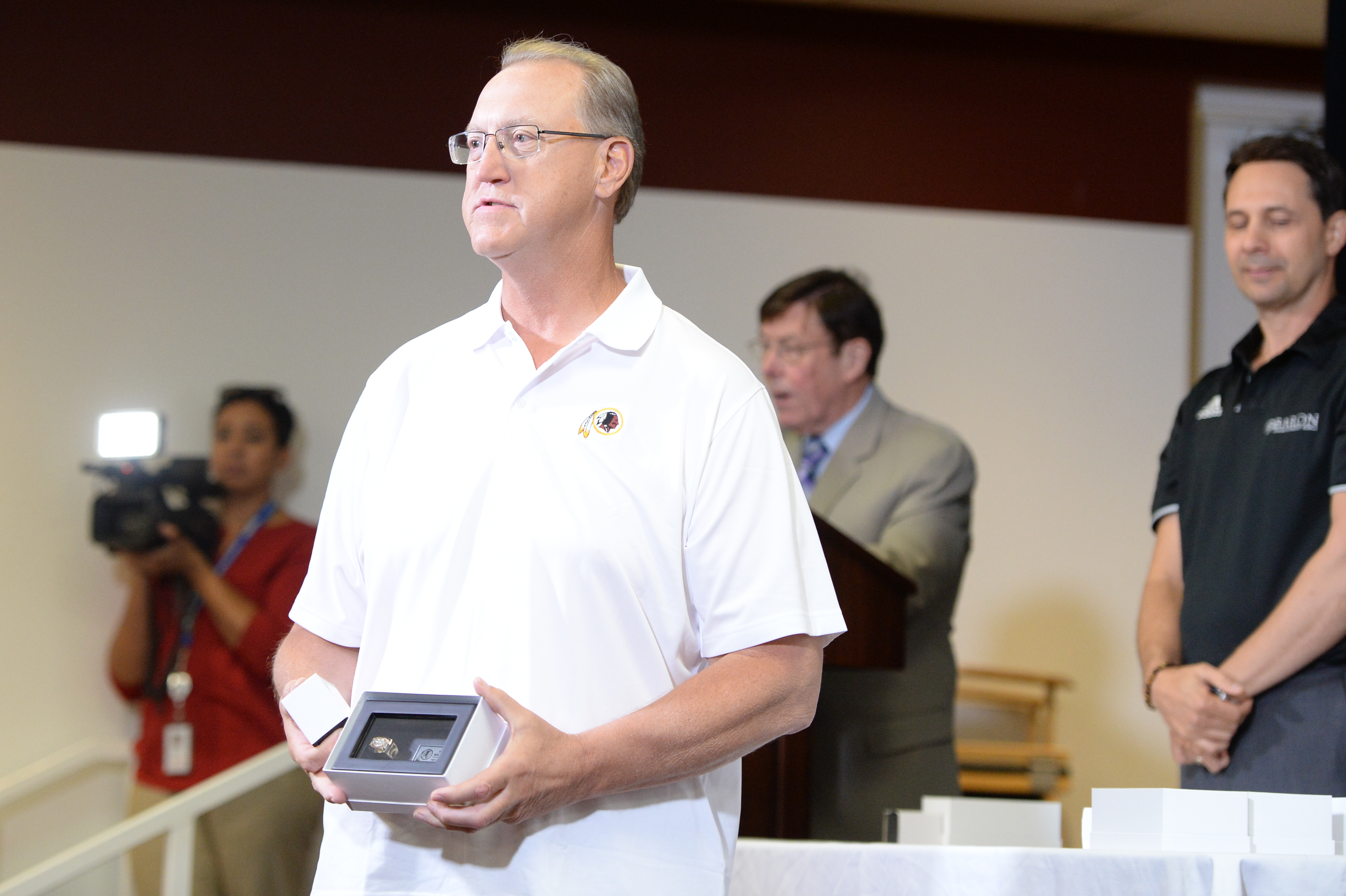
- Waechter after receiving his Super Bowl ring at a ceremony held in 2018

No. 75, 71, 70, 67
- Positions: Defensive end, defensive tackle

Personal information
- Born: February 13, 1959 (age 67); Epworth, Iowa, U.S.
- Listed height: 6 ft 5 in (1.96 m)
- Listed weight: 270 lb (122 kg)

Career information
- High school: Western Dubuque (Epworth)
- College: Nebraska
- NFL draft: 1982: 7th round, 173rd overall pick

Career history
- Chicago Bears (1982); Baltimore / Indianapolis Colts (1983–1984); Chicago Bears (1984–1986); Washington Redskins (1987)

Awards and highlights
- 2× Super Bowl champion (XX, XXII); Second-team All-Big Eight (1981)

Career NFL statistics
- Sacks: 7
- Safeties: 1
- Stats at Pro Football Reference

Henry Carl Waechter (born February 13, 1959) is an American former professional football player who was a defensive end and defensive tackle for six seasons in the National Football League (NFL). He played college football for the Nebraska Cornhuskers and was selected in the seventh round of the 1982 NFL draft.

He is a two-time Super Bowl champion, having won Super Bowl XX as a member of the Chicago Bears, and was retroactively awarded a ring by the Washington Redskins, who went on to win Super Bowl XXII.

== Biography ==
Waechter was born in Epworth, Iowa. He played college football for Waldorf College, where he was an All-American, before transferring to the University of Nebraska–Lincoln, with his younger brother Kevin serving as his teammate at the latter. He was selected in the seventh round of the 1982 NFL draft.

Waechter played for the Chicago Bears in 1982, and from 1984 to 1986. He played for the Baltimore / Indianapolis Colts in 1983 and 1984, and the Washington Redskins in 1987.

Waechter is a member of the 1985 Bears that won Super Bowl XX. He scored the game's final points on a sack of New England Patriots quarterback Steve Grogan in the end zone for a safety. In 2018, Waechter was awarded a Super Bowl ring for playing one game for the Redskins in 1987, the year they won Super Bowl XXII.
