= Gary Fencik =

American football player (born 1954)

No. 45
- Position: Safety

Personal information
- Born: June 11, 1954 (age 72); Chicago, Illinois, U.S.
- Listed height: 6 ft 1 in (1.85 m)
- Listed weight: 194 lb (88 kg)

Career information
- High school: Barrington (Barrington, Illinois)
- College: Yale (1972–1975)
- NFL draft: 1976: 10th round, 281st overall pick

Career history
- Miami Dolphins (1976)*; Chicago Bears (1976–1987)
- * Offseason or practice squad member only

Awards and highlights
- Super Bowl champion (XX); First-team All-Pro (1981); Second-team All-Pro (1985); 2× Pro Bowl (1980, 1981); PFR 1980's All-Decade Team (2nd.); 100 greatest Bears of all-time; First-team All-East (1975)

Career NFL statistics
- Tackles: 1,102
- Interceptions: 38
- Interception yards: 488
- Fumble recoveries: 13
- Sacks: 2
- Defensive touchdowns: 1
- Stats at Pro Football Reference

John Gary Fencik (/ˈfɛnsɪk/ FEN-sik; born June 11, 1954) is an American former professional football safety who played in the National Football League (NFL) for 12 seasons with the Chicago Bears. He played college football for the Yale Bulldogs, earning first-team All-East honors in 1975. Fencik was selected by the Miami Dolphins in the 10th round of the 1976 NFL draft, but was released from the team before the start of the season and joined the Bears.

With the Bears, Fenick received two Pro Bowl selections and one first-team All-Pro selection. He was also a member of the 1985 Bears team that won the franchise's first Super Bowl title in the Super Bowl XX. Fencik is the Bears franchise leader in interceptions and also set the franchise record for tackles at the time of his retirement. He was named among the 100 greatest Bears of all-time in 2019.

== Playing career ==
He played college football at Yale University, where he received his bachelor's degree in 1976. In 1986, he received an MBA from Northwestern University. John Madden once said in a broadcast that "Gary Fencik played football at Yale; that is like saying clean dirt". At Yale, Fencik played wide receiver, catching 86 passes for 1,435 yards and 7 touchdowns from 1973 to 1975. In his senior season, Fencik caught 42 passes and led the Ivy League with 729 receiving yards.

Considered too slow to be an NFL receiver, the Miami Dolphins drafted Fencik in the tenth round of the 1976 NFL draft with the 281st overall selection, intending to convert him to defensive back. After rupturing his left lung in a preseason game against the New Orleans Saints, he was released in September and headed home to Chicago, planning to start a banking career until he received a job offer from the Chicago Bears.

In Chicago, he was the team's defensive captain through the 1980s including the 1985 Super Bowl championship season. He made two Pro Bowl appearances (1980, 1981). He was also awarded a gold record and a platinum video award for the 1985 Super Bowl Shuffle. Fencik and Doug Plank were dubbed "The Hit Men", a fact referenced by Fencik in The Super Bowl Shuffle.

In September 1986 he was featured on the cover of GQ magazine. His picture also appeared on the reverse side of a Playboy centerfold, showing him and the December 1982 Playmate Charlotte Kemp, shopping at the Old Town Art Fair. The story promoted Fencik as "the NFL's smartest player."

Fencik finished his career with 38 interceptions, which he returned for 488 yards and a touchdown. He also recorded 4 sacks and recovered 13 fumbles, returning them for 65 yards.

During his playing career, he became the part-owner of the Hunt Club, a popular bar on Chicago's North Side.

== Retirement ==
Following his football career, Fencik has worked in the finance industry. Fencik worked with Wells Fargo and UBS before joining Adams Street Partners in 1995. He has also worked as a sports commentator, mainly on WGN radio where he was a color commentator on Bears radio broadcasts from 1990 to 1993. During the 1988 NFL season he paired with James Brown as an NFL television commentator on CBS.

During Fencik's final NFL season, he was widely speculated as a potential candidate in the then-upcoming 1987 Chicago mayoral election. Donald L. Totten (the chairman of the Cook County Republican Party) attempted to persuade Fencik to run as a Republican. When asked in September 1986 to describe his political ideology, Fencik remarked, "maybe an independent Republican." In a 2022 radio interview, Fencik said while he believes he would be able to impact positive change if he were to become mayor of Chicago, he currently held no intention of seeking that office.

In October 2012, the Illinois Lottery Board unanimously voted to name Fencik as its chairman.

== Personal life ==
Fencik and his wife Sandy have two children, Garrison and Evan. He is of Polish descent.
