= Dan Rains =

American football player (born 1956)

No. 53
- Position: Linebacker

Personal information
- Born: April 26, 1956 (age 70); Rochester, Pennsylvania, U.S.
- Listed height: 6 ft 1 in (1.85 m)
- Listed weight: 224 lb (102 kg)

Career information
- High school: Hopewell (Pennsylvania)
- College: Cincinnati
- NFL draft: 1978: undrafted

Career history
- Philadelphia Eagles (1978)*; Chicago Bears (1982–1986)
- * Offseason or practice squad member only

Career NFL statistics
- Fumble recoveries: 2
- Stats at Pro Football Reference

Daniel Paul Rains (born April 26, 1956) is an American former professional football player who was a linebacker for four seasons with the Chicago Bears of the National Football League (NFL). He played college football for the Cincinnati Bearcats. He was a member of the 1985 Chicago team that won Super Bowl XX following the 1985 NFL season. He was also a member of the "Shuffling Crew" in the video for "The Super Bowl Shuffle".

Rains was the fullback of fellow Hopewell teammate, Tony Dorsett of the Pittsburgh Panthers and Dallas Cowboys fame.
