= Mike Richardson (American football, born 1961) =

American football player (born 1961)

No. 27
- Position: Cornerback

Personal information
- Born: May 23, 1961 (age 65); Compton, California, U.S.
- Listed height: 6 ft 0 in (1.83 m)
- Listed weight: 187 lb (85 kg)

Career information
- High school: Compton
- College: Arizona State
- NFL draft: 1983: 2nd round, 33rd overall pick

Career history
- Chicago Bears (1983–1988); Los Angeles Raiders (1989)*; San Francisco 49ers (1989)
- * Offseason or practice squad member only

Awards and highlights
- 2× Super Bowl champion (XX, XXIV); 2× Consensus All-American (1981, 1982); 2× First-team All-Pac-10 (1981, 1982); Second-team All-Pac-10 (1980)

Career NFL statistics
- Interceptions: 20
- Tackles: 274
- Touchdowns: 1
- Stats at Pro Football Reference

Michael Calvin Richardson (born May 23, 1961), also known as "L.A. Mike", is an American former professional football player who was a cornerback for seven seasons in the National Football League (NFL) during the 1980s. He played college football for the Arizona State Sun Devils. He was a starter for the 1985 Super Bowl XX winning Chicago Bears.

== College career ==
He played college football for Arizona State University, and was recognized as an All-American in 1981 and 1982. Richardson was only the 6th All-American in ASU history at the time, and the second player ever to achieve it twice. In his final two seasons, the Sun Devils went 19–4, and he closed out his college career with a win over University of Oklahoma in the 1982 Fiesta Bowl. In his four years at Arizona State, he intercepted 18 passes, returning them for 131 yards and two touchdowns.

== Professional career ==
He played professionally for the NFL's Chicago Bears and San Francisco 49ers, and won Super Bowl XX as a member of the 1985 Bears.

Richardson finished his 7-season career with 20 interceptions, which he returned for 247 yards and a touchdown. He also recorded 4 fumble recoveries. He was a featured soloist of the "Shuffling Crew" in the Super Bowl Shuffle novelty music video in 1985. His line in the song "I like to steal it and make em pay" would be reflected in his performance on the field, as he finished the season with 174 return yards from just 4 interceptions.

== Personal life ==
In 2008 Richardson faced a 13-year sentence for possession of methamphetamine and crack cocaine. It was his 21st drug conviction since the end of his football career. Former teammate Richard Dent and coach Mike Ditka both supported Richardson being sent to a rehab facility rather than prison. The judge ultimately sentenced Richardson to a year in prison and an extended probation period, violation of which would result in Richardson serving the remainder of a 13-year sentence.

In late December 2020, Richardson was arrested for homicide in Phoenix, in relation to a suspected cocaine transaction gone awry.
