= Richard Dent =

American football player and coach (born 1960)

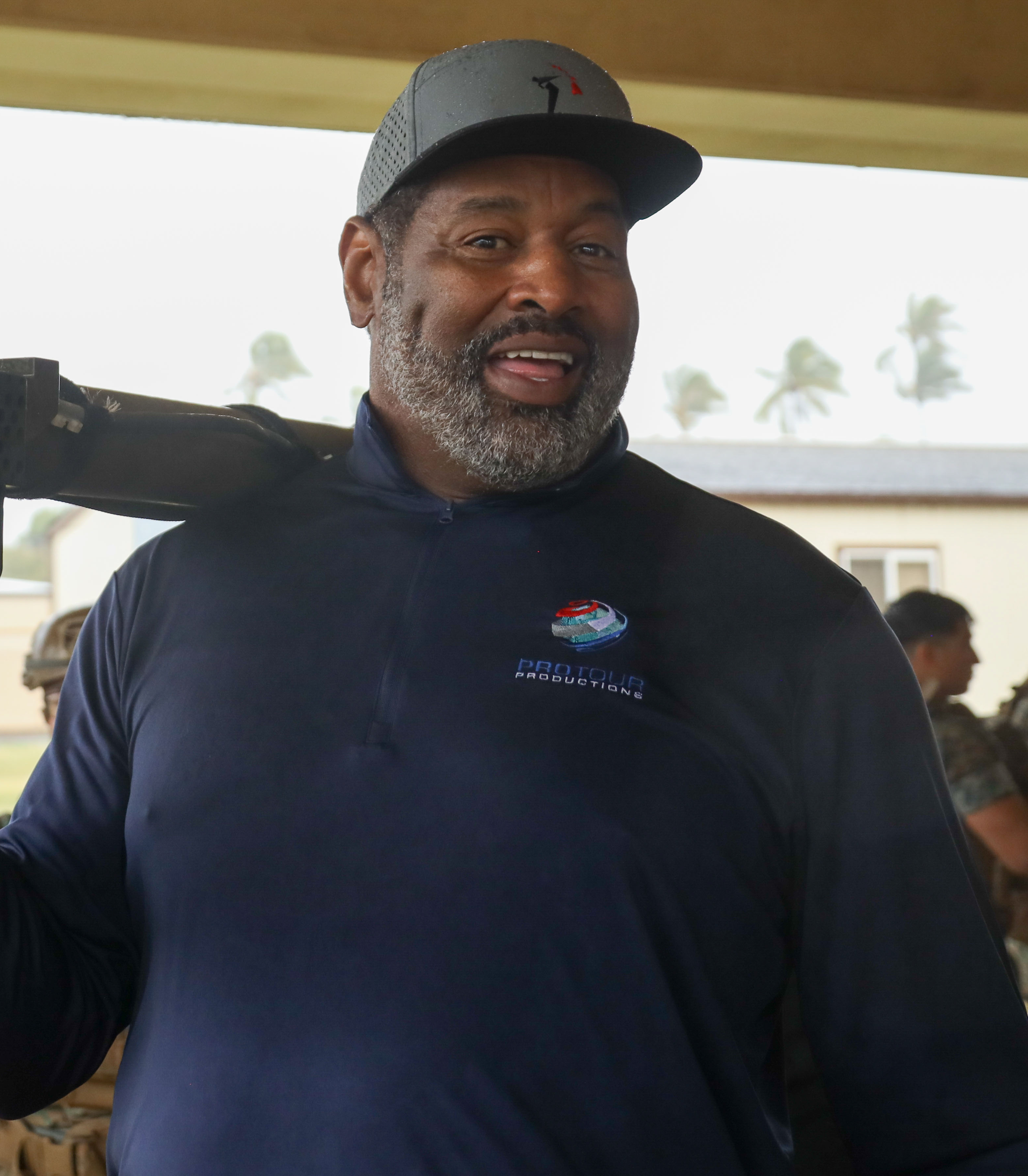
- Dent in 2025

No. 95, 96
- Position: Defensive end

Personal information
- Born: December 13, 1960 (age 65); Atlanta, Georgia, U.S.
- Listed height: 6 ft 5 in (1.96 m)
- Listed weight: 265 lb (120 kg)

Career information
- High school: J. C. Murphy (Atlanta)
- College: Tennessee State (1979–1982)
- NFL draft: 1983: 8th round, 203rd overall pick

Career history
- Chicago Bears (1983–1993); San Francisco 49ers (1994); Chicago Bears (1995); Indianapolis Colts (1996); Philadelphia Eagles (1997)

Awards and highlights
- 2× Super Bowl champion (XX, XXIX); Super Bowl MVP (XX); First-team All-Pro (1985); 3× Second-team All-Pro (1984, 1988, 1990); 4× Pro Bowl (1984, 1985, 1990, 1993); NFL sacks leader (1985); 100 greatest Bears of All-Time

Career NFL statistics
- Total tackles: 677
- Sacks: 137.5
- Safeties: 1
- Forced fumbles: 37
- Fumble recoveries: 13
- Interceptions: 8
- Interception yards: 89
- Defensive touchdowns: 2
- Stats at Pro Football Reference
- Pro Football Hall of Fame

Richard Lamar Dent (born December 13, 1960) is an American former professional football player who was a defensive end in the National Football League (NFL), primarily for the Chicago Bears. He was the MVP of the Super Bowl XX. He was elected to the Pro Football Hall of Fame in 2011.

== Professional career ==
=== Chicago Bears ===
After playing four years at Tennessee State University, Dent was selected in the eighth round by the Bears, with the 203rd overall pick in the 1983 NFL draft. At 6 ft 5 in, 265 lb (120 kg), Dent was a great pass rusher who beat offensive tackles with his speed and thrived in defensive coordinator Buddy Ryan's aggressive 46 defense. He was part of the core of great players who made the Bears' defenses of the 1980s legendary. Between 1984 and 1985, Dent recorded 34.5 sacks while recording a then team-record 17.5 sacks in the former season.

==== 1985 season ====
When the Bears went on to defeat the New England Patriots in a 46–10 landslide in Super Bowl XX, Dent was selected as the game's MVP. During the game, he had 1.5 sacks, forced two fumbles, and blocked a pass. Dent made a mere $90,000 in base salary for his efforts in 1985 ($269,000 in 2025 dollars). He was a featured soloist of the "Shuffling Crew" in the video, the "Super Bowl Shuffle" in 1985.

=== After Chicago ===
Dent would remain with the team until the end of the 1993 season, after the Bears had won just one playoff game since their loss to the San Francisco 49ers in the 1988 NFC Championship Game, and head coach Mike Ditka had been replaced by Dave Wannstedt.

Dent won another Super Bowl ring after spending the 1994 season under contract with the 49ers, though he spent almost the whole year injured. Injuries would continue to hamper Dent after his return to Chicago in 1995. He would spend 1996 and 1997 with the Indianapolis Colts and Philadelphia Eagles, respectively, playing the so-called designated pass rusher for them.

Dent retired after the 1997 season. His lifetime statistics included 137.5 sacks and eight interceptions; he returned these picks for 89 yards and one touchdown. He also recovered 13 fumbles, returning them for 56 yards and one touchdown. He had 124.5 sacks during his first stint with the Bears, from 1983 to 1993. At the time of his retirement, his 137.5 sacks ranked him third in NFL history behind Reggie White and Bruce Smith.

=== Post-retirement ===
During Super Bowl XLIV, Dent joined other members of the 1985 Chicago Bears in resurrecting the "Super Bowl Shuffle" in a Boost Mobile commercial.

Dent was nominated numerous times for the Pro Football Hall of Fame and in 2005–2009 he was among the top 15 finalists in the selection process. After several years of unsuccessful nominations, he was finally selected for enshrinement in the Pro Football Hall of Fame in Canton, Ohio on February 5, 2011. His induction speech was notable for omitting any mention of both Ditka and Ryan, as he dedicated most of his speech to honoring the people in his early life, stating, "You've got to understand that this is all about people that touched you, that shaped you as a young man. Buddy and Mike got me as a finished product. This is not about football. This is about life. This is about who helps you in life and to help you fulfill some of your dreams. That's what it's about." Since his retirement Dent has had a difficult relationship with Ditka because he publicly blamed Ditka for the Bears' inability to repeat as Super Bowl champions. In a 2012 interview on WSCR, Dent argued that the Bears would have won at least three Super Bowls if they had been able to find any consistency at quarterback.

In addition to the Pro Football Hall of Fame, Dent was also inducted into the Georgia Sports Hall of Fame in 2008 and the Black College Football Hall of Fame in 2015.

== NFL career statistics ==
Legend
	Super Bowl MVP
	Won the Super Bowl
	Led the league
**Bold**	Career high

=== Regular season ===
Year	Team	Games		Tackles				Interceptions			Fumbles	
Year	Team	GP	GS	Cmb	Solo	Ast	Sck	Int	Yds	TD	FF	FR
1983	CHI	16	3	12	–	–	3.0	0	0	0	1	0
1984	CHI	16	10	39	–	–	**17.5**	0	0	0	4	1
1985	CHI	16	16	38	–	–	17.0	2	10	**1**	**7**	2
1986	CHI	15	14	75	–	–	11.5	0	0	0	4	0
1987	CHI	12	12	34	–	–	12.5	0	0	0	4	2
1988	CHI	13	12	61	–	–	10.5	0	0	0	3	1
1989	CHI	15	15	70	–	–	9.0	1	**30**	0	2	2
1990	CHI	14	14	81	–	–	12.0	**3**	21	0	2	**3**
1991	CHI	16	16	**84**	–	–	10.5	1	4	0	0	1
1992	CHI	16	16	82	–	–	8.5	0	0	0	6	1
1993	CHI	16	16	64	–	–	12.5	1	24	0	1	0
1994	SF	2	2	8	7	1	2.0	0	0	0	0	0
1995	CHI	3	1	1	1	0	0.0	0	0	0	0	0
1996	IND	16	1	15	**13**	2	6.5	0	0	0	2	0
1997	PHI	15	0	13	10	**3**	4.5	0	0	0	1	0
Career		203	150	677	31	6	137.5	8	89	1	37	13

== Personal life ==
According to a DNA analysis, he descended mainly from Mende people of Sierra Leone and Balanta people of Guinea Bissau. He is the godfather of football player Ahmaad Smith.

Richard lives in Chicago and has four children: Mary, Sarah, R.J., and Shiloh. His son R.J. is a football player who played WR at Stevenson High School, and now plays at Ohio’s Miami University.
