= Calvin Thomas (American football) =

American football player (born 1960)

No. 33, 32
- Position: Running back

Personal information
- Born: January 7, 1960 (age 66); St. Louis, Missouri, U.S.
- Listed height: 5 ft 11 in (1.80 m)
- Listed weight: 239 lb (108 kg)

Career information
- High school: McKinley (St. Louis)
- College: Illinois
- NFL draft: 1982: undrafted

Career history
- Chicago Bears (1982–1988); Denver Broncos (1988)

Awards and highlights
- Super Bowl champion (XX)

Career NFL statistics
- Rushing yards: 672
- Rushing average: 3.9
- Rushing Touchdowns: 5
- Stats at Pro Football Reference

Calvin Lewis Thomas (born January 7, 1960) is an American former professional football player who was a running back for seven seasons for the Chicago Bears and Denver Broncos of the National Football League (NFL). He played college football for the Illinois Fighting Illini. As a member of the Bears, he won Super Bowl XX.

He is best known as the saxophone player in "The Super Bowl Shuffle".
