= Keith Van Horne =

American football player (born 1957)

No. 78
- Position: Offensive tackle

Personal information
- Born: November 6, 1957 (age 68); Mt. Lebanon, Pennsylvania, U.S.
- Listed height: 6 ft 6 in (1.98 m)
- Listed weight: 281 lb (127 kg)

Career information
- High school: Fullerton Union (Fullerton, California)
- College: USC
- NFL draft: 1981: 1st round, 11th overall pick

Career history
- Chicago Bears (1981–1993)

Awards and highlights
- Super Bowl champion (XX); PFWA All-Rookie Team (1981); 100 greatest Bears of All-Time; National champion (1978); Consensus All-American (1980); 2× First-team All-Pac-10 (1979, 1980)

Career NFL statistics
- Games played: 186
- Games started: 169
- Fumble recoveries: 7
- Stats at Pro Football Reference

Keith Van Horne (born November 6, 1957) is an American former professional football player who was an offensive tackle in the National Football League (NFL) for 13 seasons during the 1980s and 1990s. He played college football for the USC Trojans and earned consensus All-American honors. Van Horne was selected in the first round of the 1981 NFL draft, and played professionally for the NFL's Chicago Bears. He is also the former son-in-law of former Vice President of the United States Walter Mondale.

== Early life ==
Van Horne was born in Mt. Lebanon, Pennsylvania. He attended Fullerton High School in Fullerton, California. His Fullerton football varsity teammates included future NFL New Orleans Saints tight end Hoby Brenner.

== College career ==
He attended the University of Southern California, where he played for the USC Trojans football team from 1977 to 1980. He was part of the Trojans 1978 National Championship team. As a senior in 1980, Van Horne was recognized as a consensus first-team All-American.

== Professional career ==
The Chicago Bears selected Van Horne in the first round (11th pick overall) of the 1981 NFL draft, and he played for the Bears from 1981 though 1993. He was a member of the 1985 Chicago Bears team, winners of Super Bowl XX. In his 13 NFL seasons, he played in 186 games for the Bears, and started 169 of them.

== Personal life ==
Van Horne was married to Eleanor Mondale from 1988 to 1989. He lives in the Chicago suburb of Riverwoods.
