= Mark Bortz =

American football player (born 1961)

No. 62
- Position: Guard

Personal information
- Born: February 12, 1961 (age 65); Pardeeville, Wisconsin, U.S.
- Listed height: 6 ft 6 in (1.98 m)
- Listed weight: 282 lb (128 kg)

Career information
- High school: Pardeeville
- College: Iowa
- NFL draft: 1983: 8th round, 219th overall pick

Career history
- Chicago Bears (1983–1994)

Awards and highlights
- Super Bowl champion (XX); First-team All-Pro (1990); 2× Pro Bowl (1988, 1990); 100 greatest Bears of All-Time; Second-team All-American (1982); 2× First-team All-Big Ten (1981, 1982)

Career NFL statistics
- Games played: 171
- Games started: 155
- Fumble recoveries: 2
- Stats at Pro Football Reference

Mark Steven Bortz (born February 12, 1961) is an American former professional football player who was a guard for the Chicago Bears of the National Football League (NFL). He played college football for the Iowa Hawkeyes and was selected by the Bears in the 1983 NFL draft.

== Professional career ==
The Bears' 1983 draft class is regarded as one of the best all-time; providing seven starters, including three for the offensive line - Bortz, fellow guard Tom Thayer, and tackle Jim Covert. When interviewed about the draft class for nfl.com, Coach Mike Ditka stated that Bortz was a converted defensive player, with great feet, and he formed part of a solid offensive line.

A two-time Pro Bowler, Bortz won a Super Bowl as a member of the 1985 Chicago Bears. He also holds the record for most playoff appearances by a Bear with 13.

== Personal life ==
On March 7, 2013, a two-story house belonging to Bortz in Liberty, Illinois burned down. Firefighters had attempted to save the house, but the house was fully engulfed in flames by the time of their arrival.
