= 1989 Chicago Bears season =

NFL team season

- Owner: Virginia Halas McCaskey
- Head coach: Mike Ditka
- Home stadium: Soldier Field

Results
- Record: 6–10
- Division place: 4th NFC Central
- Playoffs: Did not qualify

The Chicago Bears played their 70th regular season in the National Football League (NFL) in 1989. This for first time since 1981 Jim McMahon was not on the opening day roster he was traded to San Diego Chargers in offseason. The Bears were looking to win the NFC Central for a sixth consecutive season, but instead finished with a 6–10 record and missed the playoffs for the first time since 1983. The Bears’ offseason moves prior to this season had consequences for years afterward as the pieces from Super Bowl XX’s team slowly began to leave or retire.

== Offseason ==
=== NFL draft ===
1989 Chicago Bears draft
Round	Pick	Player	Position	College	Notes
1	11	Donnell Woolford *	Safety	Clemson	from L. A. Raiders
1	12	Trace Armstrong *	Defensive end	Florida	from Washington
2	36	John Roper	Linebacker	Texas A&M	
2	54	Dave Zawatson	Guard	California	
3	65	Jerry Fontenot	Center	Texas A&M	
4	95	Markus Paul	Defensive back	Syracuse	
5	130	Mark Green	Running back	Notre Dame	
5	136	Greg Gilbert	Linebacker	Alabama	
7	189	Richard Brothers	Defensive back	Arkansas	
7	192	Brent Snyder	Quarterback	Utah State	
8	216	Tony Woods	Defensive tackle	Oklahoma	
8	221	Chris Dyko	Tackle	Washington State	
9	243	LaSalle Harper	Linebacker	Arkansas	
9	248	Byron Sanders	Running back	Northwestern	
10	270	Todd Millikan	Tight end	Nebraska	
10	277	John Simpson	Wide receiver	Baylor	
11	297	Joe Nelms	Defensive tackle	California	
11	304	George Streeter	Defensive back	Notre Dame	
12	330	Freddy Weygand	Wide receiver	Auburn	
12	333	Anthony Phillips	Guard	Oklahoma	
Made roster * Made at least one Pro Bowl during career

=== Undrafted free agents ===
1989 undrafted free agents of note
Player	Position	College
Sammie Archer	Wide receiver	Oregon
Alex Armenteros	Defensive back	Bethune–Cookman
Bryan Bero	Fullback	Utah
Tony Buford	Wide receiver	Indiana
John Budde	Defensive end	Michigan State
James Coley	Tight end	Clemson
Matt Gurley	Fullback	Texas A&M
Eric Hoffman	Linebacker	Western Michigan
Mike Husar	Guard	Michigan
Steve Hyche	Linebacker	West Alabama
Garrett Limbrick	Fullback	Oklahoma State
Randy Marriott	Wide receiver	North Carolina
Mike McCabe	Punter	Illinois State
Pat Ray	Defensive back	Missouri
Mike Sellar	Wide receiver	UC Davis
Don Shrader	Guard	Indiana
Kent Sullivan	Punter	California Lutheran
Chad Sydnor	Defensive back	Maryland
Brian Taylor	Fullback	Oregon State
Tom Waddle	Wide receiver	Boston College

== Staff ==
1989 Chicago Bears staff
Front office: Chairman of the board – Ed McCaskey; President and chief executive officer – Michael McCaskey; Vice president of player personnel – Bill Tobin; Assistant director of player personnel – Rod Graves; Research and quality control – Jim Dooley; Head coaches: Head coach – Mike Ditka; Offensive coaches: Offensive coordinator – Greg Landry; Running backs – Johnny Roland; Wide receivers – Vic Rapp; Offensive line – Dick Stanfel	Defensive coaches: Defensive coordinator – Vince Tobin; Defensive line – John Levra; Linebackers – Dave McGinnis; Defensive backs – Jim LaRue; Special teams coaches: Special teams/tight ends – Steve Kazor

== Roster ==
1989 Chicago Bears roster
Quarterbacks: 4 Jim Harbaugh; 18 Mike Tomczak; Running backs: 35 Neal Anderson; 31 Mark Green; 25 Brad Muster FB; 20 Thomas Sanders KR; 26 Matt Suhey FB; 27 Brian Taylor; Wide receivers: 82 Wendell Davis; 29 Dennis Gentry KR; 88 Glen Kozlowski; 85 Dennis McKinnon PR; 84 Ron Morris; 87 Tom Waddle; Tight ends: 86 Cap Boso; 80 James Thornton	Offensive linemen: 62 Mark Bortz G; 74 Jim Covert T; 68 Chris Dyko T; 67 Jerry Fontenot C; 63 Jay Hilgenberg C; 57 Tom Thayer G; 78 Keith Van Horne T; 73 John Wojciechowski T; 64 Dave Zawatson G; Defensive linemen: 93 Trace Armstrong DE; 94 Dick Chapura DT; 95 Richard Dent DE; 76 Steve McMichael DT; 75 John Shannon DE; 65 Tony Woods DE	Linebackers: 92 Troy Johnson OLB; 53 Dante Jones MLB; 52 Mickey Pruitt OLB; 59 Ron Rivera OLB; 55 John Roper OLB; 50 Mike Singletary MLB; Defensive backs: 22 Dave Duerson SS; 23 Shaun Gayle FS; 24 Vestee Jackson CB; 43 Lorenzo Lynch CB; 36 Markus Paul FS; 30 George Streeter SS; 49 David Tate SS; 21 Donnell Woolford CB; Special teams: 8 Maury Buford P; 6 Kevin Butler K	Reserve lists: 37 Maurice Douglass CB (IR); 99 Dan Hampton DT (IR); 58 Steve Hyche LB (IR); 51 Jim Morrissey LB (IR); 60 Steve O'Malley DT (IR); 72 William Perry DT (IR); 32 Lemuel Stinson CB (IR); Practice squad: 33 Bryan Bero FB; 89 James Coley TE; 12 Brent Snyder QB; 47 active, 7 inactive, 3 practice squad Rookies in italics

== Regular season ==
=== Schedule ===
Week	Date	Opponent	Result	Record	Venue	Attendance
1	September 10	Cincinnati Bengals	**W** 17–14	1–0	Soldier Field	64,730
2	September 17	**Minnesota Vikings**	**W** 38–7	2–0	Soldier Field	66,475
3	September 24	at **Detroit Lions**	**W** 47–27	3–0	Pontiac Silverdome	71,418
4	October 2	Philadelphia Eagles	**W** 27–13	4–0	Soldier Field	66,625
5	October 8	at **Tampa Bay Buccaneers**	**L** 35–42	4–1	Tampa Stadium	72,077
6	October 15	Houston Oilers	**L** 33–28	4–2	Soldier Field	64,383
7	October 23	at Cleveland Browns	**L** 7–27	4–3	Cleveland Municipal Stadium	78,722
8	October 29	Los Angeles Rams	**W** 20–10	5–3	Soldier Field	65,506
9	November 5	at **Green Bay Packers**	**L** 13–14	5–4	Lambeau Field	56,556
10	November 12	at Pittsburgh Steelers	**W** 20–0	6–4	Three Rivers Stadium	56,505
11	November 19	**Tampa Bay Buccaneers**	**L** 31–32	6–5	Soldier Field	63,826
12	November 26	at Washington Redskins	**L** 14–38	6–6	RFK Stadium	50,044
13	December 3	at **Minnesota Vikings**	**L** 16–27	6–7	Hubert H. Humphrey Metrodome	60,664
14	December 10	Detroit Lions	**L** 17–27	6–8	Soldier Field	52,650
15	December 17	**Green Bay Packers**	**L** 28–40	6–9	Soldier Field	44,781
16	December 24	at San Francisco 49ers	**L** 0–26	6–10	Candlestick Park	60,207

Note: Intra-division opponents are in bold text.

=== Game summaries ===
==== Week 1 vs Bengals ====
Week One: Cincinnati Bengals (0–0) at Chicago Bears (0–0)

Quarter	1	2	3	4	Total
Bengals	7	0	7	0	**14**
**Bears**	0	7	3	7	**17**

at Soldier Field, Chicago, Illinois

- Date: September 10
- Game time: 1:00 p.m.
- Game weather: 64 °F (18 °C)
- Game attendance: 64,730
- Referee: Jerry Seeman
- TV announcers (NBC): Dick Enberg and Bill Walsh
- Box Score, Box Score

Game information

First quarter

- CIN – James Brooks 4-yard pass from Boomer Esiason (Jim Breech kick), 9:52. Bengals 7–0.

Second quarter

- CHI – Mike Tomczak 11-yard run (Kevin Butler kick), 0:10. Tie 7–7.

Third quarter

- CIN – Ickey Woods 5-yard run (Jim Breech kick), 8:28. Bengals 14–7.
- CHI – Kevin Butler 29-yard field goal, 11:40. Bengals 14–10.

Fourth quarter

- CHI – James Thornton 20-yard pass from Mike Tomczak (Kevin Butler kick), 10:06. Bears 17–14.

Top passers

- CIN – Boomer Esiason – 18/36, 184 yards, TD
- CHI – Mike Tomczak – 10/24, 159 yards, TD, 2 INT

Top rushers

- CIN – James Brooks – 13 rushes, 88 yards
- CHI – Neal Anderson – 21 rushes, 146 yards

Top receivers

- CIN – James Brooks – 5 receptions, 46 yards, TD
- CHI – James Thornton – 4 receptions, 86 yards, TD

==== Week 2 vs Minnesota Vikings ====
Week 2: Minnesota Vikings at Chicago Bears

Quarter	1	2	3	4	Total
Vikings	0	7	0	0	**7**
**Bears**	7	3	0	28	**38**

at Soldier Field, Chicago, Illinois

- Date: September 17, 1989
- Game time: 12:00 p.m. CST
- Game weather: Overcast, 62 °F (17 °C)
- TV announcers (CBS): Pat Summerall and John Madden

Game information

**First quarter**

**Second quarter**

**Third quarter**

**Fourth quarter**

Top passers

- MIN – Wade Wilson – 24/42, 253 yards, TD, 4 INT
- CHI – Mike Tomczak – 10/26, 142 yards, TD, INT

Top rushers

- MIN – Alfred Anderson – 5 rushes, 25 yards
- CHI – Neal Anderson – 23 rushes, 97 yards, 2 TD

Top receivers

- MIN – Anthony Carter – 6 receptions, 80 yards
- CHI – Neal Anderson – 3 receptions, 58 yards, TD

==== Week 3: at Detroit Lions ====
Week 3: Chicago Bears at Detroit Lions – Game summary

Quarter	1	2	3	4	Total
**Bears**	10	10	13	14	**47**
Lions	0	13	7	7	**27**

at Pontiac Silverdome, Detroit, Michigan

- Date: September 24, 1989
- Game time: 1:00 p.m. EDT
- Game attendance: 71,418
- TV announcers (CBS): Tim Brant and Dan Jiggetts
- Box score

Game information

**First quarter**

- CHI – Kevin Butler 21-yard field goal, 7:44. Chicago 3–0 **Drive: 12 plays, 60 yards.**
- CHI – Brad Muster 6-yard rush (Kevin Butler kick good), 1:13. Chicago 10–0 **Drive: 9 plays, 78 yards.**

**Second quarter**

- DET – Barry Sanders 3-yard rush (Eddie Murray kick good), 10:52. Chicago 10–7 **Drive: 9 plays, 73 yards.**
- CHI – Dennis McKinnon 40-yard pass from Mike Tomczak (Kevin Butler kick good), 9:13. Chicago 17–7 **Drive: 3 plays, 78 yards.**
- DET – Eddie Murray 40-yard field goal, 6:27. Chicago 17–10 **Drive: 8 plays, 46 yards.**
- CHI – Kevin Butler 22-yard field goal, 1:58. Chicago 20–10 **Drive: 9 plays, 76 yards.**
- DET – Eddie Murray 48-yard field goal, 0:27. Chicago 20–13 **Drive: 7 plays, 31 yards.**

**Third quarter**

- CHI – Neal Anderson 53-yard rush (Kevin Butler kick good), 12:31. Chicago 27–13 **Drive: 4 plays, 70 yards.**
- DET – Bob Gagliano 1-yard rush (Eddie Murray kick good), 10:01. Chicago 27–20 **Drive: 5 plays, 53 yards.**
- CHI – Kevin Butler 25-yard field goal, 4:15. Chicago 30–20 **Drive: 8 plays, 72 yards.**
- CHI – Kevin Butler 32-yard field goal, 0:54. Chicago 33–20 **Drive: 5 plays, 19 yards.**

**Fourth quarter**

- CHI – Brad Muster 3-yard pass from Mike Tomczak (Kevin Butler kick good), 6:00. Chicago 40–20 **Drive: 3 plays, 10 yards**
- CHI – Jim Harbaugh 1-yard rush (Kevin Butler kick good), 3:46. Chicago 47–20 **Drive: 3 plays, 42 yards.**
- DET – Bob Gagliano 1-yard rush (Eddie Murray kick good), 1:59. Chicago 47–27 **Drive: 4 plays, 35 yards.**

**Top passers**

- CHI – Mike Tomczak – 17/25, 302 yards, 2 TD
- DET – Bob Gagliano – 9/19, 126 yards, 3 INT

**Top receivers**

- CHI – Dennis McKinnon – 3 receptions, 62 yards, TD
- DET – Richard Johnson – 4 receptions, 62 yards

**Top rushers**

- CHI – Neal Anderson – 16 rushes, 116 yards, TD
- DET – Barry Sanders – 18 rushes, 126 yards, TD

==== Week 9 at Green Bay Packers ====
Week 9: Chicago Bears at Green Bay Packers

Quarter	1	2	3	4	Total
Bears	3	0	10	0	**13**
**Packers**	7	0	0	7	**14**

at Lambeau Field, Green Bay, Wisconsin

- Date: November 5, 1989
- Game time: 12:00 p.m. CST
- Game weather: Overcast, 47 °F (8 °C)
- Referee: Tom Dooley
- TV announcers (CBS): Dick Stockton and Dan Fouts

Game information

**First quarter**

**Second quarter**

**Third quarter**

**Fourth quarter**

Top passers

- CHI – Jim Harbaugh – 16/30, 203 yards
- GB – Don Majkowski – 23/40, 299 yards, 2 TDs, INT

Top rushers

- CHI – Neal Anderson – 15 rushes, 58 yards
- GB – Brent Fullwood – 10 rushes, 38 yards

Top receivers

- CHI – Brad Muster – 6 receptions, 68 yards
- GB – Brent Fullwood – 2 receptions, 76 yards

=== Standings ===
NFC Central
	W	L	T	PCT	DIV	CONF	PF	PA	STK
Minnesota Vikings^{(3)}	10	6	0	.625	6–2	8–4	351	275	W1
Green Bay Packers	10	6	0	.625	5–3	10–4	362	356	W2
Detroit Lions	7	9	0	.438	4–4	6–6	312	364	W5
Chicago Bears	6	10	0	.375	2–6	4–8	358	377	L6
Tampa Bay Buccaneers	5	11	0	.313	3–5	5–7	320	419	L4
