= 1992 Chicago Bears season =

NFL team season

- Head coach: Mike Ditka
- Home stadium: Soldier Field

Results
- Record: 5–11
- Division place: 4th NFC Central
- Playoffs: Did not qualify

The 1992 Chicago Bears season was their 73rd regular season completed in the National Football League (NFL). The Bears were looking to get back into the playoffs for a third straight year and improve on their 11–5, second-place finish in the NFC Central Division. The Bears started the season with a 4–3 record but ended up losing eight of their remaining nine games, including six straight, and finished a disappointing 5–11, tied for last in the NFC Central with the Detroit Lions and Tampa Bay Buccaneers (the Buccaneers finished third, the Bears fourth and the Lions fifth based upon conference winning percentage).

The Bears' poor record resulted in head coach Mike Ditka being fired on January 5, 1993, after eleven seasons. Dave Wannstedt, who was serving as the Dallas Cowboys' defensive coordinator, was hired to take his place. Ditka's Bears teams went a cumulative 106–62, and made the playoffs in seven out of 11 seasons since 1982, including a win in Super Bowl XX in 1985, with what is considered one of the best defenses in NFL history. He would return to coaching in 1997 as head coach of the New Orleans Saints. Additionally, this would mark the final season for future Hall of Fame middle linebacker Mike Singletary.

== Offseason ==
Additions	Subtractions
LS Mark Rodenhauser (Chargers)	RB Johnny Bailey (Cardinals)
	G Jay Hilgenberg (Browns)
	T Ron Mattes (Colts)

=== NFL draft ===
1992 Chicago Bears draft
Round	Pick	Player	Position	College	Notes
1	22	Alonzo Spellman	Defensive end	Ohio State	
2	49	Troy Auzenne	Offensive tackle	California	
3	80	Jeremy Lincoln	Cornerback	Tennessee	
4	107	Will Furrer	Quarterback	Virginia Tech	
5	134	Todd Harrison	Tight end	North Carolina State	
6	161	Mark Berry	Defensive back	Texas	
7	192	John Brown	Wide receiver	Houston	
9	246	Mirko Jurkovic	Guard	Notre Dame	
10	273	Nikki Fisher	Running back	Virginia	
11	304	Louis Age	Offensive tackle	Louisiana–Lafayette	
12	331	Chris Wilson	Linebacker	Oklahoma	
Made roster † Pro Football Hall of Fame * Made at least one Pro Bowl during career

=== Undrafted free agents ===
1992 undrafted free agents of note
Player	Position	College
Tyrone Ashley	Running back	Ole Miss
Kelly Blackwell	Tight end	TCU
Mark Bounds	Punter	Texas Tech
Charles Boyce	Cornerback	Sam Houston State
Jim Deter	Defensive tackle	Penn State
Maxie Graham	Defensive end	Western Illinois
Jeff Ireland	Kicker	Baylor
Darron Johnson	Wide receiver	Angelo State
Eric Johnson	Defensive end	Stephen F. Austin
Walter Jones	Wide Receiver	Duke
Brendan Lynch	Linebacker	Wisconsin
Marcus Mickel	Wide receiver	Virginia Tech
Peyton Minter	Defensive end	Purdue
David Nobbe	Tackle	Indianapolis
Ed O’Bradovich	Linebacker	Michigan State
Marlon Primous	Safety	Illinois
Alex Rankin	Guard/Long Snapper	Angelo State
Jim Schwantz	Linebacker	Purdue
Travis Talton	Running back	UW–Whitewater
Robert Taylor	Fullback	Mississippi College
Gene Thomas	Wide receiver	Maryland
John Wiley	Safety	Auburn
Arnie Williams	Linebacker	Southern Miss

== Staff ==
1992 Chicago Bears staff
Front office: Chairman of the Board – Ed McCaskey; President and Chief Executive Officer – Michael McCaskey; Vice President of Player Personnel – Bill Tobin; Director of Finance – Ted Phillips; Assistant Director of Player Personnel – Rod Graves; Head coaches: Head Coach – Mike Ditka; Offensive coaches: Offensive Coordinator – Greg Landry; Running backs – Johnny Roland; Wide receivers – Vic Rapp; Tight ends – Steve Kazor; Offensive Line – Dick Stanfel	Defensive coaches: Defensive Coordinator – Vince Tobin; Defensive Line – John Levra; Linebackers – Dave McGinnis; Defensive backs – Zaven Yaralian; Special teams coaches: Special Teams – Danny Abramowicz; Strength and conditioning: Strength Coordinator –Clyde Emrich; Physical Development Coordinator – Russ Riederer

=== Final roster ===
1992 Chicago Bears roster
Quarterbacks (QB): 2 Will Furrer; 4 Jim Harbaugh; 10 Peter Tom Willis; Running backs (RB): 35 Neal Anderson; 44 Bob Christian FB; 31 Mark Green KR; 33 Darren Lewis KR; 25 Brad Muster FB; Wide receivers (WR): 82 Wendell Davis; 29 Dennis Gentry KR; 81 Anthony Morgan; 83 Eric Wright; Tight ends (TE): 89 Kelly Blackwell; 85 Keith Jennings	Offensive linemen (OL): 79 Louis Age T; 70 Troy Auzenne T; 62 Mark Bortz G; 67 Jerry Fontenot C; 58 Jay Leeuwenburg C; 57 Tom Thayer G; 60 Stan Thomas T; 78 Keith Van Horne T; 73 John Wojciechowski G; Defensive linemen (DL): 93 Trace Armstrong DE; 95 Richard Dent DE; 76 Steve McMichael DT; 72 William Perry DT; 96 Tim Ryan DE; 90 Alonzo Spellman DE; 71 James Williams DT; 97 Chris Zorich DT	Linebackers (LB): 54 Ron Cox OLB; 51 Jim Morrissey OLB; 59 Ron Rivera OLB; 55 John Roper OLB; 65 Jim Schwantz OLB; 50 Mike Singletary MLB; Defensive backs (DB): 20 Mark Carrier FS; 37 Maurice Douglass CB; 24 Richard Fain CB; 23 Shaun Gayle SS; 36 Markus Paul SS; 32 Lemuel Stinson CB; 49 David Tate FS; 21 Donnell Woolford CB; Special teams (ST): 6 Kevin Butler K; 17 Chris Gardocki P	Reserve: 64 Mirko Jurkovic G (IR); 88 Glen Kozlowski WR (IR); 53 Dante Jones LB (IR); 39 Jeremy Lincoln CB (IR); 26 John Mangum CB (IR); 84 Ron Morris WR (IR); 80 James Thornton TE (IR); 87 Tom Waddle (IR); 86 Barry Wagner WR (IR); Rookies in italics 47 active, 9 reserve

== Regular season ==
=== Schedule ===
Week	Date	Opponent	Result	Attendance
1	September 6	Detroit Lions	W 27–24	63,672
2	September 13	at New Orleans Saints	L 6–28	68,591
3	September 21	New York Giants	L 14–27	63,444
4	September 27	Atlanta Falcons	W 41–31	63,528
5	October 4	at Minnesota Vikings	L 20–21	60,992
6	Bye			
7	October 18	Tampa Bay Buccaneers	W 31–14	61,412
8	October 25	at Green Bay Packers	W 30–10	59,435
9	November 2	Minnesota Vikings	L 10–38	61,257
10	November 8	Cincinnati Bengals	L 28–31	56,120
11	November 15	at Tampa Bay Buccaneers	L 17–20	69,102
12	November 22	Green Bay Packers	L 3–17	56,170
13	November 29	at Cleveland Browns	L 14–27	73,578
14	December 7	at Houston Oilers	L 7–24	62,193
15	December 13	Pittsburgh Steelers	W 30–6	52,904
16	December 20	at Detroit Lions	L 3–16	72,777
17	December 27	at Dallas Cowboys	L 14–27	63,101

=== Game summaries ===
==== Week 8: at Green Bay Packers ====
Chicago Bears at Green Bay Packers

Team	1	2	3	4	Total
• Bears	3	17	3	7	30
Packers	0	10	0	0	10

- Date: Sunday, October 25
- Location: Lambeau Field, Green Bay, Wisconsin
- Game start: 12:00 p.m. CST
- Television network: CBS
- Source: Pro-Football-Reference.com

Scoring summary
1	Bears	Kevin Butler 18-yard field goal	Bears 3–0
2	Packers	Chris Jacke 51-yard field goal	Tie 3–3
2	Bears	Brad Muster 1-yard run (Kevin Butler kick)	Bears 10–3
2	Bears	Keith Jennings 4-yard pass from Jim Harbaugh (Kevin Butler kick)	Bears 17–3
2	Packers	Sterling Sharpe 10-yard pass from Brett Favre (Chris Jacke kick)	Bears 17–10
2	Bears	Kevin Butler 30-yard field goal	Bears 20–10
3	Bears	Kevin Butler 21-yard field goal	Bears 23–10
4	Bears	Darren Lewis 30-yard run (Kevin Butler kick)	Bears 30–10

==== Week 15 vs Steelers ====
Week Fifteen: Pittsburgh Steelers (10–3) at Chicago Bears (4–9)

Quarter	1	2	3	4	Total
Steelers	0	3	0	3	6
Bears	3	10	7	10	30

at Soldier Field, Chicago, Illinois

- Date: December 13, 1992
- Game time: 1:00 p.m. EST
- Game weather: 34 °F (1 °C)
- Game attendance: 52, 904
- Referee: Gerald Austin
- TV announcers (NBC): Marv Albert and Bill Parcells
- Pro-Football-Reference, The Football Database

Game information

First quarter

- CHI – Kevin Butler 37-yard field goal, 3:40. Bears 3–0. Drive:

Second quarter

- CHI – Darren Lewis 3-yard run (Kevin Butler kick), 6:27. Bears 10–0. Drive:
- CHI – Kevin Butler 26-yard field goal, 0:50. Bears 13–0. Drive:
- PIT – Gary Anderson 38-yard field goal, 0:08. Bears 13–3. Drive:

Third quarter

- CHI – Neal Anderson 15-yard pass from Jim Harbaugh (Kevin Butler kick), 6:20. Bears 20–3. Drive:

Fourth quarter

- CHI – Kevin Butler 38-yard field goal, 13:35. Bears 23–3. Drive:
- PIT – Gary Anderson 38-yard field goal, 10:05. Bears 23–6. Drive:
- CHI – Neal Anderson 6-yard run (Kevin Butler kick), 3:02. Bears 30–6. Drive:

Top passers

- PIT – Bubby Brister – 14/31, 143 yards, 2 INT
- CHI – Jim Harbaugh – 11/21, 90 yards, TD

Top rushers

- PIT – Barry Foster – 12 rushes, 25 yards
- CHI – Neal Anderson – 11 rushes, 56 yards, TD

Top receivers

- PIT – Adrian Cooper – 3 receptions, 58 yards
- CHI – Wendell Davis – 3 receptions, 41 yards

Mike Singletary's final home game. It was the Bears' only win in their final nine games.

=== Standings ===
NFC Central
	W	L	T	PCT	DIV	CONF	PF	PA	STK
^{(3)} Minnesota Vikings	11	5	0	.688	7–1	8–4	374	249	W2
Green Bay Packers	9	7	0	.563	4–4	6–6	276	296	L1
Tampa Bay Buccaneers	5	11	0	.313	3–5	5–9	267	365	W1
Chicago Bears	5	11	0	.313	3–5	4–8	295	361	L2
Detroit Lions	5	11	0	.313	3–5	3–9	273	332	L1
