= Brian Piccolo Award =

Award given by the NFL's Chicago Bears

The Brian Piccolo Award is an honor that is given to players of the Chicago Bears. The award is given to one rookie and one veteran per season who best exemplifies the courage, loyalty, teamwork, dedication and sense of humor of the late Brian Piccolo, a running back for the Bears from 1966 until his death from cancer on June 16, 1970, at age 26.

== History ==
Brian Piccolo went un-drafted in the 1965 NFL Draft despite being named the ACC Player of the Year at Wake Forest (1964), where he led the nation with points (111) and yards rushing (1,044) as a senior. In 1965, Piccolo tried out for the Chicago Bears as a free agent and made the team. He progressed from the practice squad to the back-up of starting tailback Gale Sayers by 1967. For the 1969 season, Piccolo was named the starting fullback for the Chicago Bears.

On November 16, during the ninth game of the 1969 season in Atlanta, Piccolo voluntarily removed himself from the game due to extreme difficulty breathing on the field. When the team returned to Chicago, he received a medical examination and chest x-ray that revealed a malignancy. He was then diagnosed with embryonal cell carcinoma, an aggressive form of testicular cancer that had already spread to his chest cavity. After the diagnosis, Piccolo underwent surgery at Sloan-Kettering in New York City to remove the tumor. He had another surgery to remove his left lung and pectoral muscle in April 1970. Later in June of the same year, Piccolo started to feel chest pain and was re-admitted to the hospital, where doctors determined that the cancer had spread to other organs, most notably his liver. Piccolo died on Tuesday, June 16, 1970, at the age of 26. His courageous battle was later portrayed in the classic 1971 TV movie Brian's Song, starring James Caan as Piccolo.

When Piccolo died in 1970, embryonal cell carcinoma was 100% fatal. With advances in medicine over the years, more than 50% of patients with the disease are now cured.

The Brian Piccolo Award was originally awarded the same year as Piccolo's death (1970) to a Chicago Bears rookie who "best exemplifies the courage, loyalty, teamwork, dedication and sense of humor of the late Brian Piccolo".

In 1990, the Chicago Bears commissioned Chicago native and artist, Tom McKee, to design and sculpt the Brian Piccolo Award that is currently awarded. Each year this bronze sculpture is given to a Bears rookie and a veteran player (since 1992).

== Award winners ==
The Brian Piccolo Award ceremony is held at Halas Hall each year, where Bears center Olin Kreutz and wide receiver Johnny Knox received the 2009 trophy. Previous award winners include Brian Urlacher (2000, 2007), Charles Tillman (2003, 2008, 2013), Tommie Harris (2004), Devin Hester (2006), Greg Olsen (2007), Matt Forte (2008, 2015). Nick Roach and Stephen Paea were the recipients of the Award in 2012, while Tillman, Shea McClellin and Julius Peppers received the Award in 2013. The following year, Jordan Mills and Josh McCown were awarded, but Jay Cutler accepted McCown's award, due to McCown joining the Tampa Bay Buccaneers after the 2013 season.

=== Brian Piccolo Award winners ===
Year	Player	Position
2025	T. J. Edwards	LB
2025	Colston Loveland	TE
2024	T. J. Edwards (2)	LB
2024	Rome Odunze	WR
2023	Darnell Wright	OT
2023	T. J. Edwards (3)	LB
2022	Jack Sanborn	LB
2022	David Montgomery	RB
2021	Khalil Herbert	RB
2021	Robert Quinn	OLB
2020	Allen Robinson	WR
2020	Darnell Mooney	WR
2019	David Montgomery (2)	RB
2019	Nick Williams	DT
2018	Roquan Smith	LB
2018	Akiem Hicks	DL
2017	Tarik Cohen	RB
2017	Benny Cunningham	RB
2016	Josh Bellamy	WR/ST
2016	Jordan Howard	RB
2015	Zach Miller	TE
2015	Adrian Amos	S
2014	Matt Forte	RB
2014	Kyle Fuller	CB
2013	Josh McCown	QB
2013	Jordan Mills	OT
2012	Shea McClellin	DE
2012	Julius Peppers	DE
2012	Charles Tillman	CB
2011	Stephen Paea	DT
2011	Nick Roach	LB
2010	J'Marcus Webb	OT
2010	Anthony Adams	DT
2009	Olin Kreutz	C
2009	Johnny Knox	WR
2008	Charles Tillman (2)	CB
2008	Matt Forte (2)	RB
2007	Brian Urlacher	LB
2007	Greg Olsen	TE
2006	Olin Kreutz (2)	C
2006	Devin Hester	PR/KR
2005	John Tait	T
2005	Chris Harris	S
2004	Olin Kreutz (3)	C
2004	Tommie Harris	DT
2003	Olin Kreutz (4)	C
2003	Charles Tillman (3)	CB
2002	Phillip Daniels	DE
2002	Alex Brown	DE
2001	James Williams	T
2001	Anthony Thomas	RB
2000	Clyde Simmons	DE
2000	Brian Urlacher (2)	LB
1999	Marcus Robinson	WR
1999	Jerry Azumah	DB
1998	Bobby Engram	WR
1998	Tony Parrish	S
1997	Ryan Wetnight	TE
1997	John Allred	TE
1997	Van Hiles	S
1996	Chris Zorich	DT
1996	Bobby Engram (2)	WR
1995	Erik Kramer	QB
1995	Rashaan Salaam	RB
1994	Shaun Gayle	S
1994	Raymont Harris	RB
1993	Tom Waddle	WR
1993	Myron Baker	LB
1993	Todd Perry	T
1992	Mike Singletary	LB
1992	Troy Auzenne	T
1991	Chris Zorich (2)	DT
1990	Mark Carrier	S
1989	Trace Armstrong	DE
1988	James Thornton	TE
1988	Mickey Pruitt	LB
1987	Ron Morris	WR
1986	Neal Anderson	RB
1985	Kevin Butler	K
1984	Shaun Gayle (2)	S
1983	Jim Covert	T
1982	Jim McMahon	QB
1981	Mike Singletary (2)	LB
1980	Bob Fisher	TE
1979	Dan Hampton	DE
1978	John Skibinski	RB
1977	Ted Albrecht	T
1976	Brian Baschnagel	WR
1975	Roland Harper	RB
1974	Fred Pagac	TE
1973	Wally Chambers	DT
1972	Jim Osborne	DT
1971	Jerry Moore	S
1970	Glen Holloway	G

== Multiple-time leaders ==
Rank	Player	Times leader	Years
1	Olin Kreutz	4	2003, 2004, 2006, 2009
2	Charles Tillman	3	2003, 2008, 2012
2	T. J. Edwards	3	2023, 2024, 2025
4	Bobby Engram	2	1996, 1998
4	Brian Urlacher	2	2000, 2007
4	Chris Zorich	2	1991, 1996
4	David Montgomery	2	2019, 2022
4	Matt Forte	2	2008, 2014
4	Mike Singletary	2	1981, 1992
4	Shaun Gayle	2	1984, 1994
