= 1990 Chicago Bears season =

NFL team season

- Head coach: Mike Ditka
- Offensive coordinator: Greg Landry
- Defensive coordinator: Vince Tobin
- Home stadium: Soldier Field

Results
- Record: 11–5
- Division place: 1st NFC Central
- Playoffs: Won Wild Card Playoffs (vs. Saints) 16–6; Lost Divisional Playoffs (at Giants) 3–31

The 1990 Chicago Bears season was their 71st regular season and 20th postseason completed in the National Football League (NFL). The Bears were looking to return to the playoffs after missing them in 1989 and did so, winning their sixth NFC Central Division championship in seven seasons. With the change in playoff structuring that began in 1990, the Bears were not guaranteed a bye week for winning the division and had to play on Wild Card weekend. They defeated the New Orleans Saints 16–6 in the Wild Card round but were defeated by the eventual Super Bowl champion New York Giants at Giants Stadium 31–3 in the Divisional Playoffs. This was also the last division title the Bears would win until 2001.

For the only time in Mike Ditka's tenure as the Bears' head coach, the team played a regular season game in the state of Arizona when they visited the Phoenix Cardinals on October 28. Chicago left Tempe victorious; it was the Bears' first matchup against the Cardinals since Chicago visited the Cardinals in St. Louis six years earlier.

Late in the season, tragedy struck when defensive tackle Fred Washington, the Bears' second-round pick in the 1990 NFL draft, was killed in a car accident on December 21, 1990.

== Offseason ==
=== NFL draft ===
1990 Chicago Bears draft
Round	Pick	Player	Position	College	Notes
1	6	Mark Carrier *	Safety	USC	
2	32	Fred Washington	Defensive tackle	TCU	
2	33	Ron Cox	Linebacker	Fresno State	
3	61	Tim Ryan	Defensive end	USC	
3	63	Peter Tom Willis	Quarterback	Florida State	
4	88	Tony Moss	Wide receiver	LSU	
5	117	Pat Chaffey	Running back	Oregon State	
6	144	John Mangum	Defensive back	Alabama	
7	176	Bill Anderson	Center	Iowa	
8	200	James Rouse	Running back	Arkansas	
9	228	Johnny Bailey *	Running back	Texas A&M–Kingsville	
10	255	Terry Price	Defensive end	Texas A&M	
11	284	Brent White	Defensive end	Michigan	
11	298	Roman Matusz	Offensive tackle	Pittsburgh	
12	310	Anthony Cooney	Defensive back	Arkansas	
Made roster * Made at least one Pro Bowl during career

=== Undrafted free agents ===
1990 undrafted free agents of note
Player	Position	College
Bruce Brineman	Guard	Purdue
Steve Elmlinger	Wide receiver	Indiana State
Steve Fumi	Wide receiver	Miami (OH)
Ted Hennings	Defensive tackle	Northern Illinois
Sloan Hood	Fullback	Texas A&I
Alan Koch	Guard	Rice
James Lott	Defensive back	Clemson
Rod Manning	Linebacker	North Texas State
Ray Tarasi	Kicker	Penn State

== Staff ==
1990 Chicago Bears staff
Front office: Chairman of the board – Ed McCaskey; President/chief executive officer – Michael McCaskey; Vice-president of player personnel – Bill Tobin; Assistant director of player personnel – Rod Graves; Head coaches: Head coach – Mike Ditka; Assistant head coach/tight ends/special teams coordinator - Steve Kazor; Offensive coaches: Offensive coordinator – Greg Landry; Running backs – Johnny Roland; Wide receivers – Vic Rapp; Offensive line – Dick Stanfel	Defensive coaches: Defensive coordinator – Vince Tobin; Defensive line – John Levra; Linebackers – Dave McGinnis; Defensive backs –Zaven Yaralian

== Roster ==
1990 Chicago Bears roster
Quarterbacks (QB): 18 Mike Tomczak; 10 Peter Tom Willis; Running backs (RB): 35 Neal Anderson; 22 Johnny Bailey; 31 Mark Green KR; 25 Brad Muster FB; 30 James Rouse FB; Wide receivers (WR): 82 Wendell Davis; 29 Dennis Gentry KR; 88 Glen Kozlowski; 84 Ron Morris; 87 Tom Waddle; Tight ends (TE): 89 James Coley; 80 James Thornton	Offensive linemen (OL): 79 Kurt Becker G; 62 Mark Bortz G; 74 Jim Covert T; 67 Jerry Fontenot C; 63 Jay Hilgenberg C; 57 Tom Thayer G; 78 Keith Van Horne T; 73 John Wojciechowski T; Defensive linemen (DL): 93 Trace Armstrong DE; 95 Richard Dent DE; 99 Dan Hampton DT; 76 Steve McMichael DT; 72 William Perry DT; 65 Terry Price DE; 96 Tim Ryan DE	Linebackers (LB): 54 Ron Cox OLB; 53 Dante Jones MLB; 51 Jim Morrissey OLB; 52 Mickey Pruitt OLB; 59 Ron Rivera OLB; 55 John Roper OLB; 64 Glenell Sanders MLB; 50 Mike Singletary MLB; Defensive backs (DB): 20 Mark Carrier FS; 37 Maurice Douglass CB/S; 23 Shaun Gayle SS; 24 Vestee Jackson CB; 26 John Mangum CB; 36 Markus Paul FS; 49 David Tate SS; 21 Donnell Woolford CB; Special teams (ST): 8 Maury Buford P; 6 Kevin Butler K	Practice squad: 46 James P. Lott CB; 75 Roman Matusz T; 85 Quintin Smith WR; 12 Brent Snyder QB; Reserve: 86 Cap Boso TE (IR); 4 Jim Harbaugh QB (IR); 32 Lemuel Stinson CB (IR); 33 Lars Tate RB (IR); 47 active, 4 inactive, 4 practice squad Rookies in italics

== Regular season ==
=== Schedule ===
Week	Date	Opponent	Result	Record	Venue	Attendance
1	September 9	Seattle Seahawks	**W** 17–0	1–0	Soldier Field	64,400
2	September 16	at **Green Bay Packers**	**W** 31–13	2–0	Lambeau Field	58,938
3	September 23	**Minnesota Vikings**	**W** 19–16	3–0	Soldier Field	65,420
4	September 30	at Los Angeles Raiders	**L** 10–24	3–1	Los Angeles Memorial Coliseum	80,156
5	October 7	Green Bay Packers	**W** 27–13	4–1	Soldier Field	59,929
6	October 14	Los Angeles Rams	**W** 38–9	5–1	Soldier Field	59,383
7	Bye					
8	October 28	at Phoenix Cardinals	**W** 31–21	6–1	Sun Devil Stadium	71,233
9	November 4	at **Tampa Bay Buccaneers**	**W** 26–6	7–1	Tampa Stadium	68,555
10	November 11	Atlanta Falcons	**W** 30–24	8–1	Soldier Field	62,855
11	November 18	at Denver Broncos	**W** 16–13 (OT)	9–1	Mile High Stadium	75,013
12	November 25	at **Minnesota Vikings**	**L** 13–41	9–2	Hubert H. Humphrey Metrodome	58,866
13	December 2	Detroit Lions	**W** 23–17 (OT)	10–2	Soldier Field	62,313
14	December 9	at Washington Redskins	**L** 9–10	10–3	RFK Stadium	53,920
15	December 16	at **Detroit Lions**	**L** 21–38	10–4	Pontiac Silverdome	67,759
16	December 23	**Tampa Bay Buccaneers**	**W** 27–14	11–4	Soldier Field	46,456
17	December 29	Kansas City Chiefs	**L** 10–21	11–5	Soldier Field	60,262
Note: Intra-division opponents are in **bold** text.

=== Game summaries ===
==== Week 1: vs Seattle Seahawks ====
Week One: Seattle Seahawks at Chicago Bears – Game summary

Quarter	1	2	3	4	Total
Seahawks	0	0	0	0	**0**
**Bears**	3	7	0	7	**17**

at Soldier Field, Chicago, Illinois

- Date: September 9
- Game time: 12:00 pm local
- Game weather: hazy, 76 °F (24 °C), 67% humidity, wind S 7 miles per hour (11 km/h)
- Game attendance: 64,400
- Referee: Pat Haggerty
- TV announcers (NBC): Dick Enberg & Bill Walsh
- Gamebook

Game information

**First quarter**

- CHI – Kevin Butler 47-yard field goal, 2:40 (CHI 3–0)

**Second quarter**

- CHI – Neal Anderson 17-yard run (Kevin Butler kick), 14:23 (CHI 10–0)

**Third quarter**

- No scoring plays

**Fourth quarter**

- CHI – Neal Anderson 4-yard run (Kevin Butler kick), 8:42 (CHI 17–0)

**Top passers**

- SEA – Dave Krieg: 12/27, 91 yds, 3 INT
- CHI – Jim Harbaugh: 21/29, 203 yds, 1 INT

**Top rushers**

- SEA – John L. Williams: 8 car, 45 yds
- CHI – Neal Anderson: 20 car, 101 yds, 2 TD

**Top receivers**

- SEA – Tommy Kane: 4 rec, 46 yds
- CHI – Dennis Gentry: 5 rec, 44 yds

**Team** – pass – rush – total – to

- SEA – 74 – 58 – 132 – 3
- CHI – 195 – 171 – 366 – 1

==== Week 2: at Green Bay Packers ====
Week 2: Chicago Bears at Green Bay Packers

Quarter	1	2	3	4	Total
**Bears**	0	17	7	7	**31**
Packers	7	3	3	0	**13**

at Lambeau Field, Green Bay, Wisconsin

- Date: September 16, 1990
- Game time: 1:00 p.m. CST
- Game weather: Overcast, 54 °F (12 °C)
- TV announcers (CBS): Verne Lundquist and Dan Fouts

Game information

**First quarter**

**Second quarter**

**Third quarter**

**Fourth quarter**

Top passers

- CHI – Jim Harbaugh – 11/14, 161 yards, 2 TD, INT
- GB – Anthony Dilweg – 14/28, 149 yards, INT

Top rushers

- CHI – Neal Anderson – 21 rushes, 71 yards, TD
- GB – Keith Woodside – 7 rushes, 40 yards, TD

Top receivers

- CHI – Dennis Gentry – 1 receptions, 40 yards, TD
- GB – Clarence Weathers – 6 receptions, 62 yards

==== Week 8: at Phoenix Cardinals ====
Week 8: Chicago Bears at Phoenix Cardinals – Game summary

Quarter	1	2	3	4	Total
**Bears**	7	21	0	3	**31**
Cardinals	0	7	7	7	**21**

at Sun Devil Stadium, Tempe, Arizona

- Date: October 28
- Game time: 3:00 p.m. CST/2:00 p.m. MST
- Game weather: 80 °F (27 °C)
- Game attendance: 71,233
- Box Score

Game information

**First quarter**

- CHI – Neal Anderson 2-yard run (Kevin Butler kick). Bears 7–0.

**Second quarter**

- CHI – Jim Harbaugh 1-yard run (Kevin Butler kick). Bears 14–0.
- CHI – Ron Morris 67-yard pass from Jim Harbaugh (Kevin Butler kick). Bears 21–0.
- CHI – Neal Anderson 2-yard run (Kevin Butler kick). Bears 28–0.
- PHO – J. T. Smith 3-yard pass from Timm Rosenbach (Al Del Greco kick). Bears 28–7.

**Third quarter**

- PHO – Johnny Johnson 21-yard run (Al Del Greco kick). Bears 28–14

**Fourth quarter**

- CHI – Kevin Butler 33-yard field goal. Bears 31–14
- PHO – Roy Green 40-yard pass from Timm Rosenbach (Al Del Greco kick). Bears 31–21.

**Top passers**

- CHI – Jim Harbaugh – 9/14, 166 yards, TD, INT
- PHO – Timm Rosenbach – 18/30, 256 yards, TD

**Top rushers**

- CHI – Brad Muster – 12 rushes, 99 yards
- PHO – Johnny Johnson – 16 rushes, 74 yards, TD

**Top receivers**

- CHI – Ron Morris – 3 receptions, 93 yards, TD
- PHO – Roy Green – 5 receptions, 89 yards, TD

=== Standings ===
NFC Central
	W	L	T	PCT	DIV	CONF	PF	PA	STK
^{(3)} Chicago Bears	11	5	0	.688	6–2	9–3	348	280	L1
Tampa Bay Buccaneers	6	10	0	.375	5–3	6–8	264	367	L2
Detroit Lions	6	10	0	.375	3–5	5–7	373	413	L1
Green Bay Packers	6	10	0	.375	3–5	5–7	271	347	L5
Minnesota Vikings	6	10	0	.375	3–5	4–8	351	326	L4

== Post Season ==
In the wild card, the Bears defeated the New Orleans Saints to advance to a Divisional Round matchup against the New York Giants. The Giants ended the Bears playoff run on their way to winning the Super Bowl.

=== Wild card ===
Game summary

Quarter	1	2	3	4	Total
Saints	0	3	0	3	6
Bears	3	7	3	3	16

at Soldier Field, Chicago

- Game time: 4:00 p.m. EST/3:00 p.m. CST
- Game weather: 22 °F (−6 °C), partly cloudy
- Game attendance: 60,767
- Referee: Jerry Seeman
- TV announcers (CBS): Verne Lundquist and John Madden

Game information
- Scoring
  - CHI – field goal Butler 19 CHI 3–0
  - CHI – Thornton 18 pass from Tomczak (Butler kick) CHI 10–0
  - NO – field goal Andersen 47 CHI 10–3
  - CHI – field goal Butler 22 CHI 13–3
  - NO – field goal Andersen 38 CHI 13–6
  - CHI – field goal Butler 21 CHI 16–6

The Bears defense held the Saints to 193 total yards, 65 rushing yards, 6 first downs, and two field goals. Chicago also recorded 365 yards of total offense. Bears running back Neal Anderson compiled 102 rushing yards, 42 receiving yards, and threw a 22-yard Halfback option pass.

The score was 10–3 at the end of the first half, due to a Kevin Butler field goal and Mike Tomczak's 18-yard touchdown pass to tight end James Thornton. The Saints' only score of the half was a 47-yard field goal by Morten Andersen, who would later miss from 41 yards and have another attempt blocked. Also, with 3 minutes left before halftime, New Orleans starting quarterback Steve Walsh, who had completed just 6 of 16 passes, was knocked out of the game and replaced by John Fourcade. Fourcade fared no better, finishing the game with just 5 of 18 for 79 yards, including two interceptions.

Still the Saints were just trailing 10–3 near the end of the third quarter, and had a great chance to tie the game when defensive tackle Renaldo Turnbull blocked Butler's 45-yard field goal attempt. New Orleans defensive end Vince Buck recovered the ball and returned it 62 yards for a potential touchdown, only to see the play wiped out by an offsides penalty on teammate Robert Massey, who had lined up with his hand over the neutral zone. The penalty not only eliminated the score, but it also gave Chicago a first down, and 7 plays later, Butler kicked a 25-yard field goal to put them up 13–3.

With 5:52 left in the fourth quarter, Andersen's 38-yard field goal brought the scoring difference back to just a touchdown at 13–6. However, when faced with 3rd and 11 on the Bears ensuing drive, Tomczak completed a 38-yard pass to Dennis Gentry, enabling Chicago to maintain possession and drive to Butler's game clinching 21-yard field goal with 3:47 remaining on the clock.

You just try to line up as close as you can; I didn't realize I was offside", said Massey about his critical penalty after the game. "But when I saw the flag, I said, 'Oh, God!' I knew it was me."

This was Mike Ditka's last playoff win as Bears head coach.

=== Divisional ===
Game summary

Quarter	1	2	3	4	Total
Bears	0	3	0	0	3
Giants	10	7	7	7	31

at Giants Stadium, East Rutherford, New Jersey

- Game time: 12:30 p.m. EST
- Game weather: 32 °F (0 °C), partly cloudy
- Game attendance: 77,025
- Referee: Dick Hantak
- TV announcers (CBS): Pat Summerall and John Madden

Game information
- Scoring
  - NYG – field goal Bahr 46 NYG 3–0
  - NYG – Baker 21 pass from Hostetler (Bahr kick) NYG 10–0
  - CHI – field goal Butler 33 NYG 10–3
  - NYG – Cross 3 pass from Hostetler (Bahr kick) NYG 17–3
  - NYG – Hostetler 3 run (Bahr kick) NYG 24–3
  - NYG – Carthon 1 run (Bahr kick) NYG 31–3

The Giants defense dominated the game by allowing only 27 rushing yards and 3 points. This was the fewest rushing yards Chicago had gained in a game since 1967. Their previous low for the season was 100. Bears running back Neal Anderson, who had rushed for over 1,000 yards in the season and 102 yards in the previous playoff game, was held to 19 yards on 12 carries. Giants quarterback Jeff Hostetler, playing because starter Phil Simms suffered a season-ending injury, completed 10 out of 17 passes for 122 yards and two touchdowns, while also rushing for 43 yards and another score.

On Chicago's second possession of the game, Giants defensive back Mark Collins intercepted Mike Tomczak's pass after it bounced out of the hands of Dennis Gentry and returned it 11 yards to set up a 46-yard field goal by Matt Bahr. The Bears took the ensuing kickoff and drove to the Giants 27, but on 4th down and 12, coach Mike Ditka decided against attempting a field goal in the 13 mph (21 km/h) winds. On Chicago's conversion attempt, Anderson caught a pass from Tomczak, but was stuffed after a short gain. The Giants then drove 75 yards, including a 6-yard fourth-down conversion catch by reserve tight end Bob Mrosko, to go up 10–0 on Hostetler's 21-yard completion to Stephen Baker.

In the second quarter, Hostetler lost a fumble while being sacked by Steve McMichael, and Bears lineman Dan Hampton recovered the ball. Chicago then drove to the Giants 1-yard line. But on a 4th down conversion attempt, Giants defensive end John Washington plowed through Jim Covert's block attempt and tackled fullback Brad Muster for a loss. Still, the Bears managed to force a three-and-out, and convert good starting field position into a 33-yard field goal by Kevin Butler. But before the end of the half, the Giants went up 17–3 with an 80-yard, 11-play scoring drive. On the first play, Hostetler scrambled away from a Bears blitz and rushed for 11 yards. Later on, he converted a 4th and 1 at the Bears 32 with a 10-yard burst, and eventually he finished the drive with a 5-yard touchdown pass to tight end Howard Cross.

In the third quarter, Hostelter converted his third 4th down of the day with 9-yard scramble on 4th and 6, and finished the drive with a 3-yard touchdown run, putting his team up 24–3. Chicago responded with a drive to the Giants 5-yard line. On 4th and goal, Muster caught a pass at the 1, but was dropped by linebackers Pepper Johnson and Gary Reasons before he could get across the goal line. In the fourth quarter, Giants defensive back Everson Walls returned an interception 37 yards to the Giants 49. The Giants then went on a 51-yard drive consisting of 16 running plays, the last a 1-yard touchdown plunge by fullback Maurice Carthon, that ate up 10:30 of play time.

This game offered a preview of what lay in store for Super Bowl XXV, as the Giants scored on drives of 75, 80, 49 and 51 yards, which lasted nine, 11, 11 and 16 plays. Overall, the Giants held the ball for 38:22, compared to Chicago's 21:38. The only negative thing for New York was the loss of running back Rodney Hampton, who suffered a broken leg in the first half.
