= James Coley =

James Coley may refer to:

- James Coley (American football coach) (born 1973)
- James Coley (tight end) (born 1967), American football tight end
- Jim Coley (1951–2021), American politician, member of the Tennessee House of Representatives
