= Peanut punch =

Peanut punch may refer to:

- Peanut punch (drink), a beverage popular in the Caribbean
- Peanut punch (football), a gridiron football move to force a fumble
