= List of NFL annual forced fumbles leaders =

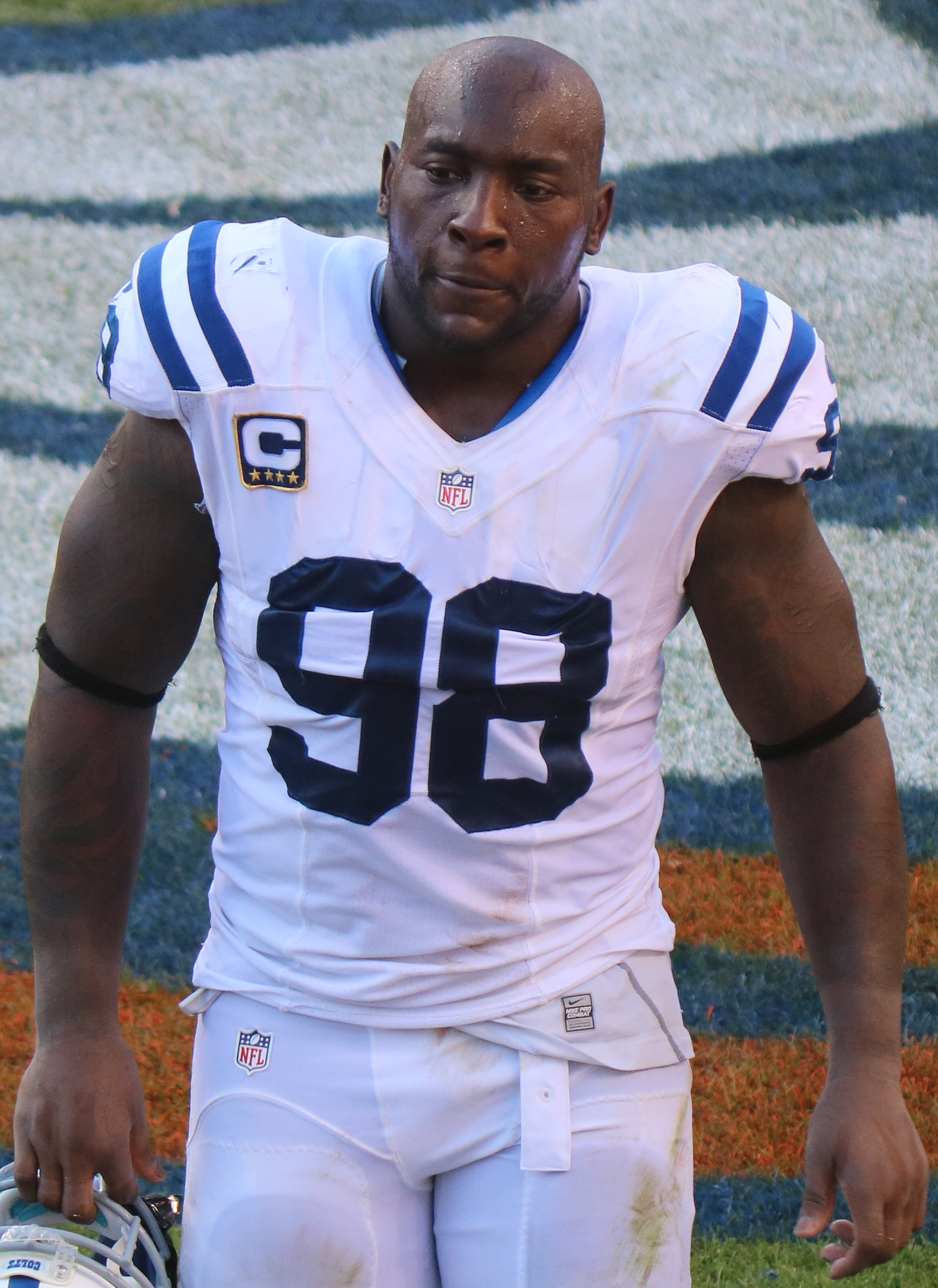
Robert Mathis led the league three times throughout his career and is the all-time leader in forced fumbles, with 52.

In American football, a forced fumble is when a defensive player causes the ball carrier to lose possession of the ball. The defender will typically either rip or punch the ball out to cause the ball carrier to fumble. This is a list of National Football League (NFL) players who have led the regular season in forced fumbles each year. Forced fumbles aren’t an official stat recorded by the NFL. Pro Football Reference has data on forced fumbles back to 1977, but the data before 1999 is incomplete. Greg Lloyd and Robert Mathis currently hold the record for most seasons leading the league in forced fumbles with 3. Osi Umenyiora and Charles Tillman currently hold the record for most forced fumbles in a season with 10.

== NFL annual forced fumble leaders ==
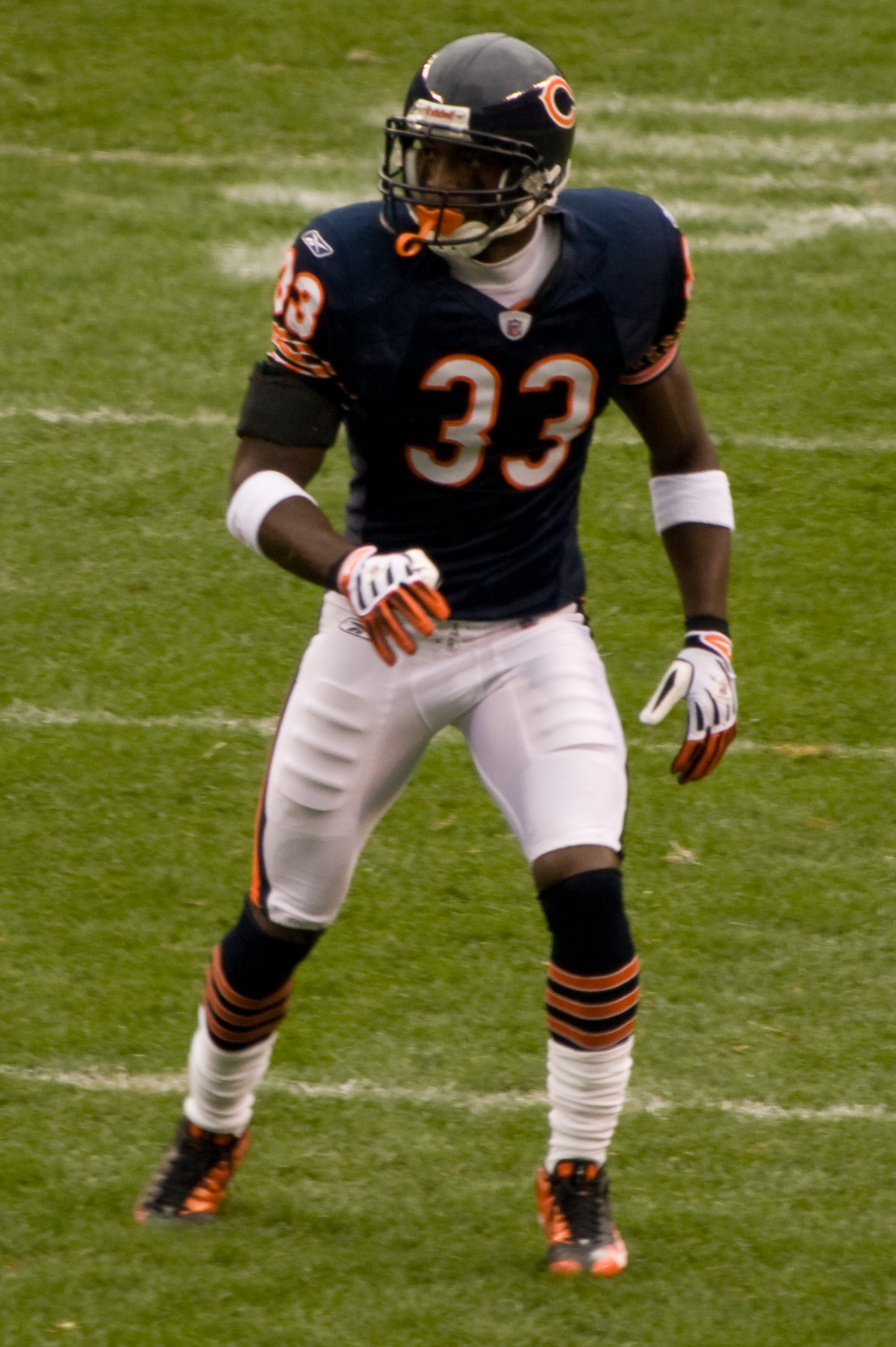
Charles "Peanut" Tillman, who led the league in 2012, was known for his ability to force fumbles with a well-timed punch commonly known as the "Peanut Punch".

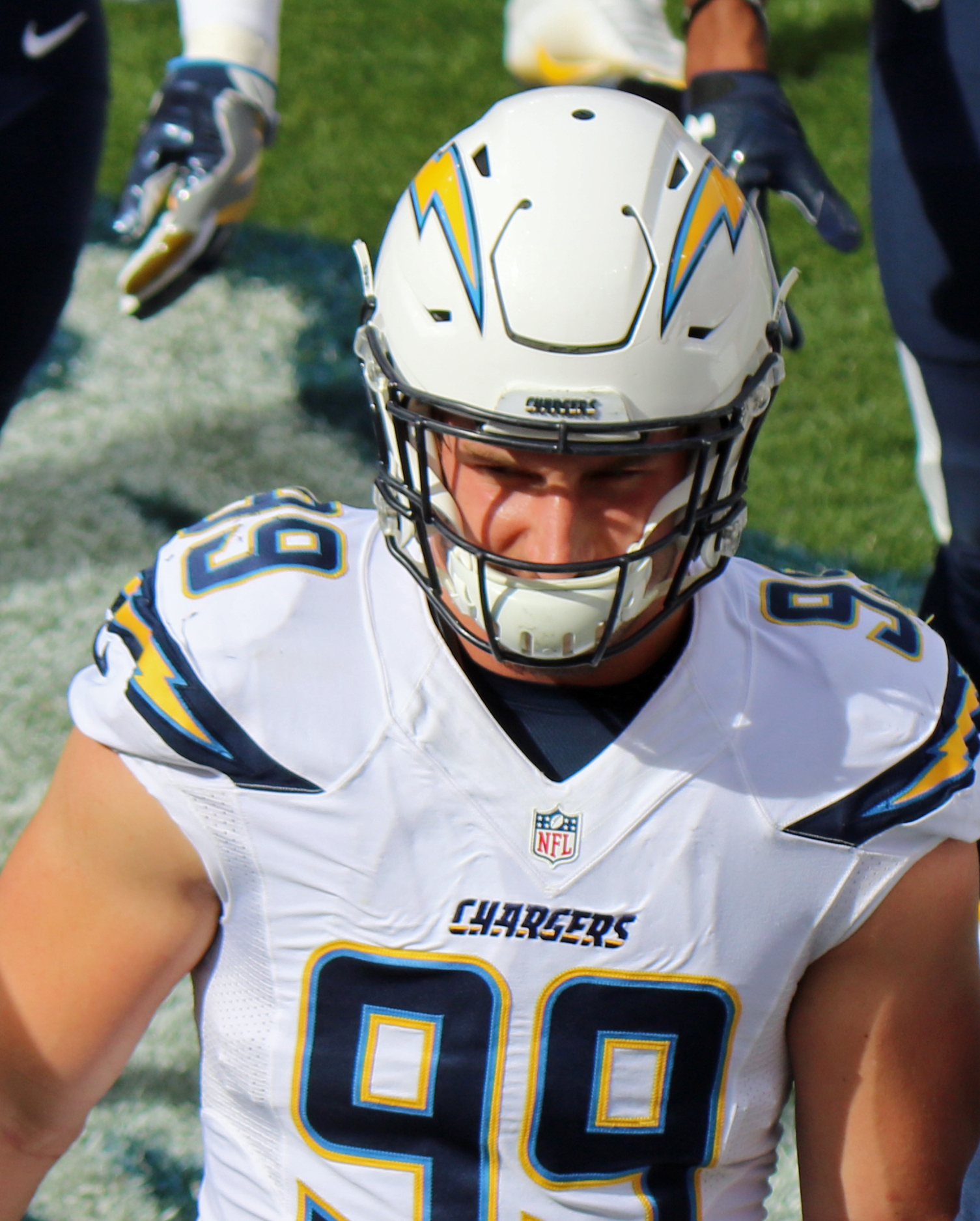
Joey Bosa is the most recent forced fumbles leader having led the league with 5 forced fumbles in the 2025 season.

Key
Symbol	Meaning
Leader	The player who recorded the most forced fumbles in the NFL
FF	The total number of forced fumbles the player had
GP	The number of games played by a player during the season
†	Pro Football Hall of Fame member
^	The player is an active player
*	Player set the single-season record for forced fumbles
(#)	Denotes the number of times a player appears in this list

Note that the forced fumble totals from 1977 to 1998 are incomplete.

NFL annual forced fumbles leaders by season
Season	Leader	FF	GP	Team	Refs
1977	Mike Butler	5*	14	Green Bay Packers	
1977	Harry Carson†	5*	14	New York Giants	
1977	Chuck Crist	5*	14	New Orleans Saints	
1977	Tim Gray	5*	10	Kansas City Chiefs	
1977	John Mendenhall	5*	14	New York Giants	
1977	Lee Roy Selmon†	5*	14	Tampa Bay Buccaneers	
1978	Steve Nelson	7*	14	New England Patriots	
1979	Kurt Allerman	6	16	St. Louis Cardinals	
1979	Wally Chambers	6	16	Tampa Bay Buccaneers	
1979	Dirt Winston	6	16	Pittsburgh Steelers	
1980	Ted Hendricks†	6	16	Oakland Raiders	
1981	Mike Douglass	9*	16	Green Bay Packers	
1982	Greg Brown	6	9	Philadelphia Eagles	
1983	Dave Brown	6	16	Seattle Seahawks	
1984	Randy White†	7	16	Dallas Cowboys	
1985	Jacob Green	8	16	Seattle Seahawks	
1985	Linden King	8	16	San Diego Chargers	
1986	Rickey Jackson†	6	16	New Orleans Saints	
1986	Johnny Rembert	6	16	New England Patriots	
1987	Chris Doleman†	6	12	Minnesota Vikings	
1988	Johnny Meads	6	16	Houston Oilers	
1989	Dennis Smith	7	14	Denver Broncos	
1989	Greg Townsend	7	16	Los Angeles Raiders	
1990	Mark Carrier	5	16	Chicago Bears	
1990	Kevin Greene†	5	15	Los Angeles Rams	
1990	Charles Haley†	5	16	San Francisco 49ers	
1990	Harry Hamilton	5	16	Tampa Bay Buccaneers	
1990	Johnny Meads (2)	5	16	Houston Oilers	
1990	Vince Newsome	5	16	Los Angeles Rams	
1990	Bruce Smith†	5	16	Buffalo Bills	
1991	Greg Lloyd	7	16	Pittsburgh Steelers	
1992	Derrick Thomas†	8	16	Kansas City Chiefs	
1993	Lonnie Marts	6	16	Kansas City Chiefs	
1994	Greg Lloyd (2)	6	15	Pittsburgh Steelers	
1994	Neil Smith	6	14	Kansas City Chiefs	
1995	Ken Harvey	6	16	Washington Redskins	
1995	Greg Lloyd (3)	6	16	Pittsburgh Steelers	
1995	Ed McDaniel	6	16	Minnesota Vikings	
1995	Anthony Pleasant	6	16	Cleveland Browns	
1996	Roy Barker	8	16	San Francisco 49ers	
1997	Tony Brackens	6	15	Jacksonville Jaguars	
1998	Michael Sinclair	6	16	Seattle Seahawks	
1999	Tony Brackens (2)	8	16	Jacksonville Jaguars	
2000	Trace Armstrong	7	16	Miami Dolphins	
2001	John Abraham	6	16	New York Jets	
2001	Michael Strahan†	6	16	New York Giants	
2002	Dwight Freeney†	9	16	Indianapolis Colts	
2002	Leonard Little	9	16	St. Louis Rams	
2003	LaVar Arrington	6	12	Washington Redskins	
2003	Leonard Little (2)	6	16	St. Louis Rams	
2003	Simeon Rice	6	16	Tampa Bay Buccaneers	
2003	Terrell Suggs	6	16	Baltimore Ravens	
2004	Robert Mathis	6	16	Indianapolis Colts	
2004	Will Smith	6	16	New Orleans Saints	
2005	Robert Mathis (2)	8	13	Indianapolis Colts	
2006	Jason Taylor†	9	16	Miami Dolphins	
2007	Chris Harris	8	15	Carolina Panthers	
2008	James Harrison	7	15	Pittsburgh Steelers	
2009	Shaun Phillips	7	16	San Diego Chargers	
2010	Osi Umenyiora	10*	16	New York Giants	
2011	Terrell Suggs (2)	7	16	Baltimore Ravens	
2012	Charles Tillman	10	16	Chicago Bears	
2013	Robert Mathis (3)	8	16	Indianapolis Colts	
2014	Ryan Kerrigan	5	16	Washington Redskins	
2014	Robert Quinn	5	16	St. Louis Rams	
2015	Jamie Collins	5	12	New England Patriots	
2016	Vic Beasley	6	16	Atlanta Falcons	
2016	Bruce Irvin	6	16	Oakland Raiders	
2017	Yannick Ngakoue	6	16	Jacksonville Jaguars	
2018	Dee Ford	7	16	Kansas City Chiefs	
2018	J. J. Watt	7	16	Houston Texans	
2019	Chandler Jones	8	16	Arizona Cardinals	
2019	T. J. Watt^	8	16	Pittsburgh Steelers	
2020	Marlon Humphrey^	8	15	Baltimore Ravens	
2021	Shaquille Leonard	8	17	Indianapolis Colts	
2022	Alex Highsmith^	5	17	Pittsburgh Steelers	
2022	Haason Reddick	5	17	Philadelphia Eagles	
2023	Bradley Chubb^	6	16	Miami Dolphins	
2023	Antoine Winfield Jr^	6	17	Tampa Bay Buccaneers	
2024	T. J. Watt^ (2)	6	17	Pittsburgh Steelers	
2025	Joey Bosa	5	15	Buffalo Bills	

== Most seasons leading the league ==
Count	Player	Seasons	Team	Refs
3	Greg Lloyd	1991, 1994, 1995	Pittsburgh Steelers	
3	Robert Mathis	2004, 2005, 2013	Indianapolis Colts	
2	Tony Brackens	1997, 1999	Jacksonville Jaguars	
2	Leonard Little	2002, 2003	St. Louis Rams	
2	Johnny Meads	1988, 1990	Houston Oilers	
2	Terrell Suggs	2003, 2011	Baltimore Ravens	
2	T. J. Watt	2019, 2024	Pittsburgh Steelers	

== See also ==
- List of NFL annual sacks leaders
- List of NFL annual interceptions leaders
- List of NFL individual records
