= Louis Age =

American football player (born 1970)

No. 79, 57
- Position: Offensive tackle

Personal information
- Born: February 1, 1970 (age 56); New Orleans, Louisiana, U.S.
- Listed height: 6 ft 7 in (2.01 m)
- Listed weight: 350 lb (159 kg)

Career information
- High school: St. Augustine (New Orleans)
- College: Louisiana
- NFL draft: 1992: 11th round, 304th overall pick

Career history
- Chicago Bears (1992); Atlanta Falcons (1994)*; Washington Redskins (1995)*; Barcelona Dragons (1995-1996); New Orleans Saints (1997)*
- * Offseason or practice squad member only

Career NFL statistics
- Games played: 6
- Stats at Pro Football Reference

Louis Theodore Age, III (born February 1, 1970) is an American former professional football player who was an offensive tackle for the Chicago Bears of the National Football League (NFL) in 1992. He played college football for the Louisiana Ragin' Cajuns and was selected by the Bears in the 11th round of the 1992 NFL draft with the 304th overall pick.
