= List of Louisiana Ragin' Cajuns in the NFL draft =

This is a list of Louisiana Ragin' Cajuns football players in the NFL draft.

== Key ==
| B | Back | K | Kicker | NT | Nose tackle |
| C | Center | LB | Linebacker | FB | Fullback |
| DB | Defensive back | P | Punter | HB | Halfback |
| DE | Defensive end | QB | Quarterback | WR | Wide receiver |
| DT | Defensive tackle | RB | Running back | G | Guard |
| E | End | T | Offensive tackle | TE | Tight end |

== Selections ==
| Year | Round | Overall | Player | Team | Position |
|---|---|---|---|---|---|
| 1989 | 3 | 73 | Chris Gannon | New England Patriots | DE |
| 1989 | 7 | 169 | Mark Hall | Green Bay Packers | DE |
| 1990 | 5 | 130 | Brian Mitchell | Washington Redskins | RB |
| 1991 | 6 | 163 | Todd Scott | Minnesota Vikings | DB |
| 1995 | 2 | 42 | Orlando Thomas | Minnesota Vikings | DB |
| 1996 | 6 | 179 | Keno Hills | New Orleans Saints | T |
| 1998 | 2 | 36 | Anthony Clement | Arizona Cardinals | T |
| 1999 | 4 | 105 | Brandon Stokley | Baltimore Ravens | WR |
| 2002 | 7 | 258 | Brad Franklin | Carolina Panthers | DB |
| 2003 | 2 | 35 | Charles Tillman | Chicago Bears | DB |
| 2003 | 4 | 125 | Ike Taylor | Pittsburgh Steelers | DB |
| 2005 | 6 | 188 | C. C. Brown | Houston Texans | DB |
| 2010 | 5 | 149 | Hall Davis | St. Louis Rams | DE |
| 2012 | 3 | 85 | Bill Bentley | Detroit Lions | DB |
| 2012 | 4 | 110 | Ladarius Green | San Diego Chargers | TE |
| 2015 | 6 | 210 | Christian Ringo | Green Bay Packers | DE |
| 2017 | 6 | 188 | Elijah McGuire | New York Jets | RB |
| 2018 | 3 | 82 | Tracy Walker | Detroit Lions | DB |
| 2018 | 6 | 188 | Simeon Thomas | Cleveland Browns | DB |
| 2020 | 2 | 39 | Robert Hunt | Miami Dolphins | G |
| 2020 | 4 | 135 | Kevin Dotson | Pittsburgh Steelers | G |
| 2020 | 7 | 245 | Raymond Calais | Tampa Bay Buccaneers | RB |
| 2021 | 6 | 194 | Elijah Mitchell | San Francisco 49ers | RB |
| 2022 | 4 | 111 | Max Mitchell | New York Jets | OT |
| 2022 | 4 | 113 | Percy Butler | Washington Commanders | DB |
| 2023 | 7 | 233 | Andre Jones Jr. | Washington Commanders | DE |
| 2024 | 7 | 233 | Nate Thomas | Dallas Cowboys | OT |
| 2026 | 5 | 154 | Jaden Dugger | San Francisco 49ers | LB |
