= Wendell Davis (wide receiver) =

American football player (born 1966)

No. 82
- Position: Wide receiver

Personal information
- Born: January 3, 1966 (age 60); Shreveport, Louisiana, U.S.
- Listed height: 5 ft 11 in (1.80 m)
- Listed weight: 188 lb (85 kg)

Career information
- High school: Fair Park (Shreveport)
- College: LSU
- NFL draft: 1988: 1st round, 27th overall pick

Career history
- Chicago Bears (1988–1993); Indianapolis Colts (1995)

Awards and highlights
- Consensus All-American (1987); First-team All-American (1986); SEC Player of the Year (1987); First-team All-SEC (1986, 1987)

Career NFL statistics
- Receptions: 207
- Receiving yards: 3,000
- Receiving touchdowns: 14
- Stats at Pro Football Reference

Wendell Tyrone Davis (born January 3, 1966) is an American former professional football player who was a wide receiver for six seasons with the Chicago Bears of the National Football League (NFL) from 1988 to 1993. He was selected by the Bears in the first round (27th overall) in the 1988 NFL draft. Davis was a consensus All-American playing college football for the LSU Tigers.

In his pro career, Davis played in 81 games, catching 207 receptions for 3,000 yards and 14 touchdowns.

His career effectively ended on October 10, 1993, in a game against the Philadelphia Eagles. While planting his feet to catch an underthrown deep ball from QB Jim Harbaugh, his cleats got stuck in the Astroturf at Veterans Stadium. The force of being pulled back to the ground was so severe that it completely severed the patella tendon in each of his knees. Doctors later found his kneecaps had been pushed all the way into his thighs. He spent several months in a wheelchair, with his legs encased in casts from thigh to ankle. After spending the entire 1994 season in rehab, he attempted a comeback with the Indianapolis Colts in 1995, but did not appear in a game.

In October 2009, Davis became the wide receivers coach for the San Francisco 49ers under Mike Singletary. Following the arrival of new head coach Jim Harbaugh in 2011, Davis and the rest of the San Francisco coaching staff were replaced. Davis then coached at Palo Alto High School in the 2011 season, and in 2012 was hired as the wide receivers coach for Columbia University.

== NFL career statistics ==
Legend
**Bold**	Career high

=== Regular season ===
Year	Team	Games		Receiving				
Year	Team	GP	GS	Rec	Yds	Avg	Lng	TD
1988	CHI	**16**	0	15	220	14.7	36	0
1989	CHI	14	7	26	397	15.3	52	3
1990	CHI	14	12	39	572	14.7	51	3
1991	CHI	**16**	**16**	**61**	**945**	**15.5**	**75**	**6**
1992	CHI	**16**	15	54	734	13.6	40	2
1993	CHI	5	4	12	132	11.0	17	0
Career		81	54	207	3,000	14.5	75	14

=== Playoffs ===
Year	Team	Games		Receiving				
Year	Team	GP	GS	Rec	Yds	Avg	Lng	TD
1988	CHI	**2**	0	1	11	11.0	11	0
1990	CHI	**2**	**2**	4	**89**	**22.3**	**37**	0
1991	CHI	1	1	**7**	79	11.3	17	0
Career		5	3	12	179	14.9	37	0
