= Brad Muster =

American football player (born 1965)

No. 25, 22
- Position: Fullback

Personal information
- Born: April 11, 1965 (age 61); San Martin, California, U.S.
- Listed height: 6 ft 3 in (1.91 m)
- Listed weight: 235 lb (107 kg)

Career information
- High school: Novato (CA) San Marin
- College: Stanford
- NFL draft: 1988: 1st round, 23rd overall pick

Career history
- Chicago Bears (1988–1992); New Orleans Saints (1993–1994)

Awards and highlights
- Consensus All-American (1986); Pac-10 Offensive Player of the Year (1986); 2× First-team All-Pac-10 (1985, 1986); 2× Second-team All-Pac-10 (1984, 1987)

Career NFL statistics
- Rushing yards: 2,231
- Rushing average: 4.3
- Receptions: 202
- Receiving yards: 1,906
- Total touchdowns: 31
- Stats at Pro Football Reference

Bradley William Muster (born April 11, 1965) is an American former professional football player who was a fullback in the National Football League (NFL). He played college football for the Stanford Cardinal. He was selected in the first round (23rd overall) of the 1988 NFL draft by the Chicago Bears.

== College career ==
Muster attended San Marin High School in Novato, California, graduating in 1983. He later attended Stanford University. In the 1984 Big Game, Muster ran the ball for 204 yards on 34 carries. He had 78 receptions in the 1985 season, which is tied for third place in the Pacific-10 Conference. Muster graduated from Stanford in 1988 and was selected by the Chicago Bears in the first round of the 1988 NFL draft.

== Professional career ==
He was used as a fullback, and his goal when he didn't have the ball was to help block for Neal Anderson. After the 1992 season, coach Dave Wannstedt would not let Muster be a featured back, so he signed a free agent contract with the Saints. The man he replaced, Craig Heyward, ended up playing with the Bears. Muster retired after the 1994 season due to nagging injuries.

== NFL career statistics ==
Legend
**Bold**	Career high

=== Regular season ===
Year	Team	Games		Rushing					Receiving				
Year	Team	GP	GS	Att	Yds	Avg	Lng	TD	Rec	Yds	Avg	Lng	TD
1988	CHI	**16**	0	44	197	4.5	15	0	21	236	11.2	40	1
1989	CHI	**16**	**16**	82	327	4.0	20	5	32	259	8.1	25	**3**
1990	CHI	**16**	15	**141**	**664**	**4.7**	28	**6**	**47**	**452**	9.6	**48**	0
1991	CHI	11	11	90	412	4.6	24	**6**	35	287	8.2	21	1
1992	CHI	**16**	**16**	98	414	4.2	**35**	3	34	389	**11.4**	44	2
1993	NOR	13	11	64	214	3.3	18	3	23	195	8.5	31	0
1994	NOR	7	1	1	3	3.0	3	1	10	88	8.8	21	0
		95	70	520	2,231	4.3	35	24	202	1,906	9.4	48	7

=== Playoffs ===
Year	Team	Games		Rushing					Receiving				
Year	Team	GP	GS	Att	Yds	Avg	Lng	TD	Rec	Yds	Avg	Lng	TD
1988	CHI	**2**	0	7	14	2.0	6	0	1	9	**9.0**	9	0
1990	CHI	**2**	**2**	**16**	**79**	4.9	**28**	0	**5**	**42**	8.4	**20**	0
1991	CHI	1	1	5	25	**5.0**	9	0	0	0	0.0	0	0
		5	3	28	118	4.2	28	0	6	51	8.5	20	0

== Personal life ==
Muster lives in Sonoma County with his wife, son, and daughter. He is an assistant coach for the men's golf team at Santa Rosa Junior College in Santa Rosa, California.
