= Peanut punch (football) =

Gridiron football move to force a fumble

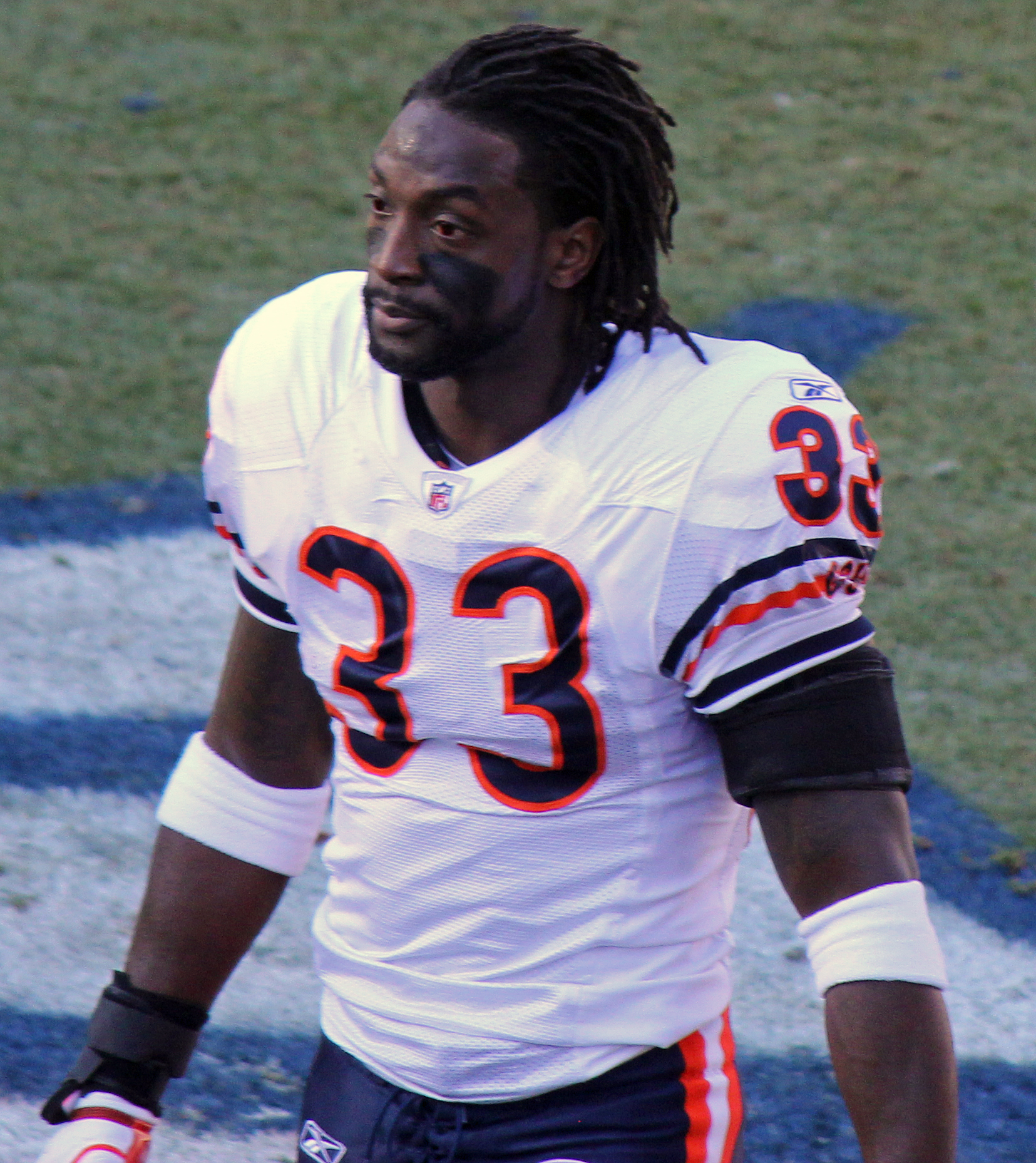
Charles Tillman, the namesake and originator of the Peanut Punch

The "Peanut punch" is a gridiron football move in which a player forces a fumble by punching the ball out of the carrier's possession. The practice was popularized by former National Football League cornerback Charles Tillman, who is nicknamed "Peanut" and forced the most fumbles as a defensive back in NFL history.

The effectiveness of the punch has made it a critical component of a defender's play style. The NFL acknowledged it as a football concept in 2022.

== Charles "Peanut" Tillman ==
Tillman played 13 seasons in the NFL for the Chicago Bears (2003–2014) and Carolina Panthers (2015). His nickname "Peanut", bestowed by his aunt Renee, who remarked he resembled a peanut when he was born, stayed with him during his career. Tillman is unsure as to where the term "Peanut Punch" came from, and has joked he should have trademarked it for exclusive use.

When Tillman attended Copperas Cove High School, his defensive coordinator Rodney Southern taught him to use his longer arms to reach for the ball while tackling. In college, where Tillman played for the University of Louisiana, Southern noticed he had a disproportionate amount of tackles; he suggested Tillman "could have forced a lot of balls out if you could just punch it", which he took into consideration. His coaches at Louisiana also urged him to "go after the ball" when making a tackle. To do so, he intentionally targeted ball carriers from poor angles—such as from behind—that ensured he could have a better chance at punching the ball out.

Although he initially believed the move would not work in the NFL due to players being faster, Tillman successfully executed it in his debut on a punt return when he punched the ball from returner Jimmy Williams, which Bears long snapper Patrick Mannelly recovered. He recalled Williams carried the ball "like a loaf of bread and I just punched it out. Then I said 'Oh yeah, I can do that in this league,' and I just started punching them." Tillman lacked the size and physicality to tackle like linebackers, so he used his smaller size and range to reach for the ball. His successes with the punch could also be attributed to the Bears consistently having among the best defense in the league, which meant they could tackle a ball carrier before Tillman arrived or help him if he failed on a punch.

Over his career, he would become one of the league's most prolific players in forcing fumbles. According to Tillman, his favorite punch was in 2007 against the Detroit Lions: with the Bears trailing 16–7 late, Tillman dislodged the ball from Kevin Jones's grip and linebacker Hunter Hillenmeyer recovered it. Some of his Bears teammates also adopted the Peanut Punch with success, like safety Chris Harris, who learned the punch while playing alongside Tillman for two seasons then led the league in forced fumbles in 2007 with the Carolina Panthers. In 2012, Tillman set the record for most fumbles forced in a game with four, all using the Peanut Punch. He ended the 2012 season with ten fumbles forced, tied for the league record.

When he retired from the NFL in 2016, Tillman had 44 forced fumbles, the sixth highest in league history and the most by a cornerback. He is the only defensive back in the top ten, the rest being pass rushers. 24 of his 42 forced fumbles with the Bears were recovered by his team, with Tillman doing so himself on three occasions.

While Tillman is regarded as an unlikely candidate for the Pro Football Hall of Fame due to his limited accolades (he only made the Pro Bowl twice and was named All-Pro once), his impact on the sport with the Peanut Punch is a common argument by supporters for why he should be inducted. Historian Jack Silverstein surmised his lack of awards was because forced fumbles were not seen as a vital part of a defensive back's talent during Tillman's career. Silverstein also compared the punch's contribution to defensive play to moves like Lawrence Taylor's pass rush as a linebacker or Deacon Jones' head slap, while Alex Shapiro of NBC Sports Chicago equated it to the Hail Mary pass or icing the kicker in prominence within football terminology. Wide receiver Greg Jennings, who played against Tillman, also implied he was the "most influential DB this century" for creating the punch.

== Execution ==
Matt Bowen, a former safety, broke down the Peanut Punch into three steps: setup, punch, and recovery. The defender faces the ball carrier in the open field with a balanced stance, ensuring the latter cannot avoid the incoming tackle. Upon colliding, the defender extends his fist toward the exposed football which Bowen compared to a boxer directly aiming for the ribs. If successful, the ball is disloged from the carrier's reach. According to Minnesota Vikings safety Harrison Smith, the ideal target for the punch is at the inside of the elbow since that is where the carrier's grip on the ball is the weakest; Vikings linebacker Andrew Van Ginkel also suggested moments where the carrier is most exposed such as spinning or attempting a stiff-arm fend, when the ball is physically further from the player's body.

Bowen stressed a failed punch should still end in an easy tackle for the defender. However, strictly attempting to go for the fumble can result in a missed tackle in open space, leading to more yards gained by the offense. For this reason, players are discouraged from using it indiscriminately, especially if the ball carrier is known for breaking tackles. Defensive coordinators who practice zone defenses typically encourage the punch more than those reliant on man-to-man defense as zone assignments have more players covering certain sections of the field. Another common technique is to have one defender wrap up the ball carrier until a teammate arrives to punch it out.

In response to the punch, running back Aaron Jones noted ball carriers "have to be more cautious" when approached by a defender. If in an "awkward situation" where the punch might happen, the carrier should try to reinforce his grip on the ball either by holding it with both hands or bring it closer to his body. Bears writer Dan Pompei remarked "offensive coaches spend more time on ball security drills now, at all levels of the game, than ever before" to prepare for the move.

== Popularization ==
In the decade following Tillman's retirement, the rate of forced fumbles increased as other players began employing the Peanut Punch. Cornerbacks were especially responsible for the uptick in what Silverstein called a "cornerback forced fumble revolution", with seven cornerbacks finishing top five in fumbles forced from 2020 to 2022 whereas the ten-year stretch between 1999 and 2009 had just ten combined. Marlon Humphrey, who led the league in the category in 2020 with eight, said the punch was a tactic he "[took] to heart" and a "thing that I think a lot of corners are all adding to their game."

Through the late 2010s and 2020s, coaches encouraged their defenses to punch at the ball when they could. Smith recalled he had to disregard traditional tackling methods to train himself to punch at the ball, calling it "a minus" if a defender cannot do so. Former Seattle Seahawks coach Pete Carroll speculated defenders were hesitant at first because they prioritized making the tackle, though he promoted its usage by having his players watch game footage from Tillman's career. Ron Rivera, who was Tillman's defensive coordinator in Chicago and head coach in Carolina, had his players target the ball carrier's pressure points where his arm is gripping the ball and punch at the exposed locations. Former Lions coach Matt Patricia's defense practiced a variation called "CPR"—"club, punch, rip"—in which a defender identified how the carrier was holding the ball, punched at it, or tried to yank it out. Ahead of the 2024–25 NFL playoffs, Philadelphia Eagles head coach Nick Sirianni emphasized the tactic by requiring his defense and staff to review Tillman's film; the Eagles successfully executed three Peanut Punches in the postseason and went on to win Super Bowl LIX.

The term "Peanut Punch" would become common vernacular to describe a fumble caused by the fist. Players like Byron Maxwell and T. J. Watt have also directly attributed their successes with the punch to learning from Tillman or his coaches.

In the closing stretch of the 2022 NFL season, the league sent a training video to all general managers and head coaches that properly defined the Peanut Punch as a football concept and move. NFL officials also provided guidance on timing the move so that it is not interpreted as punching an opponent after the play. Another memo was released by the NFL in 2025 cautioning defenders to ensure they are punching at the ball and not opposing players.

The 2015 video game Madden NFL 16 had a trophy called "Peanut Punch" for a successful forced fumble.

== See also ==
- List of NFL annual forced fumbles leaders
