= James O. Williams =

American football player (born 1968)

James Williams
No. 71
- Position: Offensive tackle

Personal information
- Born: March 29, 1968 (age 58); Pittsburgh, Pennsylvania, U.S.
- Listed height: 6 ft 7 in (2.01 m)
- Listed weight: 332 lb (151 kg)

Career information
- High school: Taylor Allderdice (Pittsburgh)
- College: Cheyney
- NFL draft: 1991: undrafted

Career history
- Chicago Bears (1991–2002); New England Patriots (2004)*
- * Offseason or practice squad member only

Awards and highlights
- Second-team All-Pro (2001); Pro Bowl (2001); 100 greatest Bears of All-Time

Career NFL statistics
- Games played: 166
- Games started: 143
- Fumble recoveries: 3
- Stats at Pro Football Reference

James Otis "Big Cat" Williams (born March 29, 1968) is an American former professional football player who was a tackle in the National Football League (NFL), playing his entire 12-year career with the Chicago Bears. Williams was 6'7" and 330-pounds. He has two children, Jai and Jia.

Williams was signed as a free agent by Bill Tobin after the 1991 draft. He played defensive tackle on a 0–11 team at Cheyney State. Williams worked his way into the defensive line rotation his rookie season, substituting for Steve McMichael and William Perry when needed. As a rookie, he blocked a field goal at Buffalo, picked up his first sack at Green Bay, and helped with the "push" on William Perry's game-saving field goal block against the New York Giants.

Williams played sparingly on defense in 1992 and was inactive for five straight games. The second-year tackle did not make the starting lineup following the drafting of 1991 second-rounder Chris Zorich. He was moved to offensive tackle midway through November, then to right tackle. Soon after, Williams relieved Keith Van Horne against Tampa in September, then was inactive for the final 12 games of the 1993 season.

From 1994 through his final game with the Bears in 2002, Williams started 134 games at right tackle. He missed limited action throughout those seasons and played every snap in 1995. In addition to his starting duties, Williams blocked or deflected eight field goal attempts through 2001. He was chosen as a Pro Bowl alternate after the 1998 season and voted to his first All-Pro game following the 2001 season, during which the Bears finished 13–3. Williams was the last active player on the Bears that remained from Mike Ditka's tenure as head coach.

Williams was a team ambassador throughout his career, and was the veteran recipient of the Bears' Brian Piccolo Award following the 2001 season. He appeared in an E-TV Wild on Chicago episode prior to the 2001 season.

Williams was released by Chicago on February 26, 2003.

Williams lives in Lake Forest, Illinois and in 2019 became an offensive lineman coach at Lake Forest High School.
