= Troy Auzenne =

American football player (born 1969)

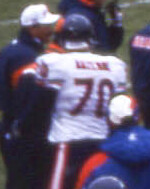
- Auzene with the Bears in 1995

No. 70, 75
- Position: Offensive tackle

Personal information
- Born: June 26, 1969 (age 57); El Monte, California, U.S.
- Listed height: 6 ft 8 in (2.03 m)
- Listed weight: 315 lb (143 kg)

Career information
- High school: Bishop Amat Memorial (La Puente, California)
- College: California
- NFL draft: 1992: 2nd round, 49th overall pick

Career history
- Chicago Bears (1992–1995); Indianapolis Colts (1996)

Awards and highlights
- PFWA All-Rookie Team (1992); First-team All-American (1991); First-team All-Pac-10 (1991); Second-team All-Pac-10 (1990)

Career NFL statistics
- Games played: 61
- Games started: 35
- Fumble recoveries: 1
- Stats at Pro Football Reference

Troy Anthony Auzenne (born June 26, 1969) is an American former professional football player who was an offensive tackle for five seasons in the National Football League (NFL). He played college football for the California Golden Bears. Auzenne played in the NFL for the Chicago Bears (1992–1995) and the Indianapolis Colts (1996).

== Early Education ==
Auzenne attended St. John the Baptist Catholic School, in Baldwin Park, California for his Elementary and Middle school education.

== High school ==
Auzenne attended Bishop Amat High School in La Puente, California, and was a letterman in football and track. He was a first-team All League selection in 1986. He graduated in 1987.

== College ==
After redshirting his first year at the University of California, Berkeley, Auzenne became a starting left tackle as a freshman, and held that position for four years. By his senior year he became a consensus 1st team All-Pac-10 selection and a 1st team All American. After retirement from the NFL, Auzenne was enshrined in the Cal Athletics Hall Of Fame in 2003.

== NFL career ==
Auzenne was selected in the second round by the Chicago Bears. Because of his pass-protection ability, he was named the starter at Left Tackle three weeks into camp and became the Bears' first offensive rookie in 16 years to start every game. At the end of the 1992 season he was the runner up offensive rookie of the year to the Saints' Vaughn Dunbar. He also won the Brian Piccolo Award. The Bears' players vote amongst themselves for the player who best exemplifies the courage, loyalty, teamwork, dedication and sense of humor of the late Brian Piccolo. In 1996 Auzenne signed with the Indianapolis Colts as a free agent. After one season his career was cut short by a knee injury.
