= LaSalle Harper =

American football player (born 1967)

No. 54
- Position: Linebacker

Personal information
- Born: May 16, 1967 (age 59); Galveston, Texas, U.S.
- Listed height: 6 ft 1 in (1.85 m)
- Listed weight: 235 lb (107 kg)

Career information
- High school: La Porte (TX)
- College: Arkansas
- NFL draft: 1989: 9th round, 243rd overall pick

Career history
- New York Giants (1989); Chicago Bears (1989); New York Giants (1990)*
- * Offseason or practice squad member only
- Stats at Pro Football Reference

LaSalle Harper (born May 16, 1967) is an American former professional football linebacker. He played for the New York Giants and Chicago Bears in 1989. He was selected by the Bears in the ninth round of the 1989 NFL draft with the 243rd overall pick.
