= Charles Tillman =

American football player and FBI special agent (born 1981)

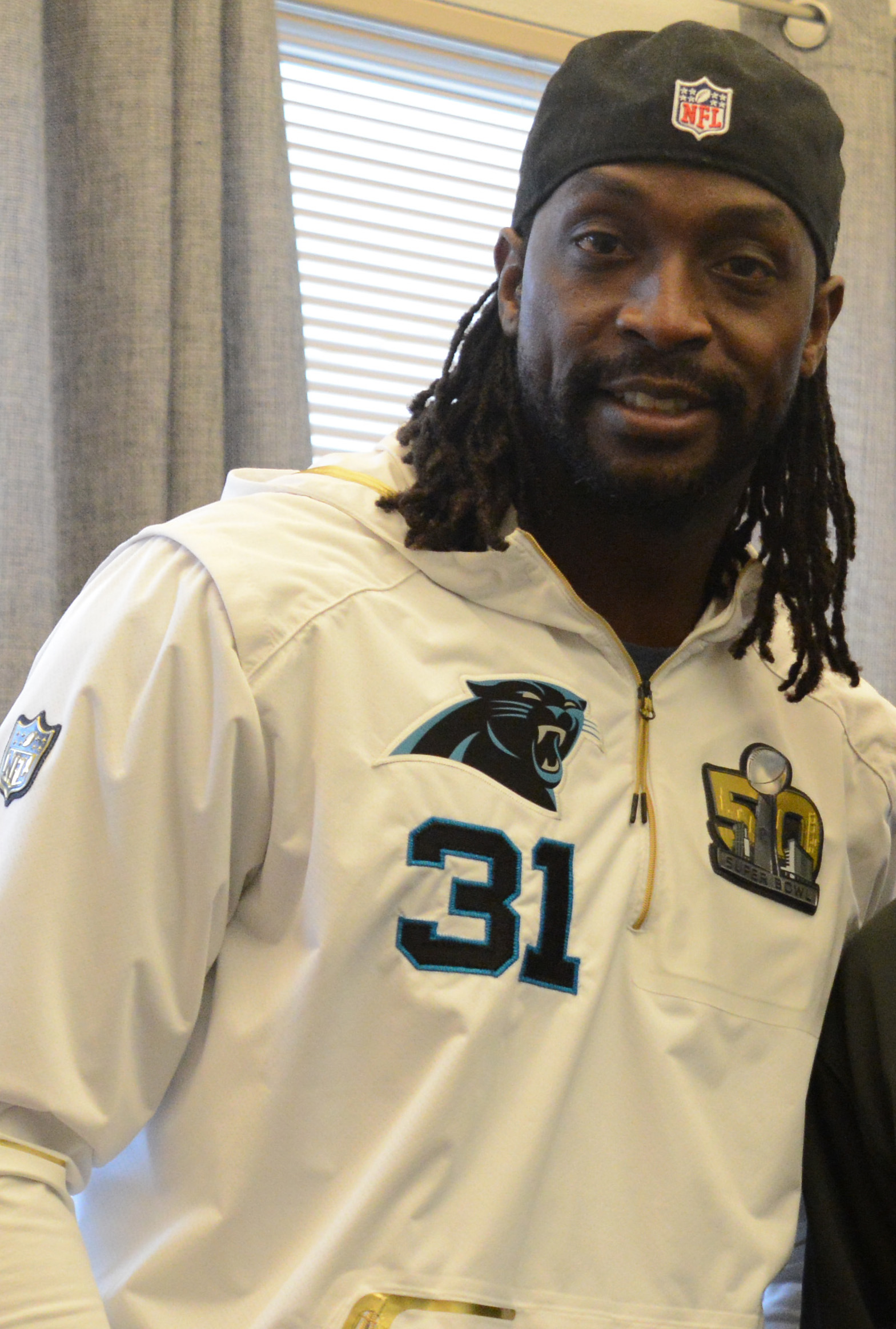
- Tillman with the Carolina Panthers in 2016

No. 33, 31
- Position: Cornerback

Personal information
- Born: February 23, 1981 (age 45); Chicago, Illinois, U.S.
- Listed height: 6 ft 2 in (1.88 m)
- Listed weight: 210 lb (95 kg)

Career information
- High school: Copperas Cove (Copperas Cove, Texas)
- College: Louisiana–Lafayette (1999–2002)
- NFL draft: 2003: 2nd round, 35th overall pick

Career history
- Chicago Bears (2003–2014); Carolina Panthers (2015)

Awards and highlights
- Walter Payton NFL Man of the Year (2013); First-team All-Pro (2012); 2× Pro Bowl (2011, 2012); FD Defensive Rookie of the Year (2003); NFL forced fumbles leader (2012); 100 greatest Bears of All-Time; 2× First-team All-Sun Belt (2001, 2002); NFL records: Most forced fumbles in a season: 10 (2012 (Note: Tied with Osi Umenyiora (2010).)); Most forced fumbles in a game: 4

Career NFL statistics
- Total tackles: 930
- Sacks: 3.0
- Forced fumbles: 44
- Fumble recoveries: 11
- Pass deflections: 140
- Interceptions: 38
- Defensive touchdowns: 9
- Stats at Pro Football Reference

Other information
- Police career
- Department: Federal Bureau of Investigation
- Service years: 2018–2025
- Status: Retired
- Rank: Special Agent

Charles Anthony Tillman (born February 23, 1981), nicknamed "Peanut", is an American former professional football player who was a cornerback in the National Football League (NFL). He played college football for the Louisiana–Lafayette Ragin' Cajuns, and was selected by the Chicago Bears in the second round of the 2003 NFL draft.

Tillman played 12 years for the Bears, helping them reach Super Bowl XLI, and also played one year with the Carolina Panthers, making Super Bowl 50 with the team, although he had been placed on injured reserve earlier in the season. He was selected to two Pro Bowls and was the Walter Payton Man of the Year in 2013.

He was known for his cover skills as well as his ability to force fumbles by stripping or "punching" the ball away from an opponent with a well-timed technique commonly known as the "Peanut Punch". After retiring from the NFL, Tillman was an FBI agent from 2018 to 2025.

== Early life ==
Tillman was born in Chicago, Illinois, but spent a majority of his youth traveling around the world. His father, Donald Tillman Jr., a sergeant in the United States Army, was frequently stationed in different locations, ranging from United States to Germany. Tillman attended eleven different schools during his youth, but eventually graduated from Copperas Cove High School in Texas. During his time at the school, Tillman was a two-time All-District 8-5A and all-area team selection. The Austin American-Statesman and All-State Class 5A honorable mention named him to the Super Cen-Tex team.

== College career ==
Tillman attended the University of Louisiana at Lafayette, where he played for the Louisiana–Lafayette Ragin' Cajuns football team from 1999 to 2002. He started for all four years as a left cornerback after being a wide receiver in high school. His Ragin' Cajuns teammates included future Pittsburgh Steelers cornerback Ike Taylor.

Tillman graduated from ULL with a bachelor's degree in criminal justice.

== Professional career ==
Pre-draft measurables
Height	Weight	Arm length	Hand span	40-yard dash	10-yard split	20-yard split	20-yard shuttle	Three-cone drill	Vertical jump	Broad jump	Bench press
6 ft 1 1/8 in (1.86 m)	207 lb (94 kg)	31 in (0.79 m)	9 3/4 in (0.25 m)	4.49 s	1.56 s	2.63 s	3.89 s	7.05 s	40.0 in (1.02 m)	10 ft 11 in (3.33 m)	12 reps
All values from NFL Combine

=== Chicago Bears ===
==== 2003 ====
The Chicago Bears selected Tillman in the second round (35th overall) in the 2003 NFL draft. He was the sixth cornerback drafted and the first of two cornerbacks selected from Louisiana–Lafayette in 2003, along with fourth-round pick (125th overall) Ike Taylor. He was only the 10th Louisiana–Lafayette player to be selected in the NFL draft and surpassed 1998 second-round pick (36th overall) Anthony Clement to become the highest selection in the NFL draft from Louisiana–Lafayette, which he still remains as of 2025.

On August 1, 2003, the Bears signed Tillman to a five–year, $4.32 million contract that includes a signing bonus of $2.05 million. He started training camp as a candidate to earn the role as the third cornerback on the depth chart, competing against Todd McMillon and Roosevelt Williams under defensive coordinator Greg Blache. Head coach Dick Jauron named him a backup and listed him as the third cornerback on the depth chart to begin the season, behind starting cornerbacks R. W. McQuarters and Jerry Azumah.

On September 7, 2003, Tillman made his professional regular season debut in the Chicago Bears' season-opener at the San Francisco 49ers and made four solo tackles and made the first forced fumble of his career while covering a punt return by Jimmy Williams during a 49–7 loss. His forced fumble on Jimmy Williams occurred in the fourth quarter and was recovered by Bears' long snapper Patrick Mannelly. Following a third consecutive loss to start the season 0–3, Tillman was announced as a starting cornerback beginning in Week 5 against the Oakland Raiders, supplanting Jerry Azumah, and would be tasked with covering Tim Brown and Jerry Rice. In Week 5, Tillman earned his first career start and recorded six solo tackles and made one pass deflection during a 24–21 victory against the Oakland Raiders. On October 26, 2003, Tillman recorded eight solo tackles, had one pass break-up, and made his first career interception off a pass by Joey Harrington to wide receiver Az-Zahir Hakim and returned it for 32–yards as the Bears defeated the Detroit Lions 24–16. The following week, he had one solo tackle, two pass deflections, and had his second consecutive game with an interception on a pass attempt by Drew Brees to wide receiver David Boston during a 20–7 win against the San Diego Chargers in Week 9. In Week 11, he set a season-high with 11 combined tackles (nine solo), made two pass deflections, and intercepted a pass by Marc Bulger to wide receiver Torry Holt during a 23–21 loss against the St. Louis Rams. In Week 12, he made six solo tackles and had his first career sack on Jake Plummer for a three–yard loss during a 19–10 victory at the Denver Broncos. In Week 14, he set a season-high with ten solo tackles (11 combined) during a 21–34 loss at the Green Bay Packers. On December 14, 2003, Tillman made ten combined tackles (nine solo), set a season-high with three pass deflections, and sealed a 13–10 victory against the Minnesota Vikings by intercepting a hail-mary pass in the endzone thrown by Daunte Culpepper to wide receiver Randy Moss with 1:11 remaining in the game. He finished his rookie season in 2003 with a total of 86 combined tackles (79 solo), 12 pass deflections, four interceptions, two forced fumbles, and one sack in 16 games and 13 starts. On December 29, the Bears fired Dick Jauron after they finished the 2003 NFL season with a 7–9 record.

==== 2004 ====
He entered training camp slated as the No. 1 starting cornerback under new defensive coordinator Ron Rivera. Head coach Lovie Smith named Tillman and R. W. McQuarters the starting cornerbacks to begin season. On September 19, 2004, Tillman collected a season-high 11 combined tackles (nine solo) during a 21–10 victory at the Green Bay Packers in Week 2. Tillman sustained a knee injury and was sidelined for the next eight games (Weeks 3–11). In Week 16, he recorded five combined tackles (four solo) and set a season-high with three pass deflections during a 13–19 loss at the Detroit Lions. He finished the 2004 NFL season with 39 combined tackles (32 solo), five pass deflections, and one forced fumble in eight games and seven starts.

==== 2005 ====
Head coach Lovie Smith retained Tillman as the No. 1 starting cornerback to begin the season, and paired him with Nathan Vasher. On October 30, 2005, Tillman recorded seven combined tackles (six solo), deflected two passes, and returned an interception for his first career touchdown during a 19–13 overtime victory at the Detroit Lions. He scored the game-winning touchdown after intercepting a pass by Jeff Garcia thrown to wide receiver Mike Williams, and returned it for a 22–yard touchdown to help the Bears defeat the Lions in overtime after a 13–13 tie in regulation. In Week 12, he set a new season-high with ten combined tackles (nine solo) during a 13–10 victory at the Tampa Bay Buccaneers. On December 4, 2005, Tillman had one of his best overall performances recording seven combined tackles (six solo, set a season-high with three pass deflections, made his lone sack of the season, forced a fumble, recovered a muffed punt, and also intercepted a pass by Brett Favre to wide receiver Robert Ferguson and returned it for 95–yards as the Bears defeated the Green Bay Packers 19–7. On December 11, 2005, Tillman recorded eight combined tackles (five solo), deflected a pass, and made a season-high two forced fumbles during a 21–9 loss at the Pittsburgh Steelers in Week 14. Tillman forced a fumble by Verron Haynes and Cedrick Wilson during the game. In Week 16, Tillman made eight combined tackles (seven solo), one pass deflection, and set a career-high with his fifth interception of the season on a pick thrown by Brett Favre to wide receiver Robert Ferguson during a 24–7 victory at the Green Bay Packers. Head coach Lovie Smith chose to rest Tillman and multiple other starters in preparation for the playoffs as the Bears lost 10–34 at the Minnesota Vikings in Week 17. He finished the season with 93 combined tackles (82 solo), 11 pass deflections, five interceptions, four forced fumbles, one sack, and one touchdown in 15 games and 15 starts.

The Chicago Bears finished atop the NFC North with an 11–5 record in 2005, earning a first-round bye. On January 15, 2006, Tillman started his first career playoff game and recorded six solo tackles and a pass deflection as the Bears lost 29–21 against the Carolina Panthers in the NFC Divisional Round. His efforts helped the Bears establish the league's best defense in 2005.

==== 2006 ====
He returned as the No. 1 starting cornerback to begin the season and remained alongside Nathan Vasher. On October 16, 2006, Tillman made six combined tackles (four solo), one pass deflection, and returned a fumble recovery for a touchdown to help lead the Bears to a 24–23 late 13 point comeback victory at the Arizona Cardinals that would be remembered for Cardinals' head coach Dennis Green's infamous rant over the upset. With only 5:11 remaining while losing 10–23 in the fourth quarter, linebacker Brian Urlacher forced a fumble by running back Edgerrin James that was recovered by Tillman and returned for a 40–yard touchdown. Devin Hester would follow it up with an 83–yard punt return for a touchdown to lead the Bears to a 24–23 lead with 2:58 remaining. With 52 seconds remaining Cardinals' kicker Neil Rackers would miss the 40–yard field goal. On November 11, 2006, Tillman made three solo tackles, set a season-high with three pass deflections, and intercepted a pass attempt by Eli Manning thrown to wide receiver Plaxico Burress during a 38–20 victory at the New York Giants on Sunday Night Football. Days prior, Burress stated he thought the Bears' secondary was "average" and "very beatable". The Bears were ranked as the best pass defense in the League at the time.

Tillman limited Burress to only three receptions for 32–yards and had one interception while covering him during the game. Burress finished with only four receptions on 11 targets for 48–yards. On November 26, 2006, Tillman made seven combined tackles (six solo), three pass deflections, and set a season-high with two interceptions off passes thrown by Tom Brady during a 13–17 loss at the New England Patriots. This marked this first multi-interception performance of his career. In Week 14, he recorded seven combined tackles (six solo), had two pass break-ups, and secured a 42–27 win at the St. Louis Rams by intercepting a pass by Marc Bulger to wide receiver Isaac Bruce with only 1:12 remaining. He was inactive for the last two games (Weeks 16–17) of the season due to a back injury. He finished the season with 81 combined tackles (65 solo), 14 pass deflections, five interceptions, a forced fumble, one fumble recovery, and a touchdown in 14 games and 14 starts.

The Chicago Bears finished the 2006 NFL season in first place in the NFC North with a 13–3 record to earn a first-round bye. On January 14, 2007, Tillman recorded nine combined tackles (seven solo) and had one pass break-up during a 27–24 overtime win against the Seattle Seahawks in the Divisional Round. The following week, the Bears routed the New Orleans Saints 39–14 to win the NFC Championship Game and advance to the Super Bowl. On February 4, 2007, Tillman started in Super Bowl XLI and recorded 11 combined tackles (seven solo), made one forced fumble, and a fumble recovery as the Bears lost 17–29 to the Indianapolis Colts.

==== 2007 ====
On July 24, 2007, the Chicago Bears signed Tillman to a six—year, $64.00 million contract extension that included $11.00 million guaranteed and an initial signing bonus of $8.76 million. The Bears promoted linebackers coach Bob Babich to defensive coordinator following the departure of Ron Rivera following failed contract negotiations. He returned to training camp slated as the de facto No. 1 starting cornerback. Head coach Lovie Smith named Tillman and Nathan Vasher the starting cornerbacks to begin the season, alongside starting nickelback Ricky Manning.

In Week 3, Tillman recorded six solo tackles and made two pass deflections before spraining his ankle during a 30–34 loss to the Dallas Cowboys. Nathan Vasher sustained a groin injury during the game and both would subsequently remain inactive as the Bears lost 27–37 at the Detroit Lions in Week 4. Nathan Vasher would remain inactive for ten consecutive games (Weeks 4–14) due to his injured groin. In his place, Tillman would be paired with rookie Trumaine McBride. In Week 12, he made three combined tackles (two solo), set a season-high with three pass deflections, and intercepted a pass from Jay Cutler to wide receiver Brandon Marshall during a 37–34 overtime victory to the Denver Broncos. In Week 15, he set a season-high with 12 combined tackles (11 solo) as the Bears lost 13–20 at the Minnesota Vikings. He finished the 2007 NFL season with a total of 76 combined tackles (67 solo), 13 pass deflections, four forced fumbles, and made three interceptions in 15 games and 15 starts.

==== 2008 ====
Head coach Lovie Smith named Tillman and Nathan Vasher as the starting cornerbacks for the fourth consecutive season. On September 25, 2008, he set a season-high with 11 combined tackles (ten solo) and made two pass deflections as the Bears lost in overtime 24–27 against the Tampa Bay Buccaneers. In Week 5, Tillman made two combined tackles (one solo), set a season-high with four pass deflections, and had a pick-six after returning an interception that was thrown by Dan Orlovsky to wide receiver Roy Williams during a 34–7 victory at the Detroit Lions. He was inactive during a 48–41 victory against the Minnesota Vikings in Week 7 due to a shoulder injury. He finished the 2008 NFL season with a total of 93 combined tackles (81 solo), 17 pass deflections, and three interceptions in 15 games and 15 starts.

==== 2009 ====
He returned as the No. 1 starting cornerback and remained with Nathan Vasher. On September 20, 2009, he made six combined tackles (four solo), one pass deflection, forced a fumble, and intercepted a pass by Ben Roethlisberger to wide receiver Mike Wallace during a 17–14 victory against the Pittsburgh Steelers. In Week 8, Tillman recorded four combined tackles (three solo), made one pass deflection, had a fumble recovery, and had his only pick-six of the season after picking off a pass Derek Anderson three to wide receiver Mohamed Massaquoi during a 30–6 win against the Cleveland Browns. On November 22, 2009, Tillman recorded seven combined tackles (six solo) and set a career-high with three forced fumbles, two recovered by Chicago, as the Bears lost 20–24 to the Philadelphia Eagles on Sunday Night Football.

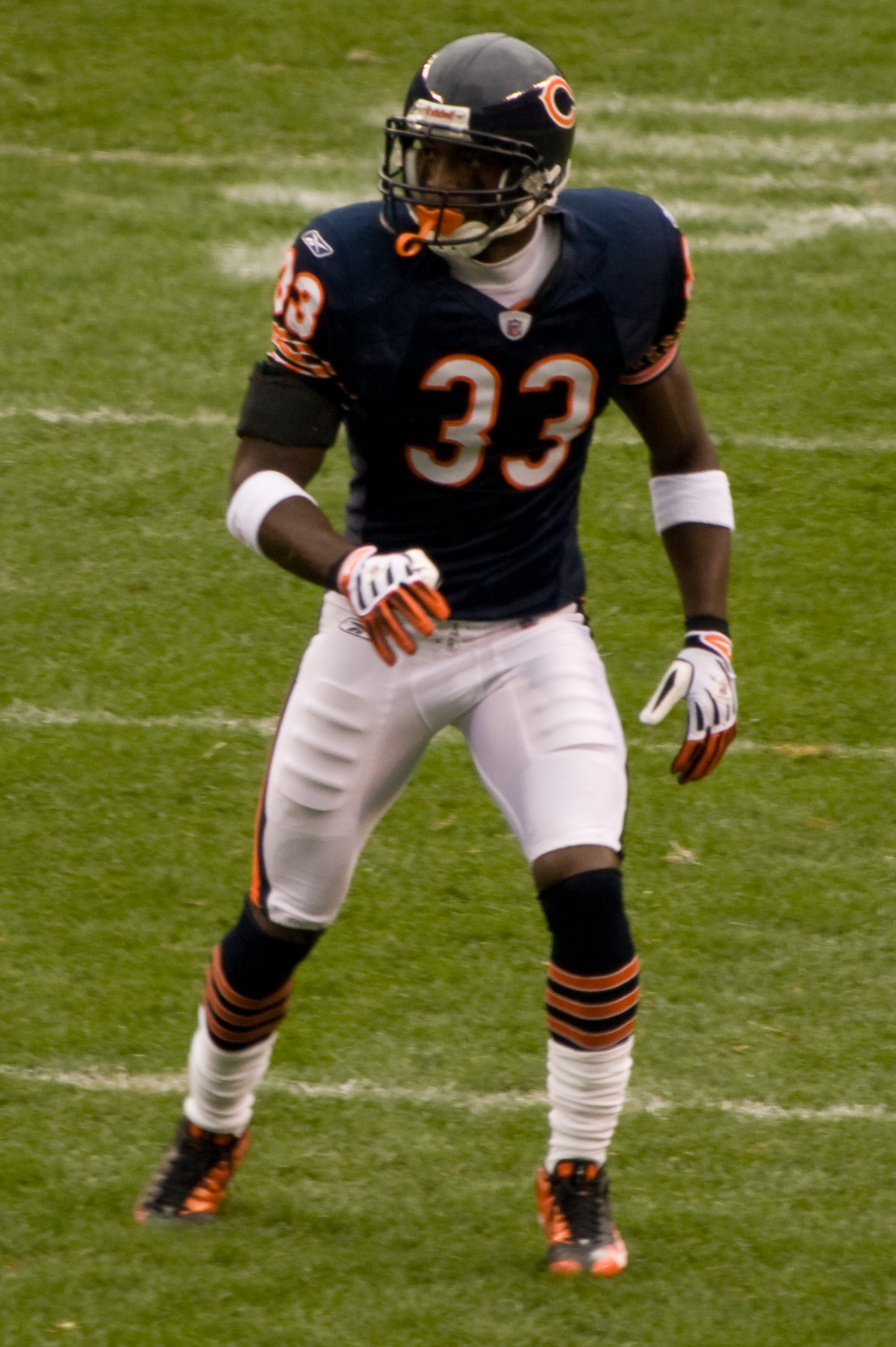
Tillman with the Bears in 2008

In Week 15, he set a season-high with eight combined tackles (seven solo) during a 7–21 loss at the Baltimore Ravens. On December 28, 2009, Tillman made seven combined tackles (six solo) and one pass deflection before he was carted off the field in the fourth quarter of the 36–30 overtime victory against the Minnesota Vikings on Monday Night Football after he injured his chest on an accidental collision with teammate Craig Steltz while he attempted to tackle Visanthe Shiancoe. The impact of the collision cracked some of Tillman's ribs and bruised one of his lungs. He was immediately rushed to the hospital, and released two days later, but remained inactive for the Bears' 37–23 victory at the Detroit Lions in Week 17. He finished the 2009 NFL season with 79 combined tackles (66 solo), seven pass deflections, six forced fumbles, two interceptions, and one touchdown in 15 games and 15 starts.

==== 2010 ====
Chicago Bears' head coach Lovie Smith chose to promote defensive line coach Rod Marinelli to defensive coordinator after he demoted Bob Babich back to linebackers coach. Tillman was retained as the No. 1 starting cornerback to begin the season, but was paired with Zackary Bowman, following the departure of Nathan Vasher. Following Week 3, Zackary Bowman was demoted in favor of Tim Jennings with Jennings remaining the starter alongside Tillman for the remainder of the season.

On October 10, 2010, Tillman recorded four combined tackles (two solo), set a season-high with three pass deflections, and intercepted a pass by Matt Moore to wide receiver David Gettis during a 23–6 win at the Carolina Panthers. In Week 15, he made four solo tackles, one pass deflection, and sealed a 40–14 victory at the Minnesota Vikings by intercepting a pass by Joe Webb to wide receiver Hank Baskett with 3:08 remaining. The following week, he tied his season-high of eight solo tackles and had one pass break-up as the Bears defeated the New York Jets 38–34. On January 2, 2011, Tillman made three combined tackles (two solo), one pass deflection, a fumble recovery, and tied his career-high with his fifth interception of the season on a pass by Aaron Rodgers to wide receiver Greg Jennings during a 10–3 loss at the Green Bay Packers. He started in all 16 games for the first time in his eight–year career and finished with a total of 82 combined tackles (71 solo), 14 pass deflections, and a career-high five interceptions.

==== 2011 ====
He returned as the de facto No. 1 starting cornerback to begin the season and was paired with Tim Jennings. In Week 6, he set a season-high with 11 combined tackles (10 solo) as the Bears defeated the Minnesota Vikings 39–10. On November 13, 2011, Tillman recorded five solo tackles, set a season-high with three pass deflections, and returned an interception thrown by Matthew Stafford to wide receiver Calvin Johnson for a 44–yard touchdown during a 13–37 win against the Detroit Lions. On January 1, 2012, Tillman made six combined tackles (two solo), one pass deflection, and had a pick-six by returning an interception on a pass thrown by Christian Ponder to running back Toby Gerhart for a 22–yard touchdown during a 17–13 victory at the Minnesota Vikings. He started in all 16 games throughout the 2011 NFL season and set a career-high with 100 combined tackles (83 solo), 12 pass deflections, four forced fumbles, two fumble recoveries, three interceptions, and scored two touchdowns. He was named to the 2012 Pro Bowl, making it the first Pro Bowl selection in nine seasons.

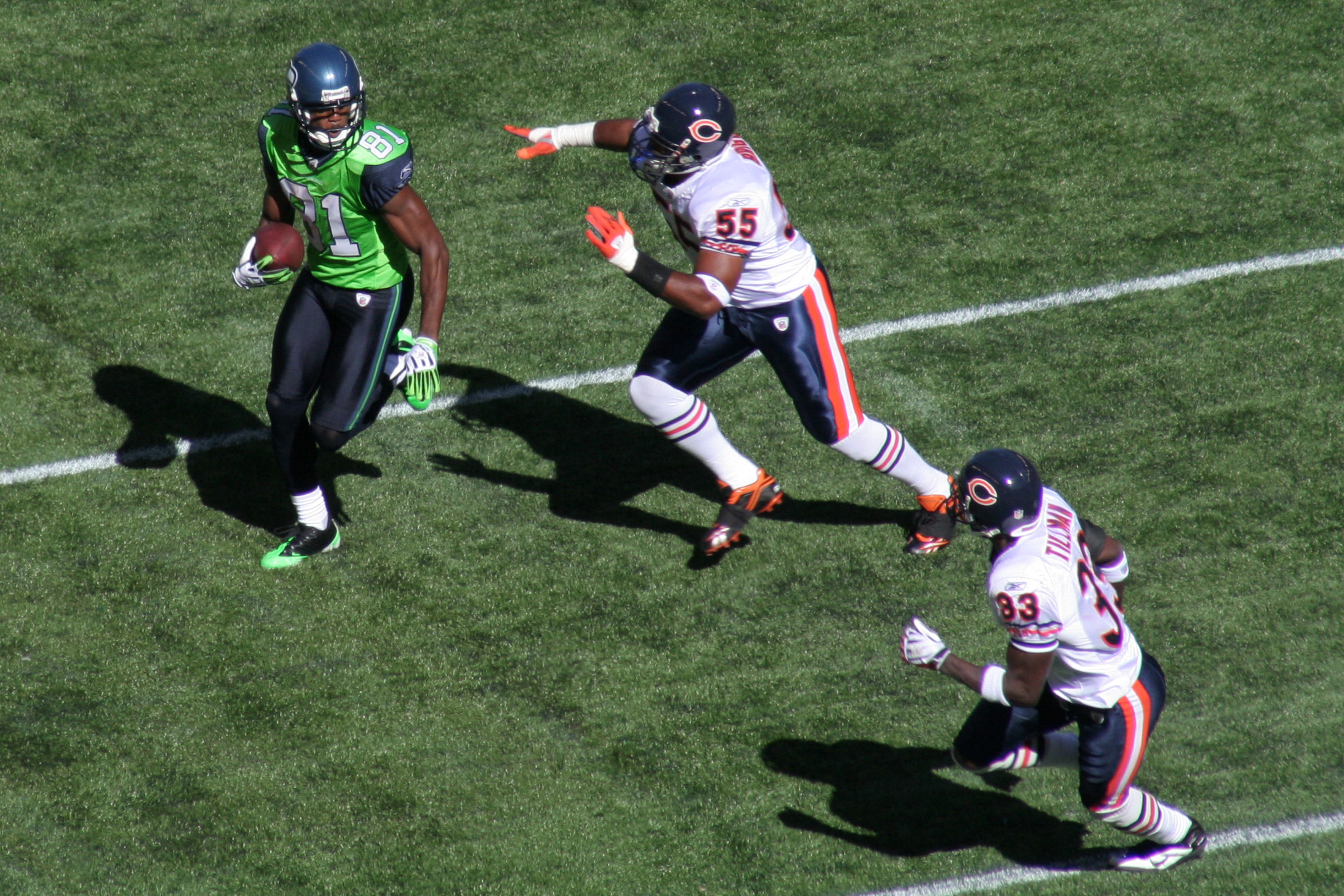
Tillman (bottom right) and Lance Briggs defend Seattle Seahawks receiver Nate Burleson

==== 2012 ====
He returned alongside Tim Jennings as the starting cornerbacks to begin the season. On October 1, 2012, Tillman recorded five combined tackles (four solo), made a pass deflection, and returned an interception on a pass by Tony Romo to wide receiver Dez Bryant for a 25–yard touchdown during a 34–18 victory at the Dallas Cowboys. On October 7, 2012, Tillman made four solo tackles, one pass deflection, and had his second consecutive game with a pick-six after intercepting a pass by Blaine Gabbert to wide receiver Justin Blackmon during a 41–3 win at the Jacksonville Jaguars. The touchdown marked the eighth defensive touchdown of his career and earned him the Bears' franchise record for most defensive touchdowns in a career, surpassing the previous record of seven by his former teammate Mike Brown (2000—2008).

On November 4, 2012, Tillman had one of the best overall performances of his career when he set a season-high with nine solo tackles, made one pass deflection, and set a career-high with four forced fumbles during a 51–20 win at the Tennessee Titans. Three of the four were recovered by the Bears and led to touchdowns as a result. His four forced fumbles is the record for the most known forced fumbles by a single player in a game since the stat was officially recognized and recorded in 1991. In Week 16, he made eight solo tackles, one pass deflection, and returned an interception on a pass thrown by Ryan Lindley to wide receiver Andre Roberts for a 10–yard touchdown as the Bears won 28–13 at the Arizona Cardinals. He started all 16 games for the third consecutive season in-a-row and finished the 2012 NFL season with a total of 87 combined tackles (75 solo), 16 pass deflections, set a career-high with 10 forced fumbles, three interceptions, set a career-high with three touchdowns, and made two fumble recoveries. He was named to the 2013 Pro Bowl, marking his second consecutive Pro Bowl selection, making him the first Bears defensive back to be named to back-to-back Pro Bowls since Mark Carrier (1990—1991). He was later named to his first All-Pro team, placed on the first-team. He led the league in forced fumbles (10) in 2012 and also tied for the most pick-sixes that season, along with St. Louis Rams' Janoris Jenkins. On December 31, 2012, the Bears announced their decision to fire head coach Lovie Smith after finishing with a 10–6 record in 2012. Tillman was considered by various sources as a Defensive Player of the Year candidate, competing with Houston Texans defensive end J. J. Watt.

==== 2013 ====
On January 16, 2013, the Chicago Bears hired Marc Trestman as their new head coach. Defensive coordinator Mel Tucker retained Tillman and Tim Jennings as the starting cornerbacks to begin the season. On September 8, 2013, Tillman started in the Bears' home-opener against the Cincinnati Bengals and recorded seven combined tackles (five solo), had two pass break-ups, and set a season-high with two interceptions on passes thrown by Andy Dalton to wide receiver A. J. Green during a 23–24 victory. This was his second and last multi-interception game of his career with his first occurring against the New England Patriots in 2006. He was inactive as the Bears defeated the New York Giants 27–21 in Week 6 due to a knee injury. In Week 7, Tillman set a season-high with eight combined tackles (six solo), made two pass deflections, and had his last interception as a member of the Bears by picking off a pass Robert Griffin III threw to wide receiver Leonard Hankerson during a 41–45 loss at the Washington Redskins. In Week 10, Tillman recorded five solo tackles and made two pass deflections, but suffered a torn triceps while shoving Calvin Johnson while covering him in the fourth quarter of a 21–19 loss to the Detroit Lions. Although Tillman was injured, he managed to complete the game, but was responsible for giving up the game-winning touchdown on a 14–yard touchdown reception by Calvin Johnson with 2:22 remaining. Tillman refused to blame his injury or state it effected his ability to play. On November 11, 2013, it was reported that Tillman tore his right triceps, and was placed on injured reserve with the designation to return as it was initially thought he would not require surgery, and could return by the playoffs with an expected recovery time of 4–6 weeks. On December 16, 2013, Bears' head coach Marc Trestman would indefinitely remain inactive for the remainder of the season, including playoffs, after it was determined he would require surgery to repair his torn triceps. He remained inactive for the last seven games (Weeks 11–17) of the season. He finished the season with a total of 42 combined tackles (33 solo), six pass deflections, three interceptions, and three forced fumbles in eight games and eight starts. He was awarded the Walter Payton Man of the Year to acknowledge his charitable efforts in the community.

Tillman is tied with Donnell Woolford for the most interceptions by a cornerback in team history, trailing only safeties Gary Fencik and Richie Petitbon. He also has forced 36 fumbles, which is the most by a defensive back in the league since 2003.

==== 2014 ====
On March 14, 2014, the Chicago Bears signed Tillman to a one-year, $3.25 million contract extension that included $750,000 guaranteed and an initial signing bonus of $500,000. The Bears selected Kyle Fuller in the first-round (14th overall) of the 2014 NFL draft. Head coach Marc Trestman retained Tillman and Tim Jennings as the starting cornerbacks to begin the season. In Week 2, Tillman started in his last game with the Chicago Bears and recorded four solo tackles and made one pass deflection before exiting in the third quarter of a 28–20 victory at the San Francisco 49ers after injuring his triceps again. On September 15, 2014, the Bears officially placed Tillman on season-ending injured reserve after it was confirmed he had torn right triceps for the second consecutive season and would remain inactive for the last 14 games (Weeks 3–17) of the season. He only started in two games and finished with only eight solo tackles and one pass deflection.

He holds the Bears' franchise record for most career defensive touchdowns (9) and also holds the record for the most career interceptions (36) among all Bears cornerbacks.

=== Carolina Panthers ===
On April 9, 2015, the Carolina Panthers signed Tillman to a one—year, $2 million contract that included a signing bonus of $350,000. His decision to sign with the Panthers reunited with head coach Ron Rivera who previously was the defensive coordinator for the Chicago Bears (2004–2006). He became the No. 2 starting cornerback, supplanting Bene Benwikere. Defensive coordinator Sean McDermott named Tillman and Josh Norman the starting cornerbacks to begin the season.

In Week 3, he set a season-high with nine combined tackles (six solo) during a 27–22 win against the New Orleans Saints. On November 2, 2015, Tillman recorded four combined tackles (two solo), set a season-high with three pass deflections, and intercepted a pass by Andrew Luck to wide receiver T. Y. Hilton during the Panthers 29–26 overtime victory over the Indianapolis Colts. He recorded his first forced fumble for the Panthers during their 37–29 victory over the Green Bay Packers. In Week 10, Tillman hyperextended his knee during a 27–10 victory at the Tennessee Titans and remained inactive for the next four games (Weeks 11–14). On December 20, 2015, Tillman made five combined tackles (four solo), a pass deflection, forced a fumble, and helped secure a 38–35 victory at the New York Giants by intercepting a pass by Eli Manning to wide receiver Hakeem Nicks in the fourth quarter, marking the last pick of his career. On January 3, 2016, Tillman appeared in the last game of his career and recorded three combined tackles (two solo) before exiting in the third quarter of a 38–10 win against the Tampa Bay Buccaneers due to a knee injury. He finished the season with 55 combined tackles (36 solo), seven pass deflections, two forced fumbles, two interceptions, and a fumble recovery in 12 games and 12 starts. On January 3, 2016, it was announced that MRIs confirmed that Tillman suffered a torn ACL and would subsequently miss the playoffs.

The Carolina Panthers finished in first place in the NFC South with a 15–1 record in 2015 and earned a first-round bye. On February 7, 2016, Tillman's Panthers played in Super Bowl 50. In the game, the Panthers fell to the Denver Broncos by a score of 24–10.

=== Retirement ===
On July 18, 2016, after 13 seasons in the NFL, Tillman announced his retirement from football via a three-minute YouTube video. He signed a ceremonial one-day contract to retire with the Chicago Bears on July 22.

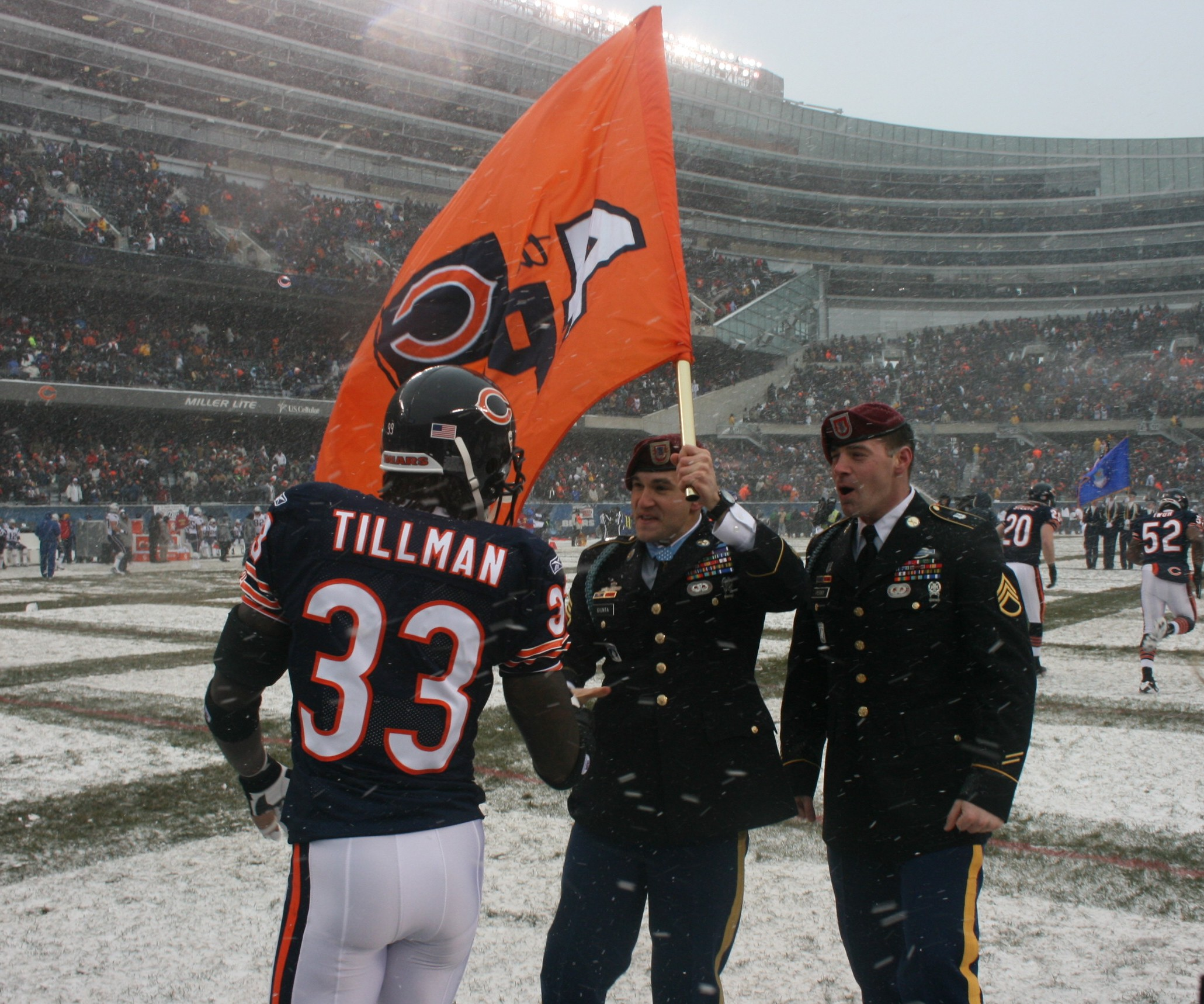
Tillman with Medal of Honor recipient Salvatore Giunta in 2010

== NFL career statistics ==
Legend
	NFL record
**Bold**	Career high

Year	Team	Games		Tackles				Fumbles			Interceptions					
Year	Team	GP	GS	Cmb	Solo	Ast	Sck	FF	FR	Yds	Int	Yds	Avg	Lng	TD	PD
2003	CHI	**16**	13	83	76	7	**1.0**	2	0	0	4	27	6.8	32	0	12
2004	CHI	8	7	39	32	7	0.0	1	1	0	0	0	0.0	0	0	5
2005	CHI	15	15	93	**82**	11	**1.0**	4	1	0	**5**	**172**	**34.4**	**95**	1	16
2006	CHI	14	14	80	68	12	0.0	1	1	**40**	**5**	32	6.4	13	1	14
2007	CHI	15	15	75	66	9	0.0	4	0	0	3	24	8.0	20	0	13
2008	CHI	15	15	93	81	12	0.0	4	0	0	3	52	17.3	26	1	**17**
2009	CHI	15	15	77	65	12	0.0	6	1	0	2	35	17.5	21	1	7
2010	CHI	**16**	**16**	82	71	11	0.0	4	**3**	-8	**5**	127	25.4	56	0	14
2011	CHI	**16**	**16**	**99**	**82**	17	**1.0**	3	2	4	3	66	22.0	44	2	12
2012	CHI	**16**	**16**	86	74	12	0.0	**10**	2	0	3	71	23.7	36	**3**	16
2013	CHI	8	8	41	32	9	0.0	3	0	0	3	69	23.0	41	0	7
2014	CHI	2	2	8	8	0	0.0	0	0	0	0	0	0.0	0	0	1
2015	CAR	12	12	55	36	**19**	0.0	2	1	0	2	0	0.0	0	0	0
Career		168	164	911	773	138	3.0	44	12	36	38	675	17.8	95	9	141

== Post-football career ==
Tillman had expressed interest in working in law enforcement. In September 2017, the Chicago Tribune reported that he was training with federal agents at the FBI Training Academy in Quantico, Virginia. Tillman previously trained with law enforcement officers while playing in the NFL during the offseason. He gained the qualification a day before his 37th birthday. He departed the FBI in 2025, citing discontent with enforcing the immigration policies put forth by the Donald Trump administration. "I didn’t want to be a guy who would say, ‘No, I’m not doing that,’” Tillman said. “At that point, for me it was time for me to walk away...I loved my job. I loved the people I worked with. I loved everything. But the immigration stuff hit me differently.”

== Personal life ==
Tillman often makes appearances on Fox Chicago Sports shows. He also organizes, runs, and advocates numerous charitable functions. Tillman's Aunt Renee nicknamed him "Peanut", since his body resembled the shape of a peanut during infancy. Safety Mike Brown spread the nickname after meeting Tillman during his rookie year. He and his wife, Jackie, have three daughters and a son. In November 2012, Tillman stated that he might miss the Bears game against the Houston Texans in case his wife went into labor, but ended up playing the entire game. On November 13, Tillman and his wife had their third daughter.

Tillman's Cornerstone Foundation mission is to help improve the lives of critically and chronically ill children throughout Chicago. Tillman created the foundation after his second-youngest daughter was diagnosed with dilated cardiomyopathy, which resulted in a heart transplant.

Tillman has worked with United Services Automobile Association (USAA) as part of the insurance company's "Thank You" campaign, highlighting cooperation between the NFL and the military services.

In September 2019, Tillman rowed across Lake Michigan to raise awareness and nearly $200,000 for childhood cancer.
