= Dave Zawatson =

American football player (born 1966)

No. 64, 63, 75
- Positions: Guard, tackle

Personal information
- Born: April 13, 1966 (age 60); Cleveland, Ohio, U.S.
- Listed height: 6 ft 5 in (1.96 m)
- Listed weight: 275 lb (125 kg)

Career information
- High school: Ygnacio Valley (Concord, California)
- College: California
- NFL draft: 1989: 2nd round, 54th overall pick

Career history
- Chicago Bears (1989); New York Jets (1990); Miami Dolphins (1991); Atlanta Falcons (1992)*
- * Offseason or practice squad member only

Awards and highlights
- Second-team All-Pac-10 (1987)

Career NFL statistics
- Games played: 22
- Stats at Pro Football Reference

David Francis Zawatson (born April 13, 1966) is an American former professional football player who was an offensive guard in the National Football League (NFL). He played college football for the California Golden Bears.

== Life ==
Zawatson was born in 1966, in Cleveland Ohio. He attended the University of California, Berkeley. He was selected in the second round of the 1989 NFL draft by the Chicago Bears with the 54th overall pick.

He played for the Bears (1989), New York Jets (1990), Miami Dolphins (1991), and Atlanta Falcons (1992).

He is currently the district director for PE, recreation and athletics for the Great Neck Public Schools and the coordinator for the Nassau BOCES PE Consortium.

He is currently married to Panagiota Kanakaki.
