= James Thornton (tight end) =

American football player (born 1965)

No. 80
- Position: Tight end

Personal information
- Born: February 8, 1965 (age 61); Santa Rosa, California, U.S.
- Listed height: 6 ft 2 in (1.88 m)
- Listed weight: 242 lb (110 kg)

Career information
- High school: Analy (Sebastopol, California)
- College: Cal State-Fullerton
- NFL draft: 1988: 4th round, 105th overall pick

Career history
- Chicago Bears (1988–1992); New York Jets (1993–1994); Houston Oilers (1995)

Career NFL statistics
- Receptions: 107
- Receiving yards: 1,338
- Touchdowns: 7
- Stats at Pro Football Reference

James Michael Thornton (born February 8, 1965) is an American former professional football player who played tight end for seven seasons for the Chicago Bears, the New York Jets, and the Houston Oilers. He was given the nickname "RoboCop" because of his physique. He was selected by the Bears in the fourth round of the 1988 NFL draft. He played his high school career at Analy High School in Sebastopol, California.

== NFL career statistics ==
Legend
**Bold**	Career high

=== Regular season ===
Year	Team	Games		Receiving				
Year	Team	GP	GS	Rec	Yds	Avg	Lng	TD
1988	CHI	**16**	12	15	135	9.0	19	0
1989	CHI	**16**	**16**	**24**	**392**	16.3	**36**	**3**
1990	CHI	**16**	**16**	19	254	13.4	32	1
1991	CHI	**16**	13	17	278	**16.4**	33	1
1993	NYJ	13	6	12	108	9.0	22	2
1994	NYJ	15	5	20	171	8.6	25	0
1995	HOU	4	2	0	0	0.0	0	0
Career		96	70	107	1,338	12.5	36	7

=== Playoffs ===
Year	Team	Games		Receiving				
Year	Team	GP	GS	Rec	Yds	Avg	Lng	TD
1988	CHI	**2**	**2**	4	52	13.0	18	0
1990	CHI	**2**	**2**	**5**	**71**	**14.2**	**25**	**1**
1991	CHI	1	0	1	12	12.0	12	0
Career		5	4	10	135	13.5	25	1
