= Brent Snyder =

Profile
- Position: Quarterback

Personal information
- Born: June 4, 1966 (age 60); Joliet, Illinois, U.S.
- Listed height: 6 ft 3 in (1.91 m)
- Listed weight: 225 lb (102 kg)

Career information
- High school: Joliet West (Joliet, IL)
- College: Northern Illinois (1984–1985): Diablo Valley JC (1986); Utah State (1987–1988)
- NFL draft: 1989: 7th round, 192nd overall pick

Career history
- Chicago Bears (1989)*
- * Offseason or practice squad member only

Brent Snyder (born June 4, 1966) is a former American football quarterback. He grew up in Joliet, Illinois, and played quarterback at Joliet West High School. He then played college football for the Northern Illinois Huskies in 1984 and 1985, Diablo Valley Junior College in 1986, and the Utah State Aggies in 1987 and 1988. On October 24, 1987, he tallied 360 passing yards and five passing touchdowns in a 41–36 victory over rival Utah. He ranked among the leading quarterbacks in major-college football with 2,887 passing yards in 1987 (7th), 3,218 passing yards in 1988 (4th), 20 passing touchdowns in 1987 (4th), 19 passing touchdowns in 1988 (9th), 2,774 total yards in 1987 (6th), 3,154 total yards in 1988 (4th), and 21 interceptions in 1988 (2nd). He was selected by the Chicago Bears in the seventh round (192nd overall pick) of the 1989 NFL draft. He played with the Bears in the 1989 preseason, but was released before the regular season.
