= David Tate (American football) =

American football player (born 1964)

No. 49
- Position: Safety

Personal information
- Born: November 22, 1964 (age 61); Denver, Colorado, U.S.
- Listed height: 6 ft 1 in (1.85 m)
- Listed weight: 197 lb (89 kg)

Career information
- High school: Mullen (Denver)
- College: Colorado
- NFL draft: 1988: 8th round, 210th overall pick

Career history
- Chicago Bears (1988–1992); New York Jets (1993)*; New York Giants (1993); Indianapolis Colts (1994–1997)
- * Offseason or practice squad member only

Career NFL statistics
- Tackles: 455
- Interceptions: 11
- Fumble recoveries: 2
- Stats at Pro Football Reference

David Fitzgerald Tate (born November 22, 1964) is an American former professional football player who was a defensive back in the National Football League (NFL) for the Chicago Bears (1988–1992), the New York Giants (1993) and the Indianapolis Colts (1994–1997). He played college football for the Colorado Buffaloes and was selected in the eighth round of the 1988 NFL draft.
