= James Coley (tight end) =

American football player (born 1967)

No. 89, 87
- Position: Tight end

Personal information
- Born: April 13, 1967 (age 59); Jacksonville, Florida, U.S.
- Listed height: 6 ft 3 in (1.91 m)
- Listed weight: 270 lb (122 kg)

Career information
- High school: Robert E. Lee (Jacksonville)
- College: Clemson (1985–1988)
- NFL draft: 1989: undrafted

Career history
- Chicago Bears (1989–1990); Indianapolis Colts (1991); Tampa Bay Storm (1994)

Career NFL statistics
- Receptions: 2
- Receiving yards: 20
- Stats at Pro Football Reference

James Lester Coley (born April 13, 1967) is an American former professional football player who was a tight end for two seasons in the National Football League (NFL) with the Chicago Bears and Indianapolis Colts. He played college football for the Clemson Tigers. He was also a member of the Tampa Bay Storm of the Arena Football League.

== Early life and college ==
James Lester Coley was born on April 13, 1967, in Jacksonville, Florida. He attended Robert E. Lee High School in Jacksonville.

He lettered for the Clemson Tigers from 1985 to 1988. He caught seven passes for 108 yards and one touchdown his junior year in 1987. He recorded six receptions for 86 yards as a senior in 1988.

== Professional career ==
After going undrafted in the 1989 NFL draft, Coley was signed by the Chicago Bears on May 4, 1989. He was waived on September 5 and signed to the practice squad the next day, where he spent the remainder of the 1989 season. He became a free agent after the season and re-signed with the Bears on March 15, 1990. Coley played in all 16 games for the Bears during the 1990 season, catching one pass for seven yards. He also appeared in two playoff games that season. He was released by the Bears on August 26, 1991.

Coley signed with the Indianapolis Colts on September 18, 1991. He played in seven games, starting four, for the Colts that season and recorded one reception for 13 yards. He was released on November 20, 1991.

Coley played in three games for the Tampa Bay Storm of the Arena Football League in 1994 as an offensive lineman/defensive lineman, totaling four solo tackles and one fumble recovery. He played both offense and defense in the AFL as the league played under ironman rules.
