= Jerry Fontenot =

American football player and coach (born 1966)

No. 67, 62
- Position: Center

Personal information
- Born: November 21, 1966 (age 59); Lafayette, Louisiana, U.S.
- Listed height: 6 ft 3 in (1.91 m)
- Listed weight: 300 lb (136 kg)

Career information
- High school: Lafayette (LA)
- College: Texas A&M
- NFL draft: 1989: 3rd round, 65th overall pick

Career history

Playing
- Chicago Bears (1989–1996); New Orleans Saints (1997–2003); Cincinnati Bengals (2004)

Coaching
- Green Bay Packers (2006–2010) Assistant offensive line coach; Green Bay Packers (2011) Running backs coach; Green Bay Packers (2012–2015) Tight ends coach; Los Angeles Wildcats (2020) Offensive line coach

Awards and highlights
- Super Bowl champion (XLV); First-team All-SWC (1988)

Career NFL statistics
- Games played: 239
- Games started: 195
- Fumble recoveries: 7
- Stats at Pro Football Reference

Jerry Paul Fontenot (born November 21, 1966) is an American football coach and former center who played in the National Football League (NFL) for the Chicago Bears, New Orleans Saints and Cincinnati Bengals.

Pre-draft measurables
Height	Weight	40-yard dash	10-yard split	20-yard split	20-yard shuttle	Vertical jump	Broad jump	Bench press
6 ft 3 1/2 in (1.92 m)	272 lb (123 kg)	5.17 s	1.76 s	3.01 s	4.48 s	28.0 in (0.71 m)	8 ft 10 in (2.69 m)	24 reps

He was drafted by the Bears in the third round of the 1989 NFL Draft with the 65th overall pick. He attended Texas A&M University.

Fontenot served as an assistant offensive line coach and tight ends coach for the Green Bay Packers from 2006 to 2015. On January 19, 2016, Fontenot was fired. In 2019, he became offensive line coach for the Los Angeles Wildcats of the XFL.
