= 1983 All-SEC football team =

American college football all-star team

The 1983 All-SEC football team consists of American football players selected to the All-Southeastern Conference (SEC) chosen by various selectors for the 1983 NCAA Division I-A football season.

== Offensive selections ==
=== Receivers ===
- Dwayne Dixon, Florida (AP-1, UPI)
- Eric Martin, LSU (AP-1)
- Joey Jones, Alabama (AP-2)

=== Tight ends ===
- Chuck Scott, Vanderbilt (AP-1, UPI)
- Clarence Kay, Georgia (AP-2)

=== Tackles ===
- Guy McIntyre, Georgia (AP-1, UPI)
- Pat Arrington, Auburn (AP-1, UPI)
- Lomas Brown, Florida (AP-2)
- Winford Hood, Georgia (AP-2)

=== Guards ===
- David Jordan, Auburn (AP-1, UPI)
- Mike Adcock, Alabama (AP-1)
- Bill Mayo, Tennessee (AP-2, UPI)
- John Hunt, Florida (AP-2)

=== Centers ===
- Glenn Streno, Tennessee (AP-2, UPI)

=== Quarterbacks ===
- Walter Lewis, Alabama (AP-1, UPI)
- Wayne Peace, Florida (AP-2)

=== Running backs ===
- Bo Jackson, Auburn (AP-1, UPI)
- Johnnie Jones, Tennessee (AP-1, UPI)
- Ricky Moore, Alabama (AP-1, UPI)
- Lionel James, Auburn (AP-2)
- Neal Anderson, Florida (AP-2)
- Ricky Edwards, Vanderbilt (AP-2)

== Defensive selections ==
=== Ends ===
- Freddie Gilbert, Georgia (AP-1, UPI)
- Reggie White, Tennessee (AP-1, UPI)
- Steve Bearden, Vanderbilt (AP-1)
- Gerald Robinson, Auburn (AP-2)
- Emanuel King, Alabama (AP-2)

=== Tackles ===
- Doug Smith, Auburn (AP-1, UPI)
- Donnie Humphrey, Auburn (AP-2, UPI)
- Andre Townsend, Ole Miss (AP-2)

=== Middle guards ===
- Dowe Aughtman, Auburn (AP-1, UPI)
- Tim Newton, Florida (AP-2)

=== Linebackers ===
- Wilber Marshall, Florida (AP-1, UPI)
- Billy Jackson, Miss. St. (AP-1, UPI)
- Tommy Thurson, Georgia (AP-2, UPI)
- Gregg Carr, Auburn (AP-1)
- Knox Culpepper, Georgia (AP-2)
- Alvin Toles, Tennessee (AP-2)

=== Backs ===
- Terry Hoage, Georgia (AP-1, UPI)
- Leonard Coleman, Vanderbilt (AP-1, UPI)
- David King, Auburn (AP-2, UPI)
- Tony Lilly, Florida (AP-1)
- Kerry Baird, Kentucky (AP-2)
- Liffort Hobley, LSU (AP-2)

== Special teams ==
=== Kicker ===
- Kevin Butler, Georgia (AP-1, UPI)
- Van Tiffin, Alabama (AP-2)

=== Punter ===
- Paul Calhoun, Kentucky (AP-1)
- Ricky Anderson, Vanderbilt (UPI)
- Ray Criswell, Florida (AP-2)

== Key ==
AP = Associated Press

UPI = United Press International

Bold = Consensus first-team selection by both AP and UPI

== See also ==
- 1983 College Football All-America Team
