= List of Florida Gators football All-Americans =

This list of Florida Gators football All-Americans includes those members of the Florida Gators football team who have received All-American honors from one or more selector organizations. The Florida Gators represent the University of Florida in the sport of American football, and they compete in the Football Bowl Subdivision (FBS) of the National Collegiate Athletic Association (NCAA) and the Eastern Division of the Southeastern Conference (SEC).

Several selector organizations release annual lists of their All-America teams after each college football season, honoring the best players at each position. Selector organizations include football analysts, television networks, publications, media wire services, sports writers' associations, and coaches' associations. Traditionally, several of the selectors have recognized two or more tiers of All-Americans, referred to as the first team, second team, third team and honorable mentions.

The NCAA currently recognizes the All-America teams of five selector organizations to determine "consensus All-Americans" and "unanimous All-Americans" in college football. The NCAA compiles consensus All-Americans using a point system based on the All-America teams from the five selector organizations. The point system consists of three points for a first-team selection, two points for a second-team selection, and one point for a third-team selection; no points are awarded for honorable mention selections. Since 1993, the NCAA-recognized selectors have included the American Football Coaches Association (AFCA), the Associated Press (AP), the Football Writers Association of America (FWAA), The Sporting News (SN), and the Walter Camp Football Foundation (WCFF), but the number of selectors used by the NCAA has varied over time, and has included different organizations in the past. The players receiving the most points at each position are recognized as consensus All-Americans; in order for a player to receive unanimous All-American recognition, he must be a first-team selection by all of the NCAA-recognized selector organizations.

Since the Florida Gators football team played its first season in 1906, eighty-nine Gators football players have received one or more selections as first-team All-Americans. Included among these players are thirty-three consensus All-Americans, of which eight were also unanimous All-Americans. The first Florida player to be recognized as a first-team All-American was end Dale Van Sickel, a member of the great Gators eleven of 1928. Florida's first consensus All-American was quarterback Steve Spurrier, who was the winner of the Heisman Trophy in 1966.

== Key ==
^{†}	Consensus selection
^{‡}	Unanimous selection

=== Selectors ===
AFCA	American Football Coaches Association	AP	Associated Press	CBS	CBS Sports	CW	Collier's Weekly
CNNSI	CNN/Sports Illustrated	CP	Central Press Association	ESPN	ESPN	FN	Football News
FWAA	Football Writers Association of America	NBC	NBC Sports	NEA	Newspaper Enterprise Association	PFW	Pro Football Weekly
PS	Phil Steele	Rivals	Rivals.com	Scout	Scout.com	SH	Scripps Howard
SN	The Sporting News	SI	Sports Illustrated	Time	Time magazine	UPI	United Press International
WCFF	Walter Camp Football Foundation						

== Selections ==
Year	Name	Position	Selectors	Sources
1928	Clyde Crabtree	HB	AP-3, NEA-3, UP-3	
1928	William McRae	G	UP-2	
1928	Jimmy Steele	T	NEA-2, AP-HM	
1928	Dale Van Sickel	End	AP-1, NEA-1, CW-1, UP-HM	
1929	Dale Van Sickel	End	CP-2, AP-HM, UP-HM	
1930	Red Bethea	HB	CP-2, AP-HM	
1941	Forest K. Ferguson	End	CW-HM	
1952	Charlie LaPradd	T	AP-1	
1953	Joe D'Agostino	T	UP-3, NEA-HM	
1956	John Barrow	G	FWAA-1	
1958	Vel Heckman	T	FWAA-1, UPI-2, AP-3	
1964	Larry Dupree	HB	AFCA-1	
1964	Dennis Murphy	T	FN	
1965	Bruce Bennett	Back	UPI-1, NEA-2	
1965	Charles Casey	End	AFCA-1, AP-1, NEA-2	
1965	Larry Gagner	OG	FN, NBC, NEA-HM	
1965	Lynn Matthews	DE	NEA-1	
1965	Steve Spurrier	QB	FWAA-1, AP-2, NEA-HM	
1966	Bill Carr	C	SN, Time, CP-2, NEA-HM	
1966	Steve Spurrier‡	QB	AFCA-1, AP-1, CP-1, FWAA-1, NEA-1, UPI-1, FN, NBC, SN-1, Time, WCFF-1	
1968	Guy Dennis	OG	UPI-1, WCFF-1	
1968	Larry Smith	RB	FN, SN	
1969	Carlos Alvarez†	End	AFCA-1, NEA-1, UPI-1, FN, WCFF-1, AP-3	
1969	Steve Tannen	Back	Time, SN, UPI-2, NEA-HM	
1970	Jack Youngblood	DE	FWAA-1, WCFF-1, CP, SN, Time, PFW, FN, AP-2	
1971	John Reaves	QB	Time	
1974	Glenn Cameron	LB	AP-3	
1974	Burton Lawless	OG	NEA	
1974	Ralph Ortega	LB	SN, Time	
1975	Jimmy DuBose	RB	AP-2	
1975	Sammy Green†	LB	AP-1, FWAA-1, NEA	
1976	Wes Chandler	WR	FN, NEA-1, AP-3	
1977	Wes Chandler	WR	UPI, NEA, SN, FN, AP-2	
1980	Cris Collinsworth	WR	NEA, AP-2	
1980	David Little†	LB	AP-1, FWAA-1, FN	
1981	David Galloway	DE	FWAA-1, AP-3	
1982	Wilber Marshall†	LB	AP-1, FWAA-1	
1983	Wilber Marshall†	LB	AFCA-1, AP-1, WCFF-1, UPI, FN, NEA	
1984	Lomas Brown†	OT	AFCA-1, AP-1, FWAA-1, WCFF-1, SN, NEA	
1984	Phil Bromley	C	AP-2	
1984	Alonzo Johnson	LB	SN, AP-3	
1984	Tim Newton	DL	AP-2	
1985	Alonzo Johnson	LB	FN, SH, SN, AP-3	
1985	Jeff Zimmerman	OG	WCFF-1, FN, SN, AP-3	
1986	Adrian White	S	UPI-2, AP-HM	
1986	Jeff Zimmerman	OG	WCFF-1, SH, AP-HM	
1987	Clifford Charlton	LB	SN	
1987	Louis Oliver	DB	SN, AP-3	
1987	Jarvis Williams	DB	WCFF-1	
1988	Trace Armstrong	DE	SN	
1988	Louis Oliver†	DB	AFCA-1, AP-1, WCFF-1, SH	
1989	Emmitt Smith‡	RB	AFCA-1, AP-1, FWAA-1, UPI-1, WCFF-1, FN, SH, SN	
1990	Kirk Kirkpatrick	TE	AP-2	
1990	Huey Richardson	DE	AP-1, FN	
1990	Will White	DB	FWAA-1, AP-3	
1991	Brad Culpepper†	DL	AFCA-1, AP-1, NEA, SH, SN, FN	
1991	Cal Dixon	C	AP-2	
1991	Hesham Ismail	OG	AP-3	
1991	Shane Matthews	QB	AP-3	
1993	Judd Davis	K	UPI, AP-3	
1993	William Gaines	DL	AP-3	
1993	Errict Rhett	RB	FN	
1994	Kevin Carter†	DL	WCFF-1, FN, SN, SN, AP-2	
1994	Jack Jackson†	WR	AFCA-1, AP-1, FWAA-1, UPI, FN, SH, SN	
1994	Ellis Johnson	DL	SH	
1994	Jason Odom	OL	AP-3	
1995	Chris Doering	WR	AP-2	
1995	Jason Odom‡	OL	AFCA-1, AP-1, FWAA-1, UPI-1, WCFF-1, SN, FN	
1995	Danny Wuerffel	QB	FN, AP-2	
1996	Reidel Anthony†	WR	AP-1, FWAA-1, SN	
1996	Ike Hilliard†	WR	AFCA-1, WCFF-1, FN, AP-3	
1996	Jeff Mitchell	C	AP-3	
1996	Danny Wuerffel†	QB	AFCA-1, AP-1, WCFF-1, SN, FN	
1997	Ed Chester	DL	AP-3	
1997	Jacquez Green†	WR	AP-1, FWAA-1, WCFF-1	
1997	Fred Taylor	RB	AP-3	
1997	Fred Weary†	DB	AFCA-1, WCFF-1, SN, FN, AP-2	
1998	Ed Chester	DL	AP-2	
1998	Jevon Kearse	DE	WCFF-1, FN, AP-2	
1998	Travis McGriff	WR	AP-3	
1998	Mike Peterson	DE	SN, AP-2	
1999	Alex Brown	DE	WCFF-1, FN, AP-2	
1999	Jeff Chandler	K	AP-2	
2000	Alex Brown	DE	WCFF-2	
2000	Jabar Gaffney	WR	AP-3	
2000	Lito Sheppard	CB	FWAA-1, CNNSI, AP-2	
2000	Kenyatta Walker	OT	PFW, AP-2, WCFF-2	
2000	Gerard Warren	DT	PFW	
2001	Alex Brown†	DL	WCFF-1, FWAA-1, AP-1, CNNSI	
2001	Andra Davis	LB	CNNSI, SN-2, AP-3	
2001	Jabar Gaffney‡	WR	AFCA-1, AP-1, FWAA-1, SN, WCFF-1, FN, CNNSI	
2001	Rex Grossman†	QB	AP-1, WCFF-1, CNNSI, FN	
2001	Mike Pearson†	OL	FWAA-1, AP-1, SN	
2001	Lito Sheppard	DB	AP-2	
2003	Keiwan Ratliff†	DB	AP-1, FWAA-1, WCFF-1, SN, PFW, SI, ESPN, Rivals	
2003	Shannon Snell	OG	SN	
2003	Ben Troupe	TE	AP-2	
2004	Channing Crowder	LB	ESPN	
2006	Jarvis Moss	DE	PFW	
2006	Reggie Nelson†	DB	AP-1, FWAA-1, WCFF-1, SN, SI, ESPN, CBS-1, CFN, Rivals, Scout	
2006	Brandon Siler	LB	AP-3	
2006	Ryan Smith	DB	AP-2	
2007	Percy Harvin	WR	SN	
2007	Tim Tebow†	QB	AP-1, FWAA-1, WCFF-1, SN, SI, ESPN, CBS-1, CFN, Rivals, Scout	
2008	Percy Harvin	KR / All-purpose	AFCA-1, Rivals, AP-2, WCFF-2	
2008	Brandon James†	KR / All-purpose	FWAA-1, SN, CBS-1, Rivals	
2008	Brandon Spikes‡	LB	AFCA-1, AP-1, FWAA-1, SN, WCFF-1, CBS-1, CFN, ESPN, Rivals, SI	
2008	Tim Tebow	QB	CFN, AP-3	
2009	Joe Haden‡	DB	AFCA-1, AP-1, FWAA-1, SN-1, WCFF-1, SI, PFW, ESPN-1, CBS-1, CFN, Rivals, Scout	
2009	Aaron Hernandez	TE	AP-1, SN-1, ESPN-1, CFN, Rivals, Scout	
2009	Maurkice Pouncey†	C	FWAA-1, SN-1, WCFF-1, PFW, ESPN-1, CBS-1, CFN, Rivals, Scout, AP-2	
2009	Mike Pouncey	OG	PFW, AP-2	
2009	Brandon Spikes†	LB	SN-1, WCFF-1, Scout, AP-2, CBS-2	
2009	Tim Tebow	QB	AP-2, WCFF-2	
2010	Ahmad Black	S	CBS-1, CFN, Rivals, AP-2, PFW-HM	
2010	Chas Henry†	P	AP-1, SN-1, WCFF-1, CBS-1, CFN, ESPN-1, Rivals, Scout, SI, PFW-HM	
2010	Mike Pouncey	C	PFW-1	
2011	Caleb Sturgis	K	AP-2, CBS-2, PFW-HM	
2012	Kyle Christy	P	Scout-1, WCFF-2, AP-3, CBS-3, PFW-HM, SI-HM	
2012	Matt Elam	DB	AP-1, SN-1, CBS-1, Scout-1, SI-1, WCFF-2	
2012	Sharrif Floyd	DL	SN-1, AP-3	
2012	Caleb Sturgis	K	SN-1, CBS-2, AP-3, SI-HM	
2014	Vernon Hargreaves III	DB	ESPN-1, TSN-1, CBS-1	
2015	Antonio Callaway	KR / All-purpose	CBS-1	
2015	Jonathan Bullard	DL	CBS-1, PS-4	
2015	Marcus Maye	S	USAT-1	
2015	Vernon Hargreaves III ‡	DB	AP-1, WCFF-1, FWAA-1, TSN-1, AFCA-1, CBS-1	
2016	Jarrad Davis	LB	PS-3	
2016	Teez Tabor	CB	PS-2	
2016	Johnny Townsend	P	CBS-1	
2017	Johnny Townsend	P	SI-1, PS-4	
2017	Eddy Piñeiro	K	PS-4	
2019	Jonathan Greenard	LB	CBS-1, PS-4	
2019	CJ Henderson	CB	FWAA-2, PS-2	
2020	Kyle Pitts ‡	TE	AP-1, WCFF-1, FWAA-1, TSN-1, AFCA-1, CBS-1, ESPN-1, PS-1	
2020	Kyle Trask	QB	AP-2, CBS-1, SN-2, PS-3	
2020	Kadarius Toney	WR	AP-2	
2022	O'Cyrus Torrence†	OG	AP-1, WCFF-1, FWAA-2, SN-1, AFCA-1, CBS-1, ESPN-1	

== See also ==
- Florida Gators
- History of the University of Florida
- List of Florida Gators in the NFL draft
- List of Florida Gators head football coaches
- List of University of Florida Athletic Hall of Fame members
- University Athletic Association

== Bibliography ==
- 2012 Florida Gators Football Media Guide, University Athletic Association, Gainesville, Florida (2012).
- 2012 NCAA Football Records Book, Award Winners, National Collegiate Athletic Association, Indianapolis, Indiana (2012).
- Carlson, Norm, University of Florida Football Vault: The History of the Florida Gators, Whitman Publishing, LLC, Atlanta, Georgia (2007). ISBN 0-7948-2298-3.
- Golenbock, Peter, Go Gators! An Oral History of Florida's Pursuit of Gridiron Glory, Legends Publishing, LLC, St. Petersburg, Florida (2002). ISBN 0-9650782-1-3.
- Hairston, Jack, Tales from the Gator Swamp: A Collection of the Greatest Gator Stories Ever Told, Sports Publishing, LLC, Champaign, Illinois (2002). ISBN 1-58261-514-4.
- Kabat, Ric A., "Before the Seminoles: Football at Florida State College, 1902–1904," Florida Historical Quarterly, vol. LXX, no. 1 (July 1991).
- MacCambridge, Michael, ed., ESPN College Football Encyclopedia: The Complete History of the Game, ESPN, New York, New York (2005). ISBN 978-1401337032.
- McCarthy, Kevin M., Fightin' Gators: A History of University of Florida Football, Arcadia Publishing, Mount Pleasant, South Carolina (2000). ISBN 978-0-7385-0559-6.
- McEwen, Tom, The Gators: A Story of Florida Football, The Strode Publishers, Huntsville, Alabama (1974). ISBN 0-87397-025-X.
- Nash, Noel, ed., The Gainesville Sun Presents The Greatest Moments in Florida Gators Football, Sports Publishing, Inc., Champaign, Illinois (1998). ISBN 1-57167-196-X.
- Proctor, Samuel, & Wright Langley, Gator History: A Pictorial History of the University of Florida, South Star Publishing Company, Gainesville, Florida (1986). ISBN 0-938637-00-2.
