= 1984 All-America college football team =

Official list of the best college football players of 1984

The 1984 All-America college football team is composed of college football players who were selected as All-Americans by various organizations and writers that chose College Football All-America Teams in 1984. The National Collegiate Athletic Association (NCAA) recognizes five selectors as "official" for the 1984 season. They are: (1) the American Football Coaches Association (AFCA); (2) the Associated Press (AP) selected based on the votes of sports writers at AP newspapers; (3) the Football Writers Association of America (FWAA); (4) the United Press International (UPI) selected based on the votes of sports writers at UPI newspapers; and (5) the Walter Camp Football Foundation (WC). Other selectors included Football News (FN), Gannett News Service (GNS), the Newspaper Enterprise Association (NEA), and The Sporting News (TSN).

== Consensus All-Americans ==
The following charts identify the NCAA-recognized consensus All-Americans for the year 1984 and displays which first-team designations they received.

=== Offense ===
Name	Position	School	Number	Official	Other
Keith Byars	Running back	Ohio State	5/4/9	AFCA, AP, FWAA, UPI, WC	FN, GNS, NEA, TSN
Doug Flutie	Quarterback	Boston College	5/4/9	AFCA, AP, FWAA, UPI, WC	FN, GNS, NEA, TSN
Bill Fralic	Offensive tackle	Pittsburgh	5/4/9	AFCA, AP, FWAA, UPI, WC	FN, GNS, NEA, TSN
Kenneth Davis	Running back	TCU	5/4/9	AFCA, AP, FWAA, UPI, WC	FN, GNS, NEA, TSN
David Williams	Wide receiver	Illinois	5/4/9	AFCA, AP, FWAA, UPI, WC	FN, GNS, NEA, TSN
Mark Traynowicz	Center	Nebraska	5/3/8	AFCA, AP, FWAA, UPI, WC	FN, GNS, NEA
Lomas Brown	Offensive tackle	Florida	4/2/6	AFCA, AP, FWAA, WC	NEA, TSN
Del Wilkes	Offensive guard	South Carolina	3/0/3	AFCA, AP, WC	-
Bill Mayo	Offensive guard	Tennessee	2/1/3	UPI, WC	FN
Eddie Brown	Wide receiver	Miami (Fla.)	2/1/3	AFCA, AP	NEA
Jay Novacek	Tight end	Wyoming	2/1/3	AFCA, UPI	NEA
Jim Lachey	Offensive guard	Ohio State	2/1/3	FWAA, UPI	GNS
Rueben Mayes	Running back	Washington State	2/0/2	FWAA, UPI	-
Dan Lynch	Offensive guard	Washington State	2/3/5	AP, FWAA	FN, GNS, NEA

=== Defense ===
Name	Position	School	Number	Official	Other
Jerry Gray	Defensive back	Texas	5/4/9	AFCA, AP, FWAA, UPI, WC	FN, GNS, NEA, TSN
Jack Del Rio	Linebacker	USC	4/2/6	AFCA, AP, FWAA, WC	FN, NEA
Bruce Smith	Defensive end	Virginia Tech	4/2/6	AFCA, AP, FWAA, WC	GNS, NEA
Ron Holmes	Defensive end	Washington	4/2/6	AFCA, FWAA, UPI, WC	FN, NEA
Gregg Carr	Linebacker	Auburn	4/1/5	AFCA, AP, UPI, WC	FN
Tony Degrate	Defensive tackle	Texas	4/1/5	AFCA, FWAA, UPI, WC	FN
Tony Thurman	Defensive back	Boston College	4/1/5	AFCA, AP, UPI, WC	GNS
Larry Station	Linebacker	Iowa	4/0/4	AFCA, AP, UPI, WC	-
Tony Casillas	Defensive tackle	Oklahoma	3/3/6	AFCA, AP, FWAA	GNS, NEA, TSN
Jeff Sanchez	Defensive back	Georgia	3/0/3	AFCA, UPI, WC	-
David Fulcher	Defensive back	Arizona State	2/4/6	AP, FWAA	FN, GNS, NEA, TSN
Rod Brown	Defensive back	Oklahoma State	2/0/2	AFCA, WC	-

=== Special teams ===
Name	Position	School	Number	Official	Other
Ricky Anderson	Punter	Vanderbilt	5/2/7	AFCA, AP, FWAA, UPI, WC	FN, NEA
Kevin Butler	Kicker	Georgia	4/2/6	AFCA, FWAA, UPI, WC	FN, NEA

== Offense ==
=== Receivers ===
- David Williams, Illinois (CFHOF) (AFCA, AP-1, FWAA, UPI-1, WC, FN-1, GNS, NEA-1, TSN)
- Eddie Brown, Miami (Fla.) (AFCA, AP-1, UPI-2, NEA-1)
- Jerry Rice, Miss. Valley State (CFHOF) (FWAA, GNS, NEA-1, TSN)
- Tracy Henderson, Iowa State (AP-2, FN-1, NEA-2)
- Gerard Phelan, Boston College (AP-2)
- Reggie Bynum, Oregon State (NEA-2)
- James Maness, TCU (AP-3)
- Larry Ray Willis, Fresno State (AP-3)

=== Tight ends ===
- Jay Novacek, Wyoming (CFHOF) (AFCA, UPI-1, NEA)
- Rob Bennett, West Virginia (WC)
- Mark Bavaro, Notre Dame (AP-1)
- Carl Hilton, Houston (TSN)
- Jon Hayes, Iowa (GNS)
- Willie Smith, Miami (AP-2)
- Keli McGregor, Colorado State (UPI-2, NEA-2)
- Alan Andrews, Rutgers (AP-3)

=== Tackles ===
- Bill Fralic, Pittsburgh (CFHOF) (AFCA, AP-1, FWAA, UPI-1, WC, FN-1, GNS, NEA-1, TSN)
- Lomas Brown, Florida (CFHOF) (AFCA, AP-1, FWAA, UPI-2, WC, NEA-1, TSN)
- Ken Ruettgers, USC (GNS)
- Brian Jozwiak, West Virginia (AP-2)
- Jim Juriga, Illinois (UPI-2)
- Daren Gilbert, Cal State Fullerton (NEA-2)
- John Clay, Missouri (AP-3)
- Jeff Dellenbach, Wisconsin (AP-3)

=== Guards ===
- Dan Lynch, Washington State (AP-1, FN-1, GNS, NEA-1)
- Jim Lachey, Ohio State (FWAA, UPI-1, GNS, NEA-2)
- Del Wilkes, South Carolina (AFCA, AP-1, UPI-2, WC)
- Bill Mayo, Tennessee (AP-3, UPI-1, WC, FN-1)
- Lance Smith, LSU (AFCA, AP-2 [OT], UPI-1 [OT], FN-1 [OT], NEA-2 [OT])
- Carlton Walker, Utah (AP-2, FWAA, NEA-1)
- Andrew Campbell, SMU (NEA-2, TSN)
- Harry Grimminger, Nebraska (AP-2, TSN)
- Larry Williams, Notre Dame (AP-3, UPI-2)

=== Centers ===
- Mark Traynowicz, Nebraska (AFCA, AP-1, FWAA, UPI-1, WC, FN-1, GNS, NEA-1)
- Kevin Glover, Maryland (GNS, TSN)
- Trevor Matich, BYU (AP-3, GNS)
- Brent Martin, Stanford (GNS)
- Mike Kelley, Notre Dame (GNS)
- Phil Bromley, Florida (AP-2)
- Kirk Lowdermilk, Ohio State (UPI-2)
- Gene Chilton, Texas (NEA-2)

=== Quarterbacks ===
- Doug Flutie, Boston College (CFHOF) (AFCA, AP-1, FWAA, UPI-1, WC, FN-1, GNS, NEA-1, TSN)
- Bernie Kosar, Miami (AP-2, NEA-2)
- Robbie Bosco, BYU (AP-3, UPI-2)

=== Running backs ===
- Keith Byars, Ohio State (CFHOF) (AFCA, AP-1, FWAA, UPI-1, WC, FN-1, GNS, NEA-1, TSN)
- Kenneth Davis, TCU (AFCA, AP-1, FWAA, UPI-1, WC, FN-1, GNS, NEA-1, TSN)
- Rueben Mayes, Washington State (CFHOF) (AP-2, FWAA, UPI-1)
- Greg Allen, Florida State (AP-3, UPI-2, WC, FN-1, NEA-2)
- Johnnie Jones, Tennessee (AP-2)
- Curtis Adams, Central Michigan (UPI-2)
- Ethan Horton, North Carolina (AP-3, UPI-2)
- Dalton Hilliard, LSU (NEA-2)

== Defense ==
=== Defensive ends ===
- Ron Holmes, Washington (AFCA, AP-2, FWAA, UPI-1 [DT], WC, FN-1, NEA-1)
- Bruce Smith, Virginia Tech (CFHOF) (AFCA, AP-1, FWAA, UPI-2 [DT], WC, GNS, NEA-1)
- Tim Green, Syracuse (CFHOF) (AP-3 [DT], GNS, TSN)
- Leslie O'Neal, Oklahoma State (CFHOF) (AP-1, UPI-2 [DT], GNS, NEA-2 [DT], TSN)
- Freddie Joe Nunn, Mississippi (Ole Miss) (UPI-1, FN-1)
- Mike Gann, Notre Dame (UPI-2)
- Garin Veris, Stanford (UPI-2)

=== Defensive tackles ===
- Tony Casillas, Oklahoma (CFHOF) (AFCA, AP-1 [MG], FWAA, UPI-2 [MG], GNS, NEA-1, TSN)
- Tony Degrate, Texas (AFCA, AP-2, FWAA, UPI-1, WC, FN-1, NEA-2)
- Ray Childress, Texas A&M (CFHOF) (AP-3, UPI-1 [DE], TSN)

=== Middle guards ===
- William Perry, Clemson (AP-3, UPI-1, WC, FN-1, GNS, NEA-2)
- Tim Newton, Florida (AP-2)

=== Linebackers ===
- Jack Del Rio, USC (AFCA [DL], AP-1, FWAA, WC, FN-1, NEA-1)
- Larry Station, Iowa (CFHOF) (AFCA, AP-1, UPI-1, WC, NEA-2)
- Gregg Carr, Auburn (AFCA, AP-1, UPI-1, WC, FN-1, NEA-2)
- Duane Bickett, USC (AP-3, FWAA, UPI-1, NEA-1, TSN)
- James Seawright, South Carolina (AP-1, FWAA, UPI-2, NEA-1)
- Cornelius Bennett, Alabama (CFHOF) (FN-1, GNS, TSN)
- Alonzo Johnson, Florida (AP-3, UPI-2, TSN)
- Marc Munford, Nebraska (GNS)
- Eric Wilson, Maryland (AP-2, FN-1, NEA-1)
- Brian Bosworth, Oklahoma (CFHOF) (AP-2)
- Knox Culpepper, Georgia (AP-2)
- Willie Pless, Kansas (AP-2)
- Tim Meamber, Washington (AP-3, UPI-2, NEA-2)
- Fred Smalls, West Virginia (NEA-2)
- John Offerdahl, Western Michigan (AP-3)

=== Defensive backs ===
- Jerry Gray, Texas (CFHOF) (AFCA, AP-1, FWAA, UPI-1, WC, FN-1, GNS, NEA-1, TSN)
- Tony Thurman, Boston College (AFCA, AP-1, UPI-1, WC, GNS)
- David Fulcher, Arizona State (CFHOF) (AP-1, FWAA, FN-1, GNS, NEA-1, TSN)
- Jeff Sanchez, Georgia (AFCA, AP-2, UPI-1, WC)
- Rod Brown, Oklahoma State (AFCA, AP-2, UPI-2, WC)
- Richard Johnson, Wisconsin (FWAA, NEA-1, TSN)
- Bret Clark, Nebraska (AP-2, FWAA, UPI-2, FN-1, NEA-2, TSN)
- Kyle Morrell, BYU (AP-1, NEA-2)
- Lester Lyles, Virginia (AP-3, GNS)
- Issiac Holt, Alcorn State (NEA-1)
- Anthony Young, Temple (AP-2)
- Sean Thomas, TCU (UPI-2)
- Don Anderson, Purdue (NEA-2)
- John Hendy, Long Beach State (NEA-2)
- Jim Bowman, Central Michigan (AP-3)
- Paul Calhoun, Kentucky (AP-3)
- Nate Harris, Tulsa (AP-3)

== Special teams ==
=== Kickers ===
- Kevin Butler, Georgia (CFHOF) (AFCA, AP-2, FWAA, UPI-1, WC, FN-1, NEA-1)
- John Lee, UCLA (AP-1, UPI-2, GNS, NEA-2, TSN)
- Donald Igwebuike, Clemson (AP-3)

=== Punters ===
- Ricky Anderson, Vanderbilt (AFCA, AP-1, FWAA, UPI-1, WC, FN-1, NEA-1)
- Randall Cunningham, UNLV (CFHOF) (AP-2, UPI-2, TSN)
- Dale Hatcher, Clemson (GNS)
- Tom Tupa, Ohio State (AP-3, NEA-2)

=== Returners ===
- Willie Drewrey, West Virginia (TSN)

== Key ==
- **Bold** – Consensus All-American
- -1 – First-team selection
- -2 – Second-team selection
- -3 – Third-team selection
- CFHOF = College Football Hall of Fame inductee

=== Official selectors ===
- AFCA – American Football Coaches Association (AFCA), selected by the members of the AFCA for the Kodak All-America team
- AP – Associated Press
- FWAA – Football Writers Association of America
- UPI – United Press International
- WC – Walter Camp Football Foundation

=== Other selectors ===
- FN – Football News
- GNS – Gannett News Service
- NEA – Newspaper Enterprise Association
- TSN – The Sporting News

== See also ==
- 1984 All-Atlantic Coast Conference football team
- 1984 All-Big Eight Conference football team
- 1984 All-Big Ten Conference football team
- 1984 All-Pacific-10 Conference football team
- 1984 All-SEC football team
