= Walter Lewis (gridiron football) =

American gridiron football player (born 1962)

No. 10
- Position: Quarterback

Personal information
- Born: April 26, 1962 (age 64); Brewton, Alabama, U.S.

Career information
- College: Alabama
- Supplemental draft: 1984: 3rd round, 70th overall pick

Career history
- Memphis Showboats (1984–1985); Montreal Alouettes (1986)

Awards and highlights
- Second-team All-American (1983); First-team All-SEC (1983)

Walter Lewis (born April 26, 1962) is an American former professional football player who was a quarterback in the United States Football League (USFL) and the Canadian Football League (CFL).

Lewis played college football at Alabama, where he was the first African American quarterback to start for the Crimson Tide and legendary Hall of Fame coach Bear Bryant. He was also the last quarterback to start for Bryant. He played in 44 games from 1980 to 1983, passing for 4,257 yards with 29 touchdowns. He was named first team quarterback on the 1983 All-SEC football team, and was also selected by Football News as a second-team All-American.

Lewis was drafted in the third round of the 1984 Supplemental Draft by the New England Patriots, but never played in the NFL

Playing for the Memphis Showboats of the USFL, Lewis split time with Mike Kelley both seasons. In 1984, he completed 161 of 276 passes (58%) for 1,862 yards, 15 touchdowns, and 10 interceptions, and also ran 60 times for 552 yards and 5 touchdowns. In 1985, Lewis completed 97 of 184 (53%) for 1,593 yards, 16 touchdowns and 5 interceptions, and also rushed 65 times for 591 yards and 4 touchdowns.

Lewis spent the 1986 season with the Montreal Alouettes of the CFL.
