= 1984 All-SEC football team =

American college football all-star team

The 1984 All-SEC football team consists of American football players selected to the All-Southeastern Conference (SEC) chosen by various selectors for the 1984 NCAA Division I-A football season. Florida won the conference, though it was later vacated.

== Offensive selections ==
=== Receivers ===
- Chuck Scott, Vanderbilt (AP-1, UPI)
- Eric Martin, LSU (AP-2, UPI)
- Tim McGee, Tennessee (AP-2)

=== Tight ends ===
- Jim Popp, Vanderbilt (AP-1)
- Jeff Parks, Auburn (AP-2)

=== Tackles ===
- Lomas Brown, Florida (AP-1, UPI)
- Lance Smith, LSU (AP-1, UPI)
- Rob Monaco, Vanderbilt (AP-2)
- Crawford Ker, Florida (AP-2)

=== Guards ===
- Bill Mayo, Tennessee (AP-1, UPI)
- Jeff Lott, Auburn (AP-1)
- Jeff Zimmerman, Florida (AP-2)
- Danny Sanders, Miss. St. (AP-2)
- Peter Anderson, Georgia (AP-2)

=== Centers ===
- Phil Bromley, Florida (AP-1, UPI)
- Wes Neighbors, Alabama (AP-2)

=== Quarterbacks ===
- Tony Robinson, Tennessee (AP-1)
- Kurt Page, Vanderbilt (UPI)
- Kerwin Bell, Florida (AP-2)

=== Running backs ===
- Johnnie Jones, Tennessee (AP-1, UPI)
- Dalton Hilliard, LSU (AP-1, UPI)
- George Adams, Kentucky (AP-1, UPI)
- Neal Anderson, Florida (AP-2)
- John L. Williams, Florida (AP-2)

== Defensive selections ==
=== Ends ===
- Gerald Robinson, Auburn (AP-1, UPI)
- Freddie Joe Nunn, Ole Miss (AP-1, UPI)
- Tim Newton, Florida (UPI)
- Michael Brooks, LSU (AP-2)
- Kenny Sims, Georgia (AP-2)

=== Tackles ===
- Jon Hand, Alabama (AP-1, UPI)
- Pat Swoopes, Miss. St. (AP-2, UPI)
- Ben Thomas, Auburn (AP-1)
- Karl Jordan, Vanderbilt (AP-2)

=== Linebackers ===
- Gregg Carr, Auburn (AP-1, UPI)
- Alonzo Johnson, Florida (AP-1, UPI)
- Knox Culpepper, Georgia (AP-1, UPI)
- Cornelius Bennett, Alabama (AP-1)
- Shawn Burks, LSU (AP-2)
- Cam Jacobs, Kentucky (AP-2)
- Aaron Pearson, Miss. St. (AP-2)

=== Backs ===
- Jeff Sanchez, Georgia (AP-1, UPI)
- Paul Calhoun, Kentucky (AP-1, UPI)
- Liffort Hobley, LSU (AP-1, UPI)
- David King, Auburn (AP-2, UPI)
- Manuel Young, Vanderbilt (AP-2)
- Jeffery Dale, LSU (AP-2)

== Special teams ==
=== Kicker ===
- Kevin Butler, Georgia (AP-1, UPI)
- Fuad Reveiz, Tennessee (AP-2)

=== Punter ===
- Ricky Anderson, Vanderbilt (AP-1, UPI)
- Bill Smith, Ole Miss (AP-2)

== Key ==
AP = Associated Press

UPI = United Press International

Bold = Consensus first-team selection by both AP and UPI

== See also ==
- 1984 College Football All-America Team
