= Winston Chapman =

American football player (born 1992)

Profile
- Position: Long snapper

Personal information
- Born: April 15, 1992 (age 34); Fairhope, Alabama, U.S.
- Listed height: 6 ft 2 in (1.88 m)
- Listed weight: 225 lb (102 kg)

Career information
- High school: Fairhope (AL)
- College: Mississippi State
- NFL draft: 2016: undrafted

Career history
- Miami Dolphins (2017)*
- * Offseason or practice squad member only
- Stats at Pro Football Reference

Winston Chapman (born April 15, 1992) is an American former football long snapper. He played college football for the Mississippi State Bulldogs.

== College career ==
Chapman attended Mississippi State University.

== Professional career ==
On February 22, 2017, Chapman was signed by the Miami Dolphins. He was waived on September 2, 2017.
