= Jeffrey Sanchez =

Jeffrey or Jeff Sanchez may refer to:

- Jeffrey Sanchez (politician) (born 1969), American politician
- Jeffrey Sanchez (jockey) (born 1985), Puerto Rican jockey
- Jeff Sanchez (defensive back, born 1962), American football player
- Jeff Sanchez (defensive back, born 1981), American football player
