= Doug Smith (defensive lineman) =

American football player (1960–2024)

No. 97, 99
- Position: Nose tackle

Personal information
- Born: June 13, 1960; Bayboro, North Carolina, U.S.
- Died: July 25, 2024 (aged 64); Rosharon, Texas, U.S.
- Listed height: 6 ft 4 in (1.93 m)
- Listed weight: 294 lb (133 kg)

Career information
- High school: Pamlico (Bayboro)
- College: Auburn
- NFL draft: 1984: 2nd round, 29th overall pick

Career history
- Birmingham Stallions (1985); Houston Oilers (1985–1992)

Awards and highlights
- Second-team All-American (1983); 2× First-team All-SEC (1982, 1983)

Career NFL statistics
- Sacks: 14
- Fumble recoveries: 5
- Interceptions: 1
- Stats at Pro Football Reference

Arthur Douglas Smith (June 13, 1960 – July 25, 2024) was an American professional football player who was a nose tackle in the United States Football League (USFL) and National Football League (NFL).

Born and raised in Bayboro, North Carolina, Smith played scholastically at Pamlico High School. He played college football for the Auburn Tigers, and, as a senior, was honored by the both Football News and the Newspaper Enterprise Association (NEA) as a second-team All-American.

Smith was selected by the Houston Oilers in the second round (29th overall pick) of the 1984 NFL draft, but chose to sign with the Birmingham Stallions of the United States Football League (USFL) after he could not come to a contract agreement with the Oilers. Smith signed after the USFL season, which ran from February - July, so did not play in 1984. He started in 17 games for the Stallions in 1985, recording five sacks and one fumble recovery. When the USFL ceased operations following the 1985 season, Smith joined the Oilers. He spent eight seasons with the Oilers, appearing in 100 games, logging 14 career sacks and 5 fumble recoveries.

Smith died in Rosharon, Texas, on July 25, 2024, at the age of 64.
