= Lance Smith (American football) =

American football player (born 1963)

No. 61
- Position: Guard

Personal information
- Born: January 1, 1963 (age 63); New York, New York, U.S.
- Listed height: 6 ft 3 in (1.91 m)
- Listed weight: 283 lb (128 kg)

Career information
- High school: A.L. Brown (Kannapolis, North Carolina)
- College: LSU
- NFL draft: 1985: 3rd round, 72nd overall pick

Career history
- St. Louis/Phoenix Cardinals (1985–1993); New York Giants (1994–1996)

Awards and highlights
- First-team All-American (1984); 2× First-team All-SEC (1982, 1984)

Career NFL statistics
- Games played: 182
- Games started: 165
- Fumble recoveries: 7
- Stats at Pro Football Reference

Lance Smith (born January 1, 1963) is an American former professional football player who was an offensive lineman for 12 seasons in the National Football League (NFL).

Smith was born in New York City and played scholastically at A.L. Brown High School in Kannapolis, North Carolina. He played college football at Louisiana State University, where, as a senior, he was honored as a first-team All-American by AFCA and UPI.

Smith was selected by the St. Louis Cardinals in the third-round of the 1985 NFL draft. He spent nine years with the Cardinals, followed by three seasons with the New York Giants.
