= 1984 All-Big Eight Conference football team =

American all-star college football team

The 1984 All-Big Eight Conference football team consists of American football players chosen by various organizations for All-Big Eight Conference teams for the 1984 NCAA Division I-A football season. The selectors for the 1984 season included the Associated Press (AP) and United Press International (UPI).

== Offensive selections ==
=== Quarterbacks ===
- Danny Bradley, Oklahoma (AP-1; UPI-1)
- Rusty Hilger, Oklahoma State (AP-2; UPI-2)

=== Running backs ===
- Jeff Smith, Nebraska (AP-1; UPI-1)
- Doug DuBose, Nebraska (AP-1; UPI-1)
- Shawn Jones, Oklahoma State (AP-2)
- Steve Sewell, Oklahoma (AP-2)
- Lee Rouson, Colorado (UPI-2)
- Lynn Williams, Kansas (UPI-2)

=== Tight ends ===
- Jon Embree, Colorado (AP-1; UPI-1)
- Tony Davis, Missouri (AP-2)
- Dave Smoldt, Iowa State (UPI-2)

=== Wide receivers ===
- Tracy Henderson, Iowa State (AP-1; UPI-1)
- George Shorthose, Missouri (AP-1; UPI-2)
- Ron Brown, Colorado (AP-2; UPI-1)
- Skip Peete, Kansas (AP-2; UPI-2)

=== Centers ===
- Mark Traynowicz, Nebraska (AP-1; UPI-1)
- Chuck Thomas, Oklahoma (AP-2; UPI-2)

=== Down linemen ===
- Harry Grimminger, Nebraska (AP-1; UPI-1)
- Mark Behning, Nebraska (AP-1; UPI-1)
- John Clay, Missouri (AP-1; UPI-1)
- Paul Blair, Oklahoma State (AP-1; UPI-2)
- Damian Johnson, Kansas State (AP-2; UPI-2)
- Ralph Partida, Oklahoma State (AP-2; UPI-1)
- Junior Ili, Colorado (AP-2)
- Brent Burks, Oklahoma (AP-2)
- Eric Pope, Oklahoma (UPI-2)
- Doug Certain, Kansas (UPI-2)

== Defensive selections ==
=== Defensive ends ===
- Scott Strasburger, Nebraska (AP-1; UPI-1)
- Bill Weber, Nebraska (AP-1; UPI-2)
- Darrell Reed, Oklahoma (AP-2; UPI-1)
- Lester Williams, Iowa State (AP-2; UPI-2)

=== Nose guard ===
- Tony Casillas, Oklahoma (AP-1; UPI-1)
- John Washington, Oklahoma State (AP-2; UPI-2)

=== Defensive tackles ===
- Leslie O'Neal, Oklahoma State (AP-1; UPI-1)
- Rodney Harding, Oklahoma State (AP-1; UPI-1)
- Rob Stuckey, Nebraska (AP-2)
- Steve Little, Iowa State (AP-2)
- George Smith, Colorado (UPI-2)
- Phil Forte, Kansas (UPI-2)

=== Linebackers ===
- Brian Bosworth, Oklahoma (AP-1; UPI-1)
- Willie Pless, Kansas (AP-1; UPI-1)
- Matt Manger, Oklahoma State (AP-1; UPI-2)
- Jeff Brasswell, Iowa State (AP-2; UPI-2)
- Marc Munford, Nebraska (AP-2)
- Mark Daum, Nebraska (AP-2)

=== Defensive backs ===
- Barton Hundley, Kansas State (AP-1; UPI-1)
- Bret Clark, Nebraska (AP-1; UPI-1)
- Rod Brown, Oklahoma State (AP-1; UPI-1)
- Mark Moore, Oklahoma State (AP-2; UPI-1)
- Adam Hinds, Oklahoma State (AP-2; UPI-2)
- Anthony Mayze, Iowa State (AP-2; UPI-2)
- David Burke, Nebraska (UPI-2)
- Brad Lambert, Kansas State (UPI-2)

== Special teams ==
=== Place-kicker ===
- Larry Roach, Oklahoma State (AP-1; UPI-1)
- Dodge Schwartzburg, Kansas (AP-2; UPI-2)

=== Punter ===
- Scott Livingston, Nebraska (AP-1; UPI-1)
- Mike Winchester, Oklahoma (AP-2)
- Marlon Adler, Missouri (UPI-2)

== Key ==
AP = Associated Press

UPI = United Press International

== See also ==
- 1984 College Football All-America Team
