= Alonzo Johnson =

American football player (1963–2024)

No. 54
- Position: Linebacker

Personal information
- Born: April 4, 1963; Panama City, Florida, U.S.
- Died: February 1, 2024 (aged 60); Bay County, Florida, U.S.
- Listed height: 6 ft 3 in (1.91 m)
- Listed weight: 222 lb (101 kg)

Career information
- High school: Rutherford (Panama City)
- College: Florida
- NFL draft: 1986: 2nd round, 48th overall pick

Career history
- Philadelphia Eagles (1986–1987)

Awards and highlights
- 2× First-team All-American (1984, 1985); 2× First-team All-SEC (1984, 1985); Second-team Florida Gators All-Century Team; Florida's All-Time Team; University of Florida Athletic Hall of Fame

Career NFL statistics
- Games played: 18
- Games started: 9
- Sacks: 1
- Interceptions: 3
- Stats at Pro Football Reference

Alonzo Al Johnson (April 4, 1963 – February 1, 2024) was an American professional football player who was a linebacker for two seasons with the Philadelphia Eagles of the National Football League (NFL) during the 1980s. Johnson played college football for the Florida Gators, and was recognized twice as a first-team All-American. He was selected in the second round of the 1986 NFL draft.

== Early life ==
Alonzo Al Johnson was born in Panama City, Florida. He attended Rutherford High School in Panama City, where he was a standout high school football player for the Rutherford Rams.

== College career ==
Johnson accepted an athletic scholarship to attend the University of Florida in Gainesville, Florida, where he played for coach Charley Pell and coach Galen Hall's Florida Gators football teams from 1982 to 1985. Johnson was a key member of the Gators' defense in 1984 and 1985 when the Gators posted identical 9–1–1 overall win–loss records and led the Southeastern Conference (SEC) with best-in-the-conference records of 5–0–1 and 5–1, respectively. He was a first-team All-SEC selection and a first-team All-American in 1984 and 1985, and also a team captain both years. He finished his four-year college career with 335 tackles, 55 tackles for a loss and 27 quarterback sacks.

Johnson was later voted to the Florida Gators' All-Century Team and All-Time Team, and inducted into the University of Florida Athletic Hall of Fame as a "Gator Great." In 2006, he was ranked as No. 35 among the top 100 Gators of the first century of Florida football by the sportswriters of The Gainesville Sun.

== Professional career ==
Johnson was selected by the Philadelphia Eagles in the second round (48th overall) of the 1986 NFL draft. He played for the Eagles from 1986 to 1987. As a rookie, he played in fifteen games and started nine of them at rightside linebacker, with three interceptions. He left the Eagles before the beginning of the 1987 season in order to enter a drug rehabilitation program, and subsequently only played in three games for the Eagles in 1987. He was placed on the non-football injury list in December 1987, and did not play again.

== Death ==
Johnson died in Bay County, Florida, on February 1, 2024, at the age of 60.

== See also ==
- 1984 College Football All-America Team
- 1985 College Football All-America Team
- Florida Gators football, 1980–89
- List of Florida Gators football All-Americans
- University of Florida Athletic Hall of Fame
- List of Florida Gators in the NFL draft
- List of Philadelphia Eagles players
