= Jones High School (Orlando, Florida) =

Location
- 801 S Rio Grande Avenue; Orlando, Florida 32805; United States; 28.532999°N 81.401163°W

Information
- Founded: 1895
- School district: Orange County Public Schools
- CEEB code: 101295
- Principal: Orlando Norwood
- Teaching staff: 69.00 (FTE)
- Grades: 9–12
- Student to teacher ratio: 23.96
- Campus type: Urban
- Slogan: Paving Our Way to an "A"
- Athletics: Football; Basketball (Boys & Girls); Baseball; Softball; Soccer (Boys & Girls); Bowling; Golf; Wrestling(Boys & Girls); Weightlifting (Boys & Girls); Flag Football (Girls); Cross Country (Boys & Girls); Track & Field (Boys & Girls); Volleyball (Boys & Girls) Lacrosse (Girls)
- Mascot: Tiger
- Rival: Maynard Evans High School; Oak Ridge High School
- Newspaper: Tiger Roar
- Yearbook: Tiger Paw
- Website: joneshs.ocps.net

Jones High School is located in the Parramore/Lorna Doone neighborhood in the urban heart of Orlando, Florida, United States. It is a public school in Orange County Public Schools. The school mascot is the Tiger, and the colors are orange and green.

In May 2008, Newsweek named Jones to its annual America's Top Public High Schools list.

== History ==
The first public school for African Americans in Orlando was formed in 1895 and housed in a building on the corner of Garland Avenue and Church Street. The school was renamed Johnson Academy for principal Lymus Johnson and moved to a new building on the corner of Parramore Avenue and Jefferson Street. In 1921, a brick Colonial Revival building was constructed on the corner of Parramore Avenue and Washington Street at a cost of $34,000. In 1931 the school's first 12th grade class graduated.

The school was renamed for the final time in honor of L. C. Jones, a longtime school principal and donor of the property.

It was a member of the Florida Interscholastic Athletic Association.

In 1952, the school moved west of downtown to its current location on Rio Grande Avenue. In 1988, as part of a schoolwide project, Jones entered the Guinness Book of World Records for creating the World's Largest Box of Popcorn. Aided by a propane-powered air popper designed by engineering students from the University of Central Florida, Jones students popped 3,787.5 cubic feet (107.25 m^{3}) of popcorn. Orville Redenbacher, whose company donated the unpopped corn, mentioned the feat during a broadcast of the now-defunct Pat Sajak Show.

A new campus consisting of a two-story academic building, separate buildings for science, technology, and music, an administrative building, cafeteria, gymnasium, media center, and dedicated historical museum was constructed during the period 2001–2004. During construction, students attended classes in portables across the street from the campus. The new campus was opened for the start of the 2004–2005 school year.

== Academics ==
Jones High School is an International Baccalaureate World School, offering the Diploma Programme for juniors and seniors and the Middle Years Programme for freshmen and sophomores in articulation with Memorial Middle School.

Jones High students may also enroll in its Medical Arts Magnet Program or in an advanced studies program of multiple Advanced Placement (AP) courses. AP Courses offered include Art History, Biology, Calculus (AB), Chemistry, English Language and Composition, English Literature and Composition, European History, French Language, Human Geography, Music Theory, Macroeconomics, Microeconomics, Psychology, Spanish Language, Statistics, Studio Art, United States Government and Politics, United States History, and World History.

Selected students who show academic promise who are also among the first in their families to go to college are invited to participate in the Advancement Via Individual Determination (AVID) Program.

== Extracurriculars ==
The Marching Tiger Band is well known throughout the Central Florida area. They marched in the 1976 United States Bicentennial Parade in Washington, DC, 2003 Macy's Thanksgiving Day Parade, prior to Macy's they also marched at the 2002 Boscov's Thanksgiving Day Parade in Philadelphia. The band also performed at WrestleMania XXIV, playing John Cena's entrance theme music "The Time Is Now". In 2016 the Marching Band performed in a parade in Washington DC, and were told that they could participate any year that they wanted to . In 2018 the Wind ensemble and the choir went to New York and performed at Carnegie Hall and received a standing ovation there told that they were welcomed back at any time.

== Athletics ==
Jones High's varsity sports teams include baseball, basketball, bowling, cross country, flag football (girls), football, golf, soccer, softball, track and field, volleyball, wrestling, and weightlifting.

The Jones High boys basketball team won the Florida 3A state championship in 2006 under Coach Jerry Howard. The girls basketball team has won two Florida state championships, in 2004 under Coach Jimmy Mincy, and in 1997 under Coach Kelvin Harris.

== Notable alumni ==
- Evan Anderson, NFL player
- Sevyn Banks, former Ohio State and LSU cornerback
- David L. Brewer III, former Superintendent, Los Angeles Unified School District
- Ernie Calloway, NFL player
- Vernell Brown III, college football wide receiver for the Florida Gators
- Jerry Demings, Mayor, Orange County; Former Chief Of Police; City Of Orlando, Former Sheriff; Orange County,
- Yusuf Estes, former National Muslim Chaplain for the United States Bureau of Prisons
- Sylvester James Gates, PhD, noted theoretical physicist
- Jaye Howard, NFL player
- Benny Johnson, NFL player
- Kerby Joseph, NFL player
- P. J. Jules, NFL player
- Kevin Lewis, former New York Giants linebacker
- Bernard Morris, former Marshall University quarterback
- Nate Newton, former pro football player
- Tim Newton, former pro football player
- Ernest Page, former mayor of Orlando
- Belvin Perry, Chief Judge, Ninth Judicial Circuit Court of Florida (Orange/Osceola)
- Eric Powell, NFL player
- Phillip Riley, former NFL player
- Vince Sanders, Chicago radio personality; former V.P. National Black Network; co-founder NABJ
- Wesley Snipes, film actor
- Max Starks, former pro football player
- Dylan Wade, college football tight end for the UCF Knights
- Kermit Whitfield, NFL football player, Cincinnati Bengals, 2014 Florida State University national championship team
- Jarvis Williams, football player
- Leroy Williams, baseball player
- Shavonte Zellous, 2009 WNBA All-Rookie Team, Detroit Shock

== See also ==
- List of high schools in Florida
- Orange County Public Schools

== Sources ==
- http://www.greatschools.net/modperl/browse_school/fl/2096
- https://web.archive.org/web/20081201142545/http://www.cfhf.net/orlando/1921.htm
