= Ricky Anderson (American football) =

American football player (born 1963)

No. 96
- Positions: Punter, placekicker

Personal information
- Born: January 24, 1963 (age 63); St. Petersburg, Florida, U.S.
- Listed height: 6 ft 2 in (1.88 m)
- Listed weight: 195 lb (88 kg)

Career information
- High school: Lakewood (St. Petersburg)
- College: Vanderbilt (1981–1984)
- NFL draft: 1985: 11th round, 298th overall pick

Career history
- St. Louis Cardinals (1985)*; Cincinnati Bengals (1986)*; Seattle Seahawks (1987)*; Atlanta Falcons (1987)
- * Offseason or practice squad member only

Awards and highlights
- Unanimous All-American (1984); 2× First-team All-SEC (1983, 1984)

Richard Paul Anderson (born January 24, 1963) is an American former football punter who played college football at Vanderbilt University. He was a unanimous All-American in 1984 as a punter. He was selected by the St. Louis Cardinals in the eleventh round of the 1985 NFL draft.

== Early life ==
Richard Paul Anderson was born on January 24, 1963, in St. Petersburg, Florida. He attended Lakewood High School in St. Petersburg.

== College career ==
Anderson played college football for the Vanderbilt Commodores of Vanderbilt University. He joined the team as a walk-on and was a four-year letterman from 1981 to 1984. He played both punter and placekicker for the Commodores. In 1982, he converted 14 of 22 field goals and 31 of 31 extra points. Anderson punted 53 times for 2,274 yards in 1983 while converting 10 of 16 field goals and 19 of 20 extra points, earning United Press International (UPI) first-team All-SEC honors at punter. As a senior in 1984, he recorded 58 punts for 2,793 yards, 16 of 19 field goals, and 22 of 24 extra points, garnering Associated Press and UPI first-team All-SEC recognition. He was a unanimous All-American in 1984 as a punter.

== Professional career ==
Anderson was selected by the St. Louis Cardinals in the 11th round, with the 298th overall pick, of the 1985 NFL draft. He was released on September 2, 1985.

Anderson signed with the Cincinnati Bengals on February 13, 1986, and was later released on August 25, 1986.

Anderson was signed by the Seattle Seahawks in 1987. He was cut by the Seahawks on August 3, 1987.

Anderson signed with the Atlanta Falcons during the 1987 NFL players strike. However, he did not play in any games and was released in early October 1987.
