= Dowe Aughtman =

American football player (born 1961)

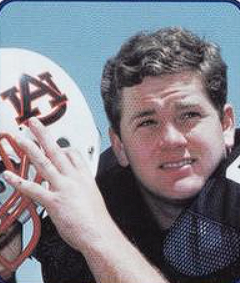

No. 76
- Position: Guard

Personal information
- Born: January 28, 1961 (age 65); Brewton, Alabama, U.S.
- Listed height: 6 ft 2 in (1.88 m)
- Listed weight: 260 lb (118 kg)

Career information
- High school: T. R. Miller (Brewton)
- College: Auburn
- NFL draft: 1984: 11th round, 304th overall pick

Career history
- Dallas Cowboys (1984–1985)

Awards and highlights
- 2× First-team All-SEC (1982, 1983)

Career NFL statistics
- Games played: 7
- Stats at Pro Football Reference

Lorenzo Dowe Aughtman (born January 28, 1961) is an American former professional football player who was a defensive tackle for the Dallas Cowboys of the National Football League (NFL). He played college football for the Auburn Tigers.

== Early life ==
Aughtman attended T. R. Miller High School. He accepted a football scholarship from Auburn University.

He was a linebacker until Pat Dye was hired as the new Auburn head coach in 1981. The coaching staff considered converting him into a nose guard or an offensive guard, until deciding to move him to the defensive line. He became a starter as a sophomore. The next year he made 75 tackles (9 for loss).

In 1983, he was a co-captain, while contributed to the team finishing with an 11–1 record and winning its first Southeastern Conference championship since 1957. He recorded a career-high 85 tackles (third on the team), including 7 for loss. He tied his career-high of 11 tackles against the University of Texas and the University of Maryland. He was a two-time All-SEC selection.

== Professional career ==
Aughtman was selected by the Dallas Cowboys in the eleventh round (304th overall) of the 1984 NFL draft. He was also selected by the Birmingham Stallions in the 1984 USFL Territorial Draft. Because of injuries to the offensive line, like Blaine Nye, John Fitzgerald, Pat Donovan and Kurt Petersen before him, he was switched to the offensive line to play offensive guard in September. He appeared in 7 games, playing on special teams.

In 1985, he injured his shoulder in training camp and was placed on the injured reserve list. He was waived on August 18, 1986.
