= Freddie Gilbert =

American football player (born 1962)

No. 90, 93
- Positions: Defensive end, defensive tackle

Personal information
- Born: April 8, 1962 (age 64); Griffin, Georgia, U.S.
- Listed height: 6 ft 4 in (1.93 m)
- Listed weight: 275 lb (125 kg)

Career information
- High school: Griffin
- College: Georgia
- Supplemental draft: 1984: 1st round, 19th overall pick

Career history
- New Jersey Generals (1984–1985); Denver Broncos (1986–1988); Phoenix Cardinals (1989)

Awards and highlights
- First-team All-American (1983); 2× First-team All-SEC (1982, 1983)
- Stats at Pro Football Reference

Freddie Gene Gilbert (born April 8, 1962) is an American former professional football player who was a defensive end in the United States Football League (USFL) and National Football League (NFL).

Born and raised in Griffin, Georgia, Gilbert attended Griffin High School, and then went on to play college football for the Georgia Bulldogs. As a senior, he was honored by United Press International (UPI) as a first-team All-American.

Gilbert was selected by the Broncos in the first round of the 1984 Supplemental draft, but opted to play his first two years professionally with the New Jersey Generals of the USFL. He joined the Broncos for the 1986 season and played in Super Bowl XXI and Super Bowl XXII. Gilbert recorded 6.5 sacks while with the Generals and 5.0 with the Broncos.

Gilbert finished his career with the Phoenix Cardinals in 1989.

He resides in Athens, Georgia.
