= Leroy Williams (baseball) =

American baseball player

- Infielder
- Born: July 10, 1927; Orlando, Florida, U.S.
- Died: July 23, 1994 (aged 67); Orlando, Florida, U.S.
- Batted: Both Threw: Right

debut
- 1947, for the Newark Eagles

Last appearance
- 1948, for the Newark Eagles

Career statistics
- Batting average: .183
- Home runs: 1
- Runs batted in: 15

Teams
- Newark Eagles (1947–1948)

Norldon Leroy Williams (July 10, 1927 – July 23, 1994), nicknamed "Jeff", was an American Negro league infielder in the 1940s.

A native of Orlando, Florida, Williams attended Jones High School in Orlando. He made his Negro leagues debut in 1947 for the Newark Eagles, and played for Newark again in 1948. Williams went on to play in the minor leagues for the Syracuse Chiefs and Tulsa Oilers, and finished his career with the Orlando Flyers in 1958. He died in Orlando in 1994 at age 67.
