= Jeff Zimmerman (American football) =

American football player (born 1965)

No. 76
- Position: Guard Tackle

Personal information
- Born: January 10, 1965 (age 61); Enid, Oklahoma, U.S.
- Listed height: 6 ft 3 in (1.91 m)
- Listed weight: 320 lb (145 kg)

Career information
- High school: Maynard Evans (Orlando, Florida)
- College: Florida
- NFL draft: 1987: 3rd round, 68th overall pick

Career history
- Dallas Cowboys (1987–1990)

Awards and highlights
- 2× First-team All-American (1985, 1986); First-team All-SEC (1985); 2× Second-team All-SEC (1984, 1986)

Career NFL statistics
- Games played: 34
- Games started: 2
- Stats at Pro Football Reference

Jeffrey Alan Zimmerman (January 10, 1965 - March 1, 2024) is an American former professional football player who was an offensive lineman for four seasons with the Dallas Cowboys of the National Football League (NFL) during the late 1980s and early 1990s. He played college football for the Florida Gators, twice earning first-team All-American honors. The Cowboys selected him in the third round of the 1987 NFL draft. In 1990, Zimmerman was named to the All-Madden Team.

== Early life ==
Zimmerman was born in Enid, Oklahoma in 1963. He attended Maynard Evans High School in Orlando, Florida, where he played as an offensive tackle and was named high school All-American in 1982.

== College career ==
He accepted a football scholarship to attend the University of Florida in Gainesville, Florida, where he played for coach Charley Pell and coach Galen Hall's Florida Gators football teams from 1983 to 1986.

As a freshman, he was a backup at guard behind John Hunt. The next year, he became the starter a right guard.

In 1985, although he lost two weeks due to a right knee injury he suffered against Rutgers University, he became the first Gators lineman to be named to an All-American team as an underclassman.

He was nicknamed "One Man Gang" by his teammates and was a two-year starter at right guard, until his senior season when he was moved to right tackle. He excelled at pass protection, despite suffering a pulled groin in mid-season.

Zimmerman was one of the members of the Gators' outstanding offensive line of the mid-1980s known as the "Great Wall of Florida," which included Phil Bromley, Lomas Brown, Billy Hinson and Crawford Ker. Behind their blocking, the Gators' quarterback Kerwin Bell, fullback John L. Williams and halfback Neal Anderson led the Gators to identical 9–1–1 overall win–loss records and best-in-the-SEC records of 5–0–1 and 5–1 in 1984 and 1985, respectively.

== Professional career ==
He was selected by the Dallas Cowboys in the third round (68th overall) of the 1987 NFL draft. He was part of a change in the offensive line philosophy, when the team started to value size and strength over speed and athletic ability. Although he was initially projected as a first-round draft choice, the weight problems he displayed as a senior and in the post-season dropped his value.

As a rookie, he was a backup at left guard behind Nate Newton. His only recognition came from knocking All-Pro Lawrence Taylor unconscious during a blitz, in a game against the New York Giants September 20. On October 1, he made his first career start against the Philadelphia Eagles at left guard.

In 1988, a dislocated shoulder he suffered in training camp limited his playing time to one game. He was placed on the injured reserve list on September 23, after re-injuring in the third week of the season.

In 1989, he was able to play in his only full season, becoming a key backup at guard and tackle, on an offensive line that limited opponents to a then franchise record low 30 sacks. On December 16, he lined up at right tackle to make his second NFL start. He also was used as the third tight end in short yardage situations.

In 1990, he started the first 9 weeks of the year on the injured reserve list with a sprained knee injury he suffered in training camp. He was reactivated on November 7. After sitting out the San Francisco game, he saw action in the final six contests of the season as a backup guard. He also was used as the third tight end in short yardage situations.

During the 1991 off-season without any previous notice, he chose not to attend the Cowboys' conditioning program nor training camp, and was placed on the reserve/did not report list. He announced his retirement from pro football at a later time, after the problems he experienced controlling his weight hampered his performance and cut his career short.

== See also ==
- List of Dallas Cowboys players
- List of Florida Gators football All-Americans
- List of Florida Gators in the NFL draft
- List of University of Florida alumni
