= George Shorthose =

American football player (born 1961)

No. 80
- Position: Wide receiver

Personal information
- Born: December 22, 1961 (age 64); Jefferson City, Missouri, U.S.
- Listed height: 6 ft 0 in (1.83 m)
- Listed weight: 198 lb (90 kg)

Career information
- High school: Jefferson City (MO)
- College: Missouri
- NFL draft: 1985: 6th round, 145th overall pick

Career history
- Miami Dolphins (1985); Kansas City Chiefs (1985); Denver Broncos (1987)

Awards and highlights
- First-team All-Big Eight (1984)
- Stats at Pro Football Reference

George Shorthose (born December 22, 1961) is an American former professional football wide receiver. He was selected by the Miami Dolphins in the sixth round of the 1985 NFL draft. He played in three games for the Kansas City Chiefs in 1985.
