= Wilber Marshall =

American football player (born 1962)

No. 58, 55
- Position: Linebacker

Personal information
- Born: April 18, 1962 (age 64); Titusville, Florida, U.S.
- Listed height: 6 ft 1 in (1.85 m)
- Listed weight: 231 lb (105 kg)

Career information
- High school: Astronaut (Titusville)
- College: Florida
- NFL draft: 1984: 1st round, 11th overall pick

Career history
- Chicago Bears (1984–1987); Washington Redskins (1988–1992); Houston Oilers (1993); Arizona Cardinals (1994); New York Jets (1995)

Awards and highlights
- 2x Super Bowl champion (XX, XXVI); 2× First-team All-Pro (1986, 1992); Second-team All-Pro (1991); 3× Pro Bowl (1986-1987, 1992); 100 Greatest Bears of All-Time; 80 Greatest Redskins; 2× Consensus All-American (1982, 1983); 3× First-team All-SEC (1981, 1982, 1983); Florida Football Ring of Honor (2007); University of Florida Athletic Hall of Fame

Career NFL statistics
- Tackles: 1,043
- Sacks: 45
- Forced fumbles: 24
- Fumble recoveries: 16
- Interceptions: 23
- Defensive touchdowns: 4
- Stats at Pro Football Reference
- College Football Hall of Fame

Wilber Buddyhia Marshall (born April 18, 1962) is an American former professional football player who was a linebacker in the National Football League (NFL) for five teams from 1984 until 1995. Marshall played college football for the Florida Gators, was twice recognized as a consensus All-American, and is a member of the College Football Hall of Fame.

He was selected in the first round of the 1984 NFL draft by the Chicago Bears and played in Super Bowl XX. Marshall later was part of the Super Bowl XXVI-winning Washington Redskins team, and also played for the Houston Oilers and Arizona Cardinals before finishing his career with the New York Jets.

== Early life ==
Marshall was born in Titusville, Florida. He attended Astronaut High School in Titusville, where he was a Parade magazine All-American high school football player for the Astronaut War Eagles. Future fellow NFL star Cris Collinsworth played quarterback on Astronaut's football team during Marshall's freshman year. In 2007, twenty-nine years after he graduated from high school, the Florida High School Athletic Association (FHSAA) named Marshall to its "All-Century Team", recognizing him as one of the thirty-three greatest Florida high school football players of the last 100 years.

== College career ==
Marshall accepted an athletic scholarship to attend the University of Florida in Gainesville, Florida, where he was first a tight-end, before becoming a star linebacker for coach Charley Pell's Gators teams from 1980 to 1983. He was the core of a ferocious Gators defense and finished his college career with 343 tackles, fifty-eight tackles for a loss, and twenty-three quarterback sacks. Marshall was a three-time first-team All-Southeastern Conference (SEC) selection (1981, 1982, 1983) and a two-time consensus first-team All-American (1982, 1983). He was a finalist for the Lombardi Award in both 1982 and 1983, and was named "National Defensive Player of the Year" by ABC Sports in 1983. The Gainesville Sun named him a first-team selection to the Gators "Team of the Century" in 1999, as well as the "Defensive Player of the Century." Marshall was inducted into the University of Florida Athletic Hall of Fame as a "Gator Great," and was named to the University of Florida's Ring of Honor in 2007, joining Florida football greats Steve Spurrier, Jack Youngblood, Emmitt Smith and Danny Wuerffel. Marshall was elected to the College Football Hall of Fame in 2008. In one of a series of articles published by The Gainesville Sun in 2006, he was recognized as the No. 4 player among the top 100 all-time Florida Gators.

== Professional career ==
=== Chicago Bears ===
Marshall is perhaps best known as a significant member of two Super Bowl championship teams, the 1985 Bears and the 1991 Redskins. In 1985, the Bears, behind one of the most celebrated defenses in league history, finished the regular season 15–1, shut out both opponents in the playoffs, and beat the New England Patriots 46–10 in Super Bowl XX. In a 37–17 week 16 victory over the Detroit Lions, Marshall delivered a stunning hit on Lions' quarterback Joe Ferguson that left Ferguson flat on his back. But perhaps Marshall's most memorable moment came in the 1985 NFC Championship Game, against the Los Angeles Rams. At the beginning of the fourth quarter, snow began to fall at Soldier Field, eliciting loud applause from the Bears fans in attendance. On the next play, Bears defensive end Richard Dent sacked Rams quarterback Dieter Brock, causing Brock to fumble the football. Marshall picked up the loose football and, alongside William "the Refrigerator" Perry, ran 52 yards through the falling snow. The Bears beat the Rams 24–0, and Marshall's fumble return for a touchdown continues to be the highlight from that game most replayed. Fox News Chicago also named that play to be the most iconic moment of the game, and of the season, as well. He also had a good performance in the Super Bowl, recording a sack and recovering a fumble. In 1986, Marshall recorded five interceptions, 5.5 sacks, and two defensive touchdowns, and was named first-team All-Pro for the first time.

=== Washington Redskins ===
In the spring of 1988, Marshall became the first NFL free agent in eleven years to sign with another team, agreeing to a 5-year, $6 million contract offer to play for the Washington Redskins, the team that had eliminated the Bears from the NFL playoffs in each of the previous two seasons. When the Bears declined to match the offer, the Redskins had to give them their two first-round draft picks in the next two NFL drafts as compensation.

Marshall won another championship ring with the Redskins in the 1991 season, when they beat the Buffalo Bills 37–24 in Super Bowl XXVI, and Marshall finished the game with several tackles and a sack. A week before that, he had a superb performance in the Redskins 41–10 win over the Detroit Lions, sacking Detroit quarterback Erik Kramer three times. During the season, he had 5 interceptions which he returned for 75 return yards. Marshall was named second-team All-Pro following the 1991 season and was named first-team All-Pro for the second time in his career following the 1992 season. In 1993, Marshall reunited with Buddy Ryan, who had been the Bears' defensive coordinator during Marshall's first two seasons, signing a contract to play for the Houston Oilers. When Ryan left the Oilers to become head coach of the Arizona Cardinals in 1994, Marshall joined him there for one season. He then finished his NFL career in 1995 as a member of the New York Jets.

In his twelve NFL seasons, Marshall recorded forty-five sacks and intercepted twenty-three passes, which he returned for 304 yards and three touchdowns. He also forced 24 fumbles and recovered sixteen, returning them for seventy yards and two touchdowns. He is among the few players who have recorded twenty sacks and twenty interceptions in their career.

== Life after football ==
Marshall has spent much of his life after football suffering from injuries he sustained during his professional career. His health has declined as the years progressed, but Marshall has refused to receive surgery to repair his injured spine, shoulder, and knees. Marshall has battled the NFL and the players' union in court over a settlement pertaining to his injuries. Marshall prevailed in his long-pending dispute over his entitlement to total disability benefits from the Bert Bell/Pete Rozelle NFL Player Retirement Plan in 2008. However, by that time, he had filed for bankruptcy due to legal and medical expenses, and he refused to appear at a 25th anniversary tribute for the 1985 Bears team due to disagreements with the McCaskey family over player treatment.

Marshall lived in the Washington DC suburbs after retirement until moving back to his hometown of Titusville, Florida several years later.

== NFL career statistics ==
=== Regular season ===
Year	Team	Games		Tackles				Interceptions			Fumbles		
Year	Team	GP	GS	Cmb	Solo	Ast	Sck	Int	Yds	TD	FF	FR	TD
1984	CHI	15	1	19	–	–	0.0	0	0	0	0	0	0
1985	CHI	16	15	78	–	–	6.0	4	23	0	3	1	0
1986	CHI	16	15	105	–	–	5.5	5	68	1	4	3	1
1987	CHI	12	12	93	–	–	5.0	0	0	0	1	1	0
1988	WAS	16	16	133	–	–	4.0	3	61	0	1	0	0
1989	WAS	16	16	108	–	–	4.0	1	18	0	1	2	0
1990	WAS	16	15	107	–	–	5.0	1	6	0	3	1	0
1991	WAS	16	16	135	–	–	5.5	5	75	1	3	1	0
1992	WAS	16	16	138	–	–	6.0	2	20	1	3	3	0
1993	HOU	10	10	37	–	–	2.0	0	0	0	0	1	0
1994	ARI	15	15	58	42	16	1.0	0	13	0	2	1	0
1995	NYJ	15	6	32	25	7	1.0	2	20	0	1	2	0
Career		179	153	1,043	67	23	45.0	23	304	3	22	16	1

== See also ==
- 1982 College Football All-America Team
- 1983 College Football All-America Team
- Florida Gators football, 1980–89
- List of Chicago Bears first-round draft picks
- List of Chicago Bears players
- List of College Football Hall of Fame inductees (players, A–K)
- List of College Football Hall of Fame inductees (players, L–Z)
- List of Florida Gators football All-Americans
- List of Florida Gators in the NFL draft
- List of New York Jets players
- List of Washington Redskins players
- List of University of Florida Athletic Hall of Fame members
