= Bill Mayo =

American football player (born 1963)

No. 67
- Position: Offensive guard

Personal information
- Born: April 26, 1963 (age 63); Chattanooga, Tennessee, U.S.
- Listed height: 6 ft 3 in (1.91 m)
- Listed weight: 283 lb (128 kg)

Career information
- High school: Dalton (Dalton, Georgia)
- College: Tennessee

Career history
- 1981–1984: Tennessee Volunteers

Awards and highlights
- Consensus All-American (1984); 2× First-team All-SEC (1983, 1984)

Bill Mayo (born April 26, 1963) is an American former college football offensive guard who played for the Tennessee Volunteers. He was a consensus All-American in 1984

== Early life ==
Bill Mayo was born on April 26, 1963, in Chattanooga, Tennessee. He attended Dalton High School in Dalton, Georgia. He earned Academic All-American honors in high school. In 2024, Mayo was an inaugural member of the Dalton High School Athletics Hall of Fame. He was also inducted into the Georgia High School Football Hall of Fame in 2024 as part of the third class.

== College career ==
Mayo played college football for the Tennessee Volunteers of the University of Tennessee from 1981 to 1984. He was a consensus All-American in 1984. Mayo was also named first-team All-SEC in 1983 and 1984. He was a four-year starter at Tennessee, only missing one game and starting 46, which was the most in school history at the time. Mayo played in the Hula Bowl and Senior Bowl after his senior year.

== Professional career ==
Mayo was a territorial selection of the Memphis Showboats in the 1985 USFL draft. He signed with the Green Bay Packers after going undrafted in the 1985 NFL draft. He was cut by the Packers on July 22, 1985.
