= Gerald Robinson (American football) =

American football player (born 1963)

No. 95, 98, 97
- Position: Defensive end

Personal information
- Born: May 4, 1963 (age 63); Tuskegee, Alabama, U.S.
- Listed height: 6 ft 3 in (1.91 m)
- Listed weight: 262 lb (119 kg)

Career information
- High school: Notasulga (AL)
- College: Auburn
- NFL draft: 1986: 1st round, 14th overall pick

Career history
- Minnesota Vikings (1986–1987); San Diego Chargers (1989–1990); Los Angeles Rams (1991–1994)

Awards and highlights
- First-team All-SEC (1984); Second-team All-SEC (1983)

Career NFL statistics
- Tackles: 170
- Sacks: 19
- Forced fumbles: 4
- Stats at Pro Football Reference

Gerald Robinson (born May 4, 1963) is an American former professional football player who was a defensive end in the National Football League (NFL) from 1986 to 1994 for the Minnesota Vikings, the San Diego Chargers and the Los Angeles Rams. He attended the Auburn University and was the Vikings first round draft pick in 1986. He is the all-time sack leader at Auburn University. He now lives in the state of Georgia.
