= Rod Brown (gridiron football) =

American gridiron football player (born 1963)

Profile
- Position: Defensive back

Personal information
- Born: October 6, 1963 (age 63); Gainesville, Texas, U.S.
- Listed height: 6 ft 1 in (1.85 m)
- Listed weight: 195 lb (88 kg)

Career information
- College: Oklahoma State
- NFL draft: 1985: undrafted

Career history
- Denver Broncos (1985)*; Ottawa Rough Riders (1987–1988); Dallas Texans (1993)
- * Offseason or practice squad member only

Awards and highlights
- Consensus All-American (1984); First-team All-Big Eight (1984)
- Stats at ArenaFan.com

Rod Brown (born October 6, 1963) is an American former professional football player who was a defensive back for two seasons with the Ottawa Rough Riders of the Canadian Football League (CFL). He played college football for the Oklahoma State Cowboys, earning consensus All-American honors in 1984. Brown was also a member of the Denver Broncos and Dallas Texans.

== College career ==
Brown played for the Oklahoma State Cowboys from 1981 to 1984. He was a consensus All-American in 1984 after recording fifty tackles, six interceptions, eight pass deflections, one sack and one fumble recovery. He also earned first-team All-Big Eight honors in 1984. Brown was named to the Oklahoma State Football All-Century Team by The Oklahoman in 1999.

== Professional career ==
Brown spent the 1985 off-season with the Denver Broncos and was released by the team on July 25, 1985. He signed with the CFL's Ottawa Rough Riders in April 1987 and played in 32 games for the team from 1987 to 1988. He played for the Dallas Texans of the Arena Football League (AFL) during the 1993 season. Brown was tied for third in the AFL with seven interceptions.
