= Crawford Ker =

American football player (born 1962)

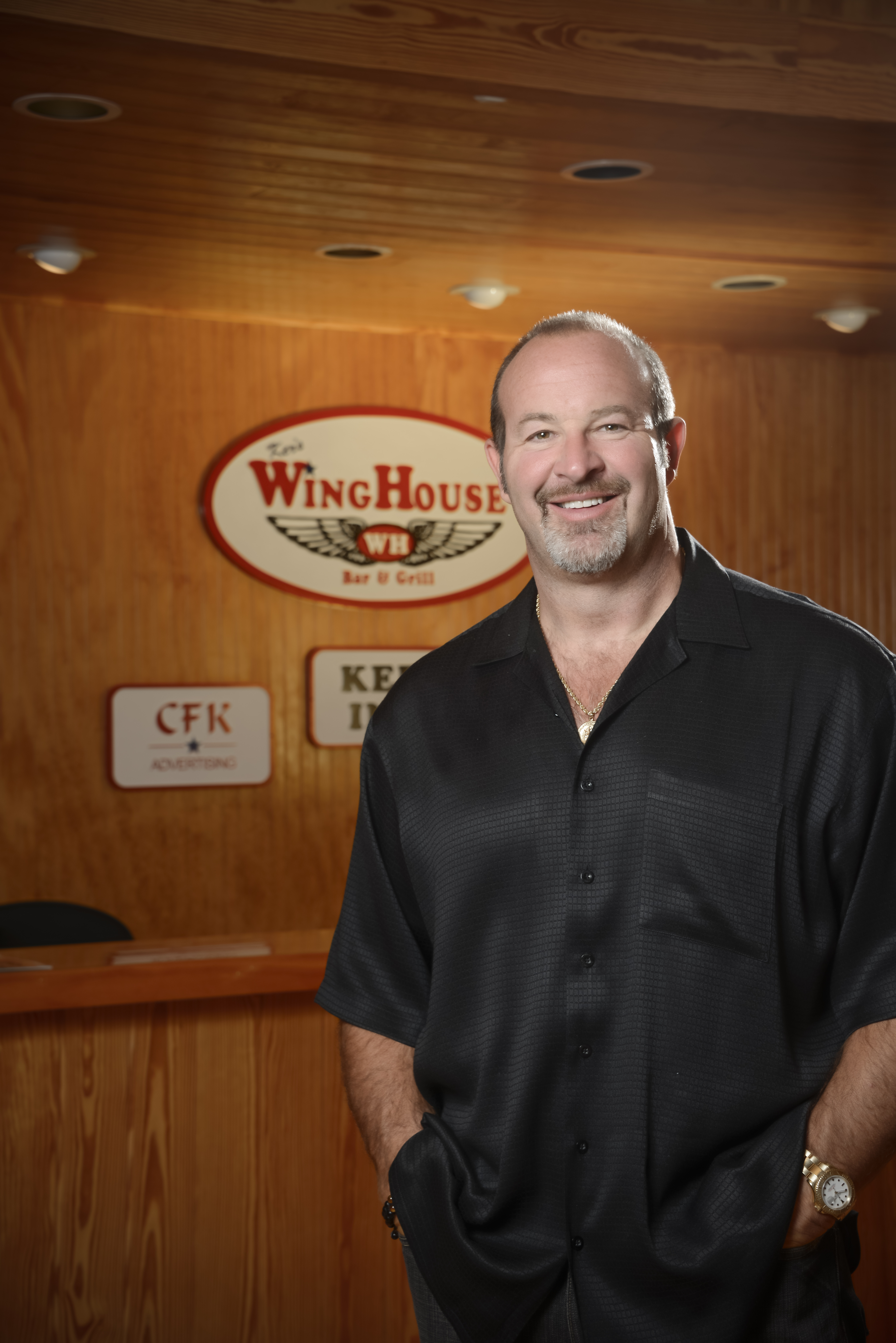
- Ker as CEO of Ker's WingHouse Bar & Grill

No. 68
- Position: Guard

Personal information
- Born: May 5, 1962 (age 64); Philadelphia, Pennsylvania, U.S.
- Listed height: 6 ft 3 in (1.91 m)
- Listed weight: 288 lb (131 kg)

Career information
- High school: Dunedin (FL)
- College: Arizona Western (1981-1982); Florida (1983-1984)
- NFL draft: 1985: 3rd round, 76th overall pick

Career history
- Dallas Cowboys (1985–1990); Denver Broncos (1991); Detroit Lions (1992)*
- * Offseason or practice squad member only

Awards and highlights
- Junior College All-American (1982); Second-team All-SEC (1984)

Career NFL statistics
- Games played: 92
- Game started: 85
- Fumble recoveries: 1
- Stats at Pro Football Reference

Crawford Francis Ker (born May 5, 1962) is an American former professional football player who was a guard in the National Football League (NFL) for the Dallas Cowboys and Denver Broncos. He played college football at the University of Florida.

== Early life ==
Ker was born in Philadelphia, Pennsylvania, and was the only son of George and Anne Ker. His father George immigrated to the United States from Scotland, and had previously served in the British Army as a Buckingham Palace guard. When Ker was young, his family moved to Florida, and his father worked several jobs to support the family in Dunedin, Florida; running a lawn service during the day and working at a convenience store at night. After school, and during weekends and summers, Ker followed his father's steps with his work ethic.

In the mid-1970s, George managed the kitchen at a sports restaurant in Clearwater, Florida, where Ker worked as a busboy while he was in high school. During school semester breaks and vacations, he also waited tables and cooked in the kitchen.

Ker attended Dunedin High School in Dunedin. During his junior year in high school, he decided to become a professional football player. He had not played high school football before his junior year, but he started working out; after beginning high school at 145 pounds, he bulked up to 210.

As a senior, he was named All-Conference and the Dunedin Falcons football team won a Pinellas County championship, but no Division I football programs recruited him to play college football. He graduated in 1980, but he wanted to play at a big school to improve his chances of being drafted in the NFL, so he worked out during the first year after graduation, adding another fifty pounds to his six-foot, four-inch frame.

== College career ==
On the advice of a friend, Ker called the football coach at Arizona Western College who invited him to walk-on to the football team. As a sophomore, he was recognized as a junior college ("JUCO") All-American in 1982.

The Florida Gators football coaches were convinced of Ker's talent and offered him a football scholarship to attend the University of Florida for his last 2 years of eligibility in 1983 and 1984. Ker's nickname among his Gators teammates was "Big Daddy," and he could bench-press up to 515 pounds making him one of the strongest players in college football.

He played two years for coach Charley Pell and coach Galen Hall's Florida Gators football teams. As a senior, he was a starter at right tackle on the Gator's 1984 squad that, at the time, was considered the finest Gators football team ever. The Gators' outstanding offensive line was called "The Great Wall of Florida," and included Ker, Phil Bromley, Lomas Brown, Billy Hinson and Jeff Zimmerman.

Behind the blocking of Ker and his Great Wall teammates, the Gators' quarterback Kerwin Bell, fullback John L. Williams and halfback Neal Anderson led the Gators to a 9–1–1 overall win–loss record and won their first Southeastern Conference (SEC) championship with a conference record of 5–0–1. He was recognized as a second-team All-SEC selection and an honorable mention All-American following the 1984 season.

== Professional career ==
=== Dallas Cowboys ===
Ker was selected by the Dallas Cowboys in the third round (76th overall) of the 1985 NFL draft, as part of a change in the offensive line philosophy, when the team started to value size and strength over speed and athletic ability. He also was selected by the Tampa Bay Bandits in the 1985 USFL Territorial Draft.

He was moved to guard, but only played five games as a 23-year-old rookie, after being placed on the injured reserve list with a back injury on October 23.

In 1986, he was named the starter at right guard after Kurt Petersen suffered a season ending left knee injury early in training camp. In 1990, he was switched to left guard to replace Nate Newton, who was moved to right tackle.

Ker became the Cowboys' highest-paid offensive lineman, and started in eighty-six of the Cowboys' ninety-one regular season games from 1986 to 1990.

=== Denver Broncos ===
On March 27, 1991, he was signed in plan B free agency by the Denver Broncos. He was placed on the injured reserve list during the 1991 pre-season and later started 10 games after being activated. He was waived on July 9, 1992.

=== Detroit Lions ===
On August 20, 1992, he signed with the Detroit Lions. He was released on August 27 and retired.

== See also ==
- Florida Gators
- Florida Gators football, 1980–89
- List of Dallas Cowboys players
- List of Florida Gators in the NFL draft
