= David Jordan (American football) =

American football player (born 1962)

No. 69, 62
- Position: Offensive guard

Personal information
- Born: July 14, 1962 (age 64); Birmingham, Alabama, U.S.
- Listed height: 6 ft 6 in (1.98 m)
- Listed weight: 274 lb (124 kg)

Career information
- High school: Vestavia Hills (Vestavia Hills, Alabama)
- College: Auburn
- NFL draft: 1984: 10th round, 255th overall pick

Career history
- New York Giants (1984–1986); Tampa Bay Buccaneers (1987); Denver Broncos (1988)*; Los Angeles Raiders (1989)*
- * Offseason or practice squad member only

Awards and highlights
- Super Bowl champion (XXI); 2× First-team All-SEC (1982, 1983)
- Stats at Pro Football Reference

David Turner Jordan (born July 14, 1962) is an American former professional football offensive guard who played in the National Football League (NFL) with the New York Giants and Tampa Bay Buccaneers. He played college football for the Auburn Tigers and was selected by the Giants in the tenth round of the 1984 NFL draft.

== Early life ==
David Turner Jordan was born on July 14, 1962, in Birmingham, Alabama. He attended Vestavia Hills High School in Vestavia Hills, Alabama.

== College career ==
Jordan enrolled at Auburn University to play college football for the Tigers. He was a four-year letterman from 1980 to 1983. He was named first-team All-SEC by the Associated Press (AP) in 1982, and first-team All-SEC by the AP and United Press International in 1983.

== Professional career ==
Jordan was selected by the New York Giants in the tenth round, with the 255th overall pick, of the 1984 NFL draft. He signed with the team on June 3, 1984. He played in 30 regular season games, starting one, for the Giants from 1984 to 1985. Jordan also appeared in four playoff games. He spent the entire 1986 season on injured reserve, during which time the Giants won Super Bowl XXI. He was released on September 7, 1987, before the start of the 1987 regular season.

On September 24, 1987, Jordan signed with the Tampa Bay Buccaneers during the 1987 NFL players strike. He started all three strike games for the Buccaneers, and was later released on November 3, 1987.

Jordan was signed by the Denver Broncos on April 5, 1988. He was released on August 23, 1988.

Jordan signed with the Los Angeles Raiders for the 1989 season but was released.

== Personal life ==
Jordan's mother, sister, uncle, aunt, two cousins, and other relatives all attended Auburn.
