= 1982 All-SEC football team =

American college football all-star team

The 1982 All-SEC football team consists of American football players selected to the All-Southeastern Conference (SEC) chosen by various selectors for the 1982 college football season.

== Offensive selections ==
=== Receivers ===
- Willie Gault, Tennessee (AP-1, UPI)

=== Tight ends ===
- Allama Matthews, Vanderbilt (AP-1, UPI)
- Malcolm Scott, LSU (AP-2)

=== Tackles ===
- Joe Beazley, Alabama (AP-1)
- Lance Smith, LSU (AP-1)
- Jimmy Harper, Georgia (UPI)
- Pat Phenix, Ole Miss (AP-2, UPI)
- Pat Arrington, Auburn (AP-2)
- Dan Fike, Florida (AP-2)

=== Guards ===
- Wayne Harris, Miss. St. (AP-1, UPI)
- David Jordan, Auburn (AP-1)
- Steve Mott, Alabama (AP-2, UPI)
- Guy McIntyre, Georgia (AP-2)

=== Centers ===
- Wayne Radloff, Georgia (AP-1, UPI)

=== Quarterbacks ===
- Whit Taylor, Vanderbilt (AP-1, UPI)
- Alan Risher, LSU (AP-2)

=== Running backs ===
- Herschel Walker, Georgia (College Football Hall of Fame) (AP-1, UPI)
- Dalton Hilliard, LSU (AP-1)
- James Jones, Florida (AP-1)
- Bo Jackson, Auburn (College Football Hall of Fame) (AP-2, UPI)
- Danny Knight, Miss. St. (AP-2, UPI)
- Lionel James, Auburn (AP-2)
- Michael Haddix, Miss. St. (AP-2)

== Defensive selections ==
=== Ends ===
- Freddie Gilbert, Georgia (AP-1, UPI)
- Mike Pitts, Alabama (AP-1, UPI)
- Mike Cofer, Tennessee (AP-2)
- Steve Bearden, Vanderbilt (AP-2)

=== Tackles ===
- Ramsey Dardar, LSU (AP-1, UPI)
- Doug Smith, Auburn (AP-1)
- Jimmy Payne, Georgia (UPI)
- Billy Jackson, Miss. St. (UPI)
- Jackie Cline, Alabama (AP-2)
- Andre Townsend, Ole Miss (AP-2)

=== Middle guards ===
- Dowe Aughtman, Auburn (AP-1)

=== Linebackers ===
- Tommy Thurson, Georgia (AP-1, UPI)
- Al Richardson, LSU (AP-1, UPI)
- Wilber Marshall, Florida (AP-1, UPI)
- Gregg Carr, Auburn (AP-2)
- Chris Martin, Auburn (AP-2)

=== Backs ===
- Terry Hoage, Georgia (AP-1, UPI)
- Jeremiah Castille, Alabama (AP-1, UPI)
- Jeff Sanchez, Georgia (AP-1, UPI)
- James Britt, LSU (AP-1)
- Tommy Wilcox, Alabama (AP-2)
- Bob Harris, Auburn (AP-2)
- Manuel Young, Vanderbilt (AP-2)
- Tony Lilly, Florida (AP-2)
- Andy Molls, Kentucky (AP-2)

== Special teams ==
=== Kicker ===
- Fuad Reveiz, Tennessee (AP-1, UPI)
- Kevin Butler, Georgia (AP-2)

=== Punter ===
- Jim Arnold, Vanderbilt (AP-1, UPI)
- Jimmy Colquitt, Tennessee (AP-2)

== Key ==
AP = Associated Press

UPI = United Press International

Bold = Consensus first-team selection by both AP and UPI

== See also ==
- 1982 College Football All-America Team
