= Freddie Joe Nunn =

American football player (1962–2021)

No. 53, 78, 50, 93
- Position: Linebacker

Personal information
- Born: April 9, 1962; Noxubee County, Mississippi, U.S.
- Died: October 16, 2021 (aged 59); Tyler, Texas, U.S.
- Listed height: 6 ft 5 in (1.96 m)
- Listed weight: 262 lb (119 kg)

Career information
- High school: Nanih Waiya School (Winston County, Mississippi)
- College: Ole Miss
- NFL draft: 1985: 1st round, 18th overall pick

Career history
- St. Louis / Phoenix Cardinals (1985–1993); Indianapolis Colts (1994–1996)

Awards and highlights
- First-team All-American (1984); First-team All-SEC (1984)

Career NFL statistics
- Total tackles: 450
- Sacks: 67.5
- Fumble recoveries: 14
- Stats at Pro Football Reference

Freddie Joe Nunn (April 9, 1962 – October 16, 2021) was an American professional football player who was a linebacker in the National Football League (NFL). He spent most of his career with the St.Louis / Phoenix Cardinals and retired as the franchise's all-time sacks leader.

Nunn was born in Noxubee County, Mississippi and played scholastically at Nanih Waiya School in neighboring Winston County. He played collegiately for the Ole Miss Rebels, where, as a senior, he was honored by United Press International (UPI) as a first-team All-American.

Nunn was selected by the St. Louis Cardinals in the first round (18th overall) of the 1985 NFL draft. He started his career as a defensive end and later moved to the linebacker position. He played for the Cardinals organization from 1985 to 1993, and for the Indianapolis Colts from 1994 to 1996. In his career, Nunn played in 157 games and recorded 67.5 sacks.

At the time of his death on October 16, 2021, Nunn's 66.5 sacks as a Cardinal stood as an official franchise record. When Cardinals linebacker Chandler Jones broke that record in a game played only three weeks after Nunn's death, Jones paid tribute to Nunn by revealing a t-shirt worn under his jersey bearing Nunn's name and portrait.
