= Guy McIntyre =

American football player (born 1961)

No. 62
- Position: Guard

Personal information
- Born: February 17, 1961 (age 65); Thomasville, Georgia, U.S.
- Listed height: 6 ft 3 in (1.91 m)
- Listed weight: 275 lb (125 kg)

Career information
- High school: Thomasville
- College: Georgia (1979–1983)
- NFL draft: 1984: 3rd round, 73rd overall pick

Career history
- San Francisco 49ers (1984–1993); Green Bay Packers (1994); Philadelphia Eagles (1995–1996)

Awards and highlights
- 3× Super Bowl champion (XIX, XXIII, XXIV); Second-team All-Pro (1992); 5× Pro Bowl (1989–1993); National champion (1980); Second-team All-American (1983); Jacobs Blocking Trophy (1983); First-team All-SEC (1983); Second-team All-SEC (1982)

Career NFL statistics
- Games played: 186
- Games started: 125
- Fumble recoveries: 5
- Stats at Pro Football Reference

Guy Maurice McIntyre (born February 17, 1961) is an American former professional football player who was a guard in the National Football League (NFL). He played college football for the Georgia Bulldogs and was selected by the San Francisco 49ers in the third round of the 1984 NFL draft. McIntyre played in three Super Bowls and five Pro Bowls with the 49ers.

McIntyre was one of the first linemen in the modern age of the NFL to be used as a blocking fullback in the Bill Walsh's "angus" short-yardage formation; it was when this offense was used in the 1984 NFC Championship Game in the defeat of the Chicago Bears that motivated Bears coach Mike Ditka to use the same formation the following year.

== Early life ==
McIntyre attended Thomasville High School, where he played high school football for the Bulldogs.

== College career ==
McIntyre starred for the Georgia Bulldogs from 1979 to 1983 as an offensive tackle and guard, blocking for legendary RB Herschel Walker from 1980-1982. He was a team captain in 1983 and an SEC champion in 1981 and 1982. The Thomasville native won the Jacobs Blocking Trophy in 1983 voted by SEC coaches. He was named All-SEC in 1982 and 1983 and a second-team All-American in 1983.
