= Skip Peete =

American football coach (born 1963)

Tampa Bay Buccaneers
- Title: Running backs coach

Personal information
- Born: January 30, 1963 (age 63); Phoenix, Arizona, U.S.

Career information
- Position: Wide receiver
- High school: Tucson (AZ) Sahuaro
- College: Kansas

Career history
- Pittsburgh (1988–1989) Graduate assistant; Pittsburgh (1990) Wide receivers coach; Pittsburgh (1991–1992) Running backs coach; Michigan State (1993–1994) Wide receivers coach; Rutgers (1995) Wide receivers coach; UCLA (1996–1997) Running backs coach; Oakland Raiders (1998–2006) Running backs coach; Dallas Cowboys (2007–2012) Running backs coach; Chicago Bears (2013–2014) Running backs coach; Los Angeles Rams (2016–2019) Running backs coach; Dallas Cowboys (2020–2022) Running backs coach; Tampa Bay Buccaneers (2023–present) Running backs coach

Awards and highlights
- Second-team All-Big Eight (1984)

Willie "Skip" Peete (born January 30, 1963) is an American football coach who is the running backs coach for the Tampa Bay Buccaneers of the National Football League (NFL). Prior to the Buccaneers, he coached running backs for the Los Angeles Rams, Chicago Bears, Dallas Cowboys, and Oakland Raiders. He also has experience in college, coaching running backs for two years at UCLA, wide receivers at Michigan State and Rutgers, and both running backs and wide receivers at the University of Pittsburgh.

== Playing career ==
In college, Peete was an All-Big Eight Conference wide receiver in 1985 with the Kansas Jayhawks.

== Coaching career ==
In 1988, Peete began his coaching career when he became a graduate assistant at the University of Pittsburgh. In his final two seasons with Pitt, he coached future Pro Football Hall of Famer Curtis Martin. In his two seasons at Michigan State, he coached Muhsin Muhammad and Derrick Mason, who both went on to have successful NFL careers. During his stay at UCLA, he coached running back Skip Hicks to back-to-back 1,000 yard rushing seasons and 20 plus touchdowns and a Pac-10 record 55 career touchdowns.

=== NFL ===
With the Raiders, Tyrone Wheatley and LaMont Jordan recorded career highs in rushing yards with 1,046 in 2000 and 1,025 in 2005, respectively. During the 2002 Raiders season, Peete coached running back Charlie Garner to 962 yards rushing yards on 182 attempts to go along with 941 yards receiving on 91 catches.

On February 15, 2007, the Dallas Cowboys hired Peete as their running backs coach. In his first year with the Cowboys, Peete helped Marion Barber make his first career Pro Bowl after rushing for career-highs in rushing yards (975) and touchdowns (10). Two years later, Peete guided the Cowboys running game to a franchise-record 4.8 yards per carry.

Peete was subsequently hired by the Chicago Bears, reuniting him with former Raiders offensive coordinator and then-current Bears head coach Marc Trestman. Peete joined the Los Angeles Rams' coaching staff in 2016.

On January 15, 2020, Peete returned to the Cowboys to reprise his previous role of running backs coach. On January 25, 2023, Peete was fired by the Cowboys following the team's divisional playoff loss to the San Francisco 49ers.

On February 21, 2023, the Tampa Bay Buccaneers hired Peete as their running backs coach.

== Personal life ==
Peete is the brother of former NFL quarterback, Rodney Peete. Peete's father Willie also served as running backs coach for the Bears from 1995 to 1997 before becoming a team scout. Peete and his wife Rebeca welcomed twins, Reeco (son) and Gisele (daughter) in April 2007.
