= Kevin Butler (American football) =

American football player (born 1962)

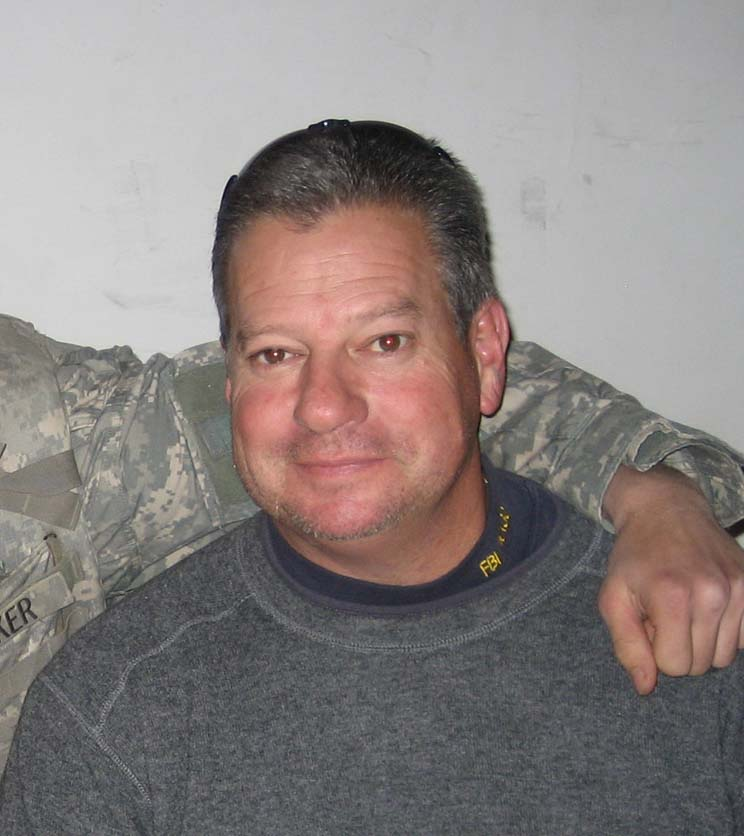
- Butler in 2006

No. 6, 3
- Position: Placekicker

Personal information
- Born: July 24, 1962 (age 64); Savannah, Georgia, U.S.
- Listed height: 6 ft 0 in (1.83 m)
- Listed weight: 215 lb (98 kg)

Career information
- High school: Redan (Stone Mountain, Georgia)
- College: Georgia
- NFL draft: 1985: 4th round, 105th overall pick

Career history
- Chicago Bears (1985–1995); Arizona Cardinals (1996–1997)

Awards and highlights
- Super Bowl champion (XX); 2× Second-team All-Pro (1985, 1989); NFL scoring leader (1985); PFWA All-Rookie Team (1985); 100 greatest Bears of All-Time; Consensus All-American (1984); Third-team All-American (1983); 3× First-team All-SEC (1981, 1983, 1984); Second-team All-SEC (1982); Florida–Georgia Hall of Fame; First kicker ever inducted in the College Football Hall of Fame

Career NFL statistics
- Field goals made: 265
- Field goals attempted: 361
- Field goal %: 73.4
- Longest field goal: 55
- Stats at Pro Football Reference
- College Football Hall of Fame

Kevin Gregory Butler (born July 24, 1962) is an American former professional football player who was a placekicker in the National Football League (NFL). He played college football for the Georgia Bulldogs, and then played in the NFL for the Chicago Bears (1985–1995) and the Arizona Cardinals (1996–1997). Since retiring, he has continued his affiliation with the University of Georgia as a special teams assistant and the cohost of the Budweiser Fifth Quarter Show on 106.1 WNGC and 960 WRFC in Athens. He is the first kicker ever inducted into the College Football Hall of Fame.

== Early life and college career ==
Butler was born in Savannah, Georgia. He attended Redan High School in Stone Mountain, Georgia, outside Atlanta where he played football and soccer. He loved to play sports and play the guitar.

During Butler's senior year, Redan played Marist High School for the state championship. In the closing moments of a very close game, Butler kicked a 44-yard field goal that gave the winning margin to the Redan Raiders. Attending the game was Georgia Bulldog Head Coach Vince Dooley. In a brief, impromptu exchange outside the door to the visiting locker room, Dooley congratulated Butler and pointed out that Bulldog kicker Rex Robinson would be graduating at the end of the school year. Georgia, Dooley said, would be needing a new kicker. The next year, Butler began his career as the Bulldogs' kicker.

At the University of Georgia Butler was a two-time All-American, and a four-time All-Southeastern Conference football player including three First-team selections. At the conclusion of the 2025-2026 season Butler is 6th in scoring in Bulldogs history with 353 points (122 PAT’s, 77 field goals), and he is 26th in career scoring in SEC history (including all players, kickers and non-kickers). Butler helped lead Bulldog teams to two SEC titles and four bowl appearances, kicked a school record 60 yard field goal to beat the Clemson Tigers in 1984, set an NCAA record with 27 multiple field-goal games, and was named to All-Century teams selected by the Walter Camp Football Foundation and Sports Illustrated, as well as to ABC Sports' College Football All Time All-America team. In December 2001, Butler became the first kicker to be inducted into the College Football Hall of Fame.

Later in his Georgia career, Butler opted to not use a tee to attempt most field goals, in order to better prepare him for the NFL. The NCAA banned use of a tee for field goals and extra points in 1989.

== Professional career ==
In his 11 seasons with the Bears, Butler became the team's all-time leading scorer with 1,116 points, easily surpassing the old record of 750 points held by Walter Payton. Butler held that record until October 11, 2015, when it was broken by kicker Robbie Gould.

Butler was also part of the 1985 Chicago Bears team who won Super Bowl XX. He set a rookie scoring record with 144 points on 31 field goals and all of his 51 extra point attempts and kicking three field goals in the Super Bowl. His record stood until 2014, when it was broken by place kicker Cody Parkey of the Philadelphia Eagles.

It was said that Butler called his fiancée from training camp in Platteville, Wisconsin, and explained that "we're going to have to change the date of our wedding, because we're going to the Super Bowl and it's on January 26th."

When he was released by the Bears after the 1995 season, he was the last remaining holdover from the Super Bowl XX team. Butler finished his 13 NFL seasons with 265 of 361 field goals (73%) and 413 of 426 extra point attempts, giving him 1,208 total points, sixth-most in NFL history among kickers.

== Post-playing career ==
After retiring from football, Butler worked for UgMo Technologies, a King of Prussia, Pennsylvania-based company that focuses on turf irrigation.

Butler returned to the University of Georgia in the fall of 2016 to complete his undergraduate degree, which he received in May 2018. He was also an undergraduate assistant for the Bulldogs during the 2016 and 2017 seasons.

== Career regular season statistics ==
Career high/best bolded

Regular season statistics
Season	Team (record)	G	FGM	FGA	%	<20	20-29	30-39	40-49	50+	LNG	BLK	XPM	XPA	%	PTS
1985	CHI (15–1)	**16**	**31**	37	**83.8**	**2–2**	13–13	**13–14**	3–6	0–2	46	0	**51**	**51**	**100.0**	**144**
1986	CHI (14–2)	**16**	28	**41**	68.3	1–1	11–14	9–12	6–8	1–6	52	0	36	37	97.3	120
1987	CHI (11–4)	12	19	28	67.9	0–0	11–11	5–5	1–6	2–6	52	0	28	30	93.3	85
1988	CHI (12–4)	**16**	15	19	78.9	1–1	4–4	7–8	3–6	0–0	45	0	37	38	97.4	82
1989	CHI (6–10)	**16**	15	19	78.9	0–0	6–6	6–7	3–5	0–1	46	0	43	45	95.6	88
1990	CHI (11–5)	**16**	26	37	70.3	1–1	8–8	5–8	**8–13**	4–7	52	0	36	37	97.3	114
1991	CHI (11–5)	**16**	19	29	65.5	1–1	9–11	3–5	5–9	1–3	50	0	32	34	94.1	89
1992	CHI (5–11)	**16**	19	26	73.1	1–1	8–8	9–10	0–4	1–3	50	0	34	34	**100.0**	91
1993	CHI (7–9)	**16**	27	36	75.0	0–0	7–8	12–13	3–7	**5–8**	**55**	**1**	21	22	95.5	102
1994	CHI (9–7)	15	21	29	72.4	1–1	7–7	6–9	5–8	2–4	52	**1**	24	24	**100.0**	87
1995	CHI (9-7)	**16**	23	31	74.2	0–0	**16–19**	5–6	2–4	0–2	47	**1**	45	45	**100.0**	114
1996	ARI (7–9)	7	14	17	82.4	1–1	6–6	5–8	2–2	0–0	41	**1**	17	19	89.5	59
1997	ARI (4–12)	6	8	12	66.7	0–0	4–4	2–4	2–4	0–0	49	0	9	10	90.0	33
Career (13 seasons)		184	265	361	73.4	9–9	110–119	87–109	43–82	16–42	55	4	413	426	96.9	1208

== Personal life ==
Kevin is married to Cathy Butler. They have three children together: Katie Scarlett, Andrew Joseph and Kylie Savannah. Scarlett and Drew attended the University of Georgia. Savannah was a student at Marymount Manhattan College and is a ballet dancer. Drew was the starting punter for the Georgia Bulldogs and played in the NFL from 2012 to 2016 for the Pittsburgh Steelers and Arizona Cardinals.
