= Terry Hoage =

American football player (born 1962)

No. 24, 34, 41, 27
- Position: Safety

Personal information
- Born: April 11, 1962 (age 64); Ames, Iowa, U.S.
- Listed height: 6 ft 2 in (1.88 m)
- Listed weight: 201 lb (91 kg)

Career information
- High school: Huntsville (Huntsville, Texas)
- College: Georgia
- NFL draft: 1984: 3rd round, 68th overall pick

Career history
- New Orleans Saints (1984–1985); Philadelphia Eagles (1986–1990); Washington Redskins (1991–1992); San Francisco 49ers (1993); Houston Oilers (1993); Arizona Cardinals (1994–1996)

Awards and highlights
- Super Bowl champion (XXVI); National champion (1980); 2× Consensus All-American (1982, 1983); SEC Male Athlete of the Year (1984); 2× First-team All-SEC (1982, 1983); Florida–Georgia Hall of Fame

Career NFL statistics
- Tackles: 578
- Interceptions: 21
- Fumble recoveries: 12
- Sacks: 7.0
- Stats at Pro Football Reference
- College Football Hall of Fame

Terrell Lee Hoage (born April 11, 1962) is an American former professional football player who was a safety in the National Football League (NFL) for 13 seasons during the 1980s and 1990s. Hoage played college football for the University of Georgia, and was recognized as an All-American. He played in the NFL for the New Orleans Saints, Philadelphia Eagles, Washington Redskins, San Francisco 49ers, Houston Oilers and Arizona Cardinals.

== Early life ==
Hoage was born in Ames, Iowa. He moved to Huntsville, Texas in 1968 and attended elementary, intermediate and high school in Huntsville. In junior high and high school he played Football, Basketball and ran track for five years and was a starter in football from his sophomore year through senior playing both ways, as quarterback and free safety. He was recognized on All Trinity Valley and All District for all three years. His academic standing was in the top five percent and took college prep courses all four years in high school. Although he was college material, only Georgia offered him a football scholarship where he became a starter in his sophomore year. Huntsville Independent School District 1976–1980.

== College career ==
Hoage attended the University of Georgia, where he played for coach Vince Dooley's Georgia Bulldogs football team from 1980 to 1983. As a freshman, blocked a Notre Dame field goal in Georgia's National Championship 17–10 win. As a junior and again as a senior, was a recognized as a consensus first All-American. Coach Dooley called Hoage "the best defensive player I've ever coached and maybe the best one I've ever seen." He finished fifth in the voting for the Heisman Trophy in 1983. He graduated from Georgia in 1985 with a bachelor's degree in genetics with a 3.85 grade point average. Terry's college roommate, Mike Hubbard, became the first Republican Speaker of the Alabama House of Representatives in 136 years.

== Professional career ==
Hoage was selected by the New Orleans Saints in the third round (68th pick overall) of the 1984 NFL draft. His NFL career spanned 13 seasons and six teams: the New Orleans Saints, Philadelphia Eagles, Washington Redskins, Houston Oilers, San Francisco 49ers, and Arizona Cardinals. His professional football career ended in 1996. Hoage scored his only NFL touchdown in the first game of the 1988 season when he rushed for a 38-yard touchdown against the Tampa Bay Buccaneers.

== Life after football ==
After retiring from football, Hoage interned at Merrill Lynch, passed the Series 7 exam, and seemed on his way to a career in finance. However, as he would recall in a 2012 interview, "I absolutely hated it. The coat and tie. Going to the office. It didn't fit my personality at all." He and his wife Jennifer, along with their two children, then moved to Phoenix, where he started a construction company, but were still not satisfied with their family life. They then moved to Templeton, California, a small Central Coast town. He had one further opportunity to become involved in the game, but turned down Jeff Fisher's offer of a coaching position with the Tennessee Titans. Hoage then began farming a small piece of land in the area.

In 2002, the Hoages discovered a 26-acre (110,000 m^{2}) vineyard in Paso Robles, California that had just come on the market. Terry called in Justin Smith, a friend and winemaker who would go on to produce a wine named by Wine Spectator as Wine of the Year, to evaluate the land. Yahoo! Sports writer Adam Watson said that Hoage's involvement with Smith was "the equivalent of shopping for a computer with a young Bill Gates." When Smith indicated that the property had world-class potential, the Hoages bought the property, moved onto it, and enlisted Smith to help them get started in the business. The association with Smith gave the Hoages credibility as they started their business, and they took over the winemaking in 2004.

They were named among the Top New California Wine Producers in 2008 by Wine Spectator. The vineyard is operated as TH Estates Vineyards and produces Rhone varietal wines. Hoage produces roughly 2,000 cases a year. The vineyard's first wine was The Hedge a Syrah. The "Hedge" refers both to a pruning technique and the fabled Hedges of the University of Georgia's Sanford Stadium. Hoage dedicated his first vintage of The Hedge to his former coach, Vince Dooley. Hoage's later wines have been marketed with names of a similar concept, playing off both his football and winemaking careers. "46" refers to the 46 defense created by Buddy Ryan, for whom Hoage played eight seasons, and Highway 46, that runs into Paso Robles. "Skins" refers both to the Redskins and grape skins. "5 Blocks" comes from Hoage's five blocked field goals at Georgia, plus the specific area of grapes used.

The Hoages shut down TH Estate Wines and retired from winemaking in 2023.

== Awards and honors ==
- Two-time consensus first-team All-American
- Two-time SEC Defensive Player of the Year
- 5th in voting for the 1983 Heisman Trophy
- 1984 Top V Award
- 1984 SEC Athlete of the Year Award
- 1997 Georgia-Florida Hall of Fame
- 2000 inductee in the College Football Hall of Fame
- 2004 inductee in the CoSIDA Academic Hall of Fame
- 2009 inductee in the Georgia Sports Hall of Fame
- Named to the SEC 25-year team (1961–85).
- Named to Walter Camp All Century Team as a safety

== See also ==
- List of celebrities who own wineries and vineyards
