= Tim Newton =

American football player (born 1963)

No. 96
- Position: Defensive tackle

Personal information
- Born: March 23, 1963 (age 63); Orlando, Florida, U.S.
- Listed height: 6 ft 0 in (1.83 m)
- Listed weight: 280 lb (127 kg)

Career information
- High school: Jones (Orlando)
- College: Florida
- NFL draft: 1985: 6th round, 164th overall pick

Career history
- Minnesota Vikings (1985–1989); Tampa Bay Buccaneers (1990–1991); Kansas City Chiefs (1992–1993)

Awards and highlights
- PFWA All-Rookie Team (1985); Second-team All-American (1984); First-team All-SEC (1984); Second-team All-SEC (1983)

Career NFL statistics
- Games played: 108
- Games started: 47
- Sacks: 17
- Interceptions: 2
- Stats at Pro Football Reference

Timothy Reginald Newton (born March 23, 1963) is an American former professional football player who was a defensive tackle in the National Football League (NFL) for nine seasons during the 1980s and 1990s. Newton played college football for the University of Florida, and thereafter, he played for the Minnesota Vikings, Tampa Bay Buccaneers and Kansas City Chiefs of the NFL.

== Early life ==
Newton was born in Orlando, Florida in 1963. He attended Jones High School in Orlando, and played for the Jones Tigers high school football team.

== College career ==
Newton accepted an athletic scholarship to attend the University of Florida in Gainesville, Florida, where he played for coach Charley Pell and coach Galen Hall's Florida Gators football teams from 1981 to 1984. As a senior in 1984, Newton was a first-team All-Southeastern Conference (SEC) selection and a second-team All-American.

== Professional career ==
The Minnesota Vikings selected Newton in the sixth round (164th pick overall) of the 1985 NFL draft. He played for the Vikings for five seasons from 1985 to 1989. He also played for the Tampa Bay Buccaneers in 1990 and 1991, and the Kansas City Chiefs in 1992 and 1993. In his nine-season NFL career, Newton played in a total of 108 regular season games, and started forty-seven of them.

== Personal life ==
He is the younger brother of Nate Newton, who also played in the NFL.

== See also ==
- Florida Gators football, 1980–89
- History of the Minnesota Vikings
- List of Florida Gators football All-Americans
- List of Florida Gators in the NFL draft
- List of Kansas City Chiefs players
