= Lomas Brown =

American football player (born 1963)

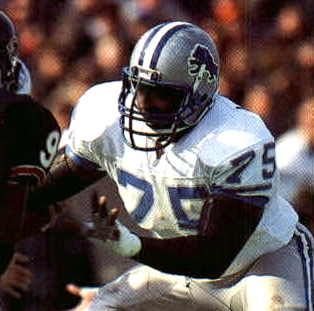
- Brown playing for the Detroit Lions, circa 1987

No. 75, 76
- Position: Offensive tackle

Personal information
- Born: March 30, 1963 (age 63); Miami, Florida, U.S.
- Listed height: 6 ft 4 in (1.93 m)
- Listed weight: 282 lb (128 kg)

Career information
- High school: Miami Springs (Miami Springs, Florida)
- College: Florida
- NFL draft: 1985: 1st round, 6th overall pick

Career history
- Detroit Lions (1985–1995); Arizona Cardinals (1996–1998); Cleveland Browns (1999); New York Giants (2000–2001); Tampa Bay Buccaneers (2002)

Awards and highlights
- Super Bowl champion (XXXVII); 3× First-team All-Pro (1991, 1992, 1995); 3× Second-team All-Pro (1989, 1990, 1994); 7× Pro Bowl (1990–1996); PFWA All-Rookie Team (1985); Pride of the Lions; Detroit Lions 75th Anniversary Team; Detroit Lions All-Time Team; Jacobs Blocking Trophy (1984); Consensus All-American (1984); First-team All-SEC (1984); Second-team All-SEC (1983); University of Florida Athletic Hall of Fame

Career NFL statistics
- Games played: 263
- Games started: 251
- Fumble recoveries: 3
- Stats at Pro Football Reference
- College Football Hall of Fame

Lomas Brown Jr. (born March 30, 1963) is an American former professional football player who was an offensive tackle in the National Football League (NFL) for 18 seasons in the 1980s, 1990s and early 2000s. Brown played college football for the Florida Gators, receiving consensus All-American honors. A first-round pick in the 1985 NFL draft, he played professionally for the Detroit Lions and four other NFL teams. He is currently a color analyst for Lions radio broadcasts on WXYT 97.1 The Ticket, as well as a commentator and analyst for ESPN and other television and radio networks.

== Early life ==
Brown was born in Miami, Florida. He attended Miami Springs High School in Miami Springs, Florida, where he was a stand-out offensive lineman for the Miami Springs Golden Hawks high school football team. In 2007, the Florida High School Athletic Association (FHSAA) recognized Brown as one of the 33 all-time greatest Florida high school football players of the last 100 years by naming him to its "All-Century Team."

== College career ==
Brown accepted an athletic scholarship to attend the University of Florida in Gainesville, Florida, where he played for coach Charley Pell and coach Galen Hall's Florida Gators football teams from 1981 to 1984. He started 34 games in his college career at Florida, all at tackle. Brown was a team captain, a first-team All-Southeastern Conference (SEC) selection and a consensus first-team All-American, and the winner of the Jacobs Blocking Trophy recognizing the best blocker in the SEC during his senior year in 1984. He anchored the Gators' outstanding offensive line, memorably dubbed "The Great Wall of Florida," and which included Brown, Phil Bromley, Billy Hinson, Crawford Ker and Jeff Zimmerman in 1984. Behind the blocking of Brown and his Great Wall teammates, the Gators' quarterback Kerwin Bell, fullback John L. Williams and halfback Neal Anderson led the Gators to a 9–1–1 overall win–loss record and won their first SEC championship with a conference record of 5–0–1. (The title was later vacated by the SEC university presidents because of NCAA rules violations committed by Charley Pell and the Gators coaching staff between 1979 and 1983.) Brown was inducted into the University of Florida Athletic Hall of Fame as a "Gator Great" in 1995. As part of its 2006 article series about the top 100 players of the first 100 years of Florida football, The Gainesville Sun recognized him as the No. 8 all-time Gator player.

While Brown was a student at Florida, he was initiated as a member of Phi Beta Sigma fraternity (Zeta Kappa chapter). He later returned to the university during the NFL off-season to complete his bachelor's degree in health and human performance in 1996.

== Professional career ==
The Detroit Lions selected Brown sixth overall in the first round of the 1985 NFL Draft. He played 11 seasons for the Lions (1985–1995) before joining the Arizona Cardinals (1996–1998), the Cleveland Browns (1999), the New York Giants (2000–2001), and the Tampa Bay Buccaneers (2002). Brown won Super Bowl XXXVII with the Buccaneers and retired after 18 seasons in the NFL. Brown played in 263 games, starting 251, and was selected for seven consecutive Pro Bowl from 1990 to 1996.

Brown is probably remembered most from his years in Detroit, where he gained the reputation as one of the league's premier offensive tackles. He was a pivotal piece on the offensive line that blocked for Barry Sanders, one of the greatest running backs of all time. Brown was one of the most durable offensive linemen in the Detroit Lions' history, starting all but one of the 164 games that he played for the Lions.

Along with Kevin Glover, Brown was a key blocker on a line that paved the way for Sanders, who claimed NFL rushing titles in 1990 and 1994. He blocked for Sanders for seven seasons (1989–1995), and Sanders accumulated 10,172 yards (an average of 4.9 yards per carry) and 73 rushing touchdowns during that time.

Brown was a member of Lions teams that made the playoffs in 1991, 1993, 1994 and 1995, and he was a member of the 1991 and 1993 squads that won the NFC Central division title. In 1991, the Lions set a franchise high with 12 regular season wins and earned a berth in the 1991 NFC Championship Game. During the 1995-96 playoffs, Brown guaranteed a victory over the Philadelphia Eagles. The Eagles opened the game with 51–7 run. The Lions went on to lose the game 37–58.

While still playing in the NFL, he founded the Lomas Brown Jr. Foundation. The foundation supports educational institutions and related activities focusing on scholarships, student financial aid and awards programs.

Brown started the Lomas Brown Foundation which donated a great deal of time, energy and money to many charitable causes throughout the Metro Detroit area. numerous philanthropic efforts, including coaching kids and managing the provides scholarships and financial aid to incoming college students.

On October 30, 2023, Brown was inducted into the Detroit Lions Hall of Fame, known as the Pride of the Lions.

== Life after the NFL ==
Since his retirement from the NFL, Brown has spent some time with the NFL Network and ESPNEWS as an analyst and also co-hosts a sports radio show for WXYT-FM in Detroit, Michigan. He has also served as an analyst on ESPN First Take, and is a co-host of the segment "Law Offices of Brooks and Brown." In 2018 he was named as the color analyst for the Detroit Lions radio broadcasts on WJR, replacing Jim Brandstatter.

During 2012, Brown served as an assistant coach for the Andover Barons football team of Andover High School in Bloomfield Hills, Michigan.

On December 22, 2012, Brown admitted during an interview on the SVP and Russillo show on ESPN Radio that he purposefully failed to block Green Bay Packers defensive end Sean Jones during a 1994 game so teammate and quarterback Scott Mitchell would get injured and be forced to leave the game. Mitchell's finger was broken on the play and he left the game. Mitchell was taken aback by Brown's comments, remarking, "I had Lomas in my home. . . . I'm dumbfounded that he would do such a thing. . . . [F]or him to allow someone to take a shot at a teammate, that's crazy."

Less than a week after the interview, Brown expressed remorse during an episode of ESPN First Take, saying "It's one play out of the 18,000 that I regret." He did not deny his original comments: "I'm not going to retract, I'm not going to sit here and make excuses . . . The one thing I can say is I should have been more tactful at how I said that. That was wrong on my part. I should have humbly said that. It came off boastful, and I shouldn't have said it that way. I said it, I can't take it back, but I shouldn't have said it the way I said it."

Mitchell would eventually forgive Brown, with both indicating, after reviewing footage of the play in question (as well as considering other details of the game that Brown got wrong) that Brown didn't actually miss his block, and that Brown may have fabricated the story to further his career with ESPN at the time. Brown called it a moment where “I blanked out...I started ranting and raving about what I did. … Until I saw the play I actually thought I did it.”

Brown was inducted into the College Football Hall of Fame in 2020.

== See also ==
- 1984 College Football All-America Team
- Florida Gators football, 1980–89
- List of Detroit Lions players
- List of Florida Gators football All-Americans
- List of Florida Gators in the NFL draft
- List of New York Giants players
- List of Phi Beta Sigma brothers
- List of SEC Jacobs Blocking Trophy winners
- List of University of Florida alumni
- List of University of Florida Athletic Hall of Fame members
