= Shawn Burks =

American football player (born 1963)

No. 58
- Position: Linebacker

Personal information
- Born: February 10, 1963 (age 63); Baton Rouge, Louisiana, U.S.
- Listed height: 6 ft 1 in (1.85 m)
- Listed weight: 230 lb (104 kg)

Career information
- High school: Central (Baton Rouge)
- College: LSU
- NFL draft: 1986: undrafted

Career history
- Washington Redskins (1986)

Awards and highlights
- Second-team All-SEC (1984)

Career NFL statistics
- Games played: 15
- Stats at Pro Football Reference

Shawn Spencer Burks (born February 10, 1963) is an American former professional football player who was a linebacker for the Washington Redskins of the National Football League (NFL). He played college football for the LSU Tigers.
