= David King (defensive back) =

American football player (born 1963)

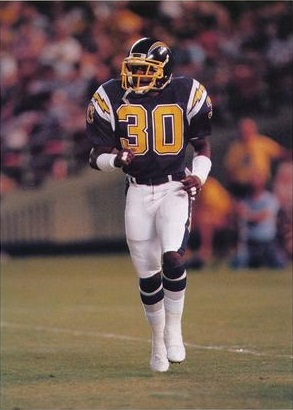
- King c. 1985

No. 30, 40
- Position: Defensive back

Personal information
- Born: May 19, 1963; Mobile, Alabama, U.S.
- Listed height: 5 ft 8 in (1.73 m)
- Listed weight: 176 lb (80 kg)

Career information
- High school: Fairhope (Fairhope, Alabama)
- College: Auburn (1981–1984)
- NFL draft: 1985: 10th round, 264th overall pick

Career history
- San Diego Chargers (1985); Denver Broncos (1987)*; Green Bay Packers (1987); Houston Oilers (1989)*
- * Offseason or practice squad member only

Awards and highlights
- 2× First-team All-SEC (1983, 1984)
- Stats at Pro Football Reference

David Joel King (born May 19, 1963) is an American former professional football defensive back who played two seasons in the National Football League (NFL) with the San Diego Chargers and Green Bay Packers. He was selected by the Chargers in the tenth round of the 1985 NFL draft after playing college football at Auburn University.

== Early life ==
David Joel King was born on May 19, 1963, in Mobile, Alabama. He attended Fairhope High School in Fairhope, Alabama.

== College career ==
King was a four-year letterman for the Auburn Tigers from 1981 to 1984. He earned United Press International first-team All-SEC honors in both 1983 and 1984 and Associated Press second-team All-SEC honors in both 1983 and 1984. The 1983 Tigers were named national champion by NCAA-designated major selectors of Billingsley, College Football Researchers Association, and The New York Times, while named co-national champion by both Rothman and Sagarin. King recorded three interceptions in 1981, six interceptions in 1982, two interceptions and one interception return touchdown in 1983, and one interception in 1984.

== Professional career ==
King was selected by the San Diego Chargers in the tenth round, with the 264th overall pick, of the 1985 NFL draft. He officially signed with the team on July 10, 1985. He played in one game for the Chargers in 1985 before being placed on injured reserve on September 10. King was released on August 15, 1986.

King signed with the Denver Broncos on May 1, 1987. He was released on August 1, 1987.

On September 25, 1987, King was signed by the Green Bay Packers during the 1987 NFL players strike. He appeared in three games for the Packers that season. He was released on October 20, 1987, after the strike ended.

King signed with the Houston Oilers on May 4, 1989, but was later released.
