= Jeff Sanchez (defensive back, born 1962) =

American football player

Profile
- Position: Safety

Personal information
- Born: May 11, 1962 (age 64); Fort Oglethorpe, Georgia, U.S.
- Listed height: 5 ft 11 in (1.80 m)
- Listed weight: 180 lb (82 kg)

Career information
- High school: Mater Dei (Santa Ana, California)
- College: Fullerton JC (1980–1981); Georgia (1982–1984)
- NFL draft: 1985: 12th round, 327th overall pick

Career history
- Pittsburgh Steelers (1985)*
- * Offseason or practice squad member only

Awards and highlights
- Consensus All-American (1984); 2× First-team All-SEC (1982, 1984)

Jeff R. Sanchez (born May 11, 1962) is an American former college football safety who played for the Georgia Bulldogs. He was a consensus All-American in 1984. He was selected by the Pittsburgh Steelers in the twelfth round of the 1985 NFL draft.

== Early life ==
Jeff R. Sanchez was born on May 11, 1962, in Fort Oglethorpe, Georgia. He attended Mater Dei High School in Santa Ana, California, where he played high school football as a quarterback and defensive back. He also participated in basketball and track in high school.

== College career ==
Coming out of high school, Sanchez did not receive any scholarship offers from major colleges. He instead opted to play college football at Fullerton Junior College from 1980 to 1981 as a free safety. He then transferred to play for the Georgia Bulldogs of the University of Georgia. His nine interceptions in 1982 were the second most in the country. Sanchez was named first-team All-SEC by both the Associated Press (AP) and United Press International (UPI) for the 1982 season. He was redshirted in 1983 due to a broken arm. He recorded four interceptions his senior year in 1984, garnering consensus All-American honors. He was also named first-team All-SEC by both the AP and UPI in 1984. Sanchez posted 211 tackles during his time at Georgia.

== Professional career ==
Sanchez was selected by the Pittsburgh Steelers in the twelfth round, with the 327th overall pick, of the 1985 NFL draft. In regards to his late selection in the draft, Sanchez stated "No one ever said much to me about when I'd be picked. I guess my size scared off some teams." He was waived by the Steelers in August 1985.
