= Fairhope High School =

Public secondary school in Fairhope, Alabama, United States

Location
- 1 Pirate Dr; Fairhope, Alabama 36532; United States; 30°29′53″N 87°53′01″W

Information
- Type: Public
- Established: 1923 (103 years ago)
- CEEB code: 011060
- NCES School ID: 010027000100
- Principal: Jon Cardwell
- Teaching staff: 99.94 (FTE)
- Grades: 9–12
- Enrollment: 1,642 (2023–2024)
- Student to teacher ratio: 16.43
- Campus: Suburban
- Colors: Blue and gold
- Athletics conference: AHSAA 7A
- Nickname: Pirates
- Website: www.fairhopehs.com

Fairhope High School (FHS) is a public secondary school located in Fairhope, Alabama. Fairhope High School is a part of the Baldwin County Public Schools system. They service grades 9–12. Fairhope High school offers not only sports, but a band program.

== Clubs and activities ==
A wide variety of clubs some include: Chess Club, FCCLA, a Christian prayer group known as First Priority, the Girls Service Club, Interact, Honors Society, and Key Club.

== Athletics ==
The Pirates compete in the AHSAA's largest classification, 7A. Fairhope annually fields teams in football, baseball, basketball, soccer, track, volleyball, cross country, golf, tennis, swimming and wrestling.

=== Football ===
Each year, the football team plays Foley High School for the Blue-Gold trophy and the Daphne Trojans for the Jubilee Cup. Fairhope's biggest rivals are Foley and the Trojans of Daphne High School. Prior to division of student talent with Daphne High School, Fairhope was a perennial contender in many team sports and earned several state titles.

In 2009, the Pirates finished the regular season 10–0, with wins over both Daphne and Foley. However, Fairhope lost in the second round of the AHSAA 6A State Playoffs, finishing the season 11–1.

=== Soccer ===
Fairhope has an established boys' and girls' soccer program with winning traditions. Fairhope's boys' soccer team won the 6A Alabama State Championship in 2009. A new field was built across the street from the school.

=== Baseball ===
The Pirates have gone to the AHSAA playoffs eight consecutive seasons and won state championships in 1983 and 1984. The Pirates have also claimed the 6A Area 2 Championship two years running and finished this season 36–8, losing in the playoffs semifinals to the eventual state champions of Auburn High.

== Notable alumni ==
- Regina Benjamin - 18th Surgeon General of the United States
- Caden Creel - college football quarterback for the Jacksonville State Gamecocks
- David King - NFL player
- Leon Lett - Former NFL Pro Bowler for the Cowboys
- Riley Leonard - NFL quarterback for the Indianapolis Colts
- Ben Rudolph - Former Defensive tackle/Defensive end of the New York Jets
- Eric Yelding - Former MLB player (Houston Astros, Chicago Cubs)

== Feeder schools ==
Schools that feed into Fairhope High include:

- Fairhope Middle School (7–8), 842 students, Principal Angie Hall
- J. Larry Newton School (K–6), 931 students, Principal Patrice Wolfe
- Fairhope East Elementary School (K–6), 721 students, Principal Carol Broughten
- Fairhope West Elementary School (K–6), 1011 students, Principal Julie Pierce
