= Gregg Carr =

American football player and physician (born 1962)

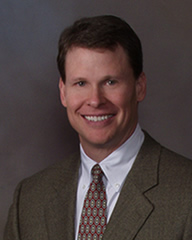

No. 91
- Position: Linebacker

Personal information
- Born: March 31, 1962 (age 64); Birmingham, Alabama, U.S.
- Listed height: 6 ft 2 in (1.88 m)
- Listed weight: 219 lb (99 kg)

Career information
- High school: Woodlawn (Birmingham)
- College: Auburn (1981–1984)
- NFL draft: 1985: 6th round, 160th overall pick

Career history
- Pittsburgh Steelers (1985–1988)

Awards and highlights
- Consensus All-American (1984); Second-team All-American (1983); SEC Most Valuable Defense Player (1984); 3× All-SEC (1982–1984); Alabama Sports Hall of Fame (2008)

Career NFL statistics
- Sacks: 7.5
- Interceptions: 1
- Fumble recoveries: 2
- Stats at Pro Football Reference
- College Football Hall of Fame

Gregg Kevin Carr (born March 31, 1962) is an American former professional football player who was a linebacker for four seasons with the Pittsburgh Steelers of the National Football League (NFL) from 1985 to 1988. He played college football for the Auburn Tigers, earning consensus All-American honors in 1984. He was selected by the Steelers in the sixth round of the 1985 NFL draft. After his football career, he became an orthopedic surgeon. He was inducted into the College Football Hall of Fame in 2025.

== Career ==
Carr played high school football at Woodlawn High School (Birmingham, Alabama). As a member of Auburn University football's "Team of the Century", Carr was recognized as both an Academic All-American and an Athletic All-American. After graduating from Auburn University with a degree in engineering in 1985, he went on to play inside linebacker for the Pittsburgh Steelers, who drafted him in the sixth round of the 1985 NFL Draft, for four seasons. While playing professional football, Carr completed the requirements for medical school, and in 1994, he received his medical degree from the University of Alabama School of Medicine. Carr completed his orthopedic surgery residency at Greenville Memorial Hospital in Greenville, South Carolina, where he also served as chief resident. He was then awarded a fellowship in Sports Medicine at the American Sports Medicine Institute in Birmingham, Alabama where he trained under some of the top sports medicine physicians in the country. Currently, Dr. Carr practices Sports Medicine and Orthopedic surgery at Southern Orthopaedic Specialists in Birmingham, Alabama.

== Awards ==
Carr was selected as a 2010 recipient of the NCAA Silver Anniversary Award. He was presented with the award January 15, 2010, during the Honors Celebration at the 2010 NCAA Convention in Atlanta. The Silver Anniversary Award is given annually to six former student-athletes who have made significant professional and civic contributions since they completed their intercollegiate eligibility 25 years ago.

In addition, Carr was named as an inductee into the Alabama Sports Hall of Fame Class of 2008. Elected by statewide selection committees, Carr was inducted on May 31, 2008, in Birmingham.

As a four-year letterwinner at linebacker for the Tigers from 1981 to 1984, Carr was the SEC's most honored athlete in 1984. As a senior, the civil engineering major was a consensus All-American, National Football Foundation Scholar-Athlete, one of the NCAA's Top Five Student-Athletes and a Lombardi Award nominee.

The Birmingham native was the 1984 SEC Lineman of the Year and named the Birmingham Monday Morning Quarterback Club Most Valuable SEC Lineman. A three-time All-SEC selection and a four-time Academic All-SEC team member, he was Auburn's leading tackler as a sophomore and junior and the second leading tackler as a senior. Carr finished his career at Auburn with nine sacks and 289 solo tackles.
