= Knox Culpepper =

American football player (born 1963)

No. 48 – Georgia Bulldogs
- Position: Linebacker

Personal information
- Born: April 13, 1963 (age 63); Atlanta, Georgia, U.S.

Career information
- High school: The Lovett School (Atlanta, Georgia)

Knox Culpepper (born April 13, 1963) is an American former college football player. Born and raised in Atlanta, Culpepper was an all-state linebacker at The Lovett School, where he graduated in 1981. After graduating from Lovett, he enrolled in the University of Georgia and played linebacker for the Georgia Bulldogs from 1981 to 1984. He served as the team captain for the Bulldogs in 1984.

Culpepper still holds the team records for the Bulldogs in three categories:

- Total tackles in a single game - 26 vs. Georgia Tech in 1983 (He is also second on the list with 25 vs. Auburn in 1983)
- Total assists in a season - 116 in 1984 (He is also second on the list with 105 in 1983)
- Total tackles in a season - 170 in 1984 (He is also second on the list with 166 in 1983)

In 1985, after completing his career with the Bulldogs, Culpepper appeared in the Blue-Gray Game and the Hula Bowl.
