= The Football News =

Weekly tabloid newspaper

The Football News, founded in 1939, was a weekly tabloid newspaper covering collegiate and professional football.

The publication was designated by the NCAA as a "major selector" of college football national championships, for the years 1958 to 2002. They were also designated as an "official selector" for college football All-America teams for the years 1993 to 2001.
