= 1996 Chicago Bears season =

NFL team season

- Owner: Virginia Halas McCaskey
- Head coach: Dave Wannstedt
- Offensive coordinator: Ron Turner
- Defensive coordinator: Bob Slowik
- Home stadium: Soldier Field

Results
- Record: 7–9
- Division place: 3rd NFC Central
- Playoffs: Did not qualify

The 1996 Chicago Bears season was their 77th regular season completed in the National Football League (NFL). They failed to improve on their 9–7 record from 1995 and finished with a 7–9 record under head coach Dave Wannstedt. It was the team's first losing season since 1993, Wannstedt's first season.

== Offseason ==
Additions	Subtractions
LB Bryan Cox (Dolphins)	K Kevin Butler (Cardinals)
QB Dave Krieg (Cardinals)	WR Jeff Graham (Jets)
TE Kerry Cash (Raiders)	CB Jeremy Lincoln (Rams)
K Jeff Jaeger (Raiders)	

=== NFL draft ===
1996 Chicago Bears draft
Round	Pick	Player	Position	College	Notes
1	13	Walt Harris *	Cornerback	Mississippi State	
2	52	Bobby Engram	Wide receiver	Penn State	
4	116	Paul Grasmanis	Defensive tackle	Notre Dame	
5	152	Chris Villarrial	Guard	Indiana (PA)	
6	187	Jon Clark	Offensive tackle	Temple	
7	233	Marcus Keyes	Defensive tackle	North Alabama	
7	253	Michael Hicks	Running back	South Carolina State	
Made roster * Made at least one Pro Bowl during career

=== Undrafted free agents ===
1996 Undrafted free agents of note
Player	Position	College
Chris Martin	Cornerback	Northwestern
Bobby Neely	Tight end	Virginia

== Staff ==
1996 Chicago Bears staff
Front office: Chairman of the board – Ed McCaskey; President and chief executive officer – Michael McCaskey; Vice-president of operations – Ted Phillips; Director of player personnel – Rod Graves; Director of research and quality control – Craig Ver Steeg; Head coaches: Head coach – Dave Wannstedt; Assistant head coach – Tony Wise; Offensive coaches: Offensive coordinator/quarterbacks – Ron Turner; Running backs – Willie Peete; Wide receivers – Ivan Fears; Tight ends – Ted Plumb; Offensive line – Tony Wise	Defensive coaches: Defensive coordinator/linebackers – Bob Slowik; Defensive line – Clarence Brooks; Defensive backs – Carlos Mainord; Defensive assistant – Greg Schiano; Special teams coaches: Special teams – Danny Abramowicz; Strength and conditioning: Strength coordinator – Clyde Emrich; Physical development coordinator – Russ Riederer; Assistant physical development coordinator – Steve Little

== Roster ==
1996 Chicago Bears roster
Quarterbacks (QB): 10 Mark Butterfield; 17 Dave Krieg; 9 Shane Matthews; Running backs (RB): 30 Tony Carter FB; 38 Mike Faulkerson FB; 22 Robert Green; 29 Raymont Harris; 31 Rashaan Salaam; Wide receivers (WR): 80 Curtis Conway; 81 Bobby Engram; 88 Jack Jackson KR; 15 Phillip Riley; 83 Michael Timpson; Tight ends (TE): 84 Kerry Cash; 89 Ryan Wetnight	Offensive linemen (OL): 63 Todd Burger G; 72 Jon Clark T; 67 Jerry Fontenot C; 64 Andy Heck T; 79 James Parrish T; 75 Todd Perry G; 65 Evan Pilgrim G; 69 Octus Polk G; 76 Marcus Spears T; 58 Chris Villarrial G/C; 71 James Williams T; Defensive linemen (DL): 99 Jim Flanigan DT; 96 Albert Fontenot DE; 93 Paul Grasmanis DT; 73 Marcus Keyes DT; 68 Carl Reeves DE; 98 Carl Simpson DT; 90 Alonzo Spellman DE; 91 John Thierry DE	Linebackers (LB): 54 Greg Briggs OLB; 59 Joe Cain OLB; 55 Sean Harris OLB; 95 Dana Howard MLB; 53 Michael Lowery OLB; 92 Barry Minter MLB; 55 Vinson Smith OLB; Defensive backs (DB): 35 James Burton CB; 20 Mark Carrier FS; 23 Marty Carter SS; 46 Marlon Forbes CB/S; 27 Walt Harris CB; 26 John Mangum SS; 36 Anthony Marshall FS; 24 Kevin Miniefield CB; 21 Donnell Woolford CB; Special teams (ST): 91 Rob Davis LS; 1 Jeff Jaeger K; 16 Todd Sauerbrun P	Practice squad: 82 Fabien Bownes WR; 86 Mill Coleman WR; 44 Michael Hicks RB; 47 Charles Randolph TE; Reserve: 48 Clifton Abraham CB (IR); 74 James Augustino T (IR); 52 Bryan Cox LB (IR); -- Chris Gedney TE (IR); 85 Keith Jennings TE (IR); 32 Dwayne Joseph CB (IR); 12 Erik Kramer QB (IR); 25 Chris Martin CB (IR); 87 Bobby Neely TE (IR); 18 Steve Stenstrom QB (IR); 97 Chris Zorich DT (IR); 53 active, 11 inactive, 4 practice squad Rookies in italics

== Regular season ==
=== Schedule ===
Week	Date	Opponent	Result	TV Time	TV Announcers	Attendance
1	September 2, 1996	Dallas Cowboys	W 22–6	ABC 8:00pm	Al Michaels, Frank Gifford & Dan Dierdorf	66,944
2	September 8, 1996	at Washington Redskins	L 10–3	FOX 12:00pm	Dick Stockton & Matt Millen	52,711
3	September 15, 1996	Minnesota Vikings	L 20–14	FOX 12:00pm	Mike Breen & Bill Maas	61,301
4	September 22, 1996	at Detroit Lions	L 35–16	FOX 3:00pm	Kevin Harlan & Jerry Glanville	70,022
5	September 29, 1996	Oakland Raiders	W 19–17	NBC 12:00pm	Dick Enberg, Paul Maguire & Phil Simms	57,062
6	October 6, 1996	Green Bay Packers	L 37–6	FOX 12:00pm	Pat Summerall & John Madden	65,480
7	October 13, 1996	at New Orleans Saints	L 27–24	FOX 12:00pm	Mike Breen & Bill Maas	43,512
8	Bye					
9	October 28, 1996	at Minnesota Vikings	W 15–13	ABC 8:00pm	Al Michaels, Frank Gifford & Dan Dierdorf	58,143
10	November 3, 1996	Tampa Bay Buccaneers	W 13–10	FOX 12:00pm	Kenny Albert & Tim Green	58,727
11	November 10, 1996	at Denver Broncos	L 17–12	FOX 3:00pm	Kevin Harlan & Jerry Glanville	75,555
12	November 17, 1996	at Kansas City Chiefs	L 14–10	FOX 12:00pm	Dick Stockton & Matt Millen	76,752
13	November 24, 1996	Detroit Lions	W 31–14	FOX 12:00pm	Kenny Albert & Tim Green	55,864
14	December 1, 1996	at Green Bay Packers	L 28–17	FOX 12:00pm	Dick Stockton & Matt Millen	59,682
15	December 8, 1996	St. Louis Rams	W 35–9	FOX 12:00pm	Thom Brennaman & Ron Pitts	45,075
16	December 14, 1996	San Diego Chargers	W 27–14	NBC 3:00pm	Charlie Jones & Randy Cross	49,763
17	December 22, 1996	at Tampa Bay Buccaneers	L 34–19	FOX 12:00pm	Thom Brennaman & Ron Pitts	51,572

=== Standings ===
NFC Central
	W	L	T	PCT	PF	PA	STK
^{(1)} Green Bay Packers	13	3	0	.813	456	210	W5
^{(6)} Minnesota Vikings	9	7	0	.563	298	315	L1
Chicago Bears	7	9	0	.438	283	305	L1
Tampa Bay Buccaneers	6	10	0	.375	221	293	W1
Detroit Lions	5	11	0	.313	302	368	L5
