= 1995 Chicago Bears season =

NFL team season

- Owner: Virginia Halas McCaskey
- Head coach: Dave Wannstedt
- Offensive coordinator: Ron Turner
- Defensive coordinator: Bob Slowik
- Home stadium: Soldier Field

Results
- Record: 9–7
- Division place: 3rd NFC Central
- Playoffs: Did not qualify

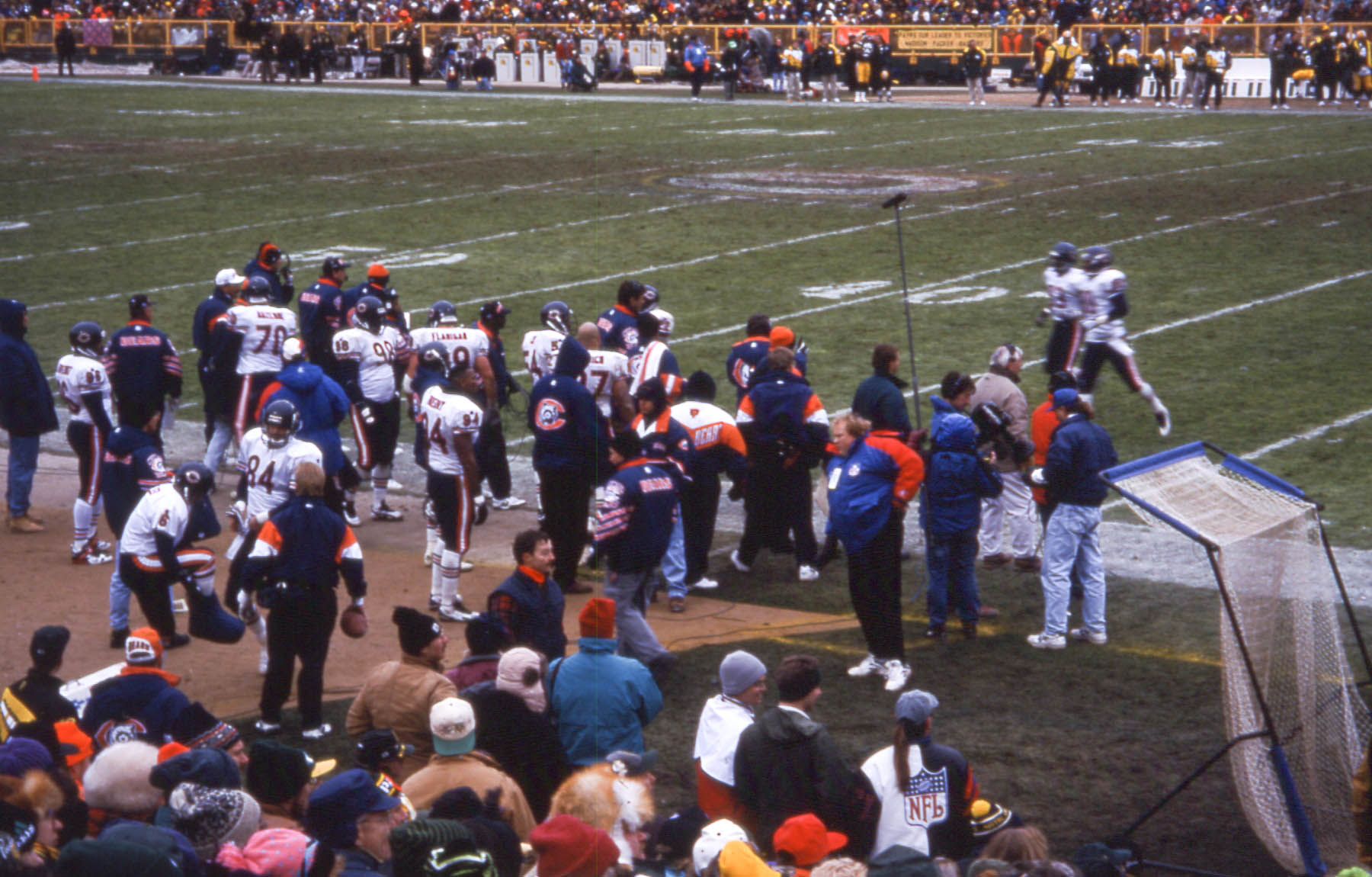
Bears playing the Packers on November 12

The 1995 Chicago Bears season was the franchise's 76th regular season in the National Football League (NFL). The Bears finished with a 9–7 record for the second consecutive year under head coach Dave Wannstedt, but failed to qualify for the playoffs due to a tiebreaker loss to the Atlanta Falcons.

Chicago began the season strong, starting 6–2 at the halfway point. However, a 37–34 overtime home loss to the Pittsburgh Steelers, their first home defeat to Pittsburgh and ended a 10-game home winning streak against them, triggered a three-game losing streak. The Bears went on to lose five of their next six games, falling to 7–7 and effectively eliminating themselves from postseason contention. Bear quarterback Erik Kramer threw for 29 scores on the season, which is a franchise record.

== Offseason ==
Additions	Subtractions
DB Pat Eilers (Redskins)	TE Marv Cook (Rams)
WR Michael Timpson (Patriots)	P Chris Gardocki (Colts)
S Marty Carter (Buccaneers)	LB Dante Jones (Broncos)
	S Shaun Gayle (Chargers)
	DE Trace Armstrong (Dolphins)
	G Mark Bortz (retired)

=== 1995 expansion draft ===
Chicago Bears selected during the expansion draft
Round	Overall	Name	Position	Expansion team
10	19	Tom Myslinski	Guard	Jacksonville Jaguars
14	28	Bob Christian	Running back	Carolina Panthers

=== NFL draft ===
1995 Chicago Bears draft
Round	Pick	Player	Position	College	Notes
1	21	Rashaan Salaam	Running back	Colorado	
2	52	Pat Riley	Defensive end	Miami (FL)	
2	56	Todd Sauerbrun *	Punter	West Virginia	
3	83	Sean Harris	Linebacker	Arizona	
3	87	Evan Pilgrim	Guard	BYU	
4	116	Jack Jackson	Wide receiver	Florida	
6	193	Kenny Gales	Defensive back	Wisconsin	
6	198	Carl Reeves	Defensive end	North Carolina State	
7	229	Jamal Cox	Linebacker	Georgia Tech	
Made roster * Made at least one Pro Bowl during career

=== Undrafted free agents ===
1995 undrafted free agents of note
Player	Position	College
Fabien Bownes	Wide receiver	Western Illinois
Robert Crumpton	Safety	Illinois
Marlon Forbes	Cornerback	Penn State
Lauren Gavin	Linebacker	Jackson State
Bucky Greeley	Center	Penn State
Mark Krichbaum	Defensive Tackle	Virginia
Tim Lewis	Tackle	Northern Illinois
Zev Lumelski	Tackle	Miami (FL)
Pat McNerney	Tight end	Weber State
Octus Polk	Guard	Stephen F. Austin State
Michael Tobias	Defensive Tackle	Southern Miss

== Staff ==
1995 Chicago Bears staff
Front office: Chairman of the Board – Ed McCaskey; President and Chief Executive Officer – Michael McCaskey; Vice President of Operations – Ted Phillips; Director of Player Personnel – Rod Graves; Director of Research and Quality Control – Geep Chryst; Head coaches: Head Coach – Dave Wannstedt; Assistant Head Coach/Offensive Line – Tony Wise; Offensive coaches: Offensive Coordinator/Quarterbacks – Ron Turner; Running backs – Willie Peete; Wide receivers – Ivan Fears; Tight ends – Mike Shula	Defensive coaches: Defensive Coordinator/Defensive backs – Bob Slowik; Defensive line – Clarence Brooks; Linebackers – Dave McGinnis; Defensive Assistant – Carlos Mainord; Special teams coaches: Special Teams – Danny Abramowicz; Strength and conditioning: Strength Coordinator – Clyde Emrich; Physical Development Coordinator – Russ Riederer

== Roster ==
1995 Chicago Bears roster
Quarterbacks (QB): 12 Erik Kramer; 18 Steve Stenstrom; 4 Steve Walsh; Running backs (RB): 30 Tony Carter FB; 38 Mike Faulkerson FB; 43 Dennis Lundy; 31 Rashaan Salaam; 27 Lewis Tillman; Wide receivers (WR): 88 Fabien Bownes; 80 Curtis Conway; 81 Jeff Graham PR; 82 Nate Lewis KR; 83 Michael Timpson KR; Tight ends (TE): 84 Chris Gedney; 85 Keith Jennings; 87 Andre President	Offensive linemen (OL): 72 Scott Adams T; 70 Troy Auzenne T; 63 Todd Burger G; 67 Jerry Fontenot C; 64 Andy Heck T; 58 Jay Leeuwenburg G; 75 Todd Perry G; 65 Evan Pilgrim G; 69 Octus Polk G; 76 Marcus Spears T; 71 James Williams T; Defensive linemen (DL): 99 Jim Flanigan DT; 96 Albert Fontenot DE; 79 Scotty Lewis DE; 78 Pat Riley DT; 98 Carl Simpson DT; 90 Alonzo Spellman DE; 94 John Thierry DE; 97 Chris Zorich DT	Linebackers (LB): 91 Myron Baker OLB; 59 Joe Cain MLB; 54 Ron Cox OLB; 55 Sean Harris OLB; 92 Barry Minter MLB; 55 Vinson Smith OLB; Defensive backs (DB): 20 Mark Carrier FS; 23 Marty Carter SS; 25 Pat Eilers FS; 37 Keshon Johnson CB; 32 Dwayne Joseph CB; 39 Jeremy Lincoln CB; 26 John Mangum FS; 36 Anthony Marshall CB/S; 24 Kevin Miniefield CB; 21 Donnell Woolford CB; Special teams (ST): 6 Kevin Butler K; 16 Todd Sauerbrun P	Practice squad: 33 Brandon Bennett RB; 86 Mill Coleman WR; 93 Ervin Collier DT; 46 Marlon Forbes CB; Reserve: 35 James Burton CB (IR); 48 Kenny Gales CB (PUP); 22 Robert Green RB (IR); 29 Raymont Harris RB (IR); 82 Jack Jackson WR (IR); 68 Carl Reeves DE (IR); 89 Ryan Wetnight TE (IR); 53 active, 7 inactive, 4 practice squad Rookies in italics

== Regular season ==
=== Schedule ===
Week	Date	Opponent	Result	Record	Venue	Recap
1	September 3	Minnesota Vikings	W 31–14	1–0	Soldier Field	Recap
2	September 11	Green Bay Packers	L 24–27	1–1	Soldier Field	Recap
3	September 17	at Tampa Bay Buccaneers	W 25–6	2–1	Tampa Stadium	Recap
4	September 24	at St. Louis Rams	L 28–34	2–2	Busch Memorial Stadium	Recap
5	Bye					
6	October 8	Carolina Panthers	W 31–27	3–2	Soldier Field	Recap
7	October 15	at Jacksonville Jaguars	W 30–27	4–2	Jacksonville Municipal Stadium	Recap
8	October 22	Houston Oilers	W 35–32	5–2	Soldier Field	Recap
9	October 30	at Minnesota Vikings	W 14–6	6–2	Hubert H. Humphrey Metrodome	Recap
10	November 5	Pittsburgh Steelers	L 34–37 (OT)	6–3	Soldier Field	Recap
11	November 12	at Green Bay Packers	L 28–35	6–4	Lambeau Field	Recap
12	November 19	Detroit Lions	L 17–24	6–5	Soldier Field	Recap
13	November 26	at New York Giants	W 27–24	7–5	Giants Stadium	Recap
14	December 4	at Detroit Lions	L 7–27	7–6	Pontiac Silverdome	Recap
15	December 10	at Cincinnati Bengals	L 10–16	7–7	Riverfront Stadium	Recap
16	December 17	Tampa Bay Buccaneers	W 31–10	8–7	Soldier Field	Recap
17	December 24	Philadelphia Eagles	W 20–14	9–7	Soldier Field	Recap

=== Standings ===
NFC Central
	W	L	T	PCT	PF	PA	STK
^{(3)} Green Bay Packers	11	5	0	.688	404	314	W2
^{(5)} Detroit Lions	10	6	0	.625	436	336	W7
Chicago Bears	9	7	0	.563	392	360	W2
Minnesota Vikings	8	8	0	.500	412	385	L2
Tampa Bay Buccaneers	7	9	0	.438	238	335	L2
