= 1994 Chicago Bears season =

NFL team season

- Head coach: Dave Wannstedt
- Offensive coordinator: Ron Turner
- Defensive coordinator: Bob Slowik
- Home stadium: Soldier Field

Results
- Record: 9–7
- Division place: 4th NFC Central
- Playoffs: Won Wild Card Playoffs (at Vikings) 35–18; Lost Divisional Playoffs (at 49ers) 15–44

The 1994 Chicago Bears season was their 75th regular season completed in the National Football League (NFL). The Bears finished with a 9–7 record under head coach Dave Wannstedt for their first winning season since the end of the 1991 season. The club was one of four teams from the NFC Central to make the playoffs. This was also the NFL's 75th Anniversary so the Bears wore 1920s-era throwback jerseys in a few games. The Bears celebrated their first playoff win since January 6, 1991, with a hard-fought road victory over the NFC Central champion Minnesota Vikings 35–18 before being knocked out by the eventual Super Bowl champion San Francisco 49ers 44–15 at Candlestick Park.

This season was the Bears' final playoff appearance until 2001, and last playoff victory until 2006, marking the beginning of a period of under performance for the franchise.

== Offseason ==
Additions	Subtractions
TE Marv Cook (Patriots)	DT Steve McMichael (Packers)
QB Erik Kramer (Lions)	QB Jim Harbaugh (Colts)
QB Steve Walsh (Saints)	DE Richard Dent (49ers)
T Andy Heck (Seahawks)	
WR Nate Lewis (Chargers)	
RB Lewis Tillman (Giants)	

=== NFL draft ===
1994 Chicago Bears draft
Round	Pick	Player	Position	College	Notes
1	11	John Thierry	Defensive end	Alcorn State	
2	39	Marcus Spears	Offensive tackle	Northwestern State	
3	74	Jim Flanigan	Defensive tackle	Notre Dame	
4	114	Raymont Harris	Running back	Ohio State	
6	170	Lloyd Hill	Wide receiver	Texas Tech	
7	205	Dennis Collier	Defensive back	Colorado	
Made roster

=== Undrafted free agents ===
1994 undrafted free agents of note
Player	Position	College
Robert Bass	Linebacker	Miami (FL)
Donny Brooks	Cornerback	Texas Tech
Arthur Bussie	Defensive end	Northeast Louisiana
Tony Carter	Fullback	Minnesota
Josh Dunning	Guard	Washington State
Marcus Durgin	Cornerback	Samford
Matt Frier	Wide receiver	Florida State
Michael Hightower	Running back	East Texas State
Darwin Ireland	Linebacker	Arkansas
Anthony Marshall	Cornerback	LSU
John Martin	Running back	Memphis
Todd Norman	Tackle	Notre Dame
Steve Sanders	Wide receiver	Virginia Tech
Oscar Shorten	Defensive tackle	Abilene Christian
Aubrey Thompson	Tight end	Utah State
Cedric Walker	Safety	Stephen F. Austin

== Staff ==
1994 Chicago Bears staff
Front office: Chairman of the Board – Ed McCaskey; President and Chief Executive Officer – Michael McCaskey; Vice President of Operations – Ted Phillips; Director of player personnel – Rod Graves; Director of Research and Quality Control – Geep Chryst; Head coaches: Head coach – Dave Wannstedt; Offensive coaches: Offensive coordinator/Quarterbacks – Ron Turner; Running Backs – Joe Pendry; Wide receivers – Ivan Fears; Tight ends – Mike Shula; Offensive line – Tony Wise	Defensive coaches: Defensive coordinator/Defensive Backs – Bob Slowik; Defensive line – Clarence Brooks; Linebackers – Dave McGinnis; Defensive assistant – Carlos Mainord; Special teams coaches: Special teams – Danny Abramowicz; Strength and conditioning: Strength Coordinator – Clyde Emrich; Physical Development Coordinator – Russ Riederer

== Roster ==
1994 Chicago Bears roster
Quarterbacks (QB): 12 Erik Kramer; 9 Shane Matthews; 4 Steve Walsh; Running backs (RB): 30 Tony Carter; 43 Trevor Cobb; 22 Robert Green; 29 Raymont Harris FB; 27 Lewis Tillman; Wide receivers (WR): 80 Curtis Conway; 81 Jeff Graham PR; 82 Nate Lewis KR; 88 Greg McMurtry; 18 Greg Primus; 19 Kenny Shedd; 87 Tom Waddle; Tight ends (TE): 86 Marv Cook; 85 Keith Jennings; 89 Ryan Wetnight	Offensive linemen (OL): 70 Troy Auzenne T; 62 Mark Bortz G; 63 Todd Burger G; 67 Jerry Fontenot C; 64 Andy Heck T; 58 Jay Leeuwenburg G; 69 Tom Myslinski G; 75 Todd Perry G; 76 Marcus Spears T; 71 James Williams T; Defensive linemen (DL): 93 Trace Armstrong DE; 65 Tory Epps DT; 99 Jim Flanigan DT; 96 Albert Fontenot DT; 98 Carl Simpson DT; 90 Alonzo Spellman DE; 94 John Thierry DE; 97 Chris Zorich DT	Linebackers (LB): 91 Myron Baker OLB; 59 Joe Cain OLB; 54 Ron Cox OLB; 53 Dante Jones MLB; 92 Barry Minter MLB; 55 Vinson Smith OLB; Defensive backs (DB): 35 James Burton CB; 20 Mark Carrier FS; 37 Maurice Douglass S; 23 Shaun Gayle SS; 39 Jeremy Lincoln CB; 26 John Mangum CB/S; 36 Anthony Marshall FS; 24 Kevin Miniefield CB; 21 Donnell Woolford CB; Special teams (ST): 6 Kevin Butler K; 17 Chris Gardocki P	Practice squad: 68 Ervin Collier DT; 60 Darwin Ireland LB; 32 Dwayne Joseph CB; 72 Todd Norman G; Reserve: 52 Robert Bass LB (IR); 44 Bob Christian FB (IR); 84 Chris Gedney TE (IR); 74 Garland Hawkins DE (IR); 33 Merril Hoge (IR); 83 Terry Obee WR (IR); 38 Tim Worley RB (NF-Ill.); 53 active, 7 inactive, 4 practice squad Rookies in italics

== Regular season ==
=== Schedule ===
Week	Date	Opponent	Result	TV	TV Announcers	Attendance
1	September 4, 1994	Tampa Bay Buccaneers	W 21–9	Fox	Joe Buck, Tim Green	61,844
2	September 12, 1994	at Philadelphia Eagles	L 30–22	ABC	Al Michaels, Frank Gifford, Dan Dierdorf, Lynn Swann	64,890
3	September 18, 1994	Minnesota Vikings	L 42–14	Fox	Kevin Harlan, Jerry Glanville	61,073
4	September 25, 1994	at New York Jets	W 19–7	TNT	Gary Bender, Pat Haden, Kevin Kiley	70,806
5	October 2, 1994	Buffalo Bills	W 20–13	NBC	Dick Enberg, Bob Trumpy, Hannah Storm	62,406
6	October 9, 1994	New Orleans Saints	W 17–7	Fox	Kevin Harlan, Jerry Glanville	63,822
7	Bye					
8	October 23, 1994	at Detroit Lions	L 21–16	Fox	Dick Stockton, Matt Millen	73,574
9	October 31, 1994	Green Bay Packers	L 33–6	ABC	Al Michaels, Frank Gifford, Dan Dierdorf, Lynn Swann	47,381
10	November 6, 1994	at Tampa Bay Buccaneers	W 20–6	Fox	Joe Buck, Tim Green	60,821
11	November 13, 1994	at Miami Dolphins	W 17–14	Fox	Dick Stockton, Matt Millen, Ron Pitts	64,871
12	November 20, 1994	Detroit Lions	W 20–10	Fox	Kevin Harlan, Jerry Glanville	55,035
13	November 27, 1994	at Arizona Cardinals	W 19–16 (OT)	Fox	Kevin Harlan, Jerry Glanville	65,922
14	December 1, 1994	at Minnesota Vikings	L 33–27 (OT)	ESPN	Mike Patrick, Joe Theismann, Mark Malone	61,483
15	December 11, 1994	at Green Bay Packers	L 40–3	Fox	Joe Buck, Tim Green, Dan Jiggetts	57,927
16	December 18, 1994	Los Angeles Rams	W 27–13	Fox	Kevin Harlan, Jerry Glanville, Kevin Frazier	56,276
17	December 24, 1994	New England Patriots	L 13–3	NBC	Marv Albert, Paul Maguire, Will McDonough	60,178

=== Standings ===
NFC Central
	W	L	T	PCT	PF	PA	STK
^{(3)} Minnesota Vikings	10	6	0	.625	356	314	W1
^{(4)} Green Bay Packers	9	7	0	.563	382	287	W3
^{(5)} Detroit Lions	9	7	0	.563	357	342	L1
^{(6)} Chicago Bears	9	7	0	.563	271	307	L1
Tampa Bay Buccaneers	6	10	0	.375	251	351	L1

== Playoffs ==
Week	Date	Opponent	Result	TV	TV Announcers	Attendance
Wild Card	January 1, 1995	at Minnesota Vikings	W 35–18	Fox	Pat Summerall, John Madden, Matt Millen, Anthony Muñoz	60,347
Division	January 7, 1995	at San Francisco 49ers	L 44–15	Fox	Dick Stockton, Matt Millen, Tim Green	64,644
