= 1993 Chicago Bears season =

NFL team season

- Head coach: Dave Wannstedt
- Home stadium: Soldier Field

Results
- Record: 7–9
- Division place: 4th NFC Central
- Playoffs: Did not qualify

The 1993 Chicago Bears season was their 74th regular season completed in the National Football League (NFL). It was the Bears' first season since 1981 without Mike Ditka as head coach, as he had been fired following the team's 5–11 finish the year before. This for the first time since 1980 Mike Singletary was not on the opening day roster. Under new head coach Dave Wannstedt, the Bears improved their record to 7–9 but again failed to make the playoffs.

The 1993 season would be the last for a number of contributors of the Bears' Super Bowl XX team of eight years earlier in Chicago uniforms; as following the season, offensive tackle Keith Van Horne retired, while defensive tackle Steve McMichael and defensive end Richard Dent left for Green Bay and San Francisco, respectively (though Dent would return to Chicago for 1995). Additionally; Neal Anderson, a 4-time Pro-Bowler who succeeded Walter Payton as the team's starting running back, retired after the season, while quarterback Jim Harbaugh would leave for Indianapolis.

== Offseason ==
| Additions | Subtractions |
|---|---|
| FB Craig Heyward (Saints) | LB Ron Rivera (retirement) |
| CB Anthony Blaylock (Chargers) | LB Mike Singletary (retirement) |
| LB Vinson Smith (Cowboys) | FB Brad Muster (Saints) |
| LB Barry Minter (Cowboys) | G Tom Thayer (Dolphins) |
| LB Joe Cain (Seahawks) | LB John Roper (Cowboys) |
| | TE Kelly Blackwell (Cowboys) |
| | S David Tate (Giants) |
| | TE James Thornton (Jets) |
| | CB Lemuel Stinson (Falcons) |

=== NFL draft ===
1993 Chicago Bears draft
| Round | Pick | Player | Position | College | Notes |
| 1 | 7 | Curtis Conway | Wide receiver | USC | |
| 2 | 35 | Carl Simpson | Defensive tackle | Florida State | |
| 3 | 61 | Chris Gedney | Tight end | Syracuse | |
| 4 | 97 | Todd Perry | Guard | Kentucky | |
| 4 | 100 | Myron Baker | Linebacker | Louisiana Tech | |
| 4 | 112 | Albert Fontenot | Defensive end | Baylor | |
| 6 | 146 | Dave Hoffmann | Linebacker | Washington | |
| 7 | 173 | Keshon Johnson | Cornerback | Arizona | |
Made roster

=== Undrafted free agents ===
1993 undrafted free agents of note
| Player | Position | College |
|---|---|---|
| Scott Bonnell | Kicker | Indiana |
| Dewell Brewer | Running back | Oklahoma |
| Todd Burger | Guard | Penn State |
| John Ellisor | Guard | Texas A&M |
| Carlos Fleeks | Running back | Hampton |
| Matt Goodwin | Cornerback | Iowa State |
| Garland Hawkins | Linebacker | Syracuse |
| John Ivlow | Fullback | Colorado State |
| Antonio Johnson | Wide receiver | Syracuse |
| Rico Mack | Linebacker | Appalachian State |
| Shane Matthews | Quarterback | Florida |
| Maurice Miller | Linebacker | Wake Forest |
| Tony Nichols | Tackle | San Diego State |
| Tracy Saul | Safety | Texas Tech |
| Ryan Wetnight | Tight end | Stanford |
| Kenny Wilhite | Cornerback | Nebraska |

== Staff ==
1993 Chicago Bears staff
| Front office: Chairman of the Board – Ed McCaskey; President and Chief Executive Officer – Michael McCaskey; Vice President of Operations – Ted Phillips; Director of College Scouting – Rod Graves; Director of Research and Quality Control – Geep Chryst; Head coaches: Head Coach – Dave Wannstedt; Offensive coaches: Offensive Coordinator/Quarterbacks – Ron Turner; Running Backs – Joe Pendry; Wide Receivers – Ivan Fears; Tight Ends – Mike Shula; Offensive Line – Tony Wise | Defensive coaches: Defensive Coordinator/Defensive Backs – Bob Slowik; Defensive Line – Clarence Brooks; Linebackers – Dave McGinnis; Defensive Assistant – Carlos Mainord; Special teams coaches: Special Teams – Danny Abramowicz; Strength and conditioning: Strength Coordinator – Clyde Emrich; Physical Development Coordinator – Russ Riederer |

== Roster ==
1993 Chicago Bears roster
| Quarterbacks (QB): 4 Jim Harbaugh; 9 Shane Matthews; 10 Peter Tom Willis; Running backs (RB): 35 Neal Anderson; 44 Bob Christian FB; 22 Robert Green KR; 45 Craig Heyward FB; 38 Tim Worley; Wide receivers (WR): 81 Anthony Brooks; 80 Curtis Conway KR; 83 Terry Obee; 87 Tom Waddle; Tight ends (TE): 84 Chris Gedney; 85 Keith Jennings; 89 Ryan Wetnight | Offensive linemen (OL): 70 Troy Auzenne T; 62 Mark Bortz G; 63 Todd Burger G; 67 Jerry Fontenot C; 58 Jay Leeuwenburg T; 60 Gene McGuire C; 69 Tom Myslinski G; 75 Todd Perry G/T; 78 Keith Van Horne T; 71 James Williams T; 73 John Wojciechowski G; Defensive linemen (DL): 93 Trace Armstrong DE; 95 Richard Dent DE; 65 Tory Epps DT; 74 Albert Fontenot DE; 76 Steve McMichael DT; 99 Tim Ryan DT; 98 Carl Simpson DT; 90 Alonzo Spellman DE; 97 Chris Zorich DT | Linebackers (LB): 91 Myron Baker OLB; 59 Joe Cain OLB; 54 Ron Cox OLB; 53 Dante Jones MLB; 92 Barry Minter MLB; 55 Vinson Smith OLB; 96 Percy Snow MLB; Defensive backs (DB): 47 Anthony Blaylock CB; 20 Mark Carrier FS; 37 Maurice Douglass FS; 23 Shaun Gayle SS; 38 Keshon Johnson CB; 39 Jeremy Lincoln CB; 26 John Mangum SS; 24 Kevin Miniefield CB; 21 Donnell Woolford CB; Special teams (ST): 6 Kevin Butler K; 17 Chris Gardocki P | Practice squad: 86 Willie Harris WR; 94 Frank Kmet DE; 52 Jim Schwantz LB; Reserve: 82 Wendell Davis WR (IR); 88 Glen Kozlowski WR (IR); 64 Tony Nichols T (IR); 53 active, 3 inactive, 3 practice squad Rookies in italics |

== Regular season ==
=== Schedule ===
| Week | Date | Opponent | Result | Attendance |
|---|---|---|---|---|
| 1 | September 5, 1993 | New York Giants | L 26–20 | 66,900 |
| 2 | September 12, 1993 | at Minnesota Vikings | L 10–7 | 57,921 |
| 3 | Bye | | | |
| 4 | September 26, 1993 | Tampa Bay Buccaneers | W 47–17 | 58,329 |
| 5 | October 3, 1993 | Atlanta Falcons | W 6–0 | 57,441 |
| 6 | October 10, 1993 | at Philadelphia Eagles | W 17–6 | 63,601 |
| 7 | Bye | | | |
| 8 | October 25, 1993 | Minnesota Vikings | L 19–12 | 64,677 |
| 9 | October 31, 1993 | at Green Bay Packers | L 17–3 | 58,945 |
| 10 | November 7, 1993 | Los Angeles Raiders | L 16–14 | 59,750 |
| 11 | November 14, 1993 | at San Diego Chargers | W 16–13 | 58,459 |
| 12 | November 21, 1993 | at Kansas City Chiefs | W 19–17 | 76,872 |
| 13 | November 25, 1993 | at Detroit Lions | W 10–6 | 76,699 |
| 14 | December 5, 1993 | Green Bay Packers | W 30–17 | 62,236 |
| 15 | December 12, 1993 | at Tampa Bay Buccaneers | L 13–10 | 56,667 |
| 16 | December 18, 1993 | Denver Broncos | L 13–3 | 53,056 |
| 17 | December 26, 1993 | Detroit Lions | L 20–14 | 43,443 |
| 18 | January 2, 1994 | at Los Angeles Rams | L 20–6 | 39,147 |

=== Game summaries ===
==== Week 1 ====
| Team | 1 | 2 | 3 | 4 | Total |
|---|---|---|---|---|---|
| • Giants | 3 | 6 | 7 | 10 | 26 |
| Bears | 0 | 7 | 10 | 3 | 20 |

- Date: September 5
- Location: Soldier Field, Chicago, Illinois
- Game start: 3:00 p.m.
- Game weather: 66 °F (19 °C); Wind 10 mph (16 km/h)

==== Week 2 ====
| Team | 1 | 2 | 3 | 4 | Total |
|---|---|---|---|---|---|
| Bears | 7 | 0 | 0 | 0 | 7 |
| • Vikings | 0 | 3 | 0 | 7 | 10 |

- Date: September 12
- Location: Hubert H. Humphrey Metrodome, Minneapolis, Minnesota
- Game start: 12:00 p.m.
- Game weather: Indoors (dome)

==== Week 4 ====
| Team | 1 | 2 | 3 | 4 | Total |
|---|---|---|---|---|---|
| Buccaneers | 3 | 7 | 0 | 7 | 17 |
| • Bears | 0 | 28 | 3 | 16 | 47 |

- Date: September 26
- Location: Soldier Field, Chicago, Illinois
- Game start: 12:00 p.m.
- Game weather: 57 °F (14 °C); Wind 14 mph (23 km/h)

Scoring summary
| 1 | TB | Michael Husted 20 yard field goal | TB 3–0 |
| 2 | CHI | Neal Anderson 1 yard run (Kevin Butler kick) | CHI 7–3 |
| 2 | CHI | Jim Harbaugh 1 yard run (Kevin Butler kick) | CHI 14–3 |
| 2 | CHI | Ryan Wetnight 25 yard pass from Jim Harbaugh (Kevin Butler kick) | CHI 21–3 |
| 2 | CHI | Tom Waddle 17 yard pass from Jim Harbaugh (Kevin Butler kick) | CHI 28–3 |
| 2 | TB | Lamar Thomas 62 yard pass from Craig Erickson (Michael Husted kick) | CHI 28–10 |
| 3 | CHI | Kevin Butler 33 yard field goal | CHI 31–10 |
| 4 | CHI | Kevin Butler 40 yard field goal | CHI 34–10 |
| 4 | CHI | Myron Baker 8 yard fumble return (Kevin Butler kick) | CHI 41–10 |
| 4 | CHI | Kevin Butler 32 yard field goal | CHI 44–10 |
| 4 | TB | Anthony McDowell 3 yard pass from Steve DeBerg (Michael Husted kick) | CHI 44–17 |
| 4 | CHI | Kevin Butler 31 yard field goal | CHI 47–17 |

== Standings ==
NFC Central
| | W | L | T | PCT | PF | PA | STK |
|---|---|---|---|---|---|---|---|
| ^{(3)} Detroit Lions | 10 | 6 | 0 | .625 | 298 | 292 | W2 |
| ^{(5)} Minnesota Vikings | 9 | 7 | 0 | .563 | 277 | 290 | W3 |
| ^{(6)} Green Bay Packers | 9 | 7 | 0 | .563 | 340 | 282 | L1 |
| Chicago Bears | 7 | 9 | 0 | .438 | 234 | 230 | L4 |
| Tampa Bay Buccaneers | 5 | 11 | 0 | .313 | 237 | 376 | L1 |
