= 1997 Chicago Bears season =

NFL team season

- Owner: Virginia Halas McCaskey
- Head coach: Dave Wannstedt
- Offensive coordinator: Matt Cavanaugh
- Defensive coordinator: Bob Slowik
- Home stadium: Soldier Field

Results
- Record: 4–12
- Division place: 5th NFC Central
- Playoffs: Did not qualify

The 1997 Chicago Bears season was their 78th regular season completed in the National Football League (NFL). The team finished with a 4–12 record under head coach Dave Wannstedt and missed the playoffs for a third consecutive year. It was the team's first 4-win season since they posted a 4–10 record in 1975. It was also the second time where the Bears were the only team from the NFC Central to not make the playoffs. The first time this scenario occurred was in the strike-shortened 1982 season. The Bears defense struggled mightily throughout the season, allowing a franchise-record 421 points in 1997.

== Offseason ==
Additions	Subtractions
WR Ricky Proehl (Seahawks)	WR Michael Timpson (Eagles)
LB Ron Cox (Packers)	S Mark Carrier (Lions)
DE Mark Thomas (Panthers)	C Rob Davis (Packers)
G Chris Gray (Dolphins)	DT Chris Zorich (Redskins)
TE Harper LeBel (Falcons)	DB Kevin Miniefield (Cardinals)
T Jimmy Herndon (Jaguars)	CB Donnell Woolford (Steelers)
WR Chris Penn (Chiefs)	
G Casey Wiegmann (Jets)	
DB Ricky Bell (Jaguars)	
DB Tyrone Hughes (Saints)	

=== NFL draft ===
1997 Chicago Bears draft
Round	Pick	Player	Position	College	Notes
2	38	John Allred	Tight end	USC	
3	69	Bob Sapp	Guard	Washington	
4	105	Darnell Autry	Running back	Northwestern	
4	108	Marcus Robinson	Wide receiver	South Carolina	
5	141	Van Hiles	Defensive back	Kentucky	
6	196	Shawn Swayda	Defensive end	Arizona State	
6	200	Richard Hogans	Linebacker	Memphis	
6	201	Ricky Parker	Defensive back	San Diego State	
7	210	Mike Miano	Defensive tackle	Missouri State	
7	233	Marvin Thomas	Defensive end	Memphis	
Made roster

== Staff ==
1997 Chicago Bears staff
Front office: Chairman of the board – Ed McCaskey; President and chief executive officer – Michael McCaskey; Vice-president of operations – Ted Phillips; Vice-president of player personnel – Mark Hatley; Director of college scouting – Bill Rees; Director of pro personnel – Rick Spielman; Director of research and quality control – Eric Studesville; Head coaches: Head coach – Dave Wannstedt; Assistant head coach – Tony Wise; Offensive coaches: Offensive coordinator/quarterbacks – Matt Cavanaugh; Running backs – Willie Peete; Wide receivers – Ivan Fears; Tight ends – Ted Plumb; Offensive line – Tony Wise	Defensive coaches: Defensive coordinator/linebackers – Bob Slowik; Defensive line – Clarence Brooks; Defensive backs – Carlos Mainord; Defensive assistant – Greg Schiano; Special teams coaches: Special teams – Keith Armstrong; Strength and conditioning: Physical development coordinator – Russ Riederer; Assistant physical development coordinator – Steve Little

== Roster ==
1997 Chicago Bears roster
Quarterbacks (QB): 12 Erik Kramer; 13 Rick Mirer; 18 Steve Stenstrom; Running backs (RB): 20 James Allen; 21 Darnell Autry; 30 Tony Carter FB; 38 Mike Dulaney FB; 22 Ronnie Harmon; 44 Michael Hicks; Wide receivers (WR): 82 Fabien Bownes KR; 80 Curtis Conway; 81 Bobby Engram; 86 Chris Penn; 87 Ricky Proehl PR; 83 Eric Smith KR; Tight ends (TE): 49 Tremayne Allen; 84 John Allred; 89 Ryan Wetnight	Offensive linemen (OL): 63 Todd Burger G; 62 Chris Gray G; 64 Andy Heck T; 74 Jimmy Herndon T; 67 Greg Huntington G; 58 Chris Villarrial C/G; 60 Casey Wiegmann C; 71 James Williams T; Defensive linemen (DL): 99 Jim Flanigan DT; 93 Paul Grasmanis DT; 68 Carl Reeves DE; 98 Carl Simpson DT; 90 Alonzo Spellman DE; 95 Mark Thomas DE; 96 Tyrone Williams DT	Linebackers (LB): 59 Daryl Carter OLB; 52 Bryan Cox MLB; 54 Ron Cox OLB; 55 Sean Harris OLB; 53 Michael Lowery OLB; 92 Barry Minter OLB; 57 Tony Peterson MLB; Defensive backs (DB): 23 Marty Carter SS; 25 Tom Carter CB; 24 Terry Cousin CB; 46 Marlon Forbes SS; 27 Walt Harris CB; 48 Van Hiles FS; 35 Clyde Johnson CB; 26 John Mangum FS; 45 Tony Stargell CB; Special teams (ST): 33 Tyrone Hughes; 1 Jeff Jaeger K; 88 Harper LeBel LS; 16 Todd Sauerbrun P	Practice squad: 97 Mark Lee DE; 15 Chris Miller WR; 73 Emmett Zitelli C; Reserve: 32 Ricky Bell CB (NF-Inj.); 29 Raymont Harris RB (IR); 94 Rich Hogans LB (IR); 75 Todd Perry G (IR); 19 Marcus Robinson WR (IR); 31 Rashaan Salaam RB (IR); 91 John Thierry DE (IR); 53 active, 7 inactive, 3 practice squad Rookies in italics

== Regular season ==
=== Schedule ===
Week	Date	Opponent	Result	Record	Venue	Attendance
1	September 1	at **Green Bay Packers**	**L** 24–38	0–1	Lambeau Field	60,766
2	September 7	**Minnesota Vikings**	**L** 24–27	0–2	Soldier Field	59,263
3	September 14	**Detroit Lions**	**L** 7–32	0–3	Soldier Field	59,147
4	September 21	at New England Patriots	**L** 3–31	0–4	Foxboro Stadium	59,873
5	September 28	at Dallas Cowboys	**L** 3–27	0–5	Texas Stadium	64,082
6	October 5	New Orleans Saints	**L** 17–20	0–6	Soldier Field	58,865
7	October 12	**Green Bay Packers**	**L** 23–24	0–7	Soldier Field	62,212
8	Bye					
9	October 27	at Miami Dolphins	**W** 36–33 (OT)	1–7	Pro Player Stadium	73,156
10	November 2	Washington Redskins	**L** 8–31	1–8	Soldier Field	53,052
11	November 9	at **Minnesota Vikings**	**L** 22–29	1–9	Hubert H. Humphrey Metrodome	63,443
12	November 16	New York Jets	**L** 15–23	1–10	Soldier Field	45,642
13	November 23	**Tampa Bay Buccaneers**	**W** 13–7	2–10	Soldier Field	43,955
14	November 27	at **Detroit Lions**	**L** 20–55	2–11	Pontiac Silverdome	77,904
15	December 7	Buffalo Bills	**W** 20–3	3–11	Soldier Field	39,784
16	December 14	at St. Louis Rams	**W** 13–10	4–11	Trans World Dome	66,030
17	December 21	at **Tampa Bay Buccaneers**	**L** 15–31	4–12	Houlihan's Stadium	70,930

Note: Intra-division opponents are in bold text.

=== Standings ===
NFC Central
	W	L	T	PCT	PF	PA	STK
^{(2)} Green Bay Packers	13	3	0	.813	422	282	W5
^{(4)} Tampa Bay Buccaneers	10	6	0	.625	299	263	W1
^{(5)} Detroit Lions	9	7	0	.563	379	306	W2
^{(6)} Minnesota Vikings	9	7	0	.563	354	359	W1
Chicago Bears	4	12	0	.250	263	421	L1

== Game summaries ==
=== Week 1: at Green Bay Packers ===
Week One: Chicago Bears at Green Bay Packers – Game summary

Quarter	1	2	3	4	Total
Bears	0	11	0	13	24
Packers	3	15	6	14	38

at Lambeau Field, Green Bay, Wisconsin

- Date: September 1
- Game time: 7:00 p.m. CDT
- Game weather: 69 °F (21 °C)
- Game attendance: 60,766
- TV announcers (ABC): Al Michaels, Dan Dierdorf and Lynn Swann
- Box score

Game information

First quarter

- GB – Ryan Longwell 38-yard field goal. Packers 3–0.

Second quarter

- CHI – Raymont Harris 1-yard run (Todd Sauerbrun pass to Jim Flanigan). Bears 8–3.
- GB – Jeff Thomason 1-yard pass from Brett Favre (Brett Favre pass to Dorsey Levens). Packers 11–8.
- CHI – Jeff Jaeger 42-yard field goal. Tied 11–11.
- GB – Robert Brooks 18-yard pass from Brett Favre (Ryan Longwell kick). Packers 18–11.

Third quarter

- GB – Ryan Longwell 36-yard field goal. Packers 21–11.
- GB – Ryan Longwell 29-yard field goal. Packers 24–11.

Fourth quarter

- GB – Dorsey Levens 1-yard run (Ryan Longwell kick). Packers 31–11.
- CHI – Ricky Proehl 22-yard pass from Erik Kramer (pass failed). Packers 31–17.
- GB – Gabe Wilkins 1-yard fumble return (Ryan Longwell kick). Packers 38–17.
- CHI – Raymond Harris 68-yard run (Jeff Jaeger kick). Packers 38–24.

Top passers

- CHI – Erik Kramer – 17/41, 192 yards, TD, 2 INT
- GB – Brett Favre – 15/22, 226 yards, 2 TD, INT

Top rushers

- CHI – Raymont Harris – 13 rushes, 122 yards, 2 TD
- GB – Dorsey Levens – 22 rushes, 80 yards, TD

Top receivers

- CHI – Raymont Harris – 4 receptions, 36 yards
- GB – Robert Brooks – 3 receptions, 71 yards, TD

=== Week 2: vs. Minnesota Vikings ===
Week Two: Minnesota Vikings at Chicago Bears – Game summary

Quarter	1	2	3	4	Total
Vikings	3	0	10	14	27
Bears	0	10	7	7	24

at Soldier Field, Chicago, Illinois

- Date: September 7
- Game time: 12:00 p.m. CDT
- Game weather: 69 °F (21 °C)
- Game attendance: 59,263
- TV: Fox
- Box score

Game information

First quarter

- MIN – Greg Davis 33-yard field goal. Vikings 3–0.

Second quarter

- CHI – Jeff Jaeger 39-yard field goal. Tied 3–3.
- CHI – Ricky Proehl 25-yard pass from Erik Kramer (Jeff Jaeger kick). Bears 10–3.

Third quarter

- MIN – Greg Davis 28-yard field goal. Bears 10–6.
- MIN – Orlando Thomas 22-yard fumble return (Greg Davis kick). Vikings 13–10.
- CHI – Bobby Engram 10-yard pass from Erik Kramer (Jeff Jaeger kick). Bears 17–13.

Fourth quarter

- MIN – Jake Reed 21-yard pass from Brad Johnson (Greg Davis kick). Vikings 20–17.
- CHI – Raymont Harris 59-yard run (Jeff Jaeger kick). Bears 24–20.
- MIN – Chris Walsh 9-yard pass from Brad Johnson (Greg Davis kick). Vikings 27–24.

Top passers

- MIN – Brad Johnson – 33/44, 285 yards, 2 TD, INT
- CHI – Erik Kramer – 21/36, 174 yards, 2 TD

Top rushers

- MIN – Robert Smith – 13 rushes, 85 yards
- CHI – Raymont Harris – 8 rushes, 77 yards, TD

Top receivers

- MIN – Jake Reed – 12 receptions, 118 yards, TD
- CHI – Bobby Engram – 6 receptions, 63 yards, TD

=== Week 3: vs. Detroit Lions ===
Week Three: Detroit Lions at Chicago Bears – Game summary

Quarter	1	2	3	4	Total
Lions	3	10	10	9	32
Bears	7	0	0	0	7

at Soldier Field, Chicago, Illinois

- Date: September 14
- Game time: 12:00 p.m. CDT
- Game weather: 69 °F (21 °C)
- Game attendance: 59,147
- TV: Fox
- Box score

=== Week 4: at New England Patriots ===
Week Four: Chicago Bears at New England Patriots – Game summary

Quarter	1	2	3	4	Total
Bears	0	0	3	0	3
Patriots	7	7	0	17	31

at Foxboro Stadium, Foxborough, Massachusetts

- Date: September 21
- Game time: 12:00 p.m. CDT/1:00 p.m. EDT
- Game weather: 56 °F (13 °C)
- Game attendance: 59,873
- TV: Fox
- Box score

Game information

First quarter

- NE – Vincent Brisby 7-yard pass from Drew Bledsoe (Adam Vinatieri kick). Patriots 7–0.

Second quarter

- NE – Troy Brown 52-yard pass from Drew Bledsoe (Adam Vinatieri kick). Patriots 14–0.

Third quarter

- CHI – Jeff Jaeger 38-yard field goal. Patriots 14–3.

Fourth quarter

- NE – Adam Vinatieri 27-yard field goal. Patriots 17–3.
- NE – Curtis Martin 70-yard run (Adam Vinatieri kick). Patriots 24–3.
- NE – Lovett Purnell 20-yard pass from Scott Zolak (Adam Vinatieri kick). Patriots 31–3.

Top passers

- CHI – Rick Mirer – 17/25, 154 yards, 2 INT
- NE – Drew Bledsoe – 24/37, 301 yards, 2 TD, INT

Top rushers

- CHI – Raymont Harris – 21 rushes, 63 yards
- NE – Curtis Martin – 14 rushes, 79 yards, TD

Top receivers

- CHI – Bobby Engram – 5 receptions, 47 yards
- NE – Troy Brown – 6 receptions, 124 yards, TD

=== Week 5: at Dallas Cowboys ===
Week Five: Chicago Bears at Dallas Cowboys – Game summary

Quarter	1	2	3	4	Total
Bears	3	0	0	0	3
Cowboys	0	7	17	3	27

at Texas Stadium, Irving, Texas

- Date: September 28
- Game time: 3:00 p.m. CDT
- Game weather: 78 °F (26 °C)
- Game attendance: 64,082
- TV: Fox
- Box score

Game information

First quarter

- CHI – Jeff Jaeger 21-yard field goal. Bears 3–0.

Second quarter

- DAL – Anthony Miller 6-yard pass from Troy Aikman (Richie Cunningham kick). Cowboys 7–3.

Third quarter

- DAL – Richie Cunningham 33-yard field goal. Cowboys 10–3.
- DAL – Michael Irvin 26-yard pass from Troy Aikman (Richie Cunningham kick). Cowboys 17–3.
- DAL – Deion Sanders 83-yard punt return (Richie Cunningham kick). Cowboys 24–3.

Fourth quarter

- DAL – Richie Cunningham 23-yard field goal. Cowboys 27–3.

Top passers

- CHI – Rick Mirer – 11/21, 62 yards, INT
- DAL – Troy Aikman – 12/27, 144 yards, 2 TD, INT

Top rushers

- CHI – Raymont Harris – 29 rushes, 120 yards
- DAL – Emmitt Smith – 13 rushes, 43 yards

Top receivers

- CHI – Ricky Proehl – 4 receptions, 33 yards
- DAL – Michael Irvin – 6 receptions, 105 yards, TD

=== Week 6: vs. New Orleans Saints ===
Week Six: New Orleans Saints at Chicago Bears – Game summary

Quarter	1	2	3	4	Total
Saints	0	3	10	7	20
Bears	3	0	0	14	17

at Soldier Field, Chicago, Illinois

- Date: October 5
- Game time: 7:15 p.m. CDT
- Game weather: 68 °F (20 °C)
- Game attendance: 58,865
- TV announcers (TNT): Verne Lundquist, Mark May and Bryan Burwell
- Box score

Game information

First quarter

- CHI – Jeff Jaeger 23-yard field goal. Bears 3–0.

Second quarter

- NO – Doug Brien 38-yard field goal. Tied 3–3.

Third quarter

- NO – Mario Bates 49-yard run (Doug Brien kick). Saints 10–3.
- NO – Doug Brien 48-yard field goal. Saints 13–3.

Fourth quarter

- CHI – Erik Kramer 1-yard run (Jeff Jaeger kick). Saints 13–10.
- CHI – Raymont Harris 1-yard run (Jeff Jaeger kick). Bears 17–13.
- NO – Randal Hill 89-yard pass from Heath Shuler (Doug Brien kick). Saints 20–17.

Top passers

- NO – Heath Shuler – 9/23, 195 yards, TD, INT
- CHI – Erik Kramer – 12/20, 131 yards

Top rushers

- NO – Mario Bates – 9 rushes, 58 yards, TD
- CHI – Raymont Harris – 28 rushes, 82 yards, TD

Top receivers

- NO – Randal Hill – 5 receptions, 121 yards, TD
- CHI – Bobby Engram – 6 receptions, 59 yards

=== Week 7: vs. Green Bay Packers ===
Week Seven: Green Bay Packers at Chicago Bears – Game summary

Quarter	1	2	3	4	Total
Packers	0	14	7	3	24
Bears	10	0	7	6	23

at Soldier Field, Chicago, Illinois

- Date: October 12
- Game time: 12:00 p.m. CDT
- Game weather: 68 °F (20 °C)
- Game attendance: 62,212
- TV: Fox
- Box score

Game information

First quarter

- CHI – Raymont Harris 1-yard run (Jeff Jaeger kick). Bears 7–0.
- CHI – Jeff Jaeger 41-yard field goal. Bears 10–0.

Second quarter

- GB – Mark Chmura 2-yard pass from Brett Favre (Ryan Longwell kick). Bears 10–7.
- GB – Dorsey Levens 1-yard pass from Brett Favre (Ryan Longwell kick). Packers 14–10.

Third quarter

- CHI – Erik Kramer 3-yard run (Jeff Jaeger kick). Bears 17–14.
- GB – Mark Chmura 12-yard pass from Brett Favre (Ryan Longwell kick). Packers 21–17.

Fourth quarter

- GB – Ryan Longwell 37-yard field goal. Packers 24–17.
- CHI – Chris Penn 22-yard pass from Erik Kramer (pass failed). Packers 24–23.

Top passers

- GB – Brett Favre – 19/35, 177 yards, 3 TD, INT
- CHI – Erik Kramer – 22/35, 232 yards, TD

Top rushers

- GB – Dorsey Levens – 12 rushes, 74 yards
- CHI – Raymont Harris – 27 rushes, 101 yards, TD

Top receivers

- GB – Antonio Freeman – 7 receptions, 86 yards
- CHI – Curtis Conway – 5 receptions, 77 yards

=== Week 9: at Miami Dolphins ===
Week Nine: Chicago Bears at Miami Dolphins – Game summary

Quarter	1	2	3	4	OT	Total
Bears	7	8	3	15	3	36
Dolphins	7	6	6	14	0	33

at Pro Player Stadium, Miami Gardens, Florida

- Date: October 27
- Game time: 8:00 p.m. CST/9:00 p.m. EST
- Game weather: 82 °F (28 °C)
- Game attendance: 73,156
- TV announcers (ABC): Al Michaels, Dan Dierdorf and Lynn Swann
- Box score

Game information

First quarter

- CHI – Raymont Harris 1-yard run (Jeff Jaeger kick). Bears 7–0.
- MIA – Jerris McPhail 71-yard run (Olindo Mare kick). Tied 7–7.

Second quarter

- CHI – Jeff Jaeger 39-yard field goal. Bears 10–7.
- CHI – Dan Marino sacked in end zone. Bears 12–7.
- CHI – Jeff Jaeger 23-yard field goal. Bears 15–7.
- MIA – Jerris McPhail 10-yard pass from Dan Marino (pass failed). Bears 15–13.

Third quarter

- CHI – Jeff Jaeger 47-yard field goal. Bears 18–13.
- MIA – Terrell Buckley 22-yard fumble return (pass failed). Dolphins 19–18.

Fourth quarter

- MIA – Troy Drayton 22-yard pass from Dan Marino (Olindo Mare kick). Dolphins 26–18.
- MIA – Karim Abdul-Jabbar 2-yard run (Olindo Mare kick). Dolphins 33–18.
- CHI – Bobby Engram 8-yard pass from Erik Kramer (Jeff Jaeger kick). Dolphins 33–25.
- CHI – Chris Penn 25-yard pass from Erik Kramer (Erik Kramer pass to Bobby Engram). Tied 33–33.

Overtime

- CHI – Jeff Jaeger 35-yard field goal. Bears 36–33.

Top passers

- CHI – Erik Kramer – 32/50, 343 yards, 2 TD
- MIA – Dan Marino – 18/39, 274 yards, 2 TD, INT

Top rushers

- CHI – Raymont Harris – 25 rushes, 106 yards, TD
- MIA – Jerris McPhail – 2 rushes, 77 yards, TD

Top receivers

- CHI – Curtis Conway – 6 receptions, 100 yards
- MIA – O. J. McDuffie – 7 receptions, 137 yards

=== Week 10: vs. Washington Redskins ===
Week Ten: Washington Redskins at Chicago Bears – Game summary

Quarter	1	2	3	4	Total
Redskins	14	10	7	0	31
Bears	0	0	0	8	8

at Soldier Field, Chicago, Illinois

- Date: November 2
- Game time: 12:00 p.m. CST
- Game weather: 42 °F (6 °C)
- Game attendance: 53,052
- TV: Fox
- Box score

Game information

First quarter

- WAS – James Jenkins 9-yard pass from Gus Frerotte (Scott Blanton kick). Redskins 7–0.
- WAS – Larry Bowie 5-yard run (Scott Blanton kick). Redskins 14–0.

Second quarter

- WAS – Gus Frerotte 1-yard run (Scott Blanton kick). Redskins 21–0.
- WAS – Scott Blanton 38-yard field goal. Redskins 24–0.

Third quarter

- WAS – Leslie Shepherd 39-yard pass from Gus Frerotte (Scott Blanton kick). Redskins 31–0.

Fourth quarter

- CHI – Ricky Proehl 2-yard pass from Erik Kramer (Erik Kramer pass to Ricky Proehl). Redskins 31–8.

Top passers

- WAS – Gus Frerotte – 14/20, 192 yards, 2 TD
- CHI – Erik Kramer – 21/37, 237 yards, TD, INT

Top rushers

- WAS – Terry Allen – 20 rushes, 125 yards
- CHI – Raymont Harris – 13 rushes, 43 yards

Top receivers

- WAS – Leslie Shepherd – 3 receptions, 68 yards, TD
- CHI – Curtis Conway – 3 receptions, 57 yards

=== Week 11: at Minnesota Vikings ===
Week Eleven: Chicago Bears at Minnesota Vikings – Game summary

Quarter	1	2	3	4	Total
Bears	7	3	9	3	22
Vikings	7	14	0	8	29

at Hubert H. Humphrey Metrodome, Minneapolis, Minnesota

- Date: November 9
- Game time: 12:00 p.m. CST
- Game weather: None (played indoors)
- Game attendance: 63,443
- TV: Fox
- Box score

Game information

First quarter

- MIN – David Palmer 8-yard run (Eddie Murray kick). Vikings 7–0.
- CHI – Raymont Harris 1-yard run (Jeff Jaeger kick). Tied 7–7.

Second quarter

- MIN – David Palmer 7-yard pass from Brad Johnson (Eddie Murray kick). Vikings 14–7.
- CHI – Jeff Jaeger 29-yard field goal. Vikings 14–10.
- MIN – Chuck Evans 3-yard run (Eddie Murray kick). Vikings 21–10.

Third quarter

- CHI – Jeff Jaeger 22-yard field goal. Vikings 21–13.
- CHI – Ricky Proehl 59-yard pass from Erik Kramer (pass failed). Vikings 21–19.

Fourth quarter

- CHI – Jeff Jaeger 36-yard field goal. Bears 22–21.
- MIN – Leroy Hoard 1-yard run (Brad Johnson pass to Cris Carter). Vikings 29–22.

Top passers

- CHI – Erik Kramer – 23/35, 256 yards, TD, INT
- MIN – Brad Johnson – 22/33, 203 yards, TD, 2 INT

Top rushers

- CHI – Darnell Autry – 13 rushes, 59 yards
- MIN – Chuck Evans – 8 rushes, 50 yards, TD

Top receivers

- CHI – Ricky Proehl – 9 receptions, 132 yards, TD
- MIN – Cris Carter – 8 receptions, 69 yards

=== Week 12: vs. New York Jets ===
Week Twelve: Chicago Bears at Green Bay Packers – Game summary

Quarter	1	2	3	4	Total
Jets	10	13	0	0	23
Bears	0	0	7	8	15

at Soldier Field, Chicago, Illinois

- Date: November 16
- Game time: 3:00 p.m. CST
- Game weather: 25 °F (−4 °C)
- Game attendance: 45,642
- TV announcers (NBC): Tom Hammond and Randy Cross
- Box score

Game information

First quarter

- NYJ – John Hall 34-yard field goal. Jets 3–0.
- NYJ – Keyshawn Johnson 35-yard pass from Glenn Foley (John Hall kick). Jets 10–0.

Second quarter

- NYJ – John Hall 36-yard field goal. Jets 13–0.
- NYJ – John Hall 34-yard field goal. Jets 16–0.
- NYJ – Otis Smith 38-yard interception return (John Hall kick). Jets 23–0.

Third quarter

- CHI – Chris Penn 4-yard pass from Erik Kramer (Jeff Jaeger kick). Jets 23–7.

Fourth quarter

- CHI – Ricky Proehl 5-yard pass from Erik Kramer (Darnell Autry run). Jets 23–15.

Top passers

- NYJ – Glenn Foley – 8/13, 111 yards, TD
- CHI – Erik Kramer – 32/60, 354 yards, 2 TD, 3 INT

Top rushers

- NYJ – Adrian Murrell – 21 rushes, 60 yards
- CHI – Darnell Autry – 19 rushes, 39 yards

Top receivers

- NYJ – Keyshawn Johnson – 1 reception, 35 yards, TD
- CHI – Ricky Proehl – 11 receptions, 118 yards, TD

=== Week 13: vs. Tampa Bay Buccaneers ===
Week Thirteen: Tampa Bay Buccaneers at Chicago Bears – Game summary

Quarter	1	2	3	4	Total
Buccaneers	0	0	7	0	7
Bears	10	3	0	0	13

at Soldier Field, Chicago, Illinois

- Date: November 23
- Game time: 12:00 p.m. CST
- Game weather: 27 °F (−3 °C)
- Game attendance: 43,955
- TV: Fox
- Box score

Game information

First quarter

- CHI – Raymont Harris 2-yard run (Jeff Jaeger kick). Bears 7–0.
- CHI – Jeff Jaeger 32-yard field goal. Bears 10–0.

Second quarter

- CHI – Jeff Jaeger 25-yard field goal. Bears 13–0.

Third quarter

- TB – Reidel Anthony 12-yard pass from Trent Dilfer (Michael Husted kick). Bears 13–7.

Fourth quarter

- No scoring plays

Top passers

- TB – Trent Dilfer – 19/33, 247 yards, TD
- CHI – Erik Kramer – 15/28, 110 yards

Top rushers

- TB – Mike Alstott – 7 rushes, 18 yards
- CHI – Raymont Harris – 33 rushes, 116 yards, TD

Top receivers

- TB – Reidel Anthony – 4 receptions, 59 yards, TD
- CHI – Chris Penn – 6 receptions, 53 yards

=== Week 14: at Detroit Lions ===
Week Fourteen: Chicago Bears at Detroit Lions – Game summary

Quarter	1	2	3	4	Total
Bears	14	6	0	0	20
Lions	3	14	17	21	55

at Pontiac Silverdome, Detroit, Michigan

- Date: November 27
- Game time: 11:30 a.m. CST/12:30 p.m. EST
- Game weather: None (played indoors)
- Game attendance: 77,904
- TV: Fox
- Box score

Game information

First quarter

- CHI – Raymont Harris 2-yard run (Jeff Jaeger kick). Bears 7–0.
- CHI – Ricky Proehl 78-yard pass from Erik Kramer (Jeff Jaeger kick). Bears 14–0.
- DET – Jason Hanson 40-yard field goal. Bears 14–3.

Second quarter

- CHI – Jeff Jaeger 52-yard field goal. Bears 17–3.
- DET – Herman Moore 8-yard pass from Scott Mitchell (Jason Hanson kick). Bears 17–10.
- CHI – Jeff Jaeger 32-yard field goal. Bears 20–10.
- DET – Barry Sanders 40-yard run (Jason Hanson kick). Bears 20–17.

Third quarter

- DET – Jason Hanson 29-yard field goal. Tied 20–20.
- DET – Johnnie Morton 50-yard pass from Scott Mitchell (Jason Hanson kick). Lions 27–20.
- DET – Barry Sanders 25-yard run (Jason Hanson kick). Lions 34–20.

Fourth quarter

- DET – Barry Sanders 15-yard run (Jason Hanson kick). Lions 41–20.
- DET – Ron Rivers 13-yard run (Jason Hanson kick). Lions 48–20.
- DET – Tracy Scroggins 17-yard fumble return (Jason Hanson kick). Lions 55–20.

Top passers

- CHI – Erik Kramer – 13/26, 259 yards, TD
- DET – Scott Mitchell – 20/31, 282 yards, 2 TD, INT

Top rushers

- CHI – Raymont Harris – 19 rushes, 49 yards, TD
- DET – Barry Sanders – 19 rushes, 167 yards, 3 TD

Top receivers

- CHI – Ricky Proehl – 4 receptions, 164 yards, TD
- DET – Johnnie Morton – 7 receptions, 120 yards, TD

=== Week 15: vs. Buffalo Bills ===
Week Fifteen: Buffalo Bills at Chicago Bears – Game summary

Quarter	1	2	3	4	Total
Bills	0	3	0	0	3
Bears	0	17	0	3	20

at Soldier Field, Chicago, Illinois

- Date: December 7
- Game time: 12:00 p.m. CST
- Game weather: 31 °F (−1 °C)
- Game attendance: 39,784
- TV announcers (NBC): Don Criqui and Jim Mora
- Box score

Game information

First quarter

- No scoring plays

Second quarter

- CHI – Jeff Jaeger 41-yard field goal. Bears 3–0.
- CHI – Ryan Wetnight 30-yard pass from Erik Kramer (Jeff Jaeger kick). Bears 10–0.
- CHI – Ricky Proehl 3-yard pass from Erik Kramer (Jeff Jaeger kick). Bears 17–0.
- BUF – Steve Christie 43-yard field goal. Bears 17–3.

Third quarter

- No scoring plays

Fourth quarter

- CHI – Jeff Jaeger 38-yard field goal. Bears 20–3.

Top passers

- BUF – Todd Collins – 13/32, 138 yards
- CHI – Erik Kramer – 23/33, 270 yards, 2 TD, 2 INT

Top rushers

- BUF – Thurman Thomas – 7 rushes, 22 yards
- CHI – Raymont Harris – 24 rushes, 59 yards

Top receivers

- BUF – Darick Holmes – 3 receptions, 41 yards
- CHI – Curtis Conway – 7 receptions, 115 yards

=== Week 16: at St. Louis Rams ===
Week Sixteen: Chicago Bears at St. Louis Rams – Game summary

Quarter	1	2	3	4	Total
Bears	0	7	0	6	13
Rams	7	0	0	3	10

at Trans World Dome, St. Louis, Missouri

- Date: December 14
- Game time: 7:15 p.m. CST
- Game weather: None (played indoors)
- Game attendance: 66,030
- TV announcers (ESPN): Mike Patrick, Roy Firestone and Ron Jaworski
- Box score

Game information

First quarter

- STL – Jerald Moore 1-yard run (Jeff Wilkins kick). Rams 7–0.

Second quarter

- CHI – Curtis Conway 55-yard pass from Erik Kramer (Jeff Jaeger kick). Tied 7–7.

Third quarter

- No scoring plays

Fourth quarter

- STL – Jeff Wilkins 26-yard field goal. Rams 10–7.
- CHI – Jeff Jaeger 27-yard field goal. Tied 10–10.
- CHI – Jeff Jaeger 21-yard field goal. Bears 13–10.

Top passers

- CHI – Erik Kramer – 14/22, 186 yards, TD, INT
- STL – Tony Banks – 13/28, 147 yards, 3 INT

Top rushers

- CHI – Darnell Autry – 26 rushes, 62 yards
- STL – Jerald Moore – 13 rushes, 35 yards, TD

Top receivers

- CHI – Curtis Conway – 7 receptions, 109 yards, TD
- STL – Isaac Bruce – 3 receptions, 46 yards

=== Week 17: at Tampa Bay Buccaneers ===
Week Seventeen: Chicago Bears at Tampa Bay Buccaneers – Game summary

Quarter	1	2	3	4	Total
Bears	0	7	0	8	15
Buccaneers	14	7	10	0	31

at Houlihan's Stadium, Tampa Bay, Florida

- Date: December 21
- Game time: 12:00 p.m. CST/1:00 p.m. EST
- Game weather: 65 °F (18 °C)
- Game attendance: 70,930
- TV: Fox
- Box score

Game information

First quarter

- TB – Trent Dilfer 7-yard run (Michael Husted kick). Buccaneers 7–0.
- TB – Karl Williams 61-yard punt return (Michael Husted kick). Buccaneers 14–0.

Second quarter

- CHI – Darnell Autry 3-yard run (Jeff Jaeger kick). Buccaneers 14–7.
- TB – Karl Williams 7-yard pass from Trent Dilfer (Michael Husted kick). Buccaneers 21–7.

Third quarter

- TB – Michael Husted 20-yard field goal. Buccaneers 24–7.
- TB – Errict Rhett 5-yard run (Michael Husted kick). Buccaneers 31–7.

Fourth quarter

- CHI – Rick Mirer 1-yard run (Rick Mirer run). Buccaneers 31–15.

Top passers

- CHI – Erik Kramer – 12/19, 89 yards, INT
- TB – Trent Dilfer – 10/18, 94 yards, TD

Top rushers

- CHI – Darnell Autry – 16 rushes, 45 yards, TD
- TB – Warrick Dunn – 16 rushes, 119 yards

Top receivers

- CHI – Ricky Proehl – 4 receptions, 41 yards
- TB – Karl Williams – 4 receptions, 47 yards, TD
