= Markus Paul =

American football player and coach (1966–2020)

No. 36
- Position: Safety

Personal information
- Born: April 1, 1966; Orlando, Florida, U.S.
- Died: November 25, 2020 (aged 54); Plano, Texas, U.S.
- Listed height: 6 ft 2 in (1.88 m)
- Listed weight: 200 lb (91 kg)

Career information
- High school: Osceola (Kissimmee, Florida)
- College: Syracuse
- NFL draft: 1989: 4th round, 95th overall pick

Career history

Playing
- Chicago Bears (1989–1992); Dallas Cowboys (1993)*; Chicago Bears (1993); Tampa Bay Buccaneers (1993)
- * Offseason or practice squad member only

Coaching
- New Orleans Saints (1998–1999) Assistant strength and conditioning coach; New England Patriots (2000–2004) Assistant strength and conditioning coach; New York Jets (2005) Director of physical development; New York Jets (2006) Strength and conditioning coach; New York Giants (2007–2018) Assistant strength and conditioning coach; Dallas Cowboys (2018–2020) Head strength and conditioning coach

Awards and highlights
- As player: First-team All-American (1988); 2× First-team All-East (1987, 1988); Second-team All-East (1985); As coach: 5× Super Bowl champion (XXXVI, XXXVIII, XXXIX, XLII, XLVI)

Career NFL statistics
- Interceptions: 7
- Stats at Pro Football Reference

Markus Dwayne Paul (April 1, 1966 – November 25, 2020) was an American professional football player who was a safety in the National Football League (NFL) for the Chicago Bears and Tampa Bay Buccaneers. He played college football for the Syracuse Orange and was selected by the Chicago Bears in the 1989 NFL draft. He also was a strength and conditioning coach with the New Orleans Saints, New England Patriots, New York Jets, New York Giants and Dallas Cowboys.

== Early life ==
Paul attended Osceola High School in Kissimmee, Florida. As a junior, he was named the starting quarterback and contributed to the team reaching the state championship game, where they lost to Titusville High School.

He also was a starter in the school's basketball team that had a perfect 37-0 record and won the state championship during the 1982-83 season.

== College career ==
Paul accepted a football scholarship from Syracuse University, where he played under head coach Dick MacPherson from 1984 to 1988. Paul chose Syracuse because it was the only football program that gave him the option to play as either a quarterback or a defensive back; other Division I programs only recruited him to play on defense.

As a true freshman, he decided on playing as a safety early on, was named a starter for the season opener and recorded 7 interceptions during the season, including 3 in one game. He would go on to start every game for Syracuse as a free safety during his career.

As a junior, he was a finalist for the Jim Thorpe Award and tallied 5 interceptions. As a senior, he was again a finalist for the Jim Thorpe Award, registered 4 interceptions and earned first-team All-American honors.

Paul set the school records for interceptions in a career (19) and in a game (3). In October 1999, he was named to the Syracuse University's All-Century team.

== Professional career ==
=== Chicago Bears (first stint) ===
The Chicago Bears traded with the Los Angeles Raiders to move up and select Paul in the fourth round (95th overall) of the 1989 NFL draft. During his rookie season, Paul primarily deputized for Shaun Gayle. Paul's first career interception in the NFL came in a week eight game against the Los Angeles Rams.

During the 1990 season, Paul primarily served as a backup with at least five other defensive backs ahead of him in the depth chart. Paul replaced Mark Carrier in a week five match-up against the Green Bay Packers after Carrier suffered a concussion.

On August 17, 1993, after Cowboys defensive coordinator Dave Wannstedt became the head coach for the Chicago Bears, he traded Paul, linebacker John Roper and tight end Kelly Blackwell, in exchange for linebacker Vinson Smith, linebacker Barry Minter and a sixth-round draft pick (#198-Carl Reeves).

=== Dallas Cowboys ===
On August 30, 1993, he was released by the Dallas Cowboys.

=== Chicago Bears (second stint) ===
On August 31, 1993, he was signed as a free agent by the Chicago Bears. He appeared in 8 games, playing as a nickel back on passing downs. He was cut on December 15. He started in 15 of the 70 career games he played with the Bears and registered 7 interceptions.

=== Tampa Bay Buccaneers ===
On December 22, 1993, he signed as a free agent with the Tampa Bay Buccaneers. He appeared in one game and was declared inactive for the season finale. He was released on August 8, 1994.

=== NFL statistics ===
Year	Team	Games		Interceptions				
Year	Team	GP	GS	Int	Yds	Avg	Lng	TD
1989	CHI	16	3	1	20	20	20	0
1990	CHI	16	0	2	49	24.5	26	0
1991	CHI	14	7	3	21	7	10	0
1992	CHI	16	5	1	10	10	10	0
1993	CHI	8	0	0	0	0	0	0
1993	TB	1	0	0	0	0	0	0
Career		71	15	7	100	14.3	26	0

== Coaching career ==
In 1998, Paul rejoined his strength and conditioning coach at Syracuse, Mike Woicik, then serving in the same position with the New Orleans Saints, as the Saints' assistant strength and conditioning coach. Paul followed Woicik to the Patriots in 2000, again serving as the assistant strength and conditioning coach under Bill Belichick. After winning Super Bowl XXXVI, Super Bowl XXXVIII, and Super Bowl XXXIX with the Patriots, he left the team for the New York Jets following the 2004 season.

He spent one year under Herman Edwards as the Jets' director of physical development, then a year under Eric Mangini as the team's strength and conditioning coach. At the end of the 2006 season, Mangini chose not to renew Paul's contract.

Paul was then hired by the New York Giants as their assistant strength and conditioning coach and won two more Super Bowls (XLII and XLVI) in his 12 year tenure. Paul was the assistant strength coach for the Dallas Cowboys in 2018, once again joining Woicik on an NFL coaching staff. In 2020, he was named the team's head strength and conditioning coordinator. Across his coaching career, Paul was involved in five Super Bowl wins.

== Personal life ==
On November 24, 2020, Paul was rushed to the hospital after suffering a heart attack at the Cowboys' team facility, and died the following day at age 54.
