= Keshon Johnson =

American football player (born 1970)

No. 25, 33, 37
- Position: Cornerback

Personal information
- Born: July 17, 1970 (age 56); Fresno, California, U.S.
- Listed height: 5 ft 10 in (1.78 m)
- Listed weight: 185 lb (84 kg)

Career information
- High school: Edison (Fresno)
- College: Arizona
- NFL draft: 1993: 7th round, 173rd overall pick

Career history
- Chicago Bears (1993-1994); Green Bay Packers (1994); Detroit Lions (1995); Chicago Bears (1995)

Awards and highlights
- First-team All-Pac-10 (1992); Senior Bowl (1993)

Career NFL statistics
- Total tackles: 8
- Interceptions: 1
- FF / FR: 0 / 1
- Stats at Pro Football Reference

Keshon Lorenzo Johnson (July 17, 1970) is an American former professional football player who was a cornerback in the National Football League (NFL). He played college football for the Arizona Wildcats. He was selected by the Chicago Bears in the seventh round of the 1993 NFL draft.

== Early life ==
Johnson attended Edison High School before enrolling at Fresno City College. He then transferred to the University of Arizona. While at Arizona, he was an All-Pac-10 selection in 1992. That same season, he was named a member of the Bill Belichick coached NFC roster for the 1993 Senior Bowl.

== Professional career ==
Pre-draft measurables
Height	Weight	Arm length	Hand span	40-yard dash	10-yard split	20-yard split	20-yard shuttle	Vertical jump	Broad jump	Bench press
5 ft 9 7/8 in (1.77 m)	177 lb (80 kg)	30 3/8 in (0.77 m)	8 1/2 in (0.22 m)	4.51 s	1.58 s	2.59 s	3.93 s	38.0 in (0.97 m)	10 ft 1 in (3.07 m)	8 reps
All values from NFL Combine

Johnson was selected by the Chicago Bears in the seventh round (173rd overall) of the 1993 NFL draft. During his rookie season, he appeared in 15 games. He recorded five tackles. In 1994, he appeared in six games and recorded two tackles. He was waived on October 29, 1994. On November 2, he was claimed off waivers by the Green Bay Packers. With the Packers, he appeared in seven games, recording one interception. He was waived by the Packers on April 28, 1995. He began the 1995 NFL season with the Detroit Lions, but did not appear in any games. He re-joined the Bears and appeared in 12 games and recorded one tackle. After the season, he became a restricted free agent.
