= Bobby Neely =

American football player (born 1974)

No. 87
- Position: Tight end

Personal information
- Born: March 22, 1974 (age 52); Atlanta, Georgia
- Listed height: 6 ft 3 in (1.91 m)
- Listed weight: 255 lb (116 kg)

Career information
- High school: Benjamin Elijah Mays High School
- College: Virginia

Career history
- Chicago Bears (1996)*; Miami Dolphins (1996)*; Chicago Bears (1996)
- * Offseason or practice squad member only

Career statistics
- Games played: 11
- Games started: 5
- Receptions: 9
- Receiving yards: 92
- Stats at Pro Football Reference

Robert Lee Neely (born March 22, 1974) is an American actor and former American football tight end who played for the Chicago Bears in the National Football League (NFL). He played college football at Virginia University.

== Early life and education ==
Neely played all four of his college years at Virginia University. He played his first year at Virginia, being one of only four true freshman that season. After his first season at the University of Virginia, he was regarded as one of the best freshman Tight-Ends in the country. After suffering, a high ankle sprain during a career high statistical game against the University of Michigan in 1995, Bobby played in only five games his senior season. He was very frustrated that he had missed the chance to be an All-ACC tight end. He believed that he deserved the award because he did just as well as the winner. He also claimed that he was the best tight end out there and one of the only 'real' ones. Meaning, having the ability to both block and catch passes was key. While there, he caught 50 passes for 509 yards. Unfortunately out of those 50 catches, none resulted in a touchdown. Some believe these factors led to him being undrafted.

== Professional career ==
After college, he was signed to the Chicago Bears as an undrafted free agent. He did not make the final roster. Therefore, he decided to sign with the Miami Dolphins practice squad. About five games into the season, however, the Bears had lost all of their active tight ends due to injuries. They re-signed Neely to their active roster where he was now the starting tight end. During his rookie season, he played in eleven games, starting in five. He caught 9-of-13 passes for 92 yards in the games he played. He suffered a career-ending injury before his second season.

== Post career ==
Neely took his talents to Los Angeles to pursue a career in entertainment. He has appeared on shows NCIS, Grey's Anatomy, and most recently Rebel, and Seal Team. He currently still lives in Los Angeles and is a Luxury Real Estate agent with Amalfi Estates in Pacific Palisades.
