= Robert Bass (American football) =

American football player (born 1970)

No. 52
- Position: Linebacker

Personal information
- Born: November 10, 1970 (age 55); Brooklyn, New York, U.S.
- Listed height: 6 ft 0 in (1.83 m)
- Listed weight: 239 lb (108 kg)

Career information
- High school: Samuel J. Tilden (Brooklyn)
- College: Miami (FL)
- NFL draft: 1994: undrafted

Career history
- Chicago Bears (1994–1995); Green Bay Packers (1995); Scottish Claymores (1997)

Awards and highlights
- National champion (1991)
- Stats at Pro Football Reference

Robert Shawn Bass (born November 10, 1970) is an American former professional football player who was a linebacker for one season with the Chicago Bears of the National Football League (NFL). He played college football for the Miami Hurricanes. He was also a member of the Green Bay Packers of the NFL and the Scottish Claymores of the World League of American Football (WLAF).

== Early life and college ==
Bass played both offense and defense at Samuel J. Tilden High School in Brooklyn, New York and was named SuperPrep's running back of the year in the Northeast his senior year.

He attended Nassau Community College in Uniondale, New York before transferring to the University of Miami, where he started his first game during his senior year.

== Professional career ==
Bass signed with the Chicago Bears on April 28, 1994, after going undrafted in the 1994 NFL draft. he was placed on injured reserve on August 23, 1994. He was released by the Bears on August 22, 1995, but re-signed on September 12. He played in two games for the Bears during the 1995 NFL season. He was released on September 27, 1995.

Bass was signed to the Green Bay Packers practice squad on October 30, 1995. He was promoted to the active roster on January 4, 1996. He was released by the Packers on August 4, 1996.

Bass played for the Scottish Claymores of the World League of American Football in 1997.

== Personal life ==
Bass worked as Director of Player Development for the Miami Dolphins from 2000 to 2003. In 2012, he founded a security services company called Never Left Alone Security Consulting.

He ran for Montgomery County, Maryland sheriff as a Democratic candidate in 2021. He had moved to the county to work as a sheriff's deputy in 2008. As of 2021, he was living in Silver Spring, Maryland.
