= Pat Riley (American football) =

American football player (born 1972)

No. 78
- Position: Defensive end

Personal information
- Born: March 8, 1972 (age 54); Marrero, Louisiana, U.S.
- Listed height: 6 ft 5 in (1.96 m)
- Listed weight: 286 lb (130 kg)

Career information
- High school: Archbishop Shaw
- College: Miami (FL)
- NFL draft: 1995: 2nd round, 52nd overall pick

Career history
- Chicago Bears (1995); Atlanta Falcons (1996)*; Seattle Seahawks (1996)
- * Offseason or practice squad member only

Awards and highlights
- National champion (1991)
- Stats at Pro Football Reference

Patrick Joseph Riley (born March 8, 1972) is an American former professional football player who was a defensive end for one game with the Chicago Bears of the National Football League (NFL) in 1995. He played college football for the Miami Hurricanes.
