= Garland Hawkins =

American football player (born 1970)

No. 74
- Position: Defensive end

Personal information
- Born: February 19, 1970 (age 56); Washington, D.C., U.S.
- Listed height: 6 ft 3 in (1.91 m)
- Listed weight: 253 lb (115 kg)

Career information
- High school: DeMatha Catholic (Hyattsville, Maryland)
- College: Syracuse (1988–1992)
- NFL draft: 1993: undrafted

Career history
- Chicago Bears (1993–1995)
- Stats at Pro Football Reference

Garland Anthony Hawkins (born February 19, 1970) is an American former professional football player who was a defensive end for one season with the Chicago Bears of the National Football League (NFL). He played college football for the Syracuse Orange.

== Early life ==
Garland Anthony Hawkins was born on February 19, 1970, in Washington, D.C. He attended DeMatha Catholic High School in Hyattsville, Maryland, where he was a Parade All-American and a Blue Chip Magazine Top 100 selection.

== College career ==
Hawkins was a four-year letterman for the Syracuse Orange from 1989 to 1992 as a linebacker. He redshirted in 1988. He played in all 12 games in 1989 and was a significant contributor on special teams, recording 14 solo tackles, seven assisted tackles, and three sacks. He started all 13 games at linebacker in 1990, totaling 24 solo tackles, 19 assisted tackles, and 4.5 sacks. Hawkins started all 12 games in 1991, accumulating 17 solo tackles, 12 assisted tackles, 4.5 sacks, and one interception. He started all 12 games again his senior year in 1992, recording 13 solo tackles, 16 assisted tackles, 4.5 sacks, and one interception. He majored in sociology at Syracuse.

=== College statistics ===
| Season | Team | GP | Cmb | Solo | Ast | Sck | Int |
|---|---|---|---|---|---|---|---|
| 1989 | Syracuse | 12 | 21 | 14 | 7 | 3 | 0 |
| 1990 | Syracuse | 13 | 43 | 24 | 19 | 4.5 | 0 |
| 1991 | Syracuse | 12 | 29 | 17 | 12 | 4.5 | 1 |
| 1992 | Syracuse | 12 | 29 | 13 | 16 | 4.5 | 1 |
| Career | | 49 | 122 | 68 | 54 | 16.5 | 2 |

== Professional career ==
After going undrafted in the 1993 NFL draft, Hawkins signed with the Chicago Bears on April 29, 1993. He was released on August 24, 1993. He re-signed with the Bears the next year on April 29, 1994. Hawkins was placed on injured reserve on August 8, 1994, and spent the entire 1994 season there. He played in one game for the Bears during the 1995 season, recording one solo tackle, before being waived on September 22, 1995. He was listed as a defensive end with the Bears.
