= Vinson Smith =

American football player (born 1965)

No. 52, 55, 57
- Position: Linebacker

Personal information
- Born: July 3, 1965 (age 61); Statesville, North Carolina, U.S.
- Listed height: 6 ft 2 in (1.88 m)
- Listed weight: 247 lb (112 kg)

Career information
- High school: Statesville (NC)
- College: East Carolina (1984–1987)
- NFL draft: 1988: undrafted

Career history
- Atlanta Falcons (1988); Pittsburgh Steelers (1989); Dallas Cowboys (1990–1992); Chicago Bears (1993–1996); Dallas Cowboys (1997); New Orleans Saints (1998–1999)

Awards and highlights
- Super Bowl champion (XXVII)

Career NFL statistics
- Tackles: 423
- Fumble recoveries: 7
- Sacks: 8
- Stats at Pro Football Reference

Robert Vinson Smith (born July 3, 1965) is an American former professional football player who was a linebacker in the National Football League (NFL). He played college football for the East Carolina Pirates. Smith played in the NFL for the Atlanta Falcons, Pittsburgh Steelers, Dallas Cowboys, Chicago Bears and New Orleans Saints. He won Super Bowl XXVII with Dallas over the Buffalo Bills.

== Early life ==
Smith attended Statesville High School. As a senior, he received All-state honors at defensive tackle in football and also in baseball.

He accepted a football scholarship from East Carolina University. As a sophomore, he was a backup defensive lineman and posted 2 interceptions. As a junior, he was converted into an inside linebacker and became a starter, leading the team with 116 tackles.

As a senior, he collected 118 tackles, leading the team in tackles again, and had 2 interceptions. Smith finished his college career with 294 tackles, 4 interceptions and 2 fumble recoveries.

In 2003, he was inducted into the East Carolina University Athletics Hall of Fame.

== Professional career ==
=== Atlanta Falcons ===
Smith was signed as an undrafted free agent by the Atlanta Falcons after the 1988 NFL draft on May 2, with the intention on playing linebacker. On August 29, he was placed on the injured reserve list with an elbow injury. He was activated on November 5, but only played in 3 games. On December 10, he was placed on the injured reserve list for the last 2 weeks of the season.

=== Pittsburgh Steelers ===
On February 28, 1989, he signed with the Pittsburgh Steelers as a Plan B free agent. He broke his right foot in the second preseason game against the Cleveland Browns and was placed on the injured reserve list on August 29.

=== Dallas Cowboys (first stint) ===
Although he didn't have many regular season games, Jimmy Johnson and Dave Wannstedt remembered his playing days at East Carolina University, and signed him as a Plan B free agent on March 3, 1990. He played mainly on special teams. He replaced an injured Ken Norton Jr. at weakside linebacker in the 15th game against the Philadelphia Eagles. That performance earned him his first career start and game MVP honors, in the team's next game against the Atlanta Falcons, when he had 11 tackles and recovered one fumble. He finished the season with 22 special teams tackles (second on the team), 23 defensive tackles, 2 fumble recovered and one forced fumble.

In 1991, he started 12 games at weakside linebacker, although he contracted hepatitis, which forced the team to place him on injured reserve for 3 games (week 10 through week 12), and have Dixon Edwards replace him in the starting lineup. He registered 71 tackles (sixth on the team), one tackle for loss, 3 quarterback pressures, one pass defensed and one forced fumble.

In 1992, he started 13 games at strongside linebacker, posting 69 tackles (fifth on the team), 3 tackles for loss, 13 special teams tackles (fourth on the team), one sack and one and one quarterback pressure. The Cowboys won Super Bowl XXVII with him as a starter and contributing to the goal-line stand, which stopped the Buffalo Bills inside the Cowboys 1-yard line.

On August 17, 1993, after defensive coordinator Dave Wannstedt became the head coach for the Chicago Bears, he traded for Smith, linebacker Barry Minter and a sixth-round draft pick, in exchange for linebacker John Roper, tight end Kelly Blackwell and safety Markus Paul.

=== Chicago Bears ===
In 1993, he started 13 games at strongside linebacker and had 83 tackles, including 49 solo.

In 1994, he played in 12 games (10 starts), he entered the season as the starter at strongside linebacker, but was limited with knee and ankle injuries that affected his production, finishing with 48 tackles, one sack and one forced fumble. He suffered a knee injury in the season opener against the Tampa Bay Buccaneers and missed the next 2 games. He sprained his ankle in the fifth game against the Buffalo Bills and missed the next 2 games. He was replaced in the starting lineup with Ron Cox.

In March 1995, the Bears signed him to a new two-year contract. He posted 111 tackles (fifth on the team), 4 sacks (tied for third on the team), one forced fumble and one fumble recovery. He had 14 tackles (12 solo) against the Jacksonville Jaguars. He had 10 tackles and one fumble recovery against the Pittsburgh Steelers. He was awarded the Ed Block courage award at the end of the season.

In 1996, he tallied 89 tackles (sixth on the team), 2 fumble recoveries, one sack and one pass defensed. He had 14 tackles against the Kansas City Chiefs. He had 10 tackles and one fumble recovery against the Tampa Bay Buccaneers. He missed the game against the San Diego Chargers with an ankle injury.

=== Dallas Cowboys (second stint) ===
On July 18, 1997, he signed as a free agent with the Dallas Cowboys. His preseason performance allowed the team to release Alan Campos, keeping only 5 linebackers, with Smith backing up all three linebacker positions, in order to make room for cornerback Deion Sanders under the salary cap. He appeared in 14 games with 3 starts, missing 2 games with a broken jaw. He posted 22 tackles (8 solo), one sack, 14 special teams tackles (fifth on the team). He had 5 special teams tackles against the Carolina Panthers. He wasn't re-signed after the season.

=== New Orleans Saints ===
On September 9, 1998, he signed as a free agent with the New Orleans Saints. He appeared in 15 games as a backup, making 4 defensive tackles, 4 special teams tackles and one forced fumble.

In 1999, he appeared in 12 games, recording 8 special teams tackles (fourth on the team), one forced fumble and no defensive tackles. On December 16, 1999, he was placed on the injured reserve list. He wasn't re-signed after the season.

== Personal life ==
Smith is the owner of JPC Bail Bonds. He was the football head coach of Piedmont Christian High School and has held many football training camps for the youth of Iredell County, North Carolina. He is married to Maria Robinson-Smith they have 5 children and 6 grandchildren.
