= Evan Pilgrim =

American football player (born 1972)

No. 61, 63, 65
- Position: Guard

Personal information
- Born: August 14, 1972 (age 54); Pittsburg, California, U.S.
- Listed height: 6 ft 4 in (1.93 m)
- Listed weight: 304 lb (138 kg)

Career information
- High school: Antioch (Antioch, California)
- College: BYU
- NFL draft: 1995: 3rd round, 87th overall pick

Career history
- Chicago Bears (1995–1997); Tennessee Oilers (1998); Denver Broncos (1999); Atlanta Falcons (1999–2000); Detroit Fury (2002); Tampa Bay Storm (2004)

Career NFL statistics
- Games played: 96
- Games started: 24
- Stats at Pro Football Reference

Evan Boyd Pilgrim (born August 14, 1972) is an American former professional football player who was an offensive guard in the National Football League (NFL). He played professionally for the Chicago Bears, Tennessee Oilers, Denver Broncos, and Atlanta Falcons.

== Early life ==
Pilgrim was born in Pittsburg, California, son of Emma (Donakey) and Ralph Pilgrim. He attended Antioch High School, in Antioch, was named to the Contra Costa County all-star team. He was team captain and lettered in football, basketball and track.

== College career ==
Attending Brigham Young University (BYU) in Utah on a full scholarship, Pilgrim was an All-Conference lineman with the nickname “Pancake Maker” for his blocking prowess. He was team captain during his senior year, and made the Kodak All-America Team. He held the bench press record of 510 pounds at BYU. Inducted into BYU's Hall of Fame in 2005, he was also named to its All-Time LaVell Edwards BYU Team.

== NFL career ==
Pilgrim was selected into the NFL by the Chicago Bears in the third round (87th pick overall) of the 1995 NFL draft. He played for the Bears from 1995-1997. Pilgrim played for the Tennessee Oilers for part of 1998, and for the Denver Broncos for a short time in 1999. Traded to the Atlanta Falcons, he finished his six-season career, playing in 32 games (10 with the Falcons). He played for the Falcons in 1999 in Super Bowl XXXIII.

== Life after the NFL ==
Pilgrim retired from the NFL in 2001. He suited up as a player again to appear as a “prison guard” defensive lineman in the 2005 film “The Longest Yard,” starring Adam Sandler. He was the onfield coordinator for the film.

Pilgrim married Andrea Terry in July 1992. He later married Christi Bollenbacher in July 2009.
