= Michael Lowery =

American football player (born 1974)

No. 53
- Position: Linebacker

Personal information
- Born: February 14, 1974 (age 52); McComb, Mississippi, U.S.
- Listed height: 6 ft 0 in (1.83 m)
- Listed weight: 232 lb (105 kg)

Career information
- High school: Magnolia (MS) South Pike
- College: Ole Miss
- NFL draft: 1996: undrafted

Career history
- Chicago Bears (1996–1997); Rhein Fire (1999)
- Stats at Pro Football Reference

Michael Lowery (born February 14, 1974) is an American former professional football player who was a linebacker for the Chicago Bears of the National Football League (NFL) from 1996 to 1997. He played college football for the Ole Miss Rebels.

Lowery was born in McComb, Mississippi. Standing at 6'0" tall and weighing 232 lbs, Lowery attended Hillsborough Community College before transferring to the University of Mississippi. Over his NFL career, he appeared in 32 games, recording 4 solo tackles, with no sacks, forced fumbles, or interceptions.
