= Dave Wannstedt =

American football player, coach, executive (born 1952)

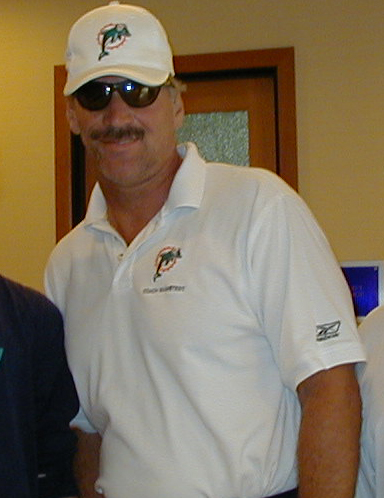
- Wannstedt with the Miami Dolphins in 2003

Profile
- Position: Offensive tackle

Personal information
- Born: May 21, 1952 (age 74); Baldwin, Pennsylvania, U.S.

Career information
- High school: Baldwin (PA)
- College: Pittsburgh (1970–1973)
- NFL draft: 1974: 15th round, 376th overall pick

Career history

Playing
- Green Bay Packers (1974)*
- * Offseason or practice squad member only

Coaching
- Pittsburgh (1975–1978) Graduate assistant; Oklahoma State (1979–1982) Defensive line coach; USC (1983–1985) Defensive line coach; Miami (FL) (1986–1988) Defensive coordinator; Dallas Cowboys (1989–1992) Defensive coordinator; Chicago Bears (1993–1998) Head coach; Miami Dolphins (1999) Associate head coach; Miami Dolphins (2000–2004) Head coach; Pittsburgh (2005–2010) Head coach; Buffalo Bills (2011–2012) Associate head coach & linebackers coach; Buffalo Bills (2012) Defensive coordinator; Tampa Bay Buccaneers (2013) Special teams coach

Awards and highlights
- Super Bowl champion (XXVII); National champion (1987)

Head coaching record
- Regular season: NFL: 82–87 (.485); NCAA: 42–31 (.575)
- Postseason: NFL: 2–3 (.400); NCAA: 1–1 (.500)
- Career: NFL: 84–90 (.483); NCAA: 43–32 (.573)
- Coaching profile at Pro Football Reference

David Raymond Wannstedt (born May 21, 1952) is an American former college and professional football coach. He has been the head coach of the Chicago Bears (1993–1998) and Miami Dolphins (2000–2004) of the National Football League (NFL). He was also the head coach of the University of Pittsburgh football team from 2005 to 2010. He also was a long-time assistant to Jimmy Johnson with the Dallas Cowboys, Miami Hurricanes, and Oklahoma State Cowboys as well as an associate of Johnson when both were assistants at the University of Pittsburgh.

== Early life ==
Wannstedt was born in Baldwin, Pennsylvania and attended Baldwin High School. He earned an athletic scholarship to the University of Pittsburgh playing offensive tackle and blocking for future Heisman Trophy winner Tony Dorsett. After a successful career with the Panthers, he was chosen in the fifteenth round of the 1974 NFL draft by the Green Bay Packers. He spent his only NFL season on the injured reserve list with a neck injury.

== Coaching career ==
=== Assistant coach in college ===
In 1975, Pitt coach Johnny Majors hired him as a graduate assistant coach. The following year, while at Pitt, he earned his master's degree. He was on the staff when the Panthers won the 1976 NCAA Division I-A national football championship with a victory over the Georgia Bulldogs in the 1977 Sugar Bowl. In 1977, Jimmy Johnson joined the staff of the Pitt Panthers and the two would forge a long lasting personal and professional bond. When Johnson left to become the head coach of the Oklahoma State Cowboys in 1979, he invited Wannstedt to join his staff.

Wannstedt served as defensive line coach for the Oklahoma State Cowboys for the 1979 and 1980 seasons and was promoted to defensive coordinator in 1981, a spot he held for two seasons. He moved on to the University of Southern California in 1983 to coach the Trojans and served as the defensive line coach for three years. In 1986, Wannstedt became defensive coordinator for the Miami Hurricanes under friend and mentor Jimmy Johnson, where they won a national championship in 1987.

=== Dallas Cowboys ===
When Johnson was hired as head coach of the Dallas Cowboys in 1989, Wannstedt joined Dallas' staff as defensive coordinator. The Cowboys defense was considered one of the best in the NFL under Wannstedt's leadership and he became a prime candidate to become an NFL head coach. When Chuck Noll retired as head coach of the Pittsburgh Steelers, in 1992, Wannstedt was one of the finalists for the job, but was ultimately edged out by fellow Pittsburgh-area native Bill Cowher.

=== Chicago Bears ===
On January 19, 1993, he was hired as the head coach of the Chicago Bears replacing legendary coach Mike Ditka, another former Pitt Panther. Wannstedt's tenure at Chicago was tumultuous. He led the Bears to only one postseason appearance in his 6 years at Chicago and compiled a 41–57 record. After Wannstedt posted back-to-back 4–12 seasons and a 1–11 overall record against long-time rival, the Green Bay Packers, Bears owner Michael McCaskey fired Wannstedt on December 28, 1998, a day when five NFL head coaches – one sixth of the league – lost their jobs. Four of those coaches—Wannstedt, Ted Marchibroda, Ray Rhodes, and Dom Capers—were fired within one hour, while Dennis Erickson was fired later that day.

=== Miami Dolphins ===
In 1999, Wannstedt again joined coach Jimmy Johnson's staff—this time, as defensive coordinator and assistant head coach of the Miami Dolphins. When the then-56-year-old Johnson suddenly announced his retirement on January 16, 2000, Wannstedt was immediately named Johnson's successor. Under Wannstedt, the Dolphins' regular season record was 42–31, with playoff appearances in his first two seasons. Wannstedt earned a great deal of praise for guiding the Dolphins through the first few seasons after the retirement of Dan Marino, but his in-game coaching became increasingly unpopular with Dolphins fans, not least in 2002 when the team stopped giving the ball to Ricky Williams and inexplicably gave the New England Patriots several chances to come back and tie the game and then win it in overtime, starting a six-season playoff drought. Fans were further enraged when Wannstedt, whose contract as head coach also gave him the right to overrule then-Dolphins general manager Rick Spielman on draft decisions, nixed Spielman's plan to take Anquan Boldin in the second round and instead chose Tennessee Volunteers linebacker Eddie Moore. Boldin was an immediate star who won the NFL Offensive Rookie of the Year award, was a three-time Pro Bowler, and was a stand-out receiver in his 13-year career. Moore's career was cut short by a serious knee injury and played in only 18 games across two seasons. Along with another late-season collapse in 2003 and no playoff appearance that year, Wannstedt became the face of a rapidly declining franchise who most fans and many players no longer believed in.

Wannstedt resigned as head coach midway through the 2004 season, with the Dolphins' record standing at 1–8. Less than two months later, he agreed to return home to fill the head coach vacancy at his alma mater, the University of Pittsburgh. Wannstedt finished his tenure in Miami with a 42–31 record and to date, is the team's last head coach with prior NFL head coaching experience. Wannstedt has served longer than any other coach in Dolphins history except Don Shula.

=== Pittsburgh ===
When University of Pittsburgh head coach Walt Harris elected to take the position at Stanford prior to the 2005 Fiesta Bowl, Wannstedt, with NFL experience and a proven college recruiting record, immediately became a candidate to replace him. As a Pittsburgh area native and former player (offensive tackle from 1971 to 1973) and previous graduate assistant coach at the university under Johnny Majors and Jackie Sherrill (having earned a B.S. in 1974 and M.Ed. in 1976 while coaching from 1975 to 1978), Wannstedt had strong ties to both the university and the city. Wannstedt was initially interested in the job but pulled back over salary issues and concerns about his ability to keep a quality staff. After working out several issues with the athletic department including pay raises for assistant coaches, Wannstedt agreed to the offer and was named head coach on December 23, 2004.

Wannstedt said that recruiting would be a top priority under his leadership. Harris had been roundly criticized during his tenure for not recruiting top high school talent, especially in the crucial and talent-laden Western Pennsylvania area. Wannstedt retained some of Harris' staff including Paul Rhoads, the defensive coordinator, but made several key changes including bringing in former Baltimore Ravens offensive coordinator Matt Cavanaugh to run his offense. Cavanaugh was the starting quarterback in 1976 and 1977 when Wannstedt was a graduate assistant coach.

==== 2005 ====
In his first season, Wannstedt inherited a Pittsburgh team that won a share of the Big East Championship and played in the Fiesta Bowl the previous year under Harris and was ranked 21st in the first AP Poll of 2005. However, defeats by Notre Dame and Ohio and a last second loss (by a score of 7–6) to Nebraska kicked off a disappointing 5–6 season that also saw Pittsburgh get humiliated 45–13 by archrival West Virginia. This campaign was the program's first losing record since 1999.

==== 2006 ====
Wannstedt's recruiting prowess led analysts to rate the Panthers' class of 2006 as among their best class in decades. Pittsburgh won six of their first seven games (with just a loss to Michigan State). The win over UCF in October proved to be their last, as a 20–10 loss to #15-ranked Rutgers started a five-game slide (with three of their losses being to ranked opponents), which included a double-overtime loss to Connecticut. Ultimately, the Panthers did not make a bowl game with their 6–6 record.

==== 2007 ====
Wannstedt followed his touted 2006 class by bringing in the #28 recruiting class in 2007. The class included blue-chip players such as RB LeSean McCoy, QB Pat Bostick, and OG Chris Jacobson. On December 1, 2007, just days before an upset win at West Virginia, Wannstedt was given a contract extension through 2012; he had previously been signed through 2009. The 13–9 upset win in the annual Backyard Brawl denied the Mountaineers a chance to play in the BCS National Championship Game and was the start of a turnaround that subsequently lifted Coach Wannstedt and the Panthers to a 9–4 season in 2008.

==== 2008 ====
The Panthers started the 2008 season ranked in the top 25 for the first time under Wannstedt's leadership (although the Panthers were ranked #25 in the pre-season before Wannstedt's first game in 2005). Starting 0–1, Pitt soon defeated Buffalo and then beat Iowa with a 21–20 victory. On Thursday, October 2, 2008, the Panthers scored an upset win over the then-ranked and undefeated #10 South Florida in a game nationally televised by ESPN. Then on Saturday, October 18, 2008, the Panthers easily defeated Navy. Upset by Rutgers, however, Pitt rebounded with a 36–33 overtime victory the following week at Notre Dame. The game, which lasted four overtime periods, was the longest game ever for both Notre Dame and Pittsburgh. After a 41–7 rout of visiting Louisville, the Panthers improved to 7–2 and were bowl-bound for the first time under Wannstedt.

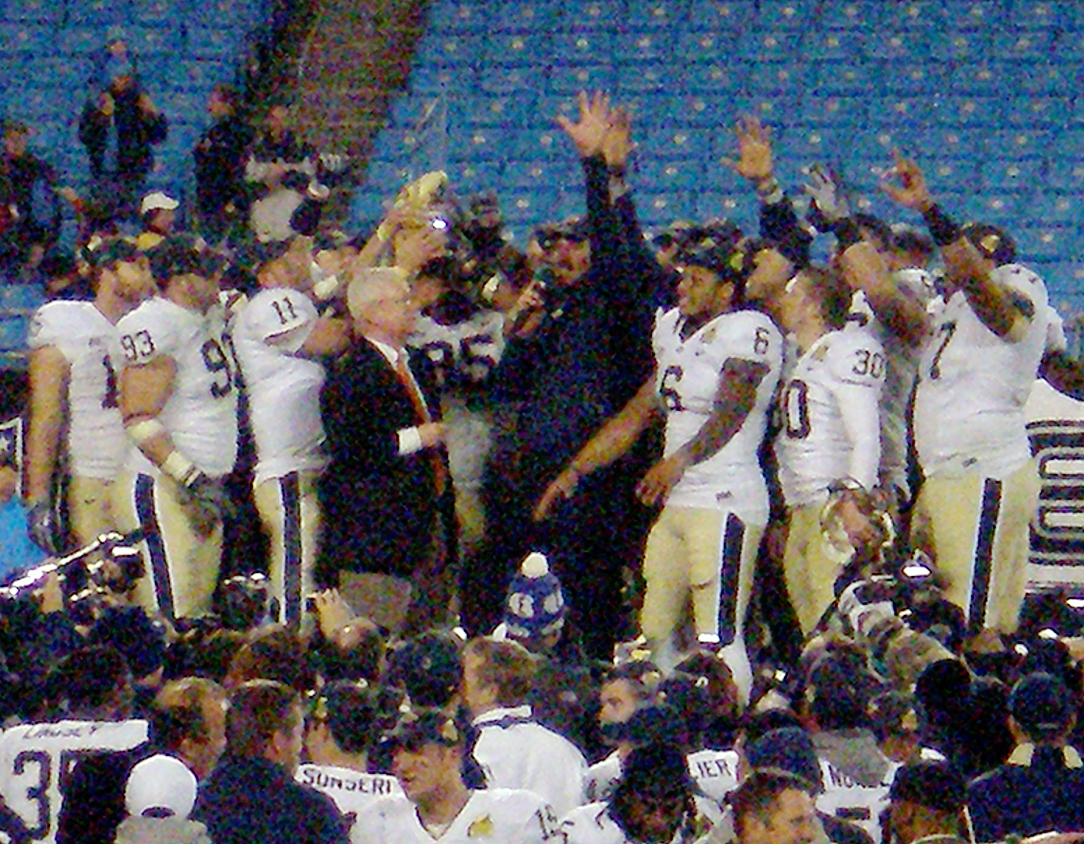
Dave Wannstedt addresses the crowd during the trophy presentation following the 2009 Meineke Car Care Bowl, in which Pitt defeated North Carolina 19–17 for Wannstedt's first bowl victory.

A loss to eventual Big East champion Cincinnati eliminated the Panthers from BCS contention. However, Coach Wannstedt stayed upbeat, and worked with defensive coordinator Phil Bennett to devise a gameplan to defeat West Virginia for the 2nd time in four years in the annual Backyard Brawl. Pitt defeated West Virginia 19–15 on the day after Thanksgiving in a national telecast on ABC. The following week the Panthers won at UConn to improve to 9–3 on the season and clinch a bid to the Sun Bowl.

On December 31, 2008, Pittsburgh was defeated in the Sun Bowl by Oregon State 3–0 in a defensive struggle.

==== 2009 ====
In 2009, Wannstedt led Pittsburgh to a 3–0 start before losing on the road to N.C. State in the fourth quarter. Wannstedt's Panthers then won their next 6 games, raising Pitt's record to 9–1 and the team cracked the Top 10 in the rankings, their best mark since the Dan Marino led team in 1982. The Panthers faltered in their final two games, however, losing to both West Virginia 19–16 and 2009 Cincinnati 45–44 in the Big East Championship game to fall to 9–3. After the regular season, Pitt went on to defeat the North Carolina Tar Heels in the 2009 Meineke Car Care Bowl to finish the season with 10 wins for the first time since 1981.

==== 2010 ====
On March 30, 2010, Wannstedt received a two-year contract extension through the 2014 season.

On December 7, 2010, Wannstedt resigned as head coach, reportedly under pressure following a disappointing 7–5 regular season and having failed to advance to a BCS bowl during his tenure. With his resignation, Wannstedt was offered a position as special assistant to the athletic director at the university. He did not coach the 2011 BBVA Compass Bowl.

=== Buffalo Bills ===
On January 21, 2011, it was announced that Wannstedt was joining the Bills staff as assistant head coach/linebackers coach under Chan Gailey, who served as Wannstedt's offensive coordinator in Miami in 2000 and 2001. He was promoted to defensive coordinator on January 2, 2012. He was dismissed, along with the entire Bills coaching staff, on December 31, 2012, after the Bills finished the season with a 6–10 record.

=== Tampa Bay Buccaneers ===
Wannstedt was hired as the Tampa Bay Buccaneers' special teams coach on February 1, 2013. He joined the staff of Greg Schiano, who was an assistant under Wannstedt with the Chicago Bears during the mid-to-late 1990s. He was let go by the Buccaneers at the end of the 2013 season.

== Television career ==
Wannstedt has been a FOX Sports football studio analyst since 2014, appears on FOX NFL Kickoff Sunday mornings during the NFL season, and was an analyst for the Chicago Bears preseason game broadcast on August 29, 2019. As of 2023, he was a host of Pro Football Weekly on NBC Sports Chicago. Starting with the 2024 NFL season, Wannstedt is the analyst on The Official Bears Postgame Live on Marquee Sports Network.

== Head coaching record ==
=== NFL ===
Team	Year	Regular season					Postseason			
Team	Year	Won	Lost	Ties	Win %	Finish	Won	Lost	Win %	Result
CHI	1993	7	9	0	.438	4th in NFC Central	—	—	—	—
CHI	1994	9	7	0	.563	4th in NFC Central	1	1	.500	Lost to San Francisco 49ers in NFC Divisional Game
CHI	1995	9	7	0	.563	3rd in NFC Central	—	—	—	—
CHI	1996	7	9	0	.438	3rd in NFC Central	—	—	—	—
CHI	1997	4	12	0	.250	5th in NFC Central	—	—	—	—
CHI	1998	4	12	0	.250	5th in NFC Central	—	—	—	—
CHI Total		40	56	0	.417		1	1	.500	
MIA	2000	11	5	0	.688	1st in AFC East	1	1	.500	Lost to Oakland Raiders in AFC Divisional Game
MIA	2001	11	5	0	.688	2nd in AFC East	0	1	.000	Lost to Baltimore Ravens in AFC Wild Card game
MIA	2002	9	7	0	.563	3rd in AFC East	—	—	—	—
MIA	2003	10	6	0	.625	2nd in AFC East	—	—	—	—
MIA	2004	1	8	0	.111	(Resigned)	—	—	—	—
MIA Total		42	31	0	.575		1	2	.333	
Total		82	87	0	.485		2	3	.400	

=== College ===
Year	Team	Overall	Conference	Standing	Bowl/playoffs	Coaches^{#}	AP^{°}
Pittsburgh Panthers (Big East Conference) (2005–2010)
2005	Pittsburgh	5–6	4–3	T–3rd			
2006	Pittsburgh	6–6	2–5	6th			
2007	Pittsburgh	5–7	3–4	T–3rd			
2008	Pittsburgh	9–4	5–2	T–2nd	L Sun		
2009	Pittsburgh	10–3	5–2	T–2nd	W Meineke Car Care	15	15
2010	Pittsburgh	7–5	5–2	T–1st	BBVA Compass^{A}		
Pittsburgh:		42–31	24–18				
Total:		42–31					
National championship Conference title Conference division title or championship game berth
^{†}Indicates Bowl Coalition, Bowl Alliance, BCS, or CFP / New Years' Six bowl.; ^{#}Rankings from final Coaches Poll.; ^{°}Rankings from final AP Poll.

- ^A Wannstedt resigned before Pittsburgh's 2010 bowl game.
