= Michael Hicks (American football) =

American football player (1973–2024)

No. 44, 22
- Position: Running back

Personal information
- Born: February 1, 1973; Barnesville, Georgia, U.S.
- Died: February 2, 2024 (aged 51); Thomaston, Georgia, U.S.
- Listed height: 6 ft 0 in (1.83 m)
- Listed weight: 190 lb (86 kg)

Career information
- High school: Robert E. Lee (Thomaston)
- College: South Carolina State
- NFL draft: 1996: 7th round, 253rd overall pick

Career history
- Chicago Bears (1996–1997); Barcelona Dragons (1997)

Career NFL statistics
- Rushing yards: 106
- Rushing average: 3.4
- Stats at Pro Football Reference

Michael Hicks (February 1, 1973 – February 2, 2024) was an American professional football player who was a running back for two seasons with the Chicago Bears of the National Football League (NFL). He then played one year with the Barcelona Dragons of NFL Europe.

Before joining the NFL, Hicks played college football for the South Carolina State Bulldogs. At South Carolina State, he held the record for most rushing touchdowns in a single-season (22) and in a career (51). He was also the career rushing leader in yards per game (127.9). As of 2024, these records still hold. In 2014, Hicks was inducted into his alma mater's hall of fame.

Hicks died in Thomaston, Georgia, on February 2, 2024, one day after his 51st birthday.
