= Marlon Forbes =

American football player (born 1971)

No. 46, 39
- Position: Cornerback

Personal information
- Born: December 25, 1971 (age 54); Brooklyn, New York, U.S.
- Listed height: 6 ft 1 in (1.85 m)
- Listed weight: 215 lb (98 kg)

Career information
- High school: Central Islip (Central Islip, New York)
- College: Penn State
- NFL draft: 1995: undrafted
- Expansion draft: 1999: 1st round, 15th overall pick

Career history
- Chicago Bears (1995–1998); Cleveland Browns (1999)

Career NFL statistics
- Tackles: 79
- Fumble recoveries: 1
- Passes defended: 2
- Stats at Pro Football Reference

Marlon Darryl Forbes (born December 25, 1971) is an American former professional football player who was a cornerback in the National Football League (NFL). Before playing in the NFL, he played college football for the Penn State Nittany Lions. He played four seasons in the NFL for the Chicago Bears from 1995 to 1998 and the Cleveland Browns in 1999.
