= Mike Dulaney =

American football player (born 1970)

No. 38, 34
- Position: Fullback

Personal information
- Born: September 9, 1970; Kingsport, Tennessee, U.S.
- Listed height: 6 ft 0 in (1.83 m)
- Listed weight: 237 lb (108 kg)

Career information
- High school: Dobyns-Bennett (Kingsport)
- College: North Carolina
- NFL draft: 1993: undrafted

Career history
- Cincinnati Bengals (1993)*; Albany Firebirds (1994–1995); Chicago Bears (1995–1997); Carolina Panthers (1998)
- * Offseason or practice squad member only

Career NFL statistics
- Receptions: 3
- Receiving yards: 23
- Touchdowns: 1
- Stats at Pro Football Reference

Mike Faulkerson Dulaney (born September 9, 1970) is an American former professional football player who was a fullback in the National Football League (NFL) for the Chicago Bears and Carolina Panthers. He played college football for the North Carolina Tar Heels.

== Early life ==
Dulaney was born in Kingsport, Tennessee, where he attended Dobyns-Bennett High School.

== College career ==
He played college football at the University of North Carolina at Chapel Hill. He was a three-year letterman and three-year starter for the Tar Heels. In 1992, he served as a team captain and ended his senior season as part of a team that won the 1993 Peach Bowl over Miss St. Georgia Dome Atlanta, GA.

== Professional career ==
In 1996, he led the Bears in special teams tackles with 17 solo tackles and 5 assisted tackles with 2 caused fumbles. He was a 1996 Pro Bowl nominee as a special teams player.

He is credited with one preseason touchdown (against the Pittsburgh Steelers) and one in the regular season touchdown (versus the Detroit Lions).
