= Marcus Spears (offensive tackle) =

American football player (born 1971)

No. 72, 76, 70, 68
- Position: Offensive tackle

Personal information
- Born: September 28, 1971 (age 55); Baton Rouge, Louisiana, U.S.
- Listed height: 6 ft 4 in (1.93 m)
- Listed weight: 320 lb (145 kg)

Career information
- High school: Belaire (Baton Rouge)
- College: Northwestern State (LA)
- NFL draft: 1994: 2nd round, 39th overall pick

Career history
- Chicago Bears (1994–1996); Amsterdam Admirals (1996); Green Bay Packers (1997)*; Kansas City Chiefs (1997–2003); Houston Texans (2004); Cleveland Browns (2005)*; Indianapolis Colts (2005)*
- * Offseason or practice squad member only

Awards and highlights
- First-team All-American (1993)

Career NFL statistics
- Games Played: 103
- Games Started: 21
- Fumble recoveries: 4
- Stats at Pro Football Reference

Marcus DeWayne Spears (born September 28, 1971) is an American former professional football player who was an offensive tackle in the National Football League (NFL). He played college football for the Northwestern State Demons before being selected in the second round of the 1994 NFL draft by the Chicago Bears with the 39th overall pick. He also played for the Kansas City Chiefs and Houston Texans. He is a member of Omega Psi Phi fraternity.

Pre-draft measurables
Height	Weight	Arm length	Hand span	40-yard dash	10-yard split	20-yard split	20-yard shuttle	Vertical jump
6 ft 4 1/4 in (1.94 m)	302 lb (137 kg)	33 in (0.84 m)	9 3/8 in (0.24 m)	5.27 s	1.87 s	3.06 s	4.68 s	25.0 in (0.64 m)
