= Myron Baker =

American football player (born 1971)

No. 91, 56, 53
- Position: Linebacker

Personal information
- Born: January 6, 1971 (age 55); Haughton, Louisiana, U.S.
- Listed height: 6 ft 1 in (1.85 m)
- Listed weight: 232 lb (105 kg)

Career information
- High school: Haughton
- College: Louisiana Tech
- NFL draft: 1993: 4th round, 100th overall pick

Career history
- Chicago Bears (1993–1995); Carolina Panthers (1996); Chicago Bears (1997)*; Carolina Panthers (1997); Indianapolis Colts (1998)*
- * Offseason or practice squad member only

Career NFL statistics
- Tackles: 45
- Fumble recoveries: 3
- Touchdowns: 2
- Stats at Pro Football Reference

Myron Tobias Baker (born January 6, 1971) is an American former professional football player who was a linebacker in the National Football League (NFL). He was selected by the Chicago Bears in the fourth round of the 1993 NFL draft with the 100th overall pick. He played for the Bears from 1993 to 1995 and the Carolina Panthers from 1996 to 1997. He played college football for the Louisiana Tech Bulldogs. 1991 Second team All-South Independent Football team selection, 1992 First team All-IFA
