= Anthony Marshall (American football) =

American football player (born 1970)

No. 36, 35
- Position: Safety

Personal information
- Born: April 16, 1970 (age 56); Mobile, Alabama, U.S.
- Listed height: 6 ft 1 in (1.85 m)
- Listed weight: 212 lb (96 kg)

Career information
- High school: LeFlore Magnet (Mobile)
- College: LSU
- NFL draft: 1994: undrafted

Career history
- Chicago Bears (1994–1997); New York Jets (1997); Philadelphia Eagles (1998); Minnesota Vikings (2000)*; Memphis Maniax (2001)
- * Offseason or practice squad member only

Awards and highlights
- Second-team All-SEC (1993)

Career NFL statistics
- Total tackles: 70
- Sacks: 3
- Forced fumbles: 2
- Fumble recoveries: 3
- Interceptions: 5
- Stats at Pro Football Reference

Anthony Dewayne Marshall (born April 16, 1970) is an American former professional football player who was a safety in the National Football League (NFL). He played college football for the LSU Tigers. He played five seasons in the NFL for the Chicago Bears, New York Jets, and Philadelphia Eagles. After winding down his career in the NFL, Marshall finished his football career by playing for the Memphis Maniax of the XFL. "AM" as was his nickname in his playing days, claims Bill Parcells was one of his best coaches, and claims he would follow that man anywhere.
