= James Burton (American football) =

American football player (born 1971)

No. 35
- Position: Defensive back

Personal information
- Born: April 27, 1971 (age 55); Torrance, California, U.S.
- Listed height: 5 ft 9 in (1.75 m)
- Listed weight: 184 lb (83 kg)

Career information
- High school: Long Beach Polytechnic (Long Beach, California)
- College: Hawaii; Fresno State
- NFL draft: 1994: 5th round, 151st overall pick

Career history
- Kansas City Chiefs (1994)*; Chicago Bears (1994–1997); Seattle Seahawks (1998)*
- * Offseason or practice squad member only

Awards and highlights
- First-team All-WAC (1993)

Career NFL statistics
- Tackles: 67
- Interceptions: 1
- Stats at Pro Football Reference

James Krajeck Burton (born April 27, 1971) is an American former professional football player who was a defensive back for four seasons with the Chicago Bears of the National Football League (NFL). He played college football for the Hawaii Rainbow Warriors, before transferring to Fresno State and was selected by the Kansas City Chiefs in the fifth round of the 1994 NFL draft with the 151st overall pick.
