= Fabien Bownes =

American football player (born 1972)

No. 88, 82, 19, 83
- Position: Wide receiver

Personal information
- Born: February 29, 1972 (age 54); Aurora, Illinois, U.S.
- Listed height: 5 ft 11 in (1.80 m)
- Listed weight: 192 lb (87 kg)

Career information
- High school: Waubonsie Valley (IL)
- College: Western Illinois
- NFL draft: 1995: undrafted

Career history
- Chicago Bears (1995–1998); Seattle Seahawks (1999–2001)

Career NFL statistics
- Receptions: 21
- Receiving yards: 283
- Touchdowns: 2
- Stats at Pro Football Reference

Fabien Alfranso Bownes (born February 29, 1972, in Aurora, Illinois) is an American former professional football player who was a wide receiver in the National Football League. He played college football for the Western Illinois Leathernecks. He played in the NFL for six seasons with the Chicago Bears (1995, 1997–1998) and the Seattle Seahawks (1999–2001).

Bownes also ran track and graduated from Western Illinois University with a major in communication. He began graduate studies in Communication during his last semester at that university, when he participated in on-campus tryouts for National Football League teams. He also has a brother that plays tennis for Western Illinois.
