= Carl Reeves =

American football player (born 1971)

No. 68
- Position: Defensive end

Personal information
- Born: December 17, 1971 (age 54); Durham, North Carolina, U.S.
- Listed height: 6 ft 4 in (1.93 m)
- Listed weight: 270 lb (122 kg)

Career information
- High school: Northern Durham
- College: NC State (1991–1994)
- NFL draft: 1995: 6th round, 198th overall pick

Career history
- Chicago Bears (1995–1998); Denver Broncos (1999)*; Carolina Cobras (2000–2001)
- * Offseason or practice squad member only

Awards and highlights
- 2× Second-team All-ACC (1992, 1994)

Career NFL statistics
- Tackles: 39
- Sacks: 1.5
- Fumble recoveries: 1
- Stats at Pro Football Reference

Carl Donmark Reeves (born December 17, 1971) is an American former professional football player who was a defensive end for the Chicago Bears of the National Football League (NFL). He played college football for the NC State Wolfpack. He was selected by the Bears in the sixth round of the 1995 NFL draft.
