= Albert Fontenot =

American football player (born 1970)

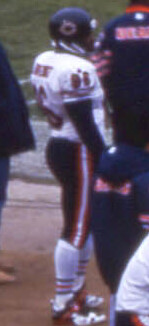
- Fontenot with the Bears in 1995

No. 74, 96, 99, 95
- Positions: Defensive end, defensive tackle

Personal information
- Born: September 17, 1970 (age 56); Houston, Texas, U.S.
- Listed height: 6 ft 4 in (1.93 m)
- Listed weight: 287 lb (130 kg)

Career information
- High school: Yates (Houston, Texas)
- College: Baylor
- NFL draft: 1993: 4th round, 112th overall pick

Career history
- Chicago Bears (1993–1996); Indianapolis Colts (1997–1998); San Diego Chargers (1999–2001)

Awards and highlights
- Second-team All-American (1992); First-team All-SWC (1992)

Career NFL statistics
- Tackles: 218
- Sacks: 27.5
- Fumble recoveries: 6
- Stats at Pro Football Reference

Albert Fontenot (born September 17, 1970) is an American former professional football player for the Chicago Bears of the National Football League (NFL). The defensive lineman was a fourth-round draft pick in 1993 NFL draft by the Bears out of Baylor.
