= Joe Cain (American football) =

American football player (born 1965)

No. 59
- Position: Linebacker

Personal information
- Born: June 11, 1965 (age 61); Los Angeles, California, U.S.
- Listed height: 6 ft 1 in (1.85 m)
- Listed weight: 242 lb (110 kg)

Career information
- High school: Compton (Compton, California)
- College: Stanford; Oregon Tech
- NFL draft: 1988: 8th round, 210th overall pick

Career history
- Minnesota Vikings (1988)*; Seattle Seahawks (1989–1992); Chicago Bears (1993–1996); Seattle Seahawks (1997)
- * Offseason or practice squad member only

Career NFL statistics
- Games played: 131
- Tackles: 415
- Sacks: 1
- Interceptions: 3
- Stats at Pro Football Reference

Joseph Harrison Cain Jr. (born June 11, 1965) is an American former professional football player who was a linebacker for nine seasons in the National Football League (NFL). He played college football for the Stanford Cardinal and Oregon Tech Owls before being selected by the Minnesota Vikings in the eighth round of the 1988 NFL draft.

Cain graduated in 1983 from Compton High School in Compton, California. He attended Stanford University on an academic scholarship, and joined their football team as a walk-on. He later transferred to Oregon Institute of Technology, after Greg McMackin, who was the assistant linebackers coach at Stanford, obtained the head coaching position.

Cain is executive chef at a cafe on Orcas Island in Washington state. He is a father of three children and grandfather of one.
