= Chris Gedney =

American football player (1970–2018)

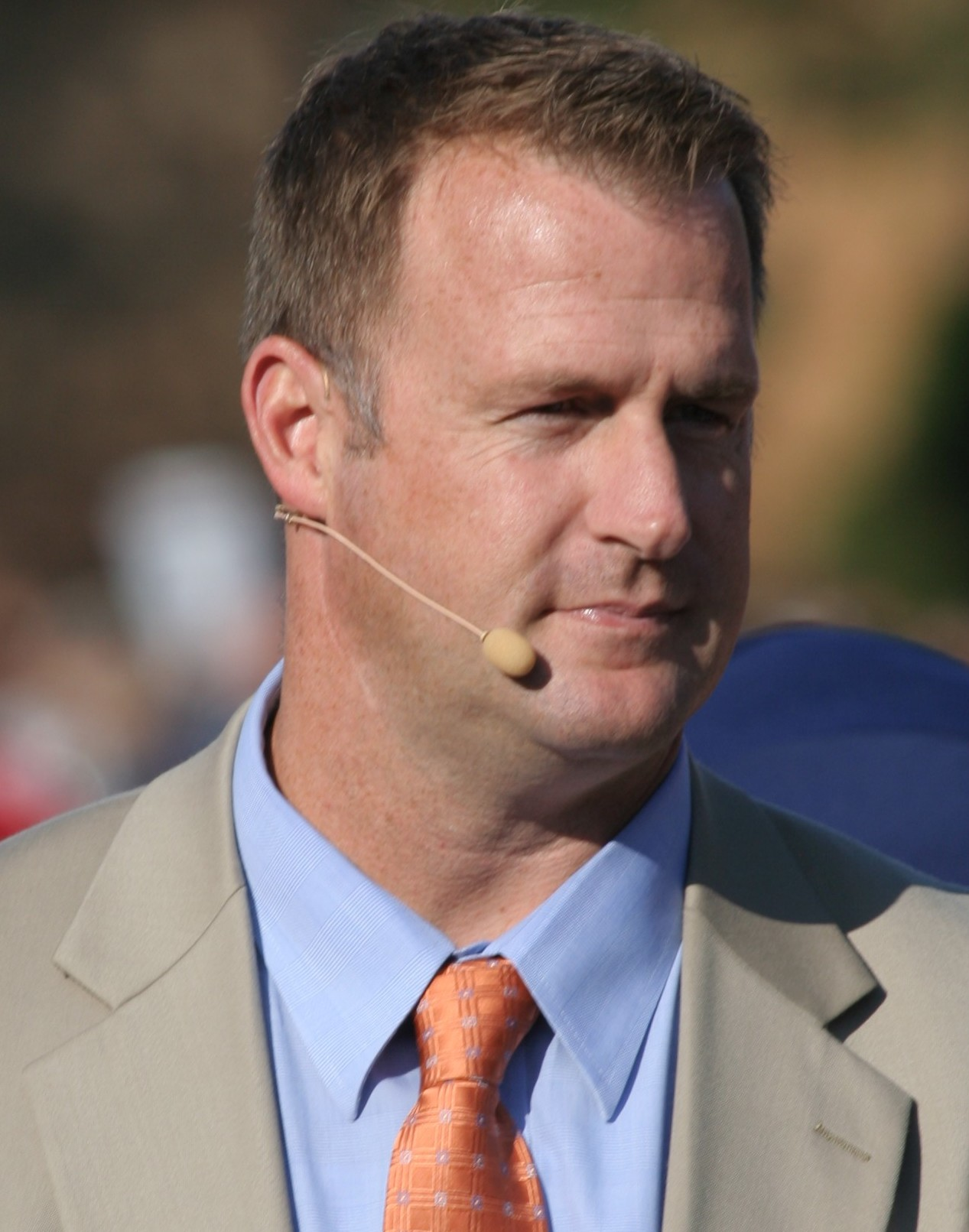
- Gedney in 2009

No. 84
- Position: Tight end

Personal information
- Born: August 9, 1970; Wilmington, Delaware, U.S.
- Died: March 9, 2018 (aged 47); Syracuse, New York, U.S.
- Listed height: 6 ft 5 in (1.96 m)
- Listed weight: 258 lb (117 kg)

Career information
- High school: Liverpool (Liverpool, New York)
- College: Syracuse
- NFL draft: 1993: 3rd round, 61st overall pick

Career history
- Chicago Bears (1993–1996); Arizona Cardinals (1997–2000)

Awards and highlights
- Unanimous All-American (1992)

Career NFL statistics
- Receptions: 83
- Receiving yards: 914
- Touchdowns: 8
- Stats at Pro Football Reference

Christopher Joseph Gedney (August 9, 1970 – March 9, 2018) was an American professional football player who was a tight end for six seasons in the National Football League (NFL). He played college football for the Syracuse Orange, earning unanimous All-American honors in 1992. He played professionally for the Chicago Bears and Arizona Cardinals of the NFL. After his football career ended, he served as assistant athletics director at Syracuse University.

== Early life ==
Gedney was born in Wilmington, Delaware. He graduated from Liverpool High School, where he played high school football for the Liverpool Warriors.

== College career ==
While attending Syracuse University, he played for the Syracuse Orange football team from 1989 to 1992. As a senior in 1992, he was recognized as a consensus first-team All-American.

== Professional career ==
The Chicago Bears selected Gedney in the third round (61st overall pick) in the 1993 NFL draft. He played for the Bears from 1993 to 1995.

He later played for the Arizona Cardinals from 1997 to 2000. His most productive season came in 1997, where he caught 23 passes for 261 yards and 4 touchdowns.

== Life after football ==
Gedney lived in Syracuse, New York. He previously worked as the Development Liaison for the Syracuse Football Lettermen's Club and was an analyst for the Syracuse Sports Network.

On April 29, 2010, Gedney was promoted to Senior Associate Athletic Director for Major Gifts at Syracuse University.

== Death ==
Gedney died by suicide on March 9, 2018, by gunshot to the neck aged 47. A brain autopsy performed by the Boston University CTE Center and Brain Bank determined that Gedney had had stage II chronic traumatic encephalopathy.
