= Robert Green (American football) =

American football player (born 1970)

No. 39, 22, 32
- Position: Running back

Personal information
- Born: September 10, 1970 (age 56); Washington, D.C., U.S.
- Listed height: 5 ft 8 in (1.73 m)
- Listed weight: 212 lb (96 kg)

Career information
- High school: Friendly
- College: William & Mary
- NFL draft: 1992: undrafted

Career history
- Washington Redskins (1992); Chicago Bears (1993–1996); Minnesota Vikings (1997)
- Stats at Pro Football Reference

Robert David Green (born September 10, 1970) is an American former professional football player who was a running back in the National Football League (NFL) for the Washington Redskins, the Minnesota Vikings, and the Chicago Bears. He played college football for the William & Mary Tribe. He recorded NFL career totals of 1,038 yards rushing on 221 carries, 596 yards receiving, and 256 yards of kick returns in six seasons.

He is currently a Health Issues and Personal Fitness teacher at Oxon Hill High School in Oxon Hill, Maryland. He also has two daughters and two sons.
