= Jeremy Lincoln =

American football player (born 1969)

No. 39, 25
- Position: Cornerback

Personal information
- Born: April 7, 1969 (age 57); Toledo, Ohio, U.S.
- Listed height: 5 ft 10 in (1.78 m)
- Listed weight: 180 lb (82 kg)

Career information
- High school: Thomas DeVilbiss
- College: Tennessee
- NFL draft: 1992: 3rd round, 80th overall pick

Career history
- Chicago Bears (1992–1995); St. Louis Rams (1996); Seattle Seahawks (1997); New York Giants (1998–1999); Denver Broncos (2000)*; Green Bay Packers (2000)*; Detroit Lions (2000)
- * Offseason or practice squad member only

Awards and highlights
- First-team All-SEC (1991)

Career NFL statistics
- Tackles: 224
- Interceptions: 8
- Fumble recoveries: 3
- Stats at Pro Football Reference

Jeremy Arlo Lincoln (born April 7, 1969) is an American football cornerback who played eight seasons in the National Football League (NFL). He was drafted by the Chicago Bears in the third round of the 1992 NFL Draft with the 80th overall pick.

Lincoln played football and ran track at DeVilbiss High School (Toledo, Ohio), where he was part of the 1987 Ohio High School state championship track team before attending the University of Tennessee. He is most famous for the blocked field goal attempt in the last seconds of the Vols' "Miracle in South Bend" victory against Notre Dame where he blocked the field goal with his butt.
