= Kevin Miniefield =

American football player (born 1970)

No. 24, 21
- Position: Cornerback

Personal information
- Born: March 2, 1970 (age 56); Phoenix, Arizona, U.S.
- Listed height: 5 ft 9 in (1.75 m)
- Listed weight: 182 lb (83 kg)

Career information
- High school: Camelback (Phoenix)
- College: Arizona State
- NFL draft: 1993: 8th round, 201st overall pick

Career history
- Detroit Lions (1993)*; Chicago Bears (1993–1996); Arizona Cardinals (1997)
- * Offseason or practice squad member only

Awards and highlights
- First-team All-Pac-10 (1992)

Career NFL statistics
- Tackles: 100
- Interceptions: 3
- Sacks: 1.5
- Stats at Pro Football Reference

Kevin Lamar Miniefield (born March 2, 1970) is an American former professional football player who was a cornerback in the National Football League (NFL). He played college football for the Arizona State Sun Devils and was selected by the Detroit Lions in the eighth round of the 1993 NFL draft. Miniefield also played for the Chicago Bears and Arizona Cardinals.

Miniefield has four children with his wife Blake Miniefield: Kylie Miniefield, Bryce Miniefield, Kevin "KJ" Miniefield and Bailey Miniefield. Kylie Miniefield served as captain of the Arizona State University women's soccer team and graduated from the Sandra Day O'Connor College of Law and W.P. Carey School of Business. Bryce Miniefield competes on the University of Nevada, Las Vegas women's soccer team. Kevin "KJ" Miniefield is a dual-sport athlete competing in both football and track and field at Desert Ridge High School. Bailey Miniefield is also a dual-sport athlete and competes as a level 10 gymnast at Gold Medal Gymnastics and cheers at Hamilton High School.
