= Todd Perry (American football) =

American football player (born 1970)

No. 75
- Position: Guard

Personal information
- Born: November 28, 1970 (age 55); Elizabethtown, Kentucky, U.S.
- Listed height: 6 ft 5 in (1.96 m)
- Listed weight: 310 lb (141 kg)

Career information
- High school: North Hardin (Radcliff, Kentucky)
- College: Kentucky
- NFL draft: 1993: 4th round, 97th overall pick

Career history
- Chicago Bears (1993–2000); Miami Dolphins (2001–2003)

Awards and highlights
- Second-team All-SEC (1992)

Career NFL statistics
- Games played: 165
- Games started: 144
- Fumble recoveries: 2
- Stats at Pro Football Reference

Todd Perry (born November 28, 1970) is an American former professional football player who was a guard in the National Football League (NFL). He was selected by the Chicago Bears in the fourth round of the 1993 NFL draft. He played college football for the Kentucky Wildcats from 1989 to 1992. He played high school football at North Hardin High School and was Inducted into the North Hardin Trojan Athletic Hall of Fame in 2007.

Perry played eight seasons with the Bears and three with the Miami Dolphins.

Perry was inducted into the Kentucky Pro Football Hall of Fame in 2017.
