= Carl Simpson =

American football player (born 1970)

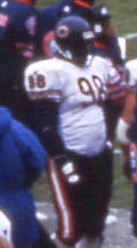
- Simpson with the Bears in 1995

No. 98, 78, 72
- Position: Defensive tackle

Personal information
- Born: April 18, 1970 (age 56); Vidalia, Georgia, U.S.
- Listed height: 6 ft 2 in (1.88 m)
- Listed weight: 292 lb (132 kg)

Career information
- High school: Appling County (Baxley, Georgia)
- College: Florida State
- NFL draft: 1993: 2nd round, 35th overall pick

Career history
- Chicago Bears (1993–1997); Arizona Cardinals (1998–1999); Las Vegas Outlaws (XFL) (2001); Tampa Bay Storm (2002)

Career NFL statistics
- Tackles: 136
- Sacks: 7.5
- Forced fumbles: 3
- Stats at Pro Football Reference

Carl Simpson (born April 18, 1970) is an American former professional football player who was a defensive tackle in the National Football League (NFL). He played college football for the Florida State Seminoles.

== Biography ==
Simpson was born in Vidalia, Georgia. He graduated from Appling County High School in Baxley Georgia. Simpson attended Florida State University, and was a student and a letterman in football. In football, he was a two-year starter as a defensive lineman, as a junior he was a First Team All-South Independent, as a senior, he was a first-team All-Atlantic Coast Conference selection.

== Professional career ==
He was selected by the Chicago Bears in the second round (35th overall) of the 1993 NFL Draft. In 5 seasons with the Bears and 1 season with the Arizona Cardinals, he recorded 7.5 sacks.
