= Ivan Fears =

American football coach (born 1954)

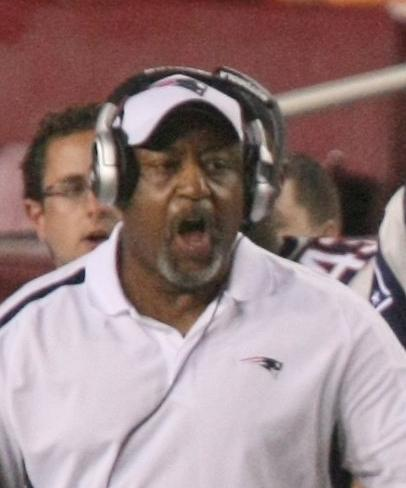
- Fears in 2009

Personal information
- Born: November 15, 1954 (age 71); Portsmouth, Virginia, U.S.

Career information
- High school: Suffolk (VA) John Yeates
- College: William & Mary

Career history
- William & Mary (1976) Graduate assistant; William & Mary (1977) Wide receivers coach; William & Mary (1978–1979) Quarterbacks coach; Syracuse (1980–1990) Wide receivers coach; New England Patriots (1991–1992) Wide receivers coach; Chicago Bears (1993–1998) Wide receivers coach; New England Patriots (1999–2001) Wide receivers coach; New England Patriots (2002–2021) Running backs coach

Awards and highlights
- 6× Super Bowl champion (XXXVI, XXXVIII, XXXIX, XLIX, LI, LIII)

Ivan Fears (born November 15, 1954) is an American former football coach. He was the running backs coach for the New England Patriots of the National Football League (NFL) from 2002 to 2021.

== Playing career ==
=== High school ===
Fears attended John Yeates High School in Suffolk, Virginia, and was a letterman in football. In football, he was twice named the school's "Outstanding Player of the Year", and as a senior, was also an All-State selection. He attended The College of William & Mary, where he played football as a running back from 1973 to 1975.

== Coaching career ==
=== College ===
Fears began his coaching career in 1976 with his alma mater, William & Mary as a graduate assistant and in 1977-1978 was the team's Receivers coach. In 1979, he served as the team's quarterbacks coach before moving to Syracuse University in 1980 as the wide receivers coach.

=== NFL ===
Fears joined the Patriots' coaching staff in 1991. He spent two seasons with the Patriots before moving on to coach the Chicago Bears' wide receivers starting in 1993, but rejoined the New England coaching staff in 1999 as their wide receivers coach. In 2002, he was reassigned to running backs coach. Fears won six Super Bowls as an integral part of both dynasties with the Patriots. He announced his retirement in 2022.
