= Ryan Wetnight =

American football player (1970–2020)

No. 83, 89
- Position: Tight end

Personal information
- Born: November 5, 1970; Fresno, California, U.S.
- Died: May 1, 2020 (aged 49); Simi Valley, California, U.S.
- Listed height: 6 ft 2 in (1.88 m)
- Listed weight: 210 lb (95 kg)

Career information
- High school: Hoover (Fresno)
- College: Stanford
- NFL draft: 1993: undrafted

Career history
- Chicago Bears (1993–1999); Green Bay Packers (2000)

Career NFL statistics
- Receptions: 175
- Receiving yards: 1,542
- Receiving TDs: 9
- Stats at Pro Football Reference

Ryan Wetnight (November 5, 1970 – May 1, 2020) was an American professional football player who was a tight end for eight seasons with the Chicago Bears and Green Bay Packers in the National Football League (NFL). He finished his career with 175 receptions for 1,542 yards and 9 touchdowns in 101 games.

Upon concluding his playing career, Wetnight became a real estate broker in California. In 2019, he was hired as the wide receivers coach at Grace Brethren High School.

In 2018, he was diagnosed with gastric cancer. Although the cancer was treated by January 2019, an inoperable tumor developed near his stomach later that year. Wetnight died on May 1, 2020, at 49.
