= Clarence Brooks (American football) =

American football coach (1951–2016)

Personal information
- Born: May 20, 1951; New York City, New York, U.S.
- Died: September 17, 2016 (aged 65); Weston, Florida, U.S.

Career history
- Massachusetts (1976–1980) Defensive line coach; Syracuse (1981–1986) Outside linebackers coach; Syracuse (1987–1989) Defensive line coach; Arizona (1990–1992) Defensive line coach; Chicago Bears (1993–1998) Defensive line coach; Cleveland Browns (1999) Defensive line coach; Miami Dolphins (2000–2004) Defensive line coach; Baltimore Ravens (2005–2015) Defensive line coach; Baltimore Ravens (2016) Senior defensive assistant coach

Awards and highlights
- Super Bowl champion (XLVII)

Clarence Brooks (May 20, 1951 – September 17, 2016) was an American football coach. He was the defensive line coach of the Baltimore Ravens from 2005 to 2015. He also served as an assistant coach for the Chicago Bears, Cleveland Browns and Miami Dolphins.

Brooks won Super Bowl XLVII as part of the Ravens' coaching staff.

He died of esophageal cancer on September 17, 2016, in Weston, Florida at age 65.
