= Ron Cox (American football) =

American football player (born 1968)

No. 54
- Position: Linebacker

Personal information
- Born: March 29, 1968 (age 58); Fresno, California, U.S.
- Listed height: 6 ft 2 in (1.88 m)
- Listed weight: 235 lb (107 kg)

Career information
- High school: Washington Union (Easton, California)
- College: Fresno State
- NFL draft: 1990: 2nd round, 33rd overall pick

Career history
- Chicago Bears (1990–1995); Green Bay Packers (1996); Chicago Bears (1997)

Awards and highlights
- Super Bowl champion (XXXI); Third-team All-American (1989)

Career NFL statistics
- Tackles: 272
- Sacks: 8
- Forced fumbles: 3
- Stats at Pro Football Reference

Ronald Eugene Cox (born February 2, 1968) is an American former professional football player who was a linebacker for eight seasons in the National Football League (NFL) with the Chicago Bears and Green Bay Packers. He started as middle linebacker for the champion Packers in Super Bowl XXXI as they beat the New England Patriots. In 2001, Cox was inducted into the Fresno County Athletic Hall of Fame.

== College career ==
As a senior, Cox was a finalist for the 1989 Butkus Award, which was won by Percy Snow. Cox had 28 sacks that senior season. He was also an All-American and the Big West Conference Defensive MVP.

== Professional career ==
=== Chicago Bears ===
Cox was selected by the Chicago Bears in the second round (33rd overall) of the 1990 NFL draft. His rookie year, 1990, was his best year in terms of sacks, with three. After a dip in productivity in 1991, Cox saw a career year in 1992, with 56 tackles, a sack, a fumble recovery, and three games started. Recording his first interception in 1995, Cox left in free agency to go to the Green Bay Packers. He returned to the team in 1997 but retired to spend time with his family.

=== Green Bay Packers ===
In the 1996 offseason, the Green Bay Packers signed Cox to a three-year contract worth $3.9 million. He was pushed into the starting lineup for Super Bowl XXXI after an injury to George Koonce.

== Coaching career ==
Cox serves as a defensive coach for Division III Lake Forest College. He has turned down offers to be on the coaching staff from Ron Rivera of the Carolina Panthers and Leslie Frazier of the Minnesota Vikings.

== Personal life ==
Cox graduated with a degree in electrical engineering. After retiring, he worked in the building industry. He and his wife Michelle have three kids, Kelsey, Caitlin, and Ron Jr., and they live in Lake Forest, Illinois.
