= Todd Burger =

American football player (born 1970)

No. 63, 62
- Position: Guard

Personal information
- Born: March 20, 1970 (age 56); Clark, New Jersey, U.S.
- Listed height: 6 ft 3 in (1.91 m)
- Listed weight: 303 lb (137 kg)

Career information
- High school: Arthur L. Johnson (Clark)
- College: Penn State
- NFL draft: 1993: undrafted

Career history
- Chicago Bears (1993–1997); New York Jets (1998); Pittsburgh Steelers (2000)*
- * Offseason or practice squad member only

Career NFL statistics
- Games played: 62
- Games Started: 40
- Fumble recoveries: 4
- Stats at Pro Football Reference

Todd Richard Burger (born March 20, 1970) is an American former professional football player who was a guard in the National Football League (NFL). He played college football for the Penn State Nittany Lions.

Burger grew up in Clark, New Jersey, and is a graduate of Arthur L. Johnson High School. He attended Penn State University where he played four years under coach Joe Paterno. In his professional career, he played in 62 games and recovered four of his team's fumbles. He has a wife, Denise and two children, Todd and Lucy Burger.

In December 2007, Burger was arrested along with 4 others and charged on third-degree charges of promoting gambling and conspiracy to promote gambling. Burger was acting as an agent for the gambling ring. His job was to steer gamblers to Anthony Pecoraro for a percentage of the generated gambling money. The bets were placed through a website called www.beteastsports.com and it was connected to the gambling ring. Thousands of dollars of bets were placed illegally over the course of a month according to the prosecutor's report.
