= 1987 Chicago Bears season =

NFL team season

- Head coach: Mike Ditka
- Offensive coordinator: Ed Hughes
- Defensive coordinator: Vince Tobin
- Home stadium: Soldier Field

Results
- Record: 11–4
- Division place: 1st NFC Central
- Playoffs: Lost Divisional Playoffs (vs. Redskins) 17–21

The 1987 season was the Chicago Bears' 68th in the National Football League the 18th post-season completed in the NFL, and their sixth under head coach Mike Ditka. The team was looking to return to the playoffs, win the NFC Central Division for the fourth consecutive year and avenge their loss in the Divisional Playoffs to the Washington Redskins the year before when the team finished 14–2.

However, the Bears failed to improve on their 14–2 record from 1986, with the team finishing at 11–4 in the strike-shortened season. Their record was once again good enough for the division title and the #2 seed in the conference, as the team had done the year before. The team also saw the same result as 1986 as the Bears suffered a second consecutive loss to the Redskins, who went on to win Super Bowl XXII, in the Divisional Playoffs.

On November 22, WGN-TV aired a report during its 9 p.m. news on that afternoon's game against the Detroit Lions when the broadcast was interrupted by the Max Headroom signal hijacking.

== Offseason ==
=== Draft ===
1987 Chicago Bears draft
Round	Pick	Player	Position	College	Notes
1	26	Jim Harbaugh *	Quarterback	Michigan	
2	54	Ron Morris	Wide receiver	SMU	
4	101	Sean Smith	Defensive tackle	Grambling State	
5	120	Steve Bryan	Defensive end	Oklahoma	
5	138	Will Johnson	Linebacker	Northeast Louisiana	
6	154	John Adickes	Center	Baylor	
7	193	Archie Harris	Offensive tackle	William & Mary	
8	221	Paul Migliazzo	Linebacker	Oklahoma	
9	249	Lakei Heimuli	Running back	BYU	
10	277	Dick Chapura	Defensive tackle	Missouri	
11	305	Tim Jessie	Running back	Auburn	
12	333	Eric Jeffries	Defensive back	Texas	
Made roster * Made at least one Pro Bowl during career

=== Undrafted free agents ===
1987 undrafted free agents of note
Player	Position	College
Kevin Brown	Punter	West Texas A&M
Ronnie James Carter	Guard	Georgia Southern
George Duarte	Defensive Back	Northern Arizona
John Duvic	Kicker	Northwestern
Frank Harris	Running back	NC State
Tim Hendrix	Tight end	Tennessee
Ivan Hicks	Defensive Back	Michigan
Mike Hintz	Defensive Back	Wisconsin–Platteville
Mike January	Linebacker	Texas
Kyle Kafentzis	Defensive Back	Hawaii
Benny Mitchell	Wide receiver	Northeast Louisiana
Anthony Mosley	Running back	Fresno State
Stuart Rindy	Tackle	UW–Whitewater
Sean Payton	Quarterback	Eastern Illinois
Dave Romasko	Tight end	Carroll (MT)
Doug Rothschild	Linebacker	Wheaton
Ed Taggart	Tight end	Ohio State
Allen Wolden	Fullback	Bemidji State

== A frustrating season ==
The 1987 season proved to be a frustrating one for not only the Bears, but probably for most associating with professional football. The league endured its second strike-shortened season in the last 6 seasons, and this was a strike that truly divided teams, including Chicago.

In the city, the strike divided its players and tarnished its coach, and the season would be the last for greats such as Walter Payton, Gary Fencik (both of whom retired), Willie Gault (dealt to the Raiders), and Wilber Marshall (signed as a free agent by the Redskins).

== The makings of the 1987 strike ==
1987 started with the usual drama in Platteville-everyone wondering if Jim McMahon would play at all during the year, McMahon openly feuded with coach Mike Ditka, upset over the new signal-caller Jim Harbaugh that the team picked in the first round. Tension was also building due to strike talk that loomed- always a bad omen for a team.

First up for Chicago in 1987 was a matchup with the defending world champion New York Giants. As if this game wasn't tough enough in and of itself, it would be played on Monday Night Football, and the Bears would be led by 3rd-year QB Mike Tomczak. McMahon and Steve Fuller were injured, Doug Flutie was traded, and rookie Jim Harbaugh needed to be groomed for a few years before he would be ready. The Bears pulled it out in their typical fashion, however, trouncing the world champs by a score of 34–19 behind a remarkable performance by Tomczak who completed 20 of 34 passes for 292 yards. Dennis McKinnon delighted the Soldier Field crowd that night by returning a punt 94 yards for a touchdown, it was the longest TD Punt return in the NFL in 1987. The Bears, it appeared were back. The club won their second game against the Tampa Bay Buccaneers on September 20, then the strike of 1987 was called, forcing the cancellation of all NFL games the week of September 27.

== Replacements ==
During the first days of the strike, the league pondered what to do, as most teams' players were deeply divided over whether to strike or not. This was not 1982, everyone learned, as the league decided to hire replacement players (referred to as "scabs" and "spare Bears"), as cancelling half the season was not an option.

Mike Ditka decided to make his feelings public about the strike, as he fully backed management on the work-stoppage. He referred to the spare players as his "real" players, a move which angered the true Bears out on strike and forced the team to spend the night in Philadelphia's Veterans Stadium before their first game, to avoid crossing the pickets. This turned out to be a wound not healed easily or quickly in the months to come.

Defensive end Steve Trimble was the last Bear to wear #40 as the number was later retired in honor of Gale Sayers.

The replacement players held their foes to 29 points in three games, and posted a 2–1 record.

=== Chicago Spare Bears ===
After the league decided to use replacement players during the NFLPA strike, the following team was assembled, and was given the name "Spare Bears" by the Chicago Tribune's writer Don Pierson. The players were also known as "The Impostors of the Midway", "Bearlys" and "Chicago Bares". No regular players crossed during the strike.

1987 Chicago Bears replacement roster
Quarterbacks: 12 Steve Bradley; 8 Mike Hohensee; 17 Sean Payton; Running backs: 32 Chris Brewer; 37 Darryl Clark; 36 Frank Harris; 38 Lakei Heimuli; 46 Anthony Mosley KR; 21 Eddie Phillips; 39 Al Wolden; Wide receivers: 86 Rick Benware; 85 Todd Black; 89 Herbert Johnson; 88 Ken Knapczyk; 83 Glen Kozlowski; 80 Gary Mullen; 83 Lawrence White; Tight ends: 84 Sam Bowers; 82 Brian Glasgow; 81 Don Kindt Jr.	Offensive linemen: 67 John Arp T; 75 Chuck Harris T; 53 Brent Johnson C; 71 Jack Oliver T; 69 Stuart Rindy T; 51 Mark Rodenhauser C; 64 Jon Roehlk G; 52 Len Seward G; 73 John Wojciechowski T/G; Defensive linemen: 70 Jim Althoff DT; 94 Dick Chapura DT; 96 Greg Fitzgerald DE; 68 Sean McInerney DE; 98 Jon Norris DL; 65 Eugene Rowell DT; 60 Keith Smith DT; 93 Guy Teafatiller DT	Linebackers: 97 Bobby Bell; 59 Leonard Jackson; 94 Mike January; 92 Paul Migliazzo; 57 Eldridge Milton; 92 Raymond Morris; 91 Jay Norvell; 54 Doug Rothschild; Defensive backs: 47 Egypt Allen; 30 George Duarte PR; 35 Mike Hintz; 24 Eric Jeffries; 43 Lorenzo Lynch; 31 Bruce McCray; 49 Pete Raeford; 32 Garland Rivers; 44 Mike Stoops S; 40 Steve Trimble; Special teams: 17 Tommy Barnhardt P; 11 Kevin Brown P; 10 John Duvic K; 16 Tim Lashar K

=== Notable replacement players ===
- Sean Payton (quarterback) – coached the New Orleans Saints to victory in Super Bowl XLIV.
- Tommy Barnhardt (punter) – had a 14-year career with several teams.
- Mark Rodenhauser (center / long snapper) - kept on the team as a long snapper for the 1987 season. Had a 12-year career with seven teams.
- Lorenzo Lynch (defensive back) – had an 11-year career with 17 career interceptions.
- John Wojciechowski (offensive lineman) – had a 7-year career solely with the Bears.
- Glen Kozlowski (wide receiver/special teams) – had a 6-year career solely with the Bears.
- Mike Hohensee (quarterback) – coached the Chicago Rush to the ArenaBowl XX championship.
- Mike Stoops (safety) – former Arizona Wildcats head coach (2004–2011) and former defensive coordinator for the Oklahoma Sooners.

== After the strike ==
The strike turned out to only last four weeks, encompassing three games, and the Bears went 2–1. The teams that hired the best replacement players did themselves a favor in the end, a group of which the Bears were a part of. When the "real" 1987 resumed, Jim McMahon was back at QB, and the Bears pulled off their biggest come-from-behind win in history, beating Tampa 27–26 after trailing 20–0. The victory proved to be inspiring, as they then won the next two games, including a 26–24 victory over the Green Bay Packers at Lambeau Field. In this game, Chicago trailed with less than a minute left, when McMahon led the team down the field for a game-winning 55-yard field goal off the leg of Kevin Butler. After the kick, Butler turned and "flipped the bird" to Packer coach Forrest Gregg, in effect saying "see you later" to the coach who was finally axed after the 1987 NFL season.

After the inspiring Green Bay win, Chicago lost a close game at Mile High Stadium to the Denver Broncos 31–29 on Monday Night Football, then beat Green Bay at home and Minnesota on the road, in the infamous "Rollerdome" game (Mike Ditka referred to the Hubert H. Humphrey Metrodome by this name, prompting the Vikings' cheerleaders to parade around on skates throughout the contest.) The Bears were 10–2 with three games left, but dropped 2 of them, and struggled into the playoffs. One of those losses was a 41–0 disaster at San Francisco at the hands of the San Francisco 49ers, and Mike Ditka threw his gum at a heckling fan, prompting assault charges to be filed against him.

== Postseason ==
The Bears lost 21–17 to the Washington Redskins in the divisional playoffs. They took a 14–0 lead, but the Redskins rallied behind quarterback Doug Williams to win a playoff game in Soldier Field for the second straight season.

== Final roster ==
1987 Chicago Bears roster
Quarterbacks (QB): 14 Jim Harbaugh; 9 Jim McMahon; 18 Mike Tomczak; Running backs (RB): 35 Neal Anderson; 34 Walter Payton; 20 Thomas Sanders; 26 Matt Suhey; 33 Calvin Thomas; Wide receivers (WR): 83 Willie Gault; 29 Dennis Gentry; 85 Dennis McKinnon; 84 Ron Morris; 89 Keith Ortego; Tight ends (TE): 86 Cap Boso; 87 Emery Moorehead	Offensive linemen (OL): 54 John Adickes C; 79 Kurt Becker G; 68 Paul Blair T; 62 Mark Bortz G; 74 Jim Covert T; 63 Jay Hilgenberg C; 57 Tom Thayer G; 78 Keith Van Horne T; 73 John Wojciechowski G/T; Defensive linemen (DL): 94 Dick Chapura DT; 95 Richard Dent DE; 99 Dan Hampton DE; 90 Al Harris DE; 76 Steve McMichael DE/DT; 72 William Perry DT; 97 Sean Smith DE/DT	Linebackers (LB): 93 Will Johnson OLB; 58 Wilber Marshall OLB; 51 Jim Morrissey OLB; 91 Jay Norvell OLB; 59 Ron Rivera OLB; 50 Mike Singletary MLB; 55 Otis Wilson OLB; Defensive backs (DB): 47 Egypt Allen SS; 25 Todd Bell SS; 37 Maurice Douglass CB; 22 Dave Duerson FS; 45 Gary Fencik FS; 23 Shaun Gayle CB/S; 24 Vestee Jackson CB; 48 Reggie Phillips CB; 27 Mike Richardson CB; Special teams (ST): 17 Tommy Barnhardt P; 6 Kevin Butler K; 53 Mark Rodenhauser LS	Reserve: 70 Jim Althoff DT (IR); 81 Lew Barnes WR (IR); 4 Steve Fuller QB (IR); -- Glen Kozlowski WR (IR); 43 Lorenzo Lynch CB (IR); 46 Anthony Mosley RB (IR); -- Votie Patterson WR (IR); 65 Eugene Rowell DT (IR); 52 Larry Rubens LS (IR); 15 Bryan Wagner P (IR); 80 Tim Wrightman TE (IR); Rookies in italics

== Regular season ==
=== Schedule ===
Week	Date	Opponent	Result	Attendance
1	September 14	New York Giants	W 34–19	65,704
2	September 20	Tampa Bay Buccaneers	W 20–3	63,551
–	September 27	at Detroit Lions	Canceled	N/A
3	October 4	at Philadelphia Eagles	W 35–3	4,074
4	October 11	Minnesota Vikings	W 27–7	32,113
5	October 18	New Orleans Saints	L 17–19	46,813
6	October 25	at Tampa Bay Buccaneers	W 27–26	70,747
7	November 1	Kansas City Chiefs	W 31–28	63,498
8	November 8	at Green Bay Packers	W 26–24	53,320
9	November 16	at Denver Broncos	L 29–31	75,783
10	November 22	Detroit Lions	W 30–10	63,357
11	November 29	Green Bay Packers	W 23–10	61,638
12	December 6	at Minnesota Vikings	W 30–24	62,331
13	December 14	at San Francisco 49ers	L 0–41	63,509
14	December 20	Seattle Seahawks	L 21–34	62,518
15	December 27	at Los Angeles Raiders	W 6–3	78,019

=== Game summaries ===
==== Week 1 ====
Team	1	2	3	4	Total
Giants	7	0	6	6	19
• Bears	3	7	14	10	34

- Date: September 14
- Location: Soldier Field, Chicago, Illinois
- Game start: 8:00 p.m.
- Game weather: 62 °F (17 °C), wind 6 mph (9.7 km/h)
- Referee: Jim Tunney
- TV announcers (ABC): Frank Gifford, Al Michaels, Dan Dierdorf

==== Week 15 ====
Team	1	2	3	4	Total
• Bears	0	3	0	3	6
Raiders	3	0	0	0	3

- Date: December 27
- Location: Los Angeles Memorial Coliseum, Los Angeles, California
- Game start: 1:00 p.m.
- Game attendance: 78,019
- Game weather: 47 °F (8 °C); wind 6 mph (9.7 km/h)
- Referee: Jerry Seeman
- TV announcers (CBS): Pat Summerall and John Madden

Scoring summary
Q1	LA	Chris Bahr 48-yard field goal	LA 3–0
Q2	CHI	Kevin Butler 38-yard field goal	Tie 3–3
Q4	CHI	Kevin Butler 30-yard field goal	CHI 6–3

=== Standings ===
NFC Central
	W	L	T	PCT	DIV	CONF	PF	PA	STK
^{(2)} Chicago Bears	11	4	0	.733	7–0	9–2	356	282	W1
^{(5)} Minnesota Vikings	8	7	0	.533	3–5	6–6	336	335	L1
Green Bay Packers	5	9	1	.367	3–4	4–7	255	300	L2
Tampa Bay Buccaneers	4	11	0	.267	3–4	4–9	286	360	L8
Detroit Lions	4	11	0	.267	2–5	4–7	269	384	W1

== Postseason ==
Round	Date	Opponent (seed)	Result	Record	Venue	Attendance
Divisional	January 10, 1988	Washington Redskins (3)	L 17–21	0–1	Soldier Field	58,153

Washington Redskins vs. Chicago Bears – Game summary

Quarter	1	2	3	4	Total
Redskins	0	14	7	0	21
Bears	7	7	3	0	17

at Soldier Field, Chicago, Illinois

- Game time: 12:30 p.m. EST/11:30 a.m. CST
- Game attendance: 65,268
- Referee: Pat Haggerty
- TV announcers (CBS): Pat Summerall (play-by-play) and John Madden (color commentator)

Game information
- Scoring
  - CHI – Thomas 2 run (Butler kick) CHI 7–0
  - CHI – Morris 14 pass from McMahon (Butler kick) CHI 14–0
  - WAS – Rogers 3 run (Haji-Sheikh kick) CHI 14–7
  - WAS – Didier 18 pass from Williams (Haji-Sheikh kick) 14–14
  - WAS – Green 52 punt return (Haji-Sheikh kick) WAS 21–14
  - CHI – field goal Butler 25 WAS 21–17

The Redskins overcame a 14–0 Bears lead by scoring three touchdowns. Early in the first quarter, Chicago's Richard Dent forced a fumble from Washington quarterback Doug Williams that defensive tackle Steve McMichael recovered on the Redskins 30-yard line, leading to running back Calvin Thomas' 2-yard touchdown run. Later on, Washington running back George Rogers was tackled for a 1-yard loss while trying to convert a fourth and 1 from the Chicago 32-yard line. The Bears then drove 67 yards on a drive that consumed 9:04 and ended with Jim McMahon throwing a 14-yard touchdown pass to Ron Morris.

However, Washington tied the game before halftime. First, Williams' 32-yard completion to Ricky Sanders on third down and nine and his 14-yard completion to tight end Clint Didier set up a 3-yard touchdown run by Rogers with 4:51 left in the half. Then after Chicago kicker Kevin Butler missed a 48-yard field goal, Washington got the ball back with 1:51 and made a big play when a late hit by cornerback Maurice Douglass turned a 13-yard catch by Sanders into a 28-yard gain. After two receptions by Gary Clark for 23 yards, Williams tied the game with an 18-yard touchdown pass to Didier.

With 11:40 left in the third quarter, Redskins cornerback Darrell Green scored on a 52-yard punt return for a touchdown (Green injured his ribs hurdling over a Chicago defender en route to the end zone). Chicago responded with a 44-yard reception by Willie Gault that set up Butler's 25-yard field goal with 4:41 remaining in the quarter, but were shut down for the rest of the game. Green would return for just one play before leaving as a result of his injury, but Washington's defense still held on to their lead without him, intercepting three passes from McMahon in the second half.

Early in the fourth quarter, Washington drove into the Bears' red zone and sent their special teams unit to attempt a 35-yard field goal. Backup quarterback Jay Schroeder, who was the holder on the play, called an audible for a fake field goal, but due to the roaring crowd at Soldier Field, his receivers didn't hear the call. As a result, he had no one to throw to after the snap, and slipped on the 25-yard line while trying to run for a first down. Chicago then took over and drove to the Washington 14-yard line. But with just over nine minutes left in the game, McMahon's pass was intercepted by Barry Wilburn in the end zone. Later on, McMahon was intercepted again, this time by Dennis Woodberry at the Chicago 43. Three plays later, Washington attempted to put the game away with a quarterback sneak on fourth and inches, but Williams was stopped short with 1:13 left, giving the Bears one last chance to drive for a winning score. However, the Redskins defense again rose to the occasion, forcing Walter Payton out of bounds one yard short of the first-down marker on fourth down and 8.

This was the final game in the Hall of Fame career of Payton, who rushed for 85 yards and caught three passes for 20 yards. With this win, Joe Gibbs advanced to his fourth NFC Championship Game in his seven years as the Redskins head coach.

This game, along with the earlier win by the Vikings over the 49ers, would mark the first time the No. 1 and No. 2 seeds in a conference both lost. The feat has only been done twice more, in the AFC in the 2006–07 NFL playoffs with the Colts and Patriots beating the Ravens and Chargers, and again in the NFC in the 2008–09 NFL playoffs with the Cardinals beating the Panthers and Eagles defeating the Giants.

This was the seventh postseason meeting between the Redskins and Bears. Both teams split the previous six meetings.
