= Chicago Bears all-time roster (L–Z) =

1,820 players have appeared in at least one regular season or postseason game in the National Football League (NFL) for the Chicago Bears franchise since 1920. This list includes those whose last names fall between "L" and "Z". For the rest, see Chicago Bears all-time roster (A–K). This list is accurate through the end of the 2025 NFL season.

== L ==
- Corbin Lacina
- Tron LaFavor
- Joe LaFleur
- Hal Lahar
- Walt Lamb
- Greg Landry
- Jeremy Langford
- Spencer Lanning
- Jake Lanum
- Joey LaRocque
- Ted Larsen
- Ojay Larson
- Tim Lashar
- Paul Lasike
- Greg Lasker
- Greg Latta
- DeDe Lattimore
- Al Lawler
- Roger Lawson
- Bobby Layne
- Justin Layne
- Bernie Leahy
- Alex Leatherwood
- Harper LeBel
- Cre'Von LeBlanc
- Roger LeClerc
- Cameron Lee
- Elijah Lee
- Herman Lee
- Khari Lee
- Shawn Lee
- Dick Leeuwenburg
- Jay Leeuwenburg
- Earl Leggett
- Cliff Lemon
- Charles Leno
- Jimmy Lesane
- Darren Lewis
- Marcedes Lewis
- Nate Lewis
- Dennis Lick
- Jeremy Lincoln
- Bill Line
- Joe Lintzenich
- Paul Lipscomb
- Rusty Lisch
- Jody Littleton
- Virgil Livers
- Andy Livingston
- Howie Livingston
- Brandon Lloyd
- Jim Logan
- LaCale London
- Harvey Long
- Johnny Long
- Kyle Long
- Lance Louis
- Al Louis-Jean
- Colston Loveland
- Loyd Lowe
- Michael Lowery
- Cornelius Lucas
- Sid Luckman
- Johnny Lujack
- Dennis Lundy
- Vaughn Lusby
- Garry Lyle
- Dustin Lyman
- Link Lyman
- Aaron Lynch
- Lorenzo Lynch
- Babe Lyon

== M ==
- Khalil Mack
- Ledarius Mack
- Bob MacLeod
- Eddie Macon
- Kyle MacWherter
- Dante Magnani
- Ralph Maillard
- Jack Manders
- Steve Maneri
- James Maness
- John Mangum
- Joe Maniaci
- Patrick Mannelly
- Danieal Manning
- Pete Manning
- Ricky Manning
- Terrell Manning
- Eggs Manske
- Brandon Manumaleuna
- Joe Marconi
- Olindo Mare
- Bob Margarita
- Ken Margerum
- Marc Mariani
- Cassius Marsh
- Alfonso Marshall
- Anthony Marshall
- Brandon Marshall
- Wilber Marshall
- Billy Martin (born 1938)
- Billy Martin (born 1942)
- Chris Martin
- Dave Martin
- Derrick Martin
- Jacob Martin
- Sherrod Martin
- Phil Martinovich
- Matt Maslowski
- Wayne Mass
- Chris Massey
- Bobby Massie
- Bob Masters
- Bernie Masterson
- Forrest Masterson
- Gus Mastrogany
- Jack Matheson
- Ron Mattes
- Christian Matthew
- Shane Matthews
- Riley Mattson
- Al Matuza
- Marcus Maxey
- Walt May
- Alonzo Mayes
- Rufus Mayes
- Brad Maynard
- Frank Maznicki
- George McAfee
- Tre McBride
- Trumaine McBride
- Matt McCants
- Shea McClellin
- Willie McClendon
- Nick McCloud
- Darrell McClover
- Bill McColl
- Josh McCown
- Bruce McCray
- Danny McCray
- Daniel McCullers
- Les McDonald
- Ricardo McDonald
- Bucky McElroy
- Ray McElroy
- Doug McEnulty
- Jordan McFadden
- Tony McGee
- Brandon McGowan
- Gene McGuire
- Sean McInerney
- Keith McKenzie
- Jason McKie
- Phil McKinnely
- Bill McKinney
- Dennis McKinnon
- Ray McLean
- Jim McMahon
- Sherrick McManis
- Steve McMichael
- Jim McMillen
- Todd McMillon
- Danny McMullen
- Greg McMurtry
- Cade McNown
- Pernell McPhee
- Forrest McPherson
- R. W. McQuarters
- Bennie McRae
- Frank McRae
- Ed Meadows
- John Mellekas
- Henry Melton
- Cameron Meredith
- Brandon Meriweather
- Monte Merkel
- Mark Merrill
- Than Merrill
- Ahmad Merritt
- Terrence Metcalf
- Jerry Meyers
- Eddie Michaels
- Paul Migliazzo
- Joe Mihal
- Glyn Milburn
- Anthony Miller
- Dub Miller
- Fred Miller
- Jim Miller
- Lamar Miller
- Ookie Miller
- Zach Miller
- Jordan Mills
- Bill Milner
- Eldridge Milton
- Barkevious Mingo
- Kevin Miniefield
- Frank Minini
- Barry Minter
- Zach Minter
- Jack Mintun
- Rick Mirer
- Charlie Mitchell
- Qasim Mitchell
- Terrance Mitchell
- Taquan Mizzell
- John Mohardt
- Keith Molesworth
- Kyle Monangai
- David Montgomery
- Randy Montgomery
- Ross Montgomery
- Will Montgomery
- Jake Moody
- Darnell Mooney
- Tipp Mooney
- Al Moore
- D. J. Moore (born 1987)
- D. J. Moore (born 1997)
- Damon Moore
- Jerry Moore
- Joe Moore
- Joshua Moore
- McNeil Moore
- Rocco Moore
- Tarvarius Moore
- Emery Moorehead
- Moses Moreno
- Anthony Morgan
- Josh Morgan
- Mike Morgan
- Bam Morris
- Frank Morris
- Johnny Morris
- Jon Morris
- Larry Morris
- Raymond Morris
- Ron Morris
- Fred Morrison
- Jim Morrissey
- Nicholas Morrow
- Jack Morton
- Bob Moser
- Anthony Mosley
- Henry Mosley
- Raheem Mostert
- Rudy Mucha
- Jerry Muckensturm
- Howard Mudd
- Al-Quadin Muhammad
- Muhsin Muhammad
- Gary Mullen
- Vern Mullen
- Matthew Mulligan
- Don Mullins
- Noah Mullins
- Fred Mundee
- Ryan Mundy
- Dennis Murphy
- Bill Murray
- Don Murry
- George Musso
- Johnny Musso
- Brad Muster
- Sam Mustipher
- Denny Myers
- Tom Myslinski

== N ==
- Bronko Nagurski
- Ryan Nall
- Clem Neacy
- Dan Neal
- Ed Neal
- Tommy Neck
- Bobby Neely
- Fred Negus
- John Neidert
- Packie Nelson
- Dick Nesbitt
- Robert Newkirk
- Luke Newman
- Billy Newsome
- Dazz Newsome
- Bob Newton
- Yannick Ngakoue
- Bilal Nichols
- Ed Nickla
- Hans Nielsen
- Kent Nix
- Troy Nolan
- Ray Nolting
- Hank Norberg
- Mark Nordquist
- Reino Nori
- Dick Norman
- Tim Norman
- Jon Norris
- Jay Norvell
- Brent Novoselsky
- Bob Nowaskey
- Mike Nugent

== O ==
- Anthony Oakley
- Terry Obee
- Dayo Odeyingbo
- Ed O'Bradovich
- Harry O'Connell
- Tommy O'Connell
- Joe Odom
- Pat O'Donnell
- Rome Odunze
- Vern Oech
- John Oelerich
- Amen Ogbongbemiga
- Ray Ogden
- Alec Ogletree
- Adewale Ogunleye
- Michael Ojemudia
- Amobi Okoye
- Michael Ola
- Jack Oliver
- Greg Olsen
- Patrick Omameh
- Frank Omiyale
- Pat O'Neill
- Red O'Quinn
- Charlie O'Rourke
- Keith Ortego
- Kyle Orton
- Jim Osborne
- Babatunde Oshinowo
- Bill Osmanski
- Joe Osmanski
- John Owens
- Jonathan Owens
- Montell Owens
- Cheta Ozougwu

== P ==
- Orlando Pace
- Stephen Paea
- Fred Pagac
- Alan Page
- Cody Parkey
- Tony Parrish
- Bob Parsons
- Lucas Patrick
- Billy Patterson
- Cordarrelle Patterson
- Markus Paul
- Logan Paulsen
- Frank Pauly
- Kevin Payne
- Sean Payton
- Walter Payton
- Pard Pearce
- Bert Pearson
- Jim Pederson
- Dan Peiffer
- Chris Penn
- Mike Pennel
- Julius Peppers
- Mac Percival
- Pete Perez
- Bob Perina
- Pete Perini
- Don Perkins
- Lonnie Perrin
- Senorise Perry
- Todd Perry
- William Perry
- Christian Peter
- Nathan Peterman
- Jason Peters
- Adrian Peterson
- Tony Peterson
- Richie Petitbon
- Dante Pettis
- John Petty
- Ross Petty
- Loyd Phillips
- Reggie Phillips
- Mike Phipps
- Brian Piccolo
- Bob Pickens
- Zacch Pickens
- Clay Pickering
- Artavis Pierce
- Kevin Pierre-Louis
- Shurron Pierson
- Bob Pifferini
- Evan Pilgrim
- Cyril Pinder
- Eddy Piñeiro
- Jerrell Pippens
- Doug Plank
- Dick Plasman
- Adam Podlesh
- Paul Podmajersky
- Bull Polisky
- Lousaka Polite
- Red Pollock
- Hamp Pool
- Tracy Porter
- Kevin Potter
- Carl Powell
- Andre President
- Pat Preston
- Terry Price
- Dan Pride
- Greg Primus
- Byron Pringle
- Stanley Pritchett
- Rex Proctor
- Ricky Proehl
- Chris Prosinski
- Mickey Pruitt
- MyCole Pruitt
- Matt Pryor
- Jim Purnell
- Mike Pyle

== Q ==
- Jonathan Quinn
- Robert Quinn

== R ==
- Mike Rabold
- Chilo Rachal
- Dan Rains
- Larry Rakestraw
- Frank Ramsey
- Bo Rather
- Jeremiah Ratliff
- Russ Reader
- Nick Reed
- Lloyd Reese
- Marcus Reese
- Carl Reeves
- Jalen Reeves-Maybin
- Gabe Reid
- Riley Reiff
- Mike Reilly
- Caesar Rentie
- Pug Rentner
- Mike Reppond
- LaRoy Reynolds
- Tom Reynolds
- Andy Rice
- Golden Richards
- Ray Richards
- Ted Richards
- JP Richardson
- Mike Richardson
- Harry Richman
- Brandon Rideau
- Riley Ridley
- Karon Riley
- Pat Riley
- Stuart Rindy
- Ron Rivera
- Steve Rivera
- Garland Rivers
- Don Rives
- Nick Roach
- Tom Roberts
- Willie Roberts
- Bernard Robertson
- Tracy Robertson
- Roy Robertson-Harris
- Allen Robinson
- Bryan Robinson
- Dominique Robinson
- Marcus Robinson
- Mark Rodenhauser
- Mirro Roder
- Jacquizz Rodgers
- Evan Rodriguez
- Jon Roehlk
- Bill Roehnelt
- Mel Rogers
- Tom Roggeman
- Antrel Rolle
- Steve Romanik
- Al Romine
- Milton Romney
- Gene Ronzani
- John Roper
- Dante Rosario
- Ted Rosequist
- Rashad Ross
- Doug Rothschild
- James Rouse
- John Roveto
- Larry Rowden
- Eugene Rowell
- Brad Rowland
- Justin Rowland
- Eddie Royal
- Larry Rubens
- J. D. Runnels
- Reggie Russell
- Rocky Ryan
- Sod Ryan
- Tim Ryan
- Ron Rydalch
- Frank Rydzewski
- Julie Rykovich

== S ==
- Nick Sacrinty
- Rashaan Salaam
- Jay Saldi
- Khari Samuel
- Jack Sanborn
- Glenell Sanders
- Thomas Sanders
- Reggie Sanderson
- Scott Sanderson
- Cairo Santos
- Dane Sanzenbacher
- Eric Saubert
- Todd Sauerbrun
- Cory Sauter
- Joe Savoldi
- Gale Sayers
- Hurles Scales
- Patrick Scales
- John Schiechl
- Terry Schmidt
- Michael Schofield
- Larry Schreiber
- Gene Schroeder
- Steve Schubert
- Paul Schuette
- Bill Schultz
- Jim Schwantz
- Brian Schweda
- Dick Schweidler
- Ian Scott
- James Scott
- Jonathan Scott
- Ralph Scott
- Trevor Scott
- Tyler Scott
- Greg Scruggs
- George Seals
- Bill Senn
- Wash Serini
- Bobby Setzer
- Jeff Sevy
- Noah Sewell
- Jim Seymour
- Kevin Shaffer
- Adam Shaheen
- Henry Shank
- Ron Shanklin
- John Shannon
- Darryl Sharpton
- Glenn Shaw
- Tim Shaw
- Brad Shearer
- Duke Shelley
- Alec Shellogg
- Coleman Shelton
- Daimon Shelton
- Solly Sherman
- Jerry Shipkey
- Josh Shirley
- Jason Shivers
- Hub Shoemake
- Don Shy
- John Siegal
- Trevor Siemian
- Dom Sigillo
- Clyde Simmons
- Dave Simmons
- Jerry Simmons
- Lachavious Simmons
- Carl Simpson
- Dion Sims
- Kaseem Sinceno
- Mike Singletary
- Johnny Sisk
- John Sisk Jr.
- Josh Sitton
- John Skibinski
- Buster Skrine
- Matt Slauson
- Rudy Smeja
- Allen Smith
- Antone Smith
- D'Anthony Smith
- Dick Smith
- Eric Smith
- Frankie Smith
- J. D. Smith (born 1932)
- J. D. Smith (born October 18, 1936)
- Quintin Smith
- Ray Gene Smith
- Ron Smith
- Roquan Smith
- Russ Smith
- Sean Smith
- Terell Smith
- Thomas Smith
- Vernice Smith
- Vinson Smith
- Ihmir Smith-Marsette
- Durham Smythe
- Percy Snow
- Charles Snowden
- Bob Snyder
- Revie Sorey
- Bradley Sowell
- Matt Spaeth
- Marcus Spears
- Ameer Speed
- Alonzo Spellman
- Chris Spencer
- Mike Spivey
- Jason Spriggs
- Ed Sprinkle
- Micheal Spurlock
- Damion Square
- Equanimeous St. Brown
- John St. Clair
- Ray Stachowicz
- Dick Stahlman
- Bill Staley
- John Stamper
- Norm Standlee
- Tony Stargell
- Jerry Stautberg
- Larry Steinbach
- Bill Steinkemper
- Craig Steltz
- Paul Stenn
- Steve Stenstrom
- Edward Sternaman
- Joey Sternaman
- Bob Steuber
- Tyrique Stevenson
- Reddy Steward
- Kordell Stewart
- Walt Stickel
- Roger Stillwell
- Gaylord Stinchcomb
- Lemuel Stinson
- Terry Stoepel
- Butch Stolfa
- Billy Stone
- Mike Stonebreaker
- Mike Stoops
- Derrick Strait
- George Streeter
- Larry Strickland
- Greg Stroman
- Dick Sturtridge
- Joe Stydahar
- Matt Suhey
- Frank Sullivan
- Ty Summers
- Charlie Sumner
- Vinny Sutherland
- Will Sutton
- Montez Sweat
- Jake Sweeney
- D'Andre Swift
- Bob Swisher
- Frank Szymanski

== T ==
- Paul Tabor
- Teez Tabor
- Cookie Tackwell
- Joe Tafoya
- John Tait
- David Tate
- Lars Tate
- Brian Taylor
- Chester Taylor
- Cliff Taylor
- Darrell Taylor
- Henry Taylor
- Joe Taylor
- Ken Taylor
- Lionel Taylor
- Roosevelt Taylor
- Tarzan Taylor
- Tory Taylor
- Trent Taylor
- Guy Teafatiller
- Manti Teʻo
- David Terrell
- Tom Thayer
- John Thierry
- A. J. Thomas
- Anthony Thomas
- Bob Thomas
- Calvin Thomas
- Earl Thomas
- J. T. Thomas
- Joe Thomas
- Mark Thomas
- Stan Thomas
- Chris Thompson
- Deonte Thompson
- Russ Thompson
- James Thornton
- Cliff Thrift
- Willie Thrower
- Joe Thuney
- Charles Tillman
- Lewis Tillman
- Michael Timpson
- John Timu
- Pisa Tinoisamoa
- Matt Toeaina
- Kevin Toliver
- Mel Tom
- Mike Tomczak
- Khyiris Tonga
- Jake Tonges
- Robert Tonyan
- Jack Torrance
- George Trafton
- Patrick Trahan
- Ozzy Trapilo
- Keith Traylor
- Danny Trevathan
- Steve Trimble
- Milt Trost
- Mitchell Trubisky
- Joe Tryon-Shoyinka
- Bill Tucker
- Rex Tucker
- Van Tuinei
- Christian Tupou
- Woodny Turenne
- Nick Turnbull
- Barry Turner
- Bulldog Turner
- Cecil Turner
- Shemar Turner

== U ==
- Mike Ulmer
- Mitch Unrein
- Brent Urban
- Brian Urlacher
- Lou Usher

== V ==
- Ted Vactor
- Emilio Vallez
- Keith Van Horne
- Pete Van Valkenburg
- Nathan Vasher
- James Vaughters
- Walt Veach
- Winston Venable
- Fred Venturelli
- Brock Vereen
- Ernie Vick
- Kindle Vildor
- Chris Villarrial
- Dee Virgin
- Joe Vodicka
- Tillie Voss
- Milt Vucinich

== W ==
- Tom Waddle
- Bill Wade
- Bobby Wade
- Charlie Wade
- Henry Waechter
- Clint Wager
- Barry Wagner
- Bryan Wagner
- Darwin Walker
- DeMarcus Walker
- Jahdae Walker
- Bob Wallace
- John Wallace
- Stan Wallace
- Laurie Walquist
- Steve Walsh
- Anthony Walters
- Len Walterscheid
- John Ward
- Josh Warner
- Cornelius Washington
- Fred Washington
- Harry Washington
- Ted Washington
- Bobby Watkins
- Armon Watts
- Rickey Watts
- Sterling Weatherford
- Bones Weatherly
- J'Marcus Webb
- Nsimba Webster
- Eric Weems
- Mike Wells
- Trevon Wesco
- Dante Wesley
- Ryan Wetnight
- Bob Wetoska
- Buzz Wetzel
- Markus Wheaton
- Ted Wheeler
- Wayne Wheeler
- Larry Whigham
- Danta Whitaker
- Dez White
- Kevin White
- Lawrence White
- Roy White
- Wilford White
- Cody Whitehair
- S. J. Whitman
- Dave Whitsell
- Casey Wiegmann
- Bill Wightkin
- Elijah Wilkinson
- Bob Williams
- Brock Williams
- Brooks Williams
- Caleb Williams
- Chris Williams (born 1985)
- Chris Williams (born 1987)
- Chris Williams (born 1998)
- Damien Williams
- Dave Williams
- D. J. Williams
- Edwin Williams
- Fred Williams
- Jabara Williams
- Jamar Williams
- James Williams
- Jeff Williams
- Joejuan Williams
- Marcus Williams
- Nick Williams
- Perry Williams
- Roosevelt Williams
- Roy Williams
- Teddy Williams
- Tyrone Williams
- Walt Williams
- Peter Tom Willis
- C. J. Wilson (born 1987)
- C. J. Wilson (born 1989)
- George Wilson
- Marquess Wilson
- Nemiah Wilson
- Otis Wilson
- Rod Wilson
- Troy Wilson
- Javon Wims
- Jerry Wisne
- Bryan Witzmann
- John Wojciechowski
- Al Wolden
- Garrett Wolfe
- Shawn Wooden
- Josh Woods
- Tony Woods
- Donnell Woolford
- Corey Wootton
- Tim Worley
- Cameron Worrell
- Darnell Wright
- Eric Wright
- Kendall Wright
- Major Wright
- Nahshon Wright
- Steve Wright
- Tim Wrightman
- Danny Wuerffel
- Elmer Wynne

== Y ==
- Maury Youmans
- Adrian Young
- Randy Young
- Willie Young
- George Youngblood
- Olamide Zaccheaus

== Z ==
- Emanuel Zanders
- Gust Zarnas
- Dave Zawatson
- Joe Zeller
- Vince Zizak
- Chris Zorich
- George Zorich
- Vic Zucco
