= Chicago Bears all-time roster (A–K) =

1,820 players have appeared in at least one regular season or postseason game in the National Football League (NFL) for the Chicago Bears franchise since 1920. This list includes those whose last names fall between "A" and "K". For the rest, see Chicago Bears all-time roster (L–Z). This list is accurate through the end of the 2025 NFL season.

== A ==
- Joe Abbey
- Rabih Abdullah
- Clifton Abraham
- Sam Acho
- Mike Adamle
- Anthony Adams
- Gaines Adams
- John Adams
- Kyle Adams
- Matthew Adams
- Mike Adams
- Rodney Adams
- Scott Adams
- Bralon Addison
- Mario Addison
- John Adickes
- Roy Adkins
- Al Afalava
- Louis Age
- Louie Aguiar
- Len Akin
- Ted Albrecht
- Maurice Alexander
- Armando Allen
- Chase Allen
- Duane Allen
- Eddie Allen
- Egypt Allen
- James Allen
- Jared Allen
- Keenan Allen
- Tremayne Allen
- Bob Allman
- John Allred
- Jim Althoff
- Kiran Amegadjie
- Adrian Amos
- Marty Amsler
- Prince Amukamara
- Abdullah Anderson
- Art Anderson
- Billy Anderson
- Brad Anderson
- Bryan Anderson
- Hunk Anderson
- James Anderson
- Jonathan Anderson
- Joseph Anderson (American football)
- Ken Anderson
- Marcus Anderson
- Mark Anderson
- Neal Anderson
- Ralph Anderson
- Tom Andrews
- Blake Annen
- Lionel Antoine
- Chuck Apolskis
- Adam Archuleta
- Tony Ardizzone
- Trace Armstrong
- Jon Arnett
- Devin Aromashodu
- John Arp
- Lee Artoe
- Bob Asher
- Johan Asiata
- Doug Atkins
- Kelvin Atkins
- Jeremiah Attaochu
- Ray Austin
- Reggie Austin
- Billy Autrey
- Darnell Autry
- Troy Auzenne
- Bob Avellini
- John Aveni
- Brendon Ayanbadejo
- Jerry Azumah

== B ==
- Al Babartsky
- John Babinecz
- John Badaczewski
- Michael Badgley
- Tyson Bagent
- Johnny Bailey
- Al Baisi
- Myron Baker
- Alan Ball
- Fred Banks
- Johnthan Banks
- Marion Barber III
- Dick Barker
- Matt Barkley
- Erich Barnes
- Gary Barnes
- Joe Barnes
- Lew Barnes
- Marlon Barnes
- Steve Barnett
- Tommy Barnhardt
- Lamin Barrow
- Alex Bars
- Connor Barth
- Brent Bartholomew
- Kirk Barton
- Dick Barwegen
- Brian Baschnagel
- Micah Baskerville
- David Bass
- Robert Bass
- Dick Bassi
- D'Wayne Bates
- Ryan Bates
- Alf Bauman
- De'Vante Bausby
- Frank Bausch
- Fred Baxter
- Craig Baynham
- Dave Becker
- Doug Becker
- Kurt Becker
- Wayland Becker
- Nick Becton
- Josh Beekman
- Bobby Bell
- Joique Bell
- Kahlil Bell
- Kay Bell
- Ricky Bell
- Todd Bell
- Josh Bellamy
- Theo Benedet
- Ryan Benjamin
- Earl Bennett
- Edgar Bennett
- Martellus Bennett
- Cedric Benson
- Jim Benton
- Gil Bergerson
- Eddie Berlin
- Bernard Berrian
- Connie Mack Berry
- Royce Berry
- Art Best
- Tom Bettis
- John Bettridge
- Andrew Billings
- Don Bingham
- Bill Bishop
- Don Bishop
- Charlie Bivins
- Del Bjork
- Todd Black
- Hugh Blacklock
- Stub Blackman
- Angelo Blackson
- Josh Blackwell
- Kelly Blackwell
- Paul Blair
- Jeff Blake
- George Blanda
- Khari Blasingame
- Anthony Blaylock
- Lynn Boden
- Taylor Boggs
- George Bolan
- Devante Bond
- Bourbon Bondurant
- Chris Boniol
- Austin Booker
- Marty Booker
- Alfonso Boone
- J. R. Boone
- Breon Borders
- Larry Borom
- Mark Bortz
- Cap Boso
- Jon Bostic
- Sam Bowers
- Zack Bowman
- Fabien Bownes
- Tim Boyle
- M. L. Brackett
- Chuck Bradley
- Ed Bradley
- Mark Bradley
- Steve Bradley
- Zeke Bratkowski
- Ben Braunecker
- Daniel Braverman
- Ray Bray
- Tyler Bray
- Chris Brewer
- Doug Brien
- Greg Briggs
- Lance Briggs
- Larry Brink
- Jaquan Brisker
- Earl Britton
- Eben Britton
- Blake Brockermeyer
- Macey Brooks
- Alex Brown
- Andrew Brown
- Bill Brown
- Brittain Brown
- Charlie Brown
- Daniel Brown
- Ed Brown
- James Brown
- Kevin Brown
- Mike Brown
- Ruben Brown
- Carl Brumbaugh
- Ross Brupbacher
- Johnny Bryan
- Waymond Bryant
- Bill Buckler
- Dan Buenning
- Doug Buffone
- Maury Buford
- Ray Buivid
- Rudy Bukich
- Ronnie Bull
- Jonathan Bullard
- Josh Bullocks
- Luther Burden III
- Lloyd Burdick
- Glen Burgeis
- Todd Burger
- Randall Burks
- George Burman
- Max Burnell
- Artie Burns
- Keith Burns
- Henry Burris
- James Burton
- Michael Burton
- Shane Burton
- Trey Burton
- Deon Bush
- Michael Bush
- Jermon Bushrod
- Art Buss
- Young Bussey
- Dick Butkus
- Gary Butler
- Kevin Butler
- Rich Buzin
- Kevin Byard
- Damiere Byrd

== C ==
- Brian Cabral
- Jim Cadile
- Lee Roy Caffey
- Jeremy Cain
- Joe Cain
- Mike Caldwell
- Bryce Callahan
- Lee Calland
- Jack Cameron
- Al Campana
- Gary Campbell
- Jason Campbell
- Leon Campbell
- Jim Canady
- Bob Carey
- Ka'Deem Carey
- Gabe Carimi
- Harland Carl
- Roy Carlson
- Stephen Carlson
- Zuck Carlson
- J. C. Caroline
- Mark Carrier
- Daryl Carter
- DeAndre Carter
- Ja'Tyre Carter
- Marty Carter
- Tom Carter
- Tony Carter
- Virgil Carter
- Rick Casares
- Tim Casey
- Kerry Cash
- Jesse Castete
- Sean Cattouse
- Marq Cerqua
- Guy Chamberlin
- Wally Chambers
- Robert Chancey
- Chris Chandler
- Dick Chapura
- Taco Charlton
- Al Chesley
- Chester A. Chesney
- Clarence Childs
- Bob Christian
- Marqui Christian
- Ed Cifers
- Darryl Clark
- Desmond Clark
- Gail Clark
- Greg Clark
- Herman Clark
- Jon Clark
- Phil Clark
- Harry Clarke
- Stu Clarkson
- Jimmy Clausen
- Chase Claypool
- Craig Clemons
- Ha Ha Clinton-Dix
- Tyler Clutts
- Rich Coady
- Mike Cobb
- Trevor Cobb
- Ed Cody
- Landon Cohen
- Tarik Cohen
- Angelo Coia
- Adrian Colbert
- Dylan Cole
- Emerson Cole
- Linzy Cole
- Travis Coleman
- James Coley
- Andre Collins
- Aviante Collins
- Nate Collins
- Todd Collins
- Marc Colombo
- Rosevelt Colvin
- Tom Compton
- Jack Concannon
- Red Conkright
- George Connor
- Chris Conte
- Curtis Conway
- Jimmy Conzelman
- Marv Cook
- Ed Cooke
- Marcus Cooper
- Ron Copeland
- George Corbett
- Frank Cornish Jr.
- Blake Costanzo
- Craig Cotton
- Isaiah Coulter
- Terry Cousin
- Jim Covert
- Les Cowan
- Rashaad Coward
- Byron Cowart
- Bryan Cox
- Ron Cox
- Fred Crawford
- Mush Crawford
- Xavier Crawford
- Abe Croft
- Don Croftcheck
- Bobby Cross
- Dane Cruikshank
- Brad Culpepper
- Al Culver
- Benny Cunningham
- Cookie Cunningham
- Jeff Curchin
- Jake Curhan
- Airese Currie
- Jay Cutler

== D ==
- Ted Daffer
- Drew Dalman
- Andy Dalton
- Scott Daly
- John Damore
- Chase Daniel
- Jim Daniell
- Dick Daniels
- James Daniels
- Phillip Daniels
- Buddy Davis
- Butch Davis
- Chauncey Davis
- Fred Davis
- Harper Davis
- Jason Davis
- John Davis
- Kellen Davis
- Mike Davis
- Nate Davis
- Rashied Davis
- Rob Davis
- Roger Davis
- Russell Davis
- Wendell Davis
- Brian de la Puente
- Fred Dean
- Dom DeCicco
- Bill DeCorrevont
- Steve DeLong
- Jack Deloplaine
- Quintin Demps
- Frank Dempsey
- Austin Denney
- Autry Denson
- Richard Dent
- Andrew DePaola
- Chris Devlin
- Willard Dewveall
- Gervon Dexter
- Bernie Digris
- Babe Dimancheff
- Mike Ditka
- Ahmad Dixon
- Al Dodd
- John Doehring
- Jerry Doerger
- Kevin Dogins
- Tom Donchez
- Jim Dooley
- Kayo Dottley
- Merrill Douglas
- Bobby Douglass
- Maurice Douglass
- Earl Douthitt
- Corey Dowden
- Chris Draft
- Scott Dragos
- Shaun Draughn
- Ferd Dreher
- Chuck Dressen
- Ted Drews
- Wally Dreyer
- Paddy Driscoll
- Chuck Drulis
- Hoot Drury
- Ron Drzewiecki
- George Duarte
- Vladimir Ducasse
- Dave Duerson
- Jack Dugger
- Mike Dulaney
- Bob Dunlap
- Brandon Dunn
- Pat Dunsmore
- Devin Duvernay
- Dusty Dvoracek
- Chris Dyko

== E ==
- Robin Earl
- Trestan Ebner
- Ed Ecker
- Paul Edinger
- Cornelius Edison
- Tremaine Edmunds
- Bud Edwards
- Cid Edwards
- Lavar Edwards
- Marc Edwards
- Mario Edwards Jr.
- Steve Edwards
- T. J. Edwards
- Pat Eilers
- Dieter Eiselen
- Jamin Elliott
- Allan Ellis
- Shorty Elness
- Harold Ely
- Larry Ely
- Paul Engebretsen
- Harry Englund
- Bobby Engram
- Curtis Enis
- Tory Epps
- Darrynton Evans
- Earl Evans
- Fred Evans
- Vince Evans
- Gerald Everett
- Tyler Everett
- Dick Evey

== F ==
- Tayo Fabuluje
- Rob Fada
- Richard Fain
- David Fales
- Gary Famiglietti
- Stan Fanning
- George Farmer
- Bo Farrington
- Tom Farris
- Beattie Feathers
- John Federovitch
- Jay Feely
- Dan Feeney
- Andy Feichtinger
- Gary Fencik
- Bob Fenimore
- Ego Ferguson
- Jim Ferguson
- Gus Fetz
- Tony Fiammetta
- Justin Fields
- George Figner
- Dave Finzer
- Bob Fisher
- Jeff Fisher
- Kylie Fitts
- Greg Fitzgerald
- Pat Flaherty
- Dick Flanagan
- Latham Flanagan
- Jim Flanigan
- Bill Fleckenstein
- Dallis Flowers
- Bobby Jack Floyd
- Leonard Floyd
- Doug Flutie
- Nick Foles
- Albert Fontenot
- Jerry Fontenot
- Marlon Forbes
- Carl Ford
- Charlie Ford
- Jonathan Ford
- Michael Ford
- Jim Fordham
- D'Onta Foreman
- Tom Forrest
- Brock Forsey
- Aldo Forte
- Matt Forte
- Dan Fortmann
- Joe Fortunato
- Sam Francis
- Jerry Franklin
- Paul Franklin
- Leslie Frazier
- Andy Frederick
- Jerrell Freeman
- Isaiah Frey
- Lennie Friedman
- Babe Frump
- Kyle Fuller
- Steve Fuller
- Will Furrer

== G ==
- Taylor Gabriel
- Thomas Gafford
- Justin Gage
- Dave Gagnon
- Michael Gaines
- Wentford Gaines
- Willie Galimore
- Dave Gallagher
- Hugh Gallarneau
- Mike Gandy
- Antonio Garay
- Gilbert Gardner
- C. J. Gardner-Johnson
- Chris Gardocki
- Carl Garrett
- Dub Garrett
- Thurman Garrett
- Art Garvey
- Roberto Garza
- Bruce Gaston
- DeMarquis Gates
- Josh Gattis
- Willie Gault
- Shaun Gayle
- Chris Gedney
- Curt Gentry
- Dennis Gentry
- Tanner Gentry
- Bill George
- Sid Gepford
- Carl Gersbach
- Bill Geyer
- Abe Gibron
- Aaron Gibson
- Thaddeus Gibson
- Jarron Gilbert
- Kline Gilbert
- Trenton Gill
- John Gilliam
- John Gilmore
- Ted Ginn Jr.
- Tashaun Gipson
- Trevis Gipson
- Chris Glaser
- Brian Glasgow
- Bill Glenn
- Jacoby Glenn
- Mike Glennon
- Larry Glueck
- Eddie Goldman
- Marquise Goodwin
- Dick Gordon
- Kyler Gordon
- Lou Gordon
- Ken Gorgal
- Robbie Gould
- Brian Gowins
- Jim Grabowski
- Corey Graham
- Jeff Graham
- Jimmy Graham
- Thomas Graham Jr.
- Ken Grandberry
- Garland Grange
- Red Grange
- Ernest Grant
- Jakeem Grant
- Larry Grant
- Paul Grasmanis
- Hroniss Grasu
- Bobby Gray
- Chris Gray
- Bobby Joe Green
- Gerri Green
- Jamaal Green
- Mark Green
- Mike Green
- Rasheem Green
- Robert Green
- Khaseem Greene
- Duke Greenich
- Brian Griese
- Ryan Griffin
- Bob Grim
- Rex Grossman
- George Grosvenor
- Ryan Groy
- Al Grygo
- Pete Gudauskas
- George Gulyanics
- Jimmy Gunn
- Harry Gunner

== H ==
- Al Hadden
- Kris Haines
- George Halas
- Dave Hale
- Deiondre' Hall
- Lemanski Hall
- Ty Hallock
- Jim Haluska
- Arlington Hambright
- Marcus Hamilton
- Gene Hamlin
- Henry Hammond
- Dan Hampton
- Harrison Hand
- Caleb Hanie
- Carl Hanke
- Frank Hanny
- Wayne Hansen
- Jim Harbaugh
- Cliff Hardy
- Daniel Hardy
- John Hardy
- Chic Harley
- Duron Harmon
- Ronnie Harmon
- LaSalle Harper
- Roland Harper
- Al Harris
- Chris Harris
- Chuck Harris
- Demetrius Harris
- Dwayne Harris
- Frank Harris
- Jonathan Harris
- Raymont Harris
- Richard Harris
- Sean Harris
- Tommie Harris
- Walt Harris
- Jim Harrison
- Marcus Harrison
- N'Keal Harry
- Tommy Hart
- Mike Hartenstine
- Fred Hartman
- Perry Hartnett
- Mark Hartsell
- Clint Haslerig
- Mike Hass
- Johnny Hatley
- Garland Hawkins
- Kelvin Hayden
- Geno Hayes
- Michael Haynes
- Major Hazelton
- Ed Healey
- Don Healy
- Tom Hearden
- Andy Heck
- Charles Heileman
- Lakei Heimuli
- John Helwig
- Bill Hempel
- Reuben Henderson
- Ricky Henry
- Dick Hensley
- Khalil Herbert
- Jimmy Herndon
- Bruce Herron
- Devin Hester
- Jim Hester
- Bill Hewitt
- Craig Heyward
- Jesse Hibbs
- Akiem Hicks
- Elijah Hicks
- Michael Hicks
- Tom Hicks
- Lenny High
- Van Hiles
- Jay Hilgenberg
- Harlon Hill
- Ike Hill
- Hunter Hillenmeyer
- Randy Hilliard
- Mike Hintz
- Mike Hoban
- Norm Hodgins
- Jack Hoffman
- John Hoffman (born 1925)
- John Hoffman (born 1943)
- Merril Hoge
- Mike Hohensee
- Jon Hoke
- Warrick Holdman
- Glen Holloway
- Daven Holly
- Willie Holman
- Walt Holmer
- Jalyn Holmes
- Jaret Holmes
- Santonio Holmes
- Mike Holovak
- J. P. Holtz
- Travis Homer
- Ziggy Hood
- Al Hoptowit
- Mike Horan
- Jesper Horsted
- Larry Horton
- Rob Housler
- Lamarr Houston
- DeAndre Houston-Carson
- Bobbie Howard
- Dana Howard
- Jordan Howard
- Chuck Howley
- Brian Hoyer
- Gary Hrivnak
- John Huarte
- Chris Hudson
- Carlos Huerta
- Gary Huff
- Ken Huffine
- Harry Hugasian
- Bill Hughes
- Tyrone Hughes
- Mike Hull
- Don Hultz
- Stefan Humphries
- Chuck Hunsinger
- Jackie Hunt
- Margus Hunt
- Greg Huntington
- Sam Hurd
- Demontre Hurst
- Chad Hutchinson
- Anthony Hutchison
- Bruce Huther
- Steve Hyche
- Bob Hyland
- Ruben Hyppolite II

== I ==
- Israel Idonije
- Germain Ifedi
- Juaquin Iglesias
- Burt Ingwersen
- Dontrelle Inman
- Tony Ippolito
- Darwin Ireland
- Bruce Irvin
- Isaiah Irving
- John Ivlow
- Brian Iwuh
- Joel Iyiegbuniwe

== J ==
- Bobby Jackson
- D'Marco Jackson
- Eddie Jackson
- Jack Jackson
- John Jackson
- Jonah Jackson
- Lamar Jackson
- Leonard Jackson
- Noah Jackson
- Randy Jackson
- Vestee Jackson
- Jeff Jaeger
- Chick Jagade
- Dan James
- Jesse James
- John Janata
- Ernie Janet
- Mike January
- Mike Jarmoluk
- Grady Jarrett
- Ralph Jecha
- Alshon Jeffery
- Eric Jeffries
- Bob Jencks
- Corey Jenkins
- Jarvis Jenkins
- John Jenkins
- Teven Jenkins
- Keith Jennings
- Tim Jennings
- Leo Jensvold
- Bob Jeter
- Perry Jeter
- Bob Jewett
- Dan Jiggetts
- Ade Jimoh
- Leon Joe
- Herb Joesting
- Anthony Johnson
- Bert Johnson
- Bill Johnson
- Brent Johnson
- Bryan Johnson
- Caleb Johnson
- Collin Johnson
- Dirk Johnson
- Herbert Johnson
- Jack Johnson
- Jaylon Johnson
- John Johnson
- Keshon Johnson
- Leon Johnson
- Oscar Johnson
- Pete Johnson
- Quindell Johnson
- Robert Johnson
- Roschon Johnson
- Tank Johnson
- Todd Johnson
- Troy Johnson
- Will Johnson
- Luke Johnsos
- Kingsley Jonathan
- Bob Jones
- Braxton Jones
- Carl Jones
- Christian Jones
- Dante Jones
- Daryl Jones
- Edgar Jones
- Greg Jones
- Howard Jones
- Jaylon Jones
- Jermaine Jones
- Jerry Jones
- Jimmy Jones
- Justin Jones
- Kevin Jones
- Stan Jones
- Thomas Jones
- Velus Jones Jr.
- Harold Jones-Quartey
- Donald Jordan
- Dwayne Joseph
- Michael Joseph
- Eric Joyce
- Dave Juenger
- Cato June

== K ==
- Nikola Kalinic
- Ed Kallina
- Sam Kamara
- Khalid Kareem
- Bill Karr
- Ted Karras
- Alain Kashama
- Chuck Kassel
- Ken Kavanaugh
- Ed Kawal
- Jim Keane
- Jerry Keefe
- Elmo Kelly
- Jim Kelly
- Jim Kendrick
- Jimmy Kennedy
- Eddie Kennison
- Nick Kerasiotis
- BoPete Keyes
- Marcus Keyes
- Tyrone Keys
- Walt Kiesling
- Bob Kilcullen
- Jon Kilgore
- Don Kindt
- Don Kindt Jr.
- Ralph King
- Steve Kinney
- Ken Kirk
- Adolph Kissell
- Dick Klawitter
- A. J. Klein
- Dick Klein
- Cole Kmet
- Ken Knapczyk
- Bryan Knight
- Oscar Knop
- Bill Knox
- Johnny Knox
- Ronnie Knox
- Bob Koehler
- Ed Kolman
- Max Komar
- Joe Kopcha
- Ken Kortas
- Gary Kosins
- Glen Kozlowski
- Tanoh Kpassagnon
- Doug Kramer
- Erik Kramer
- John Kreamcheck
- Rich Kreitling
- Mitch Krenk
- Craig Krenzel
- Olin Kreutz
- Dave Krieg
- Doug Kriewald
- Todd Krumm
- Rudy Kuechenberg
- Lee Kunz
- Ralph Kurek
- Eric Kush
- Nick Kwiatkoski
