= Joe LaFleur =

American football player (1898–1943)

No. 2
- Positions: Guard, fullback, center, halfback

Personal information
- Born: March 29, 1898; Cornell, Michigan, U.S.
- Died: May 11, 1943 (aged 45); Escanaba, Michigan, U.S.
- Listed height: 6 ft 0 in (1.83 m)
- Listed weight: 223 lb (101 kg)

Career information
- College: St. Norbert; Marquette

Career history
- Chicago Bears (1922–1924)

Career NFL statistics
- Games started: 27
- Games played: 12
- Stats at Pro Football Reference

Harry Joseph LaFleur (March 29, 1898 – May 11, 1943) was an American football guard, fullback, center, and halfback for the Chicago Bears of the National Football League (NFL). He played at the collegiate level at Marquette University and St. Norbert College.

== Biography ==
LaFleur was born on March 29, 1898, in Cornell, Michigan, and died on May 11, 1943, in Escanaba, Michigan. He was 45 years old.

== See also ==
- List of Chicago Bears players
