= Cornell, Michigan =

- Unincorporated community
- Location within the state of Michigan
- Coordinates: 45°54′05″N 87°13′20″W
- Country: United States
- State: Michigan
- County: Delta
- Township: Cornell
- Elevation: 823 ft (251 m)
- Time zone: UTC-5 (Eastern (EST))
  - Summer (DST): UTC-4 (EDT)
- ZIP code(s): 49818
- Area code: 906
- GNIS feature ID: 623841

Cornell is an unincorporated community in Delta County, Michigan, United States. Cornell is located in Cornell Township 10.5 miles (16.9 km) west-northwest of Gladstone. Cornell has a post office with ZIP code 49818.

== History ==
Cornell was initially settled in 1886 by Marcell Ashland and Edward Hollywood. It was founded in 1887 by George H. Mashek and Edward Arnold; Mashek named the community after his alma mater, Cornell University. A post office opened in Cornell on April 12, 1899; Edward Arnold was the first postmaster.

== Climate ==
This climatic region is typified by large seasonal temperature differences, with warm to hot (and often humid) summers and cold (sometimes severely cold) winters. According to the Köppen Climate Classification system, Cornell has a humid continental climate, abbreviated "Dfb" on climate maps.
