= Chicago Bears all-time roster =

The Chicago Bears all-time roster is split by name into the following two lists:

- Chicago Bears all-time roster (A–K)
- Chicago Bears all-time roster (L–Z)
