= Don Kindt =

American football player (1925–2000)

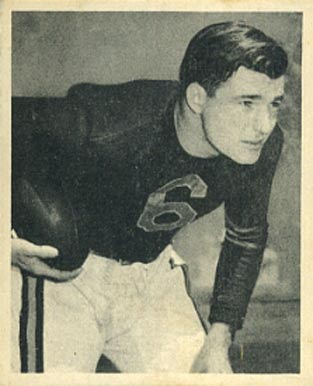
- Don Kindt 1948 Bowman football card

No. 6
- Positions: Defensive back, fullback, halfback

Personal information
- Born: July 2, 1925; Milwaukee, Wisconsin, U.S.
- Died: May 5, 2000 (aged 74); Brookfield, Wisconsin, U.S.
- Listed height: 6 ft 1 in (1.85 m)
- Listed weight: 207 lb (94 kg)

Career information
- High school: Washington (Milwaukee)
- College: Wisconsin (1943, 1945-1946)
- NFL draft: 1947: 1st round, 11th overall pick

Career history
- Chicago Bears (1947–1955)

Awards and highlights
- Pro Bowl (1953)

Career NFL statistics
- Rushing yards: 586
- Rushing average: 3.4
- Receptions: 43
- Receiving yards: 506
- Total touchdowns: 7
- Stats at Pro Football Reference

Donald John Kindt, Sr. (July 2, 1925 – May 5, 2000) was an American defensive back and halfback who played nine seasons from 1947 to 1955 for the Chicago Bears in the National Football League (NFL). Kindt played college football for the University of Wisconsin Badgers primarily as a halfback from 1943 to 1946, missing the 1944 and half of the 1945 season because of World War II. He was the starting halfback for the Badgers for most of his college career.

Kindt decided to forgo his senior season at Wisconsin in order to be eligible for the 1947 NFL draft. He was selected with the last pick of the first round (11th overall) by the Bears despite having an history with injuries, and recovering from an off-season knee surgery he suffered while playing a basketball game at Wisconsin. After playing dual positions in his first few seasons with the Bears, Kindt was used primarily on defense for his last six seasons in the league. Considered to be a defensive standout during his playing career, Kindt was selected to participate in one Pro Bowl, and led the team in interceptions several times.

His son Don Kindt, Jr. also played in the National Football League, as a tight end for the Bears during the 1987 season.

== Early career ==
Kindt was born in Milwaukee, Wisconsin. He played football for Washington High School in Milwaukee where he named to the All-City squad. He also played guard for Washington's high school basketball team.

=== 1943 season ===
After graduating from high school, Kindt received a scholarship to the University of Wisconsin. He became the starter at right halfback in his first year, while fellow freshman Clarence Self started at left halfback. In the season opener against Camp Grant, Kindt scored his first career touchdown on a six-yard run in the fourth quarter, which tied the game 7–7. Wisconsin went on to lose the game 10–7 after Camp Grant scored a field goal with five seconds left. In his third game, Kindt became a "hero of the game" for his playing tactics against the Iowa Hawkeyes. He scored the only touchdown of the game, a two-yard run, and managed to force the Hawkeyes to score a safety with time expiring when he did a quarterback kneel, and purposely fell down in the end zone, getting an Iowa defender to touch him for the safety. It prevented the Hawkeyes from potentially scoring a game-winning score as the Badgers won the game 7–5. Wisconsin temporarily managed to be in first place in the Big Ten conference play standings, though it was the lone highlight of the season for the Badgers, as they lost all their remaining games, mostly by blowouts and finished with a 1–9 record.

After his first three games Kindt was impressing Wisconsin's coaches with his "ball carrying and defensive abilities", while scoring two of Wisconsin's three touchdowns so far for the season. In the next game against the University of Illinois, head coach Harry Stuhldreher named Kindt as the captain of the team. He missed the next two games due to a leg infection suffered prior to a game against the University of Notre Dame. He returned for the homecoming game against Northwestern University, where he played a "couple of minutes" as he was still recovering from his injury. He came back to full form against the University of Michigan. Overall, Kindt scored four of Wisconsin's six touchdowns of the season.

=== World War II and 1945 season ===
Kindt was drafted into the United States Army in 1943 while at Wisconsin, in the midst of World War II. He reported to active duty on February 1, 1944, receiving basic training at Fort Wolters, Texas. After training, Kindt was assigned to the Army's 10th Mountain Division. He missed the 1944 season and half of the 1945 season while participating in the Italian Campaign. He was rewarded with two Bronze Stars, and a Victory Medal for his actions in Italy. Kindt returned to play for the Badgers in October 1945. In his return, Kindt shared the halfback position with Ben Bendrick, and Jerry Thompson. Kindt only managed to play three games that season, mainly because of a late release he received while returning from the Army. When Kindt returned to the squad, one journalist took it as far as hailing Kindt's return as a "godsend" who inspired the Badgers with his "inspirational play". He scored two touchdowns against Iowa upon his return. In the season finale on November 24 against the Minnesota Golden Gophers, Kindt scored three touchdowns despite being used as a "blocking back" in a 26–12 win. The Badgers finished the season with a 3–4–2 record.

=== 1946 season ===
Prior to the 1946 season, Kindt was involved in a skiing accident when he fell down a flight of stairs, hurting his leg. He regained his job as the primary starter at the halfback position in time for the season opener. Kindt battled injuries with his ankle, leg and thigh throughout the season, which hampered his play at times. He rushed for 42 yards on 14 carries and one touchdown in a 20–7 upset over 14th ranked Ohio State Buckeyes on October 13, the first time Wisconsin beat Ohio State in football since 1942. The next game, a 27–21 loss against the University of Illinois, Kindt suffered a left knee injury after getting "kicked in the shins" during the fourth quarter and left the game, not playing on a regular basis afterwards. He rushed only for 21 yards on five carries in a 21–7 loss against Iowa on November 9. After the season, Kindt injured his right knee while playing a game of intramural basketball, requiring surgery at a time in which knee surgery wasn't as technologically advanced as today.

During his career in Wisconsin, Kindt was considered to be the team's best all-around player, a person who could run, throw, and kick efficiently, as well as playing defense. He also punted and played safety for Wisconsin. Kindt was named to the Wisconsin Athletic Hall of Fame in 1988 and the University of Wisconsin Athletic Hall of Fame in 1997.

== NFL career ==
Kindt forfeited his last year of eligibility at Wisconsin after the 1946 season to play in the National Football League. It was reported that the Chicago Bears had Kindt as its top player in their draft wish list. By the time the 1947 NFL draft was held, the Bears managed to get Kindt with the eleventh overall pick. He soon signed a three-year contract at a reported $25,000 to play for head coach George Halas. After starting in a dual offensive/defensive role, Kindt decided to focus on playing only as a defensive back for the last few seasons of his career.

During his rookie season, Kindt joined a backfield which contained quarterback Sid Luckman and George McAfee, the primary starter at halfback. That season Kindt rushed for 266 yards and two touchdowns on 61 carries. One of his touchdowns was a meaningless three-yard run while the game was out of reach, a 49–7 blowout against the Chicago Cardinals on November 23. The next season Kindt rushed for 189 yards on 54 carries and two touchdowns, as the Bears acquired former Heisman Trophy winner Johnny Lujack and Bobby Layne to join Kindt, Luckman and McAfee in the backfield. A highlight of the season happened against the Detroit Lions on October 17 when he had a 66-yard run for a touchdown in a 28–0 Bears victory. After running for 118 yards on 41 carries, an average of 2.9 yards per carry during the 1949 season, Kindt contributions to the offense were limited despite Layne getting traded to the New York Yanks, Lujack being injured and both McAfee and Luckman retiring. In his final six seasons, he only carried the ball 16 times for 13 yards and no touchdowns.

Kindt was a starter at defensive back for most of his career. An outspoken player, Kindt was the defensive captain of the team by 1952. He was not afraid to criticize head coach George Halas on some of his coaching decisions, at times having to get separated from each other. One notable incident was during a 1952 loss against the Dallas Texans which Halas decided to start his second sting unit because the Texans were winless prior to the game. Kindt and Halas had to be separated after the final play of the game because Kindt "laughed" at something to his teammates after the Texans won and Halas ran across the field and kicked him. He later blamed Halas for the loss stating "poor defensive strategy". They had a similar incident during a game against the Green Bay Packers after Kindt miscalculated a play which led to touchdown and Halas kicked him in his knees. Kindt later claimed that Halas apologized for the incidents. He was selected to the 1954 Pro Bowl as a member of the West team, during which he scored a safety after tackling Cleveland Browns quarterback Otto Graham during the second quarter.

In his career, Kindt appeared in 108 games with the Bears, intercepting 21 passes with 10 forced fumbles and one defensive touchdown. As a running back, Kindt had 172 carries for 586 yards and four touchdowns while as a receiver, he had 43 receptions for 506 yards and two touchdowns.

== Later life ==
Kindt retired from football after the 1955 season to focus on a coaching career. In 1956, Curly Lambeau named Kindt as one of the assistant coaches for his College All-Stars squad, alongside future Hall of Famers Tony Canadeo, and Mike Michalske to play against the Cleveland Browns in an exhibition game. Again he was named as a coach for the College All-Stars in 1957. Kindt was the person in charge of the University of Wisconsin alumni varsity football game in 1958. He was married for over 50 years, and had three children, one of whom, Don Kindt, Jr. also played for the Chicago Bears in 1987. After his brief coaching stint ended, Kindt became a salesperson for the Badger Meter Company in Milwaukee, retiring in 1988. Kindt also dabbled with an acting career, appearing in amateur plays in his hometown.
