= 1977 All-Big Ten Conference football team =

American college football all-star team

The 1977 All-Big Ten Conference football team consists of American football players chosen by various organizations for All-Big Ten Conference teams for the 1977 Big Ten Conference football season. Conference co-champions Ohio State and Michigan led with eight and six first-team selections, respectively. Ohio State's first-team selections included running back Ron Springs and linebacker Tom Cousineau. Michigan's first-team selections included quarterback Rick Leach and offensive guard Mark Donahue.

== Offensive selections ==
=== Quarterbacks ===
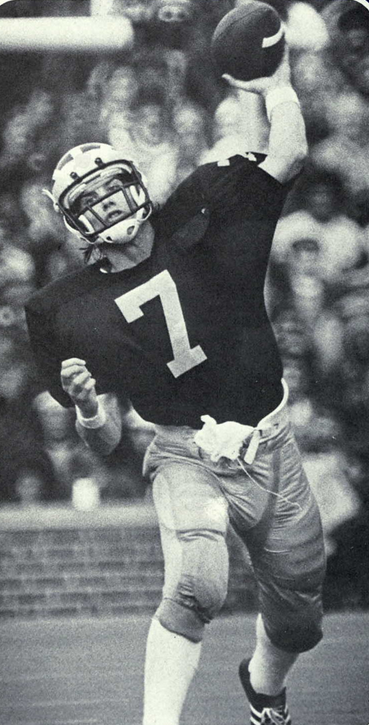
Quarterback Rick Leach

- Rick Leach, Michigan (AP-1; UPI-2)
- Rod Gerald, Ohio State (UPI-1)
- Mark Herrmann, Purdue (AP-2)

=== Running backs ===
- Ron Springs, Ohio State (AP-1; UPI-1)
- Ric Enis, Indiana (AP-1; UPI-1)
- Jeff Logan, Ohio State (UPI-1)
- Russell Davis, Michigan (AP-2; UPI-2)
- John Skibinski, Purdue (AP-2)
- Harlan Huckleby, Michigan (UPI-2)

=== Flankers ===
- Keith Calvin, Indiana (AP-1)
- David Charles, Wisconsin (AP-2)

=== Wide receivers ===
- Reggie Arnold, Purdue (AP-1; UPI-1)
- Jim Harrell, Ohio State (AP-2)
- Kirk Gibson, Michigan State (UPI-2)

=== Tight ends ===
- Jimmy Moore, Ohio State (AP-1; UPI-1)
- Gene Johnson, Michigan (AP-2)
- Mark Brammer, Michigan State (UPI-2)

=== Centers ===
- Walt Downing, Michigan (AP-1)
- Al Pitts, Michigan State (AP-2; UPI-1)
- Mark Slater, Minnesota (UPI-2)

=== Guards ===
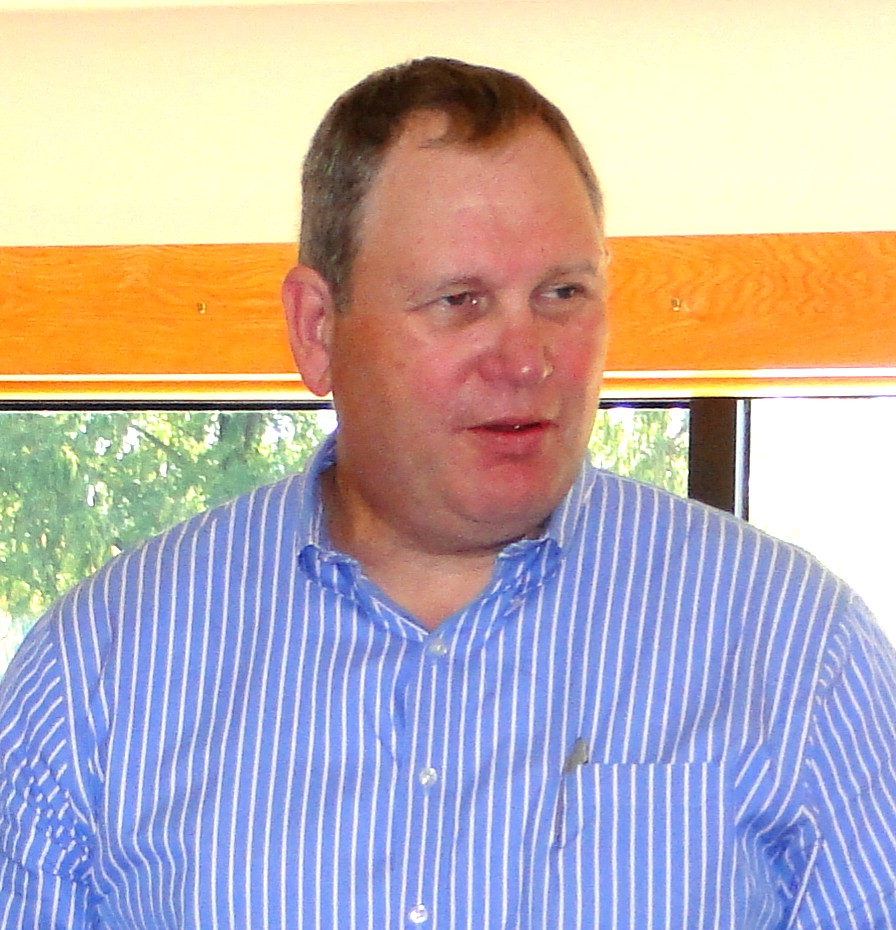
Guard Mark Donahue

- Mark Donahue, Michigan (AP-1; UPI-1)
- Kevin Pancratz, Illinois (AP-1; UPI-1)
- Frank Malec, Northwestern (AP-2; UPI-2)
- Gary Jurczyk, Illinois (AP-2)
- Mark Lang, Ohio State (UPI-2)

=== Tackles ===
- Chris Ward, Ohio State (AP-1; UPI-1)
- Mike Kenn, Michigan (AP-1; UPI-2)
- Charles Peal, Indiana (AP-2; UPI-1)
- Joe Robinson, Ohio State (AP-2)
- Tony Ardizzone, Northwestern (UPI-2)

== Defensive selections ==
=== Front five ===
- Larry Bethea, Michigan State (AP-1; UPI-1 [def. tackle])
- Aaron Brown, Ohio State (AP-1; UPI-1 [middle guard])
- Kelton Dansler, Ohio State (AP-1; UPI-1 [def. end])
- Steve Midboe, Minnesota (AP-1; UPI-1 [def. tackle])
- Dennis Stejskal, Wisconsin (AP-1; UPI-1 [def. end])
- John Anderson, Michigan (AP-2; UPI-1 [def. end])
- Paul Ross, Ohio State (AP-2; UPI-2 [def. end])
- John Harty, Iowa (AP-2)
- Tom Schremp, Wisconsin (AP-2)
- Mark Merrill, Minnesota (AP-2)
- Eddie Beamon, Ohio State (UPI-2 [def. tackle])
- Byron Cato, Ohio State (UPI-2 [def. tackle])
- Steve Graves, Michigan (UPI-2 [middle guard])

=== Linebackers ===
- Tom Cousineau, Ohio State (AP-1; UPI-1)
- Tom Rusk, Iowa (AP-1; UPI-1)
- John Sullivan, Illinois (AP-1)
- Ron Simpkins, Michigan (AP-2; UPI-1)
- Dom Tedesco, Michigan (AP-2)
- Paul Maly, Northwestern (AP-2)
- Paul Rudzinski, Michigan State (UPI-2)

=== Defensive backs ===
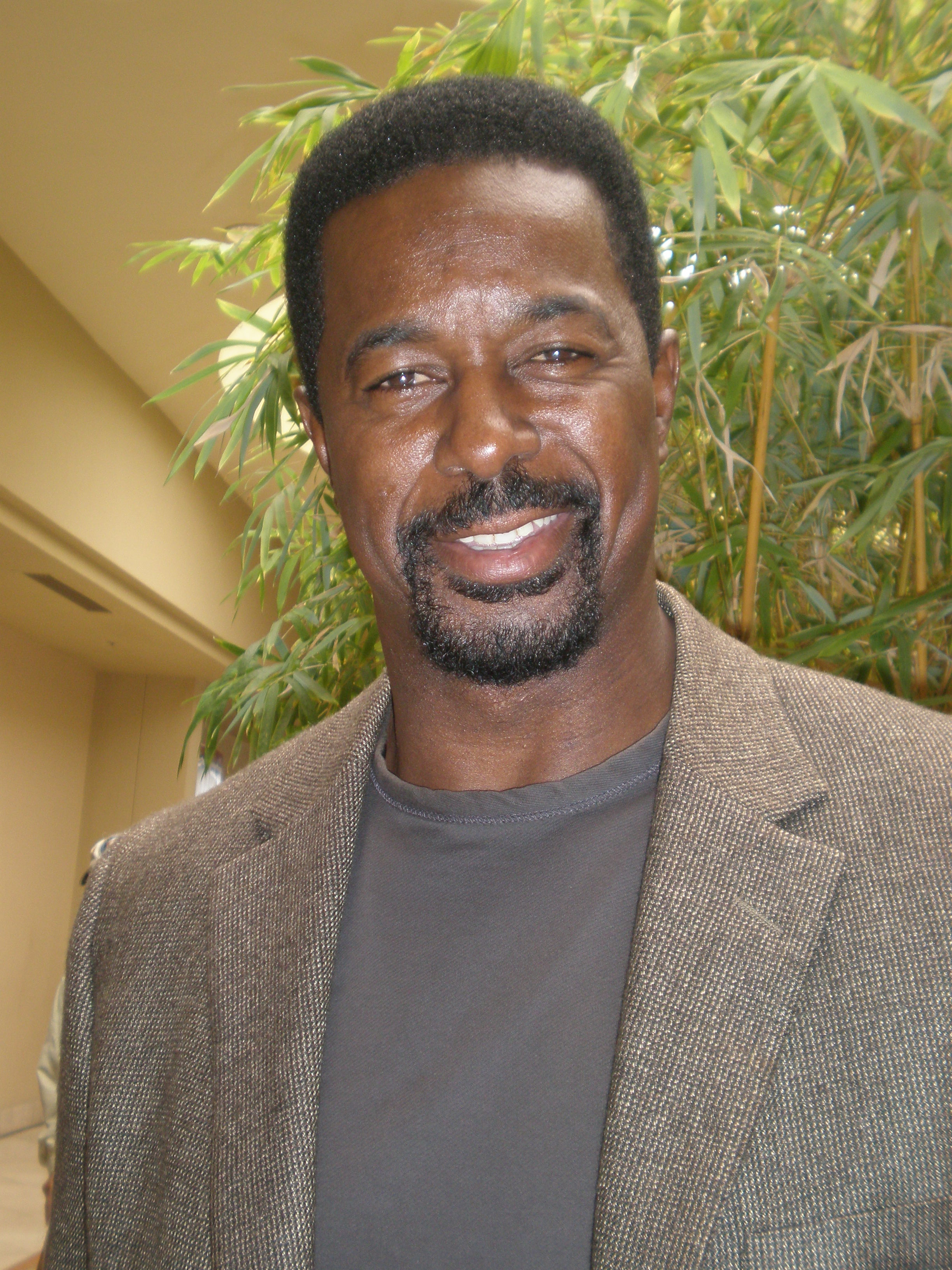
Defensive back Dwight Hicks

- Ray Griffin, Ohio State (AP-1; UPI-1)
- Mike Guess, Ohio State (AP-1; UPI-1)
- Dwight Hicks, Michigan (AP-1; UPI-1)
- Jim Pickens, Michigan (AP-2; UPI-1)
- Derek Howard, Michigan (UPI-2)
- Lawrence Johnson, Wisconsin (UPI-2)
- Mark Anderson, Michigan State (AP-2; UPI-2)
- Bobby Weber, Minnesota (AP-2)
- Dave Abrams, Indiana (UPI-2)

== Special teams ==
=== Placekicker ===
- Paul Rogind, Minnesota (AP-1)
- Hans Nielsen, Michigan State (UPI-1)
- Vlade Janakievski, Ohio State (AP-2)
- Keith Calvin, Indiana (UPI-2)

=== Punter ===
- Ray Stachowicz, Michigan State (AP-1; UPI-1)
- John Anderson, Michigan (AP-2; UPI-2)

== Key ==
AP = Associated Press, selected by a panel of 12 sports writers and broadcasters

UPI = United Press International, selected by the Big Ten coaches

Bold = Consensus first-team selection of both the AP and UPI

== See also ==
- 1977 College Football All-America Team
