= Paul Podmajersky =

American football player (1916–1993)

Profile
- Position: Guard

Personal information
- Born: November 17, 1916; Chicago, Illinois, U.S.
- Died: October 12, 1993 (age 76); Roseburg, Oregon, U.S.
- Listed height: 5 ft 11 in (1.80 m)
- Listed weight: 220 lb (100 kg)

Career information
- High school: Lane Tech (Chicago, Illinois)
- College: Michigan State University

Career history
- Chicago Bears (1944)
- Stats at Pro Football Reference

Paul E. Podmajersky Jr. (November 17, 1916 – October 12, 1993) was an American football player.

A native of Chicago, he played college football for Michigan State College (later known as Michigan State University), the University of Illinois, the University of Iowa, and the University of Wyoming. His wife later said that he transferred each year because "he kept getting better scholarship offers." He also played professional football in the National Football League as a guard for the Chicago Bears, appearing in one game during his rookie year of 1944.

In 1945, Bears coach George Halas wrote Podmajersky a check for $1,000 to help him attend medical school. He graduated from the University of Colorado Medical School in 1948 and practiced medicine in Chicago for more than 30 years. His patients included the Halas family. He later moved to Oregon where he died in 1993 at age 76.

== Personal life ==
Podmajersky was of Polish descent.
