= Stuart Rindy =

American football player (born 1964)

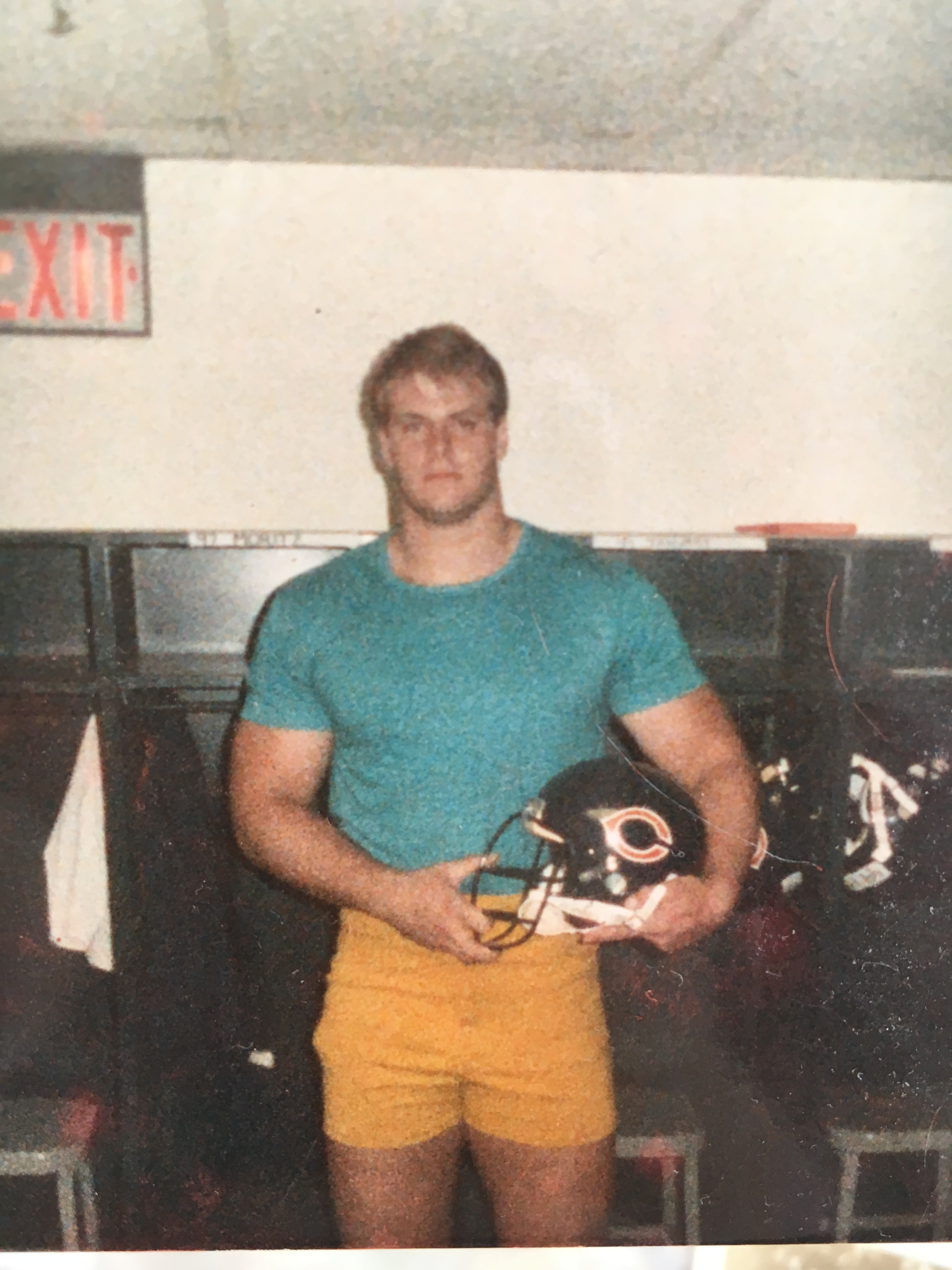
- Rindy in the 1980s

No. 69
- Position: Offensive tackle

Personal information
- Born: May 22, 1964 (age 62); Milwaukee, Wisconsin, U.S.
- Listed height: 6 ft 5 in (1.96 m)
- Listed weight: 266 lb (121 kg)

Career information
- High school: Waunakee
- College: Wisconsin–Whitewater
- NFL draft: 1986: undrafted

Career history
- Dallas Cowboys (1986)*; Chicago Bears (1987)
- * Offseason or practice squad member only

Career NFL statistics
- Games played: 2
- Stats at Pro Football Reference

Stuart Rindy (born May 22, 1964) is a former player in the National Football League (NFL) for the Chicago Bears in 1987 as a tackle.

Rindy was born Stuart Eugene, in Milwaukee, Wisconsin.

== See also ==
- List of Chicago Bears players
