= Hub Shoemake =

American football player (1899–1984)

No. 99
- Position: Guard

Personal information
- Born: September 29, 1899; Oskaloosa, Iowa, U.S.
- Died: March 10, 1984 (aged 84); Washington, D.C., U.S.
- Listed height: 6 ft 0 in (1.83 m)
- Listed weight: 186 lb (84 kg)

Career information
- College: Lake Front, Illinois, Bethany

Career history
- Decatur Staleys (1920)

Career statistics
- Games played: 6
- Games started: 4
- Stats at Pro Football Reference

Charles Hubbard Shoemake (September 29, 1899 – March 10, 1984) was an American professional football player who played one season for the Decatur Staleys of the National Football League (NFL). He played college football at three colleges, Lake Forest College, University of Illinois, and Bethany College.
