= Tony Ardizzone (American football) =

American football player (born 1956)

No. 63
- Position: Center

Personal information
- Born: December 19, 1956 (age 69); La Grange, Illinois, U.S.
- Listed height: 6 ft 3 in (1.91 m)
- Listed weight: 240 lb (109 kg)

Career information
- High school: St. Joseph (Westchester, Illinois)
- College: Northwestern
- NFL draft: 1978: 6th round, 153rd overall pick

Career history
- Detroit Lions (1978)*; San Francisco 49ers (1978); Chicago Bears (1979)
- * Offseason or practice squad member only

Awards and highlights
- Second-team All-Big Ten (1977)
- Stats at Pro Football Reference

Anthony Allen Ardizzone (born December 19, 1956) is an American former professional football player who was an offensive lineman for the Chicago Bears of the National Football League (NFL). He played college football for the Northwestern Wildcats.

== College career ==
Ardizzone attended and played college football at the Northwestern University from 1974 to 1977.

== Professional career ==
Ardizzone was selected in the sixth round (#153 overall) of the 1978 NFL draft by the Detroit Lions. He played all 16 games with the Chicago Bears in 1979.

== Personal life ==
On April 1, 2007; Ardizzone began a CertaPro Franchise in Glenview, Illinois. The Franchise, CertaPro Painters of the North Shore, has been accredited by the Better Business Bureau since September 2009. The franchise is still owned by Ardizzone as of March 2023, marking 15 years in the painting business.
