= Randy Young (end) =

American football player (1898–1975)

No. 16
- Position: End

Personal information
- Born: June 12, 1898; Salina, Kansas, U.S.
- Died: October 26, 1975 (aged 77)
- Listed height: 6 ft 0 in (1.83 m)
- Listed weight: 175 lb (79 kg)

Career information
- College: Millikin

Career history
- Decatur Staleys (1920)

Career statistics
- Games played: 1
- Stats at Pro Football Reference

Randolph Young (June 12, 1898 – October 26, 1975) was an American professional football end who played for one season for the Decatur Staleys of the American Professional Football Association (APFA). He played college football at Millikin University.
