= Hans Nielsen (American football) =

Danish gridiron football player (born 1952)

No. 6
- Position: Kicker

Personal information
- Born: November 18, 1952 (age 73); Vejle, Denmark
- Listed height: 5 ft 11 in (1.80 m)
- Listed weight: 165 lb (75 kg)

Career information
- High school: Manistee (Manistee, Michigan, U.S.)
- College: Michigan State
- NFL draft: 1978: undrafted

Career history
- Atlanta Falcons (1978)*; Philadelphia Eagles (1979)*; Chicago Bears (1981)
- * Offseason or practice squad member only

Awards and highlights
- First-team All-Big Ten (1977)

Career NFL statistics
- Field goals made: 0
- Field goal attempts: 2
- Extra points made: 8
- Extra points attempted: 8
- Stats at Pro Football Reference

Hans Jorgen Nielsen (born November 18, 1952) is a former American football kicker who played for the Chicago Bears in the National Football League (NFL). He played college football at Michigan State University.

== College career ==
Nielsen played college football at Michigan State from 1976 to 1977. In his collegiate career, he made 54-of-57 extra point attempts and 28-of-50 field goal attempts.

== Professional career ==
Nielsen's only season that he played was with the Chicago Bears in 1981. In week 5, his last career game against the Minnesota Vikings, he made all three extra-point attempts but missed a game-tying field goal resulting in a 21–24 loss. He was released after the miss, playing in 3 games with the team. Overall, he made 0-of-2 field goals and 8-of-8 extra-point attempts.

== Personal life ==
Since his football career ended, he now works in the pest control industry. He enjoys being outdoors, gardening, and many sports.
