= Cornell Township, Michigan =

- Civil township
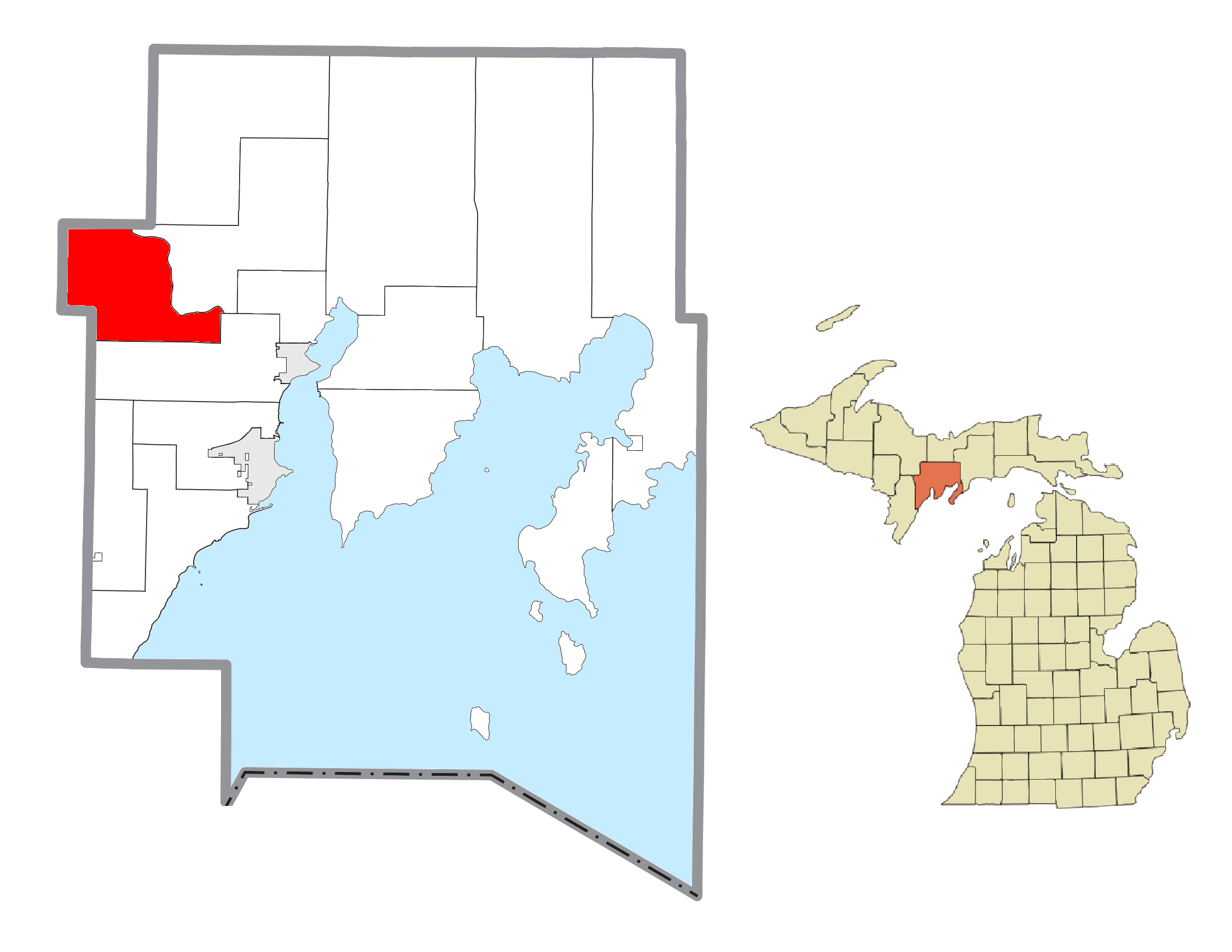
- Location within Delta County

- Location within the state of Michigan Cornell Township (the United States)
- Coordinates: 45°54′12″N 87°16′35″W
- Country: United States
- State: Michigan
- County: Delta

Government
  - Supervisor: Jerry J. Plourde

Area
  - Total: 60.2 sq mi (155.9 km^{2})
  - Land: 59.8 sq mi (154.8 km^{2})
  - Water: 0.42 sq mi (1.1 km^{2})
- Elevation: 873 ft (266 m)

Population (2020)
  - Total: 565
  - Density: 9.45/sq mi (3.65/km^{2})
- Time zone: UTC-5 (Eastern (EST))
  - Summer (DST): UTC-4 (EDT)
- ZIP code(s): 49818
- Area code: 906
- FIPS code: 26-18280
- GNIS feature ID: 1626133

Cornell Township is a civil township of Delta County in the U.S. state of Michigan. The population was 565 at the 2020 census, up from 593 at the 2010 census.

== Geography ==
According to the United States Census Bureau, the township has a total area of 60.2 square miles (156 km^{2}), of which 59.8 square miles (155 km^{2}) is land and 0.4 square miles (1.0 km^{2}) (0.71%) is water.

== Demographics ==
As of the census of 2000, there were 557 people, 217 households, and 172 families residing in the township. The population density was 9.3 inhabitants per square mile (3.6/km^{2}). There were 371 housing units at an average density of 6.2 per square mile (2.4/km^{2}). The racial makeup of the township was 98.56% White, 0.18% Native American, 0.36% Asian, and 0.90% from two or more races. Hispanic or Latino of any race were 1.44% of the population.

There were 217 households, out of which 26.7% had children under the age of 18 living with them, 72.8% were married couples living together, 3.2% had a female householder with no husband present, and 20.7% were non-families. 16.6% of all households were made up of individuals, and 3.2% had someone living alone who was 65 years of age or older. The average household size was 2.56 and the average family size was 2.88.

In the township the population was spread out, with 22.6% under the age of 18, 5.0% from 18 to 24, 26.6% from 25 to 44, 33.0% from 45 to 64, and 12.7% who were 65 years of age or older. The median age was 42 years. For every 100 females, there were 114.2 males. For every 100 females age 18 and over, there were 112.3 males.

The median income for a household in the township was $41,528, and the median income for a family was $43,214. Males had a median income of $35,313 versus $21,875 for females. The per capita income for the township was $18,334. About 6.8% of families and 5.9% of the population were below the poverty line, including 3.4% of those under age 18 and 5.4% of those age 65 or over.
