= Tommy Barnhardt =

American football player (born 1963)

No. 10, 17, 14, 6
- Position: Punter

Personal information
- Born: June 11, 1963 (age 63); Salisbury, North Carolina, U.S.
- Listed height: 6 ft 2 in (1.88 m)
- Listed weight: 207 lb (94 kg)

Career information
- High school: South Rowan (China Grove)
- College: North Carolina
- NFL draft: 1986: 9th round, 223rd overall pick

Career history
- Tampa Bay Buccaneers (1986–1987)*; New Orleans Saints (1987); Chicago Bears (1987); Washington Redskins (1988); Detroit Lions (1989)*; New Orleans Saints (1989–1994); Carolina Panthers (1995); Tampa Bay Buccaneers (1996–1998); New Orleans Saints (1999); Washington Redskins (2000)
- * Offseason or practice squad member only

Awards and highlights
- NFL punting yards leader (1991)

Career NFL statistics
- Punts: 890
- Punting yards: 37,469
- Punting average: 42.1
- Longest punt: 65
- Inside 20: 242
- Stats at Pro Football Reference

Thomas Ray Barnhardt (born June 11, 1963) is an American former professional football player who was a punter in the National Football League (NFL). He played college football for the North Carolina Tar Heels and was selected in the ninth round (223rd overall) of the 1986 NFL draft by the Tampa Bay Buccaneers.

== NFL career statistics ==
Legend
	Led the league
**Bold**	Career high

=== Regular season ===
Year	Team	Punting									
Year	Team	GP	Punts	Yds	Net Yds	Lng	Avg	Net Avg	Blk	Ins20	TB
1987	NOR	3	11	483	399	52	43.9	36.3	0	4	1
1987	CHI	2	6	236	200	50	39.3	33.3	0	2	0
1988	WAS	4	15	628	514	55	41.9	34.3	0	1	2
1989	NOR	11	55	2,179	1,925	56	39.6	35.0	0	17	4
1990	NOR	**16**	70	2,990	2,568	**71**	42.7	36.2	**1**	20	6
1991	NOR	**16**	86	3,743	3,073	61	43.5	35.3	**1**	20	10
1992	NOR	**16**	67	2,947	2,529	62	44.0	37.7	0	19	10
1993	NOR	**16**	77	3,356	2,888	58	43.6	37.5	0	26	6
1994	NOR	**16**	67	2,920	2,245	57	43.6	33.5	0	14	9
1995	CAR	**16**	**95**	**3,906**	**3,344**	54	41.1	35.2	0	**27**	**11**
1996	TAM	**16**	70	3,015	2,687	62	43.1	37.8	**1**	24	4
1997	TAM	6	29	1,304	1,134	61	**45.0**	**39.1**	0	12	3
1998	TAM	**16**	81	3,340	2,858	55	41.2	35.3	0	19	9
1999	NOR	**16**	82	3,262	2,879	52	39.8	35.1	0	14	5
2000	WAS	**16**	79	3,160	2,718	53	40.0	34.4	0	23	5
Career		186	890	37,469	31,961	65	42.1	35.8	3	242	85

=== Playoffs ===
Year	Team	Punting									
Year	Team	GP	Punts	Yds	Net Yds	Lng	Avg	Net Avg	Blk	Ins20	TB
1987	CHI	**1**	**4**	145	80	44	36.3	20.0	0	0	0
1990	NOR	**1**	3	90	77	38	30.0	25.7	0	0	0
1991	NOR	**1**	3	**162**	100	**56**	**54.0**	33.3	0	**2**	**2**
1992	NOR	**1**	3	136	**108**	48	45.3	**36.0**	0	0	1
Career		4	13	533	365	56	41.0	28.1	0	2	3
