= Henry Shank =

American football player (1892–1962)

No. 18
- Position: Halfback

Personal information
- Born: February 18, 1892; Chicago, Illinois, U.S.
- Died: March 19, 1962 (aged 70); Chicago, Illinois, U.S.
- Listed height: 5 ft 8 in (1.73 m)
- Listed weight: 160 lb (73 kg)

Career information
- College: Maryland

Career history
- Decatur Staleys (1920)

Career statistics
- Games played: 5
- Stats at Pro Football Reference

Henry Stanley Shank (February 18, 1892 – March 19, 1962) was an American professional football halfback who played a season for the Decatur Staleys of the American Professional Football Association (APFA). He played college football at the University of Maryland.
