= John Oelerich =

American football player (1916–1989)

- Oelerich, circa 1950

No. 7, 40
- Position: Halfback

Personal information
- Born: February 17, 1916; Davenport, Iowa, U.S.
- Died: February 9, 1989 (aged 72); Pensacola, Florida, U.S.
- Listed height: 6 ft 0 in (1.83 m)
- Listed weight: 192 lb (87 kg)

Career information
- High school: St. Ambrose Academy (Davenport)
- College: St. Ambrose (1934–1937)
- NFL draft: 1938: undrafted

Career history
- Chicago Bears (1938); East Chicago Indians (1938); Pittsburgh Pirates (1938)

Awards and highlights
- 2× First-team All-Iowa Conference (1936–1937)
- Stats at Pro Football Reference

John Herman Oelerich (February 17, 1916 – February 9, 1989) was an American professional football halfback who played in the National Football League (NFL) with the Chicago Bears and Pittsburgh Pirates. He played college football for the St. Ambrose Saints.

== Early life ==
John Herman Oelerich was born on February 17, 1916, in Davenport, Iowa. He attended St. Ambrose Academy in Davenport.

== College career ==
Oelerich played college football for the Saints of St. Ambrose College from 1934 to 1937. He was hampered by a back injury before the start of the 1936 season but was ready in time for the season opener. He was named first-team All-Iowa Conference at fullback in 1936 and first-team All-Iowa Conference at halfback in 1937. He was one of seven seniors who shared the team captaincy in 1937.

== Professional career ==
Oelerich went undrafted in the 1938 NFL draft. On May 24, 1938, it was reported that he had signed with the Chicago Bears. He played in two games for the Bears as a reserve halfback, rushing twice for two yards and completing one pass for ten yards before being released in October.

Oelerich joined the East Chicago Indians of the American Professional Football League on October 21 and played in one game for them as a backup halfback. He then played in three games, starting one, for the NFL's Pittsburgh Pirates during the 1938 season, totaling 12 carries for 21 yards and two receptions for 23 yards.

== Coaching career ==
In late 1939, Oelerich was named the new head football coach at his alma mater, St. Ambrose Academy. He missed three seasons while serving in the United States Navy during World War II. He was a lieutenant on a destroyer that took part in the Battles of Iwo Jima and Okinawa. Through the 1949 season, Oelerich had 50 wins and 15 losses as St. Ambrose's head coach. He was called back into the Navy during the middle of the 1950 season.

After his second stint in the Navy, Oelerich became the junior varsity football coach at Thomas Jefferson High School in Tampa, Florida, in 1954. He was later an administrator, head football coach, and track coach at Pensacola High School before retiring in 1979. He died of cancer on February 9, 1989, in Pensacola.
