= John Federovitch =

American football player (1917–2003)

No. 34
- Position: Tackle

Personal information
- Born: June 26, 1917; Wyano, Pennsylvania, U.S.
- Died: January 20, 2003 (aged 85); Youngstown, Ohio, U.S.
- Listed height: 6 ft 5 in (1.96 m)
- Listed weight: 263 lb (119 kg)

Career information
- High school: Redstone (Republic, Pennsylvania)
- College: Davis & Elkins
- NFL draft: 1941: 7th round, 59th overall pick

Career history

Playing
- Chicago Bears (1941, 1946)

Coaching
- Davis & Elkins (1947–1948) Chief assistant coach; Davis & Elkins (1950–1952) Head coach

Awards and highlights
- 2× NFL champion (1941, 1946); Pro Bowl (1941)

Career NFL statistics
- Games played: 14
- Stats at Pro Football Reference

John Lawrence "Ace" Federovitch (June 26, 1917 – January 20, 2003) was an American professional football player and coach. He played professionally as a tackle in the National Football League (NFL) for two seasons with the Chicago Bears, in 1941 and 1946. Federovitch served as the head football coach at his alma mater, Davis & Elkins College in Elkins, West Virginia, from 1950 to 1952.

Federovitch was the chief assistant coach at Davis & Elkins for three seasons, from 1947 to 1949, under Red Brown before succeeding him as head coach in 1950 when Brown left the school to coach basketball at West Virginia University.

== Head coaching record ==
| Year | Team | Overall | Conference | Standing | Bowl/playoffs |
|---|---|---|---|---|---|
Davis & Elkins Senators (West Virginia Intercollegiate Athletic Conference) (1950–1952)
| 1950 | Davis & Elkins | 5–5 | 4–4 | 7th | |
| 1951 | Davis & Elkins | 4–4 | 4–4 | 5th | |
| 1952 | Davis & Elkins | 4–5 | 4–3 | 4th | |
| Davis & Elkins: | | 13–14 | 12–11 | | |
| Total: | | 13–14 | | | |
