= Glen Kozlowski =

American football player (born 1962)

No. 83, 88
- Position: Wide receiver

Personal information
- Born: December 31, 1962 (age 63); Honolulu, Hawaii, U.S.
- Listed height: 6 ft 1 in (1.85 m)
- Listed weight: 200 lb (91 kg)

Career information
- High school: Carlsbad (Carlsbad, California)
- College: BYU
- NFL draft: 1986: 11th round, 305th overall pick

Career history
- Chicago Bears (1986–1992)

Awards and highlights
- National champion (1984); First-team All-WAC (1984)

Career NFL statistics
- Receptions: 31
- Receiving yards: 471
- Receiving touchdowns: 3
- Stats at Pro Football Reference

Glen Kozlowski (born December 31, 1962) is an American former professional football player who was a wide receiver for six seasons with the Chicago Bears of the National Football League (NFL). He played college football for the BYU Cougars.

== College career ==
Kozlowski, who wore number 7, was a standout wide receiver on BYU's 1984 National Championship Team; he was known for making clutch, acrobatic catches. At the time, Glen was one of only two players (along with Todd Christensen) to start at BYU as a true freshman, playing with several standout quarterbacks over the course of his career: Jim McMahon, Steve Young and Robbie Bosco. He once recorded double-digit receptions and over 200 yards receiving in a game (the Kickoff Classic, against Boston College). A Sports Illustrated article from the same period included a photo of Kozlowski leaping into the stands in celebration of one of his many touchdowns, reminiscent of the "Lambeau Leap" popularized by the Green Bay Packers in the 1990s.

Glen suffered a serious knee injury during his senior season that threatened to derail his goal of playing in the NFL. As a show of support for his injured teammate, BYU quarterback Robbie Bosco switched his jersey number from 6 to 7 for one game.

== Professional career ==
Kozlowski was selected by the Chicago Bears in the 11th round of the 1986 NFL draft. He spent the entire 1986 season on injured reserve, recovering from knee surgery. "Koz" struggled to recover from knee reconstruction and was waived by the Bears in 1987. A very fast and physical receiver in college, Kozlowski regained his speed after his injury. Years later he acknowledged having a difficult time making cuts in and out of pass patterns due to the knee problem. He later rejoined the team, playing as a replacement player during the NFL's strike season (1987).

Although Kozlowski played well in his replacement role, he suffered a broken leg while returning a kickoff, ending his "spare Bear" season. He returned to the Bears the following season and earned a spot on the regular season roster, principally as a special teams player. Because of his earlier releases and numerous re-signings, Kozlowski wore several different jersey numbers (83, 86, 88, and perhaps 96) while playing for the Bears. During his professional career, Kozlowski excelled on special teams, and was used sporadically at wide receiver. Arguably the most memorable catch of his professional career came during a 1988 Monday Night Football game against the San Francisco 49ers - a diving catch on a deep pass from Jim McMahon. Also of note, on special teams he once downed a punt at the one-yard line in spectacular fashion, toe dancing the goal line while pitching the football back to teammate Ron Morris.

== Personal life ==
Kozlowski's father is Polish and his mother is Samoan and Hawaiian. His brother Mike, played in the defensive backfield for the Miami Dolphins in the 1980s. Glen married his college girlfriend, Julie, and all of Kozlowski's sons attended BYU with one, Tyler, playing football as a freshman walk-on. Kozlowski is a weekend sports anchor on WGN-AM radio's Sports Central. Glen was also defeated in the 2007 Office Ball Championships held in Chicago by WGN Radio's David Kaplan.
