= Mike Hintz =

American football player (born 1965)

No. 35
- Positions: Cornerback, safety

Personal information
- Born: August 8, 1965 (age 61); Eau Claire, Wisconsin, U.S.
- Listed height: 6 ft 1 in (1.85 m)
- Listed weight: 190 lb (86 kg)

Career information
- High school: Waukesha South
- College: Wisconsin–Platteville
- NFL draft: 1987: undrafted

Career history
- Chicago Bears (1987)
- Stats at Pro Football Reference

Mike Hintz (born August 8, 1965) is an American former professional football defensive back in the National Football League (NFL). He played with the Chicago Bears during the 1987 NFL season.
