= Eldridge Milton =

American football player (born 1962)

No. 57
- Position: Linebacker

Personal information
- Born: December 8, 1962 (age 63); Folkston, Georgia, U.S.
- Listed height: 6 ft 1 in (1.85 m)
- Listed weight: 235 lb (107 kg)

Career information
- High school: Charlton County (GA)
- College: Clemson
- NFL draft: 1986: undrafted

Career history
- Denver Broncos (1986)*; Chicago Bears (1987)
- * Offseason or practice squad member only

Awards and highlights
- National champion (1981)

Career NFL statistics
- Games played: 3
- Kick returns: 1
- Kick return yards: 10
- Stats at Pro Football Reference

Eldridge Dennis Milton (born December 8, 1962) is an American former professional football player who was a linebacker for one season with the Chicago Bears of the National Football League (NFL). He played college football for the Clemson Tigers and was one of the replacement players signed during the 1987 NFL strike. He also had a stint with the Denver Broncos.

== Early life ==
Milton was born on December 8, 1962, in Folkston, Georgia. He grew up on his family's 200-acre farm there, and enjoyed playing with two of his "friends" – alligators nearby which he named Jimmy and Gypsy. "We started playing with them when they were young," he later said, "and I've been swimming and playing with them ever since. I've never been scared. Gators won't bother you unless they're hungry or they're cornered."

When asked how he played with alligators, Milton responded that he "just swims with them," saying, "We swim on their backs and we grab them around the neck, and turn them over on their backs. Then we rub their stomachs, and that puts them to sleep. To wake them up, we just hit them up on their chests." He was given the nickname of "Gator" for this. Milton attended Charlton County High School, where he played football on both offense and defense. He helped them reach a runner-up spot in the state championship, and graduated in 1981.

== College career ==
Milton began attending Clemson University, at which he studied industrial education, in 1981. He played for their football team as a linebacker and as a freshman won the national championship. That season, he was mainly a reserve who played on special teams. Milton redshirted in 1982. He returned in 1983 and earned his second varsity letter. Milton was one of Clemson's "steadiest defenders" during his final three seasons with the school. By 1985, he was the last remaining player from the championship squad to have earned a varsity letter. Milton graduated in 1986.

== Professional career ==
After going unselected in the 1986 NFL draft, Milton was signed by the Denver Broncos as an undrafted free agent, but did not make the team. He was given a contract by the Chicago Bears in mid-season of 1987, being a replacement player signed due to the Players Association strike. Making his debut in the 35–3 defeat of the Philadelphia Eagles, he appeared in all three strike games as a backup. Milton recorded his only career stat, a 10-yard kickoff return, during his third game, against the New Orleans Saints.
