= Mike January =

American football player (born 1964)

No. 94
- Position: Linebacker

Personal information
- Born: June 30, 1964 (age 62); Lake Charles, Louisiana, U.S.
- Listed height: 6 ft 1 in (1.85 m)
- Listed weight: 234 lb (106 kg)

Career information
- High school: Westlake
- College: Texas
- NFL draft: 1987: undrafted

Career history
- Chicago Bears (1987)

Career NFL statistics
- Sacks: 1
- Fumble recoveries: 1
- Stats at Pro Football Reference

Michael Anthony January (born June 30, 1964) is an American former professional football player who was a linebacker for three games with the Chicago Bears during the NFLPA strike of the National Football League (NFL) in 1987. He played college football for the Texas Longhorns.

His son Alex January is a 4-star defensive lineman recruit out of Duncanville, Texas, who has committed to the University of Texas at Austin.
