= Al Wolden =

American football player (born 1965)

No. 39
- Position: Running back

Personal information
- Born: April 11, 1965 (age 61); Gonvick, Minnesota, U.S.
- Listed height: 6 ft 3 in (1.91 m)
- Listed weight: 232 lb (105 kg)

Career information
- High school: Gonvick-Trail
- College: Bemidji State
- NFL draft: 1987: undrafted

Career history
- Chicago Bears (1987)

Career NFL statistics
- Rushing yards: 8
- Rushing average: 4
- Receptions: 1
- Receiving yards: 26
- Stats at Pro Football Reference

Alan Marvin O. Wolden (born April 11, 1965) is an American former professional football player who was a running back for the Chicago Bears of the National Football League (NFL). He played college football for the Bemidji State Beavers.
