= Brian Glasgow =

American football player (born 1961)

No. 81, 82
- Position: Tight end

Personal information
- Born: June 9, 1961 (age 65); Burlington, Iowa, U.S.
- Listed height: 6 ft 5 in (1.96 m)
- Listed weight: 230 lb (104 kg)

Career information
- High school: Dwight D. Eisenhower
- College: Northern Illinois
- NFL draft: 1983: undrafted

Career history
- Chicago Bears (1983)*; Chicago Blitz (1984); Chicago Bears (1987)
- * Offseason or practice squad member only

Career NFL statistics
- Receptions: 2
- Receiving yards: 16
- Stats at Pro Football Reference

Brian Gene Glasgow (born June 6, 1961) is an American former professional football player who was a tight end for the Chicago Bears of the National Football League (NFL). He played college football for the Northern Illinois Huskies.
