= Lew Barnes =

American football player (born 1962)

No. 81, 85, 80
- Position: Wide receiver

Personal information
- Born: December 27, 1962 (age 63); Long Beach, California, U.S.
- Listed height: 5 ft 8 in (1.73 m)
- Listed weight: 163 lb (74 kg)

Career information
- High school: Lincoln (San Diego, California)
- College: Oregon
- NFL draft: 1986: 5th round, 138th overall pick

Career history
- Chicago Bears (1986–1987); Detroit Lions (1988); Atlanta Falcons (1988); Kansas City Chiefs (1989); Buffalo Bills (1990)*; Kansas City Chiefs (1991)*
- * Offseason or practice squad member only

Awards and highlights
- First-team All-American (1985); 3× First-team All-Pac-10 (1983, 1984, 1985)

Career NFL statistics
- Punt/Kick returns: 102
- Return yardage: 1,066
- Yards per return: 10.4
- Stats at Pro Football Reference

Lew Eric Barnes (born December 27, 1962) is an American former professional football player who was a wide receiver for three seasons in the National Football League (NFL) for the Chicago Bears, Atlanta Falcons, and Kansas City Chiefs. He was selected 138th overall by the Bears in the fifth round of the 1986 NFL draft. Barnes played college football at the University of Oregon, where he was a first-team All-American as a senior.

== Early life ==
Barnes prepped at Lincoln High School in Southeast San Diego.
