= Frank Harris (running back) =

American football player (born 1964)

No. 36
- Position: Running back

Personal information
- Born: July 1, 1964 (age 62); Waukesha, Wisconsin, U.S.
- Listed height: 6 ft 1 in (1.85 m)
- Listed weight: 196 lb (89 kg)

Career information
- High school: Hampton
- College: NC State
- NFL draft: 1987: undrafted

Career history
- Chicago Bears (1987)

Career NFL statistics
- Rushing yards: 23
- Rushing average: 3.8
- Stats at Pro Football Reference

Frank Harris (born July 1, 1964) is an American former professional football player who was a running back for the Chicago Bears of the National Football League (NFL) in 1987. He played college football for the NC State Wolfpack.
