= Sean Smith (defensive tackle) =

American football player (born 1965)

No. 97, 62, 92
- Positions: Defensive tackle, defensive end

Personal information
- Born: March 27, 1965 (age 61); Bogalusa, Louisiana, U.S.
- Listed height: 6 ft 4 in (1.93 m)
- Listed weight: 280 lb (127 kg)

Career information
- High school: Bogalusa
- College: Grambling State
- NFL draft: 1987: 4th round, 101st overall pick

Career history
- Chicago Bears (1987–1988); Dallas Cowboys (1989); Tampa Bay Buccaneers (1989); San Francisco 49ers (1989); Los Angeles Rams (1989)

Career NFL statistics
- Sacks: 2
- Fumble recoveries: 1
- Safeties: 1
- Stats at Pro Football Reference

Sean Lamar Smith (born March 27, 1965) is an American former professional football player who was a defensive tackle for the Chicago Bears of the National Football League (NFL). He was selected by the Bears in the fourth round of the 1987 NFL draft. He played college football for the Grambling State Tigers.
