= Jim Althoff =

American football player (born 1961)

No. 70
- Position: Defensive tackle

Personal information
- Born: September 27, 1961 (age 65); McHenry, Illinois, U.S.
- Listed height: 6 ft 3 in (1.91 m)
- Listed weight: 280 lb (127 kg)

Career information
- High school: McHenry
- College: Winona State

Career history
- Buffalo Bills (1987)*; Chicago Bears (1987–1988); New York Giants (1989)*
- * Offseason or practice squad member only
- Stats at Pro Football Reference

James Althoff (born September 27, 1961) is an American former professional football player who was a defensive tackle in the National Football League (NFL). He played college football at Winona State University. During his senior season, he was named an NAIA All-American.

== Professional career ==
After graduation, he rejected an offer from USFL's Michigan Panthers but later played semi-professionally for a team in Delavan, Wisconsin. He attended an NFL-staffed tryout camp in Pennsylvania which led to the Buffalo Bills signing him for their preseason camp but he was cut before the start of the season. After the 1987 NFL players strike begun, he signed with the Chicago Bears of the NFL during the, appearing in four games with three starts. He was cut by the bears in August 1988, prior to the start of the season. In February 1989, he signed with the New York Giants prior to the 1989 season but was cut in August before the start of the season.
