= Sean McInerney =

American football player (born 1960)

No. 68
- Position: Defensive end

Personal information
- Born: December 27, 1960 (age 65)
- Listed height: 6 ft 3 in (1.91 m)
- Listed weight: 255 lb (116 kg)

Career information
- High school: Langley
- College: Frostburg State
- NFL draft: 1985: undrafted

Career history
- Baltimore Eagles (1985); Philadelphia Eagles (1986)*; Washington Commandos (1987); Chicago Bears (1987)
- * Offseason or practice squad member only
- Stats at Pro Football Reference

Sean Mallan McInerney (born December 27, 1960) is an American former professional football player who was a defensive end for the Chicago Bears of the National Football League (NFL). He was a replacement player during the NFL strike in 1987. He played college football for the Frostburg State Bobcats.
