= Kevin Brown (punter) =

American football player (born 1963)

No. 11
- Position: Punter

Personal information
- Born: January 11, 1963 (age 63); Panhandle, Texas, U.S.
- Listed height: 6 ft 2 in (1.88 m)
- Listed weight: 178 lb (81 kg)

Career information
- High school: Panhandle
- College: West Texas State
- NFL draft: 1987: undrafted

Career history
- Chicago Bears (1987); Tampa Bay Buccaneers (1988)*; Los Angeles Rams (1988)*; Cleveland Browns (1988)*; Phoenix Cardinals (1989)*
- * Offseason or practice squad member only

Career NFL statistics
- Punts: 18
- Punting yards: 742
- Longest punt: 58
- Stats at Pro Football Reference

Kevin Brown (born January 11, 1963) is an American former professional football player who was a punter in the National Football League (NFL). He played college football for the West Texas A&M Buffaloes.

== College career ==
Brown played college football for the Buffaloes at West Texas A&M University and was an honorable mention Little All-America selection by the Associated Press as a senior.

== Professional career ==
Brown was signed as an undrafted free agent in 1987 by the Chicago Bears and was originally cut at the end of training camp. He moved back to Texas and had been working as a farmer when he was re-signed by the Bears as a replacement player during the 1987 NFL players strike. Brown played in three games during the 1987 season but was released by the Bears when the strike ended. Brown was signed by the Los Angeles Rams in the offseason, but was cut during training camp.
