= Dick Chapura =

American football player (born 1964)

No. 94, 95, 97
- Position: Defensive tackle

Personal information
- Born: June 15, 1964 (age 62); Sarasota, Florida, U.S.
- Listed height: 6 ft 3 in (1.91 m)
- Listed weight: 277 lb (126 kg)

Career information
- High school: Riverview (Sarasota)
- College: Missouri
- NFL draft: 1987: 10th round, 277th overall pick

Career history
- Chicago Bears (1987–1989); Philadelphia Eagles (1990); Phoenix Cardinals (1990); Houston Oilers (1991)*; San Antonio Riders (1992)
- * Offseason or practice squad member only

Awards and highlights
- 2× Second-team All-Big Eight (1985, 1986)

Career NFL statistics
- Sacks: 6
- Fumble recoveries: 1
- Stats at Pro Football Reference

Richard Harry Chapura Jr. (born June 15, 1964) is an American former professional football player who was a defensive tackle in the National Football League (NFL) and the World League of American Football (WLAF). He played for the Chicago Bears, Philadelphia Eagles, and Phoenix Cardinals of the NFL, and the San Antonio Riders of the WLAF. He was selected by the Bears in the tenth round of the 1987 NFL draft. Chapura played college football for the Missouri Tigers. He became a fire lieutenant for the Englewood Fire Department in Englewood, Florida.

Pre-draft measurables
Height	Weight	Arm length	Hand span
6 ft 3 3/8 in (1.91 m)	275 lb (125 kg)	32 1/2 in (0.83 m)	9 1/4 in (0.23 m)
All values from NFL Combine
