= Doug Rothschild =

American football player (born 1965)

No. 54
- Position: Linebacker

Personal information
- Born: April 27, 1965 (age 61); Sunnyvale, California, U.S.
- Listed height: 6 ft 2 in (1.88 m)
- Listed weight: 231 lb (105 kg)

Career information
- High school: Fremont (Sunnyvale)
- College: Wheaton
- NFL draft: 1987: undrafted

Career history
- Chicago Bears (1987); Cincinnati Bengals (1988)*
- * Offseason or practice squad member only

Awards and highlights
- Wheaton College Hall of Honor (2007)

Career NFL statistics
- Games played: 3
- Stats at Pro Football Reference

Douglas Robert Rothschild (born April 27, 1965) is an American former professional football player who was a linebacker for one season in the National Football League (NFL) for the Chicago Bears. He played college football for the Wheaton Thunder.

== Early life and education ==
Rothschild was born on April 27, 1965, in Sunnyvale, California. He attended Fremont High School there, before playing college football at Wheaton College in Illinois. At the time of his graduation, with 22 quarterback sacks, he was second all-time among Wheaton players. He recorded nine sacks in both 1985 and 1986, leading the conference in both seasons. Rothschild was inducted into the Wheaton College Hall of Honor in 2007.

== Professional career ==
After going unselected in the 1987 NFL draft, Rothschild was signed by the Chicago Bears as an undrafted free agent on May 8, 1987. He was released in August but re-signed in late September as a replacement player during the 1987 NFL strike. He appeared in three games, none as a starter, playing linebacker. Rothschild was released at the end of the strike.

In 1988, Rothschild was signed by the Cincinnati Bengals, and played in their 14–7 victory in the Pro Football Hall of Fame Game. He was released shortly afterwards, ending his professional career.
