= Bruce McCray =

American football player (born 1963)

No. 31
- Position: Cornerback

Personal information
- Born: October 27, 1963 (age 63); United States
- Listed height: 5 ft 9 in (1.75 m)
- Listed weight: 181 lb (82 kg)

Career information
- High school: East (Wichita, Kansas)
- College: Independence CC (1983–1984); Western Illinois (1985–1986)
- NFL draft: 1987: undrafted

Career history
- Dallas Cowboys (1987)*; Chicago Bears (1987); Chicago Bruisers (1988)
- * Offseason or practice squad member only

Career NFL statistics
- Interceptions: 1
- Touchdowns: 1
- Stats at Pro Football Reference
- Stats at ArenaFan.com

Bruce Edward McCray (born October 27, 1963) is an American former professional football player who was a cornerback for one season with the Chicago Bears of the National Football League (NFL). He played college football at Independence Community College and Western Illinois University. He also played for the Chicago Bruisers of the Arena Football League (AFL).

== Early life and college ==
Bruce Edward McCray was born on October 27, 1963. He attended Wichita East High School in Wichita, Kansas.

He first played college football for the Independence Pirates of Independence Community College from 1983 to 1984. He was then a two-year letterman for the Western Illinois Leathernecks of Western Illinois University from 1985 to 1986.

== Professional career ==
After going undrafted in the 1987 NFL draft, McCray signed with the Dallas Cowboys on April 30. He was waived on July 28, 1987.

McCray was claimed off waivers by the Chicago Bears on July 28, 1987. He was waived on September 1. He was later re-signed by the Bears on September 23, during the 1987 NFL players strike. McCray started all three strike games for the Bears at left cornerback and returned an interception 23 yards for a touchdown. He was waived on October 22, 1987, after the strike ended.

McCray played in one game for the Chicago Bruisers of the Arena Football League (AFL) in 1988, recording two solo tackles and one pass breakup. He was listed as a wide receiver/defensive back during his time in the AFL as the league played under ironman rules.
