= John Adickes =

American football player (born 1964)

No. 54, 68
- Position: Center

Personal information
- Born: June 29, 1964 (age 62); Queens, New York, U.S.
- Listed height: 6 ft 3 in (1.91 m)
- Listed weight: 264 lb (120 kg)

Career information
- High school: Killeen (Killeen, Texas)
- College: Baylor
- NFL draft: 1987: 6th round, 154th overall pick

Career history
- Chicago Bears (1987–1988); Minnesota Vikings (1989)

Awards and highlights
- First-team All-SWC (1986)

Career NFL statistics
- Games played: 23
- Stats at Pro Football Reference

John Matthew Adickes (born June 29, 1964) is an American former professional football player who was a center in the National Football League (NFL). He played for the Chicago Bears from 1987 to 1988 and for the Minnesota Vikings in 1989. He played college football for the Baylor Bears.

Pre-draft measurables
Height	Weight	Arm length	Hand span	40-yard dash	10-yard split	20-yard split	20-yard shuttle	Vertical jump	Broad jump	Bench press
6 ft 2 3/4 in (1.90 m)	266 lb (121 kg)	30 in (0.76 m)	10 1/4 in (0.26 m)	4.97 s	1.71 s	2.88 s	4.60 s	26.5 in (0.67 m)	8 ft 7 in (2.62 m)	25 reps
All values from NFL Combine

Adickes was selected by the Bears in the sixth round of the 1987 NFL draft with the 154th overall pick.
