= Bobby Bell (linebacker, born 1962) =

American football player (born 1962)

No. 58, 97
- Position: Linebacker

Personal information
- Born: February 7, 1962 (age 64); St. Paul, Minnesota, U.S.
- Listed height: 6 ft 3 in (1.91 m)
- Listed weight: 217 lb (98 kg)

Career information
- High school: Lee's Summit
- College: Missouri
- NFL draft: 1984: 4th round, 91st overall pick

Career history
- New York Jets (1984); Cleveland Browns (1986)*; Chicago Bears (1987)
- * Offseason or practice squad member only

Awards and highlights
- First-team All-Big Eight (1983)

Career NFL statistics
- Sacks: 3.5
- Fumble recoveries: 1
- Stats at Pro Football Reference

Bobby Lee Bell Jr. (born February 7, 1962) is an American former professional football player who was a linebacker for the New York Jets and the Chicago Bears of the National Football League (NFL). He played college football for the Missouri Tigers.

== Personal life ==
Bell is the son of former Pro Football Hall of Fame player Bobby Bell.
