= Paul Migliazzo =

American football player (born 1964)

No. 92
- Position: Linebacker

Personal information
- Born: March 11, 1964 (age 62); Kansas City, Missouri, U.S.
- Listed height: 6 ft 1 in (1.85 m)
- Listed weight: 228 lb (103 kg)

Career information
- High school: Rockhurst (Kansas City)
- College: Oklahoma
- NFL draft: 1987: 8th round, 221st overall pick

Career history
- Chicago Bears (1987); Indianapolis Colts (1988)*
- * Offseason or practice squad member only
- Stats at Pro Football Reference

Paul Migliazzo (born March 11, 1964) is an American former professional football linebacker who was selected in the eighth round and played for the Chicago Bears in 1987. He played college football at the University of Oklahoma and was a member of the school's 1985 national championship team. Migliazzo was subsequently drafted 221st overall in the eighth round by the Bears under coach Mike Ditka in 1987. He was waived in December of that year.
