= Egypt Allen =

American football player (born 1964)

No. 47
- Position: Safety

Personal information
- Born: July 28, 1964 (age 62); Dallas, Texas, U.S.
- Listed height: 6 ft 0 in (1.83 m)
- Listed weight: 203 lb (92 kg)

Career information
- High school: South Oak Cliff (Dallas)
- College: TCU
- NFL draft: 1986: undrafted

Career history
- Chicago Bears (1986–1987)

Career NFL statistics
- Fumble recoveries: 2
- Stats at Pro Football Reference

Egypt Tyrone Allen (born July 28, 1964) is an American former professional football player who was a safety for one season with the Chicago Bears of the National Football League (NFL). He played college football for the TCU Horned Frogs.

== Early life ==
Allen grew up in Dallas, Texas and graduated from South Oak Cliff High School, where he starred as a defensive back on their football team.

Heavily recruited by colleges to play football, Allen matriculated at Texas Christian University in 1982, where he played three seasons as a defensive back.

== Controversy ==
In September of his senior year, Allen was one of 7 TCU players who publicly revealed that they had received cash in exchange for signing to play football with TCU. As soon as the payments were made public in September 1985, Allen and the other players were made ineligible to play (as per NCAA rules) and were removed from the team, though their scholarships were guaranteed through 1987. Allen and two other players sued the University in 1985, indicating that they had thought the payments were sanctioned by the University since one of the involved alumni, Richard Lowe, was a member of the TCU Board of Trustees, as well as a former TCU football player. Payments were also commonplace for blue chip athletes like Allen; Lowe later asserted that 29 TCU players were paid during the tenure of the TCU coach F.A. Dry who had recruited Allen.

Allen never again played a complete football season. In the context of the NCAA suspension, Allen declared for the NFL draft but was not drafted.

== Professional career ==
Allen was signed in the middle of the 1987 season by the Chicago Bears as a replacement player. While most replacement players were released after the 1987 NFL strike ended, Allen stayed. He played in a total of 6 games but was cut the following preseason.
