= Lorenzo Lynch =

American football player (born 1963)

No. 43, 29
- Position: Cornerback

Personal information
- Born: April 6, 1963 (age 63); Oakland, California, U.S.
- Listed height: 5 ft 11 in (1.80 m)
- Listed weight: 200 lb (91 kg)

Career information
- High school: Oakland
- College: Sacramento State
- NFL draft: 1987: undrafted

Career history
- Dallas Cowboys (1987)*; Chicago Bears (1987–1989); Phoenix/Arizona Cardinals (1990–1995); Oakland Raiders (1996–1997)
- * Offseason or practice squad member only

Awards and highlights
- NCAA Division II All-American (1986)

Career NFL statistics
- Interceptions: 17
- Forced fumbles: 8
- Touchdowns: 3
- Stats at Pro Football Reference

Lorenzo M. Lynch (born April 6, 1963) is an American former professional football player who was a defensive back in the National Football League (NFL) for the Chicago Bears, Phoenix/Arizona Cardinals, and Oakland Raiders. He played college football for the Sacramento State Hornets.

== Early life ==
Lynch attended Oakland High School. As a senior, he received All-city honors at running back.

He enrolled at Chabot Junior College. As a sophomore, he received All-League honors at running back.

He transferred to California State University, Sacramento, after his sophomore season. As a junior with the Hornets, he was converted into a safety. As a senior, he received NCAA Division II All-American honors.

In 1996, he was inducted into the Sacramento State Football Hall Of Fame.

== Professional career ==
=== Dallas Cowboys ===
Lynch was signed as an undrafted free agent by the Dallas Cowboys after the 1987 NFL draft in April. He was waived before the start of the season on July 27.

=== Chicago Bears ===
In August 1987, he was signed as a free agent by the Chicago Bears. He was waived before the start of the season on September 1.

After the NFLPA strike was declared on the third week of the season, those contests were canceled (reducing the 16-game season to 15) and the NFL decided that the games would be played with replacement players. On September 25, he was re-signed to be a part of the Chicago replacement team. He started in 2 games at right cornerback. On October 20, he was placed on the injured reserve list with a shoulder injury.

On August 29, 1988, he was placed on the injured reserve list, where he spent the first five weeks of the season. He was active for 11 regular-season games and both playoff contests as a backup defensive back. He had 11 special teams tackles.

In 1989, he appeared in all 16 games with 2 starts, registering 38 tackles, 3 interceptions and 8 passes defensed. He had 2 interceptions in the second game against the Detroit Lions.

=== Arizona Cardinals ===
On March 29, 1990, he signed as a free agent with the Arizona Cardinals. He appeared in all 16 games as a backup defensive back and was used mostly on the nickel defense. He had 21 defensive tackles and 15 special teams tackles (led the team).

In 1991, he started 14 games at cornerback. He posted 77 tackles, 3 interceptions, 7 passes defensed, 3 forced fumbles (second on the team), one fumble recovery and 11 special teams tackles. He had 13 tackles and one forced fumble in the second game against the Philadelphia Eagles. He had 2 interceptions, including one returned for his first career touchdown, in the thirteenth game against the Philadelphia Eagles.

In 1992, he appeared in 16 games with 9 starts. He posted 60 tackles, 7 passes defensed, one fumble recovery and led the team with 14 special teams tackles. He started first three games of the season at cornerback, before being sidelined with a groin injury in Week 4. He ended the season as a starter at cornerback. He had 12 tackles against the Dallas Cowboys. In the pregame show for the NFL Network's presentation of Thursday Night Football on September 20, 2012, former Cowboys receiver Michael Irvin recalled a game he played against Lynch (then playing for the Phoenix Cardinals) 20 years earlier on September 20, 1992. He quoted Lynch as stating before the game, "I'll be with you all day, Michael." Irvin went on to have one of his best games (in terms of numbers), catching for 210 yards and 3 touchdowns.

In 1993, he appeared in 16 games with 15 starts (10 at safety and 5 at cornerback), while leading the team in total plays with 925 out of 968 defensive snaps. He collected 65 tackles, 3 interceptions, 2 forced fumbles, 3 fumble recoveries and 13 special teams tackles. In the season opener against the Philadelphia Eagles, he had 10 tackles and one forced fumble, which he returned 55 yards for a touchdown.

In 1994, he appeared in 15 games with 15 starts at both safety and cornerback. He posted 140 tackles, 2 interceptions, 7 passes defensed and 2 forced fumbles. He started at cornerback against the Pittsburgh Steelers, making 7 tackles and one forced fumble in a 20–17 overtime win. He had 21 tackles against the Chicago Bears.

In 1995, he appeared in 12 games with 11 starts at safety. He tallied 79 tackles (fourth on the team), one sack and one interception. He set an NFL record for longest interception return in overtime (72 yards) against the Seattle Seahawks. On March 6, 1996, he was released because of salary cap considerations.

=== Oakland Raiders ===
On March 8, 1996, he signed as a free agent with the Oakland Raiders. He started all 16 games at strong safety, registering 94 tackles, 3 interceptions, 10 passes defensed, one forced fumble and 3 special teams tackles. He had 11 tackles against the Chicago Bears. He made 6 tackles, one interception and 2 passes defensed against the New York Jets on October 6.

On February 14, 1997, he was released because of salary cap considerations. On April 24, 1997, he was re-signed to a reduced contract. He appeared in 15 games as a backup defensive back. He had 2 interceptions and tied for first on the team with 14 special teams tackles. He wasn't re-signed after the season.

== Personal life ==
Lynch as a high school student, sold hot dogs and peanuts at Oakland Coliseum stadium during Raiders games.

His nephew Marshawn Lynch was a running back who compiled more than 10,000 yards rushing for the Buffalo Bills, Seattle Seahawks, and Oakland Raiders. He is also related to quarterback Josh Johnson, who played for 13 different NFL franchises.
