= Eugene Rowell =

American football player (born 1958)

No. 65
- Position: Defensive tackle

Personal information
- Born: February 15, 1958 (age 68); San Diego, California, U.S.
- Listed height: 6 ft 3 in (1.91 m)
- Listed weight: 265 lb (120 kg)

Career information
- High school: Fennimore (WI)
- College: Dubuque
- NFL draft: 1981: undrafted

Career history
- Seattle Seahawks (1981)*; Chicago Bears (1985-1986)*; Chicago Bears (1987); Chicago Bruisers (1988)
- * Offseason or practice squad member only
- Stats at Pro Football Reference

Eugene Rowell (born February 15, 1958) is a former member, albeit briefly, of the Chicago Bears during the 1987 NFL season. He played at the collegiate level at the University of Dubuque.

Rowell was star athlete at Dubuque, reaching to the 1979 NCAA Heavyweight championship in wrestling, and receiving Division III Football All-American honors in the same year. He was also named First-team All-Iowa Conference in 1978 and 1979, while the Spartans won three Iowa Intercollegiate Athletic Conference Championships (1978-1980).

Rowell signed as a undrafted free-agent with the Seattle Seahawks but got injured during training camp and subsequently released by the team. He spent the next two years rehabbing, before signing with the Chicago Bears in 1985. Rowell got cut from the team after training camp in 85' and 86', before eventually making the team in 1987, as replacement player.
