= Guy Teafatiller =

American football player (born 1964)

No. 93
- Position: Defensive tackle

Personal information
- Born: May 10, 1964 (age 62); Concord, California, U.S.
- Listed height: 6 ft 2 in (1.88 m)
- Listed weight: 260 lb (118 kg)

Career information
- High school: Warren (Downey, California)
- College: Illinois
- NFL draft: 1986: 10th round, 251st overall pick

Career history
- Buffalo Bills (1986)*; Chicago Bears (1987); Green Bay Packers (1987); Los Angeles Rams (1988)*
- * Offseason or practice squad member only

Career NFL statistics
- Sacks: 1.5
- Stats at Pro Football Reference

Guy Robert Teafatiller (born May 10, 1964) is an American former professional football player who was a defensive tackle for three games with the Chicago Bears of the National Football League (NFL) in 1987. He played college football for the Illinois Fighting Illini.
