= Don Kindt Jr. =

American football player (born 1961)

Don Kindt
No. 81
- Position: Tight end

Personal information
- Born: March 9, 1961 (age 65); Milwaukee, Wisconsin, U.S.
- Listed height: 6 ft 6 in (1.98 m)
- Listed weight: 242 lb (110 kg)

Career information
- High school: Brookfield Central
- College: Wisconsin-La Crosse
- NFL draft: 1985: undrafted

Career history
- Chicago Bears (1985)*; Green Bay Packers (1986)*; Chicago Bears (1987)
- * Offseason or practice squad member only

Career NFL statistics
- Receptions: 5
- Receiving yards: 34
- Touchdowns: 1
- Stats at Pro Football Reference

Don Kindt Jr. (born March 9, 1961) is a former tight end in the National Football League (NFL). He played with the Chicago Bears during the 1987 NFL season.

He is the son of former NFL Pro Bowler Don Kindt.
