= Ron Morris (American football) =

American football player (born 1964)

No. 84
- Position: Wide receiver

Personal information
- Born: November 4, 1964 (age 62); Cooper, Texas, U.S.
- Listed height: 6 ft 1 in (1.85 m)
- Listed weight: 190 lb (86 kg)

Career information
- High school: Cooper
- College: Southern Methodist
- NFL draft: 1987: 2nd round, 54th overall pick

Career history
- Chicago Bears (1987–1992)

Awards and highlights
- First-team All-SWC (1986); Second-team All-SWC (1983)

Career NFL statistics
- Receptions: 121
- Receiving yards: 1,991
- Receiving touchdowns: 9
- Stats at Pro Football Reference

Ronald Wayne Morris (born November 4, 1964) is an American former professional football player who was a wide receiver in the National Football League (NFL).

Pre-draft measurables
Height	Weight	40-yard dash	10-yard split	20-yard split	20-yard shuttle	Vertical jump	Broad jump	Bench press
6 ft 0 5/8 in (1.84 m)	187 lb (85 kg)	4.59 s	1.60 s	2.72 s	4.29 s	31.5 in (0.80 m)	9 ft 8 in (2.95 m)	8 reps
All values from NFL Combine

He was selected 54th overall in the second round by and played six seasons for the Chicago Bears from 1987 to 1992. In 1987, Morris received the Brian Piccolo Award which is awarded to the rookie that best exemplifies the teamwork, loyalty, dedication, sense of humor, and courage of the late Brian Piccolo. In 1995, Morris was awarded $5.2 million for a lawsuit stemming from a knee injury that ended his career.

His younger brother Bam Morris played for the Pittsburgh Steelers, Chicago Bears, Baltimore Ravens, and the Kansas City Chiefs.
