= 1919 Decatur Staleys season =

Sports season

- General manager: Fred P. Wasem
- Head coach: Robert E. Brannan
- Home stadium: Staley Field

Results
- Record: 6–1
- League place: Central Illinois Champions

The 1919 Decatur Staleys season was the first in the team's long existence, later becoming known as the Chicago Bears. It was also the only season in which the Staleys/Bears were an amateur team, not a member of the National Football League or managed by George Halas. The 1919 Staleys were a works team, made up purely of regular A. E. Staley Manufacturing Company employees, and finished with a 6–1 record to win the Central Illinois Championship.

== Founding ==
"Football is the latest phase of athletics which our versatile organization has undertaken. This newly organized team can boast as its coach one of the greatest quarterbacks Illinois ever produced, none other than our construction superintendent, James Cook. [...]
"Apparently Mr. Cook is going to weld that bunch of recruits into a splendid fighting machine of which Staley's can be proud. They'll just have to be good because M. P. O'Brien said we would have a good team or none at all, and of course, that settles it."

— Staley Fellowship Journal October 1919

A. E. Staley founder Augustus Eugene Staley never intended to create a national powerhouse. He founded the Staley athletic program because he thought that employees participating in sports, either actively or as spectators, would grow to value the lessons learned of being a team player, good sportsmanship, character building as well as building a sense of team/factory loyalty. On September 20, 1919, he organized a meeting with members of the Staley baseball team – which was founded in 1917 – who were interested in forming a football branch. He provided $1,000 to the group for equipment, while Staleys outfielder Fred P. "Fritz" Wasem was named team manager. To assist him, he appointed company Superintendent of Construction James "Jim" Cook and former Millikin University head coach Robert E. Brannan as coaches.

The team's roster was made up of the existing pool of Staley employees, many of whom had experience playing college football, though Wasem also held tryouts for those interested; he proclaimed his group was "going to have the best independent team Decatur has ever had." Chuck Dressen competed with Pete Devore for the starting quarterback job and won the position, while other players included brothers Walt "Red" and Charlie "Baldy" May, both of whom were teammates with the Taylorville Independents, Millikin fullback Jake Lanum, and lieutenant Robert Crisp. For salaries, the players received shares from gate receipts; although they were estimated to be paid $10–20 per game, the number was lower due to travel expenses and opposing teams also getting their split of the ticket sales. The Decatur Daily Review speculated those who were signed to play occasional games may have received more.

The first practice took place on September 24, with the Staleys wearing maroon jerseys. The team played their home games at Staley Field, the Staley Manufacturing athletic field, which had a seating capacity of 1,500 with another 1,000 standing. Fans were charged $1 to attend games and company employees received a 50% discount. When the field was used for football, the goal posts were placed in the outfield of the baseball configuration. Staley Field was later used by the minor league baseball team Decatur Commodores.

== Roster ==
Name	Position	Notes
Robert E. Brannan	E/Coach	
James Cook	Manager	
Fred P. "Fritz" Wasem	E/Manager	
Andrew David "Andy" Lotshaw	Trainer	Cubs and Bears longtime trainer
Roy Adkins	G	1920 team member
(?) Bailey	E	
(John W.)? Brant	HB	
Perry Brecount	QB	
(?) Casey	HB	
Frank Manley Chase	G	
"Joe" Cooper	E	
Robert L. "Bob" Crisp	G	
(?) Dancliff	C	
Chuck Dressen	QB/HB	1920 team member
(Edward G.)? Eckhoff	E	
(?) Gammel	G	
Sid Gepford	HB/FB	1920 team member
Henry J. Halterman	G	
Marvin Harrop Sr.	T	
Bob Koehler	T	1920 team member
William Lutz Krigbaum	G/FB	Colonel U.S. Army
Jake Lanum	HB/DB	1920 team member
Chester A. "Baldy" May	T	
Walt May	G	1920 team member
(?) McGrath	C	
(?) McElvey	HB	
Jack Mintun	C/MG	1920 team member
George H. Moffett	T	
"Bun" Moran	G	
(?) Pyrzynski	HB/FB	
C. Lawrence Thrift	FB/E	
Willard C. Volentine	E	
Walt Veach	HB	1920 team member
A. Wade Wacaser	T	
John A. Wagner Sr.	E	Wagner Foundry
Paul C. Wilson	E	Methodist Minister Rev. Paul C. Wilson
Ray C. "Buster" Woodworth	E	
Lester "Lefty" Wallack		

== Schedule ==
Game	Date	Opponent	Result	Record	Venue	Attendance
1	October 5	Peoria Tractors	L 0–3	0–1	Lake View Park	1,000
2	October 12	Stonington	W 50–3	1–1	Staley Field	1,000
3	October 19	Staunton	W 89–0	2–1	Staley Field	1,000
4	October 26	Rantoul Aviators	Canceled	2–1	Staley Field	
5	November 2	Champaign Eleven	W 32–0	3–1	Staley Field	
6	November 11	Taylorville Independents	W 21–7	4–1	Hoover Field	5,000
7	November 16	Rantoul Aviators	W 61–0	5–1	Staley Field	
8	November 23	Arcola Independents	W 41–0	6–1	Staley Field	
9	November 30	Arcola Independents	Canceled	6–1	Arcola, IL	

== Game summaries ==
The team played their games mostly on Sundays, the company day off, apart from their road game against the Taylorville Independents.

=== Game 1: at Peoria Tractors ===
October 5, 1919, at Lake View Park

The Staleys played their first game against another industrial team by the name of Peoria Tractors, which represent a nearby branch of the company later called Caterpillar Inc. The previous week, the Tractors won their season opener against a Clinton, Iowa team 27–0. Despite poor weather, the game saw "over 1,000 fans".

Since the team had only four practices leading up to the game, the Staleys focused on a defensive game plan. As a result, the Tractors struggled offensively, making substitutions 16 times against the Staleys' four and losing multiple fumbles. At one point, Peoria reached Decatur's goal line but failed to score. On the other side, Decatur's offense of "line plunges and end runs" also saw little progress.

In the third quarter, the Staleys fumbled on a punt and the Tractors recovered. On fourth down, Peoria's "Red" Lawler attempted a 30-yard drop kick; although referee Martin, a Tractors coach, ruled he missed the kick, Peoria head coach and umpire Conway argued otherwise. Upon further debate, Martin agreed in Conway's favor, making the score 3–0. The Staleys failed to answer.

=== Game 2: vs. Stonington ===
October 12, 1919, at Staley Field

For the home opener, the Staleys hosted a team from Stonington, who lost 42–0 to Taylorville in their latest game. Stonington and the Staleys also played against each other in baseball in September, which the Staleys won 5–1; in their pre-game report, The Decatur Herald wrote Stonington wanted to "get revenge" for the loss.

On the first play of the game, Jack Mintun intercepted Stonington quarterback Hise's pass and returned it for a 20-yard touchdown. Lanum recorded two touchdowns, while Bob Koehler scored when he recovered Wasem's fumble at the goal line. By halftime, the Staleys led 44–0. In the third quarter, Stonington scored the only points on a 25-yard drop kick, while Decatur added six more points for the 50–3 win.

Approximately 1,000 fans attended the game. Two days later, The Herald wrote the crowd "showed [Decatur's] interest in the Staley team and the locals are assured of even greater crowds if they get teams of more equal caliber to meet."

=== Game 3: vs. Staunton ===
October 19, 1919, at Staley Field

Wasem attempted to schedule a game against a Danvers team, but it was canceled the Tuesday before it was to take place. Instead, the Staleys played Staunton, a team consisting of coal miners.

Before the game, Wasem conducted tryouts, during which the Staleys acquired former Decatur High School fullback and United States Army major Lutz Krigbaum. Krigbaum moved to left tackle with the Staleys, while C. Lawrence Thrift switched from end to fullback and Lanum was moved to right halfback.

Staunton fumbled on the opening drive, which the Staleys capitalized on with Thrift's touchdown run. On the ensuing drive, Lanum intercepted their quarterback Ackerman and scored on the return; Lanum intercepted him again to set up Thrift's second touchdown. In the second quarter, Lanum scored again. At halftime, the Staleys led 40–0. Krigbaum made his Decatur debut in the second half, while Lanum added two more touchdowns and Dressen had two of his own. Two more touchdowns via Mintun recovering Ackerman's muffed punt and running for the 30-yard score and Lanum's sixth score made the final score 89–0.

=== Game 4: vs. Rantoul Aviators ===
October 26, 1919, at Staley Field

After being unable to organize games against teams from Moline, Spring Valley, and Pine Ridge, Indiana, the Staleys secured a matchup against the Rantoul Aviators of Chanute Field. The Aviators' most recent game was a 31–0 loss to the Arcola Independents, which coach and lieutenant colonel Longanecker explained was a result of missing all but two starters. For pre-game entertainment, the Aviators prepared two planes for lieutenants Charles M. Leonard and Greer to fly over Staley Field, while Corporal Graham and team captain Shinn, a Decatur native, were to serve as copilots.

The game was scheduled to take place on Sunday at 2:45 PM, so the Aviators left Rantoul at 8 AM in two army trucks. However, the trucks broke down in Cerro Gordo and Argenta, rendering them unable to arrive in Decatur on time. As a result, the game was canceled; although an ambulance carrying Graham reached Decatur at 4 PM, he and his entourage later left by railroad. The two trucks reached Decatur on Monday morning, long after the game was called off.

=== Game 5: vs. Champaign Eleven ===
November 2, 1919, at Staley Field

With the November 11 Taylorville Independents game on the horizon, the Staleys played a preparatory game against the Champaign Eleven, a club featuring players from the University of Illinois who were ruled ineligible to play for the Illinois Fighting Illini football team. The Eleven had defeated Arcola 9–0 in their last game and the Rantoul Aviators "by a decisive margin" before that. Prior to the game, Decatur recruited ex-Millikin player George Moffett and former baseball player Ray "Buster" Woodworth.

The game was marred by a muddy field as both teams struggled, resulting in a 0–0 tie at halftime. Late in the third quarter, Dressen scored the first points on a touchdown, followed by Mintun returning a fumble for a score. In the fourth quarter, Dressen had two more touchdowns and Lanum recorded one. Shortly before the game's conclusion, Champaign recovered an onside kick but turned the ball over on downs as they lost 32–0. Despite the shutout win, The Herald criticized the Staleys for their poor first half and wrote "the locals must play an entirely different class of football" to beat Taylorville. Brannan was also unsatisfied with the victory and promised he would push the team harder in practices.

=== Game 6: vs. Taylorville Independents ===
November 11, 1919, at Hoover Field

In their biggest game to date, Decatur traveled to Taylorville to face the Independents at Hoover Field on November 11. The Independents were considered the top team in Illinois, having shut out all but three teams (losing just once) since their formation in 1914; entering the Staleys game, they were 4–0 with every win being a shutout, including a 78–0 win against Carlinville.

For the game, the Staleys arranged a special train that left via the Illinois Central Station. The Staleys brought their full roster including those who weren't expected to play, while A. E. Staley's mechanical and construction plants were closed to allow their employees to attend, though the manufacturing department had to stay behind. In addition to fans, A. E. Staley and company superintendent George Chamberlain also traveled with the team. To accommodate the visitors, Hoover Field added 800 seats along the south side, though part of the bleachers collapsed with no injuries.

After Taylorville punted, the Staleys struck first on Lanum's touchdown run. Walt Veach intercepted Taylorville's quarterback Jones on the following drive and returned it for a 60-yard touchdown. The rest of the first half and third quarter saw no scoring; although the Independents reached the Staleys' one-yard line, they failed to score. Early in the fourth quarter, Taylorville finally scored with a one-yard touchdown run by halfback Miller, but lost a fumble when they regained possession. In response, Dressen performed a fake throw and end-around, an act that The Herald considered "one of the cleanest plays of the day", for the game-clinching touchdown. Switching to a passing-based offense, Taylorville attempted to move downfield but failed to score as the Staleys pulled off the 21–7 upset. A day after the game, team executive Morgan O'Brien announced the Staleys would recognize themselves as the Central Illinois champions, explaining "Taylorville has held the title for several years. The Rock Island team I suppose is also claiming it but we can't get a game with them. Outside of that, I don't suppose any other team will contest our claim. Spring Valley is out of it because Kewanee beat them recently and next Sunday Taylorville plays Kewanee and it is almost a cinch that Taylorville with win."

For the game, the Staleys signed Millikin Big Blue back Sid Gepford and guard Roy Adkins, a violation of their college eligibility rules. When Millikin head coach Norman Wann received word of their participation, he arrived in Taylorville to watch the second half. Later in the week, he banned the two from Millikin sports, while the university considered expulsion before letting them stay in school. Wann and university president J. C. Hessler accused Brannan of influencing them into joining, but Wann later recanted his words. The two joined the Staleys permanently for the rest of the year and 1920; Adkins was already working for the company as a part timer to pay for college, while Gepford later also played for the Staley basketball team.

The Staley game drew the largest profit for the Independents in 1919 at $500, one of just two games to result in positive finances for them. Taylorville attempted to schedule a rematch on Thanksgiving Day; while they had a game scheduled against Spring Valley that day, they sought to form a new rivalry with the Staleys. Although O'Brien attempted to organize games on November 30 (ruled out due to the Taylorville–Spring Valley game) and December 7 (plagued by concerns of inclement weather), Staley and Wasem ended discussions as they argued the Independents would have to hire ringers to defeat them.

=== Game 7: vs. Rantoul Aviators ===
November 16, 1919, at Staley Field

The Staleys returned to Decatur to play the Aviators, who were able to arrive at the game this time as they traveled by Illinois Traction System. The Aviators also arranged for two planes to fly from Chanute Field, a trip that forced them to refuel after strong winds lengthened their flights, and performed over Decatur before kickoff to promote the game and at halftime.

Wasem and Veach missed the game after suffering shoulder injuries against Taylorville, as did Thrift. Despite the absences and failing to score on the first drive, backup halfback Pyrzynski scored the opening points with an eight-yard touchdown. Mintun's field goal, Dressen's end-around "famous trick play" 15-yard touchdown, and a 40-yard touchdown run by Lanum gave the Staleys a 17–0 lead by the end of the first quarter. Early in the second quarter, the Staleys fumbled at the goal line and an Aviator recovered in the end zone, resulting in a safety. After Krigbaum scored, Decatur led 33–0 at halftime. Lanum scored three more touchdowns in the second half and Pyrzynski added another in the 61–0 shutout.

=== Game 8: vs. Arcola Independents ===
November 23, 1919, at Staley Field

Shortly after the Taylorville game, O'Brien scheduled a meeting with the Arcola Independents. Arcola, who entered the game 5–1, was viewed by The Herald as a more formidable opponent than Taylorville, reasoning that Arcola's 37–0 win over an Illiopolis team was more impressive than Taylorville's 33–0 victory over the same team. The Independents' roster featured center "Bun" Moran, who played for the Staleys against Taylorville and therefore had knowledge of Decatur's strategies, and various players from the Champaign Eleven. These additions raised suspicion from Decatur newspapers who accused Arcola of "loading up" their roster for the game; the Decatur Daily Review's Arcola correspondent refuted the claims and said the players were "none other than honest sons of honest farmers" who viewed football as "only a sideline".

Gepford and Dressen quickly made gains on offense through passing and rushing, respectively, to set up the latter's 30-yard touchdown run. In the second quarter, Arcola lost a fumble that led to Dressen's trick play and a two-yard score. Lanum scored on a ten-yard run shortly before halftime to put the Staleys up 20–0. Another Staley touchdown opened the second half, forcing Arcola to resort to a pass-heavy offense that resulted in two interceptions. One of the turnovers resulted in a touchdown by Lanum, with Gepford throwing a touchdown pass to Bailey for the final score in the 41–0 shutout.

Although The Daily Review remarked "Arcola got what the other side usually gets", Decatur papers commended Arcola for their performance. The Herald noted the game "was a much better one than was indicated by the score as the Arcola team did not give up though they were unable to penetrate the Staley defense."

=== Game 9: vs. Arcola Independents ===
November 30, 1919, at Arcola, IL

After the resounding defeat, Arcola executives requested a rematch in Arcola; although the Staleys expressed discontent due to dirty play by the Independents, Arcola assured those responsible would not be allowed to play. To avoid another loss, the Independents decided to rally and field a more competitive team by contacting Edward "Dutch" Sternaman, the University of Illinois' top running back, and urging him to build a better roster. Although Sternaman agreed and created a stronger team, Staley received word of the news and ordered his players to not play, aware it would result in a revenge blowout.

The Herald described the game as being canceled for poor weather. The Staley Museum director Laura Jahr explained, "Staley felt (Sternaman building up Arcola's roster) was unfair — his players were just guys from the company. He wasn't willing to send his players in to be humiliated."

== Legacy ==
The Staleys ended their inaugural season with a 6–1 record, and they claimed the Central Illinois Championship.

At season's end, the Staley Athletic Association was formed to oversee the football and other sports teams. Such duties were originally handled by the Staley Fellowship Club, whose responsibilities shifted to managing employee sickness and death benefits. The association also formed a basketball team for the winter 1919 season, which some members of the football team like Gepford and Woodworth joined; Woodworth also served as the team's manager and captain.

Staley also decided to grow his football team into professional status. He first contacted Sternaman to build the team, but the future Bears executive was not ready to make a commitment as he wanted to complete his degree at the University of Illinois. Sternaman's former Illinois teammate George Halas was Staley's next target, and he was hired in March 1920 to oversee the football team in addition to playing baseball for a weekly wage of $50. After Halas assumed control of the Staley football club, Sternaman was the first player to sign with the club; the two would later become co-owners of the Bears.

The Staleys were founding members of the National Football League (then known as the American Professional Football Association) in 1920. After moving to Chicago the following year, they became the Chicago Bears in 1922. In 2003, the Bears introduced Staley Da Bear as their mascot, with the name being a tribute to A. E. Staley.

== Notable players ==
- Chuck Dressen, Quarterback & halfback
- Jake Lanum, Halfback & defensive back
- Jake Mintun, Center, middle guard & kicker
- Walt May, Guard
- Walt Veach, Halfback
- Sid Gepford, Halfback & blocking back (from Millikin)
- Roy Adkins, Guard (from Millikin)
