= List of Chicago Bears seasons =

The Chicago Bears franchise was founded as the Decatur Staleys, a charter member of the American Professional Football Association (APFA). The team moved to Chicago, Illinois, in 1921 and changed its name to the Bears in 1922, the same year the APFA changed its name to the National Football League (NFL). This list documents the franchise's completed seasons from 1920 to present, including postseason records and results from postseason games.

The Chicago Bears have played over 1,000 games in their history, and have had eight NFL Championships victories and one Super Bowl win. The Bears' nine championships are the second most by any team in NFL history. The franchise has captured 18 NFL divisional titles and four NFL conference championships. The Bears have also recorded the second most regular season victories of any NFL franchise.

The franchise has experienced three major periods of continued success in their history. The first period of success came from 1932 to 1946 when the Bears won six NFL Championships. In this period the Bears participated in the first National Football League playoff game, the first NFL Championship Game, and became the American football sports dynasty of the 1940s. The Bears played in four straight NFL Championship Games between 1940 and 1943, winning three of them, including an NFL record 73–0 victory over the Washington Redskins in 1940. The second period of success was between 1984 and 1991 when the Bears captured six NFC Central Division titles in eight years and won Super Bowl XX. A brief period of success stretched from 2005 to 2007 when the franchise captured two straight NFC North titles and a NFC Championship title, which earned them a berth in Super Bowl XLI, a game that the Bears lost to the Indianapolis Colts.

Despite their historic championship record and long periods of success, the Bears have also experienced periods of failure in their history. The franchise finished in last place within its division five times in the 1970s. In 1971, the team moved from Wrigley Field to Soldier Field to play its home games. In the mid- to late 1990s and early 2000s, the Bears posted six seasons with 10 or more losses. In the 1969 season, the franchise posted their worst regular season record with a 1–13 showing.

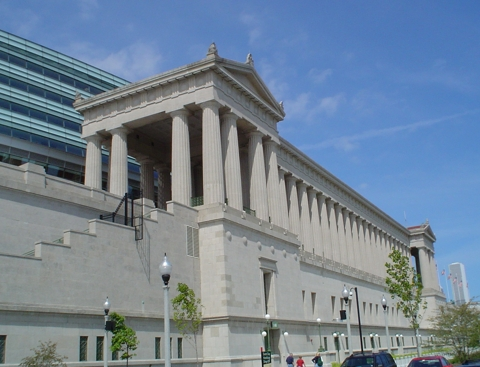
Soldier Field, current home of the Chicago Bears

== Legend ==
(#)	The order of league championship won by the franchise
Finish	Final position in league, division, or conference
T-#	Finished tied in that position with one or more teams
	NFL champions (1920–1969)
	Super Bowl champions (1970–present)
	Conference champions
	Division champions
	Wild Card berth
	One-game playoff berth

== Season records ==
Season	Team	League	Conference	Division	Regular season					Postseason results	Awards	Head coach	Ref.
Season	Team	League	Conference	Division	Finish	W	L	T	Pct	Postseason results	Awards	Head coach	Ref.
Decatur Staleys
1919	1919	Ind.			—	6	1	0	.857	Named Central Illinois Champions		Robert E. Brannan	^{[a]}
1920	1920	APFA			2nd	10	1	2	.846	The APFA did not hold playoff games		George Halas	^{[a]}
Chicago Staleys
1921	1921	APFA			1st	9	1	1	.864	Named APFA Champions		George Halas	^{[b]}
Chicago Bears
1922	1922	NFL			2nd	9	3	0	.750	The NFL did not hold playoff games until 1932		George Halas	
1923	1923	NFL			2nd	9	2	1	.792	The NFL did not hold playoff games until 1932		George Halas	
1924	1924	NFL			2nd	6	1	4	.727	The NFL did not hold playoff games until 1932		George Halas	
1925	1925	NFL			7th	9	5	3	.618	The NFL did not hold playoff games until 1932		George Halas	
1926	1926	NFL			2nd	12	1	3	.844	The NFL did not hold playoff games until 1932		George Halas	
1927	1927	NFL			3rd	9	3	2	.714	The NFL did not hold playoff games until 1932		George Halas	
1928	1928	NFL			5th	7	5	1	.577	The NFL did not hold playoff games until 1932		George Halas	
1929	1929	NFL			9th	4	9	2	.333	The NFL did not hold playoff games until 1932		George Halas	
1930	1930	NFL			3rd	9	4	1	.679	The NFL did not hold playoff games until 1932		Ralph Jones	
1931	1931	NFL			3rd	8	5	0	.615	The NFL did not hold playoff games until 1932		Ralph Jones	
1932	1932	NFL			1st	7	1	6	.714	Named NFL Champions (2)		Ralph Jones	^{[c]}
1933	1933	NFL		Western	1st	10	2	1	.808	Won NFL Championship (3) (Giants) 23–21		George Halas	^{[d]}
1934	1934	NFL		Western	1st	13	0	0	1.000	Lost NFL Championship (at Giants) 13–30		George Halas	^{[e]}
1935	1935	NFL		Western	T-3rd	6	4	2	.583			George Halas	
1936	1936	NFL		Western	2nd	9	3	0	.750			George Halas	
1937	1937	NFL		Western	1st	9	1	1	.864	Lost NFL Championship (Redskins) 21–28		George Halas	
1938	1938	NFL		Western	3rd	6	5	0	.545			George Halas	
1939	1939	NFL		Western	2nd	8	3	0	.727			George Halas	
1940	1940	NFL		Western	1st	8	3	0	.727	Won NFL Championship (4) (at Redskins) 73–0		George Halas	^{[f]}
1941	1941	NFL		Western	1st	10	1	0	.909	Won Divisional playoff (Packers) 33–14; Won NFL Championship (5) (Giants) 37–9		George Halas	^{[g]}
1942	1942	NFL		Western	1st	11	0	0	1.000	Lost NFL Championship (at Redskins) 6–14		George Halas (5–0) Hunk Anderson & Luke Johnsos (6–0)	^{[e]}
1943	1943	NFL		Western	1st	8	1	1	.850	Won NFL Championship (6) (Redskins) 41–21	Sid Luckman (MVP)	Hunk Anderson & Luke Johnsos	
1944	1944	NFL		Western	T-2nd	6	3	1	.650			Hunk Anderson & Luke Johnsos	
1945	1945	NFL		Western	4th	3	7	0	.300			Hunk Anderson & Luke Johnsos	
1946	1946	NFL		Western	1st	8	2	1	.773	Won NFL Championship (7) (at Giants) 24–14		George Halas	
1947	1947	NFL		Western	2nd	8	4	0	.667			George Halas	
1948	1948	NFL		Western	2nd	10	2	0	.833			George Halas	
1949	1949	NFL		Western	2nd	9	3	0	.750			George Halas	
1950	1950	NFL	National		T-1st	9	3	0	.750	Lost Conference playoff (at Rams) 14–24		George Halas	^{[h]}
1951	1951	NFL	National		4th	7	5	0	.583			George Halas	
1952	1952	NFL	National		5th	5	7	0	.417			George Halas	
1953	1953	NFL	Western		4th	3	8	1	.292			George Halas	
1954	1954	NFL	Western		2nd	8	4	0	.667			George Halas	
1955	1955	NFL	Western		2nd	8	4	0	.667			George Halas	
1956	1956	NFL	Western		1st	9	2	1	.792	Lost NFL Championship (at Giants) 7–47	George Halas (EOY)	Paddy Driscoll	
1957	1957	NFL	Western		5th	5	7	0	.417			Paddy Driscoll	
1958	1958	NFL	Western		T-2nd	8	4	0	.667			George Halas	
1959	1959	NFL	Western		2nd	8	4	0	.667			George Halas	
1960	1960	NFL	Western		5th	5	6	1	.458			George Halas	
1961	1961	NFL	Western		T-3rd	8	6	0	.571			George Halas	
1962	1962	NFL	Western		3rd	9	5	0	.643			George Halas	
1963	1963	NFL	Western		1st	11	1	2	.857	Won NFL Championship (8) (Giants) 14–10	George Halas (COY)	George Halas	
1964	1964	NFL	Western		6th	5	9	0	.357			George Halas	
1965	1965	NFL	Western		3rd	9	5	0	.643		George Halas (COY)	George Halas	
1966	1966	NFL	Western		5th	5	7	2	.429			George Halas	
1967	1967	NFL	Western	Central	2nd	7	6	1	.536			George Halas	^{[i]}
1968	1968	NFL	Western	Central	2nd	7	7	0	.500			Jim Dooley	
1969	1969	NFL	Western	Central	4th	1	13	0	.071			Jim Dooley	
1970	1970	NFL	NFC	Central	4th	6	8	0	.429			Jim Dooley	^{[j]}
1971	1971	NFL	NFC	Central	3rd	6	8	0	.429			Jim Dooley	
1972	1972	NFL	NFC	Central	4th	4	9	1	.321			Abe Gibron	^{[k]}
1973	1973	NFL	NFC	Central	4th	3	11	0	.214		Wally Chambers (DROY)	Abe Gibron	
1974	1974	NFL	NFC	Central	4th	4	10	0	.286			Abe Gibron	
1975	1975	NFL	NFC	Central	3rd	4	10	0	.286			Jack Pardee	
1976	1976	NFL	NFC	Central	2nd	7	7	0	.500			Jack Pardee	
1977	1977	NFL	NFC	Central	2nd	9	5	0	.643	Lost Divisional playoffs (at Cowboys) 7–37	Walter Payton (MVP, OPOY, WP MOY)	Jack Pardee	
1978	1978	NFL	NFC	Central	4th	7	9	0	.438			Neill Armstrong	
1979	1979	NFL	NFC	Central	2nd	10	6	0	.625	Lost Wild Card playoffs (at Eagles) 17–27		Neill Armstrong	
1980	1980	NFL	NFC	Central	3rd	7	9	0	.438			Neill Armstrong	
1981	1981	NFL	NFC	Central	5th	6	10	0	.375			Neill Armstrong	
1982	1982	NFL	NFC		12th	3	6	0	.333			Mike Ditka	^{[l]}
1983	1983	NFL	NFC	Central	3rd	8	8	0	.500			Mike Ditka	
1984	1984	NFL	NFC	Central	1st	10	6	0	.625	Won Divisional playoffs (at Redskins) 23–19; Lost NFC Championship (at 49ers) 0–23		Mike Ditka	
1985	1985	NFL	NFC	Central	1st	15	1	0	.938	Won Divisional playoffs (Giants) 21–0; Won NFC Championship (Rams) 24–0; Won Super Bowl XX (9) (vs. Patriots) 46–10	Richard Dent (SB MVP); Mike Singletary (DPOY); Mike Ditka (COY)	Mike Ditka	^{[m]}
1986	1986	NFL	NFC	Central	1st	14	2	0	.875	Lost Divisional playoffs (Redskins) 13–27		Mike Ditka	
1987	1987	NFL	NFC	Central	1st	11	4	0	.733	Lost Divisional playoffs (Redskins) 17–21	Dave Duerson (WP MOY)	Mike Ditka	^{[n]}
1988	1988	NFL	NFC	Central	1st	12	4	0	.750	Won Divisional playoffs (Eagles) 20–12; Lost NFC Championship (49ers) 3–28	Mike Singletary (DPOY); Mike Ditka (COY)	Mike Ditka	^{[o]}
1989	1989	NFL	NFC	Central	4th	6	10	0	.375			Mike Ditka	
1990	1990	NFL	NFC	Central	1st	11	5	0	.688	Won Wild Card playoffs (Saints) 16–6; Lost Divisional playoffs (at Giants) 3–31	Mark Carrier (DROY); Mike Singletary (WP MOY)	Mike Ditka	
1991	1991	NFL	NFC	Central	2nd	11	5	0	.688	Lost Wild Card playoffs (Cowboys) 13–17		Mike Ditka	
1992	1992	NFL	NFC	Central	4th	5	11	0	.313			Mike Ditka	
1993	1993	NFL	NFC	Central	4th	7	9	0	.438			Dave Wannstedt	
1994	1994	NFL	NFC	Central	4th	9	7	0	.563	Won Wild Card playoffs (at Vikings) 35–18; Lost Divisional playoffs (at 49ers) 15–44		Dave Wannstedt	
1995	1995	NFL	NFC	Central	3rd	9	7	0	.563			Dave Wannstedt	
1996	1996	NFL	NFC	Central	3rd	7	9	0	.438			Dave Wannstedt	
1997	1997	NFL	NFC	Central	5th	4	12	0	.250			Dave Wannstedt	
1998	1998	NFL	NFC	Central	5th	4	12	0	.250			Dave Wannstedt	
1999	1999	NFL	NFC	Central	5th	6	10	0	.375			Dick Jauron	
2000	2000	NFL	NFC	Central	5th	5	11	0	.313		Brian Urlacher (DROY); Jim Flanigan (WP MOY)	Dick Jauron	
2001	2001	NFL	NFC	Central	1st	13	3	0	.813	Lost Divisional playoffs (Eagles) 19–33	Dick Jauron (COY); Anthony Thomas (OROY)	Dick Jauron	
2002	2002	NFL	NFC	North	3rd	4	12	0	.250			Dick Jauron	
2003	2003	NFL	NFC	North	3rd	7	9	0	.438			Dick Jauron	
2004	2004	NFL	NFC	North	4th	5	11	0	.313			Lovie Smith	
2005	2005	NFL	NFC	North	1st	11	5	0	.688	Lost Divisional playoffs (Panthers) 21–29	Lovie Smith (COY); Brian Urlacher (DPOY)	Lovie Smith	
2006	2006	NFL	NFC	North	1st	13	3	0	.813	Won Divisional playoffs (Seahawks) 27–24 (OT); Won NFC Championship (Saints) 39–14; Lost Super Bowl XLI (vs. Colts) 17–29		Lovie Smith	
2007	2007	NFL	NFC	North	4th	7	9	0	.438			Lovie Smith	
2008	2008	NFL	NFC	North	2nd	9	7	0	.563			Lovie Smith	
2009	2009	NFL	NFC	North	3rd	7	9	0	.438			Lovie Smith	
2010	2010	NFL	NFC	North	1st	11	5	0	.688	Won Divisional playoffs (Seahawks) 35–24; Lost NFC Championship (Packers) 14–21		Lovie Smith	^{[g]}
2011	2011	NFL	NFC	North	3rd	8	8	0	.500			Lovie Smith	
2012	2012	NFL	NFC	North	3rd	10	6	0	.625			Lovie Smith	
2013	2013	NFL	NFC	North	2nd	8	8	0	.500		Charles Tillman (WP MOY)	Marc Trestman	
2014	2014	NFL	NFC	North	4th	5	11	0	.313			Marc Trestman	
2015	2015	NFL	NFC	North	4th	6	10	0	.375			John Fox	
2016	2016	NFL	NFC	North	4th	3	13	0	.188			John Fox	
2017	2017	NFL	NFC	North	4th	5	11	0	.313			John Fox	
2018	2018	NFL	NFC	North	1st	12	4	0	.750	Lost Wild Card playoffs (Eagles) 15–16	Matt Nagy (COY)	Matt Nagy	
2019	2019	NFL	NFC	North	3rd	8	8	0	.500			Matt Nagy	
2020	2020	NFL	NFC	North	2nd	8	8	0	.500	Lost Wild Card playoffs (at Saints) 9–21		Matt Nagy	
2021	2021	NFL	NFC	North	3rd	6	11	0	.353			Matt Nagy	
2022	2022	NFL	NFC	North	4th	3	14	0	.176			Matt Eberflus	
2023	2023	NFL	NFC	North	4th	7	10	0	.412			Matt Eberflus	
2024	2024	NFL	NFC	North	4th	5	12	0	.294			Matt Eberflus (4–8) Thomas Brown (1–4)	
2025	2025	NFL	NFC	North	1st	11	6	0	.647	Won Wild Card playoffs (Packers) 31–27; Lost Divisional playoffs (Rams) 17–20 (OT)	Joe Thuney (POTY)	Ben Johnson	
Totals						W	L	T	Pct				
Totals						10	1	2	.846	Decatur Staleys regular season record (1920)^{[q]}			
Totals						9	1	1	.864	Chicago Staleys regular season record (1921)^{[q]}			
Totals						790	650	39	.547	Chicago Bears regular season record (1922–present)^{[q]}			
Totals						809	652	42	.552	All-time regular season record (1920–present)^{[q]}			
Totals						18	21	—	.462	All-time postseason record (1933–present)^{[q]}			
Totals						827	673	42	.550	All-time regular season and postseason record (1920–present)^{[q]}			
Totals						9 NFL Championships, 4 Conference Championships, 20 Divisional Championships							

== Footnotes ==
- ^{a} No official standings were maintained for the 1920 season, and the championship was awarded to the Akron Pros in a League meeting on April 30, 1921. Teams played schedules that included games against nonleague opponents.
- ^{b} The NFL did not hold playoff games until 1933. The team that finished with the best regular season record was named the league champions.
- ^{c} The result of the 1932 NFL Playoff Game to determine the NFL champion between the Bears and the Portsmouth Spartans. The game counted in the standings and broke the tie.
- ^{d} The score of the playoff game is in parentheses with the winning score first no matter the outcome for the Bears.
- ^{e} The Bears were denied perfect seasons on two accounts. The first one was in the 1934 when the 13–0 Bears lost to the New York Giants in the Championship game. The second occurrence happened in 1942 when the 11–0 Bears were denied perfection and a "three-peat" by the Washington Redskins.
- ^{f} The Bears victory over the Redskins in the 1940 NFL Championship is an NFL record for greatest margin of victory and most points scored in a game.
- ^{h} The Bears tied with the Rams for 1st place at the end of the season, but they lost a one-game playoff tiebreaker and therefore did not win a Conference Championship.
- ^{i} The 1967 NFL season marks the first season in the league's history where the league was divided into two conferences which were subdivided into two divisions. Up to 1967, the league was either divided into two divisions, two conferences, or neither.
- ^{j} As a result of the AFL–NFL merger, the league was broken into two conferences, with the AFL teams moving into the American Football Conference.
- ^{k} As of the 2010 NFL season, this season marks the last tie game the Bears played. It was a game at Soldier Field on September 24, 1972, against the Los Angeles Rams. The game ended at 13–13.
- ^{l} The 1982 season was a strike-shortened season so the league was divided up into two conferences instead of its normal divisional alignment.
- ^{m} The Bears win in Super Bowl XX, marked the franchise's first Super Bowl victory and their ninth league championship.
- ^{n} The strike of 1987 reduced the regular season schedule from 16 to 15 games.
- ^{o} The Divisional Playoff game against the Eagles was known as the Fog Bowl due to the heavy fog that covered the field for most of the game.
- ^{p} As of the 2010 NFL season, this is the second postseason meeting of the Bears and Green Bay Packers in their longstanding rivalry.
