= List of Chicago Bears head coaches =

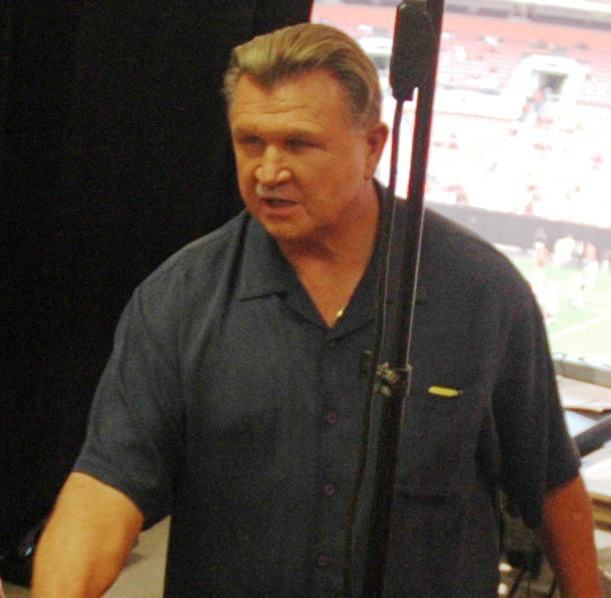
Mike Ditka was the head coach of the Bears from 1982 to 1992 and was elected into the Pro Football Hall of Fame in 1988.

There have been 18 head coaches for the Chicago Bears, including coaches for the Decatur Staleys (1919–1920) and Chicago Staleys (1921). The Bears franchise was founded as the Decatur Staleys, a charter member of the American Professional Football Association. The team moved to Chicago in 1921, and changed its name to the Bears in 1922, the same year the American Professional Football Association (APFA) changed its name to the National Football League (NFL).

The Chicago Bears have played more than 1,000 games. Of those games, five different coaches have won NFL championships with the team: George Halas in 1921, 1933, 1940, 1941, 1946 and 1963; Ralph Jones in 1932; Hunk Anderson and Luke Johnsos in 1943; and Mike Ditka in 1985. George Halas is the only coach to have more than one tenure and is the all-time leader in games coached and games won, while Ralph Jones leads all coaches in winning percentage with .706. Abe Gibron is statistically the worst coach of the Bears in terms of winning percentage, with a .268 average.

Of the 18 Bears coaches, three have been elected to the Pro Football Hall of Fame: George Halas, Paddy Driscoll, and Mike Ditka. Several former players have been head coach for the Bears, including George Halas, Hunk Anderson, Luke Johnsos, Paddy Driscoll, Jim Dooley, Abe Gibron and Mike Ditka.

After Ditka was fired following the 1992 season, the Bears went through six head coaches starting with Dave Wannstedt, who coached until 1998. Dick Jauron took over in 1999 until he was fired in 2003. Lovie Smith was hired on January 14, 2004. Smith was fired on December 31, 2012, after the Bears missed the playoffs with a 10–6 record after starting the season 7–1. On January 16, 2013, Marc Trestman was hired to be the new head coach to take Smith's place. Trestman was fired on December 29, 2014, with a 13–19 record over two seasons. On January 16, 2015, John Fox was hired as the new head coach of the team. He compiled a 14–34 record over three seasons before being fired on January 1, 2018. A week later, Matt Nagy became the new head coach. Nagy was fired after the 2021 season. Matt Eberflus was named the new head coach on January 27, 2022. After losing a sixth game in a row on Thanksgiving, November 28, 2024, Eberflus was fired and finished with a .304 winning percentage, the third worst in team history. Thomas Brown was named interim Head Coach for the remaining 5 games of the season. Ben Johnson was named the current head coach of the team on January 21, 2025.

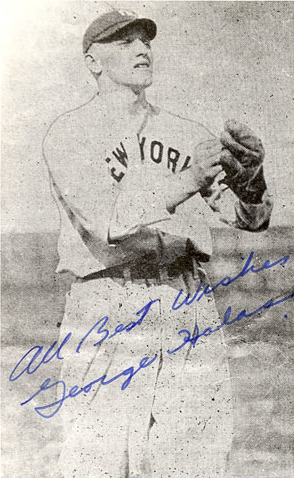
George Halas, founder of the Bears, shown here during his brief career with the New York Yankees in 1919

== Key ==
#	Number of coaches
GC	Games Coached
W	Wins
L	Loses
T	Ties
Win%	Winning percentage
–	Returning from previous year(s) of coaching
†	Elected into the Pro Football Hall of Fame as a coach
‡	Elected into the Pro Football Hall of Fame as a player
*	Spent entire NFL head coaching career with the Bears
§	Spent head coaching career in both CFL and NFL

== Coaches ==
Note: Statistics are accurate through the end of the 2024 NFL season.

Decatur Staleys
#^{[a]}	Image	Name	Term	Regular season					Playoffs			Achievements
#^{[a]}	Image	Name	Term	GC	W	L	T	Win%^{[b]}	GC	W	L	Achievements
(1)^{[a]}		Robert E. Brannan^{[c]}	1919	Not Available^{[d]}								Central Illinois Championship
Decatur Staleys/Chicago Staleys/Chicago Bears
1 (2)		George Halas^{[e]} †	1920–1929 *	134	84	31	19	.730	No postseason^{[f]}			NFL Championship (1921)
2 (3)		Ralph Jones *	1930–1932	41	24	10	7	.706	–	–	–	NFL Championship (1932)
–		George Halas^{[e]}†	1933–1942 *	110	84	22	4	.799	6	4	2	3× NFL Championships (1933, 1940–41)
3 (4)		Hunk Anderson^{[g]} *	1942–1945	36	23	11	2	.676	2	1	1	NFL Championship (1943)
4 (5)		Luke Johnsos^{[g]} *	1942–1945	36	23	11	2	.676	2	1	1	NFL Championship (1943)
–		George Halas^{[e]} †	1946–1955 *	119	75	42	2	.641	2	1	1	NFL Championship (1946)
5 (6)		Paddy Driscoll ‡	1956–1957	24	14	9	1	.609	1	0	1	
–		George Halas^{[e]} †	1958–1967 *	134	75	53	6	.588	1	1	0	NFL Championship (1963); AP Coach of the Year (1963, 1965); Sporting News Coach of the Year (1963, 1965); UPI NFL Coach of the Year (1963, 1965)
6 (7)		Jim Dooley *	1968–1971	56	20	36	0	.357	–	–	–	
7 (8)		Abe Gibron *	1972–1974	42	11	30	1	.268	–	–	–	
8 (9)		Jack Pardee	1975–1977	42	20	22	0	.476	1	0	1	UPI NFC Coach of the Year (1976)
9 (10)		Neill Armstrong *	1978–1981	64	30	34	0	.469	1	0	1	
10 (11)		Mike Ditka ‡	1982–1992	168	106	62	0	.631	12	6	6	Super Bowl Championship (1985); AP Coach of the Year (1985, 1988); Pro Football Weekly Coach of the Year (1988); Sporting News Coach of the Year (1985); UPI NFC Coach of the Year (1985, 1988)
11 (12)		Dave Wannstedt	1993–1998	96	40	56	0	.417	2	1	1	UPI NFC Coach of the Year (1994)
12 (13)		Dick Jauron	1999–2003	80	35	45	0	.438	1	0	1	AP Coach of the Year (2001); Pro Football Weekly Coach of the Year (2001); Sporting News Coach of the Year (2001)
13 (14)		Lovie Smith	2004–2012	144	81	63	0	.563	6	3	3	AP Coach of the Year (2005); Pro Football Weekly Coach of the Year (2005)
14 (15)		Marc Trestman §	2013–2014	32	13	19	0	.406				
15 (16)		John Fox	2015–2017	48	14	34	0	.291				
16 (17)		Matt Nagy*	2018–2021	65	34	31	0	.523	2	0	2	AP Coach of the Year (2018); PFWA Coach of the Year (2018)
17 (18)		Matt Eberflus*	2022–2024	46	14	32	0	.304				
18 (19)		Thomas Brown*	2024	5	1	4	0	.200				
19 (20)		Ben Johnson*	2025–present	17	11	6	0	.647	2	1	1	

== Footnotes ==
- ^{a} Official Chicago Bears record books list Halas as the first head coach in franchise history and therefore head coach Ben Johnson would be the 19th head coach in franchise history.
- ^{b} The winning percentage is calculated using the formula: $\frac{Wins+\frac{1}{2}Ties}{Games}$
- ^{c} Robert E. Brannan became the coach of the club when it was established by the A. E. Staley Company of Decatur, Illinois in 1919 as a company team.
- ^{d} No official records for the 1919 season in Chicago Bears record books, but the team finished the season 6–1.
- ^{e} Halas' full coaching record with the Bears is 497 regular season games coached with a record of 318–148–31 and a W–L percentage of .682. He is also 6–3 in 9 Playoff games.
- ^{f} The NFL did not hold playoff games until 1932.
- ^{g} Anderson and Johnsos were co-Head Coaches from 1942 to 1945. They were appointed by Halas when he left to serve in the US Navy.
- ^{h} Offensive coordinator Thomas Brown served as interim head coach for the final 5 games of the 2024 season.
