= Roy Adkins (American football) =

American football player (1898–1975)

No. 22
- Position: Guard

Personal information
- Born: October 5, 1898; Bement, Illinois, U.S.
- Died: February 10, 1975 (aged 76); Montclair, New Jersey, U.S.
- Listed height: 5 ft 7 in (1.70 m)
- Listed weight: 180 lb (82 kg)

Career information
- College: Bethany

Career history
- Decatur Staleys (1919-1920)

Career statistics
- Games played: 4
- Stats at Pro Football Reference

Roy S. Adkins (October 5, 1898 – February 10, 1975) was an American professional football player who played one season for the Decatur Staleys of the American Professional Football Association (APFA). Adkins played college football at Millikin University and Bethany College.

In 1917, Adkins enrolled at Millikin and started at right guard for the Millikin Big Blue. The following year, he served in the United States Army for a three-month stint (October 21–December 31) before returning to Millikin. In November 1919, he and teammate Sid Gepford joined the Staleys for their game against the Taylorville Independents; although they won, Millikin head coach Norman Wann was present and banned the two from playing for the Big Blue as they violated their amateur eligibility. The two remained with the Staleys in 1920; Adkins was already working part time for the team's A. E. Staley parent company to pay for college.

Adkins and Gepford later attended Bethany on the advice of a former Millikin line coach. Since Bethany did not care for amateur statuses, the two were also joined by former Staley teammates. Adkins graduated in 1924 and later became a high school coach and businessman.

His father Charles was a member of the United States House of Representatives.
