= Lennie High =

American football player (1895–1975)

No. 24
- Position: End

Personal information
- Born: February 17, 1895; Bement, Illinois, U.S.
- Died: November 16, 1975 (aged 80); Whittier, California, U.S.
- Listed height: 5 ft 11 in (1.80 m)
- Listed weight: 195 lb (88 kg)

Career information
- High school: Bement
- College: Eastern Illinois

Career history
- Decatur Staleys (1920)

Career NFL statistics
- Games played: 1
- Stats at Pro Football Reference

Lennie Leroy High (February 17, 1895 – November 16, 1975) was an American professional football end who played for the Decatur Staleys of the National Football League (NFL) during the 1920 season. He also worked as a federal agent during Prohibition and was a Japanese prisoner of war for 46 months after being captured at Wake Island in December 1941.

== Early life ==
High was born in 1895 and raised in Bement, Illinois. He attended Bement High School where he played three sports: football, basketball, and track.

== Football career ==
High enrolled at the Eastern Illinois State Normal School (now known as Eastern Illinois University) in 1914 or 1915. He played on the school's baseball team and played halfback for the football team.

High became a teacher in Piatt County, Illinois, in the fall of 1916. He also joined the Decatur Indians football team that fall, playing with Jack Mintun and Charlie Dressen.

In 1917, following the United States' entry into World War I, High entered the military and was sent to Love Field in Dallas, where he competed in a statewide track meet, winning the discus throw, tying for first in the pole vault, and finishing third in the 100-yards dash. He remained stationed in Texas during the war and was discharged in January 1919.

High later worked for A. E. Staley's factory in Decatur, Illinois, where he was assigned to the syrup house. He played for the Staley baseball team under Joe McGinnity and in September 1920 also joined the Staley football team that became the Chicago Bears. He played in the 1920 season opener as a substitute for George Halas at right end. The Staley in 1920 participated in first season the American Professional Football Association, now historically recognized as the first season of the National Football League. High later recalled, "It was quite a job to relieve Halas," who played about half the game. His teammates on the 1920 Staleys included Halas, Paddy Driscoll, George Trafton, Jimmy Conzelman, and Dutch Sternaman.

== Middle life ==
After his time at Staley, High worked as a plumber in Champaign, Illinois. He was also a federal agent assigned to investigate Prohibition violations until Prohibition was repealed in 1933. He moved to California in 1937 and worked as a payroll guard and later as a plumber doing work at California military bases.

== Prisoner of war ==
In 1941, High was sent to Wake Island as a civilian plumbing worker. When Japan invaded the island in December 1941, High became a prisoner of war. He spent two years as a prisoner in China and was later assigned to work as a welder's helper at a shipyard in Japan. He was a prisoner for 46 months and went from a weight of 200 pounds to 90 pounds at the end of the war. He later served as a delegate to a national convention of prisoners of war.

== Family and later life ==
High married Pauline Francis Desback in 1921. They had one child, Jane Elnore, born in 1921.

After World War II, High worked as a building and safety inspector in Los Angeles. High lived in his later years in Whittier, California. He returned to Illinois in 1956 to be honored at Wrigley Field in Chicago along with other members of the Staleys.

High died in 1975 at a hospital in Whittier. He was buried at the Monticello Township Cemetery in Piatt County, Illinois.
