= Sid Gepford =

American football player (1896–1924)

No. 6
- Position: Halfback

Personal information
- Born: December 15, 1896; Decatur, Illinois, U.S.
- Died: September 9, 1924 (aged 27); Marion, Illinois, U.S.
- Listed height: 5 ft 6 in (1.68 m)
- Listed weight: 152 lb (69 kg)

Career information
- High school: Decatur (IL) Stephen Decatur
- College: Millikin; Bethany

Career history
- Decatur Staleys (1919–1920)
- Stats at Pro Football Reference

Sidney "Sunshine" Gepford (December 15, 1896 – September 9, 1924) was an American professional football halfback who played one season in the American Professional Football Association (APFA) with the Decatur Staleys. He is considered one of the first APFA/NFL players to die, since the league's formation in 1920, and the first as a result of football-related head injuries.

== Early life ==
Gepford was born in Decatur, Illinois, the youngest child of Capitola (Knight) and John F. Gepford, the custodians of the Decatur Poor Farm.

== Football career ==
With the Millikin Big Blue of Millikin University., Gepford played halfback and quarterback for the football team whilst captaining and playing running guard for the basketball team. In November 1919, he and teammate Roy Adkins joined the Staleys for their game against the Taylorville Independents, which the Staleys won. However, the two were exposed by Millikin head coach Norman Wann and banned from Millikin athletics for violating their amateur athlete statuses, though they were allowed to remain in school. They permanently joined the Staleys for the remainder of the year and into 1920, with Gepford playing quarterback/halfback for the football team and was a member of the basketball team. He also worked for A. E. Staley in the summer.

In 1922, Gepford and Adkins enrolled at Bethany College on the advice of a former Millikin coach. As Bethany did not have rules regarding amateur eligibility, the two were also joined by players from the Staleys. During a 1923 game against Butler, Gepford suffered multiple concussions but continued to play. Due to the injury, he began experiencing headaches that persisted while he worked at Staley and prepared for his new job as athletic director and high school history teacher at Marion High School in Marion, Illinois. On September 9, 1924, he committed suicide by gunshot, which his mother attributed to his concussion (chronic traumatic encephalopathy).
