= Morgan O'Brien =

Morgan O'Brien may refer to:

- Morgan O'Brien (American football), American engineer and National Football League founder
- Morgan E. O'Brien (born 1944), American wireless telecommunications pioneer
- Morgan J. O'Brien (1852–1937), American lawyer and judge
