= Roy Adkins =

Roy Adkins may refer to:

- Roy Adkins (American football) (1898–1975), American football player
- Roy Adkins (author) (born 1951), English writer and archaeologist
- Roy Francis Adkins (1947–1990), London gangland figure
