= Monica Witni =

American composer (1918–1982)

Monica Witni Cassin (née Bowden; July 5, 1918 – September 7, 1982) was an American composer, pianist, playwright, and double bass player. She published music under the names Monica Witni, Monica Witni Cassin, and under the pseudonym Mirriam Bowden Henningfeld.

Witni was born in Fairfax, Minnesota. She began piano lessons at age six and studied with Jose Eschniz. She received scholarships to play double bass at Southern Illinois University and Millikin University in Decatur, Illinois. Witni taught briefly and played double bass in a jazz trio and with the Milwaukee Symphony Orchestra. She married James Cassin in 1953.

Witni died in Pomona, New York on September 7, 1982, at the age of 64.

Her compositions include:

== Ballet ==
- Zarea and the Purple Rainbow (1968)

== Chamber ==
- Dimensions in Rhythm (viola)
- March, Fantasia, and Fugue (organ)
- Modal Etude (viola; 1948)
- String Quartet in e minor (1969)
- Summer Holiday (viola)
- Sweet One (viola)
- Twilight Serenade (viola)

== Electronic ==
- Tapestry (English horn, harp, celeste, vibraphone, and double bass)

== Musical theatre ==
- Wizard (1964)

== Opera ==
- Children of the Sun (three acts; 1975)
- Dark of Summer (one act; 1967)
- El Pope (one act; 1950)

== Orchestra ==
- Organ Concerto in c minor (1948)
- Piano Concerto in f minor
- Rhapsody Petite (oboe and string orchestra)
- Symphony #1 (1947)
- Symphony #2 (1956)
- Symphony #5
- Tambores Subsurrantes
- Viola Concerto in c minor

== Play ==
- Black Camellia
- One of Us is Missing

== Song ==
- "I've Got to Face the Future" (with Jack Gould)
