= Brakes (company) =

British food distribution company

- Formerly: Brake Bros (1958-2002)
- Company type: Subsidiary
- Industry: Foodservice distribution and Logistics
- Founded: 1958; 68 years ago
- Founders: Frank Brake; Peter Brake; William Brake
- Headquarters: Ashford, Kent, United Kingdom
- Area served: Great Britain
- Key people: Paul Nieduszynski (CEO)
- Parent: Sysco
- Website: brake.co.uk

Brakes is a United Kingdom–based foodservice wholesaler and distributor. The company supplies food, beverages, and related products primarily to the catering industry through a network of more than 20 distribution centres. Founded in 1958 in Lenham, Kent, Brakes provides delivered wholesale and contract logistics services.

In 2002, the company formally shortened its brand name from Brake Bros to Brakes as part of a major rebranding initiative. Brake Bros Limited, the legal entity, became a subsidiary of Sysco Corporation on 5 July 2016 when the latter acquired it for $3.1 billion.

In February 2025, the company’s legal name was changed from Brake Bros Limited to Sysco GB Limited, while continuing to operate under the Brakes brand for its foodservice business.

Its main customers include local caterers, national restaurant groups and contract caterers. It also supplies specialist ranges for Italian restaurants, cafes, schools, hospitals, hotels, bakeries and more.

== Brakes ==
Brakes in GB comprises a number of businesses and brands:

- Brakes
- Country Choice
- Brakes Catering Equipment
- Sysco Premium, Sysco Classic, Sysco Essential
- La Boulangerie
- Portico Seafood
- Wholesome Farms

In addition to the head office in Enterprise Park, Ashford, the business has offices and customer care centres across the UK. They also maintain an office in Covent Garden, London, and a number of offices and distribution depots around the UK and France, including separate head offices for each division.

List of Brakes UK depots:

- Aylesford
- Bodelwyddan
- Bodmin
- Bridgend
- Brighton
- Dundee
- Durham
- Eastleigh
- Grantham
- Harlow
- Hemsworth
- Inverness
- Leeds
- Newark
- Newhouse
- Peterlee
- Portbury
- Premier Park
- Reading
- Tamworth
- Thetford
- Warrington

== Company history ==
2023	Brakes launches its own loyalty system: mybrakes rewards
2016	Sysco acquired Brakes
2007	Bain Capital acquired Brakes from Clayton, Dubilier & Rice.
2005	Brakes becomes partner in Nectar For Business a loyalty card for businesses
2004	Brakes opens its Food Innovation Centre in London Covent Garden - a first in foodservice the FIC is a place where Brakes presents its food and works on menu development to customers and is used for industry events. Brakes launches Prime Meats its specialist meat division offering complete transparency and traceability for the caterer. Brakes acquire Peters Foodservice Chilled Business Division and integrates it into the Brakes network. Brakes acquires Wild Harvest specialist supplier to fine dining establishments.
2002	Major rebranding took place. To project a strong, cohesive force within the food service industry, the business became known as Brakes. The company's major shareholders (the Brake family) decided to sell their shareholding and the business was subsequently sold to Clayton, Dubilier & Rice for a figure of £1.2 billion, an American investment company. Purchase of Pauleys, fresh fruit and vegetable supplier.
1999	Purchase of Cearns & Brown (an ambient supplier subsequently merged with Watson & Philip) and M&J Seafood (specialist seafood suppliers).
1998	Acquisition of Watson & Philip Foodservice (ambient & chilled grocery products).
1995	Purchase of Puritan Maid (contract distribution).
1992	The beginning of a prolonged period of growth and development. Acquisition of Country Choice (bakery). Launch of Larderfresh (chilled). First French company acquired. The purchase and consolidation of small French distributors continued over the next few years.
1991	The company was looking outside of its traditional frozen food market with a view to further expansion. Accordingly, the name was changed once again. Brake Bros Foodservice Ltd came into being on 12 March.
1986	To ensure sufficient investment to allow for continued growth, the company was floated on the stock exchange.
1977	The name of the company was changed to Brake Bros (Frozen Foods) Ltd on 1 July, to reflect the new direction.
1974	Poultry processing ceased as the decision was taken to expand the frozen food side of the business.
1969	With frozen food becoming more popular, the next logical step was to produce their own ready meals. The cooked food factory opened at Lenham producing multi-portion meals, mainly aimed at the pub market, as well as meat products such as burgers.
1963	Believing the freezing of food to be the way forward, the brothers began to distribute frozen foods alongside the main business of selling poultry.
1961	Brake Bros (Poultry Packers) Ltd was incorporated on 30 October. The business carried out poultry processing and packing, specialising in delivering poultry to caterers in Kent and London.
1958	Business established by William, Frank and Peter Brake supplying poultry to caterers. The brothers all had catering training and, being sons of licensees, had attended the LVS (Licensed Victuallers Society) School.

== Acquisitions ==
=== UK Acquisitions since flotation in November 1986 ===
Woodward Foodservice Ltd	September	2008
Peters Food services Ltd	November	2004
W Pauley & Co Limited	October	2002
Seafoodirect	August	2002
Scotia Campbell Marine Limited	October	2001
BertelloPeter	July	2001
Roach Frozen Foods	March	2001
Cearns & Brown Limited	July	2000
M&J Seafoods (Wholesale) Ltd	March	2000
Bayliss & Sons	August	1999
Watson & Philip Foodservice	October	1998
G R Tanner Co (Tanner Frozen Foods)	July	1997
Dairyfresh Desserts Limited	March	1997
Puritan Maid Limited	November	1995
P&B Fine Foods	October	1995
Woods Frozen Foods	March	1995
Runnymede Frozen Foods	July	1994
Jesse Robinson (Nottingham) Limited	February	1994
Country Choice Foods Group limited	May	1993
Bentley's Frozen Foods Limited	April	1993
Feathers Fresh 'n' Frozen Foods Limited	March	1993
Deben Valley Foods	June	1992
Anderson's Frozen Foods Limited	May	1992
Double A Foods	April	1992
Peterson's Food Co	March	1992
First Frozen Foods	March	1992
Everfresh Frozen Foods Limited	November	1991
London Larder Limited	September	1991
Peter Hooper Frozen Foods Limited	June	1991
Midfish Limited	March	1991
Rossfrost	November	1990
Peter Shaw Products	September	1990
Caterfrost	June	1990
Elmdale Foods Limited	May	1990
Spring Valley Foods Limited	December	1989
S H Wickett & Son Limited	October	1989
VJG Foods	April	1989
Cardigan Frozen Foods	February	1988
Scotia Frozen Foods Limited	November	1987
