= Robert E. Brannan =

American athlete and coach (1891–1958)

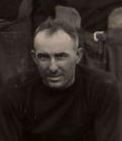
- Brannan in 1919

Biographical details
- Born: November 12, 1891; Timken, Kansas, U.S.
- Died: August 6, 1958 (aged 66); New York, New York, U.S.
- Education: Ottawa University (1915)

Playing career

Football
- 1912–1913: Ottawa (KS)

Basketball
- 1912–1915: Ottawa (KS)

Baseball
- 1910–1915: Ottawa (KS)

Coaching career (HC unless noted)

Football
- 1915–1916: Sioux Falls
- 1918: Millikin
- 1919: Decatur Staleys
- 1920–1922: Ottawa (KS)

Basketball
- 1918–1919: Millikin
- 1920–1922: Ottawa (KS)

Baseball
- 1919: Millikin

Head coaching record
- Overall: 37–12 (college basketball); 3–2 (college baseball)

Robert E. Brannan (November 12, 1891 – August 6, 1958) was an American football, basketball, and baseball player and coach. He was the first coach in Chicago Bears franchise history, running the team when they were known as the Decatur Staleys in 1919.

Brannan was hired as athletic coach at Sioux Falls College—now known as the University of Sioux Falls in 1915.

In 1920, Brannan became the head football coach at Ottawa University in Ottawa, Kansas, a position he held for three seasons until 1922. His coaching record at Ottawa was 4–19–1. According to football legend Walter Camp, the only bright spot for the team in the 1922 season was a guard named Swineheart who "played consistently" for the season. Brannan graduated from the Ottawa academy in 1911. He later graduated from Ottawa University in 1915, having earned fourteen letters in all university sports. Prior to coaching at Ottawa, he had coached at Sioux Falls, James Millikin University, and high schools near Decatur, Illinois.

After coaching, Brannan worked for what later became Union Carbide, Co. until he retired in 1956. He died at a hospital at New York City in 1958.

== Head coaching record ==
=== College football ===
Year	Team	Overall	Conference	Standing	Bowl/playoffs
Millikin Big Blue (Illinois Intercollegiate Athletic Conference) (1918)
1918	Millikin	4–1			
Millikin:		4–1			
Ottawa Braves (Kansas Collegiate Athletic Conference) (1920–1922)
1920	Ottawa	1–6	1–6	12th	
1921	Ottawa	3–5–1	2–5–1	T–11th	
1922	Ottawa	0–8	0–7	16th	
Ottawa:		4–19–1	3–18–1		
Total:					

=== Other ===
Team	Year	Regular season				
Team	Year	Won	Lost	Ties	Win %	Finish
Decatur Staleys	1919	6	1	0	.857	Named Central Illinois Champions
Total		6	1	0	.857	
