= WJMU =

- Decatur, Illinois; United States
- Broadcast area: Mount Zion, Illinois; Cerro Gordo, Illinois
- Frequency: 89.5 MHz
- Branding: The Quad

Programming
- Format: Alternative

Ownership
- Owner: Millikin University

History
- First air date: March 10, 1971
- Call sign meaning: James Millikin University

Technical information
- Licensing authority: FCC
- Facility ID: 42654
- Class: A
- ERP: 1,650 watts
- HAAT: 26.0 meters (85.3 ft)
- Transmitter coordinates: 39°50′30.00″N 88°58′29.00″W

Links
- Public license information: Public file; LMS
- Webcast: WJMU Live Player
- Website: millikin.edu/wjmu

WJMU (89.5 FM, "The Quad") is a radio station broadcasting an alternative music format. Licensed to Decatur, Illinois, United States, the station serves the Decatur area. The station is currently owned by Millikin University.

== Current student personnel ==
- Anna Peter – sports director (since 2022), show host/producer
- Cole Anderson – news director (since 2022), program director (since 2023), show host/producer
- AJ Hodge – promotions director (since 2025), show host/producer
- Hannah Uebinger – social media and online promotions director (since 2025), show host/producer

== Current faculty/community personnel ==
- Sam Meister – general manager, show host/producer
- Matt Sands – show host/producer
- Jeannie "Short Wheels" Martin – show host/producer
- Dr. Eduardo Cabrera – show host/producer
- Dr. Joel Blanco – show host/producer
- Dr. Scott Lambert – show host/producer
- Jamie Whitmer – show host/producer
- Frank Macaluso – producer
