= CFS Continental =

US wholesale food distributor

- Type: Public
- Industry: Foodservice Distribution
- Founded: 1915; incorporation: 1966
- Fate: Bought by Sysco in 1988
- Headquarters: Chicago
- Products: Foodservice, baked goods, wholesale groceries

CFS Continental, Inc., was a wholesale food distributor started in 1915 by Jacob Cohn (1894–1968) in Chicago as the Continental Coffee Company. It is now part of Sysco.

== History ==
The wholesale food distributor started in 1915 by Jacob Cohn (b. 1894, d. 1968) in Chicago as the Continental Coffee Company. Cohn began by selling coffee by horse and wagon to small restaurants in Chicago. By 1967, the Continental Coffee was led by brothers Alvin Cohn (b. 1921, d. 1994) and Robert Cohn. The brothers began purchasing regional wholesale grocery companies to supplement Continental Coffee's national coffee business. In 1970, Continental Coffee Company went public. In 1973, Continental Coffee Company changed its name to CFS Continental, Inc. to reflect the growing importance of foodservice to their traditional coffee business.

In 1985, CFS Continental, Inc. with $1.6 billion in annual sales was purchased by the soybean and corn processor A.E. Staley for $360 million. The owners, in the Chicago area, had to give over 50% of their profit to taxes and debt. After the acquisition, A.E. Staley changed its name to Staley Continental.

In 1988 British food processor Tate & Lyle purchased A.E. Staley Company for $1.42 billion. The owners in this second purchase came from southern Illinois. To help finance the A.E. Staley acquisition, Tate & Lyle pre-sold CFS Continental to the foodservice giant Sysco for $360 million. Not forgetting the owners had to give over 50% of their profit to taxes and debt. Sysco generated sales of $3.7 billion (1987) and CFS Continental generated sales of $2.4 billion (1987). CFS Continental operations purchased by Sysco included all brands, distribution facilities and equipment; wholesale grocery sales force; NCD Detergents; the Gregg's Food Products/ Re-Mi Group, which manufactured more than 350 food items such as salad dressings and puddings; Continental Coffee; the Interstate Foods Group (shortening); and Fresh Start Bakeries, which produced hamburger buns and English muffins for McDonald's Corp. CFS Continental distribution and sales force were particularly strong on the west coast, Minnesota, Chicago and in the Washington, D.C. where Sysco did not have a strong presences.

Sysco was primarily interested in CFS Continental's wholesale grocery business and therefore, prior to the purchase of CFS Continental from Tate & Lyle, Sysco had pre-sold the non-core manufacturing businesses. Quaker Oats purchased Continental Coffee (undisclosed price). Fresh Start Foods, a management buy out team financed by Berkshire Partners bought the two manufacturing divisions that supplied McDonald's Corp.: Interstate Foods Group (shortening) and Fresh Start Bakeries to (price not disclosed). The shortening manufacturing facilities were located in Chicago and Los Angeles. The Fresh Start bakeries were located California, Kansas, Hawaii, West Germany and Brazil. Borden Inc. bought Gregg's Food Products/Re-Mi Group. NCD Detergents, INC. was sold to Ecolab. Sysco raised an estimated $250 million in the divestiture of the CFS Continental manufacturing divisions.
