= Walt Veach =

American football player (1892–1976)

No. 15
- Position: Halfback

Personal information
- Born: September 29, 1892; Macon, Georgia, U.S.
- Died: February 24, 1976 (aged 83)
- Listed height: 5 ft 11 in (1.80 m)
- Listed weight: 180 lb (82 kg)

Career information
- College: none

Career history
- Decatur Staleys (1919–1920)

Career statistics
- Games played: 2
- Stats at Pro Football Reference

William Walter Veach (September 29, 1892 – February 24, 1976) was an American professional football halfback who played one season for the Decatur Staleys of the National Football League (NFL).
