= Jake Lanum =

American football player (1896–1968)

Profile
- Position: Running back

Personal information
- Born: September 13, 1896; Carmi, Illinois, U.S.
- Died: March 19, 1968 (aged 71); Homewood, Illinois, U.S.

Career information
- College: Illinois

Career history
- 1919-1924: Decatur Staleys / Chicago Staleys / Chicago Bears

Awards and highlights
- National Champion (1919)
- Stats at Pro Football Reference

Ralph Lewis "Jake" Lanum (September 13, 1896 – March 19, 1968) was an American professional football player who was a running back for five seasons for the Chicago Bears and its predecessors the Decatur Staleys and the Chicago Staleys.

Lanum was a starting fullback and also handled some kicking duties on the 1919 Illinois Fighting Illini football National Championship team.

After football, Lanum moved to Hammond, Indiana, working mostly in the oil industry. In retirement he returned to Illinois, living in Homewood, where he died in 1968 at the age of 71.
