= Mike Rowland (baseball) =

American baseball player (born 1953)

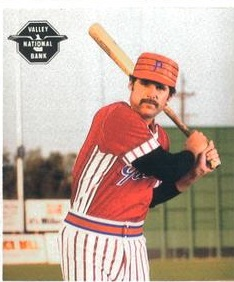
- Rowland with the Phoenix Giants.
- Pitcher
- Born: January 31, 1953 (age 73); Chicago, Illinois, U.S.
- Batted: Right Threw: Right

MLB debut
- July 25, 1980, for the San Francisco Giants

Last MLB appearance
- October 3, 1981, for the San Francisco Giants

MLB statistics
- Win–loss record: 1–2
- Earned run average: 2.74
- Strikeouts: 16
- Stats at Baseball Reference

Teams
- San Francisco Giants (1980–1981)

Michael Evan Rowland (born January 31, 1953) is an American former pitcher in Major League Baseball who played for the San Francisco Giants in parts of two seasons from 1980 to 1981. Listed at 6' 3", 205 lb., Rowland batted and threw right handed. He was born in Chicago, Illinois.

Rowland attended Millikin University in Decatur, Illinois, where he played for the Millikin Big Blue baseball team in 1975.

The Giants selected Rowland in the 22nd round of the 1975 MLB draft. He garnered popularity in his short stint as a Giants middle reliever through his trademark moustache and permed hair.

Rowland made 28 pitching appearances for the Giants (one start), going 1–2 with a 2.74 earned run average without saves. In addition, he hit a single and drove in a run in his only major league at-bat. Rowland is the only person in MLB with a career batting average of 1.000 and at least one RBI and at least 1 win and an ERA under 3.00.

Besides, Rowland posted a 64–78 record with a 4.28 ERA in eight Minor League seasons from 1975–1982, and also played winter ball with the Cardenales de Lara club of the Venezuelan League in its 1977-78 season.

Afterwards, Rowland gained induction into the Millikin University Athletics Hall of Fame as part of their 1984 Class.
