= Walt May =

American football player (Otto A. May; 1898–1972)

No. 19
- Position: Guard

Personal information
- Born: February 8, 1898; Taylorville, Illinois, U.S.
- Died: June 26, 1972 (aged 74); Chicago, Illinois, U.S.
- Listed height: 6 ft 1 in (1.85 m)
- Listed weight: 205 lb (93 kg)

Career information
- High school: Taylorville
- College: none

Career history
- Decatur Staleys (1919-1920)

Career statistics
- Games played: 4
- Stats at Pro Football Reference

Otto A. May (February 8, 1898 – June 26, 1972) known professionally as Walt May, was an American professional football guard who played one season for the Decatur Staleys in the American Professional Football Association (APFA). He attended and played football at Taylorville High School.

May and his brother Orel "Red" May played for the Taylorville Independents before joining the Staleys' works team in 1919.
