= Staley Field =

Sporting venue in the United States

- Interactive map of Staley Field
- Location: 521 North 7th (now 22nd) Street; Decatur, Illinois, United States
- Coordinates: 39°50′48″N 88°55′35″W
- Owner: A. E. Staley Company
- Capacity: 1,500
- Surface: Grass

Tenants
- Decatur Staleys (APFA) (1920); Decatur Commodores (IIIL) (1901–1915)

Contemporary postcard showing Staley field with the A.E. Staley starchworks in the distance.

Staley Field in Decatur, Illinois, United States, was the home of the Decatur Staleys club of the American Professional Football Association in 1920, coached and managed by the young George Halas, who also played for the team.

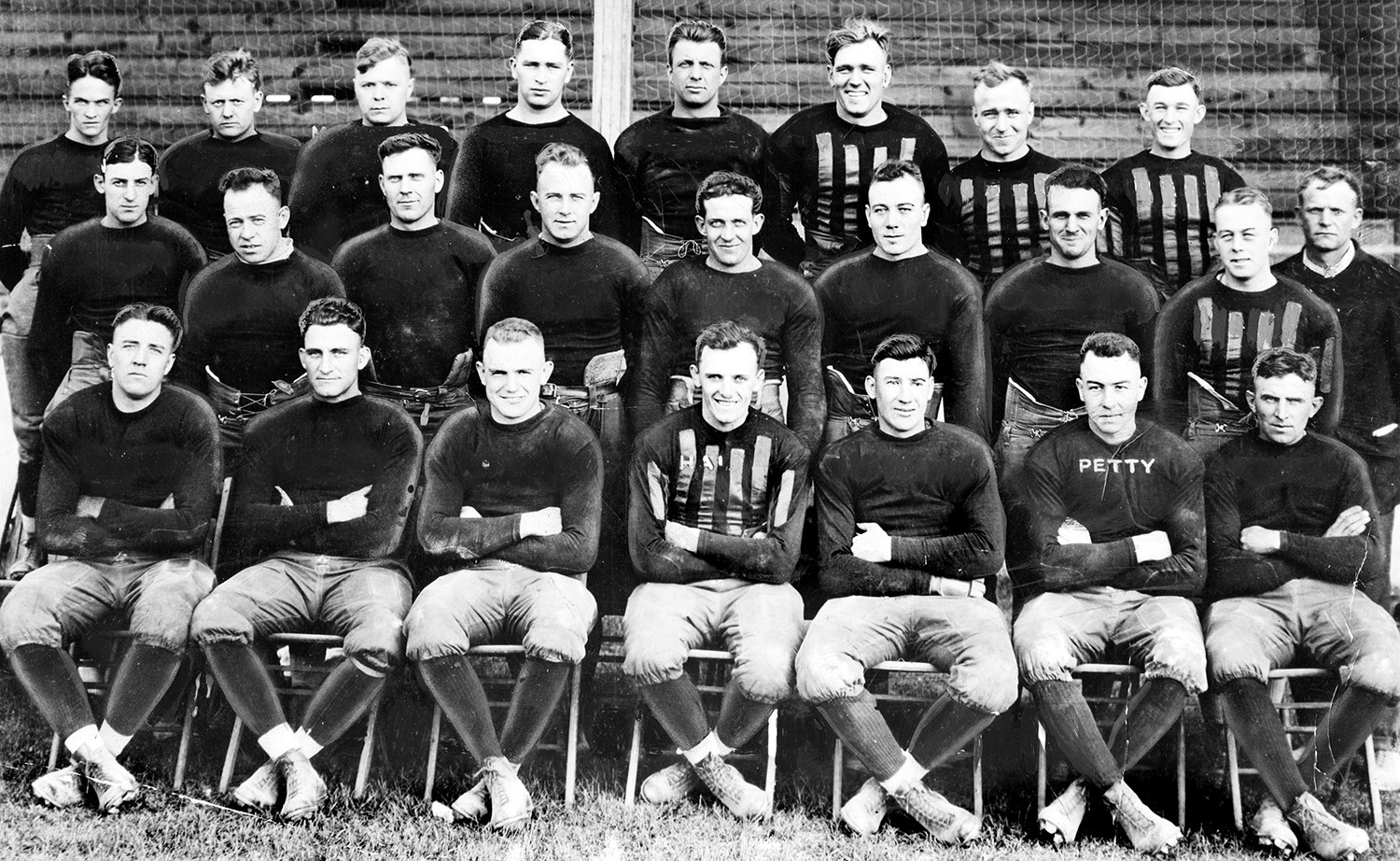
Decatur Staleys, 1920

The team was owned by the A. E. Staley Manufacturing Company, for which Staley Field was the company athletic field.

Staley Field was also used by the company baseball team during the summer months, and Halas also played on that team. The field was also used by the Decatur entry in the Three-I League in 1915 and 1922–23.

Although the Staley football team was popular in 1920, it struggled financially, partly due to Staley Field's 1,500 seating capacity. Fans were charged $1 to attend games and company employees received a 50 percent discount, which was not economically feasible for the Staleys and prompted Halas to move games to Cubs Park (now Wrigley Field) in Chicago.

The Staley company sold the team to Halas and his partners, who transferred the team to Cubs Park in 1921. As part of the deal, they operated under the "Staley" name for one more season. They proceeded to win the APFA championship that season. For 1922, they renamed themselves the Chicago Bears in order to associate themselves with their landlords.

== Location ==
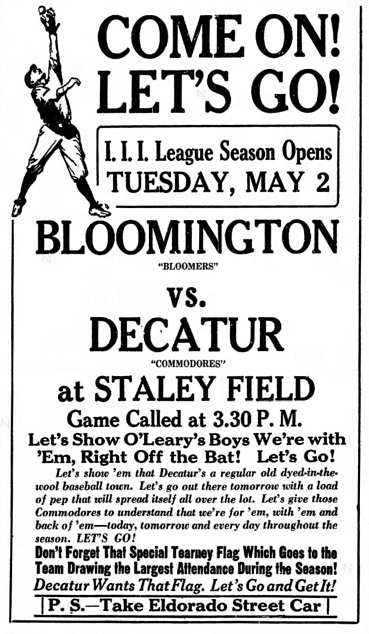
Minor league baseball ad, 1922

Michael Benson's Ballparks of North America locates the field at Eldorado and 22nd Streets. In fact, the Staley company's own address was 2200 East Eldorado Street. City directories and maps pinpoint the location more precisely, and the external link to the aerial photo places it in relation to the factory complex.

The 1921 city directory gives the location of "Staley Athletic Field" as "North 7th corner Wabash". Wabash, which was the second street north of Eldorado, teed into 7th from the east. The directory shows both A E Staley Mfg Co. and Staley Athletic Field on North Seventh Street. The next entity north is the Wabash Railroad shops. 7th ran along the east edge of the plant, and has since been renumbered to 25th Street. The Wabash Railroad tracks ran along the north edge of the plant, with the shops on the other side of the tracks. The eventual 22nd Street ran along the west edge of the plant.

The 1922 city directory gives the address of Staley Field as 521 North 7th. The 1927 directory says Eldorado corner 7th. By 1929, 7th has become 22nd and Staley Field is no longer listed.

As the data and the photograph indicate, Staley Field was on the east side of 7th (now 22nd), a short distance north of Eldorado. Home plate was in the southeast corner. The third base line paralleled Eldorado, and left field bordered 7th. Right field was a couple of block south of the railroad tracks.

Preceded by first stadium	Home of the Chicago Bears; 1920	Succeeded by Wrigley Field
