= Morgan O'Brien (American football) =

American football engineer and football executive

Morgan P. O'Brien was an engineer at the A. E. Staley Company, located in Decatur, Illinois, as well as a football fan who assisted George Halas in managing the administrative matters of the Decatur Staleys (renamed the Chicago Bears in 1922). In the fall of 1920, O'Brien and Halas traveled to Canton, Ohio via train to attend and represent Decatur at a meeting held at Ralph Hay's Hupmobile dealership, which would establish the American Professional Football Association (renamed the National Football League in 1922).

At the league's 1921 meeting, O'Brien was named as the vice-president of the Association.

== See also ==
- Peterson, Robert W. (1997). Pigskin: The Early Years of Pro Football. Oxford University Press. ISBN 0-19-511913-4.
