= Lori Kerans =

American basketball coach

- Born: Lori Kerans; September 1, 1963 (age 62); Newton, Illinois
- Occupation: VP of Athletics at Millikin University
- Known for: Coaching Women’s Basketball at Millikin University

Lori Kerans was the head women's basketball coach at Millikin University for 32 years. In those 32 years she achieved 11 Conference Titles over 500 career wins and a national championship in 2005. She now is retired from coaching and works at Millikin University in the office of admissions and has been in her position as the director of community engagement and recruitment since 2022, after working as the director of major gifts in the alumni department since her retirement from coaching in 2017. Lori Kerans has been Millikin University's Women's Basketball head coach since 1986. In 2013, she celebrated her 500th career win. Her teams were in Division 3 NCAA playoffs eleven times and won the 2005 NCAA Division III national championship.
