= Staley Da Bear =

Mascot for the NFL's Chicago Bears

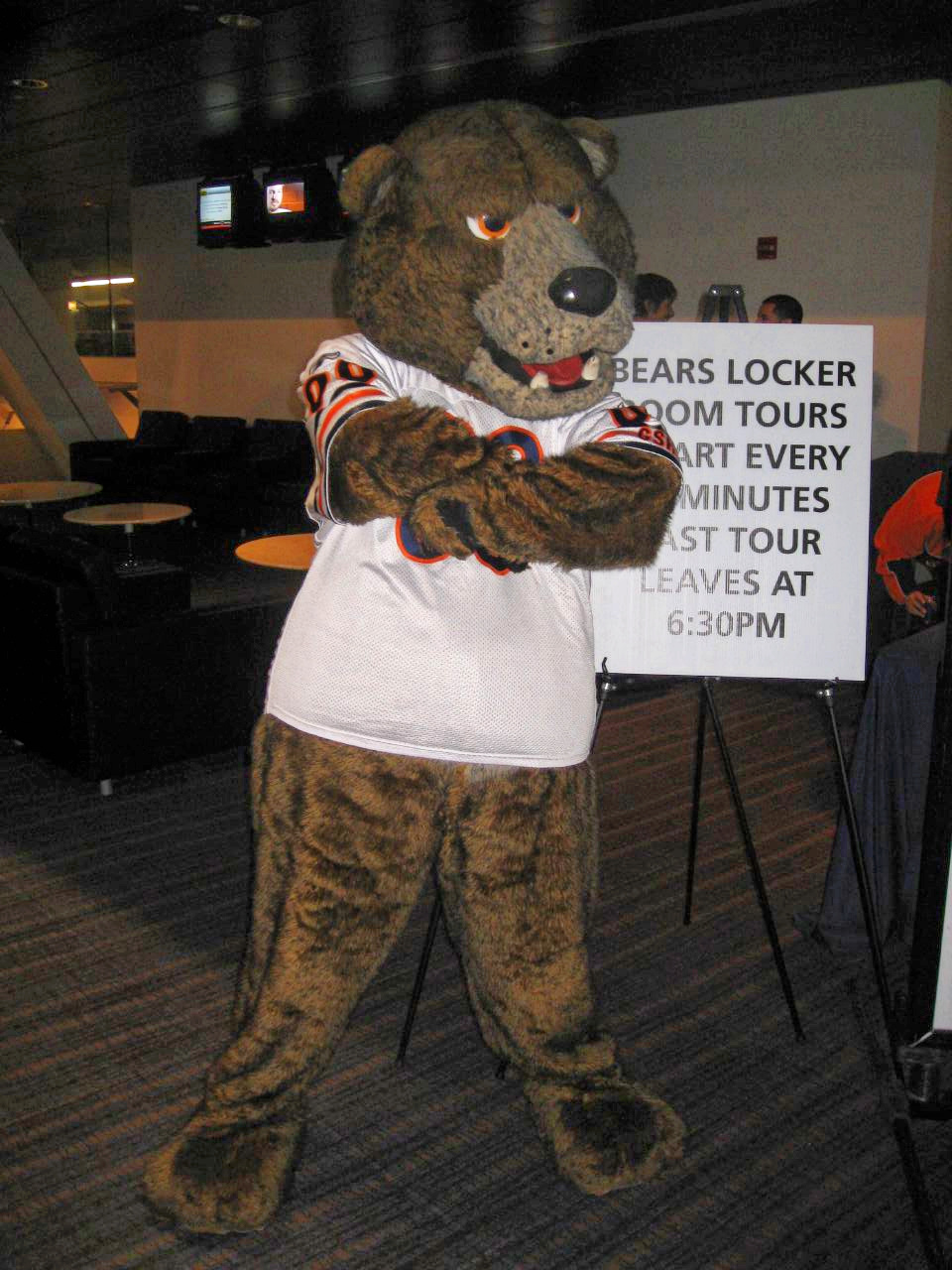
Staley Da Bear, October 28, 2008.

Staley Da Bear is the official mascot of the Chicago Bears of the National Football League. He is an anthropomorphic bear with a customized team jersey. Staley's name is eponymous to A. E. Staley, the founder of the Bears franchise. His title, "Da Bear," is a reference to "Da Bears!," a catchphrase said in "Bill Swerski's Superfans" sketches on Saturday Night Live.

Staley debuted in 2003 to entertain fans at Soldier Field. He has since participated in many charity events, parties, Chicago Rush games, and other Bears-related events such as annual holiday parties. He has also appeared in the Elmhurst St. Patrick's Day Parade, participated in Halloween events with other NFL mascots, and visits area schools to promote and participate in anti-bullying assemblies and programs.

Staley has also made numerous cameos on television, especially during the team's Super Bowl run in 2006. Through 2007, Staley's winning percentage with the Bears is .537. He was named a three-time Pro Bowl mascot in 2004, 2006, and 2007. At halftime, Staley and his "furballs" (NFL mascots and various other mascots) would take on a group of youth players from Naperville.
