= Jack Mintun =

American football player (1894–1976)

Profile
- Position: Center

Personal information
- Born: July 12, 1894; Cisco, Illinois, U.S.
- Died: February 25, 1976 (aged 81); Decatur, Illinois, U.S.
- Listed height: 5 ft 11 in (1.80 m)
- Listed weight: 191 lb (87 kg)

Career information
- High school: Cambridge (NE)
- College: none

Career history
- Decatur/Chicago Staleys (1919–1921); Racine Legion (1922–1924); Kansas City Cowboys (1925); Racine Tornadoes (1926)

Career statistics
- Games played: 45
- Games started: 38
- Stats at Pro Football Reference

John Theodore Mintun (July 12, 1894 – February 25, 1976) was professional American football player who played as a center for seven seasons for the Decatur/Chicago Staleys (1920–1921), the Racine Legion (1922–1924), the Kansas City Cowboys (1925), and the Racine Tornadoes (1926).

Mintun grew up in Piatt County, Illinois before moving to Decatur as a teenager, where he played for the independent Decatur Indians team; during a November 1915 game, he received the nickname "Jack" from a local newspaper. He later joined A. E. Staley's baseball team before being drafted into the United States Army in 1918; he served with the 34th Infantry Division in France until his discharge. In 1919, he was a member of Staley's new football team, where he played center and kicker. He scored three touchdowns for the Staleys that year on an interception return, muffed punt return, and a fumble return. The following year, he became an employee at A. E. Staley as a millwright, and was named their night supervisor in 1932.
