= Norman G. Wann =

American football, basketball and baseball coach

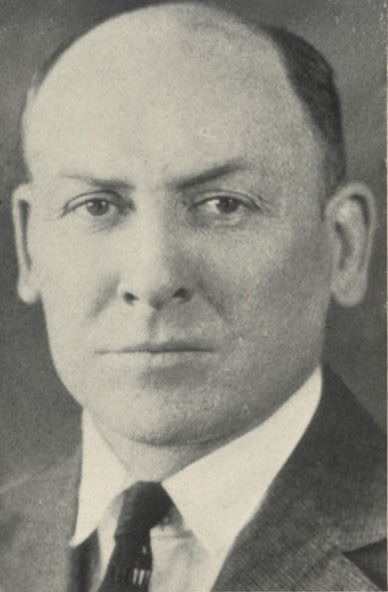
- Wann pictured in Orient 1928, Ball State yearbook

Biographical details
- Born: July 8, 1882; Silverwood, Indiana, U.S.
- Died: July 23, 1957 (aged 75); Eagle Harbor Township, Michigan, U.S.

Playing career

Football
- c. 1905: Earlham
- Position: Lineman

Coaching career (HC unless noted)

Football
- 1908–1909: Ottawa (KS)
- 1915–1917: Millikin
- 1919–1922: Millikin
- 1923–1924: Earlham
- 1925: Muncie Normal (assistant)
- 1926–1927: Muncie Normal / Ball Teachers
- 1929–1931: Detroit City College

Basketball
- 1908–1910: Ottawa (KS)
- 1915–1918: Millikin
- 1919–1923: Millikin
- 1923–1925: Earlham

Baseball
- 1909–1910: Ottawa (KS)
- 1916–1918: Millikin
- 1920–1921: Millikin
- 1927: Ball Teachers

Tennis
- 1932–1953: Detroit City College / Wayne

Head coaching record
- Overall: 74–40–10 (football); 128–79 (basketball); 43–39 (baseball)

Accomplishments and honors

Championships
- Football; 3 IIAC (1916, 1919, 1920); 1 MWC (1922)

Norman Gillespie "Happy" Wann (July 8, 1882 – July 23, 1957) was an American college football player, track athlete, coach of multiple sports, and college athletics administrator. He served as the head football coach at Ottawa University in Ottawa, Kansas (1908–1909), Millikin College (1915–1917, 1919–1922), Earlham College (1923–1924), Ball Teachers College, Eastern Division, Indiana State Normal School—now Ball State University (1926–1927), and the College of the City of Detroit—now Wayne State University (1929–1931), compiling a career college football head coaching record of 74–40–10. Wann was also the head basketball coach at Ottawa (1908–1910), Millikin (1915–1918, 1919–1923), and Earlham (1923–1925), amassing a career college basketball record of 128–79. In addition, he was the head baseball coach at Ottawa (1909–1910), Millikin (1916–1918, 1920–1921), Ball Teachers College (1927), tallying a career college baseball mark of 43–39.

Wann attended Earlham College, where he played football as a lineman and ran track. He left campus in 1908 one credit short of his BBS degree, which he did not receive until 1922. Earlham served with the American Expeditionary Forces in Europe during World War I. In 1929, he earned a master's degree in physical education from the University of Wisconsin. After his retirement from coaching, he moved to Eagle Harbor Township, Michigan. He died there on July 23, 1957. Three years earlier, in 1954, he was inducted into Earlham's Athletic Hall of Fame. In 1986, he was inducted into the Wayne State University Athletics Hall of Fame.

== Head coaching record ==
=== Football ===
| Year | Team | Overall | Conference | Standing | Bowl/playoffs |
|---|---|---|---|---|---|
Ottawa Braves (Kansas Collegiate Athletic Conference) (1908–1909)
| 1908 | Ottawa | 3–4 | | | |
| 1909 | Ottawa | 6–1–1 | | | |
| Ottawa: | | 9–5–1 | | | |
Millikin Big Blue (Interstate Intercollegiate Athletic Conference) (1915–1917)
| 1915 | Millikin | 5–2–1 | | | |
| 1916 | Millikin | 8–0–1 | | 1st | |
| 1917 | Millikin | 7–1 | | | |
Millikin Big Blue (Illinois Intercollegiate Athletic Conference) (1919–1921)
| 1919 | Millikin | 9–0 | | 1st | |
| 1920 | Millikin | 9–0 | | T–1st | |
| 1921 | Millikin | 5–2–1 | | | |
Millikin Big Blue (Illinois Intercollegiate Athletic Conference / Midwest Conference) (1922)
| 1922 | Millikin | 3–4–2 | 2–2–1 / 1–0 | T–9th / T–1st | |
| Millikin: | | 47–9–5 | | | |
Earlham Quakers (Independent) (1923–1924)
| 1923 | Earlham | 2–5 | | | |
| 1924 | Earlham | 4–3–1 | | | |
| Earlham: | | 6–8–1 | | | |
Muncie Normal / Ball Teachers Hoosieroons (Independent) (1926–1927)
| 1926 | Muncie Normal | 5–1–1 | | | |
| 1927 | Ball Teachers | 5–2–1 | | | |
| Muncie Normal / Ball Teachers: | | 10–3–2 | | | |
Detroit City College Tartars (Michigan Collegiate Conference) (1929–1930)
| 1929 | Detroit City College | 2–7 | 1–2 | 3rd | |
| 1930 | Detroit City College | 0–9 | 0–3 | 4th | |
Detroit City College Tartars (Independent) (1931)
| 1931 | Detroit City College | 0–6–1 | | | |
| Detroit City College: | | 2–15–1 | 1–5 | | |
| Total: | | 74–40–10 | | | |
National championship Conference title Conference division title or championship game berth
