= Millikin Big Blue =

Athletic programs of Millikin University

- University: Millikin University
- Nickname: Big Blue
- NCAA: Division III
- Conference: College Conference of Illinois and Wisconsin
- Athletic director: Lori Kerans
- Location: Decatur, Illinois
- Varsity teams: 23 (12 men's and 11 women's)
- Football stadium: Frank M. Lindsay Field
- Basketball arena: Griswold Center
- Baseball stadium: Workman Family Baseball Field
- Softball stadium: Workman Family Softball Field
- Soccer stadium: Frank M. Lindsay Field
- Other venues: Decatur Indoor Sports Center; Fairview Park Tennis Complex
- Colors: Blue and White
- Website: athletics.millikin.edu

The Millikin Big Blue are the intercollegiate athletic programs of Millikin University (MU) located in Decatur, Illinois, United States. The Big Blue athletic program is a member of the College Conference of Illinois and Wisconsin (CCIW) and competes at the NCAA Division III level.

== History ==
Millikin University was a member of the National Association of Intercollegiate Athletics (NAIA). Its athletics programs were established together with the university in 1903, with football, men's basketball and baseball all competing in the university's first full academic year (1903–04). Since its start, Big Blue athletics has achieved considerable success both as a member of the College Conference of Illinois and Wisconsin (CCIW) and at the national level as a member of the NCAA Division III. The nickname "Big Blue" is generally attributed to Carl Head, a professor of mechanical engineering who used the name on posters during the 1916 football season. Millikin joined the College Conference of Illinois (CCI) on April 26, 1946 as one of its nine charter members (Augustana, Carthage, Elmhurst, Illinois College, Illinois Wesleyan, Lake Forest, Millikin, North Central and Wheaton). The league was renamed the CCIW in 1967 to recognize Carthage, which had moved its campus from Illinois to Wisconsin as well as Carroll's entrance in 1955. Regarded as "The Best Small College Conference In The Nation", Millikin is one of four charter members with uninterrupted membership. One of the school's most famous alumni is former NFL wide receiver Jeff Query who played for the Green Bay Packers, Cincinnati Bengals and Washington Redskins.

== Sports sponsored ==
Men's sports	Women's sports
Baseball	Basketball
Basketball	Cross country
Cross country	Flag football (2026–27)
Football	Golf
Golf	Soccer
Soccer	Softball
Swimming & diving	Swimming & diving
Tennis	Tennis
Track and field^{†}	Track and field^{†}
Volleyball	Triathlon
Wrestling	Volleyball
	Wrestling (2026–27)
† – Track and field includes both indoor and outdoor

A member of the College Conference of Illinois and Wisconsin, Millikin University sponsors teams in twelve men's and eleven women's NCAA sanctioned sports.

Millikin will add two women's sports in 2026–27—flag football and wrestling. At the time of announcement (September 2025), flag football was not sanctioned by the NCAA; it became part of the NCAA Emerging Sports for Women program in January 2026. Wrestling was promoted from the Emerging Sports program to full championship status in January 2025, with the first NCAA championship taking place in 2025–26.

== National championships ==
=== Team ===
- 2004–05: Women's Basketball

=== Individual ===
==== Men's wrestling ====
- Bradan Birt - 165 wc. (2021-22)

==== Men's swimming ====
- Rodney Miller – 200 yd. breast (1985–86, 1986–87, 1987–88)
- Rodney Miller – 100 yd. breast (1986–87, 1987–88)
- Rodney Miller – 200 yd. IM (1987–88)
- Scott Walker – 100 fly (1990–91)

==== Men's track & field ====
- Carl Alexander – Outdoor 100-meter dash (1997–98)
- Kyle Hensley – Indoor Pole Vault (2024)

== Notable former athletes ==
- George Corbett – football player: Chicago Bears running back from 1932 to 1938
- Sid Gepford – NFL player in 1920
- Lori Kerans – basketball coach, gave Millikin their first NCAA Division III national championship win; coached from 1985 to 2018
- Fred T. Long – Negro league baseball player and college football coach: played four seasons in Negro National League and amassed a 227–151–31 coaching record from 1921 to 1965 at various colleges including three Black college football national championships (1928, 1932, 1945)
- Harry Long – college football coach, won a Black college football national championship in 1924 as coach of Paul Quinn College; assistant coach to his brother Fred for his 1932 and 1945 championships
- Chuck Martin – football head coach at Miami of Ohio; former coach of Grand Valley State, where he won back-to-back NCAA Division II national championships
- Danny Moeller – Major League Baseball player, 1907–1916, with Pittsburgh Pirates and Washington Senators
- Jeff Monken – football head coach at United States Military Academy
- Marcia Morey – swimmer at Montreal Olympic Games in 1976 in women's 100m breaststroke and 200m breaststroke; former American record holder in 200M Breaststroke
- George Musso – football player: Chicago Bears lineman from 1933 to 1944; nine-year team captain, elected to the Pro Football Hall of Fame in 1982
- Jeff Query – football player: former Green Bay Packers and Cincinnati Bengals wide receiver; 141 receptions for 1,865 yards and 11 touchdowns in 84 career games.
- Mike Rowland – pitcher for San Francisco Giants, 1980–1981
- Don Shroyer – college football coach at Millikin and Southern Illinois
- Virgil Wagner – Canadian Football League player, Montreal Alouettes halfback from 1946 to 1954; elected to Canadian Football Hall of Fame in 1980
- Art Wilson – Major League Baseball player
