= Millikin University =

Private university in Decatur, Illinois, US

- Former names: Decatur College and Industrial School of the James Millikin University (1901–1953)
- Motto: In His Plenitudo Vis (In These, the Fullness of Strength)
- Type: Private university
- Established: 1901; 125 years ago
- Accreditation: HLC
- Religious affiliation: P.C.U.S.A. (historically)
- Endowment: $94.3 million (2020)
- President: Dean Pribbenow
- Academic staff: 235 (full and part–time)
- Total staff: 1,393 (full and part-time)
- Students: 1,587 (fall 2024)
- Undergraduates: 1,496 (fall 2024)
- Postgraduates: 91 (fall 2024)
- Location: Decatur, Illinois, US; 39°50′33″N 88°58′30″W
- Campus: City, 75 acres (30.3 ha)
- Colors: Blue and white
- Nickname: Big Blue
- Sporting affiliations: NCAA Division III – CCIW
- Website: www.millikin.edu
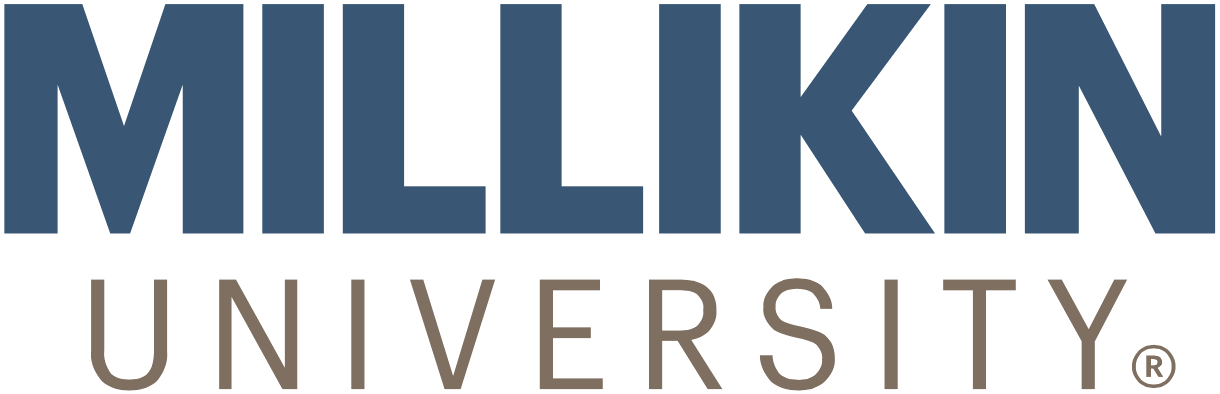

Millikin University is a private university in Decatur, Illinois, United States. It was founded in 1901 by Decatur businessman James Millikin and is historically affiliated with the Presbyterian Church (USA).

== History ==
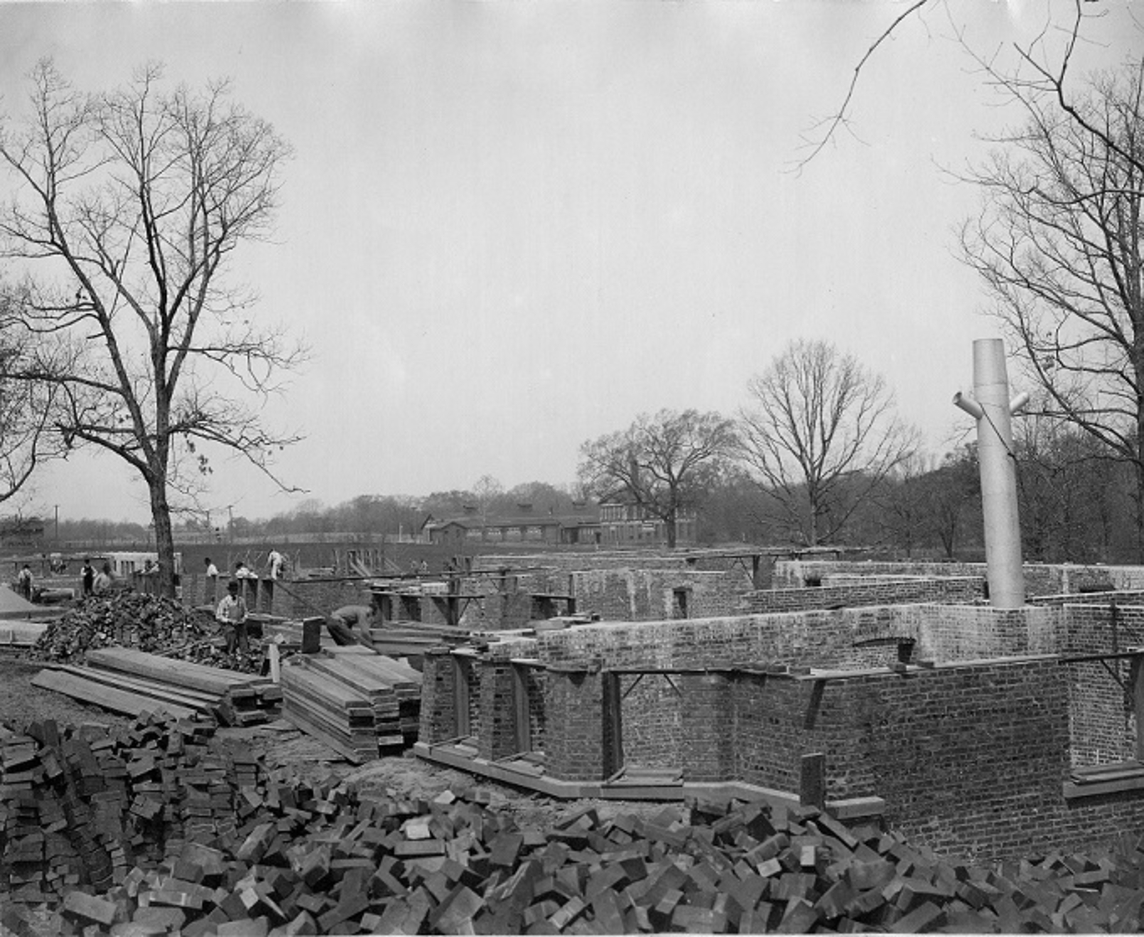
Shilling Hall under construction in 1902.

Millikin was initially established on April 30, 1901, through a partnership with the then-Lincoln University, an existing college in Lincoln, Illinois also affiliated with the Cumberland Presbyterian Church. At this time, the charter for Lincoln University, which had been in existence since February 1865, was modified to create a new overarching university, the James Millikin University. This new institution had two subsidiary units: Lincoln College, the newly renamed, Lincoln-based campus formerly known as Lincoln University, and the Decatur College and Industrial School, a new campus to be established in Decatur. This arrangement leveraged the existing resources of Lincoln University to establish a wholly new college in Decatur. The combined, two-campus institution took the name of its primary advocate, James Millikin.

Millikin's campus in Decatur, however, would not officially open until September 15, 1903. Its dedication was presided over by U.S. President Theodore Roosevelt. James Millikin University maintained its two-campus model until 1952, when the two units separated to become two wholly independent institutions; the Decatur campus was renamed to Millikin University while the Lincoln campus remained known as Lincoln College. The charter of independent Millikin was approved by the state on July 23, 1953.

== Academics ==
Millikin confers undergraduate degrees, graduate degrees, and post-graduate certificates and degrees. Its most popular undergraduate majors, based on number out of 403 graduates in 2022, were:

- Registered Nursing/Registered Nurse (55)
- Musical Theatre (31)
- Business Administration and Management (28)
- Drama and Dramatics/Theatre Arts (27)
- Biology/Biological Sciences (25)

=== Undergraduate admissions ===
In 2024, Millikin University accepted 75.4% of undergraduate applicants, with admission standards considered moderate, applicant competition considered very low, and with those enrolled having an average 3.4 high school GPA. The university does not require submission of standardized test scores, but they will be considered when submitted. Those enrolled that submitted test scores had an average 1070 SAT score (31% submitting scores) or an average 23 ACT score (14% submitting scores).

=== Rankings ===
In 2025, U.S. News & World Report ranked Millikin University tied for No.14 out of 94 schools in "Regional Colleges Midwest", No.22 in Best Value Schools, and tied for No.44 in Top Performers on Social Mobility, noting that the university had a student-faculty ratio of 10:1, 74.5% of classes had fewer than 20 students, had an average freshman retention rate, an indicator of student satisfaction, of 71%, and that the university considered a student's GPA an important academic factor with an applicant's high school class rank and letters of recommendation considered.

In 2024, Washington Monthly ranked Millikin University 45th among 223 colleges that award almost exclusively bachelor's degrees in the U.S. based on its contribution to the public good, as measured by social mobility, research, and promoting public service.

== Media ==
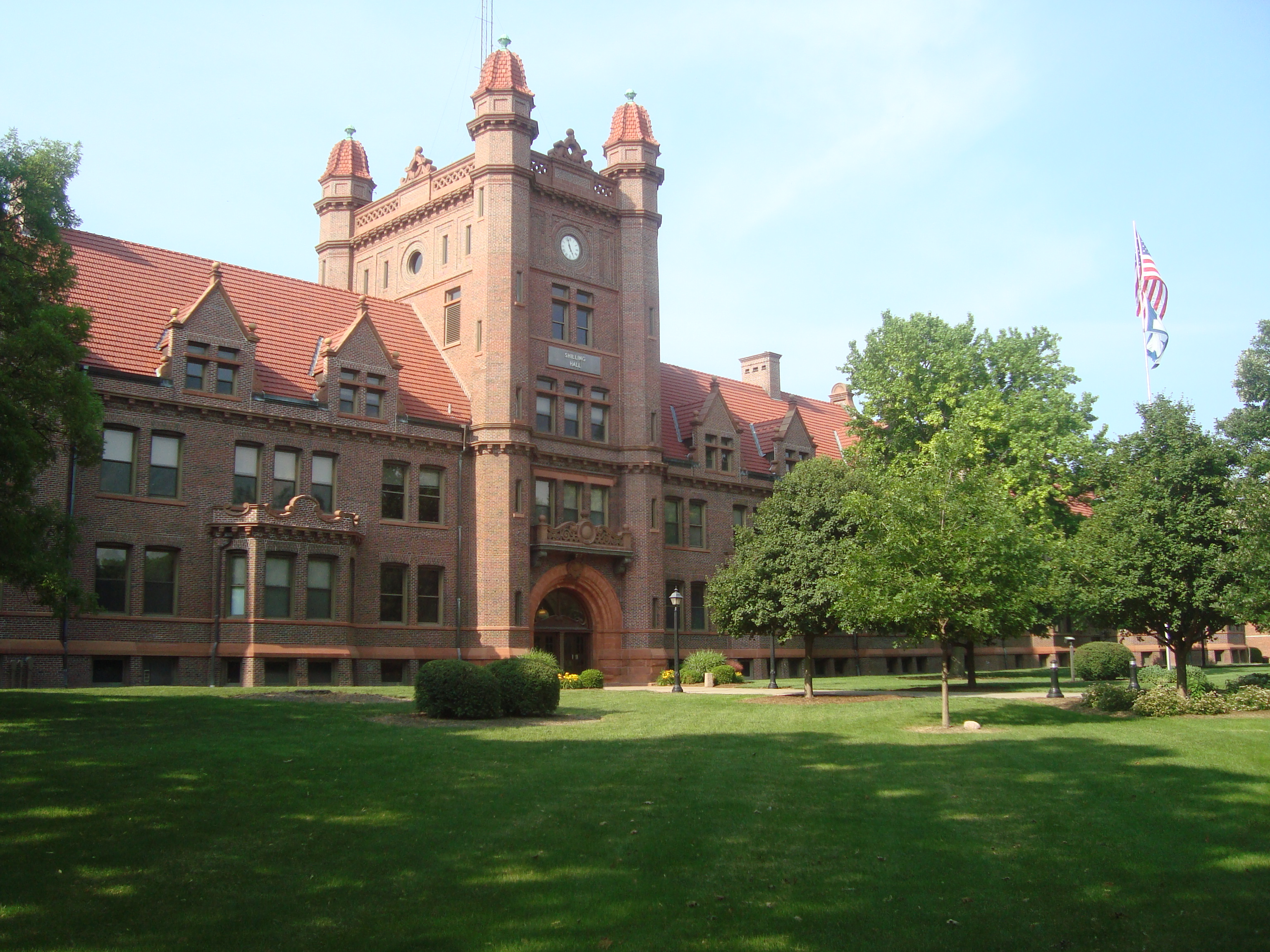
Shilling Hall

=== Decaturian ===
The Decaturian is the bi-weekly student newspaper. Its first issue appeared in 1903; issues up to 1951 are archived online.

=== WJMU 89.5 The Quad ===
WJMU is Millikin University's student-operated freeform format radio station. In addition to its musical responsibilities, WJMU also creates its own public service announcements, liners, news, Millikin sports programming and promotional materials.

In 1922, a license was issued for a new AM broadcasting station, operating on a wavelength of 360 meters (833 kHz). This station was randomly assigned the call letters WBAO, which came from a sequential roster of available call signs. It maintained a limited schedule of broadcasts. On May 25, 1928, the Federal Radio Commission (FRC) issued General Order 32, which notified 164 stations, including WBAO, that "From an examination of your application for future license it does not find that public interest, convenience, or necessity would be served by granting it." On September 1, 1928, the FRC listed "Stations WJBL and WBAO" as one of the "consolidations which have been approved by the commission, or imposed on the stations by the commission". WBAO was formally deleted on October 1, 1928, and it was announced that programs previously broadcast by that station would now be heard over WJBL.

== Athletics ==
Since their first year of athletics in the 1903–04 academic year and prior to joining the NCAA Division III and the CCIW in the 1946–47 season, Millikin primarily competed as an Independent of the National Association of Intercollegiate Athletics (NAIA). Millikin University teams have since participated in the National Collegiate Athletic Association's Division III. The Big Blue are a member of the College Conference of Illinois and Wisconsin (CCIW). Men's sports include baseball, basketball, cross country, football, golf, wrestling, soccer, swimming and diving, tennis, track and field, and volleyball; while women's sports include basketball, cross country, golf, soccer, softball, triathlon, swimming & diving, tennis, track & field and volleyball.

== Notable alumni ==
=== Actors and musicians ===
- Jodi Benson – Actress and singer
- Sierra Boggess – Actress and singer
- Joel Kim Booster – Actor
- Hedy Burress – Actress
- Annamary Dickey – Actress and singer
- Katelyn Epperly – Singer
- Tad Hilgenbrink – Actor
- Michael Maize – Actor
- Jen Tullock – Actress
- Annie Wersching – Actress
- Matthew West – Musician
- Monica Witni – Composer

=== Artists ===
- Herbert D. Ryman – Disney artist, imagineer, and chief designer of the Cinderella Castle

=== Athletes and coaches ===
- George Corbett – professional football player
- Sid Gepford – professional football player
- Lori Kerans – college basketball coach
- Fred T. Long – professional football player and college football coach
- Harry Long – college football coach
- Chuck Martin – college football coach
- Danny Moeller – professional baseball player
- Jeff Monken – college football coach
- Marcia Morey – Olympic swimmer
- George Musso – professional football player
- Jeff Query – professional football player
- Mike Rowland – professional baseball player
- Don Shroyer – college football coach
- Virgil Wagner – professional football player
- Art Wilson – professional baseball player

=== Authors and media figures ===
- Alice Ambrose (1906–2001) – philosopher, logician, and author
- Gigi Goode – American drag queen and runner-up on RuPaul's Drag Race (season 12)
- Aura Mayari – Filipino-American drag queen known for competing on RuPaul's Drag Race (season 15) and RuPaul's Drag Race All Stars (season 11)
- Florence Page Jaques (1890–1972) – author
- Lucille Ryman Carroll – Hollywood talent executive during early 20th century

=== Business figures ===
- Douglas R. Oberhelman – Former chairman and chief executive officer of Caterpillar Inc.
- A.E. Staley (Hon.) - founder and chairman of A.E. Staley Manufacturing Company

=== Higher education leaders ===
- Trevor Bates - president of Wilmington College
- James L. Fisher - president of Towson University and the Council for Advancement and Support of Education

=== Public service ===
- Jeff Armbruster - Ohio State Senator for District 13 from 1999 to 2006
- Scott R. Britton - Member of the Cook County Board of Commissioners
- Rodney L. Davis – United States Congressman (R-Illinois).
- Thomas W. Ewing – United States Congressman (R-Illinois)
- Melvin R. Laird, Sr. – Wisconsin State Senator and clergyman
- Robert Madigan - Illinois State Senator and brother of Congressman and Cabinet Secretary Edward Madigan
- James Benton Parsons – United States federal judge; in 1961 he was the first African American to serve as a US Federal District Judge, appointed to the Northern District of Illinois, in Chicago, IL
- Elbert S. Smith - Illinois State Senator, Illinois Auditor of Public Accounts, vice-president of the 6th Illinois Constitutional Convention
- Kevin Vann - Roman Catholic Bishop of Diocese of Orange, and former Bishop of Fort Worth, Texas
- Thomas D. Westfall – former mayor of El Paso, Texas
- Rickey Williams Jr. – first African-American mayor of Danville, Illinois

== See also ==
- National Bird-Feeding Society#Bird seed preferences (NBFS)
- Richland Community College
