= A. E. Staley =

American starch and sweetener manufacturer

- Industry: Process manufacturing Food processing
- Founded: 1906 (incorporated as A. E. Staley Manufacturing Company)
- Headquarters: Decatur, Illinois, United States
- Products: Starches; Sweeteners

The A. E. Staley Manufacturing Company was an American food products manufacturing company. It was purchased by Tate & Lyle in 1988, and in 2022 was incorporated into their newly formed Primient subsidiary, of which KPS Capital Partners holds a controlling interest.

== History ==
Augustus Eugene "Gene" Staley (25 February 1867 – 26 December 1940) founded a business of repacking and selling cornstarch under his own Cream brand in Baltimore in 1898. On 6 November 1906, he incorporated the business as A. E. Staley Manufacturing Company (A. E. Staley) in order to start his own production of food starch. In 1909, Gene Staley purchased an inoperative cornstarch plant in Decatur, Illinois. He paid $45,000 and spent three years rebuilding and upgrading the plant with capital that he had raised from stockholders. The factory began processing on March 12, 1912.

A. E. Staley became one of the largest processors of corn in the United States, second only to Archer Daniels Midland (ADM), also based in Decatur, Illinois. It also processed soybeans under a partnership agreement with ADM at its Decatur, Illinois, plant. ADM, through a subsidiary, owned 7.4% of A. E. Staley and often assisted A. E. Staley in filling corn syrup orders for CPC International when the company was in short supply of product. Both companies also had joint ventures producing corn sweeteners in Central America.

A. E. Staley also produced many famous food and household brands, including Cream Corn Starch, Staley Pancake and Waffle Syrup, Sta-Puf fabric softener, Sta-Flo liquid starch and Sno Bol toilet bowl cleaner. The food and household brands were subsequently sold to Purex Industries, Inc. in 1981. Presently [when?], only Cream Corn Starch (Conagra Brands), Sta-Flo liquid starch (Henkel) and Sno Bol toilet bowl cleaner (Armaly Brands) continue to exist.

In 1985, A. E. Staley purchased CFS Continental, a wholesale grocery company, for $360 million. A. E. Staley stated a need to diversify away from bulk food processing. After the acquisition, A. E. Staley changed its name to Staley Continental, Inc. (until 1993).

In 1988, British company Tate & Lyle acquired 90% of A. E. Staley for $1.42 billion. Prior to the purchase, Tate & Lyle announced that it planned to sell CFS Continental to SYSCO, another wholesale grocer, for $700 million to help fund the acquisition. In 2000, Tate & Lyle acquired the remaining 10% of the company.

== 1993 labor lockout controversy ==
On Sunday, June 27, 1993, A. E. Staley officials decided to lock out A. E. Staley employees who were members of the Allied Industrial Workers of America Union. The lockout incident was the result of nearly a decade of labor disputes between management and Staley's unionized workers. The decline in pay and wages began in 1985 when A. E. Staley merged with Continental Foods, forming Staley Continental. During the next three years, the union was forced to make concessions as management was concerned about the plant remaining viable. Base pay was frozen at $10.80 per hour and workers complained of long overtime hours and declining safety conditions. After London based Tate & Lyle purchased A. E. Staley in 1988, conditions got worse for the factory workers. In 1989, contract negotiations began for a new three-year contract. While the bargaining committee was hoping to end the salary freeze and improving safety standards, the company was ushering in new practices, such as rotating shifts and deskilling of jobs as well as elimination of many safety procedures.

In 1991, the company hired a new labor relations director who was known for promoting union busting practices. Workers with years and decades of experience at the plant were fired and new supervisors forced workers to ignore OSHA regulations. A new attendance policy was also instituted and workers were shocked to find out that anyone with over seven absences per year would be fired and the number of allowed absences would decrease every year. A few months later, company management announced a new set of offences that were grounds for immediate termination. This list included "smoking outside of designated areas; loafing; dishonesty; sleeping on duty; insubordination; refusal to work overtime as directed; unauthorized possession of a camera; and use of abusive or threatening language." This was a gross violation of the union contract, which states that employers cannot fire employees without having the "just cause" to do so. Due to this new regulation, more workers were fired during the next year than had been fired in the previous twenty years combined.

Considering the climate, it was no surprise that continued contract negotiations were unsuccessful. Under the guidance of Jerry Tucker, the union began to organize an in-plant "work to rule" campaign, where workers pressure management to reach a fair campaign by altering their behavior on the job, as opposed to going on strike. At A. E. Staley, this meant that the workers collectively decided to do only what they were told to do by their supervisor without their past knowledge and experiences. They performed only their outlined job duties and nothing extra. The goal of the work to rule campaign was to show management that the factory could not be run without the knowledge and skills of the workers. In many ways, A. E. Staley was the perfect environment for this type of labor tactic, as most unionized workers had acquired skills over the years that boosted overall production and quality of the product. Management and new supervisors simply did not have this knowledge and skills to effectively instruct workers. This was evidenced in the fact that over the next 11 months during which the work to rule campaign occurred, production fell drastically. A company spokesperson estimated that production had fallen by 32%, but union estimates were upwards of 50%.

The New York Times reported that the decision resulting in the lockout of A. E. Staley union employees were due to Staley officials claiming that workers had been sabotaging plant operations for the weeks prior to the lockout. Representatives from the Allied Industrial Workers of America, claimed that there were no reports of any employees being reprimanded for sabotage, going back nine months since the lockout.

The lockout resulted in a two and half-year labor movement that ended in 1996. During that period, union workers fought to win back a fair contract, which eliminated mandatory 12-hour shifts and mandatory overtime, and address safety concerns. The lockout turned into a national labor movement when union workers from two other Decatur-based companies, Caterpillar Inc. and Firestone Tire and Rubber Company, walked out on contract disputes in August 1994 and joined lockout workers from A. E. Staley in protests, picketing and public demonstrations.

== Chicago Bears football team ==
"Without Gene Staley, there never would have been the Chicago Bears.
The Staley company was indirectly and partially responsible for the founding of the National Football League."

— George Halas,

In 1917, A. E. Staley's Fellowship Club formed a baseball team managed by future Baseball Hall of Famer Joe McGinnity. Gene Staley was a big sports fan, believing it helped build character and instill a sense of competition in his employees. Two years later, the Fellowship Club created a football counterpart. The players on both teams worked as semi-professionals in his factory. The football team, nicknamed the Decatur Staleys and headed by a coach named Brennan, competed on the independent circuit in 1919; after losing its first game, the team won six in a row to go 6–1.

In March 1920, George Halas, a minor league baseball and college football player, was invited by A. E. Staley superintendent George Chamberlain to head the football team. Halas agreed on the conditions that he may sign and invite his former teammates to play and work for the company, which Chamberlain accepted. "I was elated", Halas wrote in his autobiography. "I saw the offer as an exciting opportunity but did not suspect the tremendous future Mr. Staley was opening for me." Halas played for both the football and baseball teams in addition to working as a scale clerk. In the summer, he assisted in forming the American Professional Football Association (APFA), which eventually became the National Football League. The Staleys went 10–1–2 in the 1920 season and lost out to the Akron Pros for the championship. Although much of the team's home games were played at Staley Field, the team struggled financially due to the stadium holding only 1,500 fans and not producing enough money from ticket sales. The situation was exacerbated by company employees receiving 50 percent discounts on their tickets. Halas elected to move a game against the Chicago Cardinals to Cubs Park in Chicago to alleviate monetary stress. Nevertheless, A. E. Staley's funding continued to drain, and the company ended the 1920 season having lost $14,406.36. In compensation, Gene Staley ordered the team to pay back the 2.5 hours of work that had been used to practice.

The Staley starchworks, as shown in a 1921 company ad.

Halas became A. E. Staley's athletic director in March 1921. When the depression of 1920–21 hit, Gene Staley convinced Halas to move the team to Chicago for the 1921 APFA season, and gave him $5,000 to fund the team and promote the company in exchange for keeping the name Staleys. Now known as the Chicago Staleys, the team won the championship with a 9–1–1 record.

During the 1922 league meeting, debate flared over the Staleys' ownership status. Halas and partner Dutch Sternaman ran the team, but agent Bill Harley also sought to do the same. When the APFA contacted Staley, he responded that the move to Chicago also included Halas inheriting full ownership of the team. In an 8–2 vote, league owners decided in favor of Halas/Sternaman. Halas later renamed the team to the Chicago Bears. Although he no longer owned the team, Staley regularly attended Bears games and nicknamed them the "Transplants".

In October 1956, to celebrate A. E. Staley's 50-year anniversary, Halas organized a "Staley Day" for the Bears–Baltimore Colts game at Wrigley Field. The Bears reserved 1,000 seats for company employees and allowed only them to purchase game tickets from September 3–10, while Wabash Railroad designated a special train from Dearborn Station to the stadium. Halas invited surviving Staley teammates to the game and an evening dinner, while Staley's son A. E. Staley Jr. and Decatur mayor Clarence A. Sablotny also attended the game. The Bears won 58–27, the most points scored by the Bears since 1940.

Staley serves as the namesake of the Bears' mascot Staley Da Bear.

== Lake Decatur ==
In 1922, Gene Staley proposed a project to the city of Decatur that would create Lake Decatur, which is Illinois’ largest artificial body of water, being 2800 acres and having a 30-mile shoreline. Staley needed the lake to supply 19 million gallons of water a day. Staley threatened to close his plant and move it to Peoria, Illinois if the Decatur City Council refused to allow the construction of the artificial lake. The City Council allowed the company to go forward with the project, and construction began in 1922.
