= List of NFL players (R) =

This is a list of players who have appeared in at least one regular season or postseason game in the National Football League (NFL), American Football League (AFL), or All-America Football Conference (AAFC) and have a last name that starts with "R". This list is accurate through the end of the 2025 NFL season.

== Ra ==
- Marc Raab
- Bob Raba
- Casey Rabach
- Warren Rabb
- Mike Rabold
- Buster Raborn
- Chilo Rachal
- Latario Rachal
- Frank Racis
- Neil Rackers
- David Rackley
- Derek Rackley
- Will Rackley
- George Radachowsky
- John Rade
- Keith Radecic
- Scott Radecic
- Bill Rademacher
- Jason Rader
- Kevin Rader
- Bruce Radford
- Ken Radick
- Wayne Radloff
- Alex Rado
- George Rado
- George Radosevich
- Bill Radovich
- Dillon Radunz
- Vic Radzievitch
- Mike Rae
- Norbert Raemer
- Bill Raffel
- Ian Rafferty
- Tom Rafferty
- Vince Rafferty
- Billy Rafter
- Trey Ragas
- Phil Ragazzo
- Reggie Ragland
- Floyd Raglin
- Frank Ragnow
- Dave Ragone
- George Ragsdale
- Vincent Ragunas
- Pat Ragusa
- Steve Raible
- Jim Raiff
- Bernhard Raimann
- Dave Raimey
- Ben Raimondi
- Wali Rainer
- Mike Raines
- Bobby Rainey
- Chris Rainey
- Dan Rains
- Dominic Raiola
- Donovan Raiola
- B. J. Raji
- Peter Rajkovich
- Ennis Rakestraw
- Larry Rakestraw
- Gregg Rakoczy
- Dan Ralph
- Nick Ralston
- Bacarri Rambo
- Ken-Yon Rambo
- Ryan Ramczyk
- Jim Ramey
- Jose Ramirez
- Manuel Ramirez
- Tony Ramirez
- Joe Ramona
- Andre Ramsey
- Buster Ramsey
- Chuck Ramsey
- Derrick Ramsey
- Frank Ramsey
- Greg Ramsey
- Jalen Ramsey
- Knox Ramsey
- LaJuan Ramsey
- Nate Ramsey
- Patrick Ramsey
- Randy Ramsey
- Ray Ramsey
- Red Ramsey
- Steve Ramsey
- Tom Ramsey
- Eason Ramson
- Curtis Randall
- Damarious Randall
- Dennis Randall
- Greg Randall
- Kheeston Randall
- Marcus Randall
- Tom Randall
- Proc Randels
- Ervin Randle
- John Randle
- Joseph Randle
- Rueben Randle
- Sonny Randle
- Tate Randle
- Antwaan Randle El
- Al Randolph
- Clare Randolph
- Harry Randolph
- Terry Randolph
- Thomas Randolph
- Louis Rankin
- Martinas Rankin
- Walt Rankin
- Sheldon Rankins
- Derrick Ransom
- Lathan Ransom
- Keith Ranspot
- John Rapacz
- Bob Rapp
- Herb Rapp
- Manny Rapp
- Taylor Rapp
- Walter Rasby
- Am Rascher
- Lou Rash
- Ahmad Rashad
- Sha'reff Rashad
- Hamilcar Rashed Jr.
- Kenyon Rasheed
- Saleem Rasheed
- Leo Raskowski
- Rocky Rasley
- Kemp Rasmussen
- Randy Rasmussen (born 1945)
- Randy Rasmussen (born 1960)
- Wayne Rasmussen
- Nick Rassas
- Ed Rate
- Roy Ratekin
- Bo Rather
- Tom Rathman
- Joe Ratica
- Brian Ratigan
- Ray Ratkowski
- Tate Ratledge
- Damion Ratley
- Don Ratliff
- Jay Ratliff
- Keiwan Ratliff
- Tim Rattay
- Fred Ratterman
- George Ratterman
- Spencer Rattler
- Ryan Rau
- Dick Rauch
- John Rauch
- C.J. Ravenell
- Bob Ravensberg
- Eric Ravotti
- Bob Rawlings
- Thomas Rawls
- Baby Ray
- Darrol Ray
- David Ray
- Eddie Ray
- John Ray
- LaBryan Ray
- Marcus Ray
- Ricky Ray
- Shane Ray
- Terry Ray
- Wyatt Ray
- Thomas Rayam
- Israel Raybon
- Sam Rayburn
- Van Rayburn
- Jimmy Raye II
- Jimmy Raye III
- Caesar Rayford
- Fred Rayhle
- Andrew Raym
- Cory Raymer
- Corey Raymond
- Kalif Raymond
- Mistral Raymond
- Dave Rayner
- Rick Razzano

== Rea–Reh ==
- Kevin Reach
- Jack Read
- D. J. Reader
- Jamie Reader
- Russ Reader
- Ike Readon
- Frank Reagan
- Ed Reagen
- Jalen Reagor
- Montae Reagor
- Charles Ream
- Tommy Reamon
- Kerry Reardon
- Keith Reaser
- Gary Reasons
- Darrin Reaves
- Jeremy Reaves
- John Reaves
- Ken Reaves
- Willard Reaves
- C.J. Reavis
- Dave Reavis
- Rusty Rebowe
- Paul Rebsamen
- Dave Recher
- Bert Rechichar
- Ray Reckmack
- Jamaica Rector
- Ron Rector
- Glen Redd
- Silas Redd
- Vince Redd
- Barry Redden
- Haason Reddick
- Kevin Reddick
- Cory Redding
- Reggie Redding
- Sheepy Redeen
- Kasey Redfern
- Corn Redick
- Ruel Redinger
- Chris Redman
- Gus Redman
- Isaac Redman
- Rick Redman
- Anthony Redmon
- Adam Redmond
- Alex Redmond
- Jalen Redmond
- Jimmy Redmond
- J.R. Redmond
- Rudy Redmond
- Tom Redmond
- Will Redmond
- Jarvis Redwine
- Sheldrick Redwine
- Lucien Reeberg
- Beasley Reece
- Danny Reece
- Don Reece
- Geoff Reece
- John Reece
- Marcel Reece
- Travis Reece
- Alvin Reed
- Andre Reed
- Ben Reed
- Bobby Reed
- Brooks Reed
- Chris Reed
- D'Aundre Reed
- David Reed
- D. J. Reed
- Doug Reed
- Ed Reed
- Frank Reed
- Henry Reed
- Jake Reed
- James Reed (born 1955)
- James Reed (born 1977)
- Jarran Reed
- Jayden Reed
- Jaylen Reed
- Jeff Reed
- Jerrick Reed
- Joe Reed (born 1948)
- Joe Reed (born 1998)
- Jordan Reed
- Josh Reed
- J. R. Reed (born 1982)
- J. R. Reed (born 1996)
- Kalan Reed
- Kerry Reed
- Leo Reed
- Malik Reed
- Mark Reed
- Max Reed
- Michael Reed
- Mike Reed
- Nick Reed
- Nikko Reed
- Oscar Reed
- Rayshun Reed
- Robert Reed (born 1943)
- Robert Reed (born 1975)
- Rock Reed
- Smith Reed
- Taft Reed
- Tony Reed
- Trovon Reed
- Dan Reeder
- Troy Reeder
- Bernard Reedy
- Albert Reese
- Allen Reese
- Archie Reese
- Booker Reese
- Dave Reese
- Don Reese
- Guy Reese
- Hank Reese
- Ike Reese
- Izell Reese
- Jerry Reese (born 1955)
- Jerry Reese (born 1964)
- Jerry Reese (born 1973)
- Ken Reese
- Lloyd Reese
- Marcus Reese
- Otis Reese
- Steve Reese
- Lew Reeve
- Bryan Reeves
- Carl Reeves
- Dan Reeves
- Jacques Reeves
- John Reeves
- Ken Reeves
- Marion Reeves
- Roy Reeves
- Walter Reeves
- Jalen Reeves-Maybin
- Jim Regan
- Shawn Regent
- John Reger
- Tom Regner
- Pete Regnier
- Moses Regular
- Steve Rehage
- Scott Rehberg
- Tom Rehder
- Ryan Rehkow
- Milt Rehnquist

== Rei–Rh ==
- Frank Reich
- Will Reichard
- Bill Reichardt
- Lou Reichel
- Mike Reichenbach
- Dick Reichle
- Chuck Reichow
- Jerry Reichow
- Alan Reid
- Andy Reid
- Bill Reid
- Breezy Reid
- Caraun Reid
- Darrell Reid
- Dexter Reid
- Eric Reid
- Gabe Reid
- Jah Reid
- Jim Reid
- Joe Reid
- John Reid
- Justin Reid
- Lamont Reid
- Karene Reid
- Michael Reid
- Mike Reid (born 1947)
- Mike Reid (born 1970)
- Spencer Reid
- Willie Reid
- Winston Reid
- Riley Reiff
- Bob Reifsnyder
- George Reihner
- Dameon Reilly
- Jim Reilly
- Kevin Reilly
- Mike Reilly (born 1942)
- Mike Reilly (born 1959)
- Trevor Reilly
- Tip Reiman
- Bruce Reimers
- Mike Reinfeldt
- Bill Reinhard
- Bob Reinhard
- Jeff Reinke
- Chris Reis
- Earl Reiser
- Allen Reisner
- Bill Reissig
- Albie Reisz
- Austin Reiter
- Peck Reiter
- Joe Reitz
- Johnny Rembert
- Reggie Rembert
- Nikko Remigio
- Bill Remington
- Mike Remmers
- Dennis Remmert
- Roger Remo
- Dan Remsberg
- Tyshun Render
- Sean Renfree
- Dean Renfro
- Dick Renfro
- Leonard Renfro
- Mel Renfro
- Mike Renfro
- Ray Renfro
- Will Renfro
- Hunter Renfrow
- Mike Rengel
- Neil Rengel
- Bob Renn
- Terry Rennaker
- Bill Renner
- Jess Reno
- Caesar Rentie
- Pug Rentner
- Larry Rentz
- Lance Rentzel
- Jay Repko
- Joe Repko
- Mike Reppond
- Glenn Ressler
- Joe Restic
- Xavier Restrepo
- Jared Retkofsky
- Pete Retzlaff
- Alan Reuber
- Konrad Reuland
- Vic Reuter
- Randy Reutershan
- Ray Reutt
- Fuad Reveiz
- Shavon Revel
- Darrelle Revis
- Freeman Rexer
- Vincent Rey
- Kendall Reyes
- Sammis Reyes
- Tutan Reyes
- Darius Reynaud
- Al Reynolds
- Bill Reynolds
- Billy Reynolds
- Bob Reynolds (born 1914)
- Bob Reynolds (born 1939)
- Chase Reynolds
- Chuck Reynolds
- Craig Reynolds
- Dallas Reynolds
- Ed Reynolds (born 1961)
- Ed Reynolds (born 1991)
- Garrett Reynolds
- Homer Reynolds
- Jack Reynolds
- Jamal Reynolds
- Jerry Reynolds
- Jim Reynolds (born 1920)
- Jim Reynolds (born 1921)
- Joffrey Reynolds
- John Reynolds
- Josh Reynolds
- Keenan Reynolds
- LaRoy Reynolds
- M.C. Reynolds
- Owen Reynolds
- Quentin Reynolds
- Ricky Reynolds
- Robert Reynolds
- Tom Reynolds
- Demetrius Rhaney
- Jon Rhattigan
- Floyd Rhea
- Hugh Rhea
- Leonta Rheams
- Steve Rhem
- Elmer Rhenstrom
- Errict Rhett
- Coby Rhinehart
- Jay Rhodemyre
- Bruce Rhodes
- Danny Rhodes
- Dominic Rhodes
- Don Rhodes
- Kerry Rhodes
- Luke Rhodes
- Ray Rhodes
- Xavier Rhodes
- Jerry Rhome
- Earnest Rhone
- Sean Rhyan
- Buster Rhymes
- Forrest Rhyne

== Ri ==
- Frank Ribar
- Dave Ribble
- Paul Riblett
- Alan Ricard
- Patrick Ricard
- Benny Ricardo
- Jim Ricca
- Giovanni Ricci
- Rice
- Allen Rice
- Andy Rice
- Bill Rice
- Brenden Rice
- Dan Rice
- Denzel Rice
- Floyd Rice
- George Rice
- Harold Rice
- Jerry Rice
- Ken Rice
- Monty Rice
- Rashee Rice
- Ray Rice
- Rodney Rice
- Ron Rice
- Sidney Rice
- Simeon Rice
- Herb Rich
- Randy Rich
- Gary Richard
- Jalen Richard
- Jamey Richard
- Kris Richard
- Stanley Richard
- Asim Richards
- Bobby Richards
- Curvin Richards
- David Richards
- Dick Richards
- Golden Richards
- Howard Richards
- Jeff Richards
- Jim Richards
- Jordan Richards
- Kink Richards
- Perry Richards
- Pete Richards
- Ray Richards
- Ted Richards
- Al Richardson (born 1935)
- Al Richardson (born 1957)
- Anthony Richardson
- Barry Richardson
- Bob Richardson
- Bobby Richardson
- Bucky Richardson
- C.J. Richardson
- Charlie Richardson
- Cyril Richardson
- Damien Richardson
- Daryl Richardson
- David Richardson
- Decamerion Richardson
- Demani Richardson
- Eric Richardson
- Ernie Richardson
- Gloster Richardson
- Grady Richardson
- Greg Richardson
- Huey Richardson
- Jay Richardson
- Jeff Richardson
- Jerry Richardson (born 1936)
- Jerry Richardson (born 1941)
- Jess Richardson
- John Richardson
- JP Richardson
- Kyle Richardson
- Mike Richardson (born 1946)
- Mike Richardson (born 1961)
- Mike Richardson (born 1984)
- Paul Richardson (born 1969)
- Paul Richardson (born 1992)
- Pete Richardson
- Reggie Richardson
- Rico Richardson
- Sean Richardson
- Sheldon Richardson
- Terry Richardson
- Tom Richardson
- Tony Richardson
- Trent Richardson
- Wally Richardson
- Will Richardson
- Willie Richardson
- Weston Richburg
- Ray Richeson
- Mike Richey
- Tom Richey
- Wade Richey
- David Richie
- Aldo Richins
- Harry Richman
- Mason Richman
- Rock Richmond
- Bo Richter
- Frank Richter
- Les Richter
- Pat Richter
- Paul Rickards
- Tom Ricketts
- Eli Ricks
- Harold Ricks
- Lawrence Ricks
- Mikhael Ricks
- Speed Riddell
- Desmond Ridder
- Louis Riddick
- Ray Riddick
- Robb Riddick
- Theo Riddick
- Ryan Riddle
- Brandon Rideau
- Houston Ridge
- Dante Ridgeway
- Hassan Ridgeway
- John Ridgeway III
- Elston Ridgle
- Colin Ridgway
- Preston Ridlehuber
- Don Ridler
- Calvin Ridley
- Riley Ridley
- Stevan Ridley
- Jim Ridlon
- Chris Riehm
- Jay Riemersma
- John Rienstra
- Doug Riesenberg
- Bill Rieth
- Charlie Rieves
- Dick Rifenburg
- Charley Riffle
- Dick Riffle
- Charles Riggins
- John Riggins
- Bob Riggle
- Cody Riggs
- Gerald Riggs
- Jim Riggs
- Thron Riggs
- Joe Righetti
- Riley
- Avon Riley
- Bob Riley
- Bobby Riley
- Butch Riley
- Cameron Riley
- Curtis Riley
- Duke Riley
- Elijah Riley
- Eric Riley
- Eron Riley
- Eugene Riley
- Jack Riley
- Jim Riley
- Jordon Riley
- Karon Riley
- Ken Riley
- Larry Riley
- Lee Riley
- Pat Riley
- Perry Riley
- Phillip Riley
- Preston Riley
- Quincy Riley
- Steve Riley
- Victor Riley
- Dave Rimington
- Brian Rimpf
- Stuart Rindy
- Chad Rinehart
- Bill Ring
- Javon Ringer
- Christian Ringo
- Jim Ringo
- Kelee Ringo
- Carroll Ringwalt
- Hop Riopel
- Mike Riordan
- Tim Riordan
- Marcus Rios
- Aaron Ripkowski
- Alan Risher
- Cody Risien
- Ed Risk
- Elliott Risley
- Dalton Risner
- Andre Rison
- Ray Rissmiller
- Ray Risvold
- Jim Ritcher
- James Ritchey
- Del Ritchhart
- Jon Ritchie
- Constantin Ritzmann
- Gabe Rivera
- Hank Rivera
- Marco Rivera
- Mike Rivera
- Mychal Rivera
- Ron Rivera
- Steve Rivera
- Chauncey Rivers
- David Rivers
- Derek Rivers
- Garland Rivers
- Gerald Rivers
- Jalen Rivers
- Jamie Rivers
- Keith Rivers
- Marcellus Rivers
- Nate Rivers
- Philip Rivers
- Reggie Rivers
- Ron Rivers
- Ronnie Rivers
- Don Rives
- Jack Rizzo
- Joe Rizzo

== Roa–Rof ==
- David Roach
- John Roach
- Malcolm Roach
- Nick Roach
- Rollin Roach
- Travis Roach
- Trevor Roach
- Carl Roaches
- Willie Roaf
- Michael Roan
- Oscar Roan
- Harry Robb
- Joe Robb
- Loyal Robb
- Stan Robb
- Austin Robbins
- Barret Robbins
- Brad Robbins
- Fred Robbins
- Jack Robbins
- Kevin Robbins
- Randy Robbins
- Tootie Robbins
- Mike Roberg
- Bo Roberson
- Chris Roberson
- Derick Roberson
- Derrick Roberson
- James Roberson
- Lake Roberson
- Marcus Roberson
- Vern Roberson
- Alfredo Roberts
- Andre Roberts
- Archie Roberts
- Bill Roberts
- C. R. Roberts
- Cliff Roberts
- Darryl Roberts
- Elandon Roberts
- Elijah Roberts
- Fred Roberts
- Gary Roberts
- Gene Roberts
- George Roberts
- Greg Roberts
- Guy Roberts (born 1900)
- Guy Roberts (born 1950)
- Hal Roberts
- Jack Roberts
- Larry Roberts
- Mace Roberts
- Michael Roberts
- Ray Roberts
- Red Roberts
- Sam Roberts
- Seth Roberts
- Terrell Roberts
- Tim Roberts
- Tom Roberts
- Walter Roberts
- Wes Roberts
- William Roberts
- Willie Roberts
- Wooky Roberts
- Amik Robertson
- Bernard Robertson
- Bob Robertson
- Bobby Robertson
- Craig Robertson
- Dewayne Robertson
- Harry Robertson
- Isiah Robertson
- Jamal Robertson
- James Robertson
- Marcus Robertson
- Pete Robertson
- Tom Robertson
- Tracy Robertson
- Travian Robertson
- Tyrone Robertson
- Roy Robertson-Harris
- Paul Robeson
- Que Robinson
- Nickell Robey
- Aaron Robinson
- Adrian Robinson
- Adrien Robinson
- Aldrick Robinson
- Allen Robinson
- Alton Robinson
- A'Shawn Robinson
- Bijan Robinson
- Bill Robinson
- Billy Robinson
- Bo Robinson
- Brian Robinson Jr.
- Bryan Robinson
- Cam Robinson
- Charley Robinson
- Chop Robinson
- Corey Robinson
- Craig Robinson
- Curtis Robinson
- Damien Robinson
- Darius Robinson
- Dave Robinson
- DeJuan Robinson
- DelJuan Robinson
- Demarcus Robinson
- Denard Robinson
- Derreck Robinson
- Dominique Robinson
- Don Robinson
- Dunta Robinson
- Ed Robinson (born 1896)
- Ed Robinson (born 1970)
- Eddie Robinson
- Edmond Robinson
- Ethan Robinson
- Eugene Robinson
- Frank Robinson
- Fred Robinson (born 1930)
- Fred Robinson (born 1961)
- Freddie Robinson
- Gerald Robinson
- Gerell Robinson
- Gijon Robinson
- Gil Robinson
- Glenn Robinson
- Greg Robinson (born 1962)
- Greg Robinson (born 1969)
- Greg Robinson (born 1992)
- Gregg Robinson
- Jack Robinson
- Jacque Robinson
- James Robinson
- Jammie Robinson
- Janarius Robinson
- Jeff Robinson
- Jeroy Robinson
- Jerry Robinson (born 1939)
- Jerry Robinson (born 1956)
- Jimmy Robinson
- Johnnie Robinson
- Johnny Robinson (born 1938)
- Johnny Robinson (born 1959)
- Josh Robinson (born 1991)
- Josh Robinson (born 1992)
- Junior Robinson
- Keenan Robinson
- Keilan Robinson
- Kenny Robinson Jr.
- Kevin Robinson
- Khiry Robinson
- Koren Robinson
- Larry Robinson (born 1951)
- Larry Robinson (born 1962)
- Laurent Robinson
- Lee Robinson
- Layden Robinson
- Luther Robinson
- Lybrant Robinson
- Marcus Robinson
- Mark Robinson (born 1962)
- Mark Robinson (born 1999)
- Matt Robinson
- Micah Robinson
- Michael Robinson (born 1973)
- Michael Robinson (born 1983)
- Mike Robinson
- Patrick Robinson (born 1969)
- Patrick Robinson (born 1987)
- Paul Robinson
- Rafael Robinson
- Ramzee Robinson
- Rashard Robinson
- Reggie Robinson II
- Rex Robinson
- Ryan Robinson
- Ryne Robinson
- Shelton Robinson
- Stacy Robinson
- Tavius Robinson
- Terrence Robinson
- Tony Robinson
- Travaris Robinson
- Trenton Robinson
- Trevor Robinson
- Ty Robinson
- Tyrese Robinson
- Virgil Robinson
- Wan'Dale Robinson
- Wayne Robinson
- William Robinson
- Brian Robiskie
- Terry Robiskie
- Brian Robison
- Burle Robison
- George Robison
- Tommy Robison
- Hal Robl
- Ed Robnett
- Marshall Robnett
- Frank Robotti
- Andy Robustelli
- Bradley Roby
- Courtney Roby
- Doug Roby
- Reggie Roby
- Sav Rocca
- Alden Roche
- Brian Roche
- Quincy Roche
- Isaac Rochell
- Robert Rochell
- Paul Rochester
- Walt Rock
- Lyle Rockenbach
- David Rocker
- Tracy Rocker
- Jim Rockford
- Chris Rockins
- Hank Rockwell
- Mike Rodak
- Jeff Rodenberger
- Mark Rodenhauser
- Mirro Roder
- Ben Roderick
- John Roderick
- Aaron Rodgers
- Amari Rodgers
- Del Rodgers
- Derrick Rodgers
- Hosea Rodgers
- Isaiah Rodgers
- Jacquizz Rodgers
- Jake Rodgers
- John Rodgers
- Johnny Rodgers
- Richard Rodgers
- Tom Rodgers
- Tyrone Rodgers
- Willie Rodgers
- Dominique Rodgers-Cromartie
- Chris Rodriguez
- Evan Rodriguez
- Jess Rodriguez
- Kelly Rodriguez
- Levi Drake Rodriguez
- Malcolm Rodriguez
- Mike Rodriguez
- Ruben Rodriguez
- Bill Roe
- James Roe
- Herb Roedel
- Jeff Roehl
- Jon Roehlk
- Bill Roehnelt
- Johnny Roepke
- Fritz Roeseler
- Ben Roethlisberger
- Bill Roffler

== Rog–Roz ==
- John Rogalla
- Dan Rogas
- Fran Rogel
- Armani Rogers
- Bill Rogers
- Caleb Rogers
- Carlos Rogers
- Casey Rogers
- Charles Rogers
- Charley Rogers
- Charlie Rogers
- Chester Rogers
- Chris Rogers
- Cullen Rogers
- Da'Rick Rogers
- Don Rogers (born 1936)
- Don Rogers (born 1962)
- Doug Rogers
- Eli Rogers
- George Rogers
- Glenn Rogers
- Glynn Rogers
- Jacob Rogers
- Jimmy Rogers
- John Rogers
- Justin Rogers (linebacker) (born 1983)
- Justin Rogers (cornerback) (born 1988)
- Lamar Rogers
- Mel Rogers
- Nick Rogers
- Reggie Rogers
- Roderick Rogers
- Sam Rogers
- Shaun Rogers
- Stan Rogers
- Steve Rogers (born 1953)
- Steve Rogers (born 1959)
- Tracy Rogers
- Tyrone Rogers
- Victor Rogers
- Walt Rogers
- George Rogge
- Tom Roggeman
- Len Rohde
- George Rohleder
- Jeff Rohrer
- Herm Rohrig
- Tubby Rohsenberger
- John Rokisky
- Benji Roland
- Dennis Roland
- Johnny Roland
- Christian Roland-Wallace
- Antrel Rolle
- Brian Rolle
- Butch Rolle
- Dave Rolle
- Jumal Rolle
- Samari Rolle
- Dave Roller
- Henry Rolling
- Quinten Rollins
- George Roman
- John Roman
- Mark Roman
- Nick Roman
- Steve Romanik
- Jim Romaniszyn
- Jim Romano
- Bill Romanowski
- Dave Romasko
- Brett Romberg
- Rudy Romboli
- Stan Rome
- Tag Rome
- Tony Romeo
- Rich Romer
- Dario Romero
- Ray Romero
- Charles Romes
- Al Romine
- Milt Romney
- John Parker Romo
- Tony Romo
- Gene Ronzani
- Bill Rooney
- Cobb Rooney
- Joe Rooney
- Mark Roopenian
- Jordan Roos
- Michael Roos
- Naaman Roosevelt
- Jim Root
- Dedrick Roper
- John Roper
- Juan Roque
- Durwood Roquemore
- Jim Rorison
- Spencer Rork
- Dan Rosado
- Dante Rosario
- Aldrick Rosas
- Sal Rosato
- Rudy Rosatti
- Hatch Rosdahl
- Al Rose
- Barry Rose
- Carlton Rose
- Donovan Rose
- Gene Rose (born 1904))
- Gene Rose (born 1913)
- George Rose
- Joe Rose
- Ken Rose
- Lowell Rose
- Nick Rose
- Tam Rose
- Jim Rosecrans
- Rocky Rosema
- Josh Rosen
- Stan Rosen
- Timm Rosenbach
- Sage Rosenfels
- Roger Rosengarten
- Erik Rosenmeier
- Bob Rosenstiel
- Mike Rosenthal
- Ted Rosequist
- Ken Roskie
- Ted Rosnagle
- Aaron Ross
- Adrian Ross
- Alvin Ross
- Brandian Ross
- Cory Ross
- D'Angelo Ross
- Dan Ross
- Daniel Ross
- Dave Ross
- Derek Ross
- Derrick Ross
- Dominique Ross
- Gerard Ross
- Jay Ross
- Jeremy Ross
- Jermaine Ross
- John Ross
- Josh Ross
- Justyn Ross
- Kevin Ross
- Louis Ross
- Micah Ross
- Oliver Ross (born 1949)
- Oliver Ross (born 1974)
- Rashad Ross
- Scott Ross
- Tim Ross
- Willie Ross
- George Rosso
- Tim Rossovich
- Allen Rossum
- Ernie Rosteck
- Pete Rostosky
- Kyle Rote
- Tobin Rote
- Matt Roth
- Pete Roth
- Tim Rother
- Cliff Rothrock
- Doug Rothschild
- Fred Rothwell
- Bunmi Rotimi
- Herb Roton
- George Roudebush
- Tom Rouen
- Chase Roullier
- Raleigh Roundtree
- Ray Roundtree
- Larry Rountree
- Jim Rourke
- Aaron Rouse
- Curtis Rouse
- James Rouse
- Stillman Rouse
- Walter Rouse
- Wardell Rouse
- Tubby Roush
- Lee Rouson
- Gregory Rousseau
- Tom Roussel
- Mike Roussos
- Stanford Routt
- John Roveto
- Tony Rovinski
- Ev Rowan
- John Rowan
- Larry Rowden
- Bob Rowe (born 1911)
- Bob Rowe (born 1945)
- Dave Rowe
- Eric Rowe
- Harmon Rowe
- Joe Rowe
- Patrick Rowe
- Ray Rowe
- Eugene Rowell (born 1958)
- Eugene Rowell (born 1968)
- Brad Rowland
- Chris Rowland
- Justin Rowland
- Bob Rowley
- John Rowser
- Bravvion Roy
- Frank Roy
- Jaquelin Roy
- Spin Roy
- Andre Royal
- Eddie Royal
- Ricky Royal
- Robert Royal
- Jalen Royals
- Mark Royals
- Orpheus Roye
- Evan Royster
- Mazio Royster
- Ed Royston
- Christian Rozeboom
- Bob Rozier
- Mike Rozier
- Dave Rozumek
- Aubrey Rozzell

== Ru–Rz ==
- Ed Rubbert
- Larry Rubens
- Rob Rubick
- Ahtyba Rubin
- Anthony Rubino
- Angel Rubio
- Karl Rubke
- T. J. Rubley
- Martin Ruby
- Hayden Rucci
- Todd Rucci
- Ed Rucinski
- Leo Rucka
- Chris Rucker
- Conrad Rucker
- Frostee Rucker
- Keith Rucker
- Martin Rucker
- Mike Rucker
- Reggie Rucker
- Jeremy Ruckert
- Dwayne Rudd
- Tim Ruddy
- Jack Rudnay
- Tim Rudnick
- Jake Rudock
- Ben Rudolph
- Coleman Rudolph
- Council Rudolph
- Jack Rudolph
- Joe Rudolph
- Kyle Rudolph
- Martin Rudolph
- Mason Rudolph
- Travis Rudolph
- Paul Rudzinski
- Grey Ruegamer
- Mike Ruether
- Ken Ruettgers
- Joe Ruetz
- Howie Ruetz
- Guy Ruff
- Orlando Ruff
- Henry Ruggs III
- Emmett Ruh
- Homer Ruh
- Chris Ruhman
- Cesar Ruiz
- Justin Rukas
- Gordon Rule
- Chris Rumph
- Mike Rumph
- Max Runager
- Porky Rundquist
- Swede Rundquist
- Gil Runkel
- J. D. Runnels
- Tommy Runnels
- Jon Runyan
- Jon Runyan Jr.
- Carter Runyon
- Andrew Rupcich
- Ernie Ruple
- John Rupp
- Nelson Rupp
- Anthony Rush
- Bob Rush
- Clive Rush
- Cooper Rush
- Darius Rush
- Jerry Rush
- Marcus Rush
- Tyrone Rush
- Marion Rushing
- T. J. Rushing
- Mike Rusinek
- Reggie Rusk
- Roy Ruskusky
- Brandon Rusnak
- Bernard Russ
- Carl Russ
- Pat Russ
- Steve Russ
- Al Russas
- Alonzo Russell
- Anderson Russell
- Andy Russell
- Benny Russell
- Bo Russell
- Booker Russell
- Brady Russell
- Brian Russell
- Chapelle Russell
- Cliff Russell
- Damien Russell
- Darrell Russell
- Darryl Russell
- Derek Russell
- Dontavius Russell
- Doug Russell
- Gary Russell
- Jack Russell
- JaMarcus Russell
- Jim Russell
- J. J. Russell
- KeiVarae Russell
- Ken Russell
- Lafayette Russell
- Leonard Russell
- Matt Russell
- Reggie Russell
- Rusty Russell
- Ryan Russell
- Twan Russell
- Wade Russell
- Taylor Russolino
- Reggie Rust
- Joe Rutgens
- Mike Ruth
- Ralph Ruthstrom
- Charlie Rutkowski
- Ed Rutkowski
- Kevin Rutland
- Craig Rutledge
- Jeff Rutledge
- Johnny Rutledge
- Rod Rutledge
- Barrett Ruud
- Tom Ruud
- Roger Ruzek
- Steve Ruzich
- Bill Ryan
- Cassy Ryan
- Clifton Ryan
- Dave Ryan
- Ed Ryan
- Frank Ryan
- Jake Ryan
- Jim Ryan
- Joe Ryan
- Jon Ryan
- Kent Ryan
- Logan Ryan
- Matt Ryan
- Pat Ryan
- Rocky Ryan
- Sean Ryan
- Sod Ryan
- Tim Ryan (born 1967)
- Tim Ryan (born 1968)
- DeMeco Ryans
- Larry Ryans
- Tom Rychlec
- Billy Ryckman
- Dan Ryczek
- Paul Ryczek
- Ron Rydalch
- Nick Ryder
- Frank Rydzewski
- Jules Rykovich
- Chad Ryland
- Lou Rymkus
- Brett Rypien
- Mark Rypien
- Ted Rzempoluch
