= Philadelphia Eagles all-time roster (Kh–Z) =

1,875 players have appeared in at least one regular season or postseason game in the National Football League (NFL) for the Philadelphia Eagles franchise since 1933. This list includes those whose last names fall between "Kh" and "Z". For the rest of the players, see Philadelphia Eagles all-time roster (A–Ke). This list is accurate through the end of the 2025 NFL season.

== Kh-Ku ==
- Ed Khayat
- Adrian Killins
- Bucko Kilroy
- Jon Kimmel
- Randy Kinder
- Don King
- Darian Kinnard
- Kelly Kirchbaum
- Levon Kirkland
- Red Kirkman
- Roy Kirksey
- Ben Kish
- Dan Klecko
- John Klingel
- Pete Kmetovic
- Jack Knapper
- Jake Knott
- Charlie Knox
- Art Koeninger
- Kevin Kolb
- Elmer Kolberg
- Bill Koman
- Mark Konecny
- Walt Kowalczyk
- Scott Kowalkowski
- Kent Kramer
- Jonathan Krause
- Rich Kraynak
- Keith Krepfle
- Joe Kresky
- Bob Krieger
- Emmett Kriel
- Bert Kuczynski
- Mike Kullman
- Irv Kupcinet
- John Kusko

== L ==
- Galen Laack
- Mike Labinjo
- Rick Lackman
- Porter Lainhart
- Sean Landeta
- Derek Landri
- Mort Landsberg
- Bob Landsee
- Izzy Lang
- Jim Lankas
- Buck Lansford
- Bill Lapham
- Bill Larson
- Al Latimer
- Cameron Latu
- Ted Laux
- Joe Lavender
- Robert Lavette
- Kent Lawrence
- Reggie Lawrence
- Trevor Laws
- Gerard Lawson
- Pete Lazetich
- Milton Leathers
- Harper LeBel
- Cre'Von LeBlanc
- Roy Lechthaler
- Toy Ledbetter
- Amp Lee
- Bernie Lee
- Byron Lee
- Scott Leggett
- Frank LeMaster
- Jim Leonard
- Shaquille Leonard
- Ron Leshinski
- Steve Levanitis
- Dorsey Levens
- Chad Lewis
- Dion Lewis
- Greg Lewis
- Joe Lewis
- Michael Lewis
- Ryan Lewis
- Tex Leyendecker
- Sammy Lilly
- Dave Lince
- Trevard Lindley
- Vic Lindskog
- Augie Lio
- John Lipski
- Pete Liske
- Greg Liter
- David Little
- Dave Lloyd
- James Lofton
- Bennie Logan
- Randy Logan
- Chris Long
- Matt Long
- Don Looney
- Ron Lou
- Tom Louderback
- Rick Lovato
- Clarence Love
- Dick Lucas
- Bill Lueck
- Don Luft
- Tom Luken
- Herb Lusk

== M ==
- Ken MacAfee
- Jay MacDowell
- Art Macioszczyk
- Red Mack
- Bill Mackrides
- Jeremy Maclin
- Jim MacMurdo
- Avonte Maddox
- Jeff Maehl
- John Magee
- Drew Mahalic
- Reno Mahe
- Jordan Mailata
- John Mallory
- Art Malone
- Cameron Malveaux
- Mike Mamula
- Mike Mandarino
- Braden Mann
- Rosie Manning
- Ray Mansfield
- Von Mansfield
- Eggs Manske
- Baptiste Manzini
- Chris Maragos
- Basilio Marchi
- Marcus Mariota
- Greg Mark
- Duke Maronic
- Curtis Marsh, Jr.
- Anthony Marshall
- Byron Marshall
- Keyonta Marshall
- Larry Marshall
- Whit Marshall
- Aaron Martin
- Cecil Martin
- Kelvin Martin
- Steve Martin
- Wayne Mass
- Bob Masters
- Walt Masters
- Ed Matesic
- Ryan Mathews
- Evan Mathis
- Ochaun Mathis
- Ollie Matson
- Casey Matthews
- Jordan Matthews
- Menil Mavraides
- Byron Maxwell
- Dean May
- Jermane Mayberry
- Jared Mayden
- Rufus Mayes
- Joe Mays
- Jerry Mazzanti
- Wes McAfee
- James McAlister
- Mat McBriar
- Mac McCain
- Darnerien McCants
- Mike McClellan
- Mike McCloskey
- Tristin McCollum
- Eric McCoo
- Josh McCown
- LeSean McCoy
- Matt McCoy
- Fred McCrary
- Bobby McCray
- Hugh McCullough
- Jim McCusker
- Flip McDonald
- Les McDonald
- Tommy McDonald
- Bob McDonough
- Dexter McDougle
- Jerome McDougle
- Paul McFadden
- T. Y. McGill
- Mike McGlynn
- Tom McHale
- Pat McHugh
- Guy McIntyre
- Tanner McKee
- Marlin McKeever
- Leodis McKelvin
- Raleigh McKenzie
- Dennis McKnight
- Rodney McLeod
- Jim McMahon
- Mike McMahon
- Erik McMillan
- Dan McMillen
- Mark McMillian
- Billy McMullen
- Dexter McNabb
- Donovan McNabb
- Tom McNeill
- Marvin McNutt
- Zech McPhearson
- Forrest McPherson
- Jerrold McRae
- Tim McTyer
- Mac McWilliams
- Ed Meadows
- Steven Means
- Ron Medved
- John Mellekas
- Guido Merkens
- John Metchie
- Fred Meyer
- John Meyers
- Rich Miano
- Ed Michaels
- Mike Michel
- John Michels
- Oren Middlebrook
- Quintin Mikell
- Nick Mike-Mayer
- Barnes Milam
- Keith Millard
- Bubba Miller
- Don Miller
- Shareef Miller
- Tom Miller
- Bert Milling
- Garrett Mills
- Jalen Mills
- Gardner Minshew
- George Mira
- Dean Miraldi
- Gene Mitcham
- Brian Mitchell
- Freddie Mitchell
- Leonard Mitchell
- Martin Mitchell
- Quinyon Mitchell
- Randall Mitchell
- Ryan Moats
- Frank Molden
- David Molk
- Smael Mondon
- Art Monk
- Henry Monroe
- Wilbert Montgomery
- Tim Mooney
- Damon Moore
- Denis Moore
- Evan Moore
- Zeke Moreno
- Sean Morey
- Dennis Morgan
- Mike Morgan
- Dwaine Morris
- Guy Morriss
- Nicholas Morrow
- Bobby Morse
- Emmett Mortell
- Mark Moseley
- Dom Moselle
- Adrian Moten
- George Mrkonic
- Joe Muha
- Horst Muhlmann
- Andrew Mukuba
- George Mulligan
- Dick Murley
- Nick Murphy
- Calvin Murray
- DeMarco Murray
- Eddie Murray
- Franny Murray
- Brad Myers
- Jack Myers

== N ==
- Andy Nacrelli
- Mike Nease
- Al Nelson
- Dennis Nelson
- Steven Nelson
- Tom Nelson
- Jim Nettles
- Charles Newton
- Haloti Ngata
- Gerald Nichols
- Parry Nickerson
- John Niland
- Maury Nipp
- John Nocera
- John Norby
- Mark Nordquist
- Jerry Norton
- Jim Norton
- Jordan Norwood
- Walt Nowak

== O ==
- Don Oakes
- Harry O'Boyle
- Davey O'Brien
- Ken O'Brien
- Henry Obst
- Derrick Oden
- Moro Ojomo
- Azeez Ojulari
- Ogbonnia Okoronkwo
- Albert Okwuegbunam
- Bill Olds
- Greg Oliver
- Hubie Oliver
- Brian O'Neal
- Sua Opeta
- Jim Opperman
- Red O'Quinn
- Bob Oristaglio
- Elliott Ormsbee
- Mike Osborn
- Richard Osborne
- Joe Ostman
- John Outlaw
- Bill Overmyer
- Don Owens
- Jeff Owens
- Terrell Owens

== P ==
- Dave Pacella
- Max Padlow
- Jarrad Page
- Joe Pagliei
- Lonnie Palelei
- Les Palmer
- Joe Panos
- Vince Papale
- Artimus Parker
- Juqua Parker
- Rodney Parker
- Cody Parkey
- Will Parks
- Jim Parmer
- Josh Parry
- Zach Pascal
- Marcus Paschal
- Gordon Paschka
- Dan Pastorini
- Rupert Pate
- Dimitri Patterson
- Mike Patterson
- Cliff Patton
- Jerry Patton
- Ken Payne
- Clarence Peaks
- Doug Pederson
- Rodney Peete
- Bob Pellegrini
- Jairo Penaranda
- Rashaad Penny
- Woody Peoples
- Joshua Perkins
- Petey Perot
- Mike Perrino
- Bruce Perry
- William Perry
- Floyd Peters
- Jason Peters
- Volney Peters
- Will Peterson
- Gary Pettigrew
- Gerry Philbin
- Jaelan Phillips
- Ray Phillips (born 1954)
- Ray Phillips (born 1964)
- Bob Picard
- Kenny Pickett
- Ross Pierschbacher
- Pete Pihos
- Joe Pilconis
- Cyril Pinder
- Todd Pinkston
- Hank Piro
- Joe Pisarcik
- Alabama Pitts
- Mike Pitts
- Joe Pivarnik
- Bruce Plummer
- Ray Poage
- Chris Polk
- Al Pollard
- Tom Polley
- Geoff Pope
- Ron Porter
- Phil Poth
- Art Powell
- Jordan Poyer
- Shaun Prater
- Steve Preece
- Hal Prescott
- Bob Priestley
- Nick Prisco
- Bosh Pritchard
- Stanley Pritchett
- Chris Prosinski
- Matt Pryor
- Garry Puetz
- Bob Pylman
- Jim Pyne

== Q ==
- Elijah Qualls
- Mike Quick
- Bill Quinlan
- Robert Quinn

== R ==
- George Rado
- Phil Ragazzo
- Knox Ramsey
- LaJuan Ramsey
- Nate Ramsey
- Red Ramsey
- Lou Rash
- Leo Raskowski
- Don Ratliff
- Ryan Rau
- John Rauch
- Sam Rayburn
- Jimmy Raye II
- Jamie Reader
- Frank Reagan
- Jalen Reagor
- Montae Reagor
- John Reaves
- Dave Recher
- Haason Reddick
- James Reed
- J. R. Reed
- Mike Reed
- Taft Reed
- Hank Reese
- Ike Reese
- Ken Reeves
- Marion Reeves
- Mike Reichenbach
- Jerry Reichow
- Alan Reid
- Mike Reid
- Kevin Reilly
- Leonard Renfro
- Will Renfro
- Jay Repko
- Joe Restic
- Pete Retzlaff
- Ray Reutt
- Dallas Reynolds
- Ed Reynolds
- LaRoy Reynolds
- Jim Ricca
- Denzel Rice
- Bobby Richards
- Jess Richardson
- Paul Richardson
- Eli Ricks
- Hassan Ridgeway
- Dick Riffle
- Duke Riley
- Elijah Riley
- Lee Riley
- Dave Rimington
- Jim Ringo
- Kelee Ringo
- Ray Rissmiller
- Jon Ritchie
- Joe Robb
- Jack Roberts
- Nickell Robey
- Jacque Robinson
- Jerry Robinson
- Patrick Robinson
- Ramzee Robinson
- Ty Robinson
- Wayne Robinson
- Burle Robison
- Bradley Roby
- Sav Rocca
- Isaiah Rodgers
- Richard Rodgers
- Dominique Rodgers-Cromartie
- Bill Roffler
- John Rogalla
- Dan Rogas
- Brian Rolle
- Bill Romanowski
- Ray Romero
- Dedrick Roper
- John Roper
- Ken Rose
- Alvin Ross
- John Ross
- Tim Rossovich
- Allen Rossum
- Herb Roton
- Tom Roussel
- Ev Rowan
- Bob Rowe
- Eric Rowe
- Mark Royals
- Joe Rudolph
- Max Runager
- Jon Runyan
- Anthony Rush
- Booker Russell
- Jim Russell
- Lafayette Russell
- Rusty Russell
- Roger Ruzek
- Pat Ryan
- Rocky Ryan
- DeMeco Ryans
- Paul Ryczek
- Mark Rypien

== S ==
- Steve Sader
- Tom Saidock
- Andre' Sam
- Lawrence Sampleton
- Michael Samson
- Asante Samuel
- Mark Sanchez
- Deac Sanders
- Jack Sanders
- Miles Sanders
- Thomas Sanders
- Dan Sandifer
- Theron Sapp
- George Savitsky
- James Saxon
- Orlando Scandrick
- Joe Scarpati
- Mike Schad
- Don Schaefer
- Ryan Schau
- Owen Schmitt
- Ted Schmitt
- Bob Schnelker
- Matt Schobel
- Jim Schrader
- Adam Schreiber
- Jake Schuehle
- Elbie Schultz
- Jody Schulz
- John Sciarra
- Steve Sciullo
- Boston Scott
- Clyde Scott
- Gari Scott
- Jake Scott
- Josiah Scott
- Tom Scott
- Ben Scotti
- Leon Seals
- Vic Sears
- Mark Seay
- Mike Sebastian
- Rob Selby
- Andrew Sendejo
- Trey Sermon
- Isaac Seumalo
- Kevon Seymour
- Bob Shann
- Ed Sharkey
- Harry Shaub
- Ricky Shaw
- Lito Sheppard
- Allie Sherman
- Heath Sherman
- Will Shipley
- Abe Shires
- John Shonk
- Jason Short
- Mickey Shuler
- Mike Siano
- Vai Sikahema
- Josh Sills
- John Simerson
- Clyde Simmons
- Corey Simon
- Mark Simoneau
- David Sims
- Ernie Sims
- Kaseem Sinceno
- Michael Sinclair
- Reggie Singletary
- Alex Singleton
- Arryn Siposs
- Jerry Sisemore
- Manny Sistrunk
- Jim Skaggs
- Leo Skladany
- Tom Skladany
- Mark Slater
- Darius Slay
- Henry Slay
- Jeremy Slechta
- Jessie Small
- Torrance Small
- Fred Smalls
- Wendell Smallwood
- Rod Smart
- Rudy Smeja
- Alex Smith
- Ainias Smith
- Ben Smith
- Bob Smith
- Brad Smith
- Brandon Smith
- Charlie Smith
- C. J. Smith
- Darrin Smith
- Daryle Smith
- DeVonta Smith
- Dick Smith
- Ed Smith
- J. D. Smith
- Jack Smith (born 1917)
- Jack Smith (born 1947)
- John Smith
- L. J. Smith
- Marcus Smith
- Milt Smith
- Nolan Smith
- Otis Smith
- Phil Smith
- Ralph Smith
- Rashad Smith
- Ray Smith
- Ron Smith
- Steve Smith (born 1944)
- Steve Smith (born 1985)
- Torrey Smith
- Troy Smith
- Wade Smith
- Za'Darius Smith
- David Smukler
- Norm Snead
- Lum Snyder
- John Sodaski
- Freddie Solomon
- Ron Solt
- George Somers
- Isaac Sopoaga
- Stephen Spach
- John Spagnola
- Akeem Spence
- Takeo Spikes
- Ray Spillers
- Darren Sproles
- Damion Square
- Jack Stackpool
- Siran Stacy
- Dick Stafford
- Duce Staley
- Donté Stallworth
- Ernie Steele
- Tyler Steen
- Dick Steere
- Larry Steinbach
- Gil Steinke
- Bill Stetz
- Dick Stevens
- Don Stevens
- JaCoby Stevens
- Matt Stevens
- Peter P. Stevens
- Dean Steward
- Tony Stewart
- Walt Stickel
- Mule Stockton
- Jack Stoll
- Ed Storm
- Thomas Strauthers
- Kentavius Street
- Bill Stribling
- Donald Strickland
- Bill Striegel
- Bob Stringer
- Danny Stubbs
- Cecil Sturgeon
- Caleb Sturgis
- Jerry Sturm
- Nate Sudfeld
- Bob Suffridge
- Leo Sugar
- Ndamukong Suh
- Chandon Sullivan
- Tom Sullivan
- Tre Sullivan
- Len Supulski
- Joe Sutton
- Mitch Sutton
- Josh Sweat
- D'Andre Swift
- Justin Swift
- Jeff Sydner
- Len Szafaryn
- Frank Szymanski

== T ==
- Dan Talcott
- George Taliaferro
- Ben Tamburello
- Thomas Tapeh
- Darryl Tapp
- George Tarasovic
- John Tarver
- Carl Taseff
- Golden Tate
- Junior Tautalatasi
- Terry Tautolo
- Bobby Taylor
- Davion Taylor
- John Teltschik
- Matt Tennant
- Daniel Te'o-Nesheim
- Al Thacker
- Hollis Thomas
- Johnny Thomas
- Tra Thomas
- William Thomas
- Bobby Thomason
- Jeff Thomason
- Stumpy Thomason
- Broderick Thompson
- Don Thompson
- Russ Thompson
- Tommy Thompson
- Art Thoms
- Cedric Thornton
- Dick Thornton
- James Thrash
- Jim Thrower
- Bob Thurbon
- Walter Thurmond
- Michael Timpson
- Scott Tinsley
- Matt Tobin
- Pago Togafau
- Noah Togiai
- Mel Tom
- Lou Tomasetti
- Anthony Toney
- Casey Toohill
- Bob Torrey
- Brett Toth
- Greg Townsend
- John Tracey
- Bryce Treggs
- Greg Tremble
- Milt Trost
- Jeremiah Trotter
- Jeremiah Trotter Jr.
- Casey Tucker
- Matthew Tucker
- Marlon Tuipulotu
- Stephen Tulloch
- Jeff Tupper
- Guy Turnbow
- Kevin Turner
- Paul Turner
- Willie Turral
- Rick Tuten
- Joe Tyrrell

== U ==
- Josh Uche
- Mike Ulmer
- Morris Unutoa
- Tuufuli Uperesa
- C. J. Uzomah

== V ==
- Destiny Vaeao
- Halapoulivaati Vaitai
- Zack Valentine
- Steve Vallos
- Norm Van Brocklin
- Ebert Van Buren
- Steve Van Buren
- Julian Vandervelde
- Alex Van Dyke
- Bruce Van Dyke
- Ben VanSumeren
- Arunas Vasys
- Michael Vick
- Roger Vick
- Kary Vincent Jr.
- Troy Vincent
- Kimo von Oelhoffen

== W ==
- Steve Wagner
- Frank Wainright
- Billy Walik
- Adam Walker
- Corey Walker
- Darwin Walker
- Herschel Walker
- Joe Walker
- Jamar Wall
- Al Wallace
- K'Von Wallace
- Mike Wallace
- Bobby Walston
- Pete Walters
- Stan Walters
- John Walton
- Prince Tega Wanogho
- Greg Ward
- Jim Ward
- Matt Ware
- Chance Warmack
- Buzz Warren
- Chris Warren
- Andre Waters
- Mike Waters
- Danny Watkins
- Foster Watkins
- Jaylen Watkins
- Larry Watkins
- Quez Watkins
- Eddie Watson
- Terrell Watson
- Tim Watson
- Ricky Watters
- Nate Wayne
- Bob Wear
- Jim Weatherall
- Jed Weaver
- Leonard Weaver
- Chuck Weber
- Don Weedon
- Ted Wegert
- Reds Weiner
- Izzy Weinstock
- John Welbourn
- Billy Wells
- Harold Wells
- Reggie Wells
- Joe Wendlick
- Carson Wentz
- Jeff Wenzel
- Burr West
- Ed West
- Troy West
- Brian Westbrook
- Jim Whalen
- Markus Wheaton
- Mark Wheeler
- Jodie Whire
- Allie White
- Kyzir White
- Reggie White
- Tracy White
- Brandon Whiting
- David Whitmore
- Fred Whittingham
- Barry Wilburn
- John Wilcox
- Reggie Wilkes
- Jeff Wilkins
- Erwin Will
- Norm Willey
- Ben Williams
- Bernard Williams
- Bobbie Williams
- Boyd Williams
- Calvin Williams
- Cameron Williams
- Cary Williams
- Charles Williams
- Clyde Williams
- Gizmo Williams
- Jason Williams
- Jerry Williams
- Joel Williams
- Michael Williams
- Milton Williams
- Raequan Williams
- Ted Williams
- Tex Williams
- Trevor Williams
- Tyrone Williams
- James Willis
- Diddie Willson
- Billy Wilson
- Brenard Wilson
- Caleb Wilson
- Eric Wilson
- Harry Wilson
- Jerry Wilson
- Johnny Wilson
- Marvin Wilson
- Vernon Winfield
- Dean Wink
- Dennis Wirgowski
- Stefen Wisniewski
- Al Wistert
- Derrick Witherspoon
- Will Witherspoon
- John Wittenborn
- Alex Wojciechowicz
- Earl Wolff
- Clem Woltman
- Marc Woodard
- Tom Woodeshick
- Lee Woodruff
- Tony Woodruff
- Neil Worden
- Mike Woulfe
- Gordon Wright
- Sylvester Wright
- Al Wukits
- Antwuan Wyatt
- Frank Wydo
- John Wyhonic
- Dexter Wynn
- Will Wynn

== Y ==
- Adrian Young
- Byron Young
- Charle Young
- Glen Young
- Mike Young
- Roynell Young
- Scott Young
- Vince Young
- Sid Youngelman
- John Yovicsin

== Z ==
- Steve Zabel
- Olamide Zaccheaus
- Mike Zandofsky
- Luis Zendejas
- Frank Ziegler
- Jack Zilly
- Don Zimmerman
- Roy Zimmerman
- Vince Zizak
- Eric Zomalt
- Mike Zordich
- Jim Zyntell
