= EFSD =

EFSD may refer to:

- European Foundation for the Study of Diabetes, a foundation created by the European Association for the Study of Diabetes (EASD)
- Elizabeth Forward School District, in Elizabeth, Pennsylvania, United States
- Education for sustainable development, EfSD
- Eurasian Fund for Stabilization and Development (former EURASEC Anti-crisis Fund), a fund of the Eurasian Development Bank
