= Jim Brumfield =

American football player (born 1947)

No. 36
- Position: Running back

Personal information
- Born: September 4, 1947 (age 79); Osyka, Mississippi, U.S.
- Listed height: 6 ft 1 in (1.85 m)
- Listed weight: 195 lb (88 kg)

Career information
- High school: Elizabeth Forward (PA)
- College: Indiana State
- NFL draft: 1970: 10th round, 244th overall pick

Career history
- Pittsburgh Steelers (1971)

Career NFL statistics
- Kickoff returns: 14
- Return yards: 271
- Games played: 14
- Stats at Pro Football Reference

James I. Brumfield (born September 4, 1947) is an American former professional football player who was a running back for one season with the Pittsburgh Steelers of the National Football League (NFL). He played college football for the Indiana State Sycamores. Brumfield was selected in the 10th round of the 1970 NFL draft with the 244th overall pick. by the New Orleans Saints.
