= Joe Carpe =

American football player (1903–1977)

No. 14, 12, 17
- Position: Halfback

Personal information
- Born: January 23, 1903; Westville, Illinois, U.S.
- Died: November 3, 1977 (aged 74); Quincy, Massachusetts, U.S.
- Listed height: 6 ft 0 in (1.83 m)
- Listed weight: 197 lb (89 kg)

Career information
- College: Millikin University

Career history
- Frankford Yellow Jackets (1926); Pottsville Maroons (1927–1928); Boston Bulldogs (1929); Philadelphia Eagles (1933)

Awards and highlights
- NFL champion (1926); An Original Member of the Philadelphia Eagles
- Stats at Pro Football Reference

Joseph A. Carpe (January 23, 1903 – November 3, 1977) was a professional football player in the early National Football League (NFL). A native of Westville, Illinois, Carpe attended Millikin University. He made his NFL debut in 1926 with the Frankford Yellow Jackets. That year, he was a member of the Yellow Jackets NFL Championship team. He also played for the Pottsville Maroons, Boston Bulldogs, and was an original member of the Philadelphia Eagles.
