= Elizabeth Forward High School =

Coordinates: 40.255°N 79.856°W

- 1000 Weigles Hill Rd. Elizabeth, Pennsylvania, U.S.

Information
- Teaching staff: 53.58 (FTE)
- Grades: 9-12
- Enrollment: 744 (2023–2024)
- Student to teacher ratio: 13.89
- Campus type: Rural
- Colors: Red and Black
- Mascot: Warrior
- Website: https://www.efsd.net/

Elizabeth Forward High School is a midsized suburban, four-year comprehensive public high school located in Elizabeth, Pennsylvania, as part of the Elizabeth Forward School District.

== Fire ==
On February 12, 2023, the school caught on fire, causing extensive damage in the auditorium side of the building, and causing smoke, water, and fire damage throughout the majority of the building. Students returned to school on April 11, 2023.

== Location ==
Elizabeth Forward School District is composed of the Borough of Elizabeth, and the townships of Elizabeth and Forward. Located just south of the city of Pittsburgh, the district lies between the Youghiogheny River and Monongahela River valleys in the southernmost region of Allegheny County. Communities of Elizabeth Township include Greenock, Mount Vernon, Central, Boston, Buena Vista, Industry, Blaine Hill, Blythedale, Smithdale and Victory. Communities of Forward Township include East Monongahela, Bunola, Sunny Side, River Hill, 51 Estates, and Axelton. Bordering areas include McKeesport, Pleasant Hills, Belle Vernon, Monongahela, West Mifflin, Jefferson Borough, West Elizabeth, and Versailles.

== Extracurriculars ==
The school offers a variety of clubs and activities.

=== Marching band ===
Elizabeth Forward has a marching band that competes regularly, there is also an Indoor Color Guard. The Indoor Percussion Ensemble finished its season by winning gold in the Scholastic A Percussion Standstill Division at the Tournament Indoor Association Championships in 2011. Additionally, the school's Indoor Majorettes. The group took first place and was named Scholastic A Class Champion at the 2011 Tournament Indoor Association Chapter 8 Championships. The main marching band took 2nd place at the Tournament of Bands. They then went on to compete in Altoona for the main 1st place spot but didn't succeed. The booster group is extensive and very active in fund raising.

=== Athletics ===
School sponsored athletics include

Fall Sports

- Cross Country
- Football
- Soccer
- Volleyball
- Golf
- Marching Band
- Color Guard

Winter Sports

- Basketball
- Hockey
- Indoor Track
- Indoor Color Guard
- Indoor Percussion Ensemble
- Swimming/Diving
- Wrestling
- Hockey

Spring Sports

- Baseball
- Track & Field
- Softball

=== Rivalries ===
Elizabeth Forward has several rivalries with other local school districts. The most notable rivalry is with Thomas Jefferson High School. This rivalry is fueled through nearly every sport. Another major rivalry is with Belle Vernon Area High School. Another minor rivalry that has died down is West Mifflin Area High School.

=== Theater ===
The Elizabeth Forward Theater Arts Department has put on numerous productions through its active years and is renowned throughout the Elizabeth and Pittsburgh communities. Notable productions include Legally Blonde: The Musical, Mamma Mia!, The Drowsy Chaperone, Little Shop of Horrors, The Hunchback of Notre Dame, Big Fish, Hadestown Teen Edition, and most recently the Prince of Egypt. The school regularly participates in the Gene Kelly Awards, of which they won Best Musical Budget Category II three times. The department has since branched out to create the Beyond the Stage program, where community service pertaining to the present musical's themes being performed in Elizabeth.

== Notable alumni ==
- Anthony Rubino, former tackle for the Detroit Lions
- Bill Robinson, former right fielder for the Pittsburgh Pirates, New York Yankees and Philadelphia Phillies.
- Jim Brumfield, former running back for the Pittsburgh Steelers
- Greg Paterra, former running back for the Atlanta Falcons, Detroit Lions, and Buffalo Bills.
- Pete Rostosky, former offensive lineman for the Pittsburgh Steelers.
- Brian Holton, former MLB pitcher for the Baltimore Orioles and the Los Angeles Dodgers.
- Dave Molinari, writer for Pittsburgh Post-Gazette, Hockey Hall of Fame.
- J. J. Hoover, MLB relief pitcher for the Arizona Diamondbacks, Cincinnati Reds.
- Dan Altavilla, MLB pitcher for the Seattle Mariners
- Andrew Kuzma, Pennsylvania State Representative from the 39th district
