= Dan Altavilla =

American baseball player (born 1992)

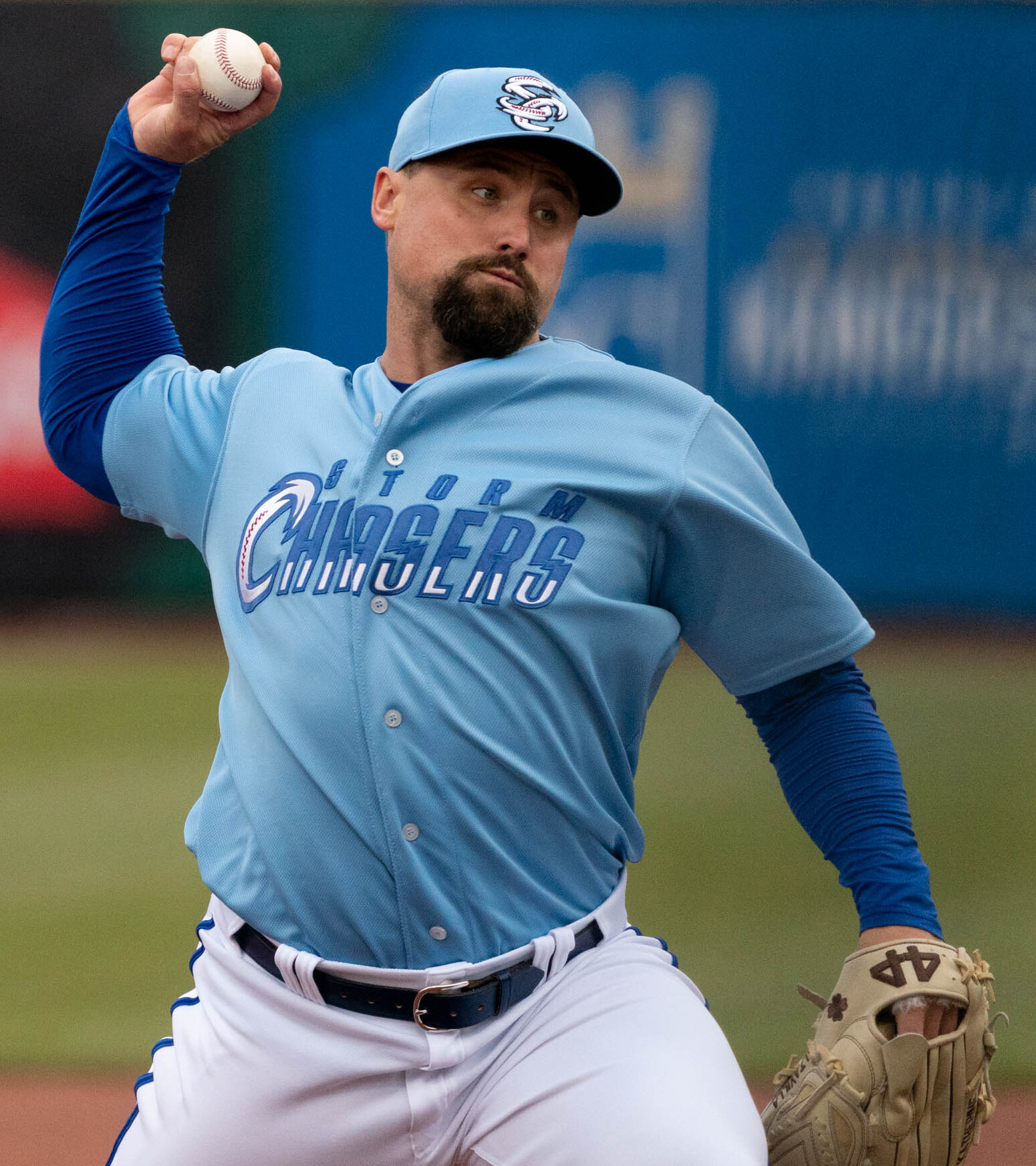
- Altavilla with the Omaha Storm Chasers in 2024

Free agent
- Pitcher
- Born: September 8, 1992 (age 33); Greenock, Pennsylvania, U.S.
- Bats: Right Throws: Right

MLB debut
- August 27, 2016, for the Seattle Mariners

MLB statistics (through 2025 season)
- Win–loss record: 8–9
- Earned run average: 4.00
- Strikeouts: 155
- Stats at Baseball Reference

Teams
- Seattle Mariners (2016–2020); San Diego Padres (2020–2021); Kansas City Royals (2024); Chicago White Sox (2025)
Medals
Men's baseball
Representing United States
WBSC Premier12
Bronze medal – third place	2024 Tokyo	Team

Daniel Altavilla (born September 8, 1992) is an American professional baseball pitcher who is a free agent. He has previously played in Major League Baseball (MLB) for the Seattle Mariners, San Diego Padres, Kansas City Royals, and Chicago White Sox.

== Amateur career ==
Altavilla attended Elizabeth Forward High School in Elizabeth, Pennsylvania, and played college baseball at Mercyhurst University. After his sophomore season in 2013, he played collegiate summer baseball for the Yarmouth–Dennis Red Sox of the Cape Cod Baseball League. As a junior at Mercyhurst, he was 9–1 with a 1.23 ERA in 12 starts, striking out a school-record 129 batters in 80.1 innings. He was drafted by the Seattle Mariners in the fifth round of the 2014 Major League Baseball draft and signed for $250,000.

== Professional career ==
=== Seattle Mariners ===
After signing, Altavilla made his professional debut that same year with the Everett AquaSox and spent the whole season there, going 5–3 with a 4.36 ERA in 14 starts. In 2015, he played for the Bakersfield Blaze where he pitched to a 6–12 record with a 4.07 ERA and 1.29 WHIP in 28 games started. He began 2016 with the Jackson Generals.

Altavilla was called up to the majors for the first time on August 27, 2016, and he made his major league debut that same night. In 43 relief appearances for Jackson prior to being recalled, he was 7–3 with 1.91 ERA. He spent the remainder of the season with Seattle, compiling a 0.73 ERA in 12.1 innings pitched.

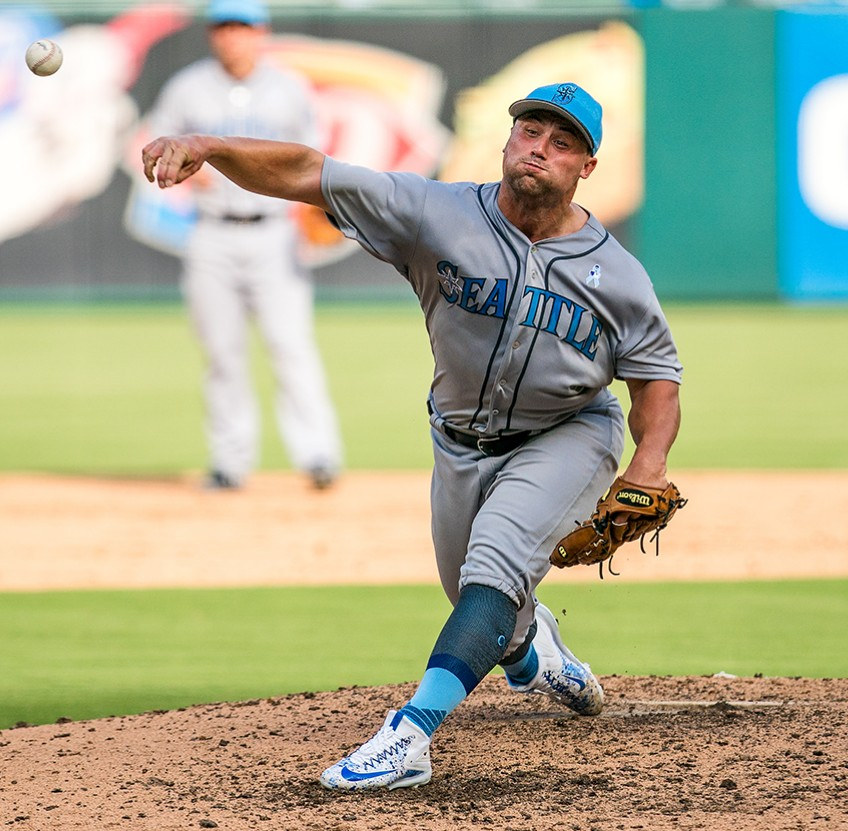
Altavilla pitching for the Seattle Mariners in 2017

Altavilla began 2017 with Seattle, but was sent down to the Tacoma Rainiers in April. He was recalled from Tacoma multiple times during the season before being recalled for the remainder of the season for September call-ups. In twenty games for Tacoma he was 2–0 with a 1.54 ERA, and in 41 games for Seattle, he was 1–1 with a 4.24 ERA. Altavilla began 2018 with Seattle but was placed on the disabled list in late April with joint inflammation. After being activated on May 12, he returned to Seattle, but was sent back down to Tacoma on May 23. He was recalled once again on May 27. He was limited to just 22 appearances in 2018 and 17 in 2019 due to injury and inconsistency.

On July 29, 2020, Altavilla recorded his first career save in a 10–7 win over the Los Angeles Angels.

=== San Diego Padres ===
On August 30, 2020, the Mariners traded Altavilla, Austin Nola, and Austin Adams to the San Diego Padres for Ty France, Taylor Trammell, Andrés Muñoz, and Luis Torrens. In 9 appearances for San Diego, Altavilla was 1–1 with a 3.12 ERA.

On April 17, 2021, Altavilla was placed on the 10-day injured list with right elbow inflammation. In two games, Altavilla recorded a 6.75 ERA. He was later transferred to the 60-day injured list on May 28. On June 29, Altavilla underwent Tommy John surgery, ending his 2021 season. On November 3, the Padres outrighted him to Triple-A. That same day, Altavilla elected free agency.

=== Boston Red Sox ===
On March 16, 2022, Altavilla was reported to have agreed to a two-year minor league contract with the Boston Red Sox; the signing was confirmed by the team on March 30. He did not make an appearance for the organization in 2022 as he continued to rehabilitate from surgery.

In 2023, Altavilla made 8 appearance split between the rookie–level Florida Complex League Red Sox and High-A Greenville Drive, posting a cumulative 3.00 ERA with seven strikeouts in 12 innings of work. On August 15, Altavilla was released by the Red Sox organization.

=== Kansas City Royals ===
On December 6, 2023, Altavilla signed a minor league contract with the Kansas City Royals that included an invitation to spring training. In 24 games for the Triple-A Omaha Storm Chasers, he recorded a 2.63 ERA with 30 strikeouts and 3 saves across 27 1/3 innings pitched. On June 10, 2024, the Royals selected Altavilla's contract, adding him to their active roster. Two days later, he made his first start for the Royals, allowing six runs while recording only one out in the first inning. He was placed on the injured list with a right oblique strain on June 20, and transferred to the 60-day injured list on July 5. On September 5, the team activated Altavilla from the IL and subsequently designated him for assignment. He cleared waivers and was sent outright to Omaha on September 7. Altavilla elected free agency on October 2.

=== Chicago White Sox ===
On December 12, 2024, Altavilla signed a minor league contract with the Chicago White Sox. On March 25, 2025, Altavilla exercised an opt-out clause in his contract and was granted his release by the White Sox. On March 30, Altavilla re-signed with the White Sox on a minor league contract. In 20 appearances for the Triple-A Charlotte Knights, he posted a 1–1 record and 2.49 ERA with 18 strikeouts and seven saves across 21 2/3 innings pitched. Altavilla was released by the White Sox on May 24. On May 30, Altavilla again re-signed with Chicago, this time on a major league contract. In 28 appearances for Chicago, he recorded a 2.48 ERA with 21 strikeouts and two saves across 29 innings of work. Altavilla was designated for assignment by the White Sox on September 10. He was released by Chicago on September 12.

=== Minnesota Twins ===
On December 17, 2025, Altavilla signed a minor league contract with the Minnesota Twins. He was assigned to the Triple-A St. Paul Saints to begin the 2026 season, registering an 0-2 record and 7.32 ERA with 19 strikeouts across 19 2/3 innings pitched. Altavilla was released by the Twins organization on May 25, 2026.

=== Kansas City Royals (second stint) ===
On May 29, 2026, Altavilla signed a minor league contract with the Kansas City Royals. He made 20 relief appearances for the Triple–A Omaha Storm Chasers, compiling a 3–2 record and 5.11 ERA with 17 strikeouts across 24 2/3 innings pitched. On August 6, Altavilla was released by the Royals after exercising the opt–out clause in his contract.

== International career ==
Altavilla pitched for the United States national baseball team at the 2024 WBSC Premier12, allowing a home run for his only run in 5 1/3 innings.

Altavilla was added to the Italy national team roster for the 2026 World Baseball Classic.
