= Greg Paterra =

American football player (born 1967)

No. 36
- Position: Running back

Personal information
- Born: May 12, 1967 (age 59); McKeesport, Pennsylvania, U.S.
- Listed height: 5 ft 11 in (1.80 m)
- Listed weight: 211 lb (96 kg)

Career information
- High school: Forward (Elizabeth, Pennsylvania)
- College: Harford CC (1985); Slippery Rock (1986–1988)
- NFL draft: 1989: 11th round, 286th overall pick

Career history
- Atlanta Falcons (1989); Detroit Lions (1990)*; Buffalo Bills (1991); → Montreal Machine (1992); Buffalo Bills (1992–1994)*
- * Offseason or practice squad member only

Awards and highlights
- Second-team Little All-American (1988)

Career NFL statistics
- Rushing yards: 32
- Rushing average: 3.6
- Receptions: 5
- Receiving yards: 42
- Stats at Pro Football Reference

Gregory Richard Paterra (born May 12, 1967) is an American former professional football player who was a running back for one season with the Atlanta Falcons of the National Football League (NFL). He was selected by the Falcons in the eleventh round of the 1989 NFL draft. He played college football at Harford Community College and Slippery Rock University. He was also a member of the Detroit Lions and Buffalo Bills.

== Early life ==
Gregory Richard Paterra was born on May 12, 1967, in McKeesport, Pennsylvania. He played high school football at Elizabeth Forward High School in Elizabeth, Pennsylvania. He ran for over 3,000 yards and scored more than 30 touchdowns in high school, ending his high school career as Elizabeth Forward's all-time leading rusher and scorer.

== College career ==
Paterra first played college football at Harford Community College in 1985 due to poor grades. Harford ended its football program after Paterra's freshman year.

Paterra was then a three-year letterman at Slippery Rock University from 1986 to 1988. He rushed for 3,149 yards, caught 43 passes for 484 yards, and scored 31 touchdowns during his time at Slippery Rock. As a senior in 1988, he earned second-team Little All-America honors and finished tied for fifth in voting for the Harlon Hill Trophy, given to the best football player in NCAA Division II.

== Professional career ==
Paterra was selected by the Atlanta Falcons in the 11th round, with the 286th overall pick, of the 1989 NFL draft. He officially signed with the team on July 18. He was released on September 5 but signed to the practice squad the next day. Paterra was promoted to the active roster on October 21 and played in ten games for the Falcons during the 1989 season, recording nine carries for 32 yards, five catches for 42 yards, and eight kick returns for 129 yards.

On August 21, 1990, Paterra was traded to the Detroit Lions for an undisclosed 1991 draft pick. He was released on September 3, re-signed the next day, and released again on September 10, 1990.

Paterra signed with the Buffalo Bills on April 11, 1991. He was placed on injured reserve on July 14 and spent the entire year there. He became a free agent after the 1991 season. He re-signed with the Bills on February 20, 1992. The Bills allocated Paterra to the World League of American Football (WLAF) to play for the Montreal Machine during the 1992 WLAF season. He suffered a broken hand in August 1992 during a Bills preseason game and was later released with an injury settlement on August 25, 1992. Paterra signed with the Bills again on March 17, 1993. He released once again on August 24, 1993, after being beat out by Carwell Gardner and Nate Turner. He signed with the Bills for the fourth year in a row on April 15, 1994. On July 22, 1994, it was reported that Patera had retired due to shoulder and back problems.

== Personal life ==
Paterra is the nephew of football player and coach Herb Paterra. His daughter Tori Paterra participated in cross country at Miami University and daughter Andrea Paterra participated in track at West Virginia Wesleyan College.

Paterra was also an assistant coach at his alma mater, Elizabeth Forward High School, and worked for the Pennsylvania Turnpike.
