= 1971 All-Southwest Conference football team =

American college football all-star team

The 1971 All-Southwest Conference football team consists of American football players chosen by various organizations for All-Southwest Conference teams for the 1971 NCAA University Division football season. The selectors for the 1971 season included the Associated Press (AP).

== All Southwest selections ==
=== Offense ===
==== Quarterbacks ====
- Joe Ferguson, Arkansas (AP-1)
- Steve Judy, TCU (AP-2)

==== Running backs ====
- Jim Bertelsen, Texas (AP-1)
- Stahle Vincent, Rice (AP-1)
- Alvin Maxson, SMU (AP-1)
- Bobby Davis, TCU (AP-2)
- Mark Green, Texas A&M (AP-2)
- Dickey Morton, Arkansas (AP-2)

==== Split ends ====
- Mike Reppond, Arkansas (AP-1)
- Johnny Odom, Texas Tech (AP-2)

==== Tight ends ====
- Ronnie Peoples, TCU (AP-1)
- Homer May, Texas A&M (AP-2)

==== Tackles ====
- Jerry Sisemore, Texas (AP-1)
- Mike Kelson, Arkansas (AP-1)
- Tom Mabry, Arkansas (AP-2)
- Buster Callaway, Texas A&M (AP-2)

==== Guards ====
- Don Crosslin, Texas (AP-1)
- Leonard Forey, Texas A&M (AP-1)
- Tom Reed, Arkansas (AP-2)
- Glen Lowe, Arkansas (AP-2)

==== Centers ====
- Ron Revard, Arkansas (AP-1)
- Russel Ingram, Texas Tech (AP-2)

=== Defense ===
==== Defensive ends ====
- Ronnie Jones, Arkansas (AP-1)
- Roger Goree, Baylor (AP-1)
- Malcolm Minnick, Texas (AP-2)
- Gary Martinec, TCU (AP-2)
- Larry Walling, Rice (AP-2)

==== Defensive tackles ====
- Greg Ploetz, Texas (AP-1)
- Ray Dowdy, Texas (AP-1)
- Van Odom, Texas A&M (AP-2)
- Boice Best, Texas A&M (AP-2)

==== Linebackers ====
- Randy Braband, Texas (AP-1)
- Danny Rhodes, Arkansas (AP-1)
- Larry Molinare, Texas Tech (AP-1)
- Rodrigo Barnes, Rice (AP-2)
- Don Rives, Texas Tech (AP-2)
- Glen Gaspard, Texas (AP-2)

==== Defensive backs ====
- Marc Dove, Texas Tech (AP-1)
- Robert Popelka, SMU (AP-1)
- Alan Lowry, Texas (AP-1)
- David Hoot, Texas A&M (AP-1)
- Pat Curry, SMU (AP-2)
- Brad Dusek, Texas A&M (AP-2)
- Lyle Blackwood, TCU (AP-2)
- Phil Beall, Baylor (AP-2)

== Key ==
AP = Associated Press

CFHOF = Player inducted into the College Football Hall of Fame

== See also ==
- 1971 College Football All-America Team
