= Brad Dusek =

American football player (1950–2024)

No. 59
- Position: Linebacker

Personal information
- Born: December 13, 1950; Temple, Texas, U.S.
- Died: June 10, 2024 (aged 73)
- Listed height: 6 ft 2 in (1.88 m)
- Listed weight: 220 lb (100 kg)

Career information
- High school: Temple
- College: Texas A&M
- NFL draft: 1973: 3rd round, 56th overall pick

Career history
- Washington Redskins (1974–1981)

Awards and highlights
- Super Bowl champion (XVII); Second-team All-SWC (1971)

Career NFL statistics
- Interceptions: 4
- Fumble recoveries: 16
- Touchdowns: 3
- Stats at Pro Football Reference

John Bradley Dusek (December 13, 1950 – June 10, 2024) was an American professional football linebacker for the Washington Redskins of the National Football League (NFL) from 1974 to 1981. He played college football for the Texas A&M Aggies.

== Early life ==
Dusek was born in Longview, Texas, in 1950. His father and older brother played gridiron football for Temple High School in Temple, Texas, and the former for Texas A&M University.

== Career ==
Dusek attended Temple High School and played for its football team as a quarterback and safety. He was selected Parade All-American as a senior. He then enrolled at Texas A&M University and played Texas A&M Aggies football from 1969 to 1972 as a fullback in its wishbone offense. He was named to the 1971 All-Southwest Conference football team and was the Aggies' team captain in 1972.

The New England Patriots of the National Football League (NFL) selected Dusek as linebacker in the third round and 56th pick of the 1973 NFL draft. They traded him to the Washington Redskins for Donnell Smith, with whom he played 114 games from 1974 to 1981, 97 as a starter. He had 16 fumble recoveries (including three returned for touchdowns), 14 sacks, four interceptions and three touchdowns. He made over 100 tackles in the 1977, 1978 and 1979 seasons. Michael Richman, in The Redskins Encyclopedia, called him "one of the best outside linebackers in Redskins history".

== Later life ==
Dusek had four children. After football, he built homes.

Dusek was inducted into the Texas A&M Athletic Hall of Fame in 2014 and the Texas High School Football Hall of Fame in 2018.

Dusek was diagnosed with amyotrophic lateral sclerosis (ALS) in September 2018 and declared an "ALS Hero" in 2020 by the Texas Chapter of the ALS Association. He died on June 10, 2024, at the age of 73.
