= Elizabeth Forward School District =

School district in Pennsylvania

Coordinates: 40.24913°N 79.85137°W

Location
- Elizabeth, PA United States

District information
- Type: Public School District

Students and staff
- Colors: red and black

Other information
- Website: http://www.efsd.net/

The Elizabeth Forward School District is a small, suburban public school district covering the Borough of Elizabeth and the townships of Elizabeth and Forward Townships in Allegheny County, Pennsylvania. The district is located approximately 35 minutes south-east of the city of Pittsburgh and lies between the Yough and Monongahela river valleys in the southernmost region of Allegheny County. Elizabeth Forward School District encompasses approximately 35 square miles. According to 2000 federal census data, it serves a resident population of 19,210. In 2009, the districts residents' per capita income was $20,424, while the median family income was $48,671. The schools football team and other school sports is called the Warriors and the colors are red and black. The school district is located in Elizabeth Pennsylvania. The Elizabeth Elementary closed in 2010.

The district operates six schools:

- Elizabeth Forward High School (9th-12th) Made AYP
- Elizabeth Forward Middle School (6th-8th) Made AYP
- Central Elementary School - Grades 1st-5 Made AYP Report Card 2010
- Greenock Elementary School - Grades K-2 Report Card 2010
- Mt. Vernon Elementary School - Grades 3-5 Made AYP Report Card 2010
- William Penn Elementary Schools Elementary School - Grades K-5 Made AYP Report Card 2010

Elizabeth Learning Center - Former Elizabeth Elementary School - Multi uses building - Alternative education, Preschool/Head Start operated by the Allegheny Intermediate Unit, adult education programs.
