= Mike Reppond =

American football player (1951–2023)

No. 81
- Position: Wide receiver

Personal information
- Born: August 24, 1951; San Diego, California, U.S.
- Died: October 31, 2023 (aged 72)
- Listed height: 5 ft 11 in (1.80 m)
- Listed weight: 179 lb (81 kg)

Career information
- High school: Parkwood
- College: Arkansas
- NFL draft: 1973: 9th round, 215th overall pick

Career history
- Buffalo Bills (1973)*; Chicago Bears (1973); Chicago Fire (1974)
- * Offseason or practice squad member only

Awards and highlights
- First-team All-SWC (1971)
- Stats at Pro Football Reference

Michael Gene Reppond (August 24, 1951 – October 31, 2023) was an American professional football wide receiver. He played two games for the Chicago Bears in 1973. He played college football at the University of Arkansas. He also played one season in the World Football League (WFL) for the Chicago Fire.

Reppond died on October 31, 2023, at the age of 72.
