= Reggie Rust =

American football player (1909–1984)

Profile
- Position: Running back

Personal information
- Born: May 23, 1909; Santa Barbara, California, U.S.
- Died: January 11, 1984 (aged 74); Arroyo Grande, California, U.S.

Career information
- College: Oregon State

Career history
- Boston Braves (1932)
- Stats at Pro Football Reference

Reginald Porter Rust (May 23, 1909 – January 11, 1984) was an American football running back in the National Football League (NFL) for the Boston Braves. He played college football at Oregon State University.
