= Don Rives =

American football player (born 1951)

No. 57
- Position: Linebacker

Personal information
- Born: August 30, 1951 (age 75); Wheeler, Texas, U.S.
- Listed height: 6 ft 2 in (1.88 m)
- Listed weight: 225 lb (102 kg)

Career information
- High school: Wheeler
- College: Texas Tech
- NFL draft: 1973: 15th round, 370th overall pick

Career history
- Chicago Bears (1973–1978)

Awards and highlights
- Second-team All-American (1972); Second-team All-SWC (1971)

Career NFL statistics
- Games played - started: 74 - 33
- Interceptions: 2
- Fumble recoveries: 6
- Stats at Pro Football Reference

Donald Earl Rives (/riːvs/ REEVS; born August 30, 1951) is an American former professional football player who was a linebacker for five seasons with the Chicago Bears of the National Football League (NFL). He played college football for the Texas Tech Red Raiders under coach Jim Carlen. Rives was inducted into the Red Raider Athletic Hall of Honor in 2006. He was named second-team All American in 1972. He graduated from Texas Tech University in 1974.
