= Dick Smith (offensive lineman) =

American football player (1912–1980)

Profile
- Positions: Center, end

Personal information
- Born: January 29, 1912; East Chicago, Indiana, U.S.
- Died: April 5, 1980; New Canaan, Connecticut

Career information
- College: Ohio State

Career history
- 1933: Boston Redskins
- 1933: Chicago Bears
- 1933: Philadelphia Eagles
- Stats at Pro Football Reference

Richard Scott Smith (January 29, 1912 – April 5, 1980) was an American football offensive lineman in the National Football League (NFL) for the Boston Redskins, Chicago Bears, and the Philadelphia Eagles. He played college football at Ohio State University.
