= Pete Rostosky =

American football player (born 1961)

No. 63
- Position: Offensive tackle

Personal information
- Born: July 29, 1961 (age 65); Monongahela, Pennsylvania, U.S.
- Listed height: 6 ft 4 in (1.93 m)
- Listed weight: 259 lb (117 kg)

Career information
- High school: Elizabeth Forward (Elizabeth, Pennsylvania)
- College: UConn
- NFL draft: 1983: undrafted

Career history
- Pittsburgh Steelers (1983–1986)

Career NFL statistics
- Games played: 35
- Games started: 8
- Stats at Pro Football Reference

Pete Rostosky (born July 29, 1961) is an American former professional football player who was an offensive tackle for the Pittsburgh Steelers of the National Football League (NFL) from 1984 through 1986. He played college football for the UConn Huskies.

Rostosky attended the University of Connecticut, graduating in 1983. During his professional career he played in 35 games, starting eight. He was part of the team that advanced to the 1984 AFC Championship Game versus the Miami Dolphins. He returned one kickoff for three yards in 1986. He wore uniform number 63. He currently resides in Canonsburg, Pennsylvania. Rostosky was the head coach of the football team at Elizabeth Forward High School.
