= Terry Randolph =

American football player (born 1955)

No. 23
- Position: Cornerback

Personal information
- Born: July 17, 1955 (age 71); New York City, New York, U.S.
- Listed height: 6 ft 0 in (1.83 m)
- Listed weight: 184 lb (83 kg)

Career information
- High school: Samuel J. Tilden (Brooklyn, New York)
- College: American International (1973–1976)
- NFL draft: 1977: 11th round, 290th overall pick

Career history
- Green Bay Packers (1977–1978); New York Jets (1979)*
- * Offseason or practice squad member only

Career NFL statistics
- Games played: 14
- Stats at Pro Football Reference

Terry Randolph (born July 17, 1955) is an American former professional football player who was a cornerback in the National Football League (NFL). He played college football for the American International Yellow Jackets, where he was a two-time All-New England selection. He then was selected by the Green Bay Packers in the 11th round of the 1977 NFL draft and played that season with them before being released prior to the 1978 season. Randolph later had a brief stint with the New York Jets in 1979 before ending his career.

== Early life ==
Randolph was born on July 17, 1955, in New York City. He is the brother of Major League Baseball (MLB) player Willie Randolph. The two brothers played baseball growing up and Terry said that Willie "was always better than me." He noted that he "wasn't a good hitter" and quit the sport in favor of track and field; then he switched to football. The two Randolphs attended Samuel J. Tilden High School in Brooklyn, New York; Terry was a quarterback in football and was teammates with his brother for one year, although Willie focused on baseball. Terry Randolph is one of six Samuel J. Tilden alumni to play in the NFL.

== College career ==
Randolph began attending American International College in 1973 and was a four-year starter in football. He is one of only eight players in the school's history to play in the NFL. From 1973 to 1975, Randolph played as a safety, earning All-New England honors. His position was changed to running back as a senior in 1976 and he earned All-New England honors after running for over 900 yards; he led New England in rushing, scoring and in kick return yards while also seeing time at return specialist. Randolph was named the President's Cup winner as the top senior athlete at American International.

== Professional career ==
Randolph was selected in the 11th round (290th overall) of the 1977 NFL draft by the Green Bay Packers, being their final selection the draft. He was converted to cornerback, a position he had never played before, upon joining the team. Despite facing an "uphill battle" due to his low draft selection and new position, Randolph was able to make the final roster. He made his NFL debut against the New Orleans Saints in week 1 and went on to appear in every game for the Packers over the 1977 season, mainly being used as a special teams player as the Packers went 4–10.

Randolph was released on August 22, 1978. As the 1978 season progressed, he had tryouts with the New York Jets, New England Patriots and New York Giants, but went unsigned by each. He was later signed by the Jets in May 1979. He was waived/injured by the Jets on August 21 that year. They were the last team of his career.

== Later life ==
Randolph was inducted into the American International Athletics Hall of Fame in 2013.
