= Dick Thornton (American football) =

American football player (1908–1973)

No. 28
- Position: Blocking back

Personal information
- Born: February 4, 1908; Chicago, Illinois, U.S.
- Died: January 13, 1973 (aged 64); Chicago, Illinois, U.S.
- Listed height: 5 ft 6 in (1.68 m)
- Listed weight: 165 lb (75 kg)

Career information
- High school: Senn (Chicago, Illinois)
- College: Michigan; Missouri–Rolla

Career history
- Philadelphia Eagles (1933)

Career statistics
- TD–INT: 0–4
- Passing yards: 52
- Passer rating: 4.2
- Stats at Pro Football Reference

Harry Richard Thornton (February 4, 1908 – January 13, 1973) was an American football quarterback in the National Football League (NFL). He played for the Philadelphia Eagles in 1933, starting in one game. He played college football at Michigan and Missouri–Rolla.

== Early life ==
Thornton attended Senn High School in Chicago, Illinois.

== College career ==
Thornton played college football at Missouri–Rolla and Michigan.

== Professional career ==
Thornton played for the Philadelphia Eagles in 1933, playing in four games (including one start). In 1932 and 1933 he also played for the then-independent St. Louis Gunners.

== Personal ==
Thornton's son, Dick, played in the Canadian Football League from 1961 to 1972.
