= Anthony Rubino =

American football player (1921–1983)

No. 66
- Position: Guard

Personal information
- Born: June 20, 1921; Elizabeth, Pennsylvania, U.S.
- Died: November 30, 1983 (aged 62); Elizabeth, Pennsylvania, U.S.
- Listed height: 5 ft 10 in (1.78 m)
- Listed weight: 208 lb (94 kg)

Career information
- High school: Elizabeth Forward (PA)
- College: Wake Forest University

Career history
- Detroit Lions (1943 and 1946)

Career statistics
- Games: 21
- Stats at Pro Football Reference

Anthony Eugene Rubino (June 20, 1921 – November 30, 1983) was an American football player.

A native of Elizabeth, Pennsylvania, Rubino attended Elizabeth Forward High School. He played college football at Wake Forest where he was a member of Sigma Pi fraternity.

He played professional football in the National Football League (NFL) as a guard for the Detroit Lions in 1943 and 1946. He appeared in 21 NFL games, six as a starter. He served in the Navy during World War II. In 1947 he played with the Paterson Panthers of the American Association.

In 1944 and 1945, during World War II, he served with the U.S. Navy. After the war, he became a teacher and football coach in Elizabeth, Pennsylvania. He also coached football at Duquesne High School and served on the Elizabeth city council from 1966 to 1974. He died in 1983.
