= Danny Rhodes =

American football player (born 1951)

- Rhodes, circa 1974

No. 56
- Position: Linebacker

Personal information
- Born: March 18, 1951; Texarkana, Arkansas, U.S.
- Died: July 22, 2007 (aged 56); Lake Jackson, Texas, U.S.
- Listed height: 6 ft 2 in (1.88 m)
- Listed weight: 220 lb (100 kg)

Career information
- High school: Brazosport (Freeport, Texas)
- College: Arkansas
- NFL draft: 1974: 6th round, 140th overall pick

Career history
- Baltimore Colts (1974); Saskatchewan Roughriders (1975)

Awards and highlights
- 2× First-team All-SWC (1971, 1973)
- Stats at Pro Football Reference

Danny Boyiet Rhodes (March 18, 1951 – July 22, 2007) was an American professional football linebacker who played for the Baltimore Colts of the National Football League (NFL). He played college football for the Arkansas Razorbacks and was selected by the Colts in the sixth round of the 1974 NFL draft.

== Early life ==
Danny Boyiet Rhodes was born on March 18, 1951, in Texarkana, Arkansas. He attended Brazosport High School in Freeport, Texas.

== College career ==
Rhodes enrolled at the University of Arkansas to play college football for the Razorbacks. He played for the freshman team in 1970, earning first-team freshman All-Southwest Conference (SWC) honors at linebacker. He was a three-year varsity letterman from 1971 to 1973. In 1971, Rhodes garnered Associated Press (AP) first-team All-SWC and SWC Sophomore Defensive Player of the Year recognition. He was named first-team All-SWC by both the AP and United Press International as a senior in 1973.

== Professional career ==
Rhodes was selected by the Baltimore Colts in the sixth round, with the 140th overall pick, of the 1974 NFL draft. He signed with the team on February 8. He played in all 14 games for the Colts during the 1974 season as a reserve linebacker. Rhodes was released on September 3, 1975, after the fourth of six preseason games.

Rhodes signed with the Saskatchewan Roughriders of the Canadian Football League on September 19, 1975, and was immediately named the team's starting middle linebacker. However, he only ended up playing in two games that year due to injury. He left the Roughriders during training camp in June 1976.

== Personal life ==
Rhodes had been riding motorcycles since he was 11. He died on July 22, 2007, in Lake Jackson, Texas, in a motorcycle-car collision. He owned 20 motorcycles during his lifetime. Rhodes lived in Point Comfort, Texas, and worked at Formosa Plastics as a chemical process operator from 1999 until his death in 2007.
