= Will Renfro =

American football player (1932–2010)

No. 71, 73, 66
- Positions: Offensive tackle, defensive lineman

Personal information
- Born: March 15, 1932; Batesville, Mississippi, U.S.
- Died: September 18, 2010 (aged 78); Pensacola, Florida, U.S.
- Listed height: 6 ft 5 in (1.96 m)
- Listed weight: 233 lb (106 kg)

Career information
- College: Memphis
- NFL draft: 1954: 24th round, 284th overall pick

Career history
- Washington Redskins (1957–1959); Pittsburgh Steelers (1960); Philadelphia Eagles (1961)

Career NFL statistics
- Games played: 60
- Games started: 33
- Fumble recoveries: 2
- Stats at Pro Football Reference

Will Ellis Renfro (March 15, 1932 – September 18, 2010) was an American professional football offensive tackle in the National Football League (NFL) for the Washington Redskins, the Pittsburgh Steelers, and the Philadelphia Eagles. He played college football at the University of Memphis and was drafted 284th overall in the 24th round of the 1954 NFL draft.
