= Tom Roussel =

American football player (born 1945)

No. 54, 53
- Position: Linebacker

Personal information
- Born: January 20, 1945 (age 81); Thibodaux, Louisiana, U.S.
- Listed height: 6 ft 3 in (1.91 m)
- Listed weight: 235 lb (107 kg)

Career information
- High school: Thibodaux
- College: Southern Miss (1964-1967)
- NFL draft: 1968: 2nd round, 38th overall pick

Career history
- Washington Redskins (1968–1970); New Orleans Saints (1971–1972); Philadelphia Eagles (1973); Memphis Southmen (1974); Chicago Fire (1974); Chicago Winds (1975)

Career NFL statistics
- Fumble recoveries: 2
- Interceptions: 2
- Sacks: 3.5
- Stats at Pro Football Reference

Thomas James Roussel (born January 20, 1945) is an American former professional football player who was a linebacker in the National Football League (NFL) for the Washington Redskins, New Orleans Saints, and Philadelphia Eagles. He played college football for the Southern Miss Golden Eagles and was selected 38th overall in the second round of the 1968 NFL/AFL draft.
