= Dedrick Roper =

American football player (born 1981)

No. 59, 53
- Position: Linebacker

Personal information
- Born: July 31, 1981 (age 45); Detroit, Michigan, U.S.
- Listed height: 6 ft 2 in (1.88 m)
- Listed weight: 245 lb (111 kg)

Career information
- College: Northwood

Career history
- Pittsburgh Steelers (2004)*; St. Louis Rams (2004)*; Pittsburgh Steelers (2004-2005)*; Philadelphia Eagles (2005–2006)
- * Offseason or practice squad member only

Career statistics
- Total tackles: 12
- Forced fumbles: 1
- Stats at Pro Football Reference

Dedrick Roper (born July 31, 1981) is an American former professional football player who was a linebacker in the National Football League (NFL). He played college football for the Northwood Timberwolves.

Roper was born in Detroit, Michigan and raised in Milpitas, California. He began his NFL career with the Pittsburgh Steelers, and played for the St. Louis Rams for all of one week before the Eagles signed him in 2005 season. He was cut by the Eagles prior to the 2006 season and spent time on the practice squad. He was re-signed later in the season due to injuries to the defense.
