= Dan Rogas =

American football player (1926–2018)

No. 64, 65
- Positions: Guard, tackle, defensive tackle

Personal information
- Born: August 9, 1926; Port Arthur, Texas, U.S.
- Died: May 1, 2018 (aged 91); Beaumont, Texas, U.S.
- Listed height: 6 ft 1 in (1.85 m)
- Listed weight: 230 lb (104 kg)

Career information
- High school: Thomas Jefferson (Port Arthur)
- College: Tulane
- NFL draft: 1951: 6th round, 74th overall pick

Career history
- Detroit Lions (1951); Philadelphia Eagles (1952)

Career NFL statistics
- Games played: 22
- Games started: 7
- Fumble recoveries: 1
- Stats at Pro Football Reference

Dan William Rogas Sr. (August 9, 1926 – May 1, 2018) was an American professional football player who was an offensive lineman for two seasons for the Detroit Lions and Philadelphia Eagles.
