= Jim Russell (American football) =

No. 22, 29, 9, 25, 27
- Position: Guard

Personal information
- Born: August 18, 1908; Sinnemahoning, Pennsylvania, U.S.
- Died: January 21, 1990 (aged 81); Evans City, Pennsylvania, U.S.
- Listed height: 5 ft 11 in (1.80 m)
- Listed weight: 210 lb (95 kg)

Career information
- High school: Williamsport (Williamsport, Pennsylvania)
- College: Temple (1932–1935)
- NFL draft: 1936: undrafted

Career history
- Philadelphia Eagles (1936–1937); Wilmington Clippers (1937–1938)

James Lowell Russell (August 18, 1908 – January 21, 1990) was an American professional football guard. He played college football for the Temple Owls and served as captain. After college, Russell played two seasons in the National Football League (NFL) for the Philadelphia Eagles along with two seasons for the independent Wilmington Clippers.
