= Dave Recher =

American football player (born 1942)

No. 51, 50
- Position: Center

Personal information
- Born: December 30, 1942 (age 83); Chicago, Illinois
- Listed height: 6 ft 1 in (1.85 m)
- Listed weight: 245 lb (111 kg)

Career information
- High school: Skokie (IL) Niles Township
- College: Iowa

Career history
- Philadelphia Eagles (1965–1968)
- Stats at Pro Football Reference

Dave Recher (born December 30, 1942) is an American former football center. He played for the Philadelphia Eagles from 1965 to 1968.
