= Ev Rowan =

American football player (1902–1956)

Profile
- Position: End

Personal information
- Born: October 18, 1902; Chillicothe, Ohio, U.S.
- Died: November 9, 1956 (aged 54); La Mesa, California, U.S.
- Listed height: 6 ft 1 in (1.85 m)
- Listed weight: 187 lb (85 kg)

Career information
- High school: Chillicothe (Ohio)
- College: Ohio State (1924–1927)

Career history
- Brooklyn Dodgers (1930, 1932); Philadelphia Eagles (1933); Louisville Bourbons (1934)
- Stats at Pro Football Reference

Everett Lawrence Rowan (October 18, 1902 – November 9, 1956) was an American professional football end who played three seasons in the National Football League (NFL) with the Brooklyn Dodgers and Philadelphia Eagles. He played college football at Ohio State University.

== Early life and college ==
Everett Lawrence Rowan was born on October 18, 1902, in Chillicothe, Ohio. He attended Chillicothe High School.

Rowan played college football for the Ohio State Buckeyes of Ohio State University. He was on the freshman team in 1924 and was a three-year letterman from 1925 to 1927.

== Professional career ==
Rowan played in two games for the Brooklyn Dodgers of the National Football League (NFL) in 1930 and appeared in eleven games, starting nine, for the team during the 1932 season.

He played in two games, starting one, for the NFL's Philadelphia Eagles in 1933.

Rowan appeared in eight games, starting five, for the Louisville Bourbons of the American Football League in 1934.

== Personal life ==
Rowan served in the United States Navy. He died of a heart attack at his home in La Mesa, California on November 9, 1956.
