= Mike Reed (fullback) =

American football player (1975–2014)

No. 39
- Position: Fullback

Personal information
- Born: January 6, 1975; Washington, D.C., U.S.
- Died: January 31, 2014 (aged 39); Bakersfield, California, U.S.
- Listed height: 6 ft 0 in (1.83 m)
- Listed weight: 215 lb (98 kg)

Career information
- High school: Clover Park (Lakewood, Washington)
- College: Washington (1994–1997)

Career history
- Philadelphia Eagles (1998–1999)
- Stats at Pro Football Reference

Michael G. Reed (January 6, 1975 – January 31, 2014) was an American professional football fullback who played one season with the Philadelphia Eagles of the National Football League (NFL). He played college football at the University of Washington.

== Early life and college ==
Michael G. Reed was born on January 6, 1975, in Washington, D.C. He first attended Woodbridge American High School in Woodbridge, England before moving back to the United States and attending Clover Park High School in Lakewood, Washington.

Reed played college football for the Washington Huskies from 1994 to 1997 as a fullback. He rushed 10 times for 21 yards his freshman year in 1994. He totalled seven carries for 40 yards and two receptions for 17 yards in 1995. He recorded 42 rushing attempts for 106 yards and one touchdown and three catches for 36 yards in 1996. Reed rushed five times for 21 yards and caught five passes for 84 yards and three touchdowns his senior year in 1997.

== Professional career ==
After going undrafted in the 1998 NFL draft, Reed signed with the Philadelphia Eagles on April 21, 1998. He was waived on August 30 and signed to the team's practice squad on September 1. He was promoted to the active roster on October 5 and played in two games without recording any statistics before being released on November 27 and signed back to the practice squad on December 1. Reed was moved back to the active roster on December 10 and played in two more games for the Eagles that season, once again without recording any statistics.

Reed was released by the Eagles the next year on September 5, 1999, and signed to the practice squad on September 8. He was released for the final time on September 22, 1999.

== Death ==
Reed died of cancer on January 31, 2014, in Bakersfield, California.
