= William Roffler =

American football player (1930–2015)

Bill Roffler
No. 23
- Position: Defensive back

Personal information
- Born: September 16, 1930; Spokane, Washington, U.S.
- Died: January 20, 2015 (aged 84); Spokane, Washington, U.S.
- Listed height: 6 ft 1 in (1.85 m)
- Listed weight: 200 lb (91 kg)

Career information
- High school: Lewis and Clark (Spokane)
- College: Washington State (1948–1951)
- NFL draft: 1952: 10th round, 116th overall pick

Career history
- Philadelphia Eagles (1954)

Career NFL statistics
- Return yards: 19
- Stats at Pro Football Reference

William Hartman "Bud" Roffler (September 16, 1930 – January 20, 2015), also known as Bill Roffler, was an American professional football defensive back. He attended Lewis and Clark High School in Spokane, Washington, before playing college football, baseball and basketball for the Washington State Cougars. He died in Spokane on January 20, 2015, of pneumonia.
