= Ryan Rau =

American gridiron football player (born 1990)

No. 53
- Position: Linebacker

Personal information
- Born: July 30, 1990 (age 36); Folsom, California, U.S.
- Listed height: 6 ft 1 in (1.85 m)
- Listed weight: 230 lb (104 kg)

Career information
- High school: Folsom
- College: Portland State (2008–2011)
- NFL draft: 2012: undrafted

Career history
- Philadelphia Eagles (2012); Cleveland Browns (2013)*; Carolina Panthers (2013)*; Edmonton Eskimos (2014)*; Miami Dolphins (2014)*
- * Offseason or practice squad member only

Career NFL statistics
- Total tackles: 3
- Stats at Pro Football Reference

Ryan Rau (born July 30, 1990) is an American former professional football player who was a linebacker in the National Football League (NFL). After playing college football for the Portland State Vikings, he was signed by the Philadelphia Eagles as an undrafted free agent in 2012.

== Professional career ==
=== Philadelphia Eagles ===
Rau was signed by the Philadelphia Eagles as an undrafted free agent following the 2012 NFL draft on June 14, 2012. After playing the entire preseason with the team, he was released during final roster cuts on August 31. He was re-signed to the team's practice squad on September 1, and was promoted to the active roster on December 8. Rau made his NFL debut on December 9 against the Tampa Bay Buccaneers. Rau was released from his contract on April 11, 2013.

=== Cleveland Browns ===
Rau was claimed off waivers by the Cleveland Browns on April 12, 2013. He was released on May 21, 2013.

=== Carolina Panthers ===
Rau was signed by the Carolina Panthers on May 22, 2013. On August 24, 2013, he was waived by the Panthers.
