= Don Ratliff =

American gridiron football player (born 1950)

No. 85, 83, 86, 77
- Positions: Wide receiver, defensive end

Personal information
- Born: July 17, 1950 (age 76); Baltimore, Maryland, U.S.
- Listed height: 6 ft 5 in (1.96 m)
- Listed weight: 250 lb (113 kg)

Career information
- High school: John Handley (Winchester, Virginia)
- College: Maryland
- NFL draft: 1973: undrafted

Career history
- Florida Blazers (1974); Detroit Wheels (1974); Philadelphia Bell (1974–1975); Philadelphia Eagles (1975); BC Lions (1976–1977)

Career NFL statistics
- Games played: 6
- Games started: 2
- Stats at Pro Football Reference

Career CFL statistics
- Games played: 1

Donald Eugene Ratliff (born July 17, 1950) is an American former gridiron football wide receiver and defensive end who played four seasons, for the Florida Blazers, Detroit Wheels, and Philadelphia Bell of the World Football League (WFL), the Philadelphia Eagles of the National Football League (NFL), and the BC Lions of the Canadian Football League (CFL). He later was a businessman.

== Early life and education ==
Ratliff was born on July 17, 1950, in Baltimore, Maryland. He went to John Handley High School in Winchester, Virginia before attending the University of Maryland, College Park. At Maryland, he played wide receiver for their football team, the Maryland Terrapins. His statistics were recorded for the 1970 and 1972 seasons. In 1970, Ratliff played in 11 games while making 26 catches for 242 yards, a 9.3 yard average. He finished ninth in the Atlantic Coast Conference (ACC) for receptions. In Ratliff's senior year, 1972, he had 36 receptions for 515 yards, including 6 touchdowns. He ranked among the ACC's leaders in 1972: fourth in receptions, fourth in receiving yards, sixth in yards per reception (14.3), second in receiving touchdowns, fifth in touchdowns, and fifth in points. He graduated after the season.

== Professional career ==
=== 1974 ===
Ratliff's first season of professional football came in 1974 in the World Football League (WFL). He played for three different teams during the season, they were the: Florida Blazers, Detroit Wheels, and Philadelphia Bell. With the Blazers, he played in 7 games, starting 3, and wore number 85. With the Wheels, he played in 7 games, and wore number 83. And with the Bell he played in 3 games, wearing number 86.

=== 1975 ===
Ratliff played for two teams the next year, the Philadelphia Bell of the World Football League (WFL) and the Philadelphia Eagles of the National Football League (NFL). He played in 11 games for the Bell before the season was canceled. After the season was canceled he went to the Philadelphia Eagles of the NFL and played in 6 games with them. He also started 2 games. His number with the Eagles was 77.

=== 1976–1977 ===
The next two years Ratliff spent with the BC Lions of the Canadian Football League (CFL), but only made one appearance. It was his last season of professional football.

== Later life ==
After his professional career, Ratliff was a businessman. He was president of Stackig Advertising in Washington DC and spent eleven years with Earle Palmer Brown Advertising. He also served on the Washington Ad Club Board of Directors where he was awarded the Crystal Prism Award. In 1991, he moved to Orlando, Florida to become president of Gouchenour Advertising. In 1994, Ratliff founded Synergy Sports Marketing, a program in Florida. In 1996, he was elected as the president of the Orlando Advertising Federation.
