= Ray Romero =

American football player (1927–2023)

No. 68
- Position: Guard

Personal information
- Born: December 31, 1927; Wichita, Kansas, U.S.
- Died: November 25, 2023 (aged 95); Miami Beach, Florida, U.S.
- Listed height: 5 ft 11 in (1.80 m)
- Listed weight: 213 lb (97 kg)

Career information
- High school: Wichita (KS) North
- College: Kansas State

Career history
- Philadelphia Eagles (1951)

Career statistics
- Games played: 7
- Stats at Pro Football Reference

Ray Rene Romero (December 31, 1927 – November 25, 2023) was an American football guard who played for the Philadelphia Eagles. He played college football at Kansas State University, having previously attended Wichita North High School in Wichita. He was of Mexican American descent. Romero died in Miami Beach, Florida on November 25, 2023, at the age of 95.
