= Marion Reeves =

American football player (born 1952)

No. 45
- Position: Defensive back

Personal information
- Born: February 23, 1952 (age 74); Lexington, South Carolina, U.S.
- Listed height: 6 ft 1 in (1.85 m)
- Listed weight: 195 lb (88 kg)

Career information
- High school: Irmo
- College: Clemson
- NFL draft: 1974: undrafted

Career history
- Philadelphia Eagles (1974); Philadelphia Bell (1975); Winnipeg Blue Bombers (1975–1976)
- Stats at Pro Football Reference

Marion Francis Reeves (born February 23, 1952) is an American former professional football player who was a defensive back for the Philadelphia Eagles of National Football League (NFL). He played college football for the Clemson University.
