= Kevin Reilly (American football) =

American football player (born 1951)

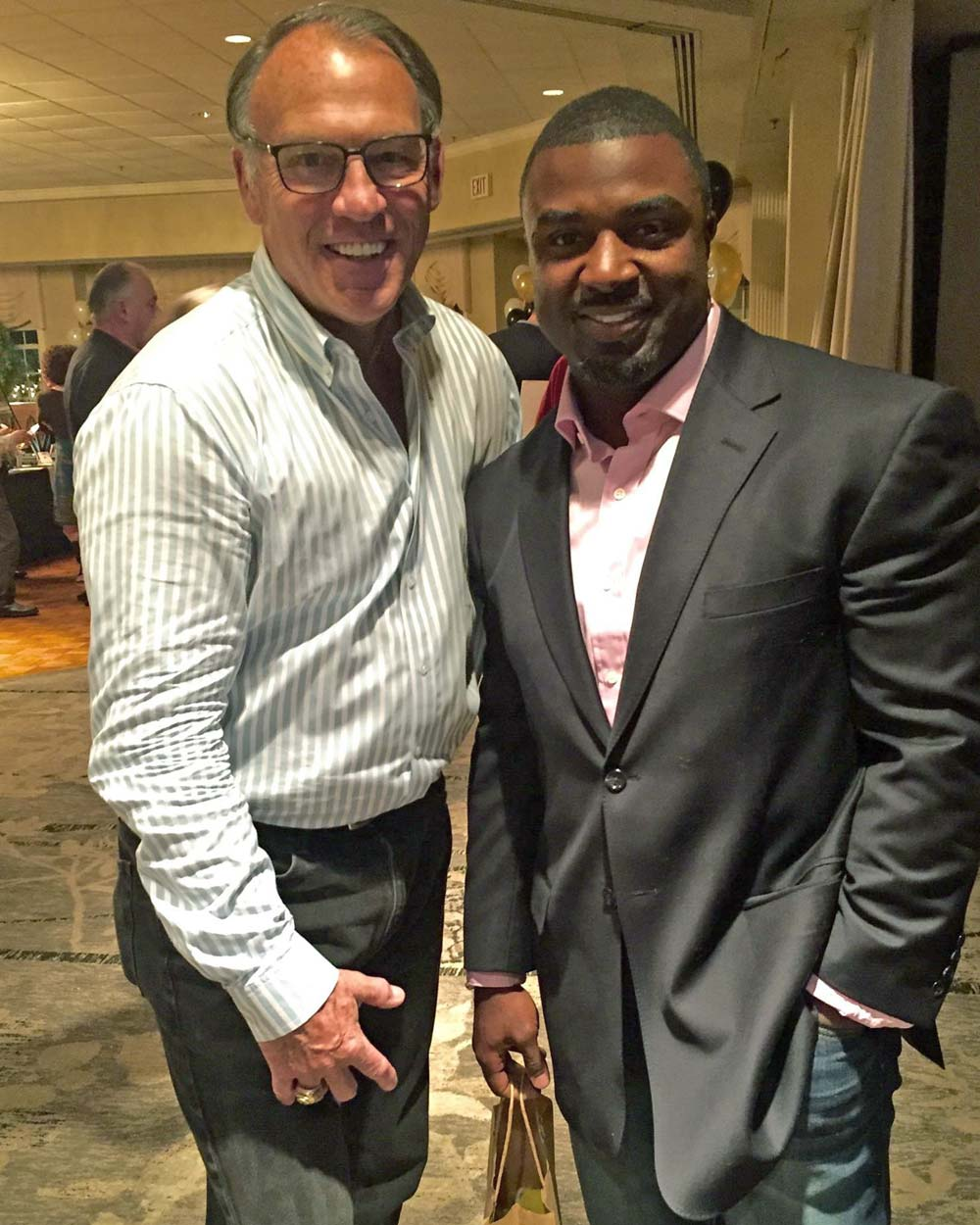
- Reilly (left) and Brian Westbrook

No. 52, 55
- Position: Linebacker

Personal information
- Born: April 10, 1951 (age 75); Wilmington, Delaware, U.S.
- Listed height: 6 ft 2 in (1.88 m)
- Listed weight: 220 lb (100 kg)

Career information
- High school: Salesianum School (Wilmington, Delaware)
- College: Villanova
- NFL draft: 1973: 7th round, 160th overall pick

Career history
- Philadelphia Eagles (1973–1974); New England Patriots (1975)

Awards and highlights
- First-team All-East (1972)
- Stats at Pro Football Reference

Kevin Reilly (born April 10, 1951) is an American former professional football player with the Philadelphia Eagles, author, motivational speaker, amputee and former broadcaster for the Philadelphia Eagles Network.

== NFL career ==
Reilly was originally drafted 160th overall from Villanova by the Miami Dolphins in 1973 in the seventh round, although later that year he returned to his Wilmington, Delaware home and joined the Philadelphia Eagles, serving as captain of the squad's special teams for two seasons before ending his career with the New England Patriots.

== Cancer ==
In 1976, shortly after beginning his NFL career, Reilly was diagnosed with a rare scar tissue tumor known as desmoid tumor. This effectively ended his career in football. He then underwent multiple surgeries that were unsuccessful in curing the tumor, ultimately undergoing an 11 1/2 hour surgery in 1979 at Memorial Sloan Kettering to remove his left arm, shoulder, and five ribs. Recovery from surgery as an amputee was difficult and Reilly suffered significant depression but was able to overcome it at least in part due to the support of another NFL player who overcame similar physical trauma from injury in the Vietnam War, Rocky Bleier.

== Post cancer life ==
After surgery, Reilly worked hard at rehabilitation to overcome the limitations the experts said he would have. He learned to tie a necktie with one hand, to play golf with one hand, and ran five half marathons and in the Marine Corps Marathon.

He went on to a 30-year career with Xerox and, having retired from corporate America, is a sports radio broadcaster, appearing on Eagles' pregame and postgame shows. He is also a motivational speaker, sharing his story with corporate audiences, business leaders, cancer patients, recuperating soldiers, and special needs students. Reilly also counseled victims of the Boston Marathon Bombings.

In 1985, he was inducted into the Delaware Sports Hall of Fame.

In 2015, Reilly was announced as the color analyst for the Villanova Wildcats football radio team on WTEL (AM).

In 2018, Kevin Reilly, along with John Riley, wrote the book Tackling Life: How Faith, Family and Fortitude Kept an NFL Linebacker in the Game.
