= 2006 San Francisco 49ers season =

American football team season

- Owner: Denise DeBartolo York and John York
- General manager: Mike Nolan
- President: John York
- Head coach: Mike Nolan
- Offensive coordinator: Norv Turner
- Defensive coordinator: Bill Davis
- Home stadium: Monster Park

Results
- Record: 7–9
- Division place: 3rd NFC West
- Playoffs: Did not qualify
- All-Pros: Frank Gore (2nd team)
- Pro Bowlers: RB Frank Gore; G Larry Allen; CB Walt Harris

Uniform
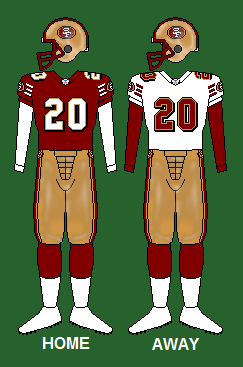

The 2006 San Francisco 49ers season was the franchise's 57th season in the National Football League (NFL) and their 61st overall. It began with the team trying to improve on their 4–12 record in 2005. Despite having improved from their previous two disastrous seasons, they missed the playoffs for the fourth straight year, continuing their playoff drought. The 49ers celebrated their 60th anniversary during the 2006 season, because, although it was their 61st season, the 2006 calendar year marked the 60th anniversary of the franchise's founding in 1946.

== Offseason ==
Soon after the end of the 2005 season, Mike McCarthy, the 49ers' offensive coordinator of one year, left for the Green Bay Packers. On January 17, 2006, the 49ers hired Norv Turner as McCarthy's replacement. Whereas McCarthy based the majority of his offense on Bill Walsh's West Coast Offense, Turner has been known to use a power running scheme and vertical passing game more often than the West Coast scheme. Turner came to the 49ers after two unsuccessful seasons as the head coach of the 49ers' cross-bay rivals, the Oakland Raiders.

The 49ers gained the sixth pick in the 2006 NFL draft after winning a coin toss with the Raiders at the scouting combine in Indianapolis. The 49ers used their first pick on Maryland Tight End Vernon Davis. They then used their next pick (acquired from the Denver Broncos via the Washington Redskins) on North Carolina State defensive end Manny Lawson. The rest of their picks were Wisconsin Wide Receiver Brandon Williams, Penn State RB Michael Robinson, Tennessee DE Parys Haralson, Central Missouri St. Wide Receiver Delanie Walker, North Carolina St. Safety Marcus Hudson, Louisiana St. DE Melvin Oliver, and Arkansas Safety Vickiel Vaughn.

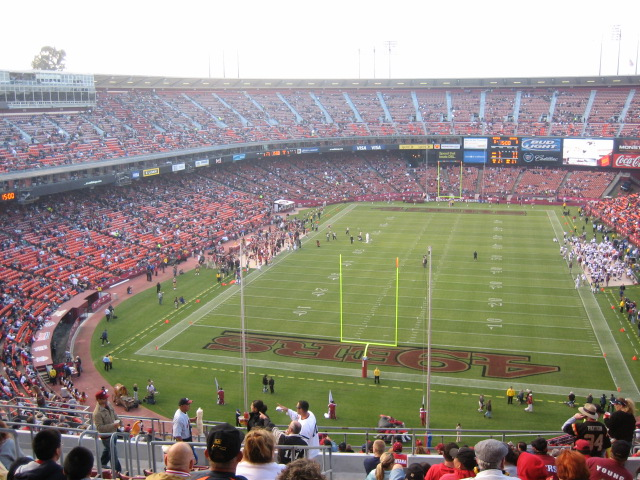
Candlestick Park on August 11, 2006

The 49ers had two major free agent acquisitions in the offseason. Larry Allen, a perennial Pro Bowl left guard from the Dallas Cowboys, and Antonio Bryant, a talented but oft-troubled wide receiver from the Cleveland Browns. The 49ers also traded Kevan Barlow to the New York Jets for what was believed to be a 2007 4th round draft pick.

=== Draft ===
2006 San Francisco 49ers draft
Round	Pick	Player	Position	College	Notes
1	6	Vernon Davis *	TE	Maryland	
1	22	Manny Lawson	LB	NC State	from Washington via Denver
3	84	Brandon Williams	WR	Wisconsin	from Washington
4	100	Michael Robinson *	RB	Penn State	
5	140	Parys Haralson	DE	Tennessee	
6	175	Delanie Walker *	TE	Central Missouri State	
6	192	Marcus Hudson	S	NC State	from Tampa Bay
6	197	Melvin Oliver	DE	LSU	
7	254	Vickiel Vaughn	S	Arkansas	
Made roster † Pro Football Hall of Fame * Made at least one Pro Bowl during career

== Staff ==
2006 San Francisco 49ers staff
Front office {{{front_office}}} Head coaches: Head coach – Mike Nolan; Assistant head coach-defense/linebackers – Mike Singletary; Special assistant to the head coach – Robert Talley; Offensive coaches: Offensive coordinator – Norv Turner; Quarterbacks – Jim Hostler; Running backs – Bishop Harris; Senior assistant/wide receivers – Jerry Sullivan; Tight ends – Pete Hoener; Offensive line – George Warhop; Offensive assistant/quarterbacks – Pep Hamilton	Defensive coaches: Defensive coordinator – Bill Davis; Defensive line – Gary Emanuel; Defensive backs/secondary – Johnnie Lynn; Defensive backs – Vance Joseph; Defensive assistant/outside linebackers – Jason Tarver; Special teams coaches: Special teams coordinator – Larry Mac Duff; Assistant special teams – Jeff Rodgers; Strength and conditioning: Strength and conditioning – strength coach Johnny Parker; Assistant strength and conditioning – Duane Carlisle; Head athletic trainer – Jeff Ferguson

== Roster ==
2006 San Francisco 49ers roster
Quarterbacks (QB): 12 Trent Dilfer; 13 Shaun Hill; 11 Alex Smith; Running backs (RB): 21 Frank Gore; 43 Maurice Hicks; 40 Moran Norris FB; 44 Chris Hetherington FB; 24 Michael Robinson; Wide receivers (WR): 83 Arnaz Battle; 88 Taylor Jacobs; 84 Bryan Gilmore; 17 Brandon Williams; Tight ends (TE): 47 Billy Bajema; 85 Vernon Davis; 82 Eric Johnson; 46 Delanie Walker	Offensive linemen (OL): 71 Larry Allen G; 64 David Baas G; 76 Harvey Dahl G; 78 Patrick Estes T; 77 Kwame Harris T; 75 Jonas Jennings T; 68 Adam Snyder G/T; 65 Justin Smiley G; 74 Nick Steitz G; 69 Tony Wragge C/G; Defensive linemen (DL): 91 Anthony Adams DT; 95 Damane Duckett DE; 94 Marques Douglas DT; 92 Lance Legree DT; 96 Melvin Oliver DE; 90 Isaac Sopoaga DT; 97 Bryant Young DE	Linebackers (LB): 54 Roderick Green OLB; 99 Manny Lawson OLB; 56 Brandon Moore OLB; 55 Hannibal Navies OLB; 50 Derek Smith MLB; 53 Jeff Ulbrich MLB; 59 Renauld Williams OLB; Defensive backs (DB): 20 Mike Adams FS; 35 Deke Cooper FS; 27 Walt Harris CB; 23 Marcus Hudson CB; 28 Keith Lewis FS; 26 Mark Roman SS; 36 Shawntae Spencer CB; 22 B. J. Tucker CB; 25 Chad Williams SS; Special teams (ST): 86 Brian Jennings LS; 4 Andy Lee P; 6 Joe Nedney K	Practice squad: 14 C. J. Brewer WR; 45 Zak Keasey FB; 19 Marcus Maxwell WR; 57 Jared Newberry LB; 58 Russell Rabe LB; 29 Harrison Smith CB; 67 Tavares Washington T; 33 Jerron Wishom CB; Reserve: 81 Antonio Bryant WR (Susp.); 31 Sammy Davis CB (IR); 93 Ronald Fields DT (IR); 51 Jay Foreman LB (IR); 98 Parys Haralson LB (IR); 66 Eric Heitmann C (IR); 62 Jeremy Newberry C (IR); 52 T. J. Slaughter LB (IR); 30 Donald Strickland CB (IR); -- Andre Torrey LB (IR); 32 Vickiel Vaughn S (IR); Rookies in italics 52 active, 11 reserve, 8 practice squad

== Preseason ==
Week	Date	Opponent	Result	Record	Venue	Recap
1	August 11	Chicago Bears	W 28–14	1–0	Monster Park	Recap
2	August 20	at Oakland Raiders	L 7–23	1–1	McAfee Coliseum	Recap
3	August 26	at Dallas Cowboys	L 7–17	1–2	Texas Stadium	Recap
4	September 1	San Diego Chargers	W 23–14	2–2	Monster Park	Recap

== Regular season ==
=== Schedule ===
Week	Date	Opponent	Result	Record	Venue	Recap
1	September 10	at **Arizona Cardinals**	**L** 27–34	0–1	University of Phoenix Stadium	Recap
2	September 17	**St. Louis Rams**	**W** 20–13	1–1	Monster Park	Recap
3	September 24	Philadelphia Eagles	**L** 24–38	1–2	Monster Park	Recap
4	October 1	at Kansas City Chiefs	**L** 0–41	1–3	Arrowhead Stadium	Recap
5	October 8	Oakland Raiders	**W** 34–20	2–3	Monster Park	Recap
6	October 15	San Diego Chargers	**L** 19–48	2–4	Monster Park	Recap
7	Bye					
8	October 29	at Chicago Bears	**L** 10–41	2–5	Soldier Field	Recap
9	November 5	Minnesota Vikings	**W** 9–3	3–5	Monster Park	Recap
10	November 12	at Detroit Lions	**W** 19–13	4–5	Ford Field	Recap
11	November 19	**Seattle Seahawks**	**W** 20–14	5–5	Monster Park	Recap
12	November 26	at **St. Louis Rams**	**L** 17–20	5–6	Edward Jones Dome	Recap
13	December 3	at New Orleans Saints	**L** 10–34	5–7	Louisiana Superdome	Recap
14	December 10	Green Bay Packers	**L** 19–30	5–8	Monster Park	Recap
15	December 14	at **Seattle Seahawks**	**W** 24–14	6–8	Qwest Field	Recap
16	December 24	**Arizona Cardinals**	**L** 20–26	6–9	Monster Park	Recap
17	December 31	at Denver Broncos	**W** 26–23 (OT)	7–9	Invesco Field at Mile High	Recap
Note: Intra-division opponents are in **bold** text.

=== Game summaries ===
==== Week 1: at Arizona Cardinals ====
Week 1: San Francisco 49ers at Arizona Cardinals

Quarter	1	2	3	4	Total
49ers	7	7	7	6	**27**
**Cardinals**	21	3	7	3	**34**

at University of Phoenix Stadium, Glendale, Arizona

- Date: Sunday, September 10, 2006
- Game time: 1:15PM PST
- TV announcers (Fox): Josh Lewin & Bill Maas

Game information
**First quarter**
- SF – Vernon Davis 31-yard pass from Alex Smith (Joe Nedney kick)
- AZ – Troy Walters 2-yard pass from Kurt Warner (Neil Rackers kick)
- AZ – Edgerrin James 1-yard rush (Neil Rackers kick)
- AZ – Anquan Boldin 6-yard pass from Kurt Warner (Neil Rackers kick)

**Second quarter**

- SF – Frank Gore 4-yard rush (Joe Nedney kick)
- AZ – Neil Rackers 36-yard field goal

**Third quarter**

- SF – Frank Gore 2-yard rush (Joe Nedney kick)
- AZ – Adam Bergen 7-yard pass from Kurt Warner (Neil Rackers kick)

**Fourth quarter**

- SF – Joe Nedney 22–yard field goal
- AZ – Neil Rackers 30–yard field goal
- SF – Joe Nedney 44–yard field goal

The 49ers opened the regular season against the Arizona Cardinals on September 10. Despite losing 34–27, many positives can be taken out of the game. RB Frank Gore rushed for 88 yards and caught 6 receptions for over 80 yards with two touchdowns. Rookie tight end Vernon Davis and second year quarterback Alex Smith hooked up for a touchdown pass with Smith equaling his touchdown total of the entire 2005 season and passing for an encouraging 288 yards with 23 completions out of 40 attempts. The 49ers had several chances to win it, however, many controversial non-calls were made by the officials, including a blatant pass interference in the end zone, which would have tied the game with just a little over 2 minutes to go. The 49ers would thus start their 61st season 0–1.

==== Week 2: vs. St. Louis Rams ====
Week 2: St. Louis Rams at San Francisco 49ers

Quarter	1	2	3	4	Total
Rams	0	10	0	3	**13**
**49ers**	3	0	14	3	**20**

at Monster Park, San Francisco, California

- Date: Sunday, September 17, 2006
- Game time: 1:05PM PST
- Game weather: 81 °F or 27.2 °C (Sunny)
- TV announcers (Fox): Matt Vasgersian & J.C. Pearson

Game information
**First quarter**
- SF – Joe Nedney 32-yard field goal

**Second quarter**

- STL – Jeff Wilkins 49-yard field goal
- STL – Torry Holt 3-yard pass from Marc Bulger (Jeff Wilkins kick)

**Third quarter**

- SF – Frank Gore 32-yard rush (Joe Nedney kick)
- SF – Antonio Bryant 72-yard pass from Alex Smith (Joe Nedney kick)

**Fourth quarter**

- STL – Jeff Wilkins 40-yard field goal
- SF – Joe Nedney 20-yard field goal

The 49ers played their second game of the season against the St. Louis Rams on September 17 in a Week 2 home – opener. After a loss to the Arizona Cardinals the previous week, the 49ers redeemed themselves with a win at home. Second year quarterback Alex Smith threw for 233 yards with 11 completions and one touchdown pass to Antonio Bryant. Bryant had four receptions with 131 yards. Running back Frank Gore ran for a (at the time) career-best 127 yards with a touchdown, despite Jonas Jennings and Larry Allen being sidelined with injuries. San Francisco won 20–13 and evened out their record at 1–1.

==== Week 3: vs. Philadelphia Eagles ====
Week 3: Philadelphia Eagles at San Francisco 49ers

Quarter	1	2	3	4	Total
**Eagles**	14	10	7	7	**38**
49ers	0	3	7	14	**24**

at Monster Park, San Francisco, California

- Date: Sunday, September 24, 2006
- Game time: 1:15PM PST
- Game weather: 75 °F or 23.9 °C (Sunny)
- TV announcers (Fox): Kenny Albert & Brian Baldinger

Game information
**First quarter**
- PHI – Brian Westbrook 4-yard pass from Donovan McNabb (David Akers kick)
- PHI – L.J. Smith 1-yard pass from Donovan McNabb (David Akers kick)

**Second quarter**

- SF – Joe Nedney 48-yard field goal
- PHI – Brian Westbrook 71-yard rush (David Akers kick)
- PHI – David Akers 21-yard field goal

**Third quarter**

- PHI – Mike Patterson 98-yard fumble return (David Akers kick)
- SF – Michael Robinson 1-yard rush (Joe Nedney kick)

**Fourth quarter**

- SF – Michael Robinson 1-yard rush (Joe Nedney kick)
- PHI – Brian Westbrook 8-yard rush (David Akers kick)
- SF – Eric Johnson 15-yard pass from Alex Smith (Joe Nedney kick)

The 49ers stayed at home for a Week 3 contest against the Philadelphia Eagles. From the get-go, the Niners trailed as QB Donovan McNabb managed to complete two TD passes to RB Brian Westbrook (a 4-yard pass) and WR L.J. Smith (a 1-yard pass) in the first quarter. In the second quarter, San Francisco would get on the board with Kicker Joe Nedney completing a 48-yard field goal, but Philadelphia would strike hard, as RB Brian Westbrook ran 71 yards for a touchdown and Kicker David Akers completed a 21-yard field goal. In the third quarter, both sides managed to get themselves a touchdown. Eagles DT Mike Patterson returned a 49ers fumble 98 yards for a touchdown, while the Niners' rookie RB Michael Robinson got a 1-yard TD run. In the fourth quarter, San Francisco tried to come back with Robinson getting another 1-yard TD run. However, the Eagles got an 8-yard TD run by Westbrook. The Niners would get one more score, as QB Alex Smith completed a TE Eric Johnson, but that would as far as they would get, as the 49ers fell to 1–2 on the year.

==== Week 4: at Kansas City Chiefs ====
Week 4: San Francisco 49ers at Kansas City Chiefs

Quarter	1	2	3	4	Total
49ers	0	0	0	0	**0**
**Chiefs**	10	14	3	14	**41**

at Arrowhead Stadium, Kansas City, Missouri

- Date: Sunday, October 1, 2006

Game information
**First quarter**
- KC – Dante Hall 13-yard pass from Damon Huard (Lawrence Tynes kick)
- KC – Lawrence Tynes 22-yard field goal

**Second quarter**

- KC – Larry Johnson 1-yard rush (Lawrence Tynes kick)
- KC – Eddie Kennison 34-yard pass from Damon Huard (Lawrence Tynes kick)

**Third quarter**

- KC – Lawrence Tynes 49-yard field goal

**Fourth quarter**

- KC – Larry Johnson 2-yard rush (Lawrence Tynes kick)
- KC – Dante Hall 60-yard punt return (Lawrence Tynes kick)

After losing at home to the Eagles, the 49ers flew to Arrowhead Stadium for a Week 4 match-up with the Kansas City Chiefs. Unfortunately, this match-up was one-sided from beginning to end, with the Chiefs’ offense being in top form, the Niners crushed by KC's defense, and the usual loudness of the stadium (via the Chiefs’ fans) also probably affected the team's ability to execute. The 49ers tried their best, but in the end, QB Damon Huard and the Kansas City Chiefs were the better team in the fight. 49ers would drop their record to 1–3

==== Week 5: vs. Oakland Raiders ====
Week 5: Oakland Raiders at San Francisco 49ers

Quarter	1	2	Total
{{{road}}}	{{{R1}}}	{{{R2}}}	**0**
{{{home}}}	{{{H1}}}	{{{H2}}}	**0**

at Monster Park, San Francisco, California

- Date: Sunday, October 8, 2006
- Game time: 1:05PM PST
- TV announcers (CBS): Gus Johnson & Steve Tasker

|weather=77 °F or 25 °C (Sunny)

|road=Raiders |R1=3|R2=10|R3=0|R4=7 |Home=49ers |H1=7|H2=0|H3=14|H4=13 |scoring= First quarter

- SF – Arnaz Battle 4-yard pass from Alex Smith (Joe Nedney kick)
- OAK – Sebastian Janikowski 33-yard field goal

Second quarter

- OAK- Sebastian Janikowski 36-yard field goal
- OAK – Randy Moss 22-yard pass from Andrew Walter (Sebastian Janikowski kick)

Third quarter

- SF – Arnaz Battle 6-yard pass from Alex Smith (Joe Nedney kick)
- SF – Maurice Hicks 33-yard pass from Alex Smith (Joe Nedney kick)

Fourth quarter

- SF – Joe Nedney 19-yard field goal
- SF – Melvin Oliver 12-yard fumble return (Joe Nedney kick)
- OAK – Courtney Anderson 8-yard pass from Marques Tuiasosopo (Sebastian Janikowski kick)
- SF – Joe Nedney 39-yard field goal

}}

Hoping to rebound from their loss in Kansas City, the 49ers went home for Week 5 as they played a Bay Area battle with the Oakland Raiders. The Niners drew first blood with QB Alex Smith throwing a 4-yard TD pass to WR Arnaz Battle, yet the Raiders would respond with kicker Sebastian Janikowski getting a 33-yard field goal for the first quarter. In the second quarter, things started to look grim, as Oakland took the lead with Janikowski kicking a 36-yard field goal, while QB Andrew Walter threw a 22-yard TD pass to WR Randy Moss. In the third quarter, the 49ers would rebound, as Smith hooked up with Battle again for a 6-yard TD pass. Later, Alex would throw a 33-yard TD pass to RB Maurice Hicks, giving San Francisco the lead. In the fourth quarter, the 49ers continued to roll, as kicker Joe Nedney kicked a 19-yard field goal, while rookie DE Melvin Oliver returned a fumble 12 yards for a touchdown. The Niners would allow one last touchdown from the Raiders, in the form of QB Marques Tuiasosopo completing an 8-yard pass to TE Courtney Anderson, but Nedney would help the Niners get win #2 with a 39-yard field goal. This beating of their Cross-bay rivals would bring the 49ers to a 2–3 record

==== Week 6: vs. San Diego Chargers ====
Week 6: San Diego Chargers at San Francisco 49ers

Quarter	1	2	3	4	Total
**Chargers**	14	21	3	10	**48**
49ers	7	12	0	0	**19**

at Monster Park, San Francisco, California

- Date: Sunday, October 15, 2006
- Game weather: 55 °F or 12.8 °C (Cloudy)

Game information
**First quarter**
- SD – Antonio Gates 57-yard pass from Philip Rivers (Nate Kaeding kick)
- SF – Bryan Gilmore 15-yard pass from Alex Smith (Joe Nedney kick)
- SD – LaDainian Tomlinson 5-yard rush (Nate Kaeding kick)

**Second quarter**

- SF – Joe Nedney 42-yard field goal
- SD – Vincent Jackson 33-yard pass from Philip Rivers (Nate Kaeding kick)
- SD – LaDainian Tomlinson 1-yard rush (Nate Kaeding kick)
- SF – Moran Norris 2-yard pass from Alex Smith (Joe Nedney kick)
- SF – Safety
- SD – LaDainian Tomlinson 1-yard rush (Nate Kaeding kick)

**Third quarter**

- SD – Nate Kaeding 24-yard field goal

**Fourth quarter**

- SD – Nate Kaeding 44-yard field goal
- SD – LaDainian Tomlinson 5-yard rush (Nate Kaeding kick)

RB LaDainian Tomlinson hurdled the goal line on one of his four touchdown runs. Tomlinson set a franchise record while spending most of the afternoon in the end zone, and QB Philip Rivers passed for a career-high 334 yards and two more scores in San Diego's 48–19 victory over San Francisco. Tomlinson got his third score 33 seconds before halftime, capping San Diego's 35-point first half and beating the 49ers (2–4) with a leap over the goal-line pile. WR Bryan Gilmore and FB Moran Norris caught scoring passes as the Chargers gave up more points in the first half alone than they allowed in any of their first four games. But San Diego shut out San Francisco in the second half, with QB Alex Smith finishing 20 of 31 for 214 yards. Two weeks after giving up 41 points to the Chiefs, the 49ers CB Walt Harris was ruled out with a hamstring injury. This put the 49ers record at 2–4.

==== Week 8: at Chicago Bears ====
Week 8: San Francisco 49ers at Chicago Bears

Quarter	1	2	3	4	Total
49ers	0	0	0	10	**10**
**Bears**	24	17	0	0	**41**

at Soldier Field, Chicago, Illinois

- Date: Sunday, October 29, 2006

Game information
**First quarter**
- CHI – Robbie Gould 43-yard field goal
- CHI – Thomas Jones 7-yard rush (Robbie Gould kick)
- CHI – Muhsin Muhammad 5-yard pass from Rex Grossman (Robbie Gould kick)
- CHI – Cedric Benson 1-yard rush (Robbie Gould kick)

**Second quarter**

- CHI – Desmond Clark 1-yard pass from Rex Grossman (Robbie Gould kick)
- CHI – Robbie Gould 36-yard field goal
- CHI – Desmond Clark 27-yard pass from Rex Grossman (Robbie Gould kick)

**Fourth quarter**

- SF – Joe Nedney 23-yard field goal
- SF – Antonio Bryant 16-yard pass from Alex Smith (Joe Nedney kick)

The Chicago Bears beat the 49ers who were coming off their Bye Week. They moved to a 24–0 first-quarter lead and 41–0 halftime cushion before scoring a 41–10 victory. San Francisco entered, giving up 32 points a game. Turnovers allowed the Bears to work from short fields. Drives started at the 15, 41 and 13, which turned into three touchdowns to take the big opening-quarter lead. The 49ers had a turnover a fourth time late in the half when WR Antonio Bryant caught a pass and fumbled the ball, with CB Ricky Manning Jr. recovering. San Francisco averted a shutout in the fourth quarter on a 23-yard field goal by K Joe Nedney and a 16-yard TD pass from Smith to WR Antonio Bryant. QB Alex Smith finished 16 of 26 for 146 yards. RB Frank Gore rushed for 111 yards on 12 carries, thanks to a 53-yard run. The 49ers then stood at 2–5.

==== Week 9: vs. Minnesota Vikings ====
Week 9: Minnesota Vikings at San Francisco 49ers

Quarter	1	2	3	4	Total
Vikings	3	0	0	0	**3**
**49ers**	0	6	0	3	**9**

at Monster Park, San Francisco, California

- Date: Sunday, November 5, 2006
- Game weather: 67 °F or 19.4 °C (Partly Cloudy)

Game information
**First quarter**
- MIN – Ryan Longwell 21-yard field goal

**Second quarter**

- SF – Joe Nedney 25-yard field goal
- SF – Joe Nedney 30-yard field goal

**Fourth quarter**

- SF – Joe Nedney 51-yard field goal

With just 238 total yards and a host of dropped passes and mistakes, the Minnesota Vikings showed every negative effect of its injury problems and a short week of preparation after Monday night's loss to New England. But count QB Brad Johnson among those shocked by the 49ers sudden defensive acumen. San Francisco managed just 133 total yards with its own offense, but got cohesive play from the same unit that gave up 41 points by halftime last week at Chicago. The 49ers simplified their game plan and hung on, stopping Minnesota's final drive with 1:04 left. QB Alex Smith passed for just 105 yards and RB Frank Gore rushed for only 41 as San Francisco hung on for its eighth straight home victory since 1988 over the Vikings, now 4–4, who'll be shaking their heads all the way back to the Twin Cities after failing to mount any significant offensive attack. QB Brad Johnson passed for 136 yards but made three turnovers for the Vikings, whose final drive ended when WR Troy Williamson dropped an on-target pass on third down before S Mark Roman and CB Shawntae Spencer prevented WR Bethel Johnson from catching a desperate pass at the goal line. K Joe Nedney left Monster Park Sunday with a game ball after accounting for all of the 49ers scoring efforts. Nedney hit from 25, 30 and 51 yards out. The 51-yarder he had to kick twice after a game clock debacle. The 49ers, now 3–5, had just enough offense to back a shocking performance by their previously porous defense (which had allowed 150 points in its last four games), led by new starting LB and NFC Defensive Player of the Week Brandon Moore, who finished with 14 tackles and 1 sack. With the win, the 49ers advanced to 3–5.

==== Week 10: at Detroit Lions ====
Week 10: San Francisco 49ers at Detroit Lions

Quarter	1	2	3	4	Total
**49ers**	10	3	3	3	**19**
Lions	0	3	7	3	**13**

at Ford Field, Detroit, Michigan

- Date: Sunday, November 12, 2006
- Game weather: Played indoors (domed stadium)

Game information
**First quarter**
- SF – Frank Gore 61-yard rush (Joe Nedney kick)
- SF – Joe Nedney 28-yard field goal

**Second quarter**

- SF – Joe Nedney 23-yard field goal
- DET – Jason Hanson 25-yard field goal

**Third quarter**

- SF – Joe Nedney 23-yard field goal
- DET – Daniel Campbell 8-yard pass from Jon Kitna(Jason Hanson kick)

**Fourth quarter**

- SF – Joe Nedney 47-yard field goal
- DET – Jason Hanson 33-yard field goal

San Francisco kept Detroit in the game with missed opportunities, then made just enough plays for a rare two-game winning streak and its first road win. RB Frank Gore set a franchise record with 148 yards rushing in the first half and scored on a 61-yard run before leaving with a concussion. San Francisco led 13–3 at halftime after scoring on three of its first four drives, wishing it had a bigger lead after out gaining Detroit 247–102 yards and recovering a fumble without giving up a turnover. The 49ers had chances to go ahead big in the third quarter because Detroit had two turnovers on its first three plays, but they came away with only a field goal and a 13-point lead. Gore then caught a 7-yard pass, wobbled off the field and didn't return. QB Alex Smith's fumble midway through the third quarter set up a score that helped the Lions get back in the game. The 49ers drove down the field to set up K Joe Nedney's fourth field goal, a key score because it made Detroit go for a TD instead of kicking a tying field goal late in the game. S Keith Lewis intercepted QB Jon Kitna's pass at the 49ers' 2 with 2½ minutes left and San Francisco now 4–5 picked up the one first down it needed to seal the game, winning consecutive games for the second time since 2003. RB Frank Gore finished with career-high 159 yards rushing and San Francisco's QB Alex Smith was 14 of 20 for 136 yards with a fumble. WR Arnaz Battle caught six passes for 55 yards, and converted a third-and-4 on the final drive to allow the 49ers to run out the clock. The 49ers' defense again came up huge, allowing only 273 total offensive yards and forcing 4 turnovers. LB Brandon Moore was yet again the story, leading the team with 9 tackles, 2 sacks and forcing 2 turnovers. With the win, the 49ers advanced to 4–5.

==== Week 11: vs. Seattle Seahawks ====
Week 11: Seattle Seahawks at San Francisco 49ers

Quarter	1	2	3	4	Total
Seahawks	0	0	7	7	**14**
**49ers**	3	17	0	0	**20**

at Monster Park, San Francisco, California

- Date: Sunday, November 19, 2006
- Game weather: 62 °F or 16.7 °C (Mostly Cloudy)

Game information
**First quarter**
- SF – Joe Nedney 39-yard field goal

**Second quarter**

- SF – Arnaz Battle 9-yard pass from Alex Smith (Joe Nedney kick)
- SF – Alex Smith 1-yard rush (Joe Nedney kick)
- SF – Joe Nedney 18-yard field goal

**Third quarter**

- SEA – Deion Branch 38-yard pass from Seneca Wallace (Josh Brown kick)

**Fourth quarter**

- SEA – Darrell Jackson 41-yard pass from Seneca Wallace (Josh Brown kick)

In their first match up of the season versus division-leading rival Seattle Seahawks, the 49ers jumped to a 20–0 lead at halftime thanks to the combined efforts of running back Frank Gore and the defense. This was the first game back from injury for Seattle running back Shaun Alexander, and he was held to just 37 rush yards. On the other side of the ball, Frank Gore ran for a career-high 212 yards on his way to topping the 1,000-yard mark for the season. The Seahawks offense turned the ball over five times during the game, including three interceptions thrown by quarterback Seneca Wallace, two of which were picked off by San Francisco cornerback Walt Harris. Alex Smith, 49ers quarterback, threw one touchdown pass and also rushed for a one-yard touchdown, the first rushing touchdown of his career. The win elevated the 49ers to a .500 record, and put them just one game out of first place in their division, behind the 6–4 Seahawks.

On the final play of the game, a pass to Seattle's fullback Mack Strong, the Seahawks attempted to continue the play which was similar to The Play which made the Cal-Stanford rivalry famous. However 49ers Rookie Marcus Hudson recovered the lateral attempt and the game was over. In a reference to The Play, radio announcers on 107.7 The Bone declared "The band is NOT on the field"

==== Week 12: at St. Louis Rams ====
Week 12: San Francisco 49ers at St. Louis Rams

Quarter	1	2	3	4	Total
49ers	0	7	7	3	**17**
**Rams**	0	13	0	7	**20**

at Edward Jones Dome, St. Louis, Missouri

- Date: Sunday, November 26, 2006
- Game weather: Played indoors (domed stadium)

Game information
**Second quarter**
- STL – Jeff Wilkins 24-yard field goal
- STL – Steven Jackson 36-yard rush (Jeff Wilkins kick)
- SF – Frank Gore 12-yard rush (Joe Nedney kick)
- STL – Jeff Wilkins 51-yard field goal

**Third quarter**

- SF – Eric Johnson 1-yard pass from Alex Smith (Joe Nedney kick)

**Fourth quarter**

- SF – Joe Nedney 24-yard field goal
- STL – Kevin Curtis 5-yard pass from Marc Bulger (Jeff Wilkins kick)

Riding high from their home upset over the Seahawks, the 49ers flew to the Edward Jones Dome for an NFC West rematch with their historic rival, the St. Louis Rams. After a scoreless first quarter, the Niners trailed early. In the second quarter, the Rams struck first with kicker Jeff Wilkins getting a 24-yard field goal, while RB Steven Jackson got a 36-yard TD run. San Francisco would get on the board with RB Frank Gore getting a 12-yard TD run, yet Wilkins gave St. Louis a 51-yard field goal as time ran out on the half. In the third quarter, the 49ers took the lead as QB Alex Smith completed a 1-yard TD pass to TE Eric Johnson for the only score of the period. In the fourth quarter, kicker Joe Nedney gave the Niners a six-point lead with a 24-yard field goal. However, the Rams would get the win with QB Marc Bulger completing a 5-yard TD pass to WR Kevin Curtis. With the loss, the 49ers fell to 5–6.

==== Week 13: at New Orleans Saints ====
Week 13: San Francisco 49ers at New Orleans Saints

Quarter	1	2	3	4	Total
49ers	3	0	7	0	**10**
**Saints**	0	14	10	10	**34**

at Louisiana Superdome, New Orleans, Louisiana

- Date: Sunday, December 3, 2006
- Game weather: Played indoors (domed stadium)

Game information
**First quarter**
- SF – Joe Nedney 29-yard field goal

**Second quarter**

- NO – Reggie Bush 1-yard rush (John Carney kick)
- NO – Reggie Bush 8-yard rush (John Carney kick)

**Third quarter**

- SF – Antonio Bryant 48-yard pass from Alex Smith (Joe Nedney kick)
- NO – John Carney 19-yard field goal
- NO – Reggie Bush 5-yard pass from Drew Brees (John Carney kick)

**Fourth quarter**

- NO – Reggie Bush 10-yard rush (John Carney kick)
- NO – John Carney 33-yard field goal

Hoping to rebound from their road loss to the Rams, the 49ers flew to the Louisiana Superdome for a Week 13 fight with the New Orleans Saints. In the first quarter, the Niners took an early lead with kicker Joe Nedney nailing a 29-yard field goal for the only score of the period. In the second quarter, the 49ers lost their lead with RB Reggie Bush's 1-yard and 8-yard TD runs. In the third quarter, San Francisco came close with QB Alex Smith's 48-yard TD pass to WR Antonio Bryant, yet New Orleans gained some distance with kicker John Carney's 19-yard field goal and QB Drew Brees' 5-yard TD pass to Bush. In the fourth quarter, the Saints wrapped things up with Bush's 10-yard run and Carney's 33-yard field goal. With their second-straight loss, the 49ers fell to 5–7.

==== Week 14: vs. Green Bay Packers ====
Week 14: Green Bay Packers at San Francisco 49ers

Quarter	1	2	3	4	Total
**Packers**	7	10	7	6	**30**
49ers	3	3	7	6	**19**

at Monster Park, San Francisco, California

- Date: Sunday, December 10, 2006
- Game weather: 59 °F or 15 °C (Mostly Cloudy)

Game information
**First quarter**
- SF – Joe Nedney 24-yard field goal
- GB – Ruvell Martin 36-yard pass from Brett Favre (Dave Rayner kick)

**Second quarter**

- GB – Dave Rayner 23-yard field goal
- GB – Ahman Green 1-yard rush (Dave Rayner kick)
- SF – Joe Nedney 36-yard field goal

**Third quarter**

- SF – Joe Nedney 36-yard field goal
- GB – Donald Driver 68-yard pass from Brett Favre (Dave Rayner kick)

**Fourth quarter**

- GB – Dave Rayner 44-yard field goal
- GB – Dave Rayner 21-yard field goal
- SF – Vernon Davis 52-yard pass from Alex Smith

Trying to end their two-game skid, the 49ers went home for a Week 14 fight with the Green Bay Packers. In the first quarter, the Niners got an early lead with kicker Joe Nedney nailing a 24-yard field goal, yet the Packers gained the lead with QB Brett Favre's 36-yard TD pass to WR Ruvell Martin. In the second quarter, San Francisco's troubles grew as Packers kicker Dave Rayner nailed a 23-yard field goal, while RB Ahman Green got a 1-yard TD run. The Niners would respond with Nedney kicking a 36-yard field goal. In the third quarter, the 49ers had RB Frank Gore get a 1-yard TD run, yet Green Bay responded with Favre completing a 68-yard TD pass to WR Donald Driver. In the fourth quarter, the Packers wrapped things up with Rayner kicking a 44-yard and a 21-yard field goal. The Niners would get a touchdown, as QB Alex Smith completed a 52-yard TD pass to rookie TE Vernon Davis, yet a botched snap foiled the following PAT. With their third-straight loss, the 49ers fell to 5–8.

==== Week 15: at Seattle Seahawks ====
Week 15: San Francisco 49ers at Seattle Seahawks

Quarter	1	2	3	4	Total
**49ers**	0	3	0	21	**24**
Seahawks	7	0	0	7	**14**

at Qwest Field, Seattle, Washington

- Date: Thursday, December 14, 2006

Game information
**First quarter**
- SEA – Shaun Alexander 3-yard rush (Josh Brown kick)

**Second quarter**

- SF – Joe Nedney 39-yard field goal

**Fourth quarter**

- SF – Vernon Davis 8-yard pass from Alex Smith (Joe Nedney kick)
- SF – Frank Gore 20-yard pass from Alex Smith (Joe Nedney kick)
- SF – Alex Smith 18-yard rush (Joe Nedney kick)
- SEA – Jerramy Stevens 22-yard pass from Matt Hasselbeck (Josh Brown kick)

Trying to end a three-game skid, the 49ers flew to Qwest Field for an NFC West rematch with the Seattle Seahawks on Thursday night. In the first quarter, the Niners started off bumpy as Seahawks RB Shaun Alexander got a 3-yard TD run for Seattle's early strike and the only score of the period. In the second quarter, San Francisco would get a field goal before halftime as kicker Joe Nedney nailed one from 39 yards out. After a scoreless third quarter, the Niners were in full force as QB Alex Smith completed an 8-yard TD pass to rookie TE Vernon Davis. Afterwards, Smith would complete a 20-yard TD pass to RB Frank Gore. Then, the 49ers wrapped the game up with Smith getting a very easy 18-yard QB sneak for a touchdown. Seattle would get one more score as QB Matt Hasselbeck completed a 22-yard TD pass to TE Jerramy Stevens. Fortunately, the Niners would get the win and the season sweep over the Seahawks. With the win, the 49ers improved to 6–8

==== Week 16: vs. Arizona Cardinals ====
Week 16: Arizona Cardinals at San Francisco 49ers

Quarter	1	2	3	4	Total
**Cardinals**	10	10	0	6	**26**
49ers	3	3	7	7	**20**

at Monster Park, San Francisco, California

- Date: Sunday, December 24, 2006
- Game weather: 51 °F or 10.6 °C (Cloudy)

Game information
**First quarter**
- SF – Joe Nedney 49-yard field goal
- AZ – Neil Rackers 25-yard field goal
- AZ - Marcel Shipp 5-yard rush (Neil Rackers kick)

**Second quarter**

- AZ – Larry Fitzgerald 6-yard pass from Matt Leinart (Neil Rackers kick)
- AZ – Neil Rackers 39-yard field goal
- SF – Joe Nedney 32-yard field goal

**Third quarter**

- SF – Frank Gore 2-yard rush (Joe Nedney kick)

**Fourth quarter**

- AZ – Neil Rackers 37-yard field goal
- AZ – Neil Rackers 32-yard field goal
- SF – Frank Gore 1-yard rush (Joe Nedney kick)

Following their road win over the Seahawks, and hoping to clinch a playoff spot, the 49ers went home for an NFC West rematch with the Arizona Cardinals. In the first quarter, the Niners struck first with kicker Joe Nedney getting a 49-yard field goal, yet the Cardinals took the lead with kicker Neil Rackers getting a 25-yard field goal, along with RB Marcel Shipp's 5-yard TD run. In the second quarter, things continued to get worse for the 49ers as QB Matt Leinart completed a 6-yard to WR Larry Fitzgerald, along with Rackers nailing a 39-yard field goal. The Niners would be able get a field goal before halftime as Nedney kicked from 32 yards out. In the third quarter, San Francisco started to come back as RB Frank Gore got a 2-yard TD run for the only score of the period. In the fourth quarter, Arizona increased its lead as Rackers was awarded a missed 37-yard field goal and was successful in kicking a 32-yard field goal. Even though Gore managed to get a 1-yard TD run, the Niners fell short of a comeback. With the loss, the 49ers fell to 6–9, securing them their fourth consecutive losing season.

==== Week 17: at Denver Broncos ====
Week 17: San Francisco 49ers at Denver Broncos

Quarter	1	2	3	4	OT	Total
**49ers**	0	3	14	6	3	**26**
Broncos	3	10	3	7	0	**23**

at Invesco Field at Mile High, Denver, Colorado

- Date: Sunday, December 31, 2006

Game information
**First quarter**
- DEN – Jason Elam 22-yard field goal

**Second quarter**

- DEN – Jason Elam 21-yard field goal
- DEN – Champ Bailey 70-yard interception return (Jason Elam kick)
- SF – Joe Nedney 46-yard field goal

**Third quarter**

- SF – Moran Norris 32-yard pass from Alex Smith (Joe Nedney kick)
- SF – Walt Harris 28-yard interception return (Joe Nedney kick)
- DEN – Jason Elam 22-yard field goal

**Fourth quarter**

- SF – Joe Nedney 29-yard field goal
- SF – Joe Nedney 46-yard field goal
- DEN – Tony Scheffler 9-yard pass from Jay Cutler (Jason Elam kick)

**Overtime**

- SF – Joe Nedney 36-yard field goal

Trying to end their season on a positive note, the 49ers flew to Invesco Field at Mile High to take on the playoff hopeful Denver Broncos. In the first quarter, the Broncos struck first with kicker Jason Elam getting a 22-yard field goal for the only score of the period. In the second quarter, Denver continued its dominance with Elam kicking a 21-yard field goal, while CB Champ Bailey returned an interception 70 yards for a touchdown. The Niners would get a field goal before halftime as kicker Joe Nedney got one from 46 yards out. In the third quarter, San Francisco took the lead as QB Alex Smith completed a 32-yard TD pass to RB Moran Norris, while CB Walt Harris returned an interception 28 yards for a touchdown. The Broncos would sneak close with Elam kicking a 22-yard field goal. In the fourth quarter, Nedney gave the Niners a little cushion with a 29-yard and a 46-yard field goal. However, Denver managed to tie the game with QB Jay Cutler completing a 9-yard TD pass to TE Tony Scheffler. The game would go to overtime, where both sides fought hard and fierce as the period wore on. San Francisco eventually prevailed with two minutes remaining as Nedney helped knock the Broncos out of the playoff picture with a game-winning 36-yard field goal. With the win, the 49ers ended their season at 7–9.

=== Standings ===
NFC West
	W	L	T	PCT	DIV	CONF	PF	PA	STK
^{(4)} Seattle Seahawks	9	7	0	.563	3–3	7–5	335	341	W1
St. Louis Rams	8	8	0	.500	2–4	6–6	367	381	W3
San Francisco 49ers	7	9	0	.438	3–3	5–7	298	412	W1
Arizona Cardinals	5	11	0	.313	4–2	5–7	314	389	L1
