= 2008 San Francisco 49ers season =

American football team season

- Owner: John York
- General manager: Scot McCloughan
- Head coach: Mike Nolan (fired October 20, 2–5 record); Mike Singletary (interim, 5–4 record)
- Offensive coordinator: Mike Martz
- Defensive coordinator: Greg Manusky
- Home stadium: Candlestick Park

Results
- Record: 7–9
- Division place: 2nd NFC West
- Playoffs: Did not qualify
- All-Pros: ILB Patrick Willis (2nd team)
- Pro Bowlers: ILB Patrick Willis

Uniform

The 2008 season was the San Francisco 49ers' 59th in the National Football League (NFL), their 63rd overall, and their fourth and final under the head coach Mike Nolan. The team improved on their 5–11 record from the 2007 season, and ended the season with a 7–9 record. They failed to reach the playoffs for the sixth consecutive season. It was the final season that the 49ers wore their 1996 cardinal red uniforms as they reverted back to using a scarlet shade of red before the 2009 season, which is very similar to the color they used from 1964-1995. With the 49ers offense struggling the previous season, offensive coordinator Jim Hostler was fired and replaced by Mike Martz. In addition, Scot McCloughan was promoted from vice president of player personnel to general manager. Nolan was fired after a 29–17 loss to the New York Giants in Week 8 and was replaced by assistant head coach and linebackers coach Mike Singletary.

== Offseason ==
=== Signings ===
Pos.	Player	Free Agent Type	2007 Team	Contract
WR	Isaac Bruce	Released	St. Louis Rams	2 years, $6 million
RB	DeShaun Foster	Released	Carolina Panthers	2 years, $1.8 million
LB	Roderick Green	UFA	San Francisco 49ers	1 year
QB	Shaun Hill	UFA	San Francisco 49ers	3 years, $6 million
WR	Bryant Johnson	UFA	Arizona Cardinals	1 year
QB	J. T. O'Sullivan	UFA	Detroit Lions	1 year, $645,000
CB	Allen Rossum	Released	Pittsburgh Steelers	1 year, $870,000
DE	Justin Smith	UFA	Cincinnati Bengals	6 years, $45 million
DT	Isaac Sopoaga	UFA	San Francisco 49ers	5 years, $20 million
CB	Donald Strickland	UFA	San Francisco 49ers	1 year, $800,000
LB	Dontarrious Thomas	UFA	Minnesota Vikings	2 years

=== Departures ===
Pos.	Player	Free Agent Type	2008 Team	Contract
QB	Trent Dilfer	Retired		
DE	Marques Douglas	UFA	Tampa Bay Buccaneers	4 years
T	Kwame Harris	UFA	Oakland Raiders	3 years, $16 million
RB	Maurice Hicks	UFA	Minnesota Vikings	3 years
WR	Darrell Jackson	Released	Denver Broncos	1 year, $1.5 million
G	Justin Smiley	UFA	Miami Dolphins	5 years, $25 million
LB	Derek Smith	Released	San Diego Chargers	Undisclosed
DT	Bryant Young	Retired		

UFA: Unrestricted free agent; RFA: Restricted free agent; ERFA: Exclusive rights free agent

=== NFL draft ===
2008 San Francisco 49ers draft
Round	Pick	Player	Position	College	Notes
1	29	Kentwan Balmer	DT	North Carolina	From Indianapolis
2	39	Chilo Rachal	G	USC	
3	75	Reggie Smith	CB	Oklahoma	
4	107	Cody Wallace	C	Texas A&M	Made roster in 2009
6	174	Josh Morgan	WR	Virginia Tech	
7	214	Larry Grant	LB	Ohio State	
Made roster

== Staff ==
2008 San Francisco 49ers staff
Front office {{{front_office}}} Head coaches: Head coach – Mike Nolan; Assistant Head Coach-Defense/Linebackers (Interim Head Coach) – Mike Singletary; Assistant to the head coach/quarterbacks – Ted Tollner; Offensive coaches: Offensive coordinator/quarterbacks – Mike Martz; Running backs – Tony Nathan; Senior assistant/wide receivers – Jerry Sullivan; Tight ends – Pete Hoener; Offensive line – George Warhop; Offensive line – Chris Foerster; Offensive assistant – Adam Gase; Offensive quality control – Shane Day	Defensive coaches: Defensive coordinator – Greg Manusky; Defensive line – Jim Tomsula; Defensive backs/secondary – Johnnie Lynn; Defensive backs – Vance Joseph; Defensive assistant/outside linebackers – Jason Tarver; Special teams coaches: Special teams coordinator – Al Everest; Assistant special teams – Dave Fipp; Strength and conditioning: Strength and conditioning – Duane Carlisle; Assistant strength and conditioning – Mark Uyeyama; Head athletic trainer – Jeff Ferguson

== Roster ==
2008 San Francisco 49ers roster
Quarterbacks (QB): 13 Shaun Hill; 10 Jamie Martin; 14 J. T. O'Sullivan; Running backs (RB): 33 Thomas Clayton; 29 DeShaun Foster; 21 Frank Gore; 24 Michael Robinson; Wide receivers (WR): 88 Isaac Bruce; 89 Jason Hill; 82 Bryant Johnson; 84 Josh Morgan; 17 Dominique Zeigler; Tight ends (TE): 47 Billy Bajema; 85 Vernon Davis; 81 Sean Ryan; 46 Delanie Walker	Offensive linemen (OL): 64 David Baas G; 72 Jacob Bender T; 66 Eric Heitmann C; 62 Chilo Rachal G; 65 Barry Sims T; 68 Adam Snyder G/T; 74 Joe Staley T; 59 Cody Wallace C; 69 Tony Wragge G; Defensive linemen (DL): 96 Kentwan Balmer DE; 93 Ronald Fields DT; 92 Aubrayo Franklin DT; 98 Parys Haralson DE; 91 Ray McDonald DE; 94 Justin Smith DE; 90 Isaac Sopoaga DT	Linebackers (LB): 95 Tully Banta-Cain OLB; 55 Ahmad Brooks MLB; 54 Roderick Green OLB; 99 Manny Lawson OLB; 51 Takeo Spikes OLB; 53 Jeff Ulbrich OLB; 52 Patrick Willis MLB; Defensive backs (DB): 25 Tarell Brown CB; 22 Nate Clements CB; 38 Dashon Goldson SS; 27 Walt Harris CB; 23 Marcus Hudson CB; 28 Keith Lewis FS; 32 Michael Lewis SS; 26 Mark Roman FS; 20 Allen Rossum CB; 31 Reggie Smith CB; 30 Donald Strickland CB; Special teams (ST): 86 Brian Jennings LS; 4 Andy Lee P; 6 Joe Nedney K	Practice squad: 44 Eric Bakhtiari LB; 19 Mark Bradford WR; 49 Joe Jon Finley TE; 76 Ramiro Pruneda T; 40 Justin Roland LB; 35 Carl Stewart FB; 61 Joe Toledo T; Reserve: 83 Arnaz Battle WR (IR); 63 Damane Duckett T (IR); 75 Jonas Jennings T (IR); 45 Zak Keasey FB (IR); 58 Jay Moore LB (IR); 11 Alex Smith QB (IR); 36 Shawntae Spencer CB (IR); Rookies in italics 53 active, 7 reserve, 7 practice squad

== Preseason ==
Week	Date	Opponent	Result	Record	Game site	NFL.com recap
1	August 8	at Oakland Raiders	L 6–18	0–1	Oakland–Alameda County Coliseum	Recap
2	August 16	Green Bay Packers	W 34–6	1–1	Candlestick Park	Recap
3	August 21	at Chicago Bears	W 37–30	2–1	Soldier Field	Recap
4	August 29	San Diego Chargers	L 17–20	2–2	Candlestick Park	Recap

== Regular season ==
=== Schedule ===
Week	Date	Opponent	Result	Record	Game site	NFL.com recap
1	September 7	**Arizona Cardinals**	**L** 13–23	0–1	Candlestick Park	Recap
2	September 14	at **Seattle Seahawks**	**W** 33–30 (OT)	1–1	Qwest Field	Recap
3	September 21	Detroit Lions	**W** 31–13	2–1	Candlestick Park	Recap
4	September 28	at New Orleans Saints	**L** 17–31	2–2	Louisiana Superdome	Recap
5	October 5	New England Patriots	**L** 21–30	2–3	Candlestick Park	Recap
6	October 12	Philadelphia Eagles	**L** 26–40	2–4	Candlestick Park	Recap
7	October 19	at New York Giants	**L** 17–29	2–5	Giants Stadium	Recap
8	October 26	**Seattle Seahawks**	**L** 13–34	2–6	Candlestick Park	Recap
9	Bye					
10	November 10	at **Arizona Cardinals**	**L** 24–29	2–7	University of Phoenix Stadium	Recap
11	November 16	**St. Louis Rams**	**W** 35–16	3–7	Candlestick Park	Recap
12	November 23	at Dallas Cowboys	**L** 22–35	3–8	Texas Stadium	Recap
13	November 30	at Buffalo Bills	**W** 10–3	4–8	Ralph Wilson Stadium	Recap
14	December 7	New York Jets	**W** 24–14	5–8	Candlestick Park	Recap
15	December 14	at Miami Dolphins	**L** 9–14	5–9	Dolphin Stadium	Recap
16	December 21	at **St. Louis Rams**	**W** 17–16	6–9	Edward Jones Dome	Recap
17	December 28	Washington Redskins	**W** 27–24	7–9	Candlestick Park	Recap
Note: Intra-division opponents are in **bold** text.

=== Game summaries ===
==== Week 1: vs. Arizona Cardinals ====
Quarter	1	2	3	4	Total
**Cardinals**	3	7	10	3	**23**
49ers	7	3	3	0	**13**

at Candlestick Park, San Francisco

- Game time: 4:15 pm EST/1:15 pm PST
- Game weather: 68 °F (20 °C) (Sunny)
- Game attendance: 67,186
- Referee: Gene Steratore
- TV announcers (Fox): Sam Rosen, Tim Ryan and Chris Myers

The 49ers began their 2008 campaign at home against their NFC West foe, the Arizona Cardinals. In the first quarter, the Niners trailed early as Cardinals kicker Neil Rackers got a 25-yard field goal. San Francisco responded with RB Frank Gore getting a 41-yard TD run. In the second quarter, Arizona regained the lead with QB Kurt Warner completing a 1-yard TD pass to WR Larry Fitzgerald. San Francisco tied the game with kicker Joe Nedney getting a 39-yard field goal. In the third quarter, the Cardinals began to fly away as Rackers nailed a 31-yard field goal, along with RB Tim Hightower getting a 2-yard TD run. In the fourth quarter, the Niners tried to respond as Nedney got a 30-yard field goal. However, Arizona pulled away with Rackers' 30-yard field goal.

With the loss, the 49ers began their season at 0–1.

==== Week 2: at Seattle Seahawks ====
Quarter	1	2	3	4	OT	Total
**49ers**	3	10	14	3	3	**33**
Seahawks	14	6	0	10	0	**30**

at Qwest Field, Seattle, Washington

- Game time: 4:05 pm EST/1:05 pm PST
- Game weather: 67 °F (19 °C) (Sunny)
- Game attendance: 67,951
- Referee: Jerome Boger
- TV announcers (Fox): Kenny Albert, Daryl Johnston, & Tony Siragusa

Hoping to bounce back from their divisional home loss to the Cardinals, the 49ers flew to Qwest Field for an NFC West duel with the Seattle Seahawks. In the first quarter, the Niners trailed early as Seahawks RB Julius Jones got a 27-yard TD run, along with DT Craig Terrill returning a fumble 10 yards for a touchdown. San Francisco responded with kicker Joe Nedney getting a 26-yard field goal. In the second quarter, the 49ers continued to close in on Seattle as Nedney kicked a 28-yard field goal. The Seahawks responded with kicker Olindo Mare getting a 51-yard field goal. Afterwards, the Niners chopped at Seattle's lead with QB J.T. O'Sullivan completing a 3-yard TD pass to WR Bryant Johnson. The Seahawks closed out the half with Mare's 38-yard field goal.

In the third quarter, San Francisco took the lead with LB Patrick Willis returning an interception 86 yards for a touchdown and RB Frank Gore getting a 2-yard TD run. However, in the fourth quarter, Seattle regained its lead with RB T.J. Duckett getting a 1-yard TD run and Mare getting a 32-yard field goal. The Niners tied the game with Nedney's 28-yard field goal. Afterwards, in overtime, San Francisco completed its upset as Nedney nailed the game-winning 40-yard field goal.

With the win, the 49ers improved to 1–1.

WR Isaac Bruce (4 receptions for 153 yards) became the first 49ers wideout to have a 100-yard receiving game since Antonio Bryant during Week 2 in 2006.

==== Week 3: vs. Detroit Lions ====
Quarter	1	2	3	4	Total
Lions	0	3	3	7	**13**
**49ers**	7	14	0	10	**31**

at Candlestick Park, San Francisco

- Game time: 1:05 pm PDT
- Game weather: 66 °F (19 °C) (Sunny)
- Game attendance: 67,249
- Referee: Bill Leavy
- TV announcers (Fox): Dick Stockton, Brian Baldinger, and Brian Billick

Coming off their thrilling overtime divisional road win over the Seahawks, the 49ers went home for a Week 3 duel with the Detroit Lions. In the first quarter, the Niners struck first as QB J.T. O'Sullivan completed a 6-yard TD pass to WR Isaac Bruce. In the second quarter, San Francisco increased its lead with RB Frank Gore getting a 4-yard TD run. Striking again, Delanie Walker caught a touchdown pass shortly before half-time. The Lions responded with a 44-yard field goal by kicker Jason Hanson, yet the 49ers replied in the fourth quarter with CB Allen Rossum getting a 1-yard TD run. Detroit tried to rally as QB Jon Kitna completed a 34-yard TD pass to RB Rudi Johnson, but San Francisco sealed their victory with kicker Joe Nedney nailing a 25-yard field goal.

With the win, the 49ers improved to 2–1.

==== Week 4: at New Orleans Saints ====
Quarter	1	2	3	4	Total
49ers	3	3	3	8	**17**
**Saints**	0	21	0	10	**31**

at Louisiana Superdome, New Orleans

- Game time: 1:00 pm EDT/10:00 pm PDT
- Game weather: None (Domed Stadium)
- Game attendance: 70,008
- Referee: Jeff Triplette
- TV announcers (Fox): Sam Rosen and Tim Ryan

Coming off their home win over the Lions, the 49ers flew to the Louisiana Superdome for a Week 4 duel with the New Orleans Saints. In the first quarter, the Niners struck first as kicker Joe Nedney got a 47-yard field goal. In the second quarter, the Saints took the lead with QB Drew Brees completing a 5-yard and a 33-yard TD pass to WR Lance Moore. San Francisco answered with Nedney's 49-yard field goal, yet New Orleans replied with Brees' 47-yard TD pass to WR Robert Meachem.

In the third quarter, the 49ers tried to rally as Nedney kicked a 38-yard field goal. However, in the fourth quarter, the Saints continued to pull away as RB Deuce McAllister got a 1-yard TD run. The Niners tried to rally as QB J.T. O'Sullivan completed a 5-yard TD pass to WR Isaac Bruce, yet New Orleans sealed the win with kicker Martín Gramática nailing a 31-yard field goal.

With the loss, the 49ers fell to 2–2.

==== Week 5: vs. New England Patriots ====
Quarter	1	2	3	4	Total
**Patriots**	7	10	7	6	**30**
49ers	14	0	0	7	**21**

at Candlestick Park, San Francisco

- Game time: 4:15 pm. EDT/1:15 pm PDT
- Game weather: 69 °F (21 °C) (Sunny)
- Game attendance: 67,650
- Referee: Mike Carey
- TV announcers (CBS): Dick Enberg, Randy Cross, & Dan Fouts

Hoping to rebound from their road loss to the Saints, the 49ers went home for a Week 5 interconference duel with the New England Patriots. In the first quarter, the Niners struck first as QB J.T. O'Sullivan completed a 16-yard TD pass to RB Frank Gore. The Patriots responded with QB Matt Cassel completing a 66-yard TD pass to WR Randy Moss, yet San Francisco answered with O'Sullivan completing a 35-yard TD pass to WR Isaac Bruce. In the second quarter, New England took the lead as kicker Stephen Gostkowski got a 35-yard field goal, along with RB Kevin Faulk getting a 2-yard TD run.

In the third quarter, the Patriots increased their lead with Faulk getting another 2-yard TD run. In the fourth quarter, New England added on to its lead with Gostkowski kicking a 40-yard field goal. The Niners tried to come back as O'Sullivan completed a 5-yard TD pass to Bruce, but the Patriots pulled away with Gostkowski nailing a 49-yard field goal.

With the loss, San Francisco fell to 2–3.

During the halftime ceremony, the 49ers retired former QB Steve Young's #8 uniform.

==== Week 6: vs. Philadelphia Eagles ====
Quarter	1	2	3	4	Total
**Eagles**	7	10	0	23	**40**
49ers	6	10	10	0	**26**

at Candlestick Park, San Francisco

- Game time: 4:15 pm EDT
- Game weather: 68 °F (20 °C) (Sunny)
- Game attendance: 67,640
- Referee: Ron Winter
- TV announcers (Fox): Sam Rosen and Tim Ryan

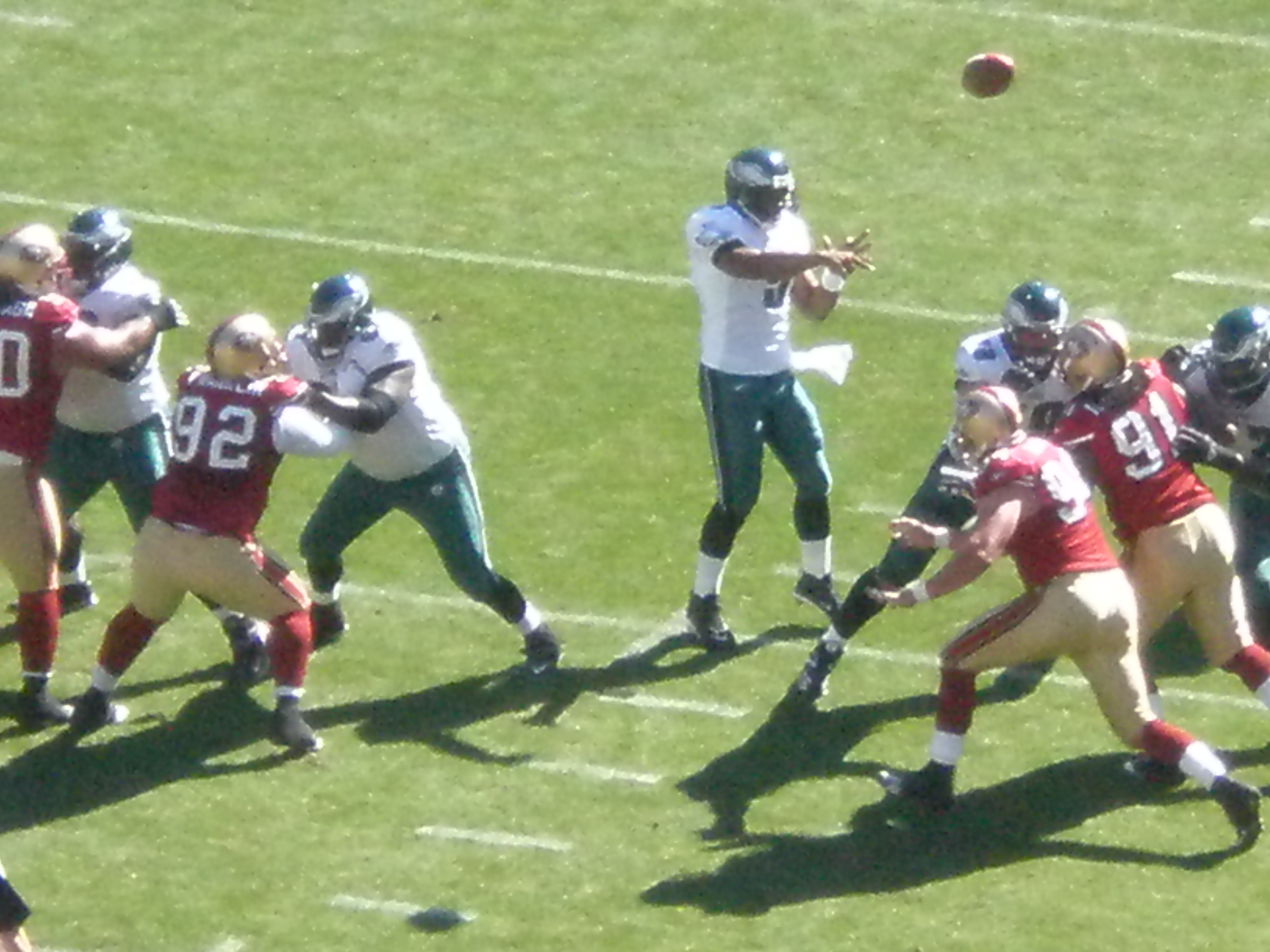
McNabb throws a pass

Hoping to snap a two-game losing skid, the 49ers stayed at home for a Week 6 duel with the Philadelphia Eagles. In the first quarter, the Niners struck first as kicker Joe Nedney got a 32-yard field goal. The Eagles took the lead as RB Correll Buckhalter got a 1-yard TD run. San Francisco responded with a 37-yard field goal by Nedney. In the second quarter, Philadelphia increased their lead as QB Donovan McNabb completed a 2-yard TD pass to WR Hank Baskett, along with kicker David Akers getting a 19-yard field goal. The 49ers closed out the half with Nedney making a 53-yard field goal, along with DB Donald Strickland returning a blocked field goal attempt 41 yards for a touchdown.

In the third quarter, the Niners took the lead as RB Frank Gore got a 6-yard TD run, along with Nedney getting a 29-yard field goal. However, in the fourth quarter, the Eagles rallied as McNabb completed a 2-yard TD pass to TE L.J. Smith, Akers nailing a 38-yard, a 25-yard, & a 28-yard field goal, and DE Juqua Parker returning an interception 55 yards for a touchdown.

With their third-straight loss, the 49ers fell to 2–4.

==== Week 7: at New York Giants ====
Quarter	1	2	3	4	Total
49ers	3	7	7	0	**17**
**Giants**	7	10	7	5	**29**

at Giants Stadium, East Rutherford, New Jersey

- Game time: 1:00 pm EST/10:00 am PST
- Game weather: 51 °F (11 °C) (Sunny)
- Game attendance: 78,676
- Referee: Walt Anderson
- TV announcers (Fox): Dick Stockton and Troy Aikman

Trying to snap a three-game losing skid, the 49ers flew to Giants Stadium for a Week 7 duel with the New York Giants. In the first quarter, the Niners trailed early as Giants RB Brandon Jacobs got a 26-yard TD run. San Francisco responded with a 40-yard field goal by kicker Joe Nedney. In the second quarter, New York answered with Jacobs getting a 2-yard TD run. The 49ers responded with QB J.T. O'Sullivan completing a 30-yard TD pass to rookie WR Josh Morgan. The Giants ended the half with kicker John Carney nailing a 21-yard field goal.

In the third quarter, New York increased its lead with QB Eli Manning completing a 6-yard TD pass to WR Plaxico Burress. The Niners struck back as CB Nate Clements returned a block field goal 74 yards for a touchdown. However, in the fourth quarter, the Giants pulled away as Carney got a 48-yard field goal, while DE Justin Tuck forced O'Sullivan into a fumble, causing the ball to roll into San Francisco's endzone, and Morgan kicking it out of the back of the endzone, giving New York a safety.

With the fourth-straight loss, the 49ers fell to 2–5.

On Monday, October 20, the day after the game, the 49ers fired coach Mike Nolan and replaced him with Mike Singletary.

==== Week 8: vs. Seattle Seahawks ====
Quarter	1	2	3	4	Total
**Seahawks**	6	14	7	7	**34**
49ers	0	3	3	7	**13**

at Candlestick Park, San Francisco

- Game time: 4:15 p.m. EDT
- Game weather: 64 °F (18 °C) (Sunny)
- Game attendance: 67,504
- Referee: Terry McAulay
- TV announcers (Fox): Ron Pitts and Tony Boselli

Hoping to rebound from their road loss to the Giants, the 49ers went home for a Week 8 NFC West rematch with the Seattle Seahawks. In the first quarter, the Niners trailed early as Seahawks kicker Olindo Mare got a 43-yard and a 42-yard field goal. In the second quarter, Seattle increased its lead with RB T.J. Duckett getting a 1-yard TD run. San Francisco got on the board with kicker Joe Nedney getting a 42-yard field goal, but the Seahawks continued its beatdown as CB Josh Wilson returned an interception 75 yards for a touchdown.

In the third quarter, the 49ers replied with Nedney making a 40-yard field goal, yet Seattle continued to pull away as QB Seneca Wallace completed a 43-yard TD pass to FB Leonard Weaver. In the fourth quarter, San Francisco tried to rally as QB Shaun Hill completed a 2-yard TD pass to rookie WR Jason Hill. However, the Seahawks pulled away as Wallace hooked up with Weaver again on a 62-yard TD pass.

During the game, Vernon Davis committed a 15-yard penalty for unsportsmanlike conduct which prompted what would later become an infamous tirade by Singletary during the post-game press conference. Singletary addressed benching Davis by stating: "I'd rather play with 10 people and just get penalized all the way until we have to do something else rather than play with 11 when I know that right now that person is not sold out to be a part of this team. It is more about them than it is about the team. Cannot play with them, cannot win with them, cannot coach with them. Can't do it. I want winners. I want people that want to win."

With the loss, the 49ers entered their bye week at 2–6.

==== Week 10: at Arizona Cardinals ====
Quarter	1	2	3	4	Total
49ers	7	14	3	0	**24**
**Cardinals**	3	10	7	9	**29**

at University of Phoenix Stadium, Glendale, Arizona

- Game time: 8:30 p.m. EDT/5:30 pm PST
- Game weather: 62 °F (17 °C) (Clear)
- Game attendance: 64,519
- Referee: Tony Corrente
- TV announcers (ESPN): Mike Tirico, Ron Jaworski, and Tony Kornheiser

Coming off their bye week, the 49ers flew to the University of Phoenix Stadium for a Week 10 NFC West rematch with the Arizona Cardinals. Due to J.T. O'Sullivan's inconsistency, QB Shaun Hill was named the starter for the game.

In the first quarter, the Niners immediately struck first as CB Allen Rossum returned the game's opening kickoff 104 yards for a touchdown. The Cardinals answered with a 28-yard field goal by kicker Neil Rackers. In the second quarter, San Francisco increased their lead as Hill completed a 31-yard TD pass to rookie WR Josh Morgan. Arizona responded with QB Kurt Warner completing a 13-yard TD pass to WR Anquan Boldin, along with Rackers making a 33-yard field goal. The Niners closed out the first half scoring with Hill completing an 18-yard TD pass to TE Vernon Davis.

In the third quarter, the Cardinals tried to catch up as Warner completed a 5-yard TD pass to WR Larry Fitzgerald, yet the 49ers answered with kicker Joe Nedney getting a 41-yard field goal. In the fourth quarter, Arizona took the lead as Racker nailed a 23-yard field goal, along with Warner hooking with Boldin again on a 4-yard TD pass (with a failed 2-point conversion). San Francisco did manage to get a late-game drive. However, the Cardinals' defense made a goal-line stand to end the game.

With their sixth straight loss, the 49ers fell to 2–7.

==== Week 11: vs. St. Louis Rams ====
Quarter	1	2	3	4	Total
Rams	0	3	6	7	**16**
**49ers**	7	28	0	0	**35**

at Candlestick Park, San Francisco

- Game time: 4:05 pm EDT/1:05 pm PST
- Game weather: 75 °F (24 °C) (Sunny)
- Game attendance: 67,573
- Referee: Alberto Riveron
- TV announcers (Fox): Matt Vasgersian, J.C. Pearson, & Nischelle Turner

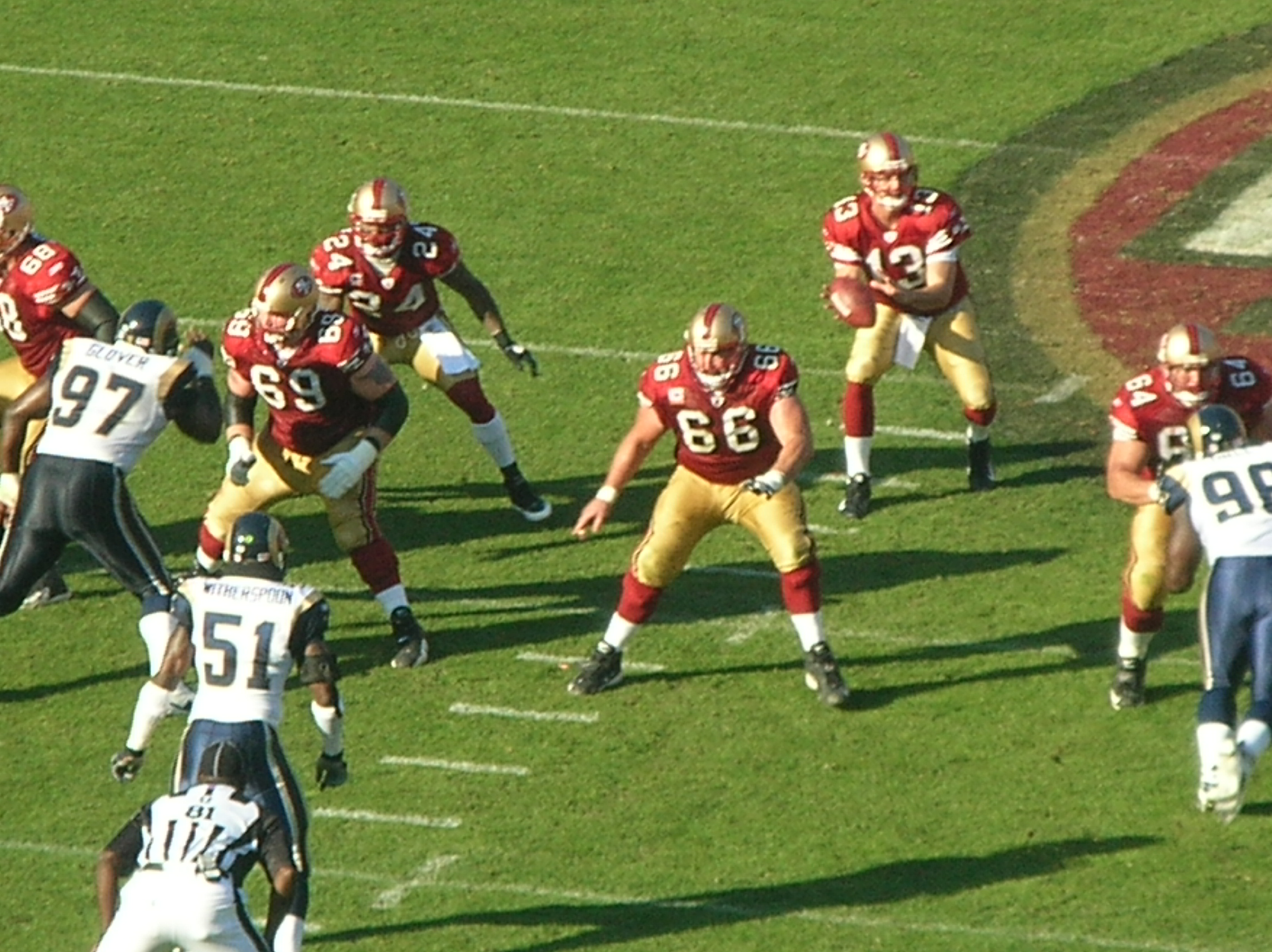
Hill takes a snap

Trying to snap a six-game losing streak, the 49ers went home for a Week 11 NFC West duel with their hated rival, the St. Louis Rams. In the first quarter, the Niners struck first as RB Frank Gore got a 5-yard TD run. In the second quarter, the Rams responded with kicker Josh Brown getting a 24-yard field goal. Afterwards, San Francisco unleashed its frustrations as QB Shaun Hill completed a 2-yard TD pass to TE Vernon Davis, Gore got a 1-yard TD run, Hill got a 1-yard TD run, and Hill completed a 2-yard TD pass to WR Bryant Johnson.

In the third quarter, St. Louis got a 48-yard and a 44-yard field goal. In the fourth quarter QB Marc Bulger completed a 2-yard TD pass to WR Dane Looker. The 49ers had deployed most of the second string roster for the 4th quarter.

Shaun Hill had a perfect passer rating in the first half and a career-high 47-yard completion. Hill also won NFC Offensive Player of the Week.

With their six-game losing streak snapped, the 49ers improved to 3–7.

==== Week 12: at Dallas Cowboys ====
Quarter	1	2	3	4	Total
49ers	6	0	3	13	**22**
**Cowboys**	0	22	7	6	**35**

at Texas Stadium, Irving, Texas

- Game time: 1:00 pm EDT/10:00 am PST
- Game weather: 64 °F (18 °C) (Partly Cloudy)
- Game attendance: 63,272
- Referee: Mike Carey
- TV announcers (Fox): Joe Buck, Troy Aikman, & Pam Oliver

Coming off their divisional home win over the Rams, the 49ers flew to Texas Stadium for a Week 12 game with the throwback-clad Dallas Cowboys. In the first quarter, the Niners struck first as kicker Joe Nedney got a 23-yard and a 22-yard field goal. In the second quarter, the Cowboys took the lead as QB Tony Romo completed a 75-yard TD pass to former 49ers WR Terrell Owens. Dallas continued its domination as LB Carlos Polk blocked punter Andy Lee's punt into the back of the endzone for a safety. The Cowboys closed out its period of power as kicker Nick Folk got a 48-yard and a 41-yard field goal, along with Romo completing a 1-yard TD pass to TE Martellus Bennett.

In the third quarter, Dallas increased its lead with Romo completing a 10-yard TD pass to WR Patrick Crayton. San Francisco tried to rally as Nedney got a 35-yard field goal. In the fourth quarter, the Cowboys answered with Folk getting a 47-yard field goal. The 49ers tried to come back as QB Shaun Hill completed an 18-yard TD pass to WR Isaac Bruce, but Dallas replied with Folk nailing a 42-yard field goal. The Niners tried to rally as Hill completed a 9-yard TD pass to RB DeShaun Foster, but that was as close as San Francisco's comeback got.

With the loss, the 49ers fell to 3–8.

==== Week 13: at Buffalo Bills ====
Quarter	1	2	3	4	Total
**49ers**	7	3	0	0	**10**
Bills	0	0	3	0	**3**

at Ralph Wilson Stadium, Orchard Park, New York

- Game time: 1:00 pm EDT/10:00 am PST
- Game weather: 38 °F (3 °C) (Mostly Cloudy)
- Game attendance: 70,988
- Referee: Bill Carollo
- TV announcers (Fox): Ron Pitts, Tony Boselli, & Charissa Thompson

Hoping to rebound from their road loss to the Cowboys, the 49ers flew to Ralph Wilson Stadium for a Week 13 interconference duel with the Buffalo Bills. In the first quarter, the Niners struck first as QB Shaun Hill completed a 12-yard TD pass to WR Isaac Bruce. In the second quarter, San Francisco increased their lead as kicker Joe Nedney got a 50-yard field goal. In the third quarter, the Bills tried to rally as kicker Rian Lindell nailed a 22-yard field goal. The Niners' defense held Buffalo's offense scoreless for the remainder of the game.

With the win, not only did the 49ers improve to 4–8, but they finally gave the West Coast its first East Coast win.

==== Week 14: vs. New York Jets ====
Quarter	1	2	3	4	Total
Jets	0	7	7	0	**14**
**49ers**	7	7	0	10	**24**

at Candlestick Park, San Francisco

- Game time: 1:05 pm PST
- Game weather: 54 °F (12 °C) (Cloudy)
- Referee: Ed Hochuli
- TV announcers (CBS): Jim Nantz & Phil Simms

Returning to Candlestick Park, the 49ers geared up for a rematch against Brett Favre and his new team. The game started when the 49ers attempted an onside kick, recovered by the Jets. Later, the 49ers went up first as Shaun Hill completed a pass to Jason Hill that was fumbled at the goal line and recovered by offensive tackle Joe Staley for the touchdown. Then, Brett Favre ran for a 2-yard touchdown. The 49ers retook the lead as Shaun Hill completed a touchdown screen pass to Frank Gore. After half-time, Thomas Jones plowed through the 49ers secondary to get a 17-yard score.

On the ensuing 49ers possession, a Shaun Hill touchdown pass to Delanie Walker was called back, and the 49ers settled for a Joe Nedney 32-yard field goal. In the fourth quarter, the 49ers cemented their lead when Shaun Hill completed a 3-yard touchdown pass to a diving Bryant Johnson. The Jets had enough time to make a late comeback, but a Brett Favre deep pass was intercepted by Walt Harris. The 49ers ran down the clock and punted, and the Jets did not have sufficient time to attempt the comeback. The 49ers fumbled the ball a total of 5 times, although they lost only one.

With the win, the 49ers improved to 5–8. However, they were officially eliminated from playoff contention with the Arizona Cardinals win against the St. Louis Rams, clinching the NFC West for Arizona.

==== Week 15: at Miami Dolphins ====
Quarter	1	2	3	4	Total
49ers	3	0	3	3	**9**
**Dolphins**	7	7	0	0	**14**

at Dolphin Stadium, Miami Gardens, Florida

- Game time: 1:00 pm EST/10:00 am PST
- Game weather: 77 °F (25 °C) (Cloudy)
- Referee: Scott Green
- TV announcers (Fox): Sam Rosen, Tim Ryan, & Chris Myers

==== Week 16: at St. Louis Rams ====
Quarter	1	2	3	4	Total
**49ers**	3	0	0	14	**17**
Rams	0	13	0	3	**16**

at Edward Jones Dome, St. Louis, Missouri

- Game time: 12:00 pm CST/10:00 am PST
- Game weather: None (Domed Stadium)
- Game attendance: 54,948
- Referee: Carl Cheffers
- TV announcers (Fox): Sam Rosen, Tim Ryan, & Chris Myers

Hoping to rebound from their loss to the Dolphins, the 49ers flew to the Edward Jones Dome for a Week 16 NFC West rematch with the awful Rams. In the first quarter, the Niners struck first with a 48-yard field goal from kicker Joe Nedney. The Rams took the lead in the second quarter with kicker Josh Brown's 43-yard field goal, quarterback Marc Bulger's 30-yard touchdown pass to wide receiver Keenan Burton, and Brown's 38-yard field goal. After a scoreless third quarter, St. Louis increased its lead in the fourth quarter with Brown nailing a 22-yard field goal. Afterwards, San Francisco took the lead with quarterback Shaun Hill completing a 3-yard touchdown pass to wide receiver Isaac Bruce and a 48-yard touchdown pass to rookie wide receiver Josh Morgan.

With the season-sweep, the 49ers improved to 6–9. This was also the 1st time the 49ers swept the Rams since 2005.

==== Week 17: vs. Washington Redskins ====
Quarter	1	2	3	4	Total
Redskins	0	17	0	7	**24**
**49ers**	7	0	7	13	**27**

at Candlestick Park, San Francisco

- Game time: 1:15 pm PST
- Game weather: 55 °F (13 °C) (Cloudy)
- Game attendance: 67,519
- Referee: Pete Morelli
- TV announcers (Fox): Ron Pitts, Tony Boselli, & Charissa Thompson

Looking to keep the momentum from their last-minute victory against the Rams, the 49ers closed out their season at home in a Week 17 duel with the Washington Redskins. San Francisco struck first in the first quarter as quarterback Shaun Hill got a 2-yard touchdown run. Washington took the lead in the second quarter as running back Clinton Portis got a 4-yard touchdown run, kicker Shaun Suisham got a 41-yard field goal, and quarterback Jason Campbell completing a 6-yard touchdown pass to wide receiver Antwaan Randle El.

The 49ers began to rally in the third quarter as running back DeShaun Foster got a 1-yard touchdown run. In the fourth quarter, San Francisco took the lead as Hill completed a 9-yard touchdown pass to wide receiver Jason Hill, along with kicker Joe Nedney's 33-yard field goal. The Redskins tied the game as Campbell getting a 2-yard touchdown run, yet the Niners prevailed as Nedney nailed the game-winning 39-yard field goal.

They were 2–5 under Coach Mike Nolan at the beginning of the season, and finished their season 5–4 under interim coach Mike Singletary. With the strong finish to their season, the 49ers ended their season at 7–9, 2 games behind the division leading Arizona who finished 9–7.

San Francisco running back Frank Gore (11 carries for 58 yards) became the first player in franchise history to rush for over 1,000 yards in three consecutive seasons.

Shortly after the game ended, the 49ers announced that the 'interim' label had been removed from head coach Mike Singletary and that he would return next season. New 49ers team president Jed York reportedly signed Singletary to a 4-year deal worth approximately $10 million.

=== Standings ===
NFC West
	W	L	T	PCT	DIV	CONF	PF	PA	STK
^{(4)} Arizona Cardinals	9	7	0	.563	6–0	7–5	427	426	W1
San Francisco 49ers	7	9	0	.438	3–3	5–7	339	381	W2
Seattle Seahawks	4	12	0	.250	3–3	3–9	294	392	L1
St. Louis Rams	2	14	0	.125	0–6	2–10	232	465	L10
