= Walt Harris (cornerback) =

American football player (born 1974)

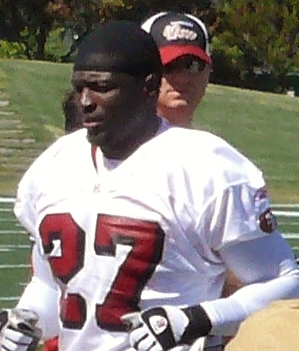
- Harris with the San Francisco 49ers in 2007

No. 27, 21
- Position: Cornerback

Personal information
- Born: August 10, 1974 (age 52); LaGrange, Georgia, U.S.
- Listed height: 5 ft 11 in (1.80 m)
- Listed weight: 192 lb (87 kg)

Career information
- High school: LaGrange
- College: Mississippi State
- NFL draft: 1996: 1st round, 13th overall pick

Career history
- Chicago Bears (1996–2001); Indianapolis Colts (2002–2003); Washington Redskins (2004–2005); San Francisco 49ers (2006–2009); Baltimore Ravens (2010)*
- * Offseason or practice squad member only

Awards and highlights
- Pro Bowl (2006); PFWA All-Rookie Team (1996); 2× First-team All-SEC (1994, 1995)

Career NFL statistics
- Total tackles: 755
- Sacks: 3.0
- Forced fumbles: 17
- Pass deflections: 129
- Interceptions: 35
- Defensive touchdowns: 4
- Stats at Pro Football Reference

Walter Lee Harris (born August 10, 1974) is an American former professional football player who was a cornerback for 13 seasons in the National Football League (NFL). He played college football for the Mississippi State Bulldogs and was selected by the Chicago Bears in the first round of the 1996 NFL draft with the 13th overall pick. He played for the Bears for six years and was then signed as a free agent by the Indianapolis Colts in 2002. He then signed with Washington Redskins in 2004. He signed with the San Francisco 49ers in 2006 where he earned his 1st trip to the Pro Bowl.

Harris signed with the 49ers in 2006, where he led the team with a career-high eight interceptions.

He was awarded NFC Defensive Player of the Month in November 2006. Harris was also selected to represent the National Football Conference (NFC) in the 2007 Pro Bowl, in place of injured Philadelphia Eagles cornerback Lito Sheppard.

Harris blocked an extra point in a 17-16 LaGrange High School victory against Colquitt County in the 1991 AAAA state championship game, a win that led LaGrange High School to be named national champion by USA Today.

== College career ==
Harris emerged as starter at Mississippi State University as a freshman at cornerback/free safety and played in ten games, including starts in the final three games. As a sophomore, he earned All-SEC (second-team) honors and started every game. That season, he tied the school seasonal record with six interceptions. Harris was an Associated Press and Coaches First-team All-SEC while starting every game at cornerback as junior. That season, he was ranked third in SEC and fifth in nation with six interceptions, led the team with 12 passes defensed, and recovered two fumbles and blocked two kicks. As a senior, he had four interceptions and eight passes defensed, played in the Senior Bowl, and was selected First-team All-SEC. Harris earned All-SEC honors in the final three seasons at Mississippi State. As a four-year letterman, he shares the Mississippi State career interception record with Johnthan Banks at 16.

In 2018, Harris and Art Davis were enshrined into Mississippi State football's "Ring of Honor" adding their names to the facade of Davis Wade Stadium. They joined former Bulldog greats Jack Cristil, Jackie Parker, Shorty McWilliams, D.D. Lewis, Kent Hull, Johnie Cooks, and Joe Fortunato.

== Professional career ==
=== Chicago Bears ===
The Chicago Bears selected Harris in the first round (13th overall) of the 1996 NFL draft. In order to secure the acquisition of Harris, the Bears opted to trade their first- (18th overall), third- (83rd overall), and sixth-round picks (201st overall) to the St. Louis Rams and received the first-round pick (13th overall) used to draft Harris in return.

On July 12, 1996, the Chicago Bears signed Harris to a five-year, $6.09 million rookie contract that included an initial signing bonus of $2.60 million. Entering training camp, Harris was slated to takeover as a starting cornerback following the departure of Jeremy Lincoln in free agency. Head coach Dave Wannstedt named Harris a starting cornerback to begin the regular season and paired him with Donnell Woolford.

On September 2, 1996, Harris made his professional regular season debut and earned his first career start in the Chicago Bears' home-opener against the Dallas Cowboys and made nine solo tackles, a forced fumble, and a fumble recovery during their 6–22 victory. In Week 3, he set a season-high with 13 combined tackles (11 solo) as the Bears lost 14–20 to the Minnesota Vikings. On September 22, 1996, Harris recorded five combined tackles (two solo) and made his first career interception on a pass Scott Mitchell threw to wide receiver Brett Perriman during a 16–35 loss at the Detroit Lions. He was inactive as the Bears defeated the Detroit Lions 31–14 in Week 13 due to a toe injury. He finished his rookie season with a total of 98 combined tackles (84 solo), forced three fumbles, made two fumble recoveries, and had two interceptions in 15 games and 13 starts.

He returned to training camp slated to retain his role as a starting cornerback under defensive coordinator Bob Slowik. Head coach Dave Wannstedt named Harris a starting cornerback to start the season, alongside free agent acquisition Tom Carter. On September 2, 1997, Harris set a season-high with 14 combined tackles (12 solo) and had his first interception of the season on a pass attempt by Brad Johnson to wide receiver Cris Carter as the Bears lost 27–24. On December 14, 1997, Harris made one solo tackle and set a career-high with two interceptions thrown by Tony Banks during a 13–10 victory at the St. Louis Rams. He started all 16 games throughout the 1997 NFL season for the first time in his career and finished with a total of 83 combined tackles (76 solo), five interceptions, four forced fumbles, and a fumble recovery.

He returned alongside Tom Carter as the starting cornerbacks to begin the 1998 NFL season. On September 6, 1998, Harris started in the Chicago Bears' home-opener against the Jacksonville Jaguars and set a season-high with eight solo tackles as they lost 23–24. On December 13, 1998, Harris made four solo tackles, one pass deflection, and scored the first touchdown of his career following a pick-six during a 20–26 loss at the Green Bay Packers. His pick-six occurred after he intercepted a pass Brett Favre attempted to throw to wide receiver Antonio Freeman and returned it for a 13-yard touchdown in the third quarter.

In 1999, his fourth for the Bears, Harris made 71 tackles and one interception. The 2000 season saw Harris make 58 tackles and two interceptions. In 2001, his last for the Chicago Bears, Harris made 50 tackles and one interception.

On April 26, 2001, the Chicago Bears re-signed Harris to a one-year, $1.50 million contract that included a signing bonus of $1 million. The contract includes incentives that reach a maximum value of $2 million. During free agency, Harris met with the Cincinnati Bengals and was reportedly offered a four-year, $10 million contract.

=== Indianapolis Colts ===
Harris was signed by the Indianapolis Colts on March 18, 2002, as an unrestricted free agent. In his first season with the Colts he started 15 games and made 43 tackles and two interceptions. In his final year for the Colts, Harris made 55 tackles.

=== Washington Redskins ===
Harris was signed by the Washington Redskins as a free agent on March 18, 2004. In his first season with the Redskins, he played in 16 games recording 21 tackles and two interceptions. In 2005, his final year for the Redskins Harris finished the season with 57 tackles and one interception.

=== San Francisco 49ers ===
Harris was signed by the San Francisco 49ers as a free agent on March 15, 2006. In his debut season with the 49ers, he made 60 tackles, one sack, a career-high eight interceptions, and a 42-yard interception for a touchdown. That earned him his first trip to the Pro Bowl.

In the 2008 season, he recorded 49 tackles, one sack, and three interceptions (as of December 7, 2008). Harris missed the entire 2009 football season after tearing his ACL in 49er organized team activities (OTAs).

=== NFL statistics ===
Year	Team	Games	Combined tackles	Tackles	Assisted tackles	Sacks	Forced fumbles	Fumble recoveries	Fumble return yards	Interceptions	Interception return yards	Yards per interception return	Longest interception return	Interceptions returned for touchdown	Passes defended
1996	CHI	15	95	81	14	0.0	3	2	0	2	0	0	0	0	9
1997	CHI	16	80	72	8	0.0	4	1	0	5	30	6	12	0	16
1998	CHI	14	68	63	5	0.0	1	1	0	4	41	10	26	1	16
1999	CHI	15	69	60	9	1.0	0	1	0	1	-1	-1	-1	0	13
2000	CHI	12	40	31	9	0.0	1	0	0	2	35	18	35	1	13
2001	CHI	15	50	48	2	0.0	1	2	0	1	45	45	39	1	9
2002	IND	15	43	34	9	0.0	1	2	0	2	0	0	0	0	17
2003	IND	16	54	35	19	0.0	1	1	0	0	0	0	0	0	12
2004	WSH	16	17	15	2	0.0	1	0	0	2	31	16	31	0	5
2005	WSH	13	57	49	8	0.0	0	0	0	1	0	0	0	0	10
2006	SF	15	63	52	11	1.0	4	2	0	8	84	11	42	1	20
2007	SF	15	58	47	11	0.0	1	0	0	4	42	11	23	0	13
2008	SF	16	54	44	10	1.0	0	0	0	3	25	8	24	0	13
Career		193	748	631	117	3.0	18	12	0	35	332	9	42	4	166

== Personal life ==
Harris attended LaGrange High School and was All-America honorable mention by USA Today. His team compiled a 34–6 record in his final three years. He also was a track hurdler. He teamed with Thomas Smith to organize ticket donation program called "Corner to Corner" in first season with the Bears that provides tickets for each home game to the Boys and Girls Clubs of Chicago. The program included an on-field visit before each game and visits by Harris and Smith to clubs throughout the season. He partnered with fellow members of Bears secondary and Meals on Wheels in 2000 to "Intercept Hunger" with meal donations being made based on participating players’ performances each game. Harris and his wife, Trina, have four children: Courtney, London, Summer and Brandon.
