= Kentwan Balmer =

American football player and coach (born 1986)

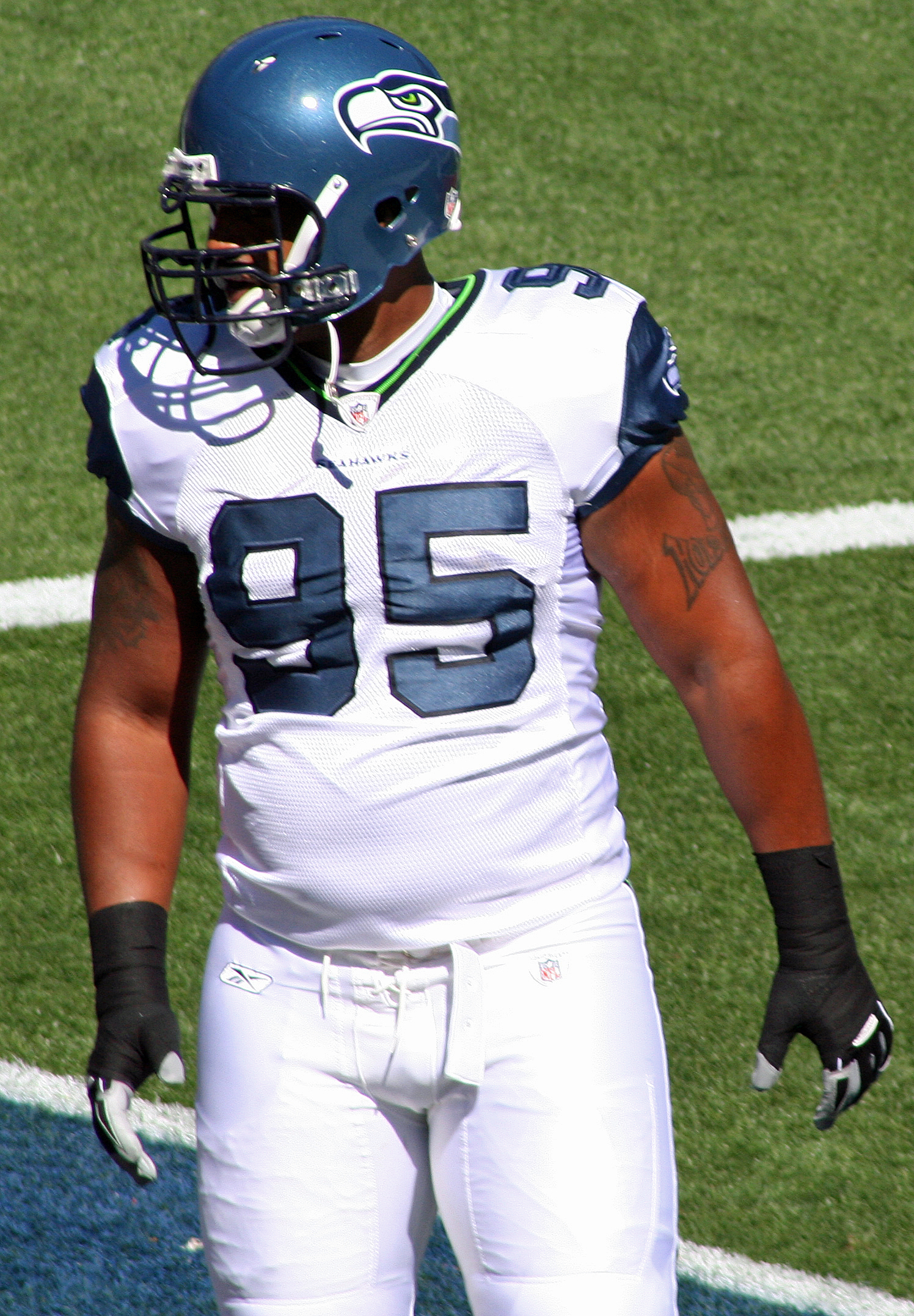
- Balmer with the Seattle Seahawks in 2010

Chicago State Cougars
- Title: Defensive line coach

Personal information
- Born: October 15, 1986 (age 40); Ahoskie, North Carolina, U.S.
- Listed height: 6 ft 5 in (1.96 m)
- Listed weight: 317 lb (144 kg)

Career information
- High school: Weldon (NC)
- College: North Carolina (2004–2007)
- NFL draft: 2008: 1st round, 29th overall pick

Career history

Playing
- San Francisco 49ers (2008–2009); Seattle Seahawks (2010); Carolina Panthers (2011)*; Washington Redskins (2011)
- * Offseason or practice squad member only

Coaching
- Shaw University (2015) Special teams coordinator & assistant defensive line coach; Kipp High School (2016) Assistant head coach/defensive coordinator/defensive line coach; Virginia University of Lynchburg (2017–2018) Assistant head coach & defensive coordinator; Samford (2019) Defensive anaylist & assistant defensive line coach; Alabama A&M (2020–2021) Defensive ends coach; Hampton (2021–2025) Defensive line coach; Chicago State (2026–present) Defensive line coach

Awards and highlights
- Second-team All-ACC (2007)

Career NFL statistics
- Total tackles: 62
- Stats at Pro Football Reference

Kentwan Balmer (born October 15, 1986) is an American football coach and former player who is a defensive line coach for the Chicago State Cougars. He played professionally as a defensive end in the National Football League (NFL). Balmer played college football for the North Carolina Tar Heels before being selected by the San Francisco 49ers in the first round of the 2008 NFL draft with the 29th overall pick. He was also a member of the Seattle Seahawks, Carolina Panthers, and Washington Redskins.

== College career ==
Balmer started all twelve games at right defensive tackle as a senior, ranking second on the team with 59 tackles (33 solos), including 3.5 sacks for minus 26 yards, 9.5 stops for losses of 44 yards and twenty four quarterback pressures. In 2005, he played 11 games with three starts and 17 tackles (5 for a loss) and one sack. As a freshman, he played in nine games and made one tackle.

== Professional career ==
Pre-draft measurables
Height	Weight	40-yard dash	10-yard split	20-yard split	20-yard shuttle	Three-cone drill	Vertical jump	Broad jump	Bench press
6 ft 4 1/2 in (1.94 m)	308 lb (140 kg)	5.11 s	1.80 s	2.99 s	4.82 s	7.65 s	29 in (0.74 m)	8 ft 7 in (2.62 m)	33 reps
40-yard dash (and splits) and vertical from UNC Pro Day; others from NFL Combine

=== San Francisco 49ers ===
Balmer was selected in the first round of the 2008 NFL draft, 29th overall. He was originally drafted as a DT but was moved to DE due to the Niners 3-4 defensive scheme.

On December 9, 2009, Balmer was placed on injured reserve with a shoulder injury. The 49ers later signed Baraka Atkins to take over his position.

=== Seattle Seahawks ===
Balmer was traded to the Seattle Seahawks on August 16, 2010 in exchange for a sixth round pick in a future NFL Draft. He was waived on August 24, 2011.

=== Carolina Panthers ===
On August 25, Balmer was claimed off waivers by the Carolina Panthers. However, he was waived on September 1.

=== Washington Redskins ===
Balmer signed with the Washington Redskins on November 8, 2011. On August 2, 2012, it was reported that he did not show up to training camp two days in a row and his agent has not replied to any inquiries as to Balmer's whereabouts. It was assumed that, Balmer left the team after Redskins officials checked his hotel room and saw that all of Balmer's personal effects were gone. Head coach Mike Shanahan announced that the team had finally made contact with Balmer on August 11, but did not explain the reason for his disappearance or his future with the Redskins.

Nearly two years after he walked away from the team, the Redskins officially terminated his contract on May 30, 2014.

=== NFL statistics ===
Year	Team	GP	COMB	TOTAL	AST	SACK	FF	FR	FR YDS	INT	IR YDS	AVG IR	LNG	TD	PD
2008	SF	16	7	6	1	0.0	0	0	0	0	0	0	0	0	1
2009	SF	11	12	5	7	0.0	0	0	0	0	0	0	0	0	0
2010	SEA	16	43	28	15	0.0	0	0	0	0	0	0	0	0	1
Career		43	62	39	23	0.0	0	0	0	0	0	0	0	0	2
