= Ronald Fields =

American football player (born 1981)

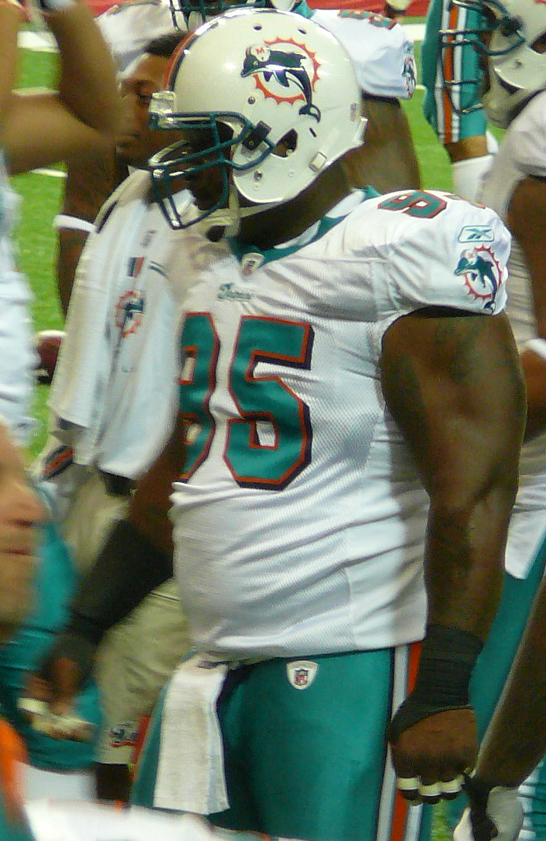
- Fields with the Miami Dolphins in 2011

No. 91, 93, 95
- Position: Nose tackle

Personal information
- Born: September 13, 1981 (age 45); Bogalusa, Louisiana, U.S.
- Listed height: 6 ft 2 in (1.88 m)
- Listed weight: 314 lb (142 kg)

Career information
- High school: Bogalusa
- College: Mississippi State
- NFL draft: 2005: 5th round, 137th overall pick

Career history
- San Francisco 49ers (2005–2008); Denver Broncos (2009–2010); Miami Dolphins (2011)*; Carolina Panthers (2011)
- * Offseason or practice squad member only

Awards and highlights
- First-team All-SEC (2004)

Career NFL statistics
- Total tackles: 154
- Sacks: 1
- Forced fumbles: 1
- Stats at Pro Football Reference

Ronald Fields (born September 13, 1981) is an American former professional football player who was a nose tackle in the National Football League (NFL). He played college football for the Mississippi State Bulldogs and was selected by the San Francisco 49ers in the fifth round of the 2005 NFL draft.

He was also a member of the Denver Broncos, Miami Dolphins, and Carolina Panthers.

== College career ==
Fields attended Mississippi State University, where he played nose guard, won first-team All-SEC accolades, and finished his career with one sack, 172 tackles (16.5 for losses), six quarterback hurries, one forced fumble, and two fumble recoveries. He majored in teaching and coaching.

== Professional career ==
=== San Francisco 49ers ===
Fields was selected by the San Francisco 49ers in the fifth round (137th overall) in the 2005 NFL draft. In his rookie season he played in four games recording seven tackles. He made his NFL debut versus the Seattle Seahawks on November 20. In 2006, he played in 13 games and finished the campaign with a career high 28 tackles. He also started his first game versus the San Diego Chargers. In 2007, he recorded 21 tackles as well as his first career sack against the Arizona Cardinals.

=== Denver Broncos ===
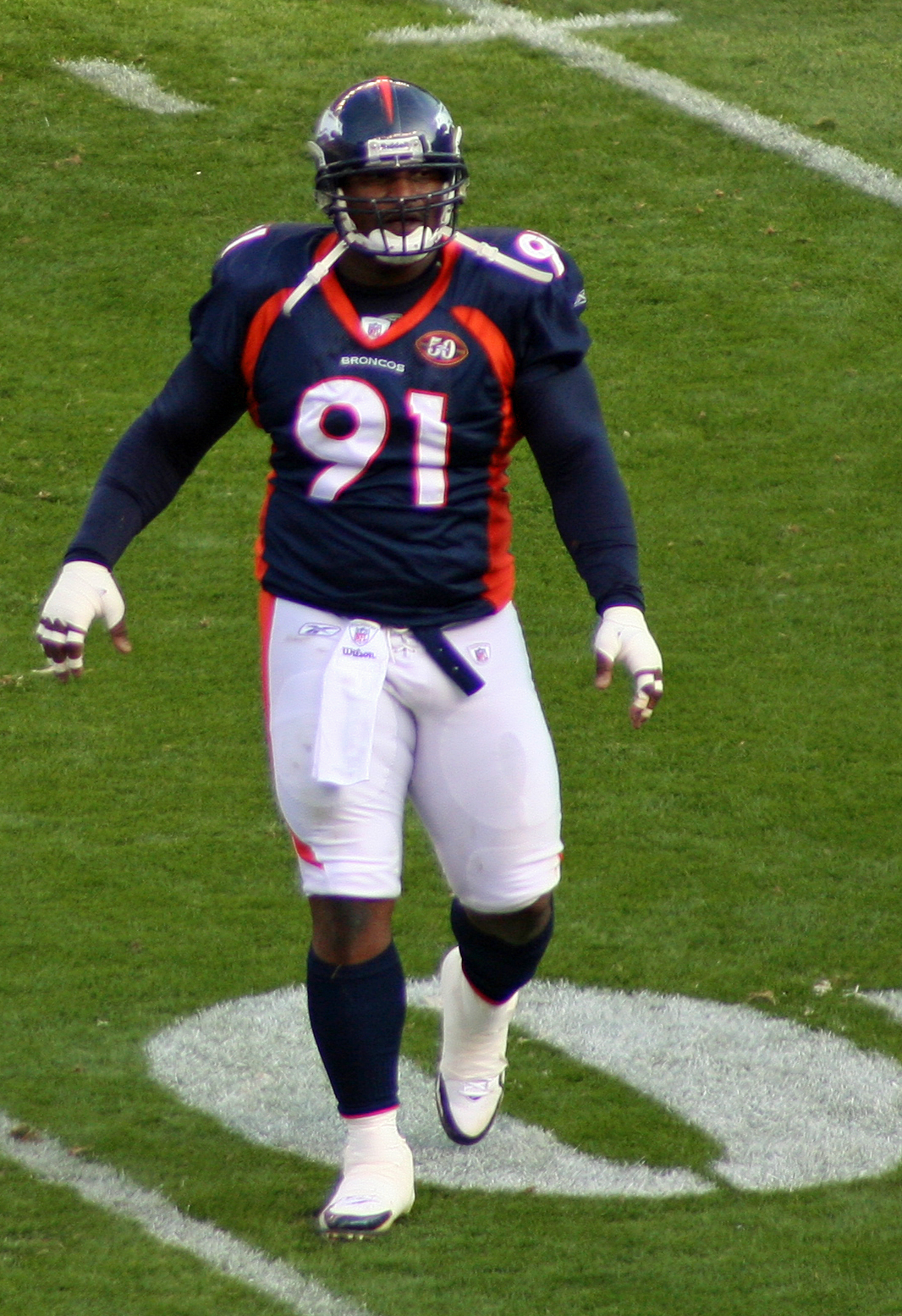
Fields during his stint with the Broncos.

On March 2, 2009, Fields signed a two-year contract with the Denver Broncos. He was their starting nose tackle for the year 2009. However, he was succeeded by another player the following year.

=== Miami Dolphins ===
Fields signed with the Miami Dolphins on July 31, 2011, but was released on September 3.

=== Carolina Panthers ===
Fields signed with the Carolina Panthers on September 13, 2011. He was waived on November 8.

== NFL career statistics ==
Legend
**Bold**	Career high

Year	Team	Games		Tackles					Interceptions					Fumbles			
Year	Team	GP	GS	Cmb	Solo	Ast	Sck	TFL	Int	Yds	TD	Lng	PD	FF	FR	Yds	TD
2005	SFO	4	0	7	4	3	0.0	2	0	0	0	0	0	0	0	0	0
2006	SFO	13	9	28	20	8	0.0	**3**	0	0	0	0	**1**	0	0	0	0
2007	SFO	**16**	0	34	**23**	11	**1.0**	0	0	0	0	0	0	**1**	0	0	0
2008	SFO	**16**	0	19	13	6	0.0	0	0	0	0	0	0	0	0	0	0
2009	DEN	**16**	**16**	**37**	22	**15**	0.0	1	0	0	0	0	0	0	0	0	0
2010	DEN	**16**	0	22	14	8	0.0	1	0	0	0	0	0	0	0	0	0
2011	CAR	6	0	7	6	1	0.0	0	0	0	0	0	0	0	0	0	0
Career		87	25	154	102	52	1.0	7	0	0	0	0	1	1	0	0	0

== Personal life ==
Fields is a cousin of defensive tackle Kenderick Allen.
