= Parys Haralson =

American football player (1984–2021)

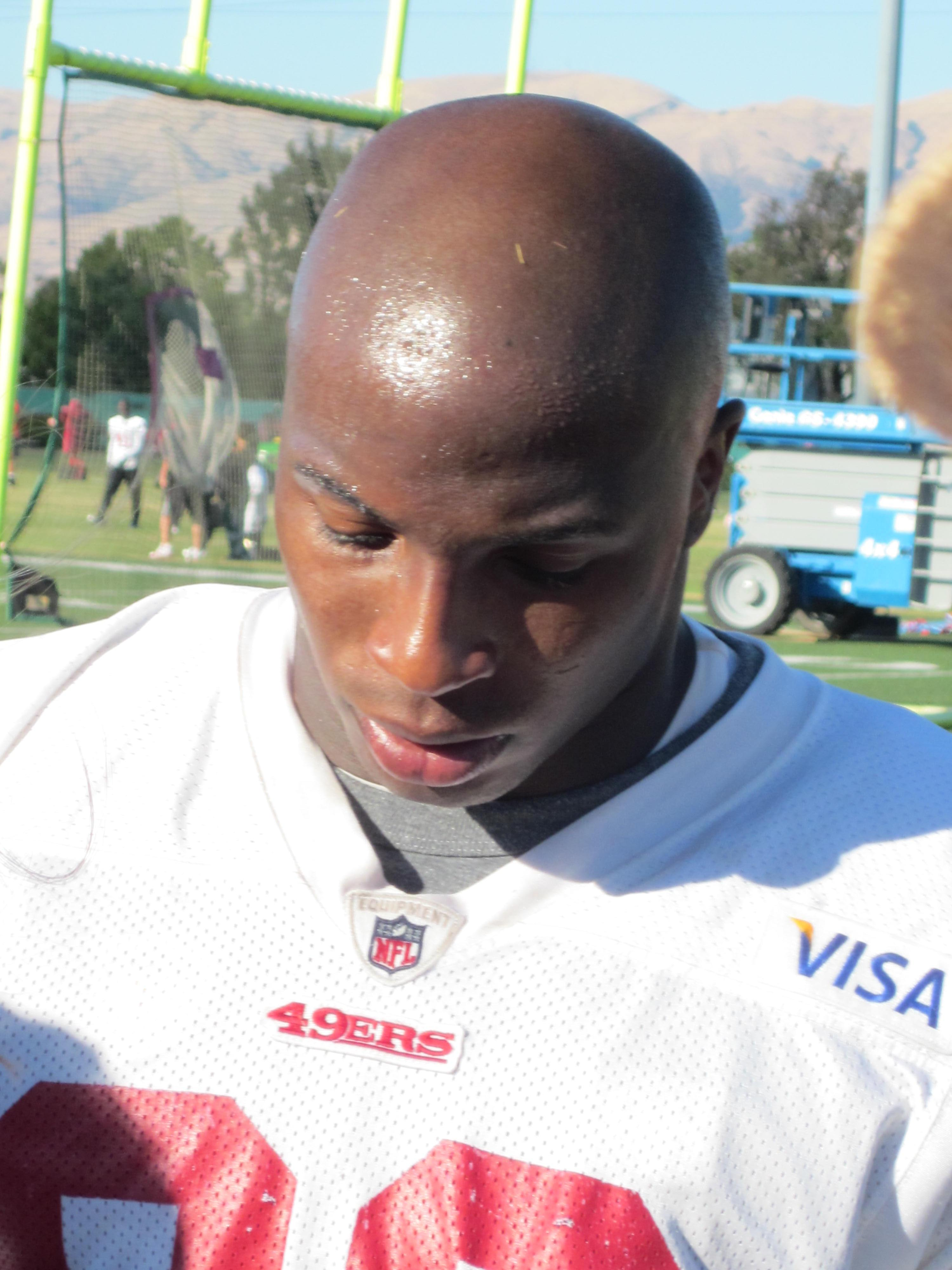
- Haralson with the San Francisco 49ers in 2010

No. 98
- Position: Linebacker

Personal information
- Born: January 24, 1984; Flora, Mississippi, U.S.
- Died: September 13, 2021 (aged 37); San Jose, California, U.S.
- Listed height: 6 ft 0 in (1.83 m)
- Listed weight: 255 lb (116 kg)

Career information
- High school: Madison Central (Madison, Mississippi)
- College: Tennessee
- NFL draft: 2006: 5th round, 140th overall pick

Career history

Playing
- San Francisco 49ers (2006–2012); New Orleans Saints (2013–2014)

Operations
- San Francisco 49ers (2016–2018) Director of player engagement

Awards and highlights
- 2× Second-team All-SEC (2004, 2005)

Career NFL statistics
- Total tackles: 275
- Sacks: 28
- Forced fumbles: 3
- Fumble recoveries: 5
- Stats at Pro Football Reference

Parys Sharron Haralson (January 24, 1984 – September 13, 2021) was an American professional football player who was a linebacker in the National Football League (NFL). He was selected by the San Francisco 49ers in the fifth round of the 2006 NFL draft. He played college football for the Tennessee Volunteers as a defensive end.

== Early life ==
Haralson attended and played high school football at Madison Central High School in Madison, Mississippi. He was an All-American selection by Borderwars.com, Super Prep, Max Emfinger and Prep Star as a senior. He was a member of the Jackson Clarion-Ledger's Dandy Dozen prospects in Mississippi. He was a two-time Class 5A All-State and three-time All-Metro choice. He helped Madison Central to the state title as sophomore with a 15–0 record, while his junior (9–2) and senior (10–3) teams also advanced to the playoffs. He recorded 148 tackles, 10 sacks and one interception as a senior. As a junior, Haralson posted 80 tackles, 12 sacks and two interceptions.

== College career ==
At the University of Tennessee in 2002, he played in thirteen games for the Volunteers as a reserve defensive end. He came up with 25 tackles (14 solos), a 15-yard sack and two stops for losses of 20 yards. He also had a quarterback pressure. He was a Freshman All-SEC pick by the Knoxville News Sentinel. He earned SEC Freshman Academic Honor Roll recognition.

In 2003, he moved into the starting lineup at left defensive end during the season's fourth game against South Carolina. He finished with 44 tackles (30 solos). He tied for the team lead with 4.5 sacks and had 14.5 stops for losses of 62 yards. He recovered a fumble and made ten quarterback pressures. He also deflected a pass.

In 2004, he started twelve games at left defensive end, coming off the bench against Georgia. He was the team captain and an All-SEC second-team choice. He recorded 43 tackles (34 solos) and ranked second in the conference with seven sacks and 13.5 stops for losses of 53 yards. He tied the school season-record with 21 quarterback pressures. He caused and recovered two fumbles, returning one 18 yards for a touchdown.

In 2005, Haralson started all year at left defensive end and finished the year as an All-SEC second-team selection. He recorded 45 tackles (33 solos). He led the team and ranked fourth in the conference with 8.5 sacks. He finished third in the SEC with 16.5 stops for losses of 78 yards, the eighth-best season total in school history. He was credited with twelve quarterback pressures. He recovered two fumbles, returning one 17 yards. He had three forced fumbles and deflected a pass.

Haralson majored in sociology at Tennessee.

== Professional career ==
Pre-draft measurables
Height	Weight	Arm length	Hand span	40-yard dash	10-yard split	20-yard split	20-yard shuttle	Three-cone drill	Vertical jump	Broad jump	Bench press
6 ft 1 1/4 in (1.86 m)	253 lb (115 kg)	33 1/4 in (0.84 m)	10 in (0.25 m)	4.82 s	1.64 s	2.84 s	4.26 s	7.37 s	32.0 in (0.81 m)	9 ft 7 in (2.92 m)	24 reps
All values from NFL Combine

=== San Francisco 49ers ===
Haralson was selected by the San Francisco 49ers in the fifth round (140th overall) in the 2006 NFL draft. In his rookie season, he played in seven games, recording four tackles. He made his NFL debut versus the St. Louis Rams on September 17, 2006. In 2007, Haralson started 11 games from 16 appearances and made 42 tackles and 2.5 sacks, his first solo sack coming at the Seattle Seahawks on November 12. He finished the 2008 season leading the 49ers with eight sacks. Haralson led the NFC West in sacks in 2008.

In April 2009, Haralson signed a four-year contract extension with the 49ers. In the 2009 season, he had five sacks, 45 total tackles, and two passes defended, and one fumble recovery. In the 2010 season, he had four sacks, 42 total tackles, and two fumble recoveries. In the 2011 season, he had two sacks, 31 total tackles, and three forced fumbles. He missed the entire 2012 season with an arm injury.

=== New Orleans Saints ===
On August 26, 2013, Haralson was traded from the 49ers to the New Orleans Saints. He had 30 tackles and 3½ sacks during the 2013 season. He was injured in the Saints' first playoff game and was unable to play in their second one.

In the opening game of the 2014 season, in addition to his usual defensive role, Haralson came in for two plays at fullback, serving as a lead blocker for Khiry Robinson, who scored a touchdown behind Haralson's block in the second quarter. It was Haralson's first time to play offense in his entire football career. In the 2014 season, he had three sacks, 35 total tackles, and one fumble recovery.

== NFL career statistics ==
Legend
**Bold**	Career high

=== Regular season ===
Year	Team	Games		Tackles					Interceptions					Fumbles			
Year	Team	GP	GS	Cmb	Solo	Ast	Sck	TFL	Int	Yds	TD	Lng	PD	FF	FR	Yds	TD
2006	SFO	7	0	4	4	0	0.0	0	0	0	0	0	0	0	0	0	0
2007	SFO	**16**	11	**49**	32	**17**	2.5	7	0	0	0	0	0	0	0	0	0
2008	SFO	**16**	10	39	28	11	**8.0**	10	0	0	0	0	**2**	0	1	0	0
2009	SFO	**16**	**16**	45	**33**	12	5.0	**12**	0	0	0	0	**2**	0	1	0	0
2010	SFO	15	15	42	29	13	4.0	7	0	0	0	0	0	0	**2**	0	0
2011	SFO	**16**	**16**	31	25	6	2.0	2	0	0	0	0	0	**3**	0	0	0
2013	NOR	**16**	8	30	16	14	3.5	5	0	0	0	0	1	0	0	0	0
2014	NOR	**16**	12	35	23	12	3.0	6	0	0	0	0	0	0	1	0	0
Career		118	88	275	190	85	28.0	49	0	0	0	0	5	3	5	0	0

=== Playoffs ===
Year	Team	Games		Tackles					Interceptions					Fumbles			
Year	Team	GP	GS	Cmb	Solo	Ast	Sck	TFL	Int	Yds	TD	Lng	PD	FF	FR	Yds	TD
2011	SFO	**2**	**2**	**4**	**3**	**1**	0.0	0	0	0	0	0	**1**	0	0	0	0
2013	NOR	1	0	1	1	0	0.0	0	0	0	0	0	0	0	0	0	0
Career		3	2	5	4	1	0.0	0	0	0	0	0	1	0	0	0	0

== Death ==
Haralson died on September 13, 2021. At the time of his death, Parys worked in sales for a San Francisco-based startup. In March 2022, it was revealed that the Santa Clara County Medical Examiner-Coroner's Office determined Haralson died of a stroke caused by a "rupture of (a) cerebrovascular malformation".
