= Kenderick Allen =

American football player (born 1978)

No. 99, 97
- Position: Defensive tackle

Personal information
- Born: September 14, 1978 (age 48); Bogalusa, Louisiana, U.S.
- Listed height: 6 ft 5 in (1.96 m)
- Listed weight: 330 lb (150 kg)

Career information
- High school: Bogalusa
- College: LSU
- NFL draft: 2003: undrafted

Career history
- New Orleans Saints (2003); New York Giants (2004–2005); Green Bay Packers (2006); Cincinnati Bengals (2007)*; Minnesota Vikings (2008)
- * Offseason or practice squad member only

Career NFL statistics
- Total tackles: 54
- Sacks: 3
- Fumble recoveries: 2
- Stats at Pro Football Reference

Kenderick Allen (born September 14, 1978) is an American former professional football player who was a defensive tackle in the National Football League (NFL) from 2003 through 2006. He was signed by the New Orleans Saints as an undrafted free agent in 2003. He was also a member of the New York Giants, Green Bay Packers, Cincinnati Bengals and Minnesota Vikings. Allen played college football for the LSU Tigers.

== Professional career ==
=== New Orleans Saints ===
Allen started his career with the New Orleans Saints in 2003. He was released on August 31, 2003.

=== New York Giants ===
He then signed with the New York Giants.

=== Green Bay Packers ===
On April 26, 2006, he signed with the Packers. On October 4, 2006, the Packers placed him on injured reserve, ending his 2006 season.

=== Cincinnati Bengals ===
On May 11, 2007, Allen signed with the Cincinnati Bengals, his fourth team in five years, but he did not make the team and was released on September 1, 2007.

=== Minnesota Vikings ===
On March 20, 2008, he signed with the Minnesota Vikings but did not play for them.

== Personal ==
Allen is a cousin of former defensive lineman Ronald Fields.
