= Hannibal Navies =

American football player (born 1977)

No. 53, 50, 57, 55
- Position: Linebacker

Personal information
- Born: July 19, 1977 (age 49); Oakland, California, U.S.
- Listed height: 6 ft 3 in (1.91 m)
- Listed weight: 245 lb (111 kg)

Career information
- College: Colorado
- NFL draft: 1999: 4th round, 100th overall pick

Career history
- Carolina Panthers (1999–2002); Green Bay Packers (2003–2004); Cincinnati Bengals (2005); San Francisco 49ers (2006–2007)

Awards and highlights
- Second-team All-Big 12 (1997)

Career NFL statistics
- Tackles: 244
- Sacks: 4.5
- Interceptions: 1
- Stats at Pro Football Reference

Hannibal Navies (born July 19, 1977) is an American former professional football player who was a linebacker in the National Football League (NFL). Navies was a third-team All Big 12 selection playing college football for the Colorado Buffaloes and earned the team's defensive player of the year award after starting every game at linebacker. He was selected in the 1999 NFL draft by the Carolina Panthers, then played for the Green Bay Packers. In 2005, he signed with the Cincinnati Bengals where he started 15 games. Navies was cut in training camp a year later. He was signed by the San Francisco 49ers on November 22, 2006, but was cut to make room for Zak Keasey in 2007.

Navies is an alumnus of Berkeley High School in Berkeley, California, and runs a football camp called 360 Football Academy that prepares students to become collegiate scholar athletes.
