= Melvin Oliver (American football) =

American football player (born 1983)

No. 96
- Position: Defensive end

Personal information
- Born: July 25, 1983 (age 43); Opelika, Alabama, U.S.
- Listed height: 6 ft 3 in (1.91 m)
- Listed weight: 274 lb (124 kg)

Career information
- High school: Opelika
- College: LSU
- NFL draft: 2006: 6th round, 197th overall pick

Career history
- San Francisco 49ers (2006–2007)

Awards and highlights
- BCS national champion (2003); Sporting News Freshman All-SEC (2002)

Career NFL statistics
- Total tackles: 43
- Sacks: 1
- Fumble recoveries: 1
- Stats at Pro Football Reference

Melvin Deontae Oliver (born July 25, 1983) is an American former professional football player who was a defensive end for one season with the San Francisco 49ers of the National Football League (NFL). He played college football for the LSU Tigers and was selected by the 49ers in the sixth round of the 2006 NFL draft with the 197th overall pick. In Week 5 of the 2006 season, he scored a touchdown on a 12-yard defensive fumble return against the Oakland Raiders.

Pre-draft measurables
Height	Weight	Arm length	Hand span
6 ft 2 3/4 in (1.90 m)	276 lb (125 kg)	32 5/8 in (0.83 m)	9 3/4 in (0.25 m)
All values from NFL Combine
