= Vickiel Vaughn =

American football player (born 1983)

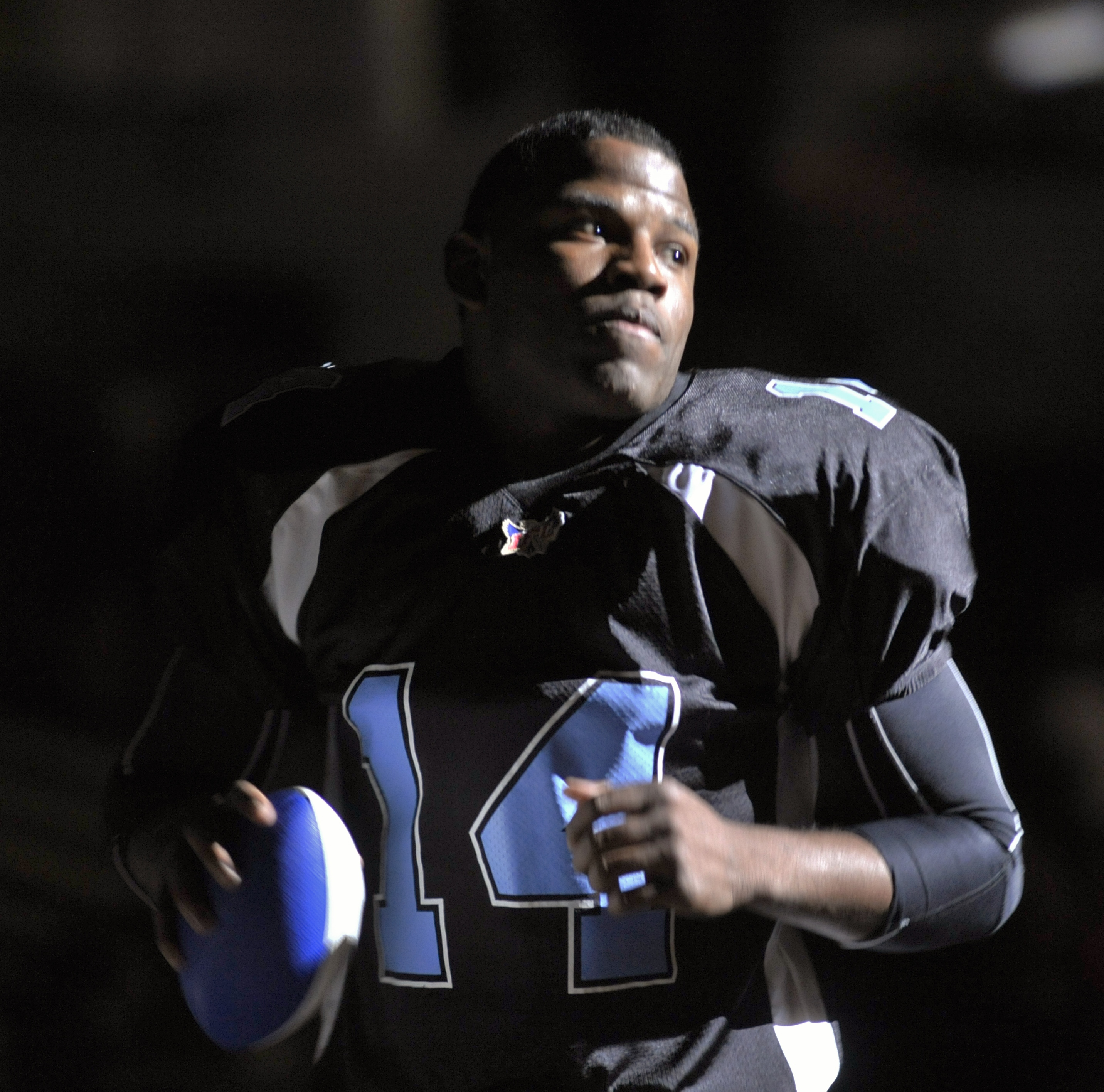
- Vaughn with the Arkansas Diamonds in 2010

Profile
- Position: Safety

Personal information
- Born: October 24, 1983 (age 43); Little Rock, Arkansas, U.S.
- Listed height: 6 ft 1 in (1.85 m)
- Listed weight: 204 lb (93 kg)

Career information
- High school: Plano (TX) West
- College: Arkansas
- NFL draft: 2006: 7th round, 254th overall pick

Career history
- San Francisco 49ers (2006); → Berlin Thunder (2007); Denver Broncos (2008)*; Dallas Cowboys (2008)*; Arkansas Diamonds (2010)
- * Offseason or practice squad member only

Vickiel Vaughn (born October 24, 1983) is an American former professional football safety. He was selected by the San Francisco 49ers in the seventh round of the 2006 NFL draft. He played college football at Arkansas.

== Early life ==
Vaughn attended Plano West Senior High School in Plano, Texas. Rated as one of the nation's top 25 football players by The Sporting News and one of the top 125 by USA Today, Vaughn caught 25 passes for 414 yards and five touchdowns in his senior year as a wide receiver. That same season as a defensive back, Vaughn made 67 tackles and six interceptions. Rivals100.com ranked Vaughn second among all high school safeties. Vaughn participated in the 2002 U.S. Army All-American Bowl Game in San Antonio, Texas.

== College career ==
Vaughn played college football for the University of Arkansas Razorbacks from 2002 to 2005, all under head coach Houston Nutt. Vaughn appeared in all 14 games for Arkansas as a true freshman in 2002. Primarily, Vaughn played on punt returns and kickoff coverage. He made three tackles throughout the course of the season, including two in special teams action. He had one solo stop against Minnesota in the 2002 Music City Bowl.

As a sophomore in 2003, after spending his first season as a free safety, he moved to linebacker position in fall camp. He played in all 13 games and played mostly on special teams early in the season. Vaughn was second on the team with 10 special teams tackles and had 23 overall tackles, one interception, and two forced fumbles this season. Vaughn made two big plays on a South Carolina fourth-quarter drive to keep the Gamecocks out of the end zone. On third down, he made a touchdown-saving pass deflection near the Arkansas goal line. Then on fourth down, he forced a fumble that was recovered by Arkansas. Arkansas also won the 2003 Independence Bowl later that year.

As a junior in 2004, he played in 11 games with 10 starts. He started the first seven of eight contests at free safety then started the final three contests at strong safety. He led the Razorbacks with 66 tackles, including 47 solo stops. He also had two interceptions, three pass deflections, one forced fumble and one fumble recovery. Against Auburn, Vaughn had nine tackles, including seven solo stops, a fumble recovery and an interception against the Tigers.

As a senior in 2005, Vaughn finished second on the team with 83 tackles. He had four interceptions, returning one for a touchdown and recovered one fumble.

== Professional career ==
Pre-draft measurables
Height	Weight	40-yard dash	20-yard shuttle	Three-cone drill	Vertical jump	Broad jump	Bench press
5 ft 11 5/8 in (1.82 m)	208 lb (94 kg)	4.63 s	4.09 s	6.65 s	31.5 in (0.80 m)	9 ft 5 in (2.87 m)	13 reps
All values from Pro Day

In the 2006 NFL draft, the San Francisco 49ers selected Vaughn in the seventh round as the 254th overall pick. The 49ers placed Vaughn on injured reserve on September 2, 2006, the day after Vaughn injured his finger in the 49ers' final preseason game. After the season, the 49ers allocated Vaughn to the NFL Europe's Berlin Thunder.

On December 31, 2007, the Denver Broncos signed Vaughn to a reserve/futures contract. The Broncos waived Vaughn on June 13, 2008. On August 1, the Broncos replaced safety John Lynch with Vaughn, then waived Vaughn on August 30. He signed with the Dallas Cowboys practice squad on December 9, 2008.

In 2010, Vaughn made his professional debut with the Indoor Football League (IFL)'s Arkansas Diamonds. Vaughn played in 8 regular season games and had 28 tackles, 2 interceptions (1 returned for a touchdown), and 5 passes defended. In the IFL's Intense Conference, Arkansas finished 11-3 and first in the Lonestar East division. Vaughn played in three playoff games and had 11 tackles, 1 interception, and 2 passes defended. Arkansas advanced to the IFL semifinals and lost to the Billings Outlaws 53–42 on July 10, 2010.

Vaughn returned to the University of Arkansas at Fayetteville to finish his bachelor's degree in criminal justice. He graduated in 2012 and worked for Williams Sonoma for a year after graduating.
