= Marcus Hudson =

American football player (born 1982)

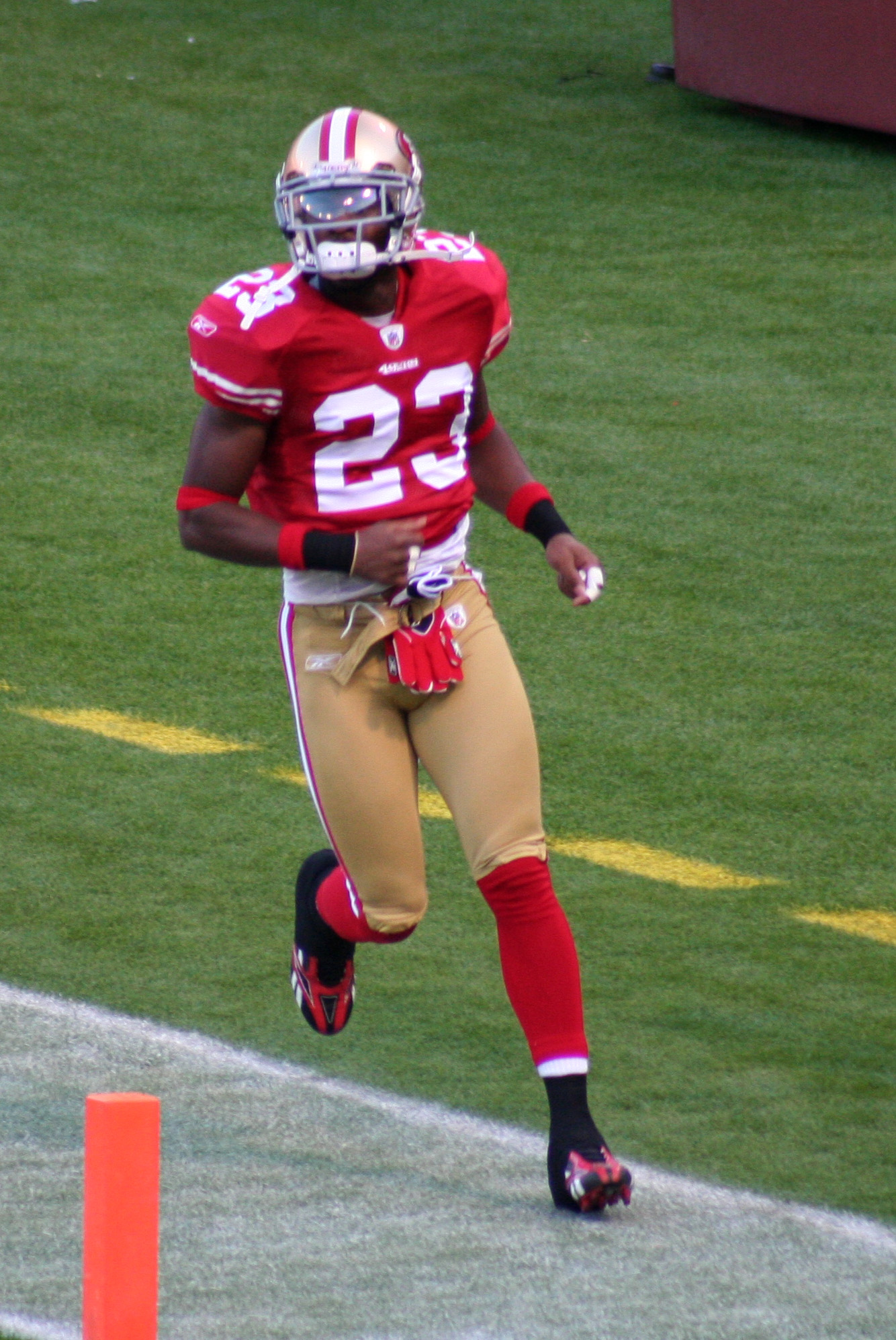
- Hudson with the San Francisco 49ers in 2009

No. 23, 25
- Position: Cornerback

Personal information
- Born: November 15, 1982 (age 44); Miami, Florida, U.S.
- Listed height: 6 ft 2 in (1.88 m)
- Listed weight: 200 lb (91 kg)

Career information
- High school: Homestead (FL) South Dade
- College: NC State
- NFL draft: 2006: 6th round, 192nd overall pick

Career history
- San Francisco 49ers (2006–2009); Carolina Panthers (2010)

Career NFL statistics
- Total tackles: 89
- Forced fumbles: 1
- Fumble recoveries: 3
- Pass deflections: 5
- Stats at Pro Football Reference

Marcus Hudson (born November 15, 1982) is an American former professional football player who was a defensive back in the National Football League (NFL). He was selected by the San Francisco 49ers in the sixth round of the 2006 NFL draft. He played college football for the NC State Wolfpack.

== Early life ==
Hudson attended South Dade High School. He recorded 75 tackles and five interceptions as a senior. He returned a fumble and an interception for touchdowns. He returned a kickoff and a punt for a touchdown. He earned all-state accolades. He was voted a usatoday.com and a Max Emfinger All-American. High school teammate of Arizona Cardinals cornerback Antrel Rolle.

== College career ==
In 2005, Hudson finished season with 58 tackles, 11 passes defensed and two interceptions. He had at least one pass defensed in nine of 12 games during the season. He had two interceptions against Maryland, returning one for a touchdown. He had seven tackles and one pass defensed against Clemson. He had nine tackles and blocked a kick against South Florida.

In 2004, Hudson a hard-hitting defender, who finished the season ranked tied for fifth on the team in tackles while playing at free safety. He led the team in tackles with nine at North Carolina and had a career-high 15 in the win at Maryland. He was named the ACC Defensive Back of the Week for his performance against Maryland. He was the only defender to score two touchdowns that season, he returned an interception 60 yards for a touchdown against Georgia Tech and scored a touchdown when he recovered a blocked punt in the season opener with Richmond. He broke up six passes last season, three in the game against third-ranked Miami. He led the team with two caused fumbles, one against Virginia Tech and one versus Florida State.

In 2003, he was ineligible for competition, but he did participate in practice. He was moved to free safety during spring workouts and was named the Most Outstanding Player on defense.

In 2002, he intercepted three passes for the season, tying for the team lead. He made 33 tackles for the season, 26 were solo stops. He also tallied two tackles behind the line of scrimmage. He was in for 710 snaps from scrimmage at cornerback, the third-highest total on the Wolfpack defense. He suffered an ankle sprain versus Virginia and was in for only four snaps the next week in the win over Florida State. He had a season-high seven tackles versus Duke.

In 2001, he played more snaps than any other true freshmen with 509. He started the last four games of the season at cornerback. He started against Clemson when team opened in a nickel package. He led the team in tackles with 14 versus then ninth-ranked Maryland. He posted the third-longest play in school history when he returned an interception from end zone to end zone versus Duke. He had a key fumble recovery in the win over Florida State. He tackled Virginia's Alvin Pearman for a loss of six yards on fourth down from the Pack's one-yard line in the fourth quarter to secure the shutout. He did not play in the Tangerine Bowl contest because he suffered a neck strain in pre-bowl workouts.

While at North Carolina State he played with future first round draft picks Mario Williams, Manny Lawson and John McCargo. The 2004 NC State defense ranked #1 in the country allowing 221.4 yards per game.

== Professional career ==
Pre-draft measurables
Height	Weight	Arm length	Hand span	Bench press
6 ft 1 1/8 in (1.86 m)	194 lb (88 kg)	30 3/4 in (0.78 m)	9 in (0.23 m)	11 reps
All values from NFL Combine

Hudson signed with the Carolina Panthers on March 15, 2010. His 2010 season with the team was his last in the NFL.

== Personal life ==
Hudson obtained his degree in sociology from NC State. He is the founder of the Hudson and Hundreds Foundation along with his wife Fresh Hudson.
