= Eric Heitmann =

American football player (born 1980)

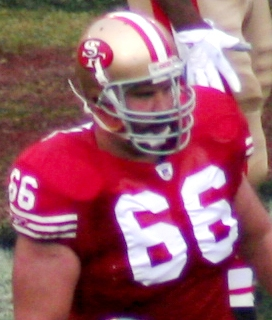
- Heitmann in action in a November 2007 game

No. 66
- Position: Center

Personal information
- Born: February 24, 1980 (age 46); Katy, Texas, U.S.
- Listed height: 6 ft 3 in (1.91 m)
- Listed weight: 312 lb (142 kg)

Career information
- High school: Katy
- College: Stanford
- NFL draft: 2002: 7th round, 239th overall pick

Career history
- San Francisco 49ers (2002–2010)

Awards and highlights
- First-team All-American (2001); First-team All-Pac-10 (2001); Second-team All-Pac-10 (2000)

Career NFL statistics
- Games played: 119
- Games started: 114
- Stats at Pro Football Reference

Eric Wade Heitmann (born February 24, 1980) is an American former professional football player who was a center for the San Francisco 49ers of the National Football League (NFL). He played college football for the Stanford Cardinal and was selected by the 49ers in the seventh round (239th overall) of the 2002 NFL draft.

== College career ==
Heitmann graduated from Stanford University where he was voted first-team All-American following the 2001 season. He played guard for his entire tenure as a Cardinal, and he was a three time All-Pac-10 selection. Heitmann became the first Stanford offensive lineman voted All-American since Bob Whitfield in 1992.

== Professional career ==
In 2002, Heitmann was the first rookie to start a game on the 49ers offensive line since 1987, when Harris Barton started at right tackle. He finished the 2002 season starting 12 games, including two playoff contests. He switched to center in the absence of regular center Jeremy Newberry. After an injury-plagued 2003 season, he started all 16 games in 2004.

Prior to the 2005 season, he worked to get stronger and more powerful under the tutelage of renowned strength coach Johnny Parker. His work paid off early in minicamps, and the 49ers signed him to a 4-year extension in June 2005. He started in all 16 games including 10 at right guard and six at center during the 2005 season.

Heitmann was converted to full-time center for the 2006 season. However, on December 14, in a game against the Seattle Seahawks, Heitmann broke his right tibia with 6:13 left in the first quarter on a two-yard run by Frank Gore. Heitmann was down on the field for several minutes before being taken to the locker room on a cart. He consequently had surgery on his knee and finished the 2006 season on injured reserve after having started the first 14 games. For his dedication and commitment, Heitmann was given the Bobb McKittrick award, named after the late 49ers offensive line coach.

In 2007, Heitmann had recovered from his injury and started all 16 games at center.
