= Damane Duckett =

American football player (born 1981)

No. 95, 68, 99
- Position: Defensive tackle

Personal information
- Born: January 21, 1981 (age 45); Waterbury, Connecticut, U.S.
- Listed height: 6 ft 7 in (2.01 m)
- Listed weight: 329 lb (149 kg)

Career information
- College: East Carolina
- NFL draft: 2004: undrafted

Career history
- Carolina Panthers (2004); New York Giants (2004–2005); San Francisco 49ers (2006–2008); New England Patriots (2009)*; BC Lions (2009–2010)
- * Offseason or practice squad member only

Career NFL statistics
- Games played: 20
- Total tackles: 13
- Sacks: 1
- Pass deflections: 1
- Stats at Pro Football Reference

Damane Jerrel Duckett (born January 21, 1981) is an American former professional football player who was a defensive tackle in the National Football League (NFL) and Canadian Football League (CFL). He played college football for the East Carolina Pirates and was signed by the Carolina Panthers as an undrafted free agent in 2004.

Duckett was also a member of the New York Giants, San Francisco 49ers, New England Patriots, and BC Lions.
