= Keith Lewis (safety) =

American football player (born 1981)

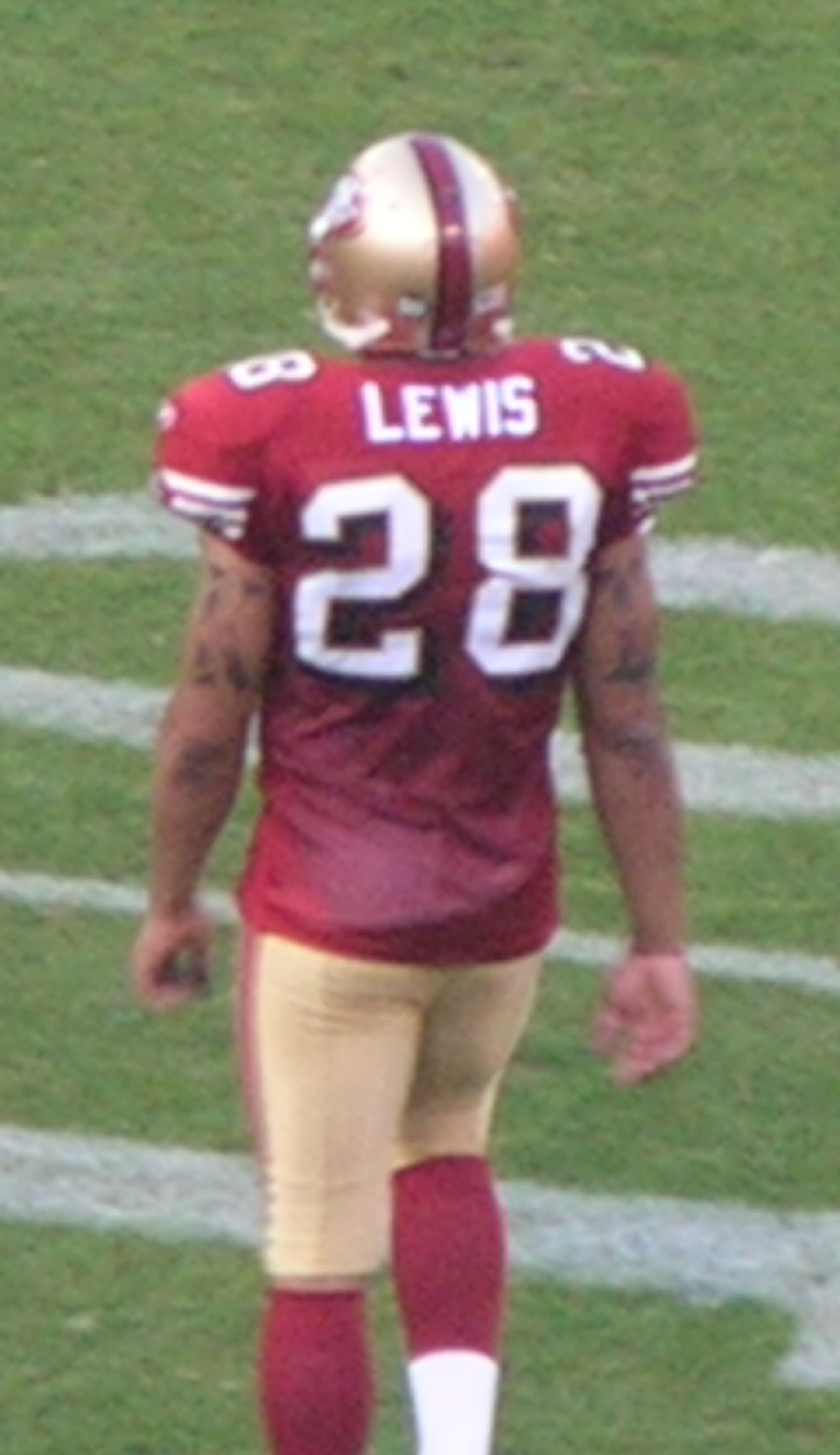
- Lewis with the San Francisco 49ers in 2008

No. 28
- Position: Safety

Personal information
- Born: November 20, 1981 (age 44); Sacramento, California, U.S.
- Listed height: 6 ft 0 in (1.83 m)
- Listed weight: 202 lb (92 kg)

Career information
- High school: Sacramento (CA) Valley
- College: Oregon
- NFL draft: 2004: 6th round, 198th overall pick

Career history
- San Francisco 49ers (2004–2008); Arizona Cardinals (2009)*; Carolina Panthers (2009)
- * Offseason or practice squad member only

Awards and highlights
- PFWA All-Rookie Team (2004); First-team All-Pac-10 (2003); Second-team All-Pac-10 (2002)

Career NFL statistics
- Total tackles: 158
- Sacks: 1
- Forced fumbles: 3
- Fumble recoveries: 2
- Interceptions: 3
- Stats at Pro Football Reference

Keith D'Andre Lewis (born October 20, 1981) is an American former professional football player who was a safety in the National Football League (NFL). He was selected by the San Francisco 49ers in the sixth round in 2004 NFL draft. He played college football for the Oregon Ducks.

Lewis was also a member of the Arizona Cardinals and Carolina Panthers.
