= Zak Keasey =

American football player (born 1982)

No. 55, 45
- Position: Fullback

Personal information
- Born: March 19, 1982 (age 44); Detroit, Michigan, U.S.
- Listed height: 6 ft 0 in (1.83 m)
- Listed weight: 245 lb (111 kg)

Career information
- College: Princeton
- NFL draft: 2005: undrafted

Career history
- Washington Redskins (2005); San Francisco 49ers (2006–2008); New Orleans Saints (2010)*
- * Offseason or practice squad member only

Awards and highlights
- Second-team All-American (2004) (FCS); 2× First-team All-Ivy League (2003-04)

Career NFL statistics
- Rushing attempts: 2
- Rushing yards: 4
- Receptions: 3
- Receiving yards: 25
- Total tackles: 13
- Stats at Pro Football Reference

Zakary A. Keasey (born March 19, 1982) is an American former professional football player who was a fullback and linebacker in the National Football League (NFL). Keasey played college football for the Princeton Tigers. He was a member of the NFL's Washington Redskins, San Francisco 49ers, and the New Orleans Saints.

== Early life and college ==
Keasey attended Lake Orion High School in Lake Orion, Michigan.

Keasey attended Princeton University, and was awarded the Poe-Kazmaier Trophy, the highest award given to a Princeton football player. As a linebacker, he was named to First Team All-Ivy League in both his junior and senior seasons. Keasey finished his senior season with 127 tackles, 16 tackles for loss, 8 sacks, 4 pass-breakups, 2 interceptions and 1 fumble recovery. He was subsequently named a FCS second team All-American.

== Professional career ==
=== Washington Redskins ===
Keasey signed with the Washington Redskins as an undrafted rookie free agent in 2005. He was offered a contract after a successful mini-camp tryout at the invitation of Redskins defensive coordinator Gregg Williams. Williams' son, Blake, was a college teammate of Keasey. Keasey went on to make the initial regular season 53 man roster as a reserve linebacker. He later participated on the Redskins practice squad.

=== San Francisco 49ers ===
In 2006, Keasey signed with the San Francisco 49ers, where he made the transition from linebacker to fullback. He spent the 2006 season on the practice squad. Keasey entered the 2007 season as a member of the 49ers practice squad, and was signed to the active roster on September 21, 2007; taking the roster spot of injured linebacker Manny Lawson. Keasey was cut and then resigned several times, ultimately appearing in 13 games.

Keasey entered the 2008 NFL season as a challenger for the starting fullback position with the 49ers. On August 30, 2008, Keasey was named starting fullback over veteran Moran Norris, who was subsequently released. After starting the first 7 games of the 2008 season, Keasey was placed on injured reserve in week 8 with a torn biceps tendon. He was replaced in the 49ers starting lineup by all purpose back Michael Robinson.

Keasey broke his forearm in the first preseason game against the Denver Broncos on August 14, 2009. He was expected to miss eight weeks with the injury. On August 19, 2009, Keasey was released by the San Francisco 49ers with an injury settlement to make room for more roster depth on the training camp squad.

=== New Orleans Saints ===
Keasey signed a future contract with the New Orleans Saints on February 23, 2010. He was released during final roster cuts on September 4, 2010.
