= 2007 San Francisco 49ers season =

American football team season

- Owner: Denise DeBartolo York and John York
- General manager: Mike Nolan
- President: John York
- Head coach: Mike Nolan
- Offensive coordinator: Jim Hostler
- Defensive coordinator: Greg Manusky
- Home stadium: Monster Park

Results
- Record: 5–11
- Division place: 3rd NFC West
- Playoffs: Did not qualify
- All-Pros: Patrick Willis (1st team); Andy Lee (1st team)
- Pro Bowlers: ILB Patrick Willis; P Andy Lee

Uniform

The 2007 San Francisco 49ers season was the franchise's 62nd season, and 58th in the National Football League (NFL). They ended their season with a disappointing record of 5–11 in 2007, failing to improve upon their 7–9 record from 2006. They started 2-0, but went 3-11 in their final 14 games of the season.

The 49ers offense struggled all season long—starting quarterback Alex Smith injured his shoulder early in the season, and newly promoted offensive coordinator Jim Hostler was the subject of much scrutiny and criticism regarding his play calling. Hostler was fired following the season.

2007 is also noted for being defensive lineman Bryant Young's final season; the future Hall of Fame enshrinee was the last remaining member of San Francisco's Super Bowl XXIX championship team.

== Staff ==
2007 San Francisco 49ers staff
Front office: Owner/chairman –; Vice chairman –; Executive vice president/interim CEO –; Senior vice president/general manager –; Vice president of football operations –; Head coaches: Head coach – Mike Nolan; Assistant head coach-defense/linebackers – Mike Singletary; Special assistant to the head coach – Robert Talley; Offensive coaches: Offensive coordinator – Jim Hostler; Quarterbacks – Frank Cignetti Jr.; Running backs – Bishop Harris; Senior assistant/wide receivers – Jerry Sullivan; Tight ends – Pete Hoener; Offensive line – George Warhop; Offensive assistant/offensive line – Mark Nori; Offensive assistant – Ted Tollner; Offensive quality control – Shane Day	Defensive coaches: Defensive coordinator – Greg Manusky; Defensive line – Jim Tomsula; Defensive backs/secondary – Johnnie Lynn; Defensive backs – Vance Joseph; Defensive assistant/outside linebackers – Jason Tarver; Special teams coaches: Special teams coordinator – Al Everest; Assistant special teams – Jeff Rodgers; Strength and conditioning: Strength and conditioning – strength coach Johnny Parker; Assistant strength and conditioning – Duane Carlisle; Head athletic trainer – Jeff Ferguson

== Offseason ==
=== Free agency ===
The 49ers addressed their problems in the secondary with the signing of veteran cornerback Nate Clements from the Buffalo Bills. The contract was worth $80 million for 8 years, the largest contract given to a defensive player in NFL history. They also signed strong safety Michael Lewis from Philadelphia on the same day. Other key defensive pickups included linebackers Colby Bockwoldt and Tully Banta-Cain and nosetackle Aubrayo Franklin. The team also addressed its wide-receiver needs by signing former Denver Bronco and Atlanta Falcon, Ashley Lelie and Seattle Seahawk, Darrell Jackson. San Francisco also used the free agency period to extend Gore's contract to 4 years worth $28 million, $14 million of which is guaranteed.

=== Draft ===
In the 2007 NFL draft, they addressed their need for an inside linebacker by picking Patrick Willis in the first round and also gave up their 2008 first round pick to the New England Patriots and selected 28 overall Offensive Tackle Joe Staley. In the 2nd round the 49ers traded their pick for the Colts' number one pick in the 2008 NFL draft. On the second day of the NFL Draft, the San Francisco 49ers traded a 4th round pick for Seattle Seahawks leading receiver, Darrell Jackson.

2007 San Francisco 49ers draft
Round	Pick	Player	Position	College	Notes
1	11	Patrick Willis * ^{†}	LB	Ole Miss	
1	28	Joe Staley *	OT	Central Michigan	from New England
3	76	Jason Hill	WR	Washington State	
3	97	Ray McDonald	DE	Florida	
4	104	Jay Moore	DE	Nebraska	from Washington
4	126	Dashon Goldson *	S	Washington	from New Orleans via Indianapolis
4	135	Joe Cohen	DE	Florida	
5	147	Tarell Brown	CB	Texas	
6	186	Thomas Clayton	RB	Kansas State	
Made roster † Pro Football Hall of Fame * Made at least one Pro Bowl during career

== Roster ==
2007 San Francisco 49ers roster
Quarterbacks (QB): 12 Trent Dilfer; 13 Shaun Hill; 7 Drew Olson; 17 Chris Weinke; Running backs (RB): 21 Frank Gore; 43 Maurice Hicks; 45 Zak Keasey FB; 44 Moran Norris FB; 24 Michael Robinson; Wide receivers (WR): 83 Arnaz Battle; 81 Bryan Gilmore; 89 Jason Hill; 82 Darrell Jackson; 18 Ashley Lelie; 84 Michael Lewis; Tight ends (TE): 47 Billy Bajema; 85 Vernon Davis; 46 Delanie Walker	Offensive linemen (OL): 71 Larry Allen G; 64 David Baas G; 63 Damane Duckett T; 77 Kwame Harris T; 66 Eric Heitmann C; 68 Adam Snyder T; 74 Joe Staley T; 69 Tony Wragge C; Defensive linemen (DL): 94 Marques Douglas DE; 78 Atiyyah Ellison NT; 93 Ronald Fields DE; 92 Aubrayo Franklin NT; 91 Ray McDonald DE; 90 Isaac Sopoaga NT; 97 Bryant Young DE	Linebackers (LB): 95 Tully Banta-Cain OLB; 54 Roderick Green OLB; 98 Parys Haralson OLB; 56 Brandon Moore OLB; 50 Derek Smith ILB; 53 Jeff Ulbrich ILB; 52 Patrick Willis ILB; Defensive backs (DB): 25 Tarell Brown CB; 22 Nate Clements CB; 38 Dashon Goldson SS; 27 Walt Harris CB; 23 Marcus Hudson CB; 28 Keith Lewis FS; 32 Michael Lewis SS; 26 Mark Roman FS; 36 Shawntae Spencer CB; 30 Donald Strickland CB; Special teams (ST): 86 Brian Jennings LS; 4 Andy Lee P; 6 Joe Nedney K	Practice squad: 29 Darnell Bing S; 35 Thomas Clayton RB; 40 Markus Curry CB; 51 Steve Dildine LB; 60 Sean Estrada G; 19 Jerard Rabb WR; 67 Tavares Washington T; 15 Dominique Zeigler WR (IR); Reserve: 14 C. J. Brewer WR (IR); 76 Joe Cohen NT (IR); 75 Jonas Jennings T (IR); 99 Manny Lawson LB (IR); 58 Jay Moore LB (IR); 96 Melvin Oliver DE (PUP); 65 Justin Smiley G (IR); 11 Alex Smith QB (IR); 20 B. J. Tucker CB (IR); Rookies in italics 53 active, 10 reserve, 8 practice squad

== Preseason ==
=== Schedule ===
Week	Date	Opponent	Result	Record	Venue	Recap
1	August 13	Denver Broncos	L 13–17	0–1	Monster Park	Recap
2	August 18	Oakland Raiders	W 26–21	1–1	Monster Park	Recap
3	August 25	at Chicago Bears	L 28–31	1–2	Soldier Field	Recap
4	August 30	at San Diego Chargers	L 13–16	1–3	Qualcomm Stadium	Recap

== Regular season ==
=== Schedule ===
Week	Date	Opponent	Result	Record	Venue	Recap
1	September 10	**Arizona Cardinals**	**W** 20–17	1–0	Monster Park	Recap
2	September 16	at **St. Louis Rams**	**W** 17–16	2–0	Edward Jones Dome	Recap
3	September 23	at Pittsburgh Steelers	**L** 16–37	2–1	Heinz Field	Recap
4	September 30	**Seattle Seahawks**	**L** 3–23	2–2	Monster Park	Recap
5	October 7	Baltimore Ravens	**L** 7–9	2–3	Monster Park	Recap
6	Bye					
7	October 21	at New York Giants	**L** 15–33	2–4	Giants Stadium	Recap
8	October 28	New Orleans Saints	**L** 10–31	2–5	Monster Park	Recap
9	November 4	at Atlanta Falcons	**L** 16–20	2–6	Georgia Dome	Recap
10	November 12	at **Seattle Seahawks**	**L** 0–24	2–7	Qwest Field	Recap
11	November 18	**St. Louis Rams**	**L** 9–13	2–8	Monster Park	Recap
12	November 25	at **Arizona Cardinals**	**W** 37–31 (OT)	3–8	University of Phoenix Stadium	Recap
13	December 2	at Carolina Panthers	**L** 14–31	3–9	Bank of America Stadium	Recap
14	December 9	Minnesota Vikings	**L** 7–27	3–10	Monster Park	Recap
15	December 15	Cincinnati Bengals	**W** 20–13	4–10	Monster Park	Recap
16	December 23	Tampa Bay Buccaneers	**W** 21–19	5–10	Monster Park	Recap
17	December 30	at Cleveland Browns	**L** 7–20	5–11	Cleveland Browns Stadium	Recap
Note: Intra-division opponents are in **bold** text.

=== Game summaries ===
==== Week 1: vs. Arizona Cardinals ====
Quarter	1	2	3	4	Total
Cardinals	0	10	0	7	**17**
**49ers**	7	3	3	7	**20**

at Bill Walsh Field at Monster Park, San Francisco, California

- Date: Sunday, September 10, 2007
- Game time: 10:25 pm EDT/7:25 pm PDT
- Game weather: 62 °F (17 °C) (Clear)
- Game attendance: 68,111
- Referee: Walt Coleman
- TV announcers (ESPN): Mike Greenberg, Mike Golic, Mike Ditka, & Bonnie Bernstein

Dressed up in their throwback uniforms, the 49ers began their 2007 campaign against their NFC West rival, the Arizona Cardinals in the second game of the Monday Night Football doubleheader. In the first quarter, the Niners drew first blood as RB Frank Gore got a 6-yard TD run for the score of the period. However, in the second quarter, the Cardinals took the lead with kicker with Neil Rackers getting a 35-yard field goal and RB Edgerrin James getting a 7-yard TD run. San Francisco ended the half with kicker Joe Nedney getting a 33-yard field goal.

In the third quarter, the 49ers retook the lead with Nedney kicking a 30-yard field goal for the only score of the period. In the fourth quarter, Arizona jumped ahead with QB Matt Leinart completing a 5-yard TD pass to WR Anquan Boldin. With time running out late in the game, QB Alex Smith led the Niners on a last-minute drive that included a 20-yard run by Alex Smith and ended with WR Arnaz Battle getting a 1-yard TD run. The Cardinals had just enough time to try a late-game comeback, but San Francisco clinched the game with CB Shawntae Spencer getting an interception for the win. Matt Leinart's first and last passes in the game were both interceptions.

With the win, not only did the 49ers begin their year at 1–0, but Mike Nolan finally got his first win against Arizona as a head coach.

Scoring summary

Q1 – SF – 11:24 – Frank Gore 6-yard TD run (Joe Nedney kick) (SF 7–0)

Q2 – ARI – 12:55 – Neil Rackers 35-yard FG (SF 7–3)

Q2 – ARI – 9:15 – Edgerrin James 7-yard TD run (Rackers kick) (ARI 10–7)

Q2 – SF – 3:40 – Joe Nedney 33-yard FG (10–10)

Q3 – SF – 11:20 – Joe Nedney 30-yard FG (SF 13–10)

Q4 – ARI – 6:46 – 5-yard TD pass from Matt Leinart to Anquan Boldin (Rackers kick) (ARI 17–13)

Q4 – SF – 0:26 – Arnaz Battle 1-yard TD run (Nedney kick) (SF 20–17)

==== Week 2: at St. Louis Rams ====
Quarter	1	2	3	4	Total
**49ers**	0	7	7	3	**17**
Rams	7	6	0	3	**16**

at Edward Jones Dome, St. Louis, Missouri

- Date: Sunday, September 16, 2007
- Game time: 1:00 pm EDT/10 AM PDT
- Game weather: 78 °F (26 °C) (Sunny) (Game was played indoors)
- Game attendance: 65,295
- Referee: Jeff Triplette
- TV announcers (Fox): Dick Stockton & Brian Baldinger

Coming off their divisional home win over the Cardinals, the 49ers flew to the Edward Jones Dome for a Week 2 divisional duel against their NFC West rival, the St. Louis Rams.

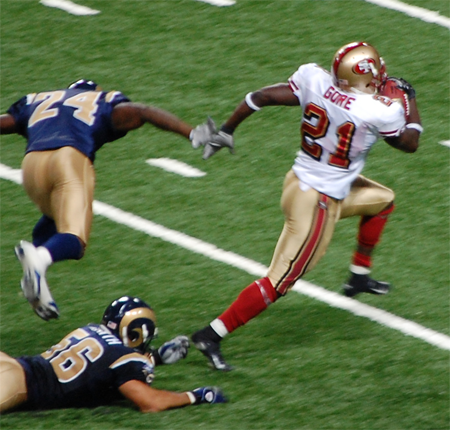
Frank Gore breaks tackles and sprints for a touchdown on a 4th down and short play, during week 2

In the first quarter, the Niners trailed early as Rams QB Marc Bulger completed a 12-yard TD pass to WR Torry Holt for the only score of the period. In the second quarter, San Francisco tied the game with RB Frank Gore getting a 1-yard TD run. St. Louis took the halftime lead on a Jeff Wilkins 29-yard field goal.

In the third quarter, the 49ers took the lead with Gore breaking through a gang of tacklers for a 43-yard TD run, along with the only score of the period. In the fourth quarter, the Rams retook the lead with Wiklins getting a 53-yard field goal. Because a St. Louis goof-up on special teams, the Niners took the lead with kicker Joe Nedney getting a 40-yard field goal. Near the end the game, the Rams had one last chance to win the game, but Wilkins' 56-yard field goal attempt fell about a yard short of the crossbar.

With the win, the 49ers improved to 2–0 for the first time since 1998.

Scoring summary

Q1 – STL – 6:04 – 12-yard TD pass from Marc Bulger to Torry Holt (Wilkins kick) (STL 7–0)

Q2 – SF – 14:57 – Frank Gore 1-yard TD run (Nedney kick) (7–7)

Q2 – STL – 9:04 – Jeff Wilkins 27-yard FG (STL 10–7)

Q2 – STL – 1:51 – Jeff Wilkins 29-yard FG (STL 13–7)

Q3 – SF – 2:43 – Frank Gore 43-yard TD run (Nedney kick) (SF 14–13)

Q4 – STL – 10:04 – Jeff Wilkins 53-yard FG (STL 16–14)

Q4 – SF – 3:23 – Joe Nedney 40-yard FG (SF 17–16)

==== Week 3: at Pittsburgh Steelers ====
Quarter	1	2	3	4	Total
49ers	6	0	3	7	**16**
**Steelers**	7	7	3	20	**37**

at Heinz Field, Pittsburgh, Pennsylvania

- Date: Sunday, September 23, 2007
- Game weather: 72 °F (22 °C) (Sunny)
- Game attendance: 64,313
- Referee: Gerry Austin
- TV announcers (Fox): = Kenny Albert, Daryl Johnston, and Tony Siragusa

Game summary

Coming off a fierce divisional road win over the Rams, the 49ers flew to Heinz Field for an interconference duel with the Pittsburgh Steelers. In the first quarter, the Niners struck first with kicker Joe Nedney getting a 32-yard field goal. The Steelers immediately responded with CB–RS Allen Rossum returning a kickoff 98 yards for a touchdown. San Francisco wrapped up the period with Nedney kicking a 22-yard field goal. In the second quarter, Pittsburgh increased its lead with QB Ben Roethlisberger completing a 9-yard TD pass to TE Jerame Tuman for the only score of the period.

In the third quarter, the Steelers increased its lead with kicker Jeff Reed nailing a 36-yard field goal. The Niners replied with Nedney kicking a 49-yard field goal. In the fourth quarter, Pittsburgh took control with Reed getting a 49-yard and a 35-yard field goal, while CB Bryant McFadden returned an interception 50 yards for a touchdown. San Francisco got a touchdown as QB Alex Smith completed a 21-yard pass to WR Taylor Jacobs. Afterwards, the Steelers ended the game with RB Najeh Davenport getting a 39-yard TD run.

With the loss, the 49ers fell to 2–1.

Scoring summary

Q1 – SF – 9:24 – Joe Nedney 32-yard FG (SF 3–0)

Q1 – PIT – 9:12 – Allen Rossum 98-yard kickoff return (PIT 7–3)

Q1 – SF – 3:01 – Joe Nedney 22-yard FG (PIT 7–6)

Q2 – PIT – 0:37 – Jerame Tuman 9-yard pass from Ben Roethlisberger (Jeff Reed kick) (PIT 14–6)

Q3 – PIT – 9:41 – Jeff Reed 36-yard FG (PIT 17–6)

Q3 – SF – 4:46 – Joe Nedney 49-yard FG (PIT 17–9)

Q4 – PIT – 14:55 – Jeff Reed 49-yard FG (PIT 20–9)

Q4 – PIT – 4:59 – Jeff Reed 35-yard FG (PIT 23–9)

Q4 – PIT – 4:01 – Bryant McFadden 50-yard interception return (Reed kick) (PIT 30–9)

Q4 – SF – 2:22 – Taylor Jacobs 21-yard pass from Alex Smith (Nedney kick) (PIT 30–16)

Q4 – PIT – 1:51 – Najeh Davenport 39-yard run (Nedney kick) (PIT 37–16)

==== Week 4: vs. Seattle Seahawks ====
Quarter	1	2	3	4	Total
**Seahawks**	0	13	7	3	**23**
49ers	0	0	3	0	**3**

at Bill Walsh Field at Monster Park, San Francisco, California

- Date: Sunday, September 30, 2007
- Game time: 1:05 pm PDT
- Game weather: 68 °F (20 °C) (Sunny)
- Game attendance: 67,651
- Referee: Mike Carey
- TV announcers (Fox): Kenny Albert, Daryl Johnston, and Tony Siragusa

Hoping to rebound from their road loss to the Steelers, the 49ers went home and played an NFC West battle with the Seattle Seahawks. In the first quarter, the Niners lost QB Alex Smith with a separated shoulder during a sack. Back-up QB Trent Dilfer took over for the rest of the game. In the second quarter, San Francisco's recent woes continued with Seahawks kicker Josh Brown getting a 23-yard field goal. Afterwards, Seattle began to pound away with QB Matt Hasselbeck completing a 17-yard TD pass to WR Bobby Engram, along with Brown kicking a 31-yard field goal.

In the third quarter, the Seahawks continued their domination as Hasselbeck completed a 14-yard TD pass to TE Marcus Pollard. The Niners got their only score of the game as kicker Joe Nedney got a 43-yard field goal. In the fourth quarter, Seattle sealed San Francisco's doom with Brown nailing a 25-yard field goal.

With their second-straight loss, the 49ers fell to 2–2.

==== Week 5: vs. Baltimore Ravens ====
Quarter	1	2	3	4	Total
**Ravens**	0	6	3	0	**9**
49ers	0	7	0	0	**7**

at Bill Walsh Field at Monster Park, San Francisco, California

- Date: Sunday, October 7, 2007
- Game weather: 73 °F (23 °C) (Sunny)
- Game attendance: 67,885
- Referee: Bill Leavy
- TV announcers (CBS): Ian Eagle and Solomon Wilcots

Trying to break a two-game skid, the 49ers stayed at home for a Week 5 interconference matchup with the Baltimore Ravens. With QB Alex Smith out with a shoulder injury, back-up Trent Dilfer was given the start against the team to which he helped deliver a Super Bowl title.

After a scoreless first quarter, the Ravens got the lead with kicker Matt Stover getting a 26-yard and a 32-yard field goal. In the third quarter, Baltimore increased its lead with Stover nailing a 49-yard field goal. The Niners came close to taking the lead with Dilfer completing a 49-yard TD pass to WR Arnaz Battle. With two minutes left in the fourth quarter, the 49ers had a chance to take the lead, but kicker Joe Nedney missed a 52-yard field goal and the Ravens ran out the clock.

With their third straight loss, the 49ers entered their bye week at 2–3.

==== Week 7: at New York Giants ====
Quarter	1	2	3	4	Total
49ers	0	7	2	6	**15**
**Giants**	6	13	7	7	**33**

at Giants Stadium, East Rutherford, New Jersey

- Date: Sunday, October 14, 2007
- Game time: 1:00 pm EST
- Game weather: 69 °F (21 °C) (Sunny)
- Game attendance: 78,912
- Referee: Ron Winter
- TV announcers (Fox): Matt Vasgersian, Daryl Johnston, and Tony Siragusa

Trying to snap a three-game losing streak, the 49ers flew to Giants Stadium for a Week 7 brawl with the New York Giants. With QB Alex Smith still recovering from a shoulder injury, back-up Trent Dilfer once again got the start. In the first quarter, the Niners trailed early as Giants QB Eli Manning hooked up with WR Amani Toomer on a 4-yard TD pass (with a missed PAT) for the only score of the period. In the second quarter, San Francisco took the lead with Dilfer completing a 17-yard TD pass to WR Arnaz Battle. However, New York responded with RB Brandon Jacobs getting a 5-yard TD run, while kicker Lawrence Tynes nailed field goals of 29 and 39 yards.

In the third quarter, things got worse for the Niners as Giants DE Osi Umenyiora sacked Dilfer, causing a fumble, picked up the loose ball, and ran 75 yards for a touchdown. San Francisco managed to get a safety as FB Moran Norris blocked a punt, which went out of bounds in the end zone. In the fourth quarter, New York sealed its win with Manning completing a 2-yard TD pass to TE Jeremy Shockey. The Niners ended its day with Dilfer completing a 1-yard TD pass to WR Darrell Jackson (with a failed 2-point conversion).

With its fourth-straight loss, the 49ers fell to 2–4.

==== Week 8: vs. New Orleans Saints ====
Quarter	1	2	3	4	Total
**Saints**	10	14	0	7	**31**
49ers	0	0	3	7	**10**

at Bill Walsh Field at Monster Park, San Francisco, California

- Game time: 4:17 pm EST
- Game weather: 66 °F (19 °C) (Sunny)
- Game attendance: 68,244
- Referee: John Parry
- TV announcers (Fox): Matt Vasgersian and J.C. Pearson

Trying to snap a four-game skid, the 49ers went home for a Week 8 intraconference duel with the New Orleans Saints. QB Alex Smith (who was recovering from a separated right shoulder since Week 4) was healthy enough to get the start.

In the first quarter, San Francisco trailed early as Saints QB Drew Brees completed a 17-yard TD pass to WR Marques Colston, while kicker Olindo Mare nailed a 26-yard field goal. In the second quarter, the Niners' struggles continued as Brees completed a 2-yard TD pass to WR Terrance Copper, along with completing a 3-yard TD pass to Colston. In the third quarter, San Francisco managed to get on the board with kicker Joe Nedney getting a 29-yard field goal for the only score of the period. In the fourth quarter, New Orleans wrapped up the win with Brees and Colston hooking up with each other again on a 15-yard TD pass. The Niners' only response was Smith completing a 7-yard TD pass to TE Vernon Davis.

With their fifth-straight loss, the 49ers dropped to 2–5.

==== Week 9: at Atlanta Falcons ====
Quarter	1	2	3	4	Total
49ers	7	0	6	3	**16**
**Falcons**	7	7	0	6	**20**

at Georgia Dome, Atlanta

- Game weather: Game Played Indoors (Domed Stadium)
- Game attendance: 66,049
- Referee: Bill Carollo
- TV announcers (Fox): Matt Vasgersian and J.C. Pearson

Trying to break a five-game losing skid, the 49ers flew to the Georgia Dome for a Week 9 intraconference duel with the Atlanta Falcons. In the first quarter, the Niners struck first as RB Maurice Hicks got a 9-yard TD run. However, the Falcons answered with RB Warrick Dunn getting a 9-yard TD run. In the second quarter, San Francisco fell behind as Atlanta RB Ovie Mughelli got a 1-yard TD run for the only score of the period.

In the third quarter, the 49ers crept close as kicker Joe Nedney got a 49-yard and a 32-yard field goal. However, in the fourth quarter, the Falcons replied with kicker Morten Andersen getting a 33-yard field goal. Nedney and the Niners tried to close the gap as Nedney kicked a 22-yard field goal. Andersen's 27-yard field goal helped seal Atlanta's win.

With their sixth-straight loss, the 49ers dropped to 2–6.

==== Week 10: at Seattle Seahawks ====
Quarter	1	2	3	4	Total
49ers	0	0	0	0	**0**
**Seahawks**	10	7	0	7	**24**

at Qwest Field, Seattle

- Game weather: 49 °F (9 °C) (Cloudy)
- Game attendance: 68,331
- Referee: Larry Nemmers
- TV announcers (ESPN): Mike Tirico (play-by-play), Ron Jaworski, Tony Kornheiser (color commentators), Michele Tafoya, & Suzy Kolber (sideline reporters)

Trying to snap their six-game losing streak, the 49ers flew to Qwest Field for an NFC West rematch on Monday Night Football with the Seattle Seahawks. In the first quarter, the Niners trailed early as Seahawks QB Matt Hasselbeck completed a 1-yard TD pass to TE Will Heller, along with kicker Josh Brown. In the second quarter, San Francisco's struggles continued as RB Maurice Morris gave Seattle a 6-yard TD run for the only score of the period. After a scoreless third quarter, the Seahawks sealed the win and the season-sweep with Hasselbeck completing a 10-yard TD pass to WR D.J. Hackett.

With their seventh-straight loss, the 49ers fell to 2–7.

==== Week 11: vs. St. Louis Rams ====
Quarter	1	2	3	4	Total
**Rams**	7	3	0	3	**13**
49ers	3	0	0	6	**9**

at Bill Walsh Field at Monster Park, San Francisco

- Game time: 4:15 pm EDT/1:15 pm PDT
- Game weather: 62 °F (17 °C) (Mostly Cloudy)
- Game attendance: 68,039
- Referee: Ed Hochuli
- TV announcers (Fox): Chris Myers (play-by-play) & Rod Woodson (color commentator)

Trying to break their seven-game losing skid, the 49ers went home, donned their throwback uniforms, and played their Week 11 NFC West rematch with the St. Louis Rams. In the first quarter, the Niners' struggles continued as Rams QB Marc Bulger completed a 3-yard touchdown reception to WR Torry Holt. San Francisco managed to respond with kicker Joe Nedney 28-yard field goal. In the second quarter, St. Louis increased its lead with kicker Jeff Wilkins getting a 49-yard field goal for the only score of the period.

After a scoreless third quarter, the Rams sealed the win with Wilkins kicking a 35-yard field goal. The Niners tried to mount a comeback as Nedney nailed a 38-yard and a 46-yard field goal. However, on four-straight plays deep in St. Louis territory, four shots to the endzone resulted in 3 incompletions and an interception.

With their eighth-straight loss, the 49ers dropped to 2–8.

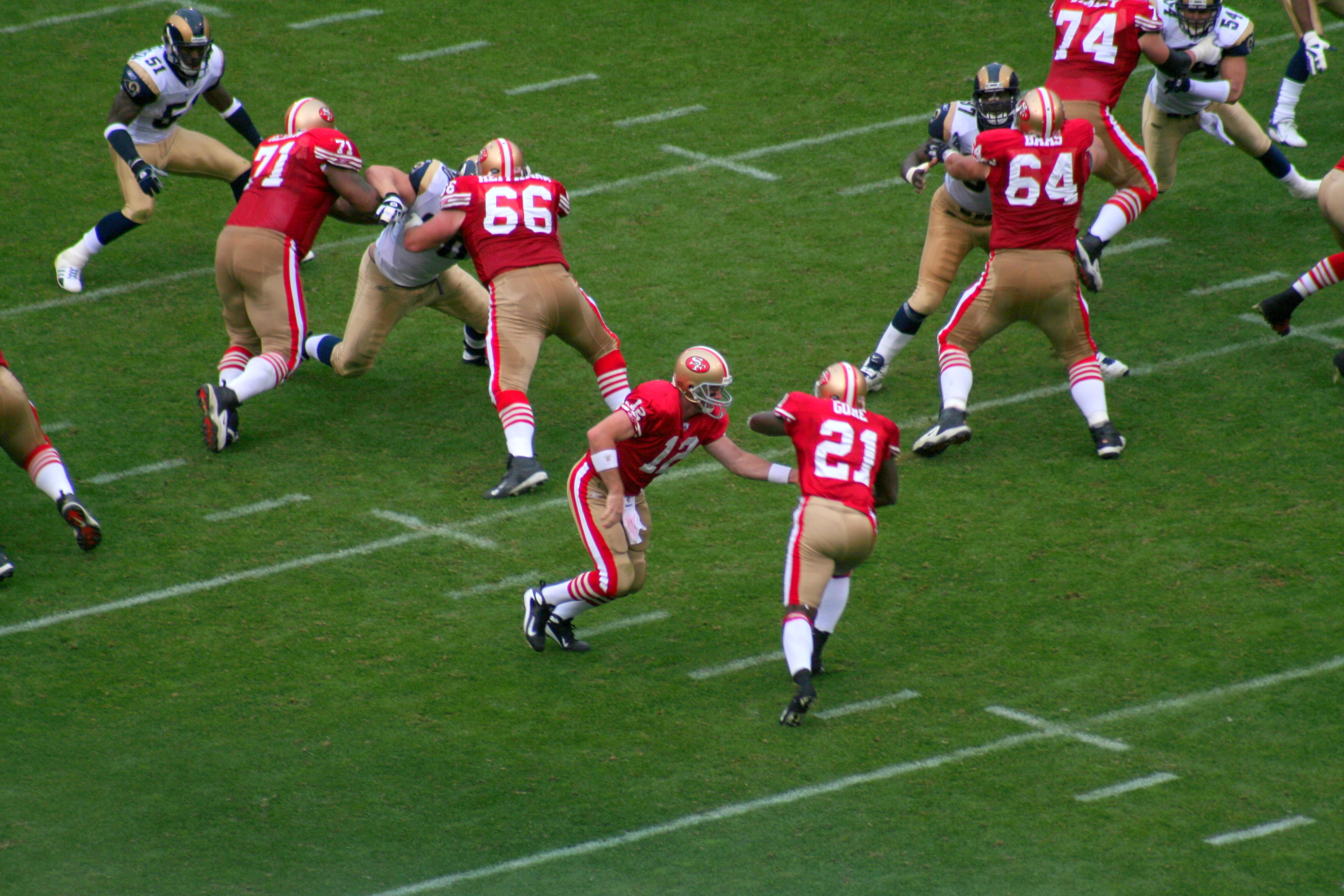
Frank Gore takes a handoff

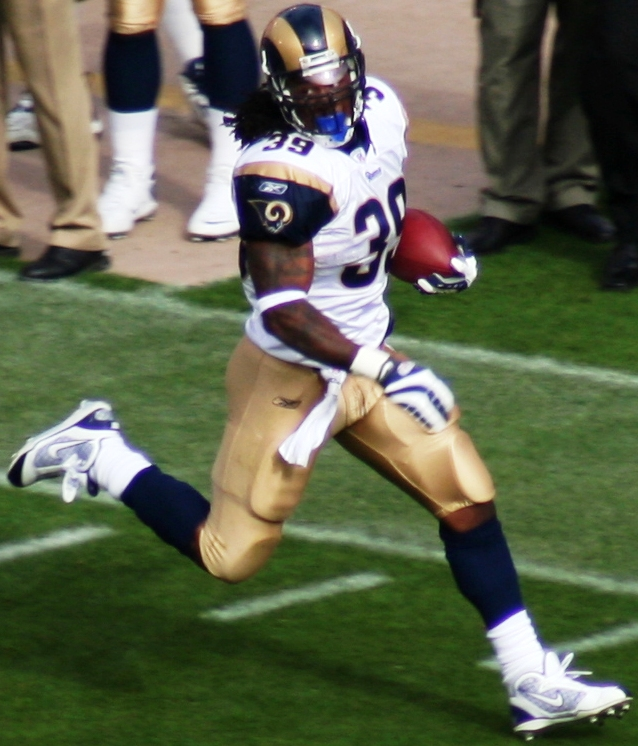
Rams running back Steven Jackson at the 49ers

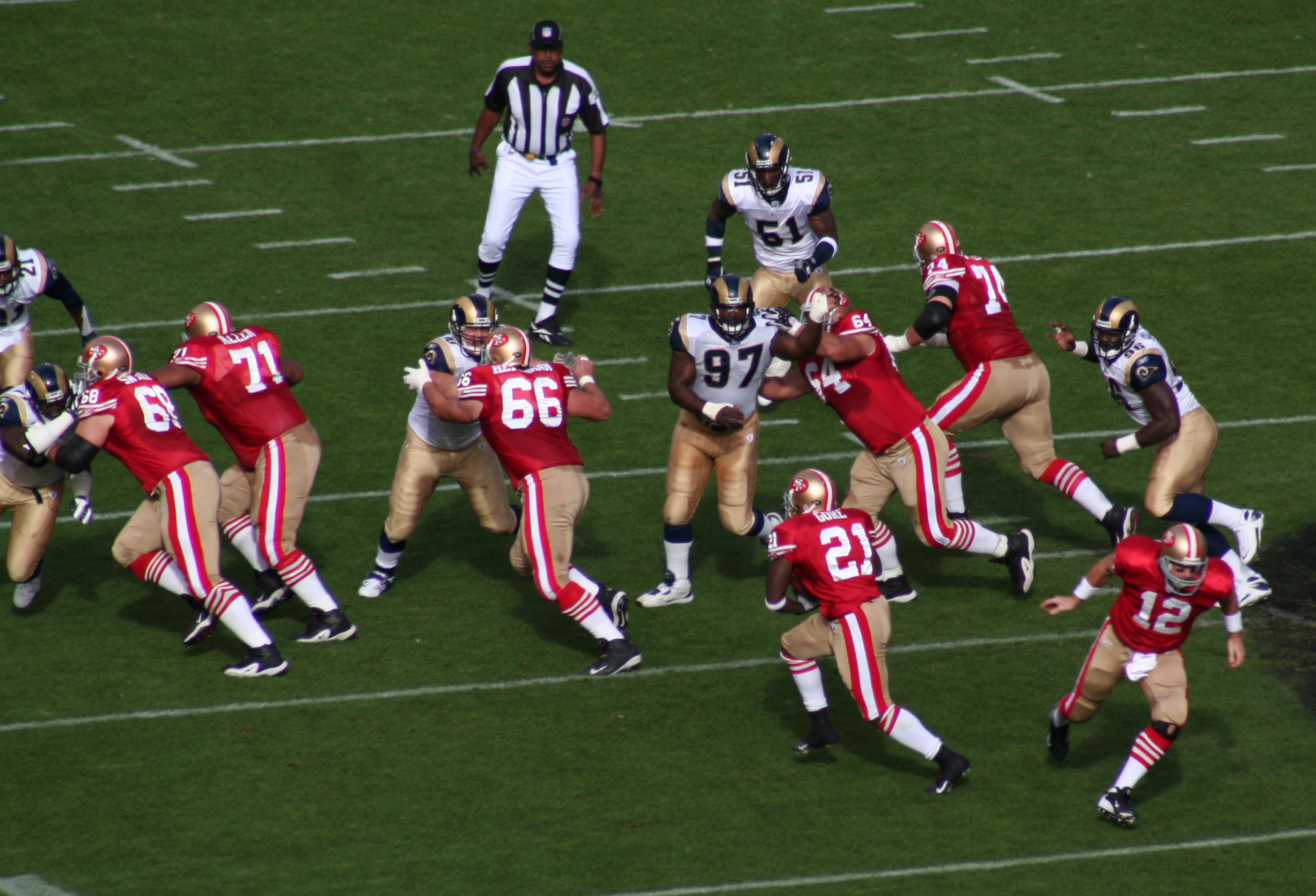
Gore runs up the middle

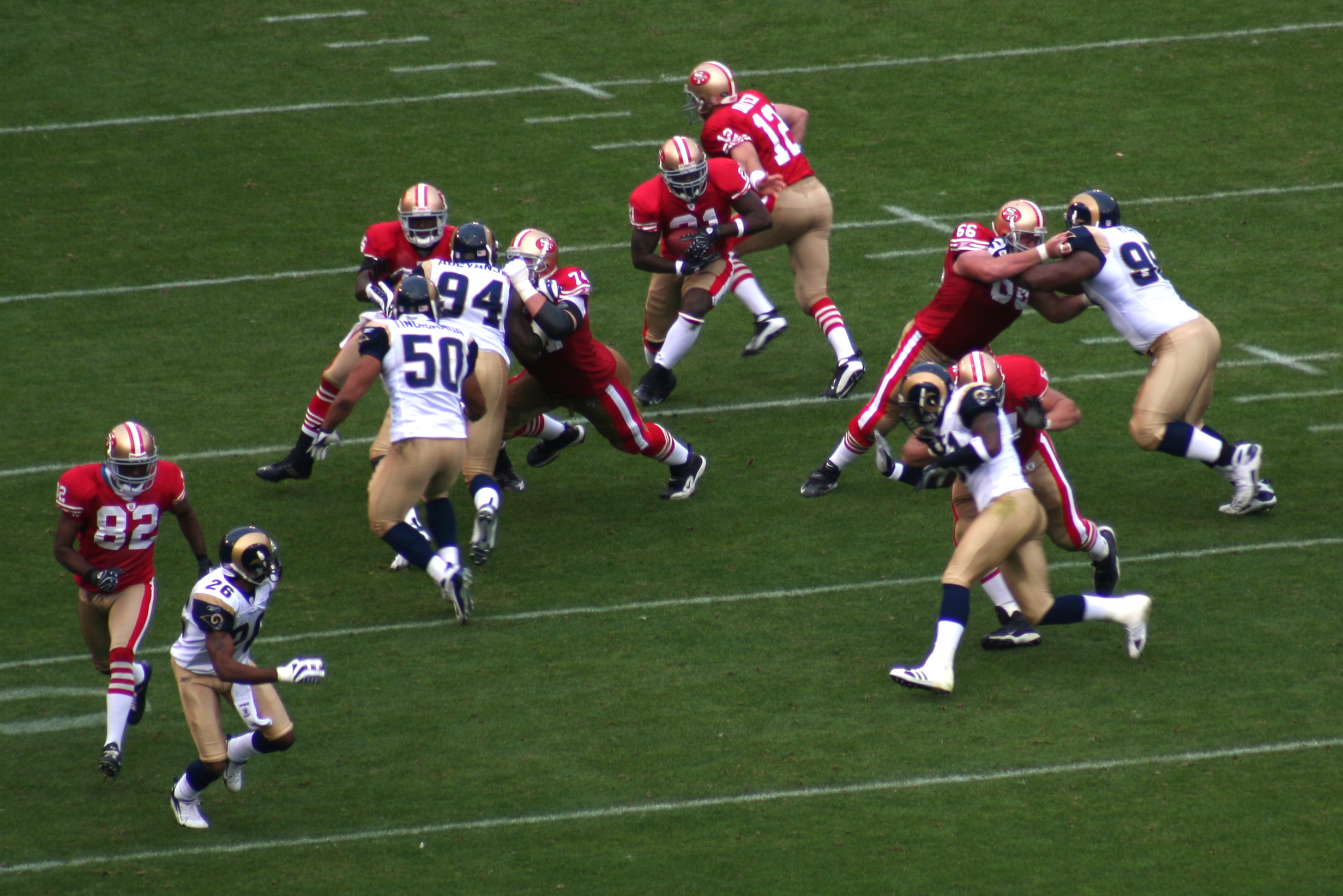
Trent Dilfer hands off to Gore

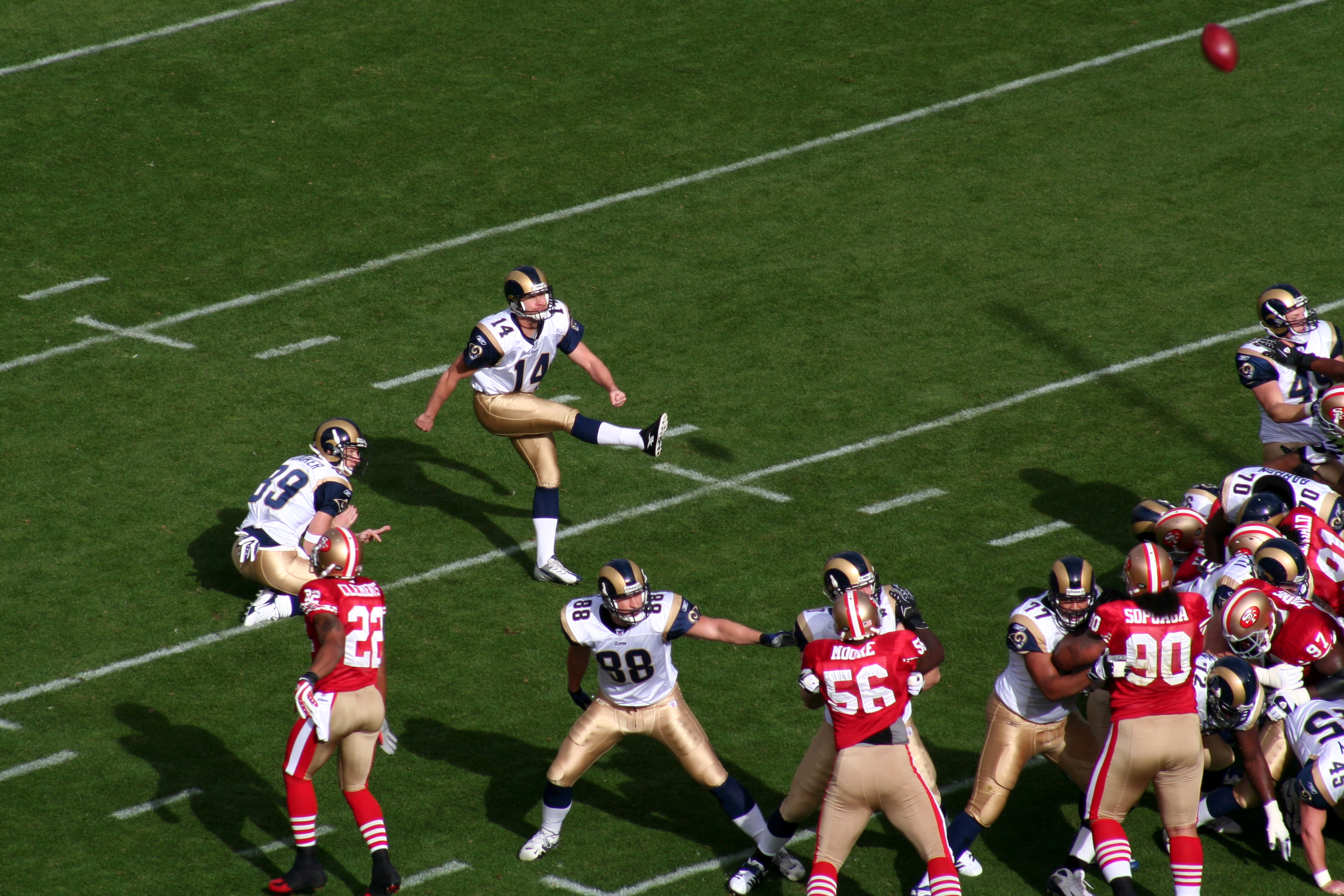
Jeff Wilkins attempts a kick for the Rams

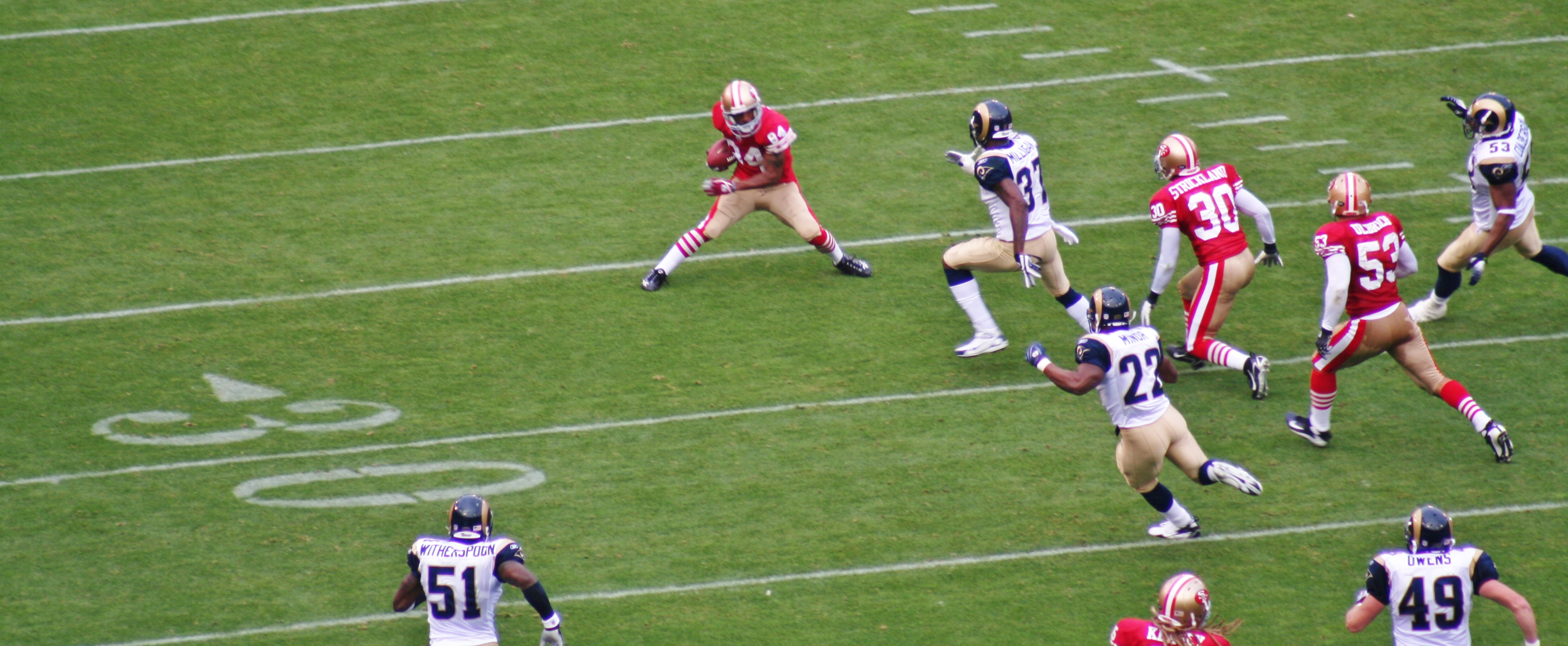
49ers punt return by Michael Lewis (wide receiver)

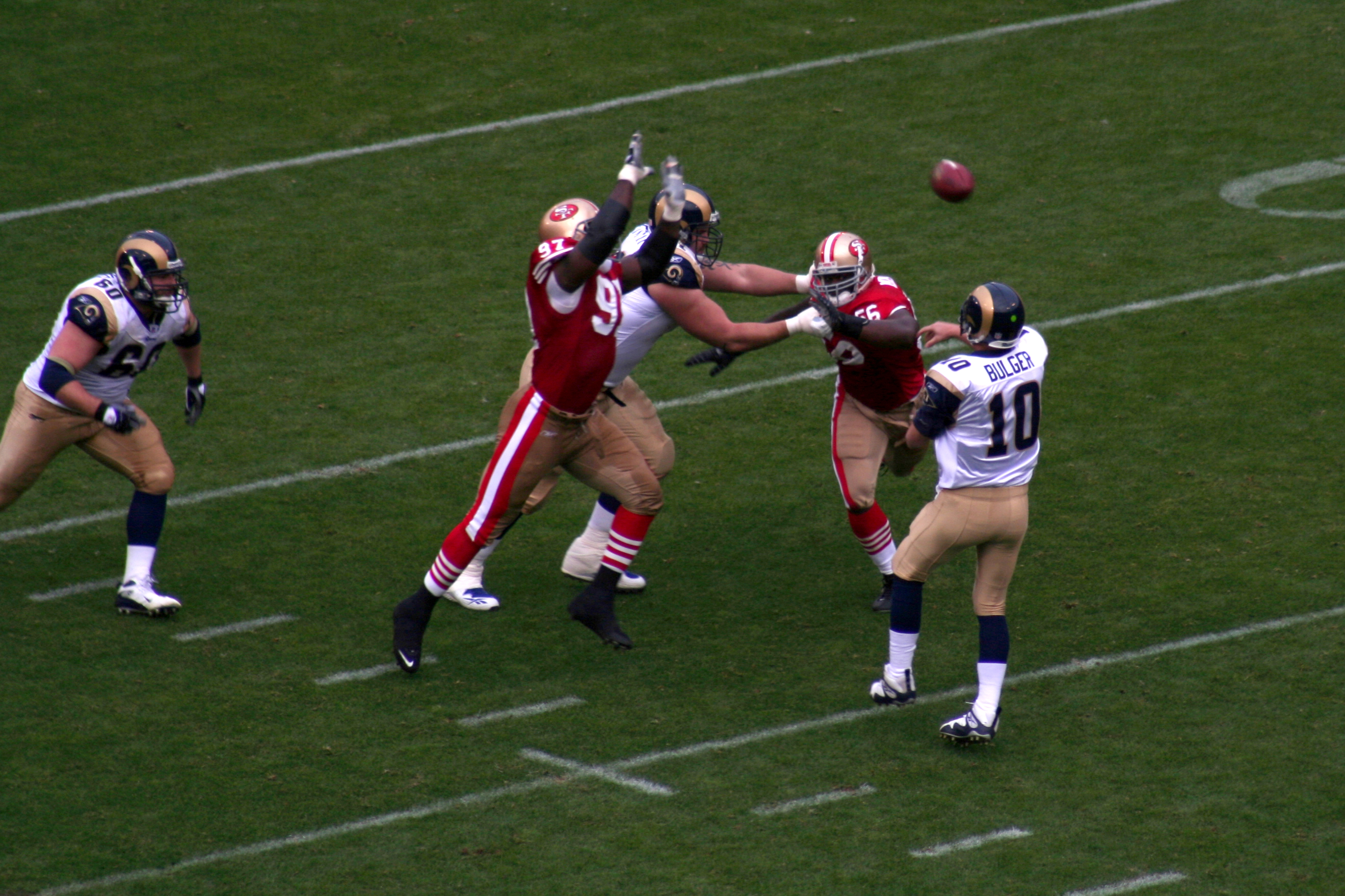
Rams QB Marc Bulger attempts a pass behind Brandon Moore (linebacker)

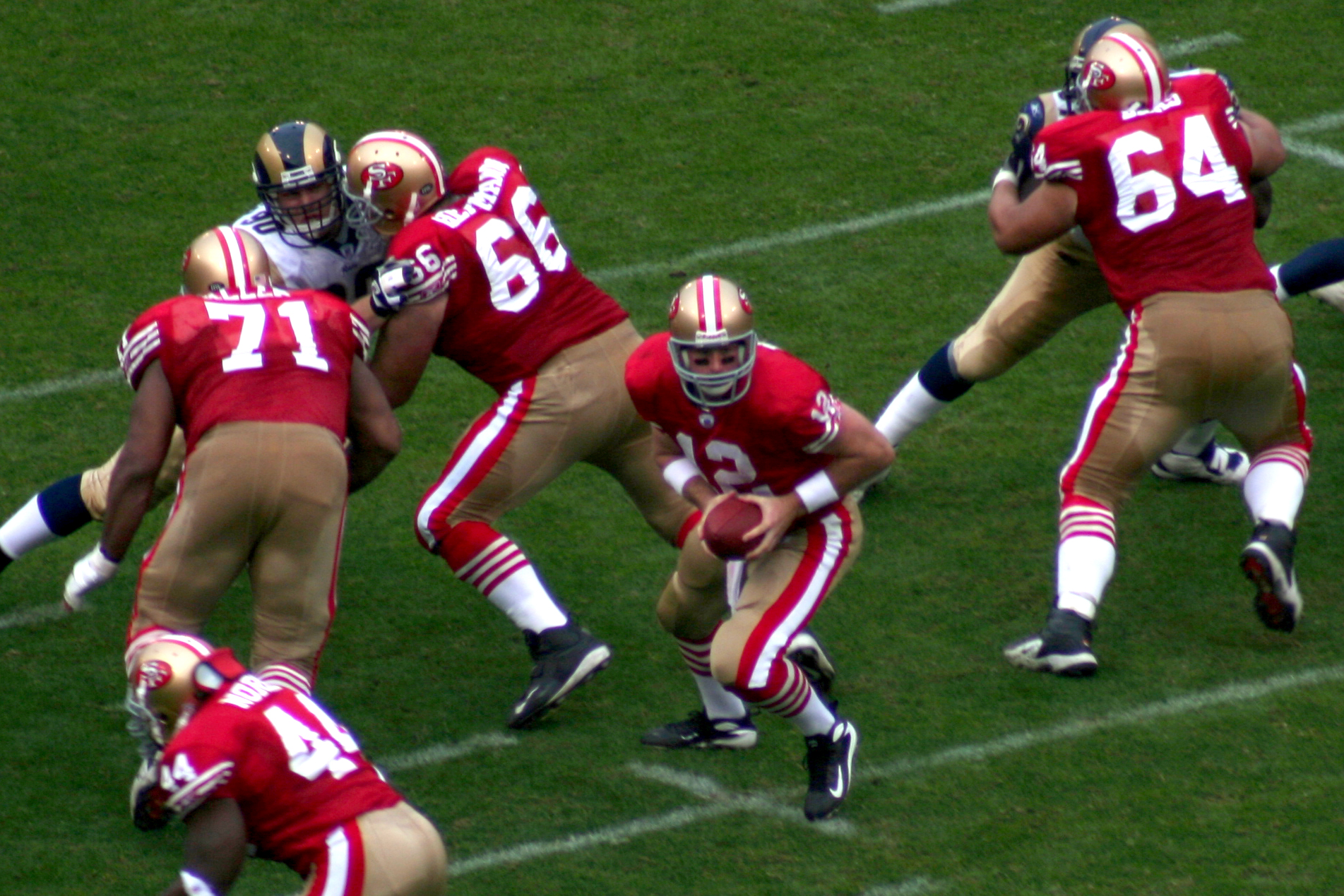
The 49ers on offense

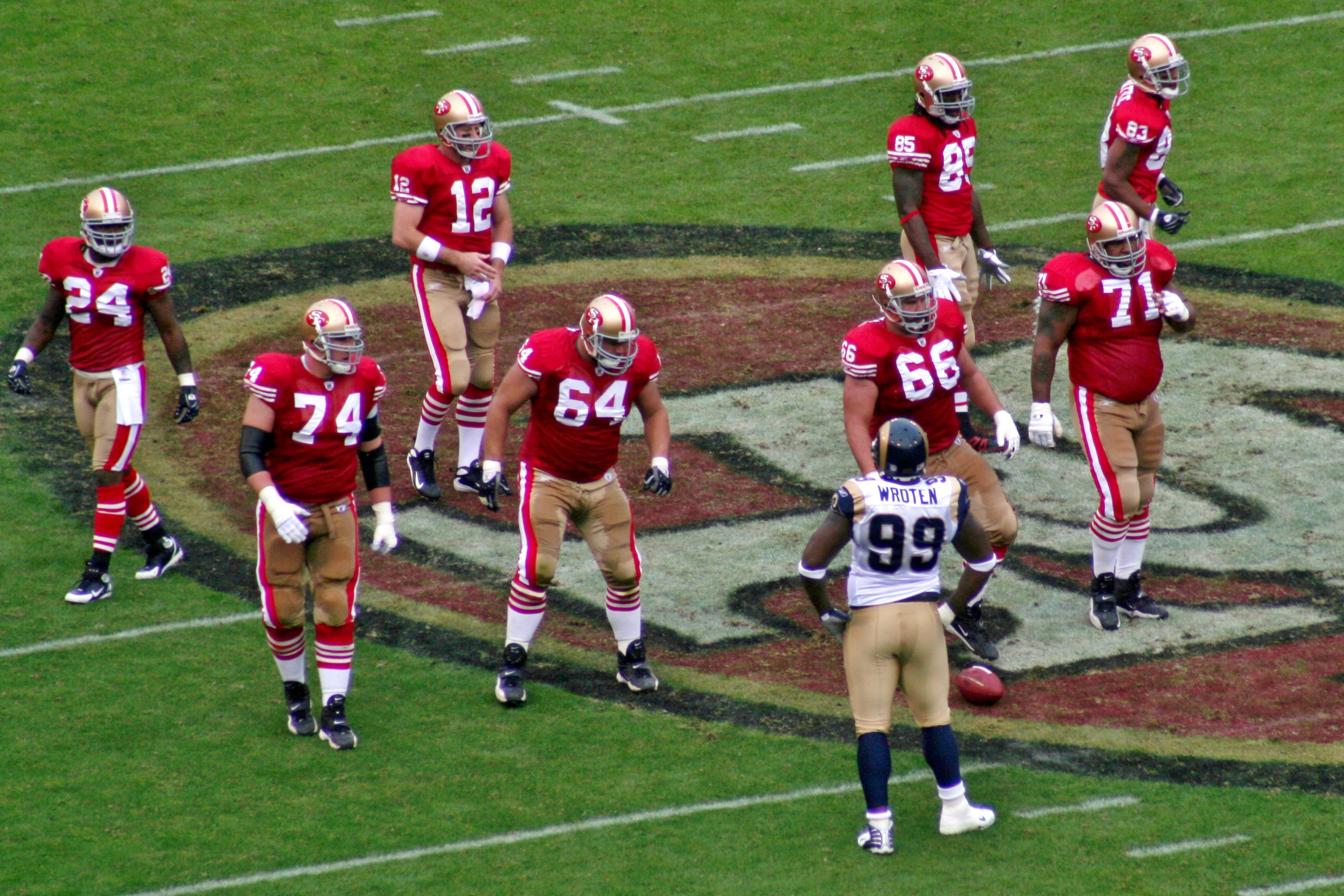
49ers offensive line sets up

==== Week 12: at Arizona Cardinals ====
Quarter	1	2	3	4	OT	Total
**49ers**	7	10	7	7	6	**37**
Cardinals	7	14	0	10	0	**31**

at University of Phoenix Stadium, Glendale, Arizona

- Game time: 4:15 p.m. EST/1:15 pm PDT
- Game weather: 65 °F (18 °C)
- Game attendance: 64,483
- Referee: Gerry Austin
- TV announcers (Fox): Ron Pitts (play-by-play) & Tony Boselli (color commentator)

Trying to snap an eight-game losing streak, the 49ers flew to the University of Phoenix Stadium for a Week 12 NFC West rematch with the Arizona Cardinals. In the first quarter, the Niners trailed early as Cardinals QB Kurt Warner completed a 28-yard TD pass to WR Larry Fitzgerald. San Francisco responded with QB Trent Dilfer completed a 2-yard TD pass to TE Vernon Davis. In the second quarter, the 49ers took the lead with kicker Joe Nedney getting a 19-yard field goal & RB Frank Gore getting an 11-yard TD run. However, Arizona regained the lead with RB Marcel Shipp getting a 1-yard TD run & Warner hooking up with Fitzgerald again on a 48-yard TD pass.

In the third quarter, the Niners retook the lead as Dilfer completed a 57-yard TD pass to WR Arnaz Battle for the only score of the period. In the fourth quarter, it was back-and-forth as Cardinals QB Tim Rattay (a former 49er) completed a 2-yard TD pass to TE Ben Patrick, while Gore managed to get a 35-yard TD run. Afterwards, Arizona ended regulation with kicker Neil Rackers getting a 19-yard field goal. In overtime, the ball went back and forth between the Cardinals and the 49ers. When the Cardinals had the ball, Kurt Warner threw the ball to WR Sean Morey who appeared to have a sure touchdown, but was run down by 49ers rookie linebacker Patrick Willis. Kicker Neil Rackers missed a field goal, and the 49ers got the ball back. After a three and out, punter Andy Lee pinned the Cardinals close to their own endzone. San Francisco lifted their demons with stripping Warner in his endzone and LB Tully Banta-Cain landed on it for the touchdown and the win.

With the win, not only did the 49ers improve to 3–8, it also snapped their dreaded eight-game losing streak. It also gave them a season-sweep over the Cardinals. It also improved their overtime record under head coach Mike Nolan to 3–0. With the victory, the 49ers improved to 2–0 against the Cardinals and 1–8 against everyone else this season.

==== Week 13: at Carolina Panthers ====
Quarter	1	2	3	4	Total
49ers	0	0	14	0	**14**
**Panthers**	3	14	7	7	**31**

at Bank of America Stadium, Charlotte, North Carolina

- Game time: 1:00 p.m. EST
- Game weather: 51 °F (11 °C) (Cloudy)
- Game attendance: 73,191
- Referee: Scott Green
- TV announcers (Fox): Matt Vasgersian (play-by-play) & J.C. Pearson (color commentator)

Coming off an impressive divisional road win over the Cardinals, the 49ers flew to Bank of America Stadium for a Week 13 intraconference game with the Carolina Panthers. In the first quarter, the Niners trailed early as Panthers kicker John Kasay nailing a 19-yard field goal for the only score of the period. In the second quarter, San Francisco continued to struggle as Carolina QB Vinny Testaverde completed a 5-yard to TE Dante Rosario, along with CB Richard Marshall returning an interception 67 yards for a touchdown.

In the third quarter, the Niners managed to get on the board with QB Trent Dilfer completing a 20-yard TD pass to WR Arnaz Battle and 21-yard TD pass to TE Delanie Walker. Afterwards, the Panthers replied with RB DeShaun Foster getting a 1-yard TD run. In the fourth quarter, Carolina sealed the win with Testaverde completing a 1-yard TD pass to TE Jeff King.

With the loss, not only did the 49ers drop to 3–9, it guaranteed them their fifth consecutive losing season since San Francisco's last playoff appearance in 2002.

==== Week 14: vs. Minnesota Vikings ====
Quarter	1	2	3	4	Total
**Vikings**	10	17	0	0	**27**
49ers	0	0	7	0	**7**

at Bill Walsh Field at Monster Park, San Francisco

- Game time: 4:05 p.m. EST/1:05 p.m. PDT
- Game weather: 56 °F (13 °C) (Sunny & Clear)
- Game attendance: 68,050
- Referee: Peter Morelli
- TV announcers (Fox): Matt Vasgersian (play-by-play) & J.C. Pearson (color commentator)

Hoping to rebound from their road loss to the Panthers, the 49ers went home for a Week 14 duel with the Minnesota Vikings. In the first quarter, the Niners trailed early as Vikings DT Kevin Williams returned an interception 18 yards for a touchdown, while kicker Ryan Longwell managed to get a 48-yard field goal. In the second quarter, Minnesota sealed the win early as QB Tarvaris Jackson completed a 19-yard TD pass to WR Robert Ferguson, Longwell nailing a 46-yard field goal, and RB Chester Taylor getting an 84-yard TD run. In the third quarter, San Francisco got their only score of the game as QB Shaun Hill completed a 5-yard TD pass to WR Arnaz Battle.

With the loss, the 49ers fell to 3–10. The only positive from the game was that the Niners held rookie RB phenom Adrian Peterson to just 3 rushing yards on 14 carries. Although, holding Adrian Peterson to just 3 yards and still losing the game is actually a negative.

Starting QB Trent Dilfer (7/19 for 45 yards and 1 interception) left the game in the second quarter with a head injury.

==== Week 15: vs. Cincinnati Bengals ====
Quarter	1	2	3	4	Total
Bengals	0	10	0	3	**13**
**49ers**	0	14	6	0	**20**

at Bill Walsh Field at Monster Park, San Francisco

- Game time: 8:00 pm EDT/5:00 pm PDT
- Game weather: 48 °F (9 °C) (Clear)
- Game attendance: 68,053
- Referee: Terry McAulay
- TV announcers (NFL Network): Bryant Gumbel (play-by-play), Marshall Faulk, & Deion Sanders (color commentators)

Trying to snap a two-game skid, the 49ers stayed at home for a Saturday night interconference battle with the Cincinnati Bengals. With QB Trent Dilfer out with an injury, back-up Shaun Hill made his first career start.

After a scoreless first quarter, the Niners drew first blood in the second quarter as Hill got a 3-yard TD run. However, the Bengals took the lead as kicker Shayne Graham made a 24-yard field goal, while QB Carson Palmer completed a 52-yard TD pass to WR Chris Henry. The Niners ended the half as Hill completed a 17-yard TD pass to TE Vernon Davis.

In the third quarter, San Francisco increased their lead with kicker Joe Nedney managing to get a 29-yard and a 38-yard field goal. In the fourth quarter, Cincinnati tried to mount a comeback as Graham kicked a 35-yard field goal. The Niners' defense held on for the victory.

With the win, the 49ers improved to 4–10. With the Rams' loss to the Packers, the Niners now sit in 3rd place in the NFC West.

==== Week 16: vs. Tampa Bay Buccaneers ====
Quarter	1	2	3	4	Total
Buccaneers	6	7	0	6	**19**
**49ers**	0	7	7	7	**21**

- Game weather: 55 °F (13 °C) (Sunny)
- Game attendance: 68,193
- TV announcers: (Fox) Dick Stockton, Brian Baldinger and Cara Capuano

Rolling with the momentum from the previous week's upset, the 49ers took on the playoff-bound Buccaneers as their final home game of the season, and of perennial pro-bowler Bryant Young's career.

The game came down to a matter of inches, as the Buccaneers final touchdown with 80 seconds remaining led to a failed 2-point attempt at a tying score; receiver Michael Clayton caught the pass in the back of the end zone but half of his foot came down out of bounds.

==== Week 17: at Cleveland Browns ====
Quarter	1	2	3	4	Total
**49ers**	0	7	0	0	**7**
**Browns**	7	10	0	3	**20**

- Game weather: 35 °F (2 °C) (Cold)
- Game attendance: 73,041
- Referee: Bill Carollo
- TV announcers: Matt Devlin and J.C. Pearson

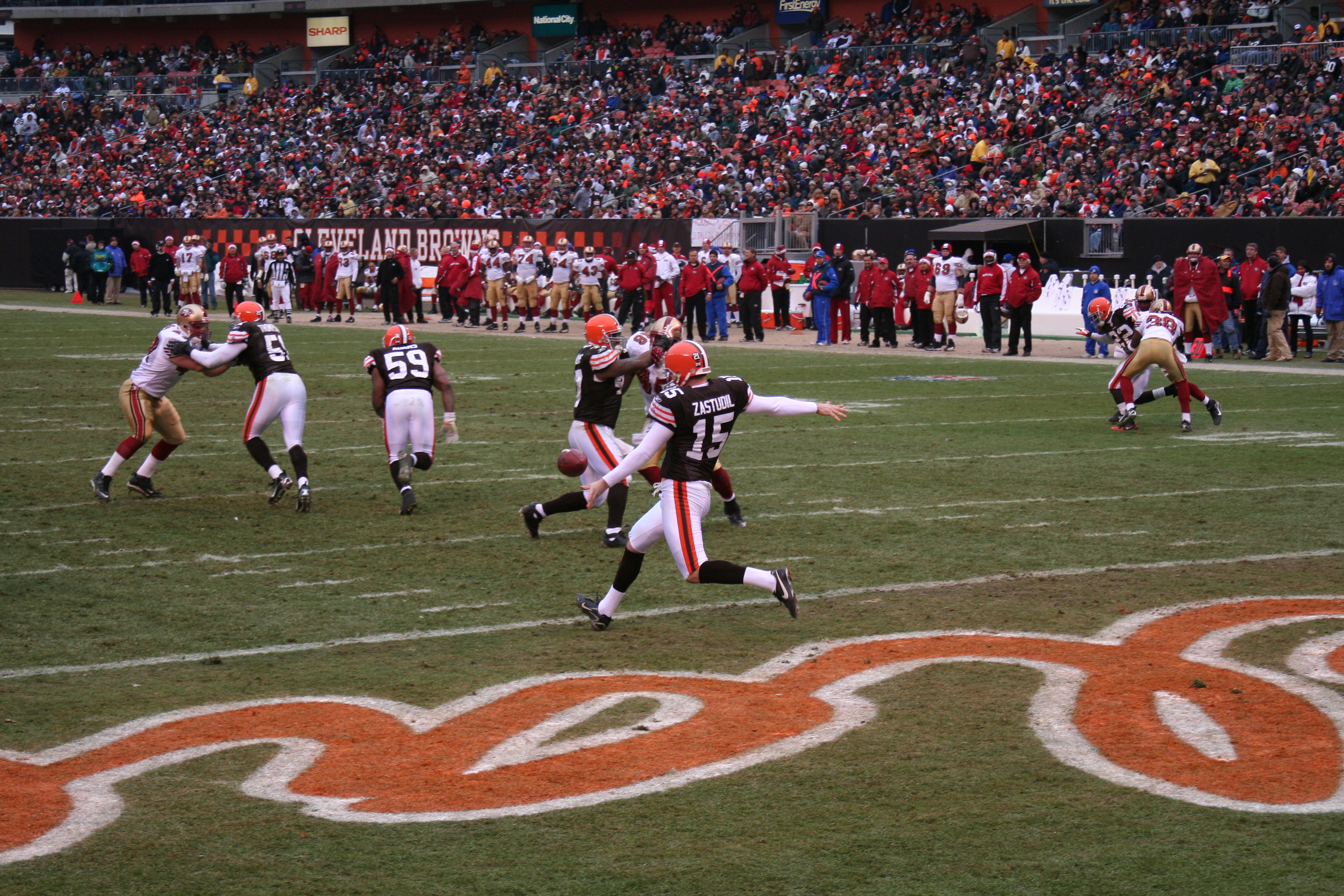
Browns punt, week 17

The 49ers finished the season with a loss, dropping to a final standings of 5–11.

The Browns became just the fifth team in history to miss the playoffs after coming away with 10 victories in the regular season.

The loss gave the 49ers the seventh pick in the 2008 NFL draft, which they owed to the New England Patriots.

=== Standings ===
NFC West
	W	L	T	PCT	DIV	CONF	PF	PA	STK
^{(3)} Seattle Seahawks	10	6	0	.625	5–1	8–4	393	291	L1
Arizona Cardinals	8	8	0	.500	3–3	5–7	404	399	W2
San Francisco 49ers	5	11	0	.313	3–3	4–8	219	364	L1
St. Louis Rams	3	13	0	.188	1–5	3–9	263	438	L4
