= Dildine =

Surname

Dildine is a surname. Notable people with the surname include:

- Joshua Dildine (born 1984), American artist
- Steve Dildine (born 1984), American football linebacker
