= Lancaster Museum of Art and History =

Museum of Art and History (MOAH)
- Established: 1986
- Location: 665 W. Lancaster Blvd; Lancaster, California
- Coordinates: 34.698271°N 118.141654°W
- Type: Art Museum
- Website: lancastermoah.org

The Lancaster Museum of Art and History (MOAH), is located in Lancaster, California. The museum's exhibits focus on post-war American art with an emphasis on California art. MOAH also preserves and exhibits historical artifacts from the Antelope Valley and offers exhibitions of local artists. At its current location, MOAH is an anchor of the BLVD, the community-focused development of Lancaster Blvd. Opened in 2012, the Museum consists of three floors and 20,000 square feet of programmable space. Special focus is given to exhibitions and engagement that connect relevant arts to the region's history, ranging from Native Americans and pioneers to aerospace.

== History ==
The original Lancaster Museum of Art and History (formerly known as the Lancaster Museum/Art Gallery or LMAG) was built in 1986 to provide residents with a venue for enjoying the works of local artists and showcasing the history of the Antelope Valley through its permanent collection of historical artifacts and records.

Acquisitions of art objects centered on early California landscape painting and figurative painting and objects of historical significance, including Native American artifacts, geological specimens and other artifacts related to the history of the Antelope Valley. The Museum's two locations reflected its twofold mission. During its first 24 years, the Museum's modest exhibition space for visual art was located on Sierra Highway not far from the new facility while a second location, the historically significant Western Hotel Museum, provided exhibition space for historical artifacts from the permanent collection.

In a public/private partnership between the City of Lancaster and InSite Development, the new Museum was relocated to a new building, acting as anchor for the revitalized downtown. In 2010, The City broke ground at the new site and in 2011 Lancaster City Council unanimously voted to change LMAG's name to the Lancaster Museum of Art and History (MOAH).

The Western Hotel site still houses historical artifacts from the permanent collection, while the new location, under manager and curator Andi Campognone's guidance, focuses on post-war American art with an emphasis on California art. MOAH continues to serve the local Antelope Valley arts community by offering exhibitions of local artists, and continuing to stage two major annual community-based exhibitions, the All-Media Juried Art Exhibition and the High School Art Exhibition.

== Collections and exhibitions ==
The collection includes works by artists Lisa Bartleson, Brad Howe, Eric Johnson, Thomas Pathe, Ann Marie Rousseau, Nike Schroeder and Eric Zammitt.

Other works acquired from 2012 to 2015 include Clayton Brothers, Gisela Colon, Joshua Dildine, Guy Dill, Andrew Frieder, Stevie Love, Thomas McGovern, Christopher Russell, David Ryan, Bradford J. Salamon, Andrew Schoultz. MOAH has also acquired works by street artists from and/or working in Southern California, including Cryptik, David Flores, Hueman, Teddy Kelly, and Aaron "woes" Martin.

MOAH's grand opening included exhibitions focused on the Antelope Valley and included a contemporary landscape painting show, an exhibit of artifacts from the Museum's permanent collection, and a solo exhibit by local artist Stevie Love. The headlining show, "Smooth Operations: Substance and Surface in Southern California Art," co-curated by Andi Campognone and art critic/historian Peter Frank examined the use of new and non-traditional materials in the fabrication of art objects, many of which came directly from the aerospace industry. Setting the tone for future exhibitions, "Smooth Operations" concentrated on the postwar years in and around Los Angeles, when experimentation with unorthodox materials and techniques led to the emergence of artistic movements such as “Finish Fetish” and “Light and Space.” Among the artists featured in Smooth Operations were Larry Bell, DeWain Valentine, Ronald Davis, Craig Kauffman, Judy Chicago, Roland Reiss, Norman Zammitt, Fred Eversley, VASA, Doug Edge, Terry O’Shea and Jerome Mahoney Other exhibitions have included Gary Lang, Jorg Dubin, and Tim Youd, as well as group shows.

== Green initiatives ==
To dovetail with the City of Lancaster's energy initiatives, MOAH staff developed the Green MOAH initiative in 2013, a creative program designed to better align Museum projects with the City's goal of 100% renewable energy usage by 2020. The Green MOAH initiative includes the award-winning Wasteland Project, STEAM inspired Crosswinds Project, Green Revolution Traveling Trunk, the 2016 Green Revolution exhibition and a youth summer think tank, presented in partnership with the Land Art Generator Initiative (LAGI).

== MOAH:CEDAR ==
In the fall of 2014, the renovated Cedar Center for the Arts reopened its doors with a new gallery space known as MOAH:CEDAR. The Cedar Center for the Arts has had a long history as a meeting place for local visual artists and performers. In 2015, MOAH:CEDAR dedicated the Andrew Frieder Creative Space, an open art studio free for public use and home to the Museum's monthly Young Artist Workshops, artist talks and professional development programming for adults. MOAH celebrated its first artist in residence in 2016 at MOAH:CEDAR, hosting artist Jane Ingram Allen, who led the community in the fabrication of the Eco-Quilt now installed at Forrest E. Hull Park.
