= Carlos Rivero =

Carlos Rivero may refer to:

- Carlos Rivero (baseball) (born 1988), Venezuelan ballplayer
- Carlos Rivero (footballer) (born 1992), Venezuelan footballer
- Carlos Rivero (musician), Argentine folk musician

== See also ==
- Rivero (surname)
- Carlos Rivera (disambiguation)
