= Robert Standish =

Robert Standish or Bob Standish may refer to:

- Robert Standish, pseudonym of English novelist Digby George Gerahty (1898–1981)
- Robert Standish (artist) (born 1964), American artist
- Bob Standish, fictional character in 1927 British drama film Poppies of Flanders
- Bob Standish, fictional character in 1950 American Western film Border Rangers
- Bob Standish, pseudonym of American comic book writer Richard E. Hughes (1909–1974)

== See also ==
- Robert Standish Sievier (1860–1939), British racehorse trainer
