= Bradford J. Salamon =

American painter

Bradford J. Salamon (born June 23, 1963) is an American multi-disciplinary artist who paints portraits in oils, depictions of human drama, and paintings of everyday objects. Salamon is also a sculptor, short filmmaker, curator and musician.

== Early life ==
Salamon was born in Los Angeles, California to a creative family. His father Joseph enjoyed painting, and his mother Mary Lou loved to write and play piano. His family moved to Newport Beach, CA when he was two. Salamon learned how to play the drums at 13; and he began performing in local nightclubs, schools and churches at 16 with different bands. When he was 18, he created the drawings for the album cover of his band, Idle Lovell, which was then signed to Blonde Vinyl Records. Salamon eventually performed in over a dozen rock and roll Bands, including Homes of Bones, in which he wrote original music, played guitar, and sang lead vocals.

== Art career ==
When his artistic talent became apparent, Salamon’s father began publishing charcoal drawings that Salamon was creating of celebrities and cultural icons. Within a few years, over 100 works were published and distributed to nationwide retailers such as Virgin Megastores and Tower Records.

In 1993, at the age of 30, Salamon's fascination with celebrities was waning, and he returned to school. In his mid-thirties, after graduating with a degree in art, and studying abroad, his journey led him back to portraiture. He began painting in oil, and was highly influenced by Lucian Freud and Alice Neel. From 1996 to 1999, Salamon was chosen as an official Grammy artist by The National Academy of Arts and Sciences.

In 2003, Salamon's solo show at Square Blue Gallery in Newport Beach, CA called "Orange County Tastemakers" was reviewed by many publications including ArtScene, Orange County Register and Riviera Magazine. The publication which accompanied the show called "Orange County Tastemakers" included essays by museum curators and prominent gallerists.

In 2011, Salamon focused on an old toy car left in his studio by one of his daughters. Using a new painting technique, he realized it was not just a still life that he had painted, but an actual portrait of an object. Pleased with the results, he began a new series of vintage object paintings that were exhibited in several West Coast galleries. Meanwhile, his interest in portraiture continued unabated.

After Bradford’s move to Los Angeles in 2009, he began painting many LA area artists, curators, and gallerists such as Don Bachardy, Andy Moses, Llyn Foulkes and Roland Reiss. A solo show of these portraits was held at 2016 at Launch Gallery in Los Angeles.

From 2006 - 2016, Salamon was an adjunct professor at Orange Coast College in Costa Mesa, CA and Coastline Community College in Newport Beach, CA, teaching painting from life, as well as conducting private workshops in his Los Angeles studio.

In 2011, Salamon began directing and producing short films about art, artists, gallerists, and critics. Each cinematic work is a record of how and where each artist works, his or her philosophy, and their own contributions to art.

In 2017, he began painting a series of everyday objects. These objects range from cheeseburgers to sunflower seeds, and place settings to rolls of toilet paper. About this time, Salamon began a series of sculptures using various mediums including concrete, liquid nails and other industrial materials.

In 2016, he curated a show called "Future Recollection" at Jamie Brooks Fine Art in Costa Mesa, CA. Artists in the show included Don Bachardy, Rebecca Campbell, Ray Turner (artist), and William Wray. In January 2019, Salamon curated a show entitled "Kitsch-In-Sync: Art and Its Opposite" at Coastline College Art Gallery in Newport Beach, CA. This show featured 47 artists, including Mark Ryden, Mark Kostabi and Kim Abeles.

In 2013, he had his first solo museum show, at the Lancaster Museum of Art, featuring his vintage object paintings. In 2014, Salamon was included in a group show at the Bakersfield Museum of Art (a 30-year survey of portraiture). In 2015, Salamon had a solo show at the Bakersfield Museum of Art highlighting his vintage objects. In 2016, he was the youngest artist in a group show titled "In the Land of Sunshine," which spanned nearly 200 years of California art at the Pasadena Museum of California Art. In 2017, he had two solo museum exhibitions at the Hilbert Museum of California Art at Chapman University; and he was spotlighted in a 30 year survey of his work at the California Heritage Museum in Santa Monica, CA. Salamon's work has recently been in auctions at the Crocker Art Museum in Sacramento, CA, the Laguna Art Museum in Laguna Beach, CA, the Catalina Island Museum in Avalon, CA (where his work set a new auction record) and auction houses including John Moran Auctioneers in Monrovia, CA. Also in 2019 was part of a group exhibit titled "Los Angeles Scene Paintings" at the Hilbert Museum of California Art in Orange, CA.

Salamon’s work is represented by Billis Williams Gallery Los Angeles, Sue Greenwood Fine Art in Laguna Beach, CA, Sullivan Goss in Santa Barbara, CA, Giacobbe-Fritz Fine Art in Santa Fe, NM, and Vault Gallery in Cambria, CA.

== Education ==
Salamon graduated from Edison High School in Huntington Beach, California, in 1981. He holds an Associate of Arts Degree from Orange Coast College, Costa Mesa California, and an Associate Degree for Transfer from Pasadena City College. He graduated summa cum laude with a Bachelor of Arts Degree from California State University, Los Angeles.
