= Rivero (surname) =

Rivero is a surname. Notable people with the surname include:

- Andrés Rivero Agüero (1905–1996), Cuban politician and prime minister
- Ángel Rivero Méndez (1856–1930), Puerto Rican soldier, writer, journalist, and businessman
- Antonio Rivero Taravillo (1963–2025), Spanish writer and poet
- Armando Rivero (born 1988), Cuban baseball player
- Bernardo Rivero (1889–1965), Peruvian painter
- Calu Rivero (born 1987), Argentine model and actress
- Carlos Rivero (disambiguation)
- Claudia Rivero (born 1986), Peruvian badminton player
- Claudio Rivero (born 1985), Uruguayan footballer
- Cristian Rivero (born 1978), Peruvian television host and actor
- Dante Rivero (born 1946), Filipino actor
- Diego Rivero (born 1981), Argentine football midfielder
- Diosbert Rivero (born 2000), Venezuelan footballer
- Domingo Rivero (1852–1929), Spanish poet
- Edmundo Rivero (1911–1986), Argentine musician
- Felipe Vázquez (born 1991), Venezuelan baseball pitcher, formerly known as Felipe Rivero
- Gabriela Rivero (born 1964), Mexican actress and singer
- Guillermo Rivero (1897–1950), Peruvian footballer and manager
- Horacio Rivero, Jr. (1910–2000), the first Puerto Rican and Hispanic four-star admiral in the U.S. Navy
- Ignacio Rivero (born 1992), Uruguayan footballer
- Inés Rivero (born 1975), Argentine model
- Jasiel Rivero (born 1993), Cuban basketball player
- Jennifer Ramírez Rivero (1978–2018), Venezuelan model and businesswoman
- Jorge Rivero (born 1938), Mexican actor
- José Rivero (born 1955), Spanish professional golfer
- José Ignacio Rivero (1920–2011), Cuban exile and journalist
- Juan A. Rivero (1923–2014), Puerto Rican biologist
- Juncal Rivero (born 1966), Spanish beauty queen, model and actress
- Lovely Rivero (born 1969), Filipino actress
- Mariano Eduardo de Rivero y Ustáriz (1798–1857), Peruvian scientist, mineralogist and diplomat
- Marita Rivero (born 1943), American media and non-profit executive
- Martín Rivero (born 1989), Argentine footballer
- Mirtha Rivero (born 1956), Venezuelan journalist and writer
- Octavio Rivero (born 1992), Uruguayan footballer
- Paulino Rivero (born 1952), Spanish politician
- Quique Rivero (born 1992), Spanish footballer
- Ramón Rivero (1909–1956), Puerto Rican comedian, actor, and composer
- Raúl Rivero (1945–2021), Cuban poet, journalist, and dissident
- Ricci Rivero (born 1998), Filipino basketball player
- Rolando Rivero Rivero (born 1944), Mexican politician
- Ronald Rivero (born 1980), Bolivian footballer
- Sebastián Rivero (born 1998), Venezuelan baseball player
- Toni Rivero (born 1988), Filipino taekwondo Olympian
- Viviana Rivero (born 1966), Argentine writer
