= RIVERA & RIVERA =

Contemporary art gallery in Los Angeles, California

Coordinates: 34.041786°N 118.263118°W

RIVERA & RIVERA is a contemporary art gallery in West Hollywood, California, owned by Carlos A. Rivera.

== History ==
The gallery opened in 2009 on the ground floor of the 1100 S. Hope Street building in Downtown Los Angeles. In 2011, the gallery moved to the West Hollywood Avenues of Arts & Design. Located on Robertson Boulevard, the gallery is housed in a two-story architectural space designed by Arata Isosaki. Erected in 1967, the space previously housed Rolling Stones Records, the Michael Kohn Gallery and most recently, the Earl McGrath Gallery.

== Artists ==
The gallery exhibits mid-career and established artists of international recognition and has prominently exhibited seminal installations and international projects of artists thereafter included in important exhibitions at the Museum of Contemporary Art, Los Angeles and the Pasadena Museum of California Art.

The gallery has helped foster the careers of influential contemporary artists, including Marquis Lewis (RETNA). In addition, the gallery has hosted a wide range of international exhibitions, from a survey of the Chicano influence on Latin Art including works from Carlos Almaraz, Frank Romero, The Date Farmers and Ismael Vargas to a survey of foreign and expatriate British artists including Tobias Keene and Pete Stern. In addition, the gallery has collaborated on the international exhibition of several urban artists, including Miles MacGregor (El Mac), Augustine Kofie, and Marquis Lewis (RETNA). The gallery has also hosted exhibits by Ray Turner.

== Notable exhibitions ==
- Se Habla Espanol (2010): A survey of Chicano influence on Latin American and urban art across three decades including works from Frank Romero, Ismael Vargas, Carlos Almaraz, The Date Farmers and Vincent Valdez. Less than six months after the exhibition, the Museum of Contemporary Art San Diego exhibited The Date Farmers in the landmark exhibition Viva La Revolucion: A Dialogue with the Urban Landscape. In 2012, Carlos Almaraz's widow, Elsa Almaraz, announced the Los Angeles County Museum of Art's plans to stage a travelling retrospective of Almaraz's work in late 2014.
- Street Legal (2009): A survey of Los Angeles street art including works from El Mac, Retna, Kofie and Mear One. Following its critical success in Los Angeles, the exhibition travelled to Basel, Switzerland in June 2010 and Amsterdam, the Netherlands in October 2010. In March 2011, the Museum of Contemporary in Art in Los Angeles announced Art in the Streets, the first major exhibition of the history of graffiti and street art; both RETNA and Mear One were chosen for the internationally lauded exhibition.
- Street Life (2011): A study of the origins of street art through the lens of prominent street culture photographers Greg Bojorquez, Ruediger Glatz, Keegan Gibbs, Estevan Oriol, Eriberto Oriol and Nick Farrell.
- RETNA (2010): A 4,500-square-foot (420 m^{2}) floor-to-ceiling installation.
- GoodManBadMan (2011): A solo show of American artist Ray Turner's portraits, curated by art critic Peter Frank. Turner's most recent exhibition before GoodManBadMan was a retrospective alongside of Wayne Thiebaud at the Pasadena Museum of California Art in 2010. The Turner exhibit, which inaugurated the West Hollywood location, was twelve years in the making and traveled directly to the Long Beach Museum of Art in June 2011, the Akron Art Museum in March 2012, and the Museum of Glass in November 2012.
- Ward of the State: Tony Ward, Artists' Muse (2011, Curated by Robert Standish): An exhibition centered on shared muse, male supermodel Tony Ward, by 17 artists including Herb Ritts, Christoph Schmidberger, Bruce Weber, Greg Gorman, Estevan Oriol, Robert Standish, Tony Ward, Patrick Hoelck, Patrick Martinez and Paul Rusconi. The exhibition opened on May 21 to critical acclaim from LA Weekly, Flavorpill, Flaunt Magazine and Curated Magazine. Less than six months after the exhibition, The J. Paul Getty Museum announced Herb Ritts: LA Style, a retrospective of the artist's extensive photographic career.
- anthro[physis] (2011): An exhibition centered on the evolving relationship between humans and their habitat. The exhibition featured works by Brazilian artist Néle Azevedo, Vaughn Bell, Robert Cannon, Israeli artist Aharon Gluska, Irish artist Claire Morgan, Robert Standish, British artist Jason deCaires Taylor, Dutch artist Levi van Veluw and Japanese artist Yuriko Yamaguchi.

== Press ==
Press articles about the gallery and its artists have been featured in Complex Magazine, The Financial Times, Bloomberg, The Huffington Post, The Economist, The Wall Street Journal, Juxtapoz Magazine, The Los Angeles Times, Artillery Magazine, Art News, The New Yorker, LA Weekly and Esquire.
