= Carlos Rivera (disambiguation) =

Carlos Rivera (born 1986) is a Mexican singer.

Carlos Rivera may also refer to:

- Carlos Rivera Aceves (born 1941), Mexican politician, governor of Jalisco in 1992–1995
- Carlos Rivera (baseball) (born 1978), Major League Baseball first baseman
- Carlos Rivera (basketball) (born 1983), Puerto Rican basketball player
- Carlos Rivera Jofré (fl. 1890s), Chilean politician, minister of war in 1894–1895
- Carlos Rivera (Mexican footballer) (born 1989), Mexican football attacking midfielder
- Carlos Rivera (Panamanian footballer) (born 1979), Panamanian football defender
- Carlos Rivera (politician) (born 1950s), Spanish mayor
- Carlos A. Rivera (born 1987), Argentinian art dealer
- Carlos M. Rivera (1934–2020), American public official, 27th fire commissioner of New York City
- Carlos Manuel Rivera (born 1978), American boxer
- Carlos Rafael Rivera (born 1970), American composer
- Charlie Rivera (baseball) (Carlos Lavezzari Rivera, 1911–2003), Puerto Rican baseball player
- Charlie Masso (Carlos Javier Rivera Massó, born 1969), Puerto Rican singer and actor
- Carlos Rivera, a character in the TV drama 7th Heaven
- Carlos Rivera, a character in the manga and anime Ashita no Joe

== See also ==
- Carlos Rivero (disambiguation)
