= Eric Johnson (sculptor) =

Los Angeles sculptor (born 1949)

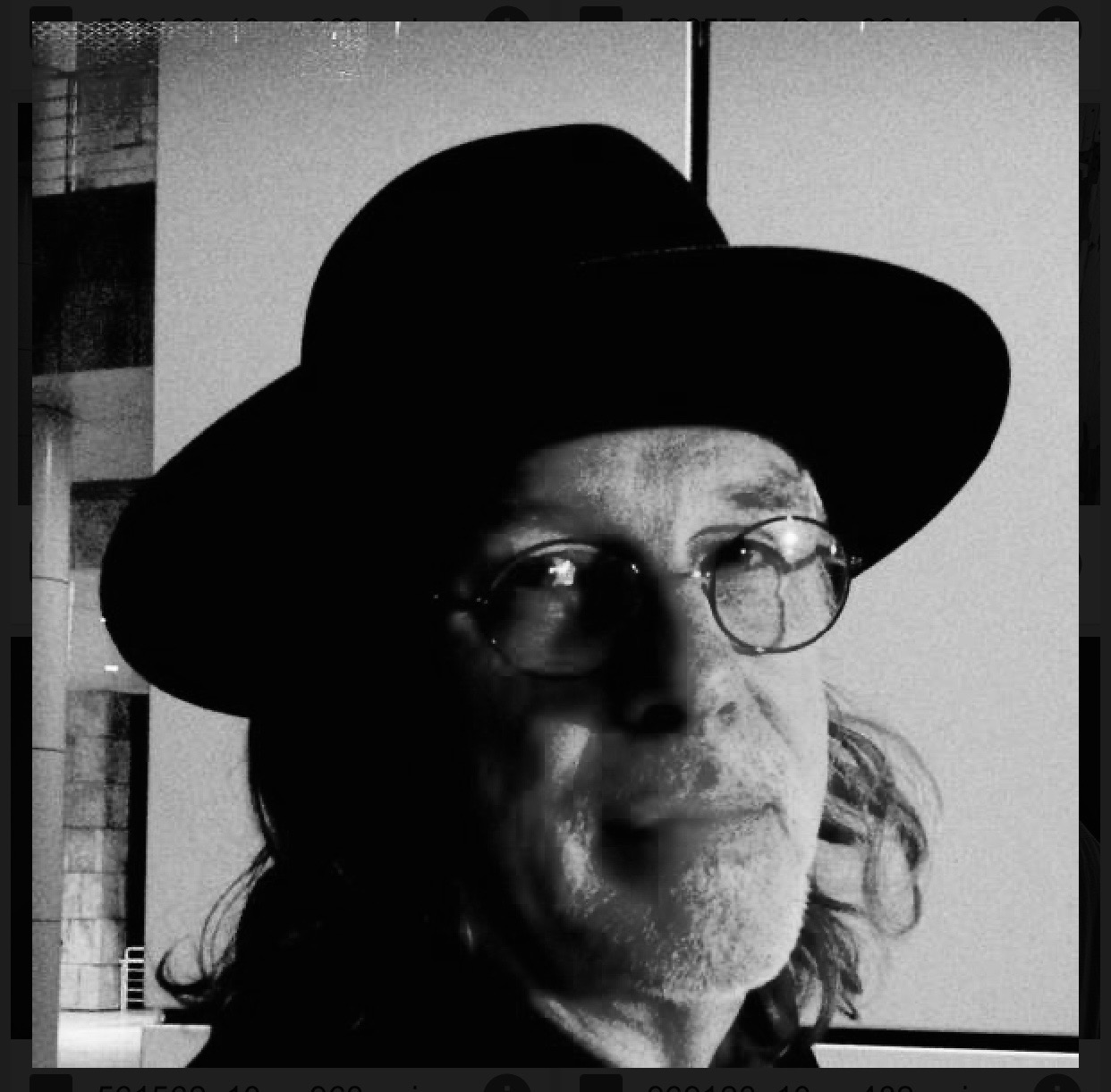
- Eric Johnson, sculptor, San Pedro, California
- Born: 1949; Burbank, California, U.S.
- Known for: Sculpture
- Movement: Post-minimalism
- Website: ericjohnsonstudio.com

Eric Johnson (born 1949) is an American sculptor.

Johnson is known for pieces crafted from wood, fiberglass and resin with a "sleek and smooth" finish. Many of them are inspired by scientific images, with titles like Watson's Wand, Reimann's Redundant Collapse and Hawking's Holes, referring to the discovery of DNA structure by Watson and Crick, the mathematics of Bernhard Riemann in the General Theory of Relativity and descriptions of black holes by Stephen Hawking.

Johnson's work is associated with Post-Minimalist movement, which eschews the minimalist insistence on closed, geometric forms in favor of more open forms. Much of his past work was influenced by the Finish Fetish style, which achieves sensuous colors and pristine surfaces by using resins, automotive paint, plastics, and fabrication processes adapted from the industrial world.

== Early life and education ==
Johnson was raised in Burbank in the San Fernando Valley, some 15 miles from downtown Los Angeles. He attended Los Angeles Valley College, then California Institute of the Arts, and received his Master of Fine Arts degree from University of California at Irvine, graduating summa cum laude. After graduation, he became a studio assistant to Tony DeLap and later to and Craig Kauffman

He has lived and worked in San Pedro, California since 1996.

== Criticism and commentary ==
Art critic Leah Ollman, writing in The Los Angeles Times, has described Johnson's composite resin and wood sculptures as "sleek and smart", comparing their forms to those of Brancusi, and mimicking the "geometries underlying space, time and forms of life."

Writing in Artweek, Neil Kendricks described Johnson's works as "coldly sensuous" despite their aesthetically pleasing arrangement of forms. He goes on to say that "the work doesn't just rest on a formal idea of icy, detached beauty" and notes that each sculpture holds space as though "marking the territory of an absent human presence."

Art critic Roberta Carasso paid tribute to the scientific inspiration for these works, saying, "With resins that originated in the aerospace and automotive industries, Johnson attempts to portray galactic concepts – parallel universe, redundant collapse, and black holes."

Artist and writer Kay Whitney said in Sculpture Magazine that Johnson's "materials—with their constant contrasting of the organic and the synthetic, their cycling through transparency/opacity—create a space of tension between visible and invisible. The play between what’s perceived and what’s concealed gives the objects a tactile embodied richness."

== Exhibitions ==
In 1999, Johnson's work was part of a four person show at the Angels Gate Cultural Center, San Pedro, CA, titled, Material Men: The Medium is the Message.

In 2023, Johnson had a one-person show titled, Madame X, at the William Turner Gallery, Santa Monica, CA

His work was exhibited in a two-person exhibition in 2017, Eric Johnson and Peter Lodato, and in 2024 in the Light Matter: Art & Science Collide, show, both of which were held at the William Turner Gallery, Santa Monica, CA

In 2025, his work was included in the group exhibition, Moment of Perception, at King Studio, Venice, CA, and in the same year, in Beneath a Shared Sky, at the Korean Cultural Center, Los Angeles, CA

== Public collections ==
Johnson’s work is held in public collections, including:

- Oakland Museum of California, Oakland, California;
- Laguna Art Museum, Laguna Beach, California;
- Lancaster Museum of Art and History, Lancaster, California

== Awards and citations ==
- 1996 Gottlieb Foundation Individual Support Grant
- 1996 “Artist Beyond Disabilities” 1st Place, Long Beach, CA
