= Tarancón (band) =

Brazilian folk band

- Origin: São Paulo, Brazil
- Genres: Folk; nueva canción
- Years active: 1972–present
- Label: Tam-Tam Media

Tarancón are a Brazilian folk band formed in São Paulo in 1972. Known for their close alignment with the Latin American nueva canción movement, the group blended traditional Latin American and Brazilian musical elements to create a hybrid sound that emphasized cultural integration and political engagement. Over the course of their career, the band recorded nine albums and was particularly influential among leftist student and labor movements during Brazil's military dictatorship. The name Tarancón was reportedly inspired by a coal mine in Asturias, Spain, which collapsed and resulted in the deaths of eleven workers, and the band adopted the name in reference to this tragedy.

== History ==
Formed in 1972 in the city of São Paulo, Tarancón emerged during a period of political repression in Brazil, establishing itself within circles aligned with the student movement and the broader resistance to the military regime. The band was composed primarily of four Brazilian musicians, including Jair do Nascimento (Jica) and Sérgio Feres, who were part of its most emblematic phase. The group reflected a strong identification with Latin American solidarity and anti-authoritarian ideals.

Their early performances and recordings gained popularity within academic and political environments, particularly as their music resonated with progressive sectors of Brazilian society. Tarancón frequently performed at union rallies and student events, contributing to the cultural dimension of Brazil’s political opening in the late 1970s and early 1980s.

== Artistry ==
Tarancón's artistry was grounded in the Latin American music and folk songbooks, particularly the nueva canción tradition associated with artists such as Violeta Parra, Victor Jara, and Atahualpa Yupanqui. Many of their early songs were performed in Spanish and featured typical Latin American acoustic instruments, including the charango, quena, zampoña, and bombo legüero. The band aimed to legitimize Brazil's cultural belonging within Latin America by fusing musical elements from across the continent with those of Brazilian regional and popular music.

== Discography ==
- Gracias a La Vida (1976)
- Lo único que Tengo (1978)
- Rever Minha Terra (1979)
- Bom Dia (1981)
- Ao vivo (1982)
- Amazona Vingadora (1985)
- Terra Canabis (1986)
- Mama Hue (1988)
- Graças a La Vita (1992 re-impressão)
- Vuelvo para Vivir (1997)
- Seleção de Ouro (2000)
