= Carlos A. Rivera =

Argentine art dealer

- Born: Carlos Andrés Rivera; July 3, 1987 (age 38); Buenos Aires, Argentina
- Education: University of Southern California
- Known for: Contemporary art

Carlos A. Rivera (born July 3, 1987) is an Argentine art dealer based in Los Angeles, California. He is a graduate of the University of Southern California's School of Cinematic Arts and the Marshall School of Business. He founded RIVERA & RIVERA, a contemporary art gallery headquartered in West Hollywood, California, at the age of 22. He closed the gallery in December 2012 to head an emerging art fund. Inspired by algorithmic trading, Rivera brought on a financial engineer and data scientist to model the trajectory of emerging artists. After the fund's horizon, Rivera began publicly publishing the results of the emerging art algorithm on a website first branded as SellYouLater and shortly thereafter relaunched as ArtRank.

== Career ==
In the years 2009, 2010 and 2011, Rivera, his gallery, and its represented artists were featured in the Los Angeles Times, New York Magazine, USA Today, Associated Press, Juxtapoz, Esquire Magazine, Complex Magazine, The Economist, Variety, Financial Times, Bloomberg, NPR, The Huffington Post, and Wired Magazine.

In the years 2014 and 2015, Rivera and ArtRank have been featured in The New York Times, The Financial Times, The Guardian, Artforum, ARTnews, ArtReview, and named to the Art+Auction Power 100.
