= Ray Turner (artist) =

American artist

- Born: 1958 (age 67–68)
- Education: Art Center College of Design (BFA)
- Occupation: artist
- Known for: portrait and landscape paintings

Ray Turner (born in 1958), is an American artist known primarily for his portrait and landscape paintings. Turner lives and works in Pasadena, California. He received his BFA from Art Center College of Design in 1985 where he subsequently taught for 13 years as a professor of painting and drawing.

== Work ==
Turner's work has been exhibited regularly in the United States since 1990. In 2010, his paintings were shown at the Pasadena Museum of California Art alongside those of Wayne Thiebaud. In 2011, Turner had solo shows at Rivera & Rivera and the Long Beach Museum of Art. After Long Beach, the exhibition Population traveled to the Akron Art Museum (OH), Whatcom Museum (Bellingham, WA), Tacoma Museum of Glass (WA), Alexandria Museum of Art (VA), Wichita Art Museum (KS), Huntington Museum of Art (WV), and Missoula Art Museum (MT). Population is a traveling exhibit of over 900 pieces. It has been reviewed and written about by several notable critics and historians such as Peter Frank, art historian and critic, Ken Baker, San Francisco Chronicle, and Michael Upchurch, Seattle Times.

Turner's Population exhibition was listed in the Huffington Post as one of the top shows to see in March 2011 and was positively reviewed in July 2011 by notable Art Critic, Edward Goldman.

Works by Turner are included in several public collections, including Los Fuentes Building, Crown City Building, Park Place Building, and Maguire Building. He is in the permanent collections of Akron Museum of Art, Whatcom Museum, Museum of Glass, Wichita Art Museum, Long Beach Museum of Art, and the Huntington Museum.
