= Joshua Dildine =

By Firth Froth by Joshua Dildine, 2015, Honolulu Museum of Art

Joshua Dildine (born 1984) is an American artist who was born in Mission Viejo, California. He received a BA from Pepperdine University in 2007 and an MFA in Studio Art from Claremont Graduate University in 2010.

Dildine is best known for his works that combine post-modern painterly abstraction with family photographs. By Firth Froth, in the collection of the Honolulu Museum of Art, is an example of the artist's approach to mixed media. The Frederick Weisman Museum of Fine Art (Malibu, California), the Honolulu Museum of Art, the Lancaster Museum of Art and History (MOAH) (Lancaster, CA) and the Sweeney Art Gallery (University of California, Riverside) are among the public collections holding works by Joshua Dildine.
