= Marita Rivero =

American media and non-profit executive (born 1943)

- Born: November 25, 1943 (age 82)

Marita Rivero is a media and non-profit executive. She is the executive director of the Museum of African American History, Boston and the former vice president and general manager of WGBH-TV and WGBH (FM).

== Early life and education ==
Rivero was born November 25, 1943 in West Grove, Pennsylvania. She attended Tufts University in Medford and earned a degree in psychology in 1964.

== Career ==
In 1970, Rivero began her career as a producer at WGBH, a National Public Radio member station in Boston, Massachusetts. She later moved to Washington, D.C., where she worked for PBS, the National Science Foundation, and the Communications Task Force of the United States Congressional Black Caucus. Rivero subsequently returned to radio, serving as manager and later vice president of WPFW Pacifica in Washington, D.C.

In 1988, Rivero returned to Boston to become general manager of WGBH Radio. She served as executive-in-charge of the multimedia project Africans in America: America's Journey Through Slavery, which received Peabody and Emmy awards. In 2005, she was appointed general manager for radio and television at WGBH, a role in which she also held vice-presidential duties. Rivero was the first woman and first African-American to serve as general manager of WGBH-TV. She stepped down from this position in 2013 and was succeeded by Liz Cheng for television and Phil Redo for radio. She stepped down from the role in 2013. She was succeeded by Liz Cheng for television and Phil Redo for radio.

In 2012, Rivero became Chair of the Board of Trustees for Bunker Hill Community College in Boston. In 2015, she was appointed executive director of the Museum of African American History in Boston and Nantucket, an institution she had supported since the late 1980s and chaired from 1999 to 2009. Early in her tenure as executive director, Rivero oversaw the opening of the exhibit Picturing Frederick Douglass, focused on documentary photography of Frederick Douglass.

Rivero was the first person of color to chair the Board of Trustees for the National Trust for Historical Preservation. She is one of eleven women on the Advisory Council for the African American Cultural Heritage Action fund, including Phylicia Rashad, Dr. Evelyn Brooks Higginbotham and Mtamanika Youngblood.

== Awards and recognition ==
Rivero was honored with several awards including a 2007 Pinnacle Award for Achievement in Arts & Education from the Greater Boston Chamber of Commerce; the first Image Award for Vision and Excellence from Women in Film and Video/New England; and induction into the YWCA's Academy of Women Achievers. Rivero received the 2021 Codman Lifetime Achievement from the Boston Preservation Alliance. She currently serves as a board director for NPR.

In 2023, she was recognized as one of "Boston’s most admired, beloved, and successful Black Women leaders" by the Black Women Lead project.
