= Robert Standish (artist) =

American artist (born 1964)

Robert Standish (born September 18, 1964, Los Angeles, California) is an American artist.

== Education ==
Standish earned a Bachelor of Arts degree in psychology from Antioch University in 1996.

== Exhibitions ==
After presenting three new Standish works in a Los Angeles group show at Lemon Sky Projects + Editions in 2002, the gallery would provide the artist with his first solo exhibition Robert Standish: Recent Paintings later that year.

Standish's artworks have been exhibited in numerous commercial galleries and museums, including the Carnegie Art Museum, Crocker Art Museum, Frederick R. Weisman Museum of Art in California, Laguna Art Museum, a dual show with the work of painter Sam Francis at Martin Lawrence Galleries, and a solo exhibition at the Lancaster Museum of Art and History.

== Public works ==
Standish has created public works in the greater Los Angeles area, including Culver City Mural in the summer of 2012 on the face of a commercial building located on Washington Boulevard and Landmark Street in Culver City, California. The mural features "two cat-like shaped eyes filled in with the spectrum colors of the rainbow. It was meant to symbolize the wisdom of seeing the world with gratitude and joy," explained Standish in the short film Robert Standish: Departures, directed by Eric Minh Swenson. Swensen wrote about the process of filming the creation of the mural in the August 31, 2012, issue of HuffPost.

== Press ==
The Robert Standish: Recent Paintings solo exhibition at Lemon Sky Projects + Editions garnered the artist favorable reviews in 2002 including one in the July–September edition of FlashArt written by Clayton Campbell. The artist and his works were later profiled by Matthew Newton in the March 2008 issue of Juxtapoz Art & Culture Magazine, the November 2014 issue of Los Angeles Confidential written by Jen Jones Donatelli, the March 2018 quarterly magazine Design LA published by the Los Angeles Times written by Kelly Vencill Sanchez, the July–August 2006 issue of Modern Luxury Angeleno Magazine, the article "Violations of Sight" in the 2008 issue of Flaunt Magazine and the article "Una residenza modernista dall' anima romantic" in the June 2021 issue of Architectural Digest (Italy) written by Elisa Mencarelli.

Standish's October–December 2008 solo exhibition Robert Standish: Street/Lights at Carrie Secrist Gallery in Chicago, Illinois earned the artist a largely positive review from critic Alan G. Artner in the Chicago Tribune on November 14 of that year noting that, "Standish's use of logos suggests ironic social commentary, as if, say, Nike or Citibank were 'sponsors' of his street people. It's an oddity one puts up with for the sake of his dazed, tremulous nocturnal vision."

An interview with Standish in the April 23, 2018, issue of Voyage LA provided some insight in the artist's motivation for his work. Standish stated plainly, "I'm in awe of the creative force all around us. I can’t think of anything that's so strikingly omnipresent. Every square inch of our physical universe and all existing life forms contain the elements of shape, texture, pattern, color – and all of it comes from a process of creation. Painting for me is the opportunity to deeply enjoy and directly connect with that force – and hopefully inspire others with the rewards of connecting to its power and beauty."

Another Interview with Standish in the June 23, 2023, LA Weekly column Meet an Artist by Shana Nys Dambrot provided a one-word response to her question, "What is your short answer to people who ask what your work is about?" Standish: "Transcendence." The author refers to Standish's abstract work as "transcendent expressionism."

In a review of simultaneous solo commercial exhibitions at two Martin Lawrence Galleries locations in New York City and San Francisco, artist and critic Stephen Wozniak described Standish's work in relation to early Abstract Expressionism painting in the May 2023 issue of Whitehot Magazine of Contemporary Art, "Many works in the show, such as the circular, acrylic-on-panel Crimson Kismet, offer rich, rolling, textural reveals that show viewers the numerous color-saturated paint layers Standish has laid down before unearthing each into repeated palette-knived patterns that seem to flower and fold above and beneath the ground. It is an ‘overall’ work among others that, in the words of Jackson Pollock, '…do not have a center, but depend on the same amount of interest throughout.'"

== Use of images ==
Several of Standish’s paintings have been featured on the cover or inside of numerous notable international magazines, including the November 2008 issue of Flaunt (No. 98), featuring motion picture actor Gabriel Garcia Bernal; the March 2022 issue of Vogue India, the June 2023 issue of Playboy (Africa) and the December 2021 issue of Harper’s Bazaar (Vietnam), among others.

== Collections ==
Standish’s artworks are held in numerous private and public institutional collections, including those of Dan Fauci, Susan and Lewis Manilow, The Fredrick R. Weisman Art Foundation, Louis K. Meisel, Larry Fields, Alan Turner, Howard A. Tullman, Patricia Arquette, the Nora Eccles Harrison Museum of Art, the Crocker Museum of Art, JPMorgan Chase & Co. and the Los Angeles County Museum of Art.

== Representation ==
Standish is represented by commercial galleries Mark Moore Fine art in Orange, California and Martin Lawrence Galleries, which features eight locations across the United States. Standish was previously represented Shoshana Wayne Gallery in Santa Monica, California.
