= Jim Hostler =

American football coach (born 1966)

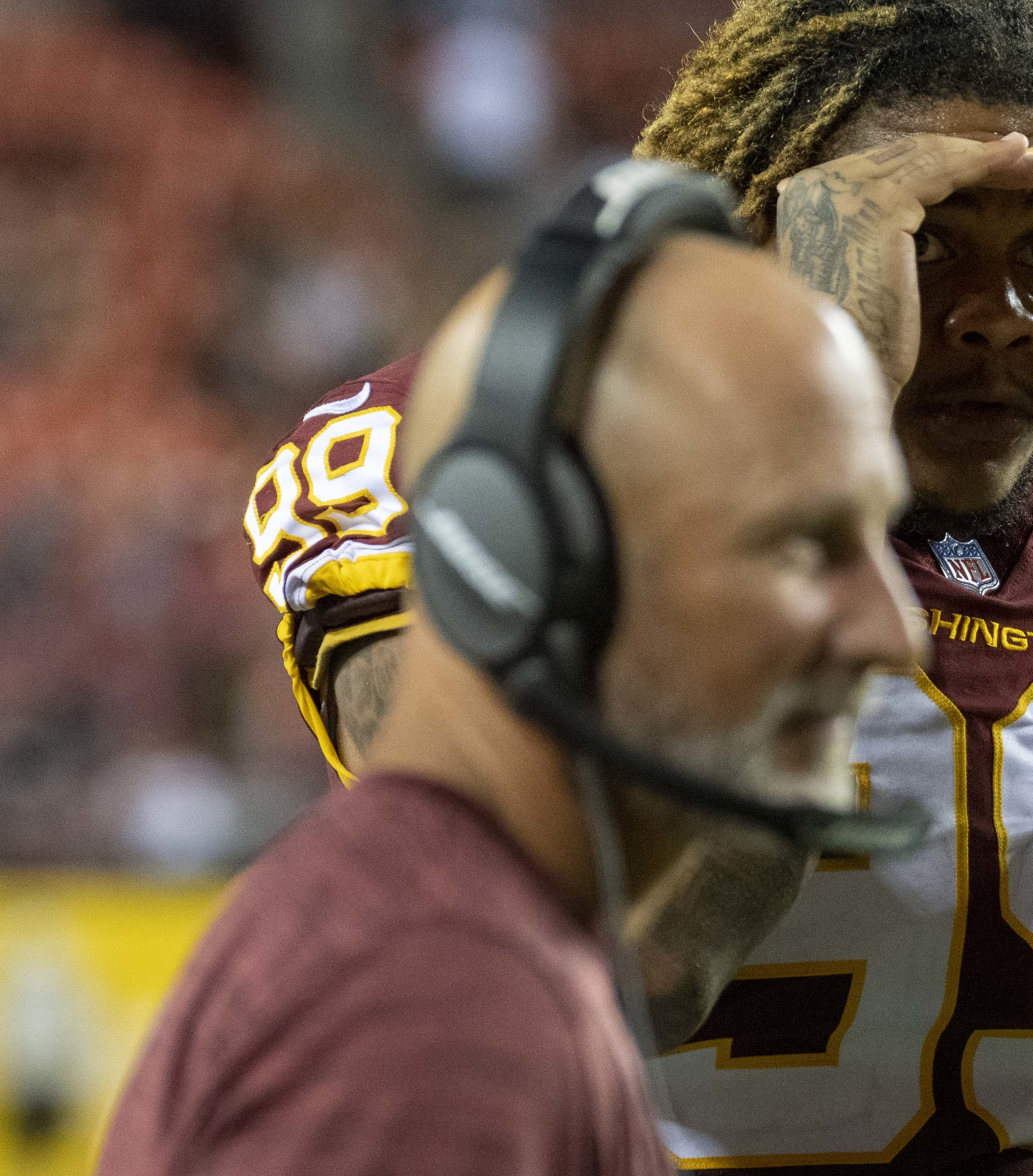
- Hostler in 2021

Personal information
- Born: November 11, 1966 (age 59); Pittsburgh, Pennsylvania, U.S.

Career information
- College: IUP

Career history
- IUP (1990–1992) Running backs coach; Juniata College (1993) Offensive coordinator; IUP (1994–1996) Wide receivers coach; IUP (1997–1998) Linebackers coach; IUP (1999) Offensive coordinator; Kansas City Chiefs (2000) Offensive quality control coach; New Orleans Saints (2001–2002) Assistant wide receivers coach; New York Jets (2003) Quarterbacks coach; New York Jets (2004) Wide receivers coach; San Francisco 49ers (2005–2006) Quarterbacks coach; San Francisco 49ers (2007) Offensive coordinator; Baltimore Ravens (2008–2013) Wide receivers coach; Buffalo Bills (2014) Senior offensive assistant; Indianapolis Colts (2015) Wide receivers coach; Indianapolis Colts (2016–2017) Tight ends coach; Green Bay Packers (2018) Passing game coordinator; Carolina Panthers (2019) Wide receivers coach; Washington Football Team (2020) Wide receivers coach; Washington Football Team / Commanders (2021–2022) Senior offensive assistant; Detroit Lions (2023) Senior offensive assistant; USC (2024) Defensive analyst

Awards and highlights
- Super Bowl champion (XLVII)
- Coaching profile at Pro Football Reference

Jim Hostler (born November 11, 1966) is an American football coach. Most of his career has been in various offensive coaching roles in the National Football League (NFL).

== Career ==
He was one of several Carolina Panthers coaches to move to Washington after the 2019 season. He also was the offensive coordinator of the San Francisco 49ers in 2007. He spent the 2005 and 2006 seasons as the 49ers' quarterbacks coach. As a member of the Baltimore Ravens' coaching staff, Hostler won his first Super Bowl title when the team defeated the San Francisco 49ers in Super Bowl XLVII. He had previously served on the staffs of the New York Jets, the New Orleans Saints, and the Kansas City Chiefs. Prior to coaching in the NFL, Hostler spent nine seasons coaching at Indiana University of Pennsylvania (IUP), his alma mater, where he had played cornerback for four seasons.

In February 2023, after spending the past three seasons on the team's staff, Hostler and the Washington Commanders agreed to part ways. He joined the Detroit Lions as a senior offensive assistant for the 2023 season.

On May 9, 2024, Hostler was reportedly hired as a defensive analyst at USC.
