= Carlos Rivero (musician) =

Argentine author and musician

Musician Carlos Rivero

Carlos Rivero is an Argentine author and composer, musician and music teacher, born in San Juan. He developed an intensive professional career as a folk percussion performer.

Specialized in Argentine folk music, he toured, played and recorded with many artists and groups, such as Manolo Juárez, Suna Rocha, Jaime Torres, Leda Valladares, Jairo, Facundo Saravia, Los Andariegos, and Los Chalchareros, among many others.

Rivero has composed Chamber Works for Percussion, being one of them Hunuc Huar (for flute, cello and percussion), the premiere of which took place at the Auditorium LRA Radio Nacional.

In 1995 he received a Trimarg Award, granted by the Argentine Music Committee of UNESCO, in the genre "Folk Projection".

In 2002 he was granted the National Fellowship in Folk Expressions by the National Arts Fund (Fondo Nacional de las Artes). In 2004 Carlos Rivero published his book: Bombo Legüero and Argentine Folk Percussion.

He played at the Mar del Plata San Martín Theatre (Sala Martín Coronado) as part of the "Mar del Jazz" Festival with Greek guitar player, Andreas Geogiu, and Brazilian percussionist Eliezér Freitas Santos. He has also recorded with bass player César Franov and guitarist Quique Sinessi; the trio toured around the country.

Rivero formed part of the Ethnic Percussion Trio with Marcelo García and Facundo Guevara, and he has also performed in a duet together with the guitar player José Salussi. He covered the well-known Argentine rock band Divididos during a concert in Sarmiento Park (Córdoba) and also contributed with the band Bersuit Vergarabat for their album, La Argentinidad al Palo. With this group, he performed at concerts held in the River Plate Stadium and the Luna Park.

Since 1987, Carlos Rivero works as a full-time professor of folklore at the School of Popular Music of Avellaneda. He also gives clinics and lectures on Musical Language Appreciation, Bombo legüero and Argentine Folk Percussion all over the country.
