= Vasa, Rajasthan =

Vasa or Wasa Vasantpur, Vasantgarh
- Village
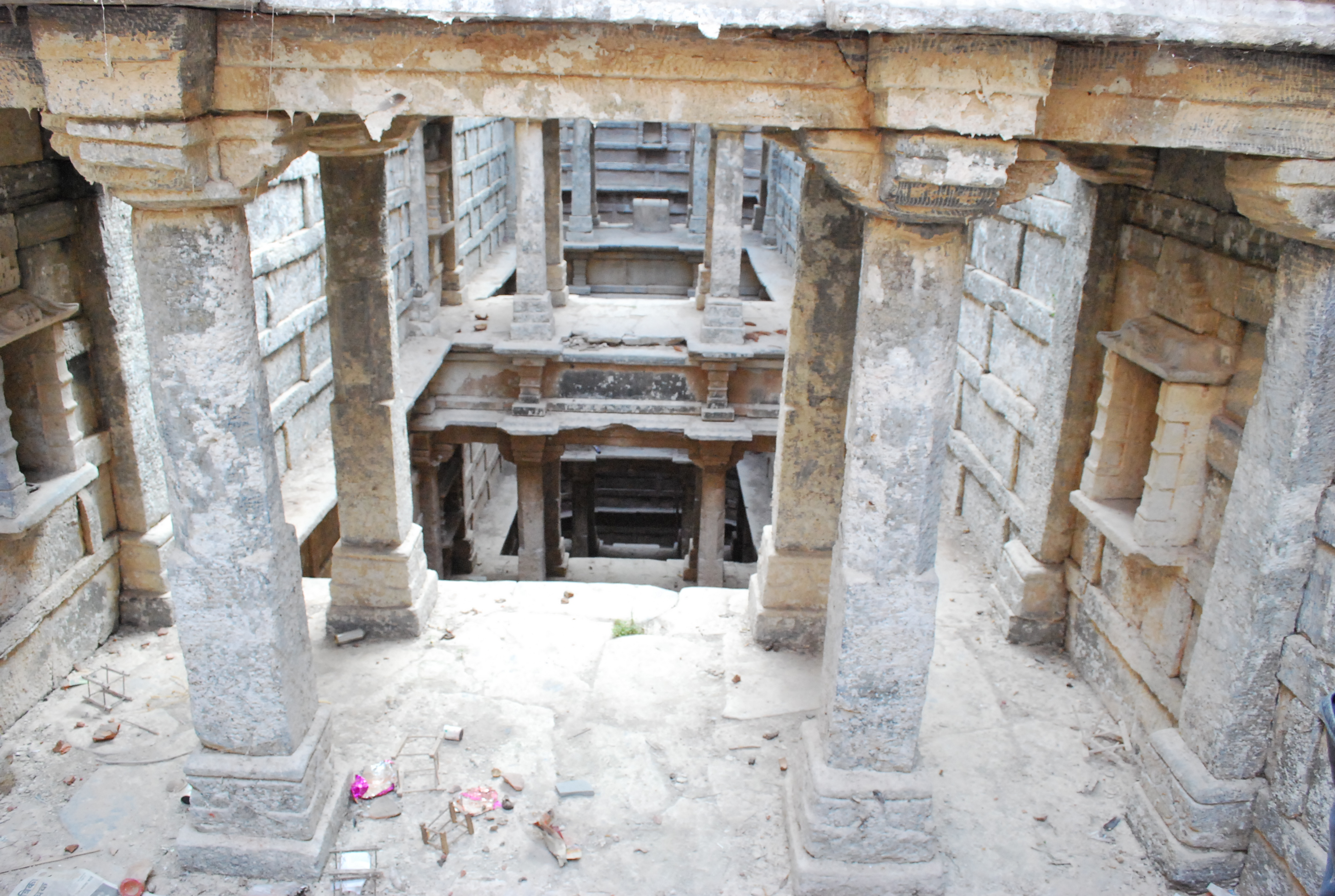
- Country: India
- State: Rajasthan
- District: Sirohi

Population (2001)
  - Total: 8,676

Languages
  - Official: Hindi
- Time zone: UTC+5:30 (IST)
- PIN: 307024
- Telephone code: 02971
- ISO 3166 code: RJ-IN
- Vehicle registration: RJ-38-
- Nearest city: Abu Road
- Lok Sabha constituency: Jalore
- Vidhan Sabha constituency: Pindwada

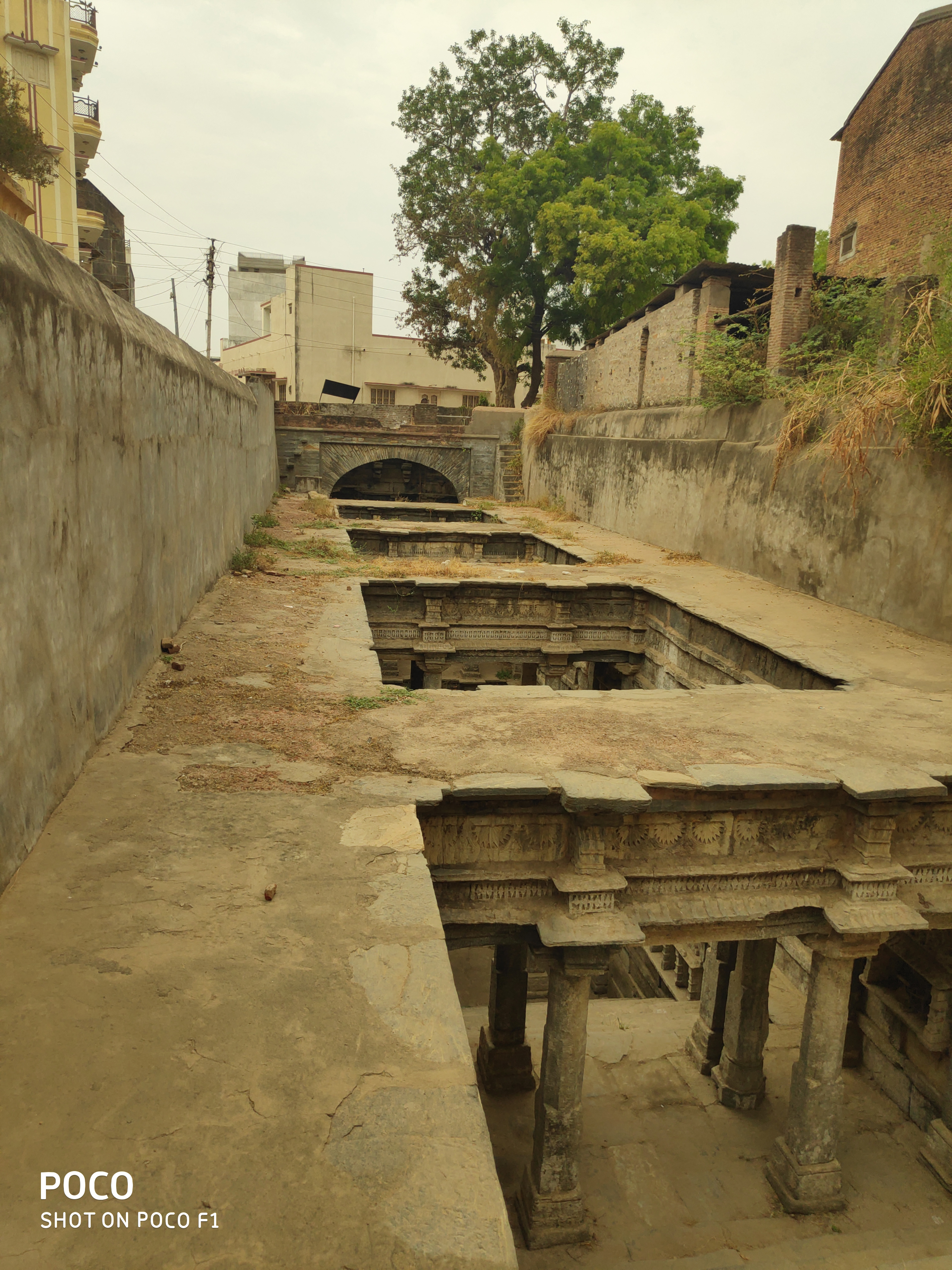

Vasa is a village in Sirohi District in Rajasthan state in India. It is 9 km from Swarupganj and 25 km from Abu Road and also known as Vasantpur or Vasantgarh. Vasa also has got a temple Laxminarayan Mandir whose foundation stone was laid by Mirabai.

== History ==
Vasa fell within a Princely Village before Indian Independence in 1947, and was ruled by the Parmar Rajput dynasty (one of the major Rajput clan of Rajasthan and Madhya Pradesh) under British dominion. Vasa was established by Sher Singh Parmar in the twelfth century. The last ruler was Thakur Sardar Singh (1927). The royal family of Parmar worship Sun or Surya Narayan Dev as their kuldevta, whose temple is also there in the village.

== Geography ==
Vasa Mere than a mile to the north-east of Rohera is the village of Rajasthan, on the outskirt of which is a fine temple of Surya (the sun god) of the eleventh or twelfth century. The village itself has various temples.

Vasa is famous for its sun temple, Jambeshwar Mahadev temple, vav (Stepwell of Vasa), Jamdgani Rushi Ashram and many other old temples. The sun temple is also called Surya Narayana mandir and was built in the twelfth century, as was the vav(stepwell).
