= Thomas Clayton (American football) =

American football player (born 1984)

No. 22, 34, 33
- Position: Running back

Personal information
- Born: April 26, 1984 (age 42); Alexandria, Virginia, U.S.
- Listed height: 5 ft 11 in (1.80 m)
- Listed weight: 225 lb (102 kg)

Career information
- High school: Mount Vernon (Alexandria)
- College: Kansas State
- NFL draft: 2007: 6th round, 186th overall pick

Career history
- San Francisco 49ers (2007–2009); New England Patriots (2010)*; Cleveland Browns (2010)*; New England Patriots (2010); Cleveland Browns (2010); New England Patriots (2010); Seattle Seahawks (2011)*; Cleveland Browns (2011); Arizona Cardinals (2012)*
- * Offseason or practice squad member only

Career NFL statistics
- Rushing attempts: 15
- Rushing yards: 29
- Receptions: 1
- Receiving yards: 3
- Stats at Pro Football Reference

Thomas Clayton (born April 26, 1984) is an American former professional football player who was a running back in the National Football League (NFL). He played college football for the Florida State Seminoles and Kansas State Wildcats. Clayton was selected by the San Francisco 49ers in the sixth round of the 2007 NFL draft.

He was also a member of the New England Patriots, Cleveland Browns, Seattle Seahawks and Arizona Cardinals.

== Early life ==
Clayton was born in Germany on April 26, 1984. Clayton grew up in the Washington DC metropolitan area where he attended Mount Vernon High School in Alexandria, Virginia, where he was a SuperPrep All-American running back. He was named to the USA Today All-USA team and was rated the eighth best running back nationally by Rivals.com and participated in U.S. Army All-American Bowl As a senior, he rushed for more than 2,000 yards.

== College career ==
Clayton began his college football career at Florida State University as a true freshman in 2002, rushing for 45 yards on 13 attempts. Clayton made his final appearance as a Seminole, playing in the 2003 Sugar Bowl. Following the BCS Bowl, Clayton then transferred to Kansas State University, where he sat out the 2003 season under NCAA transfer rules. In 2004, Clayton appeared in 10 games serving as primary backup to Darren Sproles. He finishing with 14 carries for 71 yards. In 2005, with the departure of Darren Sproles to the NFL, Clayton's junior year looked to be promising. Picking up where Sproles left off, Clayton looked to be Kansas State's new bell cow, shredding opposing defenses for an average of 164.5 yards per game and 7.7 yards per rush. Leading the nation in both rushing yards per game, and yards per carry after week 3, Clayton was off to one of the best starts in school history, piling up 329 yards in the first two games. It was the most rushing yards in school history for the first two games of a season. He needed 221 yards to equal the best three-game start in school history and 70 yards for the second-best start, and against a feeble University of North Texas opponent coming week 4, Clayton would have had no problem accomplishing that had he not been suspended due to an arrest during the team's week 3 bye. "Thomas Clayton, the nation's leading rusher, was arrested Friday and charged with aggravated battery, stemming from a Sept. 16 altercation involving a university parking services employee." Obviously slowed down by this arrest, Clayton found himself in the dog house after such a promising start. Working himself back into good grace with the team, Clayton was able to finish the 2005 season with two strong games against Nebraska (85 yards) and Missouri (104 yards), allowing him to finish as the team's leading rusher with 637 yards and 5 total touchdowns. In 2006, Clayton entered the season ranked amongst the nation's top 10 returning senior running backs. However, with the retirement of head coach Bill Snyder, and the hiring of Ron Prince, Clayton was not able to match his 2005 success. With obvious friction between Clayton and Prince, Clayton only started 4 games his senior year, finishing the year with 338 rushing yards and 3 touchdowns before parting ways with the team after week 6, for undisclosed reasons. Clayton's best game in 2006 came in week 3 against Kansas State's highest ranked opponent, #5 Louisville Cardinals, where he rushed for 119 yards on 15 carries, one of which went 69 yards for a touchdown. He also hauled in five passes for 34 yards.

Though Clayton only participated in 4 games his senior season, NFL scouts felt he displayed plenty of upside in his junior season to receive a 2007 NFL Combine invitation. Clayton also participated in the 2007 Senior Bowl. Clayton was a late addition to the 2007 Senior Bowl roster.

== Professional career ==
=== San Francisco 49ers ===
Clayton was selected by the San Francisco 49ers in the sixth round (186th overall) of the 2007 NFL draft. He went on to lead the NFL in rushing during the 2007 preseason. He duplicated his preseason success in 2008, where he led all rushers again. In August 2009, Clayton suffered an ACL injury, and was placed on injured reserve, where he spent the entire season.

=== New England Patriots (first stint) ===
Clayton signed with the New England Patriots on June 11, 2010. He was waived on August 6, 2010, but re-signed on August 11, 2010. He was waived during final cuts on September 4, 2010.

=== Cleveland Browns (first stint) ===
Clayton was signed to the Cleveland Browns' practice squad on September 14, 2010.

=== New England Patriots (second stint) ===
The Patriots signed Clayton off the Browns' practice squad on September 30, 2010. He was waived on October 23, 2010.

=== Cleveland Browns (second stint) ===
Clayton was claimed off waivers by the Browns on October 25, 2010. He was waived on December 1, 2010. He was active for two games, registering 0 yards on one carry in a Week 10 loss to the New York Jets.

=== New England Patriots (third stint) ===
The Patriots claimed Clayton off waivers on December 2, 2010. He played in one game for the Patriots, the Week 17 season finale against the Miami Dolphins, running six times for 17 yards. He was released on August 3, 2011.

=== Seattle Seahawks ===
Clayton was claimed off waivers by the Seattle Seahawks on August 3 and then released prior to the start of the season.

=== Cleveland Browns (third stint) ===
Clayton signed with the Browns on November 1, 2011, after Montario Hardesty tore his calf muscle.

=== Arizona Cardinals ===
Clayton signed with the Arizona Cardinals on July 31, 2012. He was waived/injured on August 24, 2012.
