= Roland Reiss =

American artist

- Born: May 15, 1929; Chicago, Illinois
- Died: December 13, 2020 (aged 91); Los Angeles, California

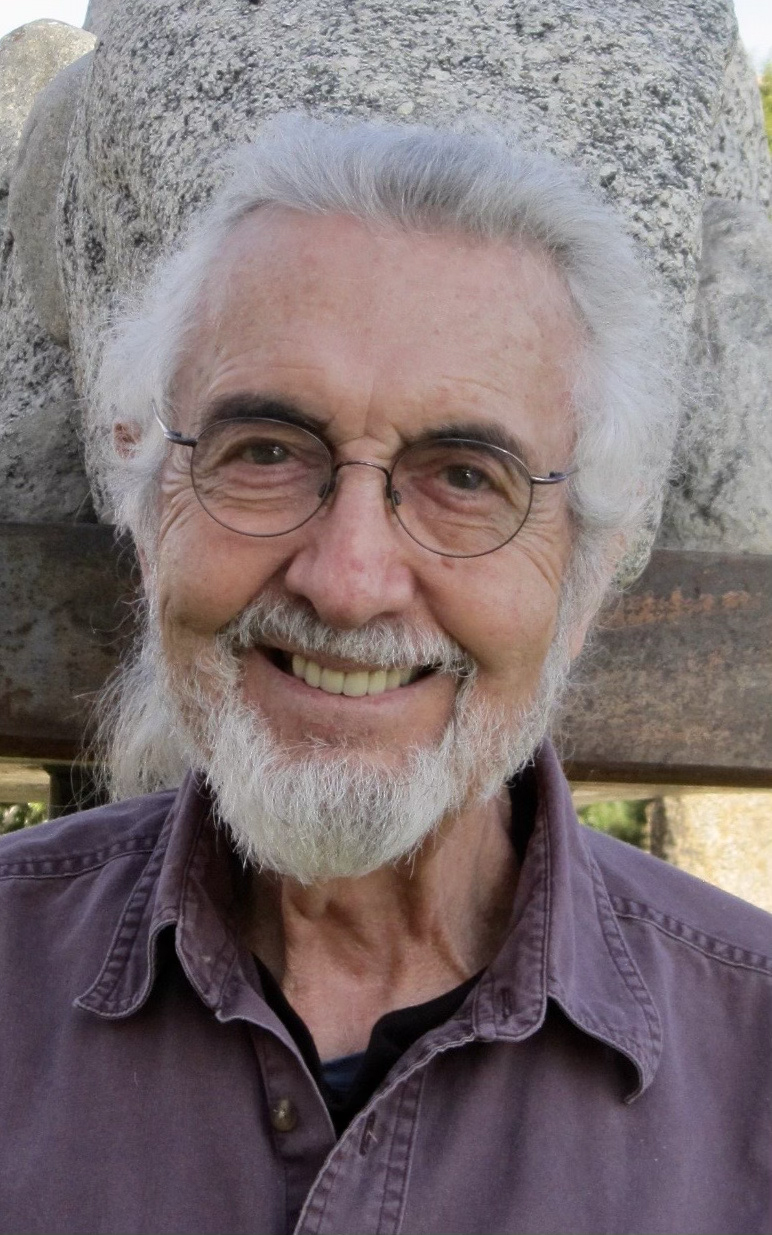

Roland Reiss (May 15, 1929– December 13, 2020) was an American artist known for his miniature tableaux and paintings.

== Early life, education and military service ==
Roland Reiss was born in Chicago, Illinois in 1929, during the Great Depression. He moved with his family at age 13 to Pomona, California. While he attended Pomona High School, he was inspired to become an artist after hearing Millard Sheets speak on art. He later studied art at Mt. San Antonio College and UCLA. He served in the US Army as a Sergeant First Class. After winning a national art price he managed forty artists working at Camp Roberts.

== Artistic career ==
Reiss began his art career as an abstract painter. In the 1960s he shifted to working with plastics in order "to move away from the brushstrokes, paint, and canvas of Abstract Expressionists. The technical elements of painting could be replaced with new surfaces, colors, textures, reflectivities, and physical strength."

By the 1970s Reiss was producing miniature tableaux, using plexiglass to encase or divide the scene. These gained Reiss significant critical attention. In the 1990s Reiss moved back to painting. He spent the last 15 years if his career creating large flower paintings.

== Educational career ==
In 1956, Reiss began teaching painting at the University of Colorado Boulder. In 1971, he was hired at Claremont Graduate University, where he headed the art department for 30 years. The university established an endowed chair in art in his name in 2010. In his retirement, he directed Painting's Edge, a summer artist's residency for Idyllwild Arts from 2000 to 2007. In 2009, he received the College Art Association Award for the Distinguished Teaching of Art.

== Personal life ==
In 1952 Reiss Married Betty Ravenscroft, with whom he had six children. In 1991 he married the artist Dawn Arrowsmith.

== Recognitions and Notable Shows ==
Reiss was included in the 1975 Whitney Biennial and in Documenta 7, held in 1982. He has been the recipient of four grants from the National Endowment for the Arts and many prizes and awards. He received fourteen solo museum exhibitions, among them The Dancing Lessons: 12 Sculptures (1977) at the Los Angeles County Museum of Art.

Reiss' personal papers are held by the Smithsonian Archives of American Art.

== Collections ==
- Los Angeles County Museum of Art
- Whitney Museum of Art, New York
- Museum of Contemporary Art, Los Angeles
- Hammer Museum
- Benton Museum of Art Pomona College
- Claremont Lewis Museum of Art
- Orange County Museum of Art
- Laguna Art Museum
