= Steve Dildine =

American football player (born 1984)

No. 51
- Position: Linebacker

Personal information
- Born: February 7, 1984 (age 42); Graham, Washington, U.S.
- Listed height: 6 ft 1 in (1.85 m)
- Listed weight: 238 lb (108 kg)

Career information
- College: Washington State
- NFL draft: 2007: undrafted

Career history
- San Francisco 49ers (2007)*
- * Offseason or practice squad member only

Steve Dildine (born February 7, 1984) is an American former football linebacker for the San Francisco 49ers of the National Football League. He was originally signed by the 49ers as an undrafted free agent in 2007. He played college football at Washington State.
