= 2010 San Francisco 49ers season =

American football team season

- Owner: John York
- Head coach: Mike Singletary (fired December 26, 5–10 record); Jim Tomsula (interim, 1–0 record)
- Offensive coordinator: Jimmy Raye
- Defensive coordinator: Greg Manusky
- Home stadium: Candlestick Park

Results
- Record: 6–10
- Division place: 3rd NFC West
- Playoffs: Did not qualify
- All-Pros: LB Patrick Willis (1st team)
- Pro Bowlers: 2: DE Justin Smith; ILB Patrick Willis

Uniform
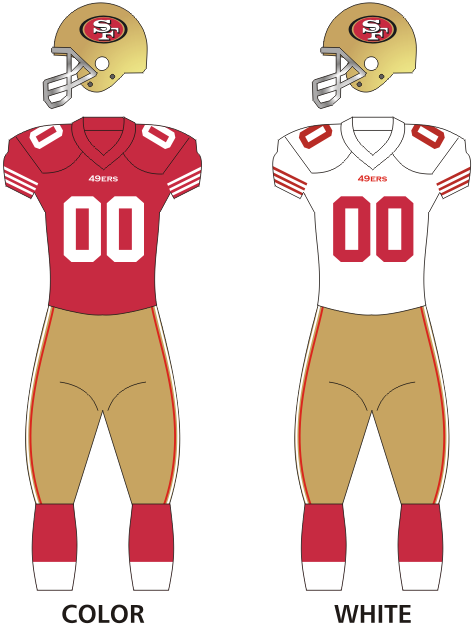

The 2010 season was the San Francisco 49ers' 61st in the National Football League (NFL), their 65th overall and their third and final under head coach Mike Singletary. The 49ers were looking to build upon their 8–8 season in 2009 and were expected by many to win the NFC West for the first time since 2002; however, they lost each of their first five games and ended up with a 6–10 record as they failed to reach the playoffs for the eighth consecutive season. The 49ers originally retained Jimmy Raye as the offensive coordinator, marking the first time since Greg Knapp in 2003 that the 49ers had the same offensive coordinator for more than one season; however, after their third loss to start the season, the 49ers fired Raye and promoted quarterbacks coach Mike Johnson to offensive coordinator. Ultimately, head coach Singletary was himself fired before the last game of the season. He was replaced by defensive line coach Jim Tomsula for the final game of the regular season.

== Offseason ==
=== Coaching changes ===
The first major coaching change in the offseason was the firing of Al Everest as special teams coordinator. The 49ers interviewed several candidates and by mid-January settled on Kurt Schottenheimer as special-teams coordinator. One week later, another assistant coaching change was made when incumbent offensive line coach Chris Foerster was permitted to accept an offer to coach the same position with new Washington Redskins head coach Mike Shanahan. To replace Foerster, the 49ers immediately hired outgoing Seahawks offensive line coach Mike Solari, who had previously been an assistant line coach with the 49ers.

=== Roster changes ===
==== Free Agency ====
San Francisco 49ers Free Agency
Position	Player	Status*	2009 Team	2010 Team
K	Shane Andrus	RFA	San Francisco 49ers	San Francisco 49ers
G	David Baas	RFA	San Francisco 49ers	San Francisco 49ers
WR	Arnaz Battle	UFA	San Francisco 49ers	Pittsburgh Steelers
CB	Dre' Bly	UFA	San Francisco 49ers	Detroit Lions
LB	Ahmad Brooks	RFA	San Francisco 49ers	San Francisco 49ers
QB	David Carr	UFA	New York Giants	San Francisco 49ers
RB	Thomas Clayton	RFA	San Francisco 49ers	New England Patriots
NT	Aubrayo Franklin	Franchise	San Francisco 49ers	San Francisco 49ers
CB	Walt Harris	UFA	San Francisco 49ers	Baltimore Ravens
DB	Marcus Hudson	RFA	San Francisco 49ers	Carolina Panthers
CB	William James	UFA	Detroit Lions	San Francisco 49ers
OT	Tony Pashos	UFA	San Francisco 49ers	Cleveland Browns
CB	Karl Paymah	UFA	Minnesota Vikings	San Francisco 49ers
SS	Mark Roman	UFA	San Francisco 49ers	TBD
K	Ricky Schmitt	RFA	San Francisco 49ers	Tennessee Titans
OT	Barry Sims	UFA	San Francisco 49ers	San Francisco 49ers
LB	Jeff Ulbrich	UFA	San Francisco 49ers	Retired (Now Coach)
RB	Brian Westbrook	UFA	Philadelphia Eagles	San Francisco 49ers
WR	Brandon Jones	UFA	San Francisco 49ers	Seattle Seahawks

*RFA: Restricted free agent, UFA: Unrestricted free agent, ERFA: Exclusive rights free agent, Franchise: Franchise tag

==== Trades ====
San Francisco 49ers Trades
Trading team	49ers Receive	49ers Give
Detroit Lions	2011 7th-round draft pick	QB Shaun Hill
Miami Dolphins	WR Ted Ginn Jr.	2010 5th-round draft pick
Denver Broncos	2010 1st-round draft pick (11)	2010 1st-round draft pick (13) 2010 4th-round draft pick (113)
San Diego Chargers	2010 3rd-round draft pick (91) 2010 6th-round draft pick (197); 2011 4th-round draft pick	2010 3rd-round draft pick (79)
Seattle Seahawks	2011 6th-round draft pick	DE Kentwan Balmer

== 2010 NFL draft ==
After finishing the 2009 season with a record of 8–8, the 49ers held the 13th overall pick in the 2010 NFL draft. They also obtained the 17th overall pick as a result of a trade in the 2009 NFL draft that gave their second and fourth round picks in 2009 to the Carolina Panthers for the Panthers' first round pick in 2010. The 49ers traded their fifth round pick in 2010 to Miami for wide receiver Ted Ginn Jr. In the first round of the 2010 draft the 49ers moved up two picks by trading their #13 pick and 4th Round pick to the Denver Broncos to move up to pick #11, with which they selected offensive tackle Anthony Davis from Rutgers. Six picks later, the 49ers again chose to solidify their offensive line by selecting top-rated guard Mike Iupati out of Idaho.

San Francisco 49ers 2010 NFL Draft selections
Draft order			Player name	Position	Height	Weight	College	Contract	Notes
Round	Choice	Overall	Player name	Position	Height	Weight	College	Contract	Notes
1	11	11	Anthony Davis	T	6 ft 5 in	323 lb	Rutgers		From Denver Broncos
1	13	13	Traded to the Denver Broncos						
1	17	17	Mike Iupati	G	6 ft 5 in	331 lb	Idaho		From Carolina Panthers
2	17	49	Taylor Mays	S	6 ft 3 in	230 lb	USC		
3	15	79	Traded to the San Diego Chargers						
3	27	91	NaVorro Bowman	LB	6 ft 0 in	242 lb	Penn State		from San Diego Chargers
4	15	113	Traded to the Denver Broncos						
5	14	145	Traded to the Miami Dolphins						
6	4	173	Anthony Dixon	RB	6 ft 1 in	233 lb	Mississippi State		From San Diego Chargers
6	13	182	Nate Byham	TE	6 ft 4 in	268 lb	Pittsburgh		
6	37	206	Kyle Williams	WR	5 ft 10 in	188 lb	Arizona State		Compensatory pick
7	17	224	Phillip Adams	CB	5 ft 10 in	192 lb	South Carolina State		

== Staff ==
2010 San Francisco 49ers staff
Front office: Co-chairman – Denise DeBartolo York; Co-chairman – John York; President/CEO – Jed York; Executive vice president of football and business operations – Paraag Marathe; Executive vice president of football administration – Lal Heneghan; Vice president of player personnel – Trent Baalke; general manager – Trent Baalke; Director of pro personnel – Tom Gamble; Director of college scouting – Joel Patten; Director of football operations – Brian Hampton; Head coaches: Head coach – Mike Singletary; Interim head coach/defensive line – Jim Tomsula; Special assistant to the head coach – Bill Nayes; Special assistant to the head coach/defensive backs/secondary – Johnnie Lynn; Offensive coaches: Offensive coordinator – Jimmy Raye; Offensive coordinator/quarterbacks – Mike Johnson; Running backs – Tom Rathman; Senior assistant/wide receivers – Jerry Sullivan; Tight ends – Pete Hoener; Offensive line – Mike Solari; Assistant offensive line – Ray Brown; Offensive assistant/quarterbacks – Jason Michael; Offensive assistant – Chris Beake	Defensive coaches: Defensive coordinator – Greg Manusky; Outside linebackers – Jason Tarver; Inside linebackers – Vantz Singletary; Defensive backs – Vance Joseph; Pass rush specialist – Al Harris; Special teams coaches: Special teams coordinator – Kurt Schottenheimer; Assistant special teams – Dave Fipp; Strength and conditioning: Head strength and conditioning – Duane Carlisle; Assistant strength and conditioning – Mark Uyeyama

== Roster ==
2010 San Francisco 49ers roster
Quarterbacks (QB): 5 David Carr; 11 Alex Smith; 1 Troy Smith; Running backs (RB): 24 Anthony Dixon; 44 Moran Norris FB; 20 Brian Westbrook; Wide receivers (WR): 15 Michael Crabtree; 19 Ted Ginn Jr. RS; 84 Josh Morgan; 10 Kyle Williams; Tight ends (TE): 82 Nate Byham; 83 Colin Cloherty; 85 Vernon Davis; 46 Delanie Walker	Offensive linemen (OL): 64 David Baas C; 75 Alex Boone T; 76 Anthony Davis T; 77 Mike Iupati G; 62 Chilo Rachal G; 65 Barry Sims T; 68 Adam Snyder G/T; 74 Joe Staley T; 69 Tony Wragge G/C; Defensive linemen (DL): 93 Demetric Evans DE; 92 Aubrayo Franklin NT; 95 Ricky Jean Francois NT; 91 Ray McDonald DE; 94 Justin Smith DE; 90 Isaac Sopoaga DE; 63 Will Tukuafu DE	Linebackers (LB): 53 NaVorro Bowman ILB; 55 Ahmad Brooks OLB; 59 Thaddeus Gibson OLB; 98 Parys Haralson OLB; 58 Alex Joseph ILB; 57 Keaton Kristick ILB; 99 Manny Lawson OLB; 51 Takeo Spikes ILB; 52 Patrick Willis ILB; Defensive backs (DB): 35 Phillip Adams CB; 26 Tramaine Brock CB; 25 Tarell Brown CB; 22 Nate Clements CB; 38 Dashon Goldson FS; 31 Will James CB; 40 Chris Maragos SS; 23 Taylor Mays SS; 30 Reggie Smith SS; 36 Shawntae Spencer CB; 27 C. J. Spillman FS; Special teams (ST): 86 Brian Jennings LS; 4 Andy Lee P; 3 Jeff Reed K	Practice squad: 7 Nate Davis QB; 13 Bakari Grant WR; 60 Nick Howell T; 14 Kevin Jurovich WR; 71 Dennis Landolt T; 18 Lance Long WR; 33 Xavier Omon RB; 2 Fabrizio Scaccia K; Reserve: 21 Frank Gore RB (IR); 66 Eric Heitmann C (IR); 54 Travis LaBoy OLB (IR); 56 Scott McKillop ILB (IR); 6 Joe Nedney K (IR); 61 Chris Patrick G (IR); 28 Curtis Taylor SS (IR); 17 Dominique Zeigler WR (IR); Rookies in italics 53 active, 8 reserve, 8 practice squad

== Schedule ==
=== Preseason ===
Week	Date	Opponent	Result	Record	Venue	Recap
1	August 15	at Indianapolis Colts	**W** 37–17	1–0	Lucas Oil Stadium	Recap
2	August 22	Minnesota Vikings	**W** 15–10	2–0	Candlestick Park	Recap
3	August 28	at Oakland Raiders	**W** 28–24	3–0	Oakland–Alameda County Coliseum	Recap
4	September 2	San Diego Chargers	**W** 17–14	4–0	Candlestick Park	Recap

=== Regular season ===
Week	Date	Opponent	Result	Record	Venue	Recap
1	September 12	at **Seattle Seahawks**	**L** 6–31	0–1	Qwest Field	Recap
2	September 20	New Orleans Saints	**L** 22–25	0–2	Candlestick Park	Recap
3	September 26	at Kansas City Chiefs	**L** 10–31	0–3	Arrowhead Stadium	Recap
4	October 3	at Atlanta Falcons	**L** 14–16	0–4	Georgia Dome	Recap
5	October 10	Philadelphia Eagles	**L** 24–27	0–5	Candlestick Park	Recap
6	October 17	Oakland Raiders	**W** 17–9	1–5	Candlestick Park	Recap
7	October 24	at Carolina Panthers	**L** 20–23	1–6	Bank of America Stadium	Recap
8	October 31	Denver Broncos	**W** 24–16	2–6	(United Kingdom) Wembley Stadium (London)	Recap
9	Bye					
10	November 14	**St. Louis Rams**	**W** 23–20 (OT)	3–6	Candlestick Park	Recap
11	November 21	Tampa Bay Buccaneers	**L** 0–21	3–7	Candlestick Park	Recap
12	November 29	at **Arizona Cardinals**	**W** 27–6	4–7	University of Phoenix Stadium	Recap
13	December 5	at Green Bay Packers	**L** 16–34	4–8	Lambeau Field	Recap
14	December 12	**Seattle Seahawks**	**W** 40–21	5–8	Candlestick Park	Recap
15	December 16	at San Diego Chargers	**L** 7–34	5–9	Qualcomm Stadium	Recap
16	December 26	at **St. Louis Rams**	**L** 17–25	5–10	Edward Jones Dome	Recap
17	January 2, 2011	**Arizona Cardinals**	**W** 38–7	6–10	Candlestick Park	Recap
Note: Intra-division opponents are in **bold** text.

== Standings ==
NFC West
	W	L	T	PCT	DIV	CONF	PF	PA	STK
^{(4)} Seattle Seahawks	7	9	0	.438	4–2	6–6	310	407	W1
St. Louis Rams	7	9	0	.438	3–3	5–7	289	328	L1
San Francisco 49ers	6	10	0	.375	4–2	4–8	305	346	W1
Arizona Cardinals	5	11	0	.313	1–5	3–9	289	434	L1

== Regular season results ==
=== Week 1: at Seattle Seahawks ===
Week 1: San Francisco 49ers at Seattle Seahawks – Game summary

Quarter	1	2	3	4	Total
49ers	3	3	0	0	6
Seahawks	0	14	14	3	31

at Qwest Field, Seattle, Washington

- Date: September 12
- Game time: 1:15 p.m. PDT
- Game weather: 64 °F (18 °C) (Sunny)
- Game attendance: 67,044
- Referee: Mike Carey
- TV announcers (FOX): Sam Rosen, Tim Ryan, and Chris Myers
- Recap

Game information

First quarter

- SF – Joe Nedney 23-yard field goal, 49ers 3–0, Drive: 8 plays, 24 yards, 4:35.

Second quarter

- SF – Joe Nedney 23-yard field goal, 49ers 6–0, Drive: 9 plays, 31 yards, 5:48.
- SEA – Matt Hasselbeck 1-yard run (Olindo Mare kick), Seahawks 7–6, Drive: 7 plays, 64 yards, 3:57.
- SEA – Deon Butler 13-yard pass from Matt Hasselbeck (Olindo Mare kick), Seahawks 14–6, Drive:1 plays, 13 yards, 0:06.

Third quarter

- SEA – Marcus Trufant 32-yard interception return (Olindo Mare kick), Seahawks 21–6.
- SEA – Deion Branch 3-yard pass from Matt Hasselbeck (Olindo Mare kick), Seahawks 28–6, Drive: 7 plays, 60 yards, 2:56.

Fourth quarter

- SEA – Olindo Mare 35-yard field goal, Seahawks 31–6, Drive: 10 plays, 57 yards, 6:32.

Top passers

- SF – Alex Smith – 26/45, 220 yards, 2 interceptions
- SEA – Matt Hasselbeck – 18/23, 170 yards, 2 touchdowns, 1 interception

Top rushers

- SF – Frank Gore – 17 rushes, 38 yards
- SEA – Justin Forsett – 7 rushes, 43 yards

Top receivers

- SF – Vernon Davis – 8 receptions, 73 yards
- SEA – Mike Williams – 4 receptions, 64 yards

Top tacklers

- SF – Patrick Willis – 10 tackles
- SEA – Lofa Tatupu – 5 tackles, 3 assists

The 49ers began their season at Qwest Field for an NFC West match against the Seattle Seahawks. In the first quarter, the Niners had the early lead when kicker Joe Nedney made a 23-yard field goal, which was extended in the second quarter when Nedney made another 23-yard field goal. Then, San Francisco failed to maintain it and then fell behind when Seahawks quarterback Matt Hasselbeck got a 1-yard touchdown run, followed by him making a 13-yard touchdown pass to wide receiver Deon Butler. In the third quarter, the 49ers struggled further when quarterback Alex Smith threw an interception to cornerback Marcus Trufant, which was returned 32 yards for a touchdown. This was followed by Hasselbeck's 3-yard touchdown pass to wide receiver Deion Branch. In the fourth quarter, the Niners continued to struggle when kicker Olindo Mare made a 35-yard field goal.

With the loss, the 49ers began their season at 0–1.

=== Week 2: vs. New Orleans Saints ===
Week 2: New Orleans Saints at San Francisco 49ers – Game summary

Quarter	1	2	3	4	Total
Saints	9	0	7	9	25
49ers	0	7	7	8	22

at Candlestick Park, San Francisco, California

- Date: September 20
- Game time: 5:30 pm. PDT
- Game weather: 65 °F (18 °C) (Sunny)
- Game attendance: 69,732
- Referee: Alberto Riveron
- TV announcers (ESPN): Mike Tirico, Jon Gruden, Ron Jaworski, Suzy Kolber and Michele Tafoya
- Recap

Game information

First quarter

- NO – David Baas fumble out of bounds in end zone for a safety, Saints 2–0.
- NO – Reggie Bush 6-yard pass from Drew Brees (Garrett Hartley kick), Saints 9–0, Drive: 7 plays, 46 yards, 3:55.

Second quarter

- SF – Frank Gore 12-yard pass from Alex Smith (Joe Nedney kick), Saints 9–7, Drive: 12 plays, 85 yards, 5:43.

Third quarter

- SF – Anthony Dixon 2-yard run (Joe Nedney kick), 49ers 14–9, Drive: 6 plays, 86 yards, 3:36.
- NO – David Thomas 3-yard pass from Drew Brees (Garrett Hartley kick), Saints 16–14, Drive: 10 plays, 61 yards, 5:08.

Fourth quarter

- NO – Garrett Hartley 46-yard field goal, Saints 19–14, Drive: 4 plays, 7 yards, 1:29.
- NO – Garrett Hartley 19-yard field goal, Saints 22–14, Drive: 6 plays, 13 yards, 3:15.
- SF – Frank Gore 7-yard run (Alex Smith – Vernon Davis pass), Tied 22–22, Drive: 8 plays, 82 yards, 0:53.
- NO – Garrett Hartley 37-yard field goal, Saints 25–22, Drive: 7 plays, 51 yards, 1:19.

Top passers

- NO – Drew Brees – 28/38, 254 yards, 2 touchdowns
- SF – Alex Smith – 23/32, 275 yards, 1 touchdown, 2 interceptions

Top rushers

- NO – Pierre Thomas – 18 rushes, 46 yards
- SF – Frank Gore – 20 rushes, 112 yards, 1 touchdown

Top receivers

- NO – Marques Colston – 5 receptions, 67 yards
- SF – Vernon Davis – 4 receptions, 78 yards

Top tacklers

- NO – Jonathan Vilma – 7 tackles, 3 assists, 1 forced fumble
- SF – Patrick Willis – 8 tackles, 1 assist, 1.0 sack

Hoping to rebound from their divisional road loss to the Seahawks, the 49ers played their Week 2 home opener against the defending Super Bowl champion New Orleans Saints on Monday night.

San Francisco trailed early in the first quarter as center David Baas' high snap deep within Niner territory resulted in a safety. The Saints would add onto their lead as quarterback Drew Brees completed a 6-yard touchdown pass to running back Reggie Bush. The 49ers would respond in the second quarter with quarterback Alex Smith finding running back Frank Gore on a 12-yard touchdown pass.

The Niners would take the lead in the third quarter as rookie running back Anthony Dixon got a 2-yard touchdown run, but New Orleans would answer with Brees' 3-yard touchdown pass to tight end David Thomas. In the fourth quarter, the Saints would add onto their lead as kicker Garrett Hartley got a 46-yard and a 19-yard field goal. San Francisco would tie the game with Gore's 7-yard touchdown run, followed by Smith's 2-point conversion pass to tight end Vernon Davis. However, New Orleans would get the last laugh as Hartley made the game-winning 37-yard field goal.

With the loss, the 49ers fell to 0–2.

=== Week 3: at Kansas City Chiefs ===
Week 3: San Francisco 49ers at Kansas City Chiefs – Game summary

Quarter	1	2	3	4	Total
49ers	0	3	0	7	10
Chiefs	0	10	14	7	31

at Arrowhead Stadium, Kansas City, Missouri

- Date: September 26
- Game time: 12:00 pm. CDT/10:00 am. PDT
- Game weather: 55 °F (13 °C) (Sunny)
- Game attendance: 68,188
- Referee: Clete Blakeman
- TV announcers (FOX): Sam Rosen, Tim Ryan and Chris Myers
- Recap

Game information

First quarter

- No scoring plays

Second quarter

- KC – Dexter McCluster 31-yard pass from Matt Cassel (Ryan Succop kick), Chiefs 7–0, Drive: 1 plays, 31 yards, 0:10.
- SF – Joe Nedney 51-yard field goal, Chiefs 7–3, Drive: 8 plays, 45 yards, 3:22.
- KC – Ryan Succop 32-yard field goal, Chiefs 10–3, Drive: 7 plays, 44 yards, 1:05.

Third quarter

- KC – Dwayne Bowe 45-yard pass from Matt Cassel (Ryan Succop kick), Chiefs 17–3, Drive: 2 plays, 45 yards, 0:16.
- KC – Tony Moeaki 18-yard pass from Matt Cassel (Ryan Succop kick), Chiefs 24–3, Drive: 8 plays, 61 yards, 5:05.

Fourth quarter

- KC – Thomas Jones 3-yard run (Ryan Succop kick), Chiefs 31–3, Drive: 7 plays, 57 yards, 4:26.
- SF – Josh Morgan 12-yard pass from Alex Smith (Joe Nedney kick), Chiefs 31–10, Drive: 7 plays, 71 yards, 1:23.

Top passers

- SF – Alex Smith – 23/42, 232 yards, 1 touchdown, 1 interception
- KC – Matt Cassel – 16/27, 250 yards, 3 touchdowns, 1 interception

Top rushers

- SF – Frank Gore – 15 rushes, 43 yards
- KC – Jamaal Charles – 12 rushes, 97 yards

Top receivers

- SF – Frank Gore – 9 receptions, 102 yards
- KC – Dexter McCluster – 3 receptions, 69 yards, 1 touchdown

Top tacklers

- SF – Nate Clements – 9 tackles
- KC – Jovan Belcher – 7 tackles, 3 assists

Looking for their first win, the 49ers flew to Arrowhead Stadium for an interconference duel with the Chiefs. Prior to the game, tight end Vernon Davis guaranteed victory. In the 2nd quarter, the 49ers trailed early as QB Matt Cassel completed a 31-yard TD pass to WR Dexter McCluster. The 49ers replied with kicker Joe Nedney hitting a 51-yard field goal. The 49ers fell further behind when Chiefs' kicker Ryan Succop hit a 32-yard field goal and then in the third quarter when Cassel found WR Dwayne Bowe and TE Tony Moeaki on 45 and 18-yard TD passes, respectively. RB Thomas Jones followed these scores with a 3-yard TD run. The 49ers narrowed the score when QB Alex Smith made a 12-yard TD pass to WR Josh Morgan.

With the loss, the 49ers fell to 0–3.

=== Week 4: at Atlanta Falcons ===
Week 4: San Francisco 49ers at Atlanta Falcons – Game summary

Quarter	1	2	3	4	Total
49ers	14	0	0	0	14
Falcons	0	10	3	3	16

at Georgia Dome, Atlanta, Georgia

- Date: October 3
- Game time: 1:00 pm. EDT/10:00 am. PDT
- Game weather: None (dome stadium)
- Game attendance: 66,874
- Referee: Tony Corrente
- TV announcers (FOX): Dick Stockton, Charles Davis, Jim Mora & Laura Okmin
- Recap

Game information

First quarter

- SF – Vernon Davis 12-yard pass from Alex Smith (Joe Nedney kick), 49ers 7–0, Drive: 10 plays, 88 yards, 6:16.
- SF – Taylor Mays blocked punt recovery in end zone (Joe Nedney kick), 49ers 14–0.

Second quarter

- ATL – Harry Douglas 8-yard pass from Matt Ryan (Matt Bryant kick), 49ers 14–7, Drive: 12 plays, 71 yards, 6:17.
- ATL – Matt Bryant 37-yard field goal, 49ers 14–10, Drive: 11 plays, 49 yards, 1:13.

Third quarter

- ATL – Matt Bryant 31-yard field goal, 49ers 14–13, Drive: 7 plays, 41 yards, 3:27.

Fourth quarter

- ATL – Matt Bryant 43-yard field goal, Falcons 16–14, Drive: 12 plays, 68 yards, 1:20.

Top passers

- SF – Alex Smith – 21/32, 188 yards, 1 touchdown, 2 interceptions
- ATL – Matt Ryan – 26/43, 273 yards, 1 touchdown, 2 interceptions

Top rushers

- SF – Frank Gore – 21 rushes, 77 yards
- ATL – Michael Turner – 16 rushes, 50 yards

Top receivers

- SF – Frank Gore – 7 receptions, 60 yards
- ATL – Roddy White – 7 receptions, 104 yards

Top tacklers

- SF – Taylor Mays – 9 tackles, 2 assists
- ATL – Stephen Nicholas – 12 tackles, 1 assist

Still looking for a win the 49ers flew to Georgia Dome for an NFC duel with the Falcons. In the first quarter the 49ers took the early lead with QB Alex Smith making a 12-yard TD pass to TE Vernon Davis. Then safety Taylor Mays recovered a blocked punt in the endzone for a touchdown. Then the Falcons rallied with QB Matt Ryan completing an 8-yard TD pass to WR Harry Douglas. Then the Falcons took the lead with three field goals from kicker Matt Bryant. He made a 37-yard field goal near the end of the 2nd quarter, a 31-yard field goad in the 3rd. Late in the 4th quarter, CB Nate Clements intercepted Matt Ryan's pass which should have sealed the game for the 49ers who were then up 14 – 13. However, instead of going down, Clements continued down the left sideline attempting to score. He would return the interception 39 yards before Falcons WR Roddy White was able to strip the ball from him and the Falcons recovered the fumble. After regaining possession, the Falcons drove down the field again and this time was able to win the game on a 43-yard field goal by Matt Bryant, giving the 49ers another loss.

With the close loss, the 49ers fell to 0–4.

=== Week 5: vs. Philadelphia Eagles ===
Week 5: Philadelphia Eagles at San Francisco 49ers – Game summary

Quarter	1	2	3	4	Total
Eagles	7	10	0	10	27
49ers	7	3	0	14	24

at Candlestick Park, San Francisco, California

- Date: October 10
- Game time: 5:20 pm. PDT
- Game weather: 71 °F (22 °C), clear skies, sunny
- Game attendance: 69,732
- Referee: Walt Anderson
- TV announcers (NBC): Al Michaels, Cris Collinsworth, and Andrea Kremer
- Recap

Game information

First quarter

- SF – Michael Crabtree 7-yard pass from Alex Smith (Joe Nedney kick), 49ers 7–0, Drive: 11 plays, 51 yards, 7:07.
- PHI – Brent Celek 8-yard pass from Kevin Kolb (David Akers kick), Tied 7–7, Drive: 10 plays, 75 yards, 5:30.

Second quarter

- PHI – David Akers 33-yard field goal, Eagles 10–7, Drive: 7 plays, 31 yards, 3:31.
- PHI – LeSean McCoy 29-yard run, (David Akers kick), Eagles 17–7, Drive: 3 plays, 53 yards, 1:10.
- SF – Joe Nedney 50-yard field goal, Eagles 17–10, Drive: 7 plays, 48 yards, 1:10.

Third quarter

- No scoring plays

Fourth quarter

- PHI – Quintin Mikell 52-yard fumble return (David Akers kick), Eagles 24–10.
- SF – Vernon Davis 7-yard pass from Alex Smith (Joe Nedney kick), Eagles 24–17, Drive: 6 plays, 69 yards, 3:35.
- PHI – David Akers 45-yard field goal, Eagles 27–17, Drive: 6 plays, 37 yards, 3:00.
- SF – Frank Gore 1-yard pass from Alex Smith (Joe Nedney kick), Eagles 27–24, Drive: 7 plays, 36 yards, 2:33.

Top passers

- PHI – Kevin Kolb – 21/31, 253 yards, 1 touchdown
- SF – Alex Smith – 25/39, 309 yards, 3 touchdowns, 2 interceptions

Top rushers

- PHI – LeSean McCoy – 18 rushes, 92 yards, 1 touchdown
- SF – Frank Gore – 18 rushes, 52 yards

Top receivers

- PHI – Jeremy Maclin – 6 receptions, 95 yards
- SF – Michael Crabtree – 9 receptions, 105 yards, 1 touchdown

Top tacklers

- PHI – Quintin Mikell – 8 tackles
- SF – Takeo Spikes – 8 tackles

Hoping to get their first win of the season, the 49ers went home for a Week 5 Sunday night duel with the Philadelphia Eagles. The Niners delivered the game's opening strike in the first quarter as quarterback Alex Smith hooked up with wide receiver Michael Crabtree on a 7-yard touchdown pass, but the Eagles would answer with quarterback Kevin Kolb completing an 8-yard touchdown pass to tight end Brent Celek. Philadelphia took the lead in the second quarter as kicker David Akers made a 33-yard field goal, followed by running back LeSean McCoy's 29-yard touchdown run. Afterwards, San Francisco closed out the half with kicker Joe Nedney booting a 50-yard field goal. After a scoreless third quarter, the Eagles would add onto their lead in the fourth quarter as safety Quintin Mikell returned a fumble 52 yards for a touchdown. The Niners began to rally as Smith found tight end Vernon Davis on a 7-yard touchdown pass, yet Philadelphia answered with a 45-yard field goal from Akers. San Francisco tried to rally as Smith found running back Frank Gore on a 1-yard touchdown pass, but Philadelphia's defense would hold on for the win.

With the loss, the 49ers fell to their first 0–5 start since 1979.

=== Week 6: vs. Oakland Raiders ===
Week 6: Oakland Raiders at San Francisco 49ers – Game summary

Quarter	1	2	3	4	Total
Raiders	3	3	0	3	9
49ers	0	3	7	7	17

at Candlestick Park, San Francisco, California

- Date: October 17
- Game time: 1:05 pm. PDT
- Game weather: 53 °F (12 °C) (Rain)
- Game attendance: 69,732
- Referee: Carl Cheffers
- TV announcers (CBS): Bill Macatee and Rich Gannon
- Recap

Game information

First quarter

- OAK – Sebastian Janikowski 27-yard field goal, Raiders 3–0, Drive: 13 plays, 79 yards, 7:82.

Second quarter

- OAK – Sebastian Janikowski 24-yard field goal, Raiders 6–0, Drive: 12 plays, 85 yards, 6:22.
- SF – Joe Nedney 25-yard field goal, Raiders 6–3, Drive: 10 plays, 77 yards, 2:10.

Third quarter

- SF – Michael Crabtree 32-yard pass from Alex Smith (Joe Nedney kick), 49ers 10–6, Drive: 13 plays, 91 yards, 8:11.

Fourth quarter

- OAK – Sebastian Janikowski 40-yard field goal, 49ers 10–9, Drive: 8 plays, 55 yards, 2:53.
- SF – Vernon Davis 17-yard pass from Alex Smith (Joe Nedney kick), 49ers 17–9, Drive: 3 plays, 80 yards, 1:07.

Top passers

- OAK – Jason Campbell – 8/21, 83 yards, 2 interceptions
- SF – Alex Smith – 16/33, 196 yards, 2 touchdowns

Top rushers

- OAK – Michael Bush – 20 rushes, 47 yards
- SF – Frank Gore – 25 rushes, 149 yards

Top receivers

- OAK – Zach Miller – 2 receptions, 48 yards
- SF – Michael Crabtree – 4 receptions, 57 yards, 1 touchdown

Top tacklers

- OAK – Tyvon Branch – 7 tackles, 2 assists
- SF – Takeo Spikes – 6 tackles, 1 assist, 1 interception

	Oakland Raiders	San Francisco 49ers
First downs	10	17
Third down efficiency	5/15	7/17
Fourth down efficiency	0/0	0/0
Total yards	179	349
Passing yards	69	191
Passing – completions/attempts	8/21	16/33
Rushing yards	110	158
Rushing attempts	30	31
Yards per rush	3.7	5.1
Penalties–yards	8–60	11–143
Sacks against–yards	1–7	0–0
Fumbles–lost	2–0	0–0
Interceptions thrown	2	0
Time of possession	26:39	33:21

=== Individual leaders ===
49ers Passing
	C/ATT^{*}	Yds	TD	INT
Alex Smith	16/33	196	2	0
49ers Rushing
	Car^{a}	Yds	TD	LG^{b}
Frank Gore	25	149	0	64
Anthony Dixon	1	9	0	9
Ted Ginn Jr.	1	2	0	2
Alex Smith	4	−2	0	1
49ers Receiving
	Rec^{c}	Yds	TD	LG^{b}
Michael Crabtree	4	57	1	32
Josh Morgan	3	49	0	35
Vernon Davis	4	35	1	17
Ted Ginn Jr.	2	23	0	19
Brian Westbrook	1	19	0	19
Nate Byham	1	7	0	7
Dominique Zeigler	1	6	0	6
49ers Defense
	Tak/Ast/Tot^{t}	Sck	Int	Ff^{g}
Takeo Spikes	6/1/7	0.0	0	0
Justin Smith	4/1/5	0.0	0	0
Nate Clements	3/0/3	0.0	0	1
Patrick Willis	3/3/6	0.0	0	0
Aubrayo Franklin	3/0/3	0.0	0	0
Ricky Jean-Francois	2/1/3	1.0	0	1
Taylor Mays	2/0/2	0.0	0	0
Demetric Evans	2/0/0	0.0	0	0
Parys Haralson	1/0/1	1.0	0	0
Manny Lawson	1/0/1	0.0	1	0

Raiders Passing
	C/ATT^{*}	Yds	TD	INT
Jason Campbell	8/21	83	0	2
Raiders Rushing
	Car^{a}	Yds	TD	LG^{b}
Michael Bush	20	47	0	5
Louis Murphy	1	43	0	43
Jason Campbell	7	21	0	9
Marcel Reece	1	2	0	2
Rock Cartwright	1	−3	0	−3
Raiders Receiving
	Rec^{c}	Yds	TD	LG^{b}
Zach Miller	2	48	0	26
Darrius Heyward-Bey	3	19	0	8
Michael Bush	2	12	0	7
Louis Murphy	1	4	0	4
Raiders Defense
	Tak/Ast/Tot^{t}	Int	Ff^{g}	Sck
Tyvon Branch	7/2/9	0.0	0	0
Michael Huff	6/1/7	0.0	0	0
Tommy Kelly	5/1/6	1.0	0	0
Matt Shaughnessy	4/0/4	1.0	0	0
Stanford Routt	4/0/4	0.0	0	0
Kamerion Wimbley	3/0/3	0.0	0	0
Nnamdi Asomugha	1/0/1	0.0	0	0
Mike Mitchell	1/2/3	0.0	0	0
Trevor Scott	1/2/3	0.0	0	0
Hiram Eugene	1/0/1	0.0	0	0

^{*} Completions/Attempts ^{a} Carries ^{b} Long play ^{c} Receptions ^{t} Tackles ^{g} Forced Fumble

Still looking for a win the 49ers played on home ground where they played their state rival, the Oakland Raiders. In the first quarter, the 49ers trailed early as kicker Sebastian Janikowski got a 27-yard field goal. Then he made a 24-yard field goal in the 2nd quarter. The 49ers replied with kicker Joe Nedney making a 25-yard field goal. They took the lead in the third quarter with QB Alex Smith making a 32-yard TD pass to WR Michael Crabtree. The Raiders cut the lead with Janikowski making a 40-yard field goal. The 49ers pulled away after Smith found TE Vernon Davis on a 17-yard TD pass.

With the win, the 49ers improve to 1–5.

=== Week 7: at Carolina Panthers ===
Week 7: San Francisco 49ers at Carolina Panthers – Game summary

Quarter	1	2	3	4	Total
49ers	7	3	0	10	20
Panthers	3	7	3	10	23

at Bank of America Stadium, Charlotte, North Carolina

- Date: October 24
- Game time: 1:00 pm. EDT/10:00 am. PDT
- Game weather: 75 °F (24 °C) (Sunny)
- Game attendance: 72,741
- Referee: Ron Winter
- TV announcers (Fox): Sam Rosen and Tim Ryan
- Recap

Game information

First quarter

- SF – Vernon Davis 1-yard pass from Alex Smith (Joe Nedney kick), 49ers 7–0, Drive: 4 plays, 74 yards, 1:42.
- CAR – John Kasay 47-yard field goal, 49ers 7–3, Drive: 10 plays, 36 yards, 4:46.

Second quarter

- SF – Joe Nedney 24-yard field goal, 49ers 10–3, Drive: 8 plays, 50 yards, 3:49.
- CAR – David Gettis 18-yard pass from Matt Moore (John Kasay kick), Tied 10–10, Drive: 10 plays, 80 yards, 6:16.

Third quarter

- CAR – John Kasay 55-yard field goal, Panthers 13–10, Drive: 8 plays, 20 yards, 3:58.

Fourth quarter

- SF – Joe Nedney 38-yard field goal, Tied 13–13, Drive: 8 plays, 39 yards, 4:14.
- SF – Ray McDonald 31-yard interception return (Joe Nedney kick), 49ers 20–13.
- CAR – David Gettis 23-yard pass from Matt Moore (John Kasay kick), Tied 20–20, Drive: 8 plays, 63 yards, 2:37.
- CAR – John Kasay 37-yard field goal, Panthers 23–20, Drive: 5 plays, 38 yards, 0:29.

Top passers

- SF – Alex Smith – 9/19, 129 yards, 1 touchdown
- CAR – Matt Moore – 28/41, 308 yards, 2 touchdowns, 1 interception

Top rushers

- SF – Frank Gore – 19 rushes, 102 yards
- CAR – DeAngelo Williams – 19 rushes, 44 yards

Top receivers

- SF – Vernon Davis – 4 receptions, 74 yards
- CAR – David Gettis – 8 receptions, 125 yards, 2 touchdowns

Top tacklers

- SF – Patrick Willis – 8 tackles, 3 assists
- CAR – James Anderson – 6 tackles, 1 assist

Coming off their win over the Raiders the 49ers flew to Bank of America Stadium for an NFC duel with the Panthers. In the first quarter the 49ers took the lead as QB Alex Smith got a 1-yard TD pass to TE Vernon Davis. The lead was cut when kicker John Kasay nailed a 47-yard field goal. The 49ers scored with kicker Joe Nedney making a 24-yard field goal. The Panthers tied the game with QB Matt Moore completing an 18-yard TD pass to WR David Gettis. The 49ers fell behind in the third quarter with Kasay booting a 55-yard field goal. They eventually got the lead back in the fourth quarter with Nedney hitting a 38-yard field goal, and with DE Ray McDonald returning an interception 31 yards for a touchdown. However, the Panthers tied the game with Moore finding Gettis again on a 23-yard TD pass. Following an interception by 49ers backup quarterback David Carr, Kasay successfully booted a 37-yard field goal to give the 49ers the loss.

With the loss, the 49ers fell to 1–6.

=== Week 8: vs. Denver Broncos (International Series) ===
Week 8: Denver Broncos at San Francisco 49ers – Game summary

Quarter	1	2	3	4	Total
Broncos	0	0	7	9	16
49ers	3	0	0	21	24

at Wembley Stadium, London, England

- Date: October 31
- Game time: 5:00 p.m. GMT/10:00 am. PDT
- Game weather: 54 °F (12 °C) (Mostly Cloudy)
- Game attendance: 83,941
- Referee: Scott Green
- TV announcers (CBS): Greg Gumbel and Dan Dierdorf
- Recap

Game information

First quarter

- SF – Joe Nedney 34-yard field goal, 49ers 3–0, Drive: 13 plays, 65 yards, 7:31.

Second quarter

- No scoring plays

Third quarter

- DEN – Tim Tebow 1-yard run (Matt Prater kick), Broncos 7–3, Drive: 5 plays, 89 yards, 2:15.

Fourth quarter

- DEN – Matt Prater 32-yard field goal, Broncos 10–3, Drive: 7 plays, 44 yards, 2:11.
- SF – Troy Smith 1-yard run (Joe Nedney kick), Tied 10–10, Drive: 5 plays, 56 yards, 2:22.
- SF – Michael Crabtree 28-yard pass from Troy Smith (Joe Nedney kick), 49ers 17–10, Drive: 4 plays, 48 yards, 2:11.
- SF – Frank Gore 3-yard run (Joe Nedney kick), 49ers 24–10, Drive: 6 plays, 18 yards, 3:20.
- DEN – Brandon Lloyd 1-yard pass from Kyle Orton (kick failed, wl), 49ers 24–16, Drive: 7 plays, 78 yards, 1:28.

Top passers

- DEN – Kyle Orton – 28/40, 370 yards, 1 touchdown, 1 interception
- SF – Troy Smith – 12/19, 196 yards, 1 touchdown

Top rushers

- DEN – Knowshon Moreno – 11 rushes, 40 yards
- SF – Frank Gore – 29 rushes, 118 yards, 1 touchdown

Top receivers

- DEN – Brandon Lloyd – 7 receptions, 169 yards, 1 touchdown
- SF – Delanie Walker – 5 receptions, 85 yards

Top tacklers

- DEN – D.J. Williams – 9 tackles
- SF – Patrick Willis – 8 tackles, 1 assist

The 49ers' 8th match was an Interconference duel with the Broncos at Wembley Stadium. In the first quarter the 49ers took the lead as kicker Joe Nedney got a 34-yard field goal. They soon trailed in the third quarter when QB Tim Tebow scrambled 1 yard for a touchdown; followed in the fourth quarter by kicker Matt Prater hitting a 32-yard field goal. They soon went on a scoring rally to take the lead with QB Troy Smith scrambling a yard for a touchdown, followed by his 28-yard TD pass to WR Michael Crabtree. Then RB Frank Gore got a 3-yard TD run to put the 49ers up 24–10. The lead was narrowed when QB Kyle Orton made a 1-yard TD pass to WR Brandon Lloyd (with a failed PAT).

With the win, the 49ers went into their bye week at 2–6.

=== Week 10: vs. St. Louis Rams ===
Week 10: St. Louis Rams at San Francisco 49ers – Game summary

Quarter	1	2	3	4	OT	Total
Rams	3	7	7	3	0	20
49ers	7	3	0	10	3	23

at Candlestick Park, San Francisco, California

- Date: November 14
- Game time: 1:15 pm. PST
- Game weather: 74 °F (23 °C) (Sunny)
- Game attendance: 69,732
- Referee: Ed Hochuli
- TV announcers (Fox): Sam Rosen, Tim Ryan and Chris Myers
- Recap

Game information

First quarter

- STL – Josh Brown 42-yard field goal, Rams 3–0, Drive: 8 plays, 54 yards, 5:25.
- SF – Frank Gore 1-yard run (Joe Nedney kick), 49ers 7–3, Drive: 3 plays, 66 yards, 1:39.

Second quarter

- SF – Joe Nedney 26-yard field goal, 49ers 10–3, Drive: 8 plays, 75 yards, 2:57.
- STL – Danny Amendola 5-yard pass from Sam Bradford (Josh Brown kick), Tied 10–10, Drive: 6 plays, 67 yards, 2:56.

Third quarter

- STL – Steven Jackson 13-yard run (Josh Brown kick), Rams 17–10, Drive: 7 plays, 64 yards, 3:22.

Fourth quarter

- SF – Joe Nedney 47-yard field goal, Rams 17–13, Drive: 7 plays, 44 yards, 2:45.
- SF – Michael Crabtree 16-yard pass from Troy Smith (Joe Nedney kick), 49ers 20–17, Drive: 6 plays, 76 yards, 2:02.
- STL – Josh Brown 33-yard field goal, Tied 20–20, Drive: 11 plays, 70 yards, 2:10.

Overtime

- SF – Joe Nedney 29-yard field goal, 49ers 23–20, Drive: 6 plays, 55 yards, 3:18.

Top passers

- STL – Sam Bradford – 30/42, 251 yards, 1 touchdown
- SF – Troy Smith – 17/28, 356 yards, 1 touchdown

Top rushers

- STL – Steven Jackson – 20 rushes, 81 yards, 1 touchdown
- SF – Frank Gore – 22 rushes, 87 yards, 1 touchdown

Top receivers

- STL – Brandon Gibson – 8 receptions, 72 yards
- SF – Delanie Walker – 4 receptions, 80 yards

Top tacklers

- STL – Craig Dahl – 10 tackles, 3 assists
- SF – Patrick Willis – 8 tackles, 3 assists, 1.0 sack, 1 forced fumble

The 49ers' ninth game was rivalry match against the Rams at home. In the first quarter the 49ers trailed early with kicker Josh Brown making a 42-yard field goal. They took the lead with RB Frank Gore getting a 1-yard TD run. This was followed in the second quarter by kicker Joe Nedney nailing a 26-yard field goal. The Rams fought back with QB Sam Bradford completing a 5-yard TD pass to WR Danny Amendola. Followed in the third quarter by RB Steven Jackson getting a 13-yard TD run. The 49ers got the lead back with Nedney getting a 47-yard field goal, followed by QB Troy Smith making a 16-yard TD pass to WR Michael Crabtree. The Rams tied the game with Brown making a 33-yard field goal. The decision was made at overtime when Nedney successfully made a 29-yard field goal to give the 49ers their third win of the season, bringing their record up to 3–6.

=== Week 11: vs. Tampa Bay Buccaneers ===
Week 11: Tampa Bay Buccaneers at San Francisco 49ers – Game summary

Quarter	1	2	3	4	Total
Buccaneers	0	7	7	7	21
49ers	0	0	0	0	0

at Candlestick Park, San Francisco, California

- Date: November 21
- Game time: 1:05 pm. PST
- Game weather: 54 °F (12 °C) (Cloudy)
- Game attendance: 69,732
- Referee: John Parry
- TV announcers (Fox): Chris Myers and Kurt Warner
- Recap

Game information

First quarter

- No scoring plays

Second quarter

- TB – Cadillac Williams 6-yard run (Connor Barth kick), Buccaneers 7–0, Drive: 14 plays, 80 yards, 7:31.

Third quarter

- TB – Mike Williams 8-yard pass from Josh Freeman (Connor Barth kick), Buccaneers 14–0, Drive: 5 plays, 66 yards, 2:55.

Fourth quarter

- TB – Donald Penn 1-yard pass from Josh Freeman (Connor Barth kick), Buccaneers 21–0, Drive: 4 plays, 7 yards, 2:17.

Top passers

- TB – Josh Freeman – 13/20, 136 yards, 2 touchdowns
- SF – Troy Smith – 16/31, 148 yards, 1 interception

Top rushers

- TB – LeGarrette Blount – 26 rushes, 82 yards
- SF – Troy Smith – 5 rushes, 45 yards

Top receivers

- TB – Mike Williams – 3 receptions, 54 yards, 1 touchdown
- SF – Josh Morgan – 4 receptions, 51 yards

Top tacklers

- TB – Cody Grimm – 5 tackles, 2 assists
- SF – Patrick Willis – 9 tackles, 4 assists, 2.0 sacks

Coming off their win over the Rams the 49ers played on home ground for an NFC duel with the Buccaneers. In the second quarter the 49ers trailed after RB Cadillac Williams made a 6-yard TD run. This was followed in the third quarter by QB Josh Freeman completing an 8-yard TD pass to WR Mike Williams; and in the fourth quarter by Freeman throwing a 1-yard TD pass to Donald Penn.

With the loss, the 49ers fell to 3–7. This marked the 49ers' first shutout loss at home since 1977, when they were defeated by the Atlanta Falcons 7–0.

=== Week 12: at Arizona Cardinals ===
Week 12: San Francisco 49ers at Arizona Cardinals – Game summary

Quarter	1	2	3	4	Total
49ers	14	7	3	3	27
Cardinals	3	3	0	0	6

at University of Phoenix Stadium, Glendale, Arizona

- Date: November 29
- Game time: 6:30 pm. MST/5:30 pm. PST
- Game weather: None (Dome Closed)
- Game attendance: 62,308
- Referee: Gene Steratore
- TV announcers (ESPN): Mike Tirico, Ron Jaworski, Jon Gruden, Suzy Kolber, & Michele Tafoya
- Recap

Game information

First quarter

- SF – Michael Crabtree 38-yard pass from Troy Smith (Shane Andrus kick), 49ers 7–0, Drive: 1 plays, 38 yards, 0:07.
- ARI – Jay Feely 31-yard field goal, 49ers 7–3, Drive: 7 plays, 55 yards, 3:39.
- SF – Anthony Dixon 1-yard run (Shane Andrus kick), 49ers 14–3, Drive: 10 plays, 55 yards, 5:27.

Second quarter

- SF – Brian Westbrook 8-yard run (Shane Andrus kick), 49ers 21–3, Drive: 6 plays, 42 yards, 2:44.
- ARI – Jay Feely 39-yard field goal, 49ers 21–6, Drive: 10 plays, 40 yards, 5:07.

Third quarter

- SF – Shane Andrus 39-yard field goal, 49ers 24–6, Drive: 7 plays, 44 yards, 3:53.

Fourth quarter

- SF – Shane Andrus 26-yard field goal, 49ers 27–6, Drive: 11 plays, 42 yards, 4:03.

Top passers

- SF – Troy Smith – 11/23, 129 yards, 1 touchdowns, 1 interception
- ARI – Derek Anderson – 16/35, 196 yards, 1 interceptions

Top rushers

- SF – Brian Westbrook – 23 rushes, 136 yards, 1 touchdown
- ARI – Beanie Wells – 5 rushes, 13 yards

Top receivers

- SF – Michael Crabtree – 2 receptions, 48 yards, 1 touchdown
- ARI – Early Doucet – 5 receptions, 60 yards

Top tacklers

- SF – Patrick Willis – 4 tackles, 1 assist, 1.0 sack
- ARI – Paris Lenon – 7 tackles, 3 assists

Hoping to rebound from their shutout loss to the Buccaneers, the 49ers flew to the University of Phoenix Stadium for a Week 12 NFC West duel with the Arizona Cardinals on Monday night. San Francisco made the opening strike in the first quarter as quarterback Troy Smith found wide receiver Michael Crabtree on a 38-yard touchdown pass. The Cardinals answered with kicker Jay Feely getting a 31-yard field goal, yet the 49ers responded with a 1-yard touchdown run from rookie running back Anthony Dixon. San Francisco added onto their lead in the second quarter with an 8-yard touchdown pass from running back Brian Westbrook. Arizona would hang on with Feely's 39-yard field goal. Afterwards, the 49ers pulled away with a 38-yard field goal in the third quarter and a 26-yard field goal in the fourth quarter from kicker Shane Andrus.

With the win, San Francisco improved to 4–7.

=== Week 13: at Green Bay Packers ===
Week Thirteen: San Francisco 49ers at Green Bay Packers – Game summary

Quarter	1	2	3	4	Total
49ers	3	10	3	0	16
Packers	0	14	14	6	34

at Lambeau Field, Green Bay, Wisconsin

- Date: December 5
- Game time: 1:00 pm EST/10:00 am PST
- Game weather: 26 °F (−3 °C), Cloudy
- Game attendance: 70,575
- Referee: Bill Leavy
- TV announcers (Fox): Thom Brennaman and Brian Billick
- Recap

Game information

First quarter

- SF – Jeff Reed 44 yd. FG (SF 3–0)

Second quarter

- SF – Jeff Reed 26 yd. FG (SF 6–0)
- GB – Greg Jennings 57 yd. TD reception from Aaron Rodgers, M. Crosby XP good (GB 7–6)
- GB – John Kuhn 1 yd. TD run, M. Crosby XP good (GB 14–6)
- SF – Vernon Davis 66 yd. TD reception from Troy Smith, J. Reed XP good (GB 14–13)

Third quarter

- GB – Donald Driver 61 yd. TD reception from Aaron Rodgers, M. Crosby XP good (GB 21–13)
- SF – Jeff Reed 23 yd. FG (GB 21–16)
- GB – Greg Jennings 1 yd. TD reception from Aaron Rodgers, M. Crosby XP good (GB 28–16)

Fourth quarter

- GB – Mason Crosby 43 yd. FG (GB 31–16)
- GB – Mason Crosby 24 yd. FG (GB 34–16)

Top passers

- SF – Troy Smith – 10/25, 194 yards, 1 TD, 1 INT
- GB – Aaron Rodgers – 21/30, 298 yards, 3 TDs

Top rushers

- SF – Anthony Dixon – 9 carries, 33 yards
- GB – James Starks – 18 carries, 73 yards

Top receivers

- SF – Vernon Davis – 4 receptions, 126 yards, 1 TD
- GB – Greg Jennings – 6 receptions, 122 yards, 2 TDs

Top tacklers

- SF – Takeo Spikes – 13 tackles, 4 assists
- GB – Clay Matthews – 6 tackles

Coming off their win over the Cardinals the 49ers flew to Lambeau Field for an NFC duel with the Packers. The 49ers took the lead after kicker Jeff Reed hit a 44 and a 26-yard field goal. The lead didn't last long after QB Aaron Rodgers completed a 57-yard TD pass to WR Greg Jennings, followed by FB John Kuhn getting a 1-yard TD run. The 49ers cut the lead down with QB Troy Smith making a 66-yard TD pass to TE Vernon Davis, but in the third quarter, the Packers replied with Rodgers getting a 61-yard TD pass to WR Donald Driver. The 49ers scored again with Reed nailing a 23-yard field goal. They struggled further after Rodgers found Jennings again on a 1-yard TD pass. Followed in the fourth quarter by kicker Mason Crosby making a 43 and a 24-yard field goal.

With the loss, the 49ers fell to 4–8.

=== Week 14: vs. Seattle Seahawks ===
Week 14: Seattle Seahawks at San Francisco 49ers – Game summary

Quarter	1	2	3	4	Total
Seahawks	7	0	7	7	21
49ers	10	20	10	0	40

at Candlestick Park, San Francisco, California

- Date: December 12
- Game time: 1:05 pm. PST
- Game weather: 55 °F (13 °C) (Overcast)
- Game attendance: 69,732
- Referee: Carl Cheffers
- TV announcers (Fox): Thom Brennaman and Brian Billick
- Recap

Game information

First quarter

- SF – Vernon Davis 42-yard pass from Alex Smith (Jeff Reed kick), 49ers 7–0, Drive: 6 plays, 74 yards, 2:27.
- SEA – Ruvell Martin 11-yard pass from Matt Hasselbeck (Olindo Mare kick), Tied 7–7, Drive: 7 plays, 52 yards, 3:47.
- SF – Jeff Reed 33-yard field goal, 49ers 10–7, Drive: 9 plays, 59 yards, 4:14.

Second quarter

- SF – Jeff Reed 44-yard field goal, 49ers 13–7, Drive: 7 plays, 19 yards, 2:52.
- SF – Josh Morgan 15-yard pass from Alex Smith (Jeff Reed kick), 49ers 20–7, Drive: 3 plays, 17 yards, 0:55.
- SF – Brian Westbrook 62-yard pass from Alex Smith (Jeff Reed kick), 49ers 27–7, Drive: 3 plays, 68 yards, 1:14.
- SF – Jeff Reed 22-yard field goal, 49ers 30–7, Drive: 4 plays, 7 yards, 1:26.

Third quarter

- SF – Dashon Goldson 39-yard interception return (Jeff Reed kick), 49ers 37–7.
- SF – Jeff Reed 36-yard field goal, 49ers 40–7, Drive: 7 plays, 51 yards, 3:41.
- SEA – Leon Washington 92-yard kickoff return (Olindo Mare kick), 49ers 40–14, Drive: 0 plays, 0 yards, 0:14.

Fourth quarter

- SEA – Deon Butler 2-yard pass from Matt Hasselbeck (Olindo Mare kick), 49ers 40–21, Drive: 9 plays, 80 yards, 3:11.

Top passers

- SEA – Matt Hasselbeck – 27/42, 285 yards, 2 touchdowns, 4 interceptions
- SF – Alex Smith – 17/27, 255 yards, 3 touchdowns

Top rushers

- SEA – Michael Robinson – 3 rushes, 33 yards
- SF – Anthony Dixon – 14 rushes, 60 yards

Top receivers

- SEA – Ruvell Martin – 4 receptions, 73 yards, 1 touchdown
- SF – Brian Westbrook – 6 receptions, 87 yards, 1 touchdown

Top tacklers

- SEA – Aaron Curry – 6 tackles, 2 assists, 0.5 sack
- SF – Takeo Spikes – 6 tackles, 3 assists, 1 interception

Hoping to rebound from their loss to the Packers the 49ers played on home ground for an NFC West rivalry match against the Seahawks. The 49ers took the lead first with QB Alex Smith completing a 42-yard TD pass to TE Vernon Davis, but the Seahawks replied with QB Matt Hasselbeck throwing an 11-yard TD pass to WR Ruvell Martin. The 49ers made a large scoring rally to increase their lead when kicker Jeff Reed hit a 33 and a 44-yard field goal, followed by Smith completing a 15 and a 62-yard TD pass to Josh Morgan and Brian Westbrook respectively. This was followed by Reed making a 22-yard field goal, and in the third quarter with FS Dashon Goldson returning an interception 39 yards for a touchdown. After that, Reed nailed a 36-yard field goal to put the 49ers up 40–7. The lead was broken down with RB Leon Washington returning the kickoff 92 yards for a touchdown, followed in the 4th quarter by QB Matt Hasselbeck getting a 2-yard TD pass to WR Deon Butler.

With the win, the 49ers improved to 5–8.

=== Week 15: at San Diego Chargers ===
Week 15: San Francisco 49ers at San Diego Chargers – Game summary

Quarter	1	2	3	4	Total
49ers	0	0	0	7	7
Chargers	7	10	7	10	34

at Qualcomm Stadium, San Diego, California

- Date: December 16
- Game time: 5:20 pm. PST
- Game weather: 56 °F (13 °C) (Partly Cloudy)
- Game attendance: 67,820
- Referee: Clete Blakeman
- TV announcers (NFLN): Bob Papa, Matt Millen and Joe Theismann
- Recap

Game information

First quarter

- SD – Vincent Jackson 58-yard pass from Philip Rivers (Nate Kaeding kick), Chargers 7–0, Drive: 4 plays, 74 yards, 2:07.

Second quarter

- SD – Nate Kaeding 25-yard field goal, Chargers 10–0, Drive: 13 plays, 90 yards, 7:00.
- SD – Vincent Jackson 11-yard pass from Philip Rivers (Nate Kaeding kick), Chargers 17–0, Drive: 7 plays, 87 yards, 2:49.

Third quarter

- SD – Mike Tolbert 1-yard run (Nate Kaeding kick), Chargers 24–0, Drive: 14 plays, 58 yards, 8:12.

Fourth quarter

- SD – Vincent Jackson 21-yard pass from Philip Rivers (Nate Kaeding kick), Chargers 31–0, Drive: 10 plays, 69 yards, 6:16.
- SD – Nate Kaeding 39-yard field goal, Chargers 34–0, Drive: 5 plays, 14 yards, 1:56.
- SF – Brian Westbrook 3-yard run (Jeff Reed kick), Chargers 34–7, Drive: 6 plays, 70 yards, 3:12.

Top passers

- SF – Alex Smith – 19/29, 165 yards, 1 interception
- SD – Philip Rivers – 19/25, 273 yards, 3 touchdowns

Top rushers

- SF – Anthony Dixon – 6 rushes, 33 yards
- SD – Ryan Mathews – 17 rushes, 56 yards

Top receivers

- SF – Josh Morgan – 7 receptions, 106 yards
- SD – Vincent Jackson – 5 receptions, 112 yards, 3 touchdowns

Top tacklers

- SF – Takeo Spikes – 7 tackles, 5 assists
- SD – Kevin Burnett – 8 tackles, 1 sack

Coming off their win over the Seahawks the 49ers played against the Chargers at Qualcomm Stadium on Thursday Night. The 49ers fell behind 2 minutes into the game with QB Philip Rivers throwing a 58-yard TD pass to WR Vincent Jackson, followed in the second quarter by kicker Nate Kaeding nailing a 25-yard field goal, then with Rivers finding Jackson on an 11-yard touchdown pass. In the third quarter the 49ers had a touchdown from the second-half kickoff return but was declined because of a face-masking penalty enforced on them. Following that, they struggled further with FB Mike Tolbert getting a 1-yard TD run, followed by Rivers connecting to Jackson on a 48-yard TD pass, then with Kaeding hitting a 39-yard field goal. The 49ers made their only score of the game with RB Brian Westbrook getting a 1-yard TD run. Justin Smith was ejected from the game after shoving a referee.

With the loss, the 49ers fell to 5–9.

=== Week 16: at St. Louis Rams ===
Week 16: San Francisco 49ers at St. Louis Rams – Game summary

Quarter	1	2	3	4	Total
49ers	0	14	0	3	17
Rams	9	3	3	10	25

at Edward Jones Dome, St. Louis, Missouri

- Date: December 26
- Game time: 12:00 pm. CST/10:00 am. PST
- Game weather: None (dome stadium)
- Game attendance: 52,820
- Referee: Pete Morelli
- TV announcers (Fox): Kenny Albert, Daryl Johnston and Tony Siragusa
- Recap

Game information

First quarter

- STL – Steven Jackson 1-yard run (Josh Brown kick), Rams 7–0, Drive: 7 plays, 71 yards, 3:39.
- STL – Troy Smith tackled in end zone by James Hall for a Safety, Rams 9–0

Second quarter

- SF – Ted Ginn Jr. 78-yard punt return (Jeff Reed kick), Rams 9–7.
- STL – Josh Brown 43-yard field goal, Rams 12–7, Drive: 8 plays, 36 yards, 3:44.
- SF – Michael Crabtree 60-yard pass from Troy Smith (Jeff Reed kick), 49ers 14–12, Drive: 6 plays, 80 yards, 3:10.

Third quarter

- STL – Josh Brown 30-yard field goal, Rams 15–14, Drive: 8 plays, 29 yards, 2:51.

Fourth quarter

- STL – Laurent Robinson 3-yard pass from Sam Bradford (Josh Brown kick), Rams 22–14, Drive: 4 plays, 68 yards, 1:47.
- SF – Jeff Reed 47-yard field goal, Rams 22–17, Drive: 7 plays, 52 yards, 3:55.
- STL – Josh Brown 28-yard field goal, Rams 25–17, Drive: 4 plays, 2 yards, 1:50.

Top passers

- SF – Troy Smith – 7/19, 153 yards, 1 touchdown, 1 interception
- STL – Sam Bradford – 28/37, 292 yards, 1 touchdown

Top rushers

- SF – Brian Westbrook – 10 rushes, 40 yards
- STL – Steven Jackson – 24 rushes, 48 yards, 1 touchdown

Top receivers

- SF – Michael Crabtree – 6 receptions, 122 yards, 1 touchdown
- STL – Danario Alexander – 6 receptions, 99 yards

Top tacklers

- SF – Patrick Willis – 12 tackles, 1.0 sack, 1 forced fumble
- STL – James Hall – 6 tackles, 2 assists, 1.5 sack, 2 forced fumbles

The 49ers' fifteenth game was an NFC West rivalry rematch against the Rams at Edward Jones Dome. The 49ers struggled in the first quarter when Steven Jackson got a 1-yard TD run, followed by QB Troy Smith getting sacked in the endzone by DE James Hall for a safety. They got back in the game after Ted Ginn Jr. returned a punt 78 yards for a touchdown, but fell further behind after kicker Josh Brown nailed a 43-yard field goal. They took the lead with Smith completing a 60-yard TD pass to WR Michael Crabtree, but fell behind again as Brown got a 30-yard field goal, followed by QB Sam Bradford throwing a 3-yard TD pass to WR Laurent Robinson. The 49ers tried to cut this lead with kicker Jeff Reed making a 47-yard field goal, but the Rams pulled away with Brown hitting a 28-yard field goal.

With the loss, the 49ers fell to 5–10, eliminating them from post-season contention for the eighth consecutive season. As a result of this and a sideline argument during the game, Singletary was fired as head coach later that night.

=== Week 17: vs. Arizona Cardinals ===
Week 17: Arizona Cardinals at San Francisco 49ers – Game summary

Quarter	1	2	3	4	Total
Cardinals	0	7	0	0	7
49ers	7	3	21	7	38

at Candlestick Park, San Francisco, California

- Date: January 2
- Game time: 1:15 pm. PST
- Referee: Mike Carey
- TV announcers (Fox): Chris Myers and Jim Mora

Game information

First quarter

Second quarter

Third quarter

Fourth quarter

Top passers

- ARI –
- SF –

Top rushers

- ARI –
- SF –

Top receivers

- ARI –
- SF –

Top tacklers

- ARI –
- SF –

The 49ers' final game was an NFC West rematch against the Cardinals. The 49ers took the lead as QB Alex Smith completed a 37-yard TD pass to WR Ted Ginn Jr., followed in the 2nd quarter by kicker Jeff Reed making a 39-yard field goal. The Cardinals narrowed the lead as QB John Skelton completed a 10-yard TD pass to WR Larry Fitzgerald, but the 49ers extended their lead after Smith completed a 59-yard TD pass to TE Vernon Davis, followed by RB Brian Westbrook running 6 yards to the endzone for a touchdown twice in succession. This was followed by CB Tarell Brown returning an interception 62 yards for a touchdown.

With the win, the 49ers finish with a 6–10 record.
