= Nate Clements =

American football player (born 1979)

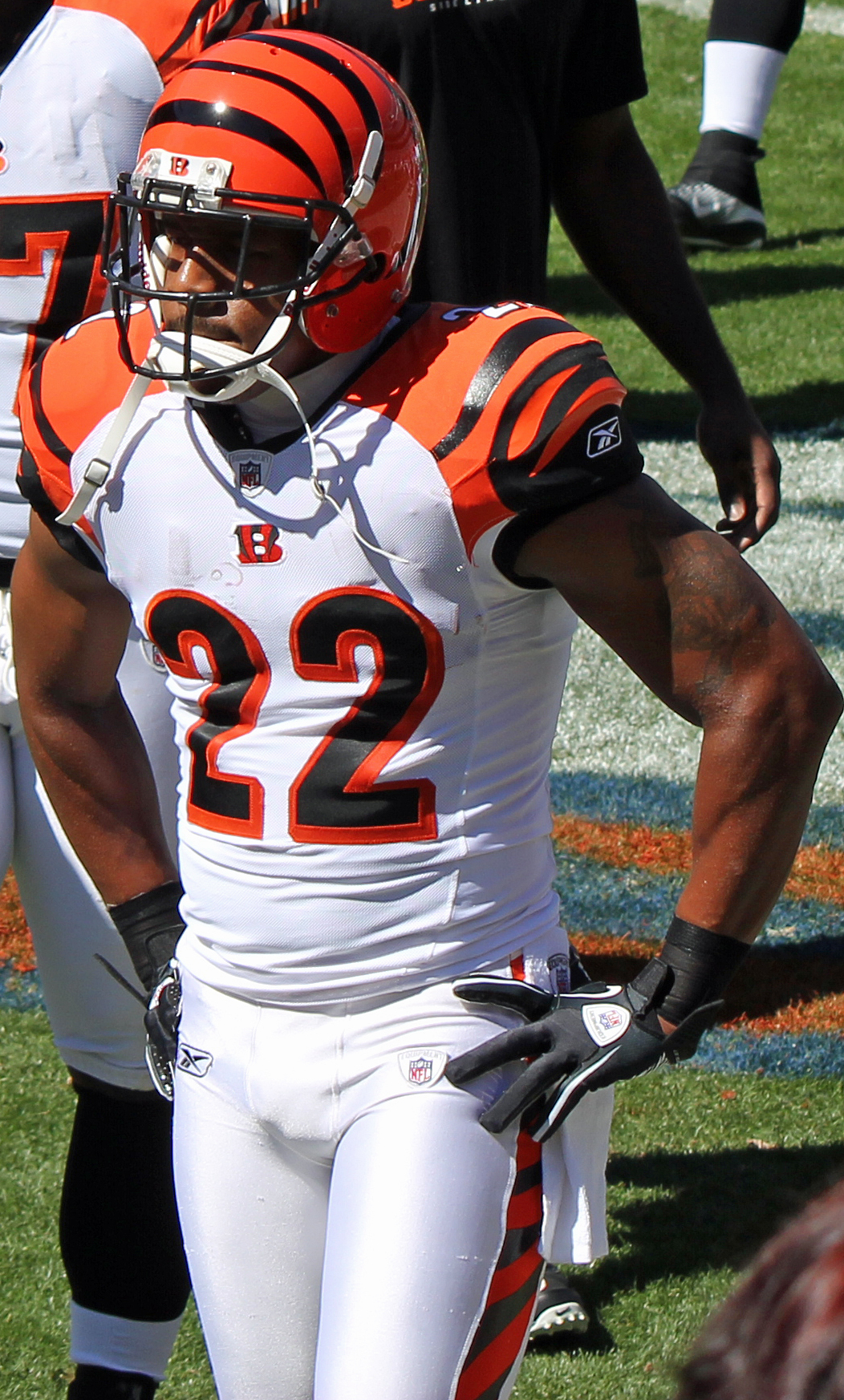
- Clements with the Cincinnati Bengals in 2011

No. 22
- Position: Cornerback

Personal information
- Born: December 12, 1979 (age 46); Shaker Heights, Ohio, U.S.
- Listed height: 6 ft 0 in (1.83 m)
- Listed weight: 205 lb (93 kg)

Career information
- High school: Shaker Heights
- College: Ohio State (1998–2000)
- NFL draft: 2001: 1st round, 21st overall pick

Career history
- Buffalo Bills (2001–2006); San Francisco 49ers (2007–2010); Cincinnati Bengals (2011–2012)

Awards and highlights
- Pro Bowl (2004); Third-team All-American (2000); First-team All-Big Ten (2000)

Career NFL statistics
- Total tackles: 826
- Forced fumbles: 23
- Fumble recoveries: 8
- Interceptions: 36
- Return yards: 1,462
- Total touchdowns: 9
- Stats at Pro Football Reference

Nathan D. Clements (born December 12, 1979) is an American former professional football player who was a cornerback in the National Football League (NFL). He played college football for the Ohio State Buckeyes. He was selected by the Buffalo Bills in the first round of the 2001 NFL draft with the 21st overall pick, and also played for the San Francisco 49ers and Cincinnati Bengals.

== Early life ==
Clements was born to Nathan Clements Sr. and Emma Clements in Shaker Heights, Ohio and graduated from Shaker Heights High School. Nate's father was strict and did not allow Nate to date while in high school. Clements excelled at both defensive back and quarterback and was named an All-American by USA Today, Blue Chip Illustrated and Super Prep.

Clements was also named first-team All-Ohio during a season in which he had seven interceptions, including one returned for a touchdown. He also returned two kicks for touchdowns. Clements led the Raiders to a playoff berth in 1997 and led them past a Euclid Panther team that featured Notre Dame back Tony Fisher. Clements also holds the Shaker record for career interceptions with 14. The school retired his number 20 jersey in 2005.

== College career ==
Clements attended Ohio State University. Clements started 24 of 36 games and recorded 177 career tackles and seven interceptions. As a junior, he intercepted four passes and racked up 470 yards returning punts, with an average of 13.1 yards per return. In 2000 he was an All-Big Ten Conference first-team choice. After his junior year Clements decided to forgo his senior season and declared himself eligible for the NFL draft. He majored in general studies.

== Professional career ==
Clements declared for the 2001 NFL draft and was regarded as one of the top prospects. Prior to his junior season, Clements was ranked as the second best cornerback in the upcoming draft by NFL draft analyst Mel Kiper Jr. and was also ranked as the 23rd overall prospect regardless of position by Mel Kiper Jr. He attended the NFL Scouting Combine in Indianapolis, Indiana, but opted to only perform the bench press and 40-yard dash. At the conclusion of the pre-draft process, Clements was projected to be a first round pick by NFL draft experts and scouts. He was ranked as the top cornerback prospect by DraftScout.com.

Pre-draft measurables
Height	Weight	40-yard dash	Bench press
5 ft 11 1/8 in (1.81 m)	209 lb (95 kg)	4.37 s	20 reps
All values from NFL Combine

=== Buffalo Bills ===
The Buffalo Bills selected Clements in the first round (21st overall) of the 2001 NFL draft. Clements was the first cornerback drafted in 2001.

==== 2001 ====
On July 27, 2001, the Buffalo Bills signed Clements to a five-year, $6.70 million contract that includes $3.17 million guaranteed.

Throughout training camp, Clements competed to be a starting cornerback against Lance Brown, Ken Irvin, and Jimmy Williams. Head coach Gregg Williams named Clements the third cornerback on the depth chart to begin the regular season, behind Antoine Winfield and Ken Irvin. He was also named the starting kick returner to begin his rookie season.

He made his professional regular season debut in the Buffalo Bills' season-opener against the New Orleans Saints and recorded one solo tackle in their 24–6 loss. On September 23, 2001, Clements made one tackle, deflected a pass, and returned his first career interception for a touchdown during their 42–26 loss at the Indianapolis Colts. He intercepted a pass by quarterback Peyton Manning and returned it for a 61-yard touchdown in the third quarter to mark the first score of his career. On October 18, 2001, Clements earned his first career start after he surpassed Ken Irvin on the depth chart. He recorded three solo tackles and broke up a pass in the Bills' 13–10 win at the Jacksonville Jaguars in Week 5. In Week 8, Clements collected three combined tackles, deflected a pass, and returned a punt for a 66-yard touchdown during the second quarter of a 30–24 loss to the Indianapolis Colts. In Week 14, he collected three combined tackles and made his first career sack on quarterback Tom Brady during a 12–9 loss at the New England Patriots. On December 23, 2001, Clements collected a season-high 11 solo tackles, a season-high three pass deflections, and intercepted a pass by Michael Vick in the Bills' 33–30 loss at the Atlanta Falcons in Week 15. He completed his rookie season in 2001 with 63 combined tackles (53 solo), ten pass deflections, three interceptions, three forced fumbles, a sack, and a touchdown in 16 games and 11 starts. He also had 30 kick returns for 628-yards and four punt returns for 81-yards and a touchdown.

==== 2002 ====
Defensive coordinator Jerry Gray chose to retain Clements and Antoine Winfield as the starting cornerbacks in 2002. On October 20, 2002, he recorded four solo tackles, four pass deflections, three interceptions, and a touchdown during a 20–13 victory at the Miami Dolphins in Week 7. He intercepted three passes by quarterback Ray Lucas and returned an interception by Lucas for a 29-yard touchdown in the second quarter. In Week 12, Clements collected a season-high ten combined tackles (eight solo) and broke up a pass in the Bills' 31–13 loss at the New York Jets. On December 29, 2002, Clements had a season-high five pass deflections, nine combined tackles, and an interception during a 27–9 win against the Cincinnati Bengals in Week 17. Clements finished his second season with 65 combined tackles (52 solo), 13 pass deflections, a career-high six interceptions, and a touchdown 16 games and 16 starts.

==== 2003 ====
Head coach Gregg Williams retained Clements and Antoine Winfield as the starting cornerback tandem in 2003. On September 21, 2003, Clements recorded four solo tackles, two pass deflections, and two interceptions during a 17–7 loss at the Miami Dolphins in Week 3. He made both interceptions off pass attempts by Jay Fiedler and returned one for a 54-yard touchdown in the fourth quarter. In Week 5, he collected a season-high seven combined tackles and a pass deflection in the Bills' 22–16 victory against the Cincinnati Bengals. He finished the 2003 season with a total of 61 combined tackles (51 solo), four pass deflections, three interceptions, and a touchdown in 16 games and 16 starts. He also returned 14 punts for 137 yards in 2003.

==== 2004 ====
The Buffalo Bills chose not to renew Gregg Williams after finishing with a 6–10 record and not qualifying for the playoffs for a third consecutive season. The Buffalo Bills' new head coach Mike Mularkey retained Clements as a starting cornerback to begin the season, along with newly acquired free agent Troy Vincent. In Week 2, Clements collected a season-high seven solo tackles during a 13–10 loss at the Oakland Raiders. On October 31, 2004, he recorded a season-high nine combined tackles and was credited with half a tackle in a 38–14 victory against the Arizona Cardinals. On November 21, 2004, Clements recorded five combined tackles, broke up a pass, and returned a punt for a touchdown for the first time in his career during a 37–17 victory against the St. Louis Rams. He returned a punt by Sean Landeta for an 85-yard touchdown in the third quarter. In Week 17, he recorded five solo tackles, a pass deflection, and returned an interception by rookie quarterback Ben Roethlisberger for a 30-yard touchdown in the Bills' 29–24 loss to the Pittsburgh Steelers. The touchdown extended his streak to four consecutive seasons with a pick six. He completed the 2004 season with 73 combined tackles (53 solo), seven pass deflections, a career-high six interceptions, a touchdown, and was credited with half a sack in 16 games and 16 starts. Clements also had 35 punt returns for 327-yards and a touchdown.

On January 28, 2005, Clements was named as a late replacement to the 2005 Pro Bowl. He replaced Kansas City Chiefs' cornerback Patrick Surtain who was himself replacing Baltimore Ravens' Chris McAlister. Both players were unavailable to play due to injuries.

==== 2005 ====
Head coach Mike Mularkey retained Clements as a starting cornerback in 2005, along with Terrence McGee. On November 20, 2005, Clements collected a season-high 11 combined tackles (nine solo) during a 48–10 loss at the San Diego Chargers in Week 11. In Week 14, he tied his season-high of 11 combined tackles (nine solo), deflected a pass, and made an interception in the Bills' 35–7 loss to the New England Patriots. He completed the 2005 season with 99 combined tackles (78 solo), 13 pass deflections, three forced fumbles, and two interceptions in 16 games and 16 starts.

==== 2006 ====
On January 13, 2006, Buffalo Bills' head coach Mike Mularkey unexpectedly resigned from his role after a 5–11 campaign in 2005. On February 22, 2006, the Buffalo Bills' general manager Marv Levy announced that the Bills would apply their franchise tag to Clements for the 2006 season. On May 7, 2006, Clements signed a one-year, $7.20 million tender to remain with the Buffalo Bills. The Buffalo Bills' new head coach, Dick Jauron, officially named Clements the No. 1 starting cornerback entering the regular season, alongside Terrence McGee.

On November 5, 2006, Clements collected a season-high nine combined tackles and deflected a pass during a 24–10 win against the Green Bay Packers. In Week 11, he made four combined tackles, a season-high three pass deflections, and an interception during a 24–21 win at the Houston Texans. In Week 14, Clements collected five combined tackles, a pass deflection, and returned an interception for a 58-yard touchdown in the Bills' 31–13 win at the New York Jets in Week 14. He finished the season with 70 combined tackles (54 solo), a career-high 16 pass deflections, three interceptions, two forced fumbles, and a touchdown in 16 games and 16 starts.

=== San Francisco 49ers ===
==== 2007 ====
On March 2, 2007, the San Francisco 49ers signed Clements to an eight-year, $80 million contract with $22 million guaranteed. The contract made him the highest paid defensive player in league history in 2007.

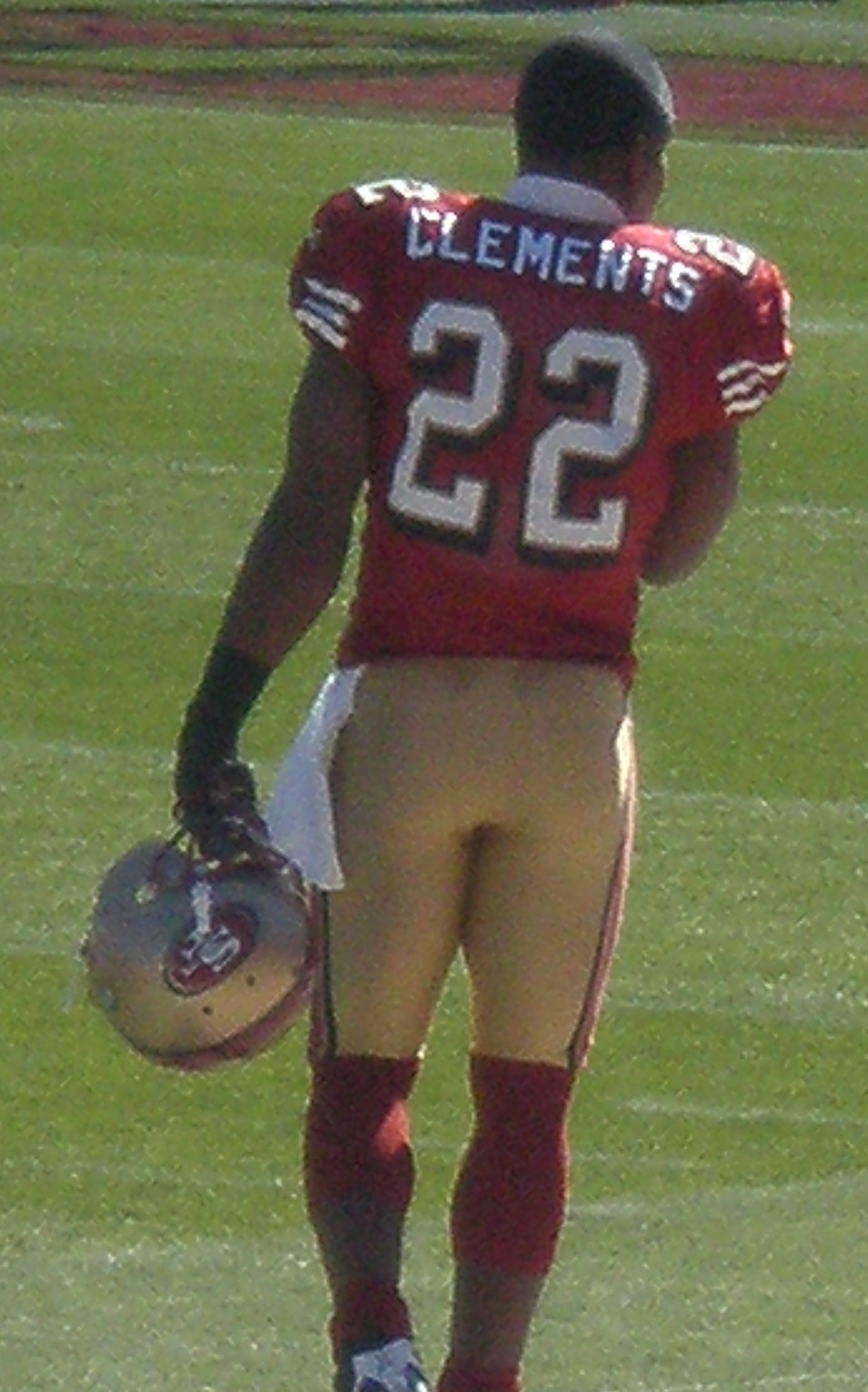
Clements on the field prior to a game against the Philadelphia Eagles on October 12, 2008

Clements became part of a revamped secondary that finished 27th in passing yards the previous season. Head coach Mike Nolan officially named Clements the No. 1 starting cornerback to start the season, along with cornerback Walt Harris and safeties Michael Lewis and Mark Roman.

In Week 2, Clements collected six solo tackles and sacked quarterback Marc Bulger in the 49ers' 17–16 win at the St. Louis Rams. On November 25, 2007, Clements collected a season-high ten combined tackles (eight solo) and a pass deflection during a 37–31 victory at the Arizona Cardinals in Week 13. On December 23, 2007, he recorded seven combined tackles, a pass deflection, and an interception during a 21–19 victory against the Tampa Bay Buccaneers. Clements finished the season with 92 combined tackles (77 solo), 14 pass deflections, four interceptions, three forced fumbles, and a sack in 16 games and 16 starts.

==== 2008 ====
Defensive coordinator Greg Manusky retained Clements and Walt Harris as the starting cornerbacks in 2008. On September 14, 2008, Clements collected a season-high seven solo tackles and deflected a pass in a 33–30 win at the Seattle Seahawks in Week 2. On October 19, 2008, he recorded five combined tackles, a pass deflection, and returned a blocked field goal for a touchdown during the 49ers' 29–17 loss to the New York Giants. Clements recovered the ball and returned it 74-yards for a touchdown in the third quarter after linebacker Manny Lawson blocked a field goal attempt by Giants' kicker John Carney. On October 21, 2008, the San Francisco 49ers fired head coach Mike Nolan after they fell to a 2–5 record. Assistant head coach/linebackers coach Mike Singletary was named the interim head coach for the remaining ten games. In Week 13, he collected six solo tackles during a 10–3 win at his former team, the Buffalo Bills. During the game, Clements injured his thumb and was inactive for the 49ers' Week 14 victory against the New York Jets. This became the first time in Clement's professional career that he was inactive. His injury ended his streaks of 119 consecutive game appearances and 115 consecutive starts. In Week 17, Clements tied his season-high of seven solo tackles and also deflected a pass in a 27–24 win at the Washington Redskins. Clements finished the 2008 season with 63 combined tackles (56 solo), nine passes defensed, two interceptions, and a forced fumble in 15 games and 15 starts.

==== 2009 ====
The San Francisco 49ers' new head coach, Mike Singletary, officially named Clements the No. 1 cornerback to start the 2009 regular season, opposite Tarell Brown. He started in the San Francisco 49ers' season-opener at the Arizona Cardinals and five combined tackles, a pass deflection, and an interception in their 20–16 victory. The following week, Clements made six combined tackles and a season-high four pass deflections during a 23–10 win against the Seattle Seahawks in Week 2. On September 27, 2009, Clements recorded four combined tackles and returned a blocked field goal for a touchdown in the 49ers' 27–24 loss at the Minnesota Vikings. Clements recovered the ball and returned it for a 59-yard touchdown after it kicker Ryan Longwell's attempt was blocked by Ray McDonald in the second quarter. He joined Kevin Ross as the only players in NFL history return a blocked field goal for a touchdown on two separate occasions. On November 1, 2009, Clements suffered a right shoulder injury in the first quarter of a Week 8 loss at the Indianapolis Colts and exited the game. He sustained the injury after he was tackled by Philip Wheeler and Jerraud Powers while returning a punt in the second quarter. Many media members called into question head coach Mike Singletary's decision to place Clements in the punt return role due to his substantial contract and importance in the secondary. Clements took over punt return duties from Arnaz Battle who had disappointing performances after replacing recently released Pro Bowl return specialist Allen Rossum. Former head coach Mike Nolan was asked upon Clements signing about the possibility of Clements returning punt and immediately rejected the idea stating, "Not even maybe." On November 3, 2009, it was reported that Clements sustained a broken right scapula to his right shoulder and was expected to miss the remainder of the season. Head coach Mike Singletary elected to not place Clements on injured reserve for the rest of the season in hopes of a possible late season or playoff return. He finished the 2009 season with 35 combined tackles (30 solo), seven passes defensed, and an interception in seven games and six starts.

==== 2010 ====
Head coach Mike Singletary retained Clements as the 49ers' No. 1 starting cornerback to start the season, alongside Shawntae Spencer. On September 26, 2010, Clements collected a season-high nine solo tackles in the 49ers' 31–10 loss at the Kansas City Chiefs. In Week 7, he collected a season-high tying nine combined tackles and a sack in a 23–20 loss at the Carolina Panthers. On December 27, 2010, the San Francisco 49ers fired head coach Mike Singletary after the team fell to a 5–10 record. He finished the season with 82 combined tackles (72 solo), ten pass deflections, three interceptions in 16 games and 16 starts.

==== 2011 ====
On July 28, 2011, the San Francisco 49ers released Clements.

=== Cincinnati Bengals ===
==== 2011 ====
On July 30, 2011, the Cincinnati Bengals signed Clements to a two-year, $10.5 million contract with $6 million guaranteed and a $2 million signing bonus.

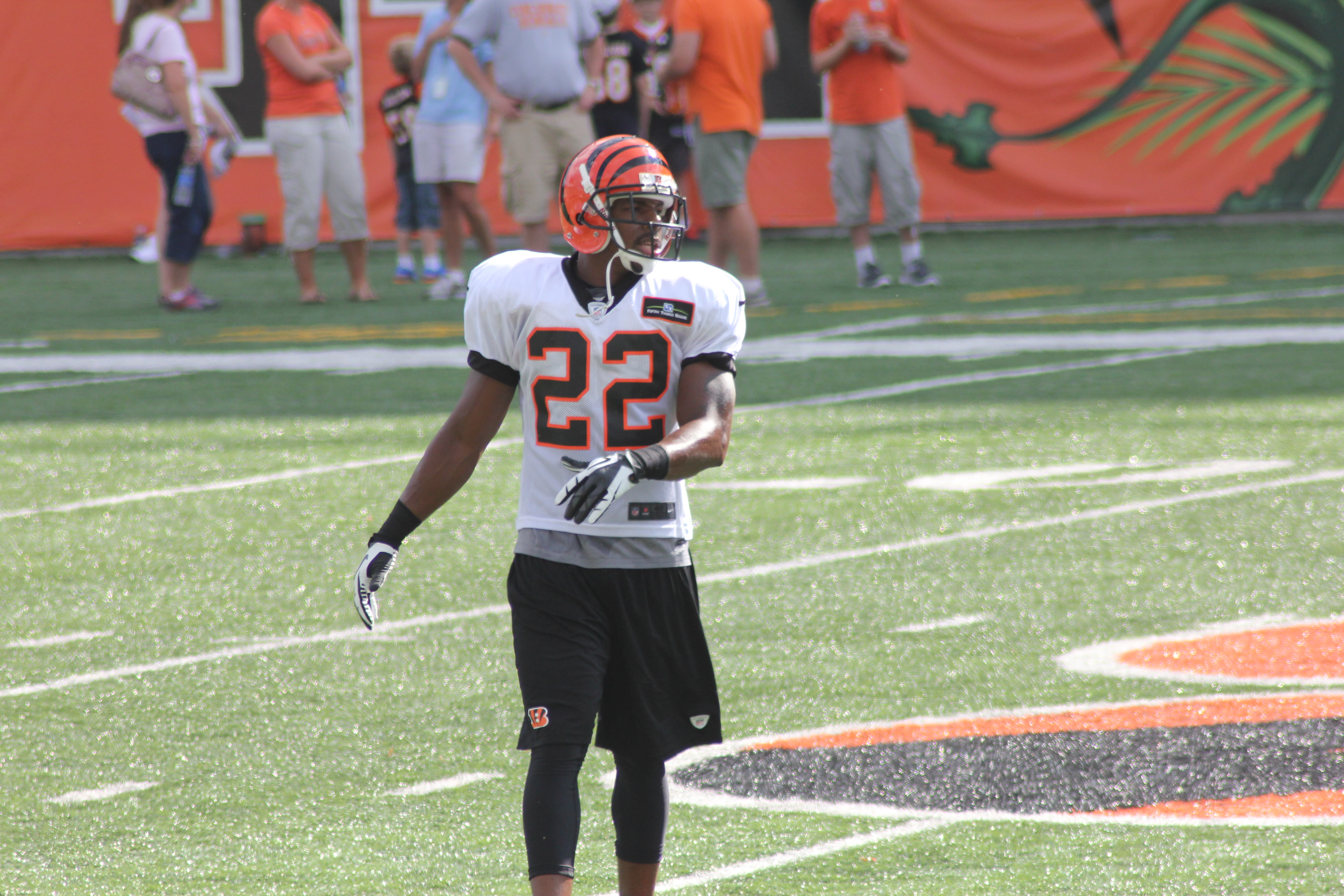
Clements in training camp, 2012

Head coach Marvin Lewis named Clements and Leon Hall the starting cornerbacks to start the 2011 regular season. In Week 9, he collected a season-high seven solo tackles during a 24–10 win at the Tennessee Titans. On December 18, 2011, Clements tied his season-high of seven solo tackles and made a sack in the Bengals' 20–13 victory at the St. Louis Rams. He finished the 2012 season with 55 combined tackles (49 solo), 12 passes defensed, two interceptions, two forced fumbles, and a sack in 15 games and 15 starts.

The Cincinnati Bengals finished third in the AFC North with a 9–7 record, but clinched a wildcard berth as the sixth seed in the NFC. On January 7, 2011, Clements started in his first career playoff game and recorded three solo tackles and a pass deflection in the Bengals' 31–10 loss at the Houston Texans in the AFC Wildcard Game.

==== 2012 ====
Clements entered training camp slated as a starting cornerback, but saw competition from Terence Newman, Jason Allen, Adam "Pacman" Jones, and Dre Kirkpatrick. Clements was one of six cornerbacks on the Bengals' roster that were once heralded first round picks. Head coach Marvin Lewis officially named Clements and Hall the starting cornerbacks to begin 2012.

On September 23, 2012, Clements recorded a season-high ten combined tackles (five solo) during the Bengals' 38–31 win at the Washington Redskins. Clements was inactive for the Bengals' Week 4 victory at the Jacksonville Jaguars due to an injury. Upon returning, Clements began to transition to strong safety after losing his starting cornerback job to Terence Newman during his absence. He started five of the next six games before losing the role back to Chris Crocker. He finished the season with 53 combined tackles (31 solo), five pass deflections, and an interception in 15 games and nine starts.

== NFL career statistics ==
Legend
**Bold**	Career high

Year	Team	GP	Tackles				Fumbles			Interceptions					
Year	Team	GP	Cmb	Solo	Ast	Sck	FF	FR	Yds	Int	Yds	Avg	Lng	TD	PD
2001	BUF	16	67	57	10	**1.0**	3	0	0	3	48	16.0	48	**1**	14
2002	BUF	16	65	52	13	0.0	0	1	0	**6**	**82**	13.6	42	**1**	19
2003	BUF	16	62	51	11	0.0	0	0	0	3	54	18.0	54	**1**	7
2004	BUF	16	79	58	21	0.5	**5**	**2**	**18**	**6**	77	12.8	35	**1**	14
2005	BUF	16	**102**	**81**	21	0.0	3	1	0	2	0	0.0	0	0	13
2006	BUF	16	71	55	16	0.0	2	**2**	0	3	80	**26.6**	58	**1**	**20**
2007	SF	16	92	77	15	**1.0**	3	0	0	4	74	18.5	**62**	0	14
2008	SF	15	63	56	7	0.0	1	0	0	2	13	6.5	13	0	9
2009	SF	7	35	30	5	0.0	0	0	0	1	8	8.0	8	0	7
2010	SF	16	82	72	10	**1.0**	3	0	0	3	46	15.3	39	0	10
2011	CIN	15	55	49	6	**1.0**	2	**2**	0	2	5	2.5	7	0	12
2012	CIN	15	53	31	**22**	0.0	1	0	0	1	21	21.0	21	0	5
Career		180	826	669	157	4.5	23	6	18	36	508	14.1	62	5	141
