= Mike Smith (linebacker) =

American football player and coach (born 1981)

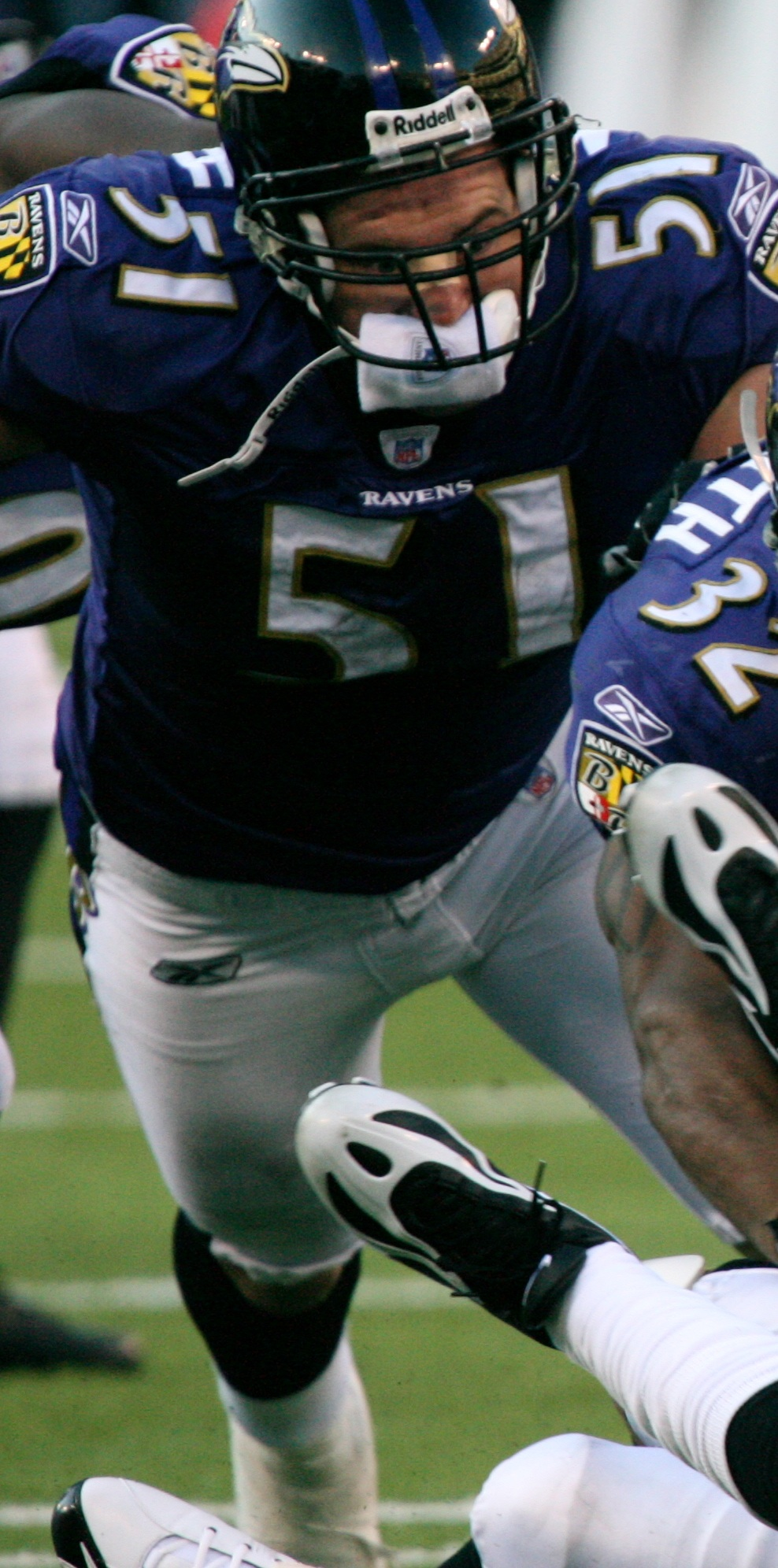
- Smith with the Baltimore Ravens in 2006

New England Patriots
- Title: Outside linebackers coach

Personal information
- Born: September 2, 1981 (age 45); Lubbock, Texas, U.S.
- Listed height: 6 ft 1 in (1.85 m)
- Listed weight: 235 lb (107 kg)

Career information
- Position: Linebacker (No. 51)
- High school: Coronado (Lubbock)
- College: Texas Tech (2000–2004)
- NFL draft: 2005: 7th round, 234th overall pick

Career history

Playing
- Baltimore Ravens (2005–2008)

Coaching
- Hawaii (2009) Linebackers coach; New York Jets (2010–2012); Coaching intern (2010-2011); Outside linebackers coach (2012); Texas Tech (2013-2015); Co-defensive coordinator/outside linebackers coach (2013); Interim defensive coordinator/outside linebackers coach (2014); Co-defensive coordinator/defensive line coach (2015); Kansas City Chiefs (2016–2018); Assistant defensive line coach (2016-2017); Outside linebackers coach (2018); Green Bay Packers (2019–2021) Outside linebackers coach; Minnesota Vikings (2022–2023) Outside linebackers/pass rush specialist; New England Patriots (2025–present) Outside linebackers coach

Awards and highlights
- Second-team All-Big 12 (2004)

Career NFL statistics
- Total tackles: 6
- Stats at Pro Football Reference

Michael Lee Smith (born September 2, 1981) is an American football coach and former linebacker who is the outside linebackers coach for the New England Patriots of the National Football League (NFL). He played in the NFL for the Baltimore Ravens after playing collegiately for the Texas Tech Red Raiders. He was selected by the Ravens in the seventh round of the 2005 NFL draft.

== Early life ==
Smith attended Coronado High School in his hometown of Lubbock, Texas. In his senior year, he recorded 182 tackles and five interceptions.

== College career ==
Smith played college football at the linebacker position for Texas Tech. In 2001, he was named All-Big 12 Honorable Mention and All-Big 12 Freshman Team. During his time there, he started in 45 games and is one of only five other Red Raider players to play in 50 games. He graduated in 2004 with a degree in communication studies.

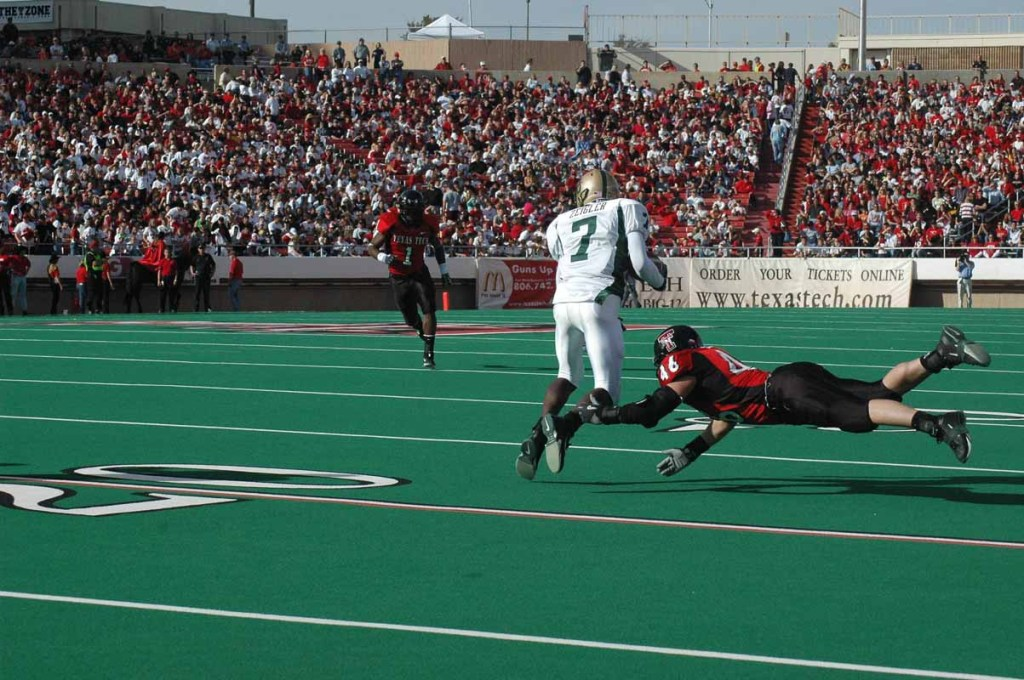
Mike Smith tackling Dominique Zeigler from the Texas Tech Red Raiders vs Baylor Bears in 2004.

== Professional career ==
Pre-draft measurables
Height	Weight	40-yard dash	Three-cone drill	Vertical jump	Broad jump	Bench press
5 ft 11 1/4 in (1.81 m)	204 lb (93 kg)	4.63 s	7.32 s	35.0 in (0.89 m)	9 ft 8 in (2.95 m)	21 reps
All values from Pro Day

Smith was originally signed by the Baltimore Ravens in the seventh round (234th overall) in the 2005 NFL draft. In his rookie year he played in six games recording three tackles. He made his NFL debut on October 31 at the Pittsburgh Steelers. In 2006, he played in eight games again recording three tackles. Smith made his first career start against the Tennessee Titans on November 12, 2006, in place of the injured Ray Lewis. On the first play of the game, the Ravens blitzed. Smith was cut by Titans' center Kevin Mawae and fell onto his left shoulder. He suffered a torn labrum, rotator cuff, biceps tendon and dislocated the shoulder. Over the course of the following year and a half, Smith underwent surgery four times to correct his injuries. He received an injury settlement from the Ravens on July 18, 2008, and was released.

== Coaching career ==
=== Hawaii ===
Smith served as the linebackers coach at the University of Hawaii for one year.

=== New York Jets ===
He joined the Jets prior to the start of the season as an intern. Linebacker Aaron Maybin has credited Smith for rejuvenating his career.

Smith was hired by Washington State head coach Mike Leach on December 13, 2011, to serve as the team's linebackers coach. However, Smith elected to stay with the Jets after being promoted to the outside linebackers coach position. Smith received an offer from West Virginia University where he was said to have the opportunity to coach the linebackers in addition to having co-coordinator responsibilities, which he accepted. After discovering that the job did not entail the responsibilities he had thought would be provided, he returned to the Jets.

=== Texas Tech ===
In late December 2012, Smith was hired to be the co-defensive coordinator and linebackers coach for the Texas Tech Red Raiders. He reunited with former teammate Kliff Kingsbury, who became the team's head coach earlier the same month. Smith was promoted to the full defensive coordinator position following the resignation of Matt Wallerstedt and added defensive line coaching duties for 2015. It was announced that he would not return to Texas Tech following the 2015 season.

=== Kansas City Chiefs ===
Smith was hired by the Kansas City Chiefs as their assistant defensive line coach on April 1, 2016. On January 29, 2018, the Chiefs they had changed Smith's title to outside linebackers coach.

=== Green Bay Packers ===
On January 25, 2019, he was hired by the Green Bay Packers to serve as the outside linebackers coach. On February 18, 2022, Smith stepped away from the Green Bay Packers to pursue other opportunities.

=== Minnesota Vikings ===
Smith was hired by the Minnesota Vikings to serve as the outside linebackers/ pass rush specialist for the 2022 and 2023 seasons.

=== New England Patriots ===
On February 5, 2025, Smith was hired by the New England Patriots to serve as their outside linebackers coach.
