= Tarell Brown =

American football player (born 1985)

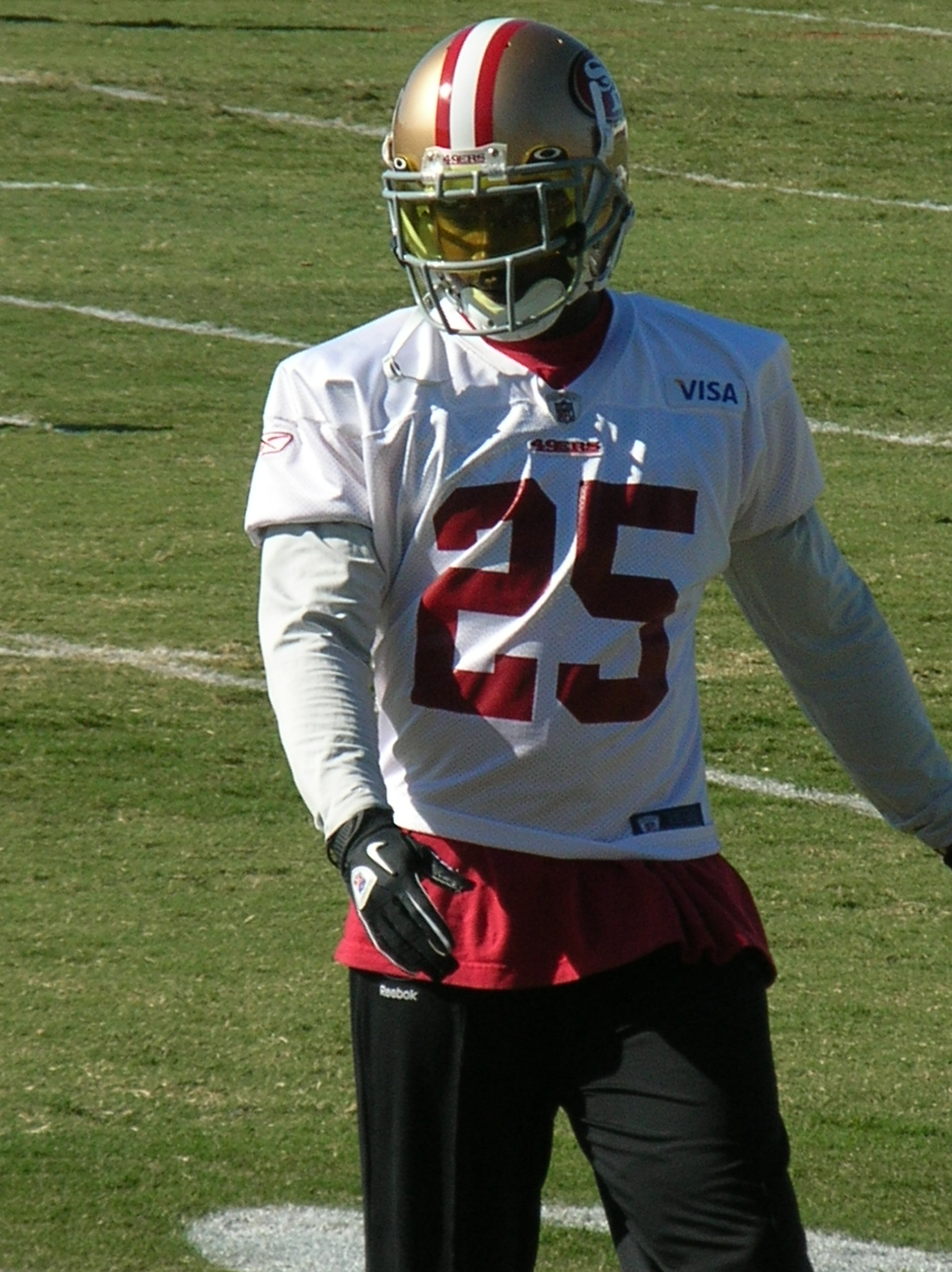
- Brown with the San Francisco 49ers in 2010

No. 23, 25
- Position: Cornerback

Personal information
- Born: January 6, 1985 (age 41); New York City, U.S.
- Listed height: 5 ft 11 in (1.80 m)
- Listed weight: 190 lb (86 kg)

Career information
- High school: North Mesquite (Mesquite, Texas)
- College: Texas
- NFL draft: 2007: 5th round, 147th overall pick

Career history
- San Francisco 49ers (2007–2013); Oakland Raiders (2014); New England Patriots (2015)

Awards and highlights
- BCS national champion (2005); 2005 Rose Bowl champion; 2006 Alamo Bowl champion

Career NFL statistics
- Total tackles: 310
- Fumble recoveries: 2
- Pass deflections: 58
- Interceptions: 11
- Defensive touchdowns: 1
- Stats at Pro Football Reference

Tarell Lameek Brown (born January 6, 1985) is an American former professional football player who was a cornerback in the National Football League (NFL). He played college football for the Texas Longhorns and was selected by the San Francisco 49ers in the fifth round of the 2007 NFL draft.

== Early life ==
Brown played football for North Mesquite High School in Mesquite, Texas where he was named to the USA Today All-USA High School Football Team in 2002. After his high school career was over, he played in the 2003 U.S. Army All-American Bowl.

== College career ==
Brown played defensive back for the Texas Longhorns college football team from 2003 to 2006. He was a member of the National Championship team that played in the 2006 BCS National Championship Game against USC. Brown was injured in the fourth quarter of the game and left with a broken arm.

In his freshman year, he played in 10 games, helping the Longhorns to a 10–3 record, #10 ranking and an appearance in the 2003 Holiday Bowl.

In his sophomore year, Brown co-led the team, along with Cedric Griffin and Michael Huff in interceptions with 2, and helped the team to a #4 ranking and an upset victory over Michigan in the 2005 Rose Bowl.

The next year he helped Texas to win the 2005 Big 12 Championship and the 2005 BCS Championship while recording a career high 54 tackles, 2 TFLs, an interception and forced fumble.

On September 4, 2006, Brown was one of two UT players and one former UT player were arrested in Austin and charged for marijuana possession, a Class B misdemeanor. The two then-current players, Tarell Brown and Tyrell Gatewood, were suspended from the team and did not play on September 9, 2006, game against the 2006 Ohio State Buckeyes football team. Noted for his continual legal problems, Brown was also charged with a Class A misdemeanor weapons violation for being in possession of a firearm without a permit. It was later revealed that Brown and Gatewood had been tasered during the arrest, although the reasons for such treatment were not fully established. That season he helped Texas to win the 2006 Alamo Bowl and finish ranked #13.

During his career at Texas he played in 45 games, recording 61 tackles and 3 interceptions.

== Professional career ==
=== San Francisco 49ers ===
Brown was selected by the San Francisco 49ers in the fifth round (148th overall) of the 2007 NFL draft. During his rookie season, he played in nine games, particularly on special teams and finished the season with two tackles. Brown partially tore his Anterior Cruciate Ligament and tore his Medial collateral ligament completely in Week 17. He was recovered by the start of training camp.

In 2008 Brown got his first start in week 10. In week 16 he intercepted a pass from Rams quarterback Marc Bulger in the final minute of the game, capping off a come-from-behind win in the fourth quarter. It was one of two interceptions for the season.

In 2009, he played in ever game and started four, with 2 more interceptions including one he returned for 51 yards to set up the game winning touchdown against Chicago.

In 2010 he saw less playing time and didn't start all season, but in 2011, he was named the starter at Right Cornerback taking the spot from Shawntae Spencer. He started all sixteen games and had career-highs with 4 interceptions and 14 pass deflections as he helped the 49ers become one of the elite defenses in the NFL. He scored his only career touchdown on a career long 62-yard interception return in the final game against the Washington Redskins.

In the 2012 season, Brown again started every game all the way to Super Bowl XLVII. In the game, he had three combined tackles, a forced fumble, and a fumble recovery as the 49ers fell to the Baltimore Ravens by a score of 34–31. He had a career high 57 combined tackles that year.

During the 2013 offseason, Brown skipped the 49ers' voluntary offseason workout program, which would have paid him an additional $2 million in wages for the 2013 season. Brown fired his agent, Brian Overstreet, saying Overstreet failed to spot an escalation clause in Brown's contract which would have awarded him the pay increase simply for showing up to the offseason workout. Brown started the first ten games of 2013, but then missed the next three following a rib injury during a game against New Orleans. In the last three games his playing time was reduced, but for the three playoff games - including the NFC Championship - he was back to playing full time.

=== Oakland Raiders ===
Brown agreed to a one-year deal worth $3.5 million for the Oakland Raiders in March 2014. He started 14 games with the Raiders, recording 55 tackles and 4 deflected passes, before ending the season on the injured reserve list.

=== New England Patriots ===
In 2015, Brown was signed, just before camp began, by the New England Patriots. He played in 3 of the first 4 games before being placed on the injured reserve on October 17 with a foot injury for the rest of the season. His contract expired after the season was over, he became a free agent and not asked to re-sign.

== NFL career statistics ==
Legend
**Bold**	Career high

=== Regular season ===
Year	Team	Games		Tackles					Interceptions					Fumbles			
Year	Team	GP	GS	Cmb	Solo	Ast	Sck	TFL	Int	Yds	TD	Lng	PD	FF	FR	Yds	TD
2007	SFO	9	0	2	1	1	0.0	0	0	0	0	0	0	0	0	0	0
2008	SFO	15	1	30	26	4	0.0	0	2	1	0	1	3	0	0	0	0
2009	SFO	**16**	4	40	34	6	0.0	0	2	52	0	51	8	0	0	0	0
2010	SFO	15	0	39	36	3	0.0	0	1	**62**	**1**	**62**	5	0	0	0	0
2011	SFO	**16**	**16**	40	36	4	0.0	1	**4**	15	0	11	**15**	0	0	0	0
2012	SFO	**16**	**16**	**57**	**52**	5	0.0	0	2	17	0	12	13	0	0	0	0
2013	SFO	13	10	32	29	3	0.0	0	0	0	0	0	10	0	**2**	**16**	0
2014	OAK	14	14	55	47	**8**	0.0	0	0	0	0	0	4	0	0	0	0
2015	NWE	3	2	15	11	4	0.0	**2**	0	0	0	0	0	0	0	0	0
		117	63	310	272	38	0.0	3	11	147	1	62	58	0	2	16	0

=== Playoffs ===
Year	Team	Games		Tackles					Interceptions					Fumbles			
Year	Team	GP	GS	Cmb	Solo	Ast	Sck	TFL	Int	Yds	TD	Lng	PD	FF	FR	Yds	TD
2011	SFO	2	2	9	7	**2**	0.0	0	**1**	0	0	0	**3**	0	0	0	0
2012	SFO	**3**	**3**	**12**	**11**	1	0.0	0	**1**	**39**	0	**39**	**3**	**1**	**1**	0	0
2013	SFO	**3**	**3**	9	9	0	0.0	0	0	0	0	0	1	0	0	0	0
		8	8	30	27	3	0.0	0	2	39	0	39	7	1	1	0	0
