= Dominique Zeigler =

American football player (born 1984)

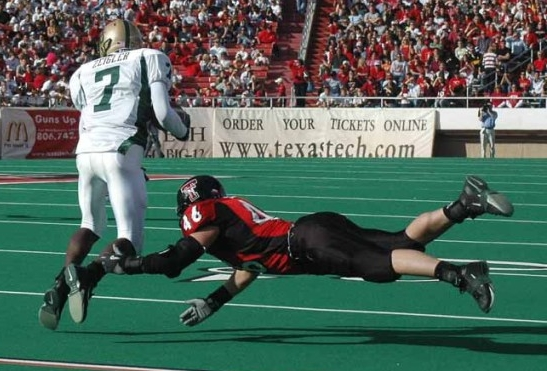
- Dominique pushing for extra yards after the catch against #46 Mike Smith. From Texas Tech Red Raiders vs Baylor Bears in 2004.

No. 17
- Position: Wide receiver

Personal information
- Born: October 11, 1984 (age 42); Kalamazoo, Michigan, U.S.
- Listed height: 6 ft 3 in (1.91 m)
- Listed weight: 185 lb (84 kg)

Career information
- High school: Harker Heights (Harker Heights, Texas)
- College: Baylor
- NFL draft: 2007: undrafted

Career history
- San Francisco 49ers (2007–2010)

Awards and highlights
- 2× Second-team All-Big 12 (2005, 2006)

Career NFL statistics
- Receptions: 14
- Receiving yards: 195
- Stats at Pro Football Reference

Dominique Zeigler (born October 11, 1984) is an American former professional football player who was a wide receiver for the San Francisco 49ers of the National Football League (NFL). He played college football for the Baylor Bears and was signed by the 49ers as an undrafted free agent in 2007. His nickname among players and fans is "Ziggy".

== 2007 Season ==
Zeigler was originally signed by the Niners on May 3, 2007; waived on August 26; then re-signed to the practice squad on September 2, where he spent the entire season.

On January 14, 2008, Zeigler was signed as a free agent to the Niners' roster.

== 2008 Season ==
On August 31, 2008, Zeigler was waived by the Niners and then signed again by the Niners on September 3 and placed on their practice squad. On November 8, he was signed to the active roster and subsequently played in eight regular season games, making five catches for 97 yards and no touchdowns.

== 2009 Season ==
On September 5, 2009, Zeigler was again waived and then signed to the practice squad the next day. On January 6, 2010, Zeigler was signed to the active roster.

== 2010 Season ==
Zeigler played in 11 regular season games, making nine catches for 98 yards and no touchdowns before being placed on season-ending injured reserve on November 30 due to a torn anterior cruciate ligament in his left knee. The injury was sustained the night before during the Niners' 27-6 road win against the Arizona Cardinals.

He was released by the 49ers on September 3, 2011.
