= 2009 San Francisco 49ers season =

American football team season

- Head coach: Mike Singletary
- Offensive coordinator: Jimmy Raye
- Defensive coordinator: Greg Manusky
- Home stadium: Candlestick Park

Results
- Record: 8–8
- Division place: 2nd NFC West
- Playoffs: Did not qualify
- All-Pros: Patrick Willis (1st team); Andy Lee (2nd team)
- Pro Bowlers: RB Frank Gore; TE Vernon Davis; DE Justin Smith; ILB Patrick Willis; P Andy Lee

Uniform
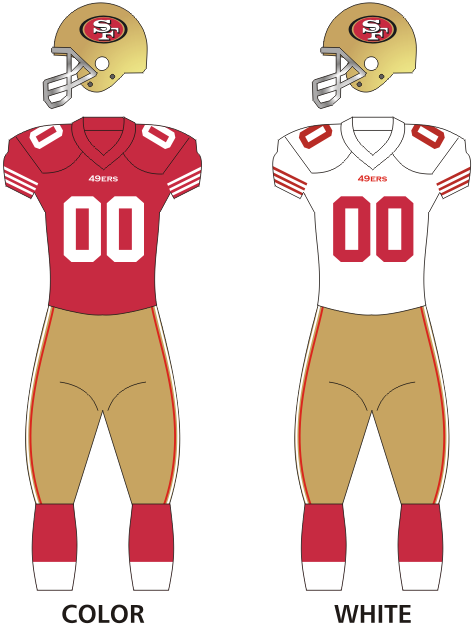

The 2009 San Francisco 49ers season was the franchise's 64th season, 60th in the National Football League (NFL), and the first and only full season with Mike Singletary as head coach after being named interim head coach in 2008. It is the seventh year in which the 49ers have their seventh offensive coordinator. They were looking to improve upon their 7–9 record from 2008 with the 10th overall pick in the 2009 NFL draft.

The 49ers started the 2009 season hot by winning three of the first four games. Their only loss in that span was against the Minnesota Vikings on a last-second, 32-yard touchdown from quarterback Brett Favre to wide receiver Greg Lewis. With that, and a week-5 blowout loss against the Atlanta Falcons, the team got a bad omen for the remainder of the year. The 49ers' defense, led by linebacker Patrick Willis, kept the 49ers in games, while their offense was inconsistent. Most of the blame was due to their weak offensive line, namely, the injury of left tackle Joe Staley in a week 7 game against the Indianapolis Colts.

The 49ers won a week 12 home game over the Jacksonville Jaguars, 20–3. The win helped keep the 49ers' season alive. Going into week 13 against the Seattle Seahawks, the 49ers were heavily favored to win the game; however, critical mistakes in the game cost them the win and gave the team a huge blow of any chances of making the playoffs. The following week on Monday Night Football, the 49ers played the Arizona Cardinals, who were trying to clinch the NFC West. The 49ers' defense came out and exploded on the Cardinals top-ranked offense, causing them to turn over the ball 7 times. This was the first time San Francisco caused 7 or more turnovers in a game since forcing eight against the New Orleans Saints on September 14, 1997. The 49ers won the game 24–9, keeping their very slim playoff hopes alive. The next week they were defeated by the Philadelphia Eagles. The loss officially wiped out the 49ers from playoff contention.

Despite being benched for 5 and a half games, Alex Smith came in and threw for a career-best 2,350 yards, 18 touchdowns, and 12 interceptions. Frank Gore rushed for 1,120 yards and 13 touchdowns. He was awarded his second Pro Bowl appearance. Tight end Vernon Davis turned his career around by leading the team with 965 yards and 13 touchdowns – which tied the single-season record for most touchdowns by a tight end. Rookie wide receiver Michael Crabtree, who held out the first four games of the season, was able to put up solid numbers, with 625 receiving yards, 48 receptions, and 2 touchdowns. On defense, Patrick Willis, for the second time in his first three seasons in the league, led the NFL with 152 tackles and helped the 49ers become one of the best defensive units in the NFL. He was awarded his third straight Pro Bowl appearance.

The 49ers defense would finish the season in the top of the league in multiple categories. They finished fourth in the league in scoring defense, surrendering just 17.6 points per game. They also finished fifth in the league in forced turnovers with 33, tied for first in the league with 15 fumble recoveries and sixth in rushing defense.

== Offseason ==
=== Coaching changes ===
The 49ers released Mike Martz on December 30, 2008. One day following the firing of Martz, the 49ers released quarterbacks coach Ted Tollner and running backs coach Tony Nathan. "To get where we needed to go, I felt those decisions needed to be made at this time", said Mike Singletary. Tony Nathan's replacement came on January 7, 2009, when former 49ers' fullback Tom Rathman agreed to become the new running backs coach.

Before the 49ers found a new quarterbacks coach, they introduced two new coaching positions on January 12, 2009. Mike Singletary's nephew Vantz Singletary became the 49ers' inside linebackers coach, while Al Harris was signed as the 49ers' pass rush specialist coach.

One month after the firing of Martz, Jimmy Raye was finally hired as offensive coordinator, making him the seventh offensive coordinator in seven years for the 49ers. Along with the hiring of Raye, Ted Tollner's replacement Mike Johnson was signed as the 49ers' quarterback coach.

The 49ers' next coaching addition would be Jason Michael as an offensive assistant on March 6, 2009.

==== Offensive coordinator search ====
[Mike Singletary and I] had a shared vision of how you play the game and what we would like to see when the game is played ... His passion for football is kind of contagious. That started the mutual understanding between the two of us.

— Jimmy Raye after being hired as San Francisco's offensive coordinator.

Two days after Mike Singletary was hired as San Francisco's head coach, Singletary fired offensive coordinator Mike Martz. "I am not what he is looking for offensively. I understand that", said Martz in a statement released by the club. With the firing of Martz, the 49ers guaranteed themselves their seventh offensive coordinator in seven years. Possible replacement candidates included Colts wide receivers coach Clyde Christensen, former Rams head coach Scott Linehan, Browns offensive coordinator Rob Chudzinski. After a second interview with the 49ers, Linehan was offered the position; however, he declined the position stating that it was not right for his family. Soon after, Linehan accepted the offensive coordinator position for the Detroit Lions. Following, the 49ers interviews Broncos offensive coordinator Rick Dennison, former Boston College coach Jeff Jagodzinski, and Ravens quarterbacks coach Hue Jackson. On the same day as the interview with Jackson, the 49ers flew in former Atlanta Falcons head coach Dan Reeves for an interview for the position. Following the Reeves interview, the 49ers interviewed Hue Jackson a second time.

One day after Jackson was interviewed, former New York Jets' running back coach Jimmy Raye II was interviewed, making him the eighth offensive coordinator candidate to be interviewed by the 49ers. After interviewing with the 49ers, Raye was named the new offensive coordinator for the San Francisco 49ers; coincidentally, Raye's first NFL job was the wide receivers coach for the 49ers under Ken Meyer in 1977. Raye stated that he and Mike Singletary shared a belief on how football should be played, that being a ground-based, physical football team. Raye has had successful years as a run-based offensive coordinator, namely with the 1984 Los Angeles Rams, when Eric Dickerson rushed for a league-record 2,105 yards. However, his recent success has been questionable. While being the Oakland Raiders' offensive coordinator from 2004 to 2005, the Raiders were 32nd and 29th in rushing offense, respectively. Nonetheless, while Raye was running backs coach for the New York Jets over the past two years, Jets' running back Thomas Jones has finished each season with over 1,000 yards rushing. In the 2008 season, Jones finished the season with the 5th most rushing yards, behind only Adrian Peterson, Michael Turner, DeAngelo Williams, and Clinton Portis.

=== Uniform change ===
In 1996 the 49ers changed their uniform colors to a darker cardinal red, with the most recent change being updating their pants back to gold in 1998. Eleven years later, the 49ers decided to once again modify their uniform. The uniform change rumors were confirmed by Andy Dolich at the 49ers' State of the Franchise. When asked when they were going to change their uniforms "back to normal", Dolich replied, stating, "Stay tuned. Don't be surprised if you see championship colors back". The uniforms were revealed on April 25, 2009, during the first day of the draft. 49ers players Patrick Willis, Josh Morgan, Dashon Goldson, Joe Staley, and Moran Norris displayed the new jerseys and pants at the 49ers draft party. The new jerseys are very similar to the classic design, with minor changes to the sleeve stripes, the moving of secondary numerals to the top of the shoulders, and the inclusion of a "49ers" ligature below the neck. The shade of red is also arguably slightly darker than the scarlet of classic jerseys, but significantly lighter than the cardinal red used in the 1996–2008 designs.

=== Roster changes ===
==== Additions ====
The following are players signed by the 49ers in the 2009 off-season:

Date signed	Position	Player	2008 Team	Contract
01-22	CB	Jimmy Williams	Did not play	Released
01-23	WR	Micheal Spurlock	Tampa Bay Buccaneers	TBA
01-29	WR	Maurice Price	New England Patriots	TBA
02-28	WR	Brandon Jones	Tennessee Titans	5 yrs / $16.5 mil
03-02	FB	Moran Norris	Detroit Lions	3 yrs / $5 mil
03-04	QB	Damon Huard	Kansas City Chiefs	TBA
03-10	DE	Demetric Evans	Washington Redskins	2 yrs / $3.8 mil
03-16	S	Lewis Baker	Did not play	Released
03-16	LB	Mark Washington	Did not play	TBA
03-27	OT	Marvel Smith	Pittsburgh Steelers	TBA
04-30	OT	Alex Boone	Ohio State Buckeyes†	TBA
04-30	LB	Diyral Biggs	Bowling Green Falcons†	TBA
04-30	WR	Dobson Collins	Gardner–Webb Runnin' Bulldogs†	TBA
04-30	DE	Pannel Egboh	Stanford Cardinal†	TBA
04-30	QB	Kirby Freeman	Baylor Bears†	Released
04-30	G	Kyle Howard	Wyoming Cowboys†	TBA
04-30	G	Matthew Huners	South Florida Bulls†	Released
04-30	CB	Terrail Lambert	Notre Dame Fighting Irish†	TBA
04-30	DE	Khalif Mitchell	East Carolina Pirates†	TBA
04-30	RB	Kory Sheets	Purdue Boilermakers†	Released
04-30	CB	Carlos Thomas	South Carolina Gamecocks†	TBA
04-30	CB	Jahi Word-Daniels	Georgia Tech Yellow Jackets†	TBA
04-30	LB	Marques Harris	San Diego Chargers	1yr
05-01	K	Alex Romero	New Orleans VooDoo‡	TBA
05-21	CB	Dré Bly	Denver Broncos	1 yr
07-07	FB	Brit Miller	Illinois Fighting Illini†	TBA
07-30	DT	Babatunde Oshinowo	Philadelphia Eagles	Released
07-31	G/C	Matt Spanos	Miami Dolphins	1 yr
08-07	WR	Chris Francies	New Orleans Saints	TBA
08-16	FB	Bill Rentmeester	Wisconsin Badgers†	–
08-19	CB	Eric Green	Arizona Cardinals	1 yr

† College football team
‡ Arena Football League team

==== Departures ====
The following are players who were released by the 49ers in the 2009 off-season:

Date Released	Position	Player	Contract left	2009 Team
02-10	LB	Tully Banta-Cain	1yr / $1.275 mil	New England Patriots
02-10	S	Keith Lewis	1yr / $0.85 mil	Arizona Cardinals
03-27	OT	Jonas Jennings	3yrs	–
05-13	QB	Kirby Freeman	–	–
05-18	S	Jimmy Williams	–	–
07-24	S	Lewis Baker	–	–
07-31	C/G	Matthew Huners	–	–
08-07	DL	Babatunde Oshinowo	–	–
08-16	RB	Thomas Clayton	–	–

==== Free agents ====
The following are players whose contracts expired at the end of the 2008 season:

Position	Player	Free agency tag*	2009 Team	Date signed	Contract
TE	Billy Bajema	UFA	St. Louis Rams	March 30, 2009	TBA
OT	Damane Duckett	UFA	New England Patriots	March 24, 2009	TBA
DE	Ronald Fields	UFA	Denver Broncos	March 3, 2009	2yrs / $5 mil
RB	DeShaun Foster	UFA	TBA		
LB	Roderick Green	UFA	TBA		
WR	Bryant Johnson	UFA	Detroit Lions	February 28, 2009	3yrs / $9 mil
QB	Jamie Martin	UFA	TBA		
QB	JT O'Sullivan	UFA	Cincinnati Bengals	March 6, 2009	2yrs
RS	Allen Rossum	UFA	San Francisco 49ers	March 10, 2009	TBA
TE	Sean Ryan	UFA	Kansas City Chiefs	April 21, 2009	TBA
LB	Takeo Spikes	UFA	San Francisco 49ers	March 4, 2009	2 yrs
CB	Donald Strickland	UFA	New York Jets	March 25, 2009	3yrs
FB	Zak Keasey	ERFA	TBA		

*RFA: Restricted free agent, UFA: Unrestricted free agent, ERFA: Exclusive-rights free agent

=== 2009 NFL draft ===
After finishing the 2008 season with a 7–9 record, the 49ers held the 10th overall pick in the 2009 NFL draft.

San Francisco 49ers' 2009 NFL Draft selections
Draft order			Player name	Position	Height	Weight	College	Contract	Notes
Round	Choice	Overall	Player name	Position	Height	Weight	College	Contract	Notes
1	10	10	Michael Crabtree	WR	6 ft 2 in	214 lb	Texas Tech	6 yrs	
2	11	43	Traded						Traded to the Carolina Panthers
3	10	74	Glen Coffee	RB	6 ft 0 in	209 lb	Alabama	4 yrs	
4	11	111	Traded						Traded to the Carolina Panthers
5	10	146	Scott McKillop	ILB	6 ft 1 in	244 lb	Pitt	4 yrs	
5	35	171	Nate Davis	QB	6 ft 1 in	226 lb	Ball State	4 yrs	Compensatory Pick
6	11	184	Bear Pascoe	TE	6 ft 5 in	261 lb	Fresno State	4 yrs	
7	10	219	Curtis Taylor	S	6 ft 3 in	204 lb	LSU	4 yrs / $1.8 mil	
7	35	244	Ricky Jean-Francois	DT	6 ft 3 in	281 lb	LSU	4 yrs	Compensatory Pick

Surprisingly, the Oakland Raiders opted to choose WR Darrius Heyward-Bey at the 7th pick instead of WR Michael Crabtree, who was considered the top wide receiver in the draft. Because of this, the 49ers were able to pick Crabtree at the 10th selection. "Once we got to 10 and Crabtree was there, it was over", said general manager Scot McCloughan, "... this is great, this is outstanding." Additionally, the 49ers traded their 2009 2nd- and 4th-round picks to the Carolina Panthers for their 2010 1st-round pick.

== Staff ==
2009 San Francisco 49ers staff
Front office {{{front_office}}} Head coaches: Head coach – Mike Singletary; Special assistant to the head coach – Bill Nayes; Special assistant to the head coach/defensive backs/secondary – Johnnie Lynn; Offensive coaches: Offensive coordinator – Jimmy Raye; Quarterbacks – Mike Johnson; Running backs – Tom Rathman; Senior assistant/wide receivers – Jerry Sullivan; Tight ends – Pete Hoener; Offensive line – Chris Foerster; Offensive assistant – Jason Michael; Offensive quality control – Shane Day	Defensive coaches: Defensive coordinator – Greg Manusky; Defensive line – Jim Tomsula; Outside linebackers – Jason Tarver; Inside linebackers – Vantz Singletary; Defensive backs – Vance Joseph; Pass rush specialist – Al Harris; Special teams coaches: Special teams coordinator – Al Everest; Assistant special teams – Dave Fipp; Strength and conditioning: Strength and conditioning – Duane Carlisle; Assistant strength and conditioning – Mark Uyeyama; Head athletic trainer – Jeff Ferguson

== Roster ==
2009 San Francisco 49ers roster
Quarterbacks (QB): 7 Nate Davis; 13 Shaun Hill; 11 Alex Smith; Running backs (RB): 29 Glen Coffee; 21 Frank Gore; 47 Brit Miller FB; 44 Moran Norris FB; 24 Michael Robinson; Wide receivers (WR): 83 Arnaz Battle; 88 Isaac Bruce; 15 Michael Crabtree; 89 Jason Hill; 81 Brandon Jones; 84 Josh Morgan; Tight ends (TE): 85 Vernon Davis; 46 Delanie Walker	Offensive linemen (OL): 64 David Baas G; 66 Eric Heitmann C; 61 Chris Patrick T; 62 Chilo Rachal G; 65 Barry Sims T; 68 Adam Snyder T; 74 Joe Staley T; 59 Cody Wallace C; 69 Tony Wragge C/G; Defensive linemen (DL): 93 Demetric Evans DE; 92 Aubrayo Franklin NT; 95 Ricky Jean Francois NT; 91 Ray McDonald DE; 94 Justin Smith DE; 90 Isaac Sopoaga DE; 78 Derek Walker DE	Linebackers (LB): 50 Diyral Briggs OLB; 55 Ahmad Brooks OLB; 98 Parys Haralson OLB; 99 Manny Lawson OLB; 56 Scott McKillop ILB; 51 Takeo Spikes ILB; 57 Matt Wilhelm ILB; 52 Patrick Willis ILB; Defensive backs (DB): 31 Dré Bly CB; 25 Tarell Brown CB; 22 Nate Clements CB; 38 Dashon Goldson FS; 23 Marcus Hudson CB; 32 Michael Lewis SS; 26 Mark Roman FS; 30 Reggie Smith SS; 36 Shawntae Spencer CB; Special teams (ST): 9 Shane Andrus K; 86 Brian Jennings LS; 4 Andy Lee P; 6 Joe Nedney K	Practice squad: 71 Kirk Barton T; 75 Alex Boone T; 58 Martail Burnett LB; 49 Joe Jon Finley TE; 35 Keon Lattimore RB; 60 Khalif Mitchell G; 18 Rodney Wright WR; 17 Dominique Zeigler WR; Reserve: 96 Kentwan Balmer DE (IR); 33 Thomas Clayton RB (IR); 27 Walt Harris CB (IR); 77 Tony Pashos T (IR); 2 Ricky Schmitt K (IR); 28 Curtis Taylor S (IR); 53 Jeff Ulbrich LB (IR); Rookies in italics 53 active, 7 reserve, 8 practice squad

== Schedule ==
=== Preseason ===
Week	Date	Opponent	Result	Record	Venue	Recap
1	August 14	Denver Broncos	**W** 17–16	1–0	Candlestick Park	Recap
2	August 22	Oakland Raiders	**W** 21–20	2–0	Candlestick Park	Recap
3	August 29	at Dallas Cowboys	**W** 20–13	3–0	Cowboys Stadium	Recap
4	September 4	at San Diego Chargers	**L** 7–26	3–1	Qualcomm Stadium	Recap

=== Regular season ===
Week	Date	Opponent	Result	Record	Venue	Recap
1	September 13	at **Arizona Cardinals**	**W** 20–16	1–0	University of Phoenix Stadium	Recap
2	September 20	**Seattle Seahawks**	**W** 23–10	2–0	Candlestick Park	Recap
3	September 27	at Minnesota Vikings	**L** 24–27	2–1	Hubert H. Humphrey Metrodome	Recap
4	October 4	**St. Louis Rams**	**W** 35–0	3–1	Candlestick Park	Recap
5	October 11	Atlanta Falcons	**L** 10–45	3–2	Candlestick Park	Recap
6	Bye					
7	October 25	at Houston Texans	**L** 21–24	3–3	Reliant Stadium	Recap
8	November 1	at Indianapolis Colts	**L** 14–18	3–4	Lucas Oil Stadium	Recap
9	November 8	Tennessee Titans	**L** 27–34	3–5	Candlestick Park	Recap
10	November 12	Chicago Bears	**W** 10–6	4–5	Candlestick Park	Recap
11	November 22	at Green Bay Packers	**L** 24–30	4–6	Lambeau Field	Recap
12	November 29	Jacksonville Jaguars	**W** 20–3	5–6	Candlestick Park	Recap
13	December 6	at **Seattle Seahawks**	**L** 17–20	5–7	Qwest Field	Recap
14	December 14	**Arizona Cardinals**	**W** 24–9	6–7	Candlestick Park	Recap
15	December 20	at Philadelphia Eagles	**L** 13–27	6–8	Lincoln Financial Field	Recap
16	December 27	Detroit Lions	**W** 20–6	7–8	Candlestick Park	Recap
17	January 3	at **St. Louis Rams**	**W** 28–6	8–8	Edward Jones Dome	Recap
Note: Intra-division opponents are in **bold** text.

== Regular season summaries ==
=== Week 1: at Arizona Cardinals ===
Week 1: San Francisco 49ers at Arizona Cardinals – Game summary

Quarter	1	2	3	4	Total
49ers	6	7	0	7	20
Cardinals	0	6	7	3	16

at University of Phoenix Stadium, Glendale, Arizona

- Date: September 13
- Game time: 4:15 p.m. EDT/1:15 pm PDT
- Game weather: None (dome closed)
- Game attendance: 61,981
- Referee: Don Carey
- TV announcers (Fox): Sam Rosen, Tim Ryan, & Nischelle Turner

Game information
First quarter
- SF- Joe Nedney 37 yard field goal
- SF- Joe Nedney 50 yard field goal

Second quarter

- AZ- Neil Rackers 44 yard field goal
- SF- Frank Gore 6 yard rush (Joe Nedney kick)
- AZ- Neil Rackers 29 yard field goal

Third quarter

- AZ- Larry Fitzgerald 5 yard pass from Kurt Warner (Neil Rackers kick)

Fourth quarter

- AZ- Neil Rackers 43 yard field goal
- SF- Frank Gore 3 yard pass from Shaun Hill (Joe Nedney kick)

The 49ers flew to Arizona for a week 1 opener against the team that had swept them the previous season. 49ers quarterback Shaun Hill made his season-opening debut, hoping to redeem himself for letting a close game slip through his fingers the previous year. The first half was largely a defensive struggle. With 5:26 remaining in the first half Frank Gore, the 49ers feature back and offensive focal point the last three seasons, had been held to negative one yard rushing on six carries. Arizona's offense, known in 2008 for their great passing attack, was forced to punt after going 3 and out on three separate occasions, was held to only 3 first downs, and turned the ball over once on an interception by Patrick Willis at this point in the game. After trading field goals, the 49ers were up 6–3 when Frank Gore pounded his way through for a 6-yard score. Cardinals kicker Neil Rackers would kick a 45-yard field goal to close out the first half to make the score 13–6.

In the third quarter, Kurt Warner led the Cardinals on a long drive capped off with a quick touchdown pass to Larry Fitzgerald, a score that would tie the game at 13–13. Despite the small momentum the 49ers had gained by the end of the first half, in the third quarter the 49ers were held to all of 4 yards total Offense. All of the momentum was going Arizona's way after forcing the 49ers to zero first downs and three punts in as many drives. Not long thereafter, the Cardinals took the lead with a Rackers field goal to get the score to 16–13. In 4th quarter, Shaun Hill lifted his demons by responding on the following drive leading the 49ers offense on a long drive lasting 15 plays that was capped off with a 4-yard touchdown pass to Frank Gore. More tension was yet to come as the 49ers defense stopped the Cardinals hurry-up offense on two consecutive drives, one ending on a failed 4th and 5 from the 49ers 33 yard line with 1:51 left in the game. After forcing the Cardinals to burn up their final two time-outs with consecutive runs the 49ers were forced to punt giving Arizona one last chance with only 43 seconds left to play from their own 12. Defensive end Justin Smith would make the game winning sack. With the win, led primarily by the 49ers outstanding defensive effort, the 49ers started their season 1–0.

Wide receiver Isaac Bruce (4 receptions, 74 yards) would join Jerry Rice as the only receivers to surpass 15,000 career receiving yards.

=== Week 2: vs. Seattle Seahawks ===
Week 2: Seattle Seahawks at San Francisco 49ers – Game summary

Quarter	1	2	3	4	Total
Seahawks	0	10	0	0	10
49ers	10	3	7	3	23

at Candlestick Park, San Francisco

- Date: September 20
- Game time: 4:05 p.m. EDT/1:05 pm PDT
- Game weather: 78 °F (26 °C) (Sunny)
- Game attendance: 69,732
- Referee: Bill Leavy
- TV announcers (Fox): Thom Brennaman & Brian Billick

Coming off their upset road win over the Cardinals, the 49ers would play their Week 2 home opener against another NFC West foe, the Seattle Seahawks. San Francisco would get off to a fast start in the first quarter as kicker Joe Nedney got a 37-yard field goal, followed by running back Frank Gore getting a 79-yard touchdown run. The Seahawks would answer in the second quarter as kicker Olindo Mare made a 36-yard field goal. The 49ers would reply with Nedney making a 42-yard field goal, while Seattle closed out the half with quarterback Seneca Wallace completing a 1-yard touchdown pass to running back Julius Jones.

On the first play of the 3rd quarter, the Niners struck back as Gore would break an 80-yard touchdown run. Afterwards, Nedney closed the game out in the fourth quarter as he nailed a 39-yard field goal.

With the win, the 49ers improved to 2–0.

Gore (16 carries, 207 yards, 2 TDs) would join Barry Sanders and Maurice Jones-Drew as the only running backs in history to have two 75+ yard runs in one game.

=== Week 3: at Minnesota Vikings ===
Week 3: San Francisco 49ers at Minnesota Vikings – Game summary

Quarter	1	2	3	4	Total
49ers	0	14	3	7	24
Vikings	7	6	7	7	27

at Hubert H. Humphrey Metrodome, Minneapolis

- Date: September 27
- Game time: 1:00 p.m. EDT/10:00 am PDT
- Game weather: None (Domed Stadium)
- Game attendance: 63,398
- Referee: Jerome Boger
- TV announcers (Fox): Sam Rosen, Tim Ryan and Nischelle Turner

Coming off an impressive divisional home win over the Seahawks, the 49ers flew to the Hubert H. Humphrey Metrodome for a Week 3 duel with the Minnesota Vikings. San Francisco would trail early as Vikings quarterback Brett Favre completed a 30-yard touchdown pass to wide receiver Sidney Rice. Minnesota would increase their lead in the second quarter with kicker Ryan Longwell's 40-yard field goal. The 49ers would answer with quarterback Shaun Hill's 5-yard touchdown pass to tight end Vernon Davis. The Vikings struck back with Longwell's 52-yard field goal, yet the Niners would take the lead prior to halftime as cornerback Nate Clements returned a blocked field goal 59 yards for a touchdown.

San Francisco would increase their lead in the third quarter with kicker Joe Nedney's 37-yard field goal, but Minnesota replied with wide receiver Percy Harvin returning a kickoff 101 yards for a touchdown. In the fourth quarter, the Niners got the lead again Hill hooking up with Davis again on a 20-yard touchdown pass. However, the Vikings would snatch victory from the jaws of defeat as Favre completed a 32-yard touchdown pass to wide receiver Greg Lewis with 2 seconds left in the game.

With the loss, the 49ers fell to 2–1.

=== Week 4: vs. St. Louis Rams ===
Week 4: St. Louis Rams at San Francisco 49ers – Game summary

Quarter	1	2	3	4	Total
Rams	0	0	0	0	0
49ers	0	7	14	14	35

at Candlestick Park, San Francisco

- Date: October 4
- Game time: 4:15 p.m. EDT/1:15 pm PDT
- Game weather: 62 °F (17 °C) (Sunny)
- Game attendance: 69,732
- Referee: Tony Corrente
- TV announcers (Fox): Ron Pitts, John Lynch, and Nischelle Turner

The 49ers stayed home and looked to continue their undefeated streak against their divisional opponents with the St. Louis Rams coming to San Francisco. In the first half both teams would sputter offensively. Finally, the 49ers would receive some encouragement from special teams as rookie linebacker Scott McKillop recovered a muffed punt for a touchdown. After halftime, the 49ers were finally able to get some headway offensively as Shaun Hill completed an 18-yard touchdown to Vernon Davis. Not long after that, the 49ers defense cemented the victory with an interception returned for a touchdown by third-year linebacker Patrick Willis, and a fumble recovery for a touchdown by Ray McDonald. Shaun Hill put the final touches on as he completed a 28-yard touchdown pass to Josh Morgan to complete the shutout of 35–0.

With the win, the 49ers improved to 3–1 for the first time since 2002.

Patrick Willis had an excellent day, getting 2.5 sacks and an interception returned for a touchdown.

This also was the 49ers' first shutout win since 2002.

=== Week 5: vs. Atlanta Falcons ===
Week 5: Atlanta Falcons at San Francisco 49ers – Game summary

Quarter	1	2	3	4	Total
Falcons	14	21	3	7	45
49ers	7	3	0	0	10

at Candlestick Park, San Francisco

- Date: October 11
- Game time: 4:05 p.m. EDT/1:05 pm PDT
- Game weather: 62 °F (17 °C) (Overcast)
- Game attendance: 69,732
- Referee: Pete Morelli
- TV announcers (Fox): Kenny Albert, Daryl Johnston, & Tony Siragusa

Coming off their shutout home win over the Rams, the 49ers stayed at home for a Week 5 duel with the Atlanta Falcons. The Niners would trail early in the first quarter as Falcons running back Michael Turner got a 7-yard touchdown run, followed by quarterback Matt Ryan's 31-yard touchdown pass to wide receiver Roddy White. San Francisco would answer with a 2-yard touchdown run from running back Glen Coffee. After starting the second quarter with a 39-yard field goal from kicker Joe Nedney, Atlanta took over with Ryan hooking up with White again on a 90-yard touchdown pass and Turner's 3-yard & 1-yard touchdown runs. The Falcons would then close out the game with kicker Jason Elam's 40-yard field goal in the third quarter and Ryan's 1-yard touchdown run in the fourth.

With the loss, the 49ers entered their bye week at 3–2.

=== Week 7: at Houston Texans ===
Week 7: San Francisco 49ers at Houston Texans – Game summary

Quarter	1	2	3	4	Total
49ers	0	0	7	14	21
Texans	7	14	0	3	24

at Reliant Stadium, Houston

- Date: October 25
- Game time: 1:00 p.m. EDT/10:00 am PDT
- Game weather: 74 °F (23 °C) (Sunny)
- Game attendance: 70,820
- Referee: Mike Carey
- TV announcers (Fox): Chris Myers, Brian Billick & Nischelle Turner

Coming off their bye week, the 49ers flew to Reliant Stadium for a Week 7 interconference showdown with the Houston Texans. San Francisco would find itself trailing early in the first quarter as Texans running back Steve Slaton got a 1-yard touchdown. Houston would add onto their lead in the second quarter with quarterback Matt Schaub hooking up with Slaton on a 9-yard touchdown pass and finding tight end Owen Daniels on a 42-yard touchdown pass.

For the second half, starting quarterback Shaun Hill (6/11 for 45 yards) was benched due to poor performance and replaced with quarterback Alex Smith. It began to pay off in the third quarter as Smith completed a 29-yard touchdown pass to tight end Vernon Davis. In the fourth quarter, Smith and Davis would hook up with each other again on a 14-yard touchdown pass. However, the Texans answered with a 50-yard field goal from kicker Kris Brown. The Niners tried to rally as Smith found Davis again on a 23-yard touchdown pass, but that would be as close to a comeback that San Francisco would get as Houston's defense stiffened for the win.

With the loss, the 49ers fell to 3–3.

Wide receiver Michael Crabtree, in his NFL debut, would have 5 receptions for 56 yards.

=== Week 8: at Indianapolis Colts ===
Week 8: San Francisco 49ers at Indianapolis Colts – Game summary

Quarter	1	2	3	4	Total
49ers	7	7	0	0	14
Colts	3	6	3	6	18

at Lucas Oil Stadium, Indianapolis

- Date: November 1
- Game time: 1:00 p.m. EST/10:00 am PST
- Game weather: 49 °F (9 °C) (Sunny)
- Game attendance: 66,229
- Referee: Ed Hochuli
- TV announcers (Fox): Sam Rosen, Tim Ryan & Laura Okmin

Trying to snap their two-game losing streak, the 49ers flew to Lucas Oil Stadium for a Week 8 interconference duel with the Indianapolis Colts. This game would be quarterback Alex Smith's first start since November 12, 2007.

In the first quarter, San Francisco struck first as running back Frank Gore got a 64-yard touchdown run. The Colts would answer with a 38-yard field goal from kicker Matt Stover. Indianapolis would begin the second quarter with Stover's 33-yard field goal, yet the Niners came right back with Smith's 8-yard touchdown pass to tight end Vernon Davis. Afterwards, the Colts would close out the half with Stover nailing a 31-yard field goal.

Indianapolis would take the lead in the third quarter as Stover nailed a 40-yard field goal, followed by running back Joseph Addai's 22-yard touchdown pass to wide receiver Reggie Wayne to begin the fourth quarter (with a failed 2-point conversion). San Francisco tried to rally, but the Colts' defense would shut down any possible comeback attempt.

With the loss, the 49ers fell to 3–4.

=== Week 9: vs. Tennessee Titans ===
Week 9: Tennessee Titans at San Francisco 49ers – Game summary

Quarter	1	2	3	4	Total
Titans	3	7	7	17	34
49ers	3	14	0	10	27

at Candlestick Park, San Francisco

- Date: November 8
- Game time: 4:15 p.m. EST/1:15 pm PST
- Game weather: 64 °F (18 °C) (Sunny)
- Game attendance: 69,732
- Referee: Carl Cheffers
- TV announcers (CBS): Ian Eagle & Rich Gannon

Trying to snap a three-game losing streak, the 49ers went home for a Week 9 interconference duel with the Tennessee Titans. In the first quarter, San Francisco struck first as kicker Joe Nedney made a 40-yard field goal. The Titans would respond with a 21-yard field goal from kicker Rob Bironas. Tennessee would take the lead in the second quarter as quarterback Vince Young got a 7-yard touchdown run, yet the 49ers regained the lead with running back Frank Gore's 3-yard touchdown run and quarterback Alex Smith's 12-yard touchdown pass to wide receiver Jason Hill.

The Titans would tie the game in the third quarter with a 1-yard touchdown run from running back Chris Johnson. San Francisco would begin the fourth quarter with Nedney booting a 25-yard field goal, but Tennessee would take the lead with Johnson's 2-yard touchdown run, kicker Rob Bironas' 28-yard field goal, and cornerback Cortland Finnegan returning an interception 39 yards for a touchdown. The Niners tried to rally as Smith hooked up with Hill again on a 3-yard touchdown pass, but the Titans' defense would prevent further progress.

With their fourth-straight loss, the 49ers fell to 3–5.

=== Week 10: vs. Chicago Bears ===
Week 10: Chicago Bears at San Francisco 49ers – Game summary

Quarter	1	2	3	4	Total
Bears	0	3	3	0	6
49ers	0	7	0	3	10

at Candlestick Park, San Francisco

- Date: November 12
- Game time: 8:20 p.m. EST/5:20 pm PST
- Game weather: 54 °F (12 °C) (Clear)
- Game attendance: 69,732
- Referee: Ron Winter
- TV announcers (NFLN): Bob Papa & Matt Millen

Hoping to snap a four-game losing streak, the 49ers stayed at home for a Week 10 Thursday night duel with the Chicago Bears, as head coach Mike Singletary prepared to face his former team.

After a scoreless first quarter, San Francisco would strike in the second quarter with a 14-yard touchdown run from running back Frank Gore. The Bears would close out the half with kicker Robbie Gould getting a 50-yard field goal. Chicago would creep closer in the third quarter as Gould nailed a 38-yard field goal. Afterwards, the Niners would add onto their lead as kicker Joe Nedney booted a 21-yard field goal. The Bears would get a comeback drive going as they got inside San Francisco's redzone, yet safety Michael Lewis got the game-ending interception, which preserved the four-point lead.

With their four-game losing streak snapped, the 49ers improved to 4–5.

=== Week 11: at Green Bay Packers ===
Week 11: San Francisco 49ers at Green Bay Packers – Game summary

Quarter	1	2	3	4	Total
49ers	3	0	7	14	24
Packers	6	17	0	7	30

at Lambeau Field, Green Bay, Wisconsin

- Date: November 22
- Game time: 1:00 p.m. EST/10:00 am PST
- Game weather: 53 °F (12 °C) (Partly Sunny)
- Game attendance: 70,445
- Referee: Scott Green
- TV announcers (Fox): Thom Brennaman, Brian Billick & Chris Myers

With the loss, the 49ers fell to 4–6.

=== Week 12: vs. Jacksonville Jaguars ===
Week 12: Jacksonville Jaguars at San Francisco 49ers – Game summary

Quarter	1	2	3	4	Total
Jaguars	0	3	0	0	3
49ers	3	14	3	0	20

at Candlestick Park, San Francisco

- Date: November 29
- Game time: 4:05 p.m. EST/1:05 pm PST
- Game weather: 68 °F (20 °C) (Sunny)
- Game attendance: 69,732
- Referee: John Parry
- TV announcers (CBS): Kevin Harlan & Solomon Wilcots

With the win, the 49ers improved to 5–6 and within two games of the Cardinals for the division lead. This marked the 49ers first victory over the Jaguars in franchise history.

=== Week 13: at Seattle Seahawks ===
Week 13: San Francisco 49ers at Seattle Seahawks – Game summary

Quarter	1	2	3	4	Total
49ers	7	7	0	3	17
Seahawks	7	7	0	6	20

at Qwest Field, Seattle

- Date: December 6
- Game time: 4:15 p.m. EST/1:15 pm PST
- Game weather: 35 °F (2 °C) (Mostly Cloudy)
- Game attendance: 67,761
- Referee: Alberto Riveron
- TV announcers (Fox): Chris Myers, Ross Tucker & Jaime Maggio

With the loss, the 49ers dropped to 5–7.

=== Week 14: vs. Arizona Cardinals ===
Week 14: Arizona Cardinals at San Francisco 49ers – Game summary

Quarter	1	2	3	4	Total
Cardinals	0	0	3	6	9
49ers	10	7	0	7	24

at Candlestick Park, San Francisco

- Date: December 14
- Game time: 8:30 p.m. EST/5:30 pm PST
- Game weather: 52 °F (11 °C) (Cloudy)
- Game attendance: 69,732
- Referee: Jerome Boger
- TV announcers (ESPN): Mike Tirico, Ron Jaworski, Jon Gruden & Michele Tafoya

Once again showing up on MNF, the 49ers came home to face off against the surging Cardinals. It was soon evident however, that the Cardinals were not playing their best, turning over the football 7 times, and to add to their troubles the 49ers capitalized on all of their mistakes. In the end, the 49ers' 3 touchdowns were too much for the Cardinals, and the 49ers not only prevented Arizona from clinching the NFC West, but also avoided getting eliminated from the playoff race, improving to 6–7.

=== Week 15: at Philadelphia Eagles ===
Week 15: San Francisco 49ers at Philadelphia Eagles – Game summary

Quarter	1	2	3	4	Total
49ers	3	0	10	0	13
Eagles	7	13	0	7	27

at Lincoln Financial Field, Philadelphia

- Date: December 20
- Game time: 4:15 p.m. EST/1:15 pm PST
- Game weather: 32 °F (0 °C) (Mostly Cloudy)
- Game attendance: 69,144
- Referee: Don Carey
- TV announcers (Fox): Kenny Albert, Daryl Johnston & Tony Siragusa

With the loss, the 49ers fell to 6–8 and were eventually eliminated from the playoff contention.

=== Week 16: vs. Detroit Lions ===
Week 16: Detroit Lions at San Francisco 49ers – Game summary

Quarter	1	2	3	4	Total
Lions	3	0	0	3	6
49ers	3	3	14	0	20

at Candlestick Park, San Francisco

- Date: December 27
- Game time: 4:05 p.m. EST/1:05 pm PST
- Game weather: 54 °F (12 °C) (Sunny)
- Game attendance: 69,732
- Referee: Walt Anderson
- TV announcers (Fox): Dick Stockton & Charles Davis

For their last home game of the season, the San Francisco 49ers took on the visiting team the Lions. The Lions took an early lead midway through the 1st quarter with a 27-yard Jason Hanson field goal. The 49ers tied it up at the end of the 1st quarter with a 33-yard field goal by Ricky Schmitt. The only score of the 2nd quarter was a 39-yard 49ers field goal just before halftime. In the 3rd quarter came 2 San Francisco TD's. First a 2-yard catch by Vernon Davis, then a 1-yard run by Frank Gore. The Lions kicked their final field goal of the day in the 4th quarter from 38 yards.

49ers RB Frank Gore finished with 152 total yards (110 alone in the third quarter) and a touchdown. Gore carried 28 times for 71 yards to give him 1,013 for the year, making him the first running back in team history to record four straight seasons of over 1,000 yards rushing.

Also with the win, the 49ers improved to 7–8

=== Week 17: at St. Louis Rams ===
Week 17: San Francisco 49ers at St. Louis Rams – Game summary

Quarter	1	2	3	4	Total
49ers	0	0	7	21	28
Rams	0	3	0	3	6

at Edward Jones Dome, St. Louis

- Date: January 3, 2010
- Game time: 1:00 p.m. EST/10:00 am PST
- Game weather: None (Domed Stadium)
- Game attendance: 47,965
- Referee: Mike Carey
- TV announcers (Fox): Matt Vasgersian & Ross Tucker

With the win, the 49ers were good enough to finish their season 8–8 and 2nd place in the NFC West. It also marked their first non-losing season since 2002.

== Standings ==
NFC West
	W	L	T	PCT	DIV	CONF	PF	PA	STK
^{(4)} Arizona Cardinals	10	6	0	.625	4–2	8–4	375	325	L1
San Francisco 49ers	8	8	0	.500	5–1	7–5	330	281	W2
Seattle Seahawks	5	11	0	.313	3–3	4–8	280	390	L4
St. Louis Rams	1	15	0	.063	0–6	1–11	175	436	L8
