= Mike Singletary =

American football player and coach (born 1958)

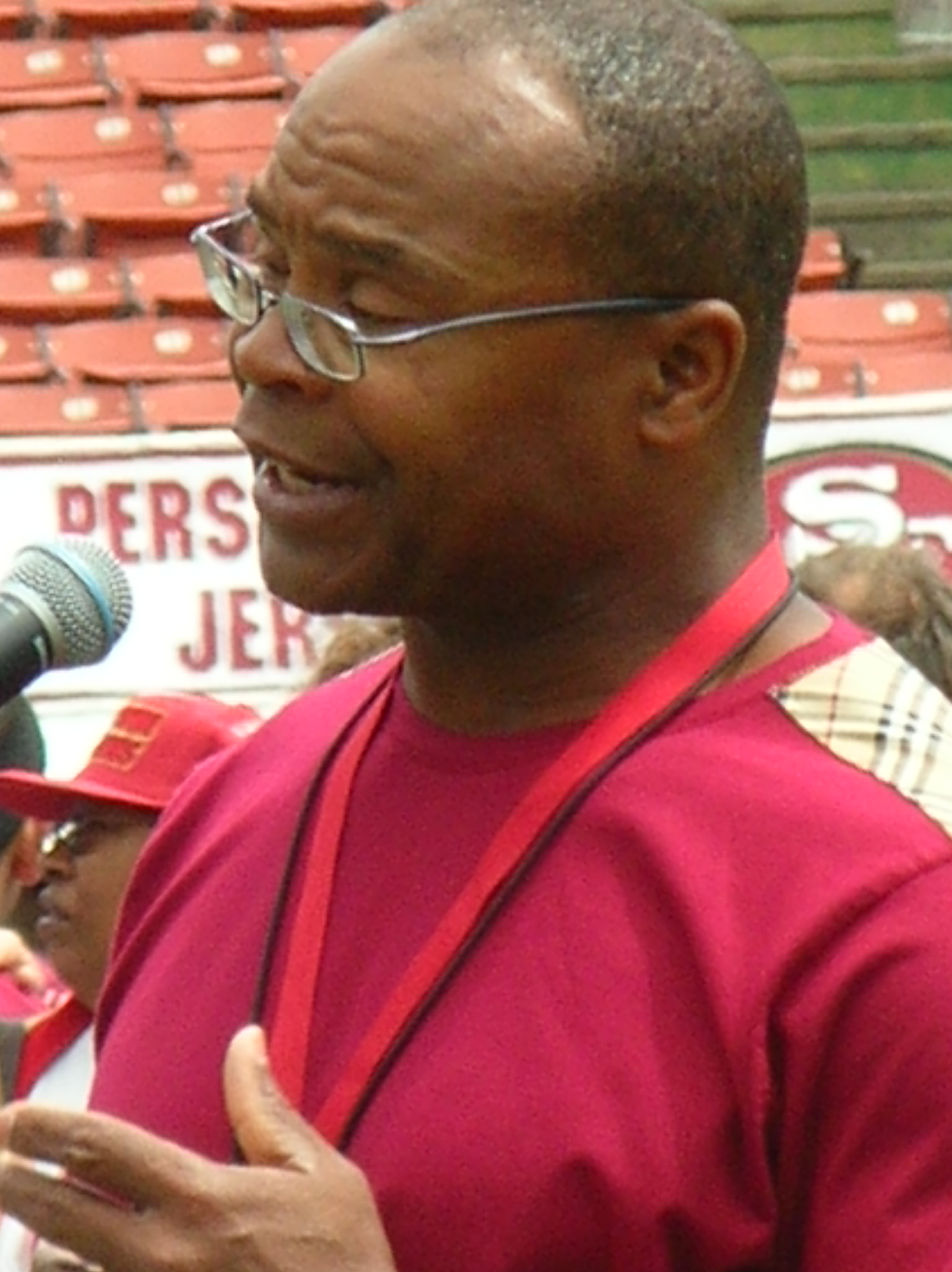
- Singletary with the San Francisco 49ers in 2009

No. 50
- Position: Linebacker

Personal information
- Born: October 9, 1958 (age 68); Houston, Texas, U.S.
- Listed height: 6 ft 0 in (1.83 m)
- Listed weight: 230 lb (104 kg)

Career information
- High school: Worthing (Houston)
- College: Baylor (1977–1980)
- NFL draft: 1981: 2nd round, 38th overall pick

Career history

Playing
- Chicago Bears (1981–1992)

Coaching
- Baltimore Ravens (2003–2004) Linebackers coach; San Francisco 49ers (2005–2010); Assistant head coach & linebackers coach (2005–2008); Interim head coach (2008); Head coach (2009–2010); Minnesota Vikings (2011–2013) Special assistant head coach & linebackers coach; Los Angeles Rams (2016) Defensive assistant; Trinity Christian (TX) (2018–2019) Head coach; Memphis Express (2019) Head coach; TSL Generals (2020) Defensive coordinator

Awards and highlights
- As a player: Super Bowl champion (XX); 2× NFL Defensive Player of the Year (1985, 1988); NFL Man of the Year (1990); 7× First-team All-Pro (1984–1989, 1991); Second-team All-Pro (1990); 10× Pro Bowl (1983–1992); NFL 1980s All-Decade Team; PFWA All-Rookie Team (1981); 100 greatest Bears of All-Time; Unanimous All-American (1980); Consensus All-American (1979); 2× Davey O'Brien Memorial Trophy (1979, 1980); 2× SWC Player of the Year (1979, 1980); 3× First-team All-SWC (1978–1980); As a coach: TSL champion (2020)

Career NFL statistics
- Tackles: 1,488
- Interceptions: 7
- Interception yards: 44
- Fumble recoveries: 12
- Sacks: 19.0
- Stats at Pro Football Reference

Head coaching record
- Career: NFL: 18–22 (.450); AAF: 2–6 (.250)
- Coaching profile at Pro Football Reference
- Pro Football Hall of Fame
- College Football Hall of Fame

Michael Singletary (born October 9, 1958), nicknamed "Samurai Mike", is an American former professional football player and coach. He played as a linebacker for the Chicago Bears of the National Football League (NFL). After playing college football for the Baylor Bears, Singletary was selected by the Bears in the second round of the 1981 NFL draft and was known as "the Heart of the Defense" for their Monsters of the Midway defense in the mid-1980s. He was part of their Super Bowl XX championship team that beat the New England Patriots. Singletary was inducted into the Texas Sports Hall of Fame in 1995 and into the Pro Football Hall of Fame in 1998.

Singletary later pursued a career as a coach, first as a linebackers coach for the Baltimore Ravens, then as the linebackers coach for the San Francisco 49ers. In 2008, the 49ers promoted Singletary to the head coaching position after previous head coach Mike Nolan was fired during the season, and he remained in that position until he was fired after the 49ers were eliminated from playoff contention with one game remaining in the 2010 season. He has also coached for the Los Angeles Rams, the Memphis Express of the now-defunct Alliance of American Football (AAF), and a brief two-season stint as the head coach of a high school team.

== Early life ==
Mike Singletary was born in Houston, the last of ten children. Singletary's father, Charles, was a street preacher in Dallas. The family soon settled in Houston. Mike, along with his father, Charles, mother, Rudell, and several brothers and sisters, shared a small wood-frame home. Next to their home was a building called the Church of God, a church that Charles Singletary built himself and where he played guitar each Sunday. During the week, Mike's father worked as a contractor.

Tragedy would soon strike the family. Dale Singletary, the third oldest child, died unexpectedly. Dale had been sleeping in a room with James, another brother. Charles Jr. noticed a funny smell coming from the room. By the time Mike and Charles Jr. were able to break a window, and force entry into the room, fumes from the coal stove had claimed the life of Dale. As his relationship with his father drifted, Mike's brother Grady stepped in. Grady filled the void, telling young Mike to stay away from vices such as drinking beer and smoking cigarettes. Mike's interest in playing football piqued each Sunday, as he would watch the Dallas Cowboys, and idolized players including Roger Staubach, Bob Lilly, and Lee Roy Jordan.

Tragedy re-occurred. Grady, who Mike Singletary had looked up at as a father figure, was killed in a six-car accident caused by a drunk driver. The drunk driver survived the accident uninjured.

Singletary attended high school at Evan E. Worthing High School in Houston. In ninth grade, Mike was an all-state guard and linebacker. As Mike became a star for Worthing High School, an all-black high school, Mike's mother became a regular at the football games. Despite early concerns about poor grades affecting Mike's eligibility to play football, his grades improved. After a star career at Worthing, Mike found himself with a scholarship to Baylor University, and would meet the next mentor in his life, Baylor coach Grant Teaff.

== College career ==
Mike Singletary attended college at Baylor University in Waco, Texas. As a linebacker at Baylor, Singletary earned All-American honors in both junior (1979) and senior (1980) years, where he averaged 15 tackles per game and established a team record with 232 tackles in 1978, including 35 in a game against the University of Houston. During Singletary's senior season of 1980, Baylor won 10 games, marking the first time in school history that had been accomplished.

Singletary is the only college junior to be selected to the All-Southwest Conference Team of the 1970s. Singletary is a two-time recipient of the Davey O'Brien Memorial Trophy, which at the time was awarded to the most outstanding player among those playing in the southwestern United States and had yet to become the quarterback-centric award it is today. Singletary lettered four years. He had 97 tackles as a freshman, 232 (a school record) as a sophomore, then 188 and 145. The total, 662, set a school record. In 1978, he had 35 tackles in a game against Arkansas, 31 against Ohio State. He was all- Southwest Conference three years and All-America two years. In 1979 and 1980, he won the Davey O'Brien Award, given to the outstanding player in the Southwest. (The award has since been changed to a national quarterback trophy.)

== Professional career ==
Singletary was selected 38th overall in the second round of the 1981 NFL Draft. At 6 ft (1.8 m), 230 lb (100 kg), Singletary became a starting linebacker in the Chicago Bears defense in the eighth game of his rookie season (1981). In a game against the Kansas City Chiefs, his third as a starter, Singletary gave a remarkable defensive performance, recording 10 tackles and forcing a fumble. He was a nearly unanimous all-rookie selection. Singletary started 172 games for the Bears during his 12-year career, the second-most in club history. An intense player, he finished as the Bears' first- or second-leading tackler each of his last 11 seasons. He amassed an impressive 1,488 career tackles, 885 of which were solo efforts. He missed playing just two games, both in 1986. He made 7 interceptions and 12 fumble recoveries.

In a game against the Denver Broncos in 1990 he had a personal-best performance when he recorded 10 solo tackles and 10 assists. Selected to play in a team record 10 Pro Bowls, Singletary was All-Pro eight times, and All-NFC every year from 1983 to 1991.

He led the Bears to a 15–1 season in 1985. The "46" defense invented by Buddy Ryan allowed Singletary to be unblocked on virtually every play. That season, he recorded 109 solo tackles (52 assists), 3 sacks, 1 interception, 3 fumble recoveries, 1 forced fumble, and 10 defended passes. He won the NFL Defensive Player of the Year, and led a defense that was ranked 1st overall (1st against the rush; 3rd against the pass).

Throughout the 1985 playoffs, Singletary provided stellar efforts in all 3 games. In the divisional game against the New York Giants at home, Singletary recovered a fumble early in the 1st quarter and a sack of quarterback Phil Simms on a 3rd down early in the 3rd quarter. The Bears went on to win 21–0. In the NFC Championship Game vs. the Los Angeles Rams, Singletary and the Bears dominated again. Coach Mike Ditka said that the day before the game, he was talking to the offense while Singletary was in the next room giving the defense a motivational speech. While it started out quiet, within minutes, Samurai Mike was screaming at the top of his lungs and the defensive players were throwing chairs and knocking over tables. The next day, he provided a memorable play where he stopped Eric Dickerson behind the line of scrimmage on third-and-short early in the 2nd quarter. The Bears would eventually go to win Super Bowl XX by beating the New England Patriots 46–10. In the game, Singletary broke up a pass that would have gone for a touchdown, delivered jarring hits to New England running back Craig James all game, and tied a Super Bowl record with 2 fumble recoveries.

'1985 Chicago Bears Visit the White House' - video from White House

Singletary was named NFL Defensive Player of the Year by the Associated Press in 1985 and 1988 and received the Bart Starr Award in 1991. He was elected to the College Football Hall of Fame in 1995 and to the Pro Football Hall of Fame in 1998. In 1999, he was ranked number 56 on The Sporting News' list of the 100 Greatest Football Players.

== Coaching career ==
=== Early career ===
In 2002, a group of alumni at Baylor University promoted Singletary for the school's open head coaching position, holding a conference call (which included Mike Ditka and Dave McGinnis) with the university administration. The position ultimately went to Guy Morriss. Singletary at the time had no head or assistant coaching experience and the university president later stated that they wanted to hire a coach with prior "head coaching experience."

In 2003, Singletary became the linebackers coach for the Baltimore Ravens.

Following the 2004 season, the San Francisco 49ers hired Ravens defensive coordinator Mike Nolan to be their head coach, and Singletary left the Ravens with Nolan to be San Francisco's assistant head coach and linebackers coach. In 2007, Singletary interviewed for the head coaching job of the Dallas Cowboys and San Diego Chargers, but was ultimately passed over.

With Morriss leaving Baylor after the 2007 season, Singletary appeared to be the leading candidate for his replacement, and expressed interest in the job. On November 19, 2007, Baylor athletic director Ian McCaw flew to San Francisco to interview Singletary. However, Singletary decided against taking the position, which instead went to Art Briles. Singletary's son Matt was a freshman on the Baylor team in 2007.

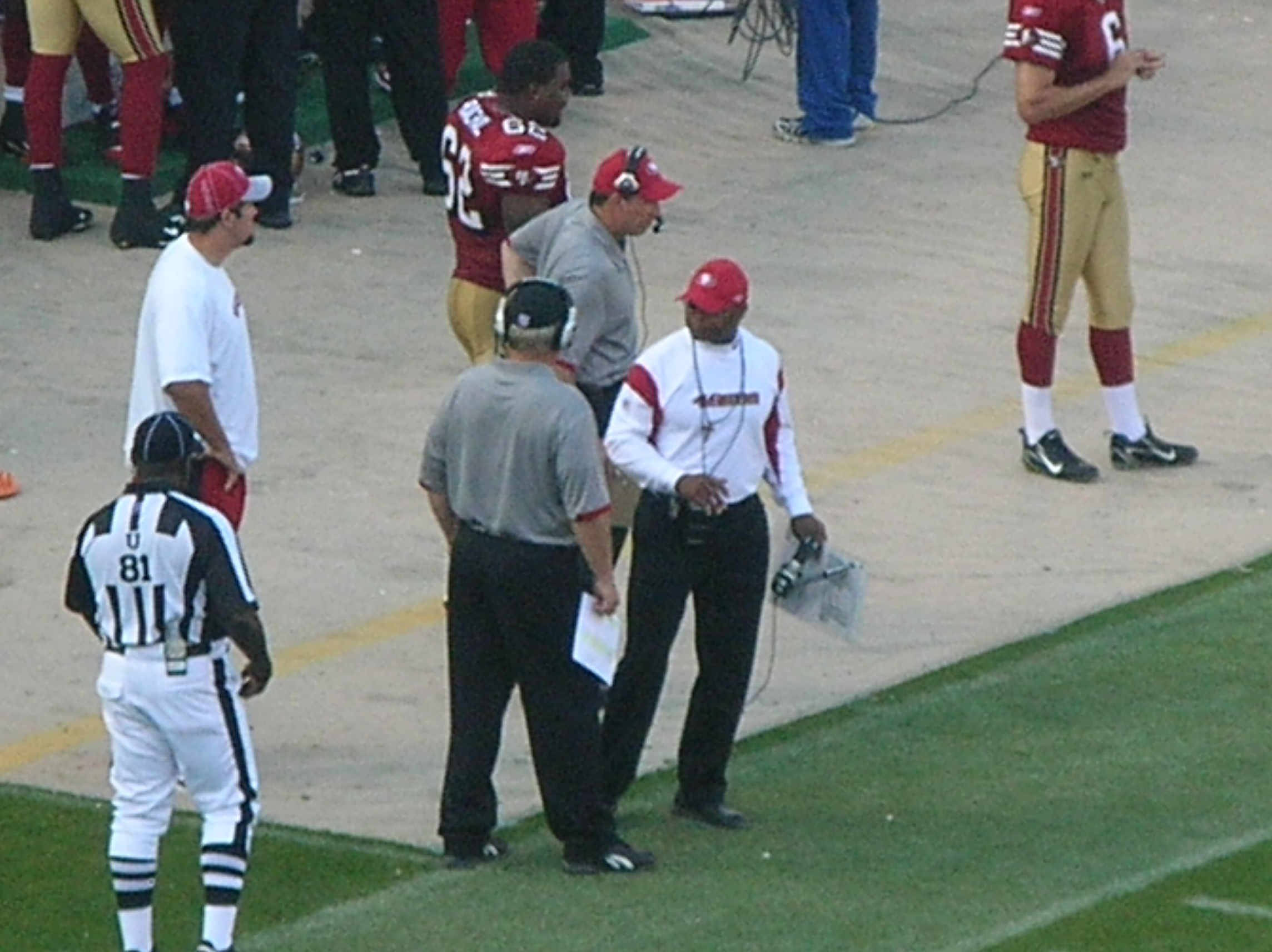
Singletary (center) during a game against the St. Louis Rams on November 16, 2008

=== San Francisco 49ers ===
==== 2008 season ====
Singletary became the interim head coach of the 49ers after Nolan was fired on October 20, 2008. Singletary instantly made a statement in San Francisco by sending tight end Vernon Davis to the locker room with more than 10 minutes remaining in his head coaching debut, a 34–13 loss to the Seattle Seahawks on October 26, 2008. Davis was penalized 15 yards for slapping Seattle safety Brian Russell after a reception. In a post-game press conference, Singletary called Davis' actions "uncoachable" and said that he would rather play with a 10-man squad than have to deal with an apathetic 11-man squad. He boldly declared in that same speech, "I want winners!", which became a staple on billboards around the Bay Area during his coaching tenure. It was later reported that during halftime of their game against the Seahawks, Singletary intentionally dropped his pants while giving a speech to illustrate just how poorly the 49ers had played in the first half.

Taking over the 2–5 49ers team, Singletary was able to finish the season 5–4 under his leadership (for a final team record of 7–9). On December 28, 2008, after a 27–24 come-from-behind victory over the Washington Redskins, Singletary was offered the team's long-term head coaching position, and signed a four-year, $10 million contract as the 49ers' head coach.

==== 2009 season ====
After leading the 49ers to a positive finish in 2008, Singletary helped the team jump out to a 3–1 overall start in the 2009 season. Despite a last-second loss to the Brett Favre-led Minnesota Vikings in week 3, the 49ers recorded wins against the reigning NFC champion Arizona Cardinals and NFC West divisional rival Seattle Seahawks and St. Louis Rams.

While the 49ers were being blown out by the visiting Atlanta Falcons in week 5, Singletary lost his temper over his team's poor play; afterward, he expressed remorse for his actions, saying how he wished he "had more coaching etiquette" while reiterating how he would "get better at those things as time goes on." In the weeks to come, Singletary and offensive coordinator Jimmy Raye would drastically alter the 49ers' game plan, opting to start quarterback Alex Smith in place of Shaun Hill while adopting more of a spread offense. The new game plan had mixed results, as the 49ers posted a 2–5 record from week 7 to week 13 and struggled to maintain their playoff hopes. In a week 14 Monday Night Football matchup against the Arizona Cardinals, however, Singletary and his coaching staff were better able to integrate running back Frank Gore into the spread offense and pulled off an impressive 24–9 victory.

With this momentum and their slim playoff hopes still alive, the 49ers visited the Philadelphia Eagles in week 15, and lost 27–13. After the game, a disappointed Singletary emphasized his team's continued need to improve, but still backed Smith as the team's starting quarterback. Singletary helped the 49ers end the season on a high note with victories against the Detroit Lions and St. Louis Rams to reach 8–8, the team's first non-losing season since 2002.

Five players on the 2009 team were named to play in the NFL Pro Bowl. Those players were Patrick Willis, Andy Lee, Vernon Davis, Frank Gore, and Justin Smith.

Also in 2009, Singletary joined other members of the 1985 Chicago Bears in resurrecting the Super Bowl Shuffle for a Boost Mobile commercial broadcast during Super Bowl XLIV.

==== 2010 season ====
The 49ers began the 2010 season with an 0–5 record, marking their worst start since 1979. The team's first win of the season came in week 6 by defeating the Oakland Raiders. In week 10, San Francisco narrowly defeated the St. Louis Rams, 23–20 in overtime. At home, the 49ers suffered their first home shut out since October 3, 1977, in a 21–0 loss to the Tampa Bay Buccaneers on November 21. A rematch occurred with the Rams on December 26, which the 49ers lost 25–17, eliminating them from playoff contention. After the game the 49ers fired Singletary. Defensive line coach Jim Tomsula took over for the final week of the season.

=== Minnesota Vikings ===
On January 18, 2011, Singletary confirmed that he had agreed to join the Minnesota Vikings coaching staff as the linebackers coach/assistant to the head coach, former Bears teammate Leslie Frazier, a position he would hold through the 2013 season.

=== Los Angeles Rams ===
After being out of the league since 2014, Singletary interviewed with the New York Giants for their vacant linebacking coach position. Giants head coach Ben McAdoo and Singletary both worked together with the 49ers in 2005. The Giants eventually hired former Philadelphia Eagles assistant Bill McGovern for the position.

On June 28, 2016, Singletary announced in an interview with a radio station that he would be returning to the coaching ranks as an advisor for the Los Angeles Rams defense. The move reunited Singletary with former Bears teammate and then-Rams head coach Jeff Fisher.

=== Memphis Express ===
On May 10, 2018, Singletary was named head coach of the Memphis Express of the Alliance of American Football. The Express went 2–6 before the league cancelled the rest of the season. The league eventually ceased operations altogether.

=== High school coaching ===
On March 29, 2018, Singletary accepted a job at Trinity Christian Academy in Addison, Texas. He left the school in December 2019 after going 1–21 in two seasons.

== Head coaching record ==
=== National Football League ===
Team	Year	Regular season					Postseason			
Team	Year	Won	Lost	Ties	Win %	Finish	Won	Lost	Win %	Result
SF	2008*	5	4	0	.556	2nd in NFC West	—	—	—	—
SF	2009	8	8	0	.500	2nd in NFC West	—	—	—	—
SF	2010	5	10	0	.333	Fired	—	—	—	—
Total		18	22	0	.450		0	0	.000	

* Interim head coach

=== Alliance of American Football ===
Team	Year	Regular season					Postseason			
Team	Year	Won	Lost	Ties	Win %	Finish	Won	Lost	Win %	Result
MEM	2019	2	6	0	.250	3rd in Eastern Conference	—	—	—	—
Total		2	6	0	.250		0	0	.000	

=== High school ===
Team	Year	Regular season			Postseason			
Team	Year	Won	Lost	Win %	Won	Lost	Win %	Result
Trinity	2018	1	10	.091	—	—	—	—
Trinity	2019	0	11	.000	—	—	—	—
Trinity		1	21	.045	0	0	.000	

== Additional pursuits ==
Singletary is a motivational speaker and an ordained minister.

He has co-authored several books:

- Calling the Shots: Mike Singletary (with Armen Keteyian), McGraw-Hill Contemporary, 1986. ISBN 0-8092-4881-6
- Singletary on Singletary (with Jerry B. Jenkins), Thomas Nelson Inc., 1991. ISBN 0-8407-7654-3
- Daddy's Home at Last What It Takes for Dads to Put Families First (with Russ Pate), Zondervan, 1998. ISBN 0-310-21569-2
- Singletary One-on-One (with Jay Carty), Regal Books, 2005. ISBN 0-8307-3702-2

Singletary was a contestant on the first season of the CBS reality series Beyond the Edge, which premiered in March 2022.

== Personal life ==
Singletary, an ordained minister, is a devout evangelical Christian. Singletary said in an interview with The 700 Club, "To me, Christ means everything. I know that He's got my back no matter what I do. So that gives me all the freedom in the world to be the man that He's called me to be."

Singletary and his wife, Kim, have seven children. His son Matt joined Baylor University's roster in 2007 as a freshman defensive end. However, Matt transferred to California Polytechnic State University where he was a defensive end. Singletary's nephew, Vantz, was a linebackers coach at Liberty University and previously coached under Mike when he coached with the 49ers.
