= Logos and uniforms of the San Francisco 49ers =

The evolution of the 49ers' uniform, 1946–2009.

The logo and uniforms of the San Francisco 49ers have evolved since their inception in 1946.

== The early years (1946–1963) ==
The 49ers changed uniform designs and color combinations quite often in their first eighteen years of existence. From the team's inception in 1946 through the early 1960s, the San Francisco 49ers usually wore red, white or silver helmets, white or light-gray pants, and cardinal red (home) and white (road) jerseys. The 49ers' original logo was a mustached 49er gold miner from the 1849 California Gold Rush, dressed in plaid pants and a red shirt, jumping in midair with his hat falling off, and fired pistols in each hand: one nearly shooting his foot, and the other pistol forming the word "Forty-Niners" from its smoke. By the mid-1950s this logo showed the prospector jumping against a backdrop of Kezar Stadium, the team's home from 1946 to 1970.

Original uniforms consisted of plain red jerseys with white front and back numerals and no trim. Pants were white, and leather helmets were in several colors. In 1950, concurrent with the team's admission to the NFL, the red jersey gained three parallel white stripes on the sleeves; this feature, with modifications and updates, has been implemented on the team's jersey ever since. Also around this time, the helmets were gradually changed over to a silver-colored plastic. An entirely new look appeared in 1953; helmets were red with a silver center stripe. White pants were given a thin red-black-red tri-stripe. For the 1954 season silver-grey pants were introduced, and in the 1955 season the jersey numerals gained black trim that created a "dropshadow" effect. These 1955 jerseys, along with white pants, served as the model for the team's "throwback" uniform in its championship 1994 season. Red socks included three white stripes. In 1956 the helmet was changed to solid white and the black outlining and shadowing effect was eliminated from the jersey numerals. The pants striping became solid red. In 1957 the 49er uniform was altered again; helmets were made gold, accompanied by beige-gold, unstriped pants. Jerseys and socks remained the same, but in accordance with the NFL's 1957 rule ordering primary-colored "home" and light "road" shirts for each team, the 49ers debuted white road jerseys with three parallel sleeve stripes; the middle stripe was red, the top and bottom gold. This striping was replaced in 1958 by a wide red crescent shoulder stripe. So-called "TV Numbers" appeared on both jerseys in the same year.

Throughout the middle and late 1950s, and the early 1960s, the 49ers were one of just a few NFL teams (the Chicago Bears were most prominent) to use helmets made by Chicago-based Wilson Sporting Goods; these helmets were of slightly different shape than those made by the Riddell company, which for more than a half-century have been a prominent supplier of NFL team headgear. Yet another radical alteration was made to the 49er uniform in 1960. Appearing were silver helmets with three widely spaced red stripes; the center stripe was thicker. Home jerseys were unchanged, but road jerseys featured a new dual crescent shoulder stripe in what is usually called the "UCLA" style. An alternate logo was designed in the 1960s featuring a shield-shaped crest formed from the number "49", with a football in the upper right quadrant and "SF" in the lower left quadrant. In 1962 the helmet was redesigned to feature a red-white-red triple center stripe (the white middle stripe was wider). The earliest version of San Francisco's current primary logo, an intertwined white "SF" within the center of a red oval, also debuted in the 1962 helmet design. By 1972-73 the oval was slightly smaller in size and gained a thicker black border.

== A more standard look (1964–1988) ==
The team's colors then changed in 1964. All silver elements were changed to what was called "49ers Gold;" helmets were gold, with the same striping and logo. New beige-gold pants with a red-white-red Tristripe in the same style as the helmet were introduced. The scarlet red jerseys kept the traditional three white sleeve stripes, but road jerseys abandoned the previous dual crescent shoulder stripes in favor of three red sleeve stripes (the converse of the home jersey). The red home jerseys had white block numbers, three white parallel stripes on the sleeves, and smaller white block "TV" numbers above these stripes on the upper sleeve, with the color scheme reversed for the white road jersey. The red elliptical helmet logo was made slightly smaller in 1971-72 and received a thicker black border around the oval. From 1964 to 1971, the team's gold pants were unique in that they consisted of two varying colored panels: a more lustrous gold fabric was used on the rear portion of the pants and a lighter-hued, less lustrous beige fabric on the front. This pants design was abandoned from 1972 onwards for a more uniform, subdued beige. On very few occasions from 1971-1973, when traveling to play against teams in warm-weather venues that wore white jerseys at home such as the Los Angeles Rams and New Orleans Saints, the 49ers would don thinner mesh-fabric red jerseys that were missing the usual sleeve stripes and TV numbers. There was also a white version of this warm-weather jersey that was worn on even rarer occasions.

The 1964 uniform's basic design would be worn for practically the next thirty seasons with only some minor changes and adjustments, such as a gradual change over from sans-serif to serifed block numerals from 1970–74 and a switch from thin stripes to a very thick pant striping in 1976 (during which white jerseys were also worn at home for most of that season). The uniform ensemble of red and white jerseys, and beige-gold pants with thick striping would be worn until 1995 (as well as for throwback games from 2002–08). Starting in 1984, there was a change in the numeral font (the number "2" was made a squarer block numeral), along with the gradual incorporation of serifed letters for players' names on the back of the jerseys (completed by the 1986 season). Also for the 1986 season, the 49ers incorporated a special 40th anniversary patch sewn on the pants along the side of the hips. At the conclusion of the 1988 season, in what would be Coach Bill Walsh's final game, five 49ers (including quarterback Joe Montana) would wear red jerseys from circa the 1984 season (distinguishable by thicker sleeve stripes and sans-serif lettering for players' names) during the team's Super Bowl XXIII victory.

== 1989–1993 ==
In 1989, the 49ers' jerseys were further slightly altered with the stripes on the sleeves being made less bold and arranged closer together (sleeves on NFL jerseys began to get shorter and closer to the shoulder around this time). As for the team's helmet logo, black outlining on the intertwined "SF" was also added in 1989. For the 1991 season, concurrent with the rest of the teams in the NFL, the 49ers incorporated a small NFL Shield logo sewn on the bottom of the jersey's collar and front of the pants for the first time (this would be replaced with a redesigned "NFL Equipment" Shield logo for the 2002 season).

Prior to the 1991 season, the 49ers announced a prototype for a new logo and helmet design. Instead of the traditional "SF" oval, this new logo featured a stylized "49ers" in white with black and red shadows, along with a red facemask. However, fan reaction was so overwhelmingly negative that the idea was scrapped the next day. The only carryover from the 1991 planned uniform change (and the last significant change to the 1964–1995 uniform design) was the switch from red socks with three white stripes to solid red socks.

== 1994–1995 ==
During the 1994 season, many NFL teams wore "throwback uniforms" in occasional games (beginning with week 3 of the season) to celebrate the NFL's 75th anniversary (a corresponding diamond-shaped 75th Anniversary patch was also worn by all teams). The 49ers chose to wear a version of their 1955 uniforms as their throwbacks, with simpler sans-serif block numerals that had black outlines and blockshadows (the smaller TV numerals above the shoulder stripes however, were removed as they were non-existent on the original 1950s jerseys). White pants with thinner red-black-red striping were also worn, along with the old striped red socks (the team later reverted to their regular solid red socks after receiving permission from the NFL to wear the uniforms for the rest of the season). The regular 1989–95 design gold helmet was worn with this uniform, as there was no logo on the 1955 red helmet.

The team first donned the 1955 throwback uniforms during their week 3 match against the Los Angeles Rams and the following week at home versus the Saints, with both being wins (coincidentally, these were also the first two games Deion Sanders played after signing as a free-agent with the 49ers). The team then suffered an embarrassing 40–8 loss to the Philadelphia Eagles at home wearing their regular uniforms with gold pants, with Steve Young angrily being benched to prevent his injury. For the subsequent three games until their bye week, the team again was scheduled to play games wearing the throwback uniforms with white pants and blockshadow numerals, and all three games resulted in wins. As the 49ers embarked during the following weeks on what would eventually be a 10-game winning streak that ultimately culminated in a Super Bowl XXIX victory, the team (prompted both by the superstition of then coach George Seifert, as well as the preference of players) petitioned the NFL to wear the throwback uniforms for the rest of the season, which was granted. The switch to solid red socks after the team's BYE week in the middle of the season marked this occurrence. In all the 49ers went 15–1 (including the playoffs) wearing the 1955/1994 throwback uniforms (the only loss being the regular season finale on the road at Minnesota, with the team wearing white jerseys and resting most of their starters for the playoffs). Meanwhile, the 49ers went undefeated wearing the red jerseys of the throwback uniform. After winning Super Bowl XXIX, however, the team was compelled to revert to wearing its regular 1964-style uniforms (1991 revised design) for the following 1995 season.

== 1996: 50th Anniversary Uniform change ==
In 1996, the 49ers celebrated their 50th anniversary by designing a commemorative jersey patch based on the earlier shield-crest logo. The team also debuted a substantially new uniform design, most notably changing the shade of red used in their jerseys from bright scarlet to a deeper, cardinal red. The smaller TV numerals were moved from the side of the upper sleeve above the sleeve striping to the top of the shoulderpads. Other new modifications to the uniform showed marked influence from the 1994 throwback uniforms: a black blockshadow effect (along with gold trim) was added to the jersey numerals (which remained in the blocked serif style). Black trim was added on the sleeve stripes as well, which also now featured an updated oval "SF" logo. The team's helmet underwent a major redesign as well in 1996. The updated oval logo (now in cardinal red) had a more stylized, "stretched" black border along with gold trimming, while the intertwined "SF" had thicker black bordering and shadows. For the helmet's color a shinier, more metallic gold was used, while the helmet striping was changed from red-white-red to black-cardinal-black. The old gray-colored facemask was also switched to a cardinal-red colored one. As in 1994, the Niners donned white pants full-time for the 1996 season (also wearing them for the 1996 season and 1997 preseason,) though this time the pant stripes were marginally thicker and the colors were reversed to black-cardinal red-black (matching the striping on the helmets). The socks remained solid-colored, though switched to the darker cardinal red.

== 2006–2008 ==
For the 2006 regular season opener, the team made a surprise switch back to gold pants, only this time to match the helmet it was a shinier, more metallic gold rather than the previous beige-matte gold of the past. The striping along the side of the pants remained black-cardinal red-black, though a thin gold trimming was added, along with further oval "SF" logos placed on both sides of the hip. The 1996 helmet and jersey design with the 2008-09 gold pants would be worn as the team's regular uniforms until the end of the 2008 season.

From the 2006 until 2009, the 49ers nearly always wore their white uniforms at home for their two preseason home games (and thus usually wore white jerseys the whole preseason,) while the team wore red for all eight regular season home games. Since 2006, the 49ers have worn red jerseys for all home games including preseason. The team also is occasionally compelled to wear red on the road when visiting warm-weather opponents early in the season (if that opponent elects to wear their white jerseys), or if an opponent's established home jersey is white, such as the Dallas Cowboys (and on most occasions the Washington Redskins and Miami Dolphins).

Starting in 2008, the 49ers regularly used their 1980s-style (1989 version) scarlet and beige-gold uniform as alternate uniforms for one or two home games (usually for "Alumni Day" and around Christmas). In all, the team would wear the retro uniforms on eight occasions:

- 2006 – vs. Minnesota and Arizona
- 2007 – vs. Arizona (Season Opener in honor of Bill Walsh) and St. Louis
- 2008 – vs. Seattle and Washington

During the 2006 season, the 60th anniversary of the team's inception, a commemorative patch was on the jerseys for all games. For the 2007 season, the 49ers began wearing black cleats, following a growing trend among many teams in the NFL.

== 2009 uniform change ==
On February 17, 2009, 49ers.com officially announced new uniforms to be presented to the public during 49ers Draft Day events on April 25, 2009. The showcased design would be adopted for the 2009 NFL season. The uniform change rumors were confirmed by the team's chief operating officer Andy Dolich at the 49ers' State of the Franchise. When asked when they were going to change their uniforms "back to normal", Dolich replied stating, "Stay tuned. Don’t be surprised if you see championship colors back." During the design process of the new 49ers uniforms, considerable input was received from 49ers players, coaches, team alumni and fan focus groups which occurred over a period of two years (2006–08), and was then conveyed to NFL Equipment manufacturer Reebok. The uniforms were revealed on April 25, 2009, during the first day of the draft. 49ers players Patrick Willis, Josh Morgan, Dashon Goldson, Joe Staley, and Moran Norris (each accompanied by 49ers alumni) displayed the new uniforms at the 49ers draft party.

The new uniforms are very similar to the classic design, albeit with several significant changes. The sleeve stripes are now set at an angle to accommodate the even shorter sleeves of modern jerseys, (though the stripes appear straight and parallel to the ground when worn by the players themselves). Because of less room along the side of the sleeves, the secondary "TV" numerals have been moved to the top of the shoulder pads (as in the 1996–2008 jerseys). Meanwhile, a "49ers" wordmark ligature has been included below the collar on the front of the jersey, just below the NFL Equipment shield. The new helmets retained the shinier metallic gold shell color and 1996–2008 stretched oval "SF" logo design (though the oval was in the new brighter shade of red). However, the helmet stripes were reverted to the classic red-white-red order, and the face mask returned to the more traditional color of neutral gray. When the new uniform was debuted the pants remained made of the same lustrous gold material of the 1998–2008 uniform, but by training camp and the preseason the pants were toned down to a duller sheen of flat gold, similar to the 1980s pants but more closely matching the shade of gold used in the new helmets rather than the old khaki/tan. The pants striping is also in the classic red-white-red order, though this time in a more standard, medium width and not the thick striping width of the 1976–1995 pants. Players had complained that the old thick pant stripes on the throwbacks were too restrictive to movement. The new pants also feature zippers along the front, an innovation over the traditional laces used. The team's socks retain a solid red look (and not the throwback uniform style that had three white stripes), again in the new brighter red team color.

Since the 2009 season, the team has chosen not to have any "throwback" games as in recent years (2002–08), as the new uniform is consistent with the "classic" 49ers look of the 1980s. However starting in 2018, the team reintroduced the all white 1994 throwback uniform as an alternate set.

== 2012 Nike uniform update ==
For the 2012 NFL season, (and concurrent with the rest of the teams in the league), the official San Francisco 49ers onfield jersey, pants and socks were manufactured by Nike, along with other uniform paraphernalia (undershirts, gloves and cleats; though the latter two are not mandated for all players). The updated uniform design was revealed alongside those of the rest of the league at an official event organized by the NFL and Nike in Brooklyn, New York on April 3, 2012 (with former 49ers quarterback Alex Smith joining fellow players from each team as models).

For the 49ers' uniforms, not much in the overall appearance was drastically changed and much was carried over from the previous Reebok design (such as the truncated sleeve stripes). Looking to improve the NFL uniform's physical design rather than a wholesale updating of teams' graphic designs, Nike focused changes mainly on the cut, fit and finish of the uniform, basing them on Nike's "Elite 51" uniform template that had already been worn recently by Football Bowl Subdivision college football teams. The new design utilizes more breathable fabrics on the jerseys and pants striping (and more moisture-resistant fabrics overall), and a new stretchable "Flywire" elastic stitching on the jersey collar. In addition, compartments for increased padding around the hip area that truncates the top portion of the pants stripes have been implemented, as well as lighter, aluminum d-rings for securing the belt straps. The former "NFL Equipment" shield of the Reebok era has also been abandoned league-wide in favor of a return to a simpler NFL shield logo on the collar and pants (made from a more rigid synthetic material instead of a fabric patch).-love

== 2015 to present ==
On April 30, 2015 at their NFL draft rally, the team unveiled their first ever alternate uniform (as opposed to a throwback design). The uniform consists of black jerseys and pants with red numerals and striping. Nike logos are in gold, while the standard solid red socks will be worn. These uniforms will be worn a maximum of two games a year, per league rules. For the 2016 season (the 49ers' 70th), the team will once again wear a commemorative patch on the front upper left side of their jerseys, the design being based on the team's early-60's "49 shield crest" alternate logo.

As part of the NFL Color Rush initiative, the 49ers wore their black alternate uniform, but instead of red socks, they replaced the combination with black socks. They wore this combination against the Arizona Cardinals on October 6, 2016. The black alternate uniforms were retired following the 2017 season.

At the 2017 NFL draft a new jersey template designed by Nike debuted for many teams, incorporating subtle changes. Called Vapor Untouchable, the most significant update for the 49ers jersey is a new sleeve stripe design in a thicker width and consisting of only two stripes versus the three stripes of past 49ers jerseys. The tailoring on the collar was also revised.

On May 23, 2018 during the team's State of the Franchise event, the 49ers debuted a new, alternate uniform based on the 1994 white throwback uniforms.

A 75th anniversary patch was revealed by the team for the 2021 season. Like the patch worn in 1994, it is diamond-shaped and is sewn on the upper left region on the front of the team's jerseys. In addition, the red version of their 1994 throwback jerseys was announced on June 30, 2021. In total, the team wore the 1994 throwback uniforms for six games (nearly all of them being their primetime games) for their 75th anniversary season.

On April 25, 2022 (and satisfying the NFL's 5-year policy on updates to uniforms) the 49ers announced the return of a third stripe to the sleeves of the team's standard home and away jerseys. The team also updated the '49ERS' wordmark on the front of the jerseys (beneath the collar) to what it termed the "saloon font" (Quentin Caps), a design the team had previously used from 1972–2005. Both changes were implemented after consulting feedback from the team's fans. In addition, the "saloon font" wordmark would now be incorporated onto the rubber neck bumpers on the back of the players' helmets.

In 2025, the 49ers unveiled a "Rivalries" uniform, which they would wear for three seasons at home against each of their NFC West opponents. The design is primarily black with saloon-style numbers in red with gold trim, and red stripes. Helmets are also black with gold facemasks and red stripes.
