= West-Oak High School =

Public high school in Oconee County, South Carolina, United States

Coordinates: 34.6206546°N 83.0498736°W

Location
- 163 Warrior lane Westminster, South Carolina 29693; United States

Information
- Type: Public high school
- Established: 1983
- Principal: Brandon Blackwell
- Staff: 48.00 (FTE)
- Grades: 9–12
- Enrollment: 798 (2023–2024)
- Student to teacher ratio: 16.62
- Colors: Navy, red, and silver
- Mascot: Warrior
- Website: https://woh.sdoc.org/

West-Oak High School was created by the consolidation of Oakway and Westminster High Schools. The school serves students from approximately one-half of the land area in Oconee County, South Carolina. Both Oakway and Westminster schools had been previously consolidated in the 1960s with Fair Play, and Cleveland community schools. Construction for the new building began in 1982, students entered in the fall of 1983, and the first class graduated in the spring of 1984.

== Athletics ==
The mascot at West Oak is the Warrior

=== Wrestling ===
Wrestling has historically been the program of record at West-Oak, winning ten State Championships in the school's history, including an active streak of five in a row from 2022 through 2026.

West-Oak Wrestling State Championships:

- 1994
- 2011
- 2015
- 2017
- 2018
- 2022
- 2023
- 2024
- 2025
- 2026

== Expansion ==
During the 2010–2011 school year, budgets were given to each school in the Oconee County district. West-Oak used theirs to add onto their school by adding a brand new entrance with new offices as well as a complete new two-story building for more classrooms to be added on. A new lunchroom expansion was also added with new glass walls and several new features.

== Notable alumni ==
- Jared Burton, Major League Baseball pitcher
- Andy Lee, football punter for Arizona Cardinals and Carolina Panthers of National Football League
