= Andy Lee (American football) =

American football player (born 1982)

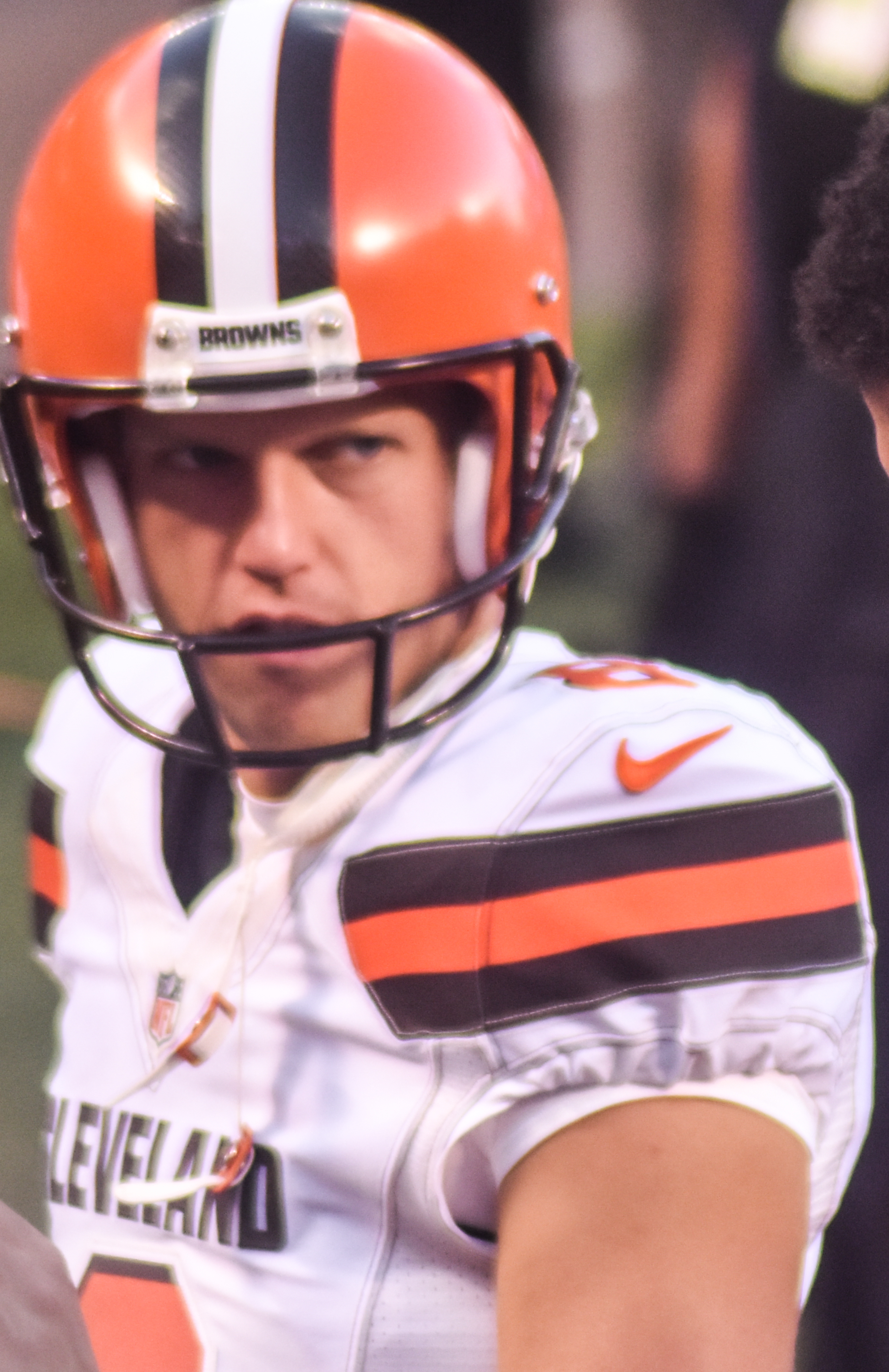
- Lee with the Cleveland Browns in 2015

No. 4, 8, 2, 14
- Position: Punter

Personal information
- Born: August 11, 1982 (age 44); Westminster, South Carolina, U.S.
- Listed height: 6 ft 1 in (1.85 m)
- Listed weight: 185 lb (84 kg)

Career information
- High school: West-Oak (Westminster)
- College: Pittsburgh (2000–2003)
- NFL draft: 2004: 6th round, 188th overall pick

Career history
- San Francisco 49ers (2004–2014); Cleveland Browns (2015); Carolina Panthers (2016); Arizona Cardinals (2017–2022)

Awards and highlights
- 3× First-team All-Pro (2007, 2011, 2012); Second-team All-Pro (2009); 3× Pro Bowl (2007, 2009, 2011); 3× NFL punting yards leader (2005, 2007, 2018); Golden Toe Award (2011); 2× Big East Special Teams Player of the Year (2002, 2003)

Career NFL statistics
- Punts: 1,466
- Punting yards: 68,405
- Punting average: 46.7
- Longest punt: 82
- Inside 20: 476
- Stats at Pro Football Reference

Andrew Paul Lee (born August 11, 1982) is an American former professional football player who was a punter in the National Football League (NFL). He played college football for the Pittsburgh Panthers, and was selected by the San Francisco 49ers in the sixth round of the 2004 NFL draft. Lee also played for the Cleveland Browns, Carolina Panthers, and Arizona Cardinals. He was selected to the Pro Bowl following the 2007, 2009, and 2011 seasons.

== Early life ==
Lee was born in Westminster, South Carolina. He graduated from West-Oak High School in Westminster. At West-Oak High School, Lee was a three-sport star athlete, lettering in football, baseball, and basketball. In football, he punted and played tight end and wide receiver as a senior. His punting average as a senior was 42.8 yards, earning him a 33rd ranking in South Carolina by SuperPrep. Lee was selected twice to All-Conference honors in basketball and helped lead the baseball team to a district championship and the state playoffs. As a pitcher, he went 5–0 as a junior and 8–2 as a senior, with a selection to the North-South Baseball All-Star Game and a Golden and Silver Arm Award.

== College career ==
Lee attended the University of Pittsburgh and played for the Pittsburgh Panthers football team from 2000 to 2003. He was Pittsburgh's starting punter for three seasons after winning the starting role late in true freshman season (2000). His 244 punts and 10,353 yards are tops in school history. Lee had 29 fair catches, 61 kicks downed inside 20-yard line and three blocked kicks. He was the only player to ever win Big East Conference Special Teams Player of the Year honors twice in career. As a senior, Lee was a semi-finalist for the Ray Guy Award, given to college football's top punter. He was also the All-Big East Conference first-team choice and Co-Special Teams Player of the Year.

== Professional career ==
Pre-draft measurables
Height	Weight	Arm length	Hand span	40-yard dash
6 ft 1 in (1.85 m)	207 lb (94 kg)	31 in (0.79 m)	9 1/8 in (0.23 m)	5.00 s
All values from NFL Combine

=== San Francisco 49ers ===
==== 2004 season ====
Following a successful collegiate career, Lee was selected in the sixth round of the NFL Draft with the 188th overall pick by the San Francisco 49ers. Lee had never attended an NFL game growing up in South Carolina. Even when he went on to become a standout punter on the collegiate level at the University of Pittsburgh, he was still a stranger to live NFL action. In Lee's rookie season, he punted 96 times with 25 dropped inside the 20 and an NFL-long of 81 yards. His punting average of 41.6 yards per punt was first time a 49ers punter averaged over 40 yards per punt since Reggie Roby in 1998. Lee also posted seven punts for 338 yards (48.3 avg.), including career-long of 81 yards with one punt downed inside 20-yard line at Tampa Bay (11–21). His 81-yarder was fourth-longest in 49ers history and NFL's longest punt of the year.

==== 2005 season ====
In 2005, Lee set a career-high with 107 punts (41.6 avg.), including 15 punts downed inside the 20. His three touchbacks in 107 punts was third-best ratio of touchbacks-to-punts among punters with 30 or more kicks in 2005, trailing Houston’s Chad Stanley (one touchback in 70 punts) and Detroit's Nick Harris (two touchbacks in 84 punts). His ratio of touchbacks-to-punts is best for any 49ers punter since 1970, topping Joe Prokop (one touchback in 40 punts) in 1991.

==== 2006 season ====
In 2006, Lee registered 81 punts (44.8 avg.) with 22 punts dropped inside the 20-yard line and a net average of 36.8. He finished seventh in NFL with 36.8 net yards, while his 44.8 gross average marked team’s highest since Tommy Davis averaged 45.6 in 1964. Lee was awarded game ball for his efforts in the 20–14 victory vs. Seattle (11–19) when he landed two punts inside the 20-yard line to help the 49ers win the battle of field position. He also grossed 51.5 yards per punt at St. Louis (11–26), which included a season-long of 66 yards.

==== 2007 season ====
Lee earned Pro Bowl and All-Pro honors in 2007 after setting numerous records on 105 punts (47.3 avg.) with a net average of 41.0 and NFL record 42 punts downed inside opponents’ 20-yard line. His yardage, gross average, net average and punts downed inside 20-yard line all set team records. His 4,968 punting yards in 2007 are an NFL single season record. His 42 punts downed inside 20-yard line broke Baltimore's Kyle Richardson's NFL mark of 39 in 1999. His 41.0 net average ranks second all-time in NFL history, trailing only Shane Lechler of Oakland (41.1 in 2007). He ranked second in NFL for gross average (47.3) and net punting average (41.0) to Oakland's Lechler. Also led the NFL with 49 punts over 50+ yards, which was 16 more than second ranked St. Louis’ Donnie Jones (33). Recorded four games in which he dropped four punts inside 20-yard line. Lee played key role in 49ers 37–31 overtime victory at Arizona (11–25), booming a 58-yard punt in overtime that wound up pinning Cardinals on their own three-yard line. The punt helped set up 49ers winning touchdown on DT Ronald Fields sack and forced fumble in the end zone that was recovered by linebacker Tully Banta-Cain for game-winning score.

==== 2008 season ====
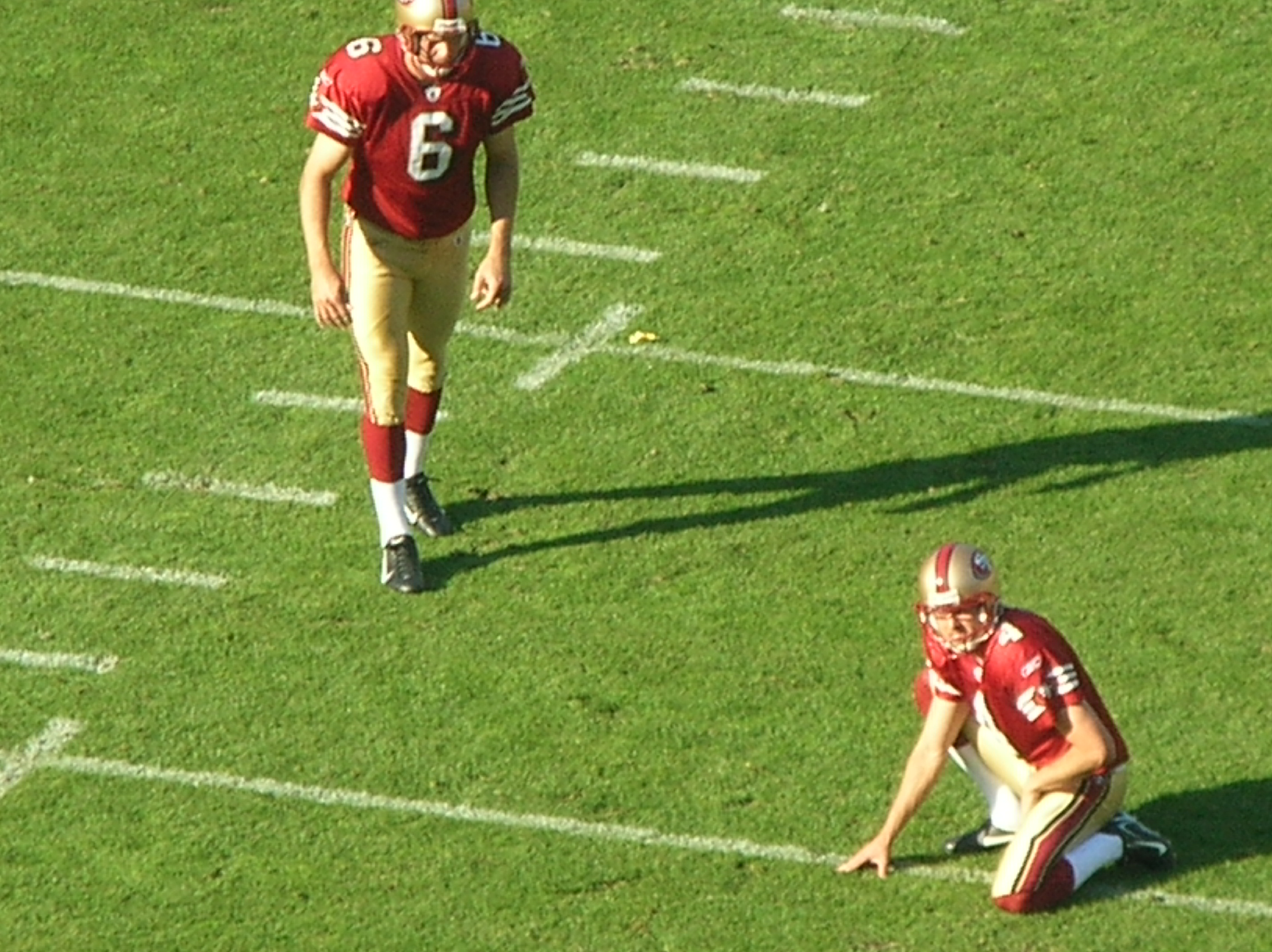
San Francisco 49ers kicker Joe Nedney prepares to kick an extra point with punter Lee as the holder, 2008.

After earning Pro Bowl and All-Pro honors in 2007, Lee once again put up outstanding numbers, in 2008, as he set a career-high and team record with his 47.8 gross average. He had a career long 82-yard punt against the New England Patriots on October 5.

==== 2009 season ====
In the 2009 season, Lee returned to his 2007 form, having a superb year and earning his second Pro Bowl selection.

==== 2010 season ====
Lee followed up his Pro Bowl season in 2009 with another stellar year for the 49ers, playing in all 16 games and averaging 46.2 yards per punt. The 2010 season also marked the first season a punter ran for more than 70 yards in a single game, as he completed 2 successful fake punt run attempts.

==== 2011 season ====
In 2011, Lee set a new NFL single-season record by averaging 44.0 net yards per punt, while his gross average of 50.9 yards was third best in league history. He was named First-team All-Pro by the Associated Press and was voted to his third Pro Bowl.

==== 2012 season ====
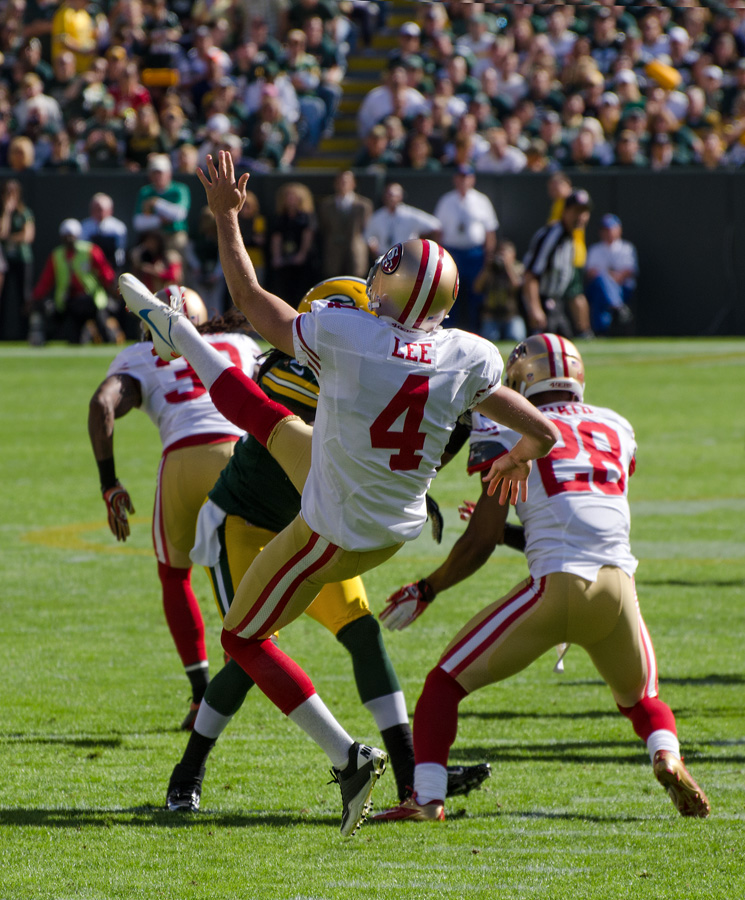
Lee in 2012

On May 25, 2012, Lee received a six-year $20.4 million contract extension with the 49ers that made him the third highest-paid punter in the league.

In the 2012 regular season, Lee had 67 punts with a 48.15 average. At the end of the 2012 season, Lee and the 49ers appeared in Super Bowl XLVII. In the game, he had three punts for 159 net yards (55.0 average) as the 49ers fell to the Baltimore Ravens by a score of 34–31.

==== 2013 season ====
In the 2013 season, Lee had 79 punts with a 48.15 average.

==== 2014 season ====
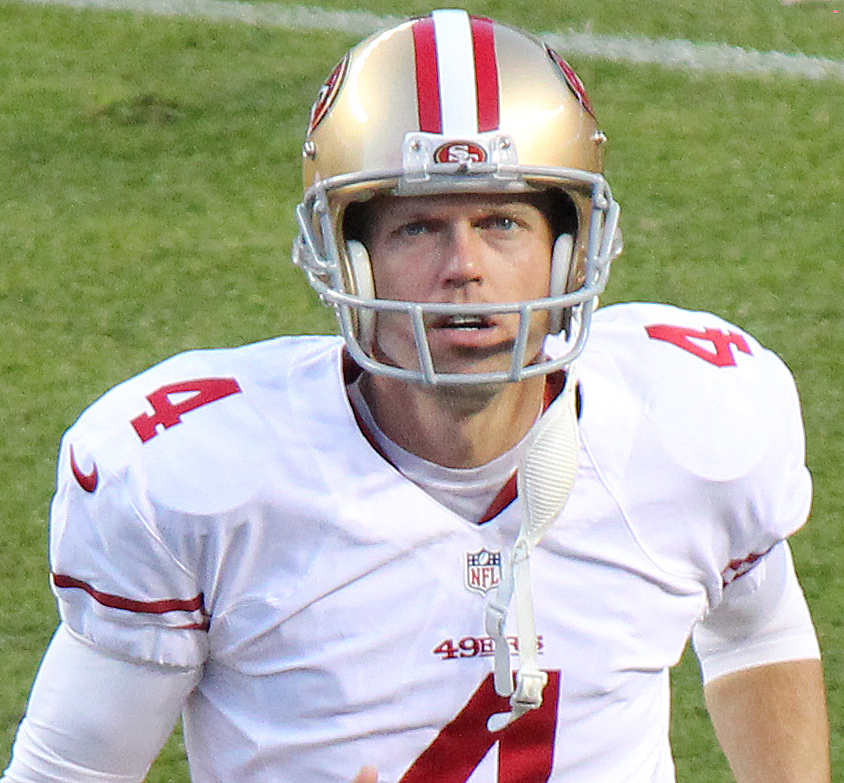
Lee in 2014

In the 2014 season, Lee had 72 punts with a 46.79 average.

=== Cleveland Browns ===
On June 6, 2015, Lee was traded to Cleveland Browns for a seventh-round pick in the 2017 NFL draft. This took place after the 49ers drafted punter Bradley Pinion. He announced he would wear #8 for the team in honor of his daughter Madelyn, who died in February 2015 at just eight days old. In the 2015 season, Lee had 70 punts with a 46.71 average.

=== Carolina Panthers ===
On August 29, 2016, Lee was traded from the Browns to the Carolina Panthers along with a 2017 seventh-round pick for a 2018 fourth-round pick and punter Kasey Redfern. Lee was placed on injured reserve on November 14, 2016, after pulling his hamstring.

On September 2, 2017, Lee was released by the Panthers.

=== Arizona Cardinals ===
==== 2017 season ====
On September 4, 2017, the Arizona Cardinals signed Lee to a two-year deal. In the 2017 season, he had 88 punts with a 47.26 average.

==== 2018 season ====
On June 14, 2018, Lee signed a two-year contract extension with the Cardinals through the 2020 season. In the 2018 season, he led with the league with 94 punts for 4,568 yards for a 48.6 average.

==== 2019 season ====
During Week 10 against the Tampa Bay Buccaneers, Lee converted on a 25-yard pass to Pharoh Cooper on a fake punt. In the 2019 season, Lee had 61 punts with a 47.75 average.

==== 2020 season ====
During Week 15 against the Philadelphia Eagles, Lee converted on a 26-yard pass to linebacker Ezekiel Turner on a fake punt. Lee finished the 2020 season with 58 punts for a 44.83 average.

==== 2021 season ====
Lee re-signed to a one-year contract with the Cardinals on March 22, 2021. In the 2021 season, he punted 51 times with a 49.04 average.

==== 2022 season ====
Lee signed another one-year contract on March 17, 2022. In the 2022 season, he punted 67 times with a 47.12 average.

== NFL career statistics ==
Legend
	Led the league
**Bold**	Career high

=== Regular season ===
Year	Team	GP	Punting							
Year	Team	GP	Punts	Yds	Lng	Avg	Net Avg	Blk	Ins20	RetY
2004	SF	16	96	3,990	81	41.6	35.3	0	25	445
2005	SF	16	**107**	4,447	58	41.6	36.3	**1**	15	471
2006	SF	16	81	3,625	66	44.8	36.8	0	22	462
2007	SF	16	105	**4,968**	74	47.3	41.0	0	**42**	402
2008	SF	16	66	3,155	**82**	47.8	39.0	**1**	13	364
2009	SF	16	99	4,711	64	47.6	41.0	0	30	495
2010	SF	16	91	4,203	64	46.2	38.2	0	34	483
2011	SF	16	78	3,970	68	**50.9**	**44.0**	**1**	28	315
2012	SF	16	67	3,226	66	48.1	43.2	0	36	249
2013	SF	16	79	3,804	62	48.2	41.7	0	27	330
2014	SF	16	72	3,369	71	46.8	39.6	**1**	28	336
2015	CLE	16	70	3,270	67	46.7	40.1	0	25	381
2016	CAR	9	36	1,769	76	49.1	40.4	0	18	236
2017	ARI	16	88	4,159	63	47.3	39.7	0	29	**506**
2018	ARI	16	94	4,568	64	48.6	42.6	0	32	420
2019	ARI	15	61	2,913	64	47.8	41.2	**1**	21	278
2020	ARI	16	58	2,600	61	44.8	39.6	0	21	201
2021	ARI	16	51	2,501	62	49.0	40.8	0	11	321
2022	ARI	**17**	67	3,157	65	47.1	40.3	**1**	18	340
Career		297	1,466	68,405	82	46.7	39.9	6	475	7,035

=== Postseason ===
Year	Team	GP	Punting				
Year	Team	GP	Punts	Yds	Avg	Lng	Blk
2011	SF	2	**18**	**851**	47.3	**63**	0
2012	SF	**3**	9	443	**49.2**	62	0
2013	SF	**3**	9	373	41.4	52	0
2021	ARI	1	5	241	48.2	54	0
Career		9	41	1,908	46.5	63	0

=== 49ers franchise records ===
- Most career punting yards: 43,468
- Most punting yards in a single season: 4,968 (2007)
