= Vantz Singletary =

American football player and coach (born 1965)

Biographical details
- Born: November 23, 1965 (age 60); Houston, Texas, U.S.
- Died: October 6, 2026
- Education: Kansas State University

Playing career
- 1985–1986: Blinn College
- 1987–1988: Kansas State
- Position: Linebacker

Coaching career (HC unless noted)
- 1992–1996: Trinity International (IL) (DC, DL, LB, WR)
- 1997–1998: Southern University (DL)
- 1999–2005: Hawaii (DL)
- 2006–2007: Chattanooga (DL)
- 2008: Buffalo (DL)
- 2009–2010: San Francisco 49ers (LB)
- 2011: Kansas (LB)
- 2012–2018: Liberty (Co-DC/DL/Pro Liaison)
- 2019: Memphis Express (AAF) (Senior Analyst & Special Asst. to HC)
- 2019–2020: Tennessee State (DE)
- 2021: Prairie View A&M (AHC/DE/STC)
- 2022: Trinity International (IL) (AHC/DC/LB)

Vantz J. Singletary (born November 23, 1965) is a former American football coach and player. He was the inside linebackers coach for the San Francisco 49ers from 2009 to 2010, under his uncle, head coach and Pro Football Hall of Fame linebacker Mike Singletary. He has coached at the University of Kansas, University at Buffalo, University of Tennessee at Chattanooga, University of Hawaii, Southern University, Tennessee State University, Prairie View A&M University, and Trinity International University.

== Personal life ==
Vantz Singletary is married to the former Shawndra Saulter and they have four daughters.
