= Moran Norris =

American football player (born 1978)

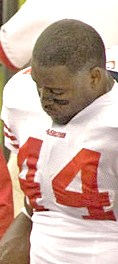
- Norris with the San Francisco 49ers in 2009

No. 33, 44, 40
- Position: Fullback

Personal information
- Born: June 16, 1978 (age 48); Houston, Texas, U.S.
- Listed height: 6 ft 1 in (1.85 m)
- Listed weight: 250 lb (113 kg)

Career information
- High school: Madison (Houston)
- College: Kansas
- NFL draft: 2001: 4th round, 125th overall pick

Career history
- New Orleans Saints (2001–2002); Houston Texans (2002–2005); San Francisco 49ers (2006–2007); Detroit Lions (2008); San Francisco 49ers (2009–2011); Houston Texans (2012)*
- * Offseason or practice squad member only

Awards and highlights
- Third-team All-Big 12 (2000)

Career NFL statistics
- Games played: 140
- Rushing attempts: 28
- Rushing yards: 67
- Rushing touchdowns: 1
- Receptions: 38
- Receiving yards: 198
- Receiving touchdowns: 3
- Stats at Pro Football Reference

Torrance Moran Norris (/ˈmɒrən/ MORR-ən; born June 16, 1978) is an American former professional football player who was a fullback in the National Football League (NFL). He was selected by the New Orleans Saints in the fourth round of the 2001 NFL draft. He played college football for the Kansas Jayhawks.

Norris has also played for the Houston Texans, Detroit Lions and San Francisco 49ers.

== Early life ==
Moran graduated from Madison High School in Houston, Texas in 1996.

== College career ==
Norris went on to play collegiate football for the University of Kansas.

== Professional career ==
=== New Orleans Saints ===
He was selected by the New Orleans Saints in the fourth round (115th overall) in the 2001 NFL draft. Norris played his entire season with the Saints before being waived on September 17, 2002.

=== Houston Texans (first stint) ===
A day after being waived by the Saints, Norris was claimed off waived by the Houston Texans on September 18, 2002. He was a member of the Texans through the 2005 season. In 2005, Norris played in all 16 games with five starts and had one reception for four yards and 12 special teams tackles.

=== San Francisco 49ers (first stint) ===
Norris was signed as a free agent by the 49ers in 2006. That season, he helped 49ers running back Frank Gore rush for 1,695 yards and earn a Pro Bowl selection. Norris caught two passes for touchdowns that season; one of those coming in the season finale against the Denver Broncos, helping to knock them out of the playoffs.

Norris was released by the 49ers during final cuts on August 30, 2008.

=== Detroit Lions ===
Norris was signed by the Detroit Lions on October 9, 2008, after running back Marcus Thomas was waived. Norris was released before the team's next game on October 12, 2008, when quarterback Drew Henson was promoted to the active roster. Norris was once again signed by the Lions on October 13, 2008, after safety Gerald Alexander was put on the injured reserve list.

=== San Francisco 49ers (second stint) ===
An unrestricted free agent in the 2009 offseason, Norris was re-signed by the San Francisco 49ers on February 27, 2009. The three-year, $5 million contract included a $1.5-million signing bonus.

=== Houston Texans (second stint) ===
Norris had a brief stint with the Texans during the 2012 preseason. He was signed on June 14, 2012, and was released on August 31.

== Moran Norris Foundation ==
The Moran Norris Foundation was started in 2005. Moran and his wife Tamara, both Houston natives created the foundation to help at-risk students achieve their goals.
