= Chicago Bears Stadium =

Proposed stadium in the United States

- Location: TBD (Chicago metropolitan area)
- Operator: Chicago Bears
- Roof: Skylight

Construction
- Opened: 2031 (planned)

Tenant
- Chicago Bears

Chicago Bears Stadium is the project name for a proposed American indoor stadium to house the Chicago Bears of the National Football League (NFL). It is yet to be determined when construction will begin, but it was originally expected to open by 2029. In 2025, the team began considering a location in Indiana after originally considering the former Arlington Park racetrack in Arlington Heights.

== Background ==
Upon their founding, the Decatur Staleys played at their games at Staley Field which was owned by the team parent company, the A. E. Staley Manufacturing Company. Although the Staley football team was popular in 1920, it struggled financially, partly due to Staley Field's 1,500 seating capacity. Fans were charged one dollar to attend games and company employees received a fifty percent discount, which was not economically feasible for the Staleys.

The Staley company sold the team to George Halas, who transferred the team to Chicago in 1921 and moved the games to Cubs Park (now Wrigley Field), which was owned by the Chicago Cubs of Major League Baseball (MLB). In 1922, the team was renamed the Chicago Bears in order to associate themselves with their landlords.

After the AFL–NFL merger following the 1970 season, the league issued a mandate dictating that teams must play in stadiums with a minimum capacity of 50,000 seats. In 1971, the Bears moved to their current home, Soldier Field, which is owned by the Chicago Park District. The move was supposed to be temporary, due to concerns including the stadium's capacity of 61,500 seats, which is the lowest in the NFL; exposure to the elements; and limited opportunities for the team to profit from the stadium. In the decades since the Bears' move to Soldier Field, there have been numerous unsuccessful proposals to renovate or rebuild Soldier Field, as well as build a new stadium in the city of Chicago or outside of it.

Soldier Field completed a major renovation in 2003 that rebuilt the interior of the historic stadium. The outer facade was preserved, but the site lost its National Historic Landmark status amid heavy criticism of its clashing architectural elements. The Chicago Bears' current lease at Soldier Field runs through 2033.

== Current stadium project ==
=== Purchase of Arlington Park ===
In September 2021, under former team president Ted Phillips, the Bears put a purchase agreement on the 326-acre plot of land in the village of Arlington Heights, Illinois and the Arlington Park properties. In September 2022, the Bears hosted an informational meeting to discuss the potential purchase and possible development of Arlington Park at John Hersey High School. The sale of the land in Arlington Heights was finalized on February 15, 2023, for $197.2 million, with plans on building a new $5 billion domed stadium on the land.

The Bears appointed a new president and CEO, Kevin Warren, who started in the role in April 2023 with the goal of helping to build the stadium in Arlington Heights Demolition of former Arlington Park began in May 2023, but disagreement over the property tax assessment prompted the Bears to explore alternative sites for its planned stadium.

=== Lakefront/Museum Campus proposal ===
In March 2024, Warren announced that the Bears would contribute $2 billion to building a domed stadium on the lakefront to replace Soldier Field. The plan also indicated that much of Soldier Field would be torn down to create the additional "green space". Soon after, the village of Arlington Heights offered a tax reduction in attempt to convince the team to continue building their stadium in the village. On April 24, 2024, the day before the 2024 NFL draft, the Bears revealed further plans for a $4.7 billion domed lakefront stadium development.

While Chicago Mayor Brandon Johnson supported the proposal, the office of Illinois Governor J. B. Pritzker stated in May 2024 that the plan was a "non-starter for the state," due to lacking "demonstrable and tangible benefit to the taxpayers of Illinois."

In September 2024, Friends of the Parks announced their opposition to the Bears' project and their intention to fight it. Executive director Gin Kilgore stated, "We'd like to say you never start with a lawsuit, but you don't take it off the table." In October 2024, Bears president Kevin Warren said he "hopes the Bears can break ground in 2025 on a lakefront stadium, which remains the priority over Arlington Heights", and that they're "exploring private equity as funding source".

=== Return to Arlington Heights ===
In November 2024, the team and the village of Arlington Heights reached a tentative agreement over the tax dispute. The Bears reported intentions to submit traffic and financial studies for Arlington Heights stadium site in March 2025. In September 2025, Warren sent a letter to Bears fans reiterating the team's commitment to building a stadium in Arlington Heights, "which will require zero state money for construction."

In November 2025, progress on the stadium was delayed due to not receiving state funds for $826 million in nearby public infrastructure and a freeze on the property tax assessment for the site.

=== Northwest Indiana ===
On December 17, 2025, Warren sent an open letter to Bears fans stating that while Arlington Park was "the only location in Cook County that meets the requirements for a world-class NFL stadium," the Bears would expand their search to other areas such as Northwest Indiana. In response, Governor Pritzker said, “Suggesting the Bears would move to Indiana is a startling slap in the face to all the beloved and loyal fans who have been rallying around the team during this strong season."

In February 2026, Indiana Governor Mike Braun signed Senate Bill 27 to create a Northwest Indiana stadium authority which would have the power to acquire and finance the construction of facilities and officially named Hammond as the site of the stadium.

The proposed stadium site near Wolf Lake in Hammond has a history of heavy industrialization and contamination with hazardous chemicals. A previous cleanup effort resulted in the construction of a golf course on top of "a mountain of slag" and capped with "bio-solids that are treated human waste." Nearby, there is a Superfund site at the former Federated Metals smelting facility, where the EPA has attempted partial cleanup of elevated levels of lead and arsenic. Hammond was also historically the home of the Hammond Pros, who played in the NFL from 1920 to 1926.

=== Illinois legislature ===
The Illinois legislature has introduced multiple bills intending to offer the Chicago Bears the tax certainty they want for the stadium project. In April 2026, HB 910, dubbed the "megaprojects bill," passed the Illinois House of Representatives. The bill would allow companies to freeze their property tax assessments for 40 years and negotiate payment-in-lieu-of-taxes with the local municipality. The Bears released a positive statement about the passage of the bill, but noted that "additional amendments are necessary to make the Arlington Heights site feasible for our stadium project."

On June 1, 2026, the Illinois Senate passed a bill that would allow municipalities to set up stadium authorities that could own and finance professional sports stadiums. The Bears would not have to pay property taxes on a facility owned by a public authority. However, the Illinois House adjourned before voting on the bill, and will not be in session again until the fall.

In the spring of 2026, the Bears publicly stated their only two location choices were Hammond, Indiana and Arlington Heights, Illinois, and told legislators that they had only had one routine meeting with the city of Chicago in April that centered on the team's current lease at Soldier Field. However, Crain's Chicago Business obtained records that showed the Bears had at least six meetings with the city of Chicago in April about the stadium project, with discussions ranging far beyond that topic.

On June 5, 2026, the Bears released a statement saying that the Chicago Bears Board of Directors "voted to advance our stadium development project in Hammond, Indiana." However, the statement says, "the exact site" is still "to be selected," and talks with Illinois lawmakers are likely to continue.

=== Bronzeville ===
In November 2024, the Bears stated that they also considered the site of the former Michael Reese Hospital in the Bronzeville neighborhood after progress on the waterfront site stalled. The site was originally rejected because it was considered too narrow and over an active rail line. In March 2025, Farpoint Development stated that they had a plan for a privately funded 75,000-seat domed stadium and additional parking and infrastructure investment. Demolition of the nearby Prairie Shores apartments would be considered to increase the stadium footprint.

=== Other locations ===
In 2026, the city of Portage, Indiana proposed Halas Harbor, a 300-acre site for a new stadium and entertainment district on the Lake Michigan waterfront that would be rent-free and privately funded.

In February 2026, it was reported that several senators from Iowa were sponsoring a bill called Senate File 2252 which would provide financial incentives for an NFL team to build a stadium in the state if the stadium costs $1 billion or more, with the hopes that they could lure the Chicago Bears. In October 2026, a plan was unveiled to build the Bears new stadium at the site of Rate Field, the home of the Chicago White Sox should they move out of the stadium.

== Earlier proposed stadium locations ==
=== Comiskey Park ===
In 1971, the White Sox offered to have the Bears play in Comiskey Park, which was their home ballpark, as well as the former home of the NFL's Chicago Cardinals, but Halas declined out of respect for the Cubs. In 1977, the Bears revealed they had contact with then-White Sox owner Bill Veeck about the use of the stadium as a temporary solution, as a result of the deteriorating state of Soldier Field. In 1980, the Chicago Tribune revealed that the Bears were considering playing their 1980 regular season games at the stadium if they couldn't sign a lease extension with the Chicago Park District, who owns Soldier Field. In 1998, then-Chicago mayor Richard M. Daley proposed that the Bears share a retrofitted New Comiskey Park with the White Sox.

=== Arlington Heights ===
In 1975, George Halas Sr. and George Halas Jr. announced plans to build a 76,000-80,000 seat stadium in Arlington Heights on the grounds of Arlington Park, sign a 35-year lease, and have the Bears begin playing there in 1977. The project would have cost $25–30 million, funded by revenue bonds issued by the village. The project did not move forward due to concerns about its financing.

In the 1980s and 1990s, there were some mentions of a continuing relationship between the Bears and the owner of Arlington Park. Often, Michael McCaskey would mention that a stadium deal in Arlington Heights was still possible when he was facing difficulties in negotiating with the city of Chicago. For example, in 1990, he stated that that the Bears had not ruled out their proposals for stadiums in suburbs including Arlington Heights and Waukegan amid stalled legislation around the proposed expansion of McCormick Place in 1990.

=== Northwestern University ===
In 1970, the Big Ten waived its ban on professional teams using its stadiums for a single day and allowed the Bears played their first home game of the 1970 season at Dyche Stadium (later renamed Ryan Field) at Northwestern University. In 1971, before deciding to move to Soldier Field, the Bears signed a five-year agreement to play at Dyche Field, but it was ultimately blocked by the Big Ten. After the team's plan to move to Arlington Heights in 1977 fell through, the team re-examined the option to play at Northwestern University's Dyche Stadium. However, Evanston zoning ordinances continued to block the Bears from playing there.

=== Notre Dame Stadium ===
In 1978, upset over the potential loss of seating due to renovations at Soldier Field, George Halas Jr. proposed that the Bears move to Notre Dame Stadium in South Bend, Indiana, but he also said, "We don't even know whether a place like Notre Dame would let us in". In July 1980, the Bears approached the university officials with a request to play two exhibition games and eight regular season games for the upcoming season, but the team later signed a new 20-year lease agreement to stay in Soldier Field.

=== Waukegan ===
In 1987, after the Bears signed a memorandum to begin developing a site on Chicago's West Side, they also expressed interest in building a stadium in suburban Waukegan, Illinois. In 1990, Bears President Michael McCaskey said that a proposal to build a stadium in Waukegan was still on the table.

=== West Side Stadium ===
From 1986 to 1987, then-Chicago Mayor Harold Washington worked with the Bears on a number of proposals for stadiums. One option was for a stadium south of the Loop at at Roosevelt Road and the South Branch of the Chicago River, which was rejected by the Bears for being too costly. Then, Washington began exploring the possibility of building directly on the lakefront on publicly owned land directly south of Soldier Field.

In 1987, the Bears signed a "Memorandum of Mutual Understanding" with the city to begin planning for a stadium on the West Side, funded by the addition of new luxury skyboxes at Soldier Field. The project, which was intended to be privately funded, was thwarted by interest rates and the expiration of an exception to a ban on using tax-exempt bonds to build sports stadiums in 1990.

=== McCormick Place ("McDome") ===
In early 1990, then-Illinois governor James R. Thompson and then-Chicago Mayor Richard M. Daley ordered the planning of a domed stadium (nicknamed the "McDome") as part of a major expansion of the McCormick Place convention center, just south of the Loop on Chicago's lakefront. Though Michael McCaskey said, "we're not wildly enthusiastic about it," Thompson and Daley presented the dome as "the team's last chance at a taxpayer-subsidized stadium." By late 1990, state legislators had not voted on the project and it did not move forward.

=== DuPage County ===
As plans for the dome at McCormick place stalled in the Illinois state legislature in 1991, DuPage County officials tried to pursue the Bears to be principal tenants on vacant DuPage Airport property.

In 1995, the Bears announced that they were planning to build a new $285 million stadium. Two or three potential locations were in DuPage County: the Chicago-owned westernmost portion of O'Hare International Airport, and one or two additional sites adjacent to Highway 88. The DuPage County sites were dismissed as possibilities within months due to taxpayers' lack of support for the project.

=== Hoffman Estates ===
In 1995, the Bears announced they had acquired an option to purchase 200 acres in Hoffman Estates, Illinois, as one of four potential locations for its new $285 million, 74,000-seat stadium. At the time it was believed that the Hoffman Estates location was the favorite. By early 1996, the Bears' hopes for a suburban site were dashed by a lack of funding and they once again turned to negotiating with the city of Chicago.

=== Northwest Indiana ===
In 1995, a business group called Northwest Indiana/Chicagoland Entertainment Inc. tried to lure the Bears with a plan for a $205 million, 75,000-seat open air stadium in Gary, Indiana, as part of a $482 million plan redevelopment project west of the Gary Regional Airport called "Planet Park." However, the plan was rejected by the Lake County Council.

=== Elk Grove Village ===
In 1998 the Bears signed a letter of intent that gave them 18 months to decide whether to pursue a new $200 million to $300 million stadium in Elk Grove Village, with state officials saying "they are not willing to make any significant contributions to build a suburban home for the Bears".
