= Ted Phillips =

American football executive (born 1957)

Personal information
- Born: June 27, 1957 (age 69); Oneida, New York, U.S.

Career information
- College: University of Notre Dame (BBA); Northwestern University (MBA)

Career history
- Chicago Bears (1983–1987) Controller; Chicago Bears (1988–1992) Director of finance; Chicago Bears (1993–1998) Vice president of operations; Chicago Bears (1999–2022) President and chief executive officer

Awards and highlights
- Super Bowl champion (XX)

Ted Phillips (born June 27, 1957) is an American businessman and the former president and CEO of the National Football League's Chicago Bears. He was only the fourth president of the 100-year-old organization at the time of his hiring, with his predecessors being Michael McCaskey, George Halas Jr., and "Papa Bear" George Halas.

== Early life and family ==
Phillips was born in Oneida, New York and was raised in Nashua, New Hampshire. He graduated from The University of Notre Dame with an undergraduate degree in business and accounting. He worked for the accounting and consulting firm Ernst and Whinney, now known as Ernst & Young, as an auditor and tax accountant from 1979 to 1983. Phillips is the father of three sons: Matthew, Max, and Frank.

== Chicago Bears ==
Phillips began his career with the organization on September 28, 1983, as the team's controller. In 1988, he was promoted to the director of finance and became responsible for the club's business operations and negotiating all player contracts. While working with the Chicago Bears, he earned his master's degree in marketing and management from the Kellogg Graduate School at Northwestern University in 1989. In 1993, he was promoted to vice president of operations .

=== President & CEO ===
On February 10, 1999, Phillips was named the chief executive officer and president of the Chicago Bears, making him only the fourth president in team history, and the first who was not a member of the Halas-McCaskey family. He made many changes to the organization. In the offseason of 2001, Phillips hired Jerry Angelo as the general manager of the team and later extended his contract in 2003 and 2006 to create stability in the front office. He also made the decision to move the Bears' summer training camp to Olivet Nazarene University in Bourbonnais, Illinois.

In 2009, Phillips decided to freeze ticket prices in light of the country's economic situation. As of 2011, the team's value was estimated at $1.09 billion. Phillips voted against the new NFL rule to move up kickoffs, which had been held at the 30 yard line, to the 35-yard line, considering special teams have been a strong point for the Bears, but the rule passed.

In the 24 years Phillips acted as team president, the Bears made the playoffs six times. The Bears formally changed Phillips' responsibilities following the 2021 season, which saw the team fire head coach Matt Nagy and general manager Ryan Pace after a 6–11 finish. Phillips would no longer oversee the team's general manager, who would instead report directly to chairman George McCaskey. On September 2, 2022, Phillips announced he would retire from his role after the 2022 NFL season. The Bears announced Kevin Warren would succeed Phillips as president following the 2022 NFL season.
