= Jerry Vainisi =

American football executive (1941 – 2022)

- Born: October 7, 1941; Chicago, Illinois, U.S.
- Died: October 4, 2022 (aged 80); Oak Park, Illinois, U.S.
- Education: Georgetown University; Chicago-Kent College of Law
- Occupations: General manager/Vice president; Owner; Chairman/CEO
- Organizations: Chicago Bears; Detroit Lions; World League of American Football
- Predecessor: Jim Finks (Bears GM)
- Relatives: Jack Vainisi (brother)

Jerry Vainisi (October 7, 1941 – October 4, 2022) was an American football executive and businessman. He served as the general manager and executive vice president of the Chicago Bears of the National Football League (NFL) when they won Super Bowl XX. He also worked for the NFL's Detroit Lions, the World League of American Football, and in private business.

== Early life ==
Vainisi was the youngest of four children born to Anthony and Marie (Delisi) Vainisi in Chicago, Illinois. His oldest brother was Jack Vainisi.

Vainisi graduated from Campion High School in Prairie du Chien, Wisconsin, in 1959. He earned degrees from Georgetown University and Chicago–Kent College of Law.

== Career ==
Vainisi started his career with Arthur Andersen as an accountant before George Halas Jr. of the National Football League's (NFL) Chicago Bears, a friend of Vainisi's brother, hired him in 1972. He was the treasurer of the Chicago Bears from 1972 to 1982 before replacing Jim Finks as a general manager.

On August 24, 1983, Vainisi replaced Jim Finks as the general manager of the Bears, and was general manager for the Bears for their only Super Bowl win in 1985 when the Bears defeated the New England Patriots in Super Bowl XX. He was one of the people responsible for the removal of the Bears cheerleading squad Chicago Honey Bears in 1985, saying that the squad might be replaced by a high school band, despite not having done so. His close relationship with then-head coach Mike Ditka factored in his firing by Bears president Michael McCaskey on January 15, 1987. The rift stemmed from Vainisi and Ditka persuading McCaskey to acquire Doug Flutie, who was the starting quarterback in the Bears' 27–13 divisional playoff loss to the Washington Redskins at Soldier Field on January 3. The Bears dismissed Vainisi twelve days after the loss. He was the last Bears general manager until Jerry Angelo took over in 2001.

In 1987, Vainisi became the vice president of player personnel for the Detroit Lions. He drafted Hall of Fame running back Barry Sanders in the 1989 NFL draft. Vainisi left the Lions in 1990 to create and head the football operations of the World League of American Football (later named NFL Europe). In 1995, Vainisi retired from professional football and joined the Chicago law firm Hinshaw & Culbertson, heading the sports and entertainment division. He worked as a sports agent through Hinshaw & Culbertson and bought Forest Park National Bank.

In 2010, he was inducted into the Chicagoland Sports Hall of Fame.

== Personal life ==
Vainisi died at age 80 on October 4, 2022, in Oak Park, Illinois.
