= Virginia Halas McCaskey =

American football executive (1923–2025)

- George Halas (her father), and McCaskey in 1963
- Born: Virginia Marion Halas; January 5, 1923; Chicago, Illinois, U.S.
- Died: February 6, 2025 (aged 102); Des Plaines, Illinois, U.S.
- Education: Drexel University
- Spouse: Ed McCaskey (m. 1943; died 2003)
- Children: 11, including Michael and George McCaskey
- Parents: George Halas (father); Minnie Bushing Halas (mother)
- Relatives: George Halas Jr. (brother)
- Football career

Chicago Bears
- Title: Principal owner

Career history
- Chicago Bears (1983–2024) Principal owner/secretary

Awards and highlights
- Super Bowl champion (XX)

Virginia Halas McCaskey (née Virginia Marion Halas; January 5, 1923 – February 6, 2025) was an American football executive who was the principal owner of the Chicago Bears of the National Football League (NFL) from 1983 until her death in 2025. She was the daughter of team founder George Halas and inherited ownership upon his death in 1983. Under her stewardship, the team won Super Bowl XX in 1986.

== Early life ==
She was the eldest child of Bears founder and owner George Halas and Minnie Bushing Halas. Virginia attended Drexel University, majoring in business management with the aspiration of serving as her father's secretary. She was an active member of the local Pi Sigma Gamma sorority, the Newman Club, the Panhellenic Council, and the YWCA.

Her first recollection of attending a Bears game was at the age of two years old, traveling with her father on a barnstorming tour starring Bears back Red Grange. She attended her first NFL Championship game, the 1932 NFL Playoff Game, the first indoor NFL game, at age 8. and witnessed the Bears' victory in the 1940 NFL Championship Game.

== Career ==
Officially, she was the secretary of the Bears franchise, as well as a member of the team's board of directors. However, she was empowered to vote the shares of her children and grandchildren as well as her own. Between them, McCaskey and other Halas heirs owned 80% of the Bears. The franchise has been in the hands of the Halas-McCaskey family since George Halas acquired the then-Decatur Staleys from A. E. Staley and moved the team to Chicago in 1921, renaming the team the Bears the following year. The Bears have been owned by the same family for longer than any other family has owned an NFL team.

George Halas had initially intended for Virginia's younger brother George "Mugs" Halas Jr. to inherit the team, and passed the team presidency to him in 1963. However, Mugs died suddenly of a heart attack in 1979. Thus, it was Virginia who inherited the Bears when her father died four years later.

During her tenure as owner, the Bears won Super Bowl XX in 1986, two seasons after "Papa Bear's" death. It was part of a run of five consecutive NFC Central titles from 1984 to 1988. In 1986, she disbanded the team's cheerleading squad, the "Honey Bears", after ten years, arguing that their field performances were "sexist and degrading to women".

The team struggled in the 1990s, and since 1999 she had been a very hands-off owner. Her son Michael McCaskey was team president from 1983 to 1999, when Virginia fired him, though he remained as chairman of the board until May 6, 2011, when his brother George assumed the position. George McCaskey had been the Bears ticket office director since 1991. The team president currently has operational control; when Ted Phillips assumed the post in 1999, it marked the first time in the NFL portion of franchise history that a Halas or McCaskey had not held that title, and this has continued under current president/CEO Kevin Warren, who succeeded Philips on January 12, 2023.

Halas' husband, Ed McCaskey, was previously the chairman and treasurer of the Bears. Although McCaskey never had any official share of ownership, he acted as co-owner alongside his wife before his death in 2003.

On January 21, 2007, she accepted the NFC Championship trophy, which bears her father's name. She called it "her happiest day so far", after the Bears had beaten the New Orleans Saints to earn a trip to Super Bowl XLI.

McCaskey was one of ten female NFL owners in 2022, including Sheila Ford Hamp (Detroit Lions), Amy Adams Strunk (Tennessee Titans), Kim Pegula (Buffalo Bills), Carol Davis (Las Vegas Raiders), Denise DeBartolo York (San Francisco 49ers), Gayle Benson (New Orleans Saints), Janice McNair (Houston Texans), Jody Allen (Seattle Seahawks), and Dee Haslam (Cleveland Browns).

After the death of Buffalo Bills owner Ralph Wilson in March 2014, she became the oldest owner in the NFL and in all major league sports in the United States.

After the death of Arizona Cardinals owner Bill Bidwill in October 2019, McCaskey became the longest-tenured owner in the NFL.

In 2023, she was named as a semifinalist for the Pro Football Hall of Fame. The Pro Football Hall of Fame also tried to honor her with the Ralph Hay Pioneer Award, given to an individual who has made significant and innovative contributions to professional football, but she declined, saying "she did not feel qualified".

== Personal life and death ==
McCaskey was known for being "proudly private" pertaining to the team her father built, rarely discussing the business aspect of her life. She married Ed McCaskey in 1943, they had 11 children and 21 grandchildren, 40 great-grandchildren, and 4 great-great-grandchildren. McCaskey was a Catholic and considered "faith, family, and football" indivisible in her life.

McCaskey turned 100 on January 5, 2023. She died on February 6, 2025. She was buried beside her husband at All Saints Cemetery in Des Plaines, Illinois.
