= Jack Vainisi =

American football scout

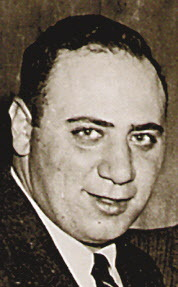
- Born: August 27, 1927; Chicago, Illinois, U.S.
- Died: November 27, 1960 (aged 33); Green Bay, Wisconsin, U.S.
- Occupations: Scout and personnel director
- Known for: Scout for the Green Bay Packers
- Children: 3
- Relatives: Jerry Vainisi (Brother)

Jack Vainisi (August 27, 1927 – November 27, 1960) was an American scout and personnel director for the Green Bay Packers from 1950 to 1960. At the age of 23, he was hired by Packers head coach Gene Ronzani to lead the team's player personnel department. In a time when most professional football teams relied on the media for information on college players, Vainisi enlisted college coaches to provide scouting reports on not only their own players, but also opposition players. During his time in charge of player personnel, the Packers drafted or acquired eight future Pro Football Hall of Fame players. Vainisi also was instrumental in attracting Vince Lombardi to the vacant head coaching job in Green Bay in 1959. Vainisi did not live to see the success of the teams he helped assemble though, as he died from a heart attack in 1960 at the age of 33.

== Early life ==
Vainisi was born in Chicago, Illinois, on August 27, 1927, to Anthony and Marie Vainisi. The Vainisi family, who lived on the North Side of Chicago, were strong supporters of the Chicago Bears. They ran a deli near Wrigley Field, which at the time was the home of the Bears, that attracted many players. Jack also attended grammar school with George Halas Jr., the son of Bears' coach George Halas. The family was so ingrained in the Bears organization that a group of players came over to the Vainisi house every year for a home-cooked Italian meal by Marie. In high school, Vainisi was an accomplished lineman on the football team and was offered an athletic scholarship to Notre Dame.

Vainisi played for the Notre Dame football team for one year. After his freshman year and near the end of World War II, he was drafted into the Army and sent to Japan during the post-war occupation. In Japan, he served in General Douglas MacArthur's headquarters and played on a football team made up of service members. He became ill while in Japan, and after returning to America, was diagnosed with rheumatic fever. This condition caused permanent damage to his heart and precluded him from playing organized sports for the rest of his life. He attained the rank of sergeant, but after his military service, he returned to Notre Dame to complete his degree. He graduated in 1950 at the age of 23.

== Green Bay Packers ==
With some help from his family connections with the Chicago Bears, Vainisi was able to get a job with the Green Bay Packers shortly after graduating from Notre Dame. The Packers' new coach, Gene Ronzani, had played for the Bears and dined at the Vainisi's, while Ronzani's assistant Hugh Devore coached Vainisi at Notre Dame. Vainisi was enthusiastic in his new role as a scout; professional scouting at the time was still in its infancy. Most team owners or head coaches would make player personnel decisions and would rely heavily on the media for scouting reports. Vainisi quickly developed a large network of college coaches that would provide him scouting reports on football players. By the end of his career, he had reports on over 4,000 players that filled 18 notebooks, all of which were cross-referenced. For most of his career, Vainisi was the only professional scout the Packers had on staff. He became well known around the National Football League (NFL) and respected for his knowledge, commitment, and scouting abilities.

Although the Packers' general manager retained the ultimate authority to draft and acquire players, Vainisi's reports and opinions were almost always followed. Over his ten-year career, Vainisi scouted and recommended drafting or acquiring eight future Pro Football Hall of Famers. The Packers 1958 NFL draft class is considered one of the best in history, as it included three Hall of Famers (Jim Taylor, Ray Nitschke, and Jerry Kramer) and one all-pro (Dan Currie). Vainisi convinced the Packers to select future Hall of Famer Paul Hornung with the first pick of the 1957 NFL draft and drafted Hall of Famers Jim Ringo, Bart Starr and Forrest Gregg. Vainisi also signed Willie Wood as a free agent in 1960. By the end of 1961, when the Packers won their first NFL Championship since 1944, 17 of the 22 offensive and defensive starters were acquired in some way by Vainisi.

Vainisi's greatest contribution to the Packers was his behind-the-scenes work in the hiring of Vince Lombardi in 1959. Vainisi lobbied on Lombardi's behalf to team president Dominic Olejniczak and the board of directors of Green Bay Packers, Inc. He also warned Lombardi to demand full control as coach and general manager to avoid interference by the directors in football decisions. During his interview, Lombardi stated to the board that he would not have considered Green Bay if it was not for Vainisi. With Lombardi at the helm, the Packers would go on to win five championships in seven years and over 100 games in the 1960s.

== Personal life ==
Vainisi married Jacqueline McGinnis in 1952. Jacqueline and Jack had three children: Valeria, Theresa, and Jack Anthony. In 1960, Vainisi suffered a massive heart attack and died at his home in Green Bay. Jacqueline was pregnant with their son at the time; Jack Anthony was delivered stillborn in January 1961, just a few months after his father died. Jacqueline died in 2002 at the age of 75.

Jack's brother, Jerry Vainisi, served as a ball boy for the Packers throughout his youth. Jerry went on to work for the Chicago Bears for 15 years, serving on the board of directors and becoming the general manager from 1983 to 1986. He helped lead the Bears to a victory in Super Bowl XX in 1985.

== Legacy ==
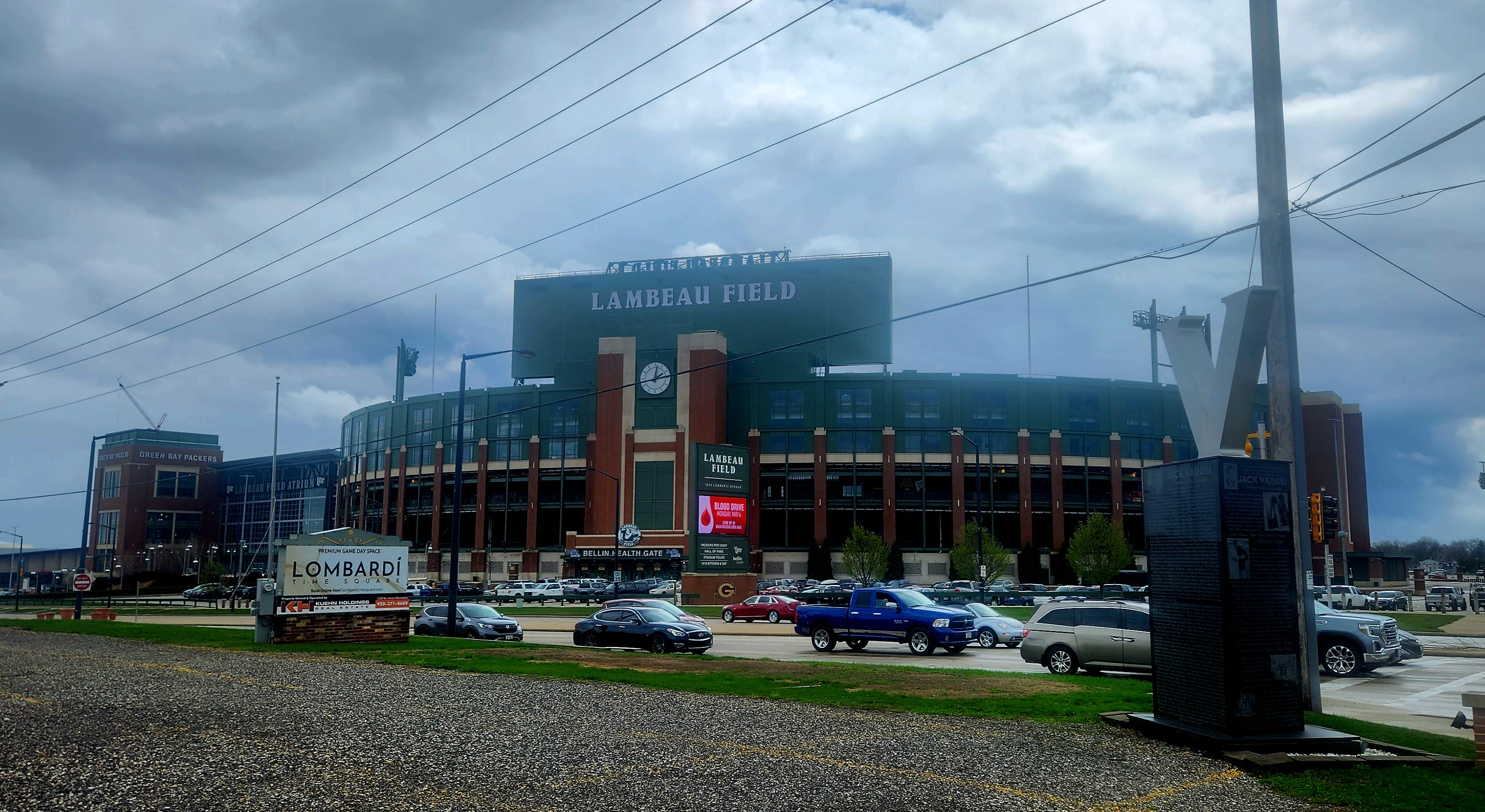
A view of Lambeau Field from Lombardi Avenue with a monument to Vainisi on the right in the foreground.

For all of his contributions to the successful Packers teams of the 1960s, Vainisi is not as well remembered as Lombardi or the players he brought to the team, although at the time he was widely respected in the NFL. The newness of professional scouting in the 1960s and his relatively short life contributed to his diminished legacy. Even so, Vainisi's contributions to the Packers were significant, and he has been recognized throughout the years for his impact. Not only did Vainisi acquire eight future Pro Football Hall of Famers and many more core players, he was the primary reason that Lombardi took the head coaching job in Green Bay in 1959. Both the players and the new coach would go on to win five NFL championships, including three straight from 1965 to 1967, and the first two Super Bowls. This success helped to resurrect an organization that had not had a winning season in 11 straight seasons during the 1940s and 1950s. In 1982, Vainisi was inducted into the Green Bay Packers Hall of Fame in recognition for his contributions as a scout. In 2015, the Packers erected a monument honoring his legacy at the entrance to the Titletown District, adjacent to Lambeau Field.
