= All Saints Cemetery (Des Plaines, Illinois) =

Cemetery in Des Plaines, Illinois

All Saints Catholic Cemetery & Mausoleum
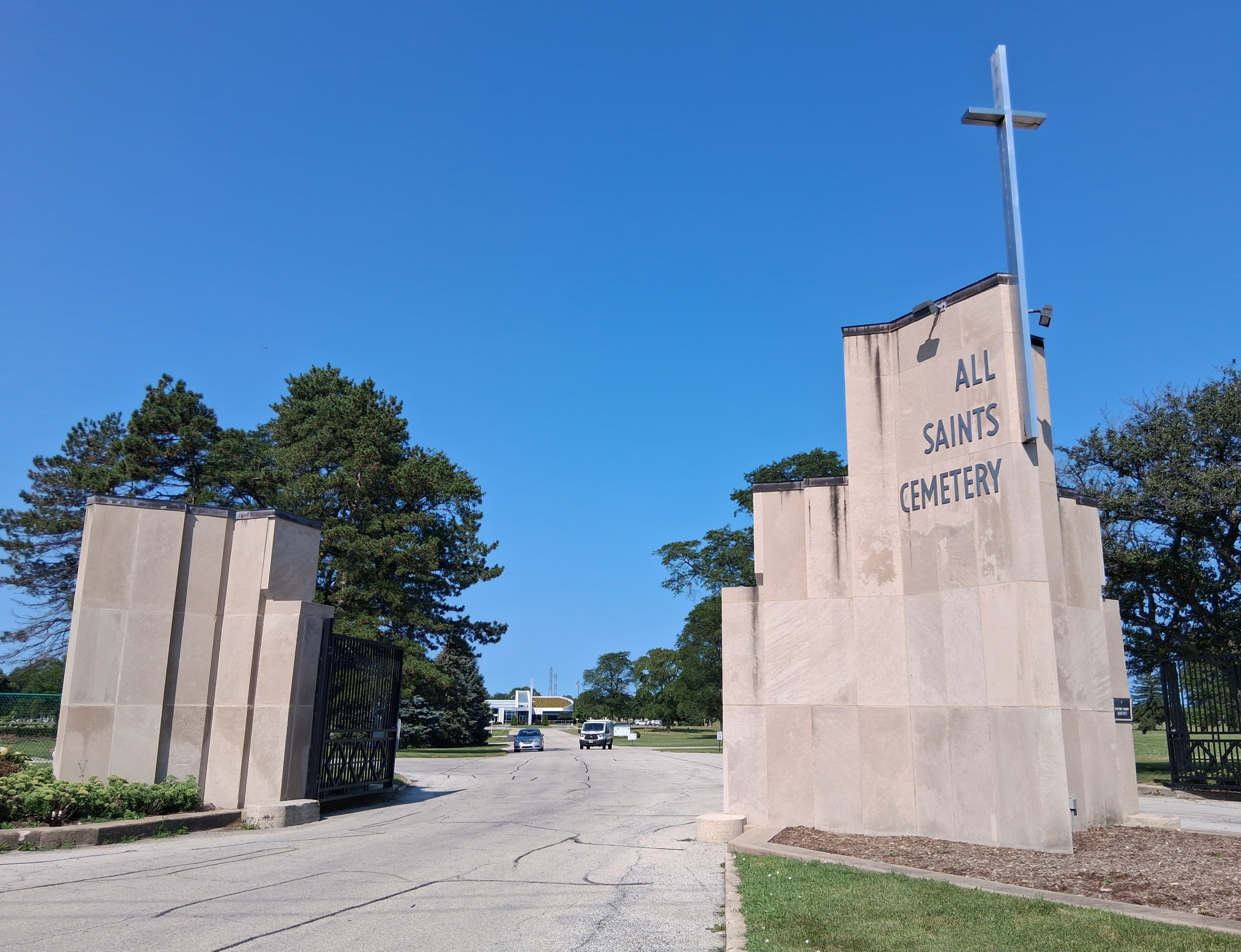
- The front gates of All Saints Cemetery
- Interactive map of All Saints Catholic Cemetery & Mausoleum

Details
- Established: 1923
- Location: Des Plaines, Illinois
- Country: United States
- Coordinates: 42°03′44″N 87°53′35″W
- Type: Catholic
- Website: Official website
- Find a Grave: All Saints Catholic Cemetery & Mausoleum

All Saints Cemetery is a cemetery of the Roman Catholic Archdiocese of Chicago, and is located at 700 North River Road, in Des Plaines, Illinois.

The original 1923 East cemetery was expanded in 1954 to include All Saints West. The cemetery includes a three-story community mausoleum containing space for thousands of above-ground interments.

== Notable burials ==
- Michael R. Blanchfield – (January 4, 1950 – July 3, 1969) Medal of Honor for his actions in the Vietnam War
- James Bowler – (February 5, 1875 – July 18, 1957) 3-term congressman from Illinois, the second oldest person to win his first election to Congress, at age 78, after William Lewis of Kentucky
- Charles A. Boyle – (August 13, 1907 – November 4, 1959)
- Harry Caray – (March 1, 1914 – February 18, 1998)
- Paul Christman – (March 5, 1918 – March 2, 1970)
- George "Moose" Connor – (January 21, 1925 – March 31, 2003)
- Henry Darger – (c. April 12, 1892 – April 13, 1973)
- Albert "Cozy" Dolan – (December 23, 1889 – December 10, 1958)
- John "Paddy" Driscoll – (January 11, 1895 – June 29, 1968)
- Matthew Eappen – (died February 9, 1997, age 8 months)
- Edward Rowan Finnegan – (June 5, 1905 – February 2, 1971)
- Lew Fonseca – (January 21, 1899 – November 26, 1989)
- Francis Cardinal George, O.M.I. – (January 16, 1937 – April 17, 2015)
- John J. Gorman – (June 2, 1883 – February 24, 1949)
- Carl Grubert – (September 11, 1911 – September 26, 1979)
- George Halas, Jr. – (September 4, 1925 – December 16, 1979)
- Charlie Hallstrom – (January 22, 1863 – May 6, 1949)
- Gabby Hartnett – (December 20, 1900 – December 20, 1972)
- James T. Igoe – (October 23, 1883 – December 2, 1971)
- Michael L. Igoe – (April 16, 1885 – August 21, 1967)
- John J. Kelly – (June 24, 1898 – November 20, 1957)
- Freddie Lindstrom – (November 21, 1905 – October 4, 1981)
- Phil Masi – (January 6, 1916 – March 29, 1990)
- Ed McCaskey – (April 27, 1919 – April 8, 2003)
- Virginia Halas McCaskey – (January 5, 1923 – February 6, 2025)
- James T. McDermott – (February 13, 1872 – February 7, 1938)
- Ray Meyer – (December 18, 1913 – March 17, 2006)
- Morgan F. Murphy – (April 16, 1932 – March 4, 2016)
- Thomas L. Owens – (December 21, 1897 – June 7, 1948)
- Robert Piest – (March 16, 1963 – December 11, 1978)
- Robert Edward Ringling – (August 16, 1897 – January 3, 1950)
- Annette Rogers – (October 22, 1913 – November 8, 2006)
- Henry Schmitz – (December 26, 1871 – April 17, 1939)
- Sherman J. Sexton – (September 12, 1892 – March 13, 1956)
- Owen Patrick Smith – (July 12, 1867 – January 15, 1927)
- Victims of American Airlines Flight 191 (1979)

== Gallery ==
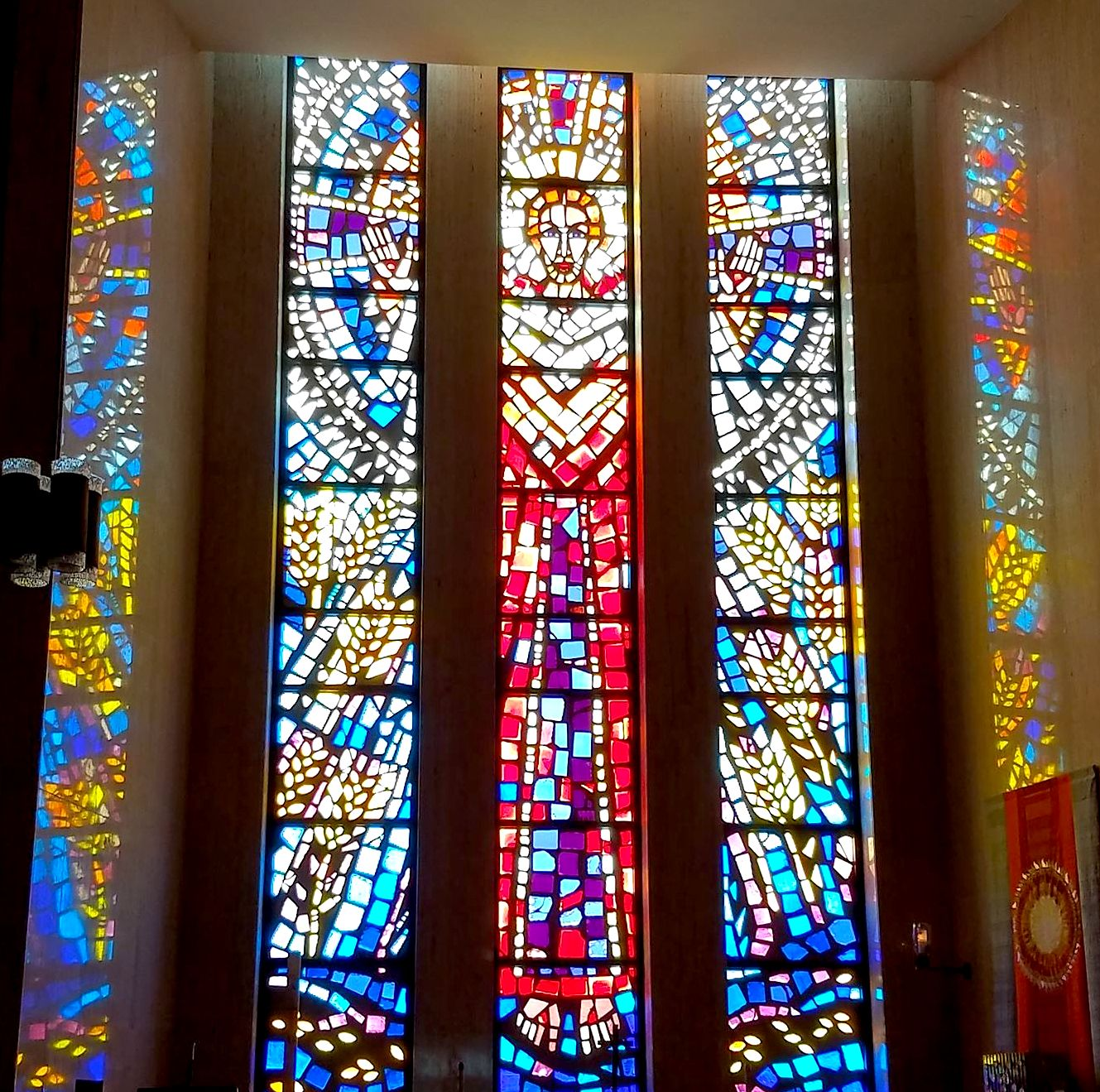
Chapel stained glass showing the Resurrection of Jesus, All Saints Cemetery Community Mausoleum

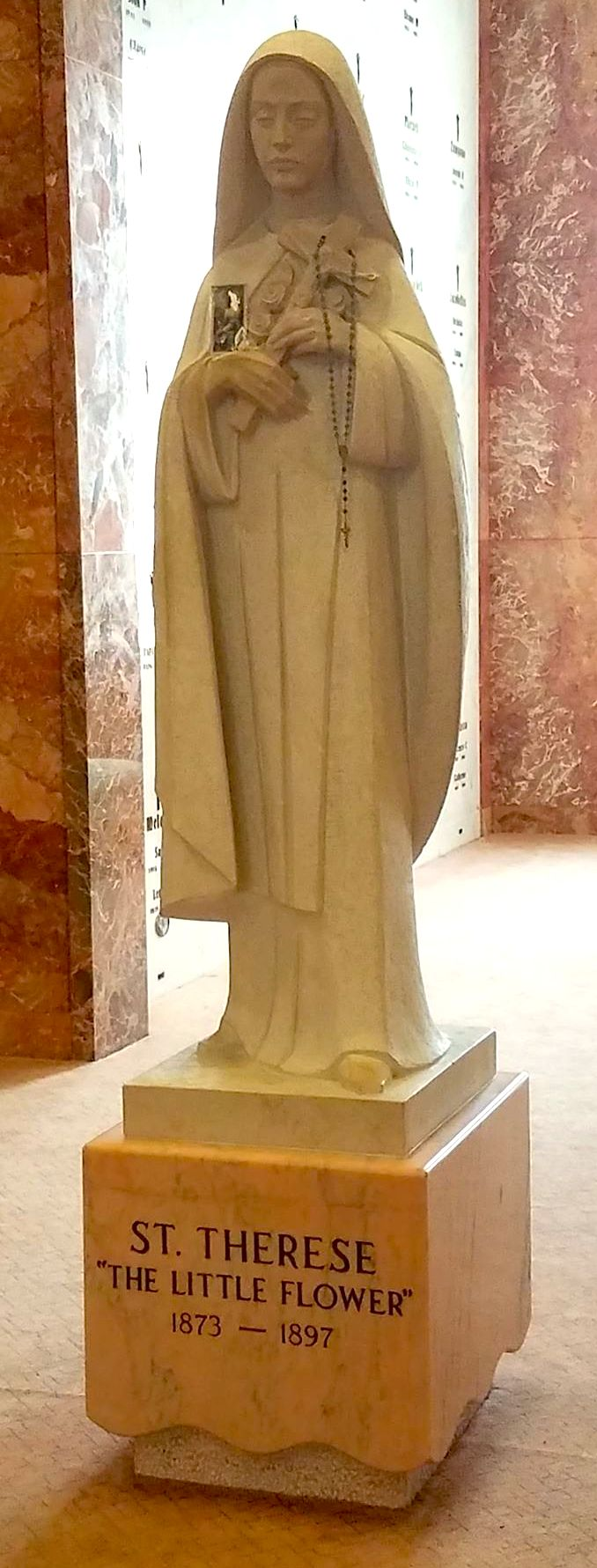
Thérèse of Lisieux, Community Mausoleum of All Saints Cemetery

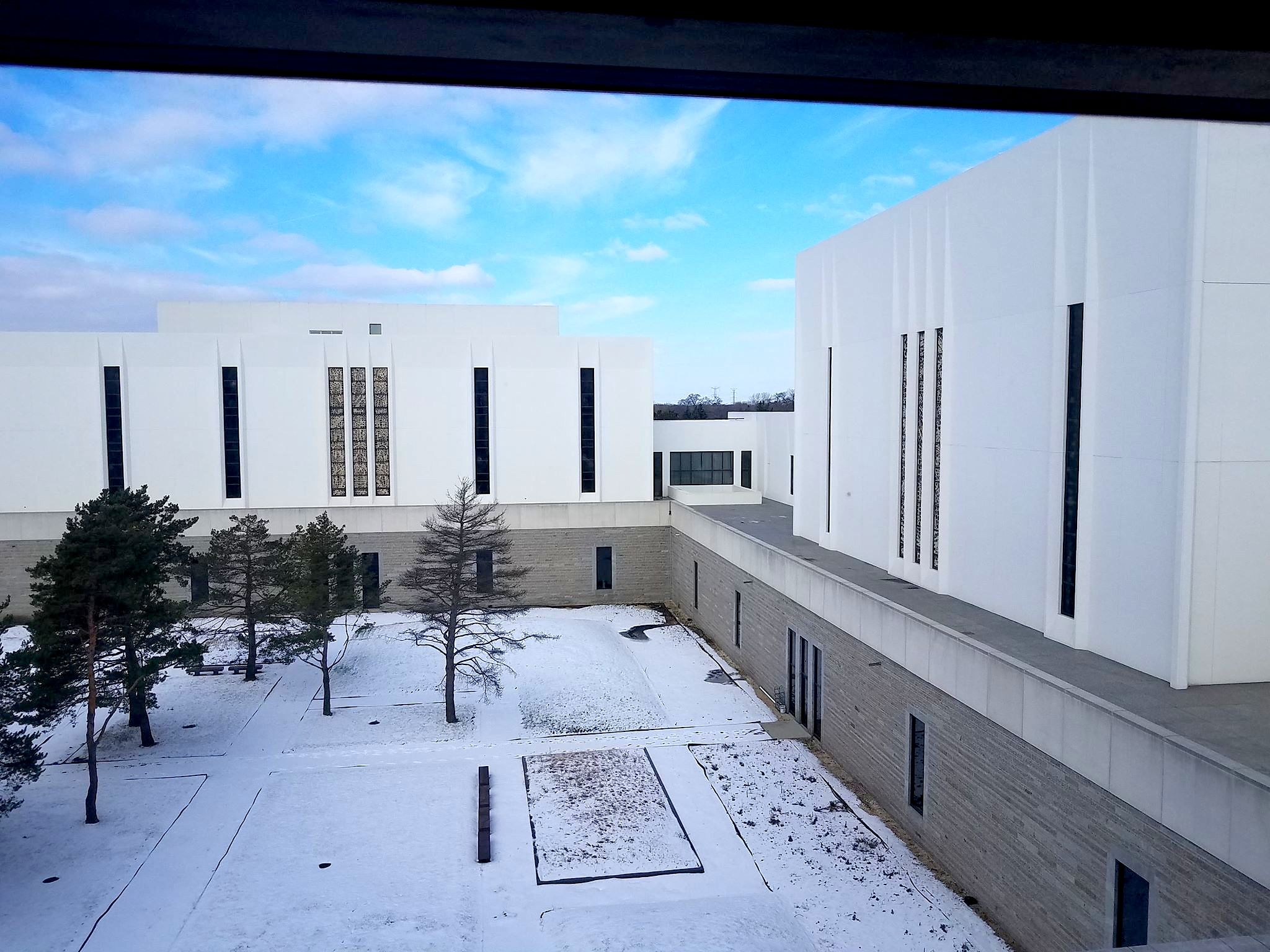
Community Mausoleum of All Saints Cemetery

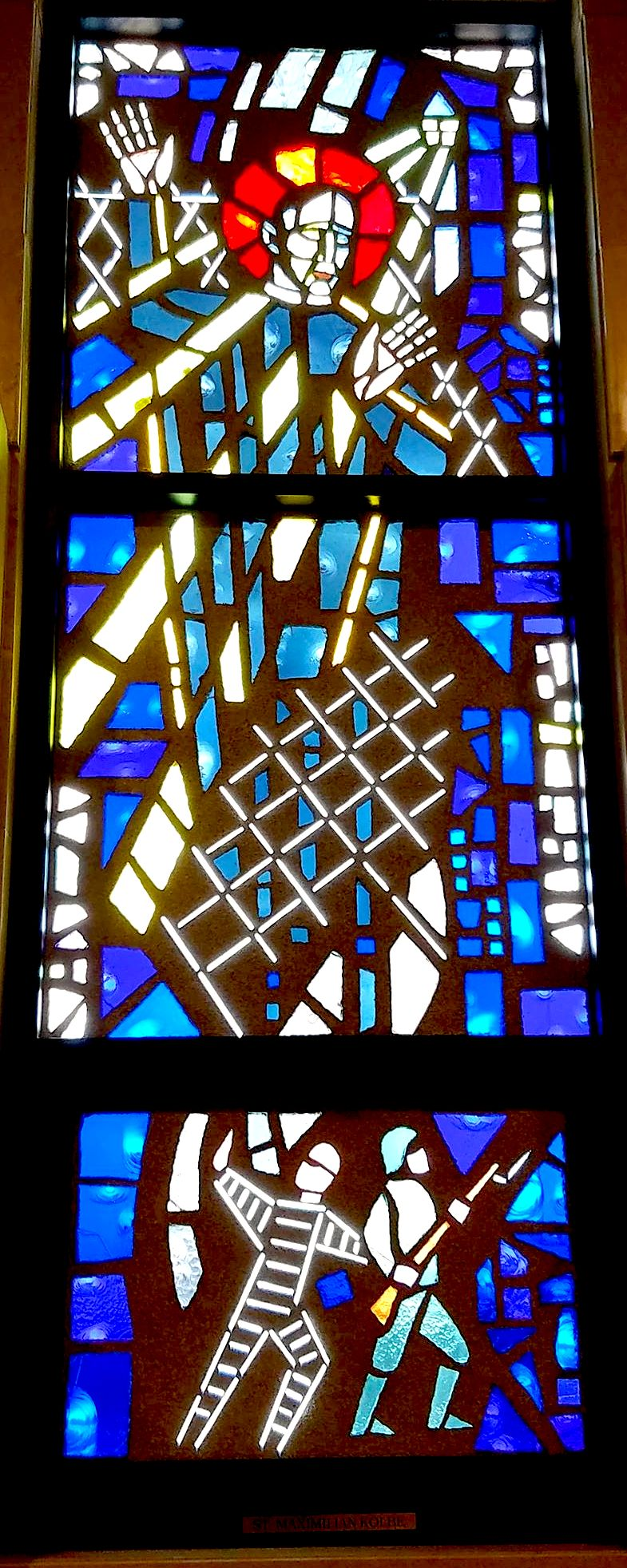
Stained glass commemorating the war dead, Community Mausoleum of All Saints Cemetery

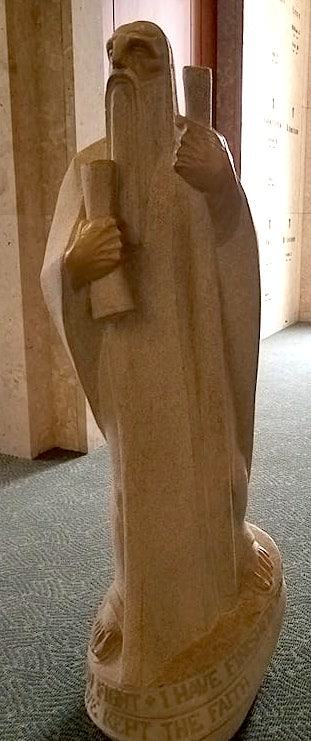
Paul the Apostle, Community Mausoleum of All Saints Cemetery
