= Tony Petitti =

American sports and media executive

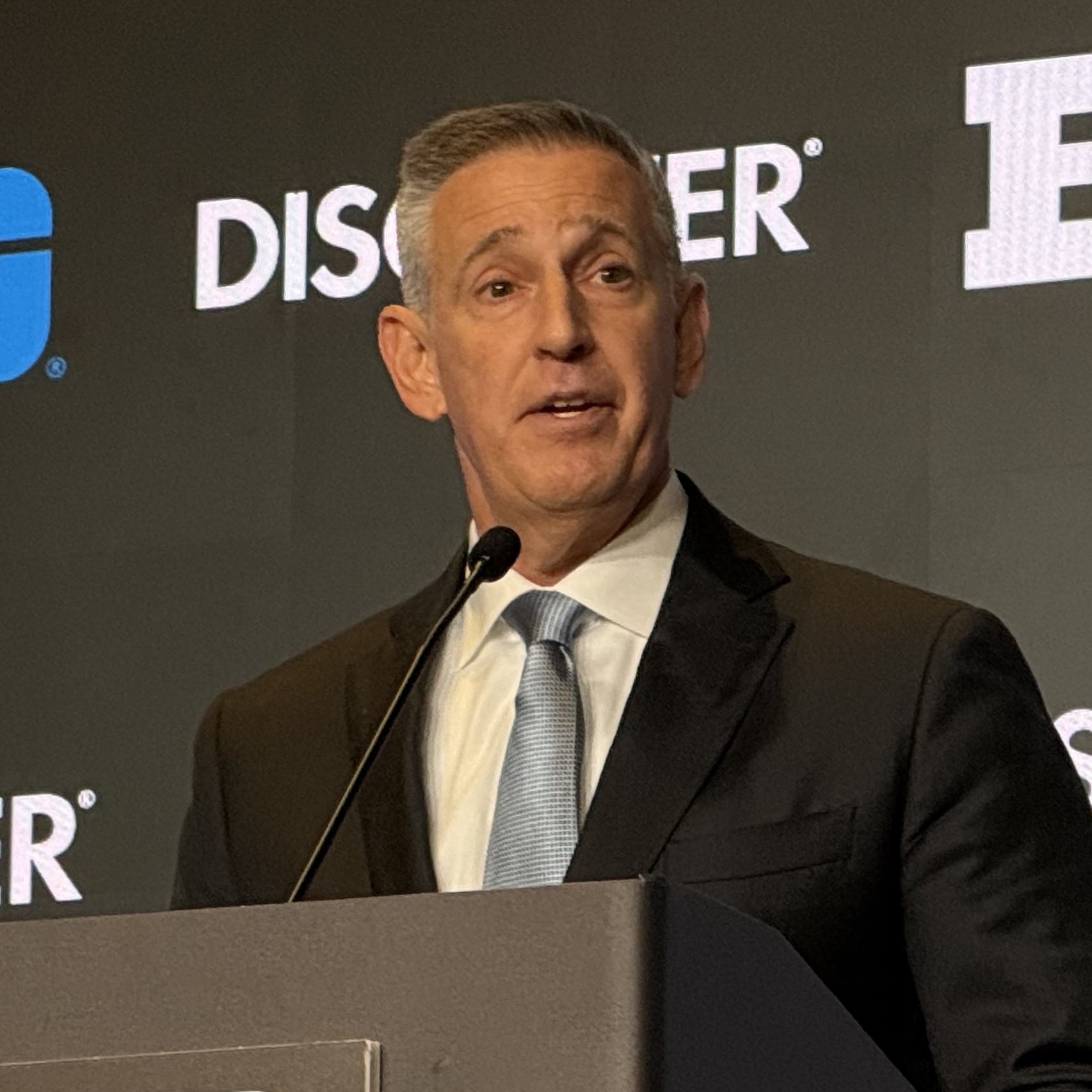
- Petitti at 2026 Big Ten Media Days
- Born: New York City, U.S.
- Education: Haverford College (BA); Harvard Law School (JD)
- Title: Big Ten Commissioner
- Term: May 15, 2023 - present
- Predecessor: Kevin Warren

Tony Petitti is an American sports executive who is the 7th commissioner of the Big Ten Conference in collegiate sports, holding the position since May 15, 2023.

He was formerly the chief operating officer of Major League Baseball. He succeeded Rob Manfred in the position on January 25, 2015, after Manfred became Commissioner of Baseball. He previously served as the president and chief executive officer of MLB Network, where he oversaw all of the network's day-to-day operations, and was the former president of sports and entertainment of Activision Blizzard.

== Early life and education ==
Petitti grew up in Queens, the son of an NYPD officer. Petitti became the first person in his family to attend college, attending Haverford College, where he majored in economics and earned a bachelor's degree in 1983. He then earned a Juris Doctor degree from Harvard Law School in 1986.

== Career ==
=== Early career ===
Petitti worked for two years at the law firm of Cadwalader, Wickersham & Taft before joining ABC Sports in 1988 as general attorney. In 1994, he was named vice president of programming, where he was responsible for acquiring and scheduling ABC Sports programming, and served in that role through 1996.

=== CBS (1997–2008) ===
Petitti was hired by CBS in 1997 as senior vice president of business affairs and programming. In December 2005, Pettiti was named executive vice president, CBS Sports, "responsible for all day-to-day operations of CBS Sports," where he was largely responsible for the network's NFL coverage. "Basically, I’m responsible for everything you see on Sunday." It was announced on January 3, 2008, that Petitti would be placed in charge of day-to-day operations of CSTV, the college sports network that was absorbed into CBS Sports, effectively replacing network co-founder Brian Bedol, who had been serving as president of CSTV since the network was purchased by CBS Corporation in 2005. CSTV was renamed the CBS College Sports Network on March 16, 2008, and eventually evolved to become CBS Sports Network.

=== MLB (2008–2020) ===
In April 2008 Pettiti left CBS to become the head of MLB Network, which launched in January 2009.

=== Activision Blizzard (2020–2021) ===
Petitti left MLB after more than a decade to take a job as president of sports and entertainment at gaming giant Activison Blizzard in the Sports and Entertainment Sector. He left Activision Blizzard in mid-2021 after less than a year in the role.

=== The 33rd Team (2022–2023) ===
Petitti in 2022 joined the football analysis company The 33rd Team.

=== Big Ten (2023–present) ===
Petitti was named the Big Ten Conference's seventh commissioner in April 2023. He began work on May 15, 2023. During his tenure, he continued the expansion begun by his predecessor, Kevin Warren, by adding Washington and Oregon to the conference, beginning with the 2024 season.
