= George McCaskey =

American football executive (born 1956)

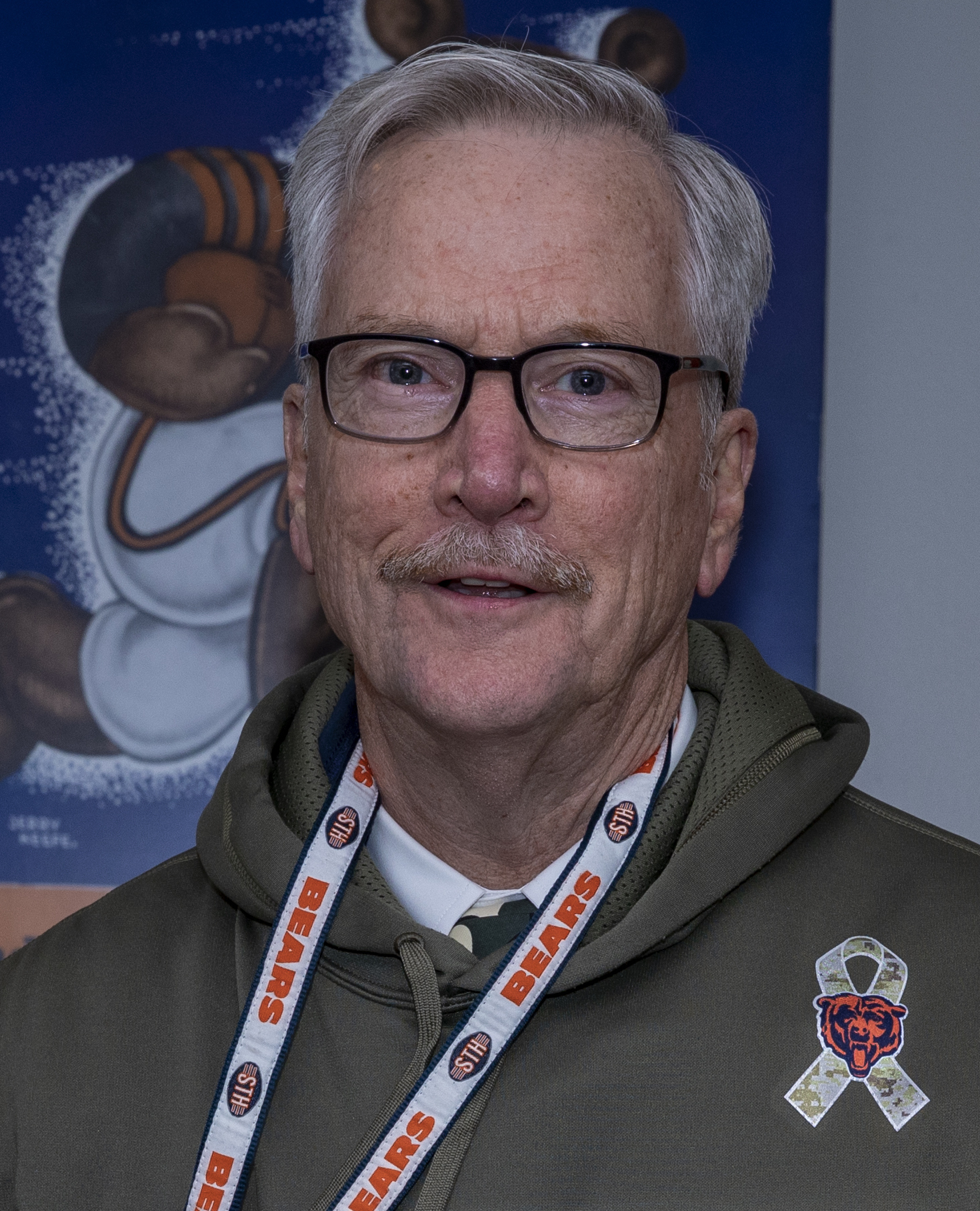
- McCaskey in 2022
- Born: George Halas McCaskey; March 29, 1956 (age 70); Chicago, Illinois, U.S.
- Education: Arizona State University (BA, JD, LLM)
- Spouse: Barb
- Children: 1
- Parent(s): Virginia Halas; Ed McCaskey
- Relatives: George Halas (grandfather); Michael McCaskey (brother); George Halas Jr. (uncle)
- Football career

Chicago Bears
- Title: Owner and chair

Career history
- Chicago Bears (2011–present) Chair; Chicago Bears (2025–present) Owner

George Halas McCaskey (born March 29, 1956) is an American football executive who is the chair and controlling owner of the Chicago Bears of the National Football League (NFL). He replaced his brother Michael McCaskey as chair in 2011. He is the son of Virginia Halas McCaskey and grandson of team founder George Halas.

== Early life ==
McCaskey, the eighth-oldest child of Bears owner Virginia Halas McCaskey and Ed McCaskey (who himself was a former Bears chair), was originally an assistant state attorney in Lee and DeKalb counties. McCaskey also worked in television after graduating with a bachelor's degree (1978) from Arizona State University and a Juris Doctor degree (1981) from Arizona State University College of Law, and was a reporter for an NBC affiliate in Peoria.

== Chicago Bears career ==
McCaskey was the Bears' senior director of ticket operations from 1991 through 2004 and has been a member of the team's board of directors since then.

In 2011, during the NFL lockout, McCaskey's brother Michael retired as chair of the club after 12 years. Before he assumed his position, he met with Chicago Blackhawks owner Rocky Wirtz, as well as White Sox and Bulls owner Jerry Reinsdorf. Jerry Jones of the Dallas Cowboys was the first NFL owner with whom he met.

With his mother's death, McCaskey became the highest figure in the Bears organization, with team president and CEO Kevin Warren reporting to him. While the president oversees structural changes such as hiring and firing the general manager, the ownership provides input; McCaskey explained in 2012, shortly after the departure of general manager Jerry Angelo, that he did not "feel any particular need to place a personal stamp on the Bears, that my job was to work with and in support of the president and CEO." The Bears are 105–140 (.429) in George McCaskey's 15 seasons as chair — ranking 25th in the NFL in that span.

== Personal life ==
McCaskey and his wife, Barb, reside in Sycamore, Illinois. The couple has a son, Conor, who played quarterback at St. Mary's Catholic School and Sycamore High School. McCaskey also volunteers as a referee and umpire for Illinois high school sports in Sycamore.
