= John J. Kelly =

Marine Corps Medal of Honor recipient (1898–1957)

John Joseph Kelly
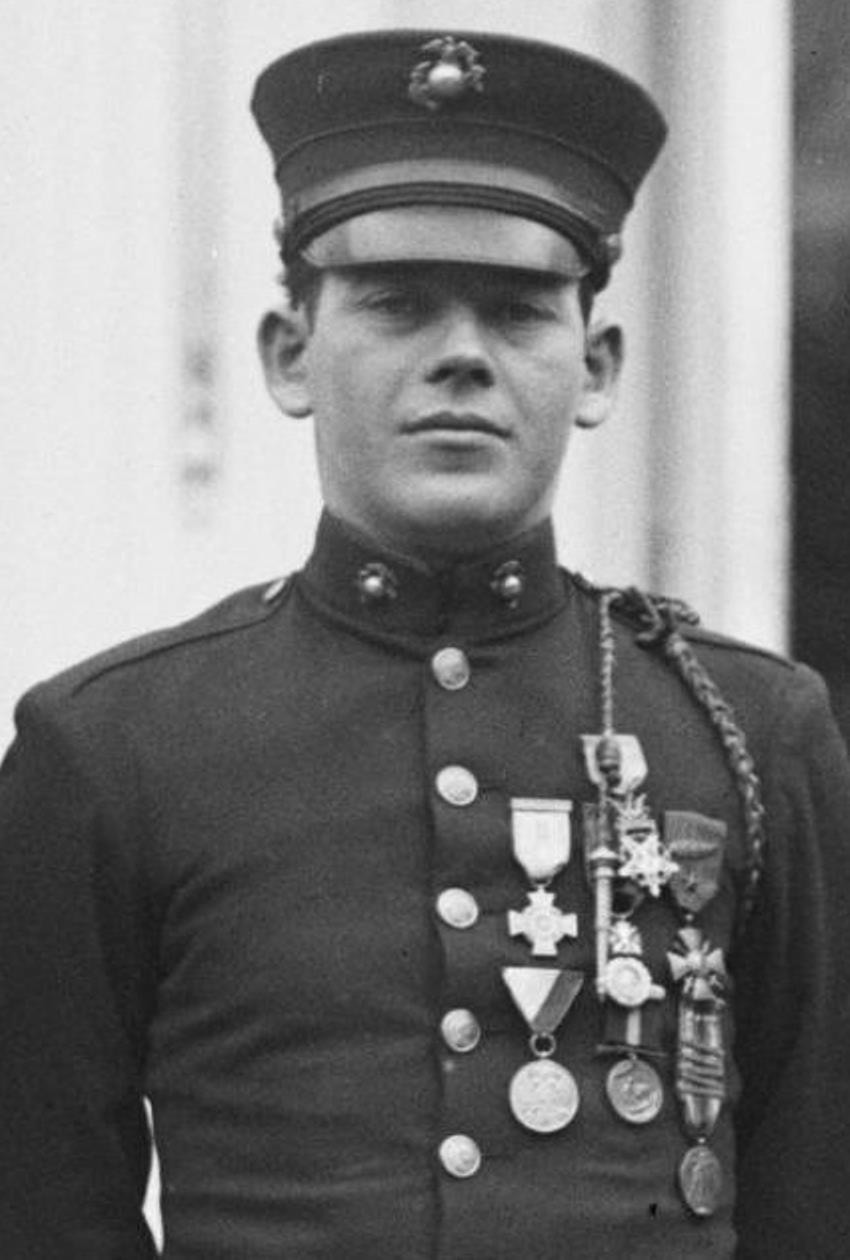
- Recipient of the Army and Navy Medals of Honor
- Born: June 24, 1898; Chicago, Illinois, U.S.
- Died: November 20, 1957 (aged 59); Chicago, Illinois, U.S.
- Burial place: All Saints Cemetery
- Military career
- Allegiance: United States of America
- Branch: United States Marine Corps
- Service years: 1917–19
- Rank: Private
- Units: 6th Marine Regiment, 2nd Marine Division
- Conflicts: World War I: Battle of Château-Thierry; Battle of Saint-Mihiel; Battle of Blanc Mont Ridge
- Awards: Medal of Honor (Army & Navy); Silver Star (5); Purple Heart (2)

John Joseph Kelly (June 24, 1898 – November 20, 1957) was a United States Marine who was awarded both the Army and Navy Medals of Honor for his heroic actions on October 13, 1918, at the Battle of Blanc Mont Ridge, France, during World War I. He was the last surviving of 19 two-time Medal of Honor recipients when he died, although he received both awards for the same action.

== Biography ==
Kelly was born in Chicago, Illinois on June 24, 1898. He enlisted as a private in the United States Marine Corps on May 15, 1917, in Port Royal, South Carolina. On September 5, 1917, he joined the 7th Company, 6th Regiment, at Quantico, Virginia, and on September 12, 1917, he was transferred to the 78th Company. On January 19, 1918, his regiment embarked from Philadelphia, Pennsylvania on the USS Henderson and arrived at St. Nazaire, France on February 5, 1918.

Private Kelly participated in engagements at Château-Thierry, St. Mihiel, Blanc Mont and the Meuse-Argonne offensive. In the desperate fighting at Blanc Mont Ridge, he ran "100 yards in advance of the front line and attacked an enemy machine-gun nest", for which he was awarded both the Army and Navy Medals of Honor.

He also participated in the march to the Rhine River and in the occupation of the Koblenz Bridgehead, from November 17, to December 12, 1918. Pvt Kelly was honorably discharged, with character "Excellent" at the Marine Barracks, Quantico, Virginia on August 14, 1919.

The circumstances of Pvt Kelly's Medal of Honor decoration were unique. It was pinned on his chest by General John J. Pershing, Commander-in-Chief, American Expeditionary Forces, while Pvt Kelly was with the Army of Occupation. With him in line, waiting for other decorations were U.S. Army Major Generals Joseph T. Dickman, Charles Henry Muir, William G. Haan and John L. Hines. His foreign decorations include the French Médaille militaire, the French Croix de Guerre with bronze palm and bronze star; the Italian Croce al Merito di Guerra and the Montenegrin Medal for Military Bravery.

At the time of his death on November 20, 1957, his address was listed as Chicago, Illinois and he is buried at All Saints Cemetery, Des Plaines, Illinois.

== Medal of Honor citations ==
Army Medal of Honor

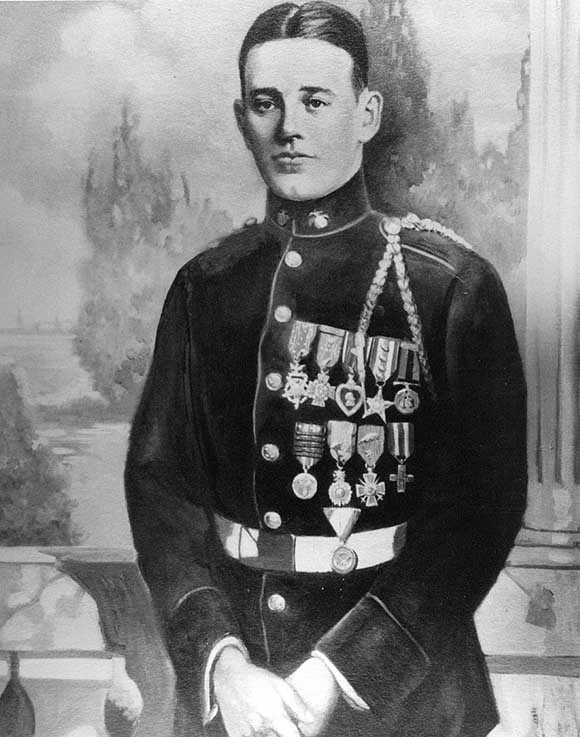
The Army Medal of Honor is on the left in the top row of Kelly's medals. Immediately to the right is the Navy Medal of Honor, in the Tiffany Cross pattern.

Rank and organization: Private, U.S. Marine Corps, 78th Company, 6th Regiment (Marines), 2d Division, American Expeditionary Forces. Place and date: At Blanc Mont Ridge, France; October 3, 1918. Entered service at: Chicago, Illinois. Born: June 24, 1898; Chicago, Illinois. General Orders: War Department, General Orders No. 16 ( January 22, 1919).

Citation:

Private Kelly ran through our own barrage 100 yards in advance of the front line and attacked an enemy machinegun nest, killing the gunner with a grenade, shooting another member of the crew with his pistol, and returning through the barrage with eight prisoners.

Navy Medal of Honor

Kelly, John Joseph
Private, U.S. Marine Corps
78th Company, 6th Regiment

Citation:

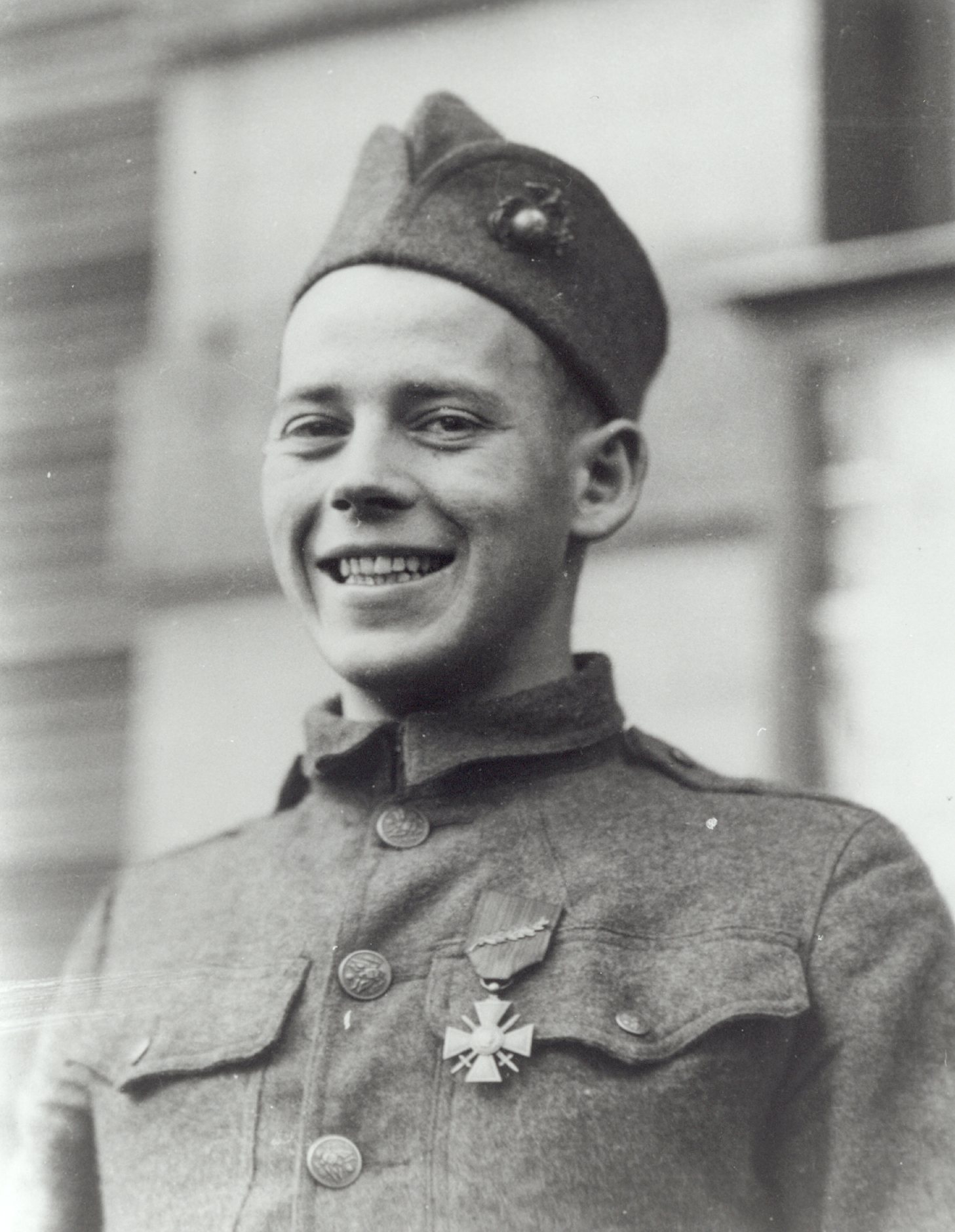
Private John Joseph Kelly, USMC, World War I recipient of both the Army and Navy Medals of Honor (photo from official Marine Corps biography)

For conspicuous gallantry and intrepidity above and beyond the call of duty in action with the enemy at BLANC MONT RIDGE, France, October 3, 1918. Private Kelly ran through our own barrage one hundred yards in advance of the front line and attacked an enemy machine-gun nest, killing the gunner with a grenade, shooting another member of the crew with his pistol and returned through the barrage with eight prisoners.

== Silver Star citations ==
Rank and organization: Private, U.S. Marine Corps, 78th Company, 6th Regiment (Marines), 2nd Division, American Expeditionary Forces. Action Date: September 15, 1918. General Orders: GHQ, American Expeditionary Forces, Citation Orders No. 3 (June 3, 1919).

Citation:

By direction of the President, under the provisions of the act of Congress approved July 9, 1918 (Bul. No. 43, W.D., 1918), Private John Joseph Kelly (MCSN: 87666/121285), United States Marine Corps, is cited by the Commanding General, American Expeditionary Forces, for gallantry in action and a silver star may be placed upon the ribbon of the Victory Medals awarded him. Private Kelly distinguished himself by gallantry in action while serving with the 78th Company, 6th Regiment (Marines), 2d Division, American Expeditionary Forces, in action near Thiaucourt, France, 15 September 1918, in aiding in the capture of an enemy machine gun and four prisoners.

Rank and organization: Private, U.S. Marine Corps, 78th Company, 6th Regiment (Marines), 2nd Division, American Expeditionary Forces. Action Dates: June 6 – July 10, 1918. General Orders: Citation Orders, 2d Division, American Expeditionary Forces.

Citation:

By direction of the President, under the provisions of the act of Congress approved July 9, 1918 (Bul. No. 43, W.D., 1918), Private John Joseph Kelly (MCSN: 87666/121285), United States Marine Corps, is cited by the Commanding General, SECOND Division, American Expeditionary Forces, for gallantry in action and a silver star may be placed upon the ribbon of the Victory Medals awarded him. Private Kelly distinguished himself while serving with the 78th Company, Sixth Regiment (Marines), 2d Division, American Expeditionary Forces at Chateau-Thierry, France, 6 June - 10 July 1918. (SECOND Citation).

Rank and organization: Private, U.S. Marine Corps, 78th Company, 6th Regiment (Marines), 2nd Division, American Expeditionary Forces. Action Dates: September 12 – 16, 1918. General Orders: Citation Orders, 2d Division, American Expeditionary Forces.

Citation:

By direction of the President, under the provisions of the act of Congress approved July 9, 1918 (Bul. No. 43, W.D., 1918), Private John Joseph Kelly (MCSN: 87666/121285), United States Marine Corps, is cited by the Commanding General, SECOND Division, American Expeditionary Forces, for gallantry in action and a silver star may be placed upon the ribbon of the Victory Medals awarded him. Private Kelly distinguished himself while serving with the 78th Company, Sixth Regiment (Marines), 2d Division, American Expeditionary Forces at St. Mihiel, France, 12–16 September 1918. (THIRD Citation).

Rank and organization: Private, U.S. Marine Corps, 78th Company, 6th Regiment (Marines), 2nd Division, American Expeditionary Forces. Action Dates: September 12 – 16, 1918. General Orders: Citation Orders, 2d Division, American Expeditionary Forces.

Citation:

By direction of the President, under the provisions of the act of Congress approved July 9, 1918 (Bul. No. 43, W.D., 1918), Private John Joseph Kelly (MCSN: 87666/121285), United States Marine Corps, is cited by the Commanding General, SECOND Division, American Expeditionary Forces, for gallantry in action and a silver star may be placed upon the ribbon of the Victory Medals awarded him. Private Kelly distinguished himself while serving with the 78th Company, Sixth Regiment (Marines), 2d Division, American Expeditionary Forces at St. Mihiel, France, 12–16 September 1918. (FOURTH Citation).

== Military awards ==
Kelly's military decorations and awards include:

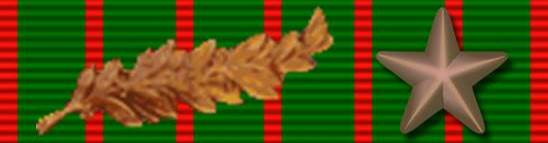

| 1st row | Medal of Honor (Army) | | |
| 2nd row | Medal of Honor (Navy) | Silver Star w/ three bronze oak leaf clusters | Purple Heart w/ one bronze oak leaf cluster |
| 3rd row | Marine Corps Good Conduct Medal | World War I Victory Medal w/ five bronze battle stars to denote credit for the Aisne, Aisne-Marne, St. Mihiel, Meuse-Argonne and Defensive Sector battle clasps. | Médaille militaire (French Republic) |
| 4th row | Croix de Guerre 1914–1918 with one bronze palm and one bronze star (French Republic) | Croce al Merito di Guerra (Italy) | Silver Medal for Bravery (Kingdom of Montenegro) |
| Unit Award | French Fourragère – Authorized permanent wear based on two French Croix de Guerre with Bronze Palm and Bronze Star unit citations awarded to 6th Marines in WWI. | | |

== See also ==
- List of Medal of Honor recipients
- List of Medal of Honor recipients for World War I
