= Jim Parmer =

American football player (1927–2005)

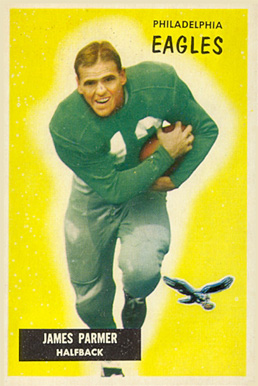
- Parmer on a 1955 Bowman football card

No. 43
- Positions: Fullback, halfback

Personal information
- Born: April 15, 1927; Dallas, Texas, U.S.
- Died: April 20, 2005 (aged 78); Lubbock, Texas, U.S.
- Listed height: 6 ft 0 in (1.83 m)
- Listed weight: 193 lb (88 kg)

Career information
- College: Texas A&M, Oklahoma State
- NFL draft: 1948: 25th round, 234th overall pick

Career history
- Philadelphia Eagles (1948–1956)

Awards and highlights
- 2× NFL champion (1948, 1949)

Career NFL statistics
- Rushing yards: 1,636
- Rushing average: 3.6
- Receptions: 53
- Receiving yards: 351
- Total touchdowns: 21
- Stats at Pro Football Reference

James Richard Parmer (April 25, 1927 – April 20, 2005) was an American professional football running back in the National Football League (NFL) who played for nine seasons for the Philadelphia Eagles. He later worked as a scout.

Parmer served as an assistant coach for the Texas Tech Red Raiders football team under DeWitt Weaver during the 1960 season. Parmer subsequently worked as a scout in the NFL for 35 years. George Halas Jr. hired him as a professional scout for the Chicago Bears, where he helped draft several players who appeared on 1985 Bears roster that won Super Bowl XX.

Parmer died at the age of 79 in 2005 of natural causes. His grandson is Jeff Ireland, a football executive who was previously the general manager for the New Orleans Saints.
