= Michael R. Blanchfield =

United States Army Medal of Honor recipient

Michael Reinert Blanchfield
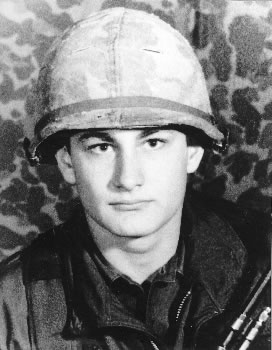
- Born: January 4, 1950; Minneapolis, Minnesota, U.S.
- Died: July 3, 1969 (aged 19); Binh Dinh Province, Republic of Vietnam
- Burial place: All Saints Cemetery, Des Plaines, Illinois
- Military career
- Allegiance: United States of America
- Branch: United States Army
- Service years: 1967–1969
- Rank: Specialist Four
- Units: Company A, 4th Battalion, 503d Infantry, 173d Airborne Brigade
- Conflicts: Vietnam War †
- Awards: Medal of Honor; Purple Heart

Michael Reinert Blanchfield (January 4, 1950 – July 3, 1969) was a United States Army soldier and a recipient of the United States military's highest decoration—the Medal of Honor—for his actions in the Vietnam War.

During a search and destroy operation in Binh Dinh Province, Blanchfield confronted a Viet Cong militant, who threw two grenades at him and his fellow soldiers. After being injured by the first grenade, Blanchfield threw himself on the second grenade and saved his fellow soldier's lives.

== Biography ==
Blanchfield joined the Army from Chicago, Illinois, in 1967, and by July 3, 1969, was serving as a Specialist Four in Company A, 4th Battalion (Airborne), 503d Infantry, 173d Airborne Brigade. On that day, in Binh Dinh Province, Republic of Vietnam, Blanchfield smothered the blast of a hand grenade with his body, sacrificing himself to protect those around him.

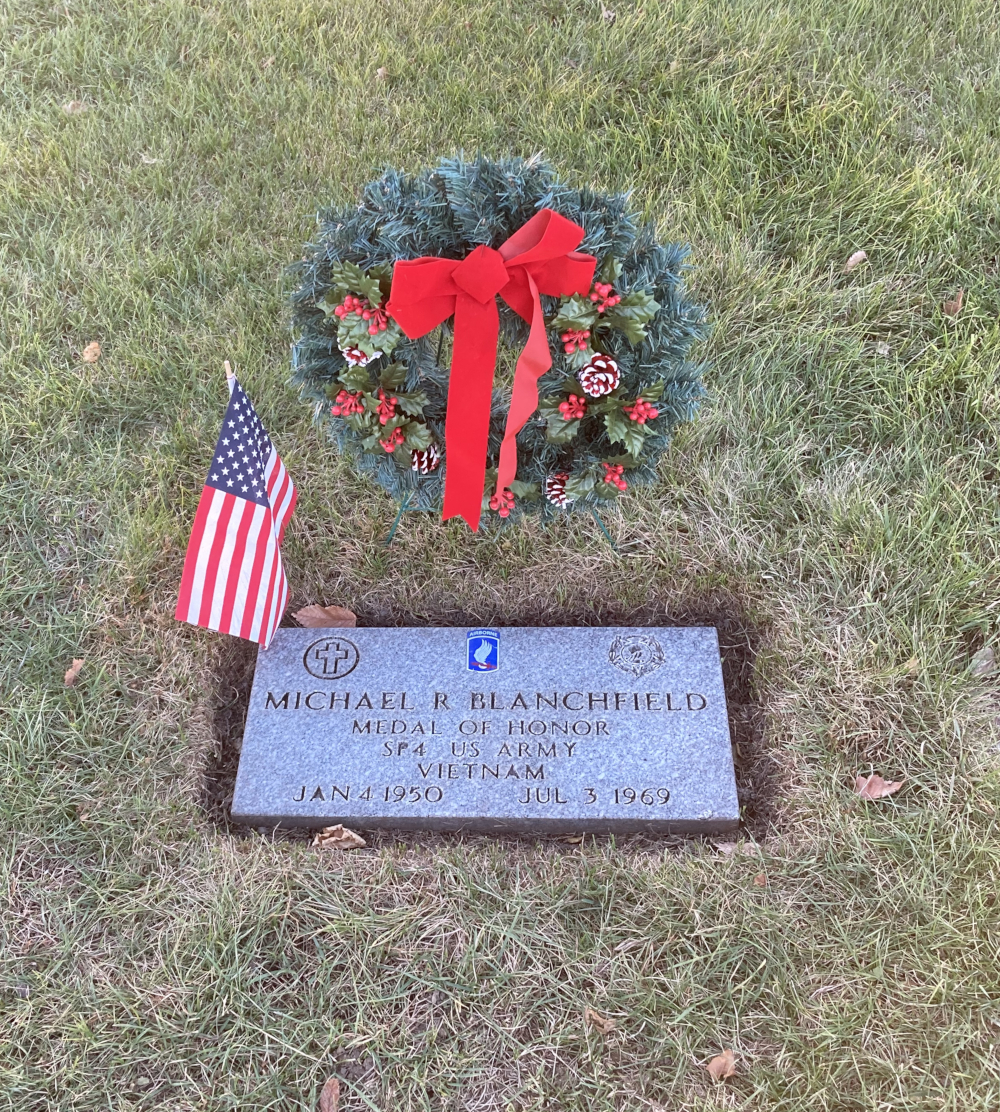
Blanchfield's grave at All Saints Cemetery

Blanchfield, aged 19 at his death, was buried in All Saints Cemetery, Des Plaines, Illinois.

== Medal of Honor citation ==
Specialist Blanchfield's official Medal of Honor citation reads:

For conspicuous gallantry and intrepidity in action at the risk of his life above and beyond the call of duty. Sp4c. Blanchfield distinguished himself while serving as a rifleman in Company A on a combat patrol. The patrol surrounded a group of houses to search for suspects. During the search of 1 of the huts, a man suddenly ran out toward a nearby tree line. Sp4c. Blanchfield, who was on guard outside the hut, saw the man, shouted for him to halt, and began firing at him as the man ignored the warning and continued to run. The suspect suddenly threw a grenade toward the hut and its occupants. Although the exploding grenade severely wounded Sp4c. Blanchfield and several others, he regained his feet to continue the pursuit of the enemy. The fleeing enemy threw a second grenade which landed near Sp4c. Blanchfield and several members of his patrol. Instantly realizing the danger, he shouted a warning to his comrades. Sp4c. Blanchfield unhesitatingly and with complete disregard for his safety, threw himself on the grenade, absorbing the full and fatal impact of the explosion. By his gallant action and self-sacrifice, he was able to save the lives and prevent injury to 4 members of the patrol and several Vietnamese civilians in the immediate area. Sp4c. Blanchfield's extraordinary courage and gallantry at the cost of his life above and beyond the call of duty are in keeping with the highest traditions of the military service and reflect great credit upon himself, his unit, and the U.S. Army.

== See also ==
- List of Medal of Honor recipients for the Vietnam War
