= Brian's Song =

1971 television film directed by Buzz Kulik

- Premiere advertisement from TV Guide
- Genre: Biography; Drama; Sport
- Based on: I Am Third by Gale Sayers; Al Silverman
- Written by: William Blinn
- Directed by: Buzz Kulik
- Starring: James Caan; Billy Dee Williams
- Music by: Michel Legrand
- Country of origin: United States
- Original language: English

Production
- Producer: Paul Junger Witt
- Cinematography: Joseph F. Biroc
- Editor: Bud S. Isaacs
- Running time: 74 minutes
- Production company: Screen Gems

Original release
- Network: ABC
- Release: November 30, 1971

Brian's Song is a 1971 ABC Movie of the Week that recounts the life of Brian Piccolo (James Caan), a Chicago Bears football player stricken with terminal cancer, focusing on his friendship with teammate Gale Sayers (Billy Dee Williams). Piccolo's and Sayers's sharply differing temperaments and racial backgrounds made them unlikely to become friends but they did, becoming the first interracial roommates in the history of the National Football League. The film chronicles the evolution of their friendship, ending with Piccolo's death in 1970. The production was such a success on ABC that it was later shown in theaters by Columbia Pictures with a major premiere in Chicago; however, it was soon withdrawn for lack of business. Critics have called the movie one of the finest television movies ever made. A 2005 readers' poll taken by Entertainment Weekly ranked Brian's Song seventh in its list of the top "guy-cry" films.

The movie is based on Sayers's account of his friendship with Piccolo and coping with Piccolo's illness in Sayers's 1970 autobiography, I Am Third. The film was written by William Blinn, whose script one Dallas television critic called "highly restrained, steering clear of any overt sentimentality [yet conveying] the genuine affection the two men felt so deeply for each other."

== Plot ==
The movie begins as Chicago Bears rookie running back Gale Sayers arrives at team practice as an errant punt lands near him. Fellow rookie running back Brian Piccolo goes to retrieve the ball, and Sayers flips it to him. Before Sayers meets with coach George Halas in his office, Piccolo tells him – as a prank – that Halas has a hearing problem, and Sayers acts strangely at the meeting. Sayers pranks him back by placing mashed potatoes on his seat while Piccolo is singing his alma mater's fight song.

During practice, Piccolo struggles while Sayers shines. Sayers and Piccolo are placed as roommates, a rarity during the racial strife at the time. Piccolo is afraid that he did not make the team, but Sayers makes the point that "if you didn't make the team, we wouldn't be placed together as roommates." Their friendship flourishes, in football and in life, quickly extending to their wives, Joy Piccolo and Linda Sayers. Sayers quickly becomes a standout player, but he injures his knee in a game against the San Francisco 49ers. To aid in Sayers's recovery, Piccolo brings a weight machine to his house. In Sayers' place, Piccolo rushes for 160 yards in a 17–16 win over the Los Angeles Rams and is given the game ball. Piccolo challenges Sayers to a race across the park, where Sayers stumbles but wins. Piccolo wins the starting fullback position, meaning both he and Sayers will now be on the field together, and both excel in their roles.

Piccolo starts to lose weight and his performance declines, so he is sent to a hospital for a diagnosis. Soon after, Halas tells Sayers that Piccolo has cancer and will have part of a lung removed. In an emotional speech to his teammates, Sayers states that they will win the game for Piccolo and give him the game ball. When the players later visit the hospital, Piccolo teases them about losing the game, laughing that the line in the old movie wasn't "let’s blow one for the Gipper."

After a game against the St. Louis Cardinals, Sayers visits Joy, who reveals that Piccolo has to have another surgery for his tumor. After he is awarded the "George S. Halas Most Courageous Player Award", Sayers dedicates his award to Piccolo, telling the crowd that they had selected the wrong person for the prize and saying, "I love Brian Piccolo, and I'd like all of you to love him, too. And tonight, when you hit your knees, please ask God to love him." In a call, Sayers mentions that he gave Piccolo a pint of blood while he was in critical condition. Piccolo dies with his wife by his side. The movie ends with a flashback of Piccolo and Sayers running through the park, while Halas narrates that Piccolo died at age 26 and is remembered not for how he died but for how he lived.

== Cast ==
- James Caan as Brian Piccolo
- Billy Dee Williams as Gale Sayers
- Jack Warden as Coach George Halas
- Shelley Fabares as Joy Piccolo
- Judy Pace as Linda Sayers
- Bernie Casey as J. C. Caroline
- David Huddleston as Ed McCaskey
- Ron Feinberg as Doug Atkins
- Jack Concannon as Himself
- Abe Gibron as Himself
- Ed O'Bradovich as Himself
- Dick Butkus as Himself
- Chicago Bears as Themselves

== Music ==
The musical theme to Brian's Song, "The Hands of Time", was a popular tune during the early 1970s and has become a standard. The music for the film was by Michel Legrand, with lyrics to the song by Alan and Marilyn Bergman.

Legrand's instrumental version of the theme song charted for eight weeks in 1972, peaking at No. 56 on the Billboard Hot 100. It also won the Grammy Award for Best Instrumental Composition.

== Reception ==
The film was acclaimed by critics and is often cited as one of the greatest television films ever made, as well as one of the greatest sports films.

The film was the most watched movie on U.S. television during 1971 and the most watched made-for-TV movie ever with a Nielsen rating of 32.9 and an audience share of 48% until it was surpassed by The Night Stalker in January 1972.

Beginning in Fall 1972, the film was made available to schools all over the United States by the Learning Corporation of America.

Review aggregator Rotten Tomatoes reports that 85% of 13 critics have given the film a positive review, with an average rating of 7.50/10. The site's consensus is that "Buoyed by standout performances from James Caan and Billy Dee Williams, Brian's Song is a touching tale of friendship whose central relationship transcends its standard sports movie moments."

In his 2016 book co-written with Alan Sepinwall titled TV (The Book), television critic Matt Zoller Seitz named Brian's Song as the fifth greatest American TV-movie of all time, stating that the film was "The dramatic and emotional template for a good number of sports films and male weepies (categories which tend to overlap a bit)", as well as "an influential early example of the interracial buddy movie." Filmink magazine said the film "has a deserved reputation for the definitive guy cry movie – cancer, race, football, stoicism."

== Accolades ==
| Year | Award | Category | Nominee(s) | Result | Ref. |
|---|---|---|---|---|---|
| 1972 | American Cinema Editors Awards | Best Edited Television Program | Bud S. Isaacs | Nominated | |
| 1972 | Directors Guild of America Awards | Outstanding Directorial Achievement in Movies for Television | Buzz Kulik | Won | |
| 1972 | Golden Globe Awards | Best Television Film | | Nominated | |
| 1972 | Peabody Awards | Entertainment | ABC Television and William Blinn | Won | |
| 1972 | Primetime Emmy Awards | Outstanding Single Program – Drama or Comedy | Paul Junger Witt | Won | |
| 1972 | Primetime Emmy Awards | Outstanding Single Performance by an Actor in a Leading Role | James Caan | Nominated | |
| 1972 | Primetime Emmy Awards | Outstanding Single Performance by an Actor in a Leading Role | Billy Dee Williams | Nominated | |
| 1972 | Primetime Emmy Awards | Outstanding Performance by an Actor in a Supporting Role in a Drama | Jack Warden | Won | |
| 1972 | Primetime Emmy Awards | Outstanding Directorial Achievement in Drama – A Single Program | Buzz Kulik | Nominated | |
| 1972 | Primetime Emmy Awards | Outstanding Writing Achievement in Drama – Adaptation | William Blinn | Won | |
| 1972 | Primetime Emmy Awards | Outstanding Achievement in Cinematography for Entertainment Programming – For a Special or Feature Length Program Made for Television | Joseph Biroc | Won | |
| 1972 | Primetime Emmy Awards | Outstanding Achievement in Film Editing for Entertainment Programming – For a Special or Feature Length Program Made for Television | Bud S. Isaacs | Won | |
| 1972 | Primetime Emmy Awards | Outstanding Achievement in Film Sound Editing | George Emick, Wayne Fury, Ralph Hickey, Marvin I. Kosberg, Paul Laune, Monty Pearce, and Harold Wooley | Nominated | |
| 1972 | Primetime Emmy Awards | Outstanding Achievement in Film Sound Mixing | William J. Montague and Alfred E. Overton | Nominated | |
| 1972 | Primetime Emmy Awards | Outstanding Achievement in Music Composition – For a Special Program | Michel Legrand | Nominated | |
| 1973 | Grammy Awards | Best Instrumental Composition | "Brian's Song" – Michel Legrand | Won | |
| 1998 | Producers Guild of America Awards | Hall of Fame – Television Programs | Paul Junger Witt | Won | |
| 2000 | Online Film & Television Association Awards | Hall of Fame – Television Programs | | Inducted | |
| 2006 | TV Land Awards | Blockbuster Movie of the Week | James Caan and Billy Dee Williams | Won | |

== Remake ==
Thirty years after its original airing, a remake was aired in 2001 on ABC's The Wonderful World of Disney starring Mekhi Phifer as Sayers and Sean Maher as Piccolo.

== See also ==
- List of American football films
