= Al Silverman =

American sportswriter (1926–2019)

Elwyn Harmon Silverman (12 April 1926 – 10 March 2019), known as Al Silverman, was a noted sports writer, the author of 10 books and numerous essays published in, among other publications, Playboy, Saga, and Sport magazine. Among his publications is I Am Third, written with Gale Sayers, which was adapted for the 1971 television movie Brian's Song.

In addition to his writing, Silverman also worked as an editor and publisher. He was editor of Sport Magazine from 1951 to 1963 and was CEO and chairman of Book of the Month Club from 1972 to 1988. Most recently, Silverman served as editor and publisher at Viking Press from 1989 to 1997.

== Marriage ==
Silverman was married to Rosa Silverman, a ceramic sculptor.

== Bibliography ==
- Silverman, Al. The Time of Their Lives: The Golden Age of Great American Book Publishers, Their Editors, and Authors. New York: Truman Talley, 2008. Print.
