= Loyola University Chicago Quinlan School of Business =

Business school of Loyola University-Chicago

Coordinates: 41°53′52.6″N 87°37′40.5″W

- Type: Private
- Established: 1922
- President: Mark C. Reed
- Dean: Michael Behnam
- Location: Chicago, IL
- Website: http://www.luc.edu/quinlan

Loyola University Chicago Quinlan School of Business encompasses the undergraduate, graduate, and executive-level business programs of Loyola University Chicago in downtown Chicago, Illinois, with campuses and partnerships in Rome, Beijing, and Saigon-Ho Chi Minh City. It is Chicago's only Jesuit business school.

Quinlan was founded in 1922 to help working-class employees move from the factory floor to the front office. In 2012, it was named for Michael R. Quinlan, the University's two-time alumnus, who worked his way up from the mailroom to the boardroom of McDonald's as chairman and CEO.

== Accreditation ==
Loyola's Quinlan School of Business undergraduate and graduate programs are accredited by the Association to Advance Collegiate School of Business. It is the only AACSB-accredited school to offer a specialized MBA in Healthcare Management, and the only AACSB-accredited school in Illinois to offer an MS in Supply Chain Management.

== Endowment ==
The Quinlan School of Business sits on an endowment of more than $67 million in total.

== Schreiber Center ==
In fall 2015, Quinlan opened the doors on its new building in downtown Chicago. The building, at State and Pearson on Loyola's Water Tower Campus, was named the John and Kathy Schreiber Center in recognition of a $10 million gift from the Schreiber family. John Schreiber earned his undergraduate degree from Quinlan in 1968.

== Undergraduate programs ==
Loyola's Quinlan School of Business offers programs in accounting, economics, entrepreneurship, finance, human resources, information systems, international business, management, marketing, sport management, and supply chain management. There is also a USA/Europe double degree program that allows undergraduate students to earn a USA bachelor's degree and an official European degree (from Universidad Loyola Andalusia) and two combined programs which allow students to complete an MBA or MSA in five years.

== Executive education ==
Quinlan offers executive education courses for working professionals and organizations. These courses, taught by Quinlan business school faculty and expert practitioners, provide management and leadership skills training for emerging leaders and corporations.

For individuals, Quinlan offers a suite of certificate programs: Project Management, the mini-MBA, and Health Care Management. These open-enrollment programs are offered at the Begich Center for Executive Education, located on Loyola's downtown Water Tower Campus.

Custom programs are designed with a particular organization in mind and are customized to meet an organizations' specific needs and learning objectives. Custom programs can be conducted at the downtown Begich Center or on site at client facilities.

== Rankings ==
In 2015, Loyola's Quinlan School of Business was ranked by U.S. News & World Report as Chicago's No. 1 undergraduate business school, as well as a top 3 MBA program in Chicago.

The school's graduate program has been named a top 20 part-time MBA program in the nation by Businessweek. Its specialty master's programs are considered some of the best in the nation by U.S. News & World Report: finance (top 20), marketing (top 20), accounting (top 30). U.S. News also ranks Quinlan's MBA for Executives No. 25 in the nation. Meanwhile, for three cycles in a row, the Quinlan MBA has been included in the Aspen Institute's Beyond Grey Pinstripes list for its focus on ethics and social responsibility, ranking No. 16 in the world in 2011.

Undergraduate rankings

- No. 17 undergraduate entrepreneurship program in the nation (U.S. News & World Report, 2014)
- No. 17 undergraduate finance program in the nation (U.S. News & World Report, 2014)
- No. 86 undergraduate business program in the nation (U.S. News & World Report, 2014)
- No. 101 university in the nation (U.S. News & World Report, 2014)
- No. 44 best value university in the nation (U.S. News & World Report, 2014)

Graduate rankings

- No. 5 small, full-time MBA program in the world ("Beyond Grey Pinstripes," (Aspen Institute, 2011–12)
- No. 16 MBA program in the world ("Beyond Grey Pinstripes," (Aspen Institute, 2011–12)
- No. 18 graduate marketing program in the nation (U.S. News & World Report, 2014)
- No. 24 graduate accounting program in the nation (U.S. News & World Report, 2014)
- No. 39 part-time MBA program in the nation (Bloomberg Businessweek, 2013)
- No. 43 part-time MBA program in the nation ((U.S. News & World Report, 2014)
- No. 52 most social media friendly MBA school in the nation (OnlineMBAPage.com, 2013)

== Global awareness ==
Loyola's Quinlan School of Business offers study abroad in Southeast Asia, Europe, South America, and the Caribbean. Countries represented in the Quinlan School of Business student body include Australia, Brazil, Canada, China, Croatia, Dominican Republic, Egypt, France, Great Britain, Greece, Hong Kong, India, Indonesia, Japan, Kenya, Nigeria, Pakistan, Panama, Romania, Russia, Spain, Sri Lanka, Syria, Taiwan, Thailand, Turkey, U.S., and Zambia. Faculty come from China, Egypt, Germany, Greece, India, Iran, Korea, The Netherlands, and Turkey. The school also offers an Intercontinental MBA, giving graduate students the opportunity to study on four different continents over the course of 11 months.

== Student life ==
Both graduate students have the option of living on campus in Baumhart Hall, Loyola's downtown residence hall, located at the Water Tower Campus just off Michigan Avenue in the heart of the city. Students can also get involved with numerous clubs and organizations specific to their age and major. Graduate students can participate in many clubs, including the Graduate School Association, Graduate Marketing Association, Association of Loyola Entrepreneurs, Graduate School International Club, Human Resource Student Organization, and Graduate School Women in Business organization. Undergraduate students join many different organizations, including Delta Sigma Pi, Alpha Kappa Psi, or Beta Alpha Psi. Some of the annual social events for students include an international Thanksgiving potluck, a holiday party, and the MBA Cup tournament.

== The Michael R. Quinlan School of Business ==
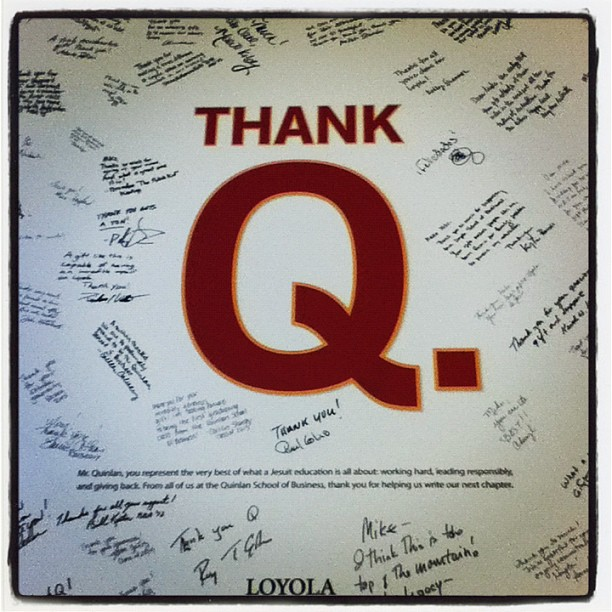
Thank Q Card

On June 2, 2012, Loyola University Chicago announced that alumnus Michael R. Quinlan had given its business school a gift of $40 million. In honor of this gift, Loyola's business school was renamed the Michael R. Quinlan School of Business. Michael R. Quinlan, double alumnus of Loyola University Chicago and former CEO of McDonald's Corporation, also serves as chairman of Loyola's Board of Trustees. The gift is to support the school and will go into building Loyola's business school endowment. A new facility for the business school is in the planning stages.

== Alumni ==
Approximately 28,000 Quinlan alumni work throughout the world—17,000 in Chicago alone. Companies represented by Loyola graduate school alumni include American Airlines, Baxter International, Boeing, Chase, Eli Lilly, Exelon, General Mills, Johnson & Johnson, Kraft Foods, McDonald's, Motorola, Pfizer, Sara Lee Corporation, U.S. Cellular, Verizon, and Walgreens.

Notable Loyola business alumni:

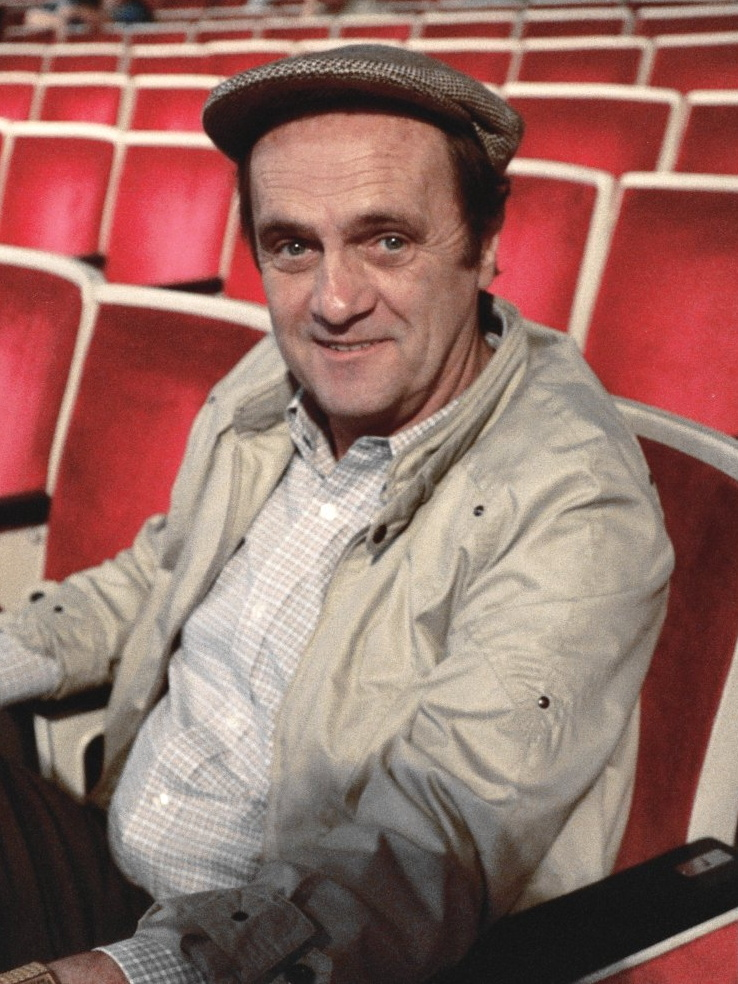
Actor Bob Newhart.

- Michael R. Quinlan, McDonald's Corporation former chairman and CEO; chairman of Loyola University Chicago's Board of Trustees; namesake of the Quinlan School of Business
- Brenda C. Barnes, Sara Lee Corporation, former chairman, CEO; first female COO of PepsiCo
- Joseph M. Juran, (1935), quality expert
- Thomas Schoewe, Walmart Stores, Inc., executive vice president and CFO
- Stephen McGowan, former CFO Sun Microsystems
- George Halas Jr., former president/owner of the Chicago Bears
- John York, co-owner of the San Francisco 49ers
- John E. Rooney, former CEO US Cellular
- Bob Newhart, legendary actor/comedian (majored in accounting)

== Admission process ==
Admission to Quinlan's graduate program is competitive. The process requires various steps through an online application. Students may apply to begin classes during any of Quinlan's four terms (fall, winter, spring, summer).
