= Ed McCaskey =

American football executive (1919–2003)

- Ed McCaskey
- Born: Edward W. McCaskey; April 27, 1919; Lancaster, Pennsylvania, U.S.
- Died: April 8, 2003 (aged 83); Des Plaines, Illinois, U.S.
- Education: University of Pennsylvania
- Spouse: Virginia Halas (m. 1943)
- Children: 11, including Michael and George McCaskey
- Football career

Profile
- Position: Executive

Career history
- Chicago Bears (1967–1982) Vice President & Treasurer; Chicago Bears (1983–2003) Chairman

Awards and highlights
- Super Bowl champion (XX)

Edward W. McCaskey (April 27, 1919 – April 8, 2003) was an American football executive who was the chairman of the Chicago Bears. The husband of Bears principal owner Virginia Halas McCaskey, he also served as vice president and treasurer for the team.

== Military career ==
Upon graduating from the University of Pennsylvania, McCaskey served in the 80th Division of the United States Army during World War II for two-and-a-half years. Though he was later injured, he refused the Purple Heart, and was subsequently awarded the Bronze Star Medal and a combat infantry badge.

== Personal life ==
After the war, McCaskey became a salesman and a singer in a band. He attempted to join the Harry James Band but lost out to Frank Sinatra.

In 1943, he married Virginia Halas, daughter of Bears founder, owner and head coach George Halas. The older Halas expressed his doubts about McCaskey, so he sent two "agents", Bert Bell and Art Rooney, owners of the Philadelphia Eagles and Pittsburgh Steelers, respectively, to inspect him.

== Chairman of the Board ==
In 1967, McCaskey became vice president and treasurer of the Bears. When George Halas died in 1983, Virginia became principal owner and Ed became chairman of the board with their son Michael as team president. The following year, McCaskey made his son operating head of the franchise. In 1999, McCaskey relinquished his position as chairman of the board to Michael, who was promoted after various incidents occurred such as the botched hiring of Dave Wannstedt's replacement and failed attempt to get a new stadium.

"I got to be a big shot with the Bears through some clever planning. George Halas had two children, Mugs and Virginia. I took one look at Mugs and I married Virginia, and that's how I got this job. But Coach (Halas) still waited 25 years before he hired me, because he wanted to make sure the marriage was secure."

— Ed McCaskey

On January 11, 1970, in a New Orleans hotel ballroom just before Super Bowl IV, the Bears and Pittsburgh Steelers were tied with the worst record in the NFL in 1969, both going 1-13, a coin toss ceremony was held by NFL Commissioner Pete Rozelle to settle who would get first pick in the next draft. McCaskey, as the Bears' representative, called heads and it was tails and the Steelers took future Hall of Fame quarterback Terry Bradshaw out of Louisiana Tech, who later led the Steelers to four Super Bowl championships. Following his incorrect call, former Chicago sportswriter Jack Griffin hollered from the back of the room “McCaskey, you’re a bum!” “You couldn’t even win a coin flip!”.

=== Relationship with Brian Piccolo ===
The summer before McCaskey officially joined the Bears, he befriended the Bears player Brian Piccolo. The two remained close friends until Piccolo's death of cancer in 1970. As the story goes, he was the person behind the idea to put Piccolo and Gale Sayers in the same room – the first interracial roommates in team history. Bears owner George Halas assigned McCaskey, who already was close friends with Piccolo, to be at the side of Brian and his family during the cancer treatments.

After Piccolo's death, McCaskey wrote the famous speech that was immortalized in the movie Brian's Song: "I love Brian Piccolo and I'd like all of you to love him too. Tonight when you hit your knees, please ask God to love him." He was also a longtime contributor to the Brian Piccolo Cancer Research Fund. McCaskey organized the first golf outing to raise money for the Fund.

== Death ==
On April 8, 2003, McCaskey died in his Des Plaines, Illinois home; he had been in declining health, and was survived by his wife and eleven children. At his funeral, a "plaintive piano rendition" of the Bears fight song "Bear Down, Chicago Bears" was played. McCaskey left a lasting impact on the Bears, such as befriending Brian Piccolo, and placing him with Gale Sayers in the same room, making them the first interracial roommates. McCaskey wrote a speech dedicated to Piccolo that was recited by Sayers after being awarded the George S. Halas Courage Award, which was later memorialized in the film Brian's Song, which McCaskey was a consultant for.

To honor McCaskey during the 2003 season, the Bears added an orange shamrock-shaped patch to their jerseys with his initials "EWM".
