= John E. Rooney (businessman) =

American businessman (1942–2011)

John E. "Jack" Rooney (1942 – July 22, 2011) was an American businessman and the president and chief executive officer of U.S. Cellular.

== Life and career ==
Rooney was born and grew up in the South Side of Chicago. He graduated from John Carroll University in Ohio with a bachelor's degree in business administration and an MBA in finance from Loyola University Chicago.

Rooney held executive positions with Firestone Tire and Rubber Company, Pullman Inc., and the Federal Reserve Bank of Chicago before spending nine years working for Ameritech Corporation. He was vice president/treasurer of Ameritech Cellular Services from 1990 to 1992, president of Ameritech Cellular Services from 1992 to 1997, and president of Ameritech Consumer Services from 1997 to 1999. He joined U.S. Cellular as president and CEO in April 2000.

Rooney was a member of the board of trustees of Loyola University Chicago as well as a member of the board of advisors of the Loyola University Chicago School of Business Administration. In addition to serving as a member of the board of directors of U.S. Cellular Corporation, Rooney also served on the President's Board of Uhlich Children's Advantage Network; the board of directors for the Chicago Children's Advocacy Center; and the Cellular Telecommunications and Internet Association's board of directors. Additionally, Chicago Mayor Richard M. Daley appointed Rooney to the Mayor's Council of Technology Advisors and the board of World Business Chicago.

He was married to his wife Germaine for 44 years until her death in early 2010. They had three children and nine grandchildren.

Rooney stepped down as president/CEO of U.S. Cellular in 2010. He died on July 22, 2011, after suffering a stroke earlier that week.
