= Hinshaw & Culbertson =

Chicago-based Law Firm

Hinshaw & Culbertson is a law firm based in Chicago, United States. It was established in 1934 by Joseph Howard Hinshaw and James G. Culbertson.

== History ==
=== Origins ===
In 1934, after saving up $300, Joseph Howard Hinshaw, a World War I veteran and well-known trial lawyer, established his own law firm in partnership with James G. Culbertson, a banking and corporate transactional lawyer referred by Clarence Darrow. They set up a business on LaSalle Street in Chicago called "Hinshaw & Culbertson."

=== Hinshaw, Culbertson, Moelmann, Hoban & Fuller ===
By the mid-1980s, the firm had established groups specializing in appeals, corporate law, health care law, insurance coverage, labour and employment law, legal malpractice, medical malpractice, products liability, and real estate. During this time, the firm began its expansion beyond the Midwest, opening an office in Miami, Florida. Between 1980 and 1993, the firm had five name partners and was known as "Hinshaw, Culbertson, Moelmann, Hoban & Fuller." One of the newer partners was John M. Moelmann, who focused on the area of medical malpractice.

George S. Hoban, the fourth name partner of the firm, became the firm's most prominent corporate attorney. He first began his practice with Hinshaw in 1938 and eventually became a managing partner of the firm, retiring in 1979.

The fifth name partner, Perry Fuller, was a protégé of Hinshaw. He argued cases before the Illinois and United States Supreme Courts, among many other trial and appellate courts.

Hoban's efforts toward growing the firm were continued and expanded upon by Dennis M. Horan. Following Horan's passing in 1988, Donald L. Mrozek began his tenure as chairman. Under Mrozek's stewardship, the firm expanded its practice areas and began representing a higher calibre of clients. Mrozek oversaw the firm's expansion from a handful of states to 12, including New York, Massachusetts, Rhode Island, and California.

=== Hinshaw & Culbertson LLP ===
In 2004, the firm established itself as a limited liability partnership and the firm's name was reverted to "Hinshaw & Culbertson LLP."

In time, the firm grew to one of the most notable in the United States (NLJ 250), ranking in the top 200 list of profitable firms in the country (the AmLaw 200). The firm began providing regular counsel to Fortune 500 companies and advising state and local governments, and participated in several high-profile cases that helped establish legal precedents.

In January 2014, the attorneys comprising the Portland, Oregon office of Hinshaw left to join the international firm Holland & Knight, establishing that firm's first professional ethics practice group.

In October, 2014, Hinshaw announced a merger with Barger & Wolen LLP, a prominent, California-based insurance and regulatory firm. The merger lifted Hinshaw's insurance, reinsurance, and government regulatory practices to among the country's most profitable. It also represented the firm's entry into international law practice, with the addition of an office in London. Retaining the Hinshaw & Culbertson LLP name, the firm continued building on its insurance and reinsurance services practice group. The firm also added a team of coverage litigators from Meckler Bulger Tilson following the merger of MBT and Cozen O'Connor in April 2015.

On June 1, 2015, Donald L. Mrozek stepped down as Chairman of Hinshaw. He was succeeded by Kevin Joseph Burke, litigation partner and former Vice Chairman of the firm. This was the first change to Hinshaw's leadership in nearly three decades. It was accompanied by changes in the nationwide management committee and practice groups leadership, a strategy rarely seen absent a partnership vote in similarly sized law firms.

In February 2019, Hinshaw announced Chicago-based partner Peter D. Sullivan as the firm's new chairman.
