= George Halas Jr. =

American football executive (1925–1979)

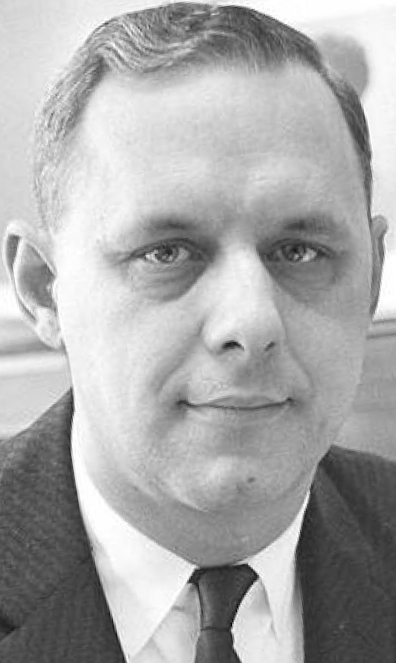
- Halas Jr. in 1963
- Born: George Stanley Halas Jr. September 4, 1925; Chicago, Illinois, U.S.
- Died: December 16, 1979 (aged 54); Chicago, Illinois, U.S.
- Other name: Mugs
- Education: Loyola University Chicago (1949)
- Spouses: Therese Halas (m. 1963; div. 1975) Patricia Halas (m. 1978)
- Children: 2
- Parent: George Halas (father)
- Relatives: Virginia Halas McCaskey (sister); George McCaskey (nephew); Michael McCaskey (nephew)
- Football career

Career history
- Chicago Bears (1953–1962) Treasurer; Chicago Bears (1963–1979) President

Awards and highlights
- As executive: NFL champion (1963)
- Executive profile at Pro Football Reference

George Stanley "Mugs" Halas Jr. (September 4, 1925 – December 16, 1979) was an American football executive who was one of five presidents in the history of the Chicago Bears franchise of the National Football League (NFL).

== Early life ==
Mugs was the son of Bears founder and NFL co-founder George Halas and Minnie Bushing. He was born at St. Anthony's Hospital on Chicago's West Side. He attended Saint Hilary School and later high school at Loyola Academy. Mugs was active within the Bears organization from a young age. He was the team's water boy and helped organize equipment during his youth.

Mugs joined the United States Navy Reserve during World War II in 1944. He attended Loyola University Chicago and graduated from their School of Business in 1949.

== Executive career ==
Mugs joined the Bears' front office in 1950. He became treasurer in 1953 and president of the club in 1963. He also nominally served as general manager until 1974, though his father continued to have the final say on football matters during this time. In contrast to his father, Mugs brought in external coaches and executives to help manage the Bears' football and business operations. He hired Jerry Vainisi in 1972, who rose through the Bears' ranks to become a general manager. Vainisi also became a close confidant to both Mugs and his father. In 1974, Mugs convinced his father to hire Jim Finks as the team's new general manager. Mugs also hired Jim Parmer as a scout, who worked with Finks to acquire many of the players on the 1985 Chicago Bears team that won Super Bowl XX.

In 1978, Mugs threatened to leave Soldier Field after the Chicago Park District failed to address many of the Bears' needs and concerns. He proposed building a new stadium in Arlington Heights, Illinois, an idea that was later revisited in 2021.

The Bears compiled a record of 105–131–6 (.446) with Mugs as president, which included a championship in 1963, and two other playoff berths.

== Personal life ==
Mugs married to Therese in 1963 and had two children, Christine and Stephen. Therese divorced Mugs in 1975 and was awarded custody of their children, the family home, $50,000, and four season tickets to Chicago Bears games. In 1978, Mugs married his second wife, Patricia, with whom he lived until his death in 1979. They resided at Water Tower Place. Mugs also served on the board of directors for the Park National Bank, Chicago Association of Retarded Children, United Cerebral Palsy, and was a trustee of the Pop Warner Football League.

== Death and legacy ==
Mugs died on the early morning of December 16, 1979, the last day of the 1979 regular season from a sudden heart attack. He was interred at All Saints Cemetery in Des Plaines, Illinois.

Charles Bidwill Jr., then the co-owner of the St. Louis Cardinals, reported Mugs was well-respected among the other owners in the NFL. Jim Finks, the Bears' general manager, considered Mugs to be one of the smartest owners in the league. Chicago Tribune writer Don Pierson credits Mugs for developing the NFL's parity-plan scheduling formula, which saw rotating intra-division play based on team's finish from the prior season.

George Sr. intended for Mugs to inherit the team upon his death. Upon George Sr.'s death in 1983, Mugs' older sister, Virginia Halas McCaskey, inherited the team. Both Vainisi and NFL Hall of Famer Dan Hampton reported that George Sr. had never wanted the McCaskeys to control the team. Charles Brizzolara, a Chicago businessman and Bears board member, claimed that Mugs intended for Stephen to succeed him as Bears president to keep franchise within the Halas family.

A legal battle subsequently brewed between Mugs' heirs and the Halas-McCaskey family over their inheritance, life insurance payout, and ownership stake. In August 1987, Virginia followed the will and testament of George Sr. to restructure the franchise's ownership to mitigate the impact of his estate tax and lower income taxes on skybox rental income at Soldier Field. The ensuing reorganization resulted in Mugs' heirs having their 30.5% stake in the franchise converted and reclassified to 19.67%, while also losing their seat on the Bears' board. Christine and Stephen unsuccessfully sued Virginia to block the reorganization, alleging she intentionally damaged the value of their stocks through the reorganization and to recover $2.5 million in damages. A Cook County judge determined that Virginia did not damage Christine and Stephen's stocks, but reprimanded her for not disclosing plans of the reorganization to them sooner.

At the same time, Therese and her children claimed that Mugs was the victim of a wrongful death. His life insurance policies included a double indemnity clause, which would have doubled the payout if his death was deemed accidental or wrongful. Mugs' body was exhumed and a second autopsy at the request of Therese and her children was performed. The forensic pathologist conducting the autopsy noted that many of Mugs' internal organs, including his heart, lungs, and spinal cord, had been replaced with sawdust. Medical professionals at the time typically disposed of organs after examination in all cases except those suspected of homicide. The three filed a lawsuit seeking $50-$100 million in damages from multiple parties, including the Chicago Police, Cook County Medical Examiner's office, the Bears, the NFL, and Pete Rozelle. A judge ruled against the Halas family's request to obtain written statements from 15 individuals who were involved in Mugs' autopsy, effectively ending the lawsuit.

In 1988, Christine and Stephen attempted to sell their 19.67% equity in the Bears to Judd Malkin and Neil Bluhm of JMB Realty. However, the McCaskey family wished to keep the Bears within the family. They exercised their right of first refusal and matched Malkin and Bluhm's offer at the last minute. Christine and Stephen filed an unsuccessful lawsuit to block the McCaskeys' acquisition, contending that their stake's fair market value was substantially higher than the $17 million purchase price the McCaskeys and JMB had agreed upon. Stephen expressed disdain in selling his stake to the McCaskeys, commenting, "I don't consider myself part of the family since my grandfather died. Not one member of the McCaskeys called to tell me or my sister that he (George Sr.) had died. I found it out on the news... I haven't talked to any of them since my father died." The McCaskey family later sold the stake to Chicago-area entrepreneurs Andrew J. McKenna and Patrick Ryan in 1990.

George Sr. dedicated the original Halas Hall to Mugs in 1979. However, the facility was eventually vacated and subsequently transferred to Lake Forest College in 1997. The main auditorium at the current Halas Hall was named after Mugs. The George Halas Jr. Sports Center was dedicated on September 2, 1982, on the campus of Loyola University Chicago.
