= Michael McCaskey =

American football executive (1943–2020)

Personal information
- Born: December 11, 1943; Lancaster, Pennsylvania, U.S.
- Died: May 16, 2020 (aged 76); Chicago, Illinois, U.S.

Career information
- College: Case Western Reserve

Career history
- Chicago Bears (1983–1998) President; Chicago Bears (1999–2011) Chairman

Awards and highlights
- Super Bowl champion (XX)

Michael Benning McCaskey (December 11, 1943 – May 16, 2020) was an American sports executive who was the chairman of the Chicago Bears in the National Football League (NFL) from 1999 until 2011. He was the eldest son of the late Bears owner Virginia Halas McCaskey and grandson of team founder George Halas.

== Biography ==
McCaskey, son of former Bears principal owner Virginia Halas McCaskey and former Chicago Bears chairman Ed McCaskey, was the oldest grandchild of George Halas. He became president of the Bears in 1983 after Halas' death. McCaskey held that post until 1999, when he succeeded his father Ed as chairman of the board until 2011. He was the brother of current Bears Chairman George McCaskey.

McCaskey frequently clashed with Mike Ditka, who had been hired by Halas, but Ditka retained his job with an extension in 1984; the Bears won Super Bowl XX the following season, while McCaskey was named Sporting News executive of the year, the first Bears executive to receive the honor since Halas in 1956. McCaskey finally fired Ditka after a losing season in 1992. Ditka's replacement was McCaskey's first coaching hire, Dave Wannstedt, who was a heavily-sought-after candidate by several teams. However, after a 1994 playoff appearance, the Bears posted more losing seasons; Wannstedt was fired after the 1998 season and, after a botched hiring of Dave McGinnis, McCaskey was stripped of much of his operational responsibilities and limited to the position of chairman of the board.

McCaskey was an alumnus of the Weatherhead School of Management, at Case Western Reserve University. He served in the Peace Corps in Ethiopia and taught at the business schools at UCLA and Harvard University prior to becoming president of the Bears. McCaskey was also a member of the Yale College Class of 1965 and lettered in football there.

He died on May 16, 2020, after suffering from cancer "for a considerable time".
