= Kevin Warren =

American attorney and sports executive (born 1963)

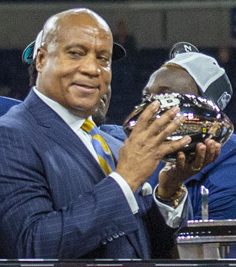
- Warren in 2022

Chicago Bears
- Title: President and chief executive officer

Personal information
- Born: November 17, 1963 (age 62); Phoenix, Arizona, U.S.

Career information
- College: University of Pennsylvania; Grand Canyon University (BS); Arizona State University (MBA); University of Notre Dame (JD)

Career history
- St. Louis Rams (1997–1999) Vice president of player programs & football legal counsel; St. Louis Rams (2000) Vice president of football administration; Detroit Lions (2001–2003) Senior vice president of business operations & general counsel; Minnesota Vikings (2005–2014) Executive vice president of legal affairs & chief administrative officer; Minnesota Vikings (2015–2019) Chief operating officer; Big Ten Conference (2020–2023) Commissioner; Chicago Bears (2023–present) President and chief executive officer

Awards and highlights
- Super Bowl champion (XXXIV)

Kevin Fulbright Warren (born November 17, 1963) is an American attorney and sports executive. He is the team president and chief executive officer (CEO) for the Chicago Bears of the National Football League (NFL). He was previously the commissioner of the Big Ten Conference from 2020 to 2023, overseeing negotiations for expansion of the conference.

Warren played basketball in college, then attended graduate business school and law school, beginning his career in law, sports agency, and player career management. He began his NFL front office career with the St. Louis Rams in 1997, and was an executive of the organization when it won Super Bowl XXXIV in 2000. In 2015, Warren became the first African-American chief operating officer (COO) of an NFL team, during the time he worked for the Minnesota Vikings.

== Early life ==
Warren was born on November 17, 1963, in Phoenix, Arizona. He became interested in sports at an early age, which he attributes to members of his family. His father, Morrison Warren Sr., played football for the Brooklyn Dodgers in 1948, and went on to be named president of the 1982 Fiesta Bowl Board of Directors, the first African-American to serve in this position for a major college bowl game. In 2013, Arizona State University (ASU) named Morrison Warren as one of the Top 50 ASU football players of all time. Kevin's eldest brother, Morrison Warren Jr., played football at Stanford in the early 1960s and was one of the first African-American scholarship student-athletes at Stanford.

As a young boy, Kevin was struck by a car and forced into traction and a body cast for many months. Doctors informed Warren that there was a chance he might not walk again, and therefore it was highly unlikely that he would ever fulfill any dreams he had of playing sports. A doctor told Kevin that aquatic rehabilitation exercises may be his only hope at recovery. Since there was not an easily accessible pool in Kevin's neighborhood, Kevin's family used the money from the insurance settlement received following the car accident to construct a pool in his backyard. Aided by his dedication to swimming, Warren recovered and went on to be recruited to play college basketball.

== Education ==
After graduating from Marcos De Niza High School, Warren entered the University of Pennsylvania in Philadelphia. The following year, he left Penn to attend Grand Canyon University, a Christian university in Arizona where he earned his undergraduate degree in Business Administration in 1986.

Following his graduation from Grand Canyon University, Warren attended Arizona State University where he earned his Master of Business Administration in 1988. He subsequently attended the University of Notre Dame Law School, where he earned his Juris Doctor in 1990. In November 2019, Warren was inducted into the 42nd annual W.P. Carey School of Business Alumni Hall of Fame at Arizona State University.

=== College basketball ===
Warren began his college basketball playing days at the University of Pennsylvania, where he was a member of the Quakers' 1981–82 Ivy League Championship team before playing for two years at GCU. At GCU, Warren scored 1,118 points and averaged 20.0 points per game, the fourth-best career scoring average in the school's history. In Warren's senior season of 1985–86, he averaged 23.3 points per game, which also ranks as the fourth-best season average in GCU basketball history. On November 17, 1984, Warren posted a 42-point performance against Concordia College. That performance is the fourth-highest single game scoring total in school history.

Warren earned GTE/CoSida Second Team Academic All-America honors as a senior, and added NAIA Academic All-America & NAIA District 7 Basketball Team honors as both a junior and senior. He posted a cumulative 3.49 GPA while at GCU. In March, 2012, Warren was honored as the 16th individual, and the fifth member from the university's basketball team, to be inducted into the Grand Canyon University Athletics Hall of Fame.

== Bar membership ==
Warren is licensed to practice law with the State Bars of Kansas and Michigan, and in Washington, D.C.

== Career ==
=== Bond, Schoeneck & King, PLLC. (1990–1991) ===
Warren began his law career at Bond, Schoeneck & King in Overland Park, Kansas (1990–91). As an associate there, he received his first exposure to sports law. The firm specialized in representing universities that were charged with NCAA violations. While at the firm, Warren worked with former Southeastern Conference Commissioner, Michael Slive, and collegiate sports attorney Mike Glazier on many high-profile cases.

=== Kevin F. Warren & Associates (1992–1997) ===
In 1991, while teaching a class at Notre Dame, Warren befriended All-American defensive lineman Chris Zorich. In 1992, Warren established his own sports and entertainment agency, Kevin Warren & Associates in Overland Park, Kansas, with Zorich becoming his first client. Warren also represented Hall of Fame Kansas City Chiefs offensive lineman Will Shields. During his time in Kansas City, Warren also served as an adjunct professor at the University of Missouri-Kansas City School of Law.

=== St. Louis Rams (1997–2001) ===
In 1997, Warren was hired by then St. Louis Rams head coach Dick Vermeil in a legal/front office position. Kevin Warren held the position of Vice President of Player Programs/Football Legal Counsel for the St. Louis Rams from 1997 to 2000 before his promotion to Vice President of Football Administration. Working closely with Vermeil, Warren gained insight into how football operations functioned. Warren credits this experience for providing him with priceless knowledge and credits Coach Vermeil for providing him his big break into the NFL. Warren earned a Super Bowl Ring with the Rams when they defeated the Tennessee Titans in Super Bowl XXXIV. Vermeil praised Warren in 2012 as being "as critical and important a part of [the] Rams Super Bowl Championship team as anybody in [the] organization."

=== Detroit Lions (2001–2003) ===
In 2001, Warren joined the Detroit Lions as the senior vice president of business operations and general counsel. During his stint with the Lions, Warren was recognized by Crain's Detroit Business on their "40 Under 40" list, which honored the top 40 Detroit business leaders under the age of 40.

=== Greenberg Traurig (2003–2005) ===
Following his time with the Lions, Warren returned to Phoenix where he worked for the international law firm Greenberg Traurig. In this role Warren represented the Wilf family and Minnesota Vikings ownership group in what became a successful $600 million deal to purchase the Minnesota Vikings. Zygi Wilf and five partners purchased the Minnesota Vikings from Red McCombs in 2005. Forbes estimated the 2019 value of the franchise at US$2.7 billion.

=== Minnesota Vikings (2005–2019) ===
Warren represented the Vikings' new ownership group in their purchase of the team. The Vikings then hired Warren as their executive vice president of legal affairs and chief administrative officer in 2005. In 2007, NFL Commissioner, Roger Goodell appointed Warren to the NFL's working group on emergency planning. In September 2013, Warren was named a member of the NFL Committee on Workplace Diversity, which works to enhance and promote diversity at every level of the NFL.

In February 2015, Warren was promoted to the role of chief operating officer for the Vikings. As COO, he oversaw all aspects of the business operations of the franchise. He restructured the management of the organization, which included creating new senior leadership positions, overseeing administration and finance, human resources, legal, marketing and fan engagement, and sales and corporate sponsorships. Warren also served as a member of the Vikings' internal stadium development team and represented the team at NFL meetings.

As COO of the Minnesota Vikings, Warren oversaw the team's long-running quest for a new stadium, to be named U.S. Bank Stadium, the largest public/private construction project in Minnesota's history. Warren was instrumental in selecting designers, developers, legal advisors and the Vikings' interim location for play, TCF Bank Stadium, while their new $1.13 billion stadium was under construction. The Vikings began the 2016 NFL season in the new venue. Even before construction was completed, U.S. Bank Stadium was awarded Super Bowl LII.

During Warren's time with the Vikings, he assisted in community outreach and diversity efforts. In 2017, the team created the Minnesota Vikings Foundation, launched a women's platform called Vikings Women, and were the first NFL team to host an LGBTQ symposium in 2018.

Warren was also responsible for overseeing construction of the Vikings' new practice facility in Eagan, Twin Cities Orthopedic Performance Center, which opened in March 2018. The ribbon-cutting ceremony was held in June 2018 with attendees including NFL Commissioner Roger Goodell, Twin Cities Orthopedics CEO Troy Simonson, and Governor Mark Dayton. He was also responsible for negotiating the naming rights of the facility. The facility was the first phase of a planned 200-acre development that would also include offices, retail, residential, hospitality, and a conference center.

=== Big Ten Commissioner (2019–2023) ===
Kevin Warren was named Commissioner of the Big Ten Conference on June 4, 2019. Warren followed Jim Delany as the sixth Big Ten commissioner and was the first African-American leader of the Big Ten and also the first African-American leader of any of the Power Five conferences. He assumed Big Ten Commissioner-Elect duties in September 2019 and officially assumed the position of Commissioner in January 2020.

In August 2020, due to the COVID-19 pandemic, the conference voted to postpone all fall sports, including college football. In an open letter, Warren stood by the decision and said that the vote "will not be revisited." Amid pressure from coaches and players, the Big Ten reversed the delay in September 2020, and the 14 teams played a shortened season beginning October 23-24.

During Warren's tenure, it was announced that the Big Ten would expand by adding USC and UCLA as members starting with the 2024 season.

Warren also oversaw the Big Ten's announcement of a new seven-year media rights deal with NBC, Fox, and CBS, estimated to be worth at least $7 billion. Warren left the deal unfinished, leaving its official completion to his successor Tony Petitti.

=== Chicago Bears (2023–present) ===
On January 12, 2023, Warren was named the new team president and chief executive officer of the Chicago Bears. One of Warren's top priorities was the construction of a new stadium for the team. Before Warren officially took over the job in April 2023, the Bears finalized their purchase of land at the former Arlington Park horse race track in Arlington Heights, Illinois. Warren promised clarity on the stadium project by the end of 2024.

Throughout Warren's tenure with the Bears, additional locations have been floated for the stadium, including renewed talks with the city of Chicago and the addition of Hammond, Indiana as a possibility. As of June 2026, other than demolition at the Arlington Park site, the Bears have not made substantial progress on development at any proposed stadium sites. Though the team released a statement on June 5 indicating that the Chicago Bears Board of Directors "voted to advance our stadium development project in Hammond, Indiana," talks with Illinois lawmakers are likely to continue.

== Awards ==
Warren has won the Fritz Pollard Alliance Salute to Excellence Award following 4 different NFL seasons. The Twin Cities Business Journal recognized Warren as a Minority Business Leader in 2006 and honored him with the Corporate Counsel Award for Private Company-Large in 2015. In 2017, on the eve of Super Bowl LI, Warren was presented with the inaugural Texas Southern University Pioneer Award. In 2019, Warren received GENYOUth's Vanguard award presented by NFL Commissioner Roger Goodell and GENYOUth Founder Alexis Glick. Warren also received the Trailblazer Award at the Minnesota Sports Awards for his work with the Minnesota Vikings and his upcoming role as Big Ten commissioner. In December 2019, Warren was featured on the cover of Sports Business Journal alongside Serena Williams, LeBron James, and Adam Silver where he received the honor of "Best Hire" of the year.

== Board and committee memberships ==
His professional associations include: serving as a member of the board of directors of Grand Canyon Education, Inc. and the board of trustees of Blue Cross Blue Shield Minnesota. He is also member of the Notre Dame Law School Advisory Council. In March 2016, Warren was appointed by University of Minnesota President Eric W. Kaler to serve as a member of the selection committee for the role of athletic director. His civic roles include being on the General Board of the YMCA of the Twin Cities; the board of directors for the Page Education Foundation; the University of Minnesota's Medical Foundation Board of Directors, and U of M's Medicine and Health Board of Overseers. Warren is a life member of the Fiesta Bowl Board of Directors. In addition, Warren is a member of the 2016-2017 Board of Trustees for the Minneapolis Institute of Art. Warren previously served as a board member on the board of directors of Securian Financial Group.

== Philanthropy ==
In 2014, Warren and his wife Greta created Carolyn's Comforts, in conjunction with the University of Minnesota Children's Hospital, donating $1 million to honor the legacy of his sister Carolyn Elaine Warren-Knox who died of brain cancer in October 2014. Since the inception of Carolyn's Comforts, over 150 financial grants have been made to families in need.

Warren and his wife Greta have also "adopted" Lucy Craft Laney Community School in Minneapolis, Minnesota. For each of the past 5 years, the Warrens have donated thousands of backpacks filled with school supplies to the student body. Among the resources they have contributed are school supplies, school uniforms, and athletic uniforms.

== Personal life ==
Kevin Warren and his wife Greta were married in 1992. Greta holds a bachelor's degree from Kansas State University. Together, the couple have a daughter, Peri, and a son, Powers. Powers played football at IMG Academy and finished his career as a tight end at Michigan State, after transferring from Mississippi State following his graduation in May 2021. The family resides in the greater Chicago area. Warren is a Christian.
