= List of Clemson Tigers bowl games =

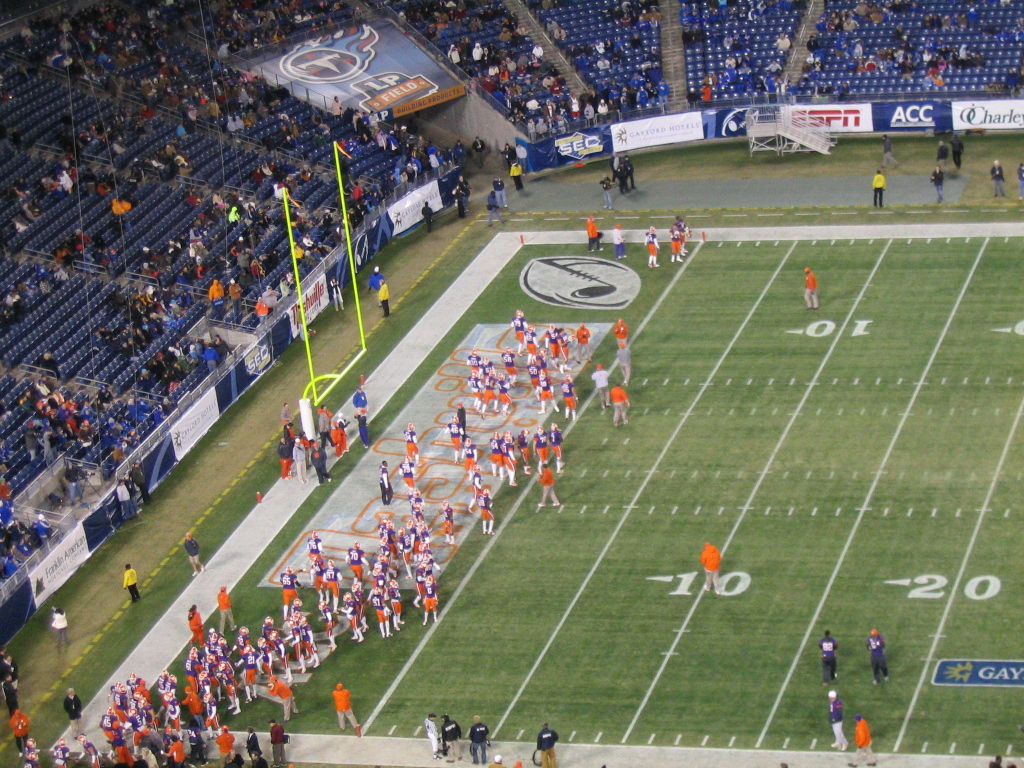
The Tigers take the field at the 2009 Music City Bowl.

The Clemson Tigers football team competes as part of the National Collegiate Athletic Association (NCAA) Division I Football Bowl Subdivision (FBS), representing Clemson University in the Atlantic Division of the Atlantic Coast Conference (ACC). Since the establishment of the team in 1896, Clemson has appeared in 52 bowl games. Included in these games are 9 combined appearances in the traditional "Big Four" bowl games (the Rose, Sugar, Cotton, and Orange).

== Key ==
General
†	Bowl game record attendance
‡	Former bowl game record attendance
^	Stadium record attendance
*	National championship game
^{1}	College Football Playoff

Results
W	Win
L	Loss

== Bowl games ==
List of bowl games showing bowl played in, score, date, season, opponent, stadium, location, attendance and head coach (Note: Statistics correct as of 2014–15 NCAA football bowl games.)
#	Season	Bowl	Score (Note: Results are sortable first by whether the result was an Clemson win, loss or tie and then second by the margin of victory.)	Date	Opponent (Note: Links to the season article for the opponent that Clemson competed against in the bowl for that year when available or to their general page when unavailable.)	Stadium	Location	Attnd.	Head coach
1	1939	1940 Cotton Bowl Classic	W 6–3	January 1, 1940	Boston College	Cotton Bowl	Dallas, TX	20,000	Jess Neely
2	1948	1949 Gator Bowl	W 24–23	January 1, 1949	Missouri	Gator Bowl Stadium	Jacksonville, FL	32,959^{‡}	Frank Howard
3	1950	1951 Orange Bowl	W 15–14	January 1, 1951	Miami (FL)	Burdine Stadium	Miami, FL	65,181^{‡}	Frank Howard
4	1951	1952 Gator Bowl	L 0–14	January 1, 1952	Miami (FL)	Gator Bowl Stadium	Jacksonville, FL	34,577^{‡}	Frank Howard
5	1956	1957 Orange Bowl	L 21–27	January 1, 1957	Colorado	Burdine Stadium	Miami, FL	73,280^{‡}	Frank Howard
6	1958	1959 Sugar Bowl	L 0–7	January 1, 1959	LSU	Tulane Stadium	New Orleans, LA	82,000	Frank Howard
7	1959	1959 Bluebonnet Bowl	W 23–7	December 19, 1959	TCU	Rice Stadium	Houston, TX	55,000^{‡}	Frank Howard
8	1977	1977 Gator Bowl	L 3–34	December 30, 1977	Pittsburgh	Gator Bowl Stadium	Jacksonville, FL	72,289^{‡}	Charley Pell
9	1978	1978 Gator Bowl	W 17–15	December 29, 1978	Ohio State	Gator Bowl Stadium	Jacksonville, FL	72,011	Danny Ford
10	1979	1979 Peach Bowl	L 18–24	December 31, 1979	Baylor	Fulton County Stadium	Atlanta, GA	57,371^{‡}	Danny Ford
11	1981	1982 Orange Bowl*	W 22–15	January 1, 1982	Nebraska	Miami Orange Bowl	Miami, FL	72,748	Danny Ford
12	1985	1985 Independence Bowl	L 13–20	December 21, 1985	Minnesota	Independence Stadium	Shreveport, LA	42,800	Danny Ford
13	1986	1986 Gator Bowl	W 27–21	December 27, 1986	Stanford	Gator Bowl Stadium	Jacksonville, FL	80,104	Danny Ford
14	1987	1988 Florida Citrus Bowl	W 35–10	January 1, 1988	Penn State	Citrus Bowl	Orlando, FL	53,152^{‡}	Danny Ford
15	1988	1989 Florida Citrus Bowl	W 13–6	January 1, 1989	Oklahoma	Citrus Bowl	Orlando, FL	53,571^{‡}	Danny Ford
16	1989	1989 Gator Bowl	W 27–7	December 30, 1989	West Virginia	Gator Bowl Stadium	Jacksonville, FL	82,911^{‡}	Danny Ford
17	1990	1991 Hall of Fame Bowl	W 30–0	January 1, 1991	Illinois	Tampa Stadium	Tampa, FL	63,154^{‡}	Ken Hatfield
18	1991	1992 Florida Citrus Bowl	L 14–37	January 1, 1992	California	Citrus Bowl	Orlando, FL	64,192	Ken Hatfield
19	1993	1993 Peach Bowl	W 14–13	December 31, 1993	Kentucky	Georgia Dome	Atlanta, GA	63,416	Tommy West
20	1995	1996 Gator Bowl	L 0–41	January 1, 1996	Syracuse	Jacksonville Municipal Stadium	Jacksonville, FL	45,202	Tommy West
21	1996	1996 Peach Bowl	L 7–10	December 28, 1996	LSU	Georgia Dome	Atlanta, GA	63,622	Tommy West
22	1997	1998 Peach Bowl	L 17–21	January 2, 1998	Auburn	Georgia Dome	Atlanta, GA	71,212^{‡}	Tommy West
23	1999	1999 Peach Bowl	L 7–17	December 30, 1999	Mississippi State	Georgia Dome	Atlanta, GA	73,315^{‡}	Tommy Bowden
24	2000	2001 Gator Bowl	L 20–41	January 1, 2001	Virginia Tech	Alltel Stadium	Jacksonville, FL	68,741	Tommy Bowden
25	2001	2001 Humanitarian Bowl	W 49–24	December 31, 2001	Louisiana Tech	Bronco Stadium	Boise, ID	23,427	Tommy Bowden
26	2002	2002 Tangerine Bowl	L 15–55	December 23, 2002	Texas Tech	Citrus Bowl	Orlando, FL	21,689	Tommy Bowden
27	2003	2004 Peach Bowl	W 27–14	January 2, 2004	Tennessee	Georgia Dome	Atlanta, GA	75,125^{‡}	Tommy Bowden
28	2005	2005 Champs Sports Bowl	W 19–10	December 27, 2005	Colorado	Citrus Bowl	Orlando, FL	31,470	Tommy Bowden
29	2006	2006 Music City Bowl	L 20–28	December 29, 2006	Kentucky	LP Field	Nashville, TN	68,024^{‡}	Tommy Bowden
30	2007	2007 Chick-fil-A Bowl	L 20–23 ^{OT}	December 31, 2007	Auburn	Georgia Dome	Atlanta, GA	74,413	Tommy Bowden
31	2008	2009 Gator Bowl	L 21–26	January 1, 2009	Nebraska	Jacksonville Municipal Stadium	Jacksonville, FL	67,282	Dabo Swinney
32	2009	2009 Music City Bowl	W 21–13	December 27, 2009	Kentucky	LP Field	Nashville, TN	57,280	Dabo Swinney
33	2010	2010 Meineke Car Care Bowl	L 26–31	December 31, 2010	South Florida	Bank of America Stadium	Charlotte, NC	41,122	Dabo Swinney
34	2011	2012 Orange Bowl	L 33–70	January 4, 2012	West Virginia	Sun Life Stadium	Miami Gardens, FL	67,563	Dabo Swinney
35	2012	2012 Chick-fil-A Bowl	W 25–24	December 31, 2012	LSU	Georgia Dome	Atlanta, GA	68,027	Dabo Swinney
36	2013	2014 Orange Bowl	W 40–35	January 3, 2014	Ohio State	Sun Life Stadium	Miami Gardens, FL	72,080	Dabo Swinney
37	2014	2014 Russell Athletic Bowl	W 40–6	December 29, 2014	Oklahoma	Orlando Citrus Bowl Stadium	Orlando, FL	40,071	Dabo Swinney
38	2015	2015 Orange Bowl^{1}	W 37–17	December 31, 2015	Oklahoma	Sun Life Stadium	Miami Gardens, FL	67,615	Dabo Swinney
39	2015	2016 CFP National Championship*^{1}	L 40–45	January 11, 2016	Alabama	University of Phoenix Stadium	Glendale, AZ	75,765	Dabo Swinney
40	2016	2016 Fiesta Bowl^{1}	W 31–0	December 31, 2016	Ohio State	University of Phoenix Stadium	Glendale, AZ	70,236	Dabo Swinney
41	2016	2017 CFP National Championship*^{1}	W 35–31	January 9, 2017	Alabama	Raymond James Stadium	Tampa, FL	74,512^	Dabo Swinney
42	2017	2018 Sugar Bowl^{1}	L 6–24	January 1, 2018	Alabama	Mercedes-Benz Superdome	New Orleans, LA	72,360	Dabo Swinney
43	2018	2018 Cotton Bowl Classic^{1}	W 30–3	December 29, 2018	Notre Dame	AT&T Stadium	Dallas, TX	72,183	Dabo Swinney
44	2018	2019 CFP National Championship*^{1}	W 44–16	January 7, 2019	Alabama	Levi's Stadium	Santa Clara, CA	74,814	Dabo Swinney
45	2019	2019 Fiesta Bowl^{1}	W 29–23	December 28, 2019	Ohio State	State Farm Stadium	Glendale, AZ	71,330	Dabo Swinney
46	2019	2020 CFP National Championship*^{1}	L 25–42	January 13, 2020	LSU	Mercedes-Benz Superdome	New Orleans, LA	76,885	Dabo Swinney
47	2020	2021 Sugar Bowl^{1}	L 28–49	January 1, 2021	Ohio State	Mercedes-Benz Superdome	New Orleans, LA	3,000	Dabo Swinney
48	2021	2021 Cheez-It Bowl	W 20–13	December 29, 2021	Iowa State	Camping World Stadium	Orlando, FL	39,051	Dabo Swinney
49	2022	2022 Orange Bowl	L 14–31	December 30, 2022	Tennessee	Hard Rock Stadium	Miami Gardens, FL	63,912	Dabo Swinney
50	2023	2023 Gator Bowl	W 38–35	December 29, 2023	Kentucky	EverBank Stadium	Jacksonville, FL	40,132	Dabo Swinney
51	2024	2024–25 CFP (First Round)^{1}	L 24–38	December 21, 2024	Texas	Darrell K Royal–Texas Memorial Stadium	Austin, TX	101,150	Dabo Swinney
52	2025	2025 Pinstripe Bowl	L 10–22	December 27, 2025	Penn State	Yankee Stadium	Bronx, NY	41,101	Dabo Swinney
