= Billy Davis (linebacker) =

American football player (born 1961)

No. 55
- Position: Linebacker

Personal information
- Born: December 6, 1961 (age 64); Alexandria, Virginia, U.S.
- Listed height: 6 ft 4 in (1.93 m)
- Listed weight: 210 lb (95 kg)

Career information
- High school: Mount Vernon (Alexandria)
- College: Clemson (1980–1983)
- NFL draft: 1984: undrafted

Career history
- Denver Broncos (1984)*; St. Louis Cardinals (1984)
- * Offseason or practice squad member only

Awards and highlights
- National champion (1981)
- Stats at Pro Football Reference

William Henry Davis Jr. (born December 6, 1961) is an American former professional football player who was a linebacker for one season with the St. Louis Cardinals of the National Football League (NFL). He played college football at Clemson. He was also a member of the Denver Broncos.

== Early life ==
William Henry Davis Jr. was born on December 6, 1961, in Alexandria, Virginia. He attended Mount Vernon High School in Alexandria.

== College career ==
Davis was a four-year letterman for the Clemson Tigers from 1980 to 1983 as a defensive back. He returned 12 punts for 45 yards his freshman year in 1980. He totaled 31 punt returns for 217 yards while also intercepting two passes in 1981. His 31 punt returns were the most in the Atlantic Coast Conference that season. The 1981 Tigers were named consensus national champions. Davis recorded 24 punt returns for 160 yards, and three interceptions his junior year in 1982. As a senior in 1983, he returned 17 punts for 83 yards and also made two interceptions. He graduated with a Bachelor of Arts in sociology. He later served on the Clemson Club regional board of directors from the late 1990s to the early 2000s, and re-joined the board in 2021.

== Professional career ==
After going undrafted in the 1984 NFL draft, Davis signed with the Denver Broncos on May 2, 1984. He was released by the Broncos on July 20, 1984.

He was signed by the St. Louis Cardinals on December 5, 1984, and played in one game for the team during the 1984 season. He was released on August 26, 1985. He was listed as a linebacker while with the Cardinals.

== Post-football career ==
Davis earned postgraduate degrees from Johns Hopkins University and Harvard University. He was a special agent in the United States Secret Service for 27 years until retiring in 2015. He was the special agent in charge of the Vice Presidential Protective Division for Joe Biden.

He was on the board of directors for the Military Bowl from 2010 to 2018. He has also served as the director of executive and major event security for Samaritan’s Purse and the Billy Graham Evangelistic Association.
