= Jeff Bryant =

American football player (born 1960)

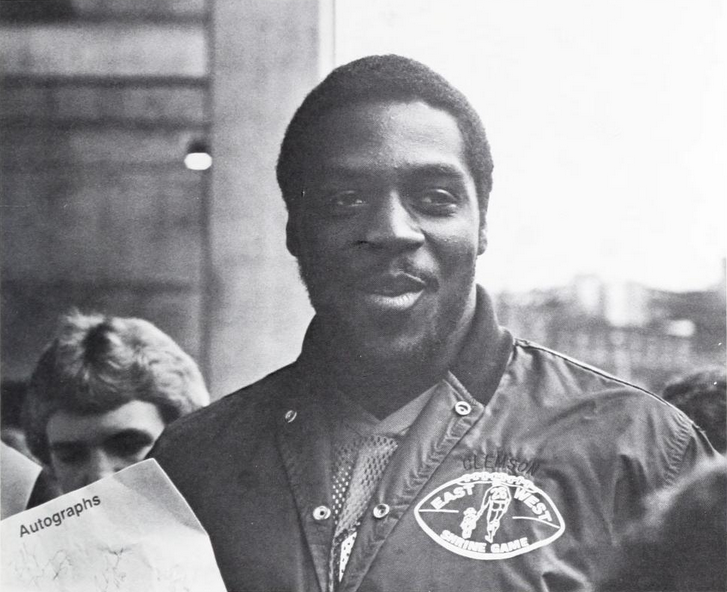
- Bryant at Clemson in 1982

No. 77
- Positions: Defensive tackle, defensive end

Personal information
- Born: May 22, 1960 (age 66); Atlanta, Georgia, U.S.
- Listed height: 6 ft 5 in (1.96 m)
- Listed weight: 270 lb (122 kg)

Career information
- High school: Decatur (GA) Gordon
- College: Clemson
- NFL draft: 1982: 1st round, 6th overall pick

Career history
- Seattle Seahawks (1982–1993)

Awards and highlights
- Seattle Seahawks Top 50 players; National champion (1981); First-team All-ACC (1981)

Career NFL statistics
- Sacks: 63
- Fumble recoveries: 11
- Interceptions: 1
- Stats at Pro Football Reference

Jeffrey Dwight Bryant (born May 22, 1960) is an American former professional football player who was a defensive end in the National Football League (NFL). Bryant played his entire 12-season career for the Seattle Seahawks. He played college football for the Clemson Tigers. He was selected sixth overall in the first round of the 1982 NFL Draft by the Seahawks.
