= Homer Jordan =

American gridiron football player (born 1960)

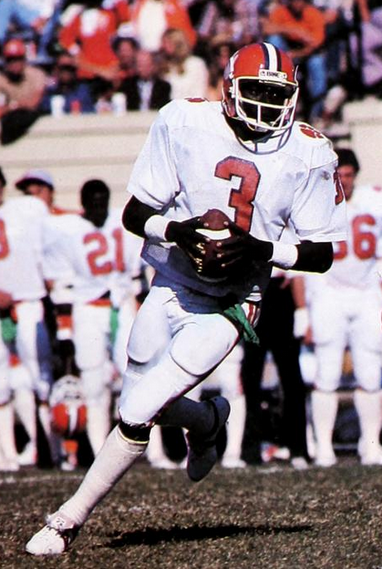
- Jordan at Clemson in 1981

Profile
- Position: Quarterback

Personal information
- Born: March 21, 1960 (age 66)
- Listed height: 6 ft 0 in (1.83 m)
- Listed weight: 183 lb (83 kg)

Career information
- College: Clemson
- NFL draft: 1983: undrafted

Career history
- Saskatchewan Roughriders (1983–1985); Winnipeg Blue Bombers (1986); Cleveland Browns (1987)

Awards and highlights
- National champion (1981); First-team All-ACC (1981)

Homer Jordan (born March 21, 1960) is an American former professional football player who was a quarterback in the Canadian Football League (CFL). He played college football for the Clemson Tigers, starting at quarterback for their 1981 national championship team. He played four seasons in the CFL and was a member of the Cleveland Browns of the National Football League (NFL) in 1987.

== Early life ==
Homer Jordan grew up in Athens, Georgia. His father died from diabetes when Jordan was 12, leaving behind Jordan, his mother and three sisters. Jordan played football, starring at quarterback and safety at Cedar Shoals High School in Athens. After earning All-State honors as a quarterback, Jordan signed with Clemson University as he wished to remain at the quarterback position in his college career.

== College career ==
Jordan attended Clemson University from 1979 to 1982 and was a pioneer of dual threat quarterbacks, with his ability to both pass and run. With Jordan as the starting quarterback in 1980, Clemson finished 6–5.

With Jordan quarterback for the 1981 Season, the Tigers began the season unranked. However, the team ran the table and finished the regular season with an 11–0 record and a #1 national ranking. Clemson won the National Championship by defeating the #4 ranked Nebraska Cornhusters 22–15 in the 1982 Orange Bowl on January 1, 1982. Jordan was named Orange Bowl Most Valuable Player, completing 11 of 22 passes and a touchdown. Jordan was an All-ACC selection that year, leading the ACC in passing efficiency.

Despite a knee injury and subsequent surgery in 1982, Jordan helped lead Clemson to a 9-1-1 season, a share of the ACC title and the #8 ranking. His final collegiate game was a 21–17 win over Wake Forest in the 1982 Mirage Bowl. Jordan finished his college career completing 250 of 479 passes for 3,643 yards with 15 touchdowns and 27 interceptions, rushing for 926 yards and 11 touchdowns in his three collegiate seasons.

== Professional career ==
After being drafted in the 1983 Territorial Draft by the Washington Federals of the USFL, Jordan played two seasons at QB for the Saskatchewan Roughriders of the Canadian Football League, signing a two-year contract on March 19, 1983. In 1984, Jordan completed 80 of 146 passes for 7 touchdowns and 10 interceptions and in 1985, Jordan completed 118 of 194 passes (60.8%), with 4 touchdowns and 8 interceptions. In his CFL career he rushed for 300 yards and four touchdowns. Jordan was a back-up quarterback for the Cleveland Browns in 1987, but did not attempt a pass.

== Coaching career and family ==
Having returned to his native Athens, Georgia, Jordan served as an assistant football coach at his alma mater Cedar Shoals High School for 10 seasons, beginning in 2002. His son, Darius Jordan, also played quarterback at Cedar Shoals High School in 2013 and 2014. Homer Jordan married his high school sweetheart, Deborah Arnold and still resides in Athens.

== Honors ==
In 1993, Jordan was inducted into the Clemson Athletic Hall of Fame, along with Bobby Conrad, Wayne Mass and Bill McLellan.

In 2000, Jordan was inducted into the Athens Athletic Hall of Fame.

On August 31, 2013, Jordan served as an Honorary Captain for the Clemson Tigers in their game against the Georgia Bulldogs at Memorial Stadium.
