= Bubba Diggs =

American football player and coach

- Occupation: Head coach

Bubba Diggs is currently the head coach for the Augusta Colts in the American Indoor Football Association (AIF). Mr. Diggs played for the Clemson Tigers, and helped win the 1981 championship with the Tigers. Bubba Diggs went 8–6 with the Augusta Spartans, taking down the Osceola Ghostriders in the Opening Round, and won over Columbus Lions in the World Indoor Bowl winning 63–60. Facing financial difficulties, the team is taking the 2010 season off.
