= Perry Tuttle =

American gridiron football player (born 1959)

No. 22, 81, 86
- Position: Wide receiver

Personal information
- Born: August 2, 1959 (age 67); Lexington, North Carolina, U.S.
- Listed height: 6 ft 0 in (1.83 m)
- Listed weight: 178 lb (81 kg)

Career information
- High school: North Davidson (Lexington)
- College: Clemson (1978–1981)
- NFL draft: 1982: 1st round, 19th overall pick

Career history
- Buffalo Bills (1982–1983); Atlanta Falcons (1984); Tampa Bay Buccaneers (1984); Winnipeg Blue Bombers (1986–1991)

Awards and highlights
- 2× Grey Cup champion (1988, 1990); National champion (1981); 2× First-team All-ACC (1980, 1981)

Career NFL statistics
- Receptions: 25
- Receiving yards: 375
- Receiving touchdowns: 3
- Stats at Pro Football Reference

Perry Warren Tuttle (born August 2, 1959) is an American former professional football player who was a wide receiver in the National Football League (NFL). He was a national champion and Clemson football standout in the early 1980s. His career continued into the NFL (Buffalo Bills, Tampa Bay Buccaneers, and Atlanta Falcons) and Canadian Football League (CFL) (Winnipeg Blue Bombers). Now, he is known for his inspirational speaking, sports marketing, and sports ministry.

== Early life ==
Perry Warren Tuttle was born on August 2, 1959, in Lexington, North Carolina, to Russell Samuel and Betty Mae Tuttle. He attended North Davidson High School in Lexington, and was a standout player throughout his high school football career. In 1975, he helped lead North Davidson to the Western North Carolina High School Activities Association (WNCHSAA) championship game, where they finished as co-champions, after tying with Shelby High School 21–21. Tuttle would continue his football career at Clemson University.

== College career ==
The prime of Tuttle's football career was during his three seasons (1978–1981) at Clemson University. As of the 2018 season, Tuttle ranks ninth all-time in school history for touchdown receptions with 17, sixth all-time for receiving yards with 2,534, and tenth all-time for receptions with 150. Tuttle caught the winning touchdown pass in the 1982 Orange Bowl, which secured the national championship for the Tigers. His celebration after the touchdown catch in the third quarter, arms outstretched above his head with ball in hand, made the cover of the January 11, 1982, edition of Sports Illustrated with the caption, “Orange Bowl Hero Perry Tuttle of Clemson.”

In 1991, Tuttle was inducted into the Clemson Athletic Hall of Fame, and in 1996, he was named as a member of Clemson's Centennial team. Later, in 1999, he was ranked by a panel of historians as the fourteenth-best player in Clemson football history.

== Professional career ==
On April 27, 1982, Tuttle was selected in the first round (19th overall) of the NFL draft by the Buffalo Bills. Tuttle spent two seasons with the Bills, producing 24 receptions for 368 yards and three touchdowns. After his two seasons with the Bills, his career in the NFL took a decline with the Atlanta Falcons; while in Atlanta, he only played in five games which led to minimal stat production, one reception for seven yards.

In 1986, Tuttle began his six-season career in the Canadian Football League with the Winnipeg Blue Bombers. Throughout his time with the Bombers, he caught 321 passes for 5,817 yards and 41 touchdowns. On November 25, 1990, at BC Place Stadium in Vancouver, the Bombers defeated the Edmonton Eskimos 50–11 to win the Grey Cup. In the third quarter of that game, Tuttle caught a 60-yard pass that later led to a five-yard touchdown catch. Two seasons after the Blue Bombers' championship win, Tuttle ended his football career and moved back to North Carolina. A few years after his retirement, Tuttle was inducted into the Winnipeg Blue Bomber Hall of Fame.

== Personal life ==
Tuttle's nephew Shy Tuttle plays in the NFL for the Washington Commanders as a defensive tackle.
