= Dan Benish =

American football player (born 1961)

No. 69, 95
- Position: Defensive tackle

Personal information
- Born: November 21, 1961 (age 64); Youngstown, Ohio, U.S.
- Listed height: 6 ft 5 in (1.96 m)
- Listed weight: 273 lb (124 kg)

Career information
- High school: Hubbard (OH)
- College: Clemson
- NFL draft: 1983: undrafted

Career history
- Atlanta Falcons (1983–1986); Miami Dolphins (1987)*; Tampa Bay Buccaneers (1987)*; Washington Redskins (1987–1988)
- * Offseason or practice squad member only

Awards and highlights
- Super Bowl champion (XXII); National champion (1981); First-team All-ACC (1981)

Career NFL statistics
- Sacks: 7.5
- Fumble recoveries: 2
- Stats at Pro Football Reference

Daniel James Benish (born November 21, 1961) is an American former professional football player who was a defensive tackle in the National Football League (NFL). He played college football for the Clemson Tigers. Benish played in the NFL for the Atlanta Falcons from 1983 to 1986 and for the Washington Redskins in 1987.
