= Da'Quan Bowers =

American football player and coach (born 1990)

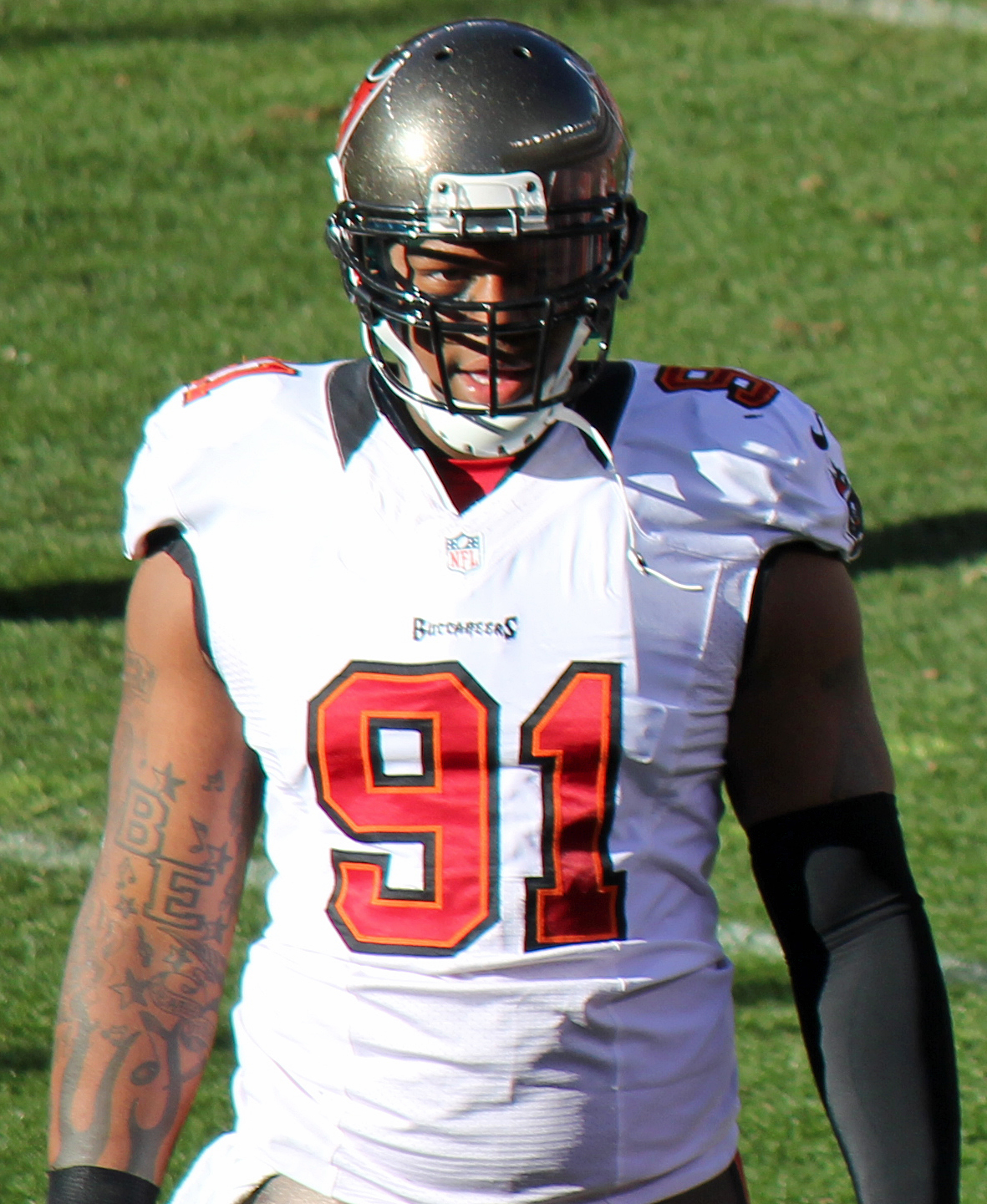
- Bowers with the Tampa Bay Buccaneers in 2012

No. 91
- Position: Defensive end

Personal information
- Born: February 23, 1990 (age 36); Bamberg, South Carolina, U.S.
- Listed height: 6 ft 4 in (1.93 m)
- Listed weight: 296 lb (134 kg)

Career information
- High school: Bamberg-Ehrhardt
- College: Clemson
- NFL draft: 2011: 2nd round, 51st overall pick

Career history

Playing
- Tampa Bay Buccaneers (2011–2015); Edmonton Eskimos (2017)

Coaching
- Clemson (2018–2019) Student assistant; South Florida (2020–2022) Defensive line coach

Awards and highlights
- As player: Bronko Nagurski Trophy (2010); Ted Hendricks Award (2010); Unanimous All-American (2010); ACC Defensive Player of the Year (2010); First-team All-ACC (2010); As coach: CFP national champion (2018)

Career NFL statistics
- Total tackles: 69
- Sacks: 7.0
- Fumble recoveries: 2
- Stats at Pro Football Reference
- Stats at CFL.ca

Da'Quan Bowers (born February 23, 1990) is an American former professional football player who was a defensive end in the National Football League (NFL) and Canadian Football League (CFL). He played college football for the Clemson Tigers, earning unanimous All-American honors and was selected by the Tampa Bay Buccaneers in the second round of the 2011 NFL draft. He was also a member of the CFL's Edmonton Eskimos.

== Early life ==
Bowers attended Bamberg-Ehrhardt High School in Bamberg, South Carolina, where he was a three-sport athlete in football and track. He played as a defensive end and running back for the Bamberg-Ehrhardt Red Raiders high school football team. As a senior in 2007, he led the team to an 11–2 record by recording 97 tackles, 33 tackles for loss and 14 sacks on defense, while on offense, he rushed for 1,219 yards and scored 19 touchdowns, he caught two touchdown passes, averaged 40 yards per kickoff return, and blocked seven kicks.

Bowers also starred in track & field as a shot putter (top-throw of 46–0.75 or 14.35m) and sprinter (11.7s 100m).

Bowers was ranked the No. 1 overall prospect by ESPN.com in 2008, the first Clemson recruit in history to be ranked as the number-one player in the nation by any recruiting service. Rivals.com dubbed Bowers the top defensive end prospect of the high school classes 2005–2009, describing him as "the closest thing to Reggie White and Bruce Smith". He chose Clemson over Florida State, Georgia, Notre Dame, Ohio State, Penn State, South Carolina, Tennessee, and Virginia Tech.

== College career ==
Bowers graduated early from high school and enrolled at Clemson University in January 2008, where he was a member of the Clemson Tigers football team from 2008 to 2010. He went through 2008 spring drills and had a game-high seven tackles in the 2008 Spring Game. As a true freshman in 2008, Bowers started six of 13 games, finishing the season with 37 tackles including eight for loss. During his second year in 2009, Bowers recorded 46 tackles, 10.5 for loss and three sacks, despite an injury that forced him to miss three games.

As a junior in 2010, Bowers recorded 67 tackles, 26 tackles for loss and 15.5 sacks. He led the nation in sacks and was tied for the most tackles for loss. Following the season, he was a first-team All-ACC selection, and was recognized as a unanimous first-team All-American. He was also honored as the ACC Defensive Player of the Year, and was the recipient of the Bronko Nagurski Trophy.

== Professional career ==
=== Pre-draft ===
As early as April 2010, Bowers was seen as a candidate for the No. 1 overall spot in the 2011 NFL draft. He remained at the top of most mock draft projections over the course of the season, especially after Stanford quarterback Andrew Luck, who was widely considered to be the No. 1 prospect for the 2011 draft, returned to school. Along with Nick Fairley, Marcell Dareus, and Patrick Peterson, Bowers was still listed among the best prospects available as of January 2011.

Pre-draft measurables
Height	Weight	Arm length	Hand span	Wingspan	40-yard dash	10-yard split	20-yard split	20-yard shuttle	Three-cone drill	Vertical jump	Broad jump	Bench press
6 ft 3 3/8 in (1.91 m)	280 lb (127 kg)	33 1/8 in (0.84 m)	10 1/4 in (0.26 m)	6 ft 7 1/4 in (2.01 m)	4.92 s	1.76 s	2.89 s	4.57 s	6.98 s	34.5 in (0.88 m)	9 ft 2 in (2.79 m)	22 reps
All values from NFL Combine/Clemson's Pro Day

=== Tampa Bay Buccaneers ===
Bowers was selected in the second round (51st overall) of the 2011 NFL draft by the Tampa Bay Buccaneers. Bowers was selected lower than expected due to medical issues, including off-season knee surgery. Bowers played in all 16 regular season games, starting in six, contributing 25 tackles. The following off-season, during the Bucs off-season program, he tore his Achilles tendon on May 10, 2012. Bowers was activated from the PUP on October 25, 2012. He played his first game of the 2012 season that same night against the Minnesota Vikings. He would finish his second season in the league having played in 10 games, but only amassing 13 tackles.

In the off-season Bowers was arrested for carrying an (unloaded) gun at LaGuardia Airport. The sentence was reduced on April 11, 2013. Bowers played only sparingly in 2013, and by the summer of 2014 there were serious doubts as to whether he would make the Buccaneers roster for the 2014 season. During that same off-season, Bowers was switched to a hybrid defensive end/defensive tackle. On October 21, 2014, Bowers was suspended two games by the NFL for using performance-enhancing substances. Bowers became a free agent that off-season, but was ultimately re-signed by the Buccaneers on July 27, 2015, for the 2015 training camp. Bowers was released by the Buccaneers on September 4, 2015. On December 15, 2015, Bowers re-signed with the Buccaneers. Bowers was not re-signed by the Buccaneers following the conclusion of the 2015 season. Throughout his entire Buccaneer career Bowers was often injured; earning him a place on the season-ending injury reserved list. In his five seasons in Tampa Bay Bowers played in 53 games, starting in 10 of them, contributing 69 tackles and 7 quarterback sacks.

=== Edmonton Eskimos ===
On May 11, 2017, Bowers signed with the Edmonton Eskimos of the Canadian Football League (CFL). Bowers played in 14 games for the Eskimos in 2017, contributing 17 defensive tackles, seven sacks, and one interception. In early March 2018 Bowers and the Eskimos agreed to a two-year contract extension.

=== Retirement ===
On May 20, 2018, Bowers announced his retirement from football.

== Coaching career ==
Following his retirement from football, Bowers joined the football staff at Clemson as a student assistant working with the defensive line while finishing his degree.

Bowers was named the defensive line coach at South Florida in 2020, joining former Clemson offensive coordinator Jeff Scott's inaugural staff.

== Personal life ==
Bowers was born in Bamberg, South Carolina to parents Dennis and Linda Bowers. His father, a gospel singer and guitarist with the Legendary Singing Stars, died on August 8, 2010, in Augusta, Georgia, at the age of 51. Da'Quan Bowers is also a member of The Legendary Singing Stars, occasionally singing lead and playing guitar.

As a child, Bowers looked up to Reggie White. Bowers grew up as a Dallas Cowboys fan and a Los Angeles Lakers fan.

On February 17, 2013, Bowers was arrested in New York City at La Guardia Airport on weapons charges after voluntarily turning over an unloaded .40-caliber handgun to security at LaGuardia Airport where he was traveling. The weapon was indeed permitted to carry but he was charged with second-degree criminal possession of a weapon. On April 11, 2013, the felony charge was dropped and Bowers pleaded guilty to disorderly conduct. He paid a $370 fine and his court record was sealed.
