= Terry Kinard =

American football player (born 1959)

No. 27, 43
- Position: Safety

Personal information
- Born: November 24, 1959 (age 66); Bitburg, West Germany
- Listed height: 6 ft 1 in (1.85 m)
- Listed weight: 200 lb (91 kg)

Career information
- High school: Sumter (Sumter, South Carolina, U.S.)
- College: Clemson (1978–1982)
- NFL draft: 1983: 1st round, 10th overall pick

Career history
- New York Giants (1983–1989); Houston Oilers (1990)

Awards and highlights
- Super Bowl champion (XXI); Pro Bowl (1988); PFWA All-Rookie Team (1983); 93rd greatest New York Giant of all-time; National champion (1981); Unanimous All-American (1982); Consensus All-American (1981); 2× First-team All-ACC (1981, 1982)

Career NFL statistics
- Interceptions: 31
- Sacks: 3
- Fumble recoveries: 7
- Stats at Pro Football Reference
- College Football Hall of Fame

Alfred Terance Kinard (born November 24, 1959) is an American former professional football player who was a safety for eight seasons in the National Football League (NFL) during the 1980s and 1990s. He played college football for the Clemson Tigers, and was a two-time consensus All-American. Kinard was selected in the first round of the 1983 NFL draft, and played professionally for the NFL's New York Giants and Houston Oilers. He won a Super Bowl with the Giants during the 1986 season.

== Early life ==
Kinard was born in Bitburg, West Germany. His father was stationed in the country, serving as a United States Air Force mechanic. Kinard attended Sumter High School in Sumter, South Carolina, graduating with the class of 1978.

== College career ==
Kinard attended Clemson University, where he played for the Clemson Tigers football team from 1979 to 1982. Kinard was a two-time consensus first-team All-American for two years in a row. He was the CBS National Defensive Player of the Year in 1982 and selected to the USA Today All-College Football Team in the 1980s. Kinard is the all-time Clemson leader in interceptions with seventeen and tackles by a defensive back with 294.

His college career did not start smoothly. He suffered a separated shoulder in his first game and was out the rest of the season. He later said that having to redshirt turned out to be a good thing, as he was not physically ready to compete as a freshman.

Kinard was inducted into the College Football Hall of Fame in 2001.

== Professional career ==
The New York Giants selected Kinard in the first round (tenth pick overall) of the 1983 NFL Draft, and he played for the Giants from 1983 to 1989. He played his eighth and final season for the Houston Oilers in 1990. In his eight NFL seasons, Kinard played in 121 games, started 115 of them, made thirty-one interceptions and recovered seven fumbles.

== Personal life ==
Kinard married his wife Cassandra on June 21, 2003. Their son Jaden was born in 2004. Well after post retirement from the NFL, he now teaches physical education at an elementary school in his hometown of Sumter South Carolina.
