= 1982 All-Atlantic Coast Conference football team =

American Football

The 1982 All-Atlantic Coast Conference football team consists of American football players chosen by various selectors for their All-Atlantic Coast Conference ("ACC") teams for the 1982 college football season. Selectors in 1982 included the Associated Press (AP).

== Offensive selections ==
=== Wide receivers ===
- Chris Castor, Duke (AP)
- Tim Ryan, Wake Forest (AP)

=== Tackles ===
- Robert Oxendine, Duke (AP)
- Dave Pacella, Maryland (AP)

=== Guards ===
- Dave Drechsler, North Carolina (AP)
- Ron Spruill, North Carolina (AP)

=== Centers ===
- Philip Ebinger, Duke (AP)

=== Tight ends ===
- Phil Denfeld, Wake Forest (AP)

=== Quarterbacks ===
- Ben Bennett, Duke (AP)

=== Running backs ===
- Cliff Austin, Clemson (AP)
- Robert Lavette, Georgia Tech (AP)

== Defensive selections ==
=== Defensive linemen ===
- William Fuller, North Carolina (AP)
- Mike Wilcher, North Carolina (AP)
- Mark Duda, Maryland (AP)

=== Linebackers ===
- Chris Ward, North Carolina (AP)
- William Perry, Clemson (AP)
- Andy Headen, Clemson (AP)
- Johnny Rembert, Clemson (AP)

=== Defensive backs ===
- Terry Kinard, Clemson (AP)
- Willie Harris, North Carolina (AP)
- Eric Williams, NC State (AP)
- Pat Chester, Virginia (AP)

== Special teams ==
=== Placekickers ===
- Jess Atkinson, Maryland (AP)

== Key ==
AP = Associated Press

== See also ==
1982 College Football All-America Team
