= 1985 Independence Bowl =

Minnesota Golden Gophers	Clemson Tigers
(6–5)	(6–5)
Big Ten	ACC
20	13
Head coach: John Gutekunst (interim)	Head coach: Danny Ford
	1	2	3	4	Total
Minnesota	3	7	3	7	20
Clemson	0	6	7	0	13
- Date: December 21, 1985
- Season: 1985
- Stadium: Independence Stadium
- Location: Shreveport, Louisiana
- MVP: QB Rickey Foggie; LB Bruce Holmes
- Referee: James Sprenger (Pac-10)
- Attendance: 42,845

United States TV coverage
- Network: Mizlou
- Announcers: Howard David; Bob Casciola; Steve Grad

The 1985 Independence Bowl was a college football postseason bowl game between the Clemson Tigers and the Minnesota Golden Gophers.

== Background ==
The Gophers finished in 6th place in the Big Ten Conference while the Tigers finished 4th in the Atlantic Coast Conference. This was the first Independence Bowl for either team. Gutekunst was the interim head coach after Lou Holtz left for Notre Dame. This was Minnesota's first bowl game since 1977 and Clemson's first since 1982.

== Game summary ==
Minnesota's Valdez Baylor scored on a 1-yard run in the fourth quarter to lead the Golden Gophers to the victory over Clemson, who committed four turnovers. Foggie went 9-of-12 for 123 yards and 60 yards rushing on 18 carries, en route to being named MVP. Valdez Baylor rushed for 98 yards on 12 carries. In a losing effort, Kenny Flowers ran for 148 yards on 27 carries.

== Aftermath ==
Gutekunst would become the full-time head coach for Minnesota starting the following year, which culminated in an appearance in the Liberty Bowl, their last appearance for 13 years. Clemson kept rolling, making four more bowl games in the decade. Neither team has returned to the Independence Bowl since this game.

== Statistics ==
Statistics	Minnesota	Clemson
First downs	19	18
Rushing yards	257	211
Passing yards	123	162
Interceptions	0	1
Total yards	380	373
Fumbles–lost	1–1	5–3
Penalties–yards	6–50	5–51
Punts–average	6–37.5	4–41.5
