= John Gutekunst =

American football player and coach (born 1944)

Biographical details
- Born: April 13, 1944 (age 82); Sellersville, Pennsylvania, U.S.

Playing career
- 1963–1966: Duke
- Position: Defensive back

Coaching career (HC unless noted)
- 1967: Duke (assistant freshmen)
- 1968–1969: Duke (assistant OL)
- 1970–1971: Duke (freshmen)
- 1972: Duke (DE)
- 1973–1974: Duke (LB)
- 1975: Duke (OL)
- 1976: Duke (DC)
- 1977–1978: Duke (DC/DB)
- 1979–1980: Virginia Tech (DE)
- 1981–1983: Virginia Tech (DC/DE)
- 1984–1985: Minnesota (DC)
- 1985–1991: Minnesota
- 1992: Tampa Bay Storm (OL/DL)
- 1992: Wake Forest (DB)
- 1993: South Carolina (OLB)
- 1994–1995: Rutgers (DC/DB)
- 1996–1997: New York CityHawks (DFO)
- 1998: Rhode Island (DB/K)
- 1999–2003: South Carolina (DB)
- 2004: North Carolina (co-DC/LB)
- 2005–2006: North Carolina (AHC/TE)
- 2007: Duke (DB)
- 2009: East Carolina (ST)
- 2010–2011: Columbia (DB)
- 2013: North Carolina A&T (ILB)
- 2017: East Carolina (def. analyst)

Head coaching record
- Overall: 29–37–2
- Bowls: 1–1

Accomplishments and honors

Awards
- AFCA Assistant Coach of the Year Award (2000)

John Gutekunst (born April 13, 1944) is an American former college football coach and player. He served as the head football coach at the University of Minnesota from 1985 to 1991, compiling a record of 29–37–2. Gutekunst came to Minnesota in 1984 as an assistant coach and took over as interim head coach in 1985 for the Independence Bowl after Lou Holtz left the team to become the head coach at Notre Dame. Gutekunst was promoted to head coach before the next season. He has also served as an assistant coach at Duke University, Virginia Polytechnic Institute and State University, Wake Forest University, Rutgers University, the University of Rhode Island, the University of South Carolina, the University of North Carolina at Chapel Hill, and East Carolina University. He joined the East Carolina staff in October 2009, taking over for Rock Roggeman, who left on indefinite medical leave. Gutekunst is an alumnus of Duke University, where he played football and baseball. He now is the head ranger at Willbrook Plantation Golf Course in Pawleys Island, SC.

His son, Brian Gutekunst, is the general manager of the Green Bay Packers.

== Head coaching record ==
Year	Team	Overall	Conference	Standing	Bowl/playoffs
Minnesota Golden Gophers (Big Ten Conference) (1985–1991)
1985	Minnesota	1–0*			W Independence
1986	Minnesota	6–6	5–3	T–3rd	L Liberty
1987	Minnesota	6–5	3–5	T–6th	
1988	Minnesota	2–7–2	0–6–2	T–9th	
1989	Minnesota	6–5	4–4	5th	
1990	Minnesota	6–5	5–3	6th	
1991	Minnesota	2–9	1–7	10th	
Minnesota:		29–37–2	18–28–2	*Lou Holtz coached the first 11 games of the season.	
Total:		29–37–2			
