= Donald Igwebuike =

Nigerian gridiron football player (born 1960)

No. 1, 4
- Position: Placekicker

Personal information
- Born: December 27, 1960 (age 65); Enugu, Nigeria
- Listed height: 5 ft 10 in (1.78 m)
- Listed weight: 184 lb (83 kg)

Career information
- College: Clemson
- NFL draft: 1985: 10th round, 260th overall pick

Career history
- Tampa Bay Buccaneers (1985–1989); Minnesota Vikings (1990); Tampa Bay Storm (1992); Baltimore Stallions (1994); Memphis Mad Dogs (1995)

Awards and highlights
- National champion (1981); Third-team All-American (1984); First-team All-ACC (1984)

Career NFL statistics
- Field goals Made: 108
- Field goals Attempted: 143
- Field goal %: 75.5
- PAT Made: 153
- PAT Attempted: 160
- PAT %: 95.6
- Stats at Pro Football Reference

Career AFL statistics
- Field goals Made: 0
- Field goals Attempted: 3
- PAT Made: 8
- PAT Attempted: 13
- Stats at ArenaFan.com

Donald Amechi Igwebuike // (born December 27, 1960) is a Nigerian former professional player of American football who was a kicker in the National Football League (NFL) for the Tampa Bay Buccaneers from 1985 to 1989. He was selected by the Buccaneers in the tenth round of the 1985 NFL draft. He is the seventh place all-time scorer for the Buccaneers with 416 overall points. Often kicking barefoot, Igwebuike also played for the 1990 Minnesota Vikings and in the Canadian Football League (CFL) with the Baltimore Stallions in 1994 and the Memphis Mad Dogs in 1995. Earlier, he attended Clemson University and was brought on as the kicker for the football team on the recommendation of his childhood friend and graduating Clemson kicker Obed Ariri. He agreed to join the team as long as he could continue playing for the soccer team, and took a football scholarship to save the soccer team a slot. His first attempt, a 52-yarder, was during the first American football game he had ever attended. He started as the kicker for the Tigers' 1981 national championship team.

In November 1990, Igwebuike was indicted by a federal grand jury on felony charges that he assisted a $1 million heroin smuggling plot. He was acquitted in April 1991.

== Personal life ==
Igwebuike is a first cousin, once removed to Pittsburgh Steelers running back Godwin Igwebuike.
