= Jeff Davis (American football) =

American football player (born 1960)

No. 58
- Position: Linebacker

Personal information
- Born: January 26, 1960 (age 66); Greensboro, North Carolina, U.S.
- Listed height: 6 ft 0 in (1.83 m)
- Listed weight: 230 lb (104 kg)

Career information
- High school: James B. Dudley (Greensboro, North Carolina)
- College: Clemson
- NFL draft: 1982: 5th round, 128th overall pick

Career history
- Tampa Bay Buccaneers (1982–1987)

Awards and highlights
- National champion (1981); Consensus All-American (1981); ACC Player of the Year (1981); First-team All-ACC (1981)

Career NFL statistics
- Sacks: 4
- Fumble recoveries: 7
- Interceptions: 3
- Stats at Pro Football Reference
- College Football Hall of Fame

Jeffrey Eugene Davis (born January 26, 1960) is an American former professional football player who was a linebacker in the National Football League (NFL) for six seasons during the 1980s. He played college football for Clemson University, and received All-American honors. He played professionally for the NFL's Tampa Bay Buccaneers.

== Early life ==
Davis was born in Greensboro, North Carolina.

== College career ==
Davis played college football for the Clemson Tigers. While there he set many records and helped Clemson defeat the Nebraska Cornhuskers in the 1982 Orange Bowl to win the National Championship. In his four years at Clemson from 1978 to 1981 he started 35 of 40 games, recording 469 tackles, four sacks, and four interceptions.

Davis was inducted into the College Football Hall of Fame in 2007.

== Professional career ==
The Tampa Bay Buccaneers chose Davis in the fifth round (128th pick overall) of the 1982 NFL draft, and he played for the Buccaneers from 1982 to 1987. He became a starter during his second season and led the team in tackles three times. He finished his career starting 72 of 83 games, and compiled 662 tackles, four sacks and three interceptions in his six-season pro career.

== Personal ==
Davis' twin sons J.D. and Judah were both linebackers at Clemson between 2015 and 2018.
