= Dave Drechsler =

American football player (born 1960)

No. 61
- Position: Guard

Personal information
- Born: July 18, 1960 (age 66); Bethesda, Maryland, U.S.
- Listed height: 6 ft 3 in (1.91 m)
- Listed weight: 264 lb (120 kg)

Career information
- High school: West Rowan (Mount Ulla, North Carolina)
- College: North Carolina
- NFL draft: 1983: 2nd round, 48th overall pick

Career history
- Green Bay Packers (1983–1984)

Awards and highlights
- 2× First-team All-American (1981, 1982); 2× First-team All-ACC (1981, 1982)

Career NFL statistics
- Games played: 32
- Games started: 15
- Stats at Pro Football Reference

Dave Drechsler (born July 18, 1960) is an American former professional football player who was a guard for two seasons with the Green Bay Packers of the National Football League (NFL). Drechsler was selected by the Packers in the second round of the 1983 NFL draft. He played college football for the North Carolina Tar Heels.

Drechsler played a total of 32 games over two seasons, all with the Green Bay Packers. In his rookie season, he started 12 games for the Packers, all at left guard.
