= 1981 All-Atlantic Coast Conference football team =

American college football all-star team

The 1981 All-Atlantic Coast Conference football team consists of American football players chosen by various selectors for their All-Atlantic Coast Conference ("ACC") teams for the 1981 college football season. Selectors in 1981 included the Associated Press (AP).

== Offensive selections ==
=== Wide receivers ===
- Perry Tuttle, Clemson (AP)
- Cedric Jones, Duke (AP)

=== Tackles ===
- Lee Nanney, Clemson (AP)
- Chris Koehne, NC State (AP)

=== Guards ===
- Dave Drechsler, North Carolina (AP)
- Ron Spruill, North Carolina (AP)

=== Centers ===
- Tony Berryhill, Clemson (AP)

=== Tight ends ===
- Ken Denfield, Wake Forest (AP)

=== Quarterbacks ===
- Homer Jordan, Clemson (AP)

=== Running backs ===
- Kelvin Bryant, North Carolina (AP)
- Joe McIntosh, NC State (AP)

== Defensive selections ==
=== Defensive linemen ===
- Jeff Bryant, Clemson (AP)
- Dan Benish, Clemson (AP)
- Steve Fuller, North Carolina (AP)
- Stuart Anderson, Virginia (AP)
- Charles Bowser, Duke (AP)

=== Linebackers ===
- Jeff Davis, Clemson (AP)
- Lee Shaffer, North Carolina (AP)

=== Defensive backs ===
- Terry Kinard, Clemson (AP)
- Greg Poole, North Carolina (AP)
- Dennis Tabron, Duke (AP)
- Donnie LeGrande, NC State (AP)

== Special teams ==
=== Placekickers ===
- Todd Auten, NC State (AP)

=== Punters ===
- Jeff Hayes, North Carolina (AP)

== Key ==
AP = Associated Press

== See also ==
1981 College Football All-America Team
