= 2012 Chick-fil-A Bowl =

- 45th Peach Bowl
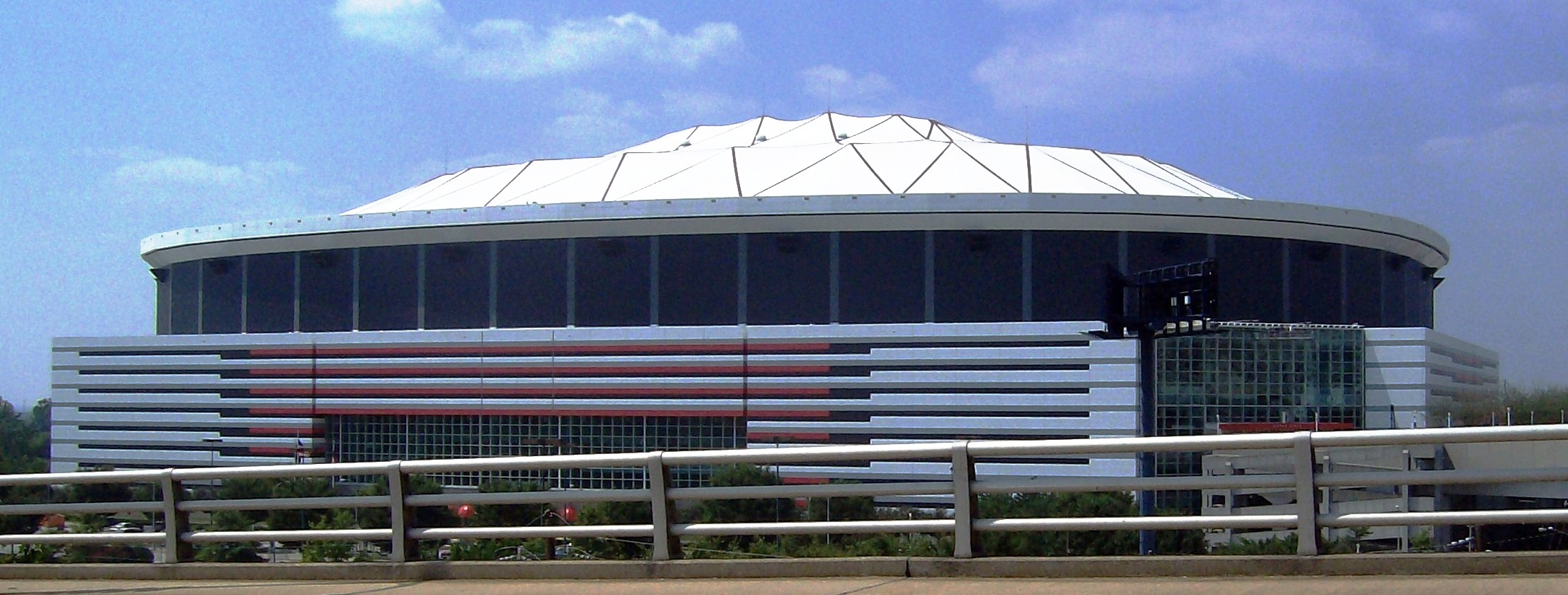
- The Georgia Dome in Atlanta, Georgia, hosted the Chick-fil-A Bowl.
LSU Tigers	Clemson Tigers
(10–2)	(10–2)
SEC	ACC
24	25
Head coach: Les Miles	Head coach: Dabo Swinney
AP / Coaches / BCS; 9 / 7 / 8	AP / Coaches / BCS; 14 / 13 / 14
	1	2	3	4	Total
LSU	7	7	10	0	24
Clemson	7	6	0	12	25
- Date: December 31, 2012
- Season: 2012
- Stadium: Georgia Dome
- Location: Atlanta
- MVP: Tajh Boyd
- Favorite: LSU by 4
- Referee: David Witvoet (Big Ten)
- Attendance: 68,027

United States TV coverage
- Network: ESPN
- Announcers: Mike Patrick, Ed Cunningham and Jeannine Edwards

The 2012 Chick-fil-A Bowl was a college football bowl game held on December 31, 2012, at the Georgia Dome in Atlanta, Georgia. With sponsorship from Chick-fil-A, it was the 45th edition of the game known throughout most of its history as the Peach Bowl. The game began at 7:30 p.m. EST and aired on ESPN. It featured the LSU Tigers from the Southeastern Conference (SEC) against the Clemson Tigers from the Atlantic Coast Conference (ACC) and was the final game of the 2012 NCAA Division I FBS football season for both teams. Both Tigers accepted an invitation to the game after achieving a 10–2 regular season record.

This was not the first time the two Tigers have met in the Chick-fil-A Bowl; the 1996 game also pitted them against each other, with LSU topping Clemson by a score of 10–7. Their first meeting was the 1959 Sugar Bowl, which LSU won in a 7–0 shutout after being named the 1958 national champion in the end-of-season AP Poll and Coaches Poll.

Clemson won the game in a 25–24 upset. Despite out-gaining LSU by 445–219 in total yards, Clemson trailed for much of the game. Clemson was able to win after placekicker Chandler Catanzaro made a 37-yard field goal as time expired. Clemson quarterback Tajh Boyd, who completed 36 of 50 passes for 346 yards, was named the game's most valuable player.

== Teams ==
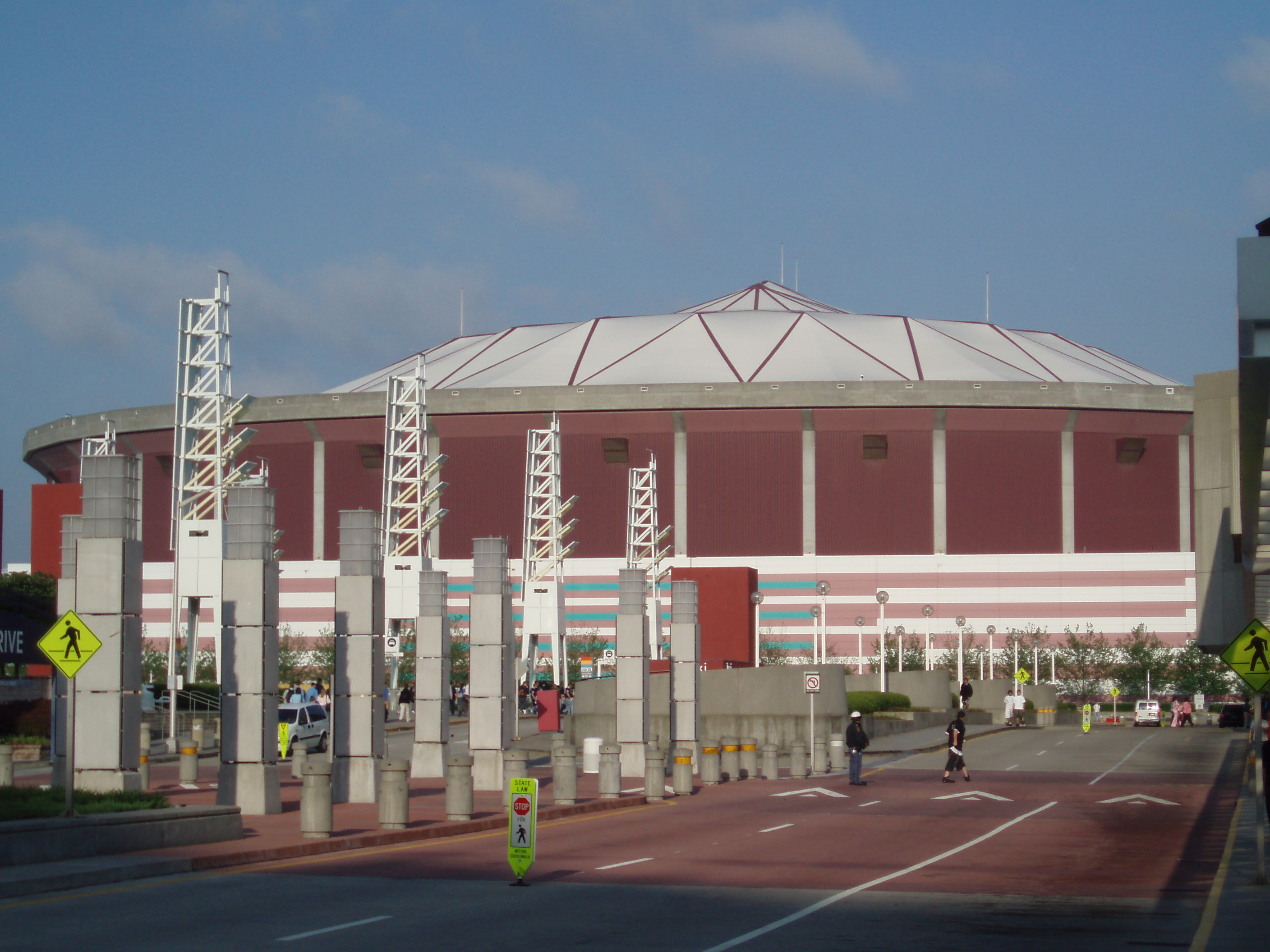
The 2012 Chick-fil-A Bowl was played at the Georgia Dome.

The 2012 Chick-fil-A Bowl marked the third meeting between Clemson and LSU, with LSU holding a 2–0 advantage coming into the game. The previous meeting was a 10–7 victory for LSU in the 1996 Chick-fil-A bowl.

=== LSU ===
Coming off an SEC Championship and a heartbreaking shutout loss in the 2012 BCS National Championship Game, the Tigers were early favorites to return to the national title game. However, despite a stellar 6–2 record in conference play, the Tigers finished one game behind the same Alabama Crimson Tide which had defeated them for the national title the previous January, being denied even a secondary BCS bowl game because of the two-team limit as well as the Florida Gators occupying that second spot.

LSU entered the game with a defense that allowed only 16.9 points per game and 297.8 total yards per game. Leading LSU's defense was led by linebacker Kevin Minter, who led LSU's defense with 111 tackles.

This was LSU's sixth Chick-fil-A Bowl; they had previously appeared in the 2008 game against Georgia Tech, where they won the game 38–3. LSU held a 5–0 record in the bowl game coming into the game.

=== Clemson ===
Coming off an ACC Championship, the Tigers kept their success going, actually finishing with a better record (both overall and in conference play) than their previous season, with their 7–1 conference record leading to an Atlantic Division Co-Championship. However, they would lose the tiebreaker to the other co-champion, the Florida State Seminoles, keeping the Tigers out of the 2012 ACC Championship Game.

Clemson entered the game averaging 42.3 points per game and 518.3 yards of total offense per game. Leading Clemson's offense was quarterback Tajh Boyd, who came into the game with 3,550 passing yards and 34 touchdown passes. The offense was also led by running back Andre Ellington and wide receiver DeAndre Hopkins. Clemson was less impressive on the defense, however, allowing more than 27 points in half of its games.

This was Clemson's eighth Chick-fil-A Bowl; they had previously appeared in the 2007 game against Auburn, where they lost the game, 20–23. Clemson held a 2–5 record in the bowl game coming into the game.

== Game summary ==
=== First quarter ===
Clemson fumbled on the second play of the game after LSU's Barkevious Mingo forced Clemson's Sammy Watkins to fumble. Watkins suffered a right ankle injury on the fumble and sat out the rest of the game. Taking advantage of the fumble, LSU jumped to a 7–0 lead on a 17-yard touchdown run from Jeremy Hill. Clemson was able to respond on its next drive, tying the game 7–7 on an 11-yard touchdown run from Tajh Boyd. The rest of the first quarter remained scoreless as the two teams exchanged punts.

=== Second quarter ===
LSU opened the second quarter with a 3-yard touchdown pass from quarterback Zach Mettenberger to Spencer Ware to go up 14–7. Clemson was able to respond with an 11-yard touchdown pass from quarterback Tajh Boyd to DeAndre Hopkins. The point after attempt was blocked, however, making the score 14–13. The score remained 14–13 in LSU's favor going into halftime.

=== Third quarter ===
Clemson was held scoreless in the third quarter as LSU was able to further extend their lead. LSU opened the third quarter with a 57-yard touchdown run from Jeremy Hill to make the score 21–13. After forcing Clemson's Andre Ellington to fumble, LSU was able to extend their lead 24–13 on a 20-yard field goal from Drew Alleman.

=== Fourth quarter ===
Clemson's defense dominated the fourth quarter, as Clemson held LSU to only 1 yard of offense. Clemson was able to cut into LSU's lead early in the fourth quarter on a 26-yard field goal from Chandler Catanzaro to make the score 24–16. After forcing LSU to punt, Clemson was able to once again cut into LSU's lead on a 12-yard touchdown pass from Tajh Boyd to DeAndre Hopkins. The subsequent two-point conversion was unsuccessful, however, making the score 24–22 with 2:47 left in regulation. On LSU's next possession, LSU was unable to run out the clock or force Clemson to use any timeouts, thanks to a couple of incomplete passes from Zach Mettenberger. LSU punted the ball away, giving Clemson the ball back with only 1:39 left in regulation at Clemson's own 20-yard line.

Clemson's drive started poorly, as Tajh Boyd failed to complete his first two passes of the drive. On the third play of the drive, Tajh Boyd was sacked by Sam Montgomery. Facing a 4th and 16 at their own 14-yard line, Clemson was able to keep the drive alive on a 26-yard pass from Boyd to DeAndre Hopkins. Tajh Boyd was then able to lead Clemson to LSU's 20-yard line to set up a 37-yard field goal attempt for Chandler Catanzaro. Catanzaro was able to kick the field goal as time expired, giving Clemson a 25–24 victory over LSU.

=== Game notes ===
With the victory, Clemson recorded its first 11 win season since its 1981 season. In addition, Clemson's DeAndre Hopkins set an ACC record for most consecutive game with a touchdown catch, at 10. The 2012 Chick-fil-A bowl also marked LSU's first loss to an ACC team since 1955. Hopkins also set Chick-Fil-A/Peach Bowl records for receptions and receiving yards (13 receptions, 191 yards). Clemson also set Bowl records for most total first downs by one team (32), offensive plays by one team (100), and held LSU to a Bowl record low for offensive plays by a team (48).

== Scoring summary ==
Scoring summary

Quarter	Time	Drive			Team	Scoring information	Score	
Quarter	Time	Plays	Yards	TOP	Team	Scoring information	LSU	Clemson
1	14:05	2	23	0:24	LSU	Jeremy Hill 17-yard touchdown run, Drew Alleman kick good	7	0
1	9:46	11	75	4:19	Clemson	Tajh Boyd 11-yard touchdown run, Chandler Catanzaro kick good	7	7
2	13:12	8	40	4:03	LSU	Jarvis Landry 6-yard touchdown reception from Zach Mettenberger, Drew Alleman kick good	14	7
2	5:43	8	70	3:12	Clemson	DeAndre Hopkins 11-yard touchdown reception from Tajh Boyd, Chandler Catanzaro kick blocked	14	13
3	14:43	1	57	0:17	LSU	Jeremy Hill 57-yard touchdown run, Drew Alleman kick good	21	13
3	2:45	6	26	2:45	LSU	20-yard field goal by Drew Alleman	24	13
4	9:26	13	63	5:26	Clemson	26-yard field goal by Chandler Catanzaro	24	16
4	2:47	11	77	4:20	Clemson	DeAndre Hopkins 12-yard touchdown reception from Tajh Boyd, 2-point pass failed	24	22
4	0:00	12	60	1:39	Clemson	37-yard field goal by Chandler Catanzaro	24	25
"TOP" = time of possession. For other American football terms, see Glossary of American football.							24	25

== Statistical summary ==
Statistics	LSU	Clemson
First downs	9	32
Total offense, plays-yards	48-219	100-445
Rushes-yards (net)	25-99	50-99
Turnovers	1	2
Passing yards (net)	120	346
Passes, Comp-Att-Int	14-23-1	36-50-0
Time of Possession	23:39	36:21
Penalties – yards	7-66	6-47
Punts – Average yards	9-44.6	6-43.3

For his game-winning performance, Clemson quarterback Tajh Boyd was named the game's Most Valuable Player. He completed 36 of his 50 passes for 346 yards and 2 touchdowns. Both of Boyd's touchdown passes went to DeAndre Hopkins, who had 191 receiving yards in the game. Boyd also led his team in rushing attempts at 29.

Clemson outgained LSU 445–219 in total yards and Clemson's defense was able to limit LSU to 9 first downs. LSU quarterback Zach Mettenberger was sacked 6 times and was held to only 120 passing yards.

LSU's leading rusher was Jeremy Hill, who rushed for 124 yards and 2 touchdowns on 12 carries. LSU's no. 2 rusher was Spencer Ware, who rushed for 9 yards on 3 carries. Clemson's leading rusher was Andre Ellington, who accumulated 50 yards on 11 carries. Clemson's no. 2 rusher was Roderick McDowell, who rushed for 26 yards on 7 carries.
