= 1981 Clemson Tigers football team =

American college football season

1981 Clemson Tigers football

Consensus national champion ACC champion Orange Bowl champion

Orange Bowl, W 22–15 vs. Nebraska
- Conference: Atlantic Coast Conference

Ranking
- Coaches: No. 1
- AP: No. 1
- Record: 12–0 (6–0 ACC)
- Head coach: Danny Ford (3rd full, 4th overall season)
- Offensive coordinator: Nelson Stokley (2nd season)
- Offensive scheme: Option
- Base defense: 5–2
- Captains: Jeff Davis; Lee Nanney; Perry Tuttle
- Home stadium: Memorial Stadium

1981 Atlantic Coast Conference football standings
	Conf.					Overall
Team	W		L		T	W		L		T
No. 1 Clemson $	6	–	0	–	0	12	–	0	–	0
No. 9 North Carolina	5	–	1	–	0	10	–	2	–	0
Maryland	4	–	2	–	0	4	–	6	–	1
Duke	3	–	3	–	0	6	–	5	–	0
NC State	2	–	4	–	0	4	–	7	–	0
Wake Forest	1	–	5	–	0	4	–	7	–	0
Virginia	0	–	6	–	0	1	–	10	–	0
$ – Conference champion; Rankings from AP Poll

The 1981 Clemson Tigers football team represented Clemson University in the Atlantic Coast Conference (ACC) during the 1981 NCAA Division I-A football season. The Tigers were led by head coach Danny Ford and played their home games in Memorial Stadium. Clemson finished their undefeated 1981 season with a 22–15 victory over the No. 4 Nebraska Cornhuskers in the 1982 Orange Bowl, and were voted No. 1 in the Associated Press (AP) and United Press International (UPI) polls.

This was Clemson’s last national championship until 2016.

== Achievements ==
The Clemson Tigers finished the 1981 season undefeated and untied (12–0) and were voted No. 1 in the Associated Press and UPI polls. Following the bowl win over Nebraska, a consensus national championship was secured via voting by AP, UPI, Football Writers Association of America (FWAA), and National Football Foundation (NFF). The Clemson Tigers of the 1980s were the fifth winningest Division I college football team of the decade, with a record of 86–25–4 (.765).

Clemson head coach Danny Ford was awarded the 1981 Coach of the Year Award by the AFCA and the FWAA. At the time, Coach Ford was the youngest ever to receive the award, and the youngest to have won a National Championship.

In the 1982 Orange Bowl, Clemson QB Homer Jordan received Offensive Most Valuable Player honors. He earned first-team All-ACC honors in 1981, his junior season, and finished first in the ACC in passing efficiency and 12th in the nation. Jordan was an honorable mention All-American selection in 1981. He was runner-up for ACC MVP behind teammate Jeff Davis, but the team voted him MVP in 1981. Even though Jordan was injured for much of his senior season, he helped lead the 1982 team to a 9-1-1 record and number-eight national ranking. He also earned honorable mention All-American honors as a senior. He ranked as Clemson's 18th greatest player of the century. Jordan was inducted into the Clemson Hall of Fame in 1993.

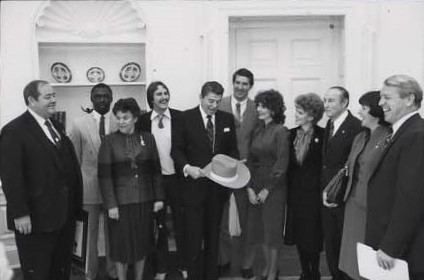
Tigers visit the Oval Office in January 1982 with President Ronald Reagan

Clemson LB Jeff Davis, captain of Clemson's 1981 team, was inducted into the Clemson Ring of Honor in 1995. Davis was a Consensus All-American in 1981 when he led the Tigers in tackles. Davis was also named MVP of the ACC and was the defensive MVP of the Orange Bowl victory over Nebraska. Davis has the third best mark in career tackles in Clemson history and has also caused the most fumbles and recovered the most fumbles in team history. He was a fifth-round draft pick of the Tampa Bay Buccaneers and played for them from 1982 to 1987. He led the Buccaneers in tackles and was the captain of the team for four seasons. Along with being in the Clemson Ring of Honor, Davis was inducted into the Clemson Hall of Fame in 1989 and the South Carolina Hall of Fame in 2001. He was named to Clemson's Centennial football team in 1996 and was inducted into the College Football Hall of Fame in December 2007.

Clemson DB Terry Kinard is the only Clemson player to be a unanimous All-America pick. He was the first two-time Clemson All-American defensive back and a first-team AP All-American two years in a row, the only Clemson player to accomplish that. Kinard was named the CBS National Defensive Player-of-the-Year for the 1982 season and was chosen to the USA Today All-College Football Team in the 1980s. Kinard was a two-year member of the All-ACC team. He is the all-time Clemson leader in interceptions with 17, a mark that tied the 20-year-old ACC record. He also holds the Clemson record for tackles by a defensive back with 294 in his career. After leaving Clemson Kinard was a first-round pick of the New York Giants in 1983, and was the 10th pick overall in the draft. Sports Illustrated named him to College Football's Centennial Team in 1999. He played with Super Bowl Champion New York Giants in 1986 and was with the club from 1983 until 1989. Kinard played in the 1988 Pro Bowl Game. Kinard played with Houston Oilers in 1990. He was named to Clemson's Centennial team in April 1996. He ranks as Clemson's #3 football player of all-time was inducted into the College Football Hall of Fame in December 2001. He was inducted into Clemson Hall of Fame in 1992 and the Ring of Honor in 2001. He was also inducted into the state of South Carolina Hall of Fame in 2002.

Clemson WR Perry Tuttle was voted a first-team All-American in 1981, and set then-Clemson records for receptions and yards. Tuttle also had at least one reception during the last 32 games of his Tiger career. He still ranks fourth all-time in receptions (150), second all-time in receiving yards (2,534), second in touchdown receptions (17), and ninth in yards per reception (16.89). In the 1982 Orange Bowl, he had five receptions for 56 yards, including a 13-yard touchdown pass. That touchdown catch was the final reception of his Clemson career and earned him a place on the cover of Sports Illustrated. Following his Clemson career, Tuttle was chosen with the 19th overall pick of the 1982 NFL Draft by the Buffalo Bills. After a three-year NFL career, Tuttle went on to the Canadian Football League where he had a six-year career with the Winnipeg Blue Bombers. He helped lead the team to a Grey Cup Championship in 1990 and was inducted into the Winnipeg Hall of Fame in 1997. Tuttle was inducted into the Clemson Hall of Fame in 1991 and named to Clemson's Centennial team in 1996.

== Schedule ==
Clemson hosted Wofford on Saturday, September 5, in the season opener for both teams. Wofford was one of the three teams Clemson played in its first year of football competition in 1896, but had not played the Terriers since 1940. Clemson was originally scheduled to play the Villanova Wildcats for the third game of the 1981 season, on Saturday, September 26, but the Wildcats had canceled their football program in the spring of that year. Wofford had an open spot in their schedule and agreed to play Clemson.

Date	Time	Opponent	Rank	Site	TV	Result	Attendance	Source
September 5	1:00 p.m.	Wofford*		Memorial Stadium; Clemson, SC		W 45–10	59,313	
September 12	8:30 p.m.	at Tulane*		Louisiana Superdome; New Orleans, LA		W 13–5	45,736	
September 19	1:00 p.m.	No. 4 Georgia*		Memorial Stadium; Clemson, SC (rivalry)	ESPN	W 13–3	62,466	
October 3	1:30 p.m.	at Kentucky*	No. 14	Commonwealth Stadium; Lexington, KY	ABC	W 21–3	57,453	
October 10	1:00 p.m.	Virginia^{†}	No. 9	Memorial Stadium; Clemson, SC		W 27–0	63,064	
October 17	1:30 p.m.	at Duke	No. 6	Wallace Wade Stadium; Durham, NC		W 38–10	26,000	
October 24	1:00 p.m.	NC State	No. 4	Memorial Stadium; Clemson, SC (rivalry)		W 17–7	62,727	
October 31	1:00 p.m.	Wake Forest	No. 3	Memorial Stadium; Clemson, SC	USA	W 82–24	60,383	
November 7	1:00 p.m.	at No. 8 North Carolina	No. 2	Kenan Stadium; Chapel Hill, NC	ABC	W 10–8	53,611	
November 14	1:00 p.m.	Maryland	No. 2	Memorial Stadium; Clemson, SC	USA	W 21–7	63,199	
November 21	1:30 p.m.	at South Carolina*	No. 2	Williams–Brice Stadium; Columbia, SC (rivalry)	ESPN	W 29–13	56,971	
January 1, 1982	8:00 p.m.	vs. No. 4 Nebraska*	No. 1	Miami Orange Bowl; Miami, FL (Orange Bowl)	NBC	W 22–15	72,748	
*Non-conference game; ^{†}Homecoming; Rankings from AP Poll released prior to the game; All times are in Eastern time

== Game summaries ==
=== Wofford ===
SCORING SUMMARY
	1	2	3	4	T
Clemson	3	14	14	14	45
Wofford	3	0	0	7	10
WOF - Hairston 24 FG; CLE - Igwebuike 52 FG; CLE - Tuttle 80 pass from Jordan (Paulling kick); CLE - Jordan 14 run (Paulling kick); CLE - Magwood 11 pass from Jordan (Paulling kick); CLE - Jordan 3 run (Paulling kick); CLE - C. McSwain 5 run (Igwebuike kick); WOF - Derrick 15 pass from Thompson (Hairston kick); CLE - McCall 10 run (Paulling run)

=== at Tulane ===
SCORING SUMMARY
	1	2	3	4	T
Clemson	0	7	0	6	13
Tulane	5	0	0	0	5
TU - Manalla 46 FG; TU - Safety, Hatcher falls on bad snap in end zone CLE - Austin 4 run (Paulling kick); CLE - Paulling 31 FG; CLE - Paulling 37 FG

=== Georgia ===
SCORING SUMMARY
	1	2	3	4	T
Clemson	0	10	0	3	13
#4 Georgia	0	0	3	0	3
CLE - Tuttle 8 pass from Jordan (Paulling kick); CLE - Igwebuike 38 FG; UGA - Butler 40 FG; CLE - Igwebuike 29 FG

=== at Kentucky ===
SCORING SUMMARY
	1	2	3	4	T
#14 Clemson	0	0	14	7	21
Kentucky	3	0	0	0	3
UK - Griggs 40 FG; CLE - Mack 11 run (Paulling kick); CLE - Jordan 3 run (Paulling kick); CLE - McSwain 3 run (Paulling kick)

=== Virginia ===
SCORING SUMMARY
	1	2	3	4	T
#9 Clemson	3	7	14	3	27
Virginia	0	0	0	0	0
CLE - Igwebuike 22 FG; CLE - Austin 42 run (Paulling kick); CLE - McCall 5 run (Paulling kick); CLE - Austin 1 run (Paulling kick); CLE - Igwebuike 32 FG

=== at Duke ===
SCORING SUMMARY
	1	2	3	4	T
#6 Clemson	7	17	14	0	38
Duke	0	3	7	0	10
CLE - Crite 4 run (Paulling kick); CLE - Paulling 20 FG; CLE - Austin 15 run (Paulling kick); CLE - Jordan 1 run (Paulling kick); DUK - McKinney 29 FG; CLE - Austin 2 run (Paulling kick); DUK - Jones 21 pass from Bennett (McKinney kick); CLE - Tuttle 29 pass from Jordan (Paulling kick)

=== NC State ===
SCORING SUMMARY
	1	2	3	4	T
#4 Clemson	3	7	0	7	17
N.C. State	7	0	0	0	7
NCS - Lawson 13 run (? kick); CLE - Igwebuike 39 FG; CLE - Austin 1 run (Paulling kick); CLE - McCall 15 run (Paulling kick)

=== Wake Forest ===
SCORING SUMMARY
	1	2	3	4	T
#3 Clemson	14	35	20	13	82
Wake Forest	7	7	3	7	24
CLE - Austin 4 run (Paulling kick); CLE - Austin 3 run (Paulling kick); WF - Duckett 17 pass from Schofield (Denfield kick); CLE - C. McSwain 1 run (Paulling kick); CLE - Mack 10 run (Paulling kick); CLE - Jordan 7 run (Paulling kick); CLE - McCall 24 run (Paulling kick); CLE - C. McSwain 16 run (Paulling kick); WF - Cunningham 1 run (Denfield kick); CLE - Tuttle 75 pass from Jordan (L. Brown kick failed); WF - Denfield 22 FG; CLE - Tuttle 25 pass from Gasque (L. Brown kick); CLE - C. McSwain 12 run (L. Brown kick); CLE - Holloman 3 run (L. Brown kick); CLE - Crawford 72 run (L. Brown kick failed); WF - Duckett 5 pass from Schofield (Denfield)

=== at North Carolina ===
SCORING SUMMARY
	1	2	3	4	T
#2 Clemson	0	7	3	0	10
#8 North Carolina	0	5	3	0	8
UNC - Barwick 22 FG; CLE - McCall 7 run (Paulling kick); UNC - Safety, Barlow blocks punt out of end zone CLE - Igwebuike 39 FG; UNC - Barwick 26 FG

=== Maryland ===
SCORING SUMMARY
	1	2	3	4	T
#2 Clemson	7	14	0	0	21
Maryland	0	0	0	7	7
CLE - Tuttle 14 pass from Jordan (Paulling kick); CLE - Tuttle 5 pass from Jordan (Paulling kick); CLE - Gaillard 12 pass from Jordan (Paulling kick); MD - Wysocki 7 run (Atkinson kick)

=== at South Carolina ===
SCORING SUMMARY
	1	2	3	4	T
#2 Clemson	6	9	7	7	29
South Carolina	7	0	6	0	13
USC - Wright 1 run (Fleetwood kick); CLE - Rembert recovered blocked punt (Paulling kick failed); CLE - Paulling 24 FG; CLE - Jordan 11 run (pass failed); USC - Smith 10 pass from Beckham (run failed); CLE - C. McSwain 1 run (Paulling kick); CLE - C. McSwain 23 run (Paulling kick)

=== vs. Nebraska (Orange Bowl) ===
SCORING SUMMARY
	1	2	3	4	T
#1 Clemson	6	6	10	0	22
#4 Nebraska	7	0	0	8	15
CLE - Igwebuike 41 FG; NEB - Steels 25 pass from Rozier (Seibel kick); CLE - Igwebuike 41 FG; CLE - Austin 2 run (pass failed); CLE - Tuttle 13 pass from Jordan (Paulling kick); CLE - Igwebuike 36 FG; NEB - Craig 26 run (Craig run)

== Personnel ==
=== Coaching staff ===
- Danny Ford - Head Coach
- Tom Harper - Assistant Head Coach/Defensive Coordinator/Defensive Line
- Nelson Stokley - Offensive Coordinator/Quarterbacks
- Willie Anderson - Defensive Line
- Steve Hale - Defensive Ends
- Les Herrin - Linebackers
- Curley Hallman/Rick Whitt - Defensive Backs
- Larry Van Der Heyden/Buddy King - Offensive Line
- Rex Kipps - Tight Ends
- Chuck Reedy - Running Backs
- Lawson Holland - Wide Receivers
- George Dostal-Strength and Conditioning
- Fred Hoover - Head Athletic Trainer
- Bert Henderson - Assistant Trainer
- Bob Easley - Student Trainer
- Joe Franks - Student Trainer
- Greg Craig - Student Trainer
- Vann Yates - Student Trainer
- Jay Bennett - Student Trainer
- Chip Winchester - Student Trainer
- Len Gough - Equipment Manager
- George Caine - Graduate Assistant
- Mark Garrison - Student Manager

=== Roster ===
1981 Clemson Tigers football team roster
Players
Coaches
Offense

Pos.	#	Name	Class
RB	7	Cliff Austin	Jr
C	63	Tony Berryhill	Sr
G	70	Brian Clark	Sr
RB	48	Craig Crawford	Fr
TE	85	Bubba Diggs	Jr
TE	81	K. D. Dunn	Fr
G	60	James Farr	So
OT	61	Brad Fisher	Sr
WR	41	Jerry Gaillard	Sr
QB	11	Mike Gasque	Sr
QB	3	Homer Jordan	Jr
RB	27	Kevin Mack	So
C	52	Cary Massaro	So
RB	35	Chuck McSwain	Jr
OT	77	Lee Nanney	Sr
WR	15	Jeff Stockstill	Jr
WR	22	Perry Tuttle	Sr

Defense

Pos.	#	Name	Class
DT	69	Vernie Anthony	Jr
CB	1	Vandaell Arrington	So
DT	71	Dan Benish	Jr
DE	57	Nick Bowman	Sr
DB	9	Ken Brown	So
DT	99	Jeff Bryant	Sr
SS	26	Tim Childers	So
LB	24	Billy Davis	So
LB	45	Jeff Davis	Jr
LB	36	Dean Day	Jr
DT	94	William Devane	So
CB	29	Hollis Hall	Sr
DE	12	Andy Headen	Jr
FS	43	Terry Kinard	Jr
CB	28	Rod McSwain	So
DT	66	William Perry	Fr
LB	90	Johnny Rembert	Jr
CB	21	Anthony Rose	Sr
DE	84	Bill Smith	Sr
LB	82	Danny Triplett	Jr

Special teams

Pos.	#	Name	Class
P	5	Dale Hatcher	Fr
K	18	Donald Igwebuike	Fr

Head coach

- Danny Ford

Coordinators/assistant coaches

- Curley Hallman (DB)

Legend

- (C) Team captain
- (S) Suspended
- (I) Ineligible
- Injured
- Redshirt

Roster

=== Depth chart ===
Defense

FS
Terry Kinard
Billy Davis

WLB	SLB
Jeff Davis	Danny Triplett
Randy Cheek	Johnny Rembert

Cat
Tim Childers
Jeff Suttle

CB
Anthony Rose
Randy Learn

Bandit	DT	NT	DT	DE
Andy Headen	Jeff Bryant	William Perry	Dan Benish	Bill Smith
Mark Richardson	Jim Scott	William Devane	Ray Brown	Joe Glenn

CB
Hollis Hall
Rod McSwain

Offense

WR
Perry Tuttle
Jeff Stockstill

LT	LG	C	RG	RT
Brad Fisher	James Farr	Tony Berryhill	Brian Clark	Lee Nanney
Alex Hudson	Brian Butcher	Cary Massaro	Bob Mayberry	Gary Brown

TE
Bubba Diggs
Jim Wurst

WR
Jerry Gaillard
Frank Magwood

QB
Homer Jordan
Mike Gasque

Key reserves
RB Brendon Crite
QB Anthony Parete
WR
RB Duke Holloman
FB Craig Crawford

RB
Cliff Austin
Chuck McSwain

FB
Jeff McCall
Kevin Mack

Special teams
PK Donald Igwebuike
PK Bob Paulling
P Dale Hatcher
P Richard Hendley
KR Perry Tuttle
PR Billy Davis
LS Scott Williams
H Anthony Parete
