= Danny Ford =

American football player and coach (born 1948)

- Ford in 2026

Biographical details
- Born: April 2, 1948 (age 78); Gadsden, Alabama, U.S.

Playing career
- 1967–1969: Alabama
- Position: Offensive tackle

Coaching career (HC unless noted)
- 1973: Alabama (OL)
- 1974–1976: Virginia Tech (OL)
- 1977–1978: Clemson (OL)
- 1978–1989: Clemson
- 1993–1997: Arkansas

Head coaching record
- Overall: 122–59–5
- Bowls: 6–3

Accomplishments and honors

Championships
- 1 national (1981); 5 ACC (1981–1982, 1986–1988); 1 SEC Western Division (1995)

Awards
- AFCA Coach of the Year (1981); Eddie Robinson Coach of the Year (1981); ACC Coach of the Year (1981); First-team All-SEC (1969)
- College Football Hall of Fame; Inducted in 2017 (profile)

Danny Lee Ford (born April 2, 1948) is an American former college football player and coach. He played college football at the University of Alabama from 1967 to 1969. He then served as the head football coach at Clemson University from 1978 to 1989 and at the University of Arkansas from 1993 to 1997, compiling a career record of 122–59–5. During his 12 seasons as head coach of the Clemson Tigers, he captured five ACC titles and won six bowl games. Ford's 1981 Clemson team completed a 12–0 season with a win in the Orange Bowl and was named the consensus national champion.

== Early career ==
After graduating from Gadsden High School in Gadsden, Alabama in 1966, Ford was an All-SEC selection under Paul "Bear" Bryant at the University of Alabama, where he played in three bowl games. He received a bachelor's degree in industrial arts in 1970 and a master's degree in special education in 1971 from Alabama. Ford coached as an assistant at Alabama and Virginia Tech before joining Charley Pell's staff at Clemson.

== Clemson ==
Pell left for the University of Florida after the end of the 1978 season, and Ford was named his successor. He led the Tigers in the 1978 Gator Bowl, defeating Ohio State, 17–15. That game is more remembered, however, for an incident in which Buckeye coach Woody Hayes punched Clemson nose guard Charlie Bauman. Hayes was fired the next day.

In 1981, Ford led Clemson to a 12–0 record and the national championship—the first national title in the school's 98-year history. They won the title by defeating Nebraska in the 1982 Orange Bowl. Nebraska was the third top-10 team upended by the Tigers that year, the others being defending national champion Georgia and North Carolina. (All three of these teams remained ranked in the top 10 at the end of the season in the final poll.) As of the 2023 season, Ford is still the youngest coach to win a national championship, doing so at age 33. Just days after the 1982 season ended, however, the Tigers were found guilty of recruiting violations. While most of them occurred under Pell, the NCAA found they had continued under Ford. The Tigers were barred from bowl games in 1982 and 1983, and kicked off live television in 1983 and 1984.

Ford didn't take long to recover from the probation, and won three straight ACC titles from 1986 and 1988. In 1989, Clemson registered a 10–2 season and top-12 national ranking for the fourth straight season. Ford closed his career with a 27–7 win over West Virginia (and their All-America quarterback Major Harris) in the Gator Bowl. In the decade of the 1980s, Clemson had the nation's fifth-highest winning percentage.

While at Clemson, Ford defeated a number of coaches later inducted into the College Football Hall of Fame, including Dan Devine, Joe Paterno, Tom Osborne, Barry Switzer, Bobby Bowden, Vince Dooley, Don Nehlen, and Woody Hayes.

Ford resigned on January 18, 1990, after a falling out with Clemson administration. He was subsequently cleared in an NCAA investigation that also was announced around that time.

Ford compiled a 96–29–4 (.760) record at Clemson, including a 6–2 bowl record. At the time of his resignation, he was the second-winningest coach in school history, behind only Frank Howard–a distinction he would maintain until 2017, when he was passed by current coach Dabo Swinney. He was the third winningest coach in the country on a percentage basis after the 1989 season. Ford also coached 21 All-Americans and 41 players who went on to play in the NFL, during his 11 seasons at Clemson.

== Arkansas ==
Joe Kines brought Ford to the University of Arkansas in 1992 to help with the clean-up following Frank Broyles' firing of Jack Crowe (Ford's former offensive coordinator at Clemson) after a loss to The Citadel. This immediately led to speculation that Ford would be named head coach on a permanent basis. The speculation bore fruit after the season, when Ford was named head coach. He led Arkansas to an SEC West championship in 1995 on the legs of Madre Hill and the defensive genius of Joe Lee Dunn, after emerging from two years under Crowe. However, this was one of only two winning seasons the Razorbacks notched in Ford's tenure. Broyles fired Ford following back-to-back 4–7 campaigns. Ford finished 26–30–1 in five seasons with the Razorbacks.

It was ironic that Ford ended up at Arkansas, since his replacement at Clemson was former Razorback head coach Ken Hatfield, who had had his own falling out with Arkansas athletic director Frank Broyles. Hatfield took the Clemson job in January 1990, less than a week after Ford resigned, without even visiting the campus.

Ford proved to be a solid recruiter, as his replacement at Arkansas, Houston Nutt, went on to win 17 games in the 1998 (9–3) and 1999 (8–4) seasons combined, to include a 1998 SEC West co-championship and a Cotton Bowl championship on January 1, 2000, with a victory over Texas. Both of those squads included players Ford had recruited to Arkansas.

== Family ==
Ford and his wife, Deborah, have four children, Jennifer, Ashleigh, Elizabeth, and Danny "Lee" Ford II. They currently reside in Central, South Carolina.

His son, Danny Lee Ford II, is running for South Carolina Commissioner of Agriculture in 2026 - he advanced to the runoff on June 23, 2026 against Cody Simpson.

== Head coaching record ==
Year	Team	Overall	Conference	Standing	Bowl/playoffs	Coaches^{#}	AP^{°}
Clemson Tigers (Atlantic Coast Conference) (1978–1989)
1978	Clemson	1–0 (Note: Charley Pell coached the first 11 games of the season.)			W Gator	7	6
1979	Clemson	8–4	4–2	T–2nd	L Peach		
1980	Clemson	6–5	2–4	T–4th			
1981	Clemson	12–0	6–0	1st	W Orange	1	1
1982	Clemson	9–1–1	6–0	1st			8
1983	Clemson	9–1–1	7–0	1st			11
1984	Clemson	7–4	5–2	2nd			
1985	Clemson	6–6	4–3	4th	L Independence		
1986	Clemson	8–2–2	5–1–1	1st	W Gator	19	17
1987	Clemson	10–2	6–1	1st	W Florida Citrus	10	12
1988	Clemson	10–2	6–1	1st	W Florida Citrus	8	9
1989	Clemson	10–2	5–2	3rd	W Gator	11	12
Clemson:		96–29–4	56–16–1				
Arkansas Razorbacks (Southeastern Conference) (1993–1997)
1993	Arkansas	6–4–1	4–3–1	3rd (Western)			
1994	Arkansas	4–7	2–6	T–4th (Western)			
1995	Arkansas	8–5	6–3	1st (Western)	L Carquest		
1996	Arkansas	4–7	2–6	T–5th (Western)			
1997	Arkansas	4–7	2–6	T–5th (Western)			
Arkansas:		26–30–1	16–24–1				
Total:		122–59–5					
National championship Conference title Conference division title or championship game berth
^{#}Rankings from final Coaches Poll.; ^{°}Rankings from final AP Poll.
