= 1982 Orange Bowl =

- 48th Orange Bowl
- The Miami Orange Bowl in Miami, Florida, hosted the Orange Bowl.
Clemson Tigers	Nebraska Cornhuskers
(11–0)	(9–2)
ACC	Big Eight
22	15
Head coach: Danny Ford	Head coach: Tom Osborne
AP / Coaches; 1 / 1	AP / Coaches; 4 / 4
	1	2	3	4	Total
Clemson	6	6	10	0	22
Nebraska	7	0	0	8	15
- Date: January 1, 1982
- Season: 1981
- Stadium: Orange Bowl
- Location: Miami, Florida
- MVP: Homer Jordan (Clemson QB); Jeff Davis (Clemson LB)
- Favorite: Nebraska by 3½-4½ points
- Referee: Robert Aillet (SEC)
- Attendance: 72,748

United States TV coverage
- Network: NBC
- Announcers: Don Criqui and John Brodie
- Nielsen ratings: 18.0

The 1982 Orange Bowl was the 48th edition of the college football bowl game, played at the Orange Bowl in Miami, Florida, on Friday, January 1. Part of the 1981–82 bowl game season, it matched the top-ranked and undefeated Clemson Tigers of the Atlantic Coast Conference (ACC) and the #4 Nebraska Cornhuskers of the Big Eight Conference. Underdog Clemson won, 22–15, and gained their first national championship.

== Teams ==
=== Clemson ===
Led by head coach Danny Ford, the Tigers began the season unranked, won all eleven games in the regular season, and moved up to first in the rankings in late November. Their notable wins were over Georgia and North Carolina. Clemson was attempting to win its first national championship. The Tigers were making their third appearance in the Orange Bowl, but the first in a quarter century.

=== Nebraska ===
The Huskers had two early losses, at Iowa and to Penn State, then won eight consecutive games to improve to fourth in the polls. Nebraska was making its eighth appearance in the Orange Bowl, the first in three years.

== Game summary ==
Earlier in the day, third-ranked Alabama lost the Cotton Bowl to #6 Texas. In the Sugar Bowl, now played at the same time as the Orange, second-ranked Georgia was defeated by #8 Pittsburgh, which opened the door for the Orange Bowl victor to claim the national title; Nebraska was favored by 3½ to 4½ points.

Clemson scored first on a 41-yard field goal by Donald Igwebuike to take a 3–0 lead. Nebraska then succeeded with a trick play, as running back Mike Rozier threw a 25-yard halfback pass to Anthony Steels for a touchdown and a 7–3 lead. Igwebuike kicked a 37-yard field goal to pull Clemson to 7–6. Following a Nebraska fumble, Cliff Austin scored on a two-yard touchdown run and Clemson led 12–7 at halftime.

In the third quarter, Clemson quarterback Homer Jordan threw a 13-yard touchdown pass to Perry Tuttle and Igwebuike added another field goal, this time a 36-yarder, and the Tigers extended their lead to fifteen points at 22–7.

In the fourth quarter, halfback Roger Craig scored for the Huskers on a 26-yard run. Following a Nebraska penalty on the first two-point conversion attempt, Craig then ran it in from the eight, which closed the margin to 22–15 with over nine minutes remaining. The Huskers got the ball back, but penalties ultimately killed the drive and forced them to punt the ball back to Clemson; the Tigers maintained possession for the bulk of the last six minutes and secured their first national championship in college football.

=== Scoring ===
First quarter

- Clemson – Donald Igwebuike 41-yard field goal, 11:39
- Nebraska – Anthony Steels 25-yard pass from Mike Rozier (Kevin Seibel kick), 6:43
- Clemson – Igwebuike 37-yard field goal, 1:03

Second quarter

- Clemson – Cliff Austin 2-yard run (pass failed), 3:56

Third quarter

- Clemson – Perry Tuttle 13-yard pass from Homer Jordan (Bob Paulling kick), 6:12
- Clemson – Igwebuike 36-yard field goal, 2:36

Fourth quarter

- Nebraska – Roger Craig 26-yard run (Craig run), 9:15

== Statistics ==
Statistics	Clemson	Nebraska
First downs	17	13
Rushes–yards	52–155	40–193
Passing yards	134	63
Passes (C–A–I)	11–22–1	6–17–0
Total offense	74–289	57–256
Punts–average	4–46	6–43
Fumbles–lost	3–0	3–2
Turnovers	1	2
Penalties–yards	7–57	8–64
Time of possession	32:22	27:38

== Aftermath ==
Clemson remained atop both final polls, while Nebraska dropped to eleventh (AP) and ninth (UPI). This would be the only time the Tigers won the national championship until 2016.

Nebraska played in the Orange Bowl in the next two seasons; Clemson returned thirty years later.
