= Clemson Tigers football =

American football team

2026 Clemson Tigers football team
- First season: 1896; 130 years ago
- Athletic director: Graham Neff
- General manager: Jordan Sorrells
- Head coach: Dabo Swinney; 19th season, 194–57 (.773)
- Location: Clemson, South Carolina
- Stadium: Memorial Stadium (capacity: 82,000)
- Field: Frank Howard Field
- NCAA division: Division I FBS
- Conference: ACC
- Colors: Orange and regalia
- All-time record: 812–478–44 (.625)
- CFP record: 6–5 (.545)
- Bowl record: 27–24 (.529)

National championships
- Claimed: 1981, 2016, 2018

National finalist
- CFP: 2015, 2016, 2018, 2019

College Football Playoff appearances
- 2015, 2016, 2017, 2018, 2019, 2020, 2024

Conference championships
- SIAA: 1900, 1902, 1903, 1906 SoCon: 1940, 1948 ACC: 1956, 1958, 1959, 1965, 1966, 1967, 1978, 1981, 1982, 1986, 1987, 1988, 1991, 2011, 2015, 2016, 2017, 2018, 2019, 2020, 2022, 2024

Division championships
- ACC Atlantic: 2009, 2011, 2015, 2016, 2017, 2018, 2019, 2020, 2022
- Consensus All-Americans: 31
- Rivalries: Alabama (rivalry); Auburn (rivalry); Boston College (rivalry); Florida State (rivalry); Georgia (rivalry); Georgia Tech (rivalry); NC State (rivalry); South Carolina (rivalry)

Uniforms
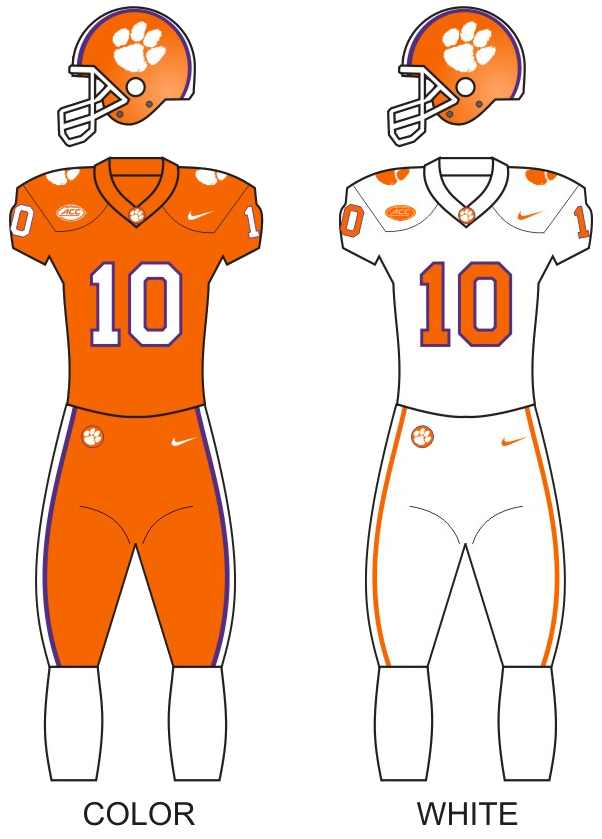
- Fight song: Tiger Rag
- Mascot: The Tiger
- Marching band: Clemson University Tiger Band
- Outfitter: Nike
- Website: clemsontigers.com

The Clemson Tigers football program are the American football team at Clemson University. The Tigers compete in the NCAA Division I Football Bowl Subdivision (FBS) of the National Collegiate Athletic Association (NCAA) of the Atlantic Coast Conference (ACC).

Formed in 1896, the program has an all-time record of 823-486-45, with a bowl record of 27–23. Clemson was a College Football Playoff finalist in 2015, 2016, 2018, and 2019, defeating Alabama in both 2016 and 2018 to secure the national title. Clemson has had six undefeated seasons (including the first-ever 15–0 team), boasted six consecutive playoff appearances from 2015 to 2021, and retains 27 conference championships, including 8 since 2011. Its alumni include over 100 All-Americans, 17 Academic All-Americans and over 250 players in the National Football League. Clemson has had eight members inducted into the College Football Hall of Fame: players Banks McFadden, Terry Kinard, Jeff Davis, and C. J. Spiller along with coaches John Heisman, Jess Neely, Frank Howard, and Danny Ford.

Clemson is one of the founding members of the ACC and holds 22 ACC titles, the most of any member. Its 28 total conference titles, including six consecutive ACC titles from 2015 to 2020, are the most of any ACC school. Clemson's most recent ACC title came in 2024, against SMU. Clemson's streak of eleven consecutive 10-win seasons from 2011-2022 ranked second in active streaks behind the Alabama Crimson Tide, coming to an end after Clemson's 2023 season where they finished with a 9–4 record. Among its eight undefeated regular seasons, Clemson has been crowned national champion 3 times. Clemson was named poll-era national champion and finished with its third perfect season with a win over Nebraska in the 1982 Orange Bowl. Clemson was the National Championship Finalist Runner-up with a 14–1 record in 2015 before winning the National Title over No. 1 Alabama in college football's first National Championship rematch in 2016, and again in 2018. However, Clemson then lost the next year to the undefeated LSU Tigers in the 2020 College Football Playoff National Championship 25-42. The Tigers have 46 bowl appearances, 20 of which are among the New Year's Six Bowls, including nine during the "Big Four" era. Clemson has 34 finishes in the final top 25 in the modern era and it finished in either the Associated Press final poll or the coaches' final poll a combined 59 times since 1939.

The Tigers play their home games in Memorial Stadium on the university's Clemson, South Carolina campus. The stadium's nickname, "Death Valley" was coined in 1948 by Presbyterian College head coach Lonnie McMillan after his teams were routinely defeated there. Memorial Stadium is among the largest stadiums in college football.

== History ==
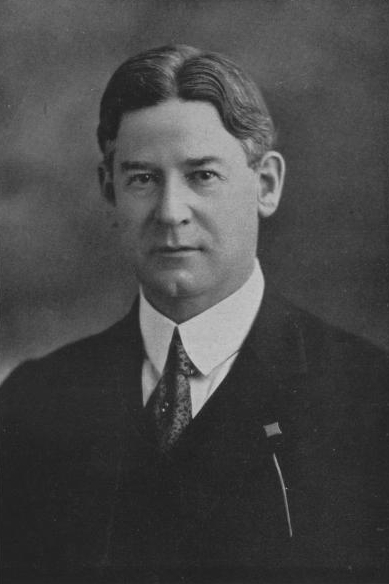
Walter Riggs, the "father of Clemson football"

Walter Riggs, often regarded as the "father of Clemson football," brought the sport to Clemson from the Agricultural and Mechanical College of Alabama (now Auburn University). The team's first game, played on Halloween 1896, resulted in a 2–1 record for the inaugural season. Riggs influenced the choice of the team mascot and colors. The Tigers’ early success included their first undefeated season in 1900 under coach John W. Heisman, who led the team to a 19–3–2 record. Heisman’s coaching set a precedent for excellence and innovation.

During the mid-20th century, the program experienced substantial growth under Frank Howard, who coached from 1940 to 1969. Howard's tenure saw Clemson win two Southern Conference championships and six ACC championships. Known for his colorful personality and imaginative storytelling, Howard integrated various offensive formations. His legacy includes the tradition of rubbing "Howard's Rock" before home games and the naming of the playing field at Memorial Stadium as "Frank Howard Field" in 1974.

The late 20th century and early 21st century saw the football program navigate through challenges and successes under multiple head coaches. Danny Ford led the Tigers to their first national championship in 1981, achieving an undefeated season. Ford's era was marked by NCAA sanctions due to recruiting violations, which impacted the program's reputation and success. Ken Hatfield, Ford’s successor, focused on cleaning up the program's image but faced criticism from fans, leading to his resignation. Subsequent coaches, including Tommy West, struggled to achieve consistent success until the hiring of Tommy Bowden in 1999, who maintained bowl eligibility every season, but failed to secure an ACC championship.

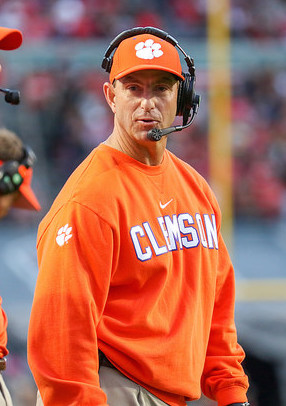
Coach Dabo Swinney

The modern era is defined by the leadership of Dabo Swinney, who became head coach in 2008. Swinney revitalized the program, leading the Tigers to multiple ACC championships and two national titles in 2016 and 2018. His tenure has been characterized by significant achievements, including the establishment of Clemson as a perennial contender in the College Football Playoff. Swinney’s ability to recruit and develop talent, combined with strategic hires like offensive coordinator Chad Morris and defensive coordinator Brent Venables, has sustained Clemson’s success. Notably, under Swinney, Clemson became the first team since 1897 to finish a season 15–0. In 2022, Clemson defeated Syracuse 27–21, extending the Tigers' home winning streak to 38, a new ACC record.

== Conference affiliations ==
- Southern Intercollegiate Athletic Association (1896–1921)
- Southern Conference (1922–1952)
- Atlantic Coast Conference (1953–present)

== Championships ==
=== National championships ===
Clemson claims three national championships. In 1981 they finished as the only undefeated team with a 22–15 victory over the No. 4 Nebraska Cornhuskers in the 1982 Orange Bowl, and were named the national champions by all major four consensus selectors (AP, Coaches, FWAA, and NFF). In 2016 and 2018 they won the College Football Playoff, defeating Alabama in the CFP National Championship Game both times.

Year	Coach	Selector	Record	Bowl	Final AP	Final Coaches
1981	Danny Ford	AP, Coaches, FWAA, NFF^{†}	12–0	Won Orange Bowl	No. 1	No. 1
2016	Dabo Swinney	AP, Coaches, CFP, NFF^{††}	14–1	Won Fiesta Bowl (CFP Semifinal); Won CFP National Championship	No. 1	No. 1
2018	Dabo Swinney	AP, Coaches, CFP, NFF^{†††}	15–0	Won Cotton Bowl (CFP Semifinal); Won CFP National Championship	No. 1	No. 1

† Other selectors for 1981 included Berryman, Billingsley, DeVold, FACT, FB News, Football Research, Helms, Litkenhous, Matthews, National Championship Foundation, New York Times, Poling, Sagarin, and Sporting News
†† Other selectors for 2016 include A&H, BR, CCR, CFRA, DuS, MCFR, SR, W
††† Other selectors for 2018 include A&H, BR, CCR, CFRA, CM, DuS, MCFR, SR, W

=== Conference championships ===
Clemson won the Southern Intercollegiate Athletic Association in 1900 and 1902 (tied 1903 and 1906) along with the Southern Conference title in 1940 and 1948. Their 22 ACC titles (20 outright, 2 tied) are the most ACC football championships. In 1965, South Carolina violated participation rules relating to two ineligible players and was required to forfeit wins against North Carolina State and Clemson. North Carolina State and Clemson were then declared co-champions.

Year	Coach	Conference	Overall record	Conference record
1900	John Heisman	Southern Intercollegiate Athletic Association	6–0	4–0
1902	John Heisman	Southern Intercollegiate Athletic Association	6–1	6–0
1903†	John Heisman	Southern Intercollegiate Athletic Association	4–1–1	2–0–1
1906†	Bob Williams	Southern Intercollegiate Athletic Association	4–0–3	4–0
1940	Frank Howard	Southern Conference	6–2–1	4–0
1948	Frank Howard	Southern Conference	11–0	5–0
1956	Frank Howard	Atlantic Coast Conference	7–2–2	4–0–1
1958	Frank Howard	Atlantic Coast Conference	8–3	5–1
1959	Frank Howard	Atlantic Coast Conference	9–2	6–1
1965†	Frank Howard	Atlantic Coast Conference	5–5	5–2
1966	Frank Howard	Atlantic Coast Conference	6–4	6–1
1967	Frank Howard	Atlantic Coast Conference	6–4	6–0
1978	Charley Pell	Atlantic Coast Conference	11–1	6–0
1981	Danny Ford	Atlantic Coast Conference	12–0	6–0
1982	Danny Ford	Atlantic Coast Conference	9–1–1	6–0
1986	Danny Ford	Atlantic Coast Conference	8–2–2	5–1–1
1987	Danny Ford	Atlantic Coast Conference	10–2	6–1
1988	Danny Ford	Atlantic Coast Conference	10–2	6–1
1991	Ken Hatfield	Atlantic Coast Conference	9–2–1	6–0–1
2011	Dabo Swinney	Atlantic Coast Conference	10–4	6–2
2015	Dabo Swinney	Atlantic Coast Conference	14–1	8–0
2016	Dabo Swinney	Atlantic Coast Conference	14–1	7-1
2017	Dabo Swinney	Atlantic Coast Conference	12–2	7–1
2018	Dabo Swinney	Atlantic Coast Conference	15–0	8–0
2019	Dabo Swinney	Atlantic Coast Conference	14–1	8–0
2020	Dabo Swinney	Atlantic Coast Conference	10–2	8–1
2022	Dabo Swinney	Atlantic Coast Conference	11–3	8–0
2024	Dabo Swinney	Atlantic Coast Conference	10–4	7–1

† Co-champions

=== Division championships ===
In 2005, the Atlantic Coast Conference divided into two divisions of six teams each and began holding an ACC Championship Game at the conclusion of the regular football season to determine the conference champion. Clemson won its first outright ACC Atlantic Division championship in 2009. In 2012 and 2016, Clemson was co-champion of the Atlantic Division. On August 18, 2011, Georgia Tech vacated their 2009 ACC Championship Game victory over Clemson due to NCAA violations. The game is considered by the NCAA and ACC to have no winner.

Year	Coach	Division championship	Opponent	CG result
2009	Dabo Swinney	ACC Atlantic	Georgia Tech	L 34–39 (vacated)
2011	Dabo Swinney	ACC Atlantic	Virginia Tech	W 38–10
2015	Dabo Swinney	ACC Atlantic	North Carolina	W 45–37
2016	Dabo Swinney	ACC Atlantic	Virginia Tech	W 42–35
2017	Dabo Swinney	ACC Atlantic	Miami	W 38–3
2018	Dabo Swinney	ACC Atlantic	Pittsburgh	W 42–10
2019	Dabo Swinney	ACC Atlantic	Virginia	W 62–17
2022	Dabo Swinney	ACC Atlantic	North Carolina	W 39–10

== Playoffs ==
Clemson was selected as the one seed in the second College Football Playoff and defeated the fourth seed Oklahoma on December 31, 2015, in the 2015 Orange Bowl. They lost to the Alabama Crimson Tide in the championship game on January 11, 2016. Clemson was selected to the third College Football Playoff as the second seed and defeated the third seed Ohio State on December 31, 2016, in the 2016 PlayStation Fiesta Bowl. The Tigers defeated the Alabama Crimson Tide in the national championship games in both 2017 and 2019. Clemson has a 6–5 record in playoff games through the 2024 season.

Year	Seed	Opponent	Round	Result	Notes
2015	1	No. 4 Oklahoma	Semi-finals – Orange Bowl	W 37–17	notes
2015	1	No. 2 Alabama	Final – CFP National Championship Game	L 40–45	notes
2016	2	No. 3 Ohio State	Semi-finals – Fiesta Bowl	W 31–0	notes
2016	2	No. 1 Alabama	Final – CFP National Championship Game	W 35–31	notes
2017	1	No. 4 Alabama	Semi-finals – Sugar Bowl	L 6–24	notes
2018	2	No. 3 Notre Dame	Semi-finals – Cotton Bowl	W 30–3	notes
2018	2	No. 1 Alabama	Final – CFP National Championship Game	W 44–16	notes
2019	3	No. 2 Ohio State	Semi-finals – Fiesta Bowl	W 29–23	notes
2019	3	No. 1 LSU	Final – CFP National Championship Game	L 25–42	notes
2020	2	No. 3 Ohio State	Semi-finals – Sugar Bowl	L 28–49	notes
2024	12	No. 5 Texas	CFP First Round	L 24–38	notes

== National polls ==
Clemson has ended their football season ranked 38 times in either the AP or Coaches Poll.

Clemson had 12 consecutive 10-win seasons from 2011 to 2022. Before the streak came to an end in 2023, it was the 2nd longest active streak behind Alabama with 16.

Year	Record	AP Poll†	Coaches‡	Harris
1939	9–1–0	12	–	–
1948	11–0–0	11	–	–
1950	9–0–1	10	12	–
1951	7–3–0	20	–	–
1956	7–2–2	19	–	–
1957	7–3–0	–	18	–
1958	8–3–0	12	13	–
1959	9–2–0	11	11	–
1977	8–3–1	19	–	–
1978	11–1–0	6	7	–
1981	12–0–0	1	1	–
1982	9–1–1	8	–	–
1983	9–1–1	11	–	–
1986	8–2–2	17	19	–
1987	10–2–0	12	10	–
1988	10–2–0	9	8	–
1989	10–2–0	12	11	–
1990	10–2–0	9	9	–
1991	9–2–1	18	17	–
1993	9–3–0	23	22	–
2000	9–3	16	14	–
2003	9–4	22	22	–
2005	8–4	21	21	23
2007	9–4	21	22	16
2009	9–5	24	–	–
2011	10–4	22	22	14
2012	11–2	11	9	13
2013	11–2	8	7	11
2014	10–3	15	15	–
2015	14–1	2	2	
2016	14–1	1	1	
2017	12–2	4	4	
2018	15–0	1	1	
2019	14–1	2	2	
2020	10–2	3	3	
2021	10–3	14	16	
2022	11–3	12	13	
2023	9–4	20	20	
2024	10–4	14	11	

† AP Poll began selecting the nation's Top 20 teams in 1936. Only the Top 10 teams were recognized from 1962 to 1967. The AP Poll expanded back to the Top 20 teams in 1968. In 1989, it began recognizing the Top 25 teams.

‡ UPI/Coaches Poll began selecting its Top 20 teams on a weekly basis in 1950 before expanding to the nation's Top 25 teams in 1990.

== Bowl games ==
Clemson holds a 27–24 record in bowl games through the 2025 season. This is a list of Clemson's 16 most recent bowl games.

Season	Coach	Bowl	Date	Opponent	Result
2010	Dabo Swinney	Meineke Car Care Bowl	December 31, 2010	South Florida	L 26–31
2011	Dabo Swinney	Orange Bowl	January 4, 2012	West Virginia	L 33–70
2012	Dabo Swinney	Chick-fil-A Bowl	December 31, 2012	LSU	W 25–24
2013	Dabo Swinney	Orange Bowl	January 3, 2014	Ohio State	W 40–35
2014	Dabo Swinney	Russell Athletic Bowl	December 29, 2014	Oklahoma	W 40–6
2015	Dabo Swinney	Orange Bowl	December 31, 2015	Oklahoma	W 37–17
2015	Dabo Swinney	2016 CFP National Championship	January 11, 2016	Alabama	L 40–45
2016	Dabo Swinney	Fiesta Bowl	December 31, 2016	Ohio State	W 31–0
2016	Dabo Swinney	2017 CFP National Championship	January 9, 2017	Alabama	W 35–31
2017	Dabo Swinney	Sugar Bowl	January 1, 2018	Alabama	L 6–24
2018	Dabo Swinney	Cotton Bowl	December 29, 2018	Notre Dame	W 30–3
2018	Dabo Swinney	2019 CFP National Championship	January 7, 2019	Alabama	W 44–16
2019	Dabo Swinney	Fiesta Bowl	December 28, 2019	Ohio State	W 29–23
2019	Dabo Swinney	2020 CFP National Championship	January 13, 2020	LSU	L 25–42
2020	Dabo Swinney	Sugar Bowl	January 1, 2021	Ohio State	L 28–49
2021	Dabo Swinney	Cheez-It Bowl	December 29, 2021	Iowa State	W 20–13
2022	Dabo Swinney	Orange Bowl	December 30, 2022	Tennessee	L 14–31
2023	Dabo Swinney	Gator Bowl	December 29, 2023	Kentucky	W 38–35
2025	Dabo Swinney	Pinstripe Bowl	December 27, 2025	Penn State	L 10–22

== Head coaches ==
Tenure	Coach	Years	Record	Pct.
1896–1899	Walter M Riggs	2	6–3	.667
1897	William M. Williams	1	2–2	.500
1898	John A. Penton	1	3–1	.750
1900–1903	John W. Heisman	4	19–3–2	.833
1904	Shack Shealy	1	3–3–1	.500
1905	Edward B. "Eddie" Cochems	1	3–2–1	.583
1906–1915	Bob Williams	5	22–14–6	.595
1907	Frank J. Shaughnessy	1	4–4–0	.500
1908	Stein Stone	1	1–6–0	.143
1910–1912	Frank M. Dobson	3	11–12–1	.479
1916	Wayne Hart	1	3–6	.333
1917–1920	Edward A. Donahue	4	21–12–3	.625
1921–1922	Edward J. "Doc" Stewart	2	6–10–2	.389
1923–1926	Bud Saunders	4	10–22–1	.318
1927–1930	Josh C. Cody	4	29–11–1	.720
1931–1939	Jess C. Neely	9	43–35–7	.547
1940–1969	Frank Howard	30	165–118–12	.580
1970–1972	Hootie Ingram	3	12–21	.364
1973–1976	Jimmy "Red" Parker	4	17–25–2	.409
1977–1978	Charley Pell	2	18–4–1	.804
1978–1989	Danny Ford	12	96–29–4	.760
1990–1993	Ken Hatfield	4	32–13–1	.707
1993–1998	Tommy West	6	31–28	.525
1999–2008	Tommy Bowden	10	72–45	.615
2008–current	Dabo Swinney	17	180–47	.793

=== Coaching staff ===
Clemson Tigers
Name	Position	Consecutive season at Clemson in current position	Previous position
Garrett Riley	Offensive coordinator / quarterbacks	3rd	TCU – Offensive coordinator/ quarterbacks (2021–2022)
Tom Allen	Defensive coordinator / linebackers	1st	Penn State – Defensive coordinator (2024)
Mickey Conn	Defensive pass game coordinator, co-special teams coordinator, safeties	9th	Clemson – Safeties / special teams coordinator (2021)
Michael Reed	Special teams coordinator / cornerbacks	13th	Clemson – Defensive backs (2013–2021)
Matt Luke	Assistant head coach, co-offensive coordinator, offensive line	2nd	Georgia - Assistant head coach/offensive line (2020–2021)
Tyler Grisham	Offensive pass game coordinator, wide receivers	6th	Clemson – Offensive analyst (2016–2019)
C. J. Spiller	Offensive run game coordinator, running backs	5th	Clemson – Graduate intern (2020)
Kyle Richardson	Tight ends, co-offensive coordinator	4th	Clemson – Senior offensive assistant (2016–2021)
Nick Eason	Associate head coach, co-defensive coordinator, defensive tackles	4th	Auburn – Defensive line (2021)
Chris Rumph	Defensive run game coordinator, defensive ends	2nd	Minnesota Vikings - Defensive line (2022–2023)
Ben Boulware	Linebackers	1st	Clemson - Defensive intern (2024)
Joey Batson	Director of football strength & conditioning	27th	Furman – Director of strength training (1996)

== Clemson traditions ==
- Howard's Rock In the early 1960s, the rock was given to then head coach Frank Howard by a friend, Samuel Columbus Jones (Clemson Class of 1919). It was presented to Howard by Jones, saying "Here's a rock from Death Valley, California, to Death Valley, South Carolina." Howard didn't think anything else about the rock and it was used as a door stop in his office for several years. In September 1966, while cleaning out his office, Howard noticed the rock and told IPTAY executive director Gene Willimon, "Take this rock and throw it over the fence or out in the ditch...do something with it, but get it out of my office." Willimon had the rock placed on a pedestal at the top of the east endzone hill that the team ran down to enter the field for games. On September 24, 1966, the first time Clemson players ran by the rock, they beat conference rival Virginia, 40–35. Howard, seizing on the motivational potential of "The Rock", told his players, "Give me 110% or keep your filthy hands off of my rock." The team started rubbing the Rock for the first game of 1967, which was a 23–6 waxing of ACC foe Wake Forest.

As a result, it is now a tradition for the Clemson Army ROTC to protect the Rock for the 24 hours prior to the Clemson-South Carolina game when held in Death Valley. ROTC cadets keep a steady drum cadence around the rock prior to the game, which can be heard across the campus. Part of the tradition comes after unknown parties vandalized the Rock prior to the 1992 South Carolina-Clemson game. On June 2, 2013, Howard's Rock was again vandalized when the case containing it was broken and a portion of the rock was removed by an apparent fan of the Tigers, who was eventually arrested following a police investigation.

- Gathering at the Paw One of the most criticized and misunderstood traditions in all of college football is Clemson's "Gathering At The Paw." After every home football game, fans are allowed to come onto the field to sing the alma mater, and gather around the center of the field. While many say it's "rushing" the field, in truth it's more of a gathering as there is a clock that tells fans when they can come onto the field. There is time given for players and coaches to get off of the field. It is done after every home game, win or lose.
- Running Down the Hill Probably the most highly publicized tradition of the Clemson Tigers football team is the entrance, which Brent Musburger referred to as "The Most Exciting 25 seconds in College Football." Running down "The Hill" originally started out of practicality. Before the west stands were built, the football team dressed across the street at Fike Field House and ran from there to the gate and down the hill onto the field. Now, after exiting the stadium on the west side, the players load into buses which, escorted by police officers, make their way around the stadium to the east side where The Hill is located. This scene is shown on the JumboTron inside the stadium. When the buses arrive at the east side the players get out and gather at the top of the hill and stand around Howard's Rock; once most of the players are out of the buses and ready to go a cannon sounds; the band begins to play Tiger Rag and the players make their way down the hill. The spelling out of C-L-E-M-S-O-N during this Tiger Rag is one of, if not the, loudest times it will be spelled out during the game.
- Ring of Honor Created in 1994, the Ring of Honor is the highest award given to former coaches, players, and other individuals who made a direct impact on the football program.
- The Graveyard The Graveyard is a mock cemetery near the football practice fields that features tombstones commemorating Clemson's victories over ranked opponents on the road.
- First Friday Parade The Clemson football season kicks off each year with the annual First Friday Parade. The once a year event takes place on the Friday afternoon prior to the first home football game. Floats from various fraternities and sororities and other campus organizations are represented in the parade that rolls down main street in Clemson. The parade culminates at the Amphitheater in the middle of campus where the first Pep Rally of the year takes place. The Grand Marshal of the Parade is featured at the Pep Rally. Recent Grand Marshals have ranged from current PGA professional Dillard Pruitt, to College Football Hall of Fame legends Jess Neely and Frank Howard, to noted television announcers Brent Musburger and Ara Parseghian.
- Tailgating On October 15, 2012, Southern Living named Clemson the South's best tailgate.
- Military Appreciation Game This honors Clemson's history as a military school. The team wears purple uniforms (their secondary color) for the annual Military Appreciation Game.
- Tiger Walk Like many sports teams, the Tigers have a traditionally-styled Walk of Champions. In addition to this, however, they also have a more informal tradition referred to as the Tiger Walk.

== Rivalries ==
=== Alabama ===
The two southern schools have long, decorated histories in the sport of college football. They first met on the football field on November 29, 1900. Clemson won the inaugural matchup by a score of 35–0. The Crimson Tide and Tigers met again in 1904 and 1905, with Clemson winning both games. Beginning with the next meeting between the two squads in 1909, Alabama won the next thirteen matchups against Clemson. The Tide posted the biggest margin of victory in the rivalry in 1931, beating the Tigers by a margin of 74–7. In the first seven games of Alabama's 13-game streak, Clemson only scored seven total points and was shut out in six of the seven games. After a 56–0 shutout Alabama victory in 1975, the squads didn't meet again until 2008, when they squared off on opening weekend in Atlanta, Georgia. The Tide emerged victorious with a 34–10 victory.

The last four matchups between the squads have had national championship implications and have greatly re-intensified the rivalry. The teams squared off in the 2016 College Football Playoff National Championship in Glendale, Arizona, resulting in Alabama emerging with a thrilling 45–40 victory. The next year, the teams again found themselves doing battle in the 2017 College Football Playoff National Championship in Tampa, Florida, with Clemson emerging with a last-second 35–31 victory and their first win over the Crimson Tide since 1905. Once again the teams met in the 2018 Sugar Bowl semifinal in New Orleans, Louisiana with a trip to the 2018 College Football Playoff National Championship game on the line. Alabama won by a score of 24–6 following two costly Clemson interceptions in the second half. Their most recent meeting was in the 2019 College Football Playoff National Championship. This time, Clemson dismantled the No. 1-ranked Crimson Tide in a 44–16 rout to win its third national title.

Alabama leads the series 14–5 through the 2023 season.

=== Auburn ===
These old rivals (which are often called sister schools) first played in 1899, but until 2010, had not faced each other in the regular season since 1971. Along with snapping a 14-game losing streak to the Tigers of the Plains, Clemson also snapped Auburn's 17-game winning streak coming off of the 2009–2011 seasons after a home-and-home series in the 2010–11 seasons. The Georgia Dome then hosted the Auburn–Clemson rivalry the following year in the 2012 Chick-fil-A Kickoff Game. Clemson defeated Auburn 26–19 riding on a 231-yard performance by Andre Ellington. This game was notable due to Sammy Watkins' absence, having been suspended the first two games due to a drug-related arrest in May 2012. Auburn leads the overall series 34–15–2 through the 2018 season.

=== Boston College ===
The O'Rourke–McFadden Trophy was created in 2008 by the Boston College Gridiron Club to honor the tradition at both schools and to honor the legacy of Charlie O'Rourke and Banks McFadden, who played during the leather helmet era. The club plans to make this an annual presentation. Clemson first met Boston College on the football field in the 1940 Cotton Bowl Classic, the first ever bowl game for the Tigers and Eagles. Over the next 43 years, the teams met a total of 14 times. In 2005, Boston College joined the ACC and the Atlantic Division. Since then, the game has been played on an annual basis with Clemson winning the last 11 meetings. As of 2022 the Tigers lead the series 21–9–2.

=== Florida State ===
Between 1999 and 2007 the ACC Atlantic Division matchup between Clemson and Florida State was referred to as the "Bowden Bowl" to reflect the father-son head coach matchup between Bobby Bowden (Father, FSU) and Tommy Bowden (Son, Clemson). Their first meeting, in 1999, was the first time in Division I-A history that a father and a son met as opposing head coaches in a football game. Bobby Bowden won the first four matchups extending FSU's winning streak over Clemson to 11 dating back to 1992. Since 2003, Clemson is 11–6, including a 26–10 win in Clemson over then-No. 3 FSU. Also during this time the Tigers recorded a 27–20 win in Tallahassee in 2006 which broke a 17-year losing streak in Doak Campbell Stadium. 2007 was the last Bowden Bowl game as Tommy resigned as head coach in October 2008. No. 3 Clemson pulled off a thriller in Tallahassee in 2016, 37–34, over the No. 12-ranked Seminoles. In 2018, No. 2 Clemson defeated Florida State in Tallahassee 59–10, which tied the Seminoles' worst loss margin in history. This marked a 2nd time the Tigers have beaten the Seminoles by more than 17-points. Clemson did it again in 2019, beating FSU 45–14. FSU has defeated Clemson by more than 17-points nine times. The most lopsided contest occurred in 1993, with the FSU squad winning 57–0. As of 2022, Florida State leads the overall series 20–15. Before the dissolution of divisions in ACC Football as of 2023, the annual Clemson-Florida State game often decided which team would represent the Atlantic Division in the ACC Championship. However, under the ACC's new scheduling system, Clemson and Florida State are designated as permanent rivals and will continue to compete for the title every year. Because of the new ACC scheduling system, there is a chance these rivals could face each other a second time in the ACC Championship.

=== Georgia ===
The Bulldogs and the Tigers have played each other 64 times beginning in 1897, with the 64th meeting played in 2014. Clemson's only regular-season losses of the 1978, 1982, and 1991 campaigns all came at the hands of Georgia "between the hedges", whereas Georgia's only regular-season setback during the three years of the Herschel Walker era came in Death Valley during Danny Ford's 1981 national championship run.

During the two programs' simultaneous glory days of the early 1980s, no rivalry in all of college football was more important at the national level. The Bulldogs and Tigers played each other every season from 1973 to 1987, with Scott Woerner's dramatic returns in 1980 and the nine turnovers forced by the Tigers in 1981 effectively settling the eventual national champion. No rivalry of that period was more competitive, as evidenced by the critical 11th-hour field goals kicked by Kevin Butler in 1984 and by David Treadwell more than once later in the decade. Despite blowouts in 1990 by the Tigers and in 1994 and 2003 by the Bulldogs, the series typically has remained very competitive with evenly matched games. Most recently, Georgia defeated Clemson 10–3 in the 2021 Duke's Mayo Classic with neither team scoring an offensive touchdown; Georgia went on to win the national title in 2021. The Bulldogs maintains a 43–18–4 lead in the series.

=== Georgia Tech ===
Clemson's rivalry with Georgia Tech dates to 1898 with the first game being played in Augusta, Georgia. Notably, both programs share the privilege of having John Heisman as a former coach. It was played in Atlanta for 44 of the first 47 match-ups, until Georgia Tech joined the ACC. When the Yellowjackets joined the ACC in 1978, the series moved to a more traditional home-and-home setup beginning with the 1983 game. When the ACC expanded to 12 teams and split into two divisions in 2005, Clemson and Georgia Tech were placed in opposite divisions but were designated permanent cross-divisional rivals so that the series may continue uninterrupted. In the new system without divisions, they remain as such. The two schools are 127 miles apart and connected to each other by Interstate 85. This distance is slightly closer than that between Clemson and traditional rival South Carolina (137 miles). Georgia Tech leads the series 51–35–2.

=== NC State ===
The yearly conference and divisional match-up with NC State is known as the Textile Bowl for the schools' similar missions in research and development for the textile industry in the Carolinas. The first meeting of the two schools occurred in 1899. Clemson has won 18 out of 23 contests since 2000. It is a particularly bitter rivalry amongst fans and students of both schools, even though it is not as competitive as the vitriol would suggest, though statistically more competitive than the rivalries with Alabama, Auburn, Boston College and Georgia. Clemson holds a 60–30–1 series advantage through the 2023 season. NC State has won 2 out of the last 3 games in the rivalry.

=== South Carolina ===
The Clemson–South Carolina rivalry, which dates back to 1896, is the largest annual sporting event in terms of ticket sales in the state of South Carolina. From 1896 to 1959, the Clemson–South Carolina game was played on the fairgrounds in Columbia, South Carolina and was referred to as "Big Thursday." Beginning in 1960, an alternating-site format was implemented using both teams' home stadiums. The annual game has since been designated "The Palmetto Bowl." The last eight contests between the programs have been nationally televised (4 on ESPN, 4 on ESPN2). Clemson holds a 73–44-4 lead in the series through the 2024 season. It is often considered one of the most heated rivalries in all of college football, on a similar level to the Auburn-Alabama and Ohio State-Michigan rivalries, respectively.

== Individual award winners ==
=== College Football Hall of Fame inductees ===
In 1951, the College Football Hall of Fame opened in South Bend, Indiana. Clemson has had 3 players and 4 former coaches inducted into the Hall of Fame.

Name	Years	Position	Inducted	Ref.
John Heisman	1900–1903	Head coach	1954	
Banks McFadden	1937–1939	RB	1959	
Jess Neely	1931–1939	Head coach	1971	
Frank Howard	1940–1969	Head coach	1989	
Terry Kinard	1978–1982	S	2001	
Jeff Davis	1978–1981	LB	2007	
Danny Ford	1978–1989	Head coach	2017	
C. J. Spiller	2006–2009	Running back	2021	

=== Retired numbers ===
Clemson Tigers retired numbers
No.	Player	Pos.	Tenure	Year retired	Ref.
4	Steve Fuller (Note: No. 4 was brought out of retirement in 2014 to be worn by quarterback Deshaun Watson.)	1975–1978	QB	1979	
28	C. J. Spiller (Note: Number 28 was brought out of retirement in 2016 to be worn by running back Tavien Feaster, with Spiller's blessing.)	2006–2009	RB	2010	
66	Banks McFadden (Note: McFadden's has also his #23 retired in Clemson's basketball.)	1937–1939	HB	1987	

=== National award winners ===
- CBS/Chevrolet Defensive Player of the Year
  Terry Kinard (1982)
- Ted Hendricks Award
  Da'Quan Bowers (2010)
  Clelin Ferrell (2018)
- Bronko Nagurski Trophy
  Da'Quan Bowers (2010)
- John Mackey Award
  Dwayne Allen (2011)
- Freshman of the Year
  Sammy Watkins (2011)
  Trevor Lawrence (2018)
- Archie Griffin Award
  Deshaun Watson (2015)
  Trevor Lawrence (2018)
- Davey O'Brien Award
  Deshaun Watson (2015, 2016)
- Manning Award
  Deshaun Watson (2015, 2016)
- Chic Harley Award
  Deshaun Watson (2016)
- Bobby Bowden Trophy
  Deshaun Watson (2016)
  Hunter Renfrow (2018)
- Johnny Unitas Award
  Deshaun Watson (2016)
- Jack Lambert Award
  Ben Boulware (2016)
- Bill Willis Trophy
  Christian Wilkins (2017)
- William V. Campbell Trophy
  Christian Wilkins (2018)
- Burlsworth Trophy
  Hunter Renfrow (2018)
- Butkus Award
  Isaiah Simmons (2019)

=== National coaching awards ===
- AFCA Coach of the Year
  Danny Ford (1981)
  Dabo Swinney (2015)
- AFCA Assistant Coach of the Year
  Chad Morris (2013)
  Dan Brooks (2016)
- AP Coach of the Year
  Dabo Swinney (2015)
- Bobby Dodd Coach of the Year
  Dabo Swinney (2011)
- Frank Broyles Award
  Brent Venables (2016)
  Tony Elliott (2017)
- Grant Teaff Award
  Dabo Swinney (2014)
- Home Depot Coach of the Year
  Dabo Swinney (2015)
- Eddie Robinson Coach of the Year
  Danny Ford (1981)
- Paul "Bear" Bryant Award
  Dabo Swinney (2015, 2016, 2018)
- George Munger Award
  Dabo Swinney (2015)
- Sporting News College Coach of the Year
  Dabo Swinney (2015)
- Walter Camp Coach of the Year
  Dabo Swinney (2015)
- Woody Hayes Trophy
  Danny Ford (1981)
  Dabo Swinney (2018)

=== Consensus All-Americans ===
The NCAA recognizes All-Americans selected by the Associated Press (AP), American Football Coaches Association (AFCA), Football Writers Association of America (FWAA), The Sporting News (TSN), and the Walter Camp Football Foundation (WCFF) to determine if a player is regarded as a Consensus or Unanimous All-American. To be selected a Consensus All-American, a player must be chosen to the first team on at least three of the five official selectors as recognized by the NCAA. If a player is named an All-American by all five organizations, he is recognized as a Unanimous All-America. Clemson players have been honored 28 times as Consensus All-Americans, and 6 times as Unanimous All-Americas.

Year(s)	Name	Number	Position
1967	Harry Olszewski	51	G
1974	Bennie Cunningham	85	TE
1979	Jim Stuckey	83	DL
1981	Jeff Davis	45	LB
1981–1982†	Terry Kinard	43	DB
1983	William Perry	66	DL
1986	Terrence Flagler	33	RB
1987	David Treadwell	18	PK
1988	Donnell Woolford	20	DB
1990	Stacy Long	67	OL
1991	Jeb Flesch	59	OL
1991	Levon Kirkland	44	LB
1993	Stacy Seegars	79	OL
1997	Anthony Simmons	41	LB
2000	Keith Adams	43	LB
2005	Tye Hill	8	DB
2006†	Gaines Adams	93	DL
2009†	C. J. Spiller	28	KR/AP
2010†	Da'Quan Bowers	93	DL
2011	Dwayne Allen	83	TE
2013–2014	Vic Beasley	3	DL
2015	Deshaun Watson	4	QB
2015	Shaq Lawson	90	DL
2018	Clelin Ferrell	99	DL
2018	Mitch Hyatt	75	OL
2018†	Christian Wilkins	42	DL
2019†	Isaiah Simmons	11	LB
2019	John Simpson	74	OL
2020	Travis Etienne	9	AP

† Unanimous All-American

=== Atlantic Coast Conference awards ===
- ACC Player of the Year
  Buddy Gore (1967)
  Steve Fuller (1977, 1978)
  Jeff Davis (1981)
  William Perry (1984)
  Michael Dean Perry (1987)
  C. J. Spiller (2009)
  Tajh Boyd (2012)
  Deshaun Watson (2015)
  Travis Etienne (2018, 2019)
  Trevor Lawrence (2020)
- ACC Coach of the Year
  Frank Howard (1958, 1966)
  Red Parker (1974)
  Charley Pell (1977, 1978)
  Danny Ford (1981)
  Tommy Bowden (1999, 2003)
  Dabo Swinney (2015, 2018)
- ACC Offensive Player of the Year
  C. J. Spiller (2009)
  Tajh Boyd (2012)
  Deshaun Watson (2015)
  Travis Etienne (2018, 2019)
  Trevor Lawrence (2020)
- ACC Defensive Player of the Year
  Keith Adams (1999)
  Leroy Hill (2004)
  Gaines Adams (2006)
  Da'Quan Bowers (2010)
  Vic Beasley (2014)
  Ben Boulware (2016)
  Clelin Ferrell (2018)
  Isaiah Simmons (2019)
- ACC Rookie of the Year
  Chuck McSwain (1979)
  Terry Allen (1987)
  Ronald Williams (1990)
  Anthony Simmons (1995)
  James Davis (2005)
  Sammy Watkins (2011)
  Trevor Lawrence (2018)
- ACC Offensive Rookie of the Year
  Sammy Watkins (2011)
  Trevor Lawrence (2018)
- ACC Defensive Rookie of the Year
  Dexter Lawrence (2016)
  Bryan Bresee (2020)
  Andrew Mukuba (2021)
  Sammy Brown (2024)
- ACC Jacobs Blocking Trophy
  Doug Cline (1959)
  Wayne Mass (1966)
  Harry Olszewski (1967)
  Joe Bostic (1977)
  Lee Nanney (1981)
  James Farr (1983)
  John Phillips (1987)
  Mitch Hyatt (2017, 2018)
  Jordan McFadden (2022)
- ACC Brian Piccolo Award
  Rex Varn (1978)
  Jack Cain (1980)
  Ray Williams (1986)
  Warren Forney (1995)
  Justyn Ross (2021)
- ACC Jim Tatum Award
  Ed Glenn (1994)
  Kyle Young (2001)
  Christian Wilkins (2018)

=== Atlantic Coast Conference 50th Anniversary football team ===
On July 23, 2002, in celebration of the Atlantic Coast Conference's 50th Anniversary, a 120-member blue ribbon committee selected the Top 50 football players in ACC history. Clemson led all conference schools with the most players selected to the Golden Anniversary team. Each of Clemson's honorees are All-Americans and former NFL players. The nine selectees from Clemson are:

- Joe Bostic (1975–1978)
- Jerry Butler (1975–1978)
- Bennie Cunningham (1973–1975)
- Jeff Davis (1978–1981)
- Steve Fuller (1975–1978)
- Terry Kinard (1978–1982)
- Michael Dean Perry (1984–1987)
- William Perry (1981–1984)
- Anthony Simmons (1995–1997)

== NFL players ==
Source ESPN

- Davis Allen – TE, Los Angeles Rams No. 87
- Bryan Bresee – DT, New Orleans Saints No. 90
- Jake Briningstool – TE, Kansas City Chiefs No. 88
- DeMonte Capehart – DT, Tampa Bay Buccaneers No. 90
- Barrett Carter – LB, Cincinnati Bengals No. 49
- Tyler Davis – DT, Los Angeles Rams No. 90
- Travis Etienne – RB, New Orleans Saints No. 3
- Clelin Ferrell – DE, Miami Dolphins No. 98
- Tee Higgins – WR, Cincinnati Bengals No. 5
- Grady Jarrett – DT, Chicago Bears No. 50
- Cade Klubnik – QB, New York Jets No. 10
- Dexter Lawrence – DT, Cincinnati Bengals No. 97
- Trevor Lawrence – QB, Jacksonville Jaguars No. 16
- Phil Mafah – RB, New York Giants No. 36
- Jordan McFadden – OT, Chicago Bears No. 74
- R. J. Mickens – S, Los Angeles Chargers No. 27
- Blake Miller – OT, Detroit Lions No. 76
- Myles Murphy – DE, Cincinnati Bengals No. 99
- Ruke Orhorhoro – DT, Jacksonville Jaguars No. 99
- Payton Page – DT, New York Jets No. 98
- T. J. Parker – DE, Buffalo Bills No. 99
- Bradley Pinion – P, Miami Dolphins No. 48
- Will Putnam – C, Las Vegas Raiders No. 67
- Adam Randall – RB, Baltimore Ravens No. 23
- D. J. Reader – DT, New York Giants No. 98
- Will Shipley – RB, Philadelphia Eagles No. 28
- Isaiah Simmons – LB, Carolina Panthers No. 27
- John Simpson – OG, Baltimore Ravens No. 74
- Trenton Simpson – LB, Baltimore Ravens No. 32
- A. J. Terrell – CB, Atlanta Falcons No. 24
- Avieon Terrell – CB, Atlanta Falcons No. 12
- Jeremiah Trotter Jr. – LB, Philadelphia Eagles No. 54
- K’Von Wallace – S, Baltimore Ravens No. 25
- Deshaun Watson – QB, Cleveland Browns No. 4
- Nate Wiggins – CB, Baltimore Ravens No. 2
- Antonio Williams – WR, Washington Commanders No. 14
- Wade Woodaz – LB, Houston Texans No. 30
- Peter Woods – DT, Kansas City Chiefs No. 99

== All-time record vs. current ACC teams ==
Opponent	Won	Lost	Tied	Percentage	Streak	First meeting	Last meeting
Boston College	21	9	2	.688	Won 11	1940	2022
California	0	1	0	.000	Lost 1	1991	1991
Duke	37	17	1	.682	Lost 1	1934	2023
Florida State	16	21	0	.432	Won 1	1970	2024
Georgia Tech	36	51	2	.416	Lost 1	1898	2025
Louisville	8	1	0	.889	Lost 1	2014	2024
Miami	7	7	0	.500	Lost 1	1945	2023
North Carolina	40	19	1	.675	Won 6	1897	2023
NC State	61	30	1	.668	Won 1	1899	2024
Notre Dame	5	3	0	.625	Won 1	1977	2023
Pittsburgh	3	3	0	.500	Won 1	1977	2024
SMU	1	0	0	1.000	Won 1	2024	2024
Stanford	2	0	0	1.000	Won 2	1986	2024
Syracuse	10	2	0	.833	Won 6	1995	2023
Virginia	41	8	1	.830	Won 5	1955	2024
Virginia Tech	24	12	1	.662	Won 7	1900	2024
Wake Forest	72	17	1	.806	Won 16	1933	2024
Totals	371	197	10	.651			

Due to the COVID-19 pandemic, the ACC temporarily added Notre Dame as a member for just the 2020 season. Wins and losses to Notre Dame in 2020 count toward standings and all-time records.

== Future non-conference opponents ==
Announced schedules as of September 22, 2026.

2026	2027	2028	2029	2030	2031
at LSU	Georgia State	Troy	Notre Dame		Notre Dame
Georgia Southern	Wofford	The Citadel	Furman	at Notre Dame	at South Carolina
Charleston Southern	Notre Dame	at Notre Dame	at South Carolina	South Carolina	
South Carolina	at South Carolina	South Carolina			

2032	2033	2034	2035	2036	2037
		East Carolina	Oklahoma	at Oklahoma	
at Notre Dame	Notre Dame	at Notre Dame	Notre Dame	at Notre Dame	Notre Dame
South Carolina	at South Carolina	South Carolina	at South Carolina	South Carolina	at South Carolina

== Clemson vs. in-state NCAA Division I teams ==
School	Record	Percentage	Streak	First meeting	Last meeting
Charleston Southern Buccaneers	2–0	1.000	Won 2	2023	2026
Coastal Carolina Chanticleers	1–0	1.000	Won 1	2009	2009
Furman Paladins	45–10–4	.797	Won 32	1896	2025
Presbyterian Blue Hose	33–3–4	.875	Won 15	1916	2010
South Carolina Gamecocks	74–44–4	.623	Won 1	1896	2025
South Carolina State Bulldogs	5–0	1.000	Won 5	2008	2021
The Citadel Bulldogs	34–5–1	.863	Won 19	1909	2024
Wofford Terriers	13–3	.813	Won 6	1896	2019

== Recruiting ==
Clemson Tigers Football Rivals.com team recruitment rankings under head coach Dabo Swinney:

Year	National rank	Commits
2024	10th	22
2023	10th	22
2023	10th	26
2022	10th	20
2021	6th	19
2020	2nd	23
2019	9th	28
2018	8th	17
2017	22nd	14
2016	6th	22
2015	4th	25
2014	13th	22
2013	14th	23
2012	14th	20
2011	8th	29
2010	19th	24
2009	37th	12
