= Clemson Tigers football statistical leaders =

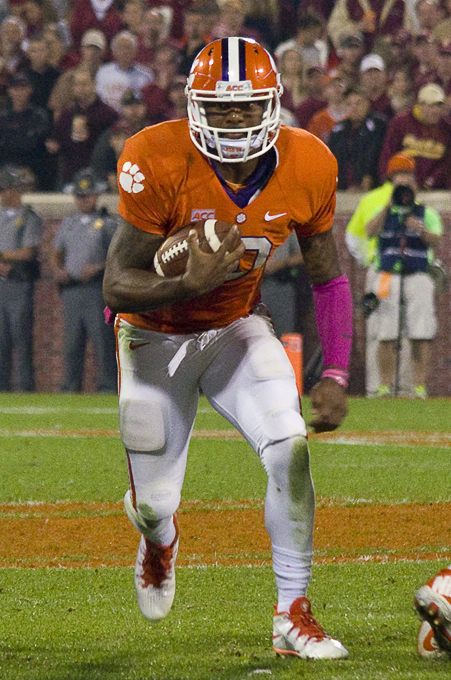
Quarterback Tajh Boyd holds Clemson's career passing and total offense records.

The Clemson Tigers football statistical leaders are individual statistical leaders of the Clemson Tigers football program in various categories, including passing, rushing, receiving, total offense, defensive stats, kicking, and scoring. Within those areas, the lists identify single-game, single-season, and career leaders. The Tigers represent Clemson University in the NCAA's Atlantic Coast Conference (ACC).

Although Clemson began competing in intercollegiate football in 1896, the school's official record book does not generally include statistics from before the 1940s, as records from before this time are often incomplete and inconsistent.

These lists are dominated by more recent players for several reasons:

- Since the 1940s, seasons have increased from 10 games to 11 and then 12 games in length.
- The NCAA didn't allow freshmen to play varsity football until 1972 (with the exception of the World War II years), allowing players to have four-year careers.
- Bowl games only began counting toward single-season and career statistics in 2002. The Tigers have played in 22 bowl games since this decision, including two in 2015, 2016, 2018, and 2019, giving many recent players extra games to accumulate statistics. Similarly, the Tigers have played in the ACC Championship Game seven times since 2009.
- The Tigers have topped the 5,000-yard mark 17 times in school history, with ten of those coming since 2010. The Tigers eclipsed 6,000 offensive yards for the first time in 2011 and have now done it nine times. The Tigers set an offensive record in 2019, with 7,931 yards, their fourth year eclipsing the 7,000-yard mark, overtaking 2018's 7,908 yards. In 2015 they gained 7,718 yards and nearly matched it with 7,555 yards in 2016. This means more recent players will tend to dominate offensive lists.

These lists are updated through the Tigers' game against Ohio State on January 1, 2021.

== Passing ==
=== Passing yards ===
Career
Rank	Player	Yards	Years
1	Tajh Boyd	11,904	2010 2011 2012 2013
2	Deshaun Watson	10,163	2014 2015 2016
3	Cade Klubnik	10,123	2022 2023 2024 2025
4	Trevor Lawrence	10,098	2018 2019 2020
5	Charlie Whitehurst	9,665	2002 2003 2004 2005
6	Woodrow Dantzler	6,037	1998 1999 2000 2001
7	Cullen Harper	5,762	2005 2006 2007 2008
8	Nealon Greene	5,719	1994 1995 1996 1997
9	DJ Uiagalelei	5,681	2020 2021 2022
10	Kyle Parker	4,739	2009 2010

Single season
Rank	Player	Yards	Year
1	Deshaun Watson	4,593	2016
2	Deshaun Watson	4,104	2015
3	Tajh Boyd	3,896	2012
4	Tajh Boyd	3,851	2013
5	Tajh Boyd	3,828	2011
6	Trevor Lawrence	3,665	2019
7	Cade Klubnik	3,639	2024
8	Charlie Whitehurst	3,561	2003
9	Trevor Lawrence	3,280	2018
10	Trevor Lawrence	3,153	2020

Single game
Rank	Player	Yards	Year	Opponent
1	Deshaun Watson	580	2016	Pittsburgh
2	Tajh Boyd	455	2013	Syracuse
3	DJ Uiagalelei	439	2020	Notre Dame
4	Deshaun Watson	435	2014	North Carolina
5	Tajh Boyd	428	2012	Wake Forest
6	Tajh Boyd	426	2012	NC State
7	Charlie Whitehurst	420	2002	Duke
	Deshaun Watson	420	2015	Boston College
	Deshaun Watson	420	2016	Alabama (CFP National Championship)
10	Deshaun Watson	405	2015	Alabama (CFP National Championship)

=== Passing touchdowns ===
Career
Rank	Player	TDs	Years
1	Tajh Boyd	107	2010 2011 2012 2013
2	Deshaun Watson	90	2014 2015 2016
	Trevor Lawrence	90	2018 2019 2020
4	Cade Klubnik	73	2022 2023 2024 2025
5	Charlie Whitehurst	49	2002 2003 2004 2005
6	Cullen Harper	42	2005 2006 2007 2008
7	Woodrow Dantzler	41	1998 1999 2000 2001
8	DJ Uiagalelei	36	2020 2021 2022
9	Nealon Greene	35	1994 1995 1996 1997
10	Kyle Parker	32	2009 2010

Single season
Rank	Player	TDs	Year
1	Deshaun Watson	41	2016
2	Tajh Boyd	36	2012
	Trevor Lawrence	36	2019
	Cade Klubnik	36	2024
5	Deshaun Watson	35	2015
6	Tajh Boyd	34	2013
7	Tajh Boyd	33	2011
8	Trevor Lawrence	30	2018
9	Cullen Harper	27	2007
10	Trevor Lawrence	24	2020

Single game
Rank	Player	TDs	Year	Opponent
1	Deshaun Watson	6	2016	South Carolina
2	Cullen Harper	5	2007	Louisiana–Monroe
	Cullen Harper	5	2007	Central Michigan
	Tajh Boyd	5	2011	North Carolina
	Tajh Boyd	5	2012	Wake Forest
	Tajh Boyd	5	2012	Duke
	Tajh Boyd	5	2012	NC State
	Tajh Boyd	5	2013	Syracuse
	Tajh Boyd	5	2013	The Citadel
	Tajh Boyd	5	2013	Ohio State (Orange Bowl)
	Deshaun Watson	5	2015	NC State
	Deshaun Watson	5	2016	Louisville
	Trevor Lawrence	5	2020	Georgia Tech
	DJ Uiagalelei	5	2022	Wake Forest
	Cade Klubnik	5	2024	Appalachian State

== Rushing ==
=== Rushing yards ===
Career
Rank	Player	Yards	Years
1	Travis Etienne	4,952	2017 2018 2019 2020
2	Raymond Priester	3,966	1994 1995 1996 1997
3	James Davis	3,881	2005 2006 2007 2008
4	C. J. Spiller	3,547	2006 2007 2008 2009
5	Andre Ellington	3,436	2009 2010 2011 2012
6	Wayne Gallman	3,429	2014 2015 2016
7	Travis Zachery	3,043	1998 1999 2000 2001
8	Kenny Flowers	2,914	1983 1984 1985 1986
9	Phil Mafah	2,887	2021 2022 2023 2024
10	Terry Allen	2,778	1987 1988 1989

Single season
Rank	Player	Yards	Year
1	Travis Etienne	1,658	2018
2	Travis Etienne	1,614	2019
3	Wayne Gallman	1,527	2015
4	Raymond Priester	1,345	1996
5	Raymond Priester	1,322	1995
6	Terrence Flagler	1,258	1986
7	C. J. Spiller	1,212	2009
8	Kenny Flowers	1,200	1985
9	Terry Allen	1,192	1988
10	James Davis	1,187	2006

Single game
Rank	Player	Yards	Year	Opponent
1	Raymond Priester	263	1995	Duke
2	Cliff Austin	260	1982	Duke
3	Don King	234	1952	Fordham
4	C. J. Spiller	233	2009	Georgia Tech (ACC Championship Game)
5	Andre Ellington	228	2012	Auburn
6	Wesley McFadden	226	1987	Virginia Tech
7	Woodrow Dantzler	220	2000	Virginia
8	James Davis	216	2006	Georgia Tech
9	Andre Ellington	212	2011	Maryland
	Travis Etienne	212	2019	Wofford

=== Rushing touchdowns ===
Career
Rank	Player	TDs	Years
1	Travis Etienne	70	2017 2018 2019 2020
2	James Davis	47	2005 2006 2007 2008
3	Travis Zachery	41	1998 1999 2000 2001
4	Wayne Gallman	34	2014 2015 2016
5	Andre Ellington	33	2009 2010 2011 2012
6	C. J. Spiller	32	2006 2007 2008 2009
7	Lester Brown	31	1976 1977 1978 1979
	Will Shipley	31	2021 2022 2023
9	Fred Cone	30	1948 1949 1950
10	Phil Mafah	28	2021 2022 2023 2024

Single season
Rank	Player	TDs	Year
1	Travis Etienne	24	2018
2	Travis Etienne	19	2019
3	Lester Brown	17	1978
	James Davis	17	2006
	Wayne Gallman	17	2016
6	Travis Zachery	16	1999
7	Will Shipley	15	2022
8	Fred Cone	14	1950
	Cliff Austin	14	1982
	Emory Smith	14	1995
	Travis Etienne	14	2020

Single game
Rank	Player	TDs	Year	Opponent
1	C. J. Spiller	4	2009	Georgia Tech (ACC Championship Game)
	Phil Mafah	4	2023	Kentucky (Gator Bowl)

== Receiving ==
=== Receptions ===
Career
Rank	Player	Rec	Years
1	Artavis Scott	245	2014 2015 2016
2	Sammy Watkins	240	2011 2012 2013
3	Aaron Kelly	232	2005 2006 2007 2008
4	Antonio Williams	207	2022 2023 2024 2025
5	DeAndre Hopkins	206	2010 2011 2012
6	Hunter Renfrow	186	2015 2016 2017 2018
7	Amari Rodgers	181	2017 2018 2019 2020
8	Mike Williams	177	2013 2014 2015 2016
9	Derrick Hamilton	163	2001 2002 2003
10	Terry Smith	162	1990 1991 1992 1993

Single season
Rank	Player	Rec	Year
1	Sammy Watkins	101	2013
2	Mike Williams	98	2016
3	Artavis Scott	93	2015
4	Aaron Kelly	88	2007
5	Sammy Watkins	82	2011
	DeAndre Hopkins	82	2012
7	Rod Gardner	80	1999
8	Amari Rodgers	77	2020
9	Artavis Scott	76	2014
	Artavis Scott	76	2016

Single game
Rank	Player	Rec	Year	Opponent
1	Sammy Watkins	16	2013	Ohio State (Orange Bowl)
2	Mike Williams	15	2016	Pittsburgh
3	Sammy Watkins	14	2013	Maryland
4	DeAndre Hopkins	13	2012	Auburn
	DeAndre Hopkins	13	2012	LSU (Peach Bowl)
	Artavis Scott	13	2016	Pittsburgh
	Antonio Williams	13	2024	Pittsburgh
8	Airese Currie	12	2003	Middle Tennessee
	Artavis Scott	12	2015	Syracuse
	Mike Williams	12	2016	NC State

=== Receiving yards ===
Career
Rank	Player	Yards	Years
1	Sammy Watkins	3,391	2011 2012 2013
2	DeAndre Hopkins	3,020	2010 2011 2012
3	Aaron Kelly	2,733	2005 2006 2007 2008
4	Mike Williams	2,727	2013 2014 2015 2016
5	Terry Smith	2,681	1990 1991 1992 1993
6	Perry Tuttle	2,534	1978 1979 1980 1981
7	Artavis Scott	2,480	2014 2015 2016
8	Tee Higgins	2,448	2017 2018 2019
9	Rod Gardner	2,404	1997 1998 1999 2000
10	Justyn Ross	2,379	2018 2019 2021

Single season
Rank	Player	Yards	Year
1	Sammy Watkins	1,464	2013
2	DeAndre Hopkins	1,405	2012
3	Mike Williams	1,361	2016
4	Sammy Watkins	1,219	2011
5	Tee Higgins	1,167	2019
6	Rod Gardner	1,084	1999
7	Aaron Kelly	1,081	2007
8	Rod Gardner	1,050	2000
9	Mike Williams	1,030	2014
10	Derrick Hamilton	1,026	2003

Single game
Rank	Player	Yards	Year	Opponent
1	Sammy Watkins	227	2013	Ohio State (Orange Bowl)
2	Sammy Watkins	202	2012	Wake Forest
	Mike Williams	202	2016	Pittsburgh
4	DeAndre Hopkins	197	2012	Boston College
5	DeAndre Hopkins	191	2012	LSU (Peach Bowl)
6	Artavis Scott	185	2014	South Carolina
7	Rod Gardner	182	2000	North Carolina
	Tee Higgins	182	2019	Virginia
9	Tee Higgins	178	2017	The Citadel
10	Martavis Bryant	176	2013	Georgia Tech
	Cornell Powell	176	2020	Pittsburgh

=== Receiving touchdowns ===
Career
Rank	Player	TDs	Years
1	DeAndre Hopkins	27	2010 2011 2012
	Sammy Watkins	27	2011 2012 2013
	Tee Higgins	27	2017 2018 2019
4	Mike Williams	21	2013 2014 2015 2016
	Antonio Williams	21	2022 2023 2024 2025
6	Aaron Kelly	20	2005 2006 2007 2008
	Deon Cain	20	2015 2016 2017
	Justyn Ross	20	2018 2019 2021
9	Artavis Scott	19	2014 2015 2016
10	Jordan Leggett	18	2013 2014 2015 2016
	Glenn Smith	18	1949 1950 1951

Single season
Rank	Player	TDs	Year
1	DeAndre Hopkins	18	2012
2	Tee Higgins	13	2019
3	Sammy Watkins	12	2013
	Sammy Watkins	12	2011
	Tee Higgins	12	2018
6	Aaron Kelly	11	2007
	Mike Williams	11	2016
	Antonio Williams	11	2024
9	Derrick Hamilton	10	2003
10	Deon Cain	9	2016
	Justyn Ross	9	2018

Single game
Rank	Player	TDs	Year	Opponent
1	DeAndre Hopkins	3	2012	Ball State
	DeAndre Hopkins	3	2012	Duke
	Mike Williams	3	2016	South Carolina
	Tee Higgins	3	2019	Wake Forest
	Diondre Overton	3	2019	Boston College
	Tee Higgins	3	2019	Virginia

== Total offense ==
Total offense is the sum of passing and rushing statistics. It does not include receiving or returns.

=== Total offense yards ===
Career
Rank	Player	Yards	Years
1	Tajh Boyd	13,069	2010 2011 2012 2013
2	Deshaun Watson	12,097	2014 2015 2016
3	Trevor Lawrence	11,041	2018 2019 2020
4	Cade Klubnik	11,001	2022 2023 2024 2025
5	Charlie Whitehurst	9,763	2002 2003 2004 2005
6	Woodrow Dantzler	8,798	1998 1999 2000 2001
7	Nealon Greene	6,785	1994 1995 1996 1997
8	DJ Uiagalelei	6,594	2020 2021 2022
9	Steve Fuller	6,096	1975 1976 1977 1978
10	Cullen Harper	5,549	2005 2006 2007 2008

Single season
Rank	Player	Yards	Year
1	Deshaun Watson	5,222	2016
2	Deshaun Watson	5,209	2015
3	Tajh Boyd	4,410	2012
4	Tajh Boyd	4,251	2013
5	Trevor Lawrence	4,228	2019
6	Cade Klubnik	4,102	2024
7	Tajh Boyd	4,046	2011
8	Woodrow Dantzler	3,639	2001
9	Charlie Whitehurst	3,610	2003
10	Kelly Bryant	3,467	2017

Single game
Rank	Player	Yards	Year	Opponent
1	Tajh Boyd	529	2012	NC State
2	Woodrow Dantzler	517	2001	NC State
3	Tajh Boyd	505	2013	Ohio State (Orange Bowl)
4	Deshaun Watson	478	2015	Alabama (CFP National Championship)
5	Deshaun Watson	473	2015	Syracuse
6	Deshaun Watson	463	2016	Alabama (CFP National Championship)
7	Trevor Lawrence	458	2020	Georgia Tech

=== Touchdowns responsible for ===
"Touchdowns responsible for" is the NCAA's official term for combined passing and rushing touchdowns.

Career
Rank	Player	TDs	Years
1	Tajh Boyd	133	2010 2011 2012 2013
2	Deshaun Watson	116	2014 2015 2016
3	Trevor Lawrence	108	2018 2019 2020
4	Cade Klubnik	90	2022 2023 2024 2025
5	Travis Etienne	78	2017 2018 2019 2020
6	Woodrow Dantzler	68	1998 1999 2000 2001
7	Charlie Whitehurst	59	2002 2003 2004 2005
8	DJ Uiagalelei	51	2020 2021 2022
9	James Davis	47	2005 2006 2007 2008
	Cullen Harper	47	2005 2006 2007 2008

Single season
Rank	Player	TDs	Year
1	Deshaun Watson	50	2016
2	Deshaun Watson	48	2015
3	Tajh Boyd	46	2012
4	Trevor Lawrence	45	2019
5	Tajh Boyd	44	2013
6	Cade Klubnik	43	2024
7	Tajh Boyd	38	2011
8	Trevor Lawrence	32	2020

Single game
Rank	Player	TDs	Year	Opponent
1	Tajh Boyd	8	2012	NC State
2	Cade Klubnik	7	2024	Appalachian State
3	Tajh Boyd	6	2011	North Carolina
	Tajh Boyd	6	2012	Duke
	Tajh Boyd	6	2013	Ohio State (Orange Bowl)
	Deshaun Watson	6	2014	North Carolina
	Deshaun Watson	6	2015	NC State
	Deshaun Watson	6	2016	South Carolina

== Defense ==
=== Interceptions ===
Career
Rank	Player	Ints	Years
1	Terry Kinard	17	1979 1980 1981 1982
2	Fred Knoebel	15	1950 1951 1952
	DeAndre McDaniel	15	2007 2008 2009 2010
4	Michael Hamlin	14	2005 2006 2007 2008
	Rashard Hall	14	2009 2010 2011 2012
6	Justin Miller	13	2002 2003 2004
7	Eddie Geathers	12	1977 1978 1979 1980
	Robert O'Neal	12	1989 1990 1991 1992
	Alex Ardley	12	1998 1999 2000
	Brian Mance	12	1999 2000 2001 2002

Single season
Rank	Player	Ints	Year
1	Robert O'Neal	8	1989
	Justin Miller	8	2002
	DeAndre McDaniel	8	2009
4	Fred Knoebel	7	1951
5	Dennis Smith	6	1974
	Steve Ryan	6	1977
	Terry Kinard	6	1981
	Terry Kinard	6	1982
	Johnny Rembert	6	1982
	Dexter Davis	6	1990
	Brian Dawkins	6	1995
	Robert Carswell	6	1999
	Alex Ardley	6	2000
	Ricardo Jones	6	2025

Single game
Rank	Player	Ints	Year	Opponent
1	Kit Jackson	3	1965	Wake Forest
	Leomont Evans	3	1995	NC State
	Brian Dawkins	3	1995	Duke
	Alex Ardley	3	2000	Maryland
	Michael Hamlin	3	2008	The Citadel

=== Tackles ===
Career
Rank	Player	Tackles	Years
1	Bubba Brown	515	1976 1977 1978 1979
2	Anthony Simmons	486	1995 1996 1997
3	Jeff Davis	469	1978 1979 1980 1981
4	Chad Carson	448	1998 1999 2000 2001
5	John Leake	443	2000 2001 2002 2003
6	Ed McDaniel	389	1988 1989 1990 1991
7	Nick Watkins	386	2004 2005 2006 2007
8	Randy Scott	382	1975 1976 1977 1978
9	Keith Adams	379	1998 1999 2000
10	Robert Carswell	374	1997 1998 1999 2000

Single season
Rank	Player	Tackles	Year
1	Keith Adams	186	1999
2	Anthony Simmons	178	1996
3	Jeff Davis	175	1981
4	Bubba Brown	170	1978
5	John Leake	169	2002
6	Rodney Thomas	167	2002
7	Jeff Davis	160	1980
8	Anthony Simmons	158	1997
9	Chad Carson	156	2000
10	Henry Walls	153	1985

Single game
Rank	Player	Tackles	Year	Opponent
1	Keith Adams	27	1999	South Carolina

=== Sacks ===
Career
Rank	Player	Sacks	Years
1	Vic Beasley	33.0	2011 2012 2013 2014
2	Michael Dean Perry	28.0	1984 1985 1986 1987
	Gaines Adams	28.0	2003 2004 2005 2006
4	William Perry	27.0	1981 1982 1983 1984
	Clelin Ferrell	27.0	2015 2016 2017 2018
6	Adrian Dingle	23.0	1995 1996 1997 1998
	Keith Adams	23.0	1998 1999 2000
8	Brentson Buckner	22.0	1990 1991 1992 1993
	Bryant McNeal	22.0	1999 2000 2001 2002
10	T.J. Parker	21.5	2023 2024 2025

Single season
Rank	Player	Sacks	Year
1	Keith Adams	16.0	1999
2	Da'Quan Bowers	15.5	2010
3	Vic Beasley	13.0	2013
4	Gaines Adams	12.5	2006
	Shaq Lawson	12.5	2015
6	Vic Beasley	12.0	2014
	Kevin Dodd	12.0	2015
8	Clelin Ferrell	11.5	2018
9	T.J. Parker	11.0	2024
10	Adrian Dingle	10.5	1998
	Andre Branch	10.5	2011
	Carlos Watkins	10.5	2016

Single game
Rank	Player	Sacks	Year	Opponent
1	Keith Adams	5.0	1999	Duke
2	Andre Branch	4.0	2011	Virginia Tech
	Austin Bryant	4.0	2017	Auburn
	T.J. Parker	4.0	2024	Pittsburgh

== Kicking ==
=== Field goals made ===
Career
Rank	Player	FGs	Years
1	B.T. Potter	73	2018 2019 2020 2021 2022
2	Nelson Welch	72	1991 1992 1993 1994
3	Chandler Catanzaro	67	2010 2011 2012 2013
4	Obed Ariri	63	1977 1978 1979 1980
	Chris Gardocki	63	1988 1989 1990
6	Aaron Hunt	55	2000 2001 2002 2003
7	Greg Huegel	54	2015 2016 2017 2018
8	Jad Dean	51	2003 2004 2005 2006
9	David Treadwell	47	1985 1986 1987
10	Mark Buchholz	37	2007 2008

Single season
Rank	Player	FGs	Year
1	Greg Huegel	27	2015
2	Jad Dean	24	2005
3	Obed Ariri	23	1980
4	Chris Gardocki	22	1989
	Chris Gardocki	22	1990
	Nelson Welch	22	1992
	Mark Buchholz	22	2007
	Chandler Catanzaro	22	2011
9	Ammon Lakip	21	2014
	B.T. Potter	21	2021

Single game
Rank	Player	FGs	Year	Opponent
1	Jad Dean	6	2005	Texas A&M
	Richard Jackson	6	2009	Boston College
3	Nelson Welch	5	1991	NC State
	Nelson Welch	5	1992	Maryland
	Nelson Welch	5	1994	North Carolina
	Chandler Catanzaro	5	2011	Boston College
	Nolan Hauser	5	2024	Florida State
	Nolan Hauser	5	2026	Georgia Southern
	Nolan Hauser	5	2026	Florida State

=== Field goal percentage ===
Career
Rank	Player	FG%	Years
1	Bob Paulling	82.9%	1979 1981 1982 1983
2	Chandler Catanzaro	81.7%	2010 2011 2012 2013
3	Nolan Hauser	77.8%	2024 2025
4	Greg Huegel	76.1%	2015 2016 2017 2018
5	B.T. Potter	75.3%	2018 2019 2020 2021 2022

Single season
Rank	Player	FG%	Year
1	Chandler Catanzaro	94.7%	2012

== Scoring ==
Clemson does not list single-game scoring leaders in its football media guide. Its officially recognized single-game scoring record is 33 points, set by Maxcey Welch in a 1930 game against Newberry. This is one of the very few "old-time" records that the program acknowledges.

=== Points ===
Career
Rank	Player	Points	Years
1	Travis Etienne	468	2017 2018 2019 2020
2	B.T. Potter	451	2018 2019 2020 2021 2022
3	Chandler Catanzaro	404	2010 2011 2012 2013
4	Greg Huegel	380	2015 2016 2017 2018
5	Aaron Hunt	329	2000 2001 2002 2003
6	C. J. Spiller	308	2006 2007 2008 2009
7	Nelson Welch	301	1991 1992 1993 1994
8	Travis Zachery	300	1998 1999 2000 2001
9	James Davis	294	2005 2006 2007 2008
10	Obed Ariri	288	1977 1978 1979 1980

Single season
Rank	Player	Points	Year
1	Travis Etienne	156	2018
2	Travis Etienne	138	2019
	Greg Huegel	138	2015
4	C. J. Spiller	128	2009
5	Chandler Catanzaro	118	2011
	B.T. Potter	118	2019
7	B.T. Potter	115	2020
8	Mark Buchholz	114	2007
9	Greg Huegel	113	2016
	Nolan Hauser	113	2024

=== Touchdowns ===
Unlike the "Total touchdowns" lists in the "Total offense" section, these lists count touchdowns scored. Accordingly, these lists include rushing, receiving, and return touchdowns, but not passing touchdowns.

As in the case of the single-game scoring record, Clemson does not publish an all-time list of top performances for single-game touchdowns. As in the case of single-game points, the school's officially recognized record in this category comes from the "pre-modern" era. The aforementioned Maxcey Welch scored 5 touchdowns (all rushing) as part of his record 33-point performance against Newberry in 1930; this equaled Stumpy Banks' performance of 5 rushing touchdowns in a 1917 game against Furman.

Career
Rank	Player	TDs	Years
1	Travis Etienne	78	2017 2018 2019 2020
2	C. J. Spiller	51	2006 2007 2008 2009
3	Travis Zachery	50	1998 1999 2000 2001
4	James Davis	49	2005 2006 2007 2008
5	Andre Ellington	36	2009 2010 2011 2012
	Wayne Gallman	36	2014 2015 2016
7	Will Shipley	33	2021 2022 2023
8	Lester Brown	32	1976 1977 1978 1979
9	Fred Cone	31	1948 1949 1950
10	Sammy Watkins	29	2011 2012 2013

Single season
Rank	Player	TDs	Year
1	Travis Etienne	26	2018
2	Travis Etienne	23	2019
3	C. J. Spiller	21	2009
4	Travis Zachery	18	2000
	DeAndre Hopkins	18	2012
6	Lester Brown	17	1978
	James Davis	17	2006
	Wayne Gallman	17	2016
9	Travis Zachery	16	1999
	Travis Etienne	16	2020
