= 2009 Senior Bowl =

2009 Under Armour Senior Bowl
- 60th Senior Bowl
North Team	South Team
18	35
Head coach: Marvin Lewis (Cincinnati Bengals)	Head coach: Jack Del Rio (Jacksonville Jaguars)
	1	2	3	4	Total
North	0	10	0	8	18
South	7	14	7	7	35
- Date: January 24, 2009
- Season: 2008
- Stadium: Ladd–Peebles Stadium
- Location: Mobile, Alabama
- MVP: Pat White

United States TV coverage
- Network: NFL Network

The 2009 Senior Bowl was an all-star college football exhibition game featuring players from the 2008 college football season, and prospects for the 2009 draft of the professional National Football League (NFL). It was the 60th edition of the Senior Bowl.

The game was played on January 24, 2009, at 6 p.m. local time at Ladd–Peebles Stadium in Mobile, Alabama. The South defeated the North, 35–18, and quarterback Pat White of the South team was named game's Most Valuable Player (MVP). Various players were seen to have either improved or harmed their NFL draft prospects through their play in the game and the week leading up to the competition, which was closely monitored by NFL scouts and the media.

Coverage of the event was in high-definition on the NFL Network. Clothing company Under Armour sponsored the event for the third consecutive year and provided apparel for the game.

== Rosters ==
=== North Team ===
Number	Player	Position	School
1	Darius Butler	DB	Connecticut
2	Derrick Williams	WR	Penn State
4	Brandon Gibson	WR	Washington State
4	Macho Harris	DB	Virginia Tech
6	Graham Harrell	QB	Texas Tech
6	DeAngelo Smith	DB	Cincinnati
7	Rhett Bomar	QB	Sam Houston State
9	Juaquin Iglesias	WR	Oklahoma
10	Nathan Brown	QB	Central Arkansas
11	Ramses Barden	WR	Cal Poly
11	William Moore	DB	Missouri
15	Patrick Chung	DB	Oregon
16	Keenan Lewis	DB	Oregon State
22	Manuel Johnson	WR	Oklahoma
23	Kory Sheets	RB	Purdue
24	Jeremiah Johnson	RB	Oregon
25	Louis Delmas	DB	Western Michigan
27	David Bruton	DB	Notre Dame
29	Morgan Trent	DB	Michigan
35	Louie Sakoda	K	Utah
36	Eric Kettani	RB	Navy
37	Cedric Peerman	RB	Virginia
40	Scott McKillop	LB	Pittsburgh
43	Tony Fiammetta	RB	Syracuse
47	Kevin Huber	P	Cincinnati
50	Clint Sintim	LB	Virginia

Number	Player	Position	School
51	Larry English	DL	Northern Illinois
51	Alex Mack	OL	California
52	Cody Brown	DL	Connecticut
54	Tyrone McKenzie	LB	South Florida
55	Marcus Freeman	LB	Ohio State
56	Zack Follett	LB	California
57	Mark Estermyer	DS	Pittsburgh
60	Max Unger	OL	Oregon
63	Kraig Urbik	OL	Wisconsin
64	William Beatty	OL	Connecticut
66	Andy Levitre	OL	Oregon State
68	Xavier Fulton	OL	Illinois
72	Ryan Shuman	OL	Virginia Tech
76	Trevor Canfield	OL	Cincinnati
79	Phil Loadholt	OL	Oklahoma
80	Brian Robiskie	WR	Ohio State
81	Will Davis	DL	Illinois
82	Connor Barwin	TE	Cincinnati
85	John Phillips	TE	Virginia
87	Brandon Pettigrew	TE	Oklahoma State
90	B. J. Raji	DL	Boston College
91	Tim Jamison	DL	Michigan
92	Ron Brace	DL	Boston College
94	Evander Hood	DL	Missouri
95	Alex Magee	DL	Purdue
97	Mitch King	DL	Iowa

=== South Team ===
Number	Player	Position	School
1	Coye Francies	DB	San Jose State
2	Alphonso Smith	DB	Wake Forest
2	Mike Thomas	WR	Arizona
3	Derek Pegues	DB	Mississippi St.
4	Ellis Lankster	DB	West Virginia
5	Pat White	QB	West Virginia
6	Quan Cosby	WR	Texas
6	Sherrod Martin	DB	Troy
7	Patrick Turner	WR	USC
9	Chip Vaughn	DB	Wake Forest
9	Mike Wallace	WR	Ole Miss
10	Brian Cushing	LB	USC
10	Cullen Harper	QB	Clemson
11	Ashlee Palmer	LB	Ole Miss
14	John Parker Wilson	QB	Alabama
15	Thomas Morstead	P	SMU
16	Domonique Johnson	DB	Jackson State
18	Greg Carr	WR	Florida State
21	Antone Smith	RB	Florida State
22	James Davis	RB	Clemson
23	Rashad Jennings	RB	Liberty
24	Andre Brown	RB	NC State
25	Michael Hamlin	DB	Clemson
40	Pat McAfee	K	West Virginia
45	Quinn Johnson	RB	LSU

Number	Player	Position	School
47	Clay Matthews	LB	USC
48	Darry Beckwith	LB	LSU
49	Rashad Johnson	DB	Alabama
57	Jake Ingram	DS	Hawaii
58	Rey Maualuga	LB	USC
59	Antoine Caldwell	OL	Alabama
59	Moise Fokou	LB	Maryland
60	Eric Wood	OL	Louisville
63	Jonathan Luigs	OL	Arkansas
71	Tyronne Green	OL	Auburn
74	Michael Oher	OL	Ole Miss
75	Fili Moala	DL	USC
76	Troy Kropog	OL	Tulane
77	Jason Watkins	OL	Florida
79	Herman Johnson	OL	LSU
81	Shawn Nelson	TE	Southern Miss
83	Travis McCall	TE	Alabama
84	Kyle Moore	DL	USC
85	Anthony Hill	TE	NC State
90	Corvey Irvin	DL	Georgia
91	Robert Ayers	DL	Tennessee
92	David Veikune	DL	Hawaii
95	Lawrence Sidbury	DL	Richmond
98	Peria Jerry	DL	Ole Miss
99	Vance Walker	DL	Georgia Tech
