= Buddy Gore =

Profile
- Position: Running back

Personal information
- Born: c. 1948; Conway, South Carolina, U.S.

Career information
- College: Clemson (1966–1968)

Aubrey "Buddy" Gore (born c. 1948) is a former American football running back. He played college football for Clemson from 1966 to 1968. As a sophomore in 1967, he led the ACC in rushing with 750 yards. As a junior in 1967, he set the ACC single-season rushing record, was selected as the ACC Player of the Year, became Clemson's first 1,000-yard rusher, and ranked eighth nationally among major-college players with 1,045 rushing yards. He was also selected as the ACC Player of the Year in 1967. In three years at Clemson, he tallied 2,571 rushing yards and scored 16 touchdowns. In 1999, when Clemson selected its greatest players of the 20th century, Gore was ranked No. 22. He was inducted into the South Carolina Athletic Hall of Fame in 2000.

== See also ==
- Clemson Tigers football statistical leaders#Rushing
