= Anthony Henry (American football) =

American football player (born 1976)

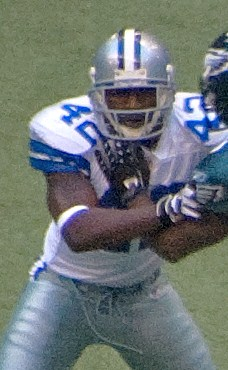
- Henry with the Dallas Cowboys in 2007

No. 37, 42, 32
- Position: Cornerback

Personal information
- Born: November 3, 1976 (age 50); Fort Myers, Florida, U.S.
- Listed height: 6 ft 1 in (1.85 m)
- Listed weight: 207 lb (94 kg)

Career information
- High school: Estero (Estero, Florida)
- College: South Florida
- NFL draft: 2001: 4th round, 97th overall pick

Career history
- Cleveland Browns (2001–2004); Dallas Cowboys (2005–2008); Detroit Lions (2009)

Awards and highlights
- NFL interceptions co-leader (2001); PFWA All-Rookie Team (2001); Second-team All-Independent (1997)

Career NFL statistics
- Total tackles: 512
- Sacks: 2
- Forced fumbles: 5
- Fumble recoveries: 2
- Interceptions: 31
- Defensive touchdowns: 3
- Stats at Pro Football Reference

Anthony Danel Henry (born November 3, 1976) is an American former professional football player who was a cornerback in the National Football League (NFL). He was selected by the Cleveland Browns in the fourth round of the 2001 NFL draft and also played for the Dallas Cowboys and Detroit Lions. He played college football for the South Florida Bulls.

== Early life ==
Henry attended Estero High School in Estero, Florida. He was named the district MVP in track, after setting school records in the triple jump (44”1’) and high jump (6'6"). In football, he was named Lee County Athlete of the Year and district player of the year. He also lettered in basketball.

== College career ==
Henry accepted a scholarship from the University of South Florida. He didn't play in his first year because of failing to meet the requirements of Proposition 48, but his work in the classroom eventually allowed the NCAA to grant him an additional year of eligibility in 2000.

As freshman he received second-team All-Independent honors at free safety after registering 73 tackles, 2 interceptions and 2 fumble recoveries. The next year, he ranked third on the team with 79 tackles and played quarterback for one series against Valparaiso University. As a junior, he started eight-of-nine games at free safety and registered 62 tackles (fourth on the team), 3 interceptions and 2 fumble recoveries. In his last year he was moved to cornerback, but also saw snaps at free safety and wide receiver, while finishing with 40 tackles, 5 interceptions (led the team), 8 passes defensed (led the team).

He was in the first batch of 4-year letter winners ever in the USF's football program. He ended his collegiate career with 256 tackles (9 for loss), 6 fumble recoveries, 22 passes defensed and led the team in interceptions two years in a row (1999, 2000).

Henry is a member of the University of South Florida Athletic Hall of Fame and was the Bulls first football player to be inducted into the Hall.

== Professional career ==
Pre-draft measurables
Height	Weight	Arm length	Hand span	40-yard dash	10-yard split	20-yard split	20-yard shuttle	Three-cone drill	Vertical jump	Broad jump	Bench press
6 ft 0 3/4 in (1.85 m)	198 lb (90 kg)	32 1/2 in (0.83 m)	9 in (0.23 m)	4.52 s	1.57 s	2.61 s	4.20 s	6.90 s	41.0 in (1.04 m)	10 ft 6 in (3.20 m)	15 reps
All values from NFL Combine

=== Cleveland Browns ===
Henry was selected by the Cleveland Browns in the fourth round of the 2001 NFL draft. As a rookie, he played in 16 games (2 starts) and tied for the NFL lead in interceptions with 10. Also set a franchise record with a 97-yard interception return for a touchdown.

He saw less action his second year. In 2003, he was named the starter at right cornerback. In 2004, he tallied 76 tackles, 4 interceptions and 12 passes defensed.

During his four years with the team from 2001 to 2004, he started 39 of 61 games, recording 247 tackles, 17 interceptions, 49 passes defensed and a touchdown.

=== Dallas Cowboys ===
Henry signed a five-year, $25 million deal with the Dallas Cowboys as an unrestricted free agent in 2005. With a $10 million signing bonus, a $1 million roster bonus in 2005 and a $1 million roster bonus in 2006. He got paid $18 million over the first three years of his contract. He missed four games with a severe groin injury, that also limited him during the last 8 games of the year.

In 2006, he was limited with a knee injury but still recorded 90 tackles (third on the team), 23 passes defensed (led the team) and 2 interceptions. In 2007, he was limited with a high ankle sprain and still managed to lead the team with six interceptions (tied for fifth in the NFL). In 2008, he played 16 games (15 starts), registering 55 tackles (35 solo), 7 passes defensed, one interception and 2 sacks.

On February 28, 2009, he was traded to the Detroit Lions in exchange for quarterback Jon Kitna. He played four seasons for the Cowboys from 2005 to 2008, starting 51 of 56 games, recording 215 tackles, 12 interceptions, two sacks, and two touchdowns.

=== Detroit Lions ===
Henry was benched in week 5 of the 2009 season because of his play and replaced with Phillip Buchanon. He was not re-signed at the end of the year.

== NFL career statistics ==
Legend
	Led the league
**Bold**	Career high

=== Regular season ===
Year	Team	Games		Tackles					Interceptions					Fumbles			
Year	Team	GP	GS	Cmb	Solo	Ast	Sck	TFL	Int	Yds	TD	Lng	PD	FF	FR	Yds	TD
2001	CLE	**16**	2	54	44	10	0.0	1	**10**	**177**	**1**	**97**	17	0	0	0	0
2002	CLE	**16**	10	66	60	6	0.0	**2**	2	4	0	4	11	**3**	0	0	0
2003	CLE	14	13	54	39	**15**	0.0	0	1	19	0	19	9	0	0	0	0
2004	CLE	15	14	76	67	9	0.0	1	4	83	0	51	12	0	0	0	0
2005	DAL	12	10	49	40	9	0.0	0	3	102	**1**	58	14	1	0	0	0
2006	DAL	**16**	**16**	**81**	**73**	8	0.0	0	2	41	0	37	**21**	0	0	0	0
2007	DAL	13	10	36	29	7	0.0	0	6	81	**1**	28	13	0	0	0	0
2008	DAL	**16**	15	50	39	11	**2.0**	**2**	1	0	0	0	5	1	**2**	0	0
2009	DET	14	6	46	38	8	0.0	0	2	26	0	26	7	0	0	0	0
		132	96	512	429	83	2.0	6	31	533	3	97	109	5	2	0	0

=== Playoffs ===
Year	Team	Games		Tackles					Interceptions					Fumbles			
Year	Team	GP	GS	Cmb	Solo	Ast	Sck	TFL	Int	Yds	TD	Lng	PD	FF	FR	Yds	TD
2002	CLE	**1**	0	3	3	0	0.0	0	0	0	0	0	1	0	0	0	0
2006	DAL	**1**	**1**	1	1	0	0.0	0	**1**	-4	0	-4	**2**	0	0	0	0
2007	DAL	**1**	**1**	**5**	**5**	0	0.0	0	0	0	0	0	0	0	0	0	0
		3	2	9	9	0	0.0	0	1	-4	0	-4	3	0	0	0	0

== Personal life ==
Venturing out to Los Angeles to pursue a career in entertainment, Henry co-stars in the film Once Upon a Time in Brooklyn starring William DeMeo & Ice-T. Henry also launched his online music magazine Coool Flame (www.CooolFlame.com) in February 2013, which focused on urban music. He is also an investor with First Picks Management (owned by former NFL Player Keyshawn Johnson), owning several Panera Breads across the Southern California region.
