= Derrick Morse =

American football player (born 1985)

Profile
- Position: Offensive lineman / defensive lineman

Personal information
- Born: February 22, 1985 (age 41); Fort Myers, Florida, U.S.
- Listed height: 6 ft 5 in (1.96 m)
- Listed weight: 290 lb (132 kg)

Career information
- High school: Estero (Estero, Florida)
- College: Miami (FL) (2003–2007)
- NFL draft: 2010: undrafted

Career history
- Jacksonville Sharks (2011)

Awards and highlights
- Second-team All-ACC (2007)
- Stats at ArenaFan.com

Derrick Morse (born February 22, 1985) is an American former football player who played for the Jacksonville Sharks. He played as a guard for the University of Miami. He was signed as an undrafted free agent by the Jacksonville Sharks in 2010.
