= Darrell Robertson =

American gridiron football player (born 1986)

No. 98
- Position: Linebacker

Personal information
- Born: April 15, 1986 (age 40); Jonesboro, Georgia, U.S.
- Listed height: 6 ft 4 in (1.93 m)
- Listed weight: 246 lb (112 kg)

Career information
- College: Georgia Tech
- NFL draft: 2008: undrafted

Career history
- Dallas Cowboys (2008)*; Edmonton Eskimos (2008); New England Patriots (2008–2009)*; Kansas City Chiefs (2009)*
- * Offseason or practice squad member only

Awards and highlights
- Second-team All-ACC (2007)

Darrell Thomas Robertson (born April 15, 1986) is an American former football linebacker. He was signed by the Dallas Cowboys as an undrafted free agent in 2008. He played college football at Georgia Tech.

Robertson was also a member of the Edmonton Eskimos, New England Patriots and Kansas City Chiefs.

== Professional career ==
=== Dallas Cowboys ===
Robertson was signed by the Dallas Cowboys as an undrafted free agent on April 29, 2008. He was waived by the team on August 30 during final cuts.

=== Edmonton Eskimos ===
Robertson was signed to the CFL's Edmonton Eskimos' practice roster on September 10, 2008. He was then signed to the active roster on September 17. He was released by the team on September 29.

=== New England Patriots ===
Robertson was signed to the practice squad of the New England Patriots on November 17, 2008 when tight end Tyson DeVree was promoted to the active roster. He was waived by the team on February 27, 2009.

=== Kansas City Chiefs ===
Robertson was signed by the Kansas City Chiefs on March 6, 2009. He was waived on June 19, 2009.
