= Estero High School =

Coordinates: 26.421389°N 81.797244°W

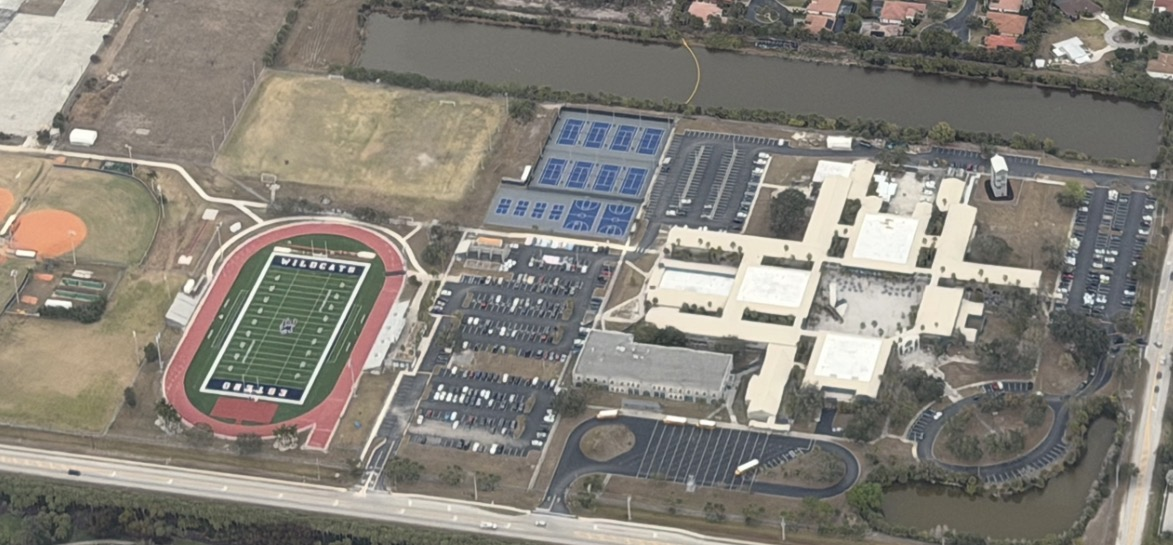

Location
- 21900 River Ranch Road; Estero, Florida 33928; United States

Information
- Type: Public Secondary
- Motto: "Where students come to learn and leave to succeed."
- Established: 1987
- School district: Lee County School District
- Principal: Jennifer Briddell
- Teaching staff: 62.00(FTE)
- Grades: 9–12
- Enrollment: 1,571 (2024–2025)
- Student to teacher ratio: 25.34
- Campus: Suburban
- Colors: Navy, white and red
- Mascot: Wildcats
- Website: est.leeschools.net

Estero High School is a public high school located in Estero, Florida, United States. It is part of the Lee County School District and opened in 1987. The total enrollment is about 1,667 students. Its mascot is the Wildcat.

Estero High School offers the Cambridge program and other programs like dual enrollment.

== Notable alumni ==
- Dominic Fike — singer, songwriter, rapper and actor
- Anthony Henry — cornerback in the NFL from 2001 to 2009
- Tom Lawlor — former wrestler, current mixed martial artist for the Ultimate Fighting Championship
- Matt Prater — placekicker in the NFL from 2007 to the present
- Derrick Morse – former professional football player
- Mere Smith — television script-writer who wrote for the series Angel, and for the HBO series Rome and Burn Notice
- Josh Winckowski — professional baseball pitcher
