= Barry Richardson (American football) =

American football player (born 1986)

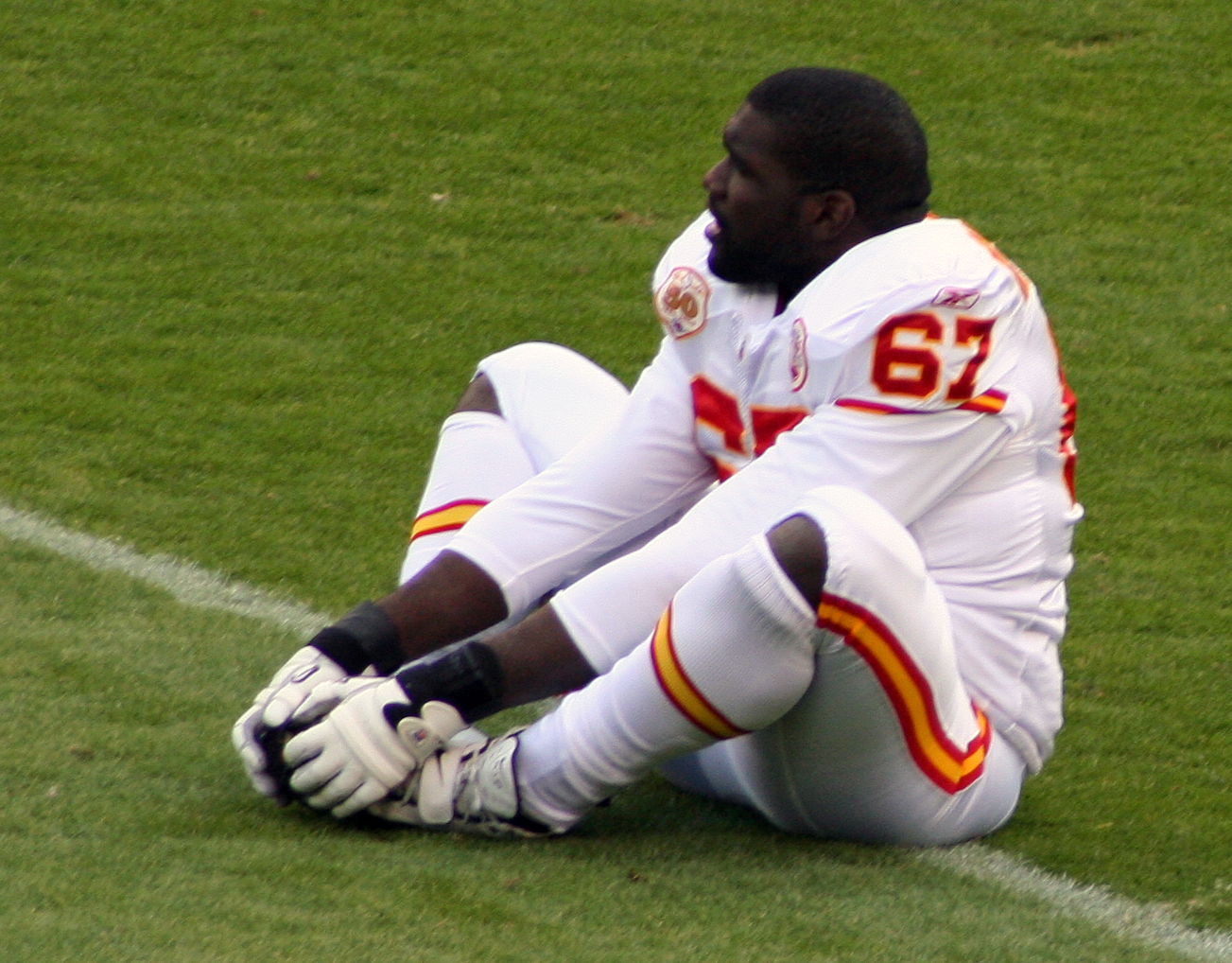
- Richardson with the Kansas City Chiefs in 2010

No. 67, 79, 73
- Position: Offensive tackle

Personal information
- Born: May 15, 1986 (age 40); Mount Pleasant, South Carolina, U.S.
- Listed height: 6 ft 7 in (2.01 m)
- Listed weight: 319 lb (145 kg)

Career information
- High school: Wando (Mt. Pleasant)
- College: Clemson
- NFL draft: 2008: 6th round, 170th overall pick

Career history
- Kansas City Chiefs (2008−2011); St. Louis Rams (2012); Tennessee Titans (2013)*; Detroit Lions (2013)
- * Offseason or practice squad member only

Awards and highlights
- Second-team All-American (2007); 2× First-team All-ACC (2006, 2007)

Career NFL statistics
- Games played: 64
- Games started: 49
- Stats at Pro Football Reference

Barry Devon Richardson (born May 15, 1986) is an American former professional football player who was an offensive tackle in the National Football League (NFL). He played college football for the Clemson Tigers before being selected by the Kansas City Chiefs in the sixth round of the 2008 NFL draft.

== Professional career ==
=== Kansas City Chiefs ===
Richardson was selected by the Kansas City Chiefs in the sixth round (170th overall) of the 2008 NFL draft. He signed a three-year contract with the team on June 25, 2008. He played in six games in 2008, with no starts. He was waived during final cuts on September 6, 2009, but was re-signed to the team's practice squad on September 7. He was promoted to the active roster on October 17, and subsequently played in ten games with one start in 2009. He was re-signed to a one-year contract on March 31, 2010. Following a groin injury to Ryan O'Callaghan, Richardson became the starting right tackle for the Chiefs. Richardson was released by the Chiefs following the 2011 NFL season

=== St. Louis Rams ===
Richardson signed with the St. Louis Rams on May 15, 2012. He started 16 games at right tackle for the Rams in 2012.

=== Tennessee Titans ===
Richardson signed with the Tennessee Titans on June 19, 2013. On August 26, 2013, he was waived by the Titans.

=== Detroit Lions ===
On October 22, 2013, Richardson signed with the Detroit Lions. He played one game for the Lions, but was cut on November 5.
