= 2007 All-Atlantic Coast Conference football team =

American college football all-star team

The 2007 All-Atlantic Coast Conference football team consists of American football players chosen by various selectors for their All-Atlantic Coast Conference ("ACC") teams for the 2007 college football season. Selectors in 2007 included the Associated Press (AP).

== Offensive selections ==
=== Wide receivers ===
- Aaron Kelly, Clemson (AP-1)
- Kenneth Moore, Wake Forest (AP-1)
- Hakeem Nicks, North Carolina (AP-2)
- Eron Riley, Duke (AP-2)

=== Tackles ===
- Barry Richardson, Clemson (AP-1)
- Andrew Gardner, Georgia Tech (AP-1)
- Duane Brown, Virginia Tech (AP-2)
- Gosder Cherilus, Boston College (AP-2)

=== Guards ===
- Brandon Albert, Virginia (AP-1)
- Chris McDuffie, Clemson (AP-1)
- Andrew Crummey, Maryland (AP-2)
- Rodney Hudson, Florida St. (AP-2)
- Derrick Morse, Miami (AP-2)

=== Centers ===
- Steve Justice, Wake Forest (AP-1)
- Kevin Tuminello, Georgia Tech (AP-2)

=== Tight ends ===
- Ryan Purvis, Boston College (AP-1)
- Tom Santi, Virginia (AP-2)

=== Quarterbacks ===
- Matt Ryan, Boston College (AP-1)
- Cullen Harper, Clemson (AP-2)

=== Running backs ===
- Tashard Choice, Georgia Tech (AP-1)
- James Davis, Clemson (AP-1)
- Andre Callender, Boston College (AP-2)
- Josh Adams, Wake Forest (AP-2)

== Defensive selections ==
=== Defensive ends ===
- Chris Long, Virginia (AP-1)
- Chris Ellis, Virginia Tech (AP-1)
- Hilee Taylor, North Carolina (AP-2)
- Darrell Robertson, Georgia Tech (AP-2)

=== Defensive tackles ===
- Vance Walker, Georgia Tech (AP-1)
- Dre Moore, Maryland (AP-1)
- Barry Booker, Virginia Tech (AP-2)
- Kentwan Balmer, North Carolina (AP-2)

=== Linebackers ===
- Erin Henderson, Maryland (AP-1)
- Xavier Adibi, Virginia Tech (AP-1)
- Geno Hayes, Florida St. (AP-1)
- Durrell Mapp, North Carolina (AP-2)
- Aaron Curry, Wake Forest (AP-2)
- Jo-Lonn Dunbar, Boston College (AP-2)
- Philip Wheeler, Georgia Tech (AP-2)

=== Cornerbacks ===
- Alphonso Smith, Wake Forest (AP-1)
- Macho Harris, Virginia Tech (AP-1)
- DeJuan Tribble, Boston College (AP-2)
- Brandon Flowers, Virginia Tech (AP-2)

=== Safeties ===
- Jamie Silva, Boston College (AP-1)
- Kenny Phillips, Miami (AP-1)
- Michael Hamlin, Clemson (AP-2)
- DaJuan Morgan, NC State (AP-2)

== Special teams ==
=== Placekickers ===
- Travis Bell, Georgia Tech (AP-1)
- Gary Cismesia, Florida St. (AP-2)

=== Punters ===
- Durant Brooks, Georgia Tech (AP-1)
- Ryan Weigand, Virginia (AP-2)

=== Return specialist ===
- Eddie Royal, Virginia Tech (AP-1)
- Darrell Blackman, NC State (AP-2)

== Key ==
AP = Associated Press

== See also ==
- 2007 College Football All-America Team
