= B. T. Potter =

American football player (born 2000)

Profile
- Position: Placekicker

Personal information
- Born: February 21, 2000 (age 26); Rock Hill, South Carolina, U.S.
- Listed height: 5 ft 10 in (1.78 m)
- Listed weight: 185 lb (84 kg)

Career information
- High school: South Pointe (Rock Hill)
- College: Clemson (2018–2022)
- NFL draft: 2023: undrafted

Career history
- Pittsburgh Steelers (2023)*; Michigan Panthers (2025); Tampa Bay Buccaneers (2026)*
- * Offseason or practice squad member only

Awards and highlights
- CFP national champion (2018); 2× Second-team All-ACC (2021, 2022)
- Stats at Pro Football Reference

Benjamin "B. T." Potter (born February 21, 2000) is an American professional football placekicker. He played college football for the Clemson Tigers.

== Early life ==
Potter grew up in Rock Hill, South Carolina and attended South Pointe High School. During his high school career he went 31 for 45 on field-goal attempts and he converted on 211 of his extra-point attempts. He was ranked the number 1 placekicker in the nation by Chris Sailer and the number 7 by ESPN. On June 7, Potter committed to play football at Clemson University.

== College career ==
In Potters first collegiate year during the 2018 season he appeared in 2 games going 7 for 7 on extra points and 1 for 1 on fields goals. In the 2019 season Potter assumed the starting kicker role playing 15 games, going a perfect 79 for 79 on extra points, and 13 for 21 on field goals. In the 2020 season he played in 12 games going 61 for 62 on extra points and 18 for 23 on field goal attempts. In his 2021 season he would go 38 for 38 on extra points and 21 for 26 on field goals. After the season he would be named second team all ACC for his performance. In the 2022 season he would play in 14 games going 49 for 49 on his extra points attempts and 20 for 26 on field goals, once again for his performance he would be named second team all ACC.

At his time at Clemson he set multiple records including, scoring in the most consecutive games in Clemson history, being 54 games, the longest made field goal in ACC Championship game history, becoming first kicker in ACC history to put have four different 100-points seasons. the most field goals made in Clemson history, the most extra points made in Clemson history, and the most points in Clemson history.

== Professional career ==
Pre-draft measurables
Height	Weight	Arm length	Hand span	Wingspan
5 ft 9 3/4 in (1.77 m)	185 lb (84 kg)	30 3/8 in (0.77 m)	8 7/8 in (0.23 m)	6 ft 2 1/4 in (1.89 m)
All values from NFL Combine

=== Pittsburgh Steelers ===
After not being selected in the 2023 NFL draft, Potter signed with the Pittsburgh Steelers as an undrafted free agent. On August 26, 2023, Potter was released by Pittsburgh.

=== Michigan Panthers ===
On November 7, 2024, Potter was signed by the Michigan Panthers of the United Football League (UFL).

=== Tampa Bay Buccaneers ===
On June 8, 2026, Potter signed with the Tampa Bay Buccaneers. He was waived by the Buccaneers on August 30.
