= DeAndre McDaniel =

American football player (born 1987)

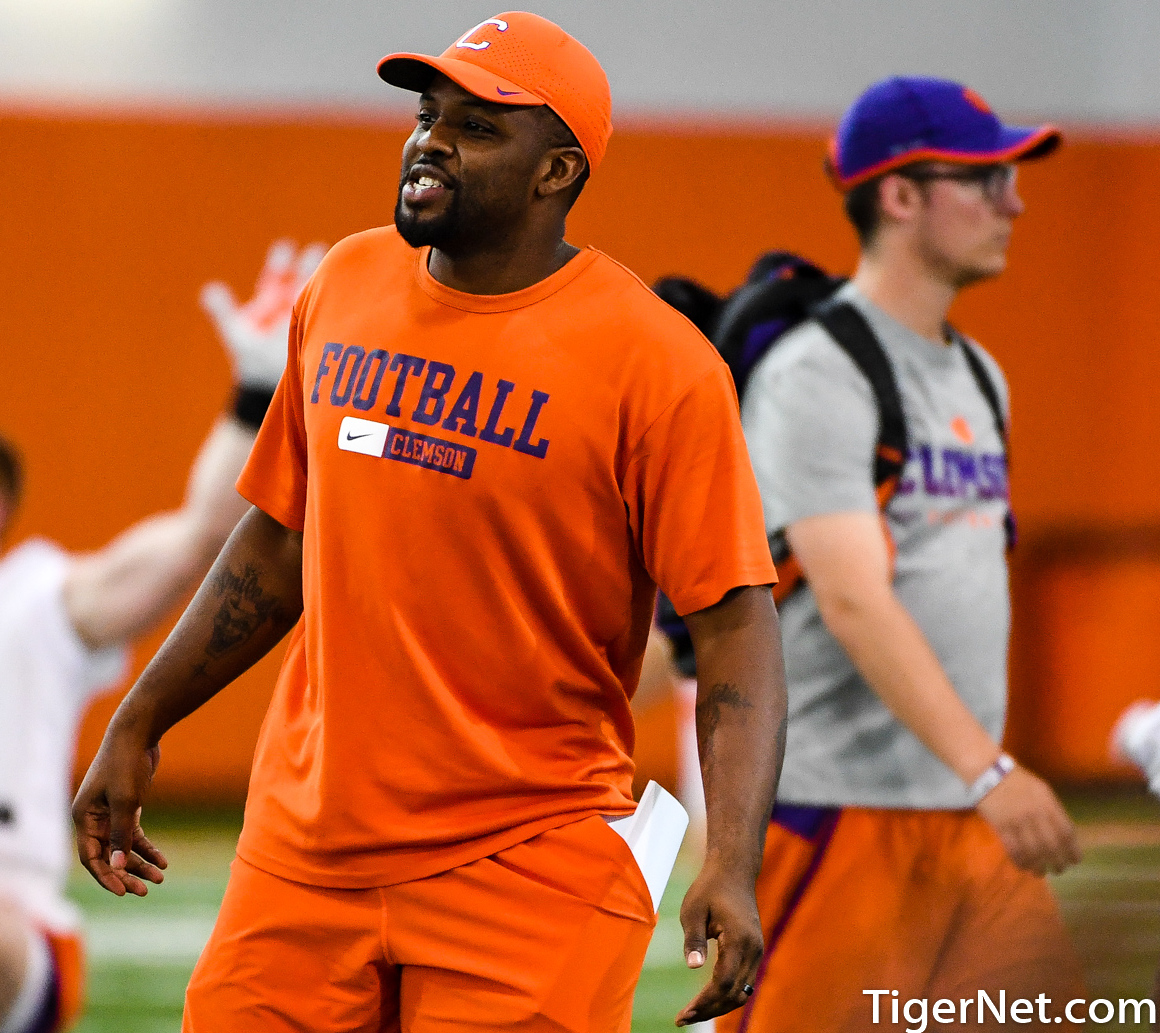
- McDaniel in 2019

No. 2
- Position: Safety

Personal information
- Born: November 26, 1987 (age 38); Tallahassee, Florida, U.S.
- Listed height: 6 ft 0 in (1.83 m)
- Listed weight: 213 lb (97 kg)

Career information
- High school: Godby (Tallahassee)
- College: Clemson
- NFL draft: 2011: undrafted

Career history
- New Orleans Saints (2011)*; Indianapolis Colts (2011)*; San Diego Chargers (2012)*
- * Offseason or practice squad member only

Awards and highlights
- First-team All-American (2009); 2× First-team All-ACC (2009, 2010); First-team All-ACC Freshman Team (2007)
- Stats at Pro Football Reference

DeAndre McDaniel (born November 26, 1987) is an American former college football player who was a safety for the Clemson Tigers. He was a first-team All-American in 2009. McDaniel was signed as an undrafted free agent by the New Orleans Saints of the National Football League (NFL) to their practice squad in 2011. He was also a member of the Indianapolis Colts' and San Diego Chargers' practice squads.

== College career ==
As a freshman in 2007, McDaniel was a first-team All-ACC freshman selection by Sporting News after recording 33 tackles and two interceptions. As a sophomore in 2008 the Tigers moved him to linebacker. He finished the season with 77 tackles and an interception.

In June 2008, McDaniel was arrested for assault and battery of a high and aggravated nature after an argument with his girlfriend. McDaniel reportedly choked his girlfriend, punched her in the head and chest, and pushed her down a flight of stairs, causing her to seek medical attention for "serious bodily injury".

In 2009, McDaniel was moved back to safety, where he recorded eight interceptions, with one returned for a touchdown. After a bowl victory over Kentucky, McDaniel decided to return to Clemson for the 2010 season. His eight interceptions tied a Clemson school record.

In 2010, McDaniel finished with 4 interceptions and 75 total tackles, including 12 in the Meineke Car Care Bowl. Despite his strong collegiate career and physical talent he was not selected in the NFL Draft.

== Professional career ==
=== New Orleans Saints ===
McDaniel went undrafted in the 2011 NFL draft. On July 25, the day the NFL lockout ended, McDaniel announced on his Twitter account that he was signed by the New Orleans Saints. He was waived on August 30.

=== Indianapolis Colts ===
McDaniel was signed to the practice squad of the Indianapolis Colts on September 7, 2011. He was released on September 12.
