= Tajh Boyd =

American football player and coach (born 1990)

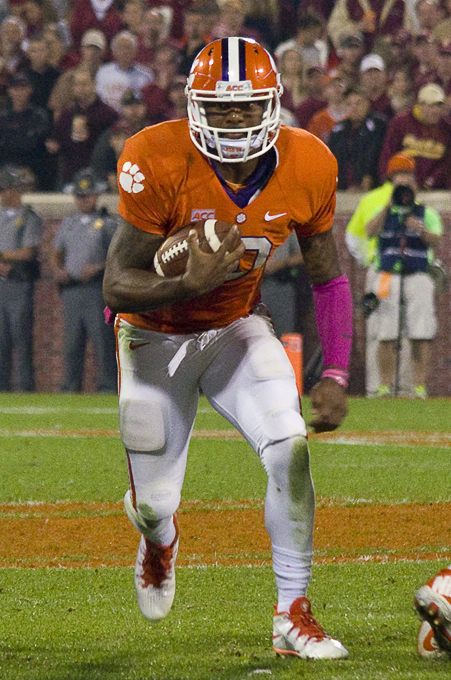
- Boyd with the Clemson Tigers in 2013

Clemson Tigers
- Title: Quarterbacks coach

Personal information
- Born: September 25, 1990 (age 36); Hampton, Virginia, U.S.
- Listed height: 6 ft 1 in (1.85 m)
- Listed weight: 222 lb (101 kg)

Career information
- Position: Quarterback (No. 21)
- High school: Phoebus (Hampton, Virginia)
- College: Clemson (2009–2013)
- NFL draft: 2014: 6th round, 213th overall pick

Career history

Playing
- New York Jets (2014)*; Florida Blacktips (2014)*; Boston Brawlers (2014); Pittsburgh Steelers (2015)*; Winnipeg Blue Bombers (2015)*; Montreal Alouettes (2015)
- * Offseason or practice squad member only

Coaching
- Clemson (2021–2023) Offensive assistant; Clemson (2024–2025) Offensive analyst / assistant quarterbacks coach; Clemson (2026–present) Quarterbacks coach

Awards and highlights
- First-team All-American (2012); ACC Player of the Year (2012); 2× First-team All-ACC (2011, 2012); Second-team All-ACC (2013)
- Stats at Pro Football Reference

Tajh Khiry Boyd (born September 25, 1990) is an American college football coach and former professional quarterback who currently is the quarterbacks coach for the Clemson Tigers. He played college football at Clemson, where he was the starting quarterback from 2011 to 2013. He earned first-team All-American honors in 2012. He was selected by the New York Jets in the sixth round of the 2014 NFL draft.

== Early life ==
Boyd attended Phoebus High School in Hampton, Virginia. As a starter on the football team, he was 43–2 winning two state championships in that tenure. He was awarded the Pete Dawkins Trophy for being the co-MVP of the 2009 U.S. Army All-American Bowl after completing 7-of-9 passes for 179 yards and three touchdowns.

== College career ==
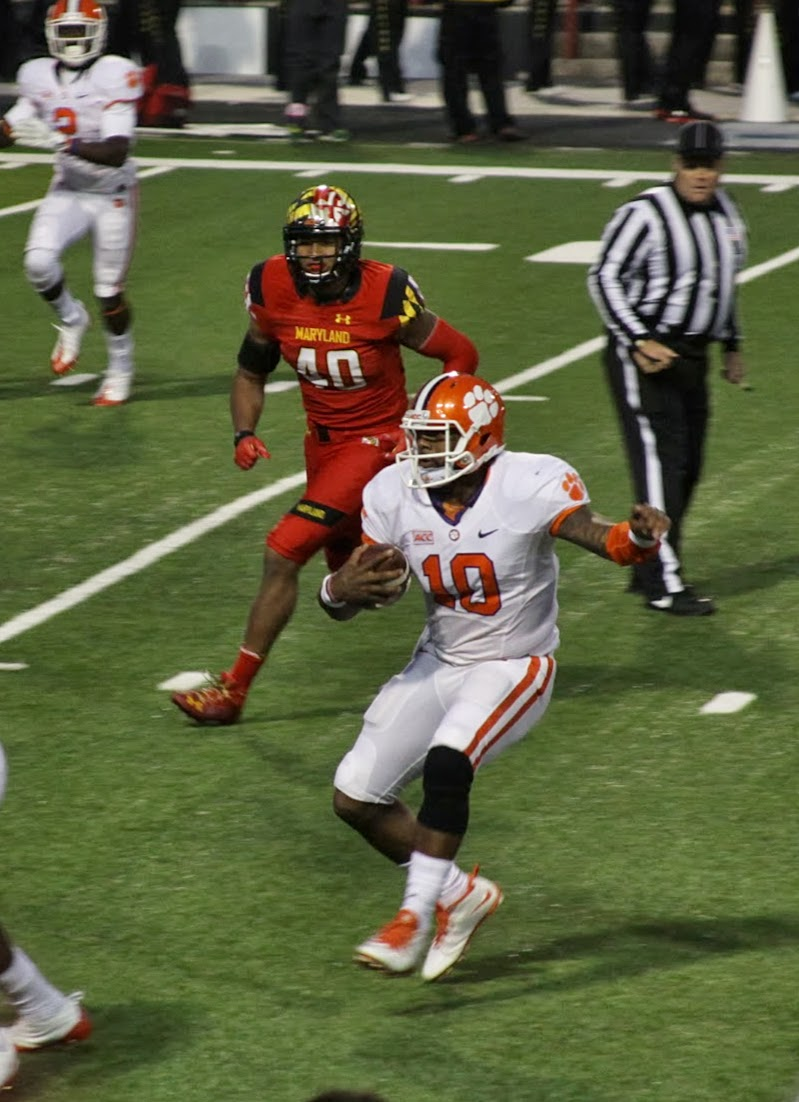
Tajh Boyd scrambles during a 2013 game against the Maryland Terrapins.

After being redshirted for the 2009 season, Boyd spent the 2010 season as the backup quarterback to Kyle Parker. He finished the season completing 33-of-63 passes for 329 yards with four touchdowns and three interceptions.

Boyd took over as the starter in the 2011 season. Boyd led the Tigers to a 10–4 record, winning the ACC Championship and setting up a game against West Virginia in the Orange Bowl. Although the Tigers lost the Orange Bowl in record fashion, 70–33, Boyd had a highly successful year. He finished the year completing 298-of-499 passes for 3,828 yards and 33 passing touchdowns. He also ran for 218 yards and five touchdowns. He was also mentioned as a possible 2012 Heisman Trophy candidate.

During his second year as a starter in the 2012 season, Boyd helped lead the Tigers to an 11–2 record, completing 287-of-427 passes for 3,896 yards, 36 touchdowns, and 13 interceptions. On November 17, 2012, in a game against NC State, he broke the ACC record for most touchdowns in a game. Boyd threw five touchdown passes and ran for three more, collecting eight total touchdowns and racking up 529 all-purpose yards. After the season, he was named the ACC Player of the Year and AFCA 1st team All-American. In the 2012 Chick-fil-A Bowl game against the LSU Tigers, Boyd completed 36 of 50 pass attempts for 346 yards and two passing touchdowns as well as a rushing touchdown and was named the game's MVP.

As a senior in 2013, the Tigers went 11–2, with Boyd completing 283-of-413 passes for 3,851 yards, 34 touchdowns, and 11 interceptions. On November 14, 2013, Boyd set the ACC career passing touchdowns record. In his final collegiate game against the Ohio State Buckeyes in the 2014 Orange Bowl, Boyd helped lead the Tigers to a 40–35 victory, completing 31-of-40 passes for 378 yards and five passing touchdowns. He also had 127 rushing yards and a touchdown. His performance set an Orange Bowl record for total yards in a game.

Boyd finished his career with school records for passing yards with 11,904 and passing touchdowns with 107. He is currently the all-time leader in both of those categories.

=== College statistics ===
| Season | Team | Passing | | | | | | | Rushing | | | |
| Season | Team | Cmp | Att | Yds | Pct | TD | Int | Rtg | Att | Yds | Avg | TD |
|---|---|---|---|---|---|---|---|---|---|---|---|---|
| 2010 | Clemson | 33 | 63 | 329 | 52.4 | 4 | 3 | 107.7 | 23 | 33 | 1.4 | 1 |
| 2011 | Clemson | 298 | 499 | 3,828 | 59.7 | 33 | 12 | 141.2 | 142 | 218 | 1.5 | 5 |
| 2012 | Clemson | 287 | 427 | 3,896 | 67.2 | 36 | 13 | 165.6 | 186 | 514 | 2.8 | 10 |
| 2013 | Clemson | 283 | 413 | 3,851 | 68.5 | 34 | 11 | 168.7 | 154 | 400 | 2.6 | 10 |
| Career | | 901 | 1,402 | 11,904 | 64.3 | 107 | 39 | 155.2 | 505 | 1,165 | 2.3 | 26 |

== Professional career ==
Pre-draft measurables
| Height | Weight | Arm length | Hand span | 40-yard dash | 10-yard split | 20-yard split | 20-yard shuttle | Three-cone drill | Vertical jump | Broad jump |
|---|---|---|---|---|---|---|---|---|---|---|
| 6 ft 0 5/8 in (1.84 m) | 222 lb (101 kg) | 30 3/4 in (0.78 m) | 9 5/8 in (0.24 m) | 4.84 s | 1.69 s | 2.82 s | 4.23 s | 7.33 s | 30.5 in (0.77 m) | 8 ft 10 in (2.69 m) |
All values from NFL Combine

Boyd was selected in the sixth round with the 213th overall pick of the 2014 NFL draft by the New York Jets. Boyd was released by the team on August 30, 2014.

Boyd signed with the Florida Blacktips of the Fall Experimental Football League (FXFL) in September 2014. However, he later ended up playing for the Boston Brawlers that season.

Boyd signed a one-year contract with the Pittsburgh Steelers on March 6, 2015, and was released by the team on August 18.

Boyd signed a contract on September 12, 2015, to join the Winnipeg Blue Bombers of the Canadian Football League. He was released by the Blue Bombers on October 16.

Boyd signed a contract on October 28, 2015, with the Montreal Alouettes of the CFL. He dressed in one game for the Alouettes during the 2015 season. He was released by the team on June 19, 2016.

== Coaching career ==
On July 19, 2021, Boyd announced in an interview that he would return to Clemson as an assistant coach working with the offense.

== Personal life ==
Boyd is a Christian. His cousin, Darrell Roseman, was an offensive lineman at Auburn.

On May 2, 2016, Boyd took a coaching position in the 100yds Football Academy. Located in Greenville, South Carolina, the academy was part of 22 ft, a basketball academy that opened in 2013. Boyd, and former Clemson Tiger running back Greg Hood, worked as a mentor and instructor in the football program. Both programs were later closed by 2018 after founder Michael Frawson pleaded guilty to fraud.

On the evening of July 14, 2016, Boyd allegedly shoved a doorman at a bar in Greenville, South Carolina, due to being told that the bar was at full capacity. On September 6, 2016, Boyd was charged with assault and battery, and turned himself in to Greenville police. On September 21, 2016, Boyd appeared in court and the judge agreed to a resolution where Boyd would pay $5,000 restitution to the doorman and complete 40 hours of community service. Subsequently, the charges were dropped.

Boyd worked in real estate before starting his coaching career.
