= John Leake (American football) =

American football player (born 1981)

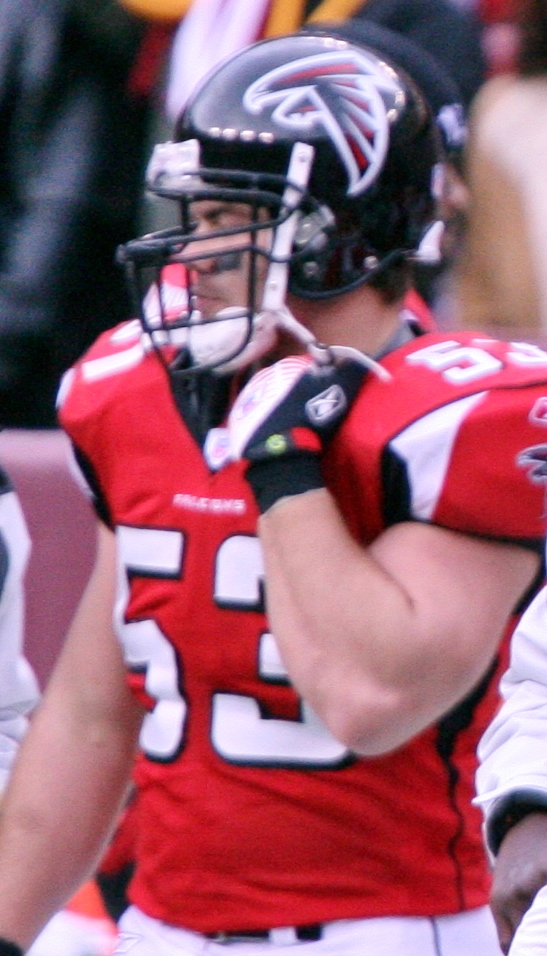
- Leake in 2006

No. 53, 57
- Position: Linebacker

Personal information
- Born: August 28, 1981 (age 45); Plano, Texas, U.S.

Career information
- High school: Plano East
- College: Clemson
- NFL draft: 2004: undrafted

Career history
- Tennessee Titans (2004)*; Atlanta Falcons (2005); Green Bay Packers (2005); Atlanta Falcons (2006)
- * Offseason or practice squad member only

Career NFL statistics
- Tackles: 12
- Stats at Pro Football Reference

John Robert Leake (born August 28, 1981) is an American former professional football player who was a linebacker in the National Football League (NFL). He played college football for the Clemson Tigers.

After his football career, he was convicted of operating a Ponzi scheme and defrauding investors of millions.

== Early life and college ==
Leake was born in Plano, Texas and graduated from Plano East Senior High School in 2000. At Clemson University, Leake played at linebacker for the Clemson Tigers football team from 2000 to 2003.

== NFL career ==
Pre-draft measurables
Height	Weight	Arm length	Hand span	40-yard dash	Three-cone drill	Vertical jump	Broad jump	Bench press
6 ft 0 in (1.83 m)	228 lb (103 kg)	30 1/4 in (0.77 m)	8 3/4 in (0.22 m)	4.75 s	7.55 s	41 1/2 in (1.05 m)	10 ft 6 in (3.20 m)	29 reps
Scouting report

Leake was not selected in the 2004 NFL draft. On April 26, 2004, Leake signed as an undrafted free agent with the Tennessee Titans. The Titans waived Leake on September 4.

Leake split the 2005 NFL season between the Atlanta Falcons and the Green Bay Packers. The following season, he was once again a member of the Falcons.
