= Aaron Kelly (Canadian football) =

American gridiron football player (born 1986)

No. 19
- Position: Wide receiver

Personal information
- Born: April 2, 1986 (age 40); Marietta, Georgia, U.S.
- Listed height: 6 ft 5 in (1.96 m)
- Listed weight: 195 lb (88 kg)

Career information
- High school: Marietta (GA) Walton
- College: Clemson
- NFL draft: 2009: undrafted

Career history
- Atlanta Falcons (2009)*; Milwaukee Iron (2010); Hamilton Tiger-Cats (2011–2013); Winnipeg Blue Bombers (2013–2014); Arizona Rattlers (2015)*; Toronto Argonauts (2015)*; Edmonton Eskimos (2015)*
- * Offseason or practice squad member only

Awards and highlights
- First-team All-ACC (2007); Second-team All-ACC (2008)

Career CFL statistics
- Receptions: 103
- Receiving yards: 1,360
- Receiving touchdowns: 6
- Total tackles: 7

Career AFL statistics
- Receptions: 3
- Receiving yards: 11
- Total tackles: 2
- Stats at ArenaFan.com

Aaron Kelly (born April 2, 1986) is an American former professional football wide receiver.

== College career ==
Aaron Kelly spent three seasons with the Clemson Tigers. In his first two seasons he was primarily utilized as a big possession receiver. In his junior year, he had over 1,000 yards and 11 touchdown receptions. In his following senior year, his yardage fell to 722 with only 4 touchdowns.

== Professional career ==
=== Atlanta Falcons ===
After going undrafted in the 2009 NFL draft Kelly was signed by the Atlanta Falcons. He was released prior to the start of the 2009 NFL season. The New Orleans Saints held a workout with Kelly midway through the season, but he was ultimately not signed.

=== Hamilton Tiger-Cats ===
Kelly signed with the Hamilton Tiger-Cats of the Canadian Football League in time for the 2011 CFL season. In his first year in the league, Kelly recorded 383 receiving yards and two touchdowns. Kelly's second season in the league was less productive, he only played in 6 of the 18 games and only recorded 107 yards and 1 touchdown. On May 23, 2013, Kelly was released by the Hamilton Tiger-Cats following the acquisition of WR Lyle Leong.

=== Winnipeg Blue Bombers ===
On August 27, 2013, Kelly signed with the Winnipeg Blue Bombers of the Canadian Football League. He was signed mid-season, Week 9, to replace a heavily injured Bombers receiving corps. In the remaining nine games of the season Kelly caught 22 passes for 321 yards, with zero touchdowns. In the first game of the 2014 CFL season, Kelly had his best single game performance of his career. It was his first time with 100 receiving yards in a game, doing so on five receptions, two of which were for touchdowns. He would go on to finish the 2014 campaign with career highs in receptions (43), yards (549) and touchdowns (3). Kelly became a free agent on February 10, 2015.

=== Toronto Argonauts ===
On the day before 2015 training camps opened, May 30, 2015, Kelly signed with the Toronto Argonauts.
