= Michael Hamlin =

American football player and coach (born 1985)

No. 36, 25
- Position: Safety

Personal information
- Born: November 21, 1985 (age 40); Lamar, South Carolina, U.S.
- Listed height: 6 ft 2 in (1.88 m)
- Listed weight: 207 lb (94 kg)

Career information
- High school: Lamar
- College: Clemson
- NFL draft: 2009: 5th round, 166th overall pick

Career history

Playing
- Dallas Cowboys (2009–2010); Jacksonville Jaguars (2010); Indianapolis Colts (2011)*; Washington Redskins (2011)*
- * Offseason or practice squad member only

Coaching
- Clemson University (2013–2014) Graduate assistant coach; Buffalo Bills (2015) Special teams quality control

Awards and highlights
- First-team All-ACC (2008); Second-team All-ACC (2007)

Career NFL statistics
- Games played: 12
- Stats at Pro Football Reference

Michael Leon Hamlin (born November 21, 1985) is an American former professional football player who was a safety in the National Football League (NFL) for the Dallas Cowboys and Jacksonville Jaguars. He played college football for the Clemson Tigers.

== Early life ==
Hamlin attended Lamar High School. He competed in football, baseball and basketball. As a sophomore, he was a two-way player at wide receiver and safety, contributing to the team reaching the 2001 state championship game.

As a senior, he recorded 4 interceptions (led the team), 20 receptions for 290 yards, 4 touchdowns, 148 punt return yards, 179 kickoff return yards and threw 3 passes for 2 touchdowns, including one to his brother in the state title game.

Hamlin finished his high school career with 23 interceptions. He received twice All-State and Region Player of the Year honors. He was also a three-time All-Region selection. He contributed to the school winning Class A state titles in 2002 and 2003.

He received All-region honors in both baseball and basketball, helping the school win the baseball state championship as a junior.

== College career ==
Hamlin accepted a football scholarship from Clemson University. As a redshirt freshman, he appeared in 12 games with 7 starts at strong safety. He registered 55 tackles (one for loss), 2 interceptions and 3 passes defensed. His first start came against North Carolina State University, making 8 tackles.

As a sophomore, he started 10 games, collecting 64 tackles (5 for loss), 2 interceptions, 3 passes defended, one forced fumble and 2 fumble recoveries. He had a 74-yard interception return in the season opener against Florida Atlantic University. He missed 3 games after breaking a bone in his left foot against Boston College. He had 10 tackles against the University of South Carolina. He had 15 tackles in the 2006 Music City Bowl against the University of Kentucky.

As a junior, he missed the first half of spring practice, recovering from surgery to repair a stress fracture that he suffered during mat drills in his right foot. He started all 13 games, registering 97 tackles (second on the team), 4 interceptions (led the team), 3 tackles for loss, 6 passes defensed, one forced fumble and 2 fumble recoveries. He intercepted a two-point conversion attempt against North Carolina State University and returned it 100 yards for the first defensive touchdown in school history off an opponent's extra point attempt. He made 14 tackles in the 2007 Chick-fil-A Bowl against #21 ranked Auburn University, before leaving the game with an injury.

As a senior, he started 13 games at the "Cat' position (strong safety). He registered 110 tackles (second on the team), 6 interceptions (led the team), 111 interception return yards (fourth in school history), 16 passes defensed (led the team), one sack, 2 quarterback pressures, 3 tackles for loss and 2 forced fumbles.

His 43 starts in 48 contests was a school record for defensive backs. He finished his college career with 326 tackles (12 for loss), 14 interceptions (third in school history), 8 takeaways (second in school history), 22 passes defensed, one sack, 4 forced fumbles and 4 fumble recoveries.

== Professional career ==
=== Dallas Cowboys ===
Hamlin was selected by the Dallas Cowboys in the fifth round (166th overall) of the 2009 NFL draft. He suffered a broken right wrist in the third preseason game while playing on special teams. He was declared inactive for the first 9 games of the season, until being activated on November 22. He appeared in 6 games, making one special teams tackle in the regular season and 3 in the playoffs.

In 2010, he appeared in the first 2 games before being waived on October 12, after the team decided to give more playing time to rookies Akwasi Owusu-Ansah and Danny McCray.

=== Jacksonville Jaguars ===
On October 15, 2010, he was signed to the Jacksonville Jaguars practice squad. He was promoted to the active roster on December 7 and played in the last 4 games. He had 3 defensive tackles and one pass defensed. He was released on August 25, 2011.

=== Indianapolis Colts ===
On August 29, 2011, he was signed by the Indianapolis Colts. He was released on September 3.

=== Washington Redskins ===
On December 20, 2011, the Washington Redskins signed him to their practice squad. He was waived on September 1, 2012.

== Coaching career ==
In 2013, Hamlin was hired as a graduate assistant at his alma mater Clemson University, where he worked with the defensive backs. In 2015, he took a job coaching in the NFL as a special teams quality control coach with the Buffalo Bills. The Bills did not retain Hamlin for the 2016 season. In 2017, he was hired as a defensive backs coach at Wilson High School.

== Personal life ==
His brothers Markee and Marquais, played safety for South Carolina State University. His cousin Amari DuBose, played running back for the U.S. Naval Academy.
