= James Davis (running back) =

American football player (born 1986)

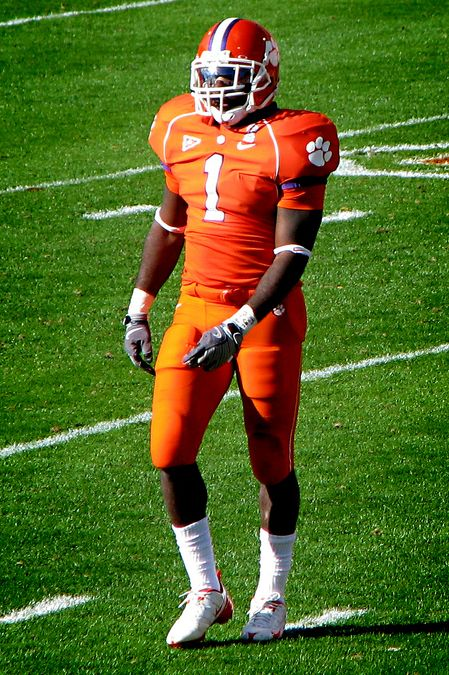
- Davis with the Clemson Tigers in 2008

No. 28, 24
- Position: Running back

Personal information
- Born: January 1, 1986 (age 40); Atlanta, Georgia, U.S.
- Listed height: 5 ft 11 in (1.80 m)
- Listed weight: 218 lb (99 kg)

Career information
- High school: Douglass (Atlanta)
- College: Clemson
- NFL draft: 2009: 6th round, 195th overall pick

Career history
- Cleveland Browns (2009–2010); Washington Redskins (2010); Houston Texans (2011)*; Detroit Lions (2011)*
- * Offseason or practice squad member only

Awards and highlights
- 2× First-team All-ACC (2006, 2007); ACC Rookie of the Year (2005)

Career NFL statistics
- Rushing attempts: 28
- Rushing yards: 75
- Rushing touchdowns: 1
- Receptions: 8
- Receiving yards: 50
- Stats at Pro Football Reference

James Andrew Davis (born January 1, 1986) is an American former professional football player who was a running back in the National Football League (NFL). He played college football for the Clemson Tigers and was selected by the Cleveland Browns in the sixth round of the 2009 NFL draft. He was also a member of the Washington Redskins, Houston Texans, and Detroit Lions.

== Early life ==
Davis was born in Atlanta, Georgia, and attended Douglass High School, where he rushed for 7,339 yards and 80 touchdowns in his career. As a senior, he ran for 2,389 yards and 28 touchdowns on 350 carries, including two games with 300+ yards. Davis has a brother Mike Davis who played for the Gamecocks. He participated in the Georgia North/South game and earned co-MVP honors as he scored the only touchdown to lead the North to victory. Davis received 5A all-state honors by the Atlanta Constitution as a senior, after being named honorable mention 5A all-state as a junior. He was also an honorable mention All-Southern team pick by the Orlando Sentinel.

Considered a four-star recruit by Rivals.com, Davis was listed as the No. 6 running back prospect in the nation in the class of 2005. He chose Clemson over Alabama, Florida, Georgia, Kentucky, Louisiana State, Mississippi State, Tennessee, and Virginia Tech.

== College career ==
Already a starter in his true freshman season at Clemson University, Davis racked up 879 rushing yards on 165 carries and scored nine rushing touchdowns, which set the Tiger single-season freshman touchdown record. He had four 100-yard rushing games, most ever by a Tiger true freshman, and ranked first among freshmen in the Atlantic Coast Conference in rushing. Davis was subsequently named ACC Rookie of the Year, the first Tiger to win the award since Anthony Simmons in 1995. He was also a second-team freshman All-American by Rivals.com and third-team by College Football News, as well as an honorable mention freshman All-American by Sporting News.

In his sophomore year, Davis rushed 1,187 yards (sixth highest total in Clemson history) for an average of 91.3 yards per game (5.85 yards per carry), 28th-best in the nation and third-best in the ACC. His 17 touchdowns tied a Clemson single-season record also held by Lester Brown in 1978, and was fifth-most in ACC history. Davis was one of ten semifinalists for the Doak Walker Award in 2006, and also earned First-team All-ACC honors.

Clemson's leading rusher for the third-straight year (the first Tiger to do so since Raymond Priester from 1995–97), Davis ran for 1,064 yards and 10 touchdowns on 214 attempts as a junior. He ranked second in the ACC and 53rd in the nation in rushing average per game (81.8). Davis became the first Tiger running back to be named First-team All-ACC in consecutive years since Terry Allen (1987, 1988).

As a senior, Davis suffered separated shoulder in spring 2008 practices, and had arthroscopic surgery to repair. He failed to reach the 1,000-yard mark for a third consecutive year, as he only rushed for 751 yard and 11 touchdowns. However, he still led Clemson in rushing, becoming the first Tiger in history to do that. Davis finished his college career fourth in Tiger history in career all-purpose yards (4,309).

== Professional career ==
=== Pre-draft ===
Davis applied for the 2008 NFL draft in January 2008, but withdrew his name a few days before the final deadline. He was automatically eligible in the 2009 NFL draft, but his draft stock had taken a hit after his up-and-down senior season. Consistently referred to as a "one-cut, one-speed runner", Davis was projected as a late-round pick.

Pre-draft measurables
Height	Weight	Arm length	Hand span	40-yard dash	10-yard split	20-yard split	20-yard shuttle	Three-cone drill	Vertical jump	Broad jump	Bench press
5 ft 11 in (1.80 m)	218 lb (99 kg)	30 1/2 in (0.77 m)	10 in (0.25 m)	4.60 s	1.62 s	2.70 s	4.37 s	7.15 s	32.0 in (0.81 m)	9 ft 1 in (2.77 m)	17 reps
All values NFL Combine

=== Cleveland Browns ===
Davis was selected in the sixth round (195th overall) by the Cleveland Browns.

On September 12, Davis was involved in a minor one-car accident and suffered a head injury. He was briefly hospitalized and released a few hours later.

Davis was projected by many pundits to be a good under-the-radar player and a fantasy sleeper, however after appearing in the season's first three games, Davis was placed on injured reserve on October 3, after allegedly being tackled by a Cleveland Browns linebacker in practice and suffering a torn labrum. It was initially reported Davis did not have shoulder pads on while the linebacker that tackled him did. However, an investigation by the NFL concluded that the injury occurred in a "controlled environment" and no league policies were violated. On October 25, 2010, he was released by the Browns.

=== Washington Redskins ===
On October 27, 2010 Davis was signed to the Washington Redskins practice squad. During the Redskins' Week 11 victory over the Tennessee Titans, back up running back, Chad Simpson, suffered a broken foot during pregame warmups, Davis was then signed to the Redskins' roster the following day, November 22, 2010.

Davis left the squad on August 15, 2011, after reportedly being unhappy with his playing time. The following day, he was placed on reserve/left squad. He requested and was granted his release on August 21.

=== Houston Texans ===
On September 28, 2011, Davis was signed to the Houston Texans practice squad.

=== Detroit Lions ===
On October 19, 2011, Davis was signed to the Detroit Lions practice squad. On October 21, he was placed on the practice squad/injured list.

== Personal life ==
Davis's brother, Mike Davis, is a former running back for the Baltimore Ravens.
