= Lester Brown (Canadian football) =

American gridiron football player (born 1957)

Profile
- Position: Running back

Personal information
- Born: January 5, 1957 (age 69); Myrtle Beach, South Carolina, U.S.
- Listed height: 5 ft 11 in (1.80 m)
- Listed weight: 178 lb (81 kg)

Career information
- High school: Myrtle Beach (SC)
- College: Clemson
- NFL draft: 1980: 7th round, 189th overall pick

Career history
- 1980–1981: Saskatchewan Roughriders
- 1982–1983: Montreal Concordes
- 1984–1985: Toronto Argonauts
- 1985–1986: Ottawa Rough Riders
- 1986–1987: Winnipeg Blue Bombers

Awards and highlights
- 2× CFL East All-Star (1984, 1985); First-team All-ACC (1978)

Lester Brown (born January 5, 1957) is an American former football running back in the Canadian Football League (CFL) for the Saskatchewan Roughriders, Montreal Concordes, Toronto Argonauts, Ottawa Rough Riders and Winnipeg Blue Bombers. He played college football at Clemson University.

== Early life ==
Brown attended Myrtle Beach High School, where he played at running back. He accepted a football scholarship from Clemson University. As a sophomore, he was a backup behind Warren Ratchford, registering 416 rushing yards (second on the team) and 9 touchdowns (led the team).

He became a starter as a junior, helping the team finish with an 11–1 record and a #6 ranking in the nation. He tallied 1,022 rushing yards, a 5.1-yard average, 17 touchdowns (school record) and ranked fourth in the nation in scoring.

As a senior, he missed 3 games with cracked ribs and his production fell to 605 rushing yards and 6 touchdowns. He finished his career with 2,228 rushing yards, a 4.5-yard average, 245 receiving yards and a school record 32 touchdowns.

In 2007, he was inducted into the Clemson Athletic Hall of Fame.

== Professional career ==
=== Dallas Cowboys ===
Brown was selected by the Dallas Cowboys in the seventh round (189th overall) of the 1980 NFL draft, with the intention of converting him into a cornerback, because he was considered undersized to play at running back. He was released on August 4.

=== Canadian Football League ===
In 1980, he was signed as a free agent by the Saskatchewan Roughriders to play as a running back. In seven games he posted 590 rushing yards and 23 receptions for 185 yards. In 1981, he played a full season, registering 804 rushing yards rushing and 32 receptions for 211 yards.

In 1982, he was traded to the Montreal Concordes in exchange for cash. He was used as a receiver out of the backfield, setting career highs with 61 receptions for 654 yards, while rushing for 388 yards on 87 attempts. In 1983, Brown was used more as a running back with 148 rushes for 792 yards and 37 catches for 327 yards.

In June 1984, he was traded to the Toronto Argonauts in exchange for linebacker Gord Elser. He received his first Eastern All-Star selection, after rushing for 594 yards, making 53 receptions for 780 yards, 10 rushing touchdowns and 8 receiving touchdowns . He was released 3 games into the 1985 season.

In 1985, he was signed as a free agent by the Ottawa Rough Riders. Between the two team's, he recorded 537 rushing yards and 31 receptions in only 11 games, to earn his second straight Eastern All-Star selection. In 1986, after playing in 9 games and rushing for 411 yards, he was traded to the Winnipeg Blue Bombers.

Brown remained in Winnipeg for two seasons (1986–1987), but only played in nine games. He finished his career with 4,586 rushing yards, 275 receptions for 2,861 yards and 48 total touchdowns.

== Personal life ==
His son Corey was a sprinter on Clemson's men's track & field team.
