= Cullen Harper =

American football player (born 1986)

No. 10
- Position: Quarterback

Personal information
- Born: October 1, 1986 (age 40); Alpharetta, Georgia, U.S.
- Listed height: 6 ft 3 in (1.91 m)
- Listed weight: 230 lb (104 kg)

Career information
- High school: Sequoyah (Canton, Georgia)
- College: Clemson (2004–2008)
- NFL draft: 2009: undrafted

Awards and highlights
- Second-team All-ACC (2007)

Cullen Harper II (born October 1, 1986) is an American former football quarterback. He played college football at Clemson.

== Early life ==
Harper grew up in Alpharetta, Georgia and attended Sequoyah High School. He played high school football for Coach Sid Maxwell. Harper was a 4 year varsity lettermen and a two-year starter at quarterback for the Chiefs. Following a successful junior season, Harper was considered one of the state's top prospects and the #1 quarterback in the state of Georgia. He earned scholarship offers from Clemson, South Carolina, Auburn, Ole Miss, Duke, Georgia Tech and several other schools in the southeast. Harper committed to Tommy Bowden and Clemson University the summer before his senior year of high school. Despite missing several games because of a broken collar bone Harper was selected to play in the North-South Georgia All-Star Game at the conclusion of the Georgia high school football season. In addition to playing football, Harper was a standout basketball player and baseball player.

== College career ==
Harper’s career began at Clemson in 2004 where he redshirted the 2004 season while training and learning behind Charlie Whitehurst.

In 2005 and 2006, Harper saw limited action as the backup quarterback. During his time as backup quarterback he completed 15 out of 22 passes for 210 yards and two touchdowns. He rushed 6 times for 24 yards. Harper earned numerous awards throughout spring training and pushed for starting time in his sophomore season.

In 2007, Harper began his run as a two-year starter at Clemson. He broke 28 school records while passing for 3,014 yards and throwing 27 touchdowns to just 6 interceptions. He was named second-team All-ACC behind Matt Ryan. Harper was the recipient of the Banks McFadden award, which goes to the top player in the state of South Carolina.

In 2008 Harper was voted Preseason ACC Player of the Year and first-team All-ACC at the quarterback position. He threw for 2,661 yards and 13 touchdowns while leading the ACC in passing yards, touchdowns, and completion percentage.

While at Clemson, he set 28 school records and was a two-time team captain as voted by his teammates. He threw for a total of 5,762 yards with a 64% completion percentage to go along with 42 touchdowns and 20 interceptions. He also rushed for another 5 touchdowns.

In 2009 Harper played for the south team on the Under Armour Senior Bowl. The Senior Bowl is considered the premier college all star game in which 150 of the top college players are selected to play in. He was also a participant in the NFL Scouting Combine held in Indianapolis. Harper participated in training camp with the Buffalo Bills.

== Post-playing career ==
Upon conclusion of his playing career, Harper went back to obtain an MBA at Clemson and went to work as a medical sales associate at Orthovita. Realizing that he wanted to be the one helping patients, Harper attended dental school at the Medical University of South Carolina. As of 2019, he was in training to become an oral and maxillofacial surgeon at the Dental College of Georgia. In July 2020, Harper began his Oral and Maxillofacial Surgery residency at the University of Tennessee Medical Center in Knoxville, TN.

Harper and his wife, Jordan, have four children: two daughters, Charlie (born 2019), and Josey (born 2020), and twin boys Tommy and Archie born in 2022. They reside in Knoxville, TN.
