= List of Clemson Tigers in the NFL draft =

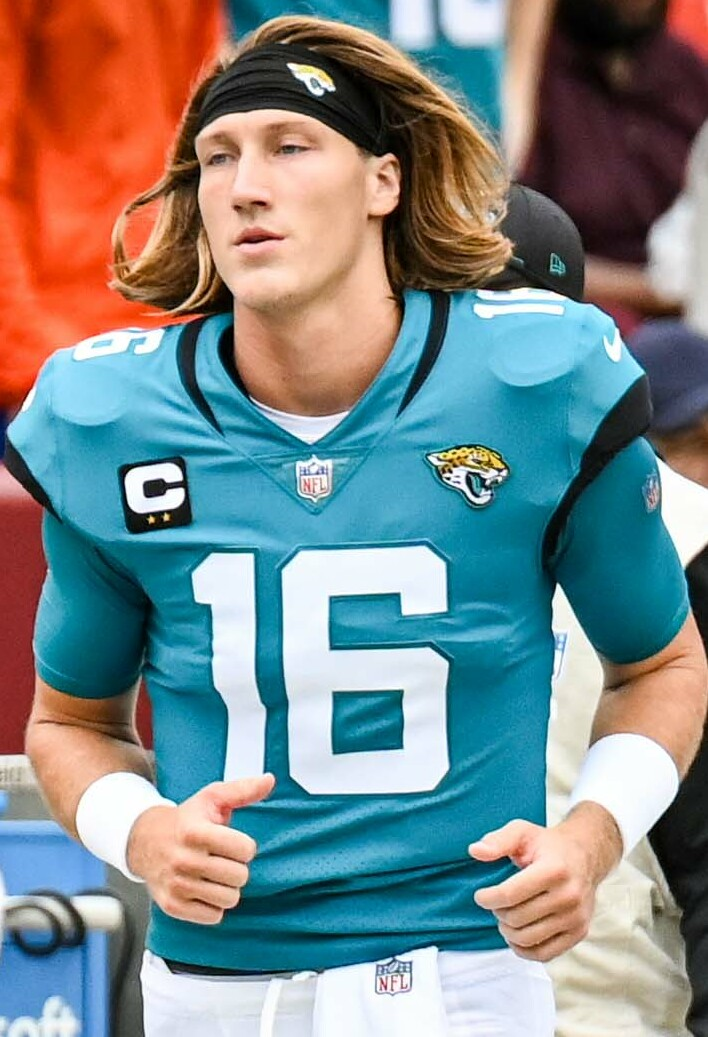
Trevor Lawrence was the first overall selection in the 2021 NFL Draft.

The Clemson Tigers football team of Clemson University has had 289 players drafted into the National Football League (NFL) since the league began holding drafts in 1936. (Note: Because of the NFL–AFL merger agreement, the history of the AFL is officially recognized by the NFL and therefore this list includes the AFL draft (1960–1966) and the Common Draft (1967–1969).) Each NFL franchise seeks to add new players through the annual NFL Draft. The draft rules were last updated in 2009. The team with the worst record the previous year picks first, the next-worst team second, and so on. Teams that did not make the playoffs are ordered by their regular-season record, with any remaining ties broken by strength of schedule. Playoff participants are sequenced after non-playoff teams, based on their round of elimination (wild card, division, conference, and Super Bowl).

Before the merger agreements in 1966, the American Football League (AFL) operated in direct competition with the NFL and held a separate draft. This led to a massive bidding war over top prospects between the two leagues, along with the subsequent drafting of the same player in each draft. As part of the merger agreement on June 8, 1966, the two leagues held a multiple round "Common Draft". Once the AFL officially merged with the NFL in 1970, the "Common Draft" simply became the NFL Draft.

The 2021 NFL draft was the only draft where a Tiger was drafted first overall with quarterback Trevor Lawrence. Forty Tigers have been drafted in the first round of the NFL Draft, with the most recent ones being Blake Miller and Peter Woods in 2026. The single first round of the NFL Draft with the most Tigers selected was 2019 with three players; while 1979, 1982, 2015, 2017, 2020, 2021, 2023, 2026 saw two players go in the first round. The most Tigers selected in a single NFL Draft is nine, in 1983, 2016, and 2026.

Of the Tigers selected in the NFL Draft, twenty-three have been selected to a Pro Bowl, and twenty-seven share a combined thirty-three Super Bowl championship rings.

The New York Giants have drafted the most Tigers with eighteen, and Pittsburgh Steelers the 2nd-most with seventeen. Clemson has had at least one player selected by 30 NFL franchises since 2003. The New England Patriots haven't drafted a Tiger since 1991, while only the Carolina Panthers have never drafted a Tiger.

== Key ==
B	Back	K	Kicker	NT	Nose tackle
C	Center	LB	Linebacker	FB	Fullback
DB	Defensive back	P	Punter	HB	Halfback
DE	Defensive end	QB	Quarterback	WR	Wide receiver
DT	Defensive tackle	RB	Running back	G	Guard
E	End	T	Offensive tackle	TE	Tight end

^{*}	Selected to an all-star game (AFL All-Star game, NFL All-Star game or Pro Bowl)
^{†}	Won a league championship (AFL championship, NFL championship, or Super Bowl)
^{‡}	Inducted into Pro Football Hall of Fame

== Players selected ==
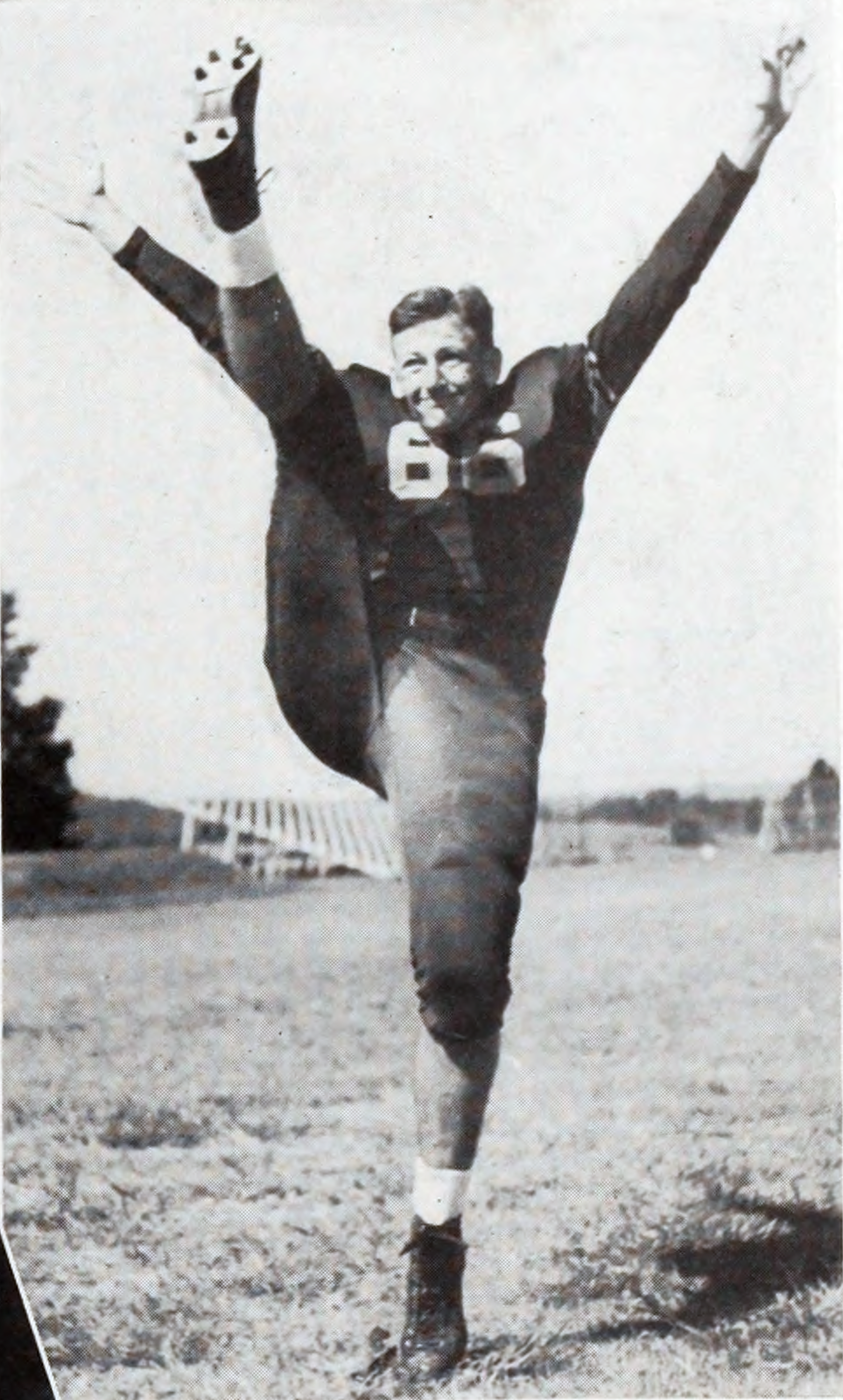
Banks McFadden was drafted 4th overall by the Brooklyn Dodgers in the 1940 NFL Draft.

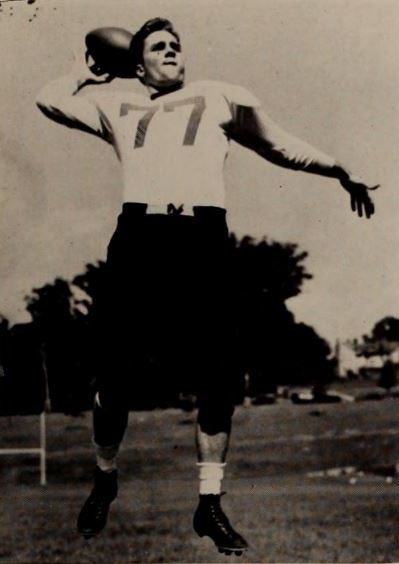
Bobby Gage was drafted 6th overall by the Pittsburgh Steelers in the 1949 NFL Draft.

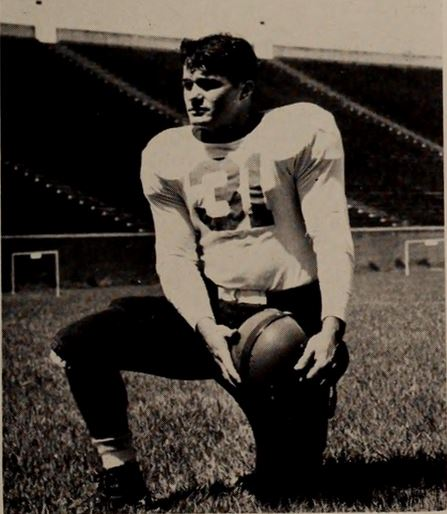
Fred Cone was drafted 27th overall by the Green Bay Packers in the 1951 NFL Draft.

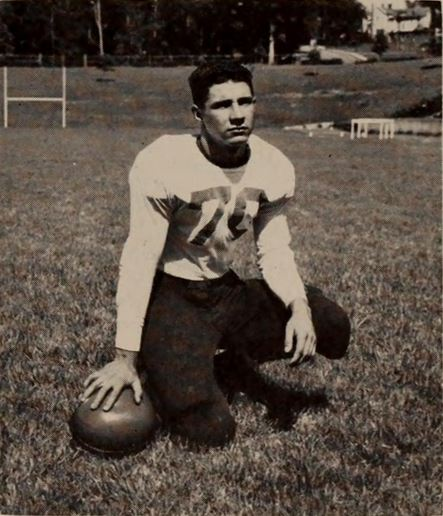
Ray Mathews was drafted 81st overall by the Pittsburgh Steelers in the 1951 NFL Draft.

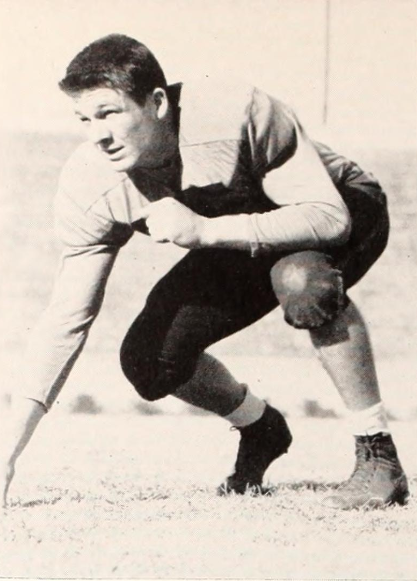
Bob Hudson was drafted 146th overall by the New York Giants in the 1951 NFL Draft.

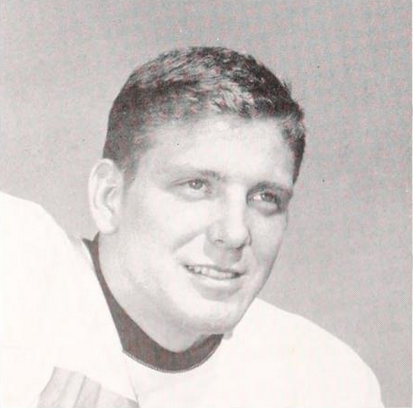
Joel Wells was drafted 18th overall by the Green Bay Packers in the 1957 NFL Draft.

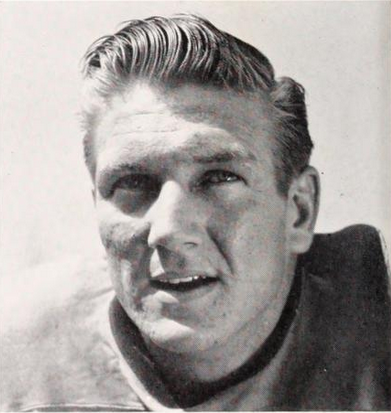
Bill Hudson was drafted 34th overall by the Chicago Cardinals in the 1957 NFL Draft.

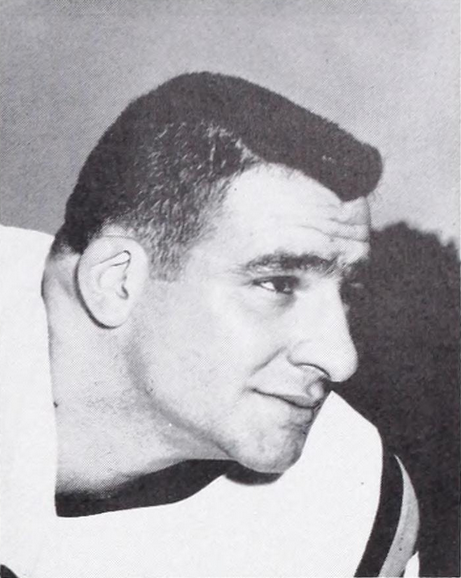
Lou Cordileone was drafted 12th overall by the New York Giants in the 1960 NFL Draft.

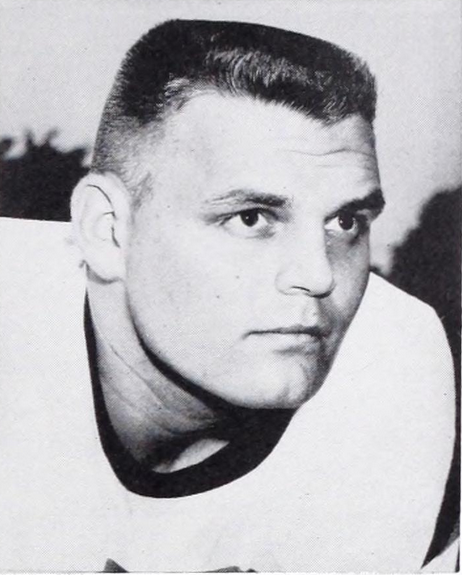
Harold Olson was drafted 13th overall by the St. Louis Cardinals in the 1960 NFL Draft.

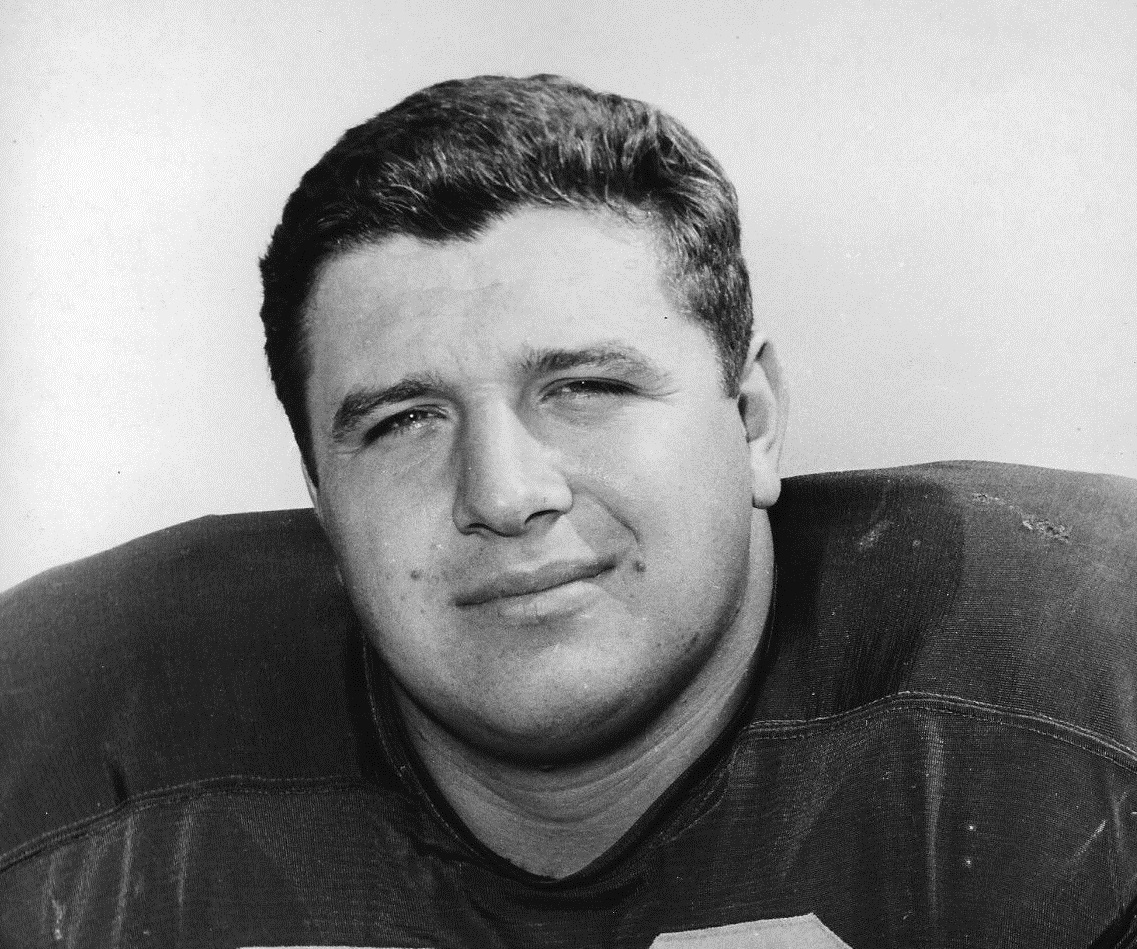
Don Chuy was drafted 38th overall by the Houston Oilers in the 1963 AFL Draft and 67th overall by the Los Angeles Rams in the 1963 NFL Draft.

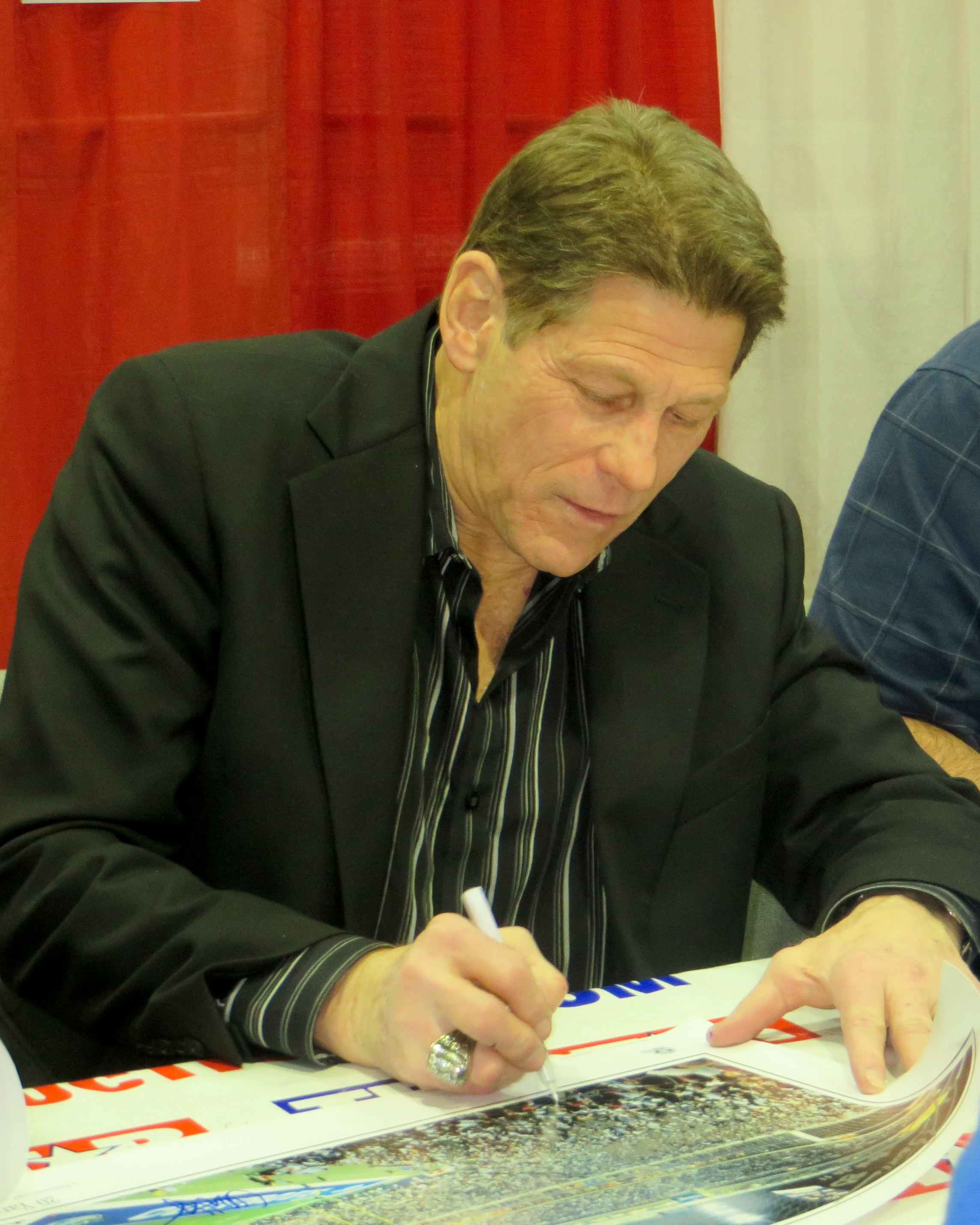
Charlie Waters was drafted 66th overall by the Dallas Cowboys in the 1970 NFL Draft.

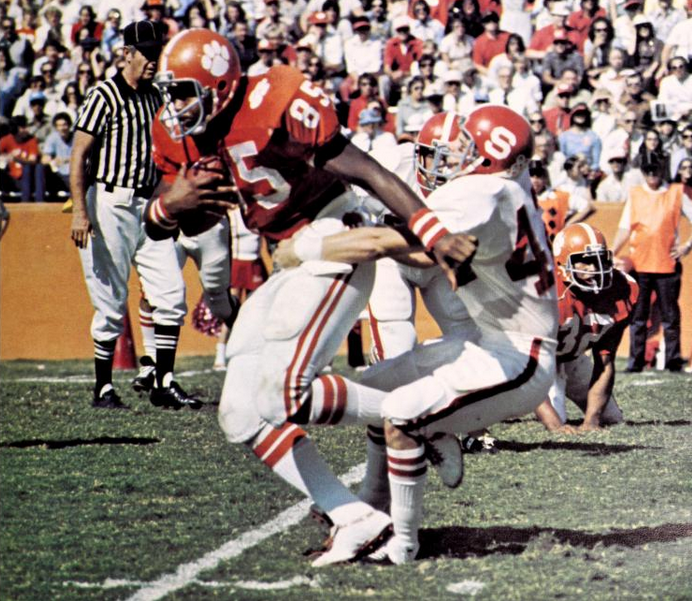
Bennie Cunningham was drafted 28th overall by the Pittsburgh Steelers in the 1976 NFL Draft.

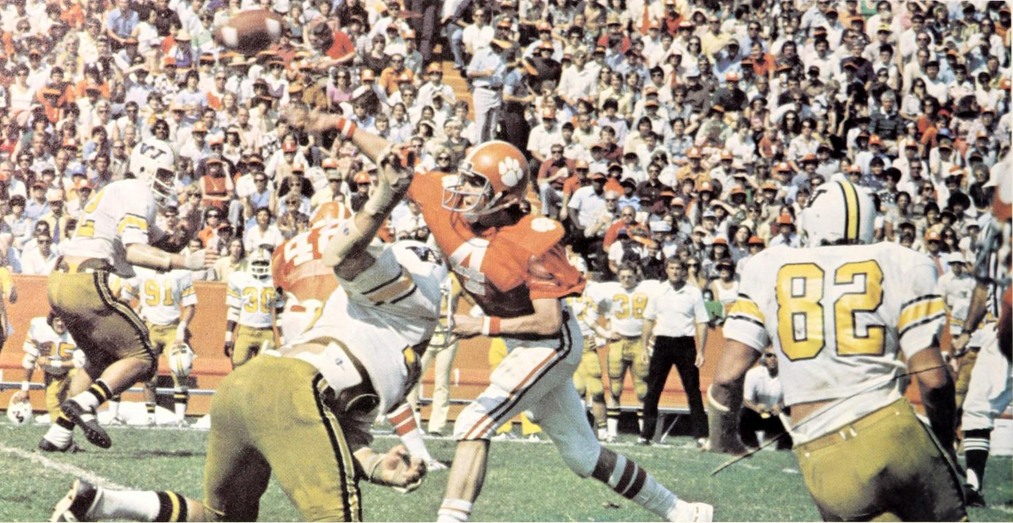
Steve Fuller was drafted 23rd overall by the Kansas City Chiefs in the 1979 NFL Draft.

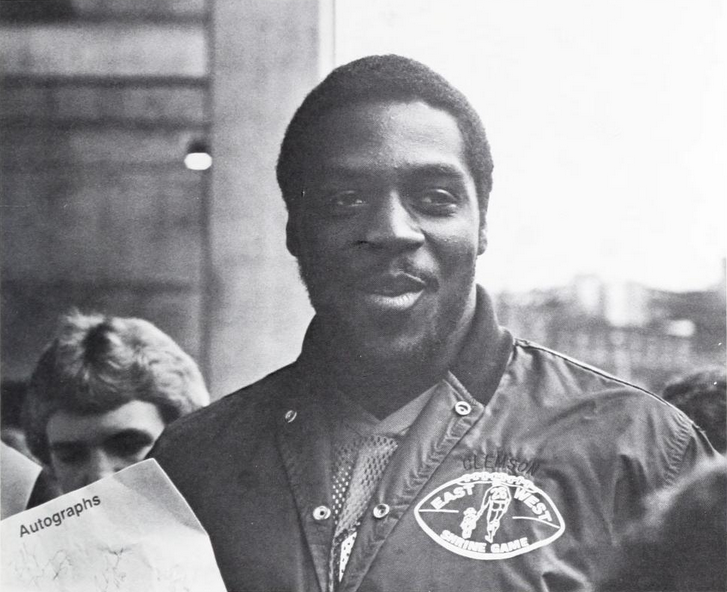
Jeff Bryant was drafted 6th overall by the Seattle Seahawks in the 1982 NFL Draft.

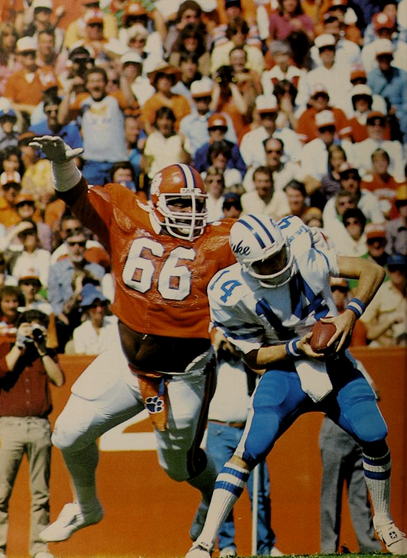
William Perry was drafted 22nd overall by the Chicago Bears in the 1985 NFL Draft.

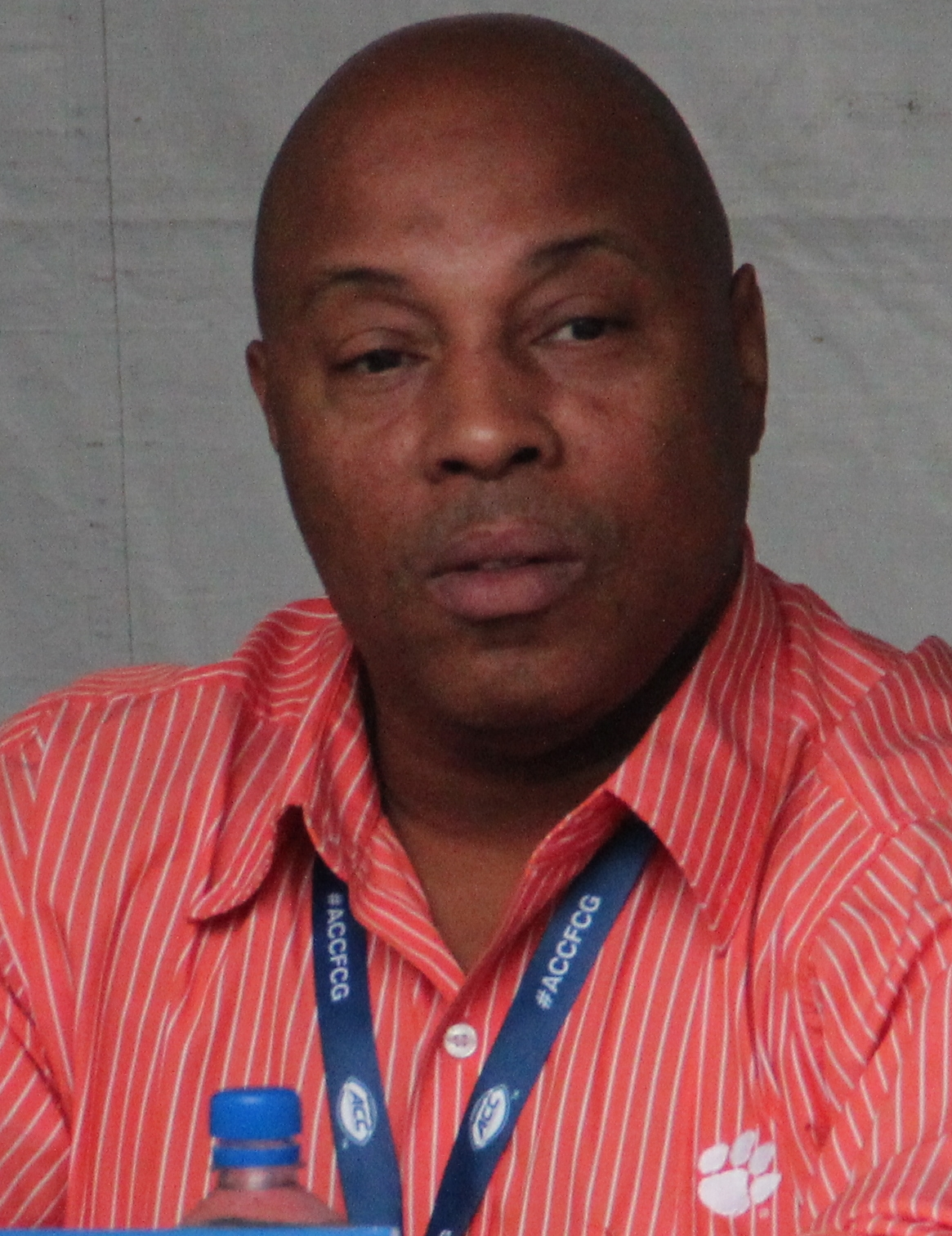
Donnell Woolford was drafted 11th overall by the Chicago Bears in the 1989 NFL Draft.

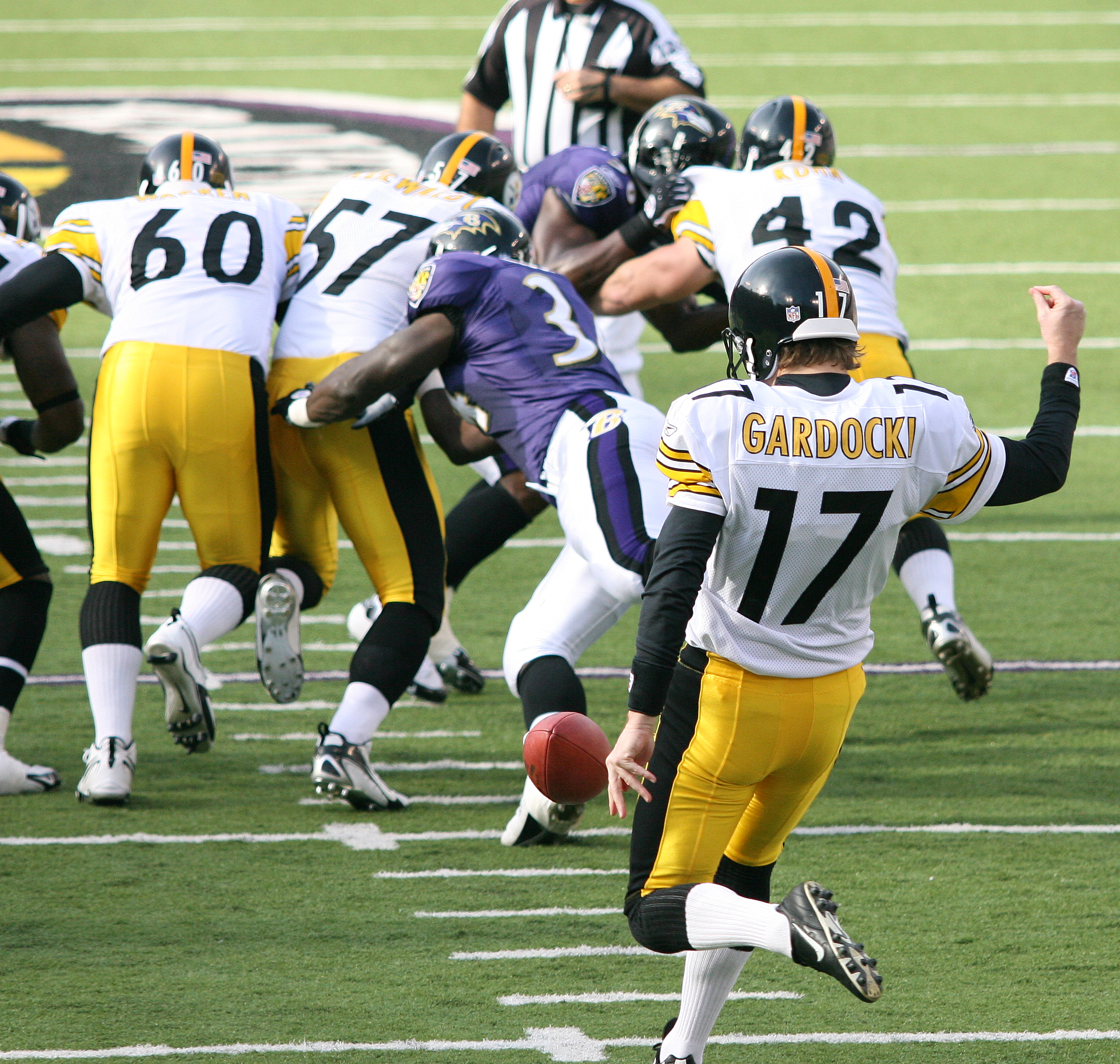
Chris Gardocki was drafted 78th overall by the Chicago Bears in the 1991 NFL Draft.

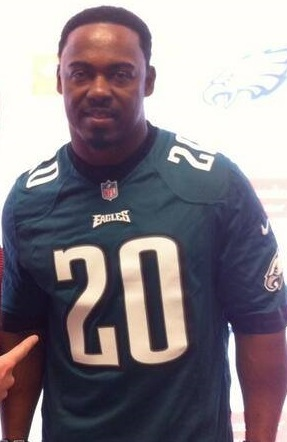
Brian Dawkins was drafted 61st overall by the Philadelphia Eagles in the 1995 NFL Draft.

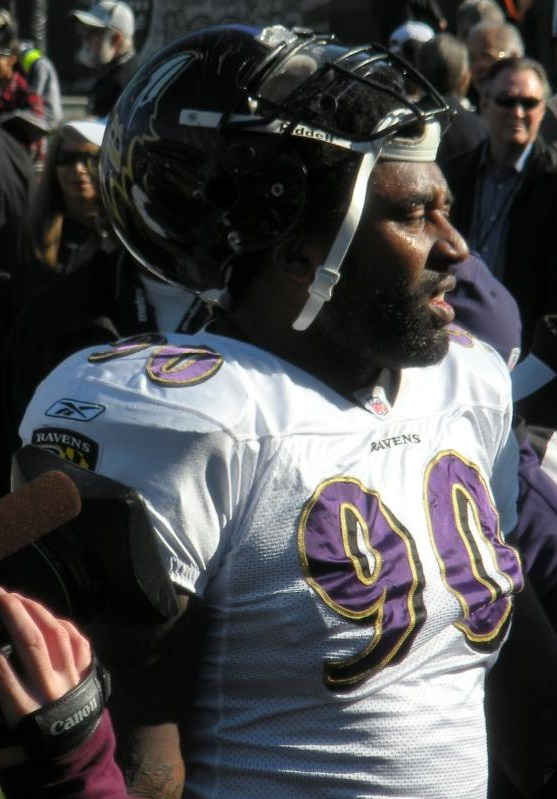
Trevor Pryce was drafted 28th overall by the Denver Broncos in the 1997 NFL Draft.

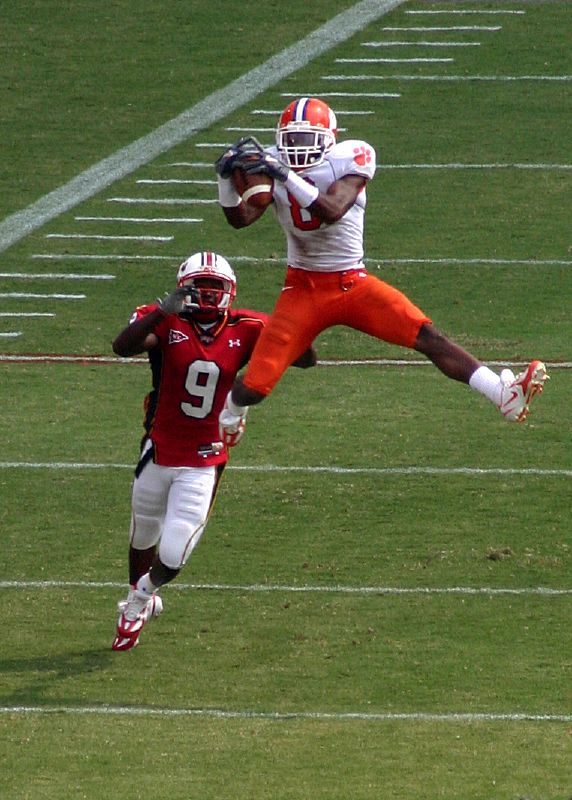
Tye Hill was drafted 15th overall by the St. Louis Rams in the 2006 NFL Draft.

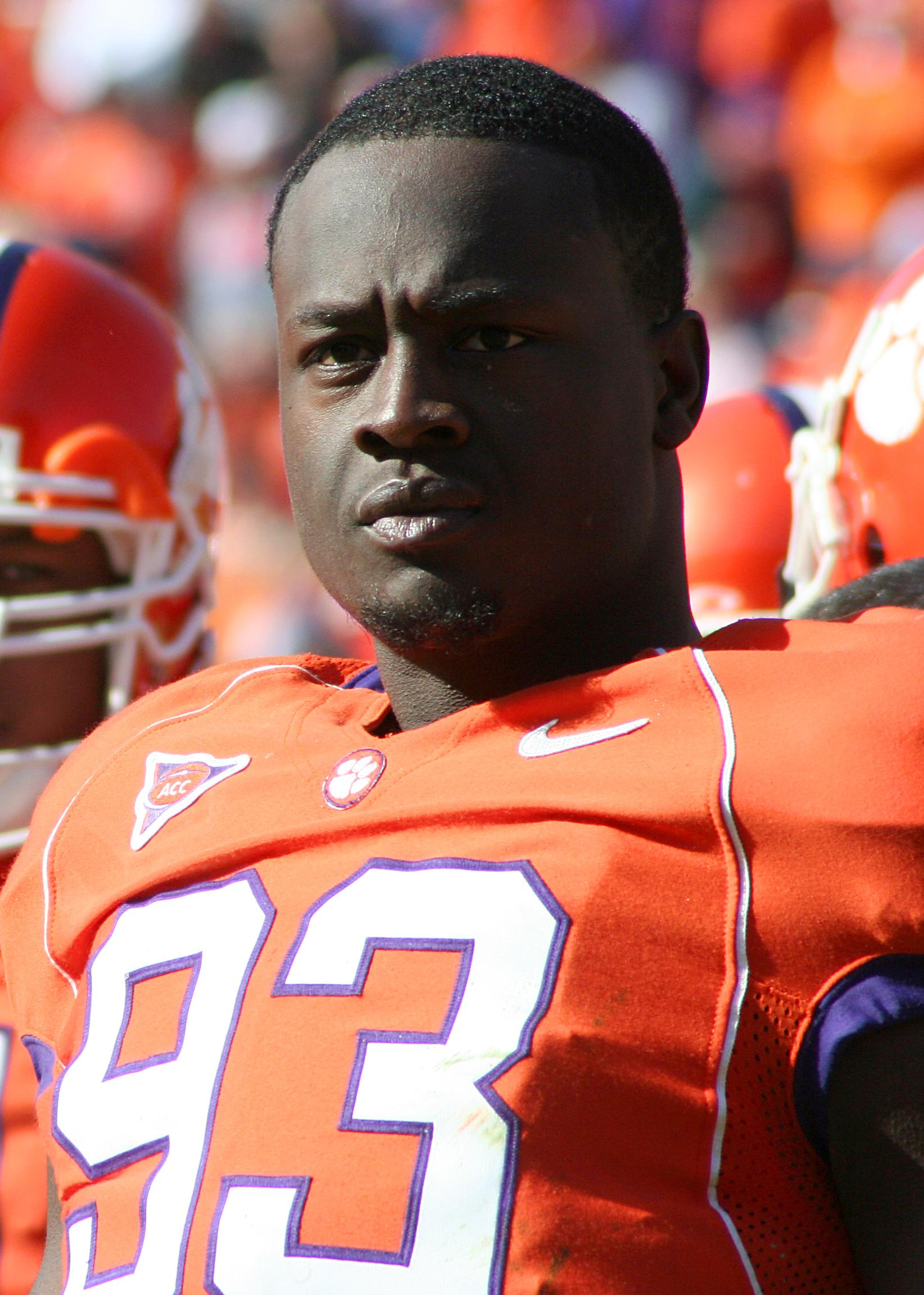
Gaines Adams was drafted 4th overall by the Tampa Bay Buccaneers in the 2007 NFL Draft.

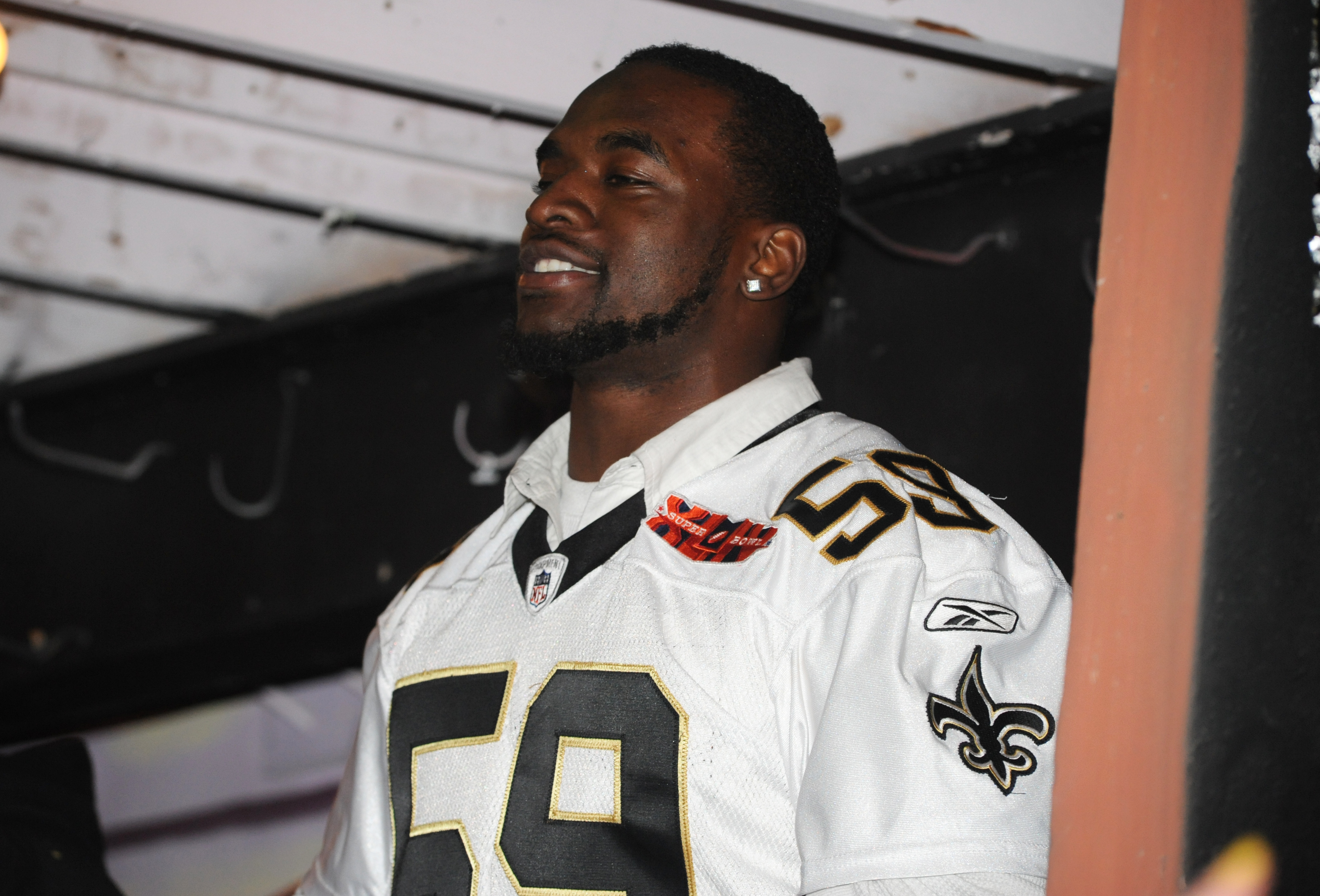
Anthony Waters was drafted 96th overall by the San Diego Chargers in the 2007 NFL Draft.

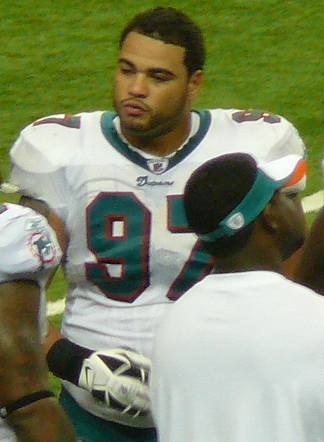
Phillip Merling was drafted 32nd overall by the Miami Dolphins in the 2008 NFL Draft.

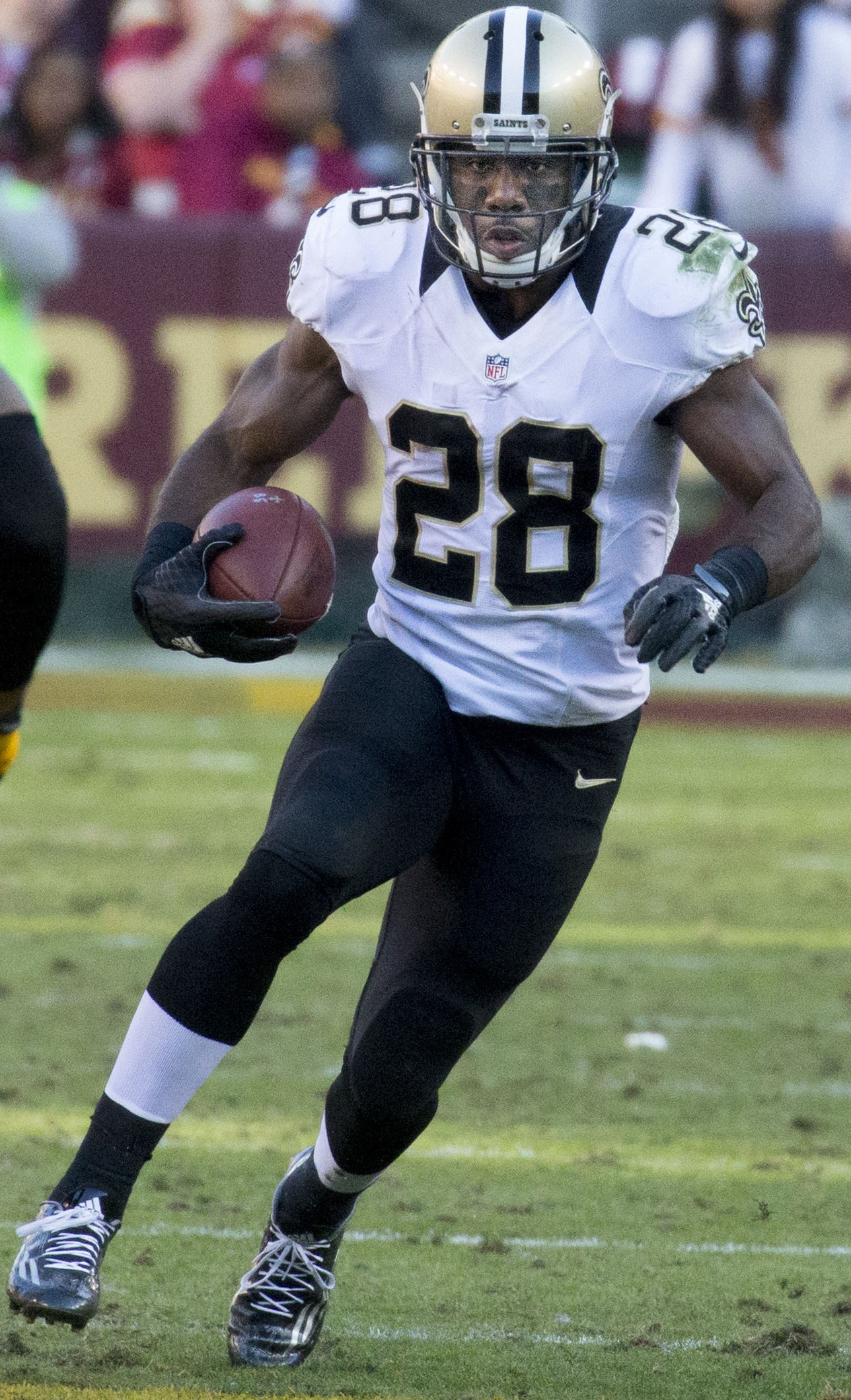
C. J. Spiller was drafted 9th overall by the Buffalo Bills in the 2010 NFL Draft.

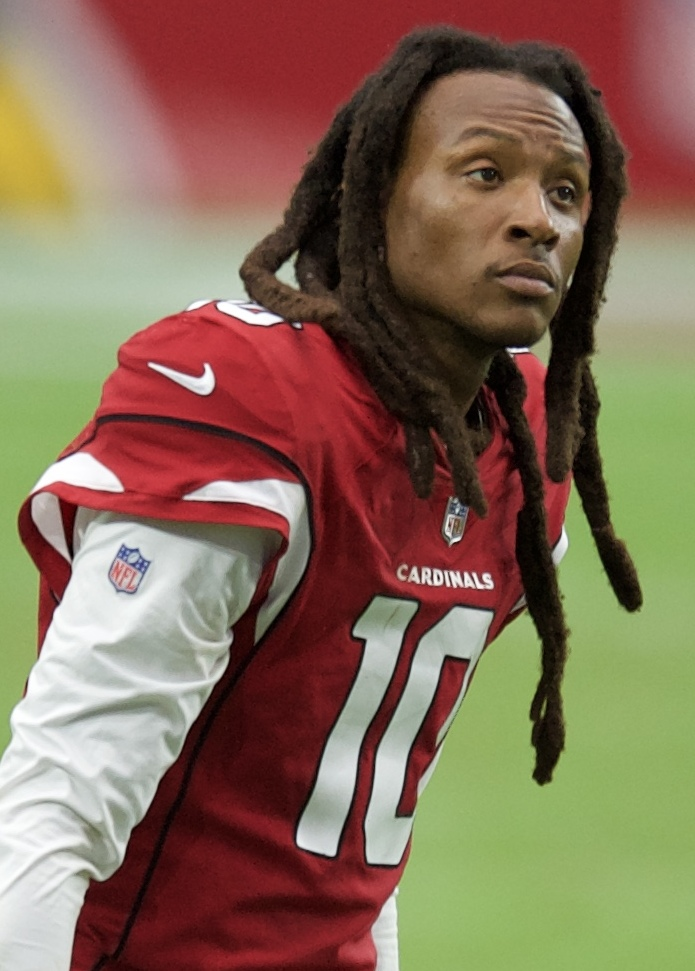
DeAndre Hopkins was drafted 27th overall by the Houston Texans in the 2013 NFL Draft.

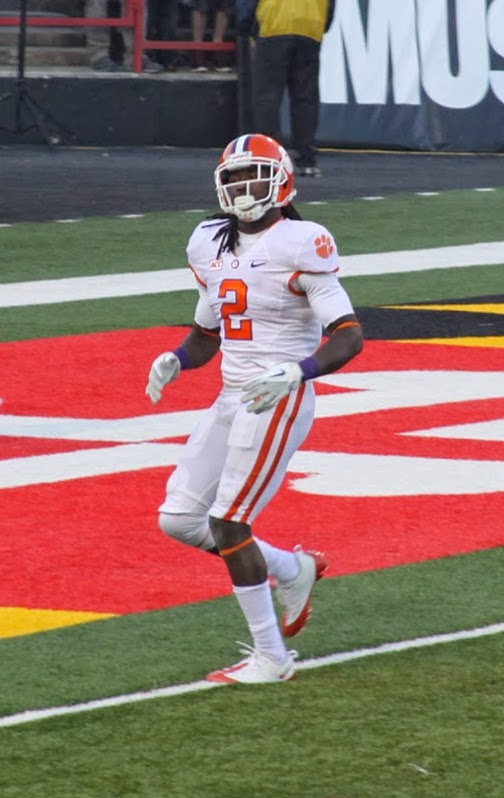
Sammy Watkins was drafted 4th overall by the Buffalo Bills in the 2014 NFL Draft.

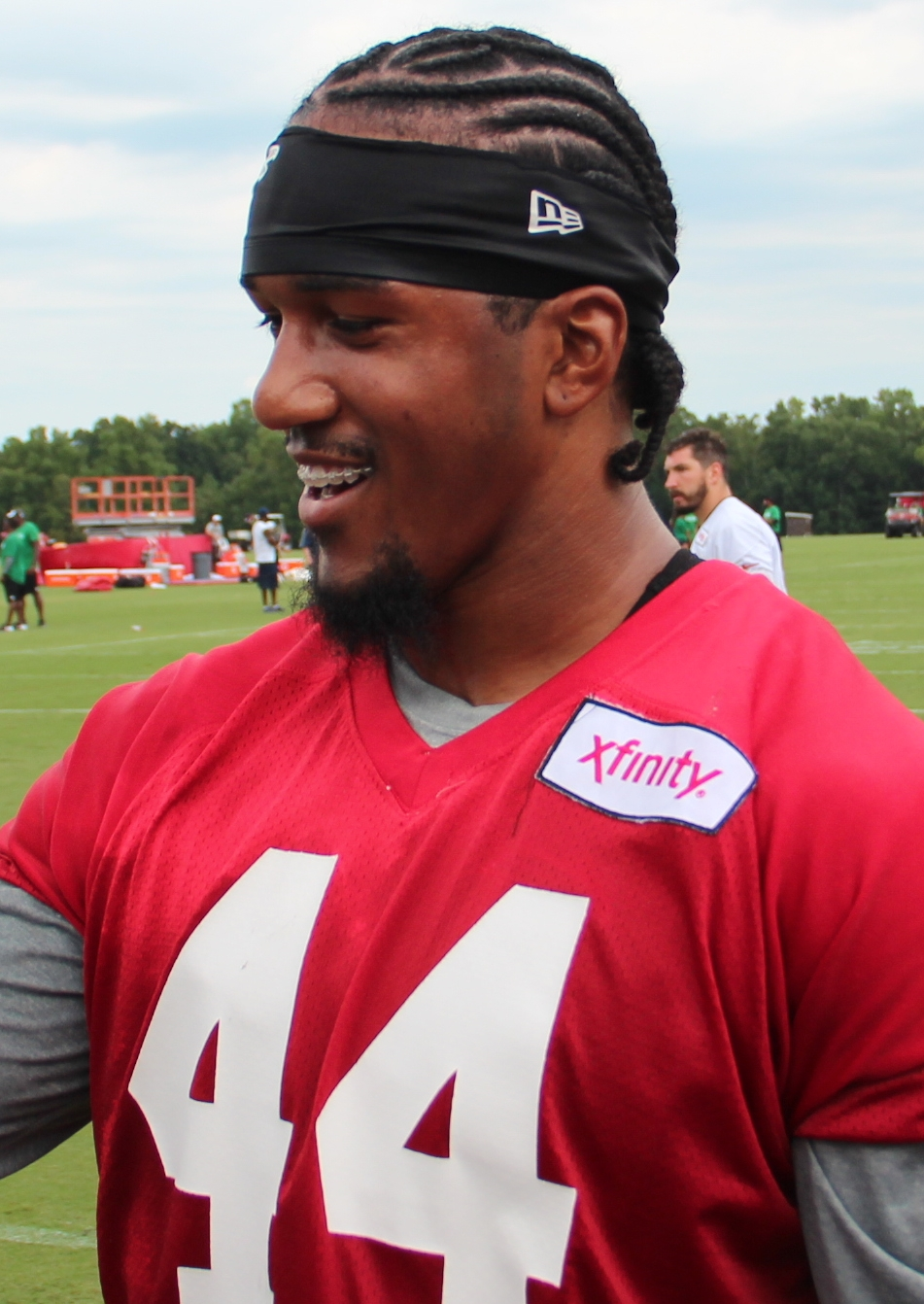
Vic Beasley was drafted 8th overall by the Atlanta Falcons in the 2015 NFL Draft.

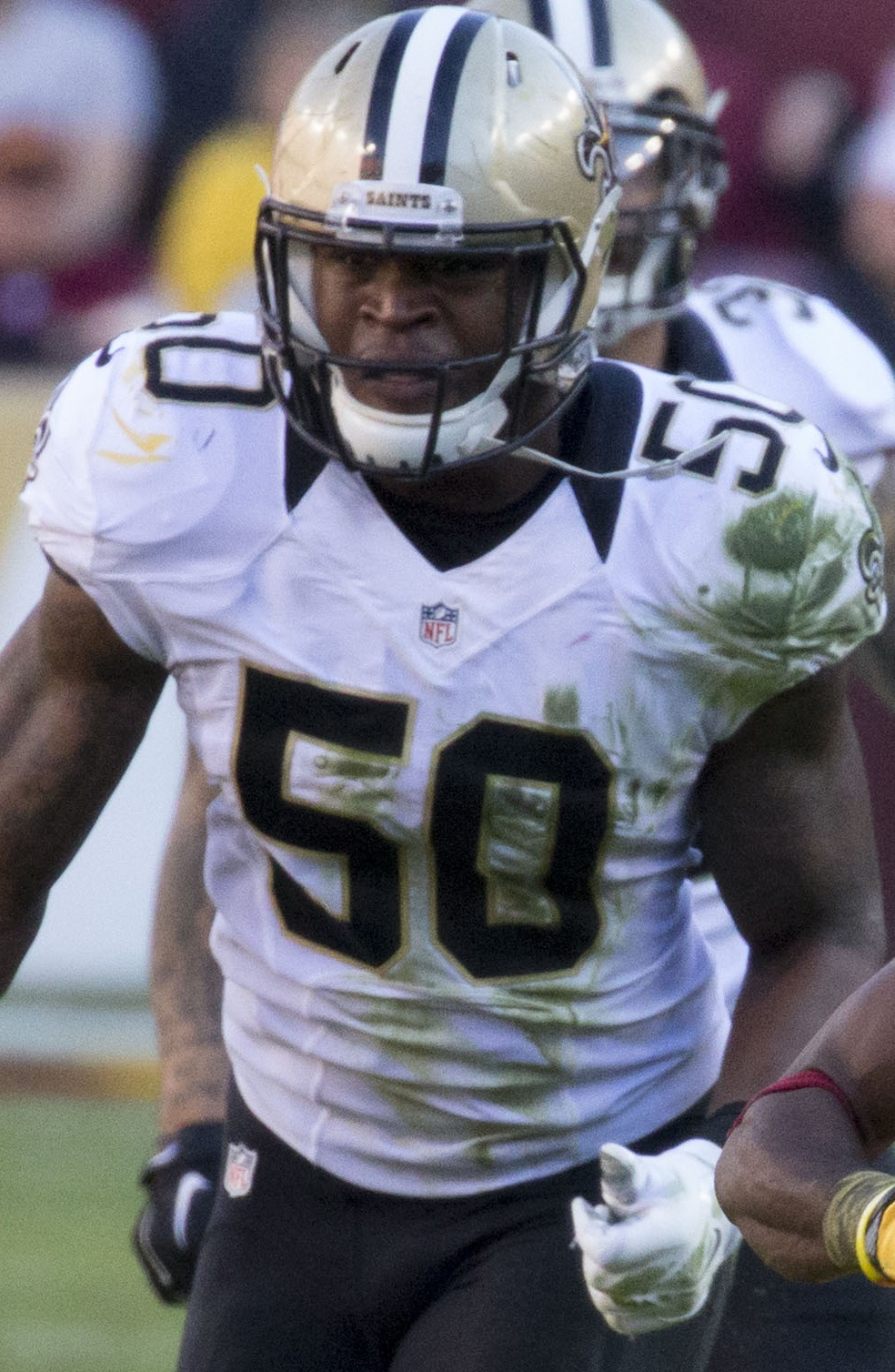
Stephone Anthony was drafted 31st overall by the New Orleans Saints in the 2015 NFL Draft.

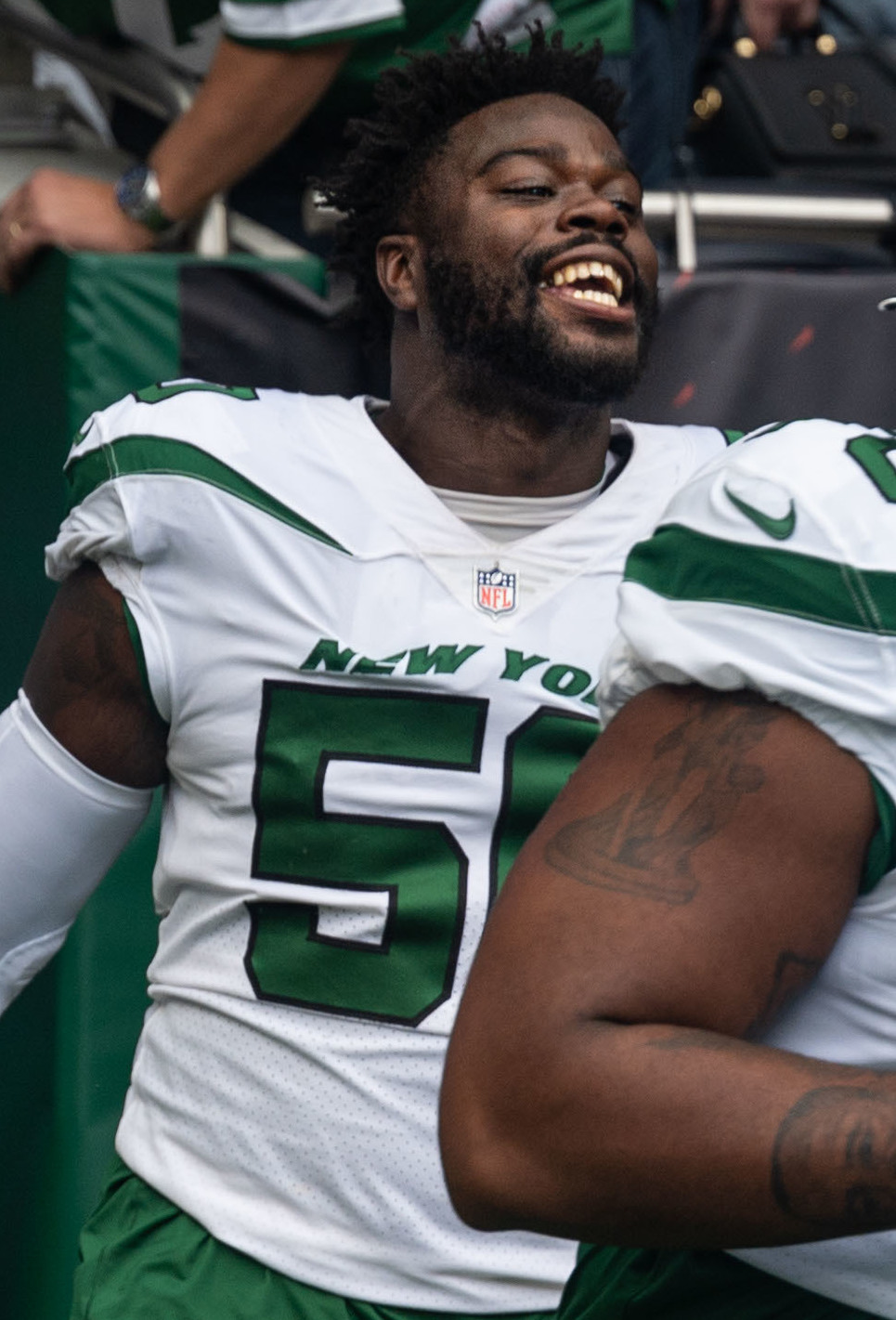
Shaq Lawson was drafted 19th overall by the Buffalo Bills in the 2016 NFL Draft.

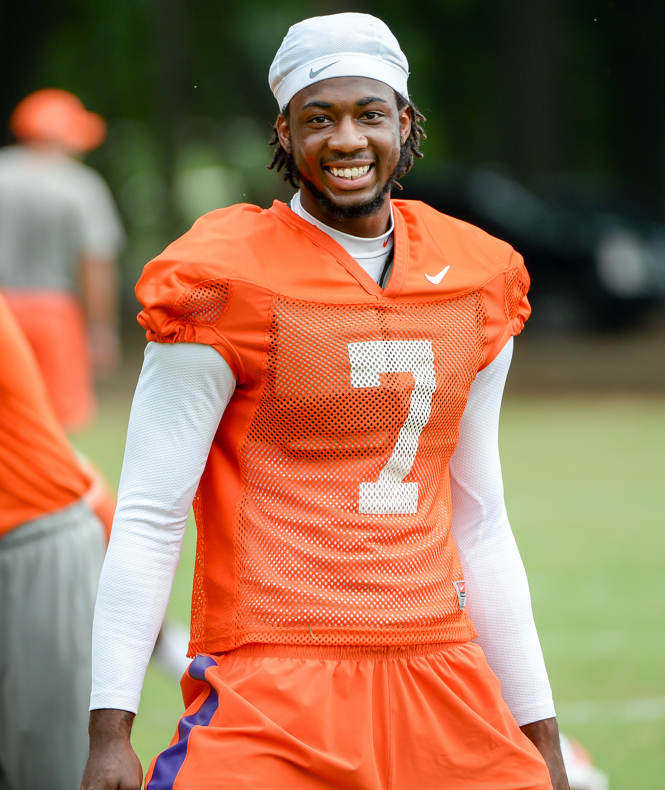
Mike Williams was drafted 7th overall by the Los Angeles Chargers in the 2017 NFL Draft.

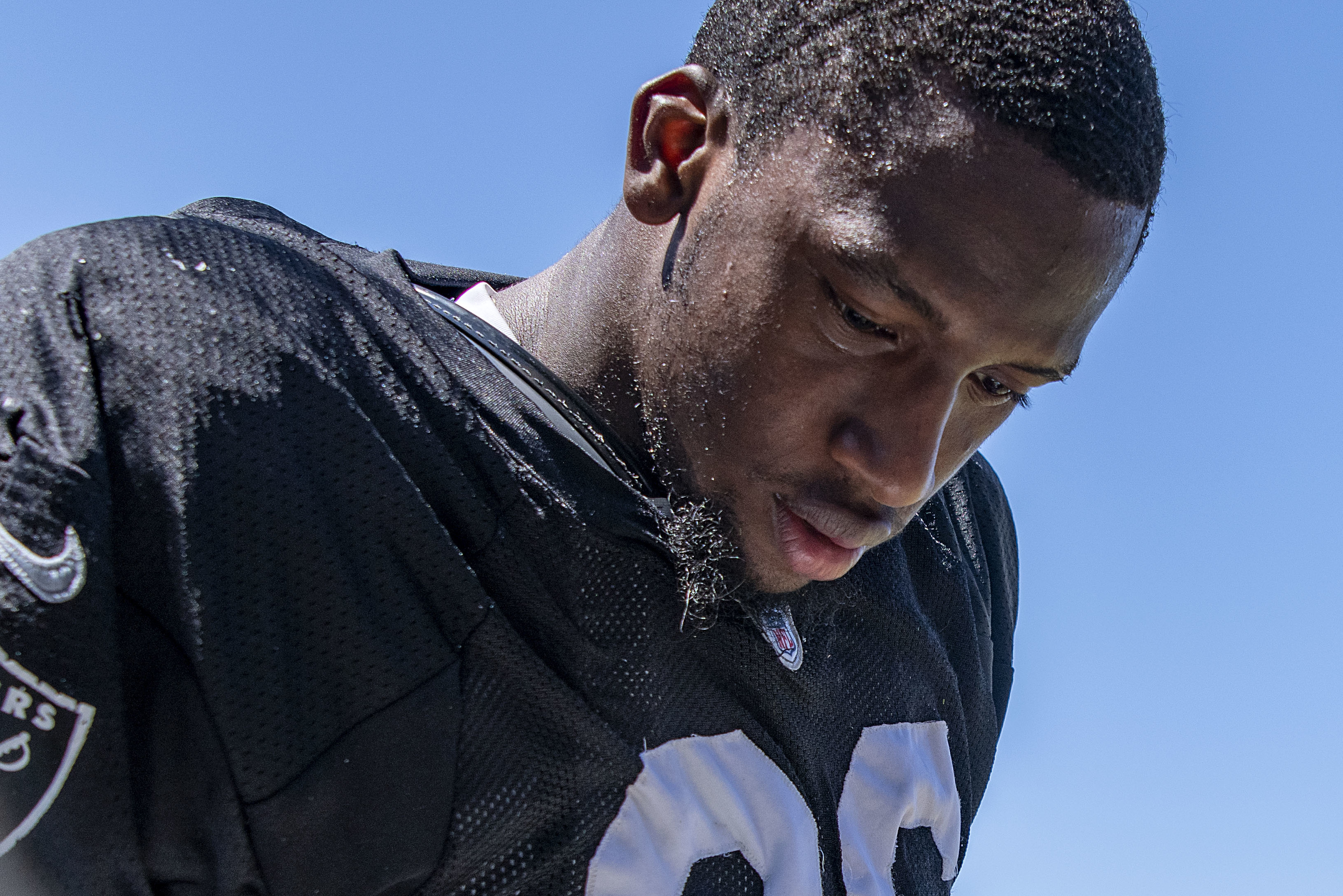
Clelin Ferrell was drafted 4th overall by the Oakland Raiders in the 2019 NFL Draft.

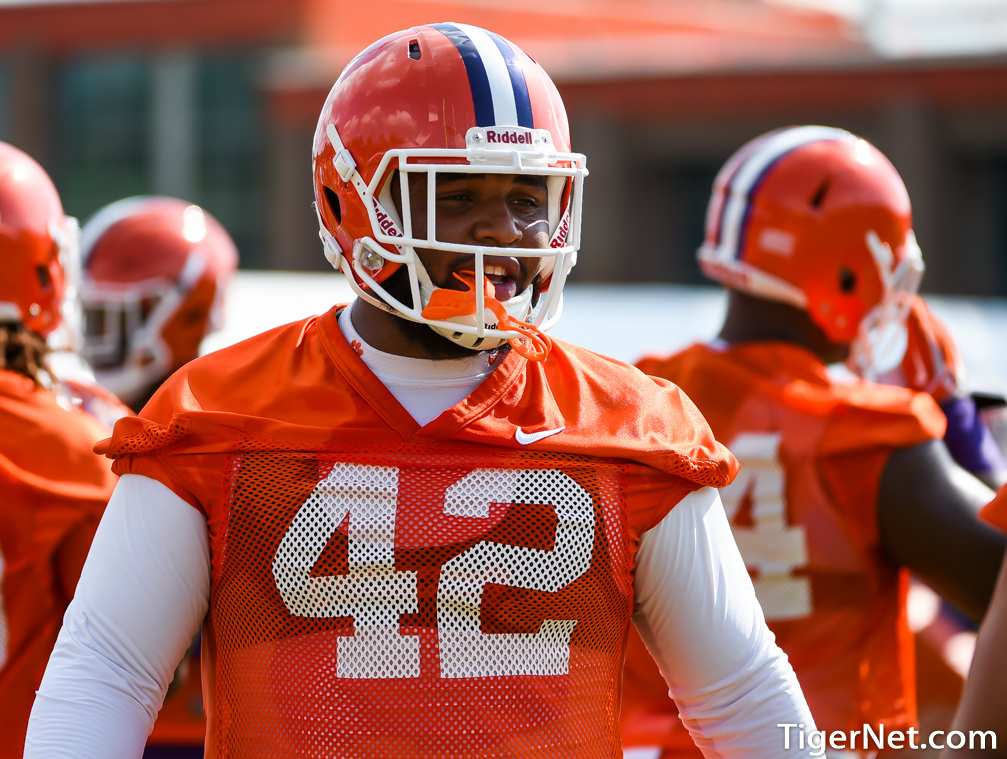
Christian Wilkins was drafted 13th overall by the Miami Dolphins in the 2019 NFL Draft.

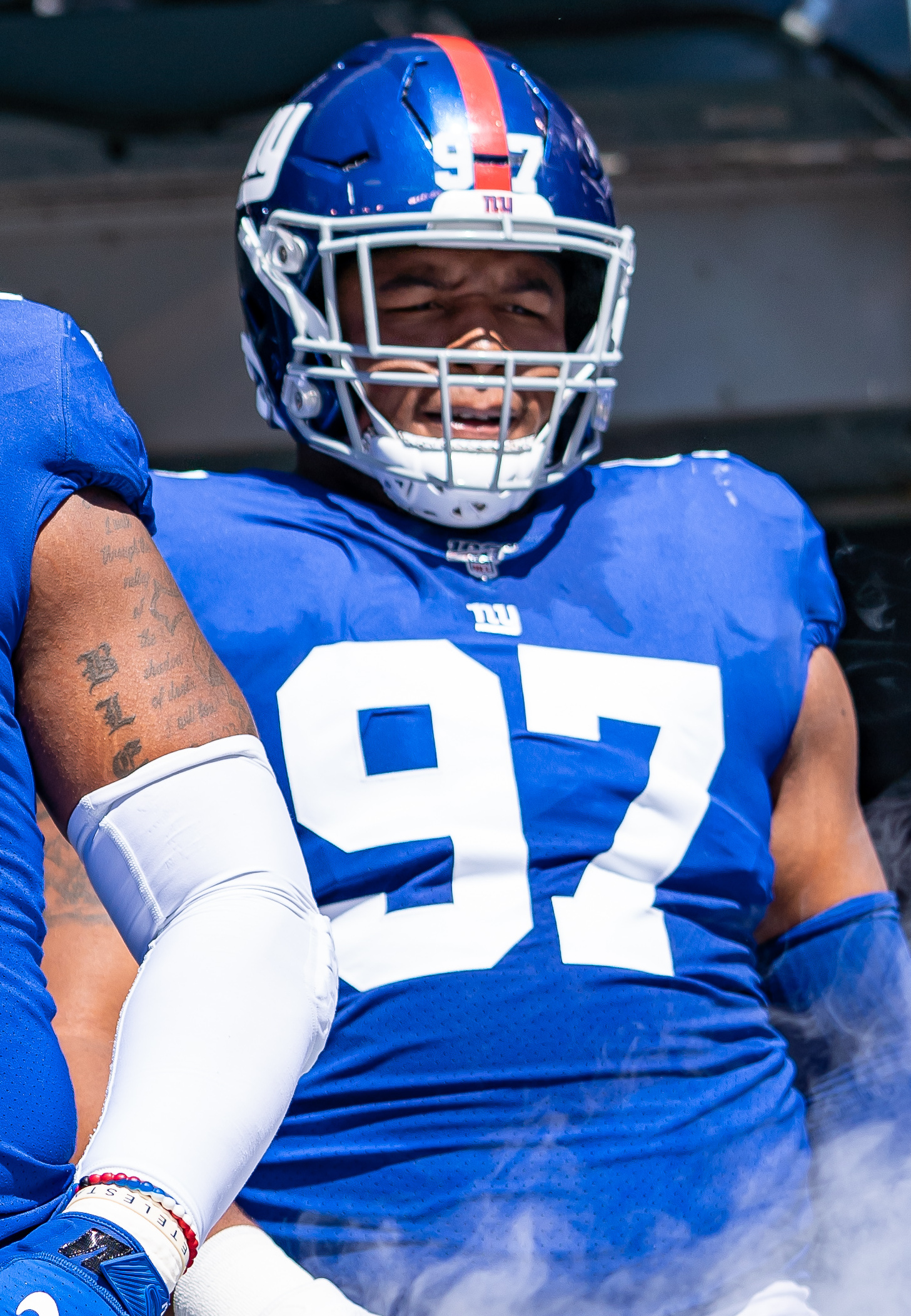
Dexter Lawrence was drafted 17th overall by the New York Giants in the 2019 NFL Draft.

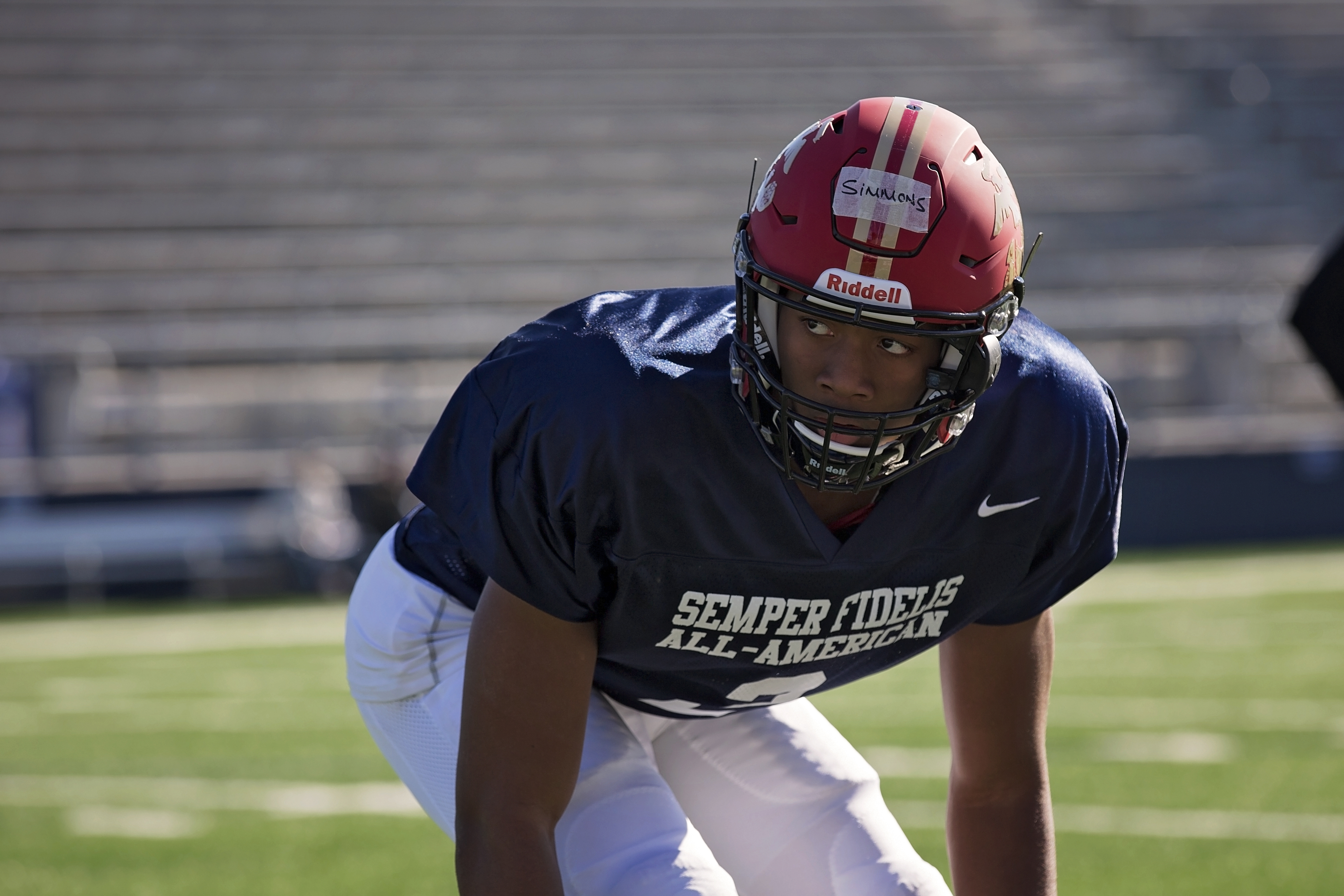
Isaiah Simmons was drafted 8th overall by the Arizona Cardinals in the 2020 NFL Draft.

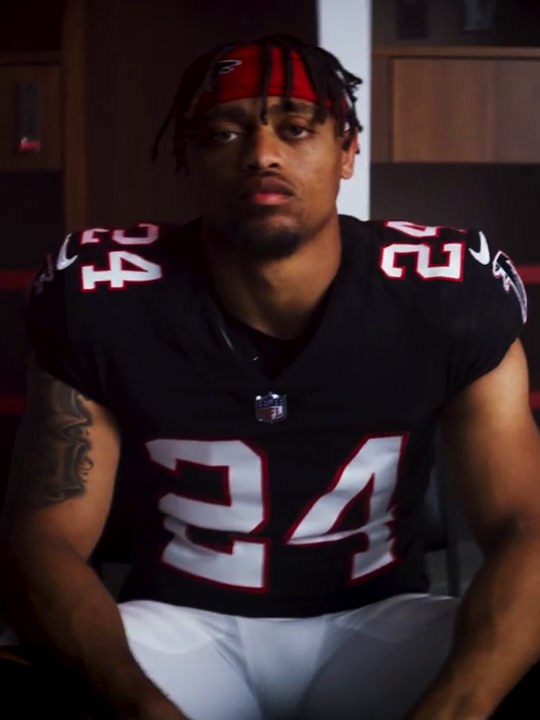
A. J. Terrell was drafted 16th overall by the Atlanta Falcons in the 2020 NFL Draft.

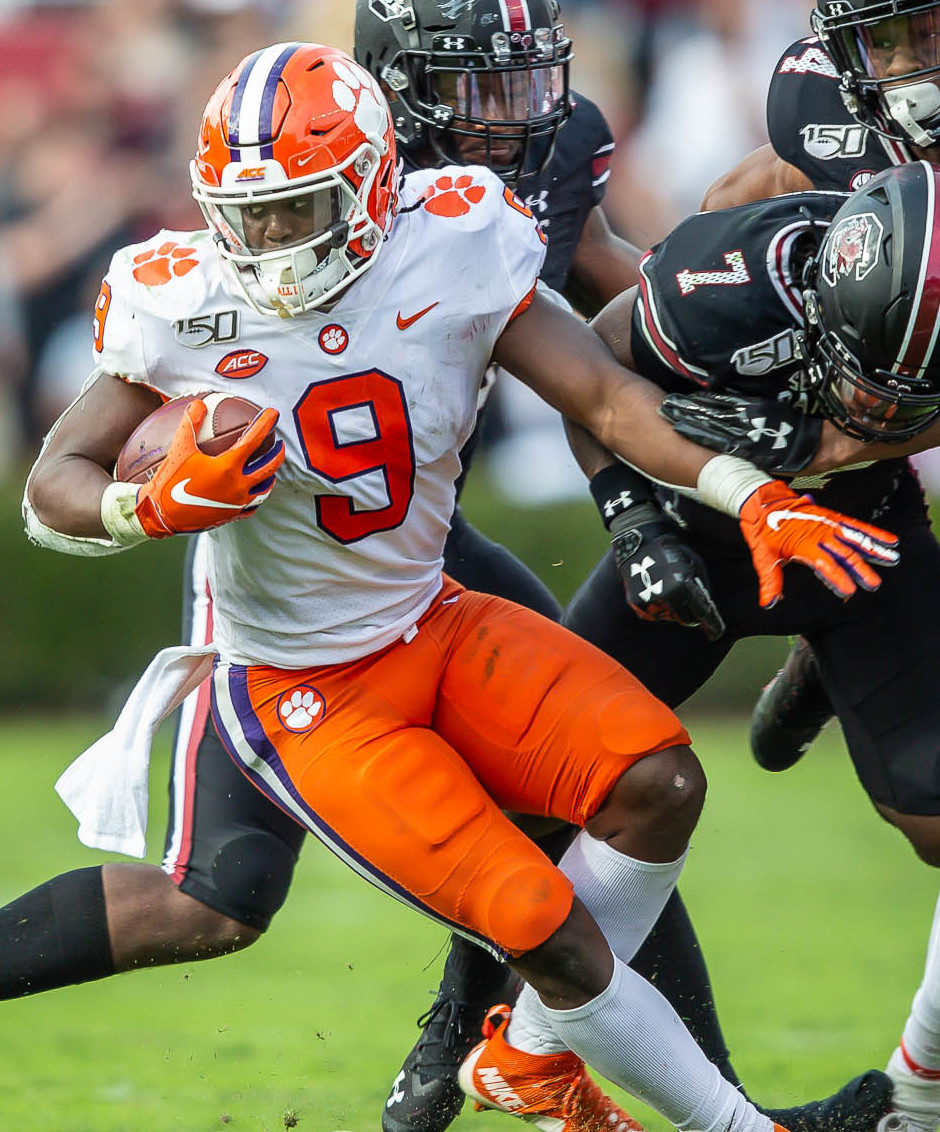
Travis Etienne was drafted 25th overall by the Jacksonville Jaguary in the 2021 NFL Draft.

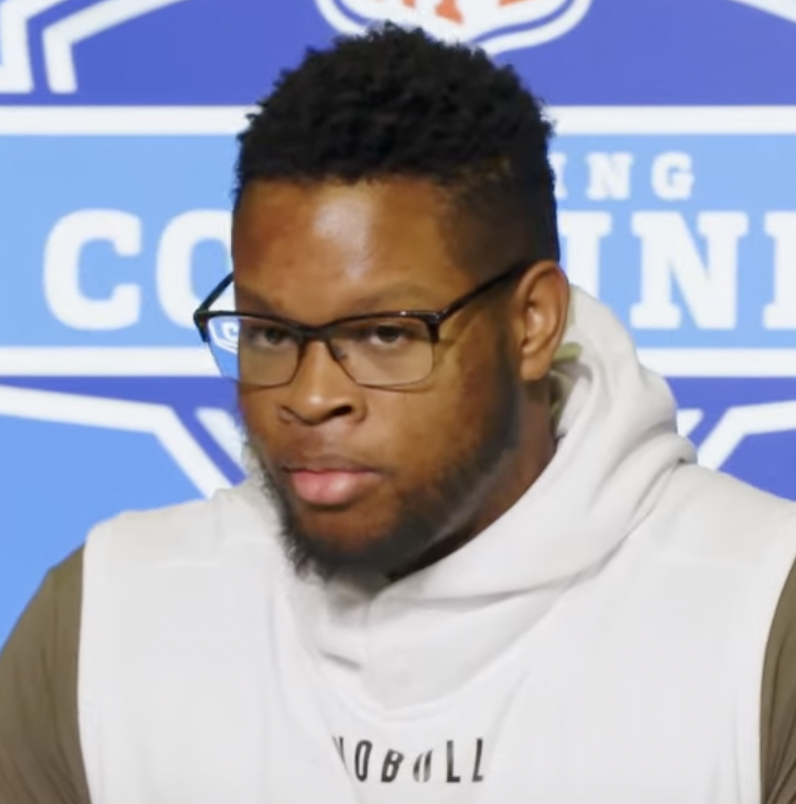
Myles Murphy was drafted 28th overall by the Cincinnati Bengals in the 2023 NFL Draft.

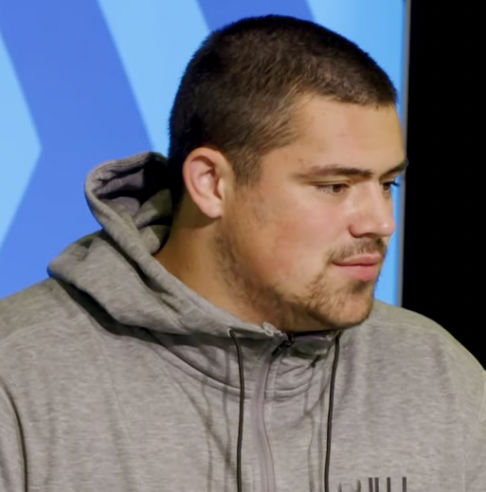
Bryan Bresee was drafted 29th overall by the New Orleans Saints in the 2023 NFL Draft.

Clemson Tigers selected in the NFL/AFL Drafts
Year	Round	Overall	Name	Position	Team	Notes
1939	5	40	Don Willis	B	New York Giants	—
1939	16	142	Gus Goins	E	Chicago Cardinals	—
1940	1	4	Banks McFadden	HB	Brooklyn Dodgers	—
1940	13	120	Joe Payne	G	New York Giants	—
1940	18	161	Lowell Bryant	B	Chicago Cardinals	—
1942	5	35	Joe Blalock	E	Detroit Lions	—
1943	20	189	Marion Butler	B	Chicago Bears	—
1945	10	93	Bill Poe	B	Chicago Bears	—
1946	6	43	Marion Woods	G	Pittsburgh Steelers	—
1946	15	136	Jim Hough	B	Green Bay Packers	—
1946	29	276	Francis Saunders	T	Green Bay Packers	—
1947	16	138	Ralph Jenkins	C	Pittsburgh Steelers	—
1948	27	246	Tom Salisbury	T	New York Giants	—
1949	1	6	Bob Gage	DB, TB	Pittsburgh Steelers	—
1949	7	71	Frank Gillespie	G	Philadelphia Eagles	—
1951	3	27	Fred Cone	FB, K	Green Bay Packers	—
1951	7	81	Ray Mathews	HB, E	Pittsburgh Steelers	—
1951	11	131	Steve Wyndham	B	New York Yanks	—
1951	12	146	Bob Hudson	DB, LB, E	New York Giants	—
1951	22	262	Dick Hendley	QB	Pittsburgh Steelers	—
1951	25	300	Jackie Calvert	T	Los Angeles Rams	—
1952	5	59	Robert Patton	G	New York Giants	—
1952	13	148	Billy Hair	B	Green Bay Packers	—
1953	6	66	Tom Barton	G	Pittsburgh Steelers	—
1953	10	121	Dreher Gaskin	E	Detroit Lions	—
1953	18	209	Jim Shirley	B	Chicago Bears	—
1953	29	340	Earl Wrightenberry	T	Chicago Cardinals	—
1954	24	285	Nate Grissette	T	Philadelphia Eagles	—
1955	16	190	Clyde White	G	Philadelphia Eagles	—
1955	21	244	Buck George	B	Washington Redskins	—
1955	28	334	Wingo Avery	C	Philadelphia Eagles	—
1956	4	43	Ben Inabinet	T	Baltimore Colts	—
1956	22	254	Dick Marazza	T	Detroit Lions	—
1956	25	292	Bill O'Dell	B	Pittsburgh Steelers	—
1957	2	18	Joel Wells	HB	Green Bay Packers	—
1957	3	34	Bill Hudson*	DT	Chicago Cardinals	AFL All-Star (1961)
1958	17	200	Bill Thomas	C	Los Angeles Rams	—
1958	24	280	Jim Padgett	C	Philadelphia Eagles	—
1959	14	158	Jack Smith	T	Philadelphia Eagles	—
1959	14	162	Mike Dukes^{†}	LB	San Francisco 49ers	AFL Champion (1960, 1961)
1959	16	192	Morris Keller	T	Baltimore Colts	—
1959	20	230	Jim Payne	G	Philadelphia Eagles	—
1959	20	235	Rudy Hayes	LB	Pittsburgh Steelers	—
1960	1	12	Lou Cordileone	DT, DE, G	New York Giants	—
1960	2	13	Harold Olson*	T	St. Louis Cardinals	AFL All-Star (1961)
1960	8	88	Bill Mathis^{†}	FB, HB	San Francisco 49ers	Super Bowl Champion (III)
1960	14	168	Doug Cline^{†}	LB, FB	New York Giants	AFL Champion (1960)
1961^{AFL draft}	9	68	Lowndes Shingler (Note: Lowndes Shingler was drafted in 1961 by the Oakland Raiders (68th overall) and by the Dallas Cowboys (156th overall).)	QB	Oakland Raiders	—
1961^{AFL draft}	14	112	Jimmy King (Note: Jimmy King was drafted in 1961 by the Houston Oilers (112th overall) and by the St. Louis Cardinals (134th overall).)	T	Houston Oilers	—
1961^{NFL draft}	5	63	Ron Osborne (Note: Ron Osborne was drafted in 1961 by the Baltimore Colts (63rd overall) and in 1962 by the Houston Oilers (231st overall).)	T	Baltimore Colts	—
1961^{NFL draft}	10	134	Jimmy King	T	St. Louis Cardinals	—
1961^{NFL draft}	12	156	Lowndes Shingler	QB	Dallas Cowboys	—
1962^{AFL draft}	9	69	Gary Barnes^{†} (Note: Gary Barnes was drafted in 1962 by the New York Titans (69th overall) and by the Green Bay Packers (41st overall).)	WR	New York Titans	NFL Champion (1962)
1962^{AFL draft}	29	231	Ron Osborne	T	Houston Oilers	—
1962^{NFL draft}	3	41	Gary Barnes^{†}	WR	Green Bay Packers	NFL Champion (1962)
1963^{AFL draft}	5	38	Don Chuy (Note: Don Chuy was drafted in 1963 by the Houston Oilers (38th overall) and by the Los Angeles Rams (67th overall).)	G	Houston Oilers	—
1963^{NFL draft}	5	67	Don Chuy	G	Los Angeles Rams	—
1964^{AFL draft}	15	118	Pat Crain (Note: Pat Crain was drafted in 1964 by the Houston Oilers (118th overall) and by the Chicago Bears (23rd overall).)	FB	Houston Oilers	—
1964^{NFL draft}	2	23	Pat Crain	HB	Chicago Bears	—
1964^{NFL draft}	8	102	Bob Poole	TE	San Francisco 49ers	—
1964^{NFL draft}	14	190	John Case	E	Baltimore Colts	—
1965	17	237	John Boyette	T	Cleveland Browns	—
1966	12	177	Rickey Johnson	T	St. Louis Cardinals	—
1966	12	182	Wayne Page	DE	Chicago Bears	—
1967	14	360	Floyd Rogers	T	Cleveland Browns	—
1968	3	64	Harry Olszewski	G	Cleveland Browns	—
1968	4	99	Wayne Mass	T	Chicago Bears	—
1968	5	134	Jackie Jackson	RB	Cleveland Browns	—
1968	9	230	Frank Liberatore	DB	Washington Redskins	—
1969	8	201	Wayne Mulligan	C, T	St. Louis Cardinals	—
1969	14	344	John Cagle	DE	Boston Patriots	—
1970	3	66	Charlie Waters^{*†}	DB	Dallas Cowboys	Pro Bowl (1976, 1977, 1978); Super Bowl Champion (VI, XII)
1970	11	283	Ivan Southerland	T	Dallas Cowboys	—
1970	14	347	Jack King	G	San Francisco 49ers	—
1971	2	30	Dave Thompson	T, C, G	Detroit Lions	—
1972	3	63	John McMakin^{†}	TE	Pittsburgh Steelers	Super Bowl Champion (IX)
1972	9	217	Don Kelley	DB	Pittsburgh Steelers	—
1972	14	346	Larry Hefner	LB	Green Bay Packers	—
1973	6	155	Rick Harrell	C	New York Jets	—
1973	11	266	Ed Seigler	K	Chicago Bears	—
1974	6	131	Jay Washington	RB	Kansas City Chiefs	—
1976	1	28	Bennie Cunningham^{†}	TE	Pittsburgh Steelers	Super Bowl Champion (XIII, XIV)
1976	10	282	Don Testerman	RB	Miami Dolphins	—
1976	11	303	Craig Brantley	WR	New York Giants	—
1976	15	424	Gary Alexander	T	Baltimore Colts	—
1978	5	127	Archie Reese^{†}	DE, NT, DT	San Francisco 49ers	Super Bowl Champion (XVI)
1978	8	213	Roy Eppes	DB	New York Jets	—
1978	11	305	Lacy Brumley	T	Denver Broncos	—
1979	1	5	Jerry Butler*	WR	Buffalo Bills	Pro Bowl (1980)
1979	1	23	Steve Fuller^{†}	QB	Kansas City Chiefs	Super Bowl Champion (XX)
1979	3	64	Joe Bostic	G, T	St. Louis Cardinals	—
1979	4	92	Jon Brooks	LB	Detroit Lions	—
1979	10	249	Dwight Clark^{*†}	WR	San Francisco 49ers	Pro Bowl (1981, 1982); Super Bowl Champion (XVI, XIX)
1979	11	277	Stan Rome	WR	Kansas City Chiefs	—
1980	1	20	Jim Stuckey^{†}	DE	San Francisco 49ers	Super Bowl Champion (XVI, XIX)
1980	7	189	Lester Brown	RB	Dallas Cowboys	—
1980	12	324	Marvin Sims	FB	Baltimore Colts	—
1981	6	140	Steve Durham	DE	Seattle Seahawks	—
1981	7	178	Obed Ariri	K	Baltimore Colts	—
1982	1	6	Jeff Bryant	DE, DT	Seattle Seahawks	—
1982	1	19	Perry Tuttle	WR	Buffalo Bills	—
1982	5	128	Jeff Davis	LB	Tampa Bay Buccaneers	—
1982	7	188	Hollis Hall	DB	San Diego Chargers	—
1982	9	225	Tony Berryhill	C	Baltimore Colts	—
1982	12	327	Brian Clark	G	Denver Broncos	—
1983	1	10	Terry Kinard	DB	New York Giants	—
1983	3	66	Cliff Austin	RB	New Orleans Saints	—
1983	4	101	Johnny Rembert*	LB	New England Patriots	Pro Bowl (1988, 1989)
1983	5	135	Chuck McSwain	RB	Dallas Cowboys	—
1983	7	194	Jeff McCall	RB	Los Angeles Raiders	—
1983	8	205	Andy Headen^{†}	LB	New York Giants	Super Bowl Champion (XXI)
1983	11	282	Danny Triplett	LB	Los Angeles Rams	—
1983	11	290	Bob Mayberry	G	Seattle Seahawks	—
1983	11	298	Brian Butcher	G	Minnesota Vikings	—
1983	12	318	Frank Magwood	WR	New York Giants	—
1984	3	63	Rod McSwain	DB	Atlanta Falcons	—
1984	6	143	Jim Scott	DE	New York Giants	—
1984	8	213	Bob Pauling	K	St. Louis Cardinals	—
1984	11	295	Edgar Pickett	LB	Minnesota Vikings	—
1984	12	320	William Devane	DT	Miami Dolphins	—
1984	12	326	Murry Jarman	WR	Denver Broncos	—
1985	1	22	William Perry^{†}	DT, DE	Chicago Bears	Super Bowl Champion (XX)
1985	3	58	Tyrone Davis	DB	New York Giants	—
1985	3	77	Dale Hatcher	P	Los Angeles Rams	—
1985	5	116	K. D. Dunn	TE	St. Louis Cardinals	—
1985	6	152	Reggie Pleasant	DB	Atlanta Falcons	—
1985	10	260	Donald Igwebuike	K	Tampa Bay Buccaneers	—
1987	1	25	Terrence Flagler^{†}	RB	San Francisco 49ers	Super Bowl Champion (XXIII, XXIV)
1987	2	31	Kenny Flowers	RB	Atlanta Falcons	—
1987	2	38	Delton Hall	DB	Pittsburgh Steelers	—
1987	4	103	Jim Riggs	TE	Cincinnati Bengals	—
1988	2	50	Michael Dean Perry*	DT, DE	Cleveland Browns	Pro Bowl (1989, 1990, 1991, 1993, 1994, 1996)
1988	3	81	Tony Stephens	DT	New Orleans Saints	—
1988	12	322	James Earle	LB	Pittsburgh Steelers	—
1989	1	11	Donnell Woolford*	DB	Chicago Bears	Pro Bowl (1993)
1989	4	97	Jake McCullough	DE	Denver Broncos	—
1989	5	113	Keith Jennings	TE	Dallas Cowboys	—
1989	10	257	Ty Granger	T	Tampa Bay Buccaneers	—
1989	10	271	Tracy Johnson	RB	Houston Oilers	—
1990	9	241	Terry Allen*	RB	Minnesota Vikings	Pro Bowl (1996)
1990	10	260	Gary Cooper	WR	New Orleans Saints	—
1990	10	274	Otis Moore	DT	New York Giants	—
1991	2	41	Jerome Henderson	DB	New England Patriots	—
1991	2	51	Doug Thomas	WR	Seattle Seahawks	—
1991	2	53	John Johnson	LB	San Francisco 49ers	—
1991	3	78	Chris Gardocki^{*†}	P	Chicago Bears	Pro Bowl (1996); Super Bowl Champion (XL)
1991	4	86	Dexter Davis	DB	Phoenix Cardinals	—
1991	5	117	Vince Hammond	DT	Phoenix Cardinals	—
1991	10	271	Eric Harmon	G	Philadelphia Eagles	—
1991	11	301	Stacy Long	G	Chicago Bears	—
1992	1	16	Chester McGlockton*	DT, DE	Los Angeles Raiders	Pro Bowl (1994, 1995, 1996, 1997)
1992	2	38	Levon Kirkland*	LB	Pittsburgh Steelers	Pro Bowl (1996, 1997)
1992	5	117	Curtis Whitley	C	San Diego Chargers	—
1992	5	125	Ed McDaniel*	LB	Minnesota Vikings	Pro Bowl (1998)
1993	1	15	Wayne Simmons^{†}	LB	Green Bay Packers	Super Bowl Champion (XXXI)
1993	3	72	James Trapp^{†}	DB, WR	Los Angeles Raiders	Super Bowl Champion (XXXV)
1993	4	91	Rudy Harris	RB	Tampa Bay Buccaneers	—
1993	4	106	Ashley Sheppard	LB	Minnesota Vikings	—
1993	6	164	Robert O'Neal	DB	Miami Dolphins	—
1994	2	50	Brentson Buckner	DT, DE, NT	Pittsburgh Steelers	—
1994	7	203	Andre Hewitt	T	Cleveland Browns	—
1995	6	179	Wardell Rouse	LB	Tampa Bay Buccaneers	—
1996	2	50	Patrick Sapp	LB	San Diego Chargers	—
1996	2	61	Brian Dawkins*‡	DB	Philadelphia Eagles	Pro Bowl (1999, 2001, 2002, 2004, 2005, 2006, 2008, 2009, 2011); Pro Football Hall of Fame (2018)
1996	5	138	Leomont Evans	DB	Washington Redskins	—
1997	1	28	Trevor Pryce^{*†}	DT, DE	Denver Broncos	Pro Bowl (1999, 2000, 2001, 2002); Super Bowl Champion (XXXII, XXXIII)
1997	2	40	Dexter McCleon^{†}	DB	St. Louis Rams	Super Bowl Champion (XXXIV)
1998	1	15	Anthony Simmons	LB	Seattle Seahawks	—
1998	4	102	Lorenzo Bromell	DE	Miami Dolphins	—
1998	5	129	Raymond Priester	RB	St. Louis Rams	—
1998	6	159	Glenn Roundtree	G	St. Louis Rams	—
1998	7	210	Jim Bundren	G	Miami Dolphins	—
1999	1	25	Antuan Edwards	DB	Green Bay Packers	—
1999	2	45	Rahim Abdullah	LB	Cleveland Browns	—
1999	5	139	Adrian Dingle	DE	San Diego Chargers	—
1999	5	169	Chris Jones	LB	Minnesota Vikings	—
1999	7	231	O. J. Childress	LB	New York Giants	—
1999	7	249	Donald Broomfield	DT	Cincinnati Bengals	—
2001	1	15	Rod Gardner	WR	Washington Redskins	—
2001	7	232	Keith Adams	LB	Tennessee Titans	—
2001	7	244	Robert Carswell	DB	San Diego Chargers	—
2003	4	114	Nick Eason^{†}	DT	Denver Broncos	Super Bowl Champion (XLIII)
2003	4	128	Bryant McNeal	DE	Denver Broncos	—
2004	3	72	Donnell Washington	DT	Green Bay Packers	—
2004	3	77	Derrick Hamilton	WR	San Francisco 49ers	—
2005	2	57	Justin Miller*	DB	New York Jets	Pro Bowl (2006)
2005	3	98	Leroy Hill	LB	Seattle Seahawks	—
2005	5	140	Airese Currie	WR	Chicago Bears	—
2006	1	15	Tye Hill	DB	St. Louis Rams	—
2006	3	81	Charlie Whitehurst	QB	San Diego Chargers	—
2006	7	241	Charles Bennett	LB	Tampa Bay Buccaneers	—
2007	1	4	Gaines Adams	DE	Tampa Bay Buccaneers	—
2007	3	96	Anthony Waters^{†}	LB	San Diego Chargers	Super Bowl Champion (XLIV)
2007	5	139	Dustin Fry	C	St. Louis Rams	—
2007	5	159	C. J. Gaddis	DB	Philadelphia Eagles	—
2007	7	235	Chansi Stuckey	WR	New York Jets	—
2008	2	32	Phillip Merling	DE	Miami Dolphins	—
2008	6	170	Barry Richardson	T	Kansas City Chiefs	—
2009	4	103	Darell Scott	DT	St. Louis Rams	—
2009	5	165	Chris Clemons	DB	Miami Dolphins	—
2009	5	166	Michael Hamlin	DB	Dallas Cowboys	—
2009	6	195	James Davis	RB	Cleveland Browns	—
2010	1	9	C. J. Spiller*	RB	Buffalo Bills	Pro Bowl (2012)
2010	4	108	Jacoby Ford	WR	Oakland Raiders	—
2010	5	134	Ricky Sapp	DE	Philadelphia Eagles	—
2010	5	164	Crezdon Butler	DB	Pittsburgh Steelers	—
2010	7	240	Kavell Conner	LB	Indianapolis Colts	—
2011	2	41	Jarvis Jenkins	DE	Washington Redskins	—
2011	2	50	Marcus Gilchrist	DB	San Diego Chargers	—
2011	2	51	Da'Quan Bowers	DE	Tampa Bay Buccaneers	—
2011	4	122	Chris Hairston	T	Buffalo Bills	—
2011	4	130	Jamie Harper	RB	Tennessee Titans	—
2011	6	173	Byron Maxwell^{†}	DB	Seattle Seahawks	Super Bowl Champion (XLVIII)
2012	2	38	Andre Branch	DE	Jacksonville Jaguars	—
2012	3	64	Dwayne Allen^{†}	TE	Indianapolis Colts	Super Bowl Champion (LIII)
2012	3	93	Brandon Thompson	DT	Cincinnati Bengals	—
2012	4	115	Coty Sensabaugh	DB	Tennessee Titans	—
2013	1	27	DeAndre Hopkins*	WR	Houston Texans	Pro Bowl (2015), (2017), (2018), (2019), (2020)
2013	4	127	Malliciah Goodman	DE	Atlanta Falcons	—
2013	5	143	Jonathan Meeks	DB	Buffalo Bills	—
2013	6	187	Andre Ellington	RB	Arizona Cardinals	—
2014	1	4	Sammy Watkins^{†}	WR	Buffalo Bills	Super Bowl Champion (LIV)
2014	3	100	Brandon Thomas	G	San Francisco 49ers	—
2014	4	102	Bashaud Breeland^{†}	DB	Washington Redskins	Super Bowl Champion (LIV)
2014	4	118	Martavis Bryant	WR	Pittsburgh Steelers	—
2014	6	213	Tajh Boyd	QB	New York Jets	—
2015	1	8	Vic Beasley*	DE	Atlanta Falcons	Pro Bowl (2016)
2015	1	31	Stephone Anthony	LB	New Orleans Saints	—
2015	5	137	Grady Jarrett*	NT	Atlanta Falcons	Pro Bowl (2019), (2020)
2015	5	165	Bradley Pinion^{†}	P	San Francisco 49ers	Super Bowl Champion (LV)
2015	6	188	Tony Steward	LB	Buffalo Bills	—
2016	1	19	Shaq Lawson	DE	Buffalo Bills	—
2016	2	33	Kevin Dodd	DT	Tennessee Titans	—
2016	2	54	Mackensie Alexander	DB	Minnesota Vikings	—
2016	2	57	T. J. Green	S	Indianapolis Colts	—
2016	4	109	B. J. Goodson	LB	New York Giants	—
2016	5	166	D. J. Reader	NT	Houston Texans	—
2016	7	241	Charone Peake	WR	New York Jets	—
2016	7	244	Jayron Kearse	S	Minnesota Vikings	—
2016	7	247	Zac Brooks	RB	Seattle Seahawks	—
2017	1	7	Mike Williams	WR	Los Angeles Chargers	—
2017	1	12	Deshaun Watson*	QB	Houston Texans	Pro Bowl (2018), (2019), (2020)
2017	3	97	Cordrea Tankersley	DB	Miami Dolphins	—
2017	4	140	Wayne Gallman	RB	New York Giants	—
2017	4	142	Carlos Watkins	DT	Houston Texans	—
2017	5	150	Jordan Leggett	TE	New York Jets	—
2018	3	100	Dorian O'Daniel^{†}	LB	Kansas City Chiefs	Super Bowl Champion (LIV)
2018	6	185	Deon Cain	WR	Indianapolis Colts	—
2018	6	187	Ray-Ray McCloud	WR	Buffalo Bills	—
2019	1	4	Clelin Ferrell	DE	Oakland Raiders	—
2019	1	13	Christian Wilkins	DT	Miami Dolphins	—
2019	1	17	Dexter Lawrence*	DT	New York Giants	Pro Bowl (2022), (2023), (2024)
2019	2	40	Trayvon Mullen	DB	Oakland Raiders	—
2019	4	117	Austin Bryant	DE	Detroit Lions	—
2019	5	149	Hunter Renfrow*	WR	Oakland Raiders	Pro Bowl (2021)
2020	1	8	Isaiah Simmons	LB	Arizona Cardinals	—
2020	1	16	A. J. Terrell	DB	Atlanta Falcons	—
2020	2	33	Tee Higgins	WR	Cincinnati Bengals	Pro Bowl (2025)
2020	3	100	Tanner Muse	LB	Las Vegas Raiders	—
2020	4	109	John Simpson	G	Las Vegas Raiders	—
2020	4	127	K'Von Wallace	S	Philadelphia Eagles	—
2020	7	250	Tremayne Anchrum^{†}	G	Los Angeles Rams	Super Bowl Champion (LVI)
2021	1	1	Trevor Lawrence*	QB	Jacksonville Jaguars	Pro Bowl (2022)
2021	1	25	Travis Etienne	RB	Jacksonville Jaguars	—
2021	2	46	Jackson Carman	G	Cincinnati Bengals	—
2021	3	85	Amari Rodgers	WR	Green Bay Packers	—
2021	5	181	Cornell Powell	WR	Kansas City Chiefs	—
2022	2	42	Andrew Booth Jr.	DB	Minnesota Vikings	—
2022	7	231	Baylon Spector	LB	Buffalo Bills	—
2023	1	28	Myles Murphy	DE	Cincinnati Bengals	—
2023	1	29	Bryan Bresee	DT	New Orleans Saints	—
2023	3	86	Trenton Simpson	LB	Baltimore Ravens	—
2023	5	137	KJ Henry	DE	Washington Commanders	—
2023	5	156	Jordan McFadden	G	Los Angeles Chargers	—
2023	5	175	Davis Allen	TE	Los Angeles Rams	—
2024	1	30	Nate Wiggins	DB	Baltimore Ravens	—
2024	2	35	Ruke Orhorhoro	DT	Atlanta Falcons	—
2024	4	127	Will Shipley^{†}	RB	Philadelphia Eagles	Super Bowl Champion (LIX)
2024	5	138	Xavier Thomas	DE	Arizona Cardinals	—
2024	5	155	Jeremiah Trotter Jr.^{†}	LB	Philadelphia Eagles	Super Bowl Champion (LIX)
2024	6	196	Tyler Davis	DT	Los Angeles Rams	—
2025	4	119	Barrett Carter	LB	Cincinnati Bengals	—
2025	6	214	R. J. Mickens	S	Los Angeles Chargers	—
2025	7	239	Phil Mafah	RB	Dallas Cowboys	—
2026	1	17	Blake Miller	T	Detroit Lions	—
2026	1	29	Peter Woods	DT	Kansas City Chiefs	—
2026	2	35	T. J. Parker	DE	Buffalo Bills	—
2026	2	48	Avieon Terrell	DB	Atlanta Falcons	—
2026	3	71	Antonio Williams	WR	Washington Commanders	—
2026	4	110	Cade Klubnik	QB	New York Jets	—
2026	4	123	Wade Woodaz	LB	Houston Texans	—
2026	5	155	DeMonte Capehart	DT	Tampa Bay Buccaneers	—
2026	5	174	Adam Randall	RB	Baltimore Ravens	—

== Notable undrafted players ==
Note: No drafts held before 1920

Year	Player	Debut Team	Position	Notes
1966	Bob Baldwin	FB	Baltimore Colts	—
1974	Marion Reeves	DB	Philadelphia Eagles	—
1979	Al Latimer	DB	Philadelphia Eagles	—
1980	Jeff Bostic	C	Washington Redskins	—
1980	Steve Kenney	G	Philadelphia Eagles	—
1983	Dan Benish	DT	Atlanta Falcons	—
1984	Billy Davis	LB	Denver Broncos	—
1989	James Coley	TE	Chicago Bears	—
2001	Terry Witherspoon	FB	Dallas Cowboys	—
2002	Woodrow Dantzler	DB	Dallas Cowboys	—
2015	Adam Humphries	WR	Tennessee Titans	—
2022	Naz Bohannon	TE	Jacksonville Jaguars	—
2022	Mario Goodrich	DB	Philadelphia Eagles	—
2022	Justyn Ross	WR	Kansas City Chiefs	—
2022	James Skalski	LB	Indianapolis Colts	—
2022	Nolan Turner	S	Tampa Bay Buccaneers	—
2023	Joseph Ngata	WR	Philadelphia Eagles	—
2023	B. T. Potter	PK	Pittsburgh Steelers	—
2024	Will Putnam	C	Las Vegas Raiders	—
2025	Jake Briningstool	TE	Kansas City Chiefs	—
2025	Payton Page	DT	New York Jets	—
2025	Marcus Tate	OL	Philadelphia Eagles	—
