= Ermal Allen =

American football player and coach (1918–1988)

- Allen during his basketball career at Kentucky

No. 66
- Position: Quarterback

Personal information
- Born: December 25, 1918; Kyles Ford, Tennessee, U.S.
- Died: February 9, 1988 (aged 69); Dallas, Texas, U.S.
- Listed height: 5 ft 11 in (1.80 m)
- Listed weight: 165 lb (75 kg)

Career information
- High school: Morristown (Morristown, Tennessee)
- College: Kentucky (1938-1941)
- NFL draft: 1947: 3rd round, 18th overall pick

Career history

Playing
- Cleveland Browns (1947)

Coaching
- Kentucky (1948–1953) Offensive coordinator; Kentucky (1954–1961) Defensive coordinator; Dallas Cowboys (1962–1969) Quarterbacks / running backs coach; Dallas Cowboys (1970–1983) Research and development

Awards and highlights
- As player: AAFC champion (1947); As coach: 2× Super Bowl champion (VI, XII)

Career AAFC statistics
- Passing yards: 88
- Passer rating: 55.9
- Defensive interceptions: 4
- Stats at Pro Football Reference

Ermal Glenn Allen (December 25, 1918 – February 9, 1988) was an American professional football quarterback and assistant coach. He grew up in Tennessee and attended the University of Kentucky, where he played basketball, track, golf, and football. After four years in the U.S. Army during World War II, Allen was drafted in 1947 by the Chicago Cardinals of the National Football League (NFL). He instead went to play for the Cleveland Browns of the competing All-America Football Conference, who won the league championship that year.

Allen played in Cleveland for one season, returning to the University of Kentucky in 1948 to serve as an assistant football coach under Bear Bryant. He stayed at Kentucky after Blanton Collier took over as head coach in 1954, working as the team's defensive coordinator. In 1962, Tom Landry hired him as a backfield coach on the NFL's Dallas Cowboys. He became the head of the Cowboys' research and development department in 1970 and was charged with scouting opponents. Allen won Super Bowl VI and Super Bowl XII with the Cowboys and remained with the team until retiring in 1983. He died of cancer in a Dallas hospital in 1988.

== Early life and college ==
Allen grew up in Morristown, Tennessee and was a star athlete at Morristown High School. He attended the University of Kentucky, where he played football, basketball, track and golf. He was on the varsity football team between 1939 and 1941, playing as a tailback under head coach A. D. Kirwan. The team finished with winning records in each of the seasons Allen played, but was not ranked in the AP Poll of the best college teams in the country. Allen was a triple threat man, handling passing, running and kicking duties for Kentucky.

Allen was a member of a Kentucky golf team that lost only one match in 1940 and went undefeated in 1941 and 1942. He played varsity basketball between 1940 and 1942, earning a spot on the Southeastern Conference all-star team in his final year. Allen's college career was interrupted by service in the U.S. Army during World War II. He enlisted in 1942 and spent four years in the Army, rising to the rank of major.

Allen returned to the University of Kentucky to finish his education and play a final year of football. A controversy developed, however, over his eligibility to play in 1946 because he had already played three varsity seasons before enlisting. Southeastern Conference commissioner Mike Conner ruled him ineligible in September, shortly after he had been certified to play based on a rule that gave four years of varsity eligibility to men who served in the war. Several days later, he was again ruled eligible by the conference's executive committee. Kentucky head coach Bear Bryant said he was "delighted" with the decision. After quarterbacking Kentucky to victories over the University of Mississippi and University of Cincinnati, the conference reversed its decision and declared him ineligible. He spent the rest of the year coaching backs under Bryant.

== Professional football career ==
Allen was drafted in the third round by the Chicago Cardinals of the National Football League (NFL) in 1947 but instead joined the Cleveland Browns of the competing All-America Football Conference (AAFC). He competed to be a backup for starting quarterback Otto Graham in the team's T formation offense. Allen struggled to learn Cleveland's formations, which differed significantly from the single-wing formation his Kentucky teams used. Allen had four completions in limited playing time for Cleveland as the team finished the season with the 12–1–1 record and beat the New York Yankees in the championship game.

== Coaching career ==
Allen returned to the University of Kentucky in 1948 and was named the football team's offensive coordinator under Bryant. Blanton Collier, who had been a backfield coach for the Browns, succeeded Bryant as Kentucky head coach in 1954. Collier kept Allen on his staff but switched him to defensive coordinator. Allen remained an avid golfer as he continued his coaching career, winning the Kentucky Amateur Golf Championship in 1955 and 1958. He came in second place in the tournament in 1956 and tied for first place in a tri-state championship.

Allen left Kentucky in 1962 to become a backfield coach for the NFL's Dallas Cowboys under head coach Tom Landry. In 1970, he became a special assistant to Landry and headed the Cowboys' research and development department. In that role, he was responsible for scouting all of the Cowboys' opponents. The Cowboys won Super Bowl VI in 1972 while Allen was with the team. Allen suffered a heart attack before the 1973 season, but remained with the team until 1983.

== Death ==
Allen died of cancer in 1988 at the Presbyterian Hospital of Dallas. "He was a tremendous coach, as well as a real bright type of guy who had a statistical mind," Landry said after his death. "He could keep up with anything." Landry also praised his sense of humor. Eugene Meeks, who played college football with Allen, said he was one of Kentucky's best-ever athletes and a dominant golf player during his time at the university.
