= Morristown-Hamblen High School West =

Coordinates: 36.2000°N 83.2975°W

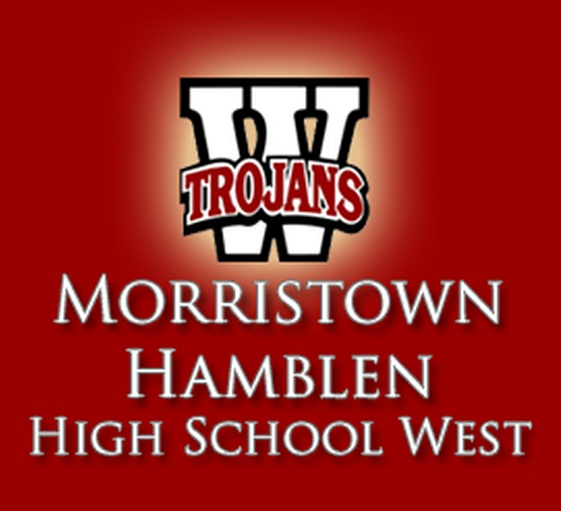

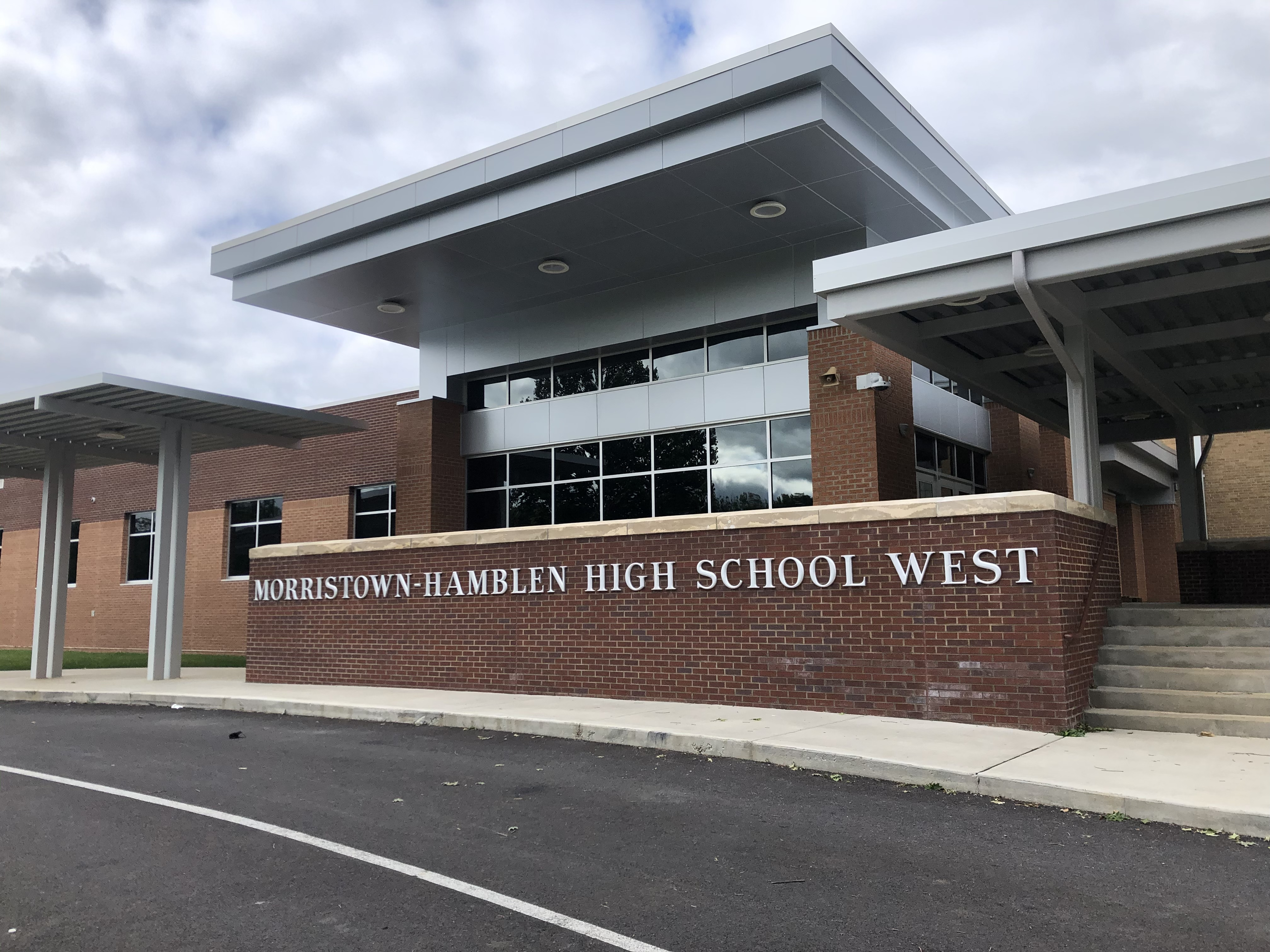
- Front of Morristown West High School in May 2021

Location
- One Trojan Trail; Morristown, Hamblen, Tennessee 37813

Information
- School type: High school
- Motto: Where Champions Are Made
- Founded: 1968
- School board: Hamblen County Board of Education
- Principal: Jeff Kinsler
- Teaching staff: 93.67 (FTE)
- Grades: 9 - 12
- Enrollment: 1,499 (2023-2024)
- Student to teacher ratio: 16.00
- Language: English
- Colours: Crimson & White
- Mascot: Trojan
- Team name: Trojans, Lady Trojans, Chestnut Tree
- Accreditation: Southern Association of Colleges and Schools
- ACT average: 20.2
- Website: wh.hcboe.net

Morristown-Hamblen High School West (also known as Morristown West High School) is a secondary school located in Morristown, Tennessee. The school incorporates grades 9–12. The mascot is the Trojan. The school colors are crimson and white. As of the 2021-2022 school year, 1,489 students were enrolled.

== History ==
Morristown-Hamblen High School West opened as a new school of the Morristown City School System in September 1968, with an enrollment of 1,050 students. The building was constructed on a 33-acre site at a cost of approximately three million dollars. Morristown students who lived west of Cumberland Avenue were eligible to enroll in the school. The school's name was suggested by the Hamblen County School Board and was approved by the Morristown City School Commission. With the new high school, Morristown High School changed its name to Morristown-Hamblen High School East. Prior to the opening of the school, a committee composed of the superintendent, board members, and students selected "Trojans" as the nickname and crimson and white as the school colors. In April 1970, a visiting committee sponsored by the Southern Association of Colleges and Schools evaluated the school to determine its eligibility for accreditation by that organization.

The school was accepted as a member of the Southern Association of Colleges and Schools in the fall of 1970 and has kept its high standing in the association to the present. Morristown-Hamblen High School West became part of the Hamblen County School System in January 1986. The Hamblen County Board of Education started an extensive building program in 1989. Sixteen classrooms, including a special education wing, a science laboratory, a new agriculture shop, an assistant principal's office, and a computer lab, were added. The auditorium was also remodeled at this time.

The school constructed a weight room with dressing facilities and a new surface for the outdoor track in 1990. Additionally, they installed new heating and cooling systems throughout the building in 1997. The faculty, parents, and community continue to support the growth and improvement of the school programs, as shown by their contributions toward the creation of a state-of-the-art exercise room with superior equipment and the construction of a new baseball and softball field and stadium. Other improvements have included library scanning and security systems, a new parking lot, a new greenhouse, and auditorium equipment. Replacement desks in classrooms have been provided, along with the updating or replacement of new computers in the library and computer labs.

Recent improvements include new tile in the library, classrooms, and primary office. Two roof units have been installed to vent fresh air into seventeen interior classrooms. A new agriculture classroom and horticulture potting room were constructed. A new curtain was bought for the auditorium, and the fence was replaced along the front of the school. The new cafeteria tables with the school logo are the newest additions to the school.

Hamblen County continues to grow westward, and as a result, Morristown-Hamblen High School West's enrollment has increased in recent years. Future facility improvements and enlargements are being investigated, as is the addition of personnel. Plans are being drawn for a major renovation and redesign project for the school.

== Sports ==
Sports offered at Morristown West High School are baseball, basketball (men & women's), cheerleading, cross country, American football, golf, soccer (men & women's), softball, swimming, tennis, track, volleyball, and wrestling.

- Women's Soccer: 2010 Conference Champions
- Women's Basketball: On March 11, 2010, the Morristown West High School Lady Trojans team competed for the TSSAA Class AAA 2010 Girls Basketball State Championship and were able to advance to the finals. On March 13, the Lady Trojans lost the finals to Riverdale High School with a score of 59 to 42. Lady Trojans basketball team won State Runner Up with a record of 34-2 all season, the farthest any Morristown West Lady basketball team has ever gone. Taylor Hall, a senior basketball player, was announced as the Division I, Class AAA Miss Basketball Award Winner.
- Wrestling: Prep Extra champions in 2010. Champions of the 2011 Battle of Morristown Tournament In its existence, the squad has produced two individual state champions.
- Varsity Cheerleaders: On April 13, 2010, the Morristown West High varsity cheerleaders won first place in the state at the AAA Girl's State Basketball Tournament held in Murfreesboro, Tennessee.
- Men's Basketball: 2018-2019 Season West High was co-champions of the IMAC, tied with Morristown East. The season saw the Trojans win the most games in basketball since the 1990s. This team, consisting of nine seniors, two Juniors, and a sophomore, won the Innisfree Hotels Basketball Tournament in Pensacola, Florida.

== Notable alumni ==
- Darrius Blevins — retired NFL player
- James Stewart — retired NFL player
