= Darrius Blevins =

American football player (born 1976)

No. 83
- Positions: Wide receiver, return specialist

Personal information
- Born: April 21, 1976 (age 50); Morristown, Tennessee, U.S.
- Listed height: 6 ft 2 in (1.88 m)
- Listed weight: 216 lb (98 kg)

Career information
- High school: Morristown-Hamblen West
- College: Memphis
- NFL draft: 1999: undrafted

Career history
- St. Louis Rams (1999-2000)

Awards and highlights
- Super Bowl champion (XXXIV)

Career NFL statistics
- Return yards: 173
- Stats at Pro Football Reference

Darrius L. Blevins (born April 21, 1976) is an American former professional football player who was a wide receiver and return specialist for the St. Louis Rams of the National Football League (NFL). He was signed by the Rams as an undrafted free agent in 1999. He played college football for the Memphis Tigers.

== Early life and college ==
Darrius Blevins was born on April 21, 1976, in Morristown, Tennessee. He played high school football at Morristown-Hamblen High School West from 1991 to 1994. He attended the University of Memphis and played for the Memphis Tigers from 1994 to 1998. He graduated with a bachelor's degree.

== Professional career ==
Blevins was signed by the St. Louis Rams in 1999 as an undrafted free agent. He didn't appear in any games for 1999 season, however the Rams won Super Bowl XXXIV by beating the Tennessee Titans 23–16.

Blevins was promoted to the active roster for the 2000 season and appeared in five games. He played in weeks 12-16 primarily as a kick returner, returning nine kicks for 173 yards and no touchdowns. He also logged a single tackle on special teams. The Rams went 10-6 and made the playoffs, losing to the New Orleans Saints 31–28 in the Wild Card round.

Prior to the 2001 season, Blevins was injured and placed on injury reserve. He retired soon after.

== See also ==
- 2000 St. Louis Rams season
