= Rick Harrell =

American football player (born 1951)

No. 54
- Position: Center

Personal information
- Born: August 8, 1951 (age 75); Morristown, Tennessee, U.S.
- Listed height: 6 ft 3 in (1.91 m)
- Listed weight: 238 lb (108 kg)

Career information
- High school: East (Morristown)
- College: Clemson (1969–1972)
- NFL draft: 1973: 6th round, 155th overall pick

Career history
- New York Jets (1973)
- Stats at Pro Football Reference

Richard Lee Harrell (born August 8, 1951) is an American former professional football player who was a center for one season with the New York Jets of the National Football League (NFL). He played college football for the Clemson Tigers.

== Early life and college ==
Richard Lee Harrell was born on August 8, 1951, in Morristown, Tennessee. He attended Morristown-Hamblen High School East in Morristown.

Harrell was a member of the Clemson Tigers from 1969 to 1972 and a three-year letterman from 1970 to 1972. He played in the Blue–Gray Football Classic after his senior year.

== Professional career ==
Harrell was selected by the New York Jets in the sixth round, with the 155th overall pick, of the 1973 NFL draft. He was released on August 29 and signed to the team's taxi squad on September 13. He was later promoted to the active roster and played in four games for the Jets during the 1973 season. Harrell was cut by the team in mid August 1974.
