= Davis Allen =

Davis Allen may refer to:

- Davis Allen (designer) (1916–1999), American designer
- Davis Allen (American football) (born 2001), American football player
