= Morristown-Hamblen High School East =

Coordinates: 36.2136°N 83.2858°W

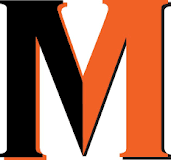

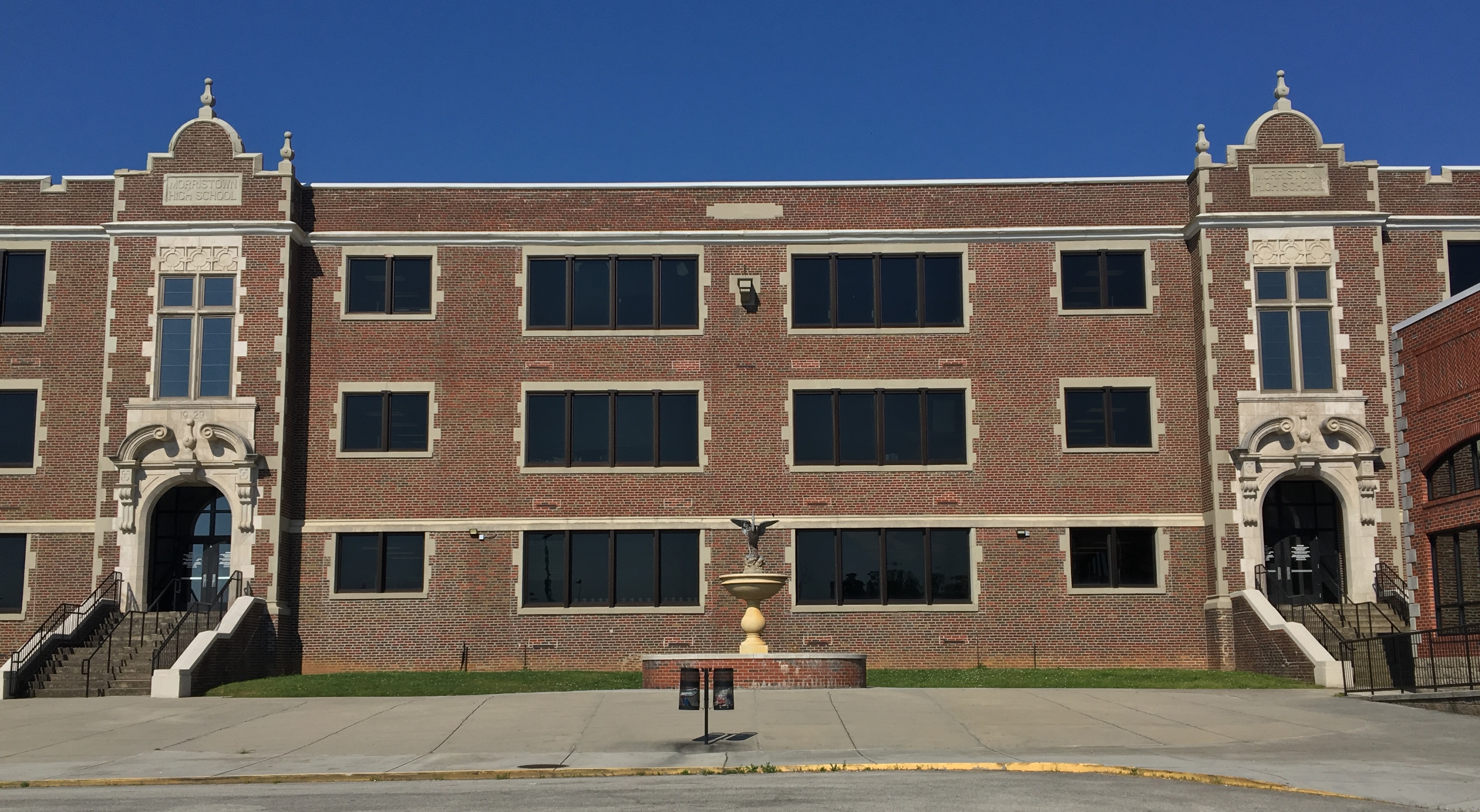
- Front of Morristown East High School in May 2020

Location
- One Hurricane Lane; Morristown, Hamblen, Tennessee 37813

Information
- School type: High school
- Motto: "Where Traditions Begin"
- Founded: 1923
- School board: Hamblen County Board of Education
- Principal: Randall Greene
- Staff: 91.00 (FTE)
- Grades: 9–12
- Enrollment: 1,572 (2022–23)
- Student to teacher ratio: 19.62
- Language: English
- Colors: Orange and Black
- Mascot: "Storm" the Ibis
- Team name: Hurricanes, Lady Hurricanes
- Accreditation: Southern Association of Colleges and Schools
- ACT average: 19.1
- Website: eh.hcboe.net

Morristown-Hamblen High School East (also known as Morristown East High School and formerly known as Morristown High School) is a secondary school located in Morristown, Tennessee. MHHSE is the oldest accredited high school in the state of Tennessee. The school incorporates grades 9–12. The school mascot is "Storm" the Ibis, students and faculty are known as the Hurricanes and the school colors are orange and black. The school had an enrollment of around 1,572 students as of the 2022-2023 school year. Randall Greene is the head principal.

== History ==
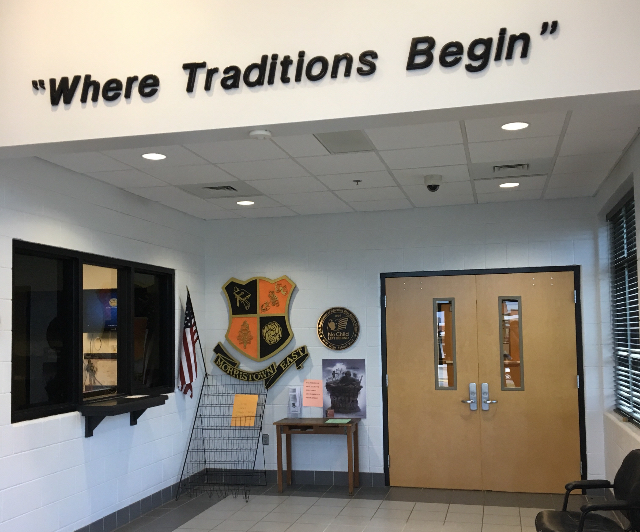
Morristown-Hamblen High School East entrance

Morristown High School was built in 1923 and was admitted to the Southern Association of Colleges and Schools. Isenberg-Siler Gymnasium was added in 1954 and the third floor was added in 1955. The south wing was added in 1968. A major renovation occurred in 1989 at a cost of 8.9 million dollars. A 1.3 million dollar library was opened in 2004 and was named in memory of Dr. Joe E. Gibson, Sr., a former School Board Member and East High supporter. A multimillion-dollar school-wide renovation/remodel occurred between 2010 and 2012. This included the addition of a new administrative wing, a new cafeteria, Freshman Academy, STEM (science, technology, engineering, mathematics) Academy, and Health Wing.

The school changed names in 1968 and has been known as Morristown-Hamblen High School East since that time due to the new high school, Morristown-Hamblen High School West for students who lived west of Morristown. The building is of traditional style and is located half a mile from the center of downtown Morristown. Morristown High School was known originally as the Golden Hurricanes but the name has been changed to the Hurricanes. The symbol used in earlier years was a tornado. However, the new logo is that of a hurricane, created for MHHSE by a design artist from New Jersey.

The main building at Morristown East has dozens of classrooms, a cafeteria, an auditorium, a gymnasium, STEM Academy, Freshman Academy, Health and Wellness Center, and a library.

In 2019, Principal Gary Johnson retired after holding the position of principal for 29 years.

== Awards and recognitions ==
- 1969 AAA Football State Champions
- 2000 – Scholar Bowl, Won East TN PBS Regional
- 2005 – No Child Left Behind, Blue Ribbon School
- 2008, 2009, & 2010 – U.S. News & World Report, Bronze Medal School

== Sports ==
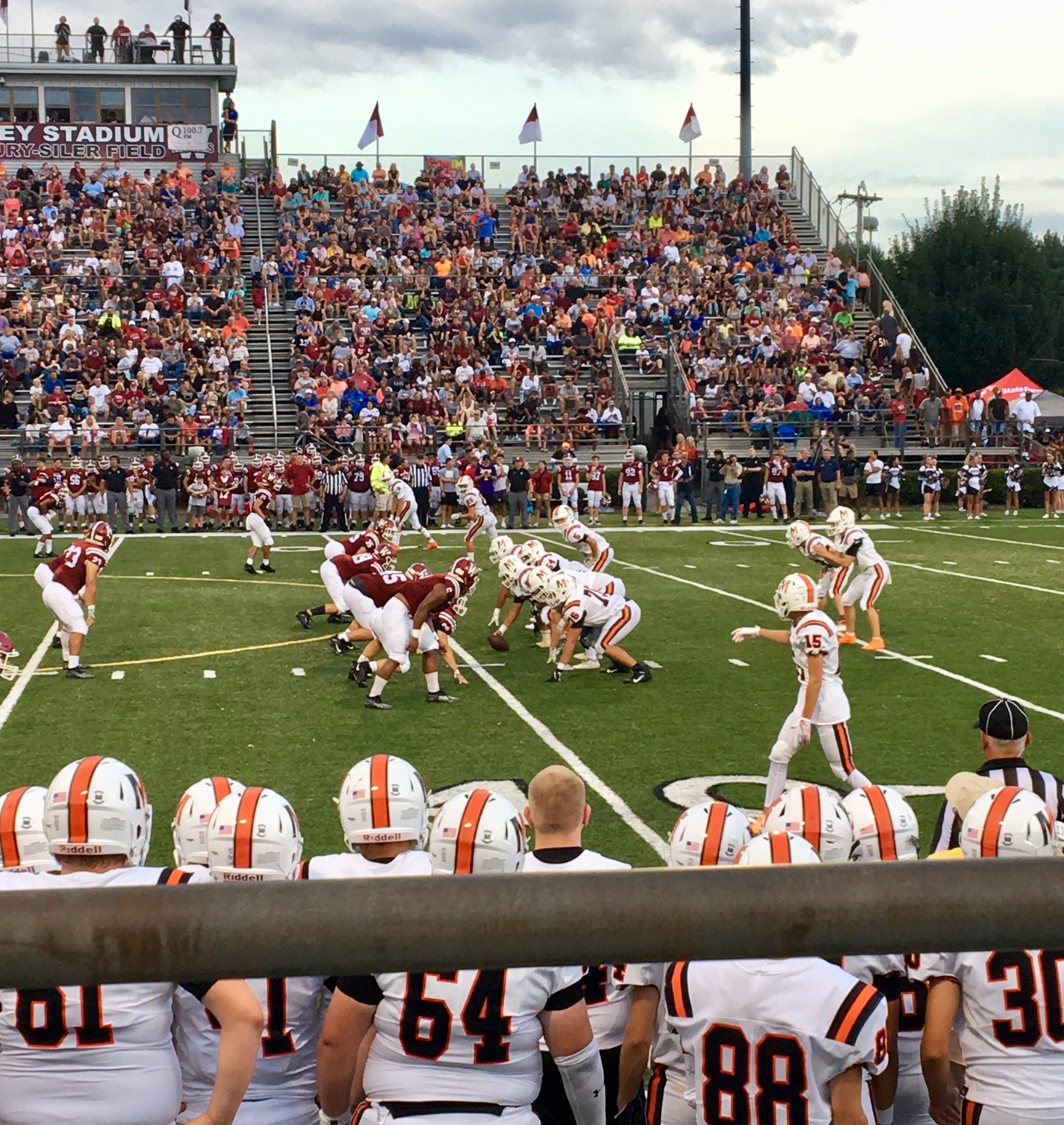
The 2019 East vs. West football game at Burke-Toney Stadium.

Sports offered at Morristown East High School include baseball, men and women's basketball, cheerleading, cross country, American football, golf, men and women's soccer, softball, swimming, tennis, track, volleyball, and wrestling.

=== Burke-Toney Stadium ===
Burke-Toney Stadium, located on the grounds of Morristown East High, is used for home football games for both East and West. The schools alternate the home title each year when they play each other. The East vs. West football game is usually the most attended game of the year. The stadium is also used for soccer and band practice. East has won a total of 41,584 games since the school has opened.

== Notable alumni ==
- Ermal Allen — NFL football player and coach; Super Bowl winner
- Arnold W. Bunch Jr. — U.S. Air Force four-star general and current commander of Air Force Materiel Command
- Amy Greene — novelist and contributor to The New York Times
- Brett Martin — MLB pitcher
- Randy Sanders — head football coach for East Tennessee State
- Jane Wagner — playwright and actress who wrote The Search for Signs of Intelligent Life in the Universe
