= 1984 Virginia Cavaliers football team =

American college football season

1984 Virginia Cavaliers football

Peach Bowl champion

Peach Bowl, W 27–24 vs. Purdue
- Conference: Atlantic Coast Conference

Ranking
- AP: No. 20
- Record: 8–2–2 (3–1–2 ACC)
- Head coach: George Welsh (3rd season)
- Captains: Tom Kilgannon; Lester Lyles; Bob Olderman
- Home stadium: Scott Stadium

1984 Atlantic Coast Conference football standings
	Conf.					Overall
Team	W		L		T	W		L		T
No. 12 Maryland $	5	–	0	–	0	9	–	3	–	0
No. 20 Virginia	3	–	1	–	2	8	–	2	–	2
North Carolina	3	–	2	–	1	5	–	5	–	1
Wake Forest	3	–	3	–	0	6	–	5	–	0
Georgia Tech	2	–	2	–	1	6	–	4	–	1
NC State	1	–	5	–	0	3	–	8	–	0
Duke	1	–	5	–	0	2	–	9	–	0
Clemson	0	–	0	–	0*	7	–	4	–	0
$ – Conference champion; * – Clemson was under NCAA and ACC probation and was ineligible for the ACC title. As a result, their ACC games did not count in the league standings.; Rankings from AP Poll

The 1984 Virginia Cavaliers football team represented the University of Virginia during the 1984 NCAA Division I-A football season. The Cavaliers were led by third-year head coach George Welsh and played their home games at Scott Stadium in Charlottesville, Virginia. They competed as members of the Atlantic Coast Conference, finishing in second.

The season was a historically successful one for Virginia. The school made their first appearance in the AP Poll in over 30 years when they entered at number 19 in week 11. Finishing the regular season with a 7–2–2 record, they were invited to Virginia's first ever bowl game, the 1984 Peach Bowl, where they defeated Purdue. They were ranked in the final AP Poll for the second time in school history and the first time since 1951, coming in at 20th.

== Schedule ==
Date	Time	Opponent	Rank	Site	TV	Result	Attendance	Source
September 8	7:00 p.m.	No. 3 Clemson*^{A}		Scott Stadium; Charlottesville, VA		L 0–55	38,676	
September 15	7:00 p.m.	VMI*		Scott Stadium; Charlottesville, VA		W 35–7	28,997	
September 22	2:00 p.m.	at Navy*		Navy–Marine Corps Memorial Stadium; Annapolis, MD		W 21–9	29,349	
September 29	1:30 p.m.	at Virginia Tech*		Lane Stadium; Blacksburg, VA (rivalry)		W 26–23	50,600	
October 6	7:00 p.m.	at Duke		Wallace Wade Stadium; Durham, NC		W 38–10	17,200	
October 13	7:00 p.m.	No. 20 Georgia Tech		Scott Stadium; Charlottesville, VA		T 20–20	40,067	
October 20	3:50 p.m.	Wake Forest^{†}		Scott Stadium; Charlottesville, VA	ABC	W 28–9	38,671	
November 3	12:20 p.m.	at No. 12 West Virginia*		Mountaineer Field; Morgantown, WV		W 27–7	56,453	
November 10	1:00 p.m.	NC State		Scott Stadium; Charlottesville, VA		W 45–0	43,379	
November 17	1:00 p.m.	at North Carolina	No. 19	Kenan Memorial Stadium; Chapel Hill, NC (South's Oldest Rivalry)		T 24–24	48,000	
November 24	12:15 p.m.	No. 18 Maryland		Scott Stadium; Charlottesville, VA (rivalry)	JPS	L 34–45	43,017	
December 31	3:00 p.m.	vs. Purdue*		Atlanta–Fulton County Stadium; Atlanta, GA (Peach Bowl)	CBS	W 27–24	41,107	
*Non-conference game; ^{†}Homecoming; Rankings from AP Poll released prior to the game; Source: A. Clemson was under NCAA probation, and was ineligible for the ACC title. Therefore this game did not count in the league standings.

== Personnel ==
1984 Virginia Cavaliers football team roster
Players
Coaches
Offense

Pos.	#	Name	Class
OT	73	Jim Dombrowski	Jr
QB	1	Don Majkowski	So
QB	10	Scott Secules	Fr
G	79	Bob Olderman	Sr
RB	4	Barry Word	Jr
WR	84	Geno Zimmerlink	Jr

Defense

Pos.	#	Name	Class
SS	26	Lester Lyles	Sr
DT	97	Rayotis Perkins	So
LB	51	Russ Swan	Jr
NG	90	Scott Urch	So

Special teams

Pos.	#	Name	Class

Head coach

- George Welsh

Coordinators/assistant coaches

Legend

- (C) Team captain
- (S) Suspended
- (I) Ineligible
- Injured
- Redshirt
