= List of North Carolina Tar Heels football All-Americans =

The North Carolina Tar Heels college football team competes as part of the National Collegiate Athletic Association (NCAA) Division I Football Bowl Subdivision (FBS), and represents the University of North Carolina at Chapel Hill in the Coastal Division of the Atlantic Coast Conference (ACC). All-America selections are individual player recognitions made after each season when numerous publications release lists of their ideal team. The NCAA recognizes five All-America lists: the Associated Press (AP), American Football Coaches Association (AFCA), the Football Writers Association of America (FWAA), Sporting News (TSN), and the Walter Camp Football Foundation (WC). In order for an honoree to earn a "consensus" selection, he must be selected as first team in three of the five lists recognized by the NCAA, and "unanimous" selections must be selected as first team in all five lists.

Since the establishment of the team in 1888, North Carolina has had 68 players honored a total of 85 times as an All-American for their performance on the field of play. Included in these selections are fourteen consensus selections, three of which were unanimous selections. The most recent All-Americans from North Carolina a came after the 2013 season, when Eric Ebron and Ryan Switzer were each named First Team All-America by various selectors.

== Key ==
^{†}	Consensus selection
^{‡}	Unanimous selection

B	Back (Note: In American and Canadian football, a back is a player who is lined up behind the linemen, the players who line up closest to the line of scrimmage.)	K	Kicker	NT	Nose tackle
C	Center	LB	Linebacker	FB	Fullback
DB	Defensive back	P	Punter	HB	Halfback
DE	Defensive end	QB	Quarterback	WR	Wide receiver
DT	Defensive tackle	RB	Running back	G	Guard
E	End	T	Tackle	TE	Tight end
PR	Punt Returner	NG	Nose Guard	FS	Free Safety
TB	Tailback				

=== Selectors ===
AAB	All-America Board	AFCA	American Football Coaches Association	AP	Associated Press	APT	All-Players Team
AR	Albert Richard	ATH	Athlon	BCT	Bill Cunningham Team	BST	Bill Stern Team
BOS	Boston Record	CBS	CBSSports.com	CD	Collegiate Digest	CF	Complete Football
CFI	College Football Illustrated (Sports Review)	CH	College Humor	CHPT	Charles Parker Team	CNB	Collyer’s News Bureau
CPFN	College and Pro Football Newsweekly	CNNSI	CNN/Sports Illustrated	CP	Central Press Association	CS	College Sports
CSW	College Sports Writers	DBT	Dr. L.H. Baker Team	DHT	Deke Houlgate Team	EDT	Eddie Dooley Team
FC	Football Coaches	FD	Football Digest	FN	Football News	FWAA	Football Writers Association of America
GR	Gridiron Record	GRCE	Grantland Rice	GW	Gridiron Weekly	HLMS	Helms
HST	Hearst	INS	International News Service	JCT	Jim Crowley Team	JB	Joel Buschbaum
LLT	Lou Little Team	ILA	Illustrated Football Annual	MZLU	Mizlou	NEA	Newspaper Enterprise Association
NSWK	Newsweek	NYN	New York News	NYS	New York Sun	NYWT	New York World-Telegram
PFW	Pro Football Weekly	PG	Police Gazette	PIC	PIC Scouts	PMT	Paramount
PW	Pop Warner	RGT	Red Grange Team	RST	Ray Scott Team	RVLS	Rivals.com
SCT	Scout.com	SH	Scripps-Howard	SLGD	St. Louis Globe-Democrat	SR	Sports Review
SW	Sports Week	Time	Time Magazine	TSN	The Sporting News	TTT	Tom Thorp Team
USA	USA Today	UP	United Press	UPI	United Press International	WC	Walter Camp
WILL	Paul Williamson	WWF	What’s What in Football				

== Selections ==
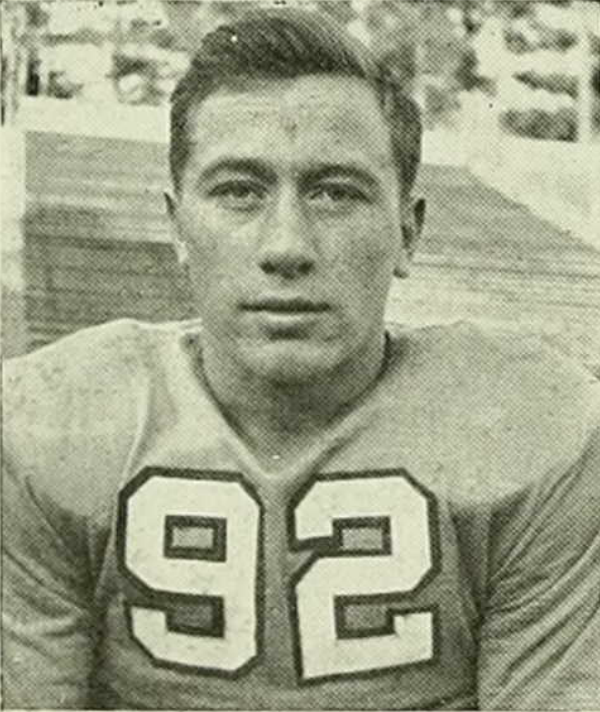
In 1939, George Stirnweiss was an All-American by three different voters.

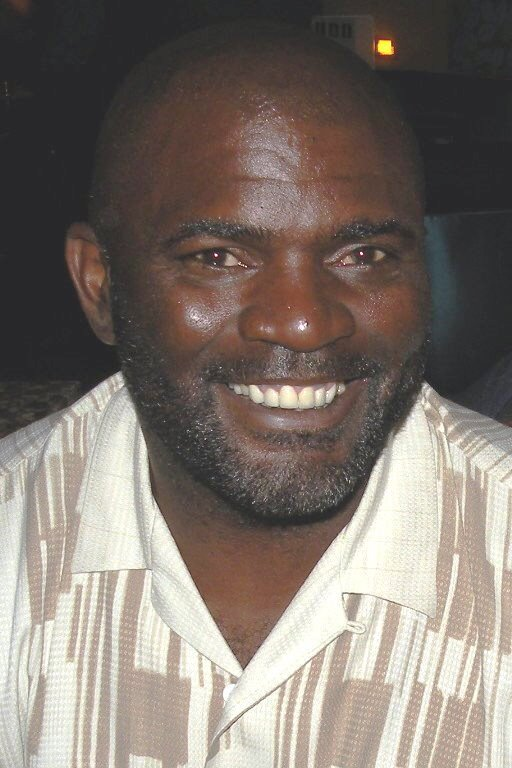
Lawrence Taylor was named a consensus First-team All-American in 1980.

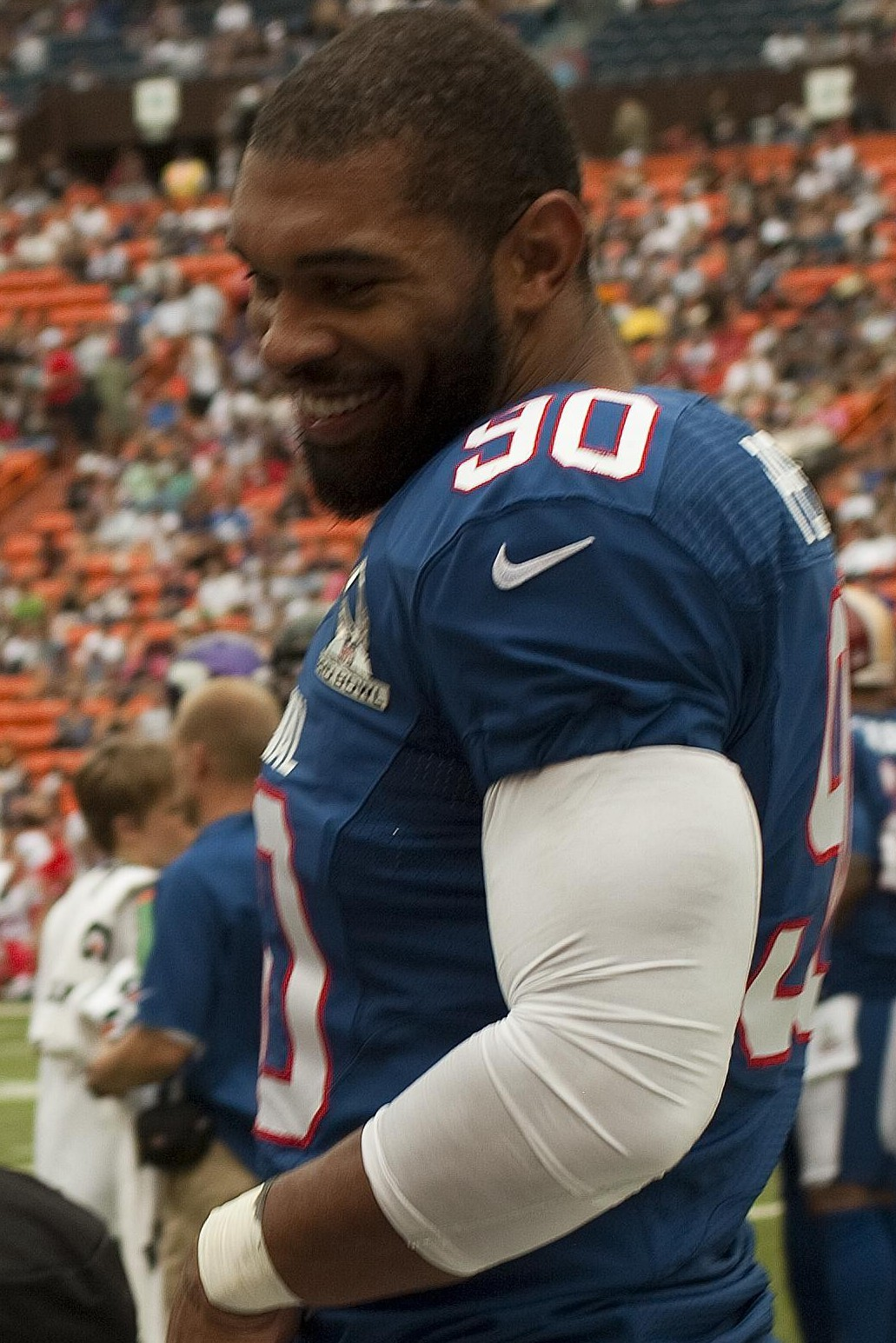
Julius Peppers was a consensus First-team selection in 2001.

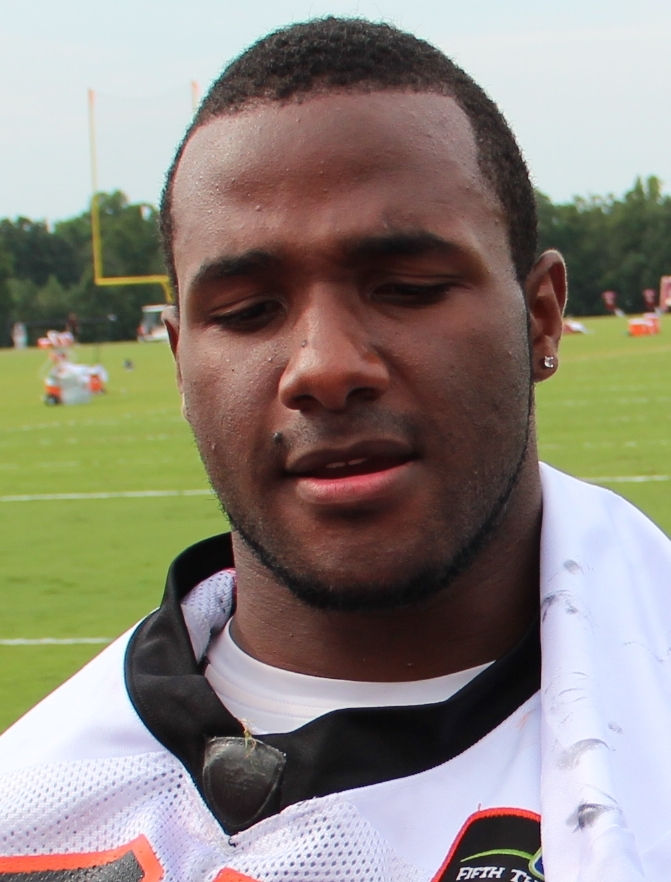
The Associated Press named Giovani Bernard to their third-team in 2012.

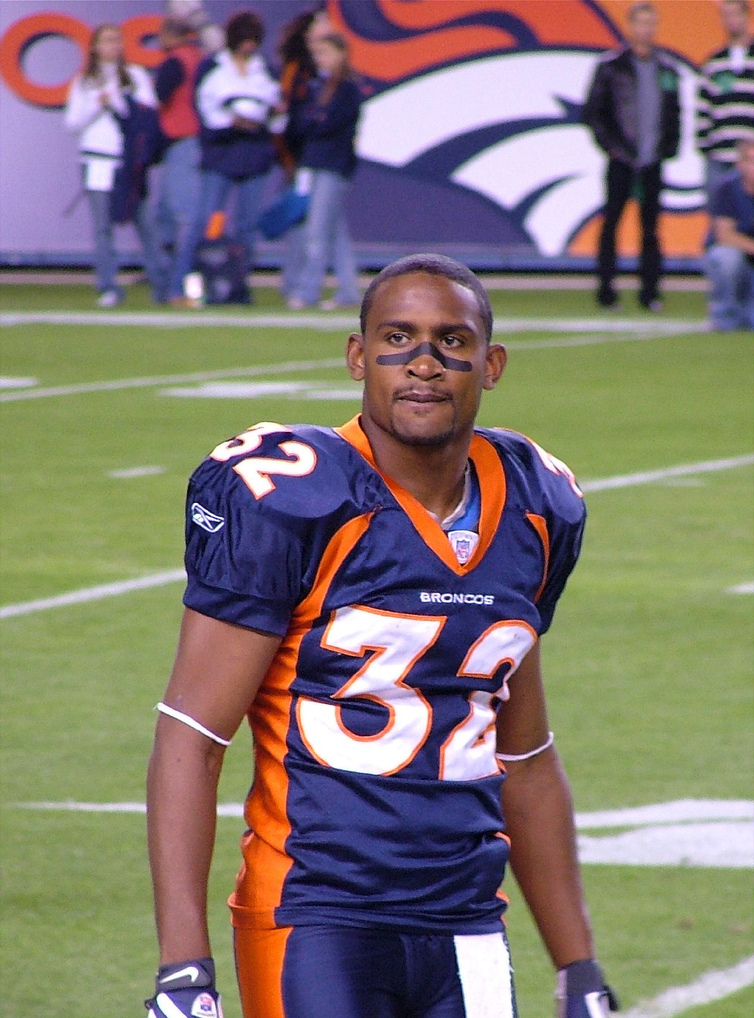
Dré Bly was the first player in ACC history to be named a consensus First-team All-American twice.

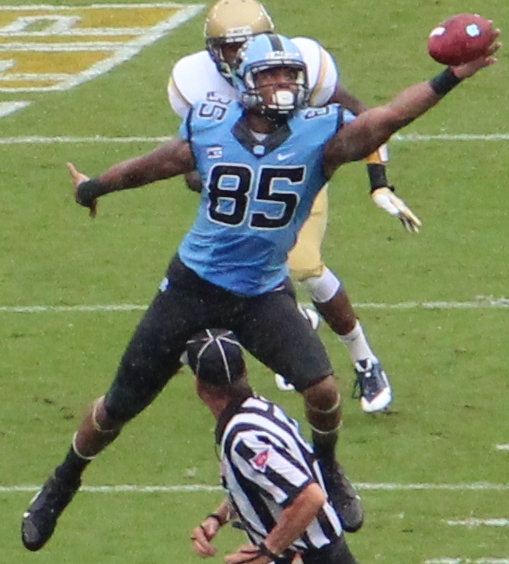
Eric Ebron was named a First-team All-American for his efforts in the 2013 season.

List of All-Americans showing the year won, player, position and selectors (Note: Statistics correct as of 2012 NCAA Division I FBS football season.)
Year	Player name	Position	Selector(s)
1929	Ray Farris	G	NEA-2; AP-3
1933	George Barclay	G	AP-3; CP-3
1934	George Barclay	G	AP-1; CP-2; NEA-1; NANA-1; WC-1; CSW-2; GR-1; AAB-1; NYWT-1; CD-2; AR-1; ILA-1; HST-1; LLT-1; WILL-1; NYS-1; CHPT-2; UP-2; TTT-2; APT-2; RGT-2; BCT-2
1934	Jim Hutchins	B	AAB-HM
1935	Donald Jackson	B	AP-2; CP-2; NEA-2
1936	Andy Bershak	E	AP-2;
1937	Andy Bershak†	E	AP-3; UP-2; COL-1; INS-3; NEA-1; CP-1; CE-1
1938	Steve Maronic	T	CP-1; UP-2; NEA-2; AP-3. EDT-1; NSWK-2; WWF-2; CH-3
1939	George Stirnweiss	B	CP-2; NEA-3; BCT-3
1939	Jim Lalanne	B	BST-2; INS-2; NEA-3; HST-3; WILL-3
1939	Paul Severin	E	AP-1; WILL-1; NEA-2; DBT-3; UP-3; WWF-3
1940	Paul Severin	E	AP-1; WILL-1; NEA-1; DBT-1; UP-2; WWF-2; NYN-1; BOS-1; NSWK-1; CNB-1; BST-2; CSW-2; CP-2; INS-2; NYS-2; BCT-2; JCT-2
1943	Ray Poole	E	BST-3
1946	Charlie Justice	TB	AP-3; UP-2; NEA-2; FC-3; SW-3; GW-2; PIC-2
1947	Charlie Justice	TB	AP-2; NEA-2; INS-3; CP-3;
1947	Walt Pupa	FB	APT-3
1948	Charlie Justice†	TB	AP-1; UP-2; NEA-1; FC-1; SW-1; INS-1; CP-1; AAB-1; WILL-1; APT-1; TSN-1; PMT-1; BST-1; PG-1; FD-1; BOS-1; CFI-1; NYN-1; CF-1; DHT-1; FWAA-2
1948	Len Szafaryn	T	FWAA-2
1948	Art Weiner	E	FWAA-1; NYS-1; TSN-2; APT-2; CP-3; NEA-2
1949	Charlie Justice	TB	AP-1; UP-2; FC-1; INS-1; CP-1; AAB-1; WILL-1; APT-1; TSN-1; PMT-1; PG-1; FD-1; CFI-1; FWAA-3
1949	Ken Powell	E	NEA-1
1949	Art Weiner	E	FWAA-2; UP-1; TSN-1; NYN-1; SR-1; SLGD-1; DHT-1; APT-2; CP-2; NEA-3; INS-2; FD-2; PG-2
1950	Irv Holdash	C, LB	AP-1; NEA-1; APT-1; AAB-1; FD-1; BST-1; BOS-1; GR-1; PG-1; HLMS-1; UP-2; CP-2; TSN-2
1958	Phil Blazer	T	FD-2; CP-3
1958	Al Goldstein	B	FWAA-1; NEA-1
1961	Jim Lecompte	G	NEA-3
1963	Bob Lacey	E	AP-1; FWAA-1; NEA-2
1964	Ken Willard	FB	FC-2
1969	Ed Chalupka	G	AP-3
1970	Don McCauley†	TB	AP-1; FWAA-1; FC-1; CP-1; WC-1; FN-1; UP-2
1972	Ron Rusnak	G	AP-1; UP-2; FWAA-2; FC-1; FN-2
1972	Jerry Sain	T	FN-2
1974	Ken Huff†	G	AP-1; FC-1; NEA-1; TSN-1; WC-1; Time-1; PW-1; FN-2; UP-2
1974	Charles Waddell	TE	TSN-1
1976	Mark Cantrell	C	FN-2
1976	Mike Voight	TB	AP-2; UPI-2
1977	Dee Hardison†	DT	AP-1; FWAA-1; FC-1; UP-2; NEA-2; CPFN-2
1977	Mike Salzano	G	FN-3
1979	Ricky Barden	DB	RST-1; FN-2
1979	Ron Wooten	G	FN-2
1980	Rick Donnalley	C	AP-2; FN-3
1980	Amos Lawrence	TB	FN-3; CPFN-3
1980	Lawrence Taylor‡	LB	AP-1; UP-1; FC-1; FWAA-1; TSN-1; FN-1; CPFN-1; NEA-2
1980	Donnell Thompson	DT	FN-3
1980	Ron Wooten	G	FN-1; WC-1; NEA-1; MZLU-1; UP-2; CPFN-2; AP-3
1981	David Drechsler	G	FWAA-1; FN-2
1981	Greg Poole	DB	FN-3
1982	David Drechsler	G	FWAA-1; FN-1; WC-1; MZLU-1; AP-2; UP-2; NEA-2; CPFN-2
1982	William Fuller	DT	FWAA-1; FN-1; CPFN-1; AP-2
1983	Brian Blados	T	AP-1; NEA-1; UP-2; CPFN-2; FN-3
1983	William Fuller†	DT	FN-1; CPFN-1; FC-1; WC-1; TSN-1; AP-2; UP-2; NEA-2
1983	Ethan Horton	TB	FN-3
1984	Ethan Horton	TB	AP-3; UPI-2
1986	Harris Barton	T	AP-1; NEA-1; ATH-1; JB-1; TSN-2; FN-3
1986	Derrick Fenner	RB	CPFN-3
1987	Carlton Bailey	NG	NEA-2
1988	Jeff Garnica	C	AP-3
1989	Pat Crowley	G	MZLU-1; FN-3
1990	Kevin Donnalley	T	CPFN-3
1992	Natrone Means	TB	FN-3
1992	Randall Parsons	C	AP-3
1993	Bracy Walker	FS	FC-1; FWAA-1; SH-1; AP-2; UP-2; TSN-2; FN-3
1994	Marcus Jones	DE, DT	AP-3
1995	Marcus Jones†	DE, DT	AP-1; FC-1; WC-1; UP-1; CS-1; TSN-2
1996	Freddie Jones	TE	FN-3
1996	Dré Bly†	CB	AP-1; WC-1; FWAA-1; TSN-1; FN-2
1996	Greg Ellis	DE	TSN-2; AP-3; FN-3
1996	Brian Simmons	LB	AP-2; TSN-2
1997	Dré Bly†	CB	AP-1; WC-1; FWAA-1; FN-1; TSN-3
1997	Greg Ellis†	DE	AP-1; WC-1; FC-1; FN-1; TSN-2
1997	Kivuusama Mays	LB	AP-3
1997	Brian Simmons†	LB	AP-1; WC-1; FN-1; TSN-3
1998	Dré Bly	CB	WC-1; FN-3
1999	Brian Schmitz	P	TSN-1
2000	Julius Peppers	DE	AP-2; WC-2; FN-2; CNNSI-1
2001	Ryan Sims	DT	AP-3
2001	Julius Peppers‡	DE	AP-1; WC-1; FN-1; TSN-1; FWAA-1; FC-1; CNNSI-1
2004	Jason Brown	C	PFW-1
2008	Trimane Goddard	DB	AP-2; WC-2; RVLS-3
2010	Quinton Coples	DE	SCT-2
2012	Giovani Bernard	RB	AP-3
2012	Jonathan Cooper‡	G	AP-1; WC-1; FWAA-1; AFCA-1; TSN-1; PFW-1
2012	Sylvester Williams	DT	PFW-1
2013	Eric Ebron	TE	ESPN-1; AP-2; ATH-2; CBS-2; CNNSI-2; USA-2; WC-2
2013	Ryan Switzer	WR, PR	FWAA-1; ESPN-1; ATH-1; CBS-2; USA-2
2015	Landon Turner	G	AP-1; ATH-1; FWAA-2; CBS-2
2015	Ryan Switzer	APB	AFCA-1
