= Olderman =

Olderman is a Swedish surname. Notable people with the surname include:

- Bob Olderman (1962–1993), American football player
- Murray Olderman (1922–2020), American cartoonist and sportswriter
