= 1984 Clemson Tigers football team =

American college football season

1984 Clemson Tigers football
- Conference: Atlantic Coast Conference
- Record: 7–4 (0–0 ACC)
- Head coach: Danny Ford (6th full, 7th overall season)
- Offensive coordinator: Nelson Stokley (5th season)
- Captains: Mike Eppley; William Perry
- Home stadium: Memorial Stadium

1984 Atlantic Coast Conference football standings
	Conf.					Overall
Team	W		L		T	W		L		T
No. 12 Maryland $	5	–	0	–	0	9	–	3	–	0
No. 20 Virginia	3	–	1	–	2	8	–	2	–	2
North Carolina	3	–	2	–	1	5	–	5	–	1
Wake Forest	3	–	3	–	0	6	–	5	–	0
Georgia Tech	2	–	2	–	1	6	–	4	–	1
NC State	1	–	5	–	0	3	–	8	–	0
Duke	1	–	5	–	0	2	–	9	–	0
Clemson	0	–	0	–	0*	7	–	4	–	0
$ – Conference champion; * – Clemson was under NCAA and ACC probation and was ineligible for the ACC title. As a result, their ACC games did not count in the league standings.; Rankings from AP Poll

The 1984 Clemson Tigers football team was an American football team that represented Clemson University in the Atlantic Coast Conference (ACC) during the 1984 NCAA Division I-A football season. In its seventh season under head coach Danny Ford, the team compiled a 7–4 record (5–2 on the field against conference opponents, but officially 0–0), and outscored opponents by a total of 346 to 215. The team played its home games at Memorial Stadium in Clemson, South Carolina.

The 1984 season was Clemson's final season on probation for violation of recruiting rules. The probation was imposed by the NCAA and ACC on November 21, 1982, and expired on January 2, 1985. As a result of the probation, the 1984 Clemson team was ineligible for the ACC championship and postseason play, and their games against ACC opponents were not counted in the official league standings.

Quarterback Mike Eppley and defensive tackle William Perry were the team captains. The team's statistical leaders included quarterback Mike Eppley with 1,484 passing yards, Stacey Driver with 627 rushing yards, Terrance Roulhac with 512 receiving yards, and placekicker Donald Igwebuike with 89 points scored (16 field goals, 41 extra points).

== Schedule ==
Date	Time	Opponent	Rank	Site	Result	Attendance	Source
September 1	1:00 p.m.	Appalachian State*	No. 4	Memorial Stadium; Clemson, SC	W 40–7	75,398	
September 8	7:00 p.m.	at Virginia	No. 3	Scott Stadium; Charlottesville, VA	W 55–0	38,676	
September 22	1:30 p.m.	at No. 20 Georgia*	No. 2	Sanford Stadium; Athens, GA (rivalry)	L 23–26	82,122	
September 29	1:30 p.m.	at No. 18 Georgia Tech	No. 13	Grant Field; Atlanta, GA (rivalry)	L 21–28	57,704	
October 6	1:00 p.m.	North Carolina		Memorial Stadium; Clemson, SC	W 20–12	80,111	
October 20	1:00 p.m.	Duke^{†}		Memorial Stadium; Clemson, SC	W 54–21	80,617	
October 27	1:00 p.m.	at NC State		Carter–Finley Stadium; Raleigh, NC (Textile Bowl)	W 35–24	44,100	
November 3	1:00 p.m.	Wake Forest		Memorial Stadium; Clemson, SC	W 37–14	71,697	
November 10	1:00 p.m.	Virginia Tech*		Memorial Stadium; Clemson, SC	W 17–10	77,754	
November 17	1:00 p.m.	at Maryland	No. 20	Memorial Stadium; Baltimore, MD	L 23–41	60,575	
November 24	1:00 p.m.	No. 9 South Carolina*		Memorial Stadium; Clemson, SC (rivalry)	L 21–22	80,500	
*Non-conference game; ^{†}Homecoming; Rankings from AP Poll released prior to the game; All times are in Eastern time

== Roster ==
1984 Clemson Tigers football team roster
Players
Coaches
Offense

Pos.	#	Name	Class
TE		K. D. Dunn	Sr
QB	10	Mike Eppley	Sr

Defense

Pos.	#	Name	Class
DB		Tyrone Davis	Sr
DT	91	Michael Dean Perry	Fr
DT	66	William Perry	Sr
DB		Reggie Pleasant	Sr

Special teams

Pos.	#	Name	Class
P	5	Dale Hatcher	Sr
K	8	Donald Igwebuike	Sr

Head coach

- Danny Ford

Coordinators/assistant coaches

Legend

- (C) Team captain
- (S) Suspended
- (I) Ineligible
- Injured
- Redshirt

== 1985 NFL draft ==
Player	Position	Round	Pick	NFL club
William Perry	Defensive tackle	1	22	Chicago Bears
Tyrone Davis	Cornerback	3	58	New York Giants
Dale Hatcher	Punter	3	77	Los Angeles Rams
K. D. Dunn	Tight end	5	116	St. Louis Cardinals
Reggie Pleasant	Defensive back	6	152	Atlanta Falcons
Donald Igwebuike	Kicker	10	260	Tampa Bay Buccaneers
