= 1984 Wake Forest Demon Deacons football team =

American college football season

1984 Wake Forest Demon Deacons football
- Conference: Atlantic Coast Conference
- Record: 6–5 (3–3 ACC)
- Head coach: Al Groh (4th season)
- Captains: Ronnie Burgess; Tony Coates; Ken McAllister; Mike Nesselt
- Home stadium: Groves Stadium

1984 Atlantic Coast Conference football standings
	Conf.					Overall
Team	W		L		T	W		L		T
No. 12 Maryland $	5	–	0	–	0	9	–	3	–	0
No. 20 Virginia	3	–	1	–	2	8	–	2	–	2
North Carolina	3	–	2	–	1	5	–	5	–	1
Wake Forest	3	–	3	–	0	6	–	5	–	0
Georgia Tech	2	–	2	–	1	6	–	4	–	1
NC State	1	–	5	–	0	3	–	8	–	0
Duke	1	–	5	–	0	2	–	9	–	0
Clemson	0	–	0	–	0*	7	–	4	–	0
$ – Conference champion; * – Clemson was under NCAA and ACC probation and was ineligible for the ACC title. As a result, their ACC games did not count in the league standings.; Rankings from AP Poll

The 1984 Wake Forest Demon Deacons football team was an American football team that represented Wake Forest University during the 1984 NCAA Division I-A football season. In their fourth season under head coach Al Groh, the Demon Deacons compiled a 6–5 record and finished in fourth place in the Atlantic Coast Conference.

== Schedule ==
Date	Opponent	Site	TV	Result	Attendance	Source
September 8	Virginia Tech*	Groves Stadium; Winston-Salem, NC		L 20–21	26,543	
September 15	Appalachian State*	Groves Stadium; Winston-Salem, NC		W 17–13	22,700	
September 22	at NC State	Carter–Finley Stadium; Raleigh, NC (rivalry)		W 24–15	34,300	
September 29	at Maryland	Byrd Stadium; College Park, MD		L 17–38	32,700	
October 6	at Richmond*	University of Richmond Stadium; Richmond, VA		W 29–16	15,126	
October 13	North Carolina	Groves Stadium; Winston-Salem, NC (rivalry)		W 14–3	33,778	
October 20	at Virginia	Scott Stadium; Charlottesville, VA	ABC	L 9–28	38,671	
October 27	William & Mary*	Groves Stadium; Winston-Salem, NC		W 34–21	23,712	
November 3	at Clemson*^{A}	Memorial Stadium; Clemson, SC		L 14–37	71,697	
November 10	at Duke	Wallace Wade Stadium; Durham, NC (rivalry)		W 20–16	28,000	
November 17	Georgia Tech	Groves Stadium; Winston-Salem, NC		L 7–24	22,700	
*Non-conference game

A. Clemson was under NCAA probation, and was ineligible for the ACC title. Therefore this game did not count in the league standings.

== Team leaders ==
Category	Team Leader	Att/Cth	Yds
Passing	Foy White	143/252	1,544
Rushing	Michael Ramseur	214	961
Receiving	Duane Owens	30	420
