= Gary Baldinger =

American football player (born 1963)

No. 91, 94, 92
- Positions: Defensive tackle, defensive end

Personal information
- Born: October 4, 1963 (age 63); Philadelphia, Pennsylvania, U.S.
- Listed height: 6 ft 3 in (1.91 m)
- Listed weight: 264 lb (120 kg)

Career information
- High school: Massapequa (Massapequa, New York)
- College: Wake Forest
- NFL draft: 1986: 9th round, 229th overall pick

Career history
- Kansas City Chiefs (1986–1988); Atlanta Falcons (1989)*; Indianapolis Colts (1990); Buffalo Bills (1990–1992)
- * Offseason or practice squad member only

Awards and highlights
- First-team All-ACC (1984)

Career NFL statistics
- Games played: 44
- Games started: 4
- Stats at Pro Football Reference

Gary Thomas Baldinger (born October 4, 1963) is an American former professional football player who was a defensive lineman for six seasons in the National Football League (NFL), primarily with the Kansas City Chiefs. He played college football for the Wake Forest Demon Deacons and was selected by the Chiefs in the ninth round of the 1986 NFL draft.

His older brother Rich Baldinger was his teammate with the Chiefs and also played at Wake Forest University. His oldest brother Brian Baldinger also played in the NFL and currently is a broadcaster.

Like his brothers, he graduated from Massapequa High School.

His son, Brad Baldinger is a two-sport athlete in baseball and football, better known as a catcher for Denison University.
