= Joe Milinichik =

American football player (born 1963)

No. 74, 71
- Position: Guard

Personal information
- Born: March 30, 1963 (age 63); Allentown, Pennsylvania, U.S.
- Listed height: 6 ft 5 in (1.96 m)
- Listed weight: 290 lb (132 kg)

Career information
- High school: Emmaus (Emmaus, Pennsylvania)
- College: NC State
- NFL draft: 1986: 3rd round, 69th overall pick

Career history
- Detroit Lions (1987–1989); Los Angeles Rams (1990–1992); San Diego Chargers (1993–1994)

Awards and highlights
- First-team All-American (1985); 3× First-team All-ACC (1983, 1984, 1985)

Career NFL statistics
- Games played: 96
- Games started: 63
- Fumble recoveries: 1
- Stats at Pro Football Reference

Joseph Michael Milinichik (born March 30, 1963) is an American former professional football player who was a guard for eight seasons in the National Football League (NFL) with the Detroit Lions, Los Angeles Rams, and San Diego Chargers. He played college football for the NC State Wolfpack, earning first-team All-American honors in 1985.

== Early life and education ==
Milinichik was born March 30, 1963, in Allentown, Pennsylvania. He began his football career at Emmaus High School in Emmaus, Pennsylvania, which competes in Pennsylvania's Eastern Pennsylvania Conference.

=== North Carolina State ===
He played collegiate football at North Carolina State in Raleigh, North Carolina, where he was a first-team All-American as a senior.

== National Football League ==
=== Detroit Lions ===
Following his collegiate playing career at North Carolina State, Milinichik entered the 1986 NFL draft and was selected by the Detroit Lions in the third round with the 69th overall selection. He played for the Lions in the 1987, 1988, and 1989 seasons. With Detroit in 1989, Milinichik was a blocking a guard for Pro Football Hall of Fame running back Barry Sanders during Sanders' rookie season.

=== Los Angeles Rams ===
Milinichik then played for the Los Angeles Rams in the 1990, 1991, and 1992 seasons.

=== San Diego Chargers ===
He finished his career with the San Diego Chargers, where he played in the 1993 and 1994 seasons. On January 29, 1995, he played with the Chargers in their Super Bowl XXIX loss to the San Francisco 49ers.
