= 1984 All-Atlantic Coast Conference football team =

American college football all-star team

The 1984 All-Atlantic Coast Conference football team consists of American football players chosen by various selectors for their All-Atlantic Coast Conference ("ACC") teams for the 1984 college football season. Selectors in 1984 included the Associated Press (AP).

== Offensive selections ==
=== Wide receivers ===
- Greg Hill, Maryland (AP)
- Terrance Roulhac, Clemson (AP)

=== Tackles ===
- Jim Dombrowski, Virginia (AP)
- Joe Milinichik, NC State (AP)

=== Guards ===
- Bob Olderman, Virginia (AP)
- Steve Reese, Clemson (AP)

=== Centers ===
- Kevin Glover, Maryland (AP)

=== Tight ends ===
- Ken Whisenhunt, Georgia Tech (AP)

=== Quarterbacks ===
- John Dewberry, Georgia Tech (AP)

=== Running backs ===
- Ethan Horton, North Carolina (AP)
- Robert Lavette, Georgia Tech (AP)

== Defensive selections ==
=== Defensive linemen ===
- William Perry, Clemson (AP)
- Ron Maltes, Virginia (AP)
- Gary Baldinger, Wake Forest (AP)
- David Bond, Virginia (AP)
- Bruce Mesner, Maryland (AP)

=== Linebackers ===
- Eric Wilson, Maryland (AP)
- Micah Moon, North Carolina (AP)

=== Defensive backs ===
- Lester Lyles, Virginia (AP)
- Ronnie Burgess, Wake Forest (AP)
- Al Covington, Maryland (AP)
- Ronald Watson, Clemson (AP)

== Special teams ==
=== Placekickers ===
- Donald Igwebuike, Clemson (AP)

=== Punters ===
- Dale Hatcher, Clemson (AP)

== Key ==
AP = Associated Press

== See also ==
1984 College Football All-America Team
