= Massapequa High School =

High school in Massapequa, New York

Massapequa High School – Main Campus

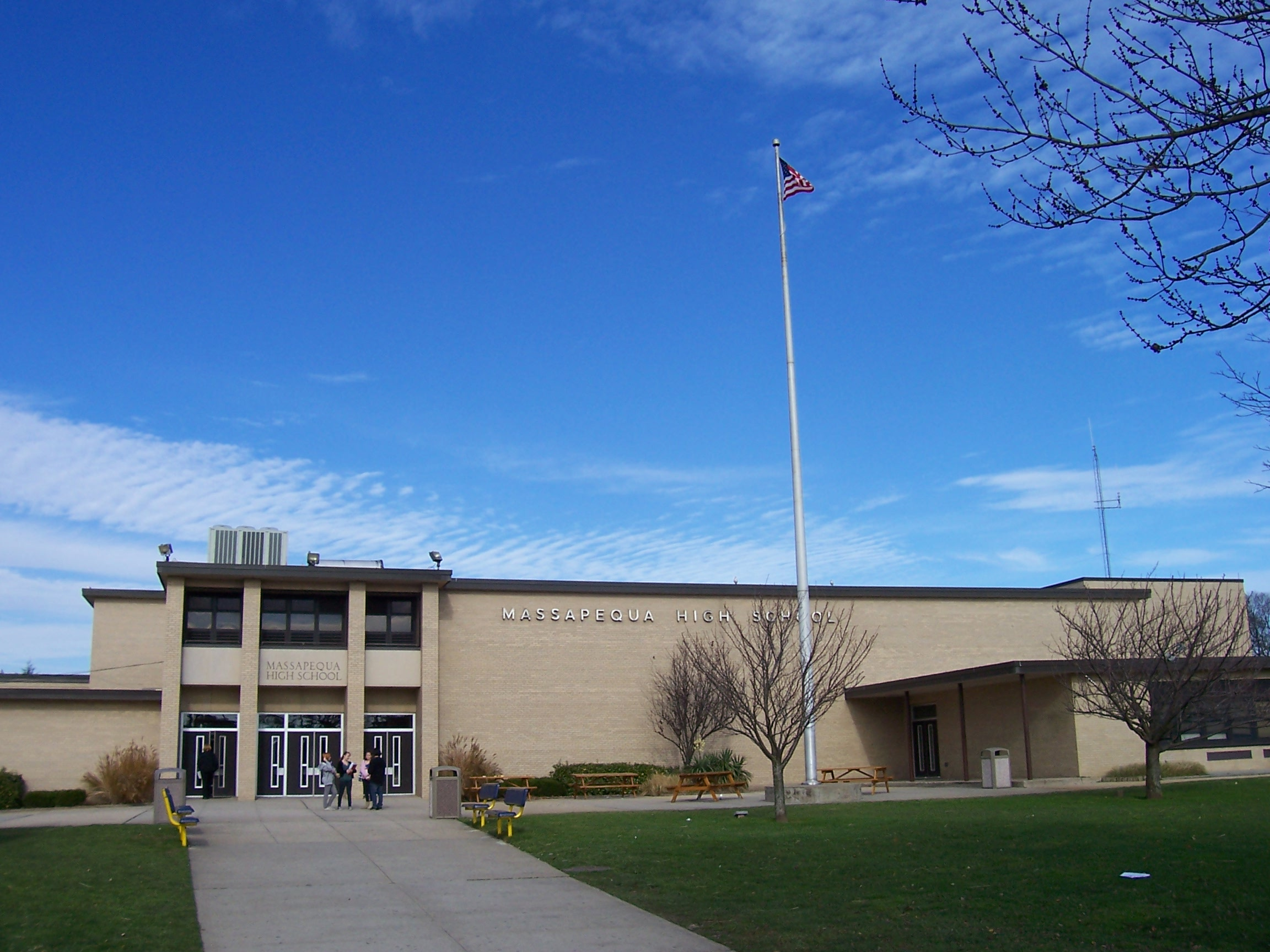

Location
- 4925 Merrick Road; Massapequa, New York 11758; United States; 40°40′04″N 73°27′12″W

Information
- Established: 1955
- School district: Massapequa Union Free School District
- NCES School ID: 361863001688
- Principal: Barbara Lowell
- Teaching staff: 137.71 FTEs
- Grades: 10–12
- Enrollment: 1,439 (as of 2023–2024)
- Student to teacher ratio: 10.45
- Colors: Navy blue and gold
- Team name: Chiefs
- Website: Massapequa Public Schools

Massapequa High School is a public high school located in Massapequa, in Nassau County, on Long Island, in New York, United States. The Main Campus serves students in grades 10 through 12, while the separate Ames Campus serves 9th-grade students.

== History ==
Massapequa High School's first graduating class, the class of 1956, remained at the elementary school located at Hicksville Road for its freshman year and then spent the next two years at what was to become East Lake Junior High School (now known as East Lake Elementary School). Massapequa High School opened in its own location on Merrick Road in September 1955.

Berner High School opened in 1962 to relieve the growing population of Massapequa High School. In 1987, after a decline in district enrollment, Berner High School closed as a high school and became Berner Middle School, serving 6th–8th grade students in the district.

Massapequa High School underwent an expansion in the northeast corner of the school, with construction of a new wing with eight classrooms completed in September 2007. The school's football and baseball fields, as well as the track, were redone during the spring and summer of 2017; this resulted in the school's tennis courts being relocated towards the south entrance.

== Ames Campus ==
Massapequa High School – Ames Campus

Location
- 198 Baltimore Avenue; Massapequa, New York 11758; United States; 40°41′06″N 73°27′52″W

Information
- School district: Massapequa Union Free School District
- NCES School ID: 361863003506
- Principal: Tania Willman
- Grades: 9
- Enrollment: 475
- Colors: Navy blue and gold
- Team name: Chiefs
- Website: Massapequa Public Schools

Students in the 9th grade attend the Ames Campus, which is separate from the main campus and is adjacent to Lockhart Elementary School.

== Student demographics ==
As of the 2021–22 school year, the school had an enrollment of 1,496 students and 150.7 classroom teachers (on an FTE basis), for a student–teacher ratio of 9.9:1. There were 98 students (6.6% of enrollment) eligible for free lunch and 20 (1.3% of students) eligible for reduced-cost lunch.

== Mascot ==
The "Chief" mascot and the town's name is in reference to the Massapequa Tribe, which lived on Long Island before the arrival of European settlers in the 1600s.

In 2023, the New York State Board of Regents issued guidance that banned the use of Native American mascots, team names, and logos being displayed in public schools mascot. Districts that fail to comply with this requirement by June 30, 2025 face losing state aid. The Board of Regents cited research from the American Psychological Organization that continued usage of Native American-related symbols and imagery has a negative effect on all students.

In March 2025, a federal judge ruled in favor of the Board of Regents, dismissing a lawsuit by four Long Island districts including Massapequa that challenged the state ban. In April 2025, U.S. President Donald Trump posted to Truth Social that he supported the preservation of the mascot. Trump urged Linda McMahon, the Secretary of Education, to intervene on behalf of the district. McMahon visited the district in May 2025, announcing that the New York State Department of Education could lose federal funding or be investigated by the Department of Justice if they did not rescind the ban, and stated that the ban is a violation of civil rights. The chief of the Unkechaug Nation claimed that no civil rights were violated, calling the mascot a "caricature".

== Notable alumni ==
- Ted Alflen (born 1946), former pro football player
- Brian Baldinger (born 1959), former pro football player
- Gary Baldinger (born 1963), former pro football player
- Rich Baldinger (born 1959), former pro football player
- Alec Baldwin (born 1958, class of 1976), actor, member of the Baldwin family
- Billy Baldwin (born 1963, class of 1981), actor, member of the Baldwin family
- Phil Baroni (born 1976), wrestler, professional mixed martial artist, formerly with the UFC
- Matt Bennett (born 1991, class of 2009), actor/singer
- Hope Breslin (born 1999, class of 2017), professional soccer player
- Joey Buttafuoco (born 1956, class of 1974), auto body shop owner best known for having an affair with a 17-year-old girl who later shot his wife
- Mary Jo Buttafuoco (born 1955, class of 1974), motivational speaker, and ex-wife of Joey Buttafuoco
- Candy Darling (1944–1974), transgender Andy Warhol superstar
- Albert DeMeo, son of Gambino mobster Roy Demeo
- Jennifer DeSena, attorney and the 38th town supervisor of North Hempstead, New York
- Kathy Fleming (born 1967, class of 1985), former pro runner
- Jessica Hahn (born 1959, class of 1977), Playboy model, actor, focus of Jim Bakker scandal
- Rex Heuermann (born 1963, class of 1981), convicted Gilgo Beach serial killer
- Anthony Ingrassia (1944–1995), playwright, producer and director
- Kristin Juszczyk (born 1994, class of 2012), fashion designer
- Brian Kilmeade (born 1964, class of 1982), television host and author
- Ron Kovic (born 1946, class of 1964), activist
- Jerry Seinfeld (born 1954, class of 1972), comedian
- Brian Setzer (born 1959, class of 1977), musician
- Casey Stern (born 1978, class of 1996), SiriusXM radio personality
- Christie Welsh, (born 1981), former professional soccer player
