= 1984 Georgia Tech Yellow Jackets football team =

American college football season

1984 Georgia Tech Yellow Jackets football
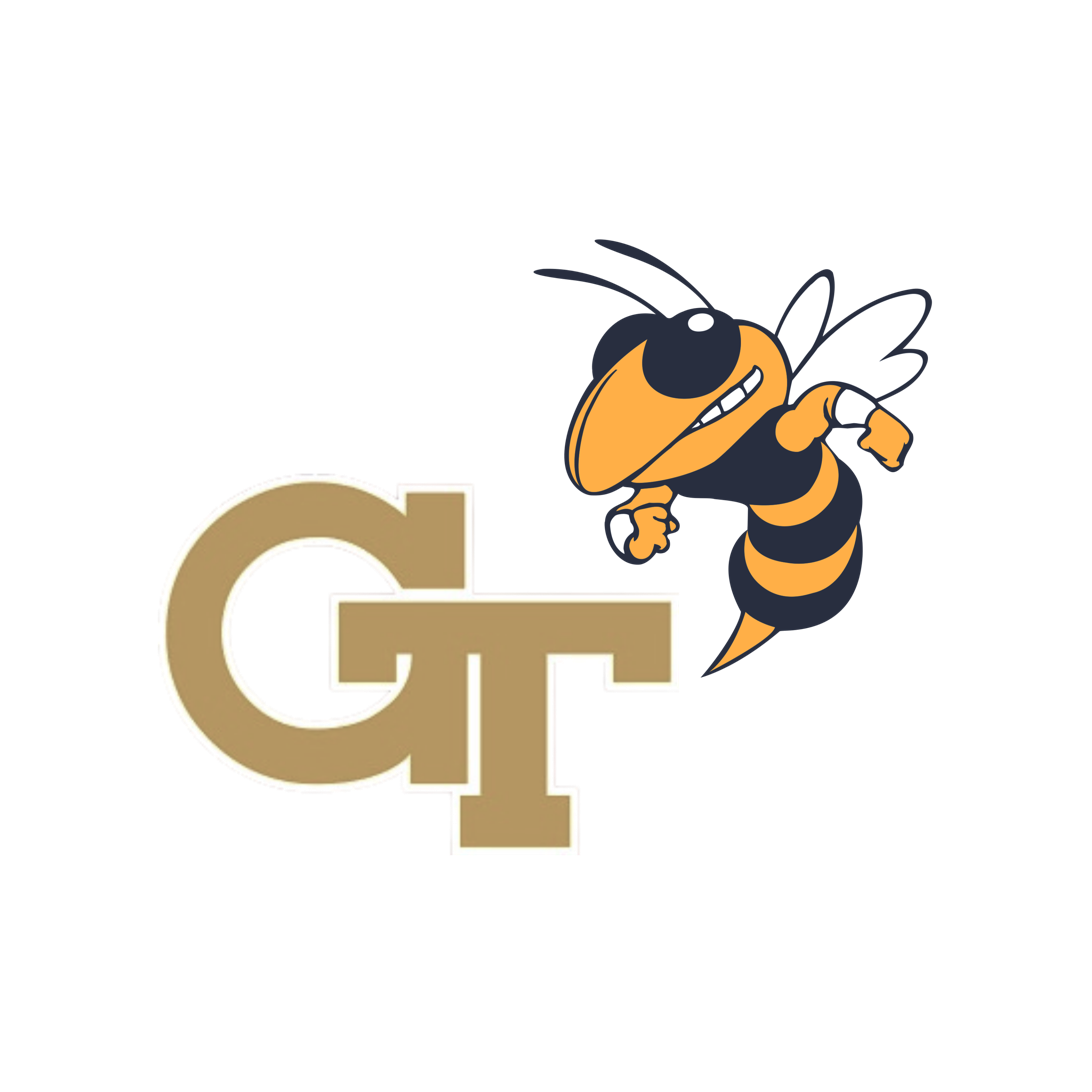
- Conference: Atlantic Coast Conference
- Record: 6–4–1 (2–2–1 ACC)
- Head coach: Bill Curry (5th season)
- Offensive coordinator: Dwain Painter (3rd season)
- Defensive coordinator: Don Lindsey (1st season)
- Captains: David Bell; Donnie Chisholm; Robert Lavette
- Home stadium: Grant Field

1984 Atlantic Coast Conference football standings
	Conf.					Overall
Team	W		L		T	W		L		T
No. 12 Maryland $	5	–	0	–	0	9	–	3	–	0
No. 20 Virginia	3	–	1	–	2	8	–	2	–	2
North Carolina	3	–	2	–	1	5	–	5	–	1
Wake Forest	3	–	3	–	0	6	–	5	–	0
Georgia Tech	2	–	2	–	1	6	–	4	–	1
NC State	1	–	5	–	0	3	–	8	–	0
Duke	1	–	5	–	0	2	–	9	–	0
Clemson	0	–	0	–	0*	7	–	4	–	0
$ – Conference champion; * – Clemson was under NCAA and ACC probation and was ineligible for the ACC title. As a result, their ACC games did not count in the league standings.; Rankings from AP Poll

The 1984 Georgia Tech Yellow Jackets football team represented the Georgia Institute of Technology during the 1984 NCAA Division I-A football season. The Yellow Jackets were led by fifth-year head coach Bill Curry, and played their home games at Grant Field in Atlanta. In their second year as members of the Atlantic Coast Conference, the team finished in fifth with a final record of 6–4–1 (2–2–1 ACC).

== Schedule ==
Date	Opponent	Rank	Site	TV	Result	Attendance	Source
September 15	No. 19 Alabama*		Grant Field; Atlanta, GA (rivalry)	TBS	W 16–6	56,107	
September 22	The Citadel*		Grant Field; Atlanta, GA		W 48–3	31,684	
September 29	No. 13 Clemson*^{A}	No. 18	Grant Field; Atlanta, GA (rivalry)	ESPN	W 28–21	57,704	
October 6	NC State	No. 12	Grant Field; Atlanta, GA	Raycom	L 22–27	32,627	
October 13	at Virginia	No. 20	Scott Stadium; Charlottesville, VA		T 20–20	40,067	
October 20	at No. 13 Auburn*		Jordan-Hare Stadium; Auburn, AL (rivalry)		L 34–48	75,216	
October 27	Tennessee*		Grant Field; Atlanta, GA (rivalry)		L 21–24	45,167	
November 3	Duke^{†}		Grant Field; Atlanta, GA		W 31–3	36,393	
November 10	at North Carolina		Kenan Memorial Stadium; Chapel Hill NC		L 17–24	47,000	
November 17	at Wake Forest		Groves Stadium; Winston-Salem, NC		W 24–7	22,700	
December 1	at No. 18 Georgia*		Sanford Stadium; Athens, GA (Clean, Old-Fashioned Hate)	Raycom	W 35–18	82,122	
*Non-conference game; ^{†}Homecoming; Rankings from AP Poll released prior to the game

A.Clemson was under NCAA probation, and was ineligible for the ACC title. Therefore this game did not count in the league standings.

== Roster ==
1984 Georgia Tech Yellow Jackets football team roster
Players
Coaches
Offense

Pos.	#	Name	Class
RB		Robert Lavette
WR		David Dean	Jr
TE	9	Ken Whisenhunt
OL		Derek Gwinn
OL		John Ivemeyer
OL		John Thomas
OL		John Davis
OL		Tony Kepano
QB		John Dewberry

Defense

Pos.	#	Name	Class
DL		Bobby Hodge
DL		Donnie Chisholm
LB		Rob Horton
LB		Dante Jones
LB		Pat Swilling
LB		Ted Roof
CB	22	Jack Westbrook
DB		Mike Travis

Special teams

Pos.	#	Name	Class
K		David Bell

Head coach

- Bill Curry

Coordinators/assistant coaches

- Dwain Painter – Offensive coordinator
- Rip Scherer – Running backs/Assistant head coach
- Jack Fligg – Offensive tackle/tight ends
- Mac McWhorter – Offensive line
- Don Lindsey – Defensive coordinator
- Larry New – Defensive line
- John Guy – Outside linebackers
- Rick Smith – Defensive backs
- Keith Colson – Defensive backs

Legend

- (C) Team captain
- (S) Suspended
- (I) Ineligible
- Injured
- Redshirt
