= 1984 North Carolina Tar Heels football team =

American college football season

1984 North Carolina Tar Heels football
- Conference: Atlantic Coast Conference
- Record: 5–5–1 (3–2–1 ACC)
- Head coach: Dick Crum (7th season)
- Captain: Brian Johnston
- Home stadium: Kenan Memorial Stadium

1984 Atlantic Coast Conference football standings
	Conf.					Overall
Team	W		L		T	W		L		T
No. 12 Maryland $	5	–	0	–	0	9	–	3	–	0
No. 20 Virginia	3	–	1	–	2	8	–	2	–	2
North Carolina	3	–	2	–	1	5	–	5	–	1
Wake Forest	3	–	3	–	0	6	–	5	–	0
Georgia Tech	2	–	2	–	1	6	–	4	–	1
NC State	1	–	5	–	0	3	–	8	–	0
Duke	1	–	5	–	0	2	–	9	–	0
Clemson	0	–	0	–	0*	7	–	4	–	0
$ – Conference champion; * – Clemson was under NCAA and ACC probation and was ineligible for the ACC title. As a result, their ACC games did not count in the league standings.; Rankings from AP Poll

The 1984 North Carolina Tar Heels football team represented the University of North Carolina at Chapel Hill during the 1984 NCAA Division I-A football season. The Tar Heels were led by seventh-year head coach Dick Crum and played their home games at Kenan Memorial Stadium in Chapel Hill, North Carolina. They competed as members of the Atlantic Coast Conference, finishing in third.

== Schedule ==
Date	Time	Opponent	Site	TV	Result	Attendance	Source
September 15	12:00 p.m.	Navy*	Kenan Memorial Stadium; Chapel Hill, NC		L 30–33	49,500	
September 22	7:30 p.m.	at No. 10 Boston College*	Sullivan Stadium; Foxborough, MA	ESPN	L 20–52	44,671	
September 29	1:00 p.m.	Kansas*	Kenan Memorial Stadium; Chapel Hill, NC		W 23–17	45,000	
October 6	1:00 p.m.	at Clemson*^{A}	Memorial Stadium; Clemson, SC		L 12–20	80,000	
October 13	12:20 p.m.	at Wake Forest	Groves Stadium; Winston-Salem, NC (rivalry)		L 3–14	33,778	
October 20	12:00 p.m.	NC State	Kenan Memorial Stadium; Chapel Hill, NC (rivalry)		W 28–21	50,600	
October 27	7:30 p.m.	at Memphis State*	Liberty Bowl Memorial Stadium; Memphis, TN		W 30–27	37,781	
November 3	12:15 p.m.	Maryland	Kenan Memorial Stadium; Chapel Hill, NC		L 23–34	48,000	
November 10	1:00 p.m.	Georgia Tech	Kenan Memorial Stadium; Chapel Hill, NC		W 24–17	47,000	
November 17	1:00 p.m.	No. 19 Virginia	Kenan Memorial Stadium; Chapel Hill, NC (South's Oldest Rivalry)		T 24–24	48,000	
November 24	1:30 p.m.	at Duke	Wallace Wade Stadium; Durham, NC (Victory Bell)		W 17–15	31,200	
*Non-conference game; Rankings from AP Poll released prior to the game

A. Clemson was under NCAA probation, and was ineligible for the ACC title. Therefore this game did not count in the league standings.

== Personnel ==
1984 North Carolina Tar Heels football team roster
Players
Coaches
Offense

Pos.	#	Name	Class
QB		Kevin Anthony
RB		Eddie Colson
RB		Ethan Horton	Sr
QB		Mark Maye
WR		Eric Streater

Defense

Pos.	#	Name	Class

Special teams

Pos.	#	Name	Class
K		Lee Gilarmis
K		Rob Rogers

Head coach

- Dick Crum

Coordinators/assistant coaches

Legend

- (C) Team captain
- (S) Suspended
- (I) Ineligible
- Injured
- Redshirt
