= Kristin Juszczyk =

American fashion designer (born 1994)

- Juszczyk in 2024
- Born: Kristin Arceri; February 11, 1994 (age 32); Massapequa, New York, U.S.
- Education: Towson University (BA)
- Occupation: Fashion designer
- Spouse: Kyle Juszczyk (m. 2019)

Kristin Juszczyk (née Arceri; born February 11, 1994) is an American fashion designer.

== Early life ==
Kristin Juszczyk and husband Kyle Juszczyk in 2024

Kristin Arceri was born and raised in Massapequa, New York, located on Long Island. She graduated from Massapequa High School in 2012, and from Towson University in Baltimore, Maryland with a business degree in 2016. Before Towson, she went to the University of Rhode Island. She met her husband, NFL fullback Kyle Juszczyk, as a Towson student while he played for the Baltimore Ravens.

Juszczyk has no formal training in fashion design and is self-taught, attributing her knowledge to YouTube videos.

== Career ==
Before starting her first clothing brand, she worked in real estate in Baltimore. Upon her husband's trade to the San Francisco 49ers they relocated to San Jose. After having gone viral when singer Taylor Swift wore one of her custom designs to a Kansas City Chiefs game, Juszczyk was given a licensing deal by the NFL. Juszczyk started the brand, Off Season, with British entrepreneur Emma Grede. The brand is operated by Fanatics, Inc. and licensed by the NFL.

Juszczyk and former NFL quarterback Drew Brees worked with Verizon for its small business initiative.

https://www.usatoday.com/gcdn/authoring/authoring-images/2024/08/16/USAT/74827543007-usatsi-22500323.jpg?width=1086&height=798&fit=crop&format=pjpg&auto=webp

== Personal life ==
In July 2019, she married Kyle Juszczyk in New York.
