= 1984 Duke Blue Devils football team =

American college football season

1984 Duke Blue Devils football
- Conference: Atlantic Coast Conference
- Record: 2–9 (1–5 ACC)
- Head coach: Steve Sloan (2nd season)
- Offensive coordinator: John Cropp
- Defensive coordinator: Richard Bell (2nd season)
- MVP: Johnny Hill
- Captains: Johnny Hill; Scott Russell; Ron Sally
- Home stadium: Wallace Wade Stadium

1984 Atlantic Coast Conference football standings
	Conf.					Overall
Team	W		L		T	W		L		T
No. 12 Maryland $	5	–	0	–	0	9	–	3	–	0
No. 20 Virginia	3	–	1	–	2	8	–	2	–	2
North Carolina	3	–	2	–	1	5	–	5	–	1
Wake Forest	3	–	3	–	0	6	–	5	–	0
Georgia Tech	2	–	2	–	1	6	–	4	–	1
NC State	1	–	5	–	0	3	–	8	–	0
Duke	1	–	5	–	0	2	–	9	–	0
Clemson	0	–	0	–	0*	7	–	4	–	0
$ – Conference champion; * – Clemson was under NCAA and ACC probation and was ineligible for the ACC title. As a result, their ACC games did not count in the league standings.; Rankings from AP Poll

The 1984 Duke Blue Devils football team was an American football team that represented Duke University as a member of the Atlantic Coast Conference (ACC) during the 1984 NCAA Division I-A football season. In their second year under head coach Steve Sloan, the Blue Devils compiled an overall record of 2–9, with a conference record of 1–5, and finished seventh in the ACC.

== Schedule ==
Date	Opponent	Site	Result	Attendance	Source
September 8	Indiana*	Wallace Wade Stadium; Durham, NC	W 31–24	23,500	
September 22	at South Carolina*	Williams–Brice Stadium; Columbia, SC	L 0–21	68,300	
September 29	at Army*	Michie Stadium; West Point, NY	L 9–13	37,026	
October 6	Virginia	Wallace Wade Stadium; Durham, NC	L 10–38	17,200	
October 13	at Virginia Tech*	Lane Stadium; Blacksburg, VA	L 0–27	36,400	
October 20	at Clemson*^{A}	Memorial Stadium; Clemson, SC	L 21–54	80,500	
October 27	Maryland	Wallace Wade Stadium; Durham, NC	L 7–43	17,500	
November 3	at Georgia Tech	Grant Field; Atlanta, GA	L 3–31	36,393	
November 10	Wake Forest^{†}	Wallace Wade Stadium; Durham, NC (rivalry)	L 16–20	28,000	
November 17	at NC State	Carter–Finley Stadium; Raleigh, NC (rivalry)	W 16–13	35,200	
November 24	North Carolina	Wallace Wade Stadium; Durham, NC (Victory Bell)	L 15–17	31,200	
*Non-conference game; ^{†}Homecoming

A. Clemson was under NCAA probation, and was ineligible for the ACC title. Therefore this game did not count in the league standings.
