= 1985 All-Atlantic Coast Conference football team =

American college football all-star team

The 1985 All-Atlantic Coast Conference football team consists of American football players chosen by various selectors for their All-Atlantic Coast Conference ("ACC") teams for the 1985 NCAA Division I-A football season. Selectors in 1985 included the Associated Press (AP).

Four teams dominated the AP's 1985 All-ACC selections:

- Conference champion Maryland finished the season ranked No. 18 in the final AP Poll and placed four players on the All-ACC team: offensive lineman Len Lynch, defensive lineman Bruce Mesner, linebacker Chuck Faucette, and defensive back Al Covington
- Georgia Tech finished the season ranked No. 19 in the final AP Poll and placed three players on the All-ACC team: defensive lineman Pat Swilling, linebacker Ted Roof, and defensive back Cleve Pounds.

== Offensive selections ==
=== Wide receivers ===
- James Brim, Wake Forest (AP)
- Earl Winfield, North Carolina (AP)

=== Tight ends ===
- Jim Riggs, Clemson (AP)

=== Offensive linemen ===
- Jim Dombrowski, Virginia (AP)
- Joe Milinichik, NC State (AP)
- Len Lynch, Maryland (AP)
- Steve Reese, Clemson (AP)
- Harold Garren, Virginia (AP)

=== Quarterbacks ===
- Erik Kramer, NC State (AP)

=== Running backs ===
- Barry Word, Virginia (AP)
- Kenny Flowers, Clemson (AP)

== Defensive selections ==
=== Defensive linemen ===
- Bruce Mesner, Maryland (AP)
- Pat Swilling, Georgia Tech (AP)
- Reuben Davis, North Carolina (AP)
- Gary Baldinger, Wake Forest (AP)

=== Linebackers ===
- Chuck Faucette, Maryland (AP)
- Mike Junkin, Duke (AP)
- Ted Roof, Georgia Tech (AP)

=== Defensive backs ===
- Cleve Pounds, Georgia Tech (AP)
- Al Covington, Maryland (AP)
- Reggie McCummings, Wake Forest (AP)
- Larry Griffin, North Carolina (AP)

== Special teams ==
=== Placekickers ===
- Kenny Stadlin, Virginia (AP)

=== Punters ===
- Tommy Barnhardt, North Carolina (AP)

== Key ==
AP = Associated Press
