= 1984 NC State Wolfpack football team =

American college football season

1984 NC State Wolfpack football
- Conference: Atlantic Coast Conference
- Record: 3–8 (1–5 ACC)
- Head coach: Tom Reed (2nd season)
- Home stadium: Carter Stadium

1984 Atlantic Coast Conference football standings
	Conf.					Overall
Team	W		L		T	W		L		T
No. 12 Maryland $	5	–	0	–	0	9	–	3	–	0
No. 20 Virginia	3	–	1	–	2	8	–	2	–	2
North Carolina	3	–	2	–	1	5	–	5	–	1
Wake Forest	3	–	3	–	0	6	–	5	–	0
Georgia Tech	2	–	2	–	1	6	–	4	–	1
NC State	1	–	5	–	0	3	–	8	–	0
Duke	1	–	5	–	0	2	–	9	–	0
Clemson	0	–	0	–	0*	7	–	4	–	0
$ – Conference champion; * – Clemson was under NCAA and ACC probation and was ineligible for the ACC title. As a result, their ACC games did not count in the league standings.; Rankings from AP Poll

The 1984 NC State Wolfpack football team represented North Carolina State University during the 1984 NCAA Division I-A football season. The team's head coach was Tom Reed. NC State has been a member of the Atlantic Coast Conference (ACC) since the league's inception in 1953. The Wolfpack played its home games in 1984 at Carter–Finley Stadium in Raleigh, North Carolina, which has been NC State football's home stadium since 1966.

== Schedule ==
Date	Opponent	Site	Result	Attendance	Source
September 8	Ohio*	Carter–Finley Stadium; Raleigh, NC	W 43–6	40,800	
September 15	Furman*	Carter–Finley Stadium; Raleigh, NC	L 30–34	37,200	
September 22	Wake Forest	Carter–Finley Stadium; Raleigh, NC (rivalry)	L 15–24	34,300	
September 29	East Carolina*	Carter–Finley Stadium; Raleigh, NC (rivalry)	W 31–22	57,300	
October 6	at No. 12 Georgia Tech	Grant Field; Atlanta, GA	W 27–22	32,627	
October 13	at Maryland	Byrd Stadium; College Park, MD	L 21–44	43,450	
October 20	at North Carolina	Kenan Memorial Stadium; Chapel Hill, NC (rivalry)	L 21–28	50,600	
October 27	Clemson*^{A}	Carter–Finley Stadium; Raleigh, NC (Textile Bowl)	L 34–35	44,100	
November 3	No. 5 South Carolina*	Carter–Finley Stadium; Raleigh, NC	L 28–35	46,200	
November 10	at Virginia	Scott Stadium; Charlottesville, VA	L 0–45	43,379	
November 17	Duke	Carter–Finley Stadium; Raleigh, NC (rivalry)	L 13–16	35,200	
*Non-conference game; Rankings from AP Poll released prior to the game

Clemson was under NCAA probation, and was ineligible for the ACC title. Therefore, this game did not count in the league standings.
