= 1984 Maryland Terrapins football team =

American college football season

1984 Maryland Terrapins football

ACC champion Sun Bowl champion

Sun Bowl, W 28–27 vs. Tennessee
- Conference: Atlantic Coast Conference

Ranking
- Coaches: No. 11
- AP: No. 12
- Record: 9–3 (5–0 ACC)
- Head coach: Bobby Ross (3rd season)
- Offensive coordinator: Ralph Friedgen (3rd season)
- Offensive scheme: Multiple
- Defensive coordinator: Gib Romaine (3rd season)
- Base defense: Wide-Tackle Six
- Home stadium: Byrd Stadium

1984 Atlantic Coast Conference football standings
| | Conf. | | | | | Overall |
| Team | W | | L | | T | W | | L | | T |
|---|---|---|---|---|---|---|---|---|---|---|
| No. 12 Maryland $ | 5 | – | 0 | – | 0 | 9 | – | 3 | – | 0 |
| No. 20 Virginia | 3 | – | 1 | – | 2 | 8 | – | 2 | – | 2 |
| North Carolina | 3 | – | 2 | – | 1 | 5 | – | 5 | – | 1 |
| Wake Forest | 3 | – | 3 | – | 0 | 6 | – | 5 | – | 0 |
| Georgia Tech | 2 | – | 2 | – | 1 | 6 | – | 4 | – | 1 |
| NC State | 1 | – | 5 | – | 0 | 3 | – | 8 | – | 0 |
| Duke | 1 | – | 5 | – | 0 | 2 | – | 9 | – | 0 |
| Clemson | 0 | – | 0 | – | 0* | 7 | – | 4 | – | 0 |
$ – Conference champion; * – Clemson was under NCAA and ACC probation and was ineligible for the ACC title. As a result, their ACC games did not count in the league standings.; Rankings from AP Poll

The 1984 Maryland Terrapins football team represented the University of Maryland, College Park in the 1984 NCAA Division I-A football season. The Terrapins won the Atlantic Coast Conference (ACC) for the second consecutive season.

== Schedule ==
| Date | Opponent | Rank | Site | TV | Result | Attendance | Source |
|---|---|---|---|---|---|---|---|
| September 8 | Syracuse* | | Byrd Stadium; College Park, MD | JPT | L 7–23 | 38,850 | |
| September 15 | Vanderbilt* | | Byrd Stadium; College Park, MD | | L 14–23 | 34,100 | |
| September 22 | at No. 18 West Virginia* | | Mountaineer Field; Morgantown, WV (rivalry) | | W 20–17 | 58,353 | |
| September 29 | Wake Forest | | Byrd Stadium; College Park, MD | | W 38–17 | 32,700 | |
| October 6 | at No. 11 Penn State* | | Beaver Stadium; University Park, PA (rivalry) | TCS/MetroSports | L 24–25 | 85,456 | |
| October 13 | NC State^{†} | | Byrd Stadium; College Park, MD | | W 44–21 | 43,450 | |
| October 27 | at Duke | | Wallace Wade Stadium; Durham, NC | | W 43–7 | 17,500 | |
| November 3 | at North Carolina | | Kenan Memorial Stadium; Chapel Hill, NC | | W 34–23 | 48,000 | |
| November 10 | at No. 6 Miami (FL)* | | Miami Orange Bowl; Miami, FL | JPT/USA | W 42–40 | 31,548 | |
| November 17 | No. 20 Clemson*^{A} | | Memorial Stadium; Baltimore, MD | | W 41–23 | 60,575 | |
| November 24 | at Virginia | No. 18 | Scott Stadium; Charlottesville, VA (rivalry) | | W 45–34 | 43,017 | |
| December 22 | vs. Tennessee* | No. 12 | Sun Bowl; El Paso, TX (Sun Bowl) | CBS | W 28–27 | 50,126 | |
*Non-conference game; ^{†}Homecoming; Rankings from AP Poll released prior to the game

A. Clemson was under NCAA probation, and was ineligible for the ACC title. Therefore this game did not count in the league standings.

== Games summaries ==
=== Miami (FL) ===
Maryland at #6 Miami (FL)

| Team | 1 | 2 | 3 | 4 | Total |
|---|---|---|---|---|---|
| • Terrapins | 0 | 0 | 21 | 21 | 42 |
| Hurricanes | 7 | 24 | 3 | 6 | 40 |

- Date: November 10
- Location: Orange Bowl
- Game attendance: 31,548
- Game weather: 80 °F (27 °C), Partly sunny, Wind NE 9 mph (14 km/h)
- TV announcers (JP): Mike Patrick, Kevin Kiley, and Chris Clackum

Scoring summary
| Q1 | 3:51 | MIA | Bernie Kosar 1-yard run (Cox kick) | MIA 7–0 |
| Q2 | | MIA | Willie Smith 7-yard pass from Bernie Kosar (Cox kick) | MIA 14–0 |
| Q2 | | MIA | Willie Smith 11-yard pass from Bernie Kosar (Cox kick) | MIA 21–0 |
| Q2 | 1:03 | MIA | Greg Cox 48-yard field goal | MIA 24–0 |
| Q2 | 0:12 | MIA | Charles Henry 1-yard pass from Bernie Kosar (Cox kick) | MIA 31–0 |
| Q3 | 12:35 | MD | Greg Hill 39-yard pass from Frank Reich (Atkinson kick) | MIA 31–7 |
| Q3 | 6:53 | MD | Frank Reich 1-yard run (Atkinson kick) | MIA 31–14 |
| Q3 | 5:08 | MIA | Greg Cox 19-yard field goal | MIA 34–14 |
| Q3 | | MD | Alvin Blount 1-yard pass from Frank Reich (Atkinson kick) | MIA 34–21 |
| Q4 | 9:20 | MD | Tommy Neal 20-yard run (Atkinson kick) | MIA 34–28 |
| Q4 | 5:29 | MD | Greg Hill 68-yard pass from Frank Reich (Atkinson kick) | MD 35–34 |
| Q4 | 9:20 | MD | Rick Badanjek 4-yard run (Atkinson kick) | MD 42–34 |
| Q2 | 1:00 | MIA | Eddie Brown 5-yard pass from Bernie Kosar (pass failed) | MD 42–40 |

The biggest highlight of the season was Frank Reich's comeback against the defending national champion Miami Hurricanes on November 10, 1984, at the Orange Bowl Stadium. Reich came off the bench to play for Stan Gelbaugh, who had previously replaced him as the starter after Reich separated his shoulder in the fourth week of the season against Wake Forest. Miami quarterback Bernie Kosar led the 'Canes to a 31–0 lead at halftime. At the start of the third quarter, Reich led the Terrapins on a scoring drive after scoring drive. Three touchdowns in the third quarter and a fourth at the start of the final quarter turned what was a blowout into a close game. With the score 34–28 Miami, Reich hit Greg Hill with a 68-yard touchdown pass which deflected off the hands of Miami safety Darrell Fullington to take the lead. Maryland scored once more to cap an incredible 42–9 second half, and won the game 42–40, completing what was then the biggest comeback in NCAA history.

== Roster ==
1984 Maryland Terrapins football team roster
Players
Coaches
Offense

| Pos. | # | Name | Class |
|---|---|---|---|
| RB | 33 | Alvin Blount | So |
| QB | 8 | Stan Gelbaugh | Jr |
| C | 70 | Kevin Glover | Sr |
| OT | 73 | J. D. Maarleveld | Jr |
| QB | 14 | Frank Reich | Sr |

Defense

| Pos. | # | Name | Class |
|---|---|---|---|
| LB | 55 | Eric Wilson | Sr |

Special teams

| Pos. | # | Name | Class |
|---|---|---|---|
| K | 90 | Jess Atkinson | Sr |

Head coach

- Bobby Ross

Coordinators/assistant coaches

Legend

- (C) Team captain
- (S) Suspended
- (I) Ineligible
- Injured
- Redshirt

== 1984 Terrapins in professional football ==
| Player | Position | Round | Pick | Team |
| Kevin Glover | Center | 2 | 34 | Detroit Lions |
| Frank Reich | Quarterback | 3 | 57 | Buffalo Bills |
| Eric Wilson | Linebacker | 7 | 171 | Green Bay Packers |

Stan Gelbaugh played for the Saskatchewan Roughriders in 1986 and then in the NFL for the Buffalo Bills, Phoenix Cardinals, and Seattle Seahawks.
