= 1983 All-Atlantic Coast Conference football team =

American college football all-star team

The 1983 All-Atlantic Coast Conference football team consists of American football players chosen by various selectors for their All-Atlantic Coast Conference ("ACC") teams for the 1983 college football season. Selectors in 1983 included the Associated Press (AP).

== Offensive selections ==
=== Wide receivers ===
- Mike Militello, Duke (AP)
- Mark Smith, North Carolina (AP)

=== Tackles ===
- Brian Blados, North Carolina (AP)
- Joe Milinichik, NC State (AP)

=== Guards ===
- Ron Solt, Maryland (AP)
- Jamie Farr, Clemson (AP)

=== Centers ===
- Philip Ebinger, Duke (AP)

=== Tight ends ===
- Scott Russell, Duke (AP)

=== Quarterbacks ===
- Ben Bennett, Duke (AP)

=== Running backs ===
- Mike Grayson, Duke (AP)
- Ethan Horton, North Carolina (AP)

== Defensive selections ==
=== Defensive linemen ===
- William Fuller, North Carolina (AP)
- William Perry, Clemson (AP)
- James Robinson, Clemson (AP)
- Pete Koch, Maryland (AP)

=== Linebackers ===
- Eric Wilson, Maryland (AP)
- Vaughan Johnson, NC State (AP)
- Henry Walls, Clemson (AP)

=== Defensive backs ===
- Lester Lyles, Virginia (AP)
- Willie Harris, North Carolina (AP)
- Clarence Baldwin, Maryland (AP)
- Rod McSwain, Clemson (AP)

== Special teams ==
=== Placekickers ===
- Jess Atkinson, Maryland (AP)

=== Punters ===
- Harry Newsome, Wake Forest (AP)

== Key ==
AP = Associated Press

== See also ==
1983 College Football All-America Team
