= Brian Baldinger =

American football player and analyst (born 1959)

No. 62
- Position: Guard

Personal information
- Born: January 7, 1959 (age 67); Pittsburgh, Pennsylvania, U.S.
- Listed height: 6 ft 4 in (1.93 m)
- Listed weight: 255 lb (116 kg)

Career information
- High school: Massapequa (Massapequa, New York)
- College: Duke
- NFL draft: 1982: undrafted

Career history
- Dallas Cowboys (1982–1987); Indianapolis Colts (1988–1991); Buffalo Bills (1992)*; Philadelphia Eagles (1992–1993)
- * Offseason or practice squad member only

Career NFL statistics
- Games played: 143
- Games started: 47
- Fumble recoveries: 2
- Stats at Pro Football Reference

Brian David Baldinger (born January 7, 1959) is an American former professional football player who was a guard in the National Football League (NFL) for the Dallas Cowboys, Indianapolis Colts, and Philadelphia Eagles. He currently works for NFL Network, where he serves as an analyst for the television show NFL Total Access. Baldinger played college football for the Duke Blue Devils. He also serves as lead analyst for Compass Media Networks.

== Early life and college ==
Baldinger was born in Pittsburgh, Pennsylvania. He spent much of his youth playing a variety of sports in and around Cherry Hill, New Jersey, in suburban Philadelphia.

His family later moved to Apple Valley, Minnesota, and then Massapequa, New York, where he and his brothers continued to excel in sports. Brian played football, basketball and track at Massapequa High School, where his graduating class in 1977 included Jessica Hahn, Brian Setzer, and Tim Van Patten.

After high school, he was planning to study at the Naval Academy Preparatory School, but his application was mismanaged. He instead chose to attend Nassau Community College, where he played football and basketball. He was named the starter at tight end and on October 13, 1978, set a school record with seven receptions in a single game against Wesley College. He finished the season with 38 receptions (ranked third in the conference) for 334 yards and one touchdown. He received All-Coastal Conference honors and played in the Coastal Conference All-Star Game.

In 1979, he transferred to Duke University. As a sophomore, he was a backup tight end before being converted into an offensive guard because of his blocking ability.

As a junior in 1980, he was named the starter at right guard but missed games with a knee injury. As a senior in 1981, he was voted the team's most improved player and started all 11 games as the Blue Devils finished 6–5, the program's best record in seven years.

== Professional career ==
=== Dallas Cowboys ===
Baldinger was signed as an undrafted free agent by the Dallas Cowboys after the 1982 NFL draft on April 30. In training camp, he was tried at center, guard and tackle. As a rookie, he appeared in 4 out of 9 games, playing mostly on special teams. In 1983, he saw playing time as a backup at center and guard.

In 1984, he started two games at right tackle replacing an injured Phil Pozderac, and also started 2 games at right guard in place of an injured Kurt Petersen. In 1985, he injured his right knee in the third preseason game against the Chicago Bears and was placed on the injured reserve list.

In 1986, he was a backup at center and also played as a third tight end in short-yardage situations. On September 2, 1987, he was placed on the injured reserve list with a left knee injury he suffered in a preseason game. On October 24, he was activated to the regular season roster. He was declared inactive in 6 of the final 8 games.

Baldinger wasn't re-signed after the season. During his time with the Cowboys, he played every offensive line position and also had a few snaps at tight end.

=== Indianapolis Colts ===
On July 19, 1988, he was signed as a free agent by the Indianapolis Colts, to provide depth in the case of a lengthy contract holdout by guard Ron Solt. He was the lightest member of the offensive line. He appeared in 16 games, starting three contests at right tackle. He caught his first career pass (37 yards) from a tackle-eligible position against the Green Bay Packers.

In 1989, he appeared in all 16 games. He started the season opener at right tackle in place of Kevin Call and started 2 games at left tackle in place of an injured Chris Hinton. He also was used as tackle-eligible in short yardage situations.

In 1990, he was named the starter at right guard for the first 8 games. In the second half of the season, he was moved to replace right tackle Call, who injured his left shoulder in the eighth game against the New York Giants.

In 1991, he started 13 games at center in place of Ray Donaldson, who was lost for the season with a broken leg he suffered against the Los Angeles Raiders.

=== Buffalo Bills ===
On April 2, 1992, he was signed in Plan B free agency by the Buffalo Bills, joining his brother Gary Baldinger. He was released on August 31.

=== Philadelphia Eagles ===
On September 28, 1992, he was signed as a free agent by the Philadelphia Eagles to replace an injured John Hudson. In 1993, he started 4 games at right guard in place of an injured Eric Floyd. On June 4, 1994, he was released in a salary cap move, along with 11 other veterans.

== Broadcasting career ==
Baldinger began his broadcasting career as a color analyst at Bucknell University in Lewisburg, Pennsylvania, in 1995, and then moved to Fox in 1997, providing analysis for NFL Europe games. The network was impressed with his soothing voice and handy repertoire of clichés, and promoted him to a color commentary slot for NFL games. Baldinger worked alongside play-by-play voices Ray Bentley, Curt Menefee, Joe Buck, Pat Summerall, Kenny Albert, and Dick Stockton.

In May 2009, it was reported that Baldinger would be replaced by former NFL safety John Lynch on Fox's telecasts. Shortly thereafter, Baldinger was hired by Compass Media Networks to serve as lead analyst for their national radio broadcasts of select Sunday afternoon NFL games.

In 2010, He served as offensive line coach during the season for the Bergamo Lions in the Italian Football League. The quarterback on the team was Bradlee Van Pelt.

Baldinger also co-hosts a talk show for Sporting News Radio during football season, and teaches seminars for Nadia Communications. He is the author of the book The Map to Clear Messages.

Baldinger has previously co-hosted various radio shows, and now is a frequent contributor for a sports-talk radio show for Philadelphia's WPEN, as well as NFL Network and Sky Sports.

In October 2016, during an appearance on WPEN ahead of a Sunday Night Game between the Eagles and Cowboys, Baldinger said that the Eagles should put a bounty on then-rookie running back Ezekiel Elliott. A few days later, NFL Network suspended Baldinger without pay for 6 months, but later reduced his suspension and he returned to NFLN in April 2017.

== Personal life ==
A resident of Fort Lauderdale, Florida, he has two younger brothers, Rich and Gary, who also played in the National Football League. Baldinger frequently works at The NFL Network in Mount Laurel, New Jersey. He has a slightly mutilated right pinky finger that was injured when it became entangled in the jersey of Randy White.
