= Rich Baldinger =

American football player (born 1959)

No. 74, 77
- Positions: Guard, Tackle

Personal information
- Born: December 31, 1959 (age 66); Camp Lejeune, North Carolina, U.S.
- Listed height: 6 ft 4 in (1.93 m)
- Listed weight: 285 lb (129 kg)

Career information
- High school: Massapequa (Massapequa, New York)
- College: Wake Forest
- NFL draft: 1982: 10th round, 270th overall pick

Career history
- New York Giants (1982–1983); Kansas City Chiefs (1983-1992); New England Patriots (1993)

Career NFL statistics
- Games played: 157
- Games started: 107
- Fumble recoveries: 4
- Stats at Pro Football Reference

Richard L. Baldinger (born December 31, 1959) is an American former professional football player who was an offensive lineman for 12 seasons in the National Football League (NFL), primarily for the Kansas City Chiefs. He played college football for the Wake Forest Demon Deacons. Since retiring as a player, Baldinger has served as a color commentator for CBS from 2004 to 2006 and the Big Ten Network in 2007.

His younger brother Gary Baldinger was his teammate with the Chiefs and also played at Wake Forest. His other brother Brian Baldinger also played in the NFL and was a commentator for Fox.

Like his brothers, he graduated from Massapequa High School.

== See also ==
- History of the New York Giants (1979-1993)
