= Chuck Faucette =

American gridiron football player and coach (born 1963)

No. 57, 53
- Position: Linebacker

Personal information
- Born: October 7, 1963 (age 63); Levittown, Pennsylvania, U.S.
- Listed height: 6 ft 3 in (1.91 m)
- Listed weight: 242 lb (110 kg)

Career information
- High school: Willingboro (Willingboro Township, New Jersey)
- College: Maryland
- NFL draft: 1987: 10th round, 279th overall pick

Career history
- New York Giants (1987)*; San Diego Chargers (1987–1988)
- * Offseason or practice squad member only

Awards and highlights
- 2× First-team All-ACC (1985, 1986)

Career NFL statistics
- Interceptions: 1
- Fumble recoveries: 1
- Stats at Pro Football Reference

Charles Faucette, Jr. (born October 7, 1963) is an American former professional football linebacker and former St. Louis Rams strength and conditioning coach. He played two seasons for the San Diego Chargers, appearing in ten games. He worked as teacher at Ida S. Baker High School in Cape Coral, Florida and later left.

== Early life ==
Raised in Willingboro Township, New Jersey, Faucette played both baseball and football at Willingboro High School.

== Toronto Blue Jays ==
Faucette was originally drafted in the 12th round (290th pick) out of high school to play baseball for the Toronto Blue Jays. In 1981, at 17, he played outfield for their rookie-league team in Bradenton, Florida. In 1982, he played in Florence, South Carolina and Medicine Hat, Alberta before going to play college football for the University of Maryland. In two seasons in the Jays' farm system, Faucette batted .151 with four home runs and sixteen runs batted in.

== University of Maryland ==
Faucette attended the University of Maryland, College Park from 1983 to 1986 and left as the Terrapins second-leading all-time tackler with 466, behind only Eric Wilson (481). As of June 2009, Faucette still ranks third on Maryland's all-time list, only behind Wilson and D'Qwell Jackson (473). Faucette helped the Terrapins to three-straight Atlantic Coast Conference championships (1983–85), serving as team captain in his senior year. He was a two-time All-ACC selection and a three-time honorable mention All-American.

== NFL career ==
At 6 ft 3 in (1.91 m) and 240 lb (110 kg), Faucette had a prototypical physique. However, due to the unusual college defense in which he played, a wide-tackle-six, pro teams were not sure how he would fit into their more standard 3-4 or 4-3 defenses. He was drafted in the tenth round of the 1987 NFL draft (279th overall) by the New York Giants.

The reigning Super Bowl champions boasted veteran stars Lawrence Taylor, Harry Carson and Carl Banks at line backer, and Faucette was cut during preseason. He caught on with the San Diego Chargers, and made his NFL debut in week four against the Cincinnati Bengals.

== Post NFL career ==
After two seasons with the Chargers, he retired from the NFL after he suffered a broken neck, and started his coaching career as the head coach at Crawford High School in San Diego in 1990. Faucette went on to coach the linebackers for the Hamilton Tiger-Cats of the Canadian Football League from 1990 to 1992, alongside serving as the team's head strength coach. Between 1996 and 1999, he served as the boys' athletic director and head football coach at St. Pius X High School in Houston, Texas, leading his team to a 10–3 record and a state runner-up finish in 1998.

Entering the collegiate level, Faucette became an assistant strength & conditioning coach at Texas in 1999. He left for Southern Methodist University after two seasons to become the Mustangs' head strength & conditioning coach. Faucette returned to the Longhorns for a second stint in 2006–07. In 2008, he was hired by the St. Louis Rams as strength and conditioning coach. In June 2008, Faucette received the highest honor from the Collegiate Strength and Conditioning Coaches association (CSCCa) as he was named Master Strength and Conditioning coach. On February 5, he was retained by new Rams head coach Steve Spagnuolo. On January 7, 2010, Coach Spagnuolo elected not to renew his contract He was the head coach from 2010 to 2016 at Lutheran High School South in St. Louis. On February 26, 2016, out of a candidate pool of over 150 coaches, Bishop Lynch High School in Dallas, Texas named Faucette as its Head Football Coach. In his first season, Faucette led Bishop Lynch to the 2016 TAPPS Division I state championship, the school's first football state title since 2003.

His daughter, Juliann, is a Professional volleyball player, attended the University of Texas, and was a three time All-America. His brother Patrick Faucette is an actor.
