= 1984 Peach Bowl =

- 17th Peach Bowl
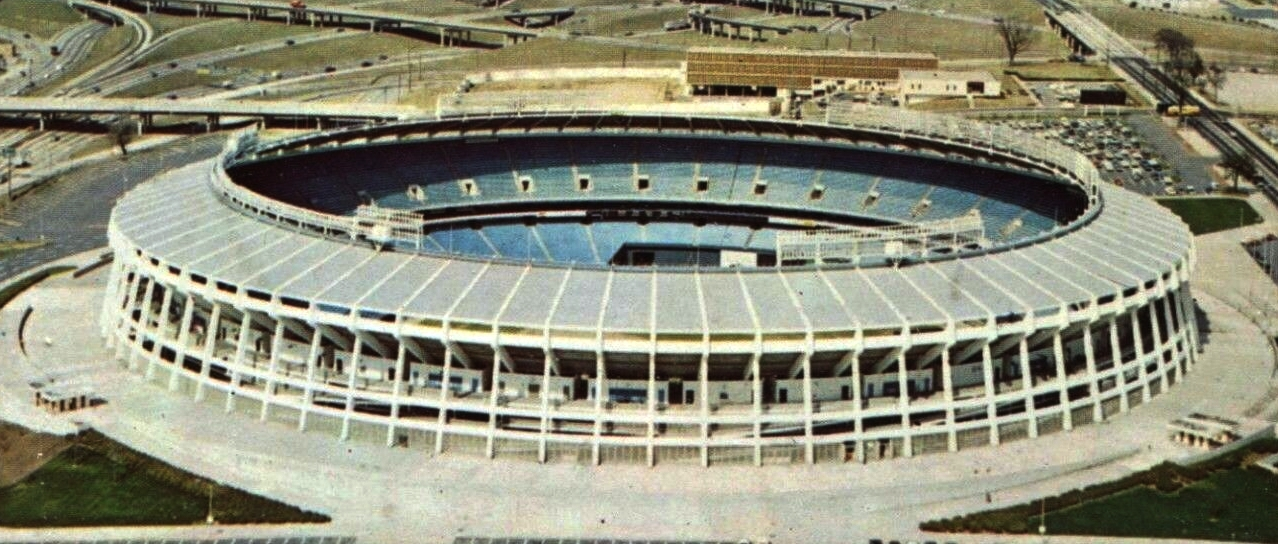
- Atlanta–Fulton County Stadium in Atlanta, Georgia, hosted the Peach Bowl.
Purdue Boilermakers	Virginia Cavaliers
(7–4)	(7–2–2)
Big Ten	ACC
24	27
Head coach: Leon Burtnett	Head coach: George Welsh
AP / Coaches; NR / NR	AP / Coaches; NR / NR
	1	2	3	4	Total
Purdue	10	14	0	0	24
Virginia	7	7	7	6	27
- Date: December 31, 1984
- Season: 1984
- Stadium: Atlanta–Fulton County Stadium
- Location: Atlanta, Georgia
- MVP: Offensive: Howard Petty, Virginia; Defensive: Ray Daly, Virginia
- Referee: Tommy Miller (SICOA)
- Attendance: 41,107

United States TV coverage
- Network: CBS
- Announcers: Verne Lundquist and Steve Davis

The 1984 Peach Bowl featured the Purdue Boilermakers of the Big Ten against the Virginia Cavaliers of the ACC. Virginia defeated Purdue 27–24 in the first bowl game in school history.

Purdue jumped out to a 24–14 halftime lead, but Virginia scored the only points of the second half with a touchdown and two field goals in order to pull out the win. Purdue quarterback Jim Everett passed for 253 yards and three touchdowns, but the Boilermakers gained just 75 yards rushing and committed four turnovers in their first bowl loss. Purdue finished the season 7–5 and tied for second place in the Big Ten. Virginia finished 8–2–2.
