= Kyle Juszczyk =

American football player (born 1991)

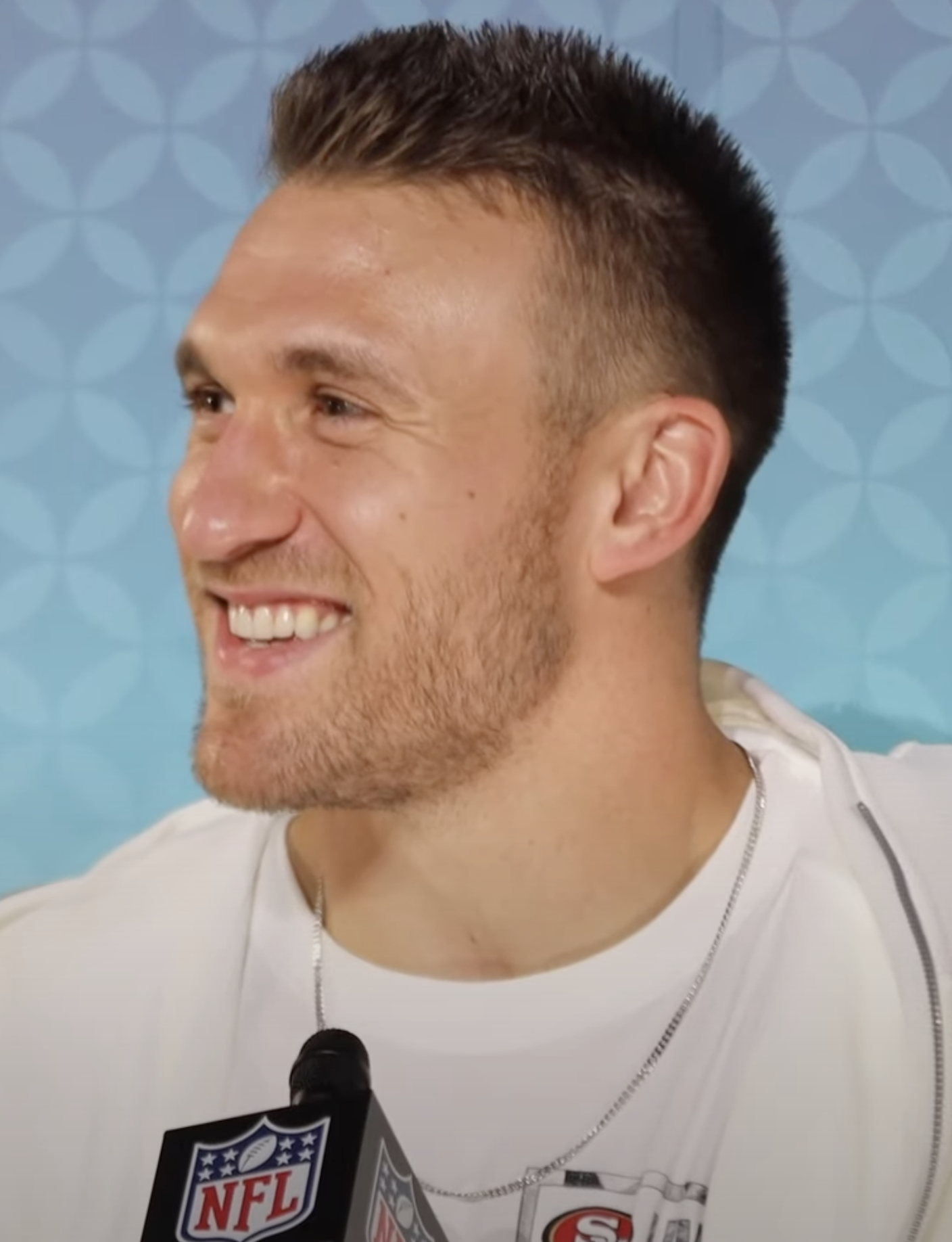
- Juszczyk in 2020

No. 44 – San Francisco 49ers
- Position: Fullback
- Roster status: Active

Personal information
- Born: April 23, 1991 (age 35); Medina, Ohio, U.S.
- Listed height: 6 ft 2 in (1.88 m)
- Listed weight: 235 lb (107 kg)

Career information
- High school: Cloverleaf (Lodi, Ohio)
- College: Harvard (2009–2012)
- NFL draft: 2013: 4th round, 130th overall pick

Career history
- Baltimore Ravens (2013–2016); San Francisco 49ers (2017–present)

Awards and highlights
- 2× First-team All-Pro (2023, 2025); Second-team All-Pro (2024); 10× Pro Bowl (2016–2025); 2× First-team All-Ivy (2011, 2012)

Career NFL statistics as of Week 10, 2026
- Rushing yards: 238
- Rushing average: 3.4
- Rushing touchdowns: 6
- Receptions: 313
- Receiving yards: 2,953
- Receiving touchdowns: 22
- Stats at Pro Football Reference

Kyle Patrick Juszczyk (/ˈjuːstʃɛk/ YOOSS-chek; born April 23, 1991) is an American professional football fullback for the San Francisco 49ers of the National Football League (NFL). He played college football for the Harvard Crimson and was selected by the Baltimore Ravens in the fourth round of the 2013 NFL draft.

Juszczyk is the first Harvard alumnus ever to score a touchdown in a Super Bowl, doing so in Super Bowl LIV. Juszczyk also notably holds the record for signing the two largest contracts in NFL history given to a fullback, with the initial contract he signed with the 49ers in 2017 becoming the largest at that time, which was later surpassed by the subsequent extension he signed in 2021.

== Early life ==
Juszczyk was born in Medina, Ohio. He attended Cloverleaf High School in Lodi, Ohio, and played high school football for the Cloverleaf Colts as a tight end. Juszczyk also participated in track and field, where he was a Suburban League champion in the shot put.

== College career ==
Juszczyk attended Harvard University, where he played tight end for the Crimson under coach Tim Murphy. Juszczyk played for the Crimson from 2009 to 2012. Following his senior season in 2012, Juszczyk was a unanimous first-team All-Ivy League selection.

Juszczyk finished his collegiate career with 125 receptions for 1,576 yards and 22 touchdowns.

== Professional career ==
=== Pre-draft ===
Coming out of Harvard, many analysts and scouts projected Juszczyk to be a third or fourth round pick. NFLDraftscout.com ranked him the best fullback out of the 94 available. Although he was not invited to the NFL Combine, Juszczyk performed all the required drills and positional workouts at Harvard's Pro Day.

Pre-draft measurables
Height	Weight	Arm length	Hand span	Wingspan	40-yard dash	10-yard split	20-yard split	20-yard shuttle	Three-cone drill	Vertical jump	Broad jump	Bench press
6 ft 1 1/4 in (1.86 m)	248 lb (112 kg)	32 5/8 in (0.83 m)	9 1/8 in (0.23 m)	6 ft 3 7/8 in (1.93 m)	4.71 s	1.60 s	2.75 s	4.19 s	6.93 s	37 in (0.94 m)	10 ft 1 in (3.07 m)	24 reps
All values from Harvard's Pro Day

=== Baltimore Ravens ===
==== 2013 season ====
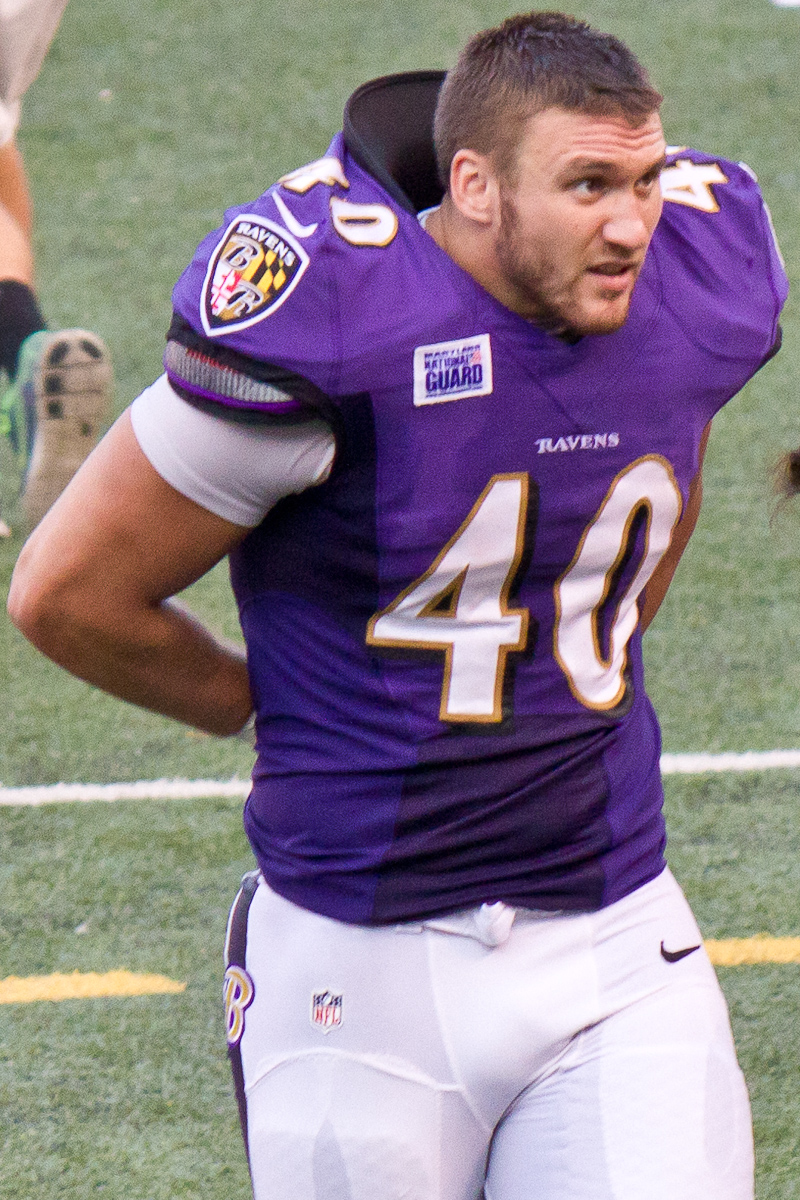
Juszczyk in 2013

The Baltimore Ravens chose Juszczyk in the fourth round (130th overall) of the 2013 NFL draft. He was the first fullback selected of the three chosen in the 2013 NFL draft. Juszczyk became the first fullback drafted from Harvard and only the tenth player in school history to be drafted. He was the second highest selection in school history, only behind Isaiah Kacyvenski, who was selected in the fourth round (119th overall) in the 2000 NFL draft.

On May 2, 2013, the Ravens signed Juszczyk to a four-year, $2.46 million contract that included a signing bonus of $300,574.

Juszczyk entered training camp his rookie year competing with veteran Vonta Leach to be the Raven's starting fullback. Juszczyk was named Leach's backup to begin the regular season. He made his professional regular season debut in the Ravens' season-opening 49–27 loss to the Denver Broncos. Throughout his rookie season, Juszczyk appeared in all 16 regular season games but was used mainly on special teams and as a blocking fullback.

==== 2014 season ====
The following year, Juszczyk became the Ravens' starting fullback with the release of Vonta Leach in February. He also switched his jersey number from #40 to #44, which Juszczyk had worn at Harvard and Leach had worn the season before. He earned his first career start in the Ravens' season-opening loss to the Cincinnati Bengals.

On September 21, 2014, Juszczyk caught three passes for a season-high 54 receiving yards and caught his first career touchdown reception during a narrow 23–21 loss to the Cleveland Browns. His first career reception was a nine-yard touchdown pass from Joe Flacco. During Week 10 against the Tennessee Titans, Juszczyk caught a season-high three passes for 26 yards in the 21–7 victory. Juszczyk finished the season with 19 receptions for 182 yards and a touchdown while starting 14 games and appearing in all 16 games. He was named a Pro Bowl alternate at fullback after the 2014 season.

==== 2015 season ====
Juszczyk returned as the starting fullback in 2015 after winning the job over Kiero Small in training camp. In the season-opener against the Broncos, Juszczyk had four receptions for 17 yards. On October 11, 2015, he caught three passes for 31 receiving yards and caught his first touchdown of the season, on an eight-yard pass from Joe Flacco, as the Ravens lost 33–30 to the Browns. During a Week 10 loss to the Jacksonville Jaguars, he made a season-high five receptions for 47 yards. The next game, he caught three passes for 10 yards and had his first two career carries for three yards during Baltimore's 16–13 victory over the St. Louis Rams. On December 27, 2015, Juszczyk caught five passes for a season-high 55 yards as the Ravens defeated the Pittsburgh Steelers 20–17.

Juszczyk finished the 2015 season with career-highs in receptions (42), receiving yards (321), and receiving touchdowns (4). He only had two rushing attempts for three yards in 16 games and 11 starts.

==== 2016 season ====
Entering the regular season in 2016, Juszczyk was the Ravens' starter at fullback and was one of only 17 full-time fullbacks to play in 2016.

On September 11, 2016, in the season opener against the Buffalo Bills, he caught two passes for 22 yards and had one carry for two yards as the Ravens won 13–7. Three weeks later, Juszczyk caught a career-high six passes for 56 yards as the Ravens lost to the Oakland Raiders 28–27. On December 25, 2016, Juszczyk scored his first career rushing touchdown against the Steelers on Christmas Day. He finished the 27–31 loss to the Steelers with two carries for 15 yards and the aforementioned touchdown while catching two passes for 10 yards. The Ravens were eliminated from playoff contention with the loss.

On January 20, 2017, it was announced that Juszczyk was elected as an original selection to his first Pro Bowl. Pro Football Focus ranked him as the top fullback for 2016. Juszczyk played the most snaps of any fullback in 2016, finishing with 465, which was 115 more than any other fullback.

=== San Francisco 49ers ===
Juszczyk entered free agency for the first time in his career in 2017 and was the top fullback on the market. He received interest and offers from multiple teams, including the Philadelphia Eagles, Browns, Bills, and the San Francisco 49ers. The Eagles were the top team to possibly land the prized free agent at first, but the Bills overtook them as the favorite, as they were looking for a stable replacement for Jerome Felton.

==== 2017 season ====
On March 9, 2017, the 49ers signed Juszczyk to a four-year, $21 million contract that included $7 million guaranteed and a signing bonus of $5 million. It was the largest contract for a fullback in NFL history.

In his 49ers debut, Juszczyk had two receptions for 17 yards in the season-opening 23–3 loss to the Carolina Panthers. On December 19, 2017, he was named to his second Pro Bowl.

Juszczyk finished his first season with the 49ers tallying 33 receptions for 315 yards and a touchdown to go along with 31 rushing yards.

==== 2018 season ====
In the 2018 season opener against the Minnesota Vikings, Juszczyk recorded a 56-yard reception in the 24–16 loss. During Week 3 against the Kansas City Chiefs, he scored his first touchdown of the season on a 35-yard pass from Jimmy Garoppolo. Juszczyk was named to his third Pro Bowl for his accomplishments in the 2018 season.

Juszczyk finished the 2018 season with 30 receptions for 324 yards and a touchdown along with 30 rushing yards.

==== 2019 season ====
In the 2019 season, Juszczyk appeared in 12 games and recorded 20 receptions for 239 yards and a touchdown. He was named to his fourth Pro Bowl.

During Super Bowl LIV against the Chiefs, Juszczyk caught three passes for 39 yards and a touchdown in the 31–20 loss. His touchdown reception in the game was the first by a Harvard alumnus in Super Bowl history, and the first by a fullback since Mike Alstott in Super Bowl XXXVII.

==== 2020 season ====
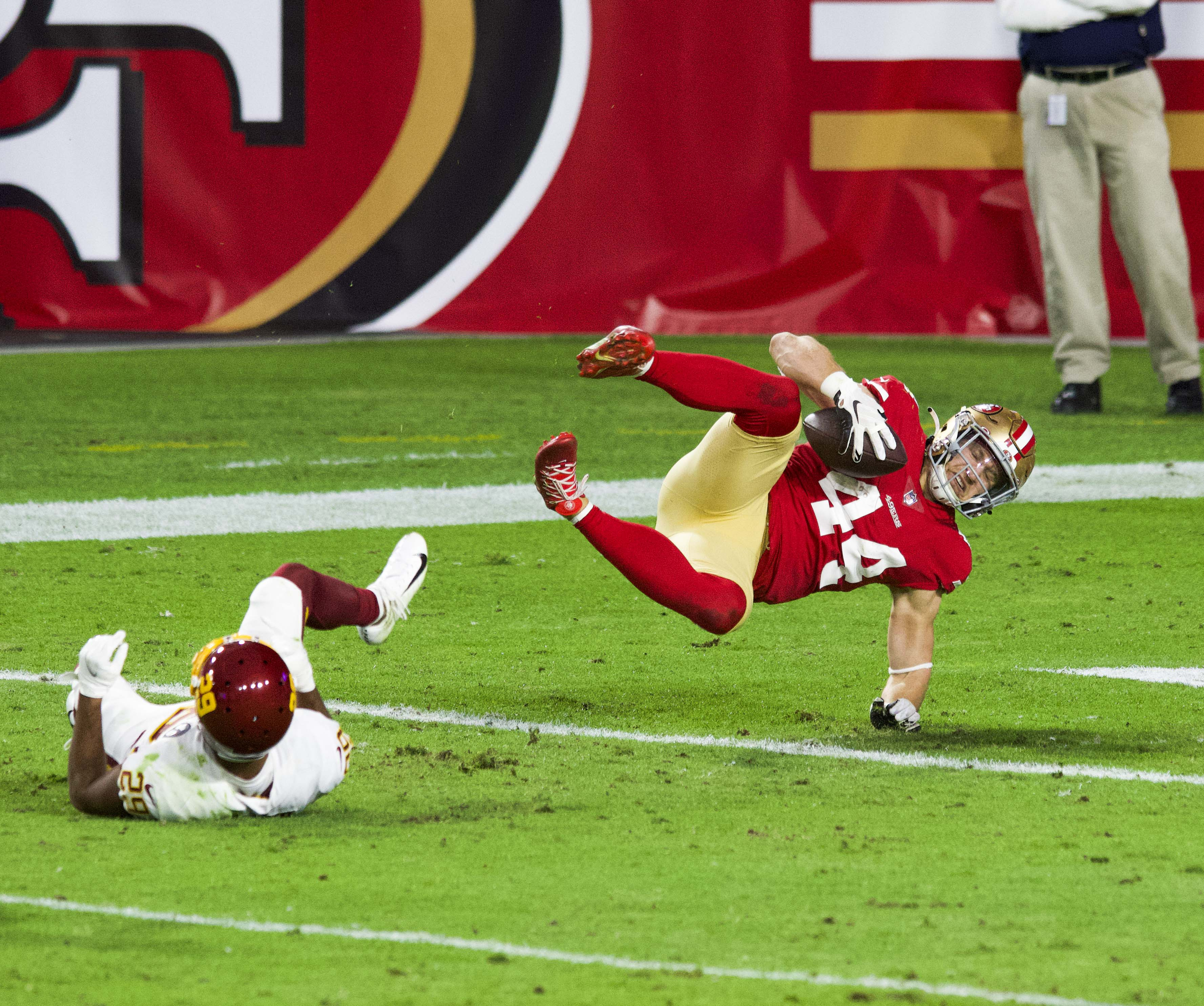
Juszczyk (right) in 2020

During Week 16 against the Arizona Cardinals, Juszczyk recorded two receiving touchdowns in the 20–12 road victory. He finished the 2020 season with 19 receptions for 202 yards and four touchdowns to go along with 17 carries for 64 yards and two touchdowns. For the fifth consecutive season, Juszczyk was named to the Pro Bowl. He was ranked 97th by his fellow players on the NFL Top 100 Players of 2021.

==== 2021 season ====
On March 15, 2021, Juszczyk signed a five-year contract extension with the 49ers worth $27 million. He recorded 30 receptions for 296 yards and a touchdown to go along with a rushing touchdown in the 2021 season. For the sixth consecutive season, Juszczyk earned a Pro Bowl nomination. He was ranked 100th by his fellow players on the NFL Top 100 Players of 2022.

==== 2022 season ====
During the 2022 season, Juszczyk recorded 19 receptions for 200 yards and a touchdown, as well as seven carries for 26 yards and a touchdown. For the seventh consecutive season, he earned a Pro Bowl nomination.

==== 2023 season ====
In the 2023 season, Juszczyk appeared in all 17 games and started 16. He finished with 14 receptions for 119 yards and two touchdowns. He earned first team All-Pro honors and an eighth Pro Bowl nomination. Juszczyk appeared in Super Bowl LVIII against the Chiefs and recorded two receptions for 31 yards in the 25–22 overtime loss.

==== 2024 season ====
In the 2024 season, Juszczyk appeared in all 17 games and started 15. He finished with 19 receptions for 200 yards and two touchdowns to go along with a rushing touchdown. He earned a ninth consecutive Pro Bowl nomination.

On March 11, 2025, Juszczyk was released by the 49ers. Head coach Kyle Shanahan rationalized the move as wanting to give Juszczyk an opportunity to see his options in free agency before they attempted to match any offer he received. Releasing him also removed some financial restrictions which his original contract burdened the 49ers with.

==== 2025 season ====
Following a short period as a free agent, Juszczyk re-signed with the 49ers on a two-year, $8 million deal on March 19, 2025. On December 23, 2025, Juszczyk was selected to the 2026 Pro Bowl Games, earning his 10th career Pro Bowl selection (10th consecutive) and extending his record for the most Pro Bowl selections by a fullback; he was also named a Pro Bowl starter and garnered first team All-Pro honours. In 17 games (all starts) during the 2025 season, he recorded 24 receptions for 213 yards and two touchdowns, leading NFL fullbacks in receiving yards.

== Career statistics ==
Legend
**Bold**	Career high

=== NFL ===
==== Regular season ====
Year	Team	Games		Rushing					Receiving					Fumbles	
Year	Team	GP	GS	Att	Yds	Avg	Lng	TD	Rec	Yds	Avg	Lng	TD	Fum	Lost
2013	BAL	16	0	0	0	0.0	0	0	0	0	0.0	0	0	0	0
2014	BAL	16	14	0	0	0.0	0	0	19	182	9.6	33	1	**2**	**2**
2015	BAL	16	11	2	3	1.5	2	0	**41**	321	7.8	29	**4**	0	0
2016	BAL	16	7	5	22	4.4	10	1	37	266	7.2	40	0	0	0
2017	SF	14	10	7	31	4.4	12	0	33	315	9.5	44	1	**2**	**2**
2018	SF	16	14	8	30	3.8	12	0	30	**324**	10.8	**56**	1	**2**	**2**
2019	SF	12	12	3	7	2.3	6	0	20	239	**12.0**	49	1	0	0
2020	SF	16	15	**17**	**64**	3.8	10	**2**	19	202	10.6	41	**4**	1	0
2021	SF	17	16	8	22	2.8	6	1	30	296	9.9	26	1	0	0
2022	SF	16	12	7	26	3.7	9	1	19	200	10.5	35	1	0	0
2023	SF	17	16	5	6	1.2	3	0	14	119	8.5	22	2	0	0
2024	SF	17	15	5	26	**5.2**	**14**	1	19	200	10.5	36	2	1	0
2025	SF	17	17	2	−3	−1.5	−2	0	24	213	8.9	25	2	0	0
2026	SF	8	8	1	4	4.0	4	0	8	76	9.5	21	2	0	0
Career		214	167	70	238	3.4	14	6	313	2,953	9.4	56	22	8	6

==== Postseason ====
Year	Team	Games		Rushing					Receiving					Fumbles	
Year	Team	GP	GS	Att	Yds	Avg	Lng	TD	Rec	Yds	Avg	Lng	TD	Fum	Lost
2014	BAL	2	1	0	0	0.0	0	0	**6**	45	7.5	11	0	**1**	0
2019	SF	3	3	0	0	0.0	0	0	3	39	13.0	15	**1**	0	0
2021	SF	3	3	**3**	**14**	**4.7**	**13**	0	2	15	7.5	10	0	0	0
2022	SF	3	3	1	8	8.0	8	0	1	6	6.0	6	0	0	0
2023	SF	3	3	2	5	2.5	3	0	4	**64**	**16.0**	23	0	0	0
2025	SF	2	2	1	-3	-3.0	-3	0	5	60	12.0	**27**	0	**1**	0
Career		16	15	7	24	3.4	13	0	21	229	10.9	27	1	2	0

=== College ===
Year	Team	Games		Receiving					Rushing				
Year	Team	GP	GS	Rec	Yds	Avg	Lng	TD	Att	Yds	Avg	Lng	TD
2009	Harvard	10	1	11	124	11.3	31	3					
2010	Harvard	10	1	25	234	9.4	26	4					
2011	Harvard	10	10	37	512	**13.8**	**60**	7	1	**14**	**14.0**	**14**	0
2012	Harvard	10	10	**52**	**706**	13.6	59	**8**	**2**	5	2.5	3	0
Career		40	22	125	1,576	12.6	60	22	3	19	6.3	14	0

== Personal life ==
Kristin Juszczyk and husband Kyle Juszczyk in 2024

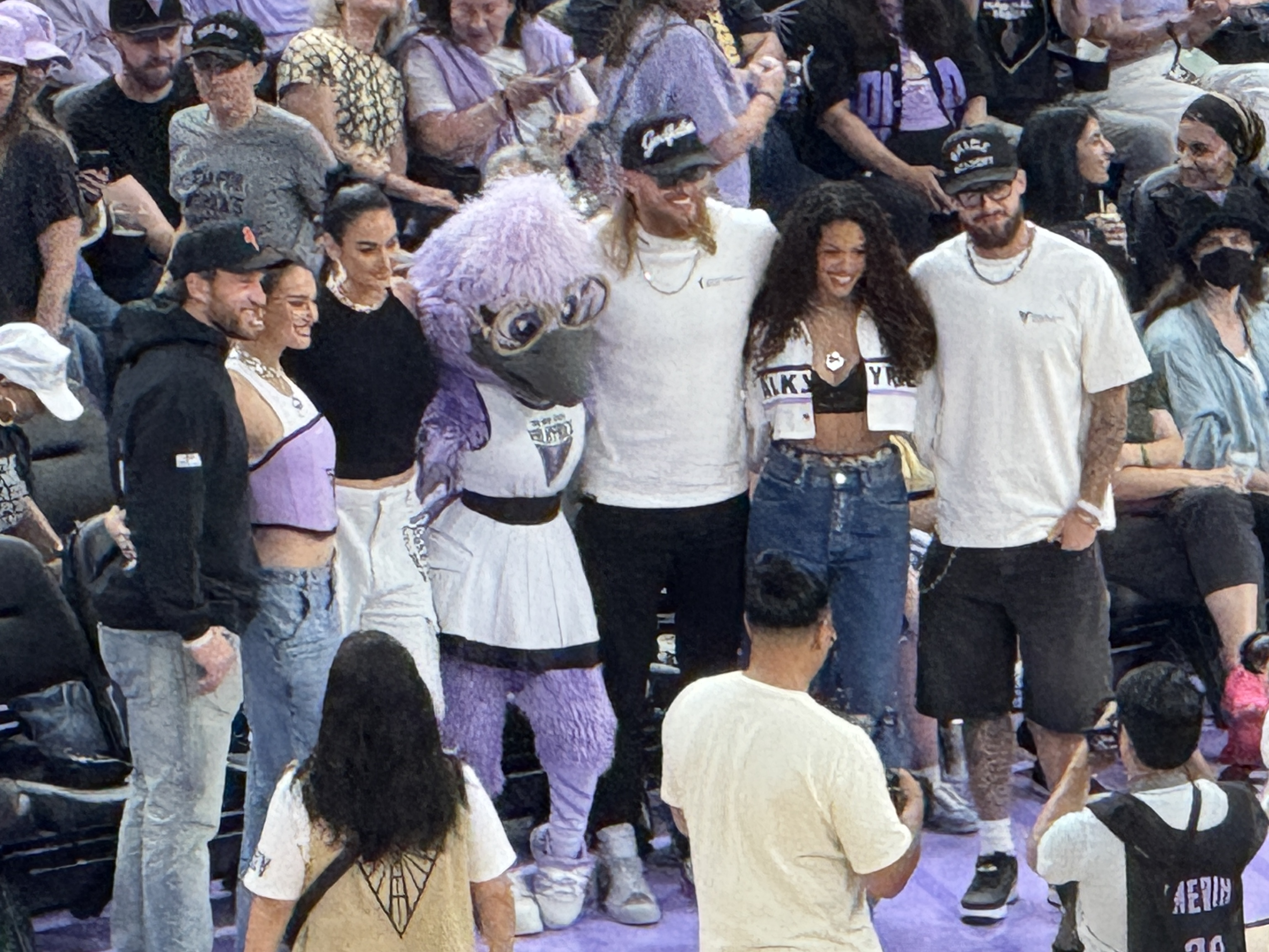
(L-R) Kyle Juszczyk, Kristin Juszczyk, Claire Kittle, Violet (Valkyries mascot), George Kittle, Tori Moraga and Ricky Pearsall at the Indiana Fever vs. Golden State Valkyries game at Chase Center in San Francisco, Calif. on Aug. 31, 2025.

Juszczyk married Kristin Arceri in July 2019. During the 2023 season, Kristin gained national attention after designing a Travis Kelce-inspired jacket for Taylor Swift. She would later obtain a licensing deal with the NFL.
