= William Fuller (American football) =

American football player (born 1962)

No. 95
- Position: Defensive end

Personal information
- Born: March 8, 1962 (age 64); Norfolk, Virginia, U.S.
- Listed height: 6 ft 3 in (1.91 m)
- Listed weight: 280 lb (127 kg)

Career information
- High school: Indian River (Chesapeake, Virginia)
- College: North Carolina
- Supplemental draft: 1984: 1st round, 21st overall pick

Career history
- Philadelphia/Baltimore Stars (1984–1985); Houston Oilers (1986–1993); Philadelphia Eagles (1994–1996); San Diego Chargers (1997–1998)

Awards and highlights
- Second-team All-Pro (1995); 4× Pro Bowl (1991, 1994–1996); USFL All-Time Team; All-USFL (1985); Consensus All-American (1983); First-team All-American (1982); 2× First-team All-ACC (1982, 1983); North Carolina Tar Heels Jersey No. 95 honored

Career NFL statistics
- Total tackles: 483
- Sacks: 100.5
- Forced fumbles: 19
- Fumble recoveries: 8
- Interceptions: 2
- Defensive touchdowns: 1
- Stats at Pro Football Reference
- College Football Hall of Fame

William Henry Fuller Jr. (born March 8, 1962) is an American former professional football player who was a defensive end for 13 seasons in the National Football League (NFL). Fuller played college football for the North Carolina Tar Heels and professionally for the Philadelphia/Baltimore Stars of the United States Football League (USFL), and the Houston Oilers, Philadelphia Eagles, and San Diego Chargers of the NFL. Fuller was one of the better pass rushers in the NFL during his time in the league and finished his career with 100.5 sacks. He was named to the Pro Bowl four times and selected as an All-American twice while in college. In 2004, Fuller was inducted into the Virginia Sports Hall of Fame. During his career and after his retirement, Fuller has also done considerable work in raising funds for diabetes research.

== Early life ==
Fuller was born in Norfolk, Virginia. He grew up in Chesapeake, Virginia, and attended Indian River High School, where he lettered in track, basketball, and football. Fuller graduated from Indian River in 1980.

== College career ==
Fuller attended the University of North Carolina at Chapel Hill, where he played defensive line for the North Carolina Tar Heels football team. He recorded nine sacks and 22 tackles for loss as a sophomore.

As a senior, he had 81 tackles, a team-leading five sacks, and 22 tackles for loss. For his efforts that season he was awarded All-American and first-team All-Atlantic Coast Conference (ACC) honors as well as UNC's defensive Most Valuable Player award. Fuller was also a finalist for the Lombardi and Outland Trophies, special awards designated only for linemen.

While at UNC, Fuller helped lead the Tar Heels to three bowl games, made the All-ACC team three times, and the All-America team twice (1982 and 1983). He graduated in 1986 with a degree in psychology. Fuller was later inducted into UNC's sports hall of fame, and selected as a member of the ACC's 50th Anniversary Football Team in 2002.

== Professional career ==
Fuller was selected by the Philadelphia Stars in the 1984 USFL Territorial Draft. He was also selected with the 21st selection in the first round of the 1984 NFL Supplemental Draft of USFL and CFL Players by the Los Angeles Rams. Fuller decided to play in the USFL with the Stars, where he played for two seasons, winning two USFL championships and playing with future NFL players such as Bart Oates and Sam Mills.

Fuller joined the NFL after the USFL folded in 1986 and his rights were subsequently traded by the Rams to the Houston Oilers where he started his career in the NFL. After recording a total of 3 sacks in his first two seasons, Fuller emerged in 1988 and tied for the team lead in sacks with 8.5. He was described as the most improved defensive player on the team by head coach Jerry Glanville.

After recording 14.5 sacks over 1989 and 1990, Fuller finished tied for second in the NFL with 15 sacks in 1991, and was named to his first Pro Bowl. He followed that up by recording eight and ten sacks, respectively in 1992 and 1993. After the 1993 season Fuller signed a three-year $8 Million contract as a free agent with the Philadelphia Eagles, in part out of a desire to be closer to his off–season home in Virginia.

He subsequently played three stellar seasons in 1994, 1995, and 1996. He recorded 9.5 sacks in his first season there (1994) and set a team record for most consecutive games with a sack at seven. Fuller had 13 sacks in each of the following two seasons (1995 and 1996), and was named to the Pro Bowl in each of his three seasons with the Eagles. After the 1996 season, Fuller signed a two-year $5.6 million contract with the San Diego Chargers, while there his production steeply declined.

After two seasons, in which he recorded three sacks each, Fuller retired following the 1998 season. By the time his NFL career ended, Fuller had recorded 100.5 sacks becoming one of the few players in NFL history to record more than 100 sacks.

== NFL career statistics ==
Legend
**Bold**	Career high

Year	Team	GP	Tackles				Interceptions			Fumbles			
Year	Team	GP	Cmb	Solo	Ast	Sck	Int	Yds	TD	FF	FR	Yds	TD
1986	HOU	13	22	—	—	1.0	0	0	0	0	0	0	0
1987	HOU	12	22	—	—	2.0	0	0	0	0	1	0	0
1988	HOU	16	**56**	—	—	8.5	**1**	**9**	0	2	0	0	0
1989	HOU	15	42	—	—	6.5	0	0	0	1	0	0	0
1990	HOU	16	50	—	—	8.0	0	0	0	0	1	0	0
1991	HOU	16	54	—	—	**15.0**	0	0	0	1	**2**	3	0
1992	HOU	15	52	—	—	8.0	0	0	0	1	1	**10**	**1**
1993	HOU	16	37	—	—	10.0	0	0	0	2	0	0	0
1994	PHI	16	50	**44**	6	9.5	0	0	0	4	1	0	0
1995	PHI	14	46	35	**11**	13.0	0	0	0	**5**	1	0	0
1996	PHI	16	34	27	7	13.0	0	0	0	3	1	0	0
1997	SD	16	29	24	5	3.0	**1**	0	0	0	0	0	0
1998	SD	13	22	18	4	3.0	0	0	0	0	0	0	0
Total		194	516	148	33	100.5	2	9	0	19	8	13	1

== Personal life ==
Fuller has four daughters by his wife Precilla, Karen, Krystal, Kimberly, and Kalisa. Shortly before the 1995 season Fuller's father, who was blind at the time due to type 1 diabetes, died. Fuller and his father were very close and had filmed a United Way and the NFL commercial together during the offseason. The commercial, which featured an organization for the blind, was not aired until two days after his father's death.

Fuller is also a noted philanthropist, who was actively involved in programs relating to Juvenile diabetes, Special Olympics, Ronald McDonald House and the Boys' Clubs of America during his time in the NFL. He hosts the William Fuller Tournament in Houston for JDRF (formerly Juvenile Diabetes Research Foundation). The event has raised over $1 million for research to cure diabetes, and Fuller himself has helped raise over $3 million for diabetes research.

Fuller currently owns and operates his own real estate development company, Fulco Development, which is based in Norfolk. His company is currently working on development projects in the Hampton Roads region. He has also donated his time as an assistant football coach for Frank W. Cox High School in Virginia Beach. In 2011, Fuller became a radio commentator for the Virginia Destroyers UFL team.
