= Scott Urch =

American football player (born 1965)

No. 73
- Position: Offensive tackle

Personal information
- Born: July 25, 1965 (age 61); Niagara Falls, New York, U.S.
- Listed height: 6 ft 2 in (1.88 m)
- Listed weight: 270 lb (122 kg)

Career information
- High school: Plum
- College: Virginia
- NFL draft: 1987: undrafted

Career history
- Dallas Cowboys (1987)*; New York Giants (1987)
- * Offseason or practice squad member only

Career NFL statistics
- Games played: 3
- Games started: 1
- Stats at Pro Football Reference

Scott Eric Urch (born July 25, 1965) is an American former professional football player who was a tackle for the New York Giants of the National Football League (NFL). He played college football for the Virginia Cavaliers.
