= Brian Blados =

American football player (born 1962)

No. 74, 63, 69
- Positions: Guard, tackle

Personal information
- Born: January 11, 1962 (age 64); Arlington, Virginia, U.S.
- Listed height: 6 ft 5 in (1.96 m)
- Listed weight: 308 lb (140 kg)

Career information
- High school: Washington-Lee (Arlington)
- College: North Carolina
- NFL draft: 1984: 1st round, 28th overall pick

Career history
- Cincinnati Bengals (1984–1991); Indianapolis Colts (1991); Seattle Seahawks (1992)*; Tampa Bay Buccaneers (1992)
- * Offseason or practice squad member only

Awards and highlights
- PFWA All-Rookie Team (1984); First-team All-American (1983); First-team All-ACC (1983); North Carolina Tar Heels Jersey No. 60 honored

Career NFL statistics
- Games played: 107
- Games started: 63
- Stats at Pro Football Reference

Brian Blados (born January 11, 1962) is an American former professional football player who was an offensive guard and offensive tackle for nine seasons with the Cincinnati Bengals, Indianapolis Colts and Tampa Bay Buccaneers in the National Football League (NFL). He was selected 28th overall by the Bengals in the first round of the 1984 NFL draft. He attended Washington-Lee High School. His high school teammates called him "Mutton Head" because his head was "as big as a lamb and full of wool." Blados was the first 300lb offensive lineman to start in the NFL and played nine seasons, mostly with the Cincinnati Bengals, and was an integral part of the team that reached Super Bowl XXIII. Blados currently resides in the Cincinnati area.
