= Tyrone Davis (defensive back) =

American football player (born 1961)

No. 39
- Position: Defensive back

Personal information
- Born: November 17, 1961 (age 64); Athens, Georgia, U.S.
- Listed height: 6 ft 1 in (1.85 m)
- Listed weight: 190 lb (86 kg)

Career information
- High school: Cedar Shoals (Athens)
- College: Clemson
- NFL draft: 1985: 3rd round, 58th overall pick

Career history
- New York Giants (1985–1986); Denver Broncos (1988)*
- * Offseason or practice squad member only
- Stats at Pro Football Reference

Joseph Tyrone Davis (born November 17, 1961) is an American former professional football defensive back who played for the New York Giants of the National Football League (NFL). He played college football for the Clemson Tigers and was selected by the Giants in the third round of the 1985 NFL draft.

== Early life ==
Joseph Tyrone Davis was born on November 17, 1961, in Athens, Georgia. He attended Cedar Shoals High School in Athens.

== College career ==
In March 1980, Davis committed to Clemson University to play college football for the Tigers. He took a redshirt year and did not earn a varsity letter until 1982. He was a three-year letterman from 1982 to 1984. Davis finished his college career with eight interceptions.

== Professional career ==
Davis was selected by the New York Giants in the third round, with the 58th overall pick, of the 1985 NFL draft. He was shocked at being drafted so high by the Giants. He signed with the team on June 4. Davis saw increased time during training camp because Giants starting cornerback Mark Haynes was holding out for a better contract. Davis played in seven games for the Giants as a reserve cornerback/safety during the 1985 season before being placed on injured reserve on November 1, 1985. On August 25, 1986, he was placed on injured reserve again, missing the entire 1986 season. Davis was released by the Giants on August 31, 1987, after the third of four preseason games.

Davis signed with the Denver Broncos on April 7, 1988. He was released on July 18, 1988, during training camp.
