= Jim Dombrowski =

American football player (born 1963)

No. 72
- Positions: Guard, offensive tackle

Personal information
- Born: October 19, 1963 (age 63); Williamsville, New York, U.S.
- Listed height: 6 ft 5 in (1.96 m)
- Listed weight: 300 lb (136 kg)

Career information
- High school: Williamsville South
- College: Virginia
- NFL draft: 1986: 1st round, 6th overall pick

Career history
- New Orleans Saints (1986–1996)

Awards and highlights
- New Orleans Saints Hall of Fame; Unanimous All-American (1985); 2× First-team All-ACC (1984, 1985); Virginia Cavaliers No. 73 retired

Career NFL statistics
- Games played: 151
- Games started: 137
- Fumble recoveries: 3
- Stats at Pro Football Reference
- College Football Hall of Fame

James Matthew Dombrowski (born October 19, 1963) is an American former professional football player who played his entire 11-years career as a guard and offensive tackle for the New Orleans Saints of the National Football League (NFL). Dombrowski played college football for the Virginia Cavaliers, earning consensus All-American honors. A first-round pick in the 1986 NFL draft, he was elected to the College Football Hall of Fame in 2008 and the Virginia Sports Hall of Fame in 2010.

== Early life ==
Dombrowski was born in Williamsville, New York. He graduated from Williamsville South High School, and played for the Williamsville South Billies high school football team.

== College career ==
Dombrowski accepted an athletic scholarship to attend the University of Virginia, where he played for coach George Welsh's Virginia Cavaliers football team from 1982 to 1985. He won numerous accolades as one of the finest student-athletes in the history of UVa athletics, including being recognized as a unanimous first-team All-American as a senior in 1985. He was also a two-time first-team All-Atlantic Coast Conference (ACC) selection in 1984 and 1985, the recipient of the ACC's Jacobs Blocking Trophy in 1984 and 1985 as the conference's best offensive lineman, and a first-team Academic All-Conference honoree in 1985. After graduation, he was later honored as a recipient of the NCAA's Today's Top Six Award for his combined athletic ability, academic achievement, leadership characteristics and campus involvement. Dombrowski's No. 73 jersey has been retired by the university.

== Professional career ==
The New Orleans Saints chose Dombrowski in the first round, sixth pick overall, of the 1986 NFL draft. He played for the Saints from 1986 to 1996. After seeing action in only three games as a rookie in 1986, he became a consistent starter for the Saints in his second NFL season in 1987. Dombrowski played left tackle until the middle of the 1989 season, and then played left guard until his retirement in 1996. He ultimately played his entire professional career with the Saints and was named to the franchise's 30th and 35th anniversary teams. During his 11 NFL seasons, he played in 151 regular season games and started 137 of them.

== Life after football ==
Dombrowski earned his master's degree in education in 1991. He resides in Mandeville, Louisiana and works as a certified financial planner for Benjamin F. Edwards. He was inducted into the College Football Hall of Fame in 2008, and the Greater Buffalo Sports Hall of Fame in 2009. In 2013, he was elected into the National Polish-American Sports Hall of Fame.
