= Lester Lyles (American football) =

American football player (born 1962)

No. 26, 24
- Position: Cornerback/Safety

Personal information
- Born: December 27, 1962 (age 63); Washington, D.C., U.S.
- Listed height: 6 ft 3 in (1.91 m)
- Listed weight: 218 lb (99 kg)

Career information
- High school: St. Albans (D.C)
- College: Virginia
- NFL draft: 1985: 2nd round, 40th overall pick

Career history
- New York Jets (1985–1987); Phoenix Cardinals (1988); San Diego Chargers (1989–1990)

Awards and highlights
- First-team All-American (1984); 2× First-team All-ACC (1983, 1984)

Career NFL statistics
- Games played – started: 63 – 23
- Sacks: 5
- Interceptions: 10
- Stats at Pro Football Reference

Lester Everett Lyles (born December 27, 1962) is an American former professional football player who was a cornerback and safety in the National Football League (NFL).

Lyles was born and raised in Washington, D.C. and played scholastically at St. Albans School. He played collegiately for the Virginia Cavaliers, where, as a senior, he was honored by Gannett News Service as a first-team All-American.

Lyles was selected by the New York Jets in the second round of the 1985 NFL Draft. He played six seasons for the Jets, Phoenix Cardinals, and San Diego Chargers, recording ten interceptions, five sacks, and three fumble recoveries.

== Family ==
Lyle's son, Jairus Lyles, was a member of the Utah Jazz.
