= Bob Olderman =

American football player (1962–1993)

No. 64
- Position: Offensive guard

Personal information
- Born: June 6, 1962; Brookville, Pennsylvania, U.S.
- Died: October 20, 1993 (aged 31); Atlanta, Georgia, U.S.
- Listed height: 6 ft 5 in (1.96 m)
- Listed weight: 262 lb (119 kg)

Career information
- High school: Marist (Brookhaven, Georgia)
- College: Virginia (1980–1984)
- NFL draft: 1985: 4th round, 99th overall pick

Career history
- Kansas City Chiefs (1985); Denver Broncos (1987)*
- * Offseason or practice squad member only

Awards and highlights
- First-team All-ACC (1984)

Career NFL statistics
- Games played: 16
- Games started: 14
- Stats at Pro Football Reference

Robert Bruce Olderman (June 6, 1962 – October 20, 1993) was an American professional football offensive guard who played one season with the Kansas City Chiefs of the National Football League (NFL). He was selected by the Chiefs in the fourth round of the 1985 NFL draft after playing college football at the University of Virginia.

== Early life and college ==
Robert Bruce Olderman was born on June 6, 1962, in Brookville, Pennsylvania. He attended Marist School in Brookhaven, Georgia.

Olderman was a member of the Virginia Cavaliers football team from 1980 to 1984 and a three-year letterman from 1982 to 1984. He was redshirted in 1980. His senior year in 1984, he was a team captain and was named first-team All-ACC by the Associated Press.

== Professional career ==
Olderman was selected by the Kansas City Chiefs in the fourth round, with the 99th overall pick, of the 1985 NFL draft. He officially signed with the team on July 19. He played in all 16 games, starting 14, for the Chiefs during his rookie year in 1985. He was released on August 26, 1986.

Olderman signed with the Denver Broncos on May 1, 1987. He was released on September 7, 1987.

== Later life ==
Olderman was involved in real estate in Atlanta, Georgia after his NFL career. On October 20, 1993, in Atlanta, he died at the age of 31 from Castleman disease.
