= List of Pac-12 Conference football standings =

The Pac-12 Conference first sponsored football in 1916. This is an era-list of its annual standings from 1959 to present.

== Standings ==
=== Athletic Association of Western Universities (AAWU) era (1959–1967) ===
1959 Athletic Association of Western Universities football standings
| | Conf. | | | | | Overall |
| Team | W | | L | | T | W | | L | | T |
|---|---|---|---|---|---|---|---|---|---|---|
| No. 8 Washington ^ + | 3 | – | 1 | – | 0 | 10 | – | 1 | – | 0 |
| No. 14 USC + | 3 | – | 1 | – | 0 | 8 | – | 2 | – | 0 |
| UCLA + | 3 | – | 1 | – | 0 | 5 | – | 4 | – | 1 |
| California | 1 | – | 3 | – | 0 | 2 | – | 8 | – | 0 |
| Stanford | 0 | – | 4 | – | 0 | 3 | – | 7 | – | 0 |
+ – Conference co-champions; ^ – Selected as Rose Bowl representative; Rankings from AP poll

1960 Athletic Association of Western Universities football standings
| | Conf. | | | | | Overall |
| Team | W | | L | | T | W | | L | | T |
|---|---|---|---|---|---|---|---|---|---|---|
| No. 6 Washington $ | 4 | – | 0 | – | 0 | 10 | – | 1 | – | 0 |
| USC | 3 | – | 1 | – | 0 | 4 | – | 6 | – | 0 |
| UCLA | 2 | – | 2 | – | 0 | 7 | – | 2 | – | 1 |
| California | 1 | – | 3 | – | 0 | 2 | – | 7 | – | 1 |
| Stanford | 0 | – | 4 | – | 0 | 0 | – | 10 | – | 0 |
$ – Conference champion; Rankings from AP poll

1961 Athletic Association of Western Universities football standings
| | Conf. | | | | | Overall |
| Team | W | | L | | T | W | | L | | T |
|---|---|---|---|---|---|---|---|---|---|---|
| No. 16 UCLA $ | 3 | – | 1 | – | 0 | 7 | – | 4 | – | 0 |
| USC | 2 | – | 1 | – | 1 | 4 | – | 5 | – | 1 |
| Washington | 2 | – | 1 | – | 1 | 5 | – | 4 | – | 1 |
| Stanford | 1 | – | 3 | – | 0 | 4 | – | 6 | – | 0 |
| California | 1 | – | 3 | – | 0 | 1 | – | 8 | – | 1 |
$ – Conference champion; Rankings from AP poll

1962 Athletic Association of Western Universities football standings
| | Conf. | | | | | Overall |
| Team | W | | L | | T | W | | L | | T |
|---|---|---|---|---|---|---|---|---|---|---|
| No. 1 USC $ | 4 | – | 0 | – | 0 | 11 | – | 0 | – | 0 |
| Washington | 4 | – | 1 | – | 0 | 7 | – | 1 | – | 2 |
| Washington State | 1 | – | 1 | – | 0 | 5 | – | 4 | – | 1 |
| Stanford | 2 | – | 3 | – | 0 | 5 | – | 5 | – | 0 |
| UCLA | 1 | – | 3 | – | 0 | 4 | – | 6 | – | 0 |
| California | 0 | – | 4 | – | 0 | 1 | – | 9 | – | 0 |
$ – Conference champion; Rankings from AP Poll

1963 Athletic Association of Western Universities football standings
| | Conf. | | | | | Overall |
| Team | W | | L | | T | W | | L | | T |
|---|---|---|---|---|---|---|---|---|---|---|
| Washington $ | 4 | – | 1 | – | 0 | 6 | – | 5 | – | 0 |
| USC | 3 | – | 1 | – | 0 | 7 | – | 3 | – | 0 |
| UCLA | 2 | – | 2 | – | 0 | 2 | – | 8 | – | 0 |
| Washington State | 1 | – | 1 | – | 0 | 3 | – | 6 | – | 1 |
| California | 1 | – | 3 | – | 0 | 4 | – | 5 | – | 1 |
| Stanford | 1 | – | 4 | – | 0 | 3 | – | 7 | – | 0 |
$ – Conference champion

1964 Athletic Association of Western Universities football standings
| | Conf. | | | | | Overall |
| Team | W | | L | | T | W | | L | | T |
|---|---|---|---|---|---|---|---|---|---|---|
| No. 8 Oregon State ^ + | 3 | – | 1 | – | 0 | 8 | – | 3 | – | 0 |
| No. 10 USC + | 3 | – | 1 | – | 0 | 7 | – | 3 | – | 0 |
| Washington | 5 | – | 2 | – | 0 | 6 | – | 4 | – | 0 |
| UCLA | 2 | – | 2 | – | 0 | 4 | – | 6 | – | 0 |
| Stanford | 3 | – | 4 | – | 0 | 5 | – | 5 | – | 0 |
| Oregon | 1 | – | 2 | – | 1 | 7 | – | 2 | – | 1 |
| Washington State | 1 | – | 2 | – | 1 | 3 | – | 6 | – | 1 |
| California | 0 | – | 4 | – | 0 | 3 | – | 7 | – | 0 |
+ – Conference co-champions; ^ – Rose Bowl representative determined by longest absence, due to no head-to-head result and 4–4 tie in member vote.; Rankings from AP Poll

1965 Athletic Association of Western Universities football standings
| | Conf. | | | | | Overall |
| Team | W | | L | | T | W | | L | | T |
|---|---|---|---|---|---|---|---|---|---|---|
| No. 4 UCLA $ | 4 | – | 0 | – | 0 | 8 | – | 2 | – | 1 |
| No. 10 USC | 4 | – | 1 | – | 0 | 7 | – | 2 | – | 1 |
| Washington State | 2 | – | 1 | – | 0 | 7 | – | 3 | – | 0 |
| Washington | 4 | – | 3 | – | 0 | 5 | – | 5 | – | 0 |
| Stanford | 2 | – | 3 | – | 0 | 6 | – | 3 | – | 1 |
| California | 2 | – | 3 | – | 0 | 5 | – | 5 | – | 0 |
| Oregon State | 1 | – | 3 | – | 0 | 5 | – | 5 | – | 0 |
| Oregon | 0 | – | 5 | – | 0 | 4 | – | 5 | – | 1 |
$ – Conference champion; Rankings from AP Poll

1966 Athletic Association of Western Universities football standings
| | Conf. | | | | | Overall |
| Team | W | | L | | T | W | | L | | T |
|---|---|---|---|---|---|---|---|---|---|---|
| USC $ | 4 | – | 1 | – | 0 | 7 | – | 4 | – | 0 |
| No. 5 UCLA | 3 | – | 1 | – | 0 | 9 | – | 1 | – | 0 |
| Oregon State | 3 | – | 1 | – | 0 | 7 | – | 3 | – | 0 |
| Washington | 4 | – | 3 | – | 0 | 6 | – | 4 | – | 0 |
| California | 2 | – | 3 | – | 0 | 3 | – | 7 | – | 0 |
| Oregon | 1 | – | 3 | – | 0 | 3 | – | 7 | – | 0 |
| Washington State | 1 | – | 3 | – | 0 | 3 | – | 7 | – | 0 |
| Stanford | 1 | – | 4 | – | 0 | 5 | – | 5 | – | 0 |
$ – Conference champion; Rankings from AP Poll

1967 Athletic Association of Western Universities football standings
| | Conf. | | | | | Overall |
| Team | W | | L | | T | W | | L | | T |
|---|---|---|---|---|---|---|---|---|---|---|
| No. 1 USC $ | 6 | – | 1 | – | 0 | 10 | – | 1 | – | 0 |
| No. 7 Oregon State | 4 | – | 1 | – | 1 | 7 | – | 2 | – | 1 |
| UCLA | 4 | – | 1 | – | 1 | 7 | – | 2 | – | 1 |
| Stanford | 3 | – | 4 | – | 0 | 5 | – | 5 | – | 0 |
| Washington | 3 | – | 4 | – | 0 | 5 | – | 5 | – | 0 |
| California | 2 | – | 3 | – | 0 | 5 | – | 5 | – | 0 |
| Oregon | 1 | – | 5 | – | 0 | 2 | – | 8 | – | 0 |
| Washington State | 1 | – | 5 | – | 0 | 2 | – | 8 | – | 0 |
$ – Conference champion; Rankings from AP Poll

=== Pacific-8 Conference era (1968–1977) ===
1968 Pacific-8 Conference football standings
| | Conf. | | | | | Overall |
| Team | W | | L | | T | W | | L | | T |
|---|---|---|---|---|---|---|---|---|---|---|
| No. 4 USC $ | 6 | – | 0 | – | 0 | 9 | – | 1 | – | 1 |
| No. 15 Oregon State | 5 | – | 1 | – | 0 | 7 | – | 3 | – | 0 |
| Stanford | 3 | – | 3 | – | 1 | 6 | – | 3 | – | 1 |
| California | 2 | – | 2 | – | 1 | 7 | – | 3 | – | 1 |
| Oregon | 2 | – | 4 | – | 0 | 4 | – | 6 | – | 0 |
| UCLA | 2 | – | 4 | – | 0 | 3 | – | 7 | – | 0 |
| Washington State | 1 | – | 3 | – | 1 | 3 | – | 6 | – | 1 |
| Washington | 1 | – | 5 | – | 1 | 3 | – | 5 | – | 2 |
$ – Conference champion; Rankings from AP Poll

1969 Pacific-8 Conference football standings
| | Conf. | | | | | Overall |
| Team | W | | L | | T | W | | L | | T |
|---|---|---|---|---|---|---|---|---|---|---|
| No. 3 USC $ | 6 | – | 0 | – | 0 | 10 | – | 0 | – | 1 |
| No. 13 UCLA | 5 | – | 1 | – | 1 | 8 | – | 1 | – | 1 |
| No. 19 Stanford | 5 | – | 1 | – | 1 | 7 | – | 2 | – | 1 |
| Oregon State | 4 | – | 3 | – | 0 | 6 | – | 4 | – | 0 |
| Oregon | 2 | – | 3 | – | 0 | 5 | – | 5 | – | 1 |
| California | 2 | – | 4 | – | 0 | 5 | – | 5 | – | 0 |
| Washington | 1 | – | 6 | – | 0 | 1 | – | 9 | – | 0 |
| Washington State | 0 | – | 7 | – | 0 | 1 | – | 9 | – | 0 |
$ – Conference champion; Rankings from AP Poll

1970 Pacific-8 Conference football standings
| | Conf. | | | | | Overall |
| Team | W | | L | | T | W | | L | | T |
|---|---|---|---|---|---|---|---|---|---|---|
| No. 8 Stanford $ | 6 | – | 1 | – | 0 | 9 | – | 3 | – | 0 |
| Washington | 4 | – | 3 | – | 0 | 6 | – | 4 | – | 0 |
| Oregon | 4 | – | 3 | – | 0 | 6 | – | 4 | – | 1 |
| UCLA | 4 | – | 3 | – | 0 | 6 | – | 5 | – | 0 |
| California | 4 | – | 3 | – | 0 | 6 | – | 5 | – | 0 |
| No. 15 USC | 3 | – | 4 | – | 0 | 6 | – | 4 | – | 1 |
| Oregon State | 3 | – | 4 | – | 0 | 6 | – | 5 | – | 0 |
| Washington State | 0 | – | 7 | – | 0 | 1 | – | 10 | – | 0 |
$ – Conference champion; Rankings from AP Poll

1971 Pacific-8 Conference football standings
| | Conf. | | | | | Overall |
| Team | W | | L | | T | W | | L | | T |
|---|---|---|---|---|---|---|---|---|---|---|
| No. 10 Stanford $ | 6 | – | 1 | – | 0 | 9 | – | 3 | – | 0 |
| No. 20 USC | 3 | – | 2 | – | 1 | 6 | – | 4 | – | 1 |
| No. 19 Washington | 4 | – | 3 | – | 0 | 8 | – | 3 | – | 0 |
| California | 4 | – | 3 | – | 0 | 6 | – | 5 | – | 0 |
| Oregon State | 3 | – | 3 | – | 0 | 5 | – | 6 | – | 0 |
| Oregon | 2 | – | 4 | – | 0 | 5 | – | 6 | – | 0 |
| Washington State | 2 | – | 5 | – | 0 | 4 | – | 7 | – | 0 |
| UCLA | 1 | – | 4 | – | 1 | 2 | – | 7 | – | 1 |
$ – Conference champion; Rankings from AP Poll

1972 Pacific-8 Conference football standings
| | Conf. | | | | | Overall |
| Team | W | | L | | T | W | | L | | T |
|---|---|---|---|---|---|---|---|---|---|---|
| No. 1 USC $ | 7 | – | 0 | – | 0 | 12 | – | 0 | – | 0 |
| No. 15 UCLA | 5 | – | 2 | – | 0 | 8 | – | 3 | – | 0 |
| No. 19 Washington State | 4 | – | 3 | – | 0 | 7 | – | 4 | – | 0 |
| Washington | 4 | – | 3 | – | 0 | 8 | – | 3 | – | 0 |
| California | 3 | – | 4 | – | 0 | 3 | – | 8 | – | 0 |
| Oregon | 2 | – | 5 | – | 0 | 5 | – | 6 | – | 0 |
| Stanford | 2 | – | 5 | – | 0 | 6 | – | 5 | – | 0 |
| Oregon State | 1 | – | 6 | – | 0 | 2 | – | 9 | – | 0 |
$ – Conference champion; Rankings from AP Poll

1973 Pacific-8 Conference football standings
| | Conf. | | | | | Overall |
| Team | W | | L | | T | W | | L | | T |
|---|---|---|---|---|---|---|---|---|---|---|
| No. 8 USC $ | 7 | – | 0 | – | 0 | 9 | – | 2 | – | 1 |
| No. 12 UCLA | 6 | – | 1 | – | 0 | 9 | – | 2 | – | 0 |
| Stanford | 5 | – | 2 | – | 0 | 7 | – | 4 | – | 0 |
| Washington State | 4 | – | 3 | – | 0 | 5 | – | 6 | – | 0 |
| California | 2 | – | 5 | – | 0 | 4 | – | 7 | – | 0 |
| Oregon | 2 | – | 5 | – | 0 | 2 | – | 9 | – | 0 |
| Oregon State | 2 | – | 5 | – | 0 | 2 | – | 9 | – | 0 |
| Washington | 0 | – | 7 | – | 0 | 2 | – | 9 | – | 0 |
$ – Conference champion; Rankings from AP Poll

1974 Pacific-8 Conference football standings
| | Conf. | | | | | Overall |
| Team | W | | L | | T | W | | L | | T |
|---|---|---|---|---|---|---|---|---|---|---|
| No. 2 USC $ | 6 | – | 0 | – | 1 | 10 | – | 1 | – | 1 |
| Stanford | 5 | – | 1 | – | 1 | 5 | – | 4 | – | 2 |
| California | 4 | – | 2 | – | 1 | 7 | – | 3 | – | 1 |
| UCLA | 4 | – | 2 | – | 1 | 6 | – | 3 | – | 2 |
| Washington | 3 | – | 4 | – | 0 | 5 | – | 6 | – | 0 |
| Oregon State | 3 | – | 4 | – | 0 | 3 | – | 8 | – | 0 |
| Washington State | 1 | – | 6 | – | 0 | 2 | – | 9 | – | 0 |
| Oregon | 0 | – | 7 | – | 0 | 2 | – | 9 | – | 0 |
$ – Conference champion; Rankings from AP Poll

1975 Pacific-8 Conference football standings
| | Conf. | | | | | Overall |
| Team | W | | L | | T | W | | L | | T |
|---|---|---|---|---|---|---|---|---|---|---|
| No. 5 UCLA ^ + | 6 | – | 1 | – | 0 | 9 | – | 2 | – | 1 |
| No. 14 California + | 6 | – | 1 | – | 0 | 8 | – | 3 | – | 0 |
| Stanford | 5 | – | 2 | – | 0 | 6 | – | 4 | – | 1 |
| Washington | 5 | – | 2 | – | 0 | 6 | – | 5 | – | 0 |
| No. 17 USC | 3 | – | 4 | – | 0 | 8 | – | 4 | – | 0 |
| Oregon | 2 | – | 5 | – | 0 | 3 | – | 8 | – | 0 |
| Oregon State | 1 | – | 6 | – | 0 | 1 | – | 10 | – | 0 |
| Washington State | 0 | – | 7 | – | 0 | 3 | – | 8 | – | 0 |
+ – Conference co-champions; ^ – Selected as Rose Bowl representative; Rankings from AP Poll

1976 Pacific-8 Conference football standings
| | Conf. | | | | | Overall |
| Team | W | | L | | T | W | | L | | T |
|---|---|---|---|---|---|---|---|---|---|---|
| No. 2 USC $ | 7 | – | 0 | – | 0 | 11 | – | 1 | – | 0 |
| No. 15 UCLA | 6 | – | 1 | – | 0 | 9 | – | 2 | – | 1 |
| Stanford | 5 | – | 2 | – | 0 | 6 | – | 5 | – | 0 |
| California | 3 | – | 4 | – | 0 | 5 | – | 6 | – | 0 |
| Washington | 3 | – | 4 | – | 0 | 5 | – | 6 | – | 0 |
| Washington State | 2 | – | 5 | – | 0 | 3 | – | 8 | – | 0 |
| Oregon | 1 | – | 6 | – | 0 | 4 | – | 7 | – | 0 |
| Oregon State | 1 | – | 6 | – | 0 | 2 | – | 10 | – | 0 |
$ – Conference champion; Rankings from AP Poll

1977 Pacific-8 Conference football standings
| | Conf. | | | | | Overall |
| Team | W | | L | | T | W | | L | | T |
|---|---|---|---|---|---|---|---|---|---|---|
| No. 10 Washington $ | 6 | – | 1 | – | 0 | 8 | – | 4 | – | 0 |
| No. 15 Stanford | 5 | – | 2 | – | 0 | 9 | – | 3 | – | 0 |
| No. 13 USC | 5 | – | 2 | – | 0 | 8 | – | 4 | – | 0 |
| California | 3 | – | 4 | – | 0 | 7 | – | 4 | – | 0 |
| Washington State | 3 | – | 4 | – | 0 | 6 | – | 5 | – | 0 |
| Oregon | 1 | – | 6 | – | 0 | 2 | – | 9 | – | 0 |
| Oregon State | 0 | – | 7 | – | 0 | 2 | – | 9 | – | 0 |
| UCLA † | 0 | – | 2 | – | 0 | 0 | – | 4 | – | 0 |
$ – Conference champion; † – UCLA forfeited 7 wins (5 conference wins) due to ineligible players.; Rankings from AP Poll

=== Pacific-10 Conference era (1978–2010) ===
1978 Pacific-10 Conference football standings
| | Conf. | | | | | Overall |
| Team | W | | L | | T | W | | L | | T |
|---|---|---|---|---|---|---|---|---|---|---|
| No. 2 USC $ | 6 | – | 1 | – | 0 | 12 | – | 1 | – | 0 |
| No. 14 UCLA | 6 | – | 2 | – | 0 | 8 | – | 3 | – | 1 |
| Washington | 6 | – | 2 | – | 0 | 7 | – | 4 | – | 0 |
| Arizona State | 4 | – | 3 | – | 0 | 9 | – | 3 | – | 0 |
| No. 17 Stanford | 4 | – | 3 | – | 0 | 8 | – | 4 | – | 0 |
| California | 3 | – | 4 | – | 0 | 6 | – | 5 | – | 0 |
| Arizona | 3 | – | 4 | – | 0 | 5 | – | 6 | – | 0 |
| Oregon | 2 | – | 5 | – | 0 | 2 | – | 9 | – | 0 |
| Oregon State | 2 | – | 6 | – | 0 | 3 | – | 7 | – | 1 |
| Washington State | 1 | – | 7 | – | 0 | 3 | – | 7 | – | 1 |
$ – Conference champion; Rankings from AP Poll

1979 Pacific-10 Conference football standings
| | Conf. | | | | | Overall |
| Team | W | | L | | T | W | | L | | T |
|---|---|---|---|---|---|---|---|---|---|---|
| No. 2 USC $ | 6 | – | 0 | – | 1 | 11 | – | 0 | – | 1 |
| No. 11 Washington | 5 | – | 2 | – | 0 | 9 | – | 3 | – | 0 |
| Arizona | 4 | – | 3 | – | 0 | 6 | – | 5 | – | 1 |
| Oregon | 4 | – | 3 | – | 0 | 6 | – | 5 | – | 0 |
| California | 5 | – | 4 | – | 0 | 6 | – | 6 | – | 0 |
| Stanford | 3 | – | 3 | – | 1 | 5 | – | 5 | – | 1 |
| Arizona State * | 3 | – | 4 | – | 0 | 6 | – | 6 | – | 0 |
| UCLA | 3 | – | 4 | – | 0 | 5 | – | 6 | – | 0 |
| Washington State | 2 | – | 6 | – | 0 | 3 | – | 8 | – | 0 |
| Oregon State | 1 | – | 7 | – | 0 | 1 | – | 10 | – | 0 |
$ – Conference champion; * – Arizona State later forfeited 5 wins (3 in conference) due to NCAA sanctions; Rankings from AP Poll

1980 Pacific-10 Conference football standings
| | Conf. | | | | | Overall |
| Team | W | | L | | T | W | | L | | T |
|---|---|---|---|---|---|---|---|---|---|---|
| No. 16 Washington $ | 6 | – | 1 | – | 0 | 9 | – | 3 | – | 0 |
| No. 13 UCLA | 5 | – | 2 | – | 0 | 9 | – | 2 | – | 0 |
| No. 11 USC | 4 | – | 2 | – | 1 | 8 | – | 2 | – | 1 |
| Arizona State | 5 | – | 3 | – | 0 | 7 | – | 4 | – | 0 |
| Oregon | 4 | – | 3 | – | 1 | 6 | – | 3 | – | 2 |
| Stanford | 3 | – | 4 | – | 0 | 6 | – | 5 | – | 0 |
| Arizona | 3 | – | 4 | – | 0 | 5 | – | 6 | – | 0 |
| Washington State | 3 | – | 4 | – | 0 | 4 | – | 7 | – | 0 |
| California | 3 | – | 5 | – | 0 | 3 | – | 8 | – | 0 |
| Oregon State | 0 | – | 8 | – | 0 | 0 | – | 11 | – | 0 |
$ – Conference champion; Rankings from AP Poll

1981 Pacific-10 Conference football standings
| | Conf. | | | | | Overall |
| Team | W | | L | | T | W | | L | | T |
|---|---|---|---|---|---|---|---|---|---|---|
| No. 10 Washington $ | 6 | – | 2 | – | 0 | 10 | – | 2 | – | 0 |
| No. 16 Arizona State | 5 | – | 2 | – | 0 | 9 | – | 2 | – | 0 |
| No. 14 USC | 5 | – | 2 | – | 0 | 9 | – | 3 | – | 0 |
| Washington State | 5 | – | 2 | – | 1 | 8 | – | 3 | – | 1 |
| UCLA | 5 | – | 2 | – | 1 | 7 | – | 4 | – | 1 |
| Arizona | 4 | – | 4 | – | 0 | 6 | – | 5 | – | 0 |
| Stanford | 4 | – | 4 | – | 0 | 4 | – | 7 | – | 0 |
| California | 2 | – | 6 | – | 0 | 2 | – | 9 | – | 0 |
| Oregon | 1 | – | 6 | – | 0 | 2 | – | 9 | – | 0 |
| Oregon State | 0 | – | 7 | – | 0 | 1 | – | 10 | – | 0 |
$ – Conference champion; Rankings from AP Poll

1982 Pacific-10 Conference football standings
| | Conf. | | | | | Overall |
| Team | W | | L | | T | W | | L | | T |
|---|---|---|---|---|---|---|---|---|---|---|
| No. 5 UCLA $ | 5 | – | 1 | – | 1 | 10 | – | 1 | – | 1 |
| No. 7 Washington | 6 | – | 2 | – | 0 | 10 | – | 2 | – | 0 |
| No. 6 Arizona State | 5 | – | 2 | – | 0 | 10 | – | 2 | – | 0 |
| No. 15 USC | 5 | – | 2 | – | 0 | 8 | – | 3 | – | 0 |
| Arizona | 4 | – | 3 | – | 1 | 6 | – | 4 | – | 1 |
| California | 4 | – | 4 | – | 0 | 7 | – | 4 | – | 0 |
| Stanford | 3 | – | 5 | – | 0 | 5 | – | 6 | – | 0 |
| Washington State | 2 | – | 4 | – | 1 | 3 | – | 7 | – | 1 |
| Oregon | 2 | – | 6 | – | 0 | 2 | – | 8 | – | 1 |
| Oregon State | 0 | – | 7 | – | 1 | 1 | – | 9 | – | 1 |
$ – Conference champion; Rankings from AP Poll

1983 Pacific-10 Conference football standings
| | Conf. | | | | | Overall |
| Team | W | | L | | T | W | | L | | T |
|---|---|---|---|---|---|---|---|---|---|---|
| No. 17 UCLA $ | 6 | – | 1 | – | 1 | 7 | – | 4 | – | 1 |
| Washington | 5 | – | 2 | – | 0 | 8 | – | 4 | – | 0 |
| Washington State | 5 | – | 3 | – | 0 | 7 | – | 4 | – | 0 |
| USC | 4 | – | 3 | – | 0 | 4 | – | 6 | – | 1 |
| Arizona | 4 | – | 3 | – | 1 | 7 | – | 3 | – | 1 |
| Arizona State | 3 | – | 3 | – | 1 | 6 | – | 4 | – | 1 |
| Oregon | 3 | – | 3 | – | 1 | 4 | – | 6 | – | 1 |
| California | 3 | – | 4 | – | 1 | 5 | – | 5 | – | 1 |
| Oregon State | 1 | – | 6 | – | 1 | 3 | – | 7 | – | 1 |
| Stanford | 1 | – | 7 | – | 0 | 1 | – | 10 | – | 0 |
$ – Conference champion; Rankings from AP Poll

1984 Pacific-10 Conference football standings
| | Conf. | | | | | Overall |
| Team | W | | L | | T | W | | L | | T |
|---|---|---|---|---|---|---|---|---|---|---|
| No. 10 USC $ | 7 | – | 1 | – | 0 | 9 | – | 3 | – | 0 |
| No. 2 Washington | 6 | – | 1 | – | 0 | 11 | – | 1 | – | 0 |
| No. 9 UCLA | 5 | – | 2 | – | 0 | 9 | – | 3 | – | 0 |
| Arizona | 5 | – | 2 | – | 0 | 7 | – | 4 | – | 0 |
| Washington State | 4 | – | 3 | – | 0 | 6 | – | 5 | – | 0 |
| Arizona State | 3 | – | 4 | – | 0 | 5 | – | 6 | – | 0 |
| Oregon | 3 | – | 5 | – | 0 | 6 | – | 5 | – | 0 |
| Stanford | 3 | – | 5 | – | 0 | 5 | – | 6 | – | 0 |
| Oregon State | 1 | – | 7 | – | 0 | 2 | – | 9 | – | 0 |
| California | 1 | – | 8 | – | 0 | 2 | – | 9 | – | 0 |
$ – Conference champion; Rankings from AP Poll

1985 Pacific-10 Conference football standings
| | Conf. | | | | | Overall |
| Team | W | | L | | T | W | | L | | T |
|---|---|---|---|---|---|---|---|---|---|---|
| No. 7 UCLA $ | 6 | – | 2 | – | 0 | 9 | – | 2 | – | 1 |
| Arizona | 5 | – | 2 | – | 0 | 8 | – | 3 | – | 1 |
| Arizona State | 5 | – | 2 | – | 0 | 8 | – | 4 | – | 0 |
| Washington | 5 | – | 3 | – | 0 | 7 | – | 5 | – | 0 |
| USC | 5 | – | 3 | – | 0 | 6 | – | 6 | – | 0 |
| Oregon | 3 | – | 4 | – | 0 | 5 | – | 6 | – | 0 |
| Washington State | 3 | – | 5 | – | 0 | 4 | – | 7 | – | 0 |
| Stanford | 3 | – | 5 | – | 0 | 4 | – | 7 | – | 0 |
| Oregon State | 2 | – | 6 | – | 0 | 3 | – | 8 | – | 0 |
| California | 2 | – | 7 | – | 0 | 4 | – | 7 | – | 0 |
$ – Conference champion; Rankings from AP Poll

1986 Pacific-10 Conference football standings
| | Conf. | | | | | Overall |
| Team | W | | L | | T | W | | L | | T |
|---|---|---|---|---|---|---|---|---|---|---|
| No. 4 Arizona State $ | 5 | – | 1 | – | 1 | 10 | – | 1 | – | 1 |
| No. 14 UCLA | 5 | – | 2 | – | 1 | 8 | – | 3 | – | 1 |
| No. 18 Washington | 5 | – | 2 | – | 1 | 8 | – | 3 | – | 1 |
| No. 11 Arizona | 5 | – | 3 | – | 0 | 9 | – | 3 | – | 0 |
| Stanford | 5 | – | 3 | – | 0 | 8 | – | 4 | – | 0 |
| USC | 5 | – | 3 | – | 0 | 7 | – | 5 | – | 0 |
| Oregon | 3 | – | 5 | – | 0 | 5 | – | 6 | – | 0 |
| Washington State | 2 | – | 6 | – | 1 | 3 | – | 7 | – | 1 |
| California | 2 | – | 7 | – | 0 | 2 | – | 9 | – | 0 |
| Oregon State | 1 | – | 6 | – | 0 | 3 | – | 8 | – | 0 |
$ – Conference champion; Rankings from AP Poll

1987 Pacific-10 Conference football standings
| | Conf. | | | | | Overall |
| Team | W | | L | | T | W | | L | | T |
|---|---|---|---|---|---|---|---|---|---|---|
| No. 9 UCLA + | 7 | – | 1 | – | 0 | 10 | – | 2 | – | 0 |
| No. 18 USC + | 7 | – | 1 | – | 0 | 8 | – | 4 | – | 0 |
| Washington | 4 | – | 3 | – | 1 | 7 | – | 4 | – | 1 |
| No. 20 Arizona State | 3 | – | 3 | – | 1 | 7 | – | 4 | – | 1 |
| Oregon | 4 | – | 4 | – | 0 | 6 | – | 5 | – | 0 |
| Stanford | 4 | – | 4 | – | 0 | 5 | – | 6 | – | 0 |
| Arizona | 2 | – | 3 | – | 3 | 4 | – | 4 | – | 3 |
| California | 2 | – | 3 | – | 2 | 3 | – | 6 | – | 2 |
| Washington State | 1 | – | 5 | – | 1 | 3 | – | 7 | – | 1 |
| Oregon State | 0 | – | 7 | – | 0 | 2 | – | 9 | – | 0 |
+ – Conference co-champions; Rankings from AP Poll

1988 Pacific-10 Conference football standings
| | Conf. | | | | | Overall |
| Team | W | | L | | T | W | | L | | T |
|---|---|---|---|---|---|---|---|---|---|---|
| No. 7 USC $ | 8 | – | 0 | – | 0 | 10 | – | 2 | – | 0 |
| No. 6 UCLA | 6 | – | 2 | – | 0 | 10 | – | 2 | – | 0 |
| No. 16 Washington State | 5 | – | 3 | – | 0 | 9 | – | 3 | – | 0 |
| Arizona | 5 | – | 3 | – | 0 | 7 | – | 4 | – | 0 |
| Arizona State | 3 | – | 4 | – | 0 | 6 | – | 5 | – | 0 |
| Washington | 3 | – | 5 | – | 0 | 6 | – | 5 | – | 0 |
| Oregon | 3 | – | 5 | – | 0 | 6 | – | 6 | – | 0 |
| Oregon State | 2 | – | 5 | – | 1 | 4 | – | 6 | – | 1 |
| Stanford | 1 | – | 5 | – | 2 | 3 | – | 6 | – | 2 |
| California | 1 | – | 5 | – | 1 | 5 | – | 5 | – | 1 |
$ – Conference champion; Rankings from AP Poll

1989 Pacific-10 Conference football standings
| | Conf. | | | | | Overall |
| Team | W | | L | | T | W | | L | | T |
|---|---|---|---|---|---|---|---|---|---|---|
| No. 8 USC $ | 6 | – | 0 | – | 1 | 9 | – | 2 | – | 1 |
| No. 23 Washington | 5 | – | 3 | – | 0 | 8 | – | 4 | – | 0 |
| Oregon | 5 | – | 3 | – | 0 | 8 | – | 4 | – | 0 |
| No. 25 Arizona | 5 | – | 3 | – | 0 | 8 | – | 4 | – | 0 |
| Arizona State | 3 | – | 3 | – | 1 | 6 | – | 4 | – | 1 |
| Oregon State | 3 | – | 4 | – | 1 | 4 | – | 7 | – | 1 |
| Washington State | 3 | – | 5 | – | 0 | 6 | – | 5 | – | 0 |
| Stanford | 3 | – | 5 | – | 0 | 3 | – | 8 | – | 0 |
| UCLA | 2 | – | 5 | – | 1 | 3 | – | 7 | – | 1 |
| California | 2 | – | 6 | – | 0 | 4 | – | 7 | – | 0 |
$ – Conference champion; Rankings from AP Poll

1990 Pacific-10 Conference football standings
| | Conf. | | | | | Overall |
| Team | W | | L | | T | W | | L | | T |
|---|---|---|---|---|---|---|---|---|---|---|
| No. 5 Washington $ | 7 | – | 1 | – | 0 | 10 | – | 2 | – | 0 |
| No. 20 USC | 5 | – | 2 | – | 1 | 8 | – | 4 | – | 1 |
| Oregon | 4 | – | 3 | – | 0 | 8 | – | 4 | – | 0 |
| California | 4 | – | 3 | – | 1 | 7 | – | 4 | – | 1 |
| Arizona | 5 | – | 4 | – | 0 | 7 | – | 5 | – | 0 |
| UCLA | 4 | – | 4 | – | 0 | 5 | – | 6 | – | 0 |
| Stanford | 4 | – | 4 | – | 0 | 5 | – | 6 | – | 0 |
| Arizona State | 2 | – | 5 | – | 0 | 4 | – | 7 | – | 0 |
| Washington State | 2 | – | 6 | – | 0 | 3 | – | 8 | – | 0 |
| Oregon State | 1 | – | 6 | – | 0 | 1 | – | 10 | – | 0 |
$ – Conference champion; Rankings from AP Poll

1991 Pacific-10 Conference football standings
| | Conf. | | | | | Overall |
| Team | W | | L | | T | W | | L | | T |
|---|---|---|---|---|---|---|---|---|---|---|
| No. 1 Washington $ | 8 | – | 0 | – | 0 | 12 | – | 0 | – | 0 |
| No. 7 California | 6 | – | 2 | – | 0 | 10 | – | 2 | – | 0 |
| No. 18 UCLA | 6 | – | 2 | – | 0 | 9 | – | 3 | – | 0 |
| No. 22 Stanford | 6 | – | 2 | – | 0 | 8 | – | 4 | – | 0 |
| Arizona State | 4 | – | 4 | – | 0 | 6 | – | 5 | – | 0 |
| Arizona | 3 | – | 5 | – | 0 | 4 | – | 7 | – | 0 |
| Washington State | 3 | – | 5 | – | 0 | 4 | – | 7 | – | 0 |
| USC | 2 | – | 6 | – | 0 | 3 | – | 8 | – | 0 |
| Oregon | 1 | – | 7 | – | 0 | 3 | – | 8 | – | 0 |
| Oregon State | 1 | – | 7 | – | 0 | 1 | – | 10 | – | 0 |
$ – Conference champion; Rankings from Coaches Poll

1992 Pacific-10 Conference football standings
| | Conf. | | | | | Overall |
| Team | W | | L | | T | W | | L | | T |
|---|---|---|---|---|---|---|---|---|---|---|
| No. 11 Washington + | 6 | – | 2 | – | 0 | 9 | – | 3 | – | 0 |
| No. 9 Stanford + | 6 | – | 2 | – | 0 | 10 | – | 3 | – | 0 |
| No. 15 Washington State | 5 | – | 3 | – | 0 | 9 | – | 3 | – | 0 |
| USC | 5 | – | 3 | – | 0 | 6 | – | 5 | – | 1 |
| Arizona | 4 | – | 3 | – | 1 | 6 | – | 5 | – | 1 |
| Arizona State | 4 | – | 4 | – | 0 | 6 | – | 5 | – | 0 |
| Oregon | 4 | – | 4 | – | 0 | 6 | – | 6 | – | 0 |
| UCLA | 3 | – | 5 | – | 0 | 6 | – | 5 | – | 0 |
| California | 2 | – | 6 | – | 0 | 4 | – | 7 | – | 0 |
| Oregon State | 0 | – | 7 | – | 1 | 1 | – | 9 | – | 1 |
+ – Conference co-champions; Rankings from AP Poll

1993 Pacific-10 Conference football standings
| | Conf. | | | | | Overall |
| Team | W | | L | | T | W | | L | | T |
|---|---|---|---|---|---|---|---|---|---|---|
| No. 10 Arizona + | 6 | – | 2 | – | 0 | 10 | – | 2 | – | 0 |
| No. 18 UCLA + | 6 | – | 2 | – | 0 | 8 | – | 4 | – | 0 |
| USC + | 6 | – | 2 | – | 0 | 8 | – | 5 | – | 0 |
| Washington | 5 | – | 3 | – | 0 | 7 | – | 4 | – | 0 |
| No. 25 California | 4 | – | 4 | – | 0 | 9 | – | 4 | – | 0 |
| Arizona State | 4 | – | 4 | – | 0 | 6 | – | 5 | – | 0 |
| Washington State | 3 | – | 5 | – | 0 | 5 | – | 6 | – | 0 |
| Oregon | 2 | – | 6 | – | 0 | 5 | – | 6 | – | 0 |
| Oregon State | 2 | – | 6 | – | 0 | 4 | – | 7 | – | 0 |
| Stanford | 2 | – | 6 | – | 0 | 4 | – | 7 | – | 0 |
+ – Conference co-champions; Rankings from AP Poll

1994 Pacific-10 Conference football standings
| | Conf. | | | | | Overall |
| Team | W | | L | | T | W | | L | | T |
|---|---|---|---|---|---|---|---|---|---|---|
| No. 11 Oregon $ | 7 | – | 1 | – | 0 | 9 | – | 4 | – | 0 |
| No. 13 USC | 6 | – | 2 | – | 0 | 8 | – | 3 | – | 1 |
| No. 20 Arizona | 6 | – | 2 | – | 0 | 8 | – | 4 | – | 0 |
| No. 21 Washington State | 5 | – | 3 | – | 0 | 8 | – | 4 | – | 0 |
| Washington | 4 | – | 4 | – | 0 | 7 | – | 4 | – | 0 |
| UCLA | 3 | – | 5 | – | 0 | 5 | – | 6 | – | 0 |
| California | 3 | – | 5 | – | 0 | 4 | – | 7 | – | 0 |
| Oregon State | 2 | – | 6 | – | 0 | 4 | – | 7 | – | 0 |
| Stanford | 2 | – | 6 | – | 0 | 3 | – | 7 | – | 1 |
| Arizona State | 2 | – | 6 | – | 0 | 3 | – | 8 | – | 0 |
$ – Conference champion; Rankings from AP Poll

1995 Pacific-10 Conference football standings
| | Conf. | | | | | Overall |
| Team | W | | L | | T | W | | L | | T |
|---|---|---|---|---|---|---|---|---|---|---|
| No. 12 USC ^ + | 6 | – | 1 | – | 1 | 9 | – | 2 | – | 1 |
| Washington + | 6 | – | 1 | – | 1 | 7 | – | 4 | – | 1 |
| No. 18 Oregon | 6 | – | 2 | – | 0 | 9 | – | 3 | – | 0 |
| Stanford | 5 | – | 3 | – | 0 | 7 | – | 4 | – | 1 |
| UCLA | 4 | – | 4 | – | 0 | 7 | – | 5 | – | 0 |
| Arizona | 4 | – | 4 | – | 0 | 6 | – | 5 | – | 0 |
| Arizona State | 4 | – | 4 | – | 0 | 6 | – | 5 | – | 0 |
| California | 2 | – | 6 | – | 0 | 3 | – | 8 | – | 0 |
| Washington State | 2 | – | 6 | – | 0 | 3 | – | 8 | – | 0 |
| Oregon State | 0 | – | 8 | – | 0 | 1 | – | 10 | – | 0 |
+ – Conference co-champions; ^ – Rose Bowl representative per tie-breaking rules based on overall record, due to Washington-USC tie; Rankings from AP Poll

1996 Pacific-10 Conference football standings
| | Conf. | | | Overall |
| Team | W | | L | W | | L |
|---|---|---|---|---|---|---|
| No. 4 Arizona State $ | 8 | – | 0 | 11 | – | 1 |
| No. 16 Washington | 7 | – | 1 | 9 | – | 3 |
| Stanford | 5 | – | 3 | 7 | – | 5 |
| UCLA | 4 | – | 4 | 5 | – | 6 |
| Oregon | 3 | – | 5 | 6 | – | 5 |
| California | 3 | – | 5 | 6 | – | 6 |
| USC | 3 | – | 5 | 6 | – | 6 |
| Arizona | 3 | – | 5 | 5 | – | 6 |
| Washington State | 3 | – | 5 | 5 | – | 6 |
| Oregon State | 1 | – | 7 | 2 | – | 9 |
$ – Conference champion; Rankings from AP Poll

1997 Pacific-10 Conference football standings
| | Conf. | | | Overall |
| Team | W | | L | W | | L |
|---|---|---|---|---|---|---|
| No. 9 Washington State + | 7 | – | 1 | 10 | – | 2 |
| No. 5 UCLA + | 7 | – | 1 | 10 | – | 2 |
| No. 14 Arizona State | 6 | – | 2 | 9 | – | 3 |
| No. 18 Washington | 5 | – | 3 | 8 | – | 4 |
| Arizona | 4 | – | 4 | 7 | – | 5 |
| USC | 4 | – | 4 | 6 | – | 5 |
| Oregon | 3 | – | 5 | 7 | – | 5 |
| Stanford | 3 | – | 5 | 5 | – | 6 |
| California | 1 | – | 7 | 3 | – | 8 |
| Oregon State | 0 | – | 8 | 3 | – | 8 |
+ – Conference co-champions; Rankings from AP Poll

1998 Pacific-10 Conference football standings
| | Conf. | | | Overall |
| Team | W | | L | W | | L |
|---|---|---|---|---|---|---|
| No. 8 UCLA $ | 8 | – | 0 | 10 | – | 2 |
| No. 4 Arizona | 7 | – | 1 | 12 | – | 1 |
| Oregon | 5 | – | 3 | 8 | – | 4 |
| USC | 5 | – | 3 | 8 | – | 5 |
| Washington | 4 | – | 4 | 6 | – | 6 |
| Arizona State | 4 | – | 4 | 5 | – | 6 |
| California | 3 | – | 5 | 5 | – | 6 |
| Oregon State | 2 | – | 6 | 5 | – | 6 |
| Stanford | 2 | – | 6 | 3 | – | 8 |
| Washington State | 0 | – | 8 | 3 | – | 8 |
$ – BCS representative as conference champion; Rankings from AP Poll

1999 Pacific-10 Conference football standings
| | Conf. | | | Overall |
| Team | W | | L | W | | L |
|---|---|---|---|---|---|---|
| Stanford $ | 7 | – | 1 | 8 | – | 4 |
| No. 19 Oregon | 6 | – | 2 | 9 | – | 3 |
| Washington | 6 | – | 2 | 7 | – | 5 |
| Arizona State | 5 | – | 3 | 6 | – | 6 |
| Oregon State | 4 | – | 4 | 7 | – | 5 |
| Arizona | 3 | – | 5 | 6 | – | 6 |
| USC | 3 | – | 5 | 6 | – | 6 |
| California | 3 | – | 5 | 4 | – | 7 |
| UCLA | 2 | – | 6 | 4 | – | 7 |
| Washington State | 1 | – | 7 | 3 | – | 9 |
$ – BCS representative as conference champion; Cal later vacated 4 wins (3 in conference) due to NCAA sanctions.; Rankings from AP Poll

2000 Pacific-10 Conference football standings
| | Conf. | | | Overall |
| Team | W | | L | W | | L |
|---|---|---|---|---|---|---|
| No. 4 Oregon State %+ | 7 | – | 1 | 11 | – | 1 |
| No. 3 Washington $+ | 7 | – | 1 | 11 | – | 1 |
| No. 7 Oregon + | 7 | – | 1 | 10 | – | 2 |
| Stanford | 4 | – | 4 | 5 | – | 6 |
| UCLA | 3 | – | 5 | 6 | – | 6 |
| Arizona State | 3 | – | 5 | 6 | – | 6 |
| Arizona | 3 | – | 5 | 5 | – | 6 |
| USC | 2 | – | 6 | 5 | – | 7 |
| Washington State | 2 | – | 6 | 4 | – | 7 |
| California | 2 | – | 6 | 3 | – | 8 |
$ – BCS representative as conference champion; % – BCS at-large representative; + – Conference co-champions; Rankings from AP Poll

2001 Pacific-10 Conference football standings
| | Conf. | | | Overall |
| Team | W | | L | W | | L |
|---|---|---|---|---|---|---|
| No. 2 Oregon $ | 7 | – | 1 | 11 | – | 1 |
| No. 10 Washington State | 6 | – | 2 | 10 | – | 2 |
| No. 16 Stanford | 6 | – | 2 | 9 | – | 3 |
| No. 19 Washington | 6 | – | 2 | 8 | – | 4 |
| USC | 5 | – | 3 | 6 | – | 6 |
| UCLA | 4 | – | 4 | 7 | – | 4 |
| Oregon State | 3 | – | 5 | 5 | – | 6 |
| Arizona | 2 | – | 6 | 5 | – | 6 |
| Arizona State | 1 | – | 7 | 4 | – | 7 |
| California | 0 | – | 8 | 1 | – | 10 |
$ – Conference champion; Rankings from AP Poll

2002 Pacific-10 Conference football standings
| | Conf. | | | Overall |
| Team | W | | L | W | | L |
|---|---|---|---|---|---|---|
| No. 10 Washington State $+ | 7 | – | 1 | 10 | – | 3 |
| No. 4 USC %+ | 7 | – | 1 | 11 | – | 2 |
| Arizona State | 5 | – | 3 | 8 | – | 6 |
| Oregon State | 4 | – | 4 | 8 | – | 5 |
| UCLA | 4 | – | 4 | 8 | – | 5 |
| California | 4 | – | 4 | 7 | – | 5 |
| Washington | 4 | – | 4 | 7 | – | 6 |
| Oregon | 3 | – | 5 | 7 | – | 6 |
| Arizona | 1 | – | 7 | 4 | – | 8 |
| Stanford | 1 | – | 7 | 2 | – | 9 |
$ – BCS representative as conference champion; % – BCS at-large representative; + – Conference co-champions; Rankings from AP Poll

2003 Pacific-10 Conference football standings
| | Conf. | | | Overall |
| Team | W | | L | W | | L |
|---|---|---|---|---|---|---|
| No. 1 USC $ | 7 | – | 1 | 12 | – | 1 |
| No. 9 Washington State | 6 | – | 2 | 10 | – | 3 |
| Oregon | 5 | – | 3 | 8 | – | 5 |
| California | 5 | – | 3 | 8 | – | 6 |
| Oregon State | 4 | – | 4 | 8 | – | 5 |
| Washington | 4 | – | 4 | 6 | – | 6 |
| UCLA | 4 | – | 4 | 6 | – | 7 |
| Arizona State | 2 | – | 6 | 5 | – | 7 |
| Stanford | 2 | – | 6 | 4 | – | 7 |
| Arizona | 1 | – | 7 | 2 | – | 10 |
$ – Conference champion; Rankings from AP Poll

2004 Pacific-10 Conference football standings
| | Conf. | | | Overall |
| Team | W | | L | W | | L |
|---|---|---|---|---|---|---|
| No. 1 USC † $ | 8 | – | 0 | 13 | – | 0 |
| No. 9 California | 7 | – | 1 | 10 | – | 2 |
| No. 19 Arizona State | 5 | – | 3 | 9 | – | 3 |
| Oregon State | 5 | – | 3 | 7 | – | 5 |
| UCLA | 4 | – | 4 | 6 | – | 6 |
| Oregon | 4 | – | 4 | 5 | – | 6 |
| Washington State | 3 | – | 5 | 5 | – | 6 |
| Stanford | 2 | – | 6 | 4 | – | 7 |
| Arizona | 2 | – | 6 | 3 | – | 8 |
| Washington | 0 | – | 8 | 1 | – | 10 |
$ – Conference champion; † – USC later vacated 2 wins (1 in conference), as well as the BCS and Pac-10 championships, due to NCAA sanctions.; Rankings from AP Poll

2005 Pacific-10 Conference football standings
| | Conf. | | | Overall |
| Team | W | | L | W | | L |
|---|---|---|---|---|---|---|
| No. 2 USC † $ | 8 | – | 0 | 12 | – | 1 |
| No. 13 Oregon | 7 | – | 1 | 10 | – | 2 |
| No. 16 UCLA | 6 | – | 2 | 10 | – | 2 |
| No. 25 California | 4 | – | 4 | 8 | – | 4 |
| Arizona State | 4 | – | 4 | 7 | – | 5 |
| Stanford | 4 | – | 4 | 5 | – | 6 |
| Oregon State | 3 | – | 5 | 5 | – | 6 |
| Arizona | 2 | – | 6 | 3 | – | 8 |
| Washington State | 1 | – | 7 | 4 | – | 7 |
| Washington | 1 | – | 7 | 2 | – | 9 |
$ – Conference champion; † – USC later vacated 12 wins (8 in conference) and 1 loss due to NCAA sanctions.; Rankings from AP Poll

2006 Pacific-10 Conference football standings
| | Conf. | | | Overall |
| Team | W | | L | W | | L |
|---|---|---|---|---|---|---|
| No. 4 USC + | 7 | – | 2 | 11 | – | 2 |
| No. 14 California + | 7 | – | 2 | 10 | – | 3 |
| No. 21 Oregon State | 6 | – | 3 | 10 | – | 4 |
| UCLA | 5 | – | 4 | 7 | – | 6 |
| Arizona State | 4 | – | 5 | 7 | – | 6 |
| Oregon | 4 | – | 5 | 7 | – | 6 |
| Arizona | 4 | – | 5 | 6 | – | 6 |
| Washington State | 4 | – | 5 | 6 | – | 6 |
| Washington | 3 | – | 6 | 5 | – | 7 |
| Stanford | 1 | – | 8 | 1 | – | 11 |
+ – Conference co-champions; Rankings from AP Poll

2007 Pacific-10 Conference football standings
| | Conf. | | | Overall |
| Team | W | | L | W | | L |
|---|---|---|---|---|---|---|
| No. 3 USC + | 7 | – | 2 | 11 | – | 2 |
| No. 16 Arizona State + | 7 | – | 2 | 10 | – | 3 |
| No. 25 Oregon State | 6 | – | 3 | 9 | – | 4 |
| No. 23 Oregon | 5 | – | 4 | 9 | – | 4 |
| UCLA | 5 | – | 4 | 6 | – | 7 |
| Arizona | 4 | – | 5 | 5 | – | 7 |
| California | 3 | – | 6 | 7 | – | 6 |
| Washington State | 3 | – | 6 | 5 | – | 7 |
| Stanford | 3 | – | 6 | 4 | – | 8 |
| Washington | 2 | – | 7 | 4 | – | 9 |
+ – Conference co-champions; Rankings from AP Poll

2008 Pacific-10 Conference football standings
| | Conf. | | | Overall |
| Team | W | | L | W | | L |
|---|---|---|---|---|---|---|
| No. 3 USC $ | 8 | – | 1 | 12 | – | 1 |
| No. 10 Oregon | 7 | – | 2 | 10 | – | 3 |
| No. 18 Oregon State | 7 | – | 2 | 9 | – | 4 |
| California | 6 | – | 3 | 9 | – | 4 |
| Arizona | 5 | – | 4 | 8 | – | 5 |
| Arizona State | 4 | – | 5 | 5 | – | 7 |
| Stanford | 4 | – | 5 | 5 | – | 7 |
| UCLA | 3 | – | 6 | 4 | – | 8 |
| Washington State | 1 | – | 8 | 2 | – | 11 |
| Washington | 0 | – | 9 | 0 | – | 12 |
$ – Conference champion; Rankings from AP Poll

2009 Pacific-10 Conference football standings
| | Conf. | | | Overall |
| Team | W | | L | W | | L |
|---|---|---|---|---|---|---|
| No. 11 Oregon $ | 8 | – | 1 | 10 | – | 3 |
| Arizona | 6 | – | 3 | 8 | – | 5 |
| Oregon State | 6 | – | 3 | 8 | – | 5 |
| Stanford | 6 | – | 3 | 8 | – | 5 |
| No. 22 USC | 5 | – | 4 | 9 | – | 4 |
| California | 5 | – | 4 | 8 | – | 5 |
| Washington | 4 | – | 5 | 5 | – | 7 |
| UCLA | 3 | – | 6 | 7 | – | 6 |
| Arizona State | 2 | – | 7 | 4 | – | 8 |
| Washington State | 0 | – | 9 | 1 | – | 11 |
$ – BCS representative as conference champion; Rankings from AP Poll

2010 Pacific-10 Conference football standings
| | Conf. | | | Overall |
| Team | W | | L | W | | L |
|---|---|---|---|---|---|---|
| No. 3 Oregon $ | 9 | – | 0 | 12 | – | 1 |
| No. 4 Stanford % | 8 | – | 1 | 12 | – | 1 |
| USC † | 5 | – | 4 | 8 | – | 5 |
| Washington | 5 | – | 4 | 7 | – | 6 |
| Arizona | 4 | – | 5 | 7 | – | 6 |
| Arizona State | 4 | – | 5 | 6 | – | 6 |
| Oregon State | 4 | – | 5 | 5 | – | 7 |
| California | 3 | – | 6 | 5 | – | 7 |
| UCLA | 2 | – | 7 | 4 | – | 8 |
| Washington State | 1 | – | 8 | 2 | – | 10 |
$ – BCS representative as conference champion; % – BCS at-large representative; † – USC ineligible for championship and post-season due to NCAA sanctions; Rankings from AP Poll

=== Pac-12 era (2011–2023; 2026–present) ===
2011 Pac-12 Conference football standings
| | Conf. | | | Overall |
| Team | W | | L | W | | L |
|---|---|---|---|---|---|---|
North Division
| No. 4 Oregon xy$ | 8 | – | 1 | 12 | – | 2 |
| No. 7 Stanford x% | 8 | – | 1 | 11 | – | 2 |
| Washington | 5 | – | 4 | 7 | – | 6 |
| California | 4 | – | 5 | 7 | – | 6 |
| Oregon State | 3 | – | 6 | 3 | – | 9 |
| Washington State | 2 | – | 7 | 4 | – | 8 |
South Division
| No. 6 USC † | 7 | – | 2 | 10 | – | 2 |
| UCLA xy | 5 | – | 4 | 6 | – | 8 |
| Utah | 4 | – | 5 | 8 | – | 5 |
| Arizona State | 4 | – | 5 | 6 | – | 7 |
| Arizona | 2 | – | 7 | 4 | – | 8 |
| Colorado | 2 | – | 7 | 3 | – | 10 |
Championship: Oregon 49, UCLA 31
$ – BCS representative as conference champion; % – BCS at-large representative; x – Division champion/co-champions; y – Championship game participant; † – USC ineligible for championship and postseason due to NCAA sanctions; Rankings from AP Poll

2012 Pac-12 Conference football standings
| | Conf. | | | Overall |
| Team | W | | L | W | | L |
|---|---|---|---|---|---|---|
North Division
| No. 7 Stanford xy$ | 8 | – | 1 | 12 | – | 2 |
| No. 2 Oregon x% | 8 | – | 1 | 12 | – | 1 |
| No. 20 Oregon State | 6 | – | 3 | 9 | – | 4 |
| Washington | 5 | – | 4 | 7 | – | 6 |
| California | 2 | – | 7 | 3 | – | 9 |
| Washington State | 1 | – | 8 | 3 | – | 9 |
South Division
| UCLA xy | 6 | – | 3 | 9 | – | 5 |
| Arizona State | 5 | – | 4 | 8 | – | 5 |
| USC | 5 | – | 4 | 7 | – | 6 |
| Arizona | 4 | – | 5 | 8 | – | 5 |
| Utah | 3 | – | 6 | 5 | – | 7 |
| Colorado | 1 | – | 8 | 1 | – | 11 |
Championship: Stanford 27, UCLA 24
$ – BCS representative as conference champion; % – BCS at-large representative; x – Division champion/co-champions; y – Championship game participant; Rankings from AP Poll

2013 Pac-12 Conference football standings
| | Conf. | | | Overall |
| Team | W | | L | W | | L |
|---|---|---|---|---|---|---|
North Division
| No. 11 Stanford xy$ | 7 | – | 2 | 11 | – | 3 |
| No. 9 Oregon x | 7 | – | 2 | 11 | – | 2 |
| No. 25 Washington | 5 | – | 4 | 9 | – | 4 |
| Oregon State | 4 | – | 5 | 7 | – | 6 |
| Washington State | 4 | – | 5 | 6 | – | 7 |
| California | 0 | – | 9 | 1 | – | 11 |
South Division
| No. 21 Arizona State xy | 8 | – | 1 | 10 | – | 4 |
| No. 16 UCLA | 6 | – | 3 | 10 | – | 3 |
| No. 19 USC | 6 | – | 3 | 10 | – | 4 |
| Arizona | 4 | – | 5 | 8 | – | 5 |
| Utah | 2 | – | 7 | 5 | – | 7 |
| Colorado | 1 | – | 8 | 4 | – | 8 |
Championship: Stanford 38, Arizona State 14
$ – BCS representative as conference champion; x – Division champion/co-champions; y – Championship game participant; Rankings from AP Poll

2014 Pac-12 Conference football standings
| | Conf. | | | Overall |
| Team | W | | L | W | | L |
|---|---|---|---|---|---|---|
North Division
| No. 2 Oregon xy$^ | 8 | – | 1 | 13 | – | 2 |
| Stanford | 5 | – | 4 | 8 | – | 5 |
| Washington | 4 | – | 5 | 8 | – | 6 |
| California | 3 | – | 6 | 5 | – | 7 |
| Oregon State | 2 | – | 7 | 5 | – | 7 |
| Washington State | 2 | – | 7 | 3 | – | 9 |
South Division
| No. 19 Arizona xy | 7 | – | 2 | 10 | – | 4 |
| No. 10 UCLA | 6 | – | 3 | 10 | – | 3 |
| No. 12 Arizona State | 6 | – | 3 | 10 | – | 3 |
| No. 20 USC | 6 | – | 3 | 9 | – | 4 |
| No. 21 Utah | 5 | – | 4 | 9 | – | 4 |
| Colorado | 0 | – | 9 | 2 | – | 10 |
Championship: Oregon 51, Arizona 13
^ – College Football Playoff participant; $ – Conference champion; x – Division champion/co-champions; y – Championship game participant; Rankings from AP Poll

2015 Pac-12 Conference football standings
| | Conf. | | | Overall |
| Team | W | | L | W | | L |
|---|---|---|---|---|---|---|
North Division
| No. 3 Stanford xy$ | 8 | – | 1 | 12 | – | 2 |
| No. 19 Oregon | 7 | – | 2 | 9 | – | 4 |
| Washington State | 6 | – | 3 | 9 | – | 4 |
| California | 4 | – | 5 | 8 | – | 5 |
| Washington | 4 | – | 5 | 7 | – | 6 |
| Oregon State | 0 | – | 9 | 2 | – | 10 |
South Division
| USC xy | 6 | – | 3 | 8 | – | 6 |
| No. 17 Utah x | 6 | – | 3 | 10 | – | 3 |
| UCLA | 5 | – | 4 | 8 | – | 5 |
| Arizona State | 4 | – | 5 | 6 | – | 7 |
| Arizona | 3 | – | 6 | 7 | – | 6 |
| Colorado | 1 | – | 8 | 4 | – | 9 |
Championship: Stanford 41, USC 22
$ – Conference champion; x – Division champion/co-champions; y – Championship game participant; Rankings from AP Poll

2016 Pac-12 Conference football standings
| | Conf. | | | Overall |
| Team | W | | L | W | | L |
|---|---|---|---|---|---|---|
North Division
| No. 4 Washington xy$^ | 8 | – | 1 | 12 | – | 2 |
| Washington State | 7 | – | 2 | 8 | – | 5 |
| No. 12 Stanford | 6 | – | 3 | 10 | – | 3 |
| California | 3 | – | 6 | 5 | – | 7 |
| Oregon State | 3 | – | 6 | 4 | – | 8 |
| Oregon | 2 | – | 7 | 4 | – | 8 |
South Division
| No. 17 Colorado xy | 8 | – | 1 | 10 | – | 4 |
| No. 3 USC | 7 | – | 2 | 10 | – | 3 |
| No. 23 Utah | 5 | – | 4 | 9 | – | 4 |
| Arizona State | 2 | – | 7 | 5 | – | 7 |
| UCLA | 2 | – | 7 | 4 | – | 8 |
| Arizona | 1 | – | 8 | 3 | – | 9 |
Championship: Washington 41, Colorado 10
^ – College Football Playoff participant; $ – Conference champion; x – Division champion/co-champions; y – Championship game participant; Rankings from AP Poll

2017 Pac-12 Conference football standings
| | Conf. | | | Overall |
| Team | W | | L | W | | L |
|---|---|---|---|---|---|---|
North Division
| No. 20 Stanford xy | 7 | – | 2 | 9 | – | 5 |
| No. 16 Washington x | 7 | – | 2 | 10 | – | 3 |
| Washington State | 6 | – | 3 | 9 | – | 4 |
| Oregon | 4 | – | 5 | 7 | – | 6 |
| California | 2 | – | 7 | 5 | – | 7 |
| Oregon State | 0 | – | 9 | 1 | – | 11 |
South Division
| No. 12 USC xy$ | 8 | – | 1 | 11 | – | 3 |
| Arizona State | 6 | – | 3 | 7 | – | 6 |
| Arizona | 5 | – | 4 | 7 | – | 6 |
| UCLA | 4 | – | 5 | 6 | – | 7 |
| Utah | 3 | – | 6 | 7 | – | 6 |
| Colorado | 2 | – | 7 | 5 | – | 7 |
Championship: USC 31, Stanford 28
$ – Conference champion; x – Division champion/co-champions; y – Championship game participant; Rankings from AP Poll

2018 Pac-12 Conference football standings
| | Conf. | | | Overall |
| Team | W | | L | W | | L |
|---|---|---|---|---|---|---|
North Division
| No. 13 Washington xy$ | 7 | – | 2 | 10 | – | 4 |
| No. 10 Washington State x | 7 | – | 2 | 11 | – | 2 |
| Stanford | 6 | – | 3 | 9 | – | 4 |
| Oregon | 5 | – | 4 | 9 | – | 4 |
| California | 4 | – | 5 | 7 | – | 6 |
| Oregon State | 1 | – | 8 | 2 | – | 10 |
South Division
| Utah xy | 6 | – | 3 | 9 | – | 5 |
| Arizona State | 5 | – | 4 | 7 | – | 6 |
| USC | 4 | – | 5 | 5 | – | 7 |
| Arizona | 4 | – | 5 | 5 | – | 7 |
| UCLA | 3 | – | 6 | 3 | – | 9 |
| Colorado | 2 | – | 7 | 5 | – | 7 |
Championship: Washington 10, Utah 3
$ – Conference champion; x – Division champion/co-champions; y – Championship game participant; Rankings from AP Poll

2019 Pac-12 Conference football standings
| | Conf. | | | Overall |
| Team | W | | L | W | | L |
|---|---|---|---|---|---|---|
North Division
| No. 5 Oregon xy$ | 8 | – | 1 | 12 | – | 2 |
| California | 4 | – | 5 | 8 | – | 5 |
| Washington | 4 | – | 5 | 8 | – | 5 |
| Oregon State | 4 | – | 5 | 5 | – | 7 |
| Washington State | 3 | – | 6 | 6 | – | 7 |
| Stanford | 3 | – | 6 | 4 | – | 8 |
South Division
| No. 16 Utah xy | 8 | – | 1 | 11 | – | 3 |
| USC | 7 | – | 2 | 8 | – | 5 |
| Arizona State | 4 | – | 5 | 8 | – | 5 |
| UCLA | 4 | – | 5 | 4 | – | 8 |
| Colorado | 3 | – | 6 | 5 | – | 7 |
| Arizona | 2 | – | 7 | 4 | – | 8 |
Championship: Oregon 37, Utah 15
$ – Conference champion; x – Division champion/co-champions; y – Championship game participant; Rankings from AP Poll

2020 Pac-12 Conference football standings
| | Conf. | | | Overall |
| Team | W | | L | W | | L |
|---|---|---|---|---|---|---|
North Division
| Washington x | 3 | – | 1 | 3 | – | 1 |
| Oregon y$ | 3 | – | 2 | 4 | – | 3 |
| Stanford | 4 | – | 2 | 4 | – | 2 |
| California | 1 | – | 3 | 1 | – | 3 |
| Washington State | 1 | – | 3 | 1 | – | 3 |
| Oregon State | 2 | – | 5 | 2 | – | 5 |
South Division
| No. 21 USC xy | 5 | – | 0 | 5 | – | 1 |
| Colorado | 3 | – | 1 | 4 | – | 2 |
| Utah | 3 | – | 2 | 3 | – | 2 |
| Arizona State | 2 | – | 2 | 2 | – | 2 |
| UCLA | 3 | – | 4 | 3 | – | 4 |
| Arizona | 0 | – | 5 | 0 | – | 5 |
Championship: Oregon 31, USC 24
$ – Conference champion; x – Division champion/co-champions; y – Championship game participant; Note: Due to COVID-19, the Pac-12 suspended the season on August 11, but later decided to begin play on November 6. In addition to the title game on December 18, the conference seeded all remaining teams for a game during that weekend.; Rankings from AP Poll.

2021 Pac-12 Conference football standings
| | Conf. | | | Overall |
| Team | W | | L | W | | L |
|---|---|---|---|---|---|---|
North Division
| No. 22 Oregon xy | 7 | – | 2 | 10 | – | 4 |
| Washington State | 6 | – | 3 | 7 | – | 6 |
| Oregon State | 5 | – | 4 | 7 | – | 6 |
| California | 4 | – | 5 | 5 | – | 7 |
| Washington | 3 | – | 6 | 4 | – | 8 |
| Stanford | 2 | – | 7 | 3 | – | 9 |
South Division
| No. 12 Utah xy$ | 8 | – | 1 | 10 | – | 4 |
| UCLA | 6 | – | 3 | 8 | – | 4 |
| Arizona State† | 0 | – | 3 | 0 | – | 5 |
| USC | 3 | – | 6 | 4 | – | 8 |
| Colorado | 3 | – | 6 | 4 | – | 8 |
| Arizona | 1 | – | 8 | 1 | – | 11 |
Championship: Utah 38, Oregon 10
$ – Conference champion; x – Division champion/co-champions; y – Championship game participant; Rankings from AP Poll

2022 Pac-12 Conference football standings
| | Conf. | | | Overall |
| Team | W | | L | W | | L |
|---|---|---|---|---|---|---|
| No. 12 USC y | 8 | – | 1 | 11 | – | 3 |
| No. 10 Utah y$ | 7 | – | 2 | 10 | – | 4 |
| No. 8 Washington | 7 | – | 2 | 11 | – | 2 |
| No. 15 Oregon | 7 | – | 2 | 10 | – | 3 |
| No. 17 Oregon State | 6 | – | 3 | 10 | – | 3 |
| No. 21 UCLA | 6 | – | 3 | 9 | – | 4 |
| Washington State | 4 | – | 5 | 7 | – | 6 |
| Arizona | 3 | – | 6 | 5 | – | 7 |
| California | 2 | – | 7 | 4 | – | 8 |
| Arizona State† | 1 | – | 7 | 1 | – | 9 |
| Stanford | 1 | – | 8 | 3 | – | 9 |
| Colorado | 1 | – | 8 | 1 | – | 11 |
Championship: Utah 47, USC 24
$ – Conference champion; y – Championship game participant; Rankings from AP Poll

2023 Pac-12 Conference football standings
| | Conf. | | | Overall |
| Team | W | | L | W | | L |
|---|---|---|---|---|---|---|
| No. 2 Washington y$^ | 9 | – | 0 | 14 | – | 1 |
| No. 6 Oregon y | 8 | – | 1 | 12 | – | 2 |
| No. 11 Arizona | 7 | – | 2 | 10 | – | 3 |
| Oregon State | 5 | – | 4 | 8 | – | 5 |
| Utah | 5 | – | 4 | 8 | – | 5 |
| USC | 5 | – | 4 | 8 | – | 5 |
| California | 4 | – | 5 | 6 | – | 7 |
| UCLA | 4 | – | 5 | 8 | – | 5 |
| Washington State | 2 | – | 7 | 5 | – | 7 |
| Stanford | 2 | – | 7 | 3 | – | 9 |
| Arizona State* | 2 | – | 7 | 3 | – | 9 |
| Colorado | 1 | – | 8 | 4 | – | 8 |
Championship: Washington 34, Oregon 31
^ – College Football Playoff participant; $ – Conference champion; y – Championship game participant; * – Ineligible for postseason play due to self-imposed ban for 2020 recruiting violations; Rankings from AP Poll

2026 Pac-12 Conference football standings
| | Conf. | | | Overall |
| Team | W | | L | W | | L |
|---|---|---|---|---|---|---|
| Colorado State | 0 | – | 0 | 1 | – | 0 |
| San Diego State | 0 | – | 0 | 1 | – | 0 |
| Boise State | 0 | – | 0 | 0 | – | 1 |
| Fresno State | 0 | – | 0 | 0 | – | 1 |
| Oregon State | 0 | – | 0 | 0 | – | 1 |
| Texas State | 0 | – | 0 | 0 | – | 1 |
| Utah State | 0 | – | 0 | 0 | – | 1 |
| Washington State | 0 | – | 0 | 0 | – | 1 |
Championship: December 4, 2026
As of September 7, 2026; Rankings from AP poll

=== Pac-2 era (2024–2025) ===
2024 Pac-12 Conference football standings
| | Conf. | | | Overall |
| Team | W | | L | W | | L |
|---|---|---|---|---|---|---|
| Oregon State | 1 | – | 0 | 5 | – | 7 |
| Washington State | 0 | – | 1 | 8 | – | 5 |

2025 Pac-12 Conference football standings
| | Conf. | | | Overall |
| Team | W | | L | W | | L |
|---|---|---|---|---|---|---|
| Washington State | 1 | – | 0 | 7 | – | 6 |
| Oregon State | 0 | – | 1 | 2 | – | 10 |
Rankings from CFP Rankings
