= Chicago Tribune Fans' Poll =

Defunct college football poll

The Chicago Tribune Fans' Poll was a weekly ranking of the top 20 NCAA college football teams. The poll was published in the Chicago Tribune and tabulated from weekly ballots clipped from the newspaper and mailed in by its readership. The No. 1 team in the final Fans' Poll was the paper's college football national champion and was awarded the silver Tribune Trophy.

== National champions ==
The Chicago Tribune Fans' Poll selected the following college football national champions:

Season	Champion	Record
1980	Georgia	12–0
1981	Clemson	12–0
1982	Penn State	11–1
1983	Nebraska	12–1
1984	Washington	11–1
1985	Oklahoma	11–1
1986	Penn State	12–0

=== Tribune Trophy ===
The No. 1 team in the final Fans' Poll rankings was awarded the Tribune Trophy. The trophy took the form of a silver football mounted on a walnut base.
