= 1984 All-Pacific-10 Conference football team =

The 1984 All-Pacific-10 Conference football team consists of American football players chosen by various organizations for All-Pacific-10 Conference teams for the 1984 college football season.

== Offensive selections ==
=== Quarterbacks ===
- Mark Rypien, Washington St. (Coaches-1)
- Gale Gilbert, California (Coaches-2)

=== Running backs ===
- Rueben Mayes, Washington St. (Coaches-1)
- Darryl Clack, Arizona St. (Coaches-1)
- Fred Crutcher, USC (Coaches-1)
- Brad Muster, Stanford (Coaches-2)
- Jacque Robinson, Washington (Coaches-2)
- David Adams, Arizona (Coaches-2)

=== Wide receivers ===
- Lew Barnes, Oregon (Coaches-1)
- Reggie Bynum, Oregon St. (Coaches-1)
- Doug Allen, Arizona St. (Coaches-2)
- Mike Young, UCLA (Coaches-2)

=== Tight ends ===
- Doug Herman, Oregon (Coaches-1)
- Joe Cormier, USC (Coaches-2)

=== Tackles ===
- Mark Shupe, Arizona St. (Coaches-1)
- Brent Martin, Stanford (Coaches-1)
- Tom Magazzeni, Arizona St. (Coaches-2)
- Greg Schwab, Oregon (Coaches-2)

=== Guards ===
- Duval Love, UCLA (Coaches-1)
- Ken Ruettgers, USC (Coaches-1)
- Kirk Samuelson, Washington St. (Coaches-2)
- Jeff Bregel, USC (Coaches-2)
- Charlie Dickey, Arizona (Coaches-2)

=== Centers ===
- Dan Lynch, Washington St. (Coaches-1)

== Defensive selections ==
=== Linemen ===
- Ron Holmes, Washington (Coaches-1)
- Garin Veris, Stanford (Coaches-1)
- David Wood, Arizona (Coaches-1)
- Tony Colorito, USC (Coaches-1)
- Joe Drake, Arizona (Coaches-2)
- Angelo Dilulo, Oregon St. (Coaches-2)
- John Gonzalez, Oregon St. (Coaches-2)
- Dan Saleaumus, Washington St. (Coaches-2)

=== Linebackers ===
- Duane Bickett, USC (Coaches-1)
- Tim Meamber, Washington (Coaches-1)
- Lamonte Hunley, Arizona (Coaches-1)
- Fred Small, Washington (Coaches-1)
- Tommy Taylor, UCLA (Coaches-1)
- Lee Blakeney, Washington St. (Coaches-2)
- Steve Boadway, Arizona (Coaches-2)
- Jack Del Rio, USC (Coaches-2)
- Dave Wyman, Stanford (Coaches-2)
- Hardy Nickerson, California (Coaches-2)

=== Defensive backs ===
- David Fulcher, Arizona St. (Coaches-1)
- Allan Durden, Arizona (Coaches-1)
- Tommy Haynes, USC (Coaches-1)
- Doug Judge, Oregon (Coaches-1)
- Ken Taylor, Oregon St. (Coaches-2)
- Vestee Jackson, Washington (Coaches-2)
- Tim McDonald, USC (Coaches-2)
- Jim Rodgers, Washington (Coaches-2)

== Special teams ==
=== Placekickers ===
- John Lee, UCLA (Coaches-1)
- Luis Zendejas, Oregon (Coaches-2)

=== Punters ===
- Kevin Buenafe, UCLA (Coaches-1)
- Jim Meyer, Arizona St. (Coaches-2)

=== Return specialists ===
- Tony Cherry, Oregon (Coaches-1)
- David Adams, Arizona (Coaches-2)

== See also ==
- 1984 College Football All-America Team
