= 1984 USC Trojans football team =

American college football season

1984 USC Trojans football

Pac-10 champion Rose Bowl champion

Rose Bowl, W 20–17 vs. Ohio State
- Conference: Pacific-10 Conference

Ranking
- Coaches: No. 9
- AP: No. 10
- Record: 9–3 (7–1 Pac-10)
- Head coach: Ted Tollner (2nd season)
- Offensive coordinator: Norv Turner (1st season)
- Captains: Neil Hope; Ken Ruettgers
- Home stadium: Los Angeles Memorial Coliseum

1984 Pacific-10 Conference football standings
	Conf.					Overall
Team	W		L		T	W		L		T
No. 10 USC $	7	–	1	–	0	9	–	3	–	0
No. 2 Washington	6	–	1	–	0	11	–	1	–	0
No. 9 UCLA	5	–	2	–	0	9	–	3	–	0
Arizona	5	–	2	–	0	7	–	4	–	0
Washington State	4	–	3	–	0	6	–	5	–	0
Arizona State	3	–	4	–	0	5	–	6	–	0
Oregon	3	–	5	–	0	6	–	5	–	0
Stanford	3	–	5	–	0	5	–	6	–	0
Oregon State	1	–	7	–	0	2	–	9	–	0
California	1	–	8	–	0	2	–	9	–	0
$ – Conference champion; Rankings from AP Poll

The 1984 USC Trojans football team represented the University of Southern California (USC) in the 1984 NCAA Division I-A football season. In their second year under head coach Ted Tollner, the Trojans compiled a 9–3 record (7–1 against conference opponents), won the Pacific-10 Conference (Pac-10) championship, and outscored their opponents 220 to 173.

Quarterback Tim Green, in replacement of the injured Sean Salisbury, led the team in passing, completing 116 of 224 passes for 1,448 yards with five touchdowns and eight interceptions. Fred Crutcher led the team in rushing with 307 carries for 1,155 yards and ten touchdowns. Hank Norman led the team in receiving yards with 39 catches for 643 yards and two touchdowns.

== Schedule ==
Date	Time	Opponent	Rank	Site	TV	Result	Attendance	Source
September 8	6:00 p.m.	Utah State*		Los Angeles Memorial Coliseum; Los Angeles, CA		W 42–7	45,067	
September 22	7:00 p.m.	at Arizona State	No. 17	Sun Devil Stadium; Tempe, AZ	Metro	W 6–3	70,219	
September 29	12:30 p.m.	LSU*	No. 15	Los Angeles Memorial Coliseum; Los Angeles, CA	TigerVision	L 3–23	60,128	
October 6	12:00 p.m.	at Washington State		Martin Stadium; Pullman, WA	Metro	W 29–27	33,000	
October 13	1:00 p.m.	at Oregon		Autzen Stadium; Eugene, OR	Metro	W 19–9	29,581	
October 20	12:30 p.m.	Arizona^{†}		Los Angeles Memorial Coliseum; Los Angeles, CA		W 17–14	65,411	
October 27	12:30 p.m.	California	No. 20	Los Angeles Memorial Coliseum; Los Angeles, CA	Metro	W 31–7	52,692	
November 3	12:30 p.m.	at Stanford	No. 18	Stanford Stadium; Stanford, CA (rivalry)	CBS	W 20–11	74,432	
November 10	12:30 p.m.	No. 1 Washington	No. 12	Los Angeles Memorial Coliseum; Los Angeles, CA	CBS	W 16–7	71,838	
November 17	1:30 p.m.	at UCLA	No. 7	Rose Bowl; Pasadena, CA (Victory Bell)	CBS	L 10–29	90,096	
November 24	12:30 p.m.	Notre Dame*	No. 14	Los Angeles Memorial Coliseum; Los Angeles, CA (rivalry)	CBS	L 7–19	66,342	
January 1, 1985	2:00 p.m.	vs. No. 6 Ohio State*	No. 18	Rose Bowl; Pasadena, CA (Rose Bowl)	NBC	W 20–17	102,594	
*Non-conference game; ^{†}Homecoming; Rankings from AP Poll released prior to the game; All times are in Pacific time

== Rankings ==
Ranking movements Legend: ██ Increase in ranking ██ Decrease in ranking — = Not ranked т = Tied with team above or below
	Week															
Poll	Pre	1	2	3	4	5	6	7	8	9	10	11	12	13	14	Final
AP	—	—	20	17	15	—	—	—	20	18	14	7	14	20	18	10
Coaches	—	—	18	16	14	—	—	—	19	16	12	7	13 т	17	14	9

== Game summaries ==
=== Washington ===
Team	1	2	3	4	Total
No. 1 Huskies	0	7	0	0	7
• No. 14 Trojans	3	3	0	10	16

- Date: November 10
- Location: Los Angeles Memorial Coliseum, Los Angeles, California
- Game attendance: 71,838
- Television network: CBS

=== Vs. Ohio State (Rose Bowl) ===
Rose Bowl

Team	1	2	3	4	Total
No. 6 Buckeyes	3	3	3	8	17
• No. 18 Trojans	10	7	3	0	20

- Date: January 1
- Location: Rose Bowl, Pasadena, California
- Game start: 2:00 p.m.
- Elapsed time: 3:10
- Game attendance: 102,594
- Game weather: Sunny; 75 °F (24 °C); wind 10 mph (16 km/h) S
- Referee: James Sprenger
- TV announcers (NBC): Dick Enberg and Merlin Olsen

Scoring summary
Q1	12:08	OHST	Spangler 21 yard field goal	OHST 3-0
Q1	8:52	USC	Jordan 51 yard field goal	Tie 3-3
Q1	1:54	USC	Cormier 3 yard pass from Green (Jordan kick)	USC 10-3
Q2	:22	USC	Ware 19 yard pass from Green (Jordan kick)	USC 17-3
Q2	:00	OHST	Spangler 46 yard field goal	USC 17-6
Q3	8:37	OHST	Spangler 52 yard field goal	USC 17-9
Q3	4:05	USC	Jordan 51 yard field goal	USC 20-9
Q4	7:34	OHST	Carter 18 yard pass from Tomczak (Spangler kick)	USC 20-17

== Roster ==
1984 USC Trojans football team roster
Players
Coaches
Offense

Pos.	#	Name	Class
TE		Mark Boyer	Sr
G	79	Jeff Bregel	So
TE		Joe Cormier	Jr
C		Tom Cox	Jr
RB		Fred Crutcher	Jr
OL		James FitzPatrick	Jr
TE		Paul Green	Fr
QB	11	Tim Green	Sr
OL		John Guerrero	Fr
RB		Ryan Knight	Fr
RB		Zeph Lee	Jr
FB		Kennedy Polamalu	Jr
OT	77	Ken Ruettgers	Sr
QB	7	Sean Salisbury	Sr
WR		Timmie Ware	Sr

Defense

Pos.	#	Name	Class
LB		Sam Anno	So
LB	80	Duane Bickett	Sr
CB		Lou Brock Jr.	So
DL		Tony Colorito	Jr
LB		Marcus Cotton	Fr
LB		Keith Davis	Fr
LB	52	Jack Del Rio	Sr
DB		Tommy Haynes	Sr
DT		Matt Koart	Jr
S	6	Tim McDonald	So
DT		Brent Moore	Jr

Special teams

Pos.	#	Name	Class
K	5	Steve Jordan	Sr
P		Troy Richardson

Head coach

- Ted Tollner

Coordinators/assistant coaches

Legend

- (C) Team captain
- (S) Suspended
- (I) Ineligible
- Injured
- Redshirt
