= Dan Lynch (American football) =

American football player (born 1962)

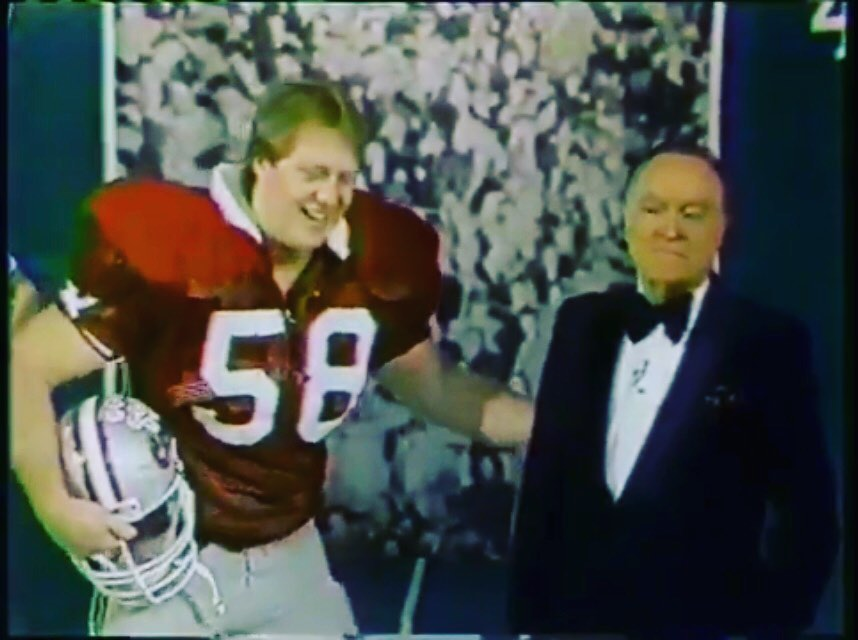

No. 58
- Position: Offensive Guard

Personal information
- Born: June 21, 1962 (age 64); Rochester, Minnesota, U.S.
- Listed height: 6 ft 4 in (1.93 m)
- Listed weight: 275 lb (125 kg)

Career information
- High school: Lewis and Clark (Spokane, Washington)
- College: Washington State
- NFL draft: 1985: 12th round, 334th overall pick

Career history
- Denver Broncos (1985)*
- * Offseason or practice squad member only

Awards and highlights
- Consensus All-American (1984); 2nd Team All-American 1983; Unanimous Morris Trophy (1984); 2× First-team All-Pac-10 (1983, 1984); WSU Hall of Fame 2006

Daniel Lynch (born June 21, 1962) is a former college and professional American football offensive guard; he attended Washington State University and was selected in the NFL draft by the Denver Broncos; he was inducted to the WSU athletic Hall of Fame in 2006. Lynch went on to a career in the private equity industry in Central and Eastern Europe.

== Football career ==
Lynch attended Lewis and Clark High School in Spokane, Washington. From 1980 to 1984, he played college football for the Washington State Cougars, where he started for four years and played in 57 games for the Cougars. After completing his senior season with the 1983 Cougars and was named 1st Team All-Pac 10, 2nd Team All-American (Sporting News) and played in the January 1984 Senior Bowl all-star game, and was subsequently granted an extra year of eligibility and played for the 1984 Cougars.

In 1984, Lynch was elected team captain and 1984 First Team All-American, and unanimously won the Morris Trophy as the Pac-10's top offensive lineman. He was also on the 1984 Bob Hope Christmas Special with the AP All-American team. Lynch played in the East–West Shrine Game, and became the first (and to date only) player to appear in a second Senior Bowl in 1985.

Lynch was also a three-time Academic All-American. In 2015, a panel of experts commissioned by The Spokesman-Review named Lynch to the all-time WSU team.

Lynch is known for a memorable remark before the 1984 Apple Cup against the rival Washington Huskies, "There are four important stages in your life. You're born, you play the Huskies, you get married and you die."

Lynch was drafted by the Denver Broncos of the National Football League (NFL) in the 1985 NFL draft. During pre-season, he started to suffer from Addison's disease, which saw his weight drop from 275 pounds (125 kg) to 225 pounds (102 kg); he ended up in an intensive care unit, where his weight further dropped to 170 pounds (77 kg). While he was with the Broncos in pre-season, he didn't play in a regular season NFL game. Due to his illness, Lynch retired from football.

== Personal life ==
After retiring from football, Lynch completed an MBA at the Haas School of Business at the University of California at Berkeley. He moved to work in the private equity industry in Central and Eastern Europe, residing first in Budapest, Hungary and then in Prague, Czech Republic. In addition to English, he speaks Hungarian and Czech.
