= Fred Small (American football) =

American football player (1963–2003)

No. 54
- Position: Linebacker

Personal information
- Born: July 15, 1963; Los Angeles, California, U.S.
- Died: June 24, 2003 (aged 39); Pomona, California, U.S.
- Listed height: 5 ft 11 in (1.80 m)
- Listed weight: 227 lb (103 kg)

Career information
- High school: John C. Fremont (Los Angeles, California)
- College: Washington
- NFL draft: 1985: 9th round, 241st overall pick

Career history
- Pittsburgh Steelers (1985)

Awards and highlights
- First-team All-Pac-10 (1984)
- Stats at Pro Football Reference

John Frederick Small (July 15, 1963 – June 24, 2003) was an American professional football player who played for the Pittsburgh Steelers of the National Football League (NFL) in 1985.

Born and raised in Los Angeles, Small graduated from John C. Fremont High School in 1981. He played college football at the University of Washington in Seattle under head coach Don James. An outside linebacker in his senior season in 1984, the Huskies won the Orange Bowl and were second in the final rankings. Small was selected in the ninth round of the 1985 NFL draft by the Steelers.

After leaving football, he became a police officer in southern California and joined the Inglewood Police Department in 1998. While on duty on his police motorcycle, he was involved in a late night three-vehicle collision on the Pomona Freeway, and died from his injuries at age 39 at Pomona Valley Hospital. He was survived by his wife and four children.
