= Fred Crutcher =

American football running back

Personal information
- Listed height: 5 ft 10 in (1.78 m)
- Listed weight: 195 lb (88 kg)

Career information
- High school: Blair (Pasadena, California)
- College: USC (1981–1985)

Awards and highlights
- First-team All-Pac-10 (1984); Second-team All-Pac-10 (1985)

Fred Crutcher (born ) is an American former football tailback. He played for the USC Trojans from 1981 to 1985. He tore ligaments in his left knee in 1982 and was slowed by the injury in 1983. He was the lead running back for the 1984 team, totaling 1,155 rushing yards and 10 touchdowns. He was described as "a pounding type who endures punishment and is always heading upfield, but seldom breaks long runs." He became known by the nickname "Four-Yard Freddie". In five years at USC, he totaled 2,815 rushing yards and scored 21 touchdowns.
