= James FitzPatrick (American football) =

German gridiron football player (born 1964)

No. 70, 73
- Position: Offensive tackle

Personal information
- Born: February 1, 1964 (age 62); Heidelberg, Germany
- Listed height: 6 ft 8 in (2.03 m)
- Listed weight: 305 lb (138 kg)

Career information
- High school: Beaverton (Beaverton, Oregon, U.S.)
- College: USC
- NFL draft: 1986: 1st round, 13th overall pick

Career history
- San Diego Chargers (1986–1989); Los Angeles Raiders (1990–1991)

Awards and highlights
- First-team All-American (1985); First-team All-Pac-10 (1985)

Career NFL statistics
- Games played: 65
- Games started: 19
- Stats at Pro Football Reference

James Joseph FitzPatrick, III (born February 1, 1964) is an American former professional football player who was an offensive tackle for six seasons in the National Football League (NFL).

Fitzpatrick was born in Heidelberg, Germany. He began his football career in Beaverton, Oregon where he was a two way starter for the State Champion Beaverton High School Beavers.

He attended USC (University Of Southern California), where he played in the 1985 Rose Bowl against Ohio State, defeating them 20–17. As a senior, he was selected as the team's Offensive Player of the Year, and was named a first team All-American.

He was selected in the first round (13th overall) by the San Diego Chargers in the 1986 NFL draft. He played four seasons for the Chargers. He was traded to the then Los Angeles Raiders in 1990 where he returned to the Colosseum for the remainder of his career.

James now lives in Portland, Oregon, he is active in youth football.
