= Tim Meamber =

American football player (born 1962)

No. 42, 53
- Position: Linebacker

Personal information
- Born: October 29, 1962 (age 64); Yreka, California, U.S.
- Listed height: 6 ft 3 in (1.91 m)
- Listed weight: 231 lb (105 kg)

Career information
- High school: Yreka (CA)
- College: Washington
- NFL draft: 1985: 3rd round, 60th overall pick

Career history
- Minnesota Vikings (1985); Los Angeles Rams (1987)*
- * Offseason or practice squad member only

Awards and highlights
- Second-team All-American (1984); First-team All-Pac-10 (1984)

Career NFL statistics
- Games played: 4
- Stats at Pro Football Reference

Tim Meamber (born October 29, 1962) is an American former professional football player who was a linebacker for the Minnesota Vikings in the National Football League (NFL). He was selected by the Vikings in the third round of the 1985 NFL draft with the 60th overall pick. He played college football at the University of Washington and was a member of the 11-1 1984 team who beat Oklahoma in the Orange Bowl. He finished his career at Washington as a team captain.

== See also ==
- Washington Huskies football statistical leaders
