= Ron Pitts =

American football player and sportscaster (born 1962)

No. 27, 28
- Position: Cornerback

Personal information
- Born: October 14, 1962 (age 64); Sterling Heights, Michigan, U.S.
- Listed height: 5 ft 10 in (1.78 m)
- Listed weight: 175 lb (79 kg)

Career information
- High school: Orchard Park (Orchard Park, New York)
- College: UCLA
- NFL draft: 1985: 7th round, 169th overall pick

Career history
- Buffalo Bills (1985–1987); Green Bay Packers (1988–1990)

Career NFL statistics
- Games played: 66
- Games started: 6
- Interceptions: 7
- Stats at Pro Football Reference

Ronald Dwayne Pitts (born October 14, 1962) is an American former professional football player and current sportscaster. He played cornerback in the National Football League for the Buffalo Bills and Green Bay Packers, and played college football at UCLA.

Pitts has worked as a sportscaster and entertainment reporter, and currently works for CBS Sports Network on its college football coverage as a fill-in play-by-play announcer, and as a co-host for the syndicated news magazine OK!TV.

== Early life and education ==
Born in Sterling Heights and raised in Detroit, Pitts is the son of Elijah Pitts, a running back with Vince Lombardi's Green Bay Packers and later a longtime assistant coach in the NFL. The family lived in southern California in the mid-1970s and moved to the Buffalo area in 1978, where he played football at Orchard Park High School and graduated in 1981. Ron's high school football career earned him a nomination for the Connolly Cup in 1979 and 1980.

Pitts played college football back in southern California at UCLA under head coach Terry Donahue. Following his senior season in 1984, he played in the Japan Bowl in January, where he intercepted a Mike Tomczak pass late in the game and returned it 99 yards for a touchdown to seal the win for the West team.

== Playing career ==
Pitts was selected in the seventh round of the 1985 NFL draft and had a brief playing career in which he played for the Buffalo Bills and the Green Bay Packers. Injured in his first mini-camp, he missed the 1985 season. From 1986 to 1990, Pitts played 66 games at defensive back, starting six times. He had seven career interceptions. One of Pitts's interceptions came off of San Francisco 49ers hall of famer Jerry Rice. In December 1988, he returned a punt for a touchdown against the Phoenix Cardinals.

== Broadcasting career ==
After retiring as a player, Pitts pursued a career in broadcasting. Pitts first joined the newly-formed Fox Sports in 1994. Pitts served as an analyst alongside Kenny Albert (1994), Thom Brennaman (1995–1997) and Ray Bentley (1998–2000). Then, in 2001, Pitts was promoted to lead sideline reporter for the final season of the Pat Summerall and John Madden pairing. Pitts was then placed back into the booth calling play-by-play of games working alongside Dwight Clark(2002), Marv Levy (2002), John Jurkovic (2002), Dave Krieg (2002), Tim Ryan (2003–2005), Terry Donahue (2006), J.C. Pearson (2006), Jesse Palmer (2006), Tony Boselli (2007–2008), John Lynch (2009–2010), Jim Mora (2011) & Mike Martz (2012). Following 19 years calling games as analyst, sideline reporter & play-by-play announcer, Pitts left Fox Sports following the 2012 NFL season and was later replaced by Kevin Burkhardt. He also co-hosted Under the Helmet (a weekly E/I program full of NFL-related segments for younger viewers) and former Fox Sports Net programs Total Access (whose name was later adopted by NFL Network for its own newscast) and Hardcore Football.

Earlier in his broadcasting career, Pitts worked as a college football analyst for ABC Sports and a correspondent for Black Entertainment Television. In 2014, Pitts joined CBS Sports Network as a play-by-play announcer doing a limited number of games

=== Acting career ===
Pitts also had a cameo as a sports commentator in the film Hot Shots! Part Deux. He also appears as an alternate version of himself during the "Eggheads" episode of the American TV series Sliders. He is also mentioned in the 1984 Alex Cox movie Repo Man, in a college football radio broadcast heard in the background as the robbers bungle their way out of a store and just before the main characters walk in. He played a TV Reporter in a speaking role in the 1996 film The Birdcage.

Pitts' voice was featured as an announcer in Microsoft's NFL Fever, a football video game for the original Xbox.

In 2008, Pitts was hired to host a new show on the Discovery Channel named Destroyed In Seconds. The show features video clips of disasters, accidents, and other destructive events, both natural and man-made.

== Personal life ==
His father, Elijah Pitts (1938–1998), was a running back for the Packers and was part of all five NFL championship teams under Lombardi, including the first two Super Bowls. Ron Pitts is mentioned briefly as one of several players' children who visited the Packers' locker room in Jerry Kramer's diary of the 1967 season, Instant Replay.

He has two sons named Lee and Shea, who both currently play college football.

His older son, Lee Pitts, is a defensive back at Azusa Pacific University, while his younger son, Shea Pitts, is a defensive back at his father's alma mater UCLA. Shea wears #47, as his Father did, at UCLA.

His sister, Kimberly R. Pitts, DO, is a former power lifter and a physician in Southeast Texas.
