= Ken Ruettgers =

American football player (born 1962)

No. 75
- Position: Offensive tackle

Personal information
- Born: August 20, 1962 (age 64); Bakersfield, California, U.S.
- Listed height: 6 ft 5 in (1.96 m)
- Listed weight: 280 lb (127 kg)

Career information
- High school: Garces Memorial (Bakersfield)
- College: USC
- NFL draft: 1985: 1st round, 7th overall pick

Career history
- Green Bay Packers (1985–1996)

Awards and highlights
- Super Bowl champion (XXXI); Green Bay Packers Hall of Fame; First-team All-Pac-10 (1984)

Career NFL statistics
- Games played: 156
- Games started: 140
- Fumble recoveries: 11
- Stats at Pro Football Reference

Kenneth Francis Ruettgers (born August 20, 1962) is an American former professional football player who was an offensive tackle for the Green Bay Packers of the National Football League (NFL) from 1985 to 1996. He played college football for the USC Trojans. He was inducted into the Green Bay Packers Hall of Fame.

== Early life ==
Ruettgers attended Garces Memorial High School (Bakersfield, California) and was a good student and a standout in football. His two younger brothers, Steven and Paul, graduated from Garces Memorial as well, while his younger sister, Laura Jane Ruettgers, graduated from Highland many years later.

== College career ==
Ruettgers played college football at the University of Southern California, where he was named to the All-Pac-10 Conference Team in 1984. He blocked for Rodney Peete and Heisman Trophy winner Marcus Allen.

== Professional career ==
After graduating from USC, Ruettgers was drafted in the first round of the 1985 NFL draft (seventh pick) by Green Bay, where he remained throughout his professional career. He was the Green Bay Packers' 1989 offensive MVP. He began the 1996 season on the Physically Unable to Perform List. He was activated after four games, but injuries had taken their toll, and he could not finish the season.

In December 2013, Ruettgers was named as an inductee into the Green Bay Packers Hall of Fame. The induction ceremony took place on July 19, 2014, at the Lambeau Field Atrium. He became the 150th member to be inducted into the Green Bay Packer Hall of Fame, along with Ahman Green.

== Post-football ==
After a successful career in the NFL, Ruettgers moved to Oregon. After a brief stint in the publishing industry, he founded GamesOver.org, a nonprofit group dedicated to helping former professional athletes cope with the stresses of retirement.

Ruettgers has a B.A. in business administration from USC's Marshall School of Business and an MBA from California State University, Bakersfield. He received a Ph.D. in sociology from Oxford Graduate School in Dayton, Tennessee, in 2007. Later, he began teaching sociology classes part-time at Central Oregon Community College. Students found out that he had been a football player when they found his Wikipedia entry. He has also begun coaching football at a local high school in Sisters, Oregon.

== Personal life ==
Ruettgers is married with three children. His oldest son, Matthew, died in a motorcycle accident in 2012.
