= 1985 All-Pacific-10 Conference football team =

The 1985 All-Pacific-10 Conference football team consists of American football players chosen by various organizations for All-Pacific 10 Conference teams for the 1985 college football season.

== Offensive selections ==
=== Quarterbacks ===
- Chris Miller, Oregon (Coaches-1)
- John Paye, Stanford (Coaches-2)

=== Running backs ===
- Rueben Mayes, Washington St. (Coaches-1)
- Brad Muster, Stanford (Coaches-1)
- Tony Cherry, Oregon (Coaches-1)
- Marc Hicks, California (Coaches-2)
- Fred Crutcher, USC (Coaches-2)
- Rick Fenney, Washington (Coaches-2)

=== Wide receivers ===
- Lew Barnes, Oregon (Coaches-1)
- Reggie Bynum, Oregon St. (Coaches-1)
- Aaron Cox, Arizona St. (Coaches-2)
- Lonzell Hill, Washington (Coaches-2)
- Jon Horton, Arizona (Coaches-2)

=== Tight ends ===
- Greg Baty, Stanford (Coaches-1)
- Joe Cormier, USC (Coaches-2)

=== Tackles ===
- Jeff Bregel, USC (Coaches-1)
- James FitzPatrick, USC (Coaches-1)
- Greg Schwab, Oregon (Coaches-2)
- David Fonoti, Arizona St. (Coaches-2)

=== Guards ===
- Mike Hartmeier, UCLA (Coaches-1)
- Keith Kartz, California (Coaches-1)
- Mark Stephens, California (Coaches-2)

=== Centers ===
- John Barns, Stanford (Coaches-1)
- Joe Tofflemire, Arizona (Coaches-2)
- Curt Ladines, Washington St. (Coaches-2)

== Defensive selections ==
=== Linemen ===
- Mark Walen, UCLA (Coaches-1)
- Erik Howard, Washington St. (Coaches-1)
- Reggie Rogers, Washington (Coaches-1)
- Terry Tumey, UCLA (Coaches-1)
- Tony Colorito, USC (Coaches-2)
- Majett Whiteside, California (Coaches-2)
- Matt Koart, USC (Coaches-2)
- Dan Saleaumua, Arizona St. (Coaches-2)

=== Linebackers ===
- Byron Evans, Arizona (Coaches-1)
- Hardy Nickerson, California (Coaches-1)
- Tommy Taylor, UCLA (Coaches-1)
- Joe Kelly, Washington (Coaches-1)
- Greg Battle, Arizona St. (Coaches-2)
- Osia Lewis, Oregon St. (Coaches-2)
- Scott Stephen, Arizona St. (Coaches-2)
- Tom Prukop, Stanford (Coaches-2)

=== Defensive backs ===
- Allan Durden, Arizona (Coaches-1)
- Tim McDonald, USC (Coaches-1)
- David Fulcher, Arizona St. (Coaches-1)
- Vestee Jackson, Washington (Coaches-1)
- Lavance Northington, Oregon St. (Coaches-2)
- James Washington, UCLA (Coaches-2)
- Craig Rutledge, UCLA (Coaches-2)
- Chuck Cecil, Arizona (Coaches-2)

== Special teams ==
=== Placekickers ===
- John Lee, UCLA (Coaches-1)
- Max Zendejas, Arizona St. (Coaches-2)

=== Punters ===
- Mike Schuh, Arizona St. (Coaches-1)
- Mike Preacher, Oregon (Coaches-2)

=== Return specialists ===
- Kitrick Taylor, Washington St. (Coaches-1)
- Anthony Parker, Arizona St. (Coaches-2)

== Key ==
Coaches = Pacific-10 head football coaches

== See also ==
- 1985 College Football All-America Team
