= 1984 UCLA Bruins football team =

American college football season

1984 UCLA Bruins football

Fiesta Bowl champion

Fiesta Bowl, W 39–37 vs. Miami (FL)
- Conference: Pacific-10 Conference

Ranking
- Coaches: No. 10
- AP: No. 9
- Record: 9–3 (5–2 Pac-10)
- Head coach: Terry Donahue (9th season)
- Offensive coordinator: Homer Smith (7th season)
- Co-defensive coordinators: Bob Field (3rd season); Tom Hayes (3rd season)
- Home stadium: Rose Bowl

1984 Pacific-10 Conference football standings
	Conf.					Overall
Team	W		L		T	W		L		T
No. 10 USC $	7	–	1	–	0	9	–	3	–	0
No. 2 Washington	6	–	1	–	0	11	–	1	–	0
No. 9 UCLA	5	–	2	–	0	9	–	3	–	0
Arizona	5	–	2	–	0	7	–	4	–	0
Washington State	4	–	3	–	0	6	–	5	–	0
Arizona State	3	–	4	–	0	5	–	6	–	0
Oregon	3	–	5	–	0	6	–	5	–	0
Stanford	3	–	5	–	0	5	–	6	–	0
Oregon State	1	–	7	–	0	2	–	9	–	0
California	1	–	8	–	0	2	–	9	–	0
$ – Conference champion; Rankings from AP Poll

The 1984 UCLA Bruins football team was an American football team that represented the University of California, Los Angeles during the 1984 NCAA Division I-A football season. In their ninth year under head coach Terry Donahue, the Bruins compiled a 9–3 record (5–2 Pac-10), finished in a tie for third place in the Pacific-10 Conference, and were ranked #9 in the final AP Poll. The Bruins went on to defeat Miami in the 1985 Fiesta Bowl. Gaston Green and James Washington were named the offensive and defensive most valuable players in the 1985 Fiesta Bowl.

UCLA's offensive leaders in 1984 were quarterback Steve Bono with 1,333 passing yards, running back Danny Andrews with 605 rushing yards, and wide receiver Mike Sherrard with 635 receiving yards.

== Schedule ==
Date	Opponent	Rank	Site	TV	Result	Attendance	Source
September 8	at San Diego State*	No. 4	Jack Murphy Stadium; San Diego, CA		W 18–15	49,220	
September 15	Long Beach State*	No. 7	Rose Bowl; Pasadena, CA		W 23–17	40,132	
September 22	No. 1 Nebraska*	No. 8	Rose Bowl; Pasadena, CA	CBS	L 3–42	71,355	
September 29	at Colorado*	No. 17	Folsom Field; Boulder, CO		W 33–16	38,925	
October 6	Stanford	No. 17	Rose Bowl; Pasadena, CA (rivalry)	Metro	L 21–23	53,806	
October 13	Washington State		Rose Bowl; Pasadena, CA		W 27–24	40,122	
October 20	at California		California Memorial Stadium; Berkeley, CA (rivalry)	CBS	W 17–14	55,200	
October 27	at Arizona State		Sun Devil Stadium; Tempe, AZ	CBS	W 21–13	67,221	
November 3	Oregon^{†}		Rose Bowl; Pasadena, CA	Metro	L 18–20	44,420	
November 10	Oregon State		Rose Bowl; Pasadena, CA		W 26–17	34,116	
November 17	No. 7 USC		Rose Bowl; Pasadena, CA (Victory Bell)	CBS	W 29–10	90,096	
January 1, 1985	vs. No. 13 Miami (FL)*	No. 14	Sun Devil Stadium; Tempe, AZ (Fiesta Bowl)	NBC	W 39–37	60,310	
*Non-conference game; ^{†}Homecoming; Rankings from AP Poll released prior to the game

== Rankings ==
Ranking movements Legend: ██ Increase in ranking ██ Decrease in ranking — = Not ranked ( ) = First-place votes
	Week															
Poll	Pre	1	2	3	4	5	6	7	8	9	10	11	12	13	14	Final
AP	5 (5)	4 (6)	7 (2)	8 (2)	17	17	—	—	—	—	—	—	19	17	14	9
Coaches	5 (1)	4	7	10	15	—	—	—	—	—	—	—	—	18	15	10

== Game summaries ==
=== Nebraska ===
#1 Nebraska at #8 UCLA

Team	1	2	3	4	Total
• No. 1 Cornhuskers	6	15	7	14	42
No. 8 Bruins	0	0	3	0	3

- Date: September 22
- Location: Rose Bowl, Pasadena, California
- Game attendance: 71,355

=== Colorado ===
Team	1	2	3	4	Total
• No. 17 Bruins	7	6	13	7	33
Buffaloes	0	6	3	7	16

- Date: September 30
- Location: Folsom Field, Boulder, Colorado
- Game attendance: 38,925

Scoring summary
1	UCLA	Gaston Green 4-yard run (John Lee kick)	UCLA 7-0
2	UCLA	John Lee 51-yard field goal	UCLA 10-0
2	COL	Dave DeLine 32-yard field goal	UCLA 10-3
2	UCLA	John Lee 49-yard field goal	UCLA 13-3
2	COL	Dave DeLine 18-yard field goal	UCLA 13-6
3	UCLA	John Lee 39-yard field goal	UCLA 16-6
3	COL	Dave DeLine 43-yard field goal	UCLA 16-9
3	UCLA	Gaston Green 5-yard run (John Lee kick)	UCLA 23-9
3	UCLA	John Lee 36-yard field goal	UCLA 26-9
4	UCLA	Greg Bolin 3-yard pass from Matt Stevens (John Lee kick)	UCLA 33-9
4	COL	Jon Embree 29-yard pass from Steve Vogel (Dave DeLine kick)	UCLA 33-16

=== Vs. Miami (FL) (Fiesta Bowl) ===
UCLA vs. Miami (FL)

Team	1	2	3	4	Total
• No. 14 Bruins	7	15	7	10	39
No. 13 Hurricanes	14	7	3	13	37

- Date: January 1
- Location: Sun Devil Stadium
- Game attendance: 60,310
- TV announcers (NBC): Charlie Jones and Bob Griese

== Roster ==
1984 UCLA Bruins football team roster
Players
Coaches
Offense

Pos.	#	Name	Class
QB	12	Steve Bono	Sr
RB	44	Gaston Green	Fr
QB	11	Matt Stevens	So

Defense

Pos.	#	Name	Class
LB	39	Neal Dellocono	Sr
LB	41	Ken Norton Jr.	Fr
LB	42	Tommy Taylor	Jr
NG	40	Terry Tumey	Fr
DT		Mark Walen	Jr

Special teams

Pos.	#	Name	Class
K		John Lee	Jr

Head coach

- Terry Donahue

Coordinators/assistant coaches

Legend

- (C) Team captain
- (S) Suspended
- (I) Ineligible
- Injured
- Redshirt

== 1985 NFL draft ==
The following players were drafted into professional football following the season.

Player	Position	Round	Pick	Franchise
Steve Bono	Quarterback	6	142	Minnesota Vikings
Michael Young	Wide receiver	6	161	Los Angeles Rams
Ron Pitts	Defensive back	7	169	Buffalo Bills
Duval Love	Guard	10	274	Los Angeles Rams
Neal Dellocono	Linebacker	11	297	Dallas Cowboys
Herb Welch	Defensive back	12	326	New York Giants
