= 1984 Oregon Ducks football team =

American college football season

1984 Oregon Ducks football
- Conference: Pacific-10 Conference
- Record: 6–5 (3–5 Pac-10)
- Head coach: Rich Brooks (8th season)
- Offensive coordinator: Bob Toledo (2nd season)
- Offensive scheme: I formation
- Defensive coordinator: Joe Schaffeld (2nd season)
- Base defense: 4–3
- MVP: Doug Herman
- Captains: Lew Barnes; Bob Hudetz
- Home stadium: Autzen Stadium

1984 Pacific-10 Conference football standings
	Conf.					Overall
Team	W		L		T	W		L		T
No. 10 USC $	7	–	1	–	0	9	–	3	–	0
No. 2 Washington	6	–	1	–	0	11	–	1	–	0
No. 9 UCLA	5	–	2	–	0	9	–	3	–	0
Arizona	5	–	2	–	0	7	–	4	–	0
Washington State	4	–	3	–	0	6	–	5	–	0
Arizona State	3	–	4	–	0	5	–	6	–	0
Oregon	3	–	5	–	0	6	–	5	–	0
Stanford	3	–	5	–	0	5	–	6	–	0
Oregon State	1	–	7	–	0	2	–	9	–	0
California	1	–	8	–	0	2	–	9	–	0
$ – Conference champion; Rankings from AP Poll

The 1984 Oregon Ducks football team represented the University of Oregon in the 1984 NCAA Division I-A football season. Playing as a member of the Pacific-10 Conference (Pac-10), the team was led by head coach Rich Brooks, in his eighth year, and played their home games at Autzen Stadium in Eugene, Oregon. They finished the season with a record of 6–5 overall and 3–5 in the Pac-10.

== Schedule ==
Date	Time	Opponent	Site	TV	Result	Attendance	Source
September 8	1:00 pm	Long Beach State*	Autzen Stadium; Eugene, OR		W 28–17	23,044	
September 15	1:00 pm	Colorado*	Autzen Stadium; Eugene, OR		W 27–20	25,047	
September 22	12:30 pm	at California	California Memorial Stadium; Berkeley, CA		W 21–14	40,500	
September 29	1:00 pm	Pacific (CA)*	Autzen Stadium; Eugene, OR		W 30–14	28,505	
October 6	5:30 pm	at Arizona	Arizona Stadium; Tucson, AZ		L 14–28	40,848	
October 13	3:30 pm	USC^{†}	Autzen Stadium; Eugene, OR (rivalry)	Metro	L 9–19	29,581	
October 20	1:00 pm	at No. 1 Washington	Husky Stadium; Seattle, WA (rivalry)		L 10–17	60,589	
October 27	1:00 pm	Washington State	Autzen Stadium; Eugene, OR		L 41–50	24,874	
November 3	11:30 am	at UCLA	Rose Bowl; Pasadena, CA	Metro	W 20–16	44,420	
November 10	1:00 pm	Arizona State	Autzen Stadium; Eugene, OR		L 10–44	23,262	
November 17	1:00 pm	at Oregon State	Parker Stadium; Corvallis, OR (Civil War)		W 31–6	39,000	
*Non-conference game; ^{†}Homecoming; Rankings from AP Poll released prior to the game; All times are in Pacific time
