= 1984 California Golden Bears football team =

American college football season

1984 California Golden Bears football
- Conference: Pacific-10 Conference
- Record: 2–9 (1–8 Pac-10)
- Head coach: Joe Kapp (3rd season)
- Defensive coordinator: Denny Schuler (2nd season)
- Home stadium: California Memorial Stadium

1984 Pacific-10 Conference football standings
	Conf.					Overall
Team	W		L		T	W		L		T
No. 10 USC $	7	–	1	–	0	9	–	3	–	0
No. 2 Washington	6	–	1	–	0	11	–	1	–	0
No. 9 UCLA	5	–	2	–	0	9	–	3	–	0
Arizona	5	–	2	–	0	7	–	4	–	0
Washington State	4	–	3	–	0	6	–	5	–	0
Arizona State	3	–	4	–	0	5	–	6	–	0
Oregon	3	–	5	–	0	6	–	5	–	0
Stanford	3	–	5	–	0	5	–	6	–	0
Oregon State	1	–	7	–	0	2	–	9	–	0
California	1	–	8	–	0	2	–	9	–	0
$ – Conference champion; Rankings from AP Poll

The 1984 California Golden Bears football team was an American football team that represented the University of California, Berkeley in the Pacific-10 Conference (Pac-10) during the 1984 NCAA Division I-A football season. In their fourth year under head coach Joe Kapp, the Golden Bears compiled a 2–9 record (1–8 against Pac-10 opponents), finished in last place in the Pac-10, and were outscored by their opponents by a combined total of 264 to 150.

The team's statistical leaders included Gale Gilbert with 1,693 passing yards, Ed Barbero with 554 rushing yards, and Rance McDougald with 473 receiving yards.

== Schedule ==
Date	Opponent	Site	Result	Attendance	Source
September 8	at Arizona	Arizona Stadium; Tucson, AZ	L 13–23	41,234	
September 15	Pacific (CA)*	California Memorial Stadium; Berkeley, CA	W 28–12	37,000	
September 22	Oregon	California Memorial Stadium; Berkeley, CA	L 14–21	40,500	
September 29	San Jose State*	California Memorial Stadium; Berkeley, CA	L 18–33	43,200	
October 6	at Arizona State	Sun Devil Stadium; Tempe, AZ	W 19–14	66,374	
October 13	at Oregon State	Parker Stadium; Corvallis, OR	L 6–9	20,000	
October 20	UCLA	California Memorial Stadium; Berkeley, CA (rivalry)	L 14–17	55,400	
October 27	at No. 20 USC	Los Angeles Memorial Coliseum; Los Angeles, CA	L 7–31	52,692	
November 3	at No. 1 Washington	Husky Stadium; Seattle, WA	L 14–44	59,462	
November 10	Washington State	California Memorial Stadium; Berkeley, CA	L 7–33	30,135	
November 17	Stanford	California Memorial Stadium; Berkeley, CA (Big Game)	L 10–27	75,662	
*Non-conference game; Rankings from AP Poll released prior to the game

== Roster ==
1984 California Golden Bears football team roster
Players
Coaches
Offense

Pos.	#	Name	Class
FB	40	Ed Barbero	Jr
WR	21	Keith Cockett	Jr
WR	13	Vince Delgado	Fr
QB	14	Gale Gilbert	Sr
OT	78	Keith Kartz	Jr
TE	81	Yancy Lindsey	Sr
G	79	Mark Long	Sr
C	52	Mike Reed	Sr
OT	64	Mark Stephens	Jr
G	71	Ron Zenker	Jr

Defense

Pos.	#	Name	Class
DB	27	David Carter	Sr
DB	20	Matt Grimes	Jr
LB	95	Marshall Hennington	So
LB	92	Pat McDonald	So
LB	47	Hardy Nickerson	So
DB	1	Ray Noble	Sr
DB	2	Ken Pettway	Jr
DT	73	Doug Riesenberg	So
DT	65	Mike Rusinek	Sr
DB	32	Garey Williams	Jr

Special teams

Pos.	#	Name	Class

Head coach

- Joe Kapp

Coordinators/assistant coaches

- Mike Rasmussen
  (Quarterbacks coach & wide receivers coach)

Legend

- (C) Team captain
- (S) Suspended
- (I) Ineligible
- Injured
- Redshirt
