= 1984 Arizona Wildcats football team =

American college football season

1984 Arizona Wildcats football
- Conference: Pacific-10 Conference
- Record: 7–4 (5–2 Pac-10)
- Head coach: Larry Smith (5th season)
- Offensive coordinator: Steve Axman (5th season)
- Defensive coordinator: Moe Ankney (5th season)
- Home stadium: Arizona Stadium

1984 Pacific-10 Conference football standings
	Conf.					Overall
Team	W		L		T	W		L		T
No. 10 USC $	7	–	1	–	0	9	–	3	–	0
No. 2 Washington	6	–	1	–	0	11	–	1	–	0
No. 9 UCLA	5	–	2	–	0	9	–	3	–	0
Arizona	5	–	2	–	0	7	–	4	–	0
Washington State	4	–	3	–	0	6	–	5	–	0
Arizona State	3	–	4	–	0	5	–	6	–	0
Oregon	3	–	5	–	0	6	–	5	–	0
Stanford	3	–	5	–	0	5	–	6	–	0
Oregon State	1	–	7	–	0	2	–	9	–	0
California	1	–	8	–	0	2	–	9	–	0
$ – Conference champion; Rankings from AP Poll

The 1984 Arizona Wildcats football team represented the University of Arizona in the Pacific 10 Conference (Pac-10) during the 1984 NCAA Division I-A football season. In their fifth season under head coach Larry Smith, the Wildcats compiled a 7–4 record (5–2 against Pac-10 opponents), finished in a tie for third place in the Pac-10, and outscored their opponents, 272 to 192. The team played their home games at Arizona Stadium in Tucson, Arizona.

The Wildcats were placed on probation by both the NCAA and Pac-10 in May 1983 following the discovery of cash payments to student-athletes and players as well as allegations of fraud involving former Arizona coach Tony Mason in a scandal that rocked the university. Due to the NCAA violations, Arizona was ineligible for the 1984 Pac-10 championship and was banned from playing in a bowl game (including the Rose Bowl). They were also barred from playing games on live television during the season as well as 1985.

== Before the season ==
The Wildcats completed the 1983 season with a record of 7–3–1 (4–3–1 in Pac-10). They did not participate in a bowl game due to the NCAA sanctions for recruiting violations. Arizona was deeply affected by the penalties when it came to recruiting during the offseason.

Arizona entered the 1984 season believing that they would win despite being on probation, though they would neither be competing for the Rose Bowl nor being shown on television. The NCAA had announced in May 1983 that the Wildcats would be barred from both a bowl game and having games aired live on TV. As a result of the TV ban, Arizona games were not aired on national or cable networks.

== Schedule ==
Date	Time	Opponent	Site	Result	Attendance	Source
September 1	7:00 p.m.	Fresno State*	Arizona Stadium; Tucson, AZ	L 22–27	43,477	
September 8	7:00 p.m.	California	Arizona Stadium; Tucson, AZ	W 23–13	41,234	
September 15	7:30 p.m.	at Oregon State	Multnomah Stadium; Portland, OR	W 27–8	18,000	
September 22	5:30 p.m.	at LSU*	Tiger Stadium; Baton Rouge, LA	L 26–27	78,052	
September 29	7:00 p.m.	Long Beach State*	Arizona Stadium; Tucson, AZ	W 31–24	41,910	
October 6	7:00 p.m.	Oregon	Arizona Stadium; Tucson, AZ	W 28–14	40,848	
October 20	1:30 p.m.	at USC	Los Angeles Memorial Coliseum; Los Angeles, CA	L 14–17	65,411	
October 27	1:00 p.m.	at No. 1 Washington	Husky Stadium; Seattle, WA	L 12–28	59,876	
November 3	7:30 p.m.	Utah State*	Arizona Stadium; Tucson, AZ	W 45–10	44,225	
November 10	1:30 p.m.	Stanford^{†}	Arizona Stadium; Tucson, AZ	W 28–14	44,836	
November 24	7:30 p.m.	Arizona State	Arizona Stadium; Tucson, AZ (rivalry)	W 16–10	58,132	
*Non-conference game; ^{†}Homecoming; Rankings from AP Poll released prior to the game; All times are in Mountain time

== Game summaries ==
=== LSU ===
Arizona traveled to Baton Rouge to play Louisiana State (LSU) in the first meeting between the two schools. The Wildcats fought tough and ultimately came up short against the Tigers.

=== Oregon ===
Team	1	2	3	4	Total
Oregon	7	0	0	7	14
• Arizona	0	10	11	7	28

- Date: October 6
- Location: Arizona Stadium
- Game attendance: 40,848

Scoring summary
Q1	ORE	Barnes 80 yard pass from Miller (MacLeod kick)	ORE 7–0
Q2	ARIZ	Zendejas 23 yard field goal	ORE 7–3
Q2	ARIZ	Jenkins 6 yard run (Zendejas kick)	ARIZ 10–7
Q3	ARIZ	Zendejas 30 yard field goal	ARIZ 13–7
Q3	ARIZ	Prior 6 yard run (Prior run)	ARIZ 21–7
Q4	ORE	Miller 11 yard pass from McCall (MacLeod kick)	ARIZ 21–14
Q4	ARIZ	Adams 10 yard run (Zendejas kick)	ARIZ 28–14

Against Oregon at home, Arizona played a close game in the first half before taking control in the second to pull away from the Ducks to earn the win.

=== Washington ===
On the road at Washington, Arizona's offense struggled at times against the top-ranked Huskies’ defense, which led to a Wildcats loss. Arizona committed several turnovers, which ultimately cost them the game.

=== Arizona State ===
The Wildcats played their season finale against rival Arizona State. In front of an Arizona Stadium crowd, the Wildcats did enough against the Sun Devils in low-scoring contest, and Arizona came out victorious over ASU for the third year in a row. The offense managed to get only one touchdown and kicker Max Zendejas, who defeated ASU the previous year with a field goal, made three kicks, including 51 and 32 yard attempts in the fourth quarter, during the win. In addition, Arizona’s defense intercepted ASU several times, which led to the victory. It was the first time since 1960-62 that the Wildcats defeated their rivals in three consecutive seasons. Arizona finished the season with seven wins, matching their 1983 total.

== Season notes ==
- Arizona's seven victories were enough to be bowl-eligible, but due to NCAA sanctions, they were not eligible for the postseason.
- The Wildcats lost their home opener against Fresno State and would prevent a perfect home record as they would win their remaining home games.
- The road game at Oregon State was played in the evening, which was the first time since 1981 that Arizona played a night game on the road. It turned out to be the Wildcats’ only road win of the season.
- The loss to LSU would be the closest that the Wildcats would ever come to defeating the Tigers, as they lost big in future meetings in 2003 and 2006.
- Arizona played only one game against a ranked team, which was a loss to Washington (ranked first) in late October.
- After starting out the season with a 4–4 record, the Wildcats won their final three games to finish with a winning record.
- For the third season in a row, the team treated their finale against Arizona State as their bowl game, and ultimately won it, as they were under a bowl ban. In addition, a Tucson newspaper labeled Arizona’s victory as “terminating” (defeating) ASU, due to it being a reference to the film The Terminator, which was released during the year.
- All of Arizona's home games this season (as well as 1985) were televised on a local Tucson station (then-independent affiliate KZAZ, which would become KMSB in 1985, and is now a Fox affiliate) and were all aired on a tape delay and broadcast the day after due to the games not airing live as a result of the team's TV ban. Three of the Wildcats’ four road games (LSU, USC, and Washington) actually aired on TV, which were broadcast only in the local markets of the opposing teams (Baton Rouge, Los Angeles, and Seattle, respectively), as the ban was limited to the Tucson market. As a result of their games not being aired live on television, fans had to either attend the games or listen to them on the radio.

== After the season ==
The Wildcats would improve on their 1984 record and had their bowl ban lifted in 1985, though their live TV ban would continue to be in effect until the end of the 1985 regular season. Arizona would continue to have success and they would eventually appear in bowl game in the 1985 season.

== Personnel ==
1984 Arizona Wildcats football team roster
Players			Coaches
Offense: Pos. / # / Name / Class	Defense: Pos. / # / Name / Class	Special teams: Pos. / # / Name / Class; K / / Max Zendejas / Jr	Head coach: Larry Smith; Coordinators/assistant coaches: Tom Roggeman; Terry Malone GA; Legend: (C) Team captain; (S) Suspended; (I) Ineligible; Injured; Redshirt
