= 1984 Washington State Cougars football team =

American college football season

1984 Washington State Cougars football
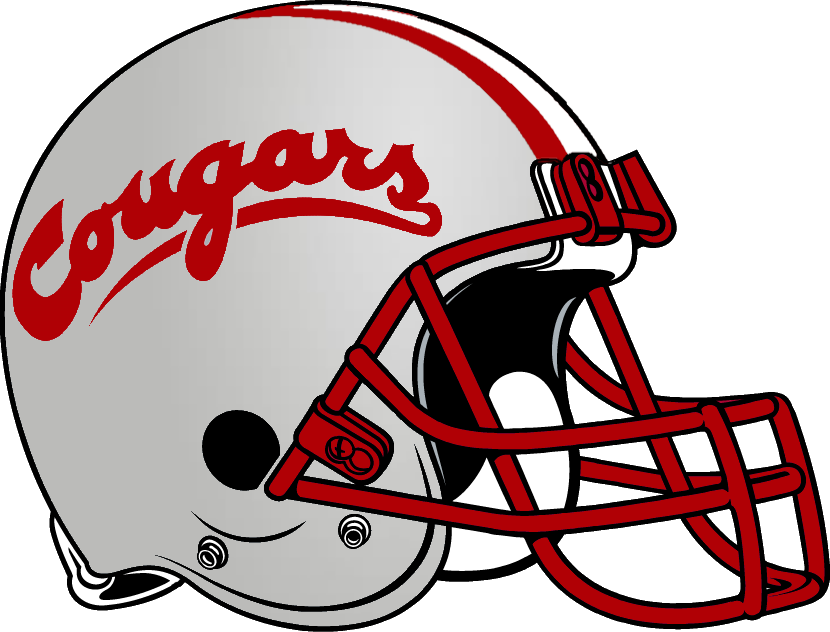
- Conference: Pacific-10 Conference
- Record: 6–5 (4–3 Pac-10)
- Head coach: Jim Walden (7th season)
- Home stadium: Martin Stadium

1984 Pacific-10 Conference football standings
	Conf.					Overall
Team	W		L		T	W		L		T
No. 10 USC $	7	–	1	–	0	9	–	3	–	0
No. 2 Washington	6	–	1	–	0	11	–	1	–	0
No. 9 UCLA	5	–	2	–	0	9	–	3	–	0
Arizona	5	–	2	–	0	7	–	4	–	0
Washington State	4	–	3	–	0	6	–	5	–	0
Arizona State	3	–	4	–	0	5	–	6	–	0
Oregon	3	–	5	–	0	6	–	5	–	0
Stanford	3	–	5	–	0	5	–	6	–	0
Oregon State	1	–	7	–	0	2	–	9	–	0
California	1	–	8	–	0	2	–	9	–	0
$ – Conference champion; Rankings from AP Poll

The 1984 Washington State Cougars football team was an American football team that represented Washington State University in the Pacific-10 Conference (Pac-10) during the 1984 NCAA Division I-A football season. In their seventh season under head coach Jim Walden, the Cougars compiled a 6–5 record (4–3 in Pac-10, fifth), and were outscored 319 to 317.

The team's statistical leaders included Mark Rypien with 1,927 passing yards, Rueben Mayes with 1,637 rushing yards, and John Marshall with 534 receiving yards. In late October, Mayes rushed for 357 yards at Oregon to set an NCAA record.

With a change in the academic calendar, classes now started at WSU a month earlier, in late August. All home games were played on campus at Martin Stadium, with none at Joe Albi Stadium in Spokane.

== Schedule ==
Date	Opponent	Site	Result	Attendance	Source
September 1	at Tennessee*	Neyland Stadium; Knoxville, TN	L 27–34	93,727	
September 8	Utah*	Martin Stadium; Pullman, WA	W 42–40	21,000	
September 15	at No. 9 Ohio State*	Ohio Stadium; Columbus, OH	L 0–44	89,297	
September 22	Ball State*	Martin Stadium; Pullman, WA	W 16–14	16,000	
October 6	USC^{†}	Martin Stadium; Pullman, WA	L 27–29	33,000	
October 13	at UCLA	Rose Bowl; Pasadena, CA	L 24–27	40,122	
October 20	at Stanford	Stanford Stadium; Stanford, CA	W 49–42	33,000	
October 27	at Oregon	Autzen Stadium; Eugene, OR	W 50–41	24,874	
November 3	Oregon State	Martin Stadium; Pullman, WA	W 20–3	26,000	
November 10	at California	California Memorial Stadium; Berkeley, CA	W 33–7	20,250	
November 17	No. 8 Washington	Martin Stadium; Pullman, WA (Apple Cup)	L 29–38	40,000	
*Non-conference game; ^{†}Homecoming; Rankings from AP Poll released prior to the game

== Game summaries ==
=== Oregon ===
Team	1	2	3	4	Total
• Washington St	21	9	7	13	50
Oregon	6	14	6	15	41

- Date:
  October 27
- Location:
  Autzen Stadium,
  Eugene, OR
- Game start: 1:00 pm
- Game attendance: 24,874

Scoring summary
1	9:24	WSU	Rypien 1-yard run (Trout kick)	WSU 7-0
1	6:39	WSU	Chase 77-yard run (Trout kick)	WSU 14-0
1	4:29	ORE	McCall 16-yard run (pass failed)	WSU 14-6
1	0:17	WSU	Mayes 2-yard run (Trout kick)	WSU 21-6
2	9:34	ORE	Barnes 36-yard pass from Holman (pass failed)	WSU 21-12
2	8:20	WSU	Mayes 69-yard run (kick failed)	WSU 27-12
2	5:47	ORE	Barnes 9-yard pass from Miller (Miller to McCall pass)	WSU 27-20
2	0:15	WSU	Trout 26-yard field goal	WSU 30-20
3	9:37	ORE	MacLeod 30-yard field goal	WSU 30-23
3	4:02	ORE	MacLeod 44-yard field goal	WSU 30-26
3	1:51	WSU	Calvin 8-yard run (Trout kick)	WSU 37-26
4	13:49	WSU	Mayes 12-yard run (Trout kick)	WSU 44-26
4	10:42	ORE	Cherry 3-yard run (Miller to McCall pass)	WSU 44-34
4	8:05	WSU	Trout 41-yard field goal	WSU 47-34
4	5:24	ORE	Cherry 1-yard run (MacLeod kick)	WSU 47-41
4	0:56	WSU	Trout 39-yard field goal	WSU 50-41

Statistics

- Rueben Mayes 39 att, 357 yards

== Roster ==
1984 Washington State Cougars football team roster
Players
Coaches
Offense

Pos.	#	Name	Class
QB	10	Ed Blount	So
SE	82	Sam Burris	Sr
RB	22	Richard Calvin	So
SE	24	Rick Chase	So
OT	77	Mike Dreyer	Sr
SE	88	Michael James	So
C	61	Curt Ladines	Jr
TE	92	Vince Leighton	Sr
G	58	Dan Lynch	Sr
SE	18	John Marshall	Sr
RB	36	Rueben Mayes	Jr
TE	89	Jamie Olesen	Sr
FB	30	Kerry Porter (injured)	Jr
QB	17	Mark Rypien	Jr
G	69	Kirk Samuelson	Sr
OT	74	Jamie White	Sr

Defense

Pos.	#	Name	Class
LB	96	Lee Blakeney	Sr
CB	16	Cedric Brown	Jr
CB	44	Erwin Chappel	So
DT	67	Rob Cleveland	So
SS	26	Jeff Dullum	Sr
LB	94	Brad Harrington	Jr
DT	79	Milford Hodge	Sr
DT	73	Erik Howard	Jr
LB	51	James Krakoski	So
LB	49	Jeff Loomis	So
LB	98	Rico Tipton	Sr
FS	2	Jerald Waters	Sr
NG	57	Brent White	Sr

Special teams

Pos.	#	Name	Class
P	1	Glenn Harper	Jr
K	4	John Traut	Jr

Head coach

- Jim Walden (7th year)

Coordinators/assistant coaches

Legend

- (C) Team captain
- (S) Suspended
- (I) Ineligible
- Injured
- Redshirt

== NFL draft ==
Two Cougars were selected in the 1985 NFL draft.

Player	Position	Round	Overall	Franchise
Milford Hodge	DT	8	224	New England Patriots
Dan Lynch	G	12	334	Denver Broncos
