= 1984 Stanford Cardinal football team =

American college football season

1984 Stanford Cardinal football
- Conference: Pacific-10 Conference
- Record: 5–6 (3–5 Pac-10)
- Head coach: Jack Elway (1st season)
- Offensive scheme: West Coast
- Defensive coordinator: Dick Mannini (1st season)
- Base defense: 4–3
- Home stadium: Stanford Stadium

1984 Pacific-10 Conference football standings
	Conf.					Overall
Team	W		L		T	W		L		T
No. 10 USC $	7	–	1	–	0	9	–	3	–	0
No. 2 Washington	6	–	1	–	0	11	–	1	–	0
No. 9 UCLA	5	–	2	–	0	9	–	3	–	0
Arizona	5	–	2	–	0	7	–	4	–	0
Washington State	4	–	3	–	0	6	–	5	–	0
Arizona State	3	–	4	–	0	5	–	6	–	0
Oregon	3	–	5	–	0	6	–	5	–	0
Stanford	3	–	5	–	0	5	–	6	–	0
Oregon State	1	–	7	–	0	2	–	9	–	0
California	1	–	8	–	0	2	–	9	–	0
$ – Conference champion; Rankings from AP Poll

The 1984 Stanford Cardinal football team represented Stanford University in the Pacific-10 Conference (Pac-10) during the 1984 NCAA Division I-A football season. In their first season under head coach Jack Elway, the Cardinal compiled a 5–6 record (3–5 in Pac-10, tied for seventh), and played home games on campus at Stanford Stadium in Stanford, California.

Elway was hired the previous December from nearby San Jose State, where he went 35–20–1 (.634) in five seasons. His Spartans had defeated Stanford the previous three years, the first two while his son John Elway was the Cardinal quarterback. Now on the other side, Coach Elway won the South Bay matchup again this season, as Stanford rallied to win by a point to snap the streak.

== Schedule ==
Date	Time	Opponent	Site	TV	Result	Attendance	Source
September 8	11:30 a.m.	at No. 16 Oklahoma*	Oklahoma Memorial Stadium; Norman, OK	USA	L 7–19	75,008	
September 15	12:30 p.m.	Illinois*	Stanford Stadium; Stanford, CA	Metro Sports	W 34–19	43,795	
September 22	1:00 p.m.	San Jose State*	Stanford Stadium; Stanford, CA (rivalry)		W 28–27	70,426	
September 29	12:30 p.m.	Arizona State	Stanford Stadium; Stanford, CA	Metro Sports	L 10–28	39,500	
October 6	3:15 p.m.	at No. 17 UCLA	Rose Bowl; Pasadena, CA (rivalry)	Metro Sports	W 23–21	53,806	
October 13	12:30 p.m.	No. 2 Washington	Stanford Stadium; Stanford, CA	CBS	L 15–37	44,500	
October 20	1:00 p.m.	Washington State	Stanford Stadium; Stanford, CA		L 42–49	33,000	
October 27	1:00 p.m.	at Oregon State	Parker Stadium; Corvallis, OR		W 28–21	18,000	
November 3	3:00 p.m.	No. 18 USC	Stanford Stadium; Stanford, CA (rivalry)	CBS	L 11–20	74,432	
November 10	4:30 p.m.	at Arizona	Arizona Stadium; Tucson, AZ		L 14–28	44,836	
November 17	1:00 p.m.	at California	California Memorial Stadium; Berkeley, CA (Big Game)		W 27–10	75,622	
*Non-conference game; Rankings from AP Poll released prior to the game; All times are in Pacific time

== Game summaries ==
=== San Jose State ===
Stanford snapped a three-game losing streak to the Spartans, rallying to win by a point.

=== At UCLA ===
The 23–21 upset on October 6 at the Rose Bowl was head coach Jack Elway's first Pac-10 victory. Making his first-ever collegiate start, backup quarterback Fred Buckley led the Cardinal over the #17 UCLA Bruins, and the redshirt junior was named Pac-10 Offensive Player of the Week.

== Coaching staff ==
- Jack Elway – Head coach
- Jimmy Walsh – Running back
- Dave Baldwin – Tight end
- Tony Yelovich – Offensive line
- Dick Mannini – Defensive Coordinator & secondary
- Tony Samuel – Defensive line
- Larry Kerr – Inside linebacker & special teams coordinator
- Greg McMackin – Outside linebacker
