= Timmie Ware =

American football player (born 1963)

No. 81, 80
- Position: Wide receiver

Personal information
- Born: April 2, 1963 (age 63); Los Angeles, California, U.S.
- Listed height: 5 ft 10 in (1.78 m)
- Listed weight: 171 lb (78 kg)

Career information
- High school: Centennial (Compton, California)
- College: USC
- NFL draft: 1985: undrafted

Career history
- San Diego Chargers (1985–1987); Los Angeles Raiders (1989); Kansas City Chiefs (1990)*
- * Offseason or practice squad member only

Career NFL statistics
- Receptions: 3
- Receiving yards: 49
- Return yards: 86
- Stats at Pro Football Reference

Timothy Eugene Ware (born April 2, 1963) is an American former professional football player who was a wide receiver in the National Football League (NFL) for the San Diego Chargers and Los Angeles Raiders. He played college football for the USC Trojans.
