= 1984 Arizona State Sun Devils football team =

American college football season

1984 Arizona State Sun Devils football
- Conference: Pacific-10 Conference
- Record: 5–6 (3–4 Pac-10)
- Head coach: Darryl Rogers (5th season)
- Defensive coordinator: Al Luginbill (3rd season)
- Home stadium: Sun Devil Stadium

1984 Pacific-10 Conference football standings
	Conf.					Overall
Team	W		L		T	W		L		T
No. 10 USC $	7	–	1	–	0	9	–	3	–	0
No. 2 Washington	6	–	1	–	0	11	–	1	–	0
No. 9 UCLA	5	–	2	–	0	9	–	3	–	0
Arizona	5	–	2	–	0	7	–	4	–	0
Washington State	4	–	3	–	0	6	–	5	–	0
Arizona State	3	–	4	–	0	5	–	6	–	0
Oregon	3	–	5	–	0	6	–	5	–	0
Stanford	3	–	5	–	0	5	–	6	–	0
Oregon State	1	–	7	–	0	2	–	9	–	0
California	1	–	8	–	0	2	–	9	–	0
$ – Conference champion; Rankings from AP Poll

The 1984 Arizona State Sun Devils football team represented Arizona State University as a member of the Pacific-10 Conference (Pac-10) during the 1984 NCAA Division I-A football season. Led by Darryl Rogers in his fifth and final season as head coach, the Sun Devils compiled an overall record of 5–6 with mark of 3–4 in conference play, placing sixth in the Pac-10. Arizona State played home games at Sun Devil Stadium in Tempe, Arizona.

== Schedule ==
Date	Time	Opponent	Rank	Site	TV	Result	Attendance	Source
September 8	7:30 pm	Oklahoma State*	No. 12	Sun Devil Stadium; Tempe, AZ		L 3–45	70,234	
September 15	7:30 pm	San Jose State*		Sun Devil Stadium; Tempe, AZ		W 48–0	63,271	
September 22	7:30 pm	No. 17 USC		Sun Devil Stadium; Tempe, AZ		L 3–6	70,219	
September 29	12:30 pm	at Stanford		Stanford Stadium; Stanford, CA	KPNX	W 28–10	39,500	
October 6	7:30 pm	California		Sun Devil Stadium; Tempe, AZ		L 14–19	66,378	
October 20	4:00 pm	Oregon State		Sun Devil Stadium; Tempe, AZ	KPNX	W 45–10	64,614	
October 27	3:00 pm	UCLA		Sun Devil Stadium; Tempe, AZ	CBS	L 13–21	67,221	
November 3	7:00 pm	No. 14 Florida State*		Sun Devil Stadium; Tempe, AZ		L 44–52	68,574	
November 10	2:00 pm	at Oregon		Autzen Stadium; Eugene, OR		W 44–10	23,262	
November 17	7:30 pm	Colorado State*		Sun Devil Stadium; Tempe, AZ		W 45–14	67,143	
November 24	7:30 pm	at Arizona		Arizona Stadium; Tucson, AZ (rivalry)		L 10–16	58,132	
*Non-conference game; Rankings from AP Poll released prior to the game; All times are in Mountain time

== Personnel ==
1984 Arizona State Sun Devils football team roster
Players
Coaches
Offense

Pos.	#	Name	Class
QB		Tim Salem	Sr
OL		Jim Warne	So

Defense

Pos.	#	Name	Class

Special teams

Pos.	#	Name	Class
K		Luis Zendejas	Sr

Head coach

- Darryl Rogers

Coordinators/assistant coaches

- Al Luginbill – Defensive coordinator

Legend

- (C) Team captain
- (S) Suspended
- (I) Ineligible
- Injured
- Redshirt
