= 1984 Oregon State Beavers football team =

American college football season

1984 Oregon State Beavers football
- Conference: Pacific-10 Conference
- Record: 2–9 (1–7 Pac-10)
- Head coach: Joe Avezzano (5th season)
- Offensive coordinator: Booker Brooks (1st season)
- Offensive scheme: Pro-style
- Defensive coordinator: Tim Hundley (1st season)
- Base defense: 4–3
- Home stadium: Parker Stadium; Civic Stadium

1984 Pacific-10 Conference football standings
	Conf.					Overall
Team	W		L		T	W		L		T
No. 10 USC $	7	–	1	–	0	9	–	3	–	0
No. 2 Washington	6	–	1	–	0	11	–	1	–	0
No. 9 UCLA	5	–	2	–	0	9	–	3	–	0
Arizona	5	–	2	–	0	7	–	4	–	0
Washington State	4	–	3	–	0	6	–	5	–	0
Arizona State	3	–	4	–	0	5	–	6	–	0
Oregon	3	–	5	–	0	6	–	5	–	0
Stanford	3	–	5	–	0	5	–	6	–	0
Oregon State	1	–	7	–	0	2	–	9	–	0
California	1	–	8	–	0	2	–	9	–	0
$ – Conference champion; Rankings from AP Poll

The 1984 Oregon State Beavers football team represented Oregon State University as a member of the Pacific-10 Conference (Pac-10) during the 1984 NCAA Division I-A football season. Led by Joe Avezzano in his fifth and final season as head coach, the Beavers compiled an overall record of 2–9 with a mark of 1–7 in conference play, placing ninth in the Pac-10. Oregon State played five home games on campus at Parker Stadium in Corvallis, and one at Civic Stadium in Portland.

Avezzano was fired after the season. In his five years as head coach, he posted a record of 6–47–2 (.127).

== Schedule ==
Date	Opponent	Site	Result	Attendance	Source
September 8	at No. 6 Ohio State*	Ohio Stadium; Columbus, OH	L 14–22	88,072	
September 15	Arizona	Civic Stadium; Portland, OR	L 8–27	18,000	
September 22	Wyoming*	Parker Stadium; Corvallis, OR	W 41–14	25,000	
September 29	at Idaho*	Kibbie Dome; Moscow, ID	L 22–41	10,700	
October 6	No. 3 Washington	Parker Stadium; Corvallis, OR	L 7–19	40,000	
October 13	California	Parker Stadium; Corvallis, OR	W 9–6	20,000	
October 20	at Arizona State	Sun Devil Stadium; Tempe, AZ	L 10–45	64,614	
October 27	Stanford	Parker Stadium; Corvallis, OR	L 21–28	18,000	
November 3	at Washington State	Martin Stadium; Pullman, WA	L 3–20	26,000	
November 10	at UCLA	Rose Bowl; Pasadena, CA	L 17–26	34,116	
November 17	Oregon	Parker Stadium; Corvallis, OR (Civil War)	L 6–31	39,000	
*Non-conference game; Rankings from AP Poll released prior to the game

== Roster ==
- QB Ricky Greene
