= 1984 Washington Huskies football team =

American college football season

1984 Washington Huskies football

National champion (Berryman, FB News, NCF) Orange Bowl champion

Orange Bowl, W 28–17 vs. Oklahoma
- Conference: Pacific-10 Conference

Ranking
- Coaches: No. 2
- AP: No. 2
- Record: 11–1 (6–1 Pac-10)
- Head coach: Don James (10th season)
- Offensive coordinator: Gary Pinkel (1st season)
- Defensive coordinator: Jim Lambright (7th season)
- MVP: Ron Holmes
- Captains: Dan Eernissee; Danny Greene; Tim Meamber; Jim Rodgers
- Home stadium: Husky Stadium

1984 Pacific-10 Conference football standings
	Conf.					Overall
Team	W		L		T	W		L		T
No. 10 USC $	7	–	1	–	0	9	–	3	–	0
No. 2 Washington	6	–	1	–	0	11	–	1	–	0
No. 9 UCLA	5	–	2	–	0	9	–	3	–	0
Arizona	5	–	2	–	0	7	–	4	–	0
Washington State	4	–	3	–	0	6	–	5	–	0
Arizona State	3	–	4	–	0	5	–	6	–	0
Oregon	3	–	5	–	0	6	–	5	–	0
Stanford	3	–	5	–	0	5	–	6	–	0
Oregon State	1	–	7	–	0	2	–	9	–	0
California	1	–	8	–	0	2	–	9	–	0
$ – Conference champion; Rankings from AP Poll

The 1984 Washington Huskies football team was an American football team that represented the University of Washington during the 1984 NCAA Division I-A football season. In its tenth season under head coach Don James, the team compiled an 11–1 record, was ranked a close second in the two major polls, and outscored its opponents 352 to 145.

Washington upset Michigan in Ann Arbor in September, and had climbed up to the top ranking, but fell to #14 USC in Los Angeles on November 10. The Huskies rebounded the next week to win the Apple Cup over Washington State in Pullman and finished the regular season at 10–1.

Washington defeated second-ranked Oklahoma 28–17 in the Orange Bowl. NCAA-designated major selectors Berryman (QPRS), Football News, and National Championship Foundation (NCF), each selected Washington as their national champion, with NCF splitting its selection with the BYU Cougars. However, the final AP and Coaches polls both declared the BYU Cougars as national champions.

Ron Holmes was selected as the team's most valuable player. Jim Rodgers was selected for the Guy Flaherty Most Inspirational award. Dan Eernissee, Danny Greene, Tim Meamber, and Rodgers were the team captains.

== Schedule ==
Date	Opponent	Rank	Site	TV	Result	Attendance	Source
September 8	Northwestern*	No. 19	Husky Stadium; Seattle, WA	Metrosports	W 26–0	55,364	
September 15	at No. 3 Michigan*	No. 16	Michigan Stadium; Ann Arbor, MI	CBS	W 20–11	103,072	
September 22	Houston*	No. 9	Husky Stadium; Seattle, WA		W 35–7	61,045	
September 29	Miami (OH)*	No. 6	Husky Stadium; Seattle, WA		W 53–7	56,900	
October 6	at Oregon State	No. 3	Parker Stadium; Corvallis, OR		W 19–7	40,000	
October 13	at Stanford	No. 2	Stanford Stadium; Stanford, CA	CBS	W 37–15	44,500	
October 20	Oregon	No. 1	Husky Stadium; Seattle, WA (rivalry)		W 17–10	58,088	
October 27	Arizona	No. 1	Husky Stadium; Seattle, WA		W 28–12	59,876	
November 3	California	No. 1	Husky Stadium; Seattle, WA		W 44–14	59,462	
November 10	at No. 14 USC	No. 1	Los Angeles Memorial Coliseum; Los Angeles, CA	CBS	L 7–16	71,838	
November 17	at Washington State	No. 8	Martin Stadium; Pullman, WA (Apple Cup)	Metrosports	W 38–29	40,000	
January 1, 1985	vs. No. 2 Oklahoma*	No. 4	Miami Orange Bowl; Miami, FL (Orange Bowl)	NBC	W 28–17	56,294	
*Non-conference game; Rankings from AP Poll Poll released prior to the game

== Rankings ==
Ranking movements Legend: ██ Increase in ranking ██ Decrease in ranking ( ) = First-place votes
	Week															
Poll	Pre	1	2	3	4	5	6	7	8	9	10	11	12	13	14	Final
AP	18	19	16	9	6	3 (1)	2 (1)	1 (37)	1 (45)	1 (50)	1 (50)	8	5 (1)	4 (1)	4 (1)	2 (16)
Coaches	17	18	16	8	5	4 (3)	3 (3)	1 (24)	1 (30)	1 (24)	1 (30)	5	5 (1)	3 (1)	3 (1)	2 (11)

== Game summaries ==
=== At Michigan ===
Team	1	2	3	4	Total
• No. 16 Huskies	3	7	10	0	20
No. 3 Wolverines	0	3	0	8	11

- Date: September 15
- Location: Michigan Stadium
- Game attendance: 103,072

Scoring summary
1	WASH	Jaeger 24-yard field goal	WASH 3–0
2	MICH	Bergeron 52-yard field goal	Tied 3–3
2	WASH	Fenney 2-yard run (Jaeger kick)	WASH 10–3
3	WASH	Pattison 73-yard pass from Millen (Jaeger kick)	WASH 17–3
3	WASH	Jaeger 38-yard field goal	WASH 20–3
4	MICH	Bean 6-yard pass from Harbaugh (Garrett run)	WASH 20–11

=== Oregon ===
Team	1	2	3	4	Total
Ducks	0	7	0	3	10
• No. 1 Huskies	7	0	7	3	17

- Date: October 20
- Location: Husky Stadium
- Game attendance: 58,088

Scoring summary
1	1:53	WASH	Ron Milus 42-yard punt return (Jeff Jaeger kick)	WASH 7–0
2	4:49	Oregon	Alex Mack 1-yard run (McCloud kick)	Tied 7–7
3	6:36	WASH	Jeff Jaeger 32-yard field goal	WASH 10–7
3	4:05	WASH	Mike Gaffney blocked punt recovery in end zone (Jaeger kick)	WASH 17–7
4	10:19	Oregon	McCloud 27-yard field goal	WASH 17–10

=== At USC ===
Washington at USC

Team	1	2	3	4	Total
No. 1 Huskies	0	7	0	0	7
• No. 14 Trojans	3	3	0	10	16

- Date: November 10
- Location: Los Angeles Memorial Coliseum, Los Angeles, California
- Game attendance: 71,838
- Television network: CBS

=== Vs. Oklahoma (Orange Bowl) ===
Washington vs. Oklahoma

Team	1	2	3	4	Total
• No. 4 Huskies	14	0	0	14	28
No. 2 Sooners	0	14	0	3	17

- Date: January 1
- Location: Orange Bowl
- Game attendance: 56,294
- TV announcers (NBC): Don Criqui, Bob Trumpy, and Bill Macatee

== Roster ==
1984 Washington Huskies football team roster
Players
Coaches
Offense

Pos.	#	Name	Class
G	78	Tim Burnham	Jr
QB	17	Chris Chandler	Fr
C	51	Dan Eernissee (C)	Sr
FB	30	Rick Fenney	So
G	72	Kevin Gogan	Sr
WR	80	Danny Greene (C)	Sr
WR	1	Lonzell Hill	So
FB	45	Walt Hunt	Sr
TE	84	Rod Jones	So
TE	82	Scott Jones	Fr
OT	75	Dennis Maher	Sr
QB	12	Hugh Millen	Jr
WR	19	Mark Pattison	Sr
G	67	Al Robertson	Sr
RB	28	Jacque Robinson	Sr
QB	14	Paul Sicuro	Sr
OT	68	Garth Thomas	So
TE	88	Tony Wroten	Sr
OT	50	Mike Zandofsky	Fr

Defense

Pos.	#	Name	Class
DT	93	Steve Alvord	So
LB	55	Ricky Andrews	Fr
LB	46	Tom Erlandson	Fr
DT	91	Brian Habib	Fr
LB	56	Ron Hadley	Jr
DT	90	Ron Holmes	Sr
CB	24	Vestee Jackson	Jr
LB	38	Joe Kelly	Jr
LB	56	Joe Krakoski	Sr
DT	95	Tony Lewis	Sr
LB	42	Tim Meamber (C)	Sr
CB	12	Ron Milus	Jr
CB	4	J. C. Pearson	Sr
FS	26	Tim Peoples	So
SS	39	Jim Rodgers (C)	Sr
LB	51	Reggie Rogers	So
LB	5	Fred Small	Sr
DB	31	Tony Zackery	Fr

Special teams

Pos.	#	Name	Class
P	9	Thane Cleland	So
K	18	Jeff Jaeger	So

Head coach

- Don James (10th year)

Coordinators/assistant coaches

- Gary Pinkel – OC
- Jim Lambright – DC

Legend

- (C) Team captain
- (S) Suspended
- (I) Ineligible
- Injured
- Redshirt

== NFL draft ==
Seven Huskies were selected in the 1985 NFL draft.

Player	Position	Round	Overall	Franchise
Ron Holmes	DT	1	8	Tampa Bay Buccaneers
Tim Meamber	LB	3	60	Minnesota Vikings
Danny Greene	WR	3	81	Seattle Seahawks
Joe Krakoski	LB	6	153	Houston Oilers
Mark Pattison	WR	7	188	Los Angeles Raiders
Jacque Robinson	RB	8	197	Buffalo Bills
Fred Small	LB	9	241	Pittsburgh Steelers
