= List of Washington Huskies in the NFL draft =

The Washington Huskies have had over 300 players drafted into the National Football League, including 31 first round picks since the league began holding the draft in 1936.

== Key ==
B	Back	K	Kicker	NT	Nose tackle
C	Center	LB	Linebacker	FB	Fullback
DB	Defensive back	P	Punter	HB	Halfback
DE	Defensive end	QB	Quarterback	WR	Wide receiver
DT	Defensive tackle	RB	Running back	G	Guard
E	End	T	Offensive tackle	TE	Tight end
S	Safety				

^{*}	Selected to an all-star game (AFL All-Star game, NFL All-Star game or Pro Bowl)
^{†}	Won a league championship (AFL championship, NFL championship, or Super Bowl)
^{‡}	Inducted into Pro Football Hall of Fame

== Players selected ==
Year	Rnd	Pick	Overall	Player name	Position	NFL team	Notes
1937	3	2	22	Max Starcevich	G	Brooklyn Dodgers	—
1937	4	10	40	John Wiatrak	C	Cleveland Rams	—
1937	5	6	46	Chuck Bond	T	Washington Redskins	—
1937	6	6	56	Jim Cain	B	Washington Redskins	—
1937	7	5	65	Byron Haines	E	Pittsburgh Steelers	—
1937	9	2	82	Ed Nowogroski	B	Brooklyn Dodgers	—
1938	4	1	26	Vic Markov	T	Cleveland Rams	—
1939	2	4	14	Charles Newton	B	Philadelphia Eagles	—
1939	10	8	88	Jimmy Johnston	B	Washington Redskins	—
1939	11	10	100	Merle Miller	B	New York Giants	—
1939	13	8	118	Steve Slivinski	G	Washington Redskins	—
1939	14	7	127	Art Means	G	Detroit Lions	—
1939	19	2	172	Frank Peters	E	Pittsburgh Steelers	—
1939	20	1	181	Tom Sheldrake	E	Pittsburgh Steelers	—
1940	9	2	72	Don Jones	B	Philadelphia Eagles	—
1941	1	4	4	Rudy Mucha	C	Cleveland Rams	—
1941	1	8	8	Dean McAdams	B	Brooklyn Dodgers	—
1941	3	4	19	Jay MacDowell	E	Cleveland Rams	—
1942	3	9	24	Ray Frankowski	G	Green Bay Packers	—
1942	6	3	43	Earl Younglove	E	Philadelphia Eagles	—
1942	10	1	81	Ernie Steele	B	Pittsburgh Steelers	—
1942	10	3	83	Jack Stackpool	B	Philadelphia Eagles	—
1942	20	2	182	Gene Conley	T	Cleveland Rams	—
1943	7	2	52	Walt Harrison	C	Philadelphia Eagles	—
1943	18	2	162	Bob Friedman	T	Philadelphia Eagles	—
1943	20	5	185	Carl Falk	T	Cleveland Rams	—
1943	22	5	205	Mark McCorkle	B	Cleveland Rams	—
1943	27	8	258	Pete Susick	B	Green Bay Packers	—
1944	6	10	53	Al Akins	B	Cleveland Rams	—
1944	7	6	60	Jack Tracy	E	Green Bay Packers	—
1944	13	10	130	Bob Erickson	B	Cleveland Rams	—
1944	19	5	191	Neil Brooks	B	New York Giants	—
1945	4	4	31	Don Deeks	T	Boston Yanks	—
1945	8	9	74	Sam Robinson	B	Philadelphia Eagles	—
1945	17	2	166	Arnie Weinmeister	DT	Boston Yanks	Pro Football Hall of Fame
1945	23	11	241	Bob Gilmore	B	Green Bay Packers	—
1945	24	8	249	James McCurdy	C	Washington Redskins	—
1946	8	7	67	Keith DeCourcy	B	Detroit Lions	—
1946	13	1	11	Lee Louis	B	Chicago Cardinals	—
1946	13	7	117	John Wingender	B	Philadelphia Eagles	—
1946	24	6	226	Maurice Stacy	B	Green Bay Packers	—
1946	26	6	246	John Norton	B	Green Bay Packers	—
1946	30	3	283	Gail Bruce	E	Pittsburgh Steelers	—
1947	8	8	63	Bill McGovern	C	Los Angeles Rams	—
1947	11	10	95	Larry Hatch	B	Chicago Bears	—
1947	14	1	116	Dick Hagen	E	Detroit Lions	—
1947	24	10	225	Gordon Berlin	C	Chicago Bears	—
1947	19	3	157	Dick Hagen	E	Brooklyn Dodgers	—
1948	9	1	66	Dick Ottele	B	New York Giants	—
1948	14	6	121	Fred Provo	B	Green Bay Packers	—
1948	25	5	230	Bob Levenhagen	G	Los Angeles Rams	—
1948	13	7	80	Dick Ottele	B	New York Yankees	—
1948	17	4	109	Bob Levenhagen	G	Los Angeles Dons	—
1948	21	1	138	Fred Provo	B	Chicago Rockets	—
1949	18	5	136	Larry Hatch	B	Los Angeles Dons	—
1950	20	5	253	George Bayer	T	Washington Redskins	—
1950	27	2	341	Chuck Olson	E	Los Angeles Rams	—
1951	10	10	121	Roland Kirkby	B	Los Angeles Rams	—
1952	1	9	9	Hugh McElhenny	RB	San Francisco 49ers	6× Pro Bowl, Pro Football Hall of Fame
1952	3	10	35	Don Heinrich	QB	New York Giants	—
1953	13	9	154	Bill Earley	B	San Francisco 49ers	—
1953	14	2	159	Dick Sprague	B	Chicago Cardinals	—
1953	26	11	312	Louis Yourkowski	T	Los Angeles Rams	—
1954	8	9	94	George Black	E	Los Angeles Rams	—
1954	9	1	98	Dean Chambers	T	Chicago Cardinals	—
1954	11	9	130	Duane Wardlow	T	Los Angeles Rams	—
1954	29	1	338	Bill Albrecht	E	Chicago Cardinals	—
1955	14	12	169	Fred Robinson	G	Cleveland Browns	—
1956	23	2	267	Mike Monroe	B	San Francisco 49ers	—
1957	3	2	27	George Strugar	T	Los Angeles Rams	—
1957	5	2	51	Dean Derby	B	Los Angeles Rams	—
1957	9	9	106	Don McCumby	T	Chicago Cardinals	—
1957	18	2	207	Credell Green	B	Green Bay Packers	—
1958	3	5	30	Jim Jones	B	Los Angeles Rams	—
1958	5	8	57	Dick Day	T	New York Giants	—
1959	21	6	246	Luther Carr	B	San Francisco 49ers	—
1959	21	8	248	Marv Bergmann	T	Los Angeles Rams	—
1959	28	6	330	Mike McCluskey	B	San Francisco 49ers	—
1959	30	9	357	Don Millich	B	Los Angeles Rams	—
1960 NFL	Expansion			Don Heinrich	QB	Dallas Cowboys	—
1960 AFL	Allocation			Luther Carr	RB	Oakland Raiders	—
1961 NFL	4	4	46	Ben Davidson	T	New York Giants	—
1961 NFL	6	6	76	George Fleming	B	Chicago Bears	—
1961 NFL	6	12	82	Lee Folkins	E	Green Bay Packers	—
1961 NFL	11	8	148	Bill Kinnune	G	St. Louis Cardinals	—
1961 NFL	17	4	228	Chuck Allen	G	Los Angeles Rams	—
1961 NFL	20	11	277	Don McKeta	B	New York Giants	—
1961 NFL	Expansion			Hugh McElhenny	HB	Minnesota Vikings	—
1961 AFL	2	4	12	George Fleming	HB	Oakland Raiders	—
1961 AFL	26	7	207	Bill Kinnune	G	Los Angeles Chargers	—
1961 AFL	27	6	214	Bob Schloredt	QB	Dallas Texans	—
1961 AFL	28	7	223	Chuck Allen	G	Los Angeles Chargers	—
1962 NFL	3	3	31	John Meyers	T	Los Angeles Rams	—
1962 NFL	10	13	139	Jim Skaggs	G	Philadelphia Eagles	—
1962 AFL	4	1	25	John Meyers	T	Oakland Raiders	—
1963 NFL	2	4	18	Ray Mansfield	C	Philadelphia Eagles	—
1963 NFL	4	10	52	Charley Mitchell	HB	Chicago Bears	—
1963 NFL	10	6	132	Rod Scheyer	T	Dallas Cowboys	—
1963 NFL	19	6	258	Jim Stiger	B	Dallas Cowboys	—
1963 AFL	5	5	37	Ray Mansfield	C	Denver Broncos	—
1963 AFL	18	5	141	Charley Mitchell	HB	Denver Broncos	—
1964 NFL	9	4	116	Jake Kupp	G	Dallas Cowboys	—
1964 NFL	12	10	164	Rick Sortun	G	St. Louis Cardinals	—
1964 AFL	18	2	138	Jerry Knoll	T	Kansas City Chiefs	—
1965 NFL	3	2	30	Jim Norton	T	San Francisco 49ers	—
1965 NFL	7	3	87	Charley Browning	B	Pittsburgh Steelers	—
1965 NFL	7	10	94	Junior Coffey	FB	Green Bay Packers	—
1965 NFL	10	6	132	Rick Redman	LB	Philadelphia Eagles	—
1965 AFL	5	6	38	Rick Redman	LB	San Diego Chargers	—
1965 AFL	16	2	122	Junior Coffey	HB	Houston Oilers	—
1966 NFL	Expansion			Junior Coffey	FB	Atlanta Falcons	—
1966 NFL	10	6	146	Mason Mitchell	HB	Dallas Cowboys	—
1966 NFL	14	4	204	Ron Medved	DB	Philadelphia Eagles	—
1966 NFL	18	6	266	Steve Orr	T	Dallas Cowboys	—
1966 AFL	14	3	121	Fred Forsberg	LB	Denver Broncos	—
1967	Expansion			Jake Kupp	G	New Orleans Saints	—
1967	1	16	16	Dave Williams	FL	St. Louis Cardinals	—
1967	4	15	95	Tom Greenlee	DB	Chicago Bears	—
1967	9	10	221	Greg Cass	C	Chicago Bears	—
1967	11	18	281	Omar Parker	G	Philadelphia Eagles	—
1967	17	15	434	Bill Barnes	C	Los Angeles Rams	—
1968	2	17	44	Steve Thompson	DE	New York Jets	—
1968	5	24	135	Don Martin	K	Los Angeles Rams	—
1968	7	24	189	Bill Glennon	DT	Pittsburgh Steelers	—
1968	9	24	243	Bob Richardson	T	Los Angeles Rams	—
1968	13	24	351	Dean Halverson	LB	Los Angeles Rams	—
1969	8	17	199	Harris Wood	FL	Minnesota Vikings	—
1969	15	21	385	George Jugum	LB	Los Angeles Rams	—
1970	2	26	52	Clyde Werner	LB	Kansas City Chiefs	—
1970	12	2	288	Rick Sharp	DT	Pittsburgh Steelers	—
1971	2	11	37	Ernie Janet	G	San Francisco 49ers	—
1971	2	14	40	Bo Cornell	RB	Cleveland Browns	—
1971	3	1	53	Bruce Jarvis	C	Buffalo Bills	—
1971	8	22	204	Ken Lee	LB	Detroit Lions	—
1972	5	14	118	Jim Krieg	WR	Denver Broncos	—
1973	3	6	58	John Brady	TE	Detroit Lions	—
1973	6	18	148	Phil Andre	DB	St. Louis Cardinals	—
1973	7	2	158	Bill Cahill	DB	New Orleans Saints	—
1973	12	18	304	Tom Scott	WR	Detroit Lions	—
1973	13	18	330	Al Kelso	C	San Francisco 49ers	—
1973	15	9	373	Calvin Jones	DB	Denver Broncos	—
1973	15	26	390	Kurt Matter	DE	Los Angeles Rams	—
1974	11	22	284	Rick Hayes	T	Los Angeles Rams	—
1975	3	4	56	Dave Pear	DT	Baltimore Colts	—
1975	11	9	269	Bob Martin	DE	Green Bay Packers	—
1975	17	22	438	Skip Boyd	P	Kansas City Chiefs	—
1976	2	9	37	Ray Pinney	C	Pittsburgh Steelers	—
1976	6	6	162	Dan Lloyd	LB	New York Giants	—
1976	8	10	219	Frank Reed	DB	Atlanta Falcons	—
1976	10	7	272	Paul Strohmeier	LB	Washington Redskins	—
1976	14	25	400	Al Burleson	DB	Los Angeles Rams	—
1976	15	11	414	Ron Olson	DB	Atlanta Falcons	—
1976	17	2	461	Chris Rowland	QB	Seattle Seahawks	—
1977	3	5	61	Robin Earl	RB	Chicago Bears	—
1977	9	18	241	Charles Jackson	LB	Denver Broncos	—
1977	11	26	305	Don Wardlow	TE	Dallas Cowboys	—
1978	1	16	16	Blair Bush	C	Cincinnati Bengals	—
1978	2	26	54	Dave Browning	DT	Oakland Raiders	—
1979	2	25	53	Jeff Toews	OG	Miami Dolphins	—
1979	3	1	57	Michael Jackson	LB	Seattle Seahawks	—
1979	6	3	140	Spider Gaines	WR	Kansas City Chiefs	—
1979	7	21	186	Roger Westlund	OT	Atlanta Falcons	—
1979	8	15	207	Nesby Glasgow	DB	Baltimore Colts	—
1980	1	9	9	Doug Martin	DT	Minnesota Vikings	—
1980	2	6	34	Mark Lee	CB	Green Bay Packers	—
1980	3	1	57	Tom Turnure	C	Detroit Lions	—
1980	5	17	127	Joe Steele	RB	Seattle Seahawks	—
1980	7	16	181	Chris Linnin	DT	New York Giants	—
1980	9	4	225	Stafford Mays	NG	St. Louis Cardinals	—
1980	10	7	256	Joe Sanford	OT	New York Giants	—
1980	12	7	312	Mike Lansford	PK	New York Giants	—
1981	1	23	23	Curt Marsh	OT	Oakland Raiders	—
1981	3	11	68	Randy Van Divier	OT	Baltimore Colts	—
1981	4	7	90	Tom Flick	QB	Washington Redskins	—
1981	9	1	222	Toussaint Tyler	TB	New Orleans Saints	—
1981	9	13	234	Rusty Olsen	DT	Denver Broncos	—
1982	5	24	135	Mark Jerue	LB	New York Jets	—
1982	7	2	169	Fletcher Jenkins	DT	Baltimore Colts	—
1983	2	25	53	Ray Horton	CB	Cincinnati Bengals	—
1983	3	26	82	Tony Caldwell	OLB	Oakland Raiders	—
1983	4	3	87	Chuck Nelson	PK	Los Angeles Rams	—
1983	4	13	97	Vince Newsome	S	Los Angeles Rams	—
1983	5	15	127	Mark Stewart	OLB	Minnesota Vikings	—
1983	5	21	133	Paul Skansi	WR	Pittsburgh Steelers	—
1983	6	16	156	Anthony Allen	WR	Atlanta Falcons	—
1983	8	12	208	Bill Stapleton	CB	Detroit Lions	—
1983	10	22	273	Eric Moran	OT	Dallas Cowboys	—
1983	11	18	296	Aaraon Williams	WR	St. Louis Cardinals	—
1983	12	10	317	Don Dow	OT	Seattle Seahawks	—
1984	5	1	113	Steve Pelluer	QB	Dallas Cowboys	—
1984	8	22	218	Scott Garnett	DT	Denver Broncos	—
1984	9	1	225	Rick Mallory	OG	Tampa Bay Buccaneers	—
1985	1	8	8	Ron Holmes	DE	Tampa Bay Buccaneers	—
1985	3	4	60	Tim Meamber	LB	Minnesota Vikings	—
1985	3	25	81	Danny Greene	WR	Seattle Seahawks	—
1985	6	13	153	Joe Krakoski	LB	Houston Oilers	—
1985	7	20	188	Mark Pattison	WR	Los Angeles Raiders	—
1985	8	1	197	Jacque Robinson	RB	Buffalo Bills	—
1985	9	17	241	Fred Small	LB	Pittsburgh Steelers	—
1986	1	11	11	Joe Kelly	LB	Cincinnati Bengals	—
1986	2	28	55	Vestee Jackson	CB	Chicago Bears	—
1986	3	16	71	Hugh Millen	QB	Los Angeles Rams	—
1986	5	22	132	Ron Hadley	LB	New York Jets	—
1987	1	7	7	Reggie Rogers	DT	Detroit Lions	—
1987	2	12	40	Lonzell Hill	WR	New Orleans Saints	—
1987	3	16	82	Jeff Jaeger	PK	Cleveland Browns	—
1987	7	6	174	Tim Peoples	WR	St. Louis Cardinals	—
1987	8	6	201	Steve Alvord	DL	St. Louis Cardinals	—
1987	8	11	206	Kevin Gogan	OT	Dallas Cowboys	—
1987	8	16	211	Rick Fenney	FB	Minnesota Vikings	—
1987	8	28	223	Rod Jones	TE	New York Giants	—
1987	11	20	299	Steve Roberts	DE	Denver Broncos	—
1988	3	21	76	Chris Chandler	QB	Indianapolis Colts	—
1988	8	8	201	Darryl Franklin	WR	Los Angeles Rams	—
1988	10	15	264	Brian Habib	DT	Minnesota Vikings	—
1988	11	7	284	Rick McLeod	OT	Seattle Seahawks	—
1988	12	9	316	Tom Erlandson	LB	Buffalo Bills	—
1989	3	11	67	Mike Zandofsky	OT	Phoenix Cardinals	—
1989	8	28	223	Tony Zackery	CB	New England Patriots	—
1989	10	9	260	Ricky Andrews	ILB	San Diego Chargers	—
1989	11	6	285	Brian Slater	WR	Pittsburgh Steelers	—
1989	12	27	334	Scott Jones	OT	Cincinnati Bengals	—
1990	1	23	23	Bern Brostek	C	Los Angeles Rams	—
1990	2	22	47	Dennis Brown	DT	San Francisco 49ers	—
1990	4	5	86	Cary Conklin	QB	Washington Redskins	—
1990	5	27	136	Le-Lo Lang	CB	Denver Broncos	—
1990	10	28	276	Martin Harrison	DE	San Francisco 49ers	—
1990	12	10	314	Andre Riley	WR	Cincinnati Bengals	—
1991	5	4	115	Greg Lewis	RB	Denver Broncos	—
1991	5	22	133	Charles Mincy	CB	Kansas City Chiefs	—
1991	11	27	305	Dean Kirkland	OG	Buffalo Bills	—
1991	12	5	311	Jeff Pahukoa	OT	Los Angeles Rams	—
1991	12	22	328	John Cook	G	Chicago Bears	—
1992	1	1	1	Steve Emtman	DT	Indianapolis Colts	—
1992	1	18	18	Dana Hall	CB	San Francisco 49ers	—
1992	3	5	61	Ed Cunningham	C	Phoenix Cardinals	—
1992	3	12	69	Aaron Pierce	TE	New York Giants	—
1992	3	13	68	Siupeli Malamala	OT	New York Jets	—
1992	5	18	130	Orlando McKay	WR	Green Bay Packers	—
1992	6	22	162	Mario Bailey	WR	Houston Oilers	—
1992	9	21	245	Donald Jones	SLB	New Orleans Saints	—
1992	11	10	290	Kris Rongen	OG	Seattle Seahawks	—
1992	12	6	314	Brett Collins	WLB	Green Bay Packers	—
1992	12	11	319	Chico Fraley	ILB	Seattle Seahawks	—
1993	1	9	9	Lincoln Kennedy	OT	Atlanta Falcons	—
1993	3	2	58	Billy Joe Hobert	QB	Los Angeles Raiders	—
1993	4	19	103	Jaime Fields	LB	Kansas City Chiefs	—
1993	5	6	118	Mark Brunell	QB	Green Bay Packers	—
1993	6	6	146	Dave Hoffmann	LB	Chicago Bears	—
1993	6	19	159	Darius Turner	FB	Kansas City Chiefs	—
1994	5	5	136	Pete Pierson	OT	Tampa Bay Buccaneers	—
1995	1	18	18	Napoleon Kaufman	TB	Oakland Raiders	—
1995	1	27	27	Mark Bruener	TE	Pittsburgh Steelers	—
1995	4	12	110	Eric Bjornson	TE	Dallas Cowboys	—
1995	4	34	132	Frank Garcia	C	Carolina Panthers	—
1995	5	37	171	Andrew Peterson	OT	Carolina Panthers	—
1996	2	6	36	Lawyer Milloy	S	New England Patriots	—
1996	2	29	59	Ernie Conwell	TE	St. Louis Rams	—
1996	6	29	196	Leon Neal	RB	Buffalo Bills	—
1997	2	13	43	Corey Dillon	RB	Cincinnati Bengals	—
1997	3	6	69	Bob Sapp	OG	Chicago Bears	—
1997	6	3	166	John Fiala	LB	Miami Dolphins	—
1998	2	2	32	Jerome Pathon	WR	Indianapolis Colts	—
1998	2	5	35	Tony Parrish	S	Chicago Bears	—
1998	2	10	40	Cameron Cleeland	TE	New Orleans Saints	—
1998	3	3	64	Olin Kreutz	OC	Chicago Bears	—
1998	3	27	88	Rashaan Shehee	RB	Kansas City Chiefs	—
1998	5	4	127	Jeremy Brigham	TE	Oakland Raiders	—
1998	5	13	136	Jerry Jensen	LB	Carolina Panthers	—
1998	5	16	139	Benji Olson	OG	Tennessee Titans	—
1998	6	7	160	Fred Coleman	WR	Buffalo Bills	—
1998	7	47	236	Jason Chorak	DE	St. Louis Rams	—
1999	3	16	77	Brock Huard	QB	Seattle Seahawks	—
1999	7	3	209	Tony Coats	OG	Cincinnati Bengals	—
2000	6	10	176	Jabari Issa	DE	Arizona Cardinals	—
2000	7	15	221	Lester Towns	LB	Carolina Panthers	—
2001	2	28	59	Marques Tuiasosopo	QB	Oakland Raiders	—
2001	5	1	132	Elliot Silvers	OT	San Diego Chargers	—
2001	5	3	134	Jeremiah Pharms	OLB	Cleveland Browns	—
2001	5	32	163	Hakim Akbar	SS	New England Patriots	—
2001	6	7	170	Chad Ward	OG	Jacksonville Jaguars	—
2002	1	28	28	Jerramy Stevens	TE	Seattle Seahawks	—
2002	2	10	59	Larry Tripplett	DT	Indianapolis Colts	—
2002	5	26	161	Omare Lowe	CB	Miami Dolphins	—
2004	1	9	9	Reggie Williams	WR	Jacksonville Jaguars	—
2004	2	15	47	Tank Johnson	DT	Chicago Bears	—
2004	3	16	79	Marquis Cooper	LB	Tampa Bay Buccaneers	—
2004	7	16	217	Cody Pickett	QB	San Francisco 49ers	—
2005	2	20	52	Khalif Barnes	OT	Jacksonville Jaguars	—
2005	6	31	205	Derrick Johnson	CB	San Francisco 49ers	—
2006	4	17	114	Joe Toledo	OT	Miami Dolphins	—
2007	4	4	103	Isaiah Stanback	WR	Dallas Cowboys	—
2007	4	27	126	Dashon Goldson	S	San Francisco 49ers	—
2010	3	15	79	Donald Butler	LB	San Diego Chargers	—
2010	3	22	86	Daniel Te'o-Nesheim	DE	Philadelphia Eagles	—
2011	1	8	8	Jake Locker	QB	Tennessee Titans	—
2011	3	20	84	Mason Foster	LB	Tampa Bay Buccaneers	—
2012	4	14	109	Alameda Ta'amu	DT	Pittsburgh Steelers	—
2012	5	16	151	Senio Kelemete	G	Arizona Cardinals	—
2013	1	22	22	Desmond Trufant	CB	Atlanta Falcons	—
2014	2	6	38	Austin Seferian-Jenkins	TE	Tampa Bay Buccaneers	—
2014	2	22	54	Bishop Sankey	RB	Tennessee Titans	—
2015	1	12	12	Danny Shelton	NT	Cleveland Browns	—
2015	1	18	18	Marcus Peters	CB	Kansas City Chiefs	—
2015	1	25	25	Shaq Thompson	LB	Carolina Panthers	—
2015	2	12	44	Hau'oli Kikaha	LB	New Orleans Saints	—
2016	6	45	220	Travis Feeney	OLB	Pittsburgh Steelers	—
2016	7	15	236	Dwayne Washington	RB	Detroit Lions	—
2017	1	9	9	John Ross	WR	Cincinnati Bengals	—
2017	2	1	33	Kevin King	CB	Green Bay Packers	—
2017	2	4	36	Budda Baker	S	Arizona Cardinals	—
2017	2	11	43	Sidney Jones	CB	Philadelphia Eagles	—
2017	6	31	214	Elijah Qualls	DT	Philadelphia Eagles	—
2018	1	12	12	Vita Vea	DT	Tampa Bay Buccaneers	—
2018	2	12	44	Dante Pettis	WR	San Francisco 49ers	—
2018	4	20	120	Will Dissly	TE	Seattle Seahawks	—
2018	6	42	216	Azeem Victor	LB	Oakland Raiders	—
2018	6	43	217	Keishawn Bierria	LB	Denver Broncos	—
2019	1	31	31	Kaleb McGary	T	Atlanta Falcons	—
2019	2	1	33	Byron Murphy	DB	Arizona Cardinals	—
2019	2	20	52	Drew Sample	TE	Cincinnati Bengals	—
2019	2	29	61	Taylor Rapp	DB	Los Angeles Rams	—
2019	4	32	134	Greg Gaines	DT	Los Angeles Rams	—
2019	5	4	142	Ben Burr-Kirven	LB	Seattle Seahawks	—
2019	5	34	172	Jordan Miller	DB	Atlanta Falcons	—
2019	7	20	234	Myles Gaskin	RB	Miami Dolphins	—
2020	4	16	122	Jacob Eason	QB	Indianapolis Colts	—
2020	5	14	160	Nick Harris	C	Cleveland Browns	—
2021	1	32	32	Joe Tryon-Shoyinka	OLB	Tampa Bay Buccaneers	—
2021	2	9	41	Levi Onwuzurike	DT	Detroit Lions	—
2021	3	36	100	Elijah Molden	CB	Tennessee Titans	—
2021	5	22	166	Keith Taylor	CB	Carolina Panthers	—
2022	1	21	21	Trent McDuffie	DB	Kansas City Chiefs	—
2022	2	7	39	Kyler Gordon	CB	Chicago Bears	—
2022	4	1	105	Cade Otton	TE	Tampa Bay Buccaneers	—
2022	5	28	171	Luke Wattenberg	C	Denver Broncos	—
2024	1	8	8	Michael Penix Jr.	QB	Atlanta Falcons	—
2024	1	9	9	Rome Odunze	WR	Chicago Bears	—
2024	1	20	20	Troy Fautanu	G	Pittsburgh Steelers	—
2024	2	5	37	Ja'Lynn Polk	WR	New England Patriots	—
2024	2	30	62	Roger Rosengarten	T	Baltimore Ravens	—
2024	3	10	74	Bralen Trice	DE	Atlanta Falcons	—
2024	3	29	92	Jalen McMillan	WR	Tampa Bay Buccaneers	—
2024	5	25	160	Edefuan Ulofoshio	LB	Buffalo Bills	—
2024	5	26	161	Dominique Hampton	DB	Washington Commanders	—
2024	7	26	246	Devin Culp	TE	Tampa Bay Buccaneers	—
2025	7	10	226	Carson Bruener	LB	Pittsburgh Steelers	—
2026	2	7	39	Denzel Boston	WR	Cleveland Browns	—
2026	3	8	72	Tacario Davis	CB	Cincinnati Bengals	—
2026	4	8	108	Jonah Coleman	RB	Denver Broncos	—
2026	4	27	127	Carver Willis	T	San Francisco 49ers	—
2026	4	39	139	Ephesians Prysock	CB	San Francisco 49ers	—
2026	6	27	208	Anterio Thompson	DT	Atlanta Falcons	—
2026	7	17	233	Zach Durfee	DE	Jacksonville Jaguars	—

== Notable undrafted players ==
Note: No drafts held before 1920

Debut year	Player name	Position	Debut NFL/AFL team	Notes
1964	Dave Kopay	RB	San Francisco 49ers	—
1970	Jeff Jordan	RB	Los Angeles Rams	—
1974	Glen Bonner	RB	San Diego Chargers	—
1977	Mike Baldassin	LB	San Francisco 49ers	—
1981	Rich Camarillo	P	New England Patriots	—
1984	Vince Albritton	DB	Dallas Cowboys	—
1984	Warren Moon	QB	Houston Oilers	Pro Bowl (1988), (1989), (1990), (1991), (1992), (1993), (1994), (1995), (1997), Pro Football Hall of Fame
1986	J. C. Pearson	DB	Kansas City Chiefs	—
1987	Garth Thomas	T	Seattle Seahawks	—
1992	Tyrone Rodgers	DT	Seattle Seahawks	—
1993	Darryl Hall	DB	Denver Broncos	—
1994	Beno Bryant	RB	Los Angeles Rams	—
1994	D'Marco Farr	DT	Los Angeles Rams	Pro Bowl (1999)
1994	Jamal Fountaine	DE	San Francisco 49ers	—
1996	Damon Huard	QB	Cincinnati Bengals	—
1996	Lamar Lyons	DB	Oakland Raiders	—
1997	Ink Aleaga	LB	New Orleans Saints	—
1997	David Richie	DT	Denver Broncos	Super Bowl champion (XXXII)
1999	Bryan Pittman	LS	Cleveland Browns	—
2000	Dane Looker	WR	St. Louis Rams	—
2001	Wes Call	T	San Francisco 49ers	—
2003	Kevin Ware	TE	Washington Redskins	—
2004	Roc Alexander	DB	Denver Broncos	—
2004	Rich Alexis	RB	Jacksonville Jaguars	—
2007	Stanley Daniels	G	St. Louis Rams	—
2007	C. J. Wallace	DB	Seattle Seahawks	—
2009	Marcel Reece	RB	Oakland Raiders	Pro Bowl (2012), (2013), (2014), (2015)
2011	Victor Aiyewa	LB	Tampa Bay Buccaneers	—
2012	Jermaine Kearse	WR	Seattle Seahawks	Super Bowl champion (XLVIII)
2012	Chris Polk	RB	Philadelphia Eagles	—
2014	Travis Coons	K	Tennessee Titans	—
2014	Kevin Smith	WR	Arizona Cardinals	—
2015	John Timu	LB	Chicago Bears	—
2016	Marvin Hall	WR	Oakland Raiders	—
2016	Cory Littleton	LB	Los Angeles Rams	Pro Bowl (2017)
2016	Jaydon Mickens	WR	Oakland Raiders	Super Bowl champion (LV)
2016	Joshua Perkins	TE	Atlanta Falcons	—
2017	Darrell Daniels	TE	Indianapolis Colts	—
2017	Jake Eldrenkamp	G	Los Angeles Rams	—
2018	Lavon Coleman	RB	Houston Texans	—
2018	Coleman Shelton	C	San Francisco 49ers	Super Bowl champion (LVI)
2018	Zeke Turner	LB	Arizona Cardinals	—
2019	Jake Browning	QB	Minnesota Vikings	—
2019	JoJo McIntosh	S	Washington Redskins	—
2020	Salvon Ahmed	RB	San Francisco 49ers	—
2020	Hunter Bryant	TE	Detroit Lions	—
2020	Myles Bryant	DB	New England Patriots	—
2023	Cam Bright	LB	Seattle Seahawks	–
2023	Alex Cook	S	New York Giants	–
2023	Jaxson Kirkland	G	Cincinnati Bengals	–
2023	Corey Luciano	C	San Francisco 49ers	–
2023	Jeremiah Martin	DE	Cleveland Browns	–
2023	Jordan Perryman	CB	Las Vegas Raiders	–
2024	Ulumoo Ale	NT	Carolina Panthers	–
2024	Ralen Goforth	LB	Green Bay Packers	–
2024	Dillon Johnson	RB	Tennessee Titans	–
2024	Tuli Letuligasenoa	DT	Los Angeles Rams	–
2024	Jack Westover	TE	Seattle Seahawks	–
2025	Keleki Latu	TE	Buffalo Bills	—
2025	Sebastian Valdez	DT	San Francisco 49ers	—
2026	Omari Evans	WR	Kansas City Chiefs	—
2026	Quentin Moore	TE	Washington Commanders	—
