= San José High School =

Location
- 275 North 24th Street; San Jose, California 95116-1109; United States; 37°20′59″N 121°52′16″W

Information
- Founded: 1863; 163 years ago
- School district: San José Unified School District
- Superintendent: Nancy Albarrán
- Principal: Jeannette Harding
- Faculty: 59
- Teaching staff: 48.95 (FTE)
- Grades: 9-12
- Student to teacher ratio: 18.53
- Colors: Crimson & Gray
- Slogan: "It's All About Bulldog Pride"
- Song: Hail To Thee
- Fight song: Second half of the New Colonial March
- Athletics conference: Blossom Valley Athletic League
- Mascot: Bulldog
- Accreditation: WASC, IB, Project Lead the Way
- Newspaper: The Herald
- Yearbook: The Bell
- Website: School website

San José High School is a selective public magnet school in San Jose, California. Founded in 1863, it is California's third oldest public high school (after Lowell High School in San Francisco and Sacramento High School in Sacramento).

== History ==
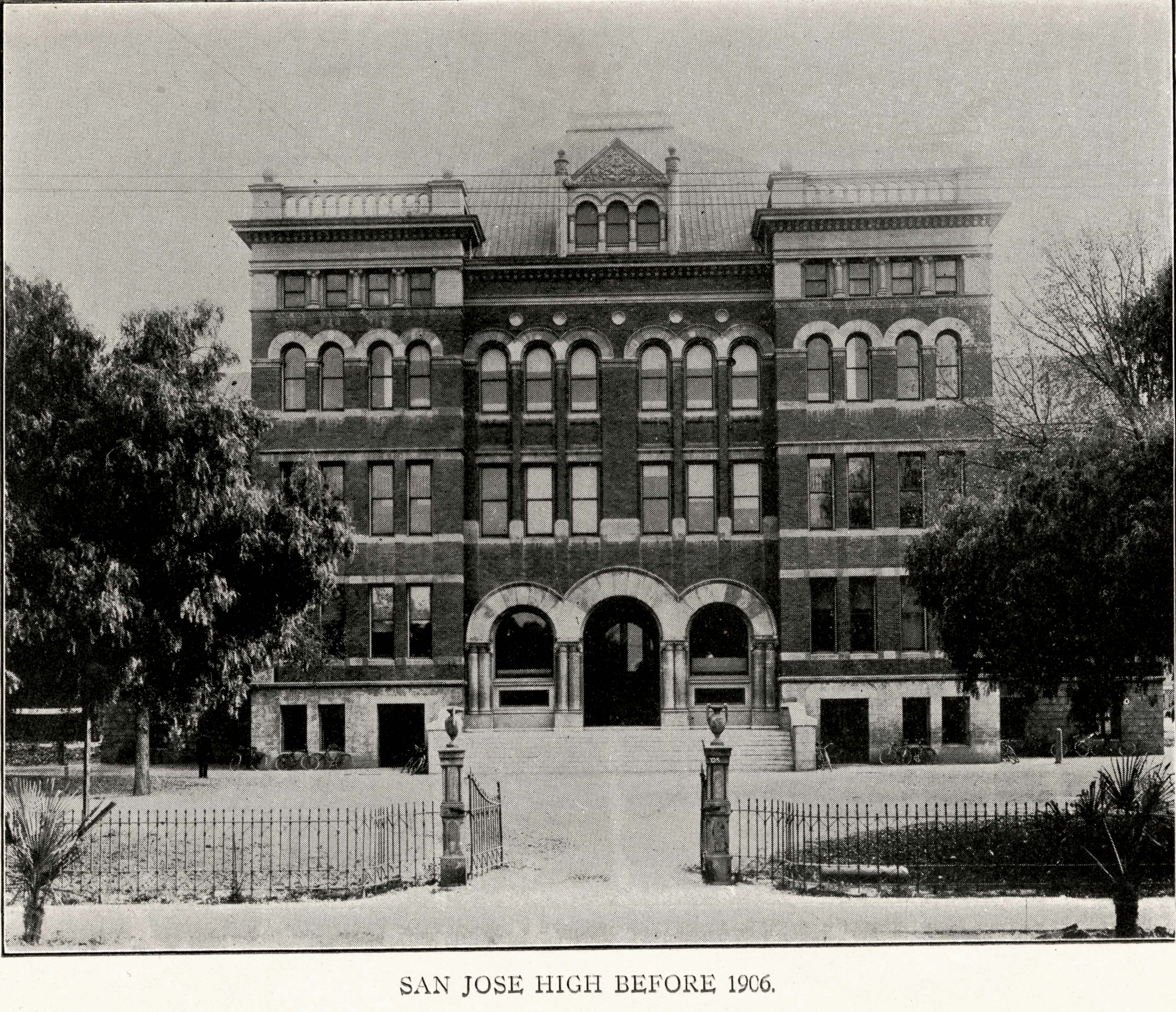
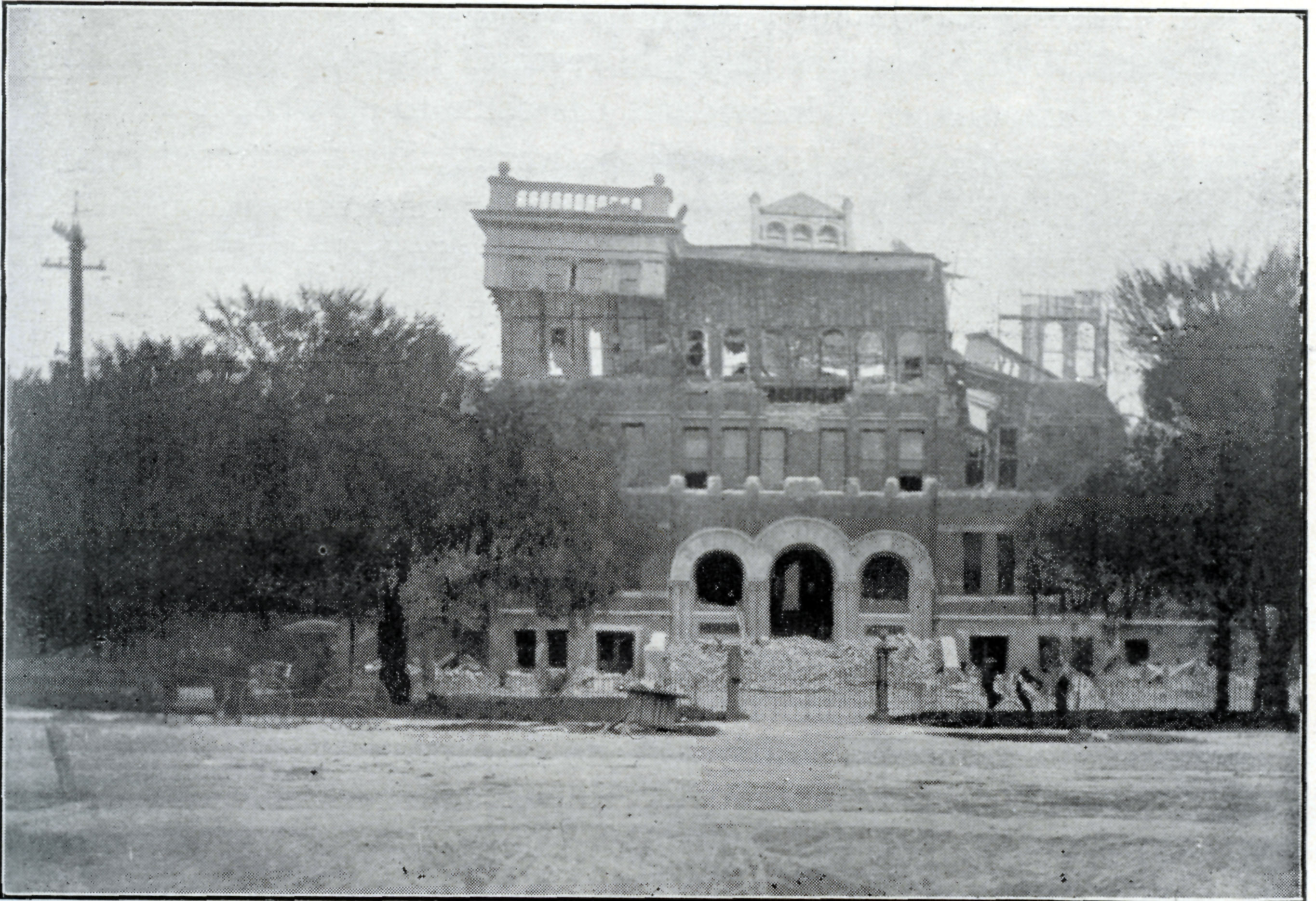
San José High School's second building, before and after the 1906 San Francisco earthquake

San José High School opened in 1863 in a room above Orbon's flour store at 210 South 1st Street. On January 1, 1868, it moved to a purpose-built $20,000 building at Santa Clara and 7th Streets that also housed Horace Mann Elementary. The high school occupied the upper floor of the building.

In 1898 San José High School was relocated to One Washington Square, 250 E. San Fernando Street between 6th and 7th Streets, where it remained until 1952. This location was on the [San Jose State College] campus. The 1898 building was three stories, of brick and stone, and cost $75,000; it was destroyed in the 1906 earthquake and after the school shared facilities for two years with [Lincoln Elementary School on Almaden Ave and Vine Street(San Jose, California), it moved back to a replacement building on the same site, which was used from 1908 to 1951. This high school campus was designed by Pasadena architect F. S. Allen in Mission Revival style and cost $175,000; it housed different subjects in separate buildings connected by arcades forming courtyards.

In 1951, intending to expand the college, the State of California rescinded its permission for the high school to be located on the San José State campus, and the school moved in 1952 to its present location at the corner of 24th and Julian Streets. The original $2,500,000 building, by Ernest J. Kump, was chosen that year by the Museum of Modern Art as one of 43 outstanding examples of modern architecture. It has since been greatly expanded, including a swimming pool in 1959, two new wings and a full theatrical stage in 1961, and a new science building and a new career technology engineering building in the first decade of the 21st century.

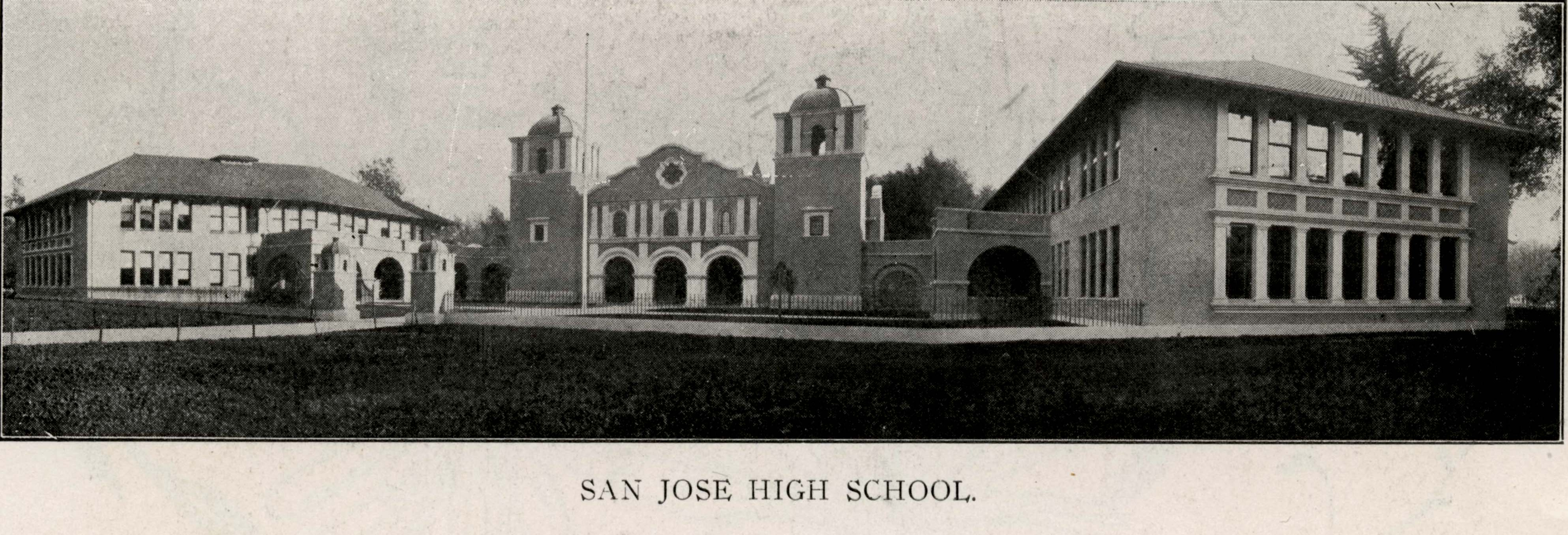
The third building operated between 1908 and 1951.

In 1985, the school was renamed San Jose High Academy as part of the federal magnet schools concept, but on March 25, 2010, it returned to its original name, San Jose High School.

In the 21st century the school's enrollment increased to 1200, the largest population since the late 1980s. The principal is Gloria Marchant, a naturalized Canadian who became a U.S. citizen in a ceremony at the school in May 2018.

== Academics ==
The school has offered the International Baccalaureate program since 1985, and since 1999 has offered the IB Middle Years Program along with its major feeder middle school, Muwekma Ohlone Middle School. It was recognized as a California Distinguished High School in 1990. In 2010, the engineering building was built to further stretch the minds of the students. Since then, Bulldog Robotics 581 has proven to be a very successful program In Newsweek magazine's 2005 ranking of United States high schools, San Jose High Academy was ranked 220th.

== Athletics ==
The following sports are offered at San José High School:

- Baseball
- Basketball (Girls' and Boys')
- Softball
- Football
- Wrestling
- Soccer (Girls' and Boys')
- Badminton
- Track and field
- Cross Country
- Tennis
- Swim
- Volleyball

=== Big Bone Game ===
The football teams of San José High School and Lincoln High School face off at San Jose City College each Thanksgiving in the Big Bone Game. This rivalry game has been held since 1943; it gets its name from a San José High School student who found a large steer leg in his father's butcher shop in 1945 and declared it the trophy for the winning school. The Junior Varsity football teams from both schools hold a Little Bone Game the Thursday prior to the Big Bone Game.

== Notable alumni ==
- Samuel J. Call, Class of 1876, doctor with the U.S. Revenue Cutter Service and recipient of the Congressional Gold Medal
- Hal Rhyne, Class of 1920, Pittsburgh Pirates, Boston Red Sox, Chicago White Sox
- Jack Z. Anderson, class of 1923, former U.S. congressman.
- John C. Young, class of 1930, Chinese American Community Leader.
- Don Edwards, class of 1932, former FBI agent and U.S. congressman.
- Chuck Taylor, Class of 1938, All American Guard, Coach, Athletic Director, Miami Seahawks
- Franklin Mieuli, class of 1940, former principal owner of the Golden State Warriors NBA team.
- Irene Dalis, class of 1942, founder of Opera San José.
- Jay DeFeo, class of 1946, abstract expressionist artist.
- Norman Mineta, class of 1949, former San Jose mayor, U.S. congressman and United States Secretary of Transportation.
- Jim Cadile, Class of 1957, 11 years in NFL, Chicago Bears
- Mike Honda, class of 1959, former state assemblyman and U.S. congressman.
- Jack Pierce, Class of 1968, MLB Atlanta Braves, Detroit Tiger
- Sam Piraro, Class of 1970, College Head Baseball Coach; led SJSU to its 1st College World Series in year 2000
- Jacque Robinson, class of 1981, MVP of 1982 Rose Bowl and 1985 Orange Bowl.
- Bob Santos, class of 1989, boxing trainer, manager, and cutman.
- Cung Le, class of 1990, UFC fighter and actor.
