= Robert Santos (disambiguation) =

Robert Santos (born 1957) is an American statistician.

Robert Santos may also refer to:

- Bob Santos (activist) (1934–2016), American minority rights activist
- Bob Santos (boxing trainer), American boxing trainer, manager, and cutman
- Bobby Santos III (born 1985), American racing driver
- Robert Santos (footballer) (born 2003), Brazilian footballer
