= Rod Jones =

Rod Jones may refer to:

== Sports ==
=== American football ===
- Rod Jones (cornerback) (born 1964), American football cornerback in the National Football League and sprinter
- Rod Jones (offensive lineman) (born 1974), American football tackle in the National Football League
- Rod Jones (tight end) (1964–2018), former professional American football tight end

=== Other sports ===
- Rod Jones (English footballer) (born 1945), goalkeeper for Rotherham United, Burnley and others
- Rod Jones (Welsh footballer) (1946–2022), Welsh footballer also known as 'Roddy'
- Roddy Jones (born 1944), British Olympic swimmer

== Others ==
- Rod Jones (author) (born 1953), Australian author
- Rod Jones (musician) (born 1976), guitarist with the band Idlewild

== See also ==
- Rodney Jones (disambiguation)
- Roderick Jones (disambiguation)
