= Roderick Jones =

Roderick Jones may refer to:

- Roderick Jones (journalist), (1877–1962), British director of Reuters
- Roderick Jones (baritone) (1910–1992), Welsh opera singer
- Roddy Jones (born 1944), British Olympic swimmer
- Rod Jones (cornerback) (born 1964), American football player
- Rod Jones (tight end) (1964–2018), American football player

== See also ==
- Rod Jones (disambiguation)
