= 1984 Oklahoma State Cowboys football team =

American college football season

1984 Oklahoma State Cowboys football

Gator Bowl champion

Gator Bowl, W 21–14 vs. South Carolina
- Conference: Big Eight Conference

Ranking
- Coaches: No. 5
- AP: No. 7
- Record: 10–2 (5–2 Big 8)
- Head coach: Pat Jones (1st season)
- Offensive coordinator: Larry Coker (2nd season)
- Home stadium: Lewis Field

1984 Big Eight Conference football standings
	Conf.					Overall
Team	W		L		T	W		L		T
No. 4 Nebraska +	6	–	1	–	0	10	–	2	–	0
No. 6 Oklahoma +	6	–	1	–	0	9	–	2	–	1
No. 7 Oklahoma State	5	–	2	–	0	10	–	2	–	0
Kansas	4	–	3	–	0	5	–	6	–	0
Missouri	2	–	4	–	1	3	–	7	–	1
Kansas State	2	–	4	–	1	3	–	7	–	1
Colorado	1	–	6	–	0	1	–	10	–	0
Iowa State	0	–	5	–	2	2	–	7	–	2
+ – Conference co-champions; Rankings from AP Poll

The 1984 Oklahoma State Cowboys football team represented Oklahoma State University as a member of the Big Eight Conference during the 1984 NCAA Division I-A football season. Led by first-year head coach Pat Jones, the Cowboys compiled an overall record of 10–2 with a mark of 5–2 in conference play, placing third in the Big 8. Oklahoma State played home game at Lewis Field in Stillwater, Oklahoma.

== Schedule ==
Date	Opponent	Rank	Site	Result	Attendance	Source
September 8	at No. 12 Arizona State*		Sun Devil Stadium; Tempe, AZ	W 45–3	70,224	
September 15	Bowling Green*	No. 13	Lewis Field; Stillwater, OK	W 31–14	46,000	
September 22	San Diego State*	No. 12	Lewis Field; Stillwater, OK	W 19–16	46,500	
September 29	at Tulsa*	No. 10	Skelly Stadium; Tulsa, OK (rivalry)	W 31–7	40,235	
October 6	at No. 8 Nebraska	No. 9	Memorial Stadium; Lincoln, NE	L 3–17	76,368	
October 20	Kansas	No. 12	Lewis Field; Stillwater, OK	W 47–10	44,000	
October 27	Colorado^{†}	No. 10	Lewis Field; Stillwater, OK	W 20–14	47,800	
November 3	at Kansas State	No. 7	KSU Stadium; Manhattan, KS	W 34–6	26,300	
November 10	Missouri	No. 7	Lewis Field; Stillwater, OK	W 31–13	48,200	
November 17	Iowa State	No. 4	Lewis Field; Stillwater, OK	W 16–10	32,000	
November 24	at No. 2 Oklahoma	No. 3	Oklahoma Memorial Stadium; Norman, OK (Bedlam Series)	L 14–24	76,198	
December 28	vs. No. 7 South Carolina*	No. 9	Gator Bowl Stadium; Jacksonville, FL (Gator Bowl)	W 21–14	82,138	
*Non-conference game; ^{†}Homecoming; Rankings from AP Poll released prior to the game

== Rankings ==
Ranking movements Legend: ██ Increase in ranking ██ Decrease in ranking — = Not ranked ( ) = First-place votes
	Week															
Poll	Pre	1	2	3	4	5	6	7	8	9	10	11	12	13	14	Final
AP	—	—	13	12	10	9	13	12	10	7	7	4	3 (3)	9	9	7
Coaches	—	—	14	11	11	8	13	12	11	10	7	4	2 (2)	9	9	5

== Game summaries ==
=== At Nebraska ===
Oklahoma State at Nebraska

Team	1	2	3	4	Total
No. 9 Cowboys	3	0	0	0	3
• No. 8 Cornhuskers	0	0	0	17	17

- Date: October 6
- Location: Memorial Stadium, Lincoln, Nebraska
- Game attendance: 76,368

=== At Oklahoma ===
Oklahoma State at Oklahoma

Team	1	2	3	4	Total
Cowboys	0	7	7	0	14
• Sooners	0	7	10	7	24

- Date: November 24
- Location: Oklahoma Memorial Stadium
- Game attendance: 76,198

== Roster ==
1984 Oklahoma State Cowboys football team roster
Players
Coaches
Offense

Pos.	#	Name	Class
WR		Lynn Beck
OL		Paul Blair
WR		Kenneth Brown
OL		Derek Burton
RB		Kelly Cook
RB		Charles Crawford
TE		J.R. Dillard
TE		Barry Hanna
WR		Jamie Harris
QB		Rusty Hilger
RB		Shawn Jones
WR		Malcolm Lewis
RB		Joe Miller
OL		Ralph Partida
WR		Bobby Riley
OL		Chuck Shanklin
RB	34	Thurman Thomas	Fr
RB		Will Timmons
OL		David Tucker
WR		Terry Werner
QB		Ronnie Williams
RB		Kenny Zachary

Defense

Pos.	#	Name	Class
LB		Ricky Adams
DB		Rod Brown
DL		James Ham
DL		Rodney Harding
DB		Adam Hinds
DB		Mike Hudson
LB		Matt Monger
DB	44	Mark Moore	So
DL		Leslie O'Neal
DL		Harry Roberts
DL		Warren Thompson
DL		John Washington
DL		David Webb

Special teams

Pos.	#	Name	Class
K		Larry Roach

Head coach

- Pat Jones

Coordinators/assistant coaches

- Larry Coker – Offensive coordinator
- Houston Nutt – Quarterback/Wide receivers
- Bill Shimek – Running backs
- Brad Seely – Offensive line
- George Walstad – Defensive line
- Willie Anderson – Defensive ends
- Reggie Herring – Linebackers
- Kevin Steele – Linebackers/tight ends
- Paul Jette – Defensive backs

Legend

- (C) Team captain
- (S) Suspended
- (I) Ineligible
- Injured
- Redshirt

== After the season ==
The 1985 NFL draft was held on April 30–May 1, 1985. The following Cowboys were selected.

Round	Pick	Player	Position	NFL club
6	143	Rusty Hilger	Quarterback	Los Angeles Raiders
7	177	Jamie Harris	Wide receiver	Washington Redskins
8	208	Matt Monger	Linebacker	New York Jets
9	251	Adam Hinds	Defensive back	Miami Dolphins
12	332	Raymond Polk	Defensive back	Los Angeles Raiders
