= 1984 Nebraska Cornhuskers football team =

American college football season

1984 Nebraska Cornhuskers football

Big 8 co-champion Sugar Bowl champion

Sugar Bowl, W 28–10 vs. LSU
- Conference: Big Eight Conference

Ranking
- Coaches: No. 3
- AP: No. 4
- Record: 10–2 (6–1 Big 8)
- Head coach: Tom Osborne (12th season)
- Offensive scheme: I formation
- Defensive coordinator: Charlie McBride (4th season)
- Base defense: 5–2
- Home stadium: Memorial Stadium

1984 Big Eight Conference football standings
	Conf.					Overall
Team	W		L		T	W		L		T
No. 4 Nebraska +	6	–	1	–	0	10	–	2	–	0
No. 6 Oklahoma +	6	–	1	–	0	9	–	2	–	1
No. 7 Oklahoma State	5	–	2	–	0	10	–	2	–	0
Kansas	4	–	3	–	0	5	–	6	–	0
Missouri	2	–	4	–	1	3	–	7	–	1
Kansas State	2	–	4	–	1	3	–	7	–	1
Colorado	1	–	6	–	0	1	–	10	–	0
Iowa State	0	–	5	–	2	2	–	7	–	2
+ – Conference co-champions; Rankings from AP Poll

The 1984 Nebraska Cornhuskers football team represented the University of Nebraska–Lincoln in the 1984 NCAA Division I-A football season. The team was coached by Tom Osborne and played their home games in Memorial Stadium in Lincoln, Nebraska.

== Schedule ==
Date	Time	Opponent	Rank	Site	TV	Result	Attendance	Source
September 8	1:30 pm	Wyoming*	No. 2	Memorial Stadium; Lincoln, NE		W 42–7	76,125	
September 15	1:30 pm	Minnesota*	No. 1	Memorial Stadium; Lincoln, NE (rivalry)		W 38–7	76,077	
September 22	2:30 pm	at No. 8 UCLA*	No. 1	Rose Bowl; Pasadena, CA	CBS	W 42–3	71,355	
September 29	11:00 am	at Syracuse*	No. 1	Carrier Dome; Syracuse, NY	USA	L 9–17	47,280	
October 6	2:30 pm	No. 9 Oklahoma State^{†}	No. 8	Memorial Stadium; Lincoln, NE	ABC	W 17–3	76,368	
October 13	1:30 pm	Missouri	No. 6	Memorial Stadium; Lincoln, NE (rivalry)	USA	W 33–23	76,319	
October 20	2:30 pm	at Colorado	No. 5	Folsom Field; Boulder, CO (rivalry)		W 24–7	52,124	
October 27	1:30 pm	Kansas State	No. 4	Memorial Stadium; Lincoln, NE (rivalry)		W 62–14	76,068	
November 3	1:30 pm	at Iowa State	No. 3	Cyclone Stadium; Ames, IA (rivalry)		W 44–0	52,919	
November 10	1:30 pm	at Kansas	No. 2	Memorial Stadium; Lawrence, KS (rivalry)		W 41–7	50,653	
November 17	2:30 pm	No. 6 Oklahoma	No. 1	Memorial Stadium; Lincoln, NE (rivalry)	ABC	L 7–17	76,323	
January 1, 1985	7:00 pm	vs. No. 12 LSU*	No. 5	Louisiana Superdome; New Orleans, LA (Sugar Bowl)	ABC	W 28–10	75,608	
*Non-conference game; ^{†}Homecoming; Rankings from AP Poll released prior to the game; All times are in Central time

== Roster ==
Anderson, Paul (So.) FB; Augustyn, Joe (So.) TE; Bailey, Dan (So.) OG; Banderas, Tom #83 (So.) TE; Behning, Mark #73 (Sr.) OT; Behrens, Vance (So.) WB; Biggers, Kevin #13 (Sr.) MON; Blakeman, Clete #16 (Fr.) QB; Blankenship, Brian #70 (Jr.) OG; Bourn, Don #92 (Sr.) TE; Bourne, David (So.) DE; Bryan, Dave (So.) OT; Bunger, Jon #97 (Jr.) DT; Burke, Dave #33 (Sr.) CB; Carl, Mike #42 (So.) CB; Carpenter, Todd (So.) OT; Carr, Chris #37 (So.) S Cartwright, Charlie #31 (So.) MON; Casterline, Dan #24 (Jr.) MON; Chealey, Gene (So.) CB; Clark, Bret #10 (Sr.) S Clayton, McCathorn (So.) QB; Cooper, Mark #54 (So.) C Daffer, Chad #46 (Jr.) LB; Daum, Mark #51 (Sr.) LB; Demmel, Tom (So.) PK; Diaz, Mark (So.) MON; Dietz, Dave #98 (Jr.) TE; Dittmer, Jim #59 (Jr.) OT; Douglas, Don (So.) QB; DuBose, Doug #22 (So.) IB; Fisher, Todd #6 (Jr.) MON; Forch, Steve #38 (So.) LB; Frain, Todd #80 (Jr.) TE; Galois, Ron (So.) OG; Gamble, Jason #86 (Fr.) SE; Gangwish, Paul (Sr.) DE; Gatson, Pernell (So.) WB; Graeber, Ken #52 (Sr.) MG; Green, Derrick (So.) OT; Greene, Ricky #5 (Sr.) CB; Grimminger, Harry #58 (Sr.) OG; Haecker, Kelly (So.) CB; Hall, Mike (So.) TE; Harris, Neil #11 (Sr.) CB; Hawkins, Hendley (So.) QB; Hedlund, Mike (So.) FB; Heibel, Micah (So.) FB; Hiemer, Brian #94 (Sr.) TE; Hill, Scott (So.) DB; Hoefler, Mike #59 (So.) OG; Holloway, Tony #43 (So.) DE	Holscher, Jim (So.) WB; Hoskins, Thurman #32 (So.) IB; Jamrog, Jeff (So.) DE; Johnson, Brad #64 (So.) OT; Jones, Keith #6 (Fr.) IB; Jones, Lee #98 (So.) DT; Kaelin, Ken #49 (So.) FB; Kelley, Jon (Fr.) IB; Kimball, Scott #88 (Sr.) SE; King, Scott (So.) CB; Kingston, Bob #37 (Jr.) IB; Klein, Dale (So.) PK; Knox, Mike #44 (Sr.) LB; Kreikemeier, Keith (Jr.) OG; LeCompte, Butch (So.) OT; Lewis, Bill #68 (Jr.) C Lightner, Keven #66 (Fr.) OG; Lindstrom, Roger #23 (Jr.) WB; Livingston, Scott #48 (Sr.) PK; Macias, Bill #78 (So.) OT; Maggard, Rob #72 (So.) OT; Mattingly, Tom (So.) S McCashland, Mike #2 (Sr.) MON; McCormick, John #61 (So.) OG; McCoy, Dan #40 (Jr.) LB; Miles, Paul #21 (Jr.) IB; Mlinar, Jerry (So.) QB; Moore, Brian (Jr.) TE; Moritz, Mike (So.) C Morrow, Tom #77 (Jr.) OT; Mullins, Marty (So.) SE; Munford, Marc #41 (So.) LB; Nelson, Ray (So.) WB; Nichols, John #55 (So.) C Noel, Jack #56 (Jr.) C Noonan, Danny #97 (So.) DT; Olson, Todd #63 (So.) OG; Opie, Harlan (So.) DE; Orton, Greg #67 (Sr.) OG; Otte, Mike (So.) SE; Paige, Woody #9 (Jr.) CB; Palmer, Tony (So.) DT; Parker, Paul (So.) CB; Parker, Stan #74 (So.) OG; Parsons, Kevin #35 (So.) LB; Pokorny, Brian #18 (Jr.) CB; Porter, Scott #36 (Sr.) FB; Proffitt, Todd #34 (Jr.) LB; Rathman, Tom #26 (Jr.) FB; Reeves, Gregg #84 (Jr.) DE; Reinhardt, John #62 (Sr.) MG; Reynolds, Rod #93 (Jr.) DT	Rogers, Phil (Jr.) MG; Roth, Tim #65 (Jr.) OT; Rother, Tim (So.) OT; Rozier, Guy #4 (Jr.) MON; Schaaf, Jim (So.) OG; Schneider, Dave #1 (Jr.) PK; Schneider, Gary #3 (Jr.) CB; Schnitzler, Craig #13 (So.) PK; Schnitzler, Robb #85 (So.) SE; Schoettger, Scott (Sr.) SE; Sellentin, Jeff (So.) OG; Shaw, Pat (So.) LB; Shead, Ken #99 (Jr.) MG; Sheppard, Von #7 (So.) WB; Siebler, Bryan #19 (So.) S Skow, Jim #96 (Jr.) DT; Smith, Brad #81 (Jr.) DE; Smith, Jeff #28 (Sr.) IB; Smith, Rod (So.) SE; Spachman, Chris #76 (So.) DT; Storer, Lance (So.) OG; Strasburger, Matt (So.) S Strasburger, Scott #90 (Sr.) DE; Stuckey, Rob #75 (Sr.) DT; Sundberg, Craig #15 (Sr.) QB; Swanson, Shane #17 (Sr.) WB; Taylor, Jeff #12 (So.) QB; Tenopir, Todd (So.) PK; Thayer, Dan (So.) S Thomas, Anthony #53 (Sr.) OG; Thomas, Stephen (So.) MG; Thompson, Jim #39 (Sr.) WB; Tomjack, Jeff (So.) MON; Traynowicz, Mark #57 (Sr.) C Tucker, Scott #89 (Jr.) DE; Turner, Travis #14 (Jr.) QB; Tyrer, Brad (So.) DE; Vinger, Eric (So.) PK; Wade, Stanley #55 (Jr.) LB; Washington, Brian #43 (Fr.) MON; Watkins, Dennis #27 (Jr.) CB; Weber, Bill #87 (Sr.) DE; Weber, Scott (Jr.) DT; Welniak, Doug (So.) LB; Welter, Tom #69 (So.) OT; Whyrick, Doug (So.) C Wingard, Dan #47 (Jr.) PK; Yates, Rod #91 (Sr.) SE; Yost, Scott (So.) SE; Zierke, Mike #78 (Sr.) DT

=== Depth chart ===
Defense

FS
Bret Clark
Chris Carr
Todd Fisher

INSDIE	INSDIE
Marc Munford	Mark Daum
Chad Daffer	Kevin Parsons
Steve Forch	Todd Proffitt

MONSTER BACK
Mike Mccashland
Charlie Cartwright
Brian Washington

CB
Dave Burke
Mike Carl
Ricky Greene

DE	DT	NT	DT	DE
Scott Strasburger	Rob Stuckey	Ken Graeber	Chris Spachman	Bill Weber
Brad Smith	Jim Skow	Ken Shead	Danny Noonan	Greg Reeves
Scott Tucker	Lee Jones	John Reinhardt	Mike Zierke	Brad Tyrer

CB
Dennis Watkins
Neil Harris
Brian Pokorny

Offense

SE
Scott Kimball
Jason Gamble
Robb Schnitzler

LT	LG	C	RG	RT
Mark Behning	Harry Grimminger	Mark Traynowicz	Greg Orton	Tom Morrow
Tim Roth	Anthony Thomas	Bill Lewis	Stan Parker	Tom Welter
Todd Carpenter	John McCormick	Mark Cooper	Mike Hoefler	Rob Maggard

TE
Brian Hiemre
Todd Frain
Don Bourn

WB
Shane Swanson
Jim Thompson
Pernell Gatson

QB
Craig Sundberg
Travis Turner
Clete Blakeman
⋅

RB
Doug Dubose
Jeff Smith
Keith Jones
Paul Miles

FB
Tom Rathman
Scott Porter
Ken Kaelin

Special teams
PK Dale Klein
P Scott Livingston

== Coaching staff ==
Name	Title	First year in this position	Years at Nebraska	Alma mater
Tom Osborne	Head coach Offensive coordinator	1973	1964–1997	Hastings College
Charlie McBride	Defensive coordinator	1981	1977–1999	Colorado
Cletus Fischer	Offensive Line		1960–1985	Nebraska
John Melton	Linebackers	1973	1962–1988	Wyoming
Boyd Epley	Head Strength Coach	1969	1969–2003	Nebraska
George Darlington	Defensive Ends		1973–2002	Rutgers
Milt Tenopir	Offensive Line	1974	1974–2002	Sterling
Gene Huey	Receivers	1977	1977–1986	Wyoming
Frank Solich	Running Backs	1983	1979–2003	Nebraska
Jack Pierce			1979–1991	
Bob Thornton	Secondary	1981	1981–1985	Nebraska
Dan Young	Offensive Line; Kicking	1983	1983–2002	Reed College

== Game summaries ==
=== Wyoming ===
Wyoming at #2 Nebraska [box score]

Team	1	2	3	4	Total
Wyoming	0	7	0	0	7
• #2 Nebraska	0	14	21	7	42

- Date: 1984-09-08
- Location: Memorial Stadium, Lincoln, Nebraska
- Game attendance: 76,125

Nebraska was forced to put extra effort in for the win after losing three of four first-half fumbles and giving up an interception, as Wyoming won the turnover battle 4–1.

=== Minnesota ===
Minnesota at #1 Nebraska [box score]

Team	1	2	3	4	Total
Minnesota	0	0	0	7	7
• #1 Nebraska	0	21	10	7	38

- Date: 1984-09-15
- Location: Memorial Stadium, Lincoln, Nebraska
- Game attendance: 76,077

'Fumble-itis' continued to plague Nebraska, after the ball was put on the ground eight times, half of them lost to Minnesota. Still, the newly minted #1 Cornhuskers easily put away the turnover-free Golden Gophers with the help of 405 yards on the ground.

=== UCLA ===
#1 Nebraska at #8 UCLA [box score]

Team	1	2	3	4	Total
• #1 Nebraska	6	15	7	14	42
#8 UCLA	0	0	3	0	3

- Date: 1984-09-22
- Location: Rose Bowl, Pasadena, California
- Game start: 12:30 p.m. PDT
- Game attendance: 71,355
- Referee: Jim Sprenger
- TV announcers (CBS): Gary Bender and Pat Haden

Nebraska dominated UCLA in the new Rose Bowl home of the Bruins, handing them their worst loss in 14 years. The Cornhuskers recorded eight sacks while running up 42 points, while the offensive output of the Bruins netted only a 3rd quarter field goal.

=== Syracuse ===
#1 Nebraska at Syracuse [box score]

Team	1	2	3	4	Total
#1 Nebraska	7	0	0	2	9
• Syracuse	0	3	7	7	17

- Date: 1984-09-29
- Location: Carrier Dome, Syracuse, New York
- Game start: 12:30 p.m. EDT
- Game attendance: 47,280
- Referee: Raymond Bower
- TV announcers (KATZ): Curt Gowdy and Len Dawson

Unranked Syracuse, coming off a 0–19 shutout loss against Rutgers at home the week prior, severely embarrassed the #1 Cornhuskers, who may have been guilty of overlooking the team they had defeated 63–7 the year before. Nebraska's regular season winning streak was ended at 23. Coach Osborne stated it simply; "They were more physical today".

=== Oklahoma State ===
#9 Oklahoma State at #8 Nebraska [box score]

Team	1	2	3	4	Total
#9 Oklahoma State	3	0	0	0	3
• #8 Nebraska	0	0	0	17	17

- Date: 1984-10-06
- Location: Memorial Stadium, Lincoln, Nebraska
- Game start: 2:30 p.m. CDT
- Game attendance: 76,368
- Referee: John McClintock
- TV announcers (ABC): Keith Jackson and Frank Broyles

It was another season of disappointment for Oklahoma State's record against Nebraska. The Cowboys came to Lincoln with a better record than the Cornhuskers for the first time ever, with high hopes after Nebraska fell to Syracuse the week before, and OSU indeed led the game for three quarters. A 4th quarter, 49 yard punt return by Shane Swanson swung the momentum to Nebraska, and Oklahoma State's 22-year-long drought against Nebraska was extended yet another year.

=== Missouri ===
Missouri at #6 Nebraska [box score]

Team	1	2	3	4	Total
Missouri	7	3	0	13	23
• #6 Nebraska	7	9	10	7	33

- Date: 1984-10-13
- Location: Memorial Stadium, Lincoln, Nebraska
- Game attendance: 76,319

Missouri fought a hard battle and barely won the time of possession battle, at one point drawing within 6 points, but a 57-yard interception return for a touchdown opened the game up a bit as Nebraska gained enough room to finish the game ahead by 10.

=== Colorado ===
#5 Nebraska at Colorado [box score]

Team	1	2	3	4	Total
• #5 Nebraska	0	3	0	21	24
Colorado	0	7	0	0	7

- Date: 1984-10-20
- Location: Folsom Field, Boulder, Colorado
- Game attendance: 52,124

The Blackshirts carried Nebraska for three quarters as the offense sputtered and failed to produce a useful lead. Finally, in the 4th quarter, the Cornhuskers overcame their struggles and ran off 21 points for the win.

=== Kansas State ===
Kansas State at #4 Nebraska [box score]

Team	1	2	3	4	Total
Kansas State	7	0	7	0	14
• #4 Nebraska	19	29	7	7	62

- Date: 1984-10-27
- Location: Memorial Stadium, Lincoln, Nebraska
- Game attendance: 76,068

Nebraska recorded its 25th straight conference win as Kansas State rolled over and fell behind by 48–7 at the half. The lead allowed the Cornhuskers to rotate several players into the game, which resulted in no single player exceeding 100 rushing yards rushing for the first time in 20 games.

=== Iowa State ===
#3 Nebraska at Iowa State [box score]

Team	1	2	3	4	Total
• #3 Nebraska	3	7	6	28	44
Iowa State	0	0	0	0	0

- Date: 1984-11-03
- Location: Cyclone Stadium, Ames, Iowa
- Game attendance: 52,919

Nebraska held Iowa State's star receiver to two catches for 11 yards, and the Cyclones offense to just five first downs, as the Blackshirts posted their first shutout in two years. By the 4th quarter, Iowa State's own defense lost their effectiveness and could no longer keep up, as the Cornhuskers rolled up 28 more points to pull away.

=== Kansas ===
#2 Nebraska at Kansas [box score]

Team	1	2	3	4	Total
• #2 Nebraska	21	7	0	13	41
Kansas	0	0	0	7	7

- Date: 1984-11-10
- Location: Memorial Stadium, Lawrence, Kansas
- Game attendance: 50,653

The Cornhuskers held Kansas to just 12 first downs and 24 yards on the ground, clinching at least a share of the 1984 Big 8 Title.

=== Oklahoma ===
#4 Oklahoma at #1 Nebraska [box score]

Team	1	2	3	4	Total
• #4 Oklahoma	7	0	0	10	17
#1 Nebraska	0	7	0	0	7

- Date: 1984-11-17
- Location: Memorial Stadium, Lincoln, Nebraska
- Game start: 2:30 p.m. CST
- Game attendance: 76,323
- TV announcers (ABC): Keith Jackson and Frank Broyles

Four painful turnovers were enough to overcome the statistical success Nebraska achieved, as Oklahoma ended Nebraska's 27 game conference win streak and 21 game win streak in Lincoln. The run-oriented Cornhuskers out-passed the Sooners 236–58, but two key stops by the Sooners in the 2nd half put down Nebraska's hopes for a shot the National Championship.

=== LSU ===
#4 Nebraska vs #12 LSU [box score]

Team	1	2	3	4	Total
• #4 Nebraska	0	7	7	14	28
#12 LSU	3	7	0	0	10

- Date: 1985-01-01
- Location: Louisiana Superdome, New Orleans, Louisiana
- Game start: 7:35 p.m. CST
- Game attendance: 75,608
- TV announcers (ABC): Keith Jackson and Frank Broyles

Nebraska overcame a 10-point deficit to come within 3 by halftime, and after that it was all Nebraska as the Cornhuskers won the turnover game's battle 6–3 and ran off 21 more points while shutting down all further attempts by LSU to score.

== Rankings ==
Ranking movements Legend: ██ Increase in ranking ██ Decrease in ranking
	Week															
Poll	Pre	1	2	3	4	5	6	7	8	9	10	11	12	13	14	Final
AP	2	2	1	1	1	8	6	5	4	3	2	1	7	5	5	4
Coaches																3

== Awards ==
Award	Name(s)
All-America 1st team	Bret Clark, Harry Grimminger, Mark Traynowicz
All-America 2nd team	Jeff Smith
All-America 3rd team	Mark Behning
All-America honorable mention	Doug DuBose, Scott Strasburger, Bill Weber, Scott Livingston
All-Big 8 1st team	Mark Behning, Bret Clark, Doug DuBose, Harry Grimminger, Scott Livingston, Marc Munford, Greg Orton, Jeff Smith, Scott Strasburger, Mark Traynowicz, Bill Weber
All-Big 8 2nd team	David Burke, Mark Daum, Rob Stuckey
All-Big 8 honorable mention	Ken Graeber, Shane Swanson

== NFL and pro players ==
The following Nebraska players who participated in the 1984 season later moved on to the next level and joined a professional or semi-pro team as draftees or free agents.

Name	Team
Mark Behning	Pittsburgh Steelers
Brian Blankenship	Pittsburgh Steelers
Bret Clark	Tampa Bay Bandits
Doug DuBose	San Francisco 49ers
Todd Frain	Washington Redskins
Keith Jones	Cleveland Browns
Mike Knox	Denver Broncos
Bill Lewis	Los Angeles Raiders
Scott Livingston	Dallas Cowboys
Paul Miles	Tampa Bay Buccaneers
Marc Munford	Denver Broncos
Danny Noonan	Dallas Cowboys
Greg Orton	Detroit Lions
Tom Rathman	San Francisco 49ers
Tim Rother	Los Angeles Raiders
Jim Skow	Cincinnati Bengals
Jeff Smith	Kansas City Chiefs
Scott Strasburger	Dallas Cowboys
Shane Swanson	Denver Broncos
Mark Traynowicz	Buffalo Bills
Brian Washington	Cleveland Browns
Dennis Watkins	Philadelphia Eagles
Tom Welter	St. Louis Cardinals
