= 1984 Gator Bowl =

- 40th Gator Bowl
South Carolina Gamecocks	Oklahoma State Cowboys
(10–1)	(9–2)
Independent	Big Eight
14	21
Head coach: Joe Morrison	Head coach: Pat Jones
AP / Coaches; 7 / 7	AP / Coaches; 9 / 9
	1	2	3	4	Total
South Carolina	0	0	14	0	14
Oklahoma State	7	6	0	8	21
- Date: December 28, 1984
- Season: 1984
- Stadium: Gator Bowl Stadium
- Location: Jacksonville, Florida
- MVP: RB Thurman Thomas (Oklahoma State); QB Mike Hold (South Carolina)
- Referee: C.C. Dailey (ACC)
- Attendance: 82,138

United States TV coverage
- Network: ABC
- Announcers: Al Michaels and Lee Grosscup

The 1984 Gator Bowl game was a post-season college football bowl game between the #7 South Carolina Gamecocks and the #9 Oklahoma State Cowboys. It was the 40th edition of the bowl game. This was the first meeting of two top ten teams in the Gator Bowl with the 1987 Gator Bowl being the only other such occasion when #9 South Carolina lost to #7 LSU.

== Background ==
The Gamecocks had recovered from a 5–6 season in 1983 to compile a 10–1 record during the regular season, coach Joe Morrison's second at South Carolina. The Gamecocks started the season 9–0 and rose to #2 in the country after defeating #11 Florida State on November 10, 1984. However, an upset loss at Navy the following week knocked the Gamecocks from Orange Bowl consideration and whipped out the National Championship aspirations. The Gamecocks would bounce back with a come from behind 22–21 victory at Clemson to finish the regular season 10–1 and earn the Gator Bowl bid. During the season South Carolina defeated #12 Georgia and #11 Florida State at home along with road wins at Notre Dame and N.C. State. The 10 win-regular season was a first in school history and would not be equaled until 2011.

As for the Cowboys (in their first season under coach Pat Jones, who took over after spring practice when Jimmy Johnson was hired away by the Miami Hurricanes to replace Howard Schnellenberger), they started the season with a victory over #12 Arizona State that made them rise to #13 by the following week. After a 4–0 start, they lost to #8 Nebraska, but won their next five games to set up a pivotal game versus #2 Oklahoma. However, they lost 24–14, while finishing in 2nd place in the Big Eight Conference. This was their third bowl game of the decade.

== Game summary ==
First quarter

- OSU – Thurman Thomas 1-yard run (Larry Roach kick) 8:16 in 1st

Second quarter

- OSU – Rusty Hilger 6-yard pass from Thomas (kick failed) 9:39 in 2nd

Third quarter

- USC – Chris Wade 24-yard pass from Quinton Lewis (Scott Hagler kick) 7:36 in 3rd
- USC – Ira Hillary 57-yard pass from Mike Hold (Hagler kick) 2:44 in 3rd

Fourth quarter

- OSU – Barry Hanna 25-yard pass from Hilger (Jamie Harris pass from Hilger) 1:04 in 4th

On the Cowboy side, Thomas rushed 155 yards on 32 carries, while Hilger threw 21-of-41 for 205 yards and one interception and a touchdown. On the Gamecock side, Hold threw 7-of-21 for 170 yards while Quinton Lewis rushed for 26 yards on 6 carries. The Cowboys managed to outgain the Gamecocks in yards by 78, but had 3 turnovers to the Gamecocks' 1. The Cowboys had 21 first downs, 165 rushing yards, 211 passing, and 3 penalties for 21 yards, while the Gamecocks had 15 first down, 104 rushing yards, 194 passing yards, and 5 penalties for 38 yards.

== Aftermath ==
In 1985 South Carolina slipped to 5–6 and did not qualify for a bowl game. Their next bowl appearance would be back in Jacksonville for the 1987 Gator Bowl. The Gamecocks, which were still independent, would fall to SEC power LSU 30–13. Coach Morrison would eventually serve as South Carolina's coach from 1983 to 1988 compiling a record of 39–28–2 and leading the Gamecocks to three bowl appearances (also 1988 Liberty Bowl). Morrison would die of a heart attack on February 5, 1989 and be replaced by Sparky Woods.

South Carolina would be invited to join the SEC in 1990 and joined the league during the 1991–92 year with the exception of football which began conference play in 1992. The program's first bowl victory would come during the 1994 season when they defeated West Virginia in the Carquest Bowl 24–21 on January 2, 1995.

As for the Cowboys, they made the Gator Bowl in 1985, though they lost 23–34 to Florida State and finished 8–4. Coach Jones would remain at Oklahoma State for 11 seasons (1984–94) and compiled a record of 62–60–3. During his tenure the Cowboys played in four bowl games, winning three (1987 Sun Bowl and 1988 Holiday Bowl). During his first five seasons in Stillwater, Jones compiled a record of 44–15 with three bowl wins in four appearances and the school's first three ten-win seasons. Those Cowboy squads were led by future NFL stars Leslie O'Neal, Thurman Thomas and 1988 Heisman Trophy winner Barry Sanders.

However, Oklahoma State was decimated in early 1989 when the program was placed on probation for four years by the NCAA for numerous major rules violations; the Cowboys were banned from bowl games for three seasons and television appearances for two. Jones' last six seasons resulted in no winning seasons and a record of 18–45–3. Oklahoma State's collapse coincided with the rise of Colorado to a national powerhouse under Bill McCartney and Kansas State shedding its status as perennial conference doormat and becoming a consistent winner under Bill Snyder.

Jones' 62 wins is second in school history behind current coach Mike Gundy, the Cowboys' starting quarterback from 1986-89.
