= 1984 Missouri Tigers football team =

American college football season

1984 Missouri Tigers football
- Conference: Big Eight Conference
- Record: 3–7–1 (2–4–1 Big 8)
- Head coach: Warren Powers (7th season)
- Offensive coordinator: Larry Beightol (2nd season)
- Defensive coordinator: Mark Heydorff (2nd season)
- Home stadium: Faurot Field

1984 Big Eight Conference football standings
	Conf.					Overall
Team	W		L		T	W		L		T
No. 4 Nebraska +	6	–	1	–	0	10	–	2	–	0
No. 6 Oklahoma +	6	–	1	–	0	9	–	2	–	1
No. 7 Oklahoma State	5	–	2	–	0	10	–	2	–	0
Kansas	4	–	3	–	0	5	–	6	–	0
Missouri	2	–	4	–	1	3	–	7	–	1
Kansas State	2	–	4	–	1	3	–	7	–	1
Colorado	1	–	6	–	0	1	–	10	–	0
Iowa State	0	–	5	–	2	2	–	7	–	2
+ – Conference co-champions; Rankings from AP Poll

The 1984 Missouri Tigers football team was an American football team that represented the University of Missouri in the Big Eight Conference (Big 8) during the 1984 NCAA Division I-A football season. The team compiled a 3–7–1 record (2–4–1 against Big 8 opponents), finished in a tie for fifth place in the Big 8, and outscored its opponents by a combined total of 310 to 301. Warren Powers was the head coach for the seventh of seven seasons. The team played its home games at Faurot Field in Columbia, Missouri.

The team's statistical leaders included Jon Redd with 668 rushing yards, Marlon Adler with 1,128 passing yards, and George Shorthose with 601 receiving yards.

== Schedule ==
Date	Opponent	Site	Result	Attendance	Source
September 8	at Illinois*	Memorial Stadium; Champaign, IL (rivalry)	L 24–30	78,297	
September 15	Wisconsin*	Faurot Field; Columbia, MO	L 34–35	45,033	
September 22	Mississippi State*	Faurot Field; Columbia, MO	W 47–30	42,967	
September 29	No. 19 Notre Dame*	Faurot Field; Columbia, MO	L 14–16	70,915	
October 6	Colorado	Faurot Field; Columbia, MO	W 52–7	38,662	
October 13	at No. 6 Nebraska	Memorial Stadium; Lincoln, NE (rivalry)	L 23–33	76,319	
October 20	at Kansas State	KSU Stadium; Manhattan, KS	W 61–21	22,200	
October 27	Iowa State	Faurot Field; Columbia, MO (rivalry)	T 14–14	48,133	
November 3	at No. 10 Oklahoma	Oklahoma Memorial Stadium; Norman, OK (rivalry)	L 7–49	75,357	
November 10	at No. 7 Oklahoma State	Lewis Field; Stillwater, OK	L 13–31	48,200	
November 17	Kansas	Faurot Field; Columbia, MO (Border War)	L 21–35	41,027	
*Non-conference game; Rankings from AP Poll released prior to the game
