= 1985 Orange Bowl =

- 51st Orange Bowl
- The Miami Orange Bowl in Miami, Florida, hosted the Orange Bowl.
Washington Huskies	Oklahoma Sooners
(10–1)	(9–1–1)
Pac-10	Big Eight
28	17
Head coach: Don James	Head coach: Barry Switzer
AP / Coaches; 4 / 3	AP / Coaches; 2 / 2
	1	2	3	4	Total
Washington	14	0	0	14	28
Oklahoma	0	14	0	3	17
- Date: January 1, 1985
- Season: 1984
- Stadium: Orange Bowl
- Location: Miami, Florida
- MVP: Jacque Robinson (UW TB); Ron Holmes (UW DT)
- Favorite: Oklahoma by 6 points
- Referee: Jimmy Harper (SEC)
- Attendance: 56,294

United States TV coverage
- Network: NBC
- Announcers: Don Criqui, Bob Trumpy, and Bill Macatee
- Nielsen ratings: 16.9

The 1985 Orange Bowl was the 51st edition of the college football bowl game, played at the Orange Bowl in Miami, Florida, on Tuesday, January 1. Part of the 1984–85 bowl game season, it matched the fourth-ranked Washington Huskies of the Pacific-10 Conference and the #2 Oklahoma Sooners of the Big Eight Conference. Underdog Washington rallied to win 28–17.

== Teams ==
Orange Bowl organizers envisioned the game as a national championship game, discounting the undefeated record of BYU due to their perceived inferior schedule.

Brigham Young's opponents as a group have a losing record; how can a team like that be the national champion? As far as the Orange Bowl is concerned, we think ours is a national championship game.

— Nick Crane, Orange Bowl team selection committee chairman

=== Washington ===
The Huskies (10–1) had risen back from a loss at USC on November 10 that knocked them from the top spot in both polls to fourth (#3 UPI), and cost them the Pac-10 title and the accompanying berth in the Rose Bowl. This was the first appearance by a Pac-10 team in the Orange Bowl and remains the Huskies' only appearance.

=== Oklahoma ===
The Sooners (9–1–1) tied rival Texas but were upset at Kansas. They won the Big Eight title for the ninth time in twelve seasons and were making their fifth Orange Bowl appearance in eight seasons; they were favored in this game by six points.

== Game summary ==
Danny Greene gave the Huskies an early lead on his 29-yard touchdown catch from quarterback Paul Sicuro, and tailback Jacque Robinson made it 14–0 after one quarter on his touchdown plunge. Sooner quarterback Danny Bradley cut the lead with a touchdown sneak, and Derrick Shepard tied the game before halftime on his 61-yard catch from Bradley for a touchdown.

The third quarter was scoreless, and Tim Lashar's 35-yard field goal gave Oklahoma a 17–14 lead with under nine minutes remaining. After Sicuro was intercepted for a third time, Hugh Millen took over at quarterback for Washington in the fourth quarter. He guided the Huskies on a 74-yard drive in seven plays, capped by a twelve-yard pass to Mark Pattison in the end zone for a four-point lead with less than six minutes to go. The Sooners muffed the ensuing kickoff return and started at their own two; Washington intercepted a tipped Bradley pass deep in Oklahoma territory and soon scored again on a touchdown run by fullback Rick Fenney to make the final score 28–17.

=== The Sooner Schooner ===
With the score tied early in the fourth quarter, Oklahoma attempted a short field goal, from 22 yards out. It was good, and the Sooner Schooner rode out onto the field, as was tradition for Sooner scores. However, the play was nullified due to an illegal procedure penalty on Oklahoma due to a player not reporting his temporary jersey number to the officials, which he was required to do before the ball was snapped.

Pulled by two Shetland ponies, the wagon got stuck on the wet grass, ending up in front of the Huskies' sideline, and the Sooners were assessed a 15-yard penalty for unsportsmanlike conduct. Lashar's ensuing 42-yard kick was blocked, keeping the game tied at fourteen.

The Orange Bowl had returned to natural grass nine years earlier in 1976; the Sooners' home field in Norman had artificial turf from 1970 through 1993.

=== Scoring ===
First quarter

- Washington – Danny Greene 29-yard pass from Paul Sicuro (Jeff Jaeger kick)
- Washington – Jacque Robinson 1-yard run (Jaeger kick)

Second quarter

- Oklahoma – Danny Bradley 1-yard run (Tim Lashar kick)
- Oklahoma – Derrick Shepard 61-yard pass from Bradley (Lashar kick)

Third quarter
No scoring
Fourth quarter

- Oklahoma – Lashar 35-yard field goal
- Washington – Mark Pattison 12-yard pass from Hugh Millen (Jaeger kick)
- Washington – Rick Fenney 6-yard run (Jaeger kick)

== Statistics ==
Statistics	Washington	Oklahoma
First downs	17	17
Rushes–yards	43–192	54–162
Passing yards	119	124
Passes (C–A–I)	9–21–3	6–21–1
Total offense	64–311	75–286
Punts–average	6–37.7	7–34.6
Fumbles–lost	3–1	6–2
Turnovers	4	3
Penalties–yards	5–25	8–60
Time of possession	28:52	31:04

== Aftermath ==
Washington finished second in both final polls; undefeated Brigham Young won the national title after they rallied for a 24–17 victory over unranked Michigan (6–6) in the Holiday Bowl on December 21. Oklahoma fell to sixth.

This remains Washington's sole Orange Bowl appearance; Oklahoma returned in each of the next three seasons. The next Pac-10 team at the Orange Bowl was eighteen years later, the USC Trojans in January 2003.
