= 1984 Kansas State Wildcats football team =

American college football season

1984 Kansas State Wildcats football
- Conference: Big Eight Conference
- Record: 3–7–1 (2–4–1 Big 8)
- Head coach: Jim Dickey (7th season)
- Home stadium: KSU Stadium

1984 Big Eight Conference football standings
	Conf.					Overall
Team	W		L		T	W		L		T
No. 4 Nebraska +	6	–	1	–	0	10	–	2	–	0
No. 6 Oklahoma +	6	–	1	–	0	9	–	2	–	1
No. 7 Oklahoma State	5	–	2	–	0	10	–	2	–	0
Kansas	4	–	3	–	0	5	–	6	–	0
Missouri	2	–	4	–	1	3	–	7	–	1
Kansas State	2	–	4	–	1	3	–	7	–	1
Colorado	1	–	6	–	0	1	–	10	–	0
Iowa State	0	–	5	–	2	2	–	7	–	2
+ – Conference co-champions; Rankings from AP Poll

The 1984 Kansas State Wildcats football team represented Kansas State University in the 1984 NCAA Division I-A football season. The team's head football coach was Jim Dickey. The Wildcats played their home games in KSU Stadium. 1984 saw the Wildcats finish with a record of 3–7–1, and a 2–4–1 record in Big Eight Conference play.

== Schedule ==
Date	Opponent	Site	Result	Attendance	Source
September 8	at Vanderbilt*	Vanderbilt Stadium; Nashville, TN	L 14–26	40,786	
September 15	Tennessee Tech*	KSU Stadium; Manhattan, KS	W 28–12	32,200	
September 22	at TCU*	Amon G. Carter Stadium; Fort Worth, TX	L 10–42	28,412	
September 29	at No. 7 Oklahoma	Oklahoma Memorial Stadium; Norman, OK	L 6–24	72,017	
October 6	at South Carolina*	Williams–Brice Stadium; Columbia, SC	L 17–49	67,200	
October 13	Kansas	KSU Stadium; Manhattan, KS (rivalry)	W 24–7	42,250	
October 20	Missouri^{†}	KSU Stadium; Manhattan, KS	L 21–61	22,200	
October 27	at No. 4 Nebraska	Memorial Stadium; Lincoln, NE (rivalry)	L 14–62	76,068	
November 3	No. 7 Oklahoma State	KSU Stadium; Manhattan, KS	L 6–34	26,300	
November 10	at Iowa State	Cyclone Stadium; Ames, IA (rivalry)	T 7–7	45,000	
November 17	Colorado	KSU Stadium; Manhattan, KS (rivalry)	W 38–6	17,600	
*Non-conference game; ^{†}Homecoming; Rankings from AP Poll released prior to the game
