= Rodney Jones =

Rodney Jones may refer to:

- Rodney Jones (poet) (born 1950), American poet and professor of English
- Rodney Jones (guitarist) (born 1956), American jazz guitarist
- Rodney Jones (boxer) (born 1968), American boxer
- Rodney "Lil Rod" Jones, a former record producer of Sean Combs

== See also ==
- Rod Jones (disambiguation)
