= 1984 Iowa State Cyclones football team =

American college football season

1984 Iowa State Cyclones football
- Conference: Big Eight Conference
- Record: 2–7–2 (0–5–2 Big 8)
- Head coach: Jim Criner (2nd season)
- Defensive coordinator: Ed Johnson (1st season)
- Home stadium: Cyclone Stadium

1984 Big Eight Conference football standings
	Conf.					Overall
Team	W		L		T	W		L		T
No. 4 Nebraska +	6	–	1	–	0	10	–	2	–	0
No. 6 Oklahoma +	6	–	1	–	0	9	–	2	–	1
No. 7 Oklahoma State	5	–	2	–	0	10	–	2	–	0
Kansas	4	–	3	–	0	5	–	6	–	0
Missouri	2	–	4	–	1	3	–	7	–	1
Kansas State	2	–	4	–	1	3	–	7	–	1
Colorado	1	–	6	–	0	1	–	10	–	0
Iowa State	0	–	5	–	2	2	–	7	–	2
+ – Conference co-champions; Rankings from AP Poll

The 1984 Iowa State Cyclones football team represented Iowa State University as a member of the Big Eight Conference during the 1984 NCAA Division I-A football season. Led by second-year head coach Jim Criner, the Cyclones compiled an overall record of 2–7–2 with a mark of 0–5–2 in conference play, placing last in the Big 8. Iowa State played home games at Cyclone Stadium in Ames, Iowa.

== Schedule ==
Date	Time	Opponent	Site	TV	Result	Attendance	Source
September 8	12:10 pm	at No. 10 Iowa*	Kinnick Stadium; Iowa City, IA (rivalry)	Sports View	L 21–59	66,150	
September 15	1:30 pm	Drake*	Cyclone Stadium; Ames, IA		W 21–17	47,656	
September 22	11:34 am	at Texas A&M*	Kyle Field; College Station, TX	Raycom	L 17–38	45,239	
September 29	1:30 pm	West Texas State*	Cyclone Stadium; Ames, IA		W 14–0	50,316	
October 6	1:30 pm	at Kansas	Memorial Stadium; Lawrence, KS		L 14–33	31,500	
October 13	2:30 pm	at Colorado	Folsom Field; Boulder, CO		L 21–23	36,762	
October 20	6:45 p.m.	No. 2 Oklahoma^{†}	Cyclone Stadium; Ames, IA	ESPN	L 10–12	50,977	
October 27	1:30 pm	at Missouri	Faurot Field; Columbia, MO (rivalry)		T 14–14	48,133	
November 3	1:30 pm	No. 3 Nebraska	Cyclone Stadium; Ames, IA (rivalry)		L 0–44	52,919	
November 10	11:34 am	Kansas State	Cyclone Stadium; Ames, IA (rivalry)	Katz Sports Network	T 7–7	45,000	
November 17	11:34 am	at No. 4 Oklahoma State	Lewis Field; Stillwater, OK	Katz Sports Network	L 10–16	32,000	
*Non-conference game; ^{†}Homecoming; Rankings from AP Poll released prior to the game; All times are in Central time

== Game summaries ==
=== At Iowa ===
Iowa State at #10 Iowa

Team	1	2	3	4	Total
Cyclones	0	7	0	14	21
• Hawkeyes	14	28	10	7	59

- Date: September 8
- Location: Kinnick Stadium, Iowa City, Iowa
- Game start: 12:05 p.m. EDT
- Elapsed time: 3:30
- Game attendance: 66,150
- Game weather: 78 °F (26 °C), Showers possible, Wind SW 10–20 mph (16–32 km/h)
- Referee: Tom Quinn
- Television network: IPTV

Scoring summary
Q1		IOWA	Strobel 38-yard interception return (Nichol kick)	IOWA 7–0
Q1		IOWA	Happel 15-yard pass from Long (Nichol kick)	IOWA 14–0
Q2		IOWA	Smith 63-yard pass from Long (Nichol kick)	IOWA 21–0
Q2		IOWA	Hayes 3-yard pass from Long (Nichol kick)	IOWA 28–0
Q2		IOWA	O. Gill 3-yard run (Nichol kick)	IOWA 35–0
Q2		ISU	Davis 1-yard pass from Espinoza (Bochrodt kick)	IOWA 35–7
Q2		IOWA	R. Harmon 86-yard run (Nichol kick)	IOWA 42–7
Q3		IOWA	R. Harmon 68-yard pass from Long (Nichol kick)	IOWA 49–7
Q3		IOWA	T. Nichol 37-yard field goal	IOWA 52–7
Q4		ISU	Henderson 45-yard pass from Espinoza (Bochrodt kick)	IOWA 52–14
Q4	6:55	IOWA	Cotton 18-yard pass from K. Hatinon (Nichol kick)	IOWA 59–14
Q4		ISU	Hanson 12-yard pass from Espinoza (Bochrodt kick)	IOWA 59–21

=== Oklahoma ===
#2 Oklahoma at Iowa State

Team	1	2	3	4	Total
• Sooners	3	0	0	9	12
Cyclones	0	7	0	3	10

- Date: October 20
- Location: Cyclone Stadium
- Game attendance: 48,509
- Television network: ESPN

=== Nebraska ===
#3 Nebraska at Iowa State

Team	1	2	3	4	Total
• Cornhuskers	3	7	6	28	44
Cyclones	0	0	0	0	0

- Date: November 3
- Location: Cyclone Stadium, Ames, Iowa
- Game attendance: 52,919

== Personnel ==
1984 Iowa State Cyclones football team roster
Players			Coaches
Offense: Pos. / # / Name / Class; QB / 11 / Alex Espinoza / So	Defense: Pos. / # / Name / Class	Special teams: Pos. / # / Name / Class	Head coach: Jim Criner; Coordinators/assistant coaches Legend: (C) Team captain; (S) Suspended; (I) Ineligible; Injured; Redshirt
