= Hugh Millen =

American football player (born 1963)

No. 12, 7, 17
- Position: Quarterback

Personal information
- Born: November 22, 1963 (age 62); Des Moines, Iowa, U.S.
- Listed height: 6 ft 5 in (1.96 m)
- Listed weight: 216 lb (98 kg)

Career information
- High school: Roosevelt (Seattle, Washington)
- College: Washington
- NFL draft: 1986: 3rd round, 71st overall pick

Career history
- Los Angeles Rams (1986–1987); Atlanta Falcons (1988–1990); New England Patriots (1991–1992); Dallas Cowboys (1993); Miami Dolphins (1993); Denver Broncos (1994–1995); New Orleans Saints (1996)*
- * Offseason or practice squad member only

Awards and highlights
- NFF Scholar-Athlete Award (1985)

Career NFL statistics
- Passing attempts: 928
- Passing completions: 560
- Completion percentage: 60.3%
- TD–INT: 22–35
- Passing yards: 6,440
- Passer rating: 73.5
- Stats at Pro Football Reference

Hugh Breedlove Millen (born November 22, 1963) is an American former professional football player who was a quarterback in the National Football League (NFL) for the Los Angeles Rams, Atlanta Falcons, New England Patriots, Dallas Cowboys and Denver Broncos. He played college football for the Washington Huskies.

== Early life ==
Born in Iowa, Millen grew up in Seattle and graduated from its Roosevelt High School in 1982. He attended Santa Rosa Junior College in northern California, finishing with 1,217 passing yards and 8 touchdowns. He transferred to the University of Washington after his sophomore season to play under head coach Don James. Coming in as a walk-on, Millen beat out freshman Chris Chandler for the starting job, who later became the starting quarterback and went on to have a successful NFL career.

As a junior in 1984, Millen registered 1,051 passing yards, five touchdowns, nine interceptions, and led the Huskies to a win over Oklahoma in the Orange Bowl, known as the infamous "Sooner Schooner" game. The win propelled Washington (11–1) to the #2 national ranking, behind unbeaten Brigham Young. As a senior in 1985, he posted 1,565 passing yards, six touchdowns and fourteen interceptions. Millen started 17 of the 20 games he appeared in for the Huskies, throwing for 2,657 yards, eleven touchdowns, and 23 interceptions.

== Professional career ==
=== Los Angeles Rams ===
Millen was selected by the Los Angeles Rams in the third round (71st overall) of the 1986 NFL draft. He missed his entire rookie season after fracturing an ankle and landing on the injured reserve list. Millen missed most of the 1987 season with a back injury and only had one pass attempt. By this time, Jim Everett – who the Rams had traded for with the Houston Oilers after being the #3 overall pick in the 1986 NFL Draft – had become entrenched as the Rams starter, and Millen would soon be heading out the door.

=== Atlanta Falcons ===
On August 30, 1988, the Atlanta Falcons picked him up off waivers and ended up playing in three games, while throwing for 215 yards. The following season, he played in five games – with one start – and completed 62% of his passes for 432 yards. In 1990, he started two games for the Falcons – winning both – completing 54% of his throws for 427 yards.

=== New England Patriots ===
On April 1, 1991, he signed with the New England Patriots in Plan B free agency. In the fourth week, Millen replaced Tommy Hodson as the starting quarterback and finished with a 5–7 record, raising the team's overall record for the season to 6–10; which was an improvement from their 1–15 record from the previous year.

Millen threw for 3,073 yards with 9 touchdown passes and 18 interceptions. It marked only the fifth time in team history that a quarterback had thrown for 3,000 yards in a season. Millen had several notable performances, beginning with his first start against the Houston Oilers where he led the Patriots to a 24–20 upset win by completing 22 of 33 passes for 244 yards and a 34-yard game-winning touchdown strike to Greg McMurtry with 34 seconds left in the game. He had his first career 300-yard passing performance against the Minnesota Vikings on October 22 – when he was 22 out of 32 for 326 yards and a touchdown pass.

He was named player of the game two consecutive weeks in November when he completed 20 out of 26 passes for 257 yards and a touchdown pass against the Miami Dolphins, then completed 30 passes for 372 yards and a touchdown throw the following week against the New York Jets. The next week, he scored his first rushing touchdown, with a one-yard sneak in a 16–13 win against the Buffalo Bills. Then on December 8 – he completed 21 of 40 passes for 330 yards for two touchdowns, including a 45-yard game winning strike to wide receiver Michael Timpson in overtime against the Indianapolis Colts.

During the 1992 season, Millen shared quarterback duties with three others; Tommy Hodson, Scott Zolak, and Jeff Carlson. He led all Patriot quarterbacks with 1,203 passing yards and 8 touchdown passes, but New England's final record was a poor 2–14. Millen suffered a third degree separated shoulder on the seventh play of the season, but still managed to play in 7 games with the persistent injury.

The Patriots 2–14 record led to a complete overhaul of the team and franchise in 1993. On April 26, he was traded to the Dallas Cowboys in exchange for a seventh round draft choice (#222-Marty Moore). With the #1 overall pick in the 1993 NFL draft, the Patriots selected Washington State quarterback Drew Bledsoe.

=== Dallas Cowboys ===
In 1993, the Dallas Cowboys were the defending Super Bowl champions and acquired Millen as insurance for injured starter Troy Aikman, who had just undergone surgery for a herniated disk. Steve Beuerlein – the backup quarterback from the previous year – had signed with the Phoenix Cardinals as a free agent. Aikman was expected to miss six to 12 weeks at the time, as he rehabbed from his surgery, while Millen and Jason Garrett would fill the void in the meantime. Millen himself had separated his left shoulder three times during the previous season.

As it turned out, Millen never did attempt a pass in the regular season, as Aikman healed well from his injury and Garrett passed him on the depth chart for the backup position. On November 10, the Cowboys signed quarterback Bernie Kosar after he had been released by the Cleveland Browns midway during the season and Millen was cut to make room for him.

=== Miami Dolphins ===
On November 15, 1993, Millen signed with the Miami Dolphins for depth purposes after Dan Marino was lost for the year with an Achilles injury and Scott Mitchell dislocated his left elbow. He did not appear in any game.

=== Denver Broncos ===
Millen spent his final two years in the NFL as a backup to John Elway in Denver during 1994 and 1995. He played in eight games for the Broncos, starting twice, and threw for 1,090 yards with three touchdown passes and a 63% completion percentage.

=== New Orleans Saints ===
On April 22, 1996, Millen was signed as a free agent by the New Orleans Saints, but was released on August 23.

== Personal life ==
Millen currently works as a football analyst for KJR-AM radio and KCPQ television in Seattle, and lives with his family in Snoqualmie. Additionally, he has helped Baden and Adidas develop a better football.

His son, Cale, also a quarterback, played at Mount Si High School in Snoqualmie, Washington and was recruited by several colleges. He chose the University of Oregon, entering as a freshman in 2019. Cale announced his transfer to the University of Connecticut on December 15, 2021. When Cale graduated from Mount Si, Hugh's next son, Clay, took over the quarterback position. Clay played at the University of Florida after transferring from Colorado State University.
