= 1984 Colorado Buffaloes football team =

American college football season

1984 Colorado Buffaloes football
- Conference: Big Eight Conference
- Record: 1–10 (1–6 Big 8)
- Head coach: Bill McCartney (3rd season)
- Offensive coordinator: Gerry DiNardo (1st season)
- Offensive scheme: Single set back, split-back
- Defensive coordinator: Lou Tepper (2nd season)
- Base defense: 3–4
- MVP: George Smith
- Captains: Lee Rouson; George Smith
- Home stadium: Folsom Field

1984 Big Eight Conference football standings
	Conf.					Overall
Team	W		L		T	W		L		T
No. 4 Nebraska +	6	–	1	–	0	10	–	2	–	0
No. 6 Oklahoma +	6	–	1	–	0	9	–	2	–	1
No. 7 Oklahoma State	5	–	2	–	0	10	–	2	–	0
Kansas	4	–	3	–	0	5	–	6	–	0
Missouri	2	–	4	–	1	3	–	7	–	1
Kansas State	2	–	4	–	1	3	–	7	–	1
Colorado	1	–	6	–	0	1	–	10	–	0
Iowa State	0	–	5	–	2	2	–	7	–	2
+ – Conference co-champions; Rankings from AP Poll

The 1984 Colorado Buffaloes football team represented the University of Colorado in the Big Eight Conference during the 1984 NCAA Division I-A football season. Led by third-year head coach Bill McCartney, the Buffaloes finished at 1–10 (1–6 in Big 8, seventh), their sixth consecutive losing season. Home games were played on campus at sixty-year-old Folsom Field in Boulder, Colorado.

The season was marked by the trauma late in the second game at Oregon on September 15, as sophomore tight end Ed Reinhardt of Littleton suffered a career-ending, life-threatening brain injury. Airlifted to Denver a month later, he was in a coma for 62 days and was partially paralyzed.

Colorado's sole win came in mid-season, by two points over last-place Iowa State on homecoming. The Buffs' previous one-win season was four years earlier; the next was in 2012.

The following spring, McCartney switched to a wishbone offense for 1985.

== Schedule ==
Date	Opponent	Site	TV	Result	Attendance	Source
September 8	Michigan State*	Folsom Field; Boulder, CO	MH Cable	L 21–24	35,825	
September 15	at Oregon*	Autzen Stadium; Eugene, OR		L 20–27	25,047	
September 22	at Notre Dame*	Notre Dame Stadium; Notre Dame, ID		L 14–55	59,075	
September 29	No. 17 UCLA*	Folsom Field; Boulder, CO		L 16–33	38,925	
October 6	at Missouri	Faurot Field; Columbia, MO	KATZ	L 7–52	38,662	
October 13	Iowa State^{†}	Folsom Field; Boulder, CO	WOI	W 23–21	36,762	
October 20	No. 5 Nebraska	Folsom Field; Boulder, CO (rivalry)		L 7–24	51,124	
October 27	at No. 10 Oklahoma State	Lewis Field; Stillwater, OK	KATZ	L 14–20	47,800	
November 3	Kansas	Folsom Field; Boulder, CO	KOOD	L 27–28	33,166	
November 10	No. 9 Oklahoma	Folsom Field; Boulder, CO	KTVY	L 17–42	38,888	
November 17	at Kansas State	KSU Stadium; Manhattan, KS (rivalry)		L 6–38	17,600	
*Non-conference game; ^{†}Homecoming; Rankings from AP Poll released prior to the game

== Roster ==
1984 Colorado Buffaloes football team roster
Players
Coaches
Offense

Pos.	#	Name	Class
WR		Loy Alexander	Jr
G		Shaun Beard	Sr
WR		Ron Brown	Jr
WR		Jo Jo Collins
OL		Eric Coyle
TE		Phil Cross
RB		Dion Dyson
TE		Jon Embree	So
WR		Drew Ferrando
OL		Jeff Glenn
C		William Gulley	Jr
OT		Tim Harper	So
RB		Mark Hatcher
G		Junior Iii	Sr
QB		Craig Keenan
QB		Derek Marshall
RB		Eric McCarty	Fr
QB		Chuck Page
TE	88	Ed Reinhardt (injured)	So
RB		Lee Rouson (C)	Sr
OT	79	Pat Ryan	So
RB		Sam Smith
QB		Steve Vogel	Sr
RB		Anthony Weatherspoon
OL		Jimmy Webb
TE		Troy Wolf

Defense

Pos.	#	Name	Class
DL		Calvin Beaty
DB		John Bennett
LB		Alan Chrite
FS		Kent Davis	Sr
LB		Don Fairbanks	Jr
DT		Curt Koch	So
LB		Miles Kusayanagi
LB		Dan McMillen	Jr
NG		Don Muncie	Sr
DB		John Nairn
DB		Lyle Pickens
SS		Mickey Pruitt	So
LB		Barry Remington	So
CB		Alvin Rubalcaba	Sr
LB		Darin Schubeck	Jr
DT		George Smith (C)	Sr
DB		Tommy Streeter
CB		Solomon Wilcots	Jr

Special teams

Pos.	#	Name	Class
P	17	Allan Braun	Sr
K		Dave DeLine
K		Larry Eckel
P		Barry Helton

Head coach

- Bill McCartney

Coordinators/assistant coaches

- Gerry DiNardo (OC)
- Lou Tepper (DC)

Legend

- (C) Team captain
- (S) Suspended
- (I) Ineligible
- Injured
- Redshirt
