= Garth Thomas =

American football player (1963–2025)

No. 69
- Position: Guard

Personal information
- Born: November 26, 1963; Bellevue, Washington, U.S.
- Died: September 10, 2025 (aged 61)
- Listed height: 6 ft 3 in (1.91 m)
- Listed weight: 260 lb (118 kg)

Career information
- High school: Redmond
- College: Washington
- NFL draft: 1987: undrafted

Career history
- Dallas Cowboys (1987)*; Seattle Seahawks (1987); Phoenix Cardinals (1988)*
- * Offseason or practice squad member only

Career NFL statistics
- Games played: 1
- Games started: 1
- Stats at Pro Football Reference

Garth C. Thomas (November 26, 1963 – September 10, 2025) was an American professional football guard who played one season with the Seattle Seahawks of the National Football League (NFL). He previously played football at Redmond High School and the University of Washington He lived in Bellevue, Washington with his wife Shelley.

Thomas died on September 10, 2025.
