= Jacque Robinson =

American football player (born 1963)

No. 28, 22
- Position: Running back

Personal information
- Born: March 5, 1963 (age 63); Oakland, California, U.S.
- Listed height: 5 ft 11 in (1.80 m)
- Listed weight: 215 lb (98 kg)

Career information
- High school: San Jose (CA)
- College: Washington
- NFL draft: 1985: 8th round, 197th overall pick

Career history
- Buffalo Bills (1985)*; Philadelphia Eagles (1987)
- * Offseason or practice squad member only

Awards and highlights
- First-team All-Pac-10 (1982); Second-team All-Pac-10 (1984)

Career NFL statistics
- Rushing yards: 114
- Rushing average: 4.8
- Touchdowns: 0
- Stats at Pro Football Reference

Jacque Cornelius Robinson (born March 5, 1963) is an American former professional football player. He played as a running back and was selected by the Buffalo Bills in the eighth round of the 1985 NFL draft. During his college career at Washington, Robinson amassed 2,300 career yards, and also earned MVP honors in both the 1982 Rose Bowl and 1985 Orange Bowl. He was the first freshman to win Player of the Game honors at the Rose Bowl and was inducted into the Rose Bowl Hall of Fame in 2019. Robinson was also the first player in history to win both Rose Rowl and Orange Bowl MVP honors. He attended San Jose High School in San Jose, California.

Robinson saw playing time in three NFL games in 1987 with the Philadelphia Eagles during the NFLPA strike. His NFL total is 114 yards on 24 carries, plus two receptions for nine yards.

He is the father of former NBA guard Nate Robinson.

== See also ==
- Washington Huskies football statistical leaders
