= Rod Jones (tight end) =

American football player (1964–2018)

No. 81, 80, 83
- Position: Tight end

Personal information
- Born: March 3, 1964; Richmond, California, U.S.
- Died: December 8, 2018 (aged 54); Seattle, Washington, U.S.
- Listed height: 6 ft 4 in (1.93 m)
- Listed weight: 240 lb (109 kg)

Career information
- High school: El Cerrito (El Cerrito, California)
- College: Washington
- NFL draft: 1987: 8th round, 223rd overall pick

Career history
- New York Giants (1987)*; Kansas City Chiefs (1987–1988); San Francisco 49ers (1989)*; Seattle Seahawks (1989); Kansas City Chiefs (1990)*
- * Offseason or practice squad member only

Awards and highlights
- First-team All-Pac-10 (1986)

Career NFL statistics
- Receptions: 8
- Receiving yards: 76
- Touchdowns: 1
- Stats at Pro Football Reference

Roderick Earl Jones (March 3, 1964 – December 8, 2018) was an American professional football player who was a tight end for three seasons with the Kansas City Chiefs and the Seattle Seahawks in the National Football League (NFL). He played college football for the Washington Huskies.

== Early life ==
Born in Richmond, California, Jones attended El Cerrito High School, a public school in nearby El Cerrito, played defensive end and tight end on the football team, and graduated in 1982.

== Career ==
Jones played college football at the University of Washington in Seattle under head coach Don James. He was part of the 1984 team that beat Oklahoma in the Orange Bowl and finished the season at 11–1, earning a national title. A team captain in his senior season of 1986, he left with the all-time receiving record for a UW tight end, with 81 receptions.

Selected by the New York Giants in the eighth round of the 1987 NFL draft, Jones played two seasons with the Kansas City Chiefs and one with the Seattle Seahawks in 1989. He then returned to the University of Washington, earning a degree in Ethnic Studies in 2000. Jones went on to spend nearly two decades within the athletic department as an academic coordinator.

== Death ==
Following a recent diagnosis of early-onset dementia at age 54, Jones shot himself in the head in his Seattle home and died several hours later at Harborview Medical Center. His family decided to donate his brain to the Boston University School of Medicine for CTE research.
