= Bob Santos (boxing trainer) =

American boxing trainer

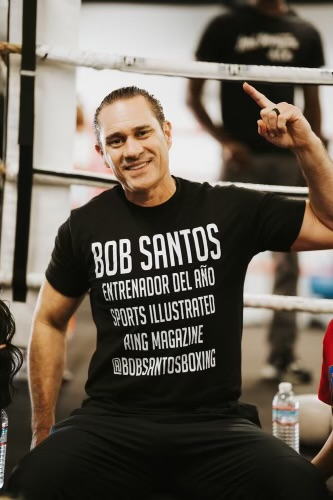
- Born: Robert Allen Santos; San Jose, California
- Known for: Boxing trainer, manager, cutman
- Relatives: Luis Molina (cousin)
- Awards: 2022 Trainer of the Year

Robert "Bob" Santos is an American boxing trainer, manager, and cutman. He was named Trainer of the Year by both The Ring and Sports Illustrated in 2022, and is a well-known member of the boxing community.

== Early life and education ==
Santos was originally from San Jose, California, where he graduated from San José High School at 17. His connection to boxing came through his family, especially through his maternal cousin, Luis Molina, who competed as a lightweight in the 1956 Summer Olympics.

== Career ==
Santos started working in construction after graduating high school, and in his early 20s became involved in coaching with featherweight titlist Héctor Lizárraga and trainers Joe Amato and Eddie Devine. Other trainers who influenced him include Joe Goossen, Emanual Steward, Ronnie Shields, Ruben Guerrero, Joe Chávez, and Chuck Bodak.

In 2022, Santos trained Dominican junior lightweight Hector Luis Garcia, who secured upset victories over Chris Colbert in February and Roger Gutierrez in August. He also guided Dominican heavy underdog Alberto Puello to the WBA junior welterweight title and Carlos Adames to an interim middleweight belt. Additionally, Santos worked with multi-division titleholder Robert "The Ghost" Guerrero and junior middleweight/middleweight veteran Erislandy Lara.

Santos has worked with notable names, including Joel Casamayor, David Morrell Jr., Mario Barrios, Rances Barthelemy, Tomoki Kameda, Livingstone Bramble, Eros Correa, and Jose Celaya. Other boxers he was involved with include top contender Luis Nunez, Cuban Olympian brothers Lenier and Dainier Pero, WBA minimum world champion Erick Rosa, and Amilcar Vidal.

Santos currently trains former world champion Jeison Rosario.

In 2025, Santos served as the head trainer for Mario Barrios during his bout against Manny Pacquiao, which was broadcast via pay-per-view on Prime Video. The fight concluded with a majority draw, allowing Barrios to retain his WBC world title.

== Awards ==
In 2022, Santos was awarded Trainer of the Year by Ring Magazine and Sports Illustrated. He was also nominated for the Boxing Writers Association of America's 2022 Trainer of the Year.

In 2024, Santos was nominated for The Ring magazine’s Trainer of the Year.
