= 1984 Kansas Jayhawks football team =

American college football season

1984 Kansas Jayhawks football
- Conference: Big Eight Conference
- Record: 5–6 (4–3 Big 8)
- Head coach: Mike Gottfried (2nd season)
- Captains: Sylvester Byrd; Willie Pless; Bennie Simecka
- Home stadium: Memorial Stadium

1984 Big Eight Conference football standings
	Conf.					Overall
Team	W		L		T	W		L		T
No. 4 Nebraska +	6	–	1	–	0	10	–	2	–	0
No. 6 Oklahoma +	6	–	1	–	0	9	–	2	–	1
No. 7 Oklahoma State	5	–	2	–	0	10	–	2	–	0
Kansas	4	–	3	–	0	5	–	6	–	0
Missouri	2	–	4	–	1	3	–	7	–	1
Kansas State	2	–	4	–	1	3	–	7	–	1
Colorado	1	–	6	–	0	1	–	10	–	0
Iowa State	0	–	5	–	2	2	–	7	–	2
+ – Conference co-champions; Rankings from AP Poll

The 1984 Kansas Jayhawks football team represented the University of Kansas in the Big Eight Conference during the 1984 NCAA Division I-A football season. In their second season under head coach Mike Gottfried, the Jayhawks compiled a 5–6 record (4–3 against conference opponents), finished in fourth place in the conference, and were outscored by opponents by a combined total of 298 to 218. They played their home games at Memorial Stadium in Lawrence, Kansas.

The Jayhawks defeated in-state opponent Wichita State 31–7 in what was the final game the two schools played before Wichita State eliminated their football program following the 1986 season.

The team's statistical leaders included Mike Norseth with 1,682 passing yards, Lynn Williams with 776 rushing yards, and Richard Estell with 500 receiving yards. Sylvester Byrd, Willie Pless, and Bennie Simecka were the team captains.

== Schedule ==
Date	Opponent	Site	Result	Attendance	Source
September 8	Wichita State*	Memorial Stadium; Lawrence, KS	W 31–7	33,200	
September 15	No. 18 Florida State*	Memorial Stadium; Lawrence, KS	L 16–42	38,600	
September 22	at Vanderbilt*	Vanderbilt Stadium; Nashville, TN	L 6–41	41,120	
September 29	at North Carolina*	Kenan Memorial Stadium; Chapel Hill, NC	L 17–23	45,000	
October 6	Iowa State	Memorial Stadium; Lawrence, KS	W 33–14	31,500	
October 13	at Kansas State	KSU Stadium; Manhattan, KS (Sunflower Showdown)	L 7–24	42,250	
October 20	at No. 12 Oklahoma State	Lewis Field; Stillwater, OK	L 10–47	44,000	
October 27	No. 2 Oklahoma^{†}	Memorial Stadium; Lawrence, KS	W 28–11	29,500	
November 3	at Colorado	Folsom Field; Boulder, CO	W 28–27	33,166	
November 10	No. 2 Nebraska	Memorial Stadium; Lawrence, KS (rivalry)	L 7–41	50,653	
November 17	at Missouri	Faurot Field; Columbia, MO (Border War)	W 35–21	41,027	
*Non-conference game; ^{†}Homecoming; Rankings from AP Poll released prior to the game
