= 1984 Oklahoma Sooners football team =

American college football season

1984 Oklahoma Sooners football

Big 8 co-champion

Orange Bowl, L 17–28 vs. Washington
- Conference: Big Eight Conference

Ranking
- Coaches: No. 6
- AP: No. 6
- Record: 9–2–1 (6–1 Big 8)
- Head coach: Barry Switzer (12th season)
- Offensive coordinator: Mack Brown (1st season)
- Offensive scheme: Wishbone
- Defensive coordinator: Gary Gibbs (4th season)
- Base defense: 5–2
- Captains: Danny Bradley; Tony Casillas; Chuck Thomas
- Home stadium: Oklahoma Memorial Stadium

1984 Big Eight Conference football standings
	Conf.					Overall
Team	W		L		T	W		L		T
No. 4 Nebraska +	6	–	1	–	0	10	–	2	–	0
No. 6 Oklahoma +	6	–	1	–	0	9	–	2	–	1
No. 7 Oklahoma State	5	–	2	–	0	10	–	2	–	0
Kansas	4	–	3	–	0	5	–	6	–	0
Missouri	2	–	4	–	1	3	–	7	–	1
Kansas State	2	–	4	–	1	3	–	7	–	1
Colorado	1	–	6	–	0	1	–	10	–	0
Iowa State	0	–	5	–	2	2	–	7	–	2
+ – Conference co-champions; Rankings from AP Poll

The 1984 Oklahoma Sooners football team represented the University of Oklahoma in the college football 1984 NCAA Division I-A season. Oklahoma Sooners football participated in the former Big Eight Conference at that time and played its home games in Gaylord Family Oklahoma Memorial Stadium where it has played its home games since 1923. The team posted a 9–2–1 overall record and a 6–1 conference record to earn a share of the Conference title under head coach Barry Switzer who took the helm in 1973. This was Switzer's ninth conference title in twelve seasons.

The team was led by All-American Tony Casillas, After winning a share of conference title, it earned a trip to the Orange Bowl for an appearance against the Washington Huskies. During the season, it faced five ranked opponents (In order, #17 Pitt, #1 Texas, #1 Nebraska, #3 Oklahoma State and #4 Washington). The last three of these opponents finished the season ranked in the top 10. It endured a tie against Texas in the Red River Shootout, a loss against a 2–5 Kansas Jayhawks team and a bowl game loss to Washington.

Lydell Carr led the team in rushing with 688 yards, Danny Bradley led the team in passing with 1095 yards, Derrick Shepard led the team in receiving with 392 yards, Placekicker Tim Lashar led the team in scoring with 68 points, Casillas had 10 quarterback sacks, freshman Brian Bosworth led the team with 133 tackles and Gary Lowell posted 4 interceptions. The defense set a school record that would only be eclipsed by the 1986 team when it allowed only 2.2 yards per rush over the course of the season.

== Schedule ==
Date	Time	Opponent	Rank	Site	TV	Result	Attendance	Source
September 8	1:30 p.m.	Stanford*	No. 16	Oklahoma Memorial Stadium; Norman, OK	USA	W 19–7	73,417	
September 15	2:30 p.m.	at No. 17 Pittsburgh*	No. 15	Pitt Stadium; Pittsburgh, PA	ABC	W 42–10	40,075	
September 22	1:30 p.m.	Baylor*	No. 11	Oklahoma Memorial Stadium; Norman, OK		W 34–15	75,018	
September 29	1:30 p.m.	Kansas State	No. 7	Oklahoma Memorial Stadium; Norman, OK		W 24–6	72,017	
October 13	2:30 p.m.	vs. No. 1 Texas*	No. 3	Cotton Bowl; Dallas, TX (Red River Shootout)	ABC	T 15–15	75,587	
October 20	6:30 p.m.	at Iowa State	No. 2	Cyclone Stadium; Ames, IA	ESPN	W 12–10	48,509	
October 27	1:30 p.m.	at Kansas	No. 2	Memorial Stadium; Lawrence, KS		L 11–28	27,460	
November 3	11:30 a.m.	Missouri	No. 10	Oklahoma Memorial Stadium; Norman, OK (rivalry)	USA	W 49–7	75,357	
November 10	2:30 p.m.	at Colorado	No. 9	Folsom Field; Boulder, CO		W 42–17	34,673	
November 17	2:30 p.m.	at No. 1 Nebraska	No. 6	Memorial Stadium; Lincoln, NE (rivalry)	ABC	W 17–7	76,323	
November 24	2:30 p.m.	No. 3 Oklahoma State	No. 2	Oklahoma Memorial Stadium; Norman, OK (Bedlam Series)	ABC	W 24–14	76,198	
January 1, 1985	7:00 p.m.	vs. No. 4 Washington*	No. 2	Miami Orange Bowl; Miami, FL (Orange Bowl)	NBC	L 17–28	56,294	
*Non-conference game; Rankings from AP Poll released prior to the game; All times are in Central time; Source:

== Personnel ==
1984 Oklahoma Sooners football team roster
Players
Coaches
Offense

Pos.	#	Name	Class
QB	18	Troy Aikman	Fr
QB		Danny Bradley
OL		Brent Burks
RB		Lydell Carr
QB		Mike Clopton
RB		Patrick Collins
OL		Dave Dillingham
TE		Keith Jackson
RB		Earl Johnson
RB		Jerome Ledbetter
OL		Jeff Pickett
OL		Eric Pope
WR		Buster Rhymes
RB		Steve Sewell
WR		Derrick Shepard
RB		Damon Stell
OL		Chuck Thomas
RB		Spencer Tillman
RB		Darrell Weddington

Defense

Pos.	#	Name	Class
LB		Brian Bosworth	Fr
DB		Sonny Brown
DL		Steve Bryan
DT		Tony Casillas
DB		Rickey Dixon
DL		Tommy Flemmons
DB		Brian Hall
DB		Andre Johnson
DL		Troy Johnson
LB		Dante Jones
LB		Paul Migliazzo
DB		Tony Rayburn
DL		Darrell Reed
DL		Richard Reed
DB		Jim Rockford
DB		Keith Stanberry
DL		Jeff Tupper

Special teams

Pos.	#	Name	Class
K		Tim Lashar

Head coach

- Barry Switzer

Coordinators/assistant coaches

- Mack Brown (OC)
- Gary Gibbs (DC)
- Merv Johnson (OL)
- Charlie Sadler (DL)
- Lucious Selmon (OLB & DE)

Legend

- (C) Team captain
- (S) Suspended
- (I) Ineligible
- Injured
- Redshirt

Roster

== Game summaries ==
=== Stanford ===
Team	1	2	3	4	Total
Stanford	7	0	0	0	7
• Oklahoma	7	6	6	0	19

- Date: September 8
- Location: Oklahoma Memorial Stadium
- Game attendance: 73,417

=== Pittsburgh ===
Team	1	2	3	4	Total
• Oklahoma	0	21	0	21	42
Pittsburgh	3	0	7	0	10

- Date: September 15
- Location: Pitt Stadium
- Game attendance: 40,075

=== Baylor ===
Team	1	2	3	4	Total
Baylor	0	7	0	8	15
• Oklahoma	7	10	17	0	34

- Date: September 22
- Location: Oklahoma Memorial Stadium
- Game attendance: 75,018

=== Kansas State ===
Team	1	2	3	4	Total
Kansas St	3	0	3	0	6
• Oklahoma	0	7	7	10	24

- Date: September 29
- Location: Oklahoma Memorial Stadium
- Game attendance: 72,017

=== Texas ===
Team	1	2	3	4	Total
Texas	7	3	0	5	15
Oklahoma	0	0	15	0	15

- Date: October 13
- Location: Cotton Bowl
- Game start: 2:50 p.m. CDT
- Game attendance: 75,587
- Game weather: Rain
- TV announcers (ABC): Keith Jackson and Frank Broyles

=== Iowa State ===
Team	1	2	3	4	Total
• Oklahoma	3	0	0	9	12
Iowa St	0	7	0	3	10

- Date: October 20
- Location: Cyclone Stadium

=== Kansas ===
Team	1	2	3	4	Total
Oklahoma	3	0	0	8	11
• Kansas	0	10	3	15	28

- Date: October 27
- Location: Memorial Stadium
- Game attendance: 27,460

=== Missouri ===
Team	1	2	3	4	Total
Missouri	0	0	0	7	7
• Oklahoma	7	21	14	7	49

- Date: November 3
- Location: Oklahoma Memorial Stadium
- Game attendance: 75,357

=== Colorado ===
Team	1	2	3	4	Total
• Oklahoma	7	21	7	7	42
Colorado	0	10	0	7	17

- Date: November 10
- Location: Folsom Field
- Game attendance: 34,673

=== Nebraska ===
#6 Oklahoma at #1 Nebraska

Team	1	2	3	4	Total
• Oklahoma	7	0	0	10	17
Nebraska	0	7	0	0	7

- Date: November 17
- Location: Memorial Stadium
- Game attendance: 76,323
- Referee: Vance Carlson
- Television network: ABC

Scoring summary
Q1	OKLA	Bradley 1 yard run (Lashar kick)	OKLA 7–0
Q2	NEB	J. Smith 1 yard run (Klein kick)	Tie 7–7
Q4	OKLA	Lashar 32 yard field goal	OKLA 10–7
Q4	OKLA	Bradley 29 yard run (Lashar kick)	OKLA 17–7

=== Oklahoma State ===
#3 Oklahoma State Cowboys (9–1) vs. #2 Oklahoma Sooners (8–1–1)

Quarter	1	2	3	4	Total
Oklahoma St	0	7	7	0	14
Oklahoma	0	7	10	7	24

at Oklahoma Memorial Stadium, Norman, Oklahoma

- Date: November 24
- Game attendance: 76,198
- TV: ABC
- Box

Game information

First quarter

- No scoring

Second quarter

- OU – Keith Jackson 6-yard pass from Danny Bradley (Tim Lashar kick). Oklahoma 7–0.
- OSU – Jamie Harris 1-yard pass from Rusty Hilger (Larry Roach kick). Tie 7–7.

Third quarter

- OSU – Malcolm Lewis 77-yard pass from Hilger (Larry Roach kick). Oklahoma St 14–7.
- OU – Spencer Tillman 3-yard run (Tim Lashar kick). Tie 14–14.
- OU – Tim Lashar 22-yard field goal. Oklahoma 17–14.

Fourth quarter

- OU – Spencer Tillman 20-yard run (Tim Lashar kick). Oklahoma 24–14.

Top passers

- OSU – Rusty Hilger – 14/26, 202 yards, 2 TD, INT
- OU – Danny Bradley – 8/16, 102 yards, TD, INT

Top rushers

- OSU – Thurman Thomas – 11 rushes, 29 yards
- OU – Spencer Tillman – 30 rushes, 102 yards, 2 TD

Top receivers

- OSU – Malcolm Lewis – 3 receptions, 94 yards, TD
- OU – Derrick Shepard – 5 receptions, 51 yards

=== Orange Bowl ===
Team	1	2	3	4	Total
• Washington	14	0	0	14	28
Oklahoma	0	14	0	3	17

- Date: January 1
- Location: Orange Bowl
- Game start: 8:20 p.m. EST
- Game attendance: 56,294
- Referee: Jimmy Harper (SEC)
- TV announcers (NBC): Don Criqui and Bob Trumpy

== Rankings ==
Ranking movements Legend: ██ Increase in ranking ██ Decrease in ranking ( ) = First-place votes
	Week															
Poll	Pre	1	2	3	4	5	6	7	8	9	10	11	12	13	14	Final
AP	16	16	15	11	7	5 (1)	3 (1)	2 (10)	2 (7)	10	9	6	2 (7)	2 (18)	2 (16)	6
Coaches Poll	11	10	12	3	4	3	2 (1)	2 (3)	3 (2)	12	9	6	3 (2)	2 (10)	2 (8)	6

== Awards and honors ==
- All-American: Tony Casillas,
- Big Eight Defensive Player of the Year: Casillas
- UPI National Lineman of the Year: Casillas
- Big Eight Offensive Player of the Year: Danny Bradley
- Big Eight Conference MVP: Danny Bradley

== Postseason ==
=== NFL draft ===
The following players were drafted into the National Football League following the season.

Round	Pick	Player	Position	NFL team
1	26	Steve Sewell	Running back	Denver Broncos
4	85	Buster Rhymes	Wide receiver	Minnesota Vikings
7	189	Danny Bradley	Running back	Los Angeles Rams
8	199	Chuck Thomas	Center	Houston Oilers
12	316	Jim Rockford	Defensive back	Tampa Bay Buccaneers
