= Mark Pattison (American football) =

American football player (born 1961)

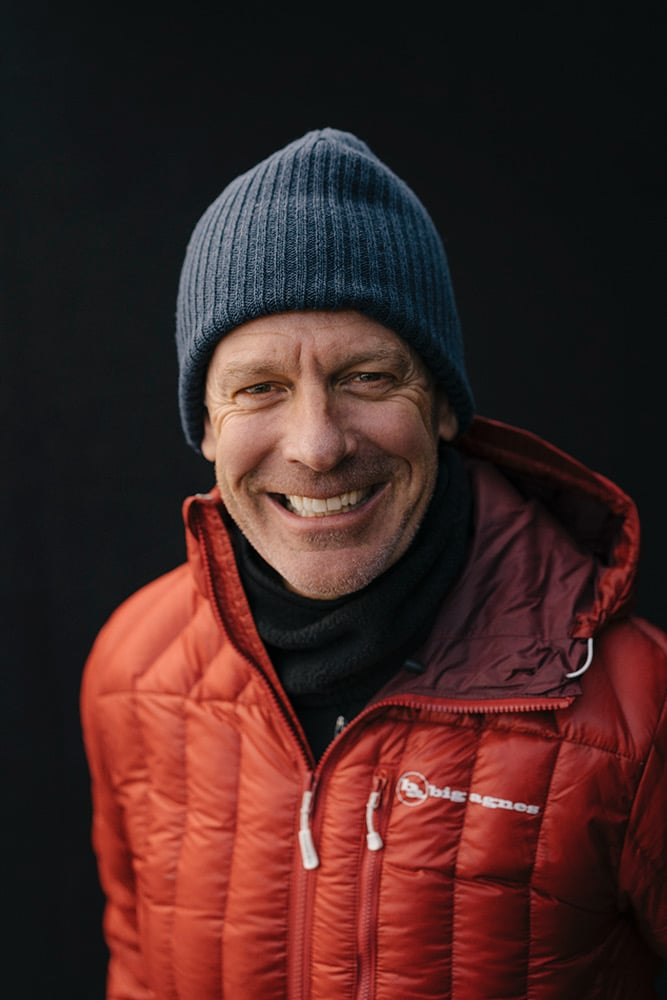

No. 83, 89, 88
- Position: Wide receiver

Personal information
- Born: December 13, 1961 (age 64); Seattle, Washington, U.S.
- Listed height: 6 ft 2 in (1.88 m)
- Listed weight: 190 lb (86 kg)

Career information
- High school: Roosevelt (Seattle)
- College: Washington
- NFL draft: 1985: 7th round, 188th overall pick

Career history
- Los Angeles Raiders (1985); Los Angeles Rams (1986); Los Angeles Raiders (1986}; New Orleans Saints (1987–1988); Seattle Seahawks (1989)*
- * Offseason or practice squad member only

Career NFL statistics
- Receptions: 12
- Receiving yards: 152
- Stats at Pro Football Reference

Mark Lester Pattison (born December 13, 1961) is an American former professional football player who was a wide receiver for four seasons in the National Football League (NFL) with the Los Angeles Raiders, Los Angeles Rams, and New Orleans Saints. He played college football for the Washington Huskies.

== Early life ==
Born and raised in Seattle, Pattison graduated from its Roosevelt High School in 1980. Playing as a wide receiver as a junior and at quarterback as a senior for the Rough Riders, he was the Player of the Year by the Seattle Post-Intelligencer.

== College career ==
Pattison was a three-year letterman at the University of Washington under head coach Don James. His senior year ended with a win in the 1985 Orange Bowl. He was selected in the seventh round of the 1985 NFL draft by the Los Angeles Raiders. In 2016, Pattison's 1984 team was inducted into the Husky Hall of Fame.

== After football ==
Following his NFL career, Pattison took up mountain climbing. In 2013, he began a goal to climb the Seven Summits, the highest points on each of the seven continents. His completed this goal by reaching the summit of Mount Everest on 23 May 2021.

He used this trek to raise awareness and funds for Epilepsy Foundation and Higher Ground.

Pattison currently is an executive for Sports Illustrated.
