= Fred Provo =

American football player (1922–1999)

No. 80
- Position: Halfback

Personal information
- Born: April 17, 1922; Seattle, Washington, U.S.
- Died: June 6, 1999 (aged 77); Bothell, Washington, U.S.
- Listed height: 5 ft 9 in (1.75 m)
- Listed weight: 185 lb (84 kg)

Career information
- High school: Vancouver (Vancouver, Washington)
- College: Washington (1941–1942, 1946–1947)
- NFL draft: 1948: 14th round, 121st overall pick

Career history
- Green Bay Packers (1948)

Career NFL statistics
- Rushing attempts: 29
- Rushing yards: 90
- Passing attempts: 1
- Pass completions: 1
- Passing yards: 20
- Punt returns: 18
- Stats at Pro Football Reference

Frederick Lewis Provo (April 17, 1922 – June 6, 1999) was an American professional football halfback who played one season in the National Football League (NFL) for the Green Bay Packers. He played college football for the Washington Huskies and was selected by the Packers in the 14th round of the 1948 NFL draft.

== Early life ==
Provo was born on April 17, 1922, in Seattle, Washington. He attended Vancouver High School; he is one of only two of their alumni to play in the NFL. At Vancouver, he was a member of their football, basketball and track and field teams. In football in 1939, he led the Southwest Washington Conference with 51 points scored in seven games, averaging over a touchdown and a conversion per game. As a senior in 1940, he was named All-Southwest Washington and was named the league's most valuable player, additionally being named the Vancouver High School and Vancouver athlete of the year. Al Stump, journalist for The Columbian, wrote in selecting Provo athlete of the year: "[he is] such an obvious choice that the name could have gone unmentioned. Weigh all the candidates – the boys and the girls who did the most in and for Vancouver sports in 1940 – and you can't name anybody else."

== College career ==
Provo was recruited by several schools to play college football and ultimately committed to the University of Washington, where he majored in advertising. He played a year with the Washington Huskies in 1942, lettering, before serving in World War II.

During the war, Provo served for the United States Army as a paratrooper. He served in the Battle of the Bulge, parachuted as part of the Normandy landings and was awarded two Purple Hearts after having been wounded in service. According to Dan McGuire, journalist for The Honolulu Advertiser: "Provo ... parachuted into Normandy on D-Day and was hit by a burst of shrapnel. He was carried to an emergency station where doctors started to operate on him. The station was wiped out by a Nazi shell. Provo was blown into a mud hole 30 yards away. His right arm was half severed. When he regained consciousness he heard someone saying: 'We'll have to take it off.' Provo screamed: 'You're not going to take it off. You're going to sew it on. That's my arm. My arm. The one I pass with. Sew it on. Sew it on–I say!' Perhaps figuring he was done for anyway, the [doctors] granted his plea."

Provo was able to recover and returned to Washington in 1946, where he played two more seasons. He was their leading passer in 1946 and was also selected to the East–West Shrine Bowl that season. A long touchdown scored by Provo helped the West upset the East in the bowl game. He was awarded the Flaherty Inspirational Award at Washington.

== Professional career ==
Provo was selected in both the 21st round (138th overall) of the 1948 AAFC Draft by the Chicago Rockets and the 14th round (121st overall) of the 1948 NFL draft by the Green Bay Packers. He opted to join the Packers, signing with them on April 10, 1948. He made the team and appeared in either 9 or 10 games for the Packers in the 1948 season. (Note: Pro-Football-Reference.com and Pro Football Archives conflict.) He totaled 28 carries for 90 yards (a 3.1 average), four receptions for negative nine yards, completed one pass attempt for 20 yards and a touchdown, and returned a total of 28 combined punts and kickoffs for 413 yards. He placed fifth in the NFL in punt returns with 18, was eighth with 208 punt return yards, was sixth with an 11.6 yard punt return average, placed sixth in combined returns and ninth overall in the league for return yardage. He retired from football following his first year due to injuries, low salary, and to help his family.

== Later life ==
Provo worked as a salesman after his football career, selling marine equipment and athletic gear. In 1973, he was inducted into the Clark County Athletic Hall of Fame and was also chosen to the all-time Vancouver football all-star squad as a first-team selection. He died in Bothell, Washington, on June 6, 1999, at the age of 77, of leukemia.
