= Rusty Hilger =

American football player (1962–2019)

No. 12
- Position: Quarterback

Personal information
- Born: May 9, 1962; Oklahoma City, Oklahoma, U.S.
- Died: December 24, 2019 (aged 57)
- Listed height: 6 ft 4 in (1.93 m)
- Listed weight: 205 lb (93 kg)

Career information
- High school: Oklahoma City (OK) Southeast
- College: Oklahoma State
- NFL draft: 1985: 6th round, 143rd overall pick

Career history
- Los Angeles Raiders (1985–1987); Detroit Lions (1988); Indianapolis Colts (1990); Seattle Seahawks (1991); Indianapolis Colts (1991); Seattle Seahawks (1992)

Awards and highlights
- Second-team All-Big Eight (1984)

Career NFL statistics
- Passing attempts: 464
- Passing completions: 204
- Completion percentage: 44.0%
- TD–INT: 11–19
- Passing yards: 2,584
- Passer rating: 52.8
- Stats at Pro Football Reference

Russell Todd Hilger (May 9, 1962 – December 24, 2019) was an American professional football player who was a quarterback in the National Football League (NFL). He played college football for the Oklahoma State Cowboys and was selected in the sixth round of the 1985 NFL draft. Hilger played for the Los Angeles Raiders, Detroit Lions, Indianapolis Colts, and Seattle Seahawks for eight seasons.

== Oklahoma State University ==
Hilger played college football at Oklahoma State University and is regarded as one of the most accomplished quarterbacks in Oklahoma State history. As a sophomore in 1981, Hilger guided the Cowboys to their first post-season bowl since 1976 against Texas A&M in the Independence Bowl. In 1982, Hilger suffered a shoulder injury before the start of the season, earning him a redshirt as the Cowboys fell to a 4–5–2 record. Returning to the starting lineup in 1983, the Cowboys finished 8–4, and Hilger was recognized as the Most Valuable Player in the 1983 Bluebonnet Bowl. In 1984, Hilger and the OSU Cowboys would change the course of Oklahoma State football. The Cowboys opened the season with a 45–3 victory over top-ranked Arizona State University, earning Hilger Big-8 "Player of the Week" honors. The Cowboys only losses came on the road against #1 ranked Nebraska and #2 ranked Oklahoma to finish with a 10–2 record, the best finish and highest ranking (#6) in school history. The Cowboy's final come-from-behind touchdown drive in the Gator Bowl against the University of South Carolina remains one of the most memorable moments in Cowboy football history.

== East–West Shrine Game ==
Hilger was selected to play in the 60th East–West Shrine Game at Stanford Stadium in Palo Alto, California in January 1985. Hilger and University of Nevada, Las Vegas quarterback Randall Cunningham were teamed with (1984 National Champion) head coach LaVell Edwards of Brigham Young University. Hilger's skills were displayed in a pro-style offense and under the watchful eyes of NFL owners, coaches, and scouts for the first time.

== NFL career ==
In the sixth round with the 143rd overall pick of the 1985 NFL draft, Al Davis and the Los Angeles Raiders selected Rusty Hilger. At the time, Hilger was the only Raider rookie quarterback ever to enter a regular season game and throw a touchdown pass. After two seasons as a backup to Jim Plunkett and Marc Wilson, Al Davis named Hilger the starting quarterback for the 1987 season, making him the youngest quarterback in Raider franchise history. Hilger and the Raiders opened the season 2–0 before the 1987 NFL Players Association strike halted play, and replacement players took the field. The Raiders would finish the 1987 season with a 5–10 record, their worst since 1963.

In 1988, Hilger underwent a knee surgery that changed the course of his career and led to his termination from the Raiders. After missing the first five games of the 1988 season, Hilger signed with the Detroit Lions despite failing his physical. Only six days after arriving in Detroit, Hilger was forced into action. Without a grasp of the playbook, Hilger managed to call plays, attempt a career-high 43 passes, and toss a touchdown in the 24–7 loss against the Chicago Bears. By season's end, Hilger was named the Lions Offensive MVP for the 1988 season. In 1989, the Lions released Hilger due to his bone-on-bone knee condition. In 1990, Hilger teamed with former Raiders Head Coach Tom Flores and the Seattle Seahawks. The Seahawks released Hilger prior to the season opener, and former Raiders Offensive Coordinator Larry Kennan and the Indianapolis Colts picked him up. Hilger signed with the Indianapolis Colts and spent the remainder of the season with the Colts. At season's end, Coach Larry Kennan joined former Raider Head Coach Tom Flores in Seattle. Hilger remained under contract with the Colts until released just days before the 1991 season opener. He then re-signed with the Seahawks for the 1991 and 1992 seasons. Chronic arthritis forced Hilger to retire after the 1992 season.

== Death ==
Hilger died on December 24, 2019, after a battle with esophageal cancer.
