= Danny Greene (American football) =

American football player (born 1961)

No. 84
- Position: Wide receiver

Personal information
- Born: December 26, 1961 (age 64); Compton, California, U.S.
- Listed height: 5 ft 11 in (1.80 m)
- Listed weight: 190 lb (86 kg)

Career information
- High school: Compton (CA)
- College: Washington
- NFL draft: 1985: 3rd round, 81st overall pick

Career history
- Seattle Seahawks (1985); San Diego Chargers (1987)

Career NFL statistics
- Receptions: 2
- Receiving yards: 10
- Touchdowns: 1
- Stats at Pro Football Reference

Theodore Daniel Greene II (born December 26, 1961) is an American former professional football player who was a wide receiver for one season with the Seattle Seahawks in the National Football League (NFL). He was a third-round draft selection (81st overall) of the Seahawks in the 1985 NFL draft. He played college football at the University of Washington, where he was a team captain.

== See also ==
- "Pro Football Reference". Pro-Football-Reference.com.
- "NFL.com". NFL.com.
- "Washington Record Book" (PDF). University of Washington. Archived from the original (PDF) on September 22, 2010.
