= 1985 NFL draft =

National Football League draft

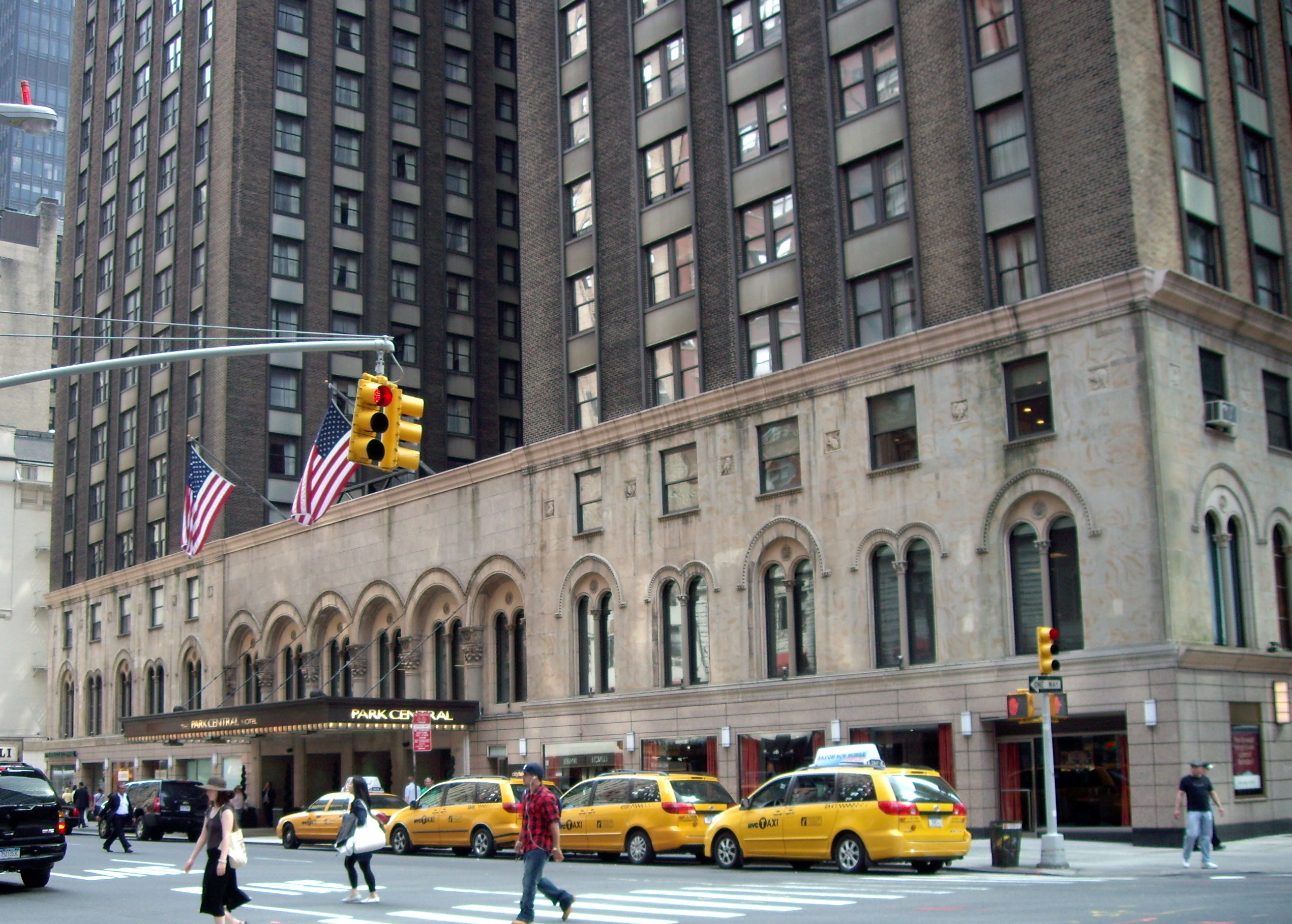
- Park Central Hotel (draft venue), photographed in 2010

General information
- Date: April 30 – May 1, 1985
- Location: Omni Park Central Hotel in New York City, New York
- Network: ESPN

Overview
- 336 total selections in 12 rounds
- League: NFL
- First selection: Bruce Smith, DE; Buffalo Bills
- Mr. Irrelevant: Donald Chumley, DT; San Francisco 49ers
- Most selections (17): Buffalo Bills; Cincinnati Bengals; Los Angeles Raiders
- Fewest selections (6): San Francisco 49ers
- Hall of Famers: 5: DE Bruce Smith; DE Chris Doleman; WR Jerry Rice; WR Andre Reed; LB Kevin Greene

The 1985 NFL draft was the procedure by which National Football League teams selected amateur college football players. The draft was held April 30 and May 1, 1985, at the Omni Park Central Hotel in New York City, New York. The league also held a supplemental draft after the regular draft and before the regular season.

The first six selections of the draft made at least one Pro Bowl, and three of the first 16 picks—Bruce Smith, Chris Doleman, and Jerry Rice—have been inducted into the Pro Football Hall of Fame.

For the second consecutive draft, there were no quarterbacks chosen in the first round (Day One). The Buffalo Bills used the first overall pick of the draft to select defensive end Bruce Smith. Randall Cunningham was the first quarterback selected (second round) by the Philadelphia Eagles. Of note, University of Miami quarterback Bernie Kosar was taken by the Cleveland Browns in the supplemental draft several months later.

== Player selections ==
*	Compensatory selection
†	Pro Bowler
‡	Hall of Famer

Positions key
Offense	Defense	Special teams
QB — Quarterback; RB — Running back; FB — Fullback; WR — Wide receiver; TE — Tight end; OL — Offensive lineman; T — Tackle; G — Guard; C — Center	DL — Defensive lineman; DT — Defensive tackle (Note: Includes nose tackle (NT)); DE — Defensive end; EDGE — Edge rusher; LB — Linebacker (Note: Includes middle linebacker (MLB/MIKE), weakside linebacker (WILL), strongside linebacker (SAM), off-ball linebacker, and outside linebacker (OLB)); DB — Defensive back; CB — Cornerback; S — Safety (Note: Includes free safety (FS) and strong safety (SS))	K — Kicker (Note: Also known as a placekicker (PK)); P — Punter; LS — Long snapper; RS — Return specialist (Note: Includes kickoff and punt returners)

Rnd.	Pick	Team	Player	Pos.	College	Notes
1	1	Buffalo Bills	Bruce Smith^{‡}^{†}	DE	Virginia Tech	
1	2	Atlanta Falcons	Bill Fralic ^{†}	G	Pittsburgh	from Houston via Minnesota (Note: No. 2: Houston → Minnesota → Atlanta. Multiple trades: Houston → Minnesota (PD). Houston traded a first-round selection (2nd overall) to Minnesota in exchange for first- and second-round selections (3rd and 30th). The second-round selection was returned to Minnesota after the Vikings neither used the first-round selection to draft DE Ray Childress nor traded it to another team who then used the pick to draft Childress. Minnesota → Atlanta (D). Minnesota traded a first-round selection (2nd overall) to Atlanta in exchange for first- and third-round selections (3rd and 60th overall).)
1	3	Houston Oilers	Ray Childress ^{†}	DT	Texas A&M	from Minnesota (Note: No. 3: Minnesota → Houston (D). See Round 1: Houston → Minnesota.)
1	4	Minnesota Vikings	Chris Doleman^{‡}^{†}	DE	Pittsburgh	from Atlanta (Note: No. 4: Atlanta → Minnesota (D). See Round 1: Minnesota → Atlanta.)
1	5	Indianapolis Colts	Duane Bickett ^{†}	LB	USC	
1	6	Detroit Lions	Lomas Brown ^{†}	T	Florida	
1	7	Green Bay Packers	Ken Ruettgers	T	USC	from Cleveland via Buffalo (Note: No. 7: Cleveland → Buffalo → Green Bay. Multiple trades: Cleveland → Buffalo (PD). Cleveland traded first- and third-round selections (7th and 63rd overall), and 1986 first- and sixth-round selections to Buffalo in exchange for QB Bernie Kosar. Buffalo → Green Bay (D). Buffalo traded a first-round selection (7th overall) and a 1986 fourth-round selection to Green Bay in exchange for first- and second round selections (14th and 42nd overall).)
1	8	Tampa Bay Buccaneers	Ron Holmes	DE	Washington	
1	9	Philadelphia Eagles	Kevin Allen	T	Indiana	
1	10	New York Jets	Al Toon ^{†}	WR	Wisconsin	
1	11	Houston Oilers	Richard Johnson	CB	Wisconsin	from New Orleans (Note: No. 11: New Orleans → Houston (PD). New Orleans traded a first-round selection (11th overall) to Houston in exchange for RB Earl Campbell.)
1	12	San Diego Chargers	Jim Lachey ^{†}	T	Ohio State	
1	13	Cincinnati Bengals	Eddie Brown ^{†}	WR	Miami (FL)	
1	14	Buffalo Bills	Derrick Burroughs	CB	Memphis State	from Green Bay (Note: No. 14: Green Bay → Buffalo (D). See Round 1: Buffalo → Green Bay.)
1	15	Kansas City Chiefs	Ethan Horton ^{†}	TE	North Carolina	
1	16	San Francisco 49ers	Jerry Rice^{‡}^{†}	WR	Mississippi Valley State	from New England (Note: No. 16: New England → San Francisco (D). New England traded first- and third-round selections (16th and 75th overall) to San Francisco in exchange for first-, second- and third-round selections (28th, 56th and 84th overall).)
1	17	Dallas Cowboys	Kevin Brooks	DE	Michigan	
1	18	St. Louis Cardinals	Freddie Joe Nunn	LB	Ole Miss	
1	19	New York Giants	George Adams	RB	Kentucky	
1	20	Pittsburgh Steelers	Darryl Sims	DT	Wisconsin	
1	21	Los Angeles Rams	Jerry Gray ^{†}	CB	Texas	
1	22	Chicago Bears	William Perry	DT	Clemson	
1	23	Los Angeles Raiders	Jessie Hester	WR	Florida State	
1	24	New Orleans Saints	Alvin Toles	LB	Tennessee	from Washington (Note: No. 24: Washington → New Orleans (PD). Washington traded a first-round selection (24th overall) to New Orleans in exchange for fifth-, tenth- and eleventh-round selections (122nd, 263rd and 290th), and RB George Rogers.)
1	25	Cincinnati Bengals	Emanuel King	LB	Alabama	from Seattle (Note: No. 25: Seattle → Cincinnati (PD). Seattle traded a first-round selection (25th overall) to Cincinnati in exchange for C Blair Bush.)
1	26	Denver Broncos	Steve Sewell	RB	Oklahoma	
1	27	Miami Dolphins	Lorenzo Hampton	RB	Florida	
1	28	New England Patriots	Trevor Matich	C	BYU	from San Francisco (Note: No. 28: San Francisco → New England (D). See Round 1: New England → San Francisco.)
2	29	Buffalo Bills	Mark Traynowicz	G	Nebraska	
2	30	Minnesota Vikings	Issiac Holt	CB	Alcorn State	
2	31	Denver Broncos	Vance Johnson	WR	Arizona	from Houston (Note: No. 31: Houston → Denver (D). Houston traded a second-round selection (31st overall) to Denver in exchange for second- and fifth-round selections (36th and 138th overall).)
2	32	Indianapolis Colts	Don Anderson	CB	Purdue	
2	33	Washington Redskins	Tory Nixon	CB	San Diego State	from Atlanta (Note: No. 33: Atlanta → Washington (PD). Atlanta traded a second-round selection (33rd overall), and 1986 second- and sixth-round selections to Washington in exchange for a second-round selection (51st overall), a 1986 first-round selection and RB Joe Washington.)
2	34	Detroit Lions	Kevin Glover ^{†}	C	Maryland	
2	35	Cleveland Browns	Greg Allen	RB	Florida State	
2	36	Houston Oilers	Richard Byrd	DE	Southern Miss	from Tampa Bay via Denver (Note: No. 36: Tampa Bay → Denver → Houston. Multiple trades: Tampa Bay → Denver (PD). Tampa Bay traded a second-round selection (36th overall) and a 1984 fourth-round selection to Denver in exchange for QB Steve DeBerg. Denver → Houston (D). See Round 2: Houston → Denver.)
2	37	Philadelphia Eagles	Randall Cunningham ^{†}	QB	UNLV	
2	38	New Orleans Saints	Daren Gilbert	T	Cal State Fullerton	
2	39	San Diego Chargers	Wayne Davis	CB	Indiana State	
2	40	New York Jets	Lester Lyles	CB	Virginia	
2	41	Kansas City Chiefs	Jonathan Hayes	TE	Iowa	
2	42	Buffalo Bills	Chris Burkett	WR	Jackson State	from Green Bay (Note: No. 42: Green Bay → Buffalo (D). See Round 1: Buffalo → Green Bay.)
2	43	Cincinnati Bengals	Carl Zander	LB	Tennessee	
2	44	Dallas Cowboys	Jesse Penn	LB	Virginia Tech	
2	45	Atlanta Falcons	Mike Gann	DE	Notre Dame	from St. Louis (Note: No. 45: St. Louis → Atlanta (D). St. Louis traded a second-round selection (45th overall) to Atlanta in exchange for second- and fifth-round selections (51st and 116th overall).)
2	46	New York Giants	Stacy Robinson	WR	North Dakota State	
2	47	Pittsburgh Steelers	Mark Behning	T	Nebraska	
2	48	New England Patriots	Garin Veris	DE	Stanford	
2	49	Chicago Bears	Reggie Phillips	CB	SMU	
2	50	Los Angeles Rams	Chuck Scott	WR	Vanderbilt	
2	51	St. Louis Cardinals	Scott Bergold	T	Wisconsin	from Washington via Atlanta (Note: No. 51: Washington → Atlanta → St. Louis. Multiple trades: Washington → Atlanta (PD). See Round 2: Atlanta → Washington. Atlanta → St. Louis (D). See Round 2: St. Louis → Atlanta.)
2	52	New England Patriots	Jim Bowman	CB	Central Michigan	from LA Raiders (Note: No. 52: LA Raiders → New England (PD). The LA Raiders traded a second-round selection (52nd overall) and a 1984 first-round selection to New England in exchange for a seventh-round selection (192nd overall) and CB Mike Haynes.)
2	53	Seattle Seahawks	Owen Gill	RB	Iowa	
2	54	Denver Broncos	Simon Fletcher	DE	Houston	
2	55	San Diego Chargers	Jeffery Dale	S	LSU	from Miami (Note: No. 55: Miami → San Diego (PD). Miami traded a second-round selection (55th overall) and the rights to DE Dewey Forte to San Diego in exchange for FB Pete Johnson.)
2	56	New England Patriots	Ben Thomas	DE	Auburn	from San Francisco (Note: No. 56: San Francisco → New England (D). See Round 1: New England → San Francisco.)
3	57	Buffalo Bills	Frank Reich	QB	Maryland	
3	58	New York Giants	Tyrone Davis	CB	Clemson	from Houston (Note: No. 58: Houston → NY Giants (PD). Houston traded a third-round selection (58th) to the NY Giants in exchange for RB Butch Woolfolk.)
3	59	Minnesota Vikings	Kirk Lowdermilk	C	Ohio State	
3	60	Minnesota Vikings	Tim Meamber	LB	Washington	from Atlanta (Note: No. 60: Atlanta → Minnesota (D). See Round 1: Minnesota → Atlanta.)
3	61	Indianapolis Colts	Anthony Young	S	Temple	
3	62	Detroit Lions	James Johnson	LB	San Diego State	
3	63	Buffalo Bills	Hal Garner	LB	Utah State	from Cleveland (Note: No. 63: Cleveland → Buffalo (PD). See Round 1: Cleveland → Buffalo.)
3	64	Tampa Bay Buccaneers	Ervin Randle	LB	Baylor	
3	65	Miami Dolphins	George Little	DT	Iowa	from Philadelphia (Note: No. 65: Philadelphia → Miami (PD). Philadelphia traded a third-round selection (65th overall) to Miami in exchange for C Mark Dennard.)
3	66	Minnesota Vikings	Tim Long	T	Memphis State	from San Diego (Note: No. 66: San Diego → Minnesota (PD). San Diego traded a third-round selection (66th overall) to Minnesota in exchange for CB John Turner.)
3	67	New York Jets	Donnie Elder	CB	Memphis State	
3	68	New Orleans Saints	Jack Del Rio ^{†}	LB	USC	
3	69	San Diego Chargers	John Hendy	CB	Long Beach State	from Kansas City (Note: No. 69: Kansas City → San Diego (PD). Kansas City traded a third-round selection (69th overall) and a 1986 fifth-round selection to San Diego in exchange for C Bob Rush.)
3	70	Cincinnati Bengals	Sean Thomas	CB	TCU	
3	71	Green Bay Packers	Rich Moran	G	San Diego State	
3	72	St. Louis Cardinals	Lance Smith	T	LSU	
3	73	New York Giants	Brian Johnston	C	North Carolina	
3	74	Pittsburgh Steelers	Liffort Hobley	S	LSU	
3	75	San Francisco 49ers	Ricky Moore	RB	Alabama	from New England (Note: No. 75: New England → San Francisco (D). See Round 1: New England → San Francisco.)
3	76	Dallas Cowboys	Crawford Ker	G	Florida	
3	77	Los Angeles Rams	Dale Hatcher ^{†}	P	Clemson	
3	78	Chicago Bears	James Maness	WR	TCU	
3	79	Los Angeles Raiders	Tim Moffett	WR	Ole Miss	
3	80	Los Angeles Raiders	Stefon Adams	CB	East Carolina	from Washington via Houston (Note: No. 80: Washington → Houston → LA Raiders. Multiple trades: Washington → Houston (??). Washington traded a third-round selection (80th overall) to Houston in exchange for a 1984 fourth-round selection. Houston → LA Raiders (PD). Houston traded third- and sixth-round selections (80th and 143rd overall) to the LA Raiders in exchange for C Jim Romano.)
3	81	Seattle Seahawks	Danny Greene	WR	Washington	from Seattle via New England (Note: No. 81: Seattle → New England → Seattle. Multiple trades: Seattle → New England (PD). Seattle traded a third-round selection (81st overall) to New England in exchange for OT Bob Cryder. New England → Seattle (D). New England traded a third-round selection (81st overall) to Seattle in exchange for a 1986 second-round selection.)
3	82	Houston Oilers	Mike Kelley	C	Notre Dame	from Denver (Note: No. 82: Denver → Houston (PD). Denver traded a third-round selection (82nd overall) to Houston in exchange for WR Butch Johnson.)
3	83	Miami Dolphins	Alex Moyer	LB	Northwestern	
3	84	New England Patriots	Audray McMillian ^{†}	CB	Houston	from San Francisco (Note: No. 84: San Francisco → New England (D). See Round 1: New England → San Francisco.)
4	85	Minnesota Vikings	Buster Rhymes	WR	Oklahoma	
4	86	Buffalo Bills	Andre Reed^{‡}^{†}	WR	Kutztown (PA)	
4	87	Houston Oilers	Tom Briehl	LB	Stanford	
4	88	Indianapolis Colts	Willie Broughton	DE	Miami (FL)	
4	89	Atlanta Falcons	Emile Harry	WR	Stanford	
4	90	Detroit Lions	Kevin Hancock	LB	Baylor	
4	91	Miami Dolphins	Mike Smith	DB	UTEP	from Cleveland (Note: No. 91: Cleveland → Miami (PD). Cleveland traded a fourth-round selection (91st overall) to Miami in exchange for WR Duriel Harris.)
4	92	Tampa Bay Buccaneers	Mike Heaven	DB	Illinois	
4	93	Philadelphia Eagles	Greg Naron	G	North Carolina	
4	94	New York Jets	Doug Allen	WR	Arizona State	
4	95	New Orleans Saints	Billy Allen	DB	Florida State	
4	96	San Diego Chargers	Ralf Mojsiejenko ^{†}	K	Michigan State	
4	97	Cincinnati Bengals	Anthony Tuggle	DB	Nicholls State	
4	98	Green Bay Packers	Walter Stanley	WR	Mesa State	
4	99	Kansas City Chiefs	Bob Olderman	G	Virginia	
4	100	New York Giants	Mark Bavaro ^{†}	TE	Notre Dame	
4	101	Pittsburgh Steelers	Dan Turk	C	Wisconsin	
4	102	New England Patriots	Tom Toth	T	Western Michigan	
4	103	Dallas Cowboys	Robert Lavette	RB	Georgia Tech	
4	104	St. Louis Cardinals	Ron Wolfley ^{†}	RB	West Virginia	
4	105	Chicago Bears	Kevin Butler	K	Georgia	
4	106	Minnesota Vikings	Kyle Morrell	DB	BYU	from LA Rams (Note: No. 106: LA Rams → Minnesota (PD). The LA Rams traded a fourth-round selection (106th) to Minnesota in exchange for QB Steve Dils.)
4	107	Los Angeles Raiders	Jamie Kimmel	LB	Syracuse	from Washington (Note: No. 107: Washington → LA Raiders (PD). Washington traded a fourth-round selection (107th overall) to the LA Raiders in exchange for WR Calvin Muhammad.)
4	108	New England Patriots	Gerald Phelan	WR	Boston College	from LA Raiders (Note: No. 108: LA Raiders → New England (PD). The LA Raiders traded a fourth-round selection (108th overall) to New England in exchange for OT Shelby Jordan.)
4	109	Seattle Seahawks	Tony Davis	TE	Missouri	
4	110	Denver Broncos	Keli McGregor	TE	Colorado State	
4	111	Miami Dolphins	Jeff Dellenbach	T	Wisconsin	
4	112	Buffalo Bills	Dale Hellestrae	T	SMU	from San Francisco (Note: No. 112: San Francisco → Buffalo (PD). San Francisco traded a fourth-round selection (108th overall) to Buffalo in exchange for CB Mario Clark.)
5	113	Los Angeles Rams	Kevin Greene^{‡}^{†}	LB	Auburn	from Buffalo (Note: No. 113: Buffalo → LA Rams (PD). Buffalo traded a fifth-round selection (113th overall) to the LA Rams in exchange for WR Preston Dennard.)
5	114	Dallas Cowboys	Herschel Walker ^{†}	RB	Georgia	from Houston (Note: No. 114: Houston → Dallas (PD). Houston traded a fifth-round selection (114th overall), a 1984 second-round selection and WR Mike Renfro to Dallas in exchange for a 1984 second-round selection and WR Butch Johnson.)
5	115	Minnesota Vikings	Mark MacDonald	G	Boston College	
5	116	St. Louis Cardinals	K. D. Dunn	TE	Clemson	from Atlanta (Note: No. 116: Atlanta → St. Louis (D). See Round 2: St. Louis → Atlanta.)
5	117	Indianapolis Colts	Roger Caron	T	Harvard	
5	118	Detroit Lions	Joe McIntosh	RB	NC State	
5	119	Dallas Cowboys	Matt Darwin	C	Texas A&M	from Cleveland via Buffalo (Note: No. 119: Cleveland → Buffalo → Dallas. Multiple trades: Cleveland → Buffalo (PD). Cleveland traded a fifth-round selection (119th overall), a 1983 first-round selection and a 1984 third-round selection to Buffalo in exchange for the rights to LB Tom Cousineau. Buffalo → Dallas (D). Buffalo traded a fifth-round selection (119th overall) and a 1986 sixth-round selection to Dallas in exchange for a fifth-round selection (130th overall) and CB Rod Hill.)
5	120	New York Jets	Troy Benson	LB	Pittsburgh	from Tampa Bay (Note: No. 120: Tampa Bay → NY Jets (PD). Buffalo traded a fifth-round selection (120th overall) to the NY Jets in exchange for RB Scott Dierking.)
5	121	Philadelphia Eagles	Dwayne Jiles	LB	Texas Tech	
5	122	Washington Redskins	Raphel Cherry	DB	Hawaii	from New Orleans (Note: No. 122: New Orleans → Washington (PD). See Round 1: Washington → New Orleans.)
5	123	Seattle Seahawks	Mark Napolitan	C	Michigan State	from San Diego (Note: No. 123: San Diego → Seattle (PD). San Diego traded a fifth-round selection (122nd overall) and a 1984 fifth-round selection to Seattle in exchange for WR Roger Carr and RB Sherman Smith.)
5	124	New York Jets	Brian Luft	DT	USC	
5	125	Green Bay Packers	Brian Noble	LB	Arizona State	
5	126	Kansas City Chiefs	Bruce King	RB	Purdue	
5	127	Cincinnati Bengals	Tony Degrate	DT	Texas	
5	128	Seattle Seahawks	Arnold Brown	DB	North Carolina Central	from Pittsburgh (Note: No. 128: Pittsburgh → Seattle (PD). Pittsburgh traded a fifth-round selection (128th overall) to Seattle in exchange for OT Steve August.)
5	129	Cincinnati Bengals	Lee Davis	DB	Ole Miss	from New England (Note: No. 129: New England → Cincinnati (PD). New England traded a fifth-round selection (129th), two 1984 first-round selections and a 1984 tenth-round selection to Cincinnati in exchange for a 1984 first-round selection.)
5	130	Buffalo Bills	Jimmy Teal	WR	Texas A&M	from Dallas (Note: No. 130: Dallas → Buffalo (D). See Round 5: Buffalo → Dallas.)
5	131	St. Louis Cardinals	Louis Wong	G	BYU	
5	132	New York Giants	Tracy Henderson	WR	Iowa State	
5	133	Houston Oilers	Frank Bush	LB	NC State	from LA Rams via Kansas City (Note: No. 133: LA Rams → Kansas City → Houston. Multiple trades: LA Rams → Kansas City (PD). The LA Rams traded a fifth-round selection (133rd overall) and CB Lucious Smith to Kansas City in exchange for QB Steve Fuller. Kansas City → Houston (PD). Kansas City traded fifth- and sixth-round selections (133rd and 153rd overall) to Houston in exchange for a 1986 fourth-round selection and DE Bob Hamm.)
5	134	New York Jets	Tony Smith	WR	San Jose State	from Chicago (Note: No. 134: Chicago → NY Jets (PD). Chicago traded a fifth-round selection (133rd overall) to the NY Jets in exchange for DE Tyrone Keys.)
5	135	Los Angeles Raiders	Dan Reeder	RB	Delaware	
5	136	Pittsburgh Steelers	Cam Jacobs	LB	Kentucky	from Washington (Note: No. 136: Washington → Pittsburgh (PD). Washington traded a fifth-round selection (136th overall) to Pittsburgh in exchange for G Rick Donnalley.)
5	137	Seattle Seahawks	Johnnie Jones	RB	Tennessee	
5	138	Houston Oilers	Lee Johnson	K/P	BYU	from Denver (Note: No. 138: Denver → Houston (D). See Round 2: Houston → Denver.)
5	139	Denver Broncos	Billy Hinson	G	Florida	from Miami (Note: No. 139: Miami → Denver (PD). Miami traded a fifth-round selection (139th overall) to Denver in exchange for LB Larry Evans.)
5	140	San Francisco 49ers	Bruce Collie	T	Texas–Arlington	
6	141	Buffalo Bills	Mike Hamby	DT	Utah State	
6	142	Minnesota Vikings	Steve Bono ^{†}	QB	UCLA	
6	143	Los Angeles Raiders	Rusty Hilger	QB	Oklahoma State	from Houston (Note: No. 143: Houston → LA Raiders (PD). See Round 3: Houston → LA Raiders.)
6	144	Dallas Cowboys	Kurt Ploeger	DE	Gustavus Adolphus	from Indianapolis (Note: No. 144: Indianapolis → Dallas (PD). Indianapolis traded a sixth-round selection (144th overall) to Dallas in exchange for OT Steve Wright.)
6	145	Miami Dolphins	George Shorthose	WR	Missouri	from Atlanta (Note: No. 145: Atlanta → Miami (PD). Atlanta traded a sixth-round selection (145th overall) and OT Ronnie Lee to Miami in exchange for CB Gerald Small.)
6	146	Detroit Lions	Stan Short	G	Penn State	
6	147	Cleveland Browns	Mark Krerowicz	G	Ohio State	
6	148	Cincinnati Bengals	Eric Stokes	G	Northeastern	from Tampa Bay (Note: No. 148: Tampa Bay → Cincinnati (PD). Tampa Bay traded a sixth-round selection (148th overall) to Cincinnati in exchange for OT Don Swafford.)
6	149	Kansas City Chiefs	John Bostic	CB	Bethune–Cookman	from Philadelphia (Note: No. 149: Philadelphia → Kansas City (PD). Philadelphia traded a sixth-round selection (149th overall) to Kansas City in exchange for DB John Bostic.)
6	150	San Diego Chargers	Terry Lewis	CB	Michigan State	
6	151	New York Jets	Jeff Deaton	G	Stanford	
6	152	Atlanta Falcons	Reggie Pleasant	CB	Clemson	from New Orleans (Note: No. 152: New Orleans → Atlanta (PD). New Orleans traded a sixth-round selection (152nd overall) to Atlanta in exchange for TE Junior Miller.)
6	153	Houston Oilers	Joe Krakowki	LB	Washington	from Kansas City (Note: No. 153: Kansas City → Houston (D). See Round 5: Kansas City → Houston.)
6	154	Cincinnati Bengals	Keith Lester	TE	Murray State	
6	155	Green Bay Packers	Mark Lewis	TE	Texas A&M	
6	156	Philadelphia Eagles	Ken Reeves	T	Texas A&M	from New England (Note: No. 156: New England → Philadelphia (PD). New England traded a sixth-round selection (156th overall) to Philadelphia in exchange for K Tony Franklin.)
6	157	Dallas Cowboys	Matt Moran	G	Stanford	
6	158	St. Louis Cardinals	Jay Novacek ^{†}	TE	Wyoming	
6	159	New York Giants	Jack Oliver	G	Memphis State	
6	160	Pittsburgh Steelers	Gregg Carr	LB	Auburn	
6	161	Los Angeles Rams	Michael Young	WR	UCLA	from Chicago (Note: No. 161: Chicago → LA Rams (PD). Chicago traded a sixth-round selection (161st overall) and a 1984 eleventh-round selection to the LA Rams in exchange for QB Steve Fuller.)
6	162	Los Angeles Rams	Damone Johnson	TE	Cal Poly	
6	163	Washington Redskins	Danzell Lee	TE	Lamar	
6	164	Minnesota Vikings	Tim Newton	DT	Florida	from LA Raiders (Note: No. 164: LA Raiders → Minnesota (PD). The LA Raiders traded a sixth-round selection (164th overall) and a 1986 second-round selection to Minnesota in exchange for LB Brad Van Pelt.)
6	165	New York Giants	Mark Pembrook	DB	Cal State Fullerton	from Seattle (Note: No. 165: Seattle → NY Giants (PD). Seattle traded a sixth-round selection (165th overall) to the NY Giants in exchange for CB Terry Jackson.)
6	166	New York Jets	Rich Miano	S	Hawaii	from Denver (Note: No. 166: Denver → NY Jets (PD). Denver traded a sixth-round selection (166th overall) to the NY Jets in exchange for LB Stan Blinka.)
6	167	Miami Dolphins	Ron Davenport	FB	Louisville	
6	168	San Francisco 49ers	Scott Barry	QB	UC Davis	
7	169	Buffalo Bills	Ron Pitts	CB	UCLA	
7	170	Houston Oilers	Mike Akiu	WR	Hawaii	
7	171	Green Bay Packers	Eric Wilson	LB	Maryland	from Minnesota (Note: No. 171: Minnesota → Green Bay (PD). Minnesota traded a seventh-round selection (171st overall) to Green Bay in exchange for K Jan Stenerud.)
7	172	Cincinnati Bengals	Kim Locklin	RB	New Mexico State	from Atlanta (Note: No. 172: Atlanta → Cincinnati (PD). Atlanta traded a seventh-round selection (172nd overall) to Cincinnati in exchange for DE Gary Burley.)
7	173	Indianapolis Colts	James Harbour	WR	Ole Miss	
7	174	Detroit Lions	Tony Staten	DB	Angelo State	
7	175	Cleveland Browns	Reggie Langhorne	WR	Elizabeth City State	
7	176	Tampa Bay Buccaneers	Mike Prior	S	Illinois State	
7	177	Washington Redskins	Jamie Harris	WR	Oklahoma State	from Philadelphia (Note: No. 177: Philadelphia → Washington (PD). Philadelphia traded a seventh-round selection (177th overall) to Washington in exchange for QB Bob Holly.)
7	178	Dallas Cowboys	Karl Powe	WR	Alabama State	from NY Jets via Kansas City (Note: No. 178: NY Jets → Kansas City → Dallas. Multiple trades: NY Jets → Kansas City (PD). The NY Jets traded a seventh-round selection (178th overall) to Kansas City in exchange for LB Charles Jackson. Kansas City → Dallas (PD). Kansas City traded a seventh-round selection (178th overall) to Dallas in exchange for RB Lawrence Ricks.)
7	179	New Orleans Saints	Eric Martin ^{†}	WR	LSU	
7	180	Kansas City Chiefs	Vince Thompson	DE	Missouri Western	from San Diego (Note: No. 180: San Diego → Kansas City (PD). San Diego traded a seventh-round selection (180th overall) to Kansas City in exchange for RB Jewerl Thomas.)
7	181	Cincinnati Bengals	Joe Walter	T	Texas Tech	
7	182	Green Bay Packers	Gary Ellerson	RB	Wisconsin	
7	183	Kansas City Chiefs	Dave Heffernan	G	Miami (FL)	
7	184	Dallas Cowboys	Jim Herrmann	DE	BYU	
7	185	Washington Redskins	Lionel Vital	RB	Nicholls State	from St. Louis via Kansas City (Note: No. 185: St. Louis → Kansas City → Washington. Multiple trades: St. Louis → Kansas City (PD). St. Louis traded a seventh-round selection (185th overall) to Kansas City in exchange for LB Thomas Howard. Kansas City → Washington (D). Kansas City traded a seventh-round selection (185th overall) to Washington in exchange for a 1986 sixth-round selection.)
7	186	Los Angeles Raiders	Kevin Belcher	T	Wisconsin	from NY Giants (Note: No. 186: NY Giants → LA Raiders (PD). The NY Giants traded a seventh-round selection (186th overall) to the LA Raiders in exchange for S Kenny Hill.)
7	187	Pittsburgh Steelers	Alan Andrews	TE	Rutgers	
7	188	Los Angeles Raiders	Mark Pattison	WR	Washington	from New England (Note: No. 188: New England → LA Raiders (PD). New England sent a seventh-round selection (188th overall) to the LA Raiders as compensation for hiring John Polonchek as special assistant to the head coach.)
7	189	Los Angeles Rams	Danny Bradley	RB	Oklahoma	
7	190	Chicago Bears	Charles Bennett	DE	Southwestern Louisiana	
7	191	Los Angeles Raiders	Bret Clark	S	Nebraska	
7	192	Los Angeles Raiders	Nick Haden	C	Penn State	from Washington via New England (Note: No. 192: Washington → New England → LA Raiders. Multiple trades: Washington → New England (PD). Washington traded a seventh-round selection (192nd overall) to New England in exchange for CB Ricky Smith. New England → LA Raiders (PD). See Round 2: LA Raiders → New England.)
7	193	Seattle Seahawks	Ron Mattes	T	Virginia	
7	194	Denver Broncos	Dallas Cameron	DT	Miami (FL)	
7	195	Miami Dolphins	Fuad Reveiz ^{†}	K	Tennessee	
7	196	San Diego Chargers	Mark Fellows	LB	Montana State	from San Francisco (Note: No. 196: San Francisco → San Diego (PD). San Francisco traded a seventh-round selection (196th overall) and a 1983 eighth-round selection to San Diego in exchange for LB Bob Horn.)
8	197	Buffalo Bills	Jacque Robinson	RB	Washington	
8	198	Minnesota Vikings	Nikita Blair	LB	UTEP	
8	199	Houston Oilers	Chuck Thomas	C	Oklahoma	
8	200	Indianapolis Colts	Ricky Nichols	WR	East Carolina	
8	201	Atlanta Falcons	Ashley Lee	DB	Virginia Tech	
8	202	Detroit Lions	Scott Caldwell	RB	Texas–Arlington	
8	203	Cleveland Browns	Fred Ray Banks	WR	Liberty	
8	204	Tampa Bay Buccaneers	Phil Freeman	WR	Arizona State	
8	205	Philadelphia Eagles	Tom Polley	LB	UNLV	
8	206	New Orleans Saints	Joe Kohlbrand	LB	Miami (FL)	
8	207	San Diego Chargers	Curtis Adams	RB	Central Michigan	
8	208	New York Jets	Matt Monger	LB	Oklahoma State	
8	209	Green Bay Packers	Ken Stills	DB	Wisconsin	
8	210	Kansas City Chiefs	Ira Hillary	WR	South Carolina	
8	211	Cincinnati Bengals	Dave Strobel	LB	Iowa	
8	212	St. Louis Cardinals	Rob Monaco	G	Vanderbilt	
8	213	New York Giants	Lee Rouson	RB	Colorado	
8	214	Pittsburgh Steelers	Harry Newsome	P	Wake Forest	
8	215	Atlanta Falcons	Ronnie Washington	LB	Northeast Louisiana	from New England (Note: No. 215: New England → Atlanta (PD). New England traded an eighth-round selection (215th overall) to Atlanta in exchange for CB Rod McSwain.)
8	216	Dallas Cowboys	Leon Gonzalez	WR	Bethune–Cookman	
8	217	Chicago Bears	Steve Buxton	T	Indiana State	
8	218	Los Angeles Rams	Marlon McIntyre	RB	Pittsburgh	
8	219	Washington Redskins	Barry Wilburn	DB	Ole Miss	
8	220	Los Angeles Raiders	Leonard Wingate	DT	South Carolina State	
8	221	Seattle Seahawks	Judious Lewis	WR	Arkansas State	
8	222	Denver Broncos	Eric Riley	DB	Florida State	
8	223	Miami Dolphins	Dan Sharp	TE	TCU	
8	224	New England Patriots	Milford Hodge	DT	Washington State	from San Francisco (Note: No. 224: San Francisco → New England (PD). San Francisco traded an eighth-round selection (224th overall) and a conditional 1986 selection to New England in exchange for QB Matt Cavanaugh.)
9	225	Buffalo Bills	Glenn Jones	DB	Norfolk State	
9	226	Houston Oilers	Steve Tasker ^{†}	WR	Northwestern	
9	227	Minnesota Vikings	Jamie Covington	RB	Syracuse	
9	228	Atlanta Falcons	Micah Moon	LB	North Carolina	
9	229	Indianapolis Colts	Mark Boyer	TE	USC	
9	230	Detroit Lions	June James	LB	Texas	
9	231	Philadelphia Eagles	Dave Toub	C	UTEP	from Cleveland (Note: No. 231: Cleveland → Philadelphia (PD). Cleveland traded a ninth-round selection (231st overall) to Philadelphia in exchange for DL Carl Hairston.)
9	232	Tampa Bay Buccaneers	Steve Calabria	QB	Colgate	
9	233	Philadelphia Eagles	Joe Drake	DT	Arizona	
9	234	San Diego Chargers	Paul Berner	QB	Pacific	
9	235	New York Jets	Mike Waters	RB	San Diego State	
9	236	New Orleans Saints	Earl Johnson	DB	South Carolina	
9	237	Kansas City Chiefs	Mike Armentrout	DB	Southwest Missouri State	
9	238	Cincinnati Bengals	Keith Cruise	DE	Northwestern	
9	239	Green Bay Packers	Morris Johnson	G	Alabama A&M	
9	240	New York Giants	Frank Wright	DT	South Carolina	
9	241	Pittsburgh Steelers	Fred Small	LB	Washington	
9	242	Pittsburgh Steelers	Andre Harris	DB	Minnesota	from New England (Note: No. 242: New England → Pittsburgh (PD). New England traded a ninth-round selection (242nd overall) to Pittsburgh in exchange for RB Greg Hawthorne.)
9	243	Dallas Cowboys	Scott Strasburger	LB	Nebraska	
9	244	St. Louis Cardinals	Scott Williams	TE	Georgia	
9	245	Los Angeles Rams	Gary Swanson	LB	Cal Poly	
9	246	Los Angeles Raiders	Chris Sydnor	DB	Penn State	
9	247	Washington Redskins	Mitch Geier	G	Troy State	
9	248	Seattle Seahawks	Bob Otto	DE	Idaho State	
9	249	Denver Broncos	Daryl Smith	DB	North Alabama	
9	250	Chicago Bears	Thomas Sanders	RB	Texas A&M	
9	251	Miami Dolphins	Adam Hinds	DB	Oklahoma State	
9	252	San Diego Chargers	Dan Remsberg	T	Abilene Christian	from San Francisco (Note: No. 252: San Francisco → San Diego (PD). San Francisco traded a conditional ninth-round selection (252nd overall), and 1984 eighth- and twelfth-round selections to San Diego in exchange for DT Louie Kelcher.)
10	253	Buffalo Bills	Chris Babyar	G	Illinois	
10	254	Minnesota Vikings	Juan Johnson	WR	Langston	
10	255	Houston Oilers	Mike Golic	DE	Notre Dame	
10	256	Indianapolis Colts	Andre Pinesett	DT	Cal State Fullerton	
10	257	Atlanta Falcons	Brent Martin	C	Stanford	
10	258	Detroit Lions	Clayton Beauford	WR	Auburn	
10	259	Cleveland Browns	Larry Williams	G	Notre Dame	
10	260	Tampa Bay Buccaneers	Donald Igwebuike	K	Clemson	
10	261	Philadelphia Eagles	Mark Kelso	DB	William & Mary	
10	262	New York Jets	Kerry Glenn	DB	Minnesota	
10	263	Washington Redskins	Terry Orr	TE	Texas	from New Orleans (Note: No. 263: New Orleans → Washington (PD). See Round 1: Washington → New Orleans.)
10	264	San Diego Chargers	David King	DB	Auburn	
10	265	Cincinnati Bengals	Bernard King	LB	Syracuse	
10	266	Green Bay Packers	Ronnie Burgess	DB	Wake Forest	
10	267	Kansas City Chiefs	Jeff Smith	RB	Nebraska	
10	268	Pittsburgh Steelers	Oliver White	TE	Kentucky	
10	269	Denver Broncos	Buddy Funck	QB	New Mexico	from New England (Note: No. 269: New England → Denver (PD). New England traded a tenth-round selection (269th overall) to Denver in exchange for P Luke Prestridge.)
10	270	Dallas Cowboys	Joe Jones	TE	Virginia Tech	
10	271	St. Louis Cardinals	Dennis Williams	RB	Furman	
10	272	New York Giants	Gregg Dubroc	LB	LSU	
10	273	Chicago Bears	Pat Coryatt	DT	Baylor	
10	274	Los Angeles Rams	Duval Love ^{†}	G	UCLA	
10	275	Los Angeles Raiders	Reggie McKenzie	LB	Tennessee	from Washington (Note: No. 275: Washington → LA Raiders (PD). Washington traded a tenth-round selection (275th overall) to the LA Raiders in exchange for OT Morris Towns.)
10	276	Los Angeles Raiders	Albert Myres	DB	Tulsa	
10	277	Seattle Seahawks	John Conner	QB	Arizona	
10	278	Denver Broncos	Ron Anderson	LB	SMU	
10	279	Miami Dolphins	Mike Pendleton	DB	Indiana	
10	280	Seattle Seahawks	James Bowers	DB	Memphis State	from San Francisco (Note: No. 280: San Francisco → Seattle (PD). San Francisco traded a tenth-round selection (280th overall) and a 1984 fourth-round selection to Seattle in exchange for DT Manu Tuiasosopo.)
11	281	Houston Oilers	Willie Drewrey	WR	West Virginia	
11	282	Buffalo Bills	James Seawright	LB	South Carolina	
11	283	Minnesota Vikings	Tim Williams	DB	North Carolina A&T	
11	284	Atlanta Falcons	John Ayres	DB	Illinois	
11	285	Los Angeles Rams	Doug Flutie ^{†}	QB	Boston College	1984 Heisman Trophy winner; from Indianapolis (Note: No. 285: Indianapolis → LA Rams (PD). Indianapolis traded an eleventh-round selection (285th overall) to the LA Rams in exchange for DB George Radachowsky.)
11	286	Detroit Lions	Kevin Harris	DB	Georgia	
11	287	Cleveland Browns	Travis Tucker	TE	Southern Connecticut	
11	288	Tampa Bay Buccaneers	Punkin Williams	RB	Memphis State	
11	289	Philadelphia Eagles	Herman Hunter	RB	Tennessee State	
11	290	Washington Redskins	Raleigh McKenzie	G	Tennessee	from New Orleans (Note: No. 290: New Orleans → Washington (PD). See Round 1: Washington → New Orleans.)
11	291	San Diego Chargers	Jeff Smith	DT	Kentucky	
11	292	New York Jets	Brad White	DE	Texas Tech	
11	293	Kansas City Chiefs	Chris Jackson	C	SMU	
11	294	Green Bay Packers	Joe Shield	QB	Trinity (CT)	
11	295	New England Patriots	Paul Lewis	RB	Boston University	
11	296	Cincinnati Bengals	Harold Stanfield	TE	Mississippi College	
11	297	Dallas Cowboys	Neal Dellocono	LB	UCLA	
11	298	St. Louis Cardinals	Ricky Anderson	K	Vanderbilt	
11	299	New York Giants	Al Young	DB	Virginia Tech	
11	300	Pittsburgh Steelers	Terry Matichak	DB	Missouri	
11	301	Los Angeles Rams	Kevin Brown	DB	Northwestern	
11	302	Chicago Bears	Jim Morrissey	LB	Michigan State	
11	303	Los Angeles Raiders	Steve Strachan	RB	Boston College	
11	304	Washington Redskins	Garry Kimble	DB	Sam Houston State	
11	305	Seattle Seahawks	Louis Cooper	LB	Western Carolina	
11	306	Denver Broncos	Gary Rolle	WR	Florida	
11	307	Miami Dolphins	Mike Jones	RB	Tulane	
11	308	San Francisco 49ers	David Wood	DE	Arizona	
12	309	Washington Redskins	Dean Hamel	DT	Tulsa	from Buffalo (Note: No. 309: Buffalo → Washington (??). Terms unknown.)
12	310	Minnesota Vikings	Byron Jones	DT	Tulsa	
12	311	Houston Oilers	Mark Vonder Haar	DT	Minnesota	
12	312	Indianapolis Colts	Dave Burnette	T	Central Arkansas	
12	313	Atlanta Falcons	Ken Whisenhunt	TE	Georgia Tech	
12	314	Detroit Lions	Mike Weaver	G	Georgia	
12	315	Cleveland Browns	Shane Swanson	WR	Nebraska	
12	316	Tampa Bay Buccaneers	Jim Rockford	DB	Oklahoma	
12	317	Philadelphia Eagles	Todd Russell	DB	Boston College	
12	318	San Diego Chargers	Tony Simmons	DE	Tennessee	
12	319	New York Jets	Bill Wallace	WR	Pittsburgh	
12	320	New Orleans Saints	Treg Songy	DB	Tulane	
12	321	Kansas City Chiefs	Harper LeBel	C	Colorado State	
12	322	Cincinnati Bengals	Louis Garza	T	New Mexico State	
12	323	Green Bay Packers	Jim Meyer	P	Arizona State	
12	324	Dallas Cowboys	Karl Jordan	LB	Vanderbilt	
12	325	St. Louis Cardinals	Lonnie Young	DB	Michigan State	
12	326	New York Giants	Herb Welch	DB	UCLA	
12	327	Pittsburgh Steelers	Jeff Sanchez	DB	Georgia	
12	328	New England Patriots	Tony Mumford	RB	Penn State	
12	329	San Diego Chargers	Bret Pearson	TE	Wisconsin	from Chicago (Note: No. 329: Chicago → San Diego (PD). Chicago traded a twelfth-round selection (329th overall) to San Diego in exchange for P Dave Finzer.)
12	330	Tampa Bay Buccaneers	James Melka	LB	Wisconsin	from LA Rams (Note: No. 330: LA Rams → Tampa Bay (PD). The LA Rams traded a twelfth-round selection (330th overall) to Tampa Bay in exchange for DE Booker Reese.)
12	331	Washington Redskins	Bryant Winn	LB	Houston	
12	332	Los Angeles Raiders	Raymond Polk	DB	Oklahoma State	
12	333	Buffalo Bills	Paul Woodside	K	West Virginia	from Seattle (Note: No. 333: Seattle → Buffalo (PD). Seattle traded a twelfth-round selection (333rd overall) to Buffalo in exchange for G Reggie McKenzie.)
12	334	Denver Broncos	Dan Lynch	G	Washington State	
12	335	Miami Dolphins	Ray Noble	DB	California	
12	336	San Francisco 49ers	Donald Chumley	DT	Georgia	

== Supplemental draft ==
Rnd.	Pick	Team	Player	Pos.	College	Notes
1	—	Cleveland Browns	Bernie Kosar ^{†}	QB	Miami (FL)	
8	—	San Francisco 49ers	Roosevelt Snipes	RB	Florida State	

== Hall of Famers ==
- Bruce Smith, defensive end from Virginia Tech, taken in 1st round 1st overall by Buffalo Bills

Inducted: Professional Football Hall of Fame class of 2009.

- Jerry Rice, wide receiver from Mississippi Valley State, taken in 1st round 16th overall by San Francisco 49ers

Inducted: Professional Football Hall of Fame class of 2010.

- Chris Doleman, defensive end from Pittsburgh, taken in 1st round 4th overall by Minnesota Vikings

Inducted: Professional Football Hall of Fame class of 2012.

- Andre Reed, wide receiver from Kutztown, taken in 4th round 86th overall by Buffalo Bills

Inducted: Professional Football Hall of Fame class of 2014.

- Kevin Greene, linebacker from Auburn, taken in 5th round 113th overall by Los Angeles Rams

Inducted: Professional Football Hall of Fame class of 2016.

== Notable undrafted players ==
†	Pro Bowler

Original NFL team	Player	Pos.	College	Notes
Atlanta Falcons	Rick Donnelly	P	Wyoming	
Atlanta Falcons	Tiger Greene	S	Western Carolina	
Atlanta Falcons	Art Price	LB	Wisconsin	
Atlanta Falcons	Leon Thomasson	CB	Texas Southern	
Buffalo Bills	Alex Carter	DE	Tennessee State	
Buffalo Bills	Scott Fulhage	P	Kansas State	
Buffalo Bills	Todd Schlopy	K	Michigan	
Chicago Bears	Don Kindt Jr.	TE	Wisconsin–La Crosse	
Chicago Bears	Ken Knapczyk	WR	Northern Iowa	
Chicago Bears	Keith Ortego	WR	McNeese State	
Chicago Bears	Ken Taylor	CB	Oregon State	
Chicago Bears	Mike Tomczak	QB	Ohio State	
Cleveland Browns	Steve Collier	T	Bethune–Cookman	
Cleveland Browns	Herman Fontenot	RB	LSU	
Cleveland Browns	Paul Tripoli	S	Alabama	
Cleveland Browns	Felix Wright	S	Drake	
Dallas Cowboys	Tommy Haynes	S	USC	
Dallas Cowboys	Pete McCartney	T	Louisville	
Dallas Cowboys	Keith McDonald	WR	San Jose State	
Dallas Cowboys	Bryan Wagner	P	Cal State Northridge	
Denver Broncos	Steve Boadway	LB	Arizona	
Denver Broncos	Bill Lobenstein	DE	Wisconsin–Whitewater	
Denver Broncos	John Trahan	WR	Southern Colorado	
Detroit Lions	Scott Barrows	G	West Virginia	
Detroit Lions	Gary Mullen	WR	West Virginia	
Green Bay Packers	Paul Ott Carruth	RB	Alabama	
Houston Oilers	Mike Clendenen	K	Houston	
Indianapolis Colts	Carl Aikens	WR	Northern Illinois	
Indianapolis Colts	Lamonte Hunley	LB	Arizona	
Kansas City Chiefs	Kelly Goodburn	P	Emporia State	
Kansas City Chiefs	Chris Smith	RB	Notre Dame	
Kansas City Chiefs	Bennie Thompson ^{†}	S	Grambling State	
Los Angeles Raiders	Rod Barksdale	WR	Arizona	
Los Angeles Raiders	Vincent Gamache	P	Cal State Fullerton	
Los Angeles Raiders	Mike Prindle	K	Western Michigan	
Minnesota Vikings	Larry Miller	QB	Northern Iowa	
New England Patriots	Jon Norris	DE	American International	
New England Patriots	Jack Peavey	C	Troy State	
New Orleans Saints	Arnold Campbell	DE	Alcorn State	
New Orleans Saints	Brett Maxie	S	Texas Southern	
New York Giants	Nick Kowgios	RB	Lafayette	
Pittsburgh Steelers	Dave Edwards	S	Illinois	
Pittsburgh Steelers	Preston Gothard	TE	Alabama	
Pittsburgh Steelers	Cornell Gowdy	S	Morgan State	
Pittsburgh Steelers	Alan Huff	DT	Marshall	
Pittsburgh Steelers	Frank Pokorny	WR	Youngstown State	
San Diego Chargers	Timmie Ware	WR	USC	
San Francisco 49ers	Derek Bunch	LB	Michigan State	
San Francisco 49ers	Wymon Henderson	CB	UNLV	
San Francisco 49ers	Charles Huff	CB	Presbyterian	
Seattle Seahawks	Jimmy Colquitt	P	Tennessee	
Seattle Seahawks	Julio Cortes	LB	Miami (FL)	
Seattle Seahawks	Dale Dorning	DE	Oregon	
Seattle Seahawks	Gale Gilbert	QB	California	
Seattle Seahawks	Darrel Hopper	CB	USC	
Seattle Seahawks	Tom Neville	G	Fresno State	
Seattle Seahawks	Eugene Robinson ^{†}	S	Colgate	
Tampa Bay Buccaneers	Joe Johnson	WR	Notre Dame	
Tampa Bay Buccaneers	Calvin Magee	TE	Southern	
Tampa Bay Buccaneers	Rick Schulte	G	Illinois	
Tampa Bay Buccaneers	Alan Veingrad	T	East Texas State	
Tampa Bay Buccaneers	Paul Vogel	LB	South Carolina	
Washington Redskins	Reggie Branch	RB	East Carolina	
Washington Redskins	Dan Coleman	DE	Murray State	
Washington Redskins	Mike Wooten	T	VMI	

== Trades ==
In the explanations below, (D) denotes trades that took place during the 1985 Draft, while (PD) indicates trades completed pre-draft.

Round 1

Round 2

Round 3

Round 4

Round 5

Round 6

Round 7

Round 8

Round 9

Round 10

Round 11

Round 12
