= 1984 BYU Cougars football team =

American college football season

1984 BYU Cougars football

Consensus national champion WAC champion Holiday Bowl champion

Holiday Bowl, W 24–17 vs. Michigan
- Conference: Western Athletic Conference

Ranking
- Coaches: No. 1
- AP: No. 1
- Record: 13–0 (8–0 WAC)
- Head coach: LaVell Edwards (13th season)
- Offensive coordinator: Roger French (4th season)
- Offensive scheme: West Coast
- Defensive coordinator: Dick Felt (10th season)
- Base defense: 4–3
- Home stadium: Cougar Stadium

1984 Western Athletic Conference football standings
	Conf.					Overall
Team	W		L		T	W		L		T
No. 1 BYU $	8	–	0	–	0	13	–	0	–	0
Hawaii	5	–	2	–	0	7	–	4	–	0
Air Force	4	–	3	–	0	8	–	4	–	0
Utah	4	–	3	–	1	6	–	5	–	1
San Diego State	4	–	3	–	1	4	–	7	–	1
Wyoming	4	–	4	–	0	6	–	6	–	0
Colorado State	3	–	5	–	0	3	–	8	–	0
New Mexico	1	–	7	–	0	4	–	8	–	0
UTEP	1	–	7	–	0	2	–	9	–	0
$ – Conference champion; Rankings from AP Poll

The 1984 BYU Cougars football team represented Brigham Young University (BYU) in the 1984 NCAA Division I-A football season. The Cougars were led by 13th-year head coach LaVell Edwards and played their home games at Cougar Stadium in Provo, Utah. The team competed as a member of the Western Athletic Conference, winning the conference for the ninth consecutive year. The Cougars finished the regular season as the only undefeated team in Division I-A, and secured their first ever national title by defeating Michigan in the 1984 Holiday Bowl.

A number of pollsters and coaches were reluctant to name the Cougars as national champion, partly because they believed BYU's schedule was too weak. Only two of BYU's opponents won at least seven games. They had played only one ranked opponent all season, preseason #3 Pittsburgh, a team that would finish 3–7–1 and unranked. No other team in the WAC was even close to being their equal; the Cougars were the only team in the league with fewer than four overall losses. In the end, BYU was ranked number one in both major final polls, the AP Poll and the Coaches Poll. The team was named national champion by NCAA-designated major selectors of AP, Billingsley, Football Research, FW, National Football Foundation, Poling, UPI, and USA/CNN, while named co-champion by both National Championship Foundation and Sagarin (ELO-Chess).

To date, the 1984 Cougars are the last team from outside a "power conference" to win a national title. It is widely believed that the various systems devised over the years with a view toward deciding the national championship on the field, with their emphasis on strength of schedule, make it extremely difficult for a team outside the power conferences to be considered for championship contention.

== Schedule ==
Date	Opponent	Rank	Site	TV	Result	Attendance	Source
September 1	at No. 3 Pittsburgh*		Pitt Stadium; Pittsburgh, PA	ESPN	W 20–14	40,263	
September 8	Baylor*	No. 13	Cougar Stadium; Provo, UT		W 47–13	63,705	
September 15	Tulsa*	No. 8	Cougar Stadium; Provo, UT		W 38–15	64,237	
September 22	at Hawaii	No. 6	Aloha Stadium; Halawa, HI		W 18–13	50,000	
October 6	at Colorado State	No. 7	Hughes Stadium; Fort Collins, CO		W 52–9	28,671	
October 13	Wyoming^{†}	No. 5	Cougar Stadium; Provo, UT		W 41–38	64,839	
October 20	at Air Force	No. 7	Falcon Stadium; Colorado Springs, CO	ABC	W 30–25	30,469	
October 25	at New Mexico	No. 5	University Stadium; Albuquerque, NM	ESPN	W 48–0	19,227	
November 3	UTEP	No. 4	Cougar Stadium; Provo, UT		W 42–9	62,530	
November 10	San Diego State	No. 4	Cougar Stadium; Provo, UT		W 34–3	64,050	
November 17	at Utah	No. 3	Robert Rice Stadium; Salt Lake City, UT (Holy War)	KUTV	W 24–14	36,110	
November 24	Utah State*	No. 1	Cougar Stadium; Provo, UT (rivalry)		W 38–13	65,580	
December 21	vs. Michigan*	No. 1	Jack Murphy Stadium; San Diego, CA (Holiday Bowl)	ESPN	W 24–17	61,243	
*Non-conference game; ^{†}Homecoming; Rankings from AP Poll released prior to the game

== Rankings ==
Ranking movements Legend: ██ Increase in ranking ██ Decrease in ranking — = Not ranked ( ) = First-place votes
	Week															
Poll	Pre	1	2	3	4	5	6	7	8	9	10	11	12	13	14	Final
AP	—	13	8 (1)	6	8	7	5	7	5 (3)	4 (4)	4	3 (11)	1 (40)	1 (34)	1 (33)	1 (38)
Coaches	—	12	6 (1)	4	8	6	5	5 (1)	4 (1)	3 (5)	4 (4)	3 (12)	1 (30)	1 (21)	1 (24)	1 (28)

== Game summaries ==
=== At No. 3 Pittsburgh ===
Team	1	2	3	4	Total
• Cougars	0	3	6	11	20
No. 3 Panthers	0	0	14	0	14

- Date: September 1
- Location: Pitt Stadium, Pittsburgh, Pennsylvania
- Game start: 1:30 p.m. MDT / 3:30 p.m. EDT
- Game attendance: 40,263
- Game weather: Overcast, 73 °F (23 °C)
- TV announcers (ESPN): Jim Thacker (play-by-play) and Irv Brown (analyst)

Scoring summary
2		BYU	Lee Johnson 37-yard field goal	BYU 3–0
3		Pitt	Bill Callahan 78-yard interception return (kick)	Pitt 7–3
3	11:35	Pitt	Marc Bailey 1-yard run (kick)	Pitt 14–3
3		BYU	Lakai Heimuli 12-yard run (pass failed)	Pitt 14–9
4		BYU	Lee Johnson 23-yard field goal	Pitt 14–12
4	1:37	BYU	Adam Haysbert 50-yard pass from Robbie Bosco (Bosco run)	BYU 20–14

Team	Category	Player	Statistics
BYU	Passing	Robbie Bosco	25/43, 325 yards, TD, 2 INT
BYU	Rushing	Lakei Heimuli	8 rushes, 44 yards, TD
BYU	Receiving	Adam Haysbert	9 receptions, 141 yards, TD
Pittsburgh	Passing	John Congemi	17/32, 171 yards, 2 INT
Pittsburgh	Rushing	Marc Bailey	14 rushes, 40 yards, TD
Pittsburgh	Receiving	Bill Wallace	7 receptions, 68 yards

=== Baylor ===
Team	1	2	3	4	Total
Bears	7	0	0	6	13
• No. 13 Cougars	21	13	7	6	47

- Date: September 8
- Location: Cougar Stadium, Provo, Utah
- Game attendance: 63,705
- Game weather: Clear, 79 °F (26 °C)

Scoring summary
1	BYU	Glen Kozlowski 2-yard pass from Robbie Bosco (kick blocked)	BYU 6–0
1	BYU	David Mills 39-yard pass from Robbie Bosco (Glen Kozlowski pass from Robbie Bosco)	BYU 14–0
1	Baylor	Glenn Pruitt 28-yard pass from Tom Muecke (Jim Mueller kick)	BYU 14–7
1	BYU	Glen Kozlowski 10-yard pass from Robbie Bosco (Lee Johnson kick)	BYU 21–7
2	BYU	Kelly Smith 2-yard pass from Robbie Bosco (Lee Johnson kick)	BYU 28–7
2	BYU	Kelly Smith 23-yard pass from Robbie Bosco (kick blocked)	BYU 34–7
3	BYU	David Mills 15-yard pass from Robbie Bosco (Lee Johnson kick)	BYU 41–7
4	Baylor	Ralph Stockemer 1-yard run (pass failed)	BYU 41–13
4	BYU	Fred Whittingham 1-yard run (kick failed)	BYU 47–13

Team	Category	Player	Statistics
Baylor	Passing	Cody Carlson	15/25, 198 yards, 2 INT
Baylor	Rushing	Ron Francis	13 rushes, 32 yards
Baylor	Receiving	Glenn Pruitt	6 receptions, 129 yards, TD
BYU	Passing	Robbie Bosco	28/43, 363 yards, 6 TD
BYU	Rushing	Robert Parker	11 rushes, 131 yards
BYU	Receiving	David Mills	6 receptions, 115 yards, 2 TD

=== Tulsa ===
Team	1	2	3	4	Total
Golden Hurricane	0	6	3	6	15
• No. 8 Cougars	14	7	3	14	38

- Date: September 15
- Location: Cougar Stadium, Provo, Utah
- Game attendance: 64,327
- Game weather: Clear, 85 °F (29 °C)

Scoring summary
1	BYU	Vai Sikahema 89-yard punt return (Lee Johnson kick)	BYU 7–0
1	BYU	David Mills 7-yard pass from Robbie Bosco (Lee Johnson kick)	BYU 14–0
2	BYU	Lakei Heimuli (Lee Johnson kick)	BYU 21–0
2	Tulsa	Jason Staurovsky 32-yard field goal	BYU 21–3
2	Tulsa	Jason Staurovsky 30-yard field goal	BYU 21–6
3	BYU	Lee Johnson 25-yard field goal	BYU 24–6
3	Tulsa	Jason Staurovsky 46-yard field goal	BYU 24–9
4	BYU	Robbie Bosco 33-yard run (Lee Johnson kick)	BYU 31–9
4	Tulsa	Ronnie Kelley 4-yard pass from Steve Gage (pass failed)	BYU 31–15
4	BYU	Robbie Parker 3-yard run (Lee Johnson kick)	BYU 38–15

Team	Category	Player	Statistics
Tulsa	Passing	Steve Gage	5/15, 66 yards, 2 INT
Tulsa	Rushing	Gordon Brown	16 rushes, 120 yards
Tulsa	Receiving	Ronnie Kelley	4 receptions, 56 yards
BYU	Passing	Robbie Bosco	22/33, 314 yards, TD
BYU	Rushing	Robbie Bosco	7 rushes, 21 yards, TD
BYU	Receiving	Mark Bellini	6 receptions, 141 yards

=== At Hawaii ===
Team	1	2	3	4	Total
• No. 6 Cougars	3	9	0	6	18
Rainbow Warriors	0	10	0	3	13

- Date: September 22
- Location: Aloha Stadium
  Halawa, Hawaii
- Game attendance: 50,000
- Game weather: Clear, 78 °F (26 °C)

Scoring summary
1	BYU	Johnson 46 yard field goal	BYU 3–0
2	BYU	Johnson 36 yard field goal	BYU 6–0
2	BYU	Kel. Smith 4 yard run (pass failed)	BYU 12–0
2	HAW	Aguiar recovered blocked punt in end zone (Spelman kick)	BYU 12–7
2	HAW	Spelman 33 yard field goal	BYU 12–10
4	HAW	Spelman 17 yard field goal	HAW 13–12
4	BYU	Kozlowski 25 yard pass from Bosco (pass failed)	BYU 18–13

Team	Category	Player	Statistics
BYU	Passing	Robbie Bosco	18/33, 264 yards, TD, INT
BYU	Rushing	Lakei Heimuli	16 rushes, 86 yards
BYU	Receiving	Glen Kozlowski	9 receptions, 156 yards, TD
Hawaii	Passing	Raphel Cherry	8/24, 74 yards, INT
Hawaii	Rushing	Nuu Faaola	11 rushes, 51 yards
Hawaii	Receiving	Kyle Mosley	1 reception, 62 yards

=== At Colorado State ===
Team	1	2	3	4	Total
• No. 7 Cougars	21	17	7	7	52
Rams	3	0	0	6	9

- Date: October 6
- Location: Hughes Stadium
  Fort Collins, Colorado
- Game attendance: 28,671
- Game weather: Sunny, 64 °F (18 °C)

Scoring summary
1	BYU	Lakei Leimuli 7-yard run (Lee Johnson kick)	BYU 7–0
1	BYU	Kelly Smith 40-yard run (Lee Johnson kick)	BYU 14–0
1	BYU	Kelly Smith 41-yard pass from Robbie Bosco (Lee Johnson kick)	BYU 21–0
1	CSU	Steve DeLine 32-yard field goal	BYU 21–3
2	BYU	Robbie Bosco 2-yard run (Lee Johnson kick)	BYU 28–3
2	BYU	Kelly Smith 8-yard pass from Robbie Bosco (Lee Johnson kick)	BYU 35–3
2	BYU	Lee Johnson 38-yard field goal	BYU 38–3
3	BYU	Robert Parker 28-yard run (Lee Johnson kick)	BYU 45–3
4	BYU	Richard Orr 17-yard pass from Blaine Fowler	BYU 52–3
4	CSU	Bill Sherman 5-yard pass from Rod Trumper (pass failed)	BYU 52–9

Team	Category	Player	Statistics
BYU	Passing	Robbie Bosco	16/21, 246 yards, 2 TD
BYU	Rushing	Lakei Heimuli	19 rushes, 87 yards, TD
BYU	Receiving	Kelly Smith	6 receptions, 93 yards, 2 TD
Colorado State	Passing	Tom Thenell	9/28, 98 yards, INT
Colorado State	Rushing	Kurt Lichty	6 rushes, 24 yards
Colorado State	Receiving	Todd Tyrell	4 receptions, 37 yards

=== Wyoming ===
Team	1	2	3	4	Total
Cowboys	7	13	18	0	38
• No. 5 Cougars	14	7	12	8	41

- Date: October 13
- Location: Cougar Stadium, Provo, Utah
- Game attendance: 64,839
- Game weather: Cloudy, 62 °F (17 °C)

Scoring summary
1	BYU	David Mills 44-yard pass from Robbie Bosco (Lee Johnson kick)	BYU 7–0
1	BYU	Kelly Smith 6-yard run (Lee Johnson kick)	BYU 14–0
1	Wyo	Allyn Griffin 64-yard pass from Kevin Lowe (Andrew Cottingham kick)	BYU 14–7
2	BYU	Mark Bellini 9-yard pass from Robbie Bosco (Lee Johnson kick)	BYU 21–7
2	Wyo	Allyn Griffin 37-yard pass from Scott Runyan (Andrew Cottingham kick)	BYU 21–14
2	Wyo	Oliver Davis 77-yard punt return (kick failed)	BYU 21–20
3	Wyo	Dave Evans 14-yard run (pass failed)	Wyo 26–21
3	BYU	Lakei Heimuli 8-yard pass from Robbie Bosco (pass failed)	BYU 27–26
3	Wyo	Jeff Westphal 1-yard run (pass failed)	Wyo 32–27
3	BYU	David Mills 31-yard pass from Robbie Bosco (pass failed)	BYU 33–32
3	Wyo	Kevin Lowe 61-yard run (pass failed)	Wyo 38–33
4	BYU	David Mills 14-yard pass from Robbie Bosco (David Mills pass from Robbie Bosco)	BYU 41–38

Team	Category	Player	Statistics
Wyoming	Passing	Scott Runyan	10/13, 179 yards, TD
Wyoming	Rushing	Kevin Lowe	9 rushes, 93 yards, TD
Wyoming	Receiving	Allyn Griffin	6 receptions, 148 yards, 2 TD
BYU	Passing	Robbie Bosco	29/44, 384 yards, 5 TD
BYU	Rushing	Kelly Smith	13 rushes, 92 yards, TD
BYU	Receiving	David Mills	7 receptions, 136 yards, 3 TD

External videos
- Second half broadcast (partial)

=== At Air Force ===
Team	1	2	3	4	Total
• No. 7 Cougars	7	7	13	3	30
Falcons	7	2	10	6	25

- Date: October 20
- Location: Falcon Stadium
  Colorado Springs, Colorado
- Game attendance: 30,469
- Game weather: Overcast, periods of snow; 36 °F (2 °C)
- Television network: ABC

Scoring summary
1	AF	Jody Simmons 2-yard run (Carlos Mateos kick)	Air Force 7–0
1	BYU	Mark Bellini 52-yard pass from Robbie Bosco (Lee Johnson kick)	Tied 7–7
2	AF	Safety, Mike Chandler tackled Robbie Bosco in end zone	Air Force 9–7
2	BYU	Glen Kozlowski 22-yard pass from Robbie Bosco (Lee Johnson kick)	BYU 14–9
3	BYU	Kelly Smith 56-yard pass from Robbie Bosco (Lee Johnson kick)	BYU 21–9
3	AF	Kevin Fleming 57-yard pass from Bart Weiss (Carlos Mateos kick)	BYU 21–16
3	AF	Carlos Mateos 46-yard field goal	BYU 21–19
3	BYU	David Mills 54-yard pass from Robbie Bosco (kick failed)	BYU 27–19
4	AF	Bart Weiss 2-yard run (run failed)	BYU 27–25
4	BYU	Lee Johnson 27-yard field goal	BYU 30–25

Team	Category	Player	Statistics
BYU	Passing	Robbie Bosco	28/41, 484 yards, 4 TD, INT
BYU	Rushing	Lakei Heimuli	18 rushes, 65 yards
BYU	Receiving	David Mills	10 receptions, 225 yards, TD
Air Force	Passing	Bart Weiss	6/10, 152 yards, TD
Air Force	Rushing	Pat Evans	20 rushes, 103 yards
Air Force	Receiving	Kevin Fleming	1 reception, 57 yards, TD

=== At New Mexico ===
Team	1	2	3	4	Total
• No. 5 Cougars	7	17	24	0	48
Lobos	0	0	0	0	0

- Date: October 25
- Location: University Stadium
- Game attendance: 19,277
- Game weather: Mostly cloudy; 50 °F (10 °C)
- Television network: ESPN

Scoring summary
1	BYU	Glen Kozlowski 7-yard pass from Robbie Bosco (Lee Johnson kick)	BYU 7–0
2	BYU	Lee Johnson 17-yard field goal	BYU 10–0
2	BYU	Vai Sikahema 47-yard punt return (Lee Johnson kick)	BYU 17–0
2	BYU	Lakei Heimuli 2-yard run (Lee Johnson kick)	BYU 24–0
3	BYU	Lakei Heimuli 33-yard run (Lee Johnson kick)	BYU 31–0
3	BYU	Lee Johnson 47-yard field goal	BYU 34–0
3	BYU	Glen Kozlowski 10-yard pass from Robbie Bosco (Lee Johnson kick)	BYU 41–0
3	BYU	Glen Kozlowski 3-yard pass from Robbie Bosco (Pete Rossi kick)	BYU 48–0

Team	Category	Player	Statistics
BYU	Passing	Robbie Bosco	19/29, 227 yards, 3 TD
BYU	Rushing	Lakei Heimuli	19 rushes, 141 yards, 2 TD
BYU	Receiving	Kelly Smith	3 receptions, 54 yards
New Mexico	Passing	Billy Rucker	5/8, 69 yards, INT
New Mexico	Rushing	Willie Turral	13 rushes, 48 yards
New Mexico	Receiving	Kenne Whitehead	5 receptions, 37 yards

=== UTEP ===
Team	1	2	3	4	Total
Miners	0	3	0	6	9
• No. 4 Cougars	14	7	21	0	42

- Date: November 3
- Location: Cougar Stadium, Provo, Utah
- Game attendance: 62,350
- Game weather: 54 °F (12 °C), Mostly cloudy

Scoring summary
1	BYU	Glen Kozlowski 24-yard pass from Robbie Bosco (Lee Johnson kick)	BYU 7–0
1	BYU	Adam Haysbert 4-yard pass from Robbie Bosco (Lee Johnson kick)	BYU 14–0
2	BYU	Mark Bellini 11-yard pass from Robbie Bosco (Lee Johnson kick)	BYU 21–0
2	UTEP	Hugo Castellanos 27-yard field goal	BYU 21–3
3	BYU	Lakei Heimuli 13-yard run (Lee Johnson kick)	BYU 28–3
3	BYU	Kelly Smith 12-yard run (Lee Johnson kick)	BYU 35–3
3	BYU	Adam Haysbert 6-yard pass from Robbie Bosco (Lee Johnson kick)	BYU 42–3
4	UTEP	Robert Moore 3-yard run (pass failed)	BYU 42–9

Team	Category	Player	Statistics
UTEP	Passing	Kevin Ward	6/13, 60 yards
UTEP	Rushing	James Rose	22 rushes, 102 yards
UTEP	Receiving	Larry Linne	3 receptions, 41 yards
BYU	Passing	Robbie Bosco	19/31, 237 yards, 4 TD, INT
BYU	Rushing	Kelly Smith	4 receptions, 106 yards, TD
BYU	Receiving	Glen Kozlowski	3 receptions, 75 yards, TD

=== San Diego State ===
Team	1	2	3	4	Total
Aztecs	3	0	0	0	3
• No. 4 Cougars	14	10	3	7	34

- Date: November 3
- Location: Cougar Stadium, Provo, Utah
- Game attendance: 64,050
- Game weather: 45 °F (7 °C), Overcast

Scoring summary
1	SDSU	Chris O'Brien 27-yard field goal	SDSU 3–0
1	BYU	Glen Kozlowski 17-yard pass from Robbie Bosco (Lee Johnson kick)	BYU 7–3
1	BYU	Kelly Smith 40-yard run (Lee Johnson kick)	BYU 14–3
2	BYU	Lakei Heimuli 2-yard run (Lee Johnson kick)	BYU 21–3
2	BYU	Lee Johnson 42-yard field goal	BYU 24–3
3	BYU	Lee Johnson 32-yard field goal	BYU 27–3
4	BYU	Glen Kozlowski 9-yard pass from Robbie Bosco (Lee Johnson kick)	BYU 34–3

Team	Category	Player	Statistics
San Diego State	Passing	Todd Santos	7/19, 65 yards, 3 INT
San Diego State	Rushing	Mike Waters	17 rushes, 66 yards
San Diego State	Receiving	Webster Slaughter	6 receptions, 44 yards
BYU	Passing	Robbie Bosco	24/44, 326 yards, 2 TD, 2 INT
BYU	Rushing	Kelly Smith	7 rushes, 61 yards, TD
BYU	Receiving	Glen Kozlowski	6 receptions, 108 yards, 2 TD

=== At Utah ===
BYU at Utah

Team	1	2	3	4	Total
• No. 3 Cougars	7	3	7	7	24
Utes	7	0	7	0	14

- Date: November 17
- Location: Robert Rice Stadium, Salt Lake City
- Game attendance: 36,110
- Game weather: Clear; 47 °F (8 °C)

Scoring summary
1	8:54	UTAH	Moloani Hola 1 yard run (Andre Guardi kick)	Utah 7–0
1	2:41	BYU	Adam Haysbert 11 yard pass from Robbie Bosco (Lee Johnson kick)	Tied 7–7
2	0:02	BYU	Lee Johnson 19 yard field goal	BYU 10–7
3	8:11	BYU	Glen Kozlowski 19 yard pass from Robbie Bosco (Lee Johnson kick)	BYU 17–7
3	1:35	UTAH	Thomas Beard 11 yard pass from Mark Stevens (Andre Guardi kick)	BYU 17–14
4	7:26	BYU	Kelly Smith 4 yard pass from Robbie Bosco (Lee Johnson kick)	BYU 24–14

Team	Category	Player	Statistics
BYU	Passing	Robbie Bosco	27/44, 367 yards, 3 TD, 3 INT
BYU	Rushing	Lakei Heimuli	17 rushes, 117 yards
BYU	Receiving	Glen Kozlowski	8 receptions, 162 yards, TD
Utah	Passing	Mark Stevens	12/24, 152 yards, TD
Utah	Rushing	Eddie Johnson	14 rushes, 61 yards
Utah	Receiving	Don Woodward	2 receptions, 53 yards

=== Utah State ===
Team	1	2	3	4	Total
Aggies	0	7	6	0	13
• No. 1 Cougars	10	7	7	14	38

- Date: November 24
- Location: Cougar Stadium, Provo, Utah
- Game attendance: 65,508
- Game weather: 50 °F (10 °C), Partly cloudy

Scoring summary
1	BYU	Lakei Heimuli 8-yard run (Lee Johnson kick)	BYU 7–0
1	BYU	Lee Johnson 22-yard field goal	BYU 10–0
2	BYU	Vai Sikahema 2-yard run (Lee Johnson kick)	BYU 17–0
2	USU	Tracy Duckworth 3-yard pass from Gym Kimball (Willie Beecher kick)	BYU 17–7
3	USU	Willie Beecher 26-yard field goal	BYU 17–10
3	BYU	Mark Bellini 19-yard pass from Robbie Bosco (Lee Johnson kick)	BYU 24–10
3	USU	Willie Beecher 46-yard field goal	BYU 24–13
4	BYU	Lakei Heimuli 4-yard run (Lee Johnson kick)	BYU 31–13
4	BYU	Vai Sikahema 26-yard run (Lee Johnson kick)	BYU 38–13

Team	Category	Player	Statistics
Utah State	Passing	Gym Campbell	18/54, 274 yards, TD, 2 INT
Utah State	Rushing	Marc White	7 rushes, 53 yards
Utah State	Receiving	Solomon Miller	4 receptions, 92 yards
BYU	Passing	Robbie Bosco	28/52, 338 yards, TD, INT
BYU	Rushing	Vai Sikahema	5 rushes, 59 yards, 2 TD
BYU	Receiving	David Mills	7 receptions, 92 yards

=== Vs. Michigan (Holiday Bowl) ===
Team	1	2	3	4	Total
Wolverines	0	7	7	3	17
• No. 1 Cougars	0	10	0	14	24

- Date: December 21
- Location: Jack Murphy Stadium
- Game attendance: 61,243
- Game weather: Clear; 51 °F (11 °C)
- Television network: ESPN
- Source: CougarStats.com

Scoring summary
2	BYU	Kel. Smith 5 yard run (Johnson kick)	BYU 7–0
2	MICH	Rogers 5 yard run (Bergeron kick)	Tied 7–7
2	BYU	Johnson 31 yard field goal	BYU 10–7
3	MICH	Perryman 10 yard pass from Zurbrugg (Bergeron kick)	MICH 14–10
4	MICH	Bergeron 32 yard field goal	MICH 17–10
4	BYU	Kozlowski 7 yard pass from Bosco (Johnson kick)	Tie 17–17
4	BYU	Kel. Smith 13 yard pass from Bosco (Johnson kick)	BYU 24–17

Team	Category	Player	Statistics
Michigan	Passing	Chris Zurbrugg	7/14, 82 yards, TD, INT
Michigan	Rushing	Bob Perryman	13 rushes, 110 yards
Michigan	Receiving	Vincent Bean	3 receptions, 46 yards
BYU	Passing	Robbie Bosco	30/42, 343 yards, 2 TD, 3 INT
BYU	Rushing	Lakei Heimuli	16 rushes, 82 yards
BYU	Receiving	David Mills	11 receptions, 103 yards

== Personnel ==
1984 BYU Cougars football team roster
Players
Coaches
Offense

Pos.	#	Name	Class
G, C	57	Robert Anae	Sr
WR	11	Mark Bellini	So
OL	71	John Borgia	Fr
QB	6	Robbie Bosco	Jr
RB	28	Paul Crawford	Sr
WR	18	Jim Edwards	So
QB	16	Blaine Fowler	Jr
OL	75	David Futrell	Fr
OL	59	Craig Garrick	Sr
WR	1	Adam Haysbert	Sr
RB	35	Lakei Heimuli	So
OL	68	John Hunter	Fr
OL	66	David King	So
WR	7	Glen Kozlowski	Jr
TE	90	Lance Lindley	Jr
QB	8	Steve Lindsley	Fr
OL	73	Chris Matau	So
C	50	Trevor Matich	Sr
OL	67	Keith McCullough	Jr
WR	26	David Miles	Fr
TE	12	David Mills	Sr
TE	94	Trevor Molini	So
WR	85	Scott Norberg	Jr
OL	75	Sam Oramas	Sr
WR	19	Richard Orr	Jr
HB	43	Robert Parker	So
OL	61	Doug Rawlinson	Fr
OL	63	Randy Rawlinson	Jr
OL	69	Scott Robinson	Jr
OL	55	Brian Rondoni	Fr
FB	33	Thor Salanoa	So
OL	56	Jay Shumway	So
HB	23	Vai Sikahema	Jr
HB	21	Kelly Smith	Jr
OL	60	David Tidwell	Jr
HB	46	Tom Tuipulotu	Fr
TE	89	Brett Varoz	Sr
FB	33	Freddie Whittingham	Fr
OL	70	Louis Wong	Sr
OL	78	David Wright	Jr
QB	12	Mike Young	Fr

Defense

Pos.	#	Name	Class
LB	51	Ladd Akeo	So
DB	22	Mark Allen	Sr
LB	49	Marv Allen	Sr
LB	31	John Bechtold	So
LB	37	Alema Fitisemanu	Fr
LB	34	Kurt Gouveia	Jr
DL	78	Larry Hamilton	Sr
DB	42	Steve Haymond	Sr
DB	2	Brian Hazelgren	Jr
DE	92	Jim Herrmann	Sr
LB	57	Richard Hobbs	Fr
DL	96	Jay Huckaby	Fr
DL	77	Shawn Knight	So
DL	76	Tim Knight	So
DB	9	Rob Ledenko	Fr
DL	80	Ty Mattingly	So
LB	44	Jim McDade	Jr
LB	96	Jay McDonald	Jr
DB	5	Kyle Morrell	Sr
LB	55	David Neff	Sr
DB	27	Kory Rasmussen	So
LB	59	Steve Sanders	So
DB	5	Marc Sherman	Jr
DB	24	Shane Shumway	So
DL	76	Brad Smith	Sr
DL	65	Ken Smith	Sr
DB	25	Jeff Sprowls	Jr
DB	3	Rodney Thomas	Fr
LB	9	JC VonCollin	Fr
LB	41	Leon White	Jr
LB	53	Cary Whittingham	Jr
DB	14	Jeff Wilcox	So

Special teams

Pos.	#	Name	Class
P, PK	10	Lee Johnson	Sr
PK	3	Pete Rossi	Sr
PK	15	Gary Webster	Jr

Head coach

- LaVell Edwards

Coordinators/assistant coaches

- Roger French
  Offensive coordinator/Offensive line
- Dick Felt
  Defensive coordinator/Defensive backs
- Norm Chow
  Wide receivers/Recruiting coordinator
- Mike Holmgren
  Quarterbacks
- Mel Olson
  Offensive line/Academic coordinator
- Jim Paronto
  Inside linebackers
- Tom Ramage
  Special teams coordinator/Defensive line
- Lance Reynolds
  Running backs
- Ken Schmidt
  Outside linebackers
- Bart Andrus
  Graduate assistant

Legend

- (C) Team captain
- (S) Suspended
- (I) Ineligible
- Injured
- Redshirt

Roster
Last update: January 1, 2017

== Awards and honors ==
- Robbie Bosco, Sammy Baugh Trophy
- LaVell Edwards, Paul "Bear" Bryant Award

== Draft picks ==
The following were selected in the 1985 NFL draft.

Player	Position	Round	Overall	NFL team
Trevor Matich	Center	1	28	New England Patriots
Kyle Morrell	Cornerback	4	106	Minnesota Vikings
Louis Wong	Guard	5	131	St. Louis Cardinals
Lee Johnson	Punter	5	138	Houston Oilers
Jim Herrmann	Defensive end	7	184	Dallas Cowboys
