= Kyle Morrell =

American football player (1963–2020)

No. 35
- Position: Defensive back

Personal information
- Born: October 9, 1963; Scottsdale, Arizona, U.S.
- Died: November 15, 2020 (aged 57); Bountiful, Utah, U.S.
- Listed height: 6 ft 1 in (1.85 m)
- Listed weight: 190 lb (86 kg)

Career information
- High school: Viewmont (Bountiful)
- College: BYU
- NFL draft: 1985: 4th round, 106th overall pick

Career history
- Minnesota Vikings (1986); Indianapolis Colts (1987)*
- * Offseason or practice squad member only

Awards and highlights
- National champion (1984); First-team All-American (1984); WAC Defensive Player of the Year (1984)
- Stats at Pro Football Reference

Kyle Douglas Morrell (October 9, 1963 – November 15, 2020) was an American professional football player who was a defensive back in the National Football League (NFL).

Morrell was born in Scottsdale, Arizona and played scholastically at Viewmont High School in Bountiful, Utah. He played collegiately for the BYU Cougars, where, as a senior, he was a member of their 1984 consensus national champion team. He was also honored his senior year by the Associated Press, as a first-team All-American.

Morrell was selected by the Minnesota Vikings in the fourth round of the 1985 NFL draft, but spent the year on the injured reserve list. He appeared in five games for the Vikings in 1986.

Morrell died on November 15, 2020, in Bountiful, from Amyotrophic lateral sclerosis (ALS).
