= Trevor Matich =

American football player and analyst (born 1961)

No. 64, 61, 46
- Position: Long snapper

Personal information
- Born: October 9, 1961 (age 65); Washington, D.C., U.S.
- Listed height: 6 ft 4 in (1.93 m)
- Listed weight: 300 lb (136 kg)

Career information
- High school: Rio Americano (Sacramento, California)
- College: Brigham Young
- NFL draft: 1985: 1st round, 28th overall pick

Career history
- New England Patriots (1985–1988); Detroit Lions (1989); New York Jets (1990–1991); Indianapolis Colts (1992–1993); Washington Redskins (1994–1996)

Awards and highlights
- National champion (1984); Third-team All-American (1984); First-team All-WAC (1984)

Career NFL statistics
- Games played: 148
- Games started: 23
- Fumble recoveries: 1
- Stats at Pro Football Reference

Trevor Anthony Matich (born October 9, 1961) is an American football analyst and former long snapper in the National Football League (NFL) from 1985 through 1996.

== Early life ==
Matich grew up in Sacramento, California. He did not become a starter on his high school football team until he was a senior.

== College career ==
Matich played college football at Brigham Young University where he was a two-time all-conference offensive lineman in the Western Athletic Conference. As a member of the Church of Jesus Christ of Latter-day Saints, he went on a mission to Torreón in Mexico after his second season at BYU. After returning, he helped the team win the 1984 NCAA football championship as their starting center. In his four seasons at BYU (1979–80 and 1983–84), the Cougars posted a combined 47–3 record; Matich snapped to four different All-American quarterbacks during that span, and is the only college football center in history to do so: Marc Wilson, Jim McMahon, Steve Young, and Robbie Bosco.

== Professional career ==
He was drafted by the New England Patriots in the first round of the 1985 NFL draft with the 28th overall pick. He injured his ankle in his first game as a rookie and missed the rest of the season. After four seasons with the Patriots, he went on to play for the Detroit Lions, New York Jets, Indianapolis Colts and Washington Redskins. In all, he played in the NFL for 12 seasons, mainly as a long snapper. While playing for the Indianapolis Colts (1992–1993), he was nicknamed the "Hardest Working Man in Pro Football" due to his constant practicing and warming up on the sidelines.

== Broadcasting career ==
After his playing career was over, Matich briefly served as a color analyst for Fox Sports' NFL coverage and then at CBS for a year. He has appeared as a Washington Redskins studio analyst for their pregame and postgame shows and has won eight Emmys for his work. He currently is employed by ESPN, primarily working on ESPN's College Football coverage along with appearances on SportsCenter.
