= 1984 Air Force Falcons football team =

American college football season

1984 Air Force Falcons football
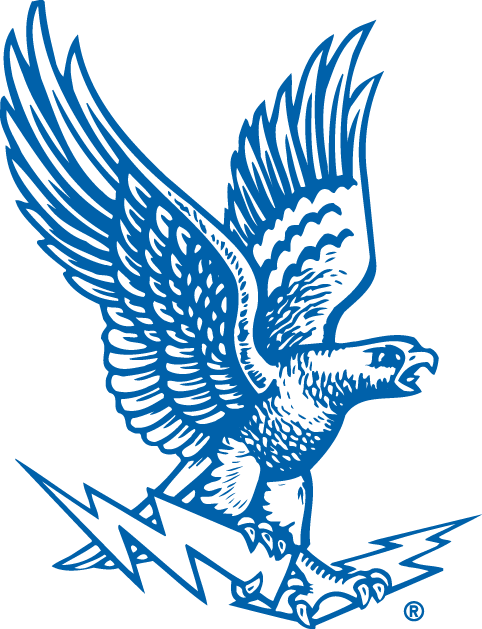

Independence Bowl champion

Independence Bowl, W 23–7 vs. Virginia Tech
- Conference: Western Athletic Conference
- Record: 8–4 (4–3 WAC)
- Head coach: Fisher DeBerry (1st season)
- Offensive scheme: Wishbone triple option
- Captain: All seniors
- Home stadium: Falcon Stadium

1984 Western Athletic Conference football standings
	Conf.					Overall
Team	W		L		T	W		L		T
No. 1 BYU $	8	–	0	–	0	13	–	0	–	0
Hawaii	5	–	2	–	0	7	–	4	–	0
Air Force	4	–	3	–	0	8	–	4	–	0
Utah	4	–	3	–	1	6	–	5	–	1
San Diego State	4	–	3	–	1	4	–	7	–	1
Wyoming	4	–	4	–	0	6	–	6	–	0
Colorado State	3	–	5	–	0	3	–	8	–	0
New Mexico	1	–	7	–	0	4	–	8	–	0
UTEP	1	–	7	–	0	2	–	9	–	0
$ – Conference champion; Rankings from AP Poll

The 1984 Air Force Falcons football team represented the United States Air Force Academy in the Western Athletic Conference (WAC) during the 1984 NCAA Division I-A football season. Led by first-year head coach Fisher DeBerry, Air Force played its home games at Falcon Stadium in Colorado Springs and finished the regular season at 7–4 (4–3 in WAC, third). The Falcons were again invited to the Independence Bowl and defeated Virginia Tech 23–7.

Previously the offensive coordinator, DeBerry was promoted in late December 1983, and was the Falcons' head coach for 23 seasons.

== Schedule ==
Date	Opponent	Site	Result	Attendance	Source
September 1	San Diego State	Falcon Stadium; Colorado Springs, CO	W 34–16	36,553	
September 8	Northern Colorado*	Falcon Stadium; Colorado Springs, CO	W 75–7	28,621	
September 15	at Wyoming	War Memorial Stadium; Laramie, WY	L 20–26	31,487	
September 22	at Utah	Robert Rice Stadium; Salt Lake City, UT	L 17–28	30,610	
September 29	Colorado State	Falcon Stadium; Colorado Springs, CO (rivalry)	W 52–10	27,806	
October 6	Navy*	Falcon Stadium; Colorado Springs, CO (Commander-in-Chief's Trophy)	W 29–22	29,349	
October 13	at Notre Dame*	Notre Dame Stadium; South Bend, IN (rivalry)	W 21–7	59,075	
October 20	No. 7 BYU	Falcon Stadium; Colorado Springs, CO	L 25–30	30,469	
November 3	at Army*	Michie Stadium; West Point, NY (Commander-in-Chief's Trophy)	L 12–24		
November 10	at New Mexico	University Stadium; Albuquerque, NM	W 23–9	17,481	
November 17	at UTEP	Sun Bowl; El Paso, TX	W 38–12	10,210	
December 15	vs. Virginia Tech*	Independence Stadium; Shreveport, LA (Independence Bowl)	W 23–7	41,100	
*Non-conference game; Rankings from AP Poll released prior to the game

== Roster ==
1984 Air Force Falcons football team roster
Players
Coaches
Offense

Pos.	#	Name	Class
QB	4	Bart Weiss	Jr
TE	87	Chad Hennings	Fr

Defense

Pos.	#	Name	Class
DL	96	Chris Funk	Sr
DL	50	Steve Kelly	Sr
DL	62	Larry Nicklas	Sr
DL	74	John Ziegler	Jr
LB		Terry Maki	So
CB		Tom Rotello	So
S	29	Scott Thomas	Jr

Special teams

Pos.	#	Name	Class
P	39	Mark Simon	So

Head coach

- Fisher DeBerry (1st year)

Coordinators/assistant coaches

Legend

- (C) Team captain
- (S) Suspended
- (I) Ineligible
- Injured
- Redshirt

== Game summaries ==
=== No. 7 BYU ===
	1	2	3	4	Total
No. 7 Cougars	7	7	13	3	30
Falcons	7	2	10	6	25

Team	Category	Player	Statistics
BYU	Passing	Robbie Bosco	28/41, 484 yards, 4 TD, INT
BYU	Rushing	Lakei Heimuli	18 rushes, 65 yards
BYU	Receiving	David Mills	10 receptions, 225 yards, TD
Air Force	Passing	Bart Weiss	6/10, 152 yards, TD
Air Force	Rushing	Pat Evans	20 rushes, 103 yards
Air Force	Receiving	Kevin Fleming	1 reception, 57 yards, TD
