= 1984 San Diego State Aztecs football team =

American college football season

1984 San Diego State Aztecs football
- Conference: Western Athletic Conference
- Record: 4–7–1 (4–3–1 WAC)
- Head coach: Doug Scovil (4th season)
- Offensive scheme: West Coast
- Base defense: 4–3
- Home stadium: Jack Murphy Stadium

1984 Western Athletic Conference football standings
	Conf.					Overall
Team	W		L		T	W		L		T
No. 1 BYU $	8	–	0	–	0	13	–	0	–	0
Hawaii	5	–	2	–	0	7	–	4	–	0
Air Force	4	–	3	–	0	8	–	4	–	0
Utah	4	–	3	–	1	6	–	5	–	1
San Diego State	4	–	3	–	1	4	–	7	–	1
Wyoming	4	–	4	–	0	6	–	6	–	0
Colorado State	3	–	5	–	0	3	–	8	–	0
New Mexico	1	–	7	–	0	4	–	8	–	0
UTEP	1	–	7	–	0	2	–	9	–	0
$ – Conference champion; Rankings from AP Poll

The 1984 San Diego State Aztecs football team represented San Diego State University during the 1984 NCAA Division I-A football season as a member of the Western Athletic Conference (WAC).

The team was led by head coach Doug Scovil, in his fourth year, and played home games at Jack Murphy Stadium (Note: San Diego County Credit Union Stadium (SDCCU Stadium) was known as Jack Murphy Stadium from 1981 through 1997.) in San Diego, California. They finished with a record of four wins, seven losses and one tie (4–7–1, 4–3–1 WAC).

== Schedule ==
Date	Opponent	Site	Result	Attendance	Source
September 1	at Air Force	Falcon Stadium; Colorado Springs, CO	L 16–34	36,553	
September 8	No. 4 UCLA*	Jack Murphy Stadium; San Diego, CA	L 15–18	49,220	
September 15	UTEP	Jack Murphy Stadium; San Diego, CA	W 51–2	17,461	
September 22	at No. 12 Oklahoma State*	Lewis Field; Stillwater, OK	L 16–19	46,500	
October 6	at Wyoming	War Memorial Stadium; Laramie, WY	W 21–0	19,223	
October 13	Utah	Jack Murphy Stadium; San Diego, CA	T 24–24	33,549	
October 20	Colorado State^{†}	Jack Murphy Stadium; San Diego, CA	W 41–24	20,942	
October 27	at Hawaii	Aloha Stadium; Halawa, HI	L 10–16	44,107	
November 3	UNLV*	Jack Murphy Stadium; San Diego, CA	L 14–30	16,883	
November 10	at No. 4 BYU	Cougar Stadium; Provo, UT	L 3–34	64,050	
November 17	New Mexico	Jack Murphy Stadium; San Diego, CA	W 37–31	13,548	
November 24	Long Beach State*	Jack Murphy Stadium; San Diego, CA	L 17–18	10,949	
*Non-conference game; ^{†}Homecoming; Rankings from AP Poll released prior to the game

== Team players in the NFL ==
The following were selected in the 1985 NFL draft.

Player	Position	Round	Overall	NFL team
Tory Nixon	Defensive back	2	33	Washington Redskins
James Johnson	Linebacker	3	62	Detroit Lions
Rich Moran	Guard – Center	3	71	Green Bay Packers
Mike Waters	Tight end – Running back	9	235	New York Jets

The following finished their college career in 1984, were not drafted, but played in the NFL.

Player	Position	First NFL team
John O'Callaghan	Tight end	1987 Seattle Seahawks

== Team awards ==
Award	Player
Most Valuable Player (John Simcox Memorial Trophy)	Tory Nixon
Outstanding Offensive & Defensive Linemen (Byron H. Chase Memorial Trophy)	Rich Moran, Off; Mike Stevens, Def
Team captains Dr. R. Hardy / C.E. Peterson Memorial Trophy	Rich Moran, Off; Herb Brohn, Def
Most Inspirational Player	Mike Waters
