= 1984 New Mexico Lobos football team =

American college football season

1984 New Mexico Lobos football
- Conference: Western Athletic Conference
- Record: 4–8 (1–7 WAC)
- Head coach: Joe Lee Dunn (2nd season)
- Home stadium: University Stadium

1984 Western Athletic Conference football standings
	Conf.					Overall
Team	W		L		T	W		L		T
No. 1 BYU $	8	–	0	–	0	13	–	0	–	0
Hawaii	5	–	2	–	0	7	–	4	–	0
Air Force	4	–	3	–	0	8	–	4	–	0
Utah	4	–	3	–	1	6	–	5	–	1
San Diego State	4	–	3	–	1	4	–	7	–	1
Wyoming	4	–	4	–	0	6	–	6	–	0
Colorado State	3	–	5	–	0	3	–	8	–	0
New Mexico	1	–	7	–	0	4	–	8	–	0
UTEP	1	–	7	–	0	2	–	9	–	0
$ – Conference champion; Rankings from AP Poll

The 1984 New Mexico Lobos football team was an American football team that represented the University of New Mexico in the Western Athletic Conference (WAC) during the 1984 NCAA Division I-A football season. In their second season under head coach Joe Lee Dunn, the Lobos compiled a 4–8 record (1–7 against WAC opponents) and were outscored by a total of 359 to 251.

The team's statistical leaders included Buddy Funck with 922 passing yards, Willie Turral with 1,064 rushing yards and 60 points scored, and Kenneth Whitehead with 713 receiving yards.

== Schedule ==
Date	Opponent	Site	Result	Attendance	Source
September 8	New Mexico State*	University Stadium; Albuquerque, NM (Rio Grande Rivalry)	W 61–21	25,442	
September 15	West Texas State*	University Stadium; Albuquerque, NM	W 27–0	18,992	
September 22	Texas Tech*	University Stadium; Albuquerque, NM	W 29–24	24,529	
September 29	at UTEP	Sun Bowl; El Paso, TX	W 34–7	20,000	
October 5	at Utah	Robert Rice Stadium; Salt Lake City, UT	L 14–38	30,400	
October 13	Colorado State^{†}	University Stadium; Albuquerque, NM	L 10–16	23,572	
October 20	at Wyoming	War Memorial Stadium; Laramie, WY	L 21–59	11,742	
October 25	No. 5 BYU	University Stadium; Albuquerque, NM	L 0–48	19,227	
November 3	at Baylor*	Baylor Stadium; Waco, TX	L 2–38	26,000	
November 10	Air Force	University Stadium; Albuquerque, NM	L 9–23	17,481	
November 17	at San Diego State	Jack Murphy Stadium; San Diego, CA	L 31–37	13,548	
November 24	at Hawaii	Aloha Stadium; Halawa, HI	L 13–48	46,290	
*Non-conference game; ^{†}Homecoming; Rankings from AP Poll released prior to the game
