= 1984 Utah Utes football team =

American college football season

1984 Utah Utes football
- Conference: Western Athletic Conference
- Record: 6–5–1 (4–3–1 WAC)
- Head coach: Chuck Stobart (3rd season)
- Offensive coordinator: John Faiman (2nd season)
- Defensive coordinator: George Wheeler (1st season)
- Home stadium: Robert Rice Stadium

1984 Western Athletic Conference football standings
	Conf.					Overall
Team	W		L		T	W		L		T
No. 1 BYU $	8	–	0	–	0	13	–	0	–	0
Hawaii	5	–	2	–	0	7	–	4	–	0
Air Force	4	–	3	–	0	8	–	4	–	0
Utah	4	–	3	–	1	6	–	5	–	1
San Diego State	4	–	3	–	1	4	–	7	–	1
Wyoming	4	–	4	–	0	6	–	6	–	0
Colorado State	3	–	5	–	0	3	–	8	–	0
New Mexico	1	–	7	–	0	4	–	8	–	0
UTEP	1	–	7	–	0	2	–	9	–	0
$ – Conference champion; Rankings from AP Poll

The 1984 Utah Utes football team was an American football team that represented the University of Utah as a member of the Western Athletic Conference (WAC) during the 1983 NCAA Division I-A football season. In their third and final season under head coach Chuck Stobart, the Utes compiled an overall record of 6–5–1 with a mark of 4–3–1 against conference opponents, tying for fourth place in the WAC. Home games were played on campus at Robert Rice Stadium in Salt Lake City.

== Schedule ==
Date	Time	Opponent	Site	Result	Attendance	Source
September 1	7:00 pm	Weber State*	Robert Rice Stadium; Salt Lake City, UT	W 52–16	27,828	
September 8	2:00 pm	at Washington State*	Martin Stadium; Pullman, WA	L 40–42	21,000	
September 15	5:30 pm	at Tennessee*	Neyland Stadium; Knoxville, TN	L 21–27	93,077	
September 22	7:00 pm	Air Force	Robert Rice Stadium; Salt Lake City, UT	W 28–17	30,610	
September 29	1:30 pm	at Wyoming	War Memorial Stadium; Laramie, WY	L 14–21	17,055	
October 5	7:30 pm	New Mexico	Robert Rice Stadium; Salt Lake City, UT	W 38–14	30,400	
October 13	7:00 pm	at San Diego State	Jack Murphy Stadium; San Diego, CA	T 24–24	33,549	
October 20	11:30 pm	at Hawaii	Aloha Stadium; Halawa, HI	L 17–20	43,804	
October 27	1:00 pm	UTEP	Robert Rice Stadium; Salt Lake City, UT	W 43–15	17,850	
November 3	12:00 pm	Colorado State^{†}	Robert Rice Stadium; Salt Lake City, UT	W 35–23	20,019	
November 10	1:30 pm	at Utah State*	Romney Stadium; Logan, UT (Battle of the Brothers)	W 21–10	11,937	
November 17	12:00 pm	No. 3 BYU	Robert Rice Stadium; Salt Lake City, UT (Holy War)	L 14–24	36,110	
*Non-conference game; ^{†}Homecoming; Rankings from AP Poll released prior to the game; All times are in Mountain time; Source:

== Game summaries ==
=== BYU ===
Quarter	1	2	3	4	Total
BYU	7	3	7	7	24
Utah	7	0	7	0	14

at Robert Rice Stadium, Salt Lake City

- Date: November 17

Scoring summary

Quarter	Time	Drive			Team	Scoring information	Score	
Quarter	Time	Plays	Yards	TOP	Team	Scoring information	BYU	Utah
1	8:54				Utah	Molonai Hola 1-yard touchdown run, Andre Guardi kick good	0	7
1	2:41				BYU	Adam Haysbert 11-yard touchdown reception from Robbie Bosco, Lee Johnson kick good	7	7
2	:02				BYU	19-yard field goal by Lee Johnson	10	7
3	8:11				BYU	Glen Kozlowski 19-yard touchdown reception from Robbie Bosco, Lee Johnson kick good	17	7
3	1:35				Utah	Therman Beard 11-yard touchdown reception from Mark Stevens, Andre Guardi kick good	17	14
4	7:26				BYU	Kelly Smith 4-yard touchdown reception from Robbie Bosco, Lee Johnson kick good	24	14
"TOP" = time of possession. For other American football terms, see Glossary of American football.							24	14

== Roster ==
1984 Utah Utes football team roster
Players
Coaches
Offense

Pos.	#	Name	Class
QB	11	Scott Case	So
QB	7	Eric Erickson	So
WR	84	Aric Lewis	Jr
RB	33	Eddie Lewis	Jr
C	72	Kevin Reach	Jr
QB	12	Mark Stevens	Sr

Defense

Pos.	#	Name	Class
LB	44	Mark Geiselmayr	So
LB	46	Filipo Mokofisi	Jr
DL	63	Mark Reckert	Jr
DB	21	Reggie Richardson	Jr
DB	2	Erroll Tucker	Jr

Special teams

Pos.	#	Name	Class

Head coach

- Chuck Stobart

Coordinators/assistant coaches

Legend

- (C) Team captain
- (S) Suspended
- (I) Ineligible
- Injured
- Redshirt
