= 1984 UTEP Miners football team =

American college football season

1984 UTEP Miners football
- Conference: Western Athletic Conference
- Record: 2–9 (1–7 WAC)
- Head coach: Bill Yung (3rd season)
- Offensive coordinator: Hal Mumme (3rd season)
- Offensive scheme: Spread
- Defensive coordinator: Denny Doornbos (2nd season)
- Base defense: 3–4
- Home stadium: Sun Bowl

1984 Western Athletic Conference football standings
	Conf.					Overall
Team	W		L		T	W		L		T
No. 1 BYU $	8	–	0	–	0	13	–	0	–	0
Hawaii	5	–	2	–	0	7	–	4	–	0
Air Force	4	–	3	–	0	8	–	4	–	0
Utah	4	–	3	–	1	6	–	5	–	1
San Diego State	4	–	3	–	1	4	–	7	–	1
Wyoming	4	–	4	–	0	6	–	6	–	0
Colorado State	3	–	5	–	0	3	–	8	–	0
New Mexico	1	–	7	–	0	4	–	8	–	0
UTEP	1	–	7	–	0	2	–	9	–	0
$ – Conference champion; Rankings from AP Poll

The 1984 UTEP Miners football team was an American football team that represented the University of Texas at El Paso in the Western Athletic Conference during the 1984 NCAA Division I-A football season. In their third year under head coach Bill Yung, the team compiled a 2–9 record.

== Schedule ==
Date	Opponent	Site	Result	Attendance	Source
September 1	at Texas A&M*	Kyle Field; College Station, TX	L 17–20	42,658	
September 8	Idaho State*	Sun Bowl; El Paso, TX	W 16–14	35,711	
September 15	at San Diego State	Jack Murphy Stadium; San Diego, CA	L 2–51	17,461	
September 29	New Mexico	Sun Bowl; El Paso, TX	L 7–34	20,000	
October 6	at New Mexico State*	Aggie Memorial Stadium; Las Cruces, NM (rivalry)	L 16–27	32,904	
October 13	Hawaii^{†}	Sun Bowl; El Paso, TX	L 20–24	21,121	
October 27	at Utah	Robert Rice Stadium; Salt Lake City, UT	L 15–43	17,850	
November 3	at No. 4 BYU	Cougar Stadium; Provo, UT	L 9–42	62,350	
November 10	at Colorado State	Hughes Stadium; Fort Collins, CO	L 31–59	11,284	
November 17	Wyoming	Sun Bowl; El Paso, TX	W 35–22	10,121	
November 24	Air Force	Sun Bowl; El Paso, TX	L 12–38	10,210	
*Non-conference game; ^{†}Homecoming; Rankings from AP Poll released prior to the game
