= 1984 Hawaii Rainbow Warriors football team =

American college football season

1984 Hawaii Rainbow Warriors football
- Conference: Western Athletic Conference
- Record: 7–4 (5–2 WAC)
- Head coach: Dick Tomey (8th season)
- Home stadium: Aloha Stadium

1984 Western Athletic Conference football standings
	Conf.					Overall
Team	W		L		T	W		L		T
No. 1 BYU $	8	–	0	–	0	13	–	0	–	0
Hawaii	5	–	2	–	0	7	–	4	–	0
Air Force	4	–	3	–	0	8	–	4	–	0
Utah	4	–	3	–	1	6	–	5	–	1
San Diego State	4	–	3	–	1	4	–	7	–	1
Wyoming	4	–	4	–	0	6	–	6	–	0
Colorado State	3	–	5	–	0	3	–	8	–	0
New Mexico	1	–	7	–	0	4	–	8	–	0
UTEP	1	–	7	–	0	2	–	9	–	0
$ – Conference champion; Rankings from AP Poll

The 1984 Hawaii Rainbow Warriors football team represented the University of Hawaiʻi at Mānoa in the Western Athletic Conference during the 1984 NCAA Division I-A football season. In their eighth season under head coach Dick Tomey, the Rainbow Warriors compiled a 7–4 record.

== Schedule ==
Date	Opponent	Site	Result	Attendance	Source
September 8	Cal State Fullerton*	Aloha Stadium; Halawa, HI	L 13–21	45,066	
September 15	at Colorado State	Hughes Stadium; Fort Collins, CO	L 3–10	25,754	
September 22	No. 4 BYU	Aloha Stadium; Halawa, HI	L 13–18	50,000	
September 29	UNLV*	Aloha Stadium; Halawa, HI	W 16–12	41,904	
October 6	Fresno State*	Aloha Stadium; Halawa, HI (rivalry)	W 27–15	41,999	
October 13	at UTEP	Sun Bowl; El Paso, TX	W 24–20	21,121	
October 20	Utah	Aloha Stadium; Halawa, HI	W 20–17	43,804	
October 27	San Diego State	Aloha Stadium; Halawa, HI	W 16–10	44,017	
November 3	Wyoming^{†}	Aloha Stadium; Halawa, HI (rivalry)	W 31–28	48,804	
November 24	New Mexico	Aloha Stadium; Halawa, HI	W 48–13	46,290	
December 1	Iowa*	Aloha Stadium; Halawa, HI	L 6–17	50,000	
*Non-conference game; ^{†}Homecoming; Rankings from Coaches' Poll released prior to the game

== Personnel ==
1984 Hawaii Warriors football team roster
Players
Coaches
Offense

Pos.	#	Name	Class

Defense

Pos.	#	Name	Class
LB		M. L. Johnson	So
DL		Al Noga	Fr

Special teams

Pos.	#	Name	Class

Head coach

- Dick Tomey

Coordinators/assistant coaches

Legend

- (C) Team captain
- (S) Suspended
- (I) Ineligible
- Injured
- Redshirt
