= 1984 Wyoming Cowboys football team =

American college football season

1984 Wyoming Cowboys football
- Conference: Western Athletic Conference
- Record: 6–6 (4–4 WAC)
- Head coach: Al Kincaid (4th season)
- Captains: Jay Novacek; Joe Ramunno; Bruce Mowry; Troy Schroede
- Home stadium: War Memorial Stadium

1984 Western Athletic Conference football standings
	Conf.					Overall
Team	W		L		T	W		L		T
No. 1 BYU $	8	–	0	–	0	13	–	0	–	0
Hawaii	5	–	2	–	0	7	–	4	–	0
Air Force	4	–	3	–	0	8	–	4	–	0
Utah	4	–	3	–	1	6	–	5	–	1
San Diego State	4	–	3	–	1	4	–	7	–	1
Wyoming	4	–	4	–	0	6	–	6	–	0
Colorado State	3	–	5	–	0	3	–	8	–	0
New Mexico	1	–	7	–	0	4	–	8	–	0
UTEP	1	–	7	–	0	2	–	9	–	0
$ – Conference champion; Rankings from AP Poll

The 1984 Wyoming Cowboys football team represented the University of Wyoming as a member of the Western Athletic Conference (WAC) during the 1984 NCAA Division I-A football season. Led by fourth-year head coach Al Kincaid, the Cowboys compiled a 6-6 record (4-4 against conference opponents), and finished sixth in the WAC. The team played home games at War Memorial Stadium in Laramie, Wyoming.

Jay Novacek was in his senior season with the Cowboys. He finished his Cowboys career with 83 career receptions for 1,536 yards and 10 touchdowns as a tight end.

== Schedule ==
Date	Opponent	Site	Result	Attendance	Source
September 1	South Dakota*	War Memorial Stadium; Laramie, WY	W 31–13	15,555	
September 8	at No. 2 Nebraska*	Memorial Stadium; Lincoln, NE	L 7–42	76,125	
September 15	Air Force	War Memorial Stadium; Laramie, WY	W 26–20	31,487	
September 22	at Oregon State*	Parker Stadium; Corvallis, OR	L 14–41	25,000	
September 29	Utah	War Memorial Stadium; Laramie, WY	W 21–14	17,055	
October 6	San Diego State	War Memorial Stadium; Laramie, WY	L 0–21	19,223	
October 13	at No. 5 BYU	Cougar Stadium; Provo, UT	L 38–41	64,839	
October 20	New Mexico	War Memorial Stadium; Laramie, WY	W 59–21	11,742	
October 27	at Colorado State	Hughes Stadium; Fort Collins, CO (rivalry)	W 43–34	27,252	
November 3	at Hawaii	Aloha Stadium; Halawa, HI (rivalry)	L 28–31	48,804	
November 10	South Dakota State*	War Memorial Stadium; Laramie, WY	W 45–29	10,123	
November 17	at UTEP	Sun Bowl; El Paso, TX	L 22–35	10,121	
*Non-conference game; Rankings from AP Poll released prior to the game

== Awards and honors ==
- Jay Novacek, Kodak All-American football team
- Jay Novacek, NCAA record for receiving yards per receptions by a tight end.
- Kevin Lowe, NCAA record for highest rushing yards per attempt in a game (min. 10 att.) November 10, 1984 against South Dakota State

== Team players in the NFL ==
The following were selected in the 1985 NFL draft.

Player	Position	Round	Overall	NFL team
Jay Novacek	Tight end	6	158	St. Louis Cardinals
