= 1984 Colorado State Rams football team =

American college football season

1984 Colorado State Rams football
- Conference: Western Athletic Conference
- Record: 3–8 (3–5 WAC)
- Head coach: Leon Fuller (3rd season)
- Offensive coordinator: Sonny Lubick (3rd season)
- Defensive coordinator: Gary Sloan (3rd season)
- Home stadium: Hughes Stadium

1984 Western Athletic Conference football standings
	Conf.					Overall
Team	W		L		T	W		L		T
No. 1 BYU $	8	–	0	–	0	13	–	0	–	0
Hawaii	5	–	2	–	0	7	–	4	–	0
Air Force	4	–	3	–	0	8	–	4	–	0
Utah	4	–	3	–	1	6	–	5	–	1
San Diego State	4	–	3	–	1	4	–	7	–	1
Wyoming	4	–	4	–	0	6	–	6	–	0
Colorado State	3	–	5	–	0	3	–	8	–	0
New Mexico	1	–	7	–	0	4	–	8	–	0
UTEP	1	–	7	–	0	2	–	9	–	0
$ – Conference champion; Rankings from AP Poll

The 1984 Colorado State Rams football team represented Colorado State University in the Western Athletic Conference during the 1984 NCAA Division I-A football season. In their third season under head coach Leon Fuller, the Rams compiled a 3–8 record.

== Schedule ==
Date	Opponent	Site	Result	Attendance	Source
September 8	at Mississippi State*	Scott Field; Starkville, MS	L 9–14	27,236	
September 15	Hawaii	Hughes Stadium; Fort Collins, CO	W 10–3	25,236	
September 22	Cal State Fullerton*	Hughes Stadium; Fort Collins, CO	L 22–34	23,512	
September 29	at Air Force	Falcon Stadium; Colorado Springs, CO (rivalry)	L 10–52	27,806	
October 6	No. 7 BYU	Hughes Stadium; Fort Collins, CO	L 9–52	28,671	
October 13	at New Mexico	University Stadium; Albuquerque, NM	W 16–10	23,572	
October 20	at San Diego State	Jack Murphy Stadium; San Diego, CA	L 24–41	20,942	
October 27	Wyoming	Hughes Stadium; Fort Collins, CO (rivalry)	L 34–43	27,252	
November 3	at Utah	Robert Rice Stadium; Salt Lake City, UT	L 23–35	20,019	
November 10	UTEP	Hughes Stadium; Fort Collins, CO	W 59–31	11,284	
November 17	at Arizona State*	Sun Devil Stadium; Tempe, AZ	L 14–45	67,143	
*Non-conference game; Rankings from Coaches' Poll released prior to the game

== Roster ==
1984 Colorado State Rams football team roster
Players
Coaches
Offense

Pos.	#	Name	Class
TE	91	Harper LeBel	Sr
QB	12	Kelly Stouffer	So

Defense

Pos.	#	Name	Class

Special teams

Pos.	#	Name	Class

Head coach

- Leon Fuller

Coordinators/assistant coaches

Legend

- (C) Team captain
- (S) Suspended
- (I) Ineligible
- Injured
- Redshirt
