= Mike Waters (American football) =

American football player (born 1962)

No. 33, 88
- Positions: Fullback, tight end

Personal information
- Born: March 15, 1962 (age 64); San Diego, California, U.S.
- Listed height: 6 ft 2 in (1.88 m)
- Listed weight: 228 lb (103 kg)

Career information
- High school: Sherman E. Burroughs (Ridgecrest, California)
- College: San Diego State
- NFL draft: 1985: 9th round, 235th overall pick

Career history
- New York Jets (1985)*; Philadelphia Eagles (1986); New Orleans Saints (1987)
- * Offseason or practice squad member only
- Stats at Pro Football Reference

Robert Michael Waters (born March 15, 1962) is an American former professional football player who was a fullback and tight end in the National Football League (NFL) with the Philadelphia Eagles and New Orleans Saints. He played college football for the San Diego State Aztecs and was selected by the New York Jets in the ninth round of the 1985 NFL draft.

== Early life ==
Robert Michael Waters was born on March 15, 1962, in San Diego, California. He attended Sherman E. Burroughs High School in Ridgecrest, California.

== College career ==
Waters played junior college football at Bakersfield College from 1981 to 1982 as a tailback. He transferred to San Diego State University, where he was a two-year letterman for the Aztecs from 1983 to 1984 at fullback. He played in all 24 games for the Aztecs during his two-season career, recording totals of 312 carries for 1,266 yards and five touchdowns, 46 receptions for 415 yards and two touchdowns, and 20 kick returns for 494 yards and one touchdown.

== Professional career ==
Waters was selected by the New York Jets in the ninth round, with the 235th overall pick, of the 1985 NFL draft as a fullback. He was released on August 19 after the second game of the 1985 preseason.

Water signed with the Philadelphia Eagles on March 19, 1986. He won the team's starting fullback job, "shocking everyone" according to The Times. In the season opener, he caught two passes for 27 yards on five targets while also rushing three times for four yards in a 41–14 loss to the Washington Redskins. Several days prior to the Eagles' next game on September 14 against the defending-Super Bowl champion Chicago Bears, Water called the Bears "pansies". Waters started the Bears game but did not record any statistics. It was the final start of his NFL career. Waters was released on October 8, 1986, after fumbling two punts against the Atlanta Falcons. He appeared in five games, starting two, overall for the Eagles during the 1986 season, recording two catches for 27 yards on five targets, five rushes for eight yards, seven punt returns for 30 yards, three fumbles, and one fumble recovery.

Waters was signed by the New Orleans Saints on February 24, 1987. He was released on September 7 but re-signed on September 26 during the 1987 NFL players strike. He stayed on with the team after the strike ended, playing in five games as a reserve tight end while catching five passes for 140 yards and one touchdown on 17 targets. Waters' 82-yard touchdown catch from John Fourcade was the longest in Saints history. Waters was placed on injured reserve on November 4, 1987, ending his season. He was released by New Orleans on August 23, 1988, after the third game of the 1988 preseason.
