= 1984 Southern Illinois Salukis football team =

American college football season

1984 Southern Illinois Salukis football
- Conference: Missouri Valley Conference
- Record: 3–8 (0–5 MVC)
- Head coach: Ray Dorr (1st season)
- Home stadium: McAndrew Stadium

1984 Missouri Valley Conference football standings
	Conf.					Overall
Team	W		L		T	W		L		T
Tulsa $	5	–	0	–	0	6	–	5	–	0
No. 5 Indiana State ^	4	–	1	–	0	9	–	3	–	0
Illinois State	3	–	2	–	0	5	–	6	–	0
West Texas State	2	–	3	–	0	3	–	8	–	0
Wichita State	2	–	3	–	0	2	–	9	–	0
Drake	2	–	3	–	0	4	–	7	–	0
Southern Illinois	0	–	5	–	0	3	–	8	–	0
$ – Conference champion; ^ – NCAA Division I-AA playoff participant; Indiana State's game against Louisville and West Texas State and Wichita State's games against New Mexico State counted in the conference standings. The conference was a hybrid of NCAA Division I-A and I-AA programs. Tulsa and Wichita State were I-A and the other teams were I-AA.; Rankings from NCAA Division I-AA Football Committee poll

The 1984 Southern Illinois Salukis football team was an American football team that represented Southern Illinois University (now known as Southern Illinois University Carbondale) in the Missouri Valley Conference (MVC) during the 1984 NCAA Division I-AA football season. Under first-year head coach Ray Dorr, the team compiled a 3–8 record (0–5 against conference opponents) and finished in last place out of seven teams in the MVC. The team played its home games at McAndrew Stadium in Carbondale, Illinois.

== Schedule ==
Date	Opponent	Site	Result	Attendance	Source
September 1	at Tulsa	Skelly Stadium; Tulsa, OK	L 10–23	17,127	
September 8	at Illinois State	Hancock Stadium; Normal, IL	L 7–35	7,166	
September 15	Western Illinois*	McAndrew Stadium; Carbondale, IL	L 24–34	12,000	
September 22	Arkansas State*	McAndrew Stadium; Carbondale, IL	L 0–19	7,200	
September 29	at Southeast Missouri State*	Houck Stadium; Cape Girardeau, MO	W 27–16	7,500	
October 6	Northern Iowa*	McAndrew Stadium; Carbondale, IL	W 40–10	6,025	
October 13	at Eastern Illinois*	O'Brien Field; Charleston, IL	W 48–40	10,140	
October 20	West Texas State	McAndrew Stadium; Carbondale, IL	L 17–24	2,600	
October 27	Indiana State	McAndrew Stadium; Carbondale, IL	L 10–27	8,033	
November 3	at Drake	Drake Stadium; Des Moines, IA	L 17–20	5,200	
November 10	at Southwest Missouri State*	Briggs Stadium; Springfield, MO	L 6–31	807	
*Non-conference game
