= 1984 Illinois State Redbirds football team =

American college football season

1984 Illinois State Redbirds football
- Conference: Missouri Valley Conference
- Record: 5–6 (3–2 MVC)
- Head coach: Bob Otolski (4th season)
- Home stadium: Hancock Stadium

1984 Missouri Valley Conference football standings
	Conf.					Overall
Team	W		L		T	W		L		T
Tulsa $	5	–	0	–	0	6	–	5	–	0
No. 5 Indiana State ^	4	–	1	–	0	9	–	3	–	0
Illinois State	3	–	2	–	0	5	–	6	–	0
West Texas State	2	–	3	–	0	3	–	8	–	0
Wichita State	2	–	3	–	0	2	–	9	–	0
Drake	2	–	3	–	0	4	–	7	–	0
Southern Illinois	0	–	5	–	0	3	–	8	–	0
$ – Conference champion; ^ – NCAA Division I-AA playoff participant; Indiana State's game against Louisville and West Texas State and Wichita State's games against New Mexico State counted in the conference standings. The conference was a hybrid of NCAA Division I-A and I-AA programs. Tulsa and Wichita State were I-A and the other teams were I-AA.; Rankings from NCAA Division I-AA Football Committee poll

The 1984 Illinois State Redbirds football team was an American football team that represented Illinois State University as a member of the Missouri Valley Conference (MVC) during the 1984 NCAA Division I-AA football season. In their fourth year under head coach Bob Otolski, the Redbirds compiled an overall record of 5–6 with a mark of 3–2 in conference play, placing third out of seven teams in the MVC. Illinois State played home games at Hancock Stadium in Normal, Illinois.

== Schedule ==
Date	Opponent	Site	Result	Attendance	Source
September 1	Lincoln (MO)*	Hancock Stadium; Normal, IL	W 54–0	5,583	
September 8	Southern Illinois	Hancock Stadium; Normal, IL	W 35–7	7,166	
September 15	at Western Michigan*	Waldo Stadium; Kalamazoo, MI	L 14–41	10,524	
September 22	at No. 3 Indiana State	Memorial Stadium; Terre Haute, IN	L 7–19	10,213	
September 29	Drake	Hancock Stadium; Normal, IL	W 28–0	12,136	
October 6	at Eastern Illinois*	O'Brien Stadium; Charleston, IL	W 34–21	7,144	
October 20	at UCF*	Florida Citrus Bowl; Orlando, FL	L 24–28	11,648	
October 27	at Western Illinois*	Hanson Field; Macomb, IL	L 14–28	2,876	
November 3	Tulsa	Hancock Stadium; Normal, IL	L 7–28	9,491	
November 10	Marshall*	Hancock Stadium; Normal, IL	L 3–10		
November 17	at Wichita State	Cessna Stadium; Wichita, KS	W 17–0	1,100	
*Non-conference game; Rankings from NCAA Division I-AA Football Committee Poll released prior to the game
