= 1984 Indiana State Sycamores football team =

American college football season

1984 Indiana State Sycamores football

NCAA Division I-AA Quarterfinal, L 41–42^{3OT}vs. Middle Tennessee State
- Conference: Missouri Valley Conference
- Record: 9–3 (4–1 MVC)
- Head coach: Dennis Raetz (5th season)
- Offensive coordinator: Pete Hoener (5th season)
- Defensive coordinator: Jerry Lasko (1st season)
- Home stadium: Memorial Stadium

1984 Missouri Valley Conference football standings
	Conf.					Overall
Team	W		L		T	W		L		T
Tulsa $	5	–	0	–	0	6	–	5	–	0
No. 5 Indiana State ^	4	–	1	–	0	9	–	3	–	0
Illinois State	3	–	2	–	0	5	–	6	–	0
West Texas State	2	–	3	–	0	3	–	8	–	0
Wichita State	2	–	3	–	0	2	–	9	–	0
Drake	2	–	3	–	0	4	–	7	–	0
Southern Illinois	0	–	5	–	0	3	–	8	–	0
$ – Conference champion; ^ – NCAA Division I-AA playoff participant; Indiana State's game against Louisville and West Texas State and Wichita State's games against New Mexico State counted in the conference standings. The conference was a hybrid of NCAA Division I-A and I-AA programs. Tulsa and Wichita State were I-A and the other teams were I-AA.; Rankings from NCAA Division I-AA Football Committee poll

The 1984 Indiana State Sycamores football team represented Indiana State University as a member of the Missouri Valley Conference (MVC) during the 1984 NCAA Division I-AA football season. They were led by fifth-year head coach Dennis Raetz and played their home games at Memorial Stadium. Indiana State finished the season 9–3 overall and 4–1 in MVC play to place second. They were invited to the NCAA Division I-AA playoffs, where they lost to Middle Tennessee State, in the quarterfinal by a score of 42–41 in triple overtime. This was Sycamores' second straight appearance in the playoffs and their last until 2014. The roster included cornerback Wayne Davis and safety Vencie Glenn, who both went on to careers in the National Football League (NFL). Future college head coach Trent Miles was a wide receiver. Quarterback Jeff Miller was selected Honorable Mention All-American.

== Schedule ==
Date	Opponent	Rank	Site	TV	Result	Attendance	Source
September 1	Wayne State (MI)*		Memorial Stadium; Terre Haute, IN		W 42–6	7,881	
September 8	Eastern Illinois*		Memorial Stadium; Terre Haute, IN		W 24–17	9,125	
September 22	at Illinois State	No. 3	Memorial Stadium; Terre Haute, IN	SportsTime cable	W 19–7	10,213	
September 29	Central Missouri State*	No. 2	Memorial Stadium; Terre Haute, IN		W 27–3	9,194	
October 6	vs. Ball State*	No. 1	Hoosier Dome; Indianapolis, IN (rivalry)		W 34–6	20,242	
October 13	at Louisville (Note: Designated conference game)	No. 1	Cardinal Stadium; Louisville, KY		W 44–21	25,051	
October 20	Drake^{†}	No. 1	Memorial Stadium; Terre Haute, IN		W 17–3	10,170	
October 27	at Southern Illinois	No. 1	McAndrew Stadium; Carbondale, IL		W 27–10	8,033	
November 3	UCF*	No. 1	Memorial Stadium; Terre Haute, IN		W 38–0	8,367	
November 10	Tulsa	No. 1	Memorial Stadium; Terre Haute, IN		L 17–24	12,392	
November 17	at Western Illinois*	No. 3	Hanson Field; Macomb, IL		L 2–22	7,732	
December 1	No. 7 Middle Tennessee State*	No. 5	Memorial Stadium; Terre Haute, IN (NCAA Division I-AA Quarterfinal)		L 41–42 ^{3OT}	6,225	
*Non-conference game; ^{†}Homecoming; Rankings from NCAA Division I-AA Football Committee Poll released prior to the game

== Rankings ==
Ranking movements Legend: ██ Increase in ranking ██ Decrease in ranking — = Not ranked RV = Received votes
	Week														
Poll	Pre	1	2	3	4	5	6	7	8	9	10	11	12	13	Final
Sports Network	RV	RV	—	RV	RV	25	1	1	1	1	1	1	1	18	5
Coaches	—	—	—	RV	RV	RV	1	1	1	1	11	1	1	18	5
