= 1984 Fresno State Bulldogs football team =

American college football season

1984 Fresno State Bulldogs football
- Conference: Pacific Coast Athletic Association
- Record: 7–5 (4–3 PCAA)
- Head coach: Jim Sweeney (7th season)
- Home stadium: Bulldog Stadium

1984 Pacific Coast Athletic Association football standings
	Conf.					Overall
Team	W		L		T	W		L		T
Cal State Fullerton $	7	–	0	–	0	12	–	0	–	0
San Jose State	6	–	1	–	0	7	–	4	–	0
Fresno State	4	–	3	–	0	7	–	5	–	0
Long Beach State	4	–	3	–	0	5	–	6	–	0
Pacific (CA)	3	–	4	–	0	5	–	6	–	0
Utah State	2	–	5	–	0	2	–	9	–	0
New Mexico State	1	–	6	–	0	2	–	9	–	0
UNLV	0	–	7	–	0	0	–	13	–	0
$ – Conference champion; Records adjusted for UNLV's forfeit of all 11 victories

The 1984 Fresno State Bulldogs football team represented California State University, Fresno as a member of the Pacific Coast Athletic Association (PCAA) during the 1984 NCAA Division I-A football season. Led by seventh-year head coach Jim Sweeney, Fresno State finished the season with an overall record of 6–6 and a mark of 3–4 in conference play, tying for fourth place in the PCAA. The Bulldogs played their home games at Bulldog Stadium in Fresno, California.

After the 1984 season, it was discovered that the UNLV Rebels had used multiple ineligible players during both the 1983 and 1984 seasons. As a result, UNLV's win in 1984 over Fresno State was forfeited, adjusting the Bulldogs' record to 7–5 overall and 4–3 in conference play, moving them into a tie for third place in the PCAA.

== Schedule ==
Date	Opponent	Site	Result	Attendance	Source
September 1	at Arizona*	Arizona Stadium; Tucson, AZ	W 27–22	43,477	
September 8	at Boise State*	Bronco Stadium; Boise, ID (rivalry)	W 37–21	19,252	
September 15	Cal Poly*	Bulldog Stadium; Fresno, CA	W 14–0	30,991	
September 22	Long Beach State	Bulldog Stadium; Fresno, CA	W 20–17	31,162	
September 29	New Mexico State	Bulldog Stadium; Fresno, CA	W 53–24	32,952	
October 6	at Hawaii*	Aloha Stadium; Halawa, HI (rivalry)	L 15–27	41,999	
October 20	Utah State	Bulldog Stadium; Fresno, CA	W 43–18	31,463	
October 27	at San Jose State	Spartan Stadium; San Jose, CA (rivalry)	L 17–18	17,047	
November 3	at Cal State Fullerton	Santa Ana Stadium; Santa Ana, CA	L 17–20	12,121	
November 10	Pacific (CA)	Bulldog Stadium; Fresno, CA	L 6–24	24,684	
November 17	Montana State*	Bulldog Stadium; Fresno, CA	L 31–35	24,088	
November 24	at UNLV^{†}	Sam Boyd Silver Bowl; Whitney, NV	W 13–27 (forfeit win)	12,155	
*Non-conference game; ^{†}Homecoming

== Team players in the NFL ==
No Fresno State Bulldogs were selected in the 1985 NFL draft. The following finished their college career in 1984, were not drafted, but played in the NFL.

Player	Position	First NFL team
Tom Neville	Guard – Tackle	1986 Green Bay Packers
