= 1984 San Jose State Spartans football team =

American college football season

1984 San Jose State Spartans football
- Conference: Pacific Coast Athletic Association
- Record: 7–4 (6–1 PCAA)
- Head coach: Claude Gilbert (1st season)
- Home stadium: Spartan Stadium

1984 Pacific Coast Athletic Association football standings
	Conf.					Overall
Team	W		L		T	W		L		T
Cal State Fullerton $	7	–	0	–	0	12	–	0	–	0
San Jose State	6	–	1	–	0	7	–	4	–	0
Fresno State	4	–	3	–	0	7	–	5	–	0
Long Beach State	4	–	3	–	0	5	–	6	–	0
Pacific (CA)	3	–	4	–	0	5	–	6	–	0
Utah State	2	–	5	–	0	2	–	9	–	0
New Mexico State	1	–	6	–	0	2	–	9	–	0
UNLV	0	–	7	–	0	0	–	13	–	0
$ – Conference champion; Records adjusted for UNLV's forfeit of all 11 victories

The 1984 San Jose State Spartans football team represented San Jose State University during the 1984 NCAA Division I-A football season as a member of the Pacific Coast Athletic Association. (Note: The Big West Conference was known as the Pacific Coast Athletic Association from its founding in 1969 through 1987.) The team was led by head coach Claude Gilbert, in his first year as head coach at San Jose State. He had been their defensive coordinator for the previous three years. They played home games at Spartan Stadium in San Jose, California. The Spartans finished the 1984 season with a record of five wins and six losses (6–5, 5–2 PCAA).

After the season was over, it was discovered that the UNLV Rebels had used multiple ineligible players during both the 1983 and 1984 season. As a result, San Jose State's loss at UNLV turns into a forfeit win and their record is adjusted to 7–4, 6–1 PCAA.

== Schedule ==
Date	Opponent	Site	Result	Attendance	Source
September 1	New Mexico State	Spartan Stadium; San Jose, CA	W 14–0	12,687	
September 8	at UNLV	Sam Boyd Silver Bowl; Whitney, NV	W 15–30 (forfeit win)	21,360	
September 15	at Arizona State*	Sun Devil Stadium; Tempe, AZ	L 0–48	63,271	
September 22	at Stanford*	Stanford Stadium; Stanford, CA (rivalry)	L 27–28	70,426	
September 29	at California*	California Memorial Stadium; Berkeley, CA	W 33–18	43,200	
October 6	Utah State	Spartan Stadium; San Jose, CA	W 38–21	14,667	
October 13	at Cal State Fullerton	Santa Ana Stadium; Santa Ana, CA	L 12–21	9,260	
October 20	Southwestern Louisiana*	Spartan Stadium; San Jose, CA	L 28–35	6,023	
October 27	Fresno State^{†}	Spartan Stadium; San Jose, CA (rivalry)	W 18–17	17,047	
November 10	Long Beach State	Spartan Stadium; San Jose, CA	W 42–7	4,444	
November 17	at Pacific (CA)	Pacific Memorial Stadium; Stockton, CA (Victory Bell)	W 33–0	1,000	
*Non-conference game; ^{†}Homecoming

== Team players in the NFL ==
The following were selected in the 1985 NFL draft.

Player	Position	Round	Overall	NFL team
Tony Smith	Wide receiver	5	134	New York Jets

The following finished their college career in 1984, were not drafted, but played in the NFL.

Player	Position	First NFL team
Charles Clinton	Defensive back	1987 Houston Oilers
Keith McDonald	Wide receiver	1987 Houston Oilers
Kevin Bowman	Wide receiver	1987 Philadelphia Eagles
