= 1984 Tulsa Golden Hurricane football team =

American college football season

1984 Tulsa Golden Hurricane football

MVC champion
- Conference: Missouri Valley Conference
- Record: 6–5 (5–0 MVC)
- Head coach: John Cooper (8th season)
- Offensive coordinator: Steve Logan (1st season)
- Defensive coordinator: Bill Young (2nd season)
- Home stadium: Skelly Stadium

1984 Missouri Valley Conference football standings
	Conf.					Overall
Team	W		L		T	W		L		T
Tulsa $	5	–	0	–	0	6	–	5	–	0
No. 5 Indiana State ^	4	–	1	–	0	9	–	3	–	0
Illinois State	3	–	2	–	0	5	–	6	–	0
West Texas State	2	–	3	–	0	3	–	8	–	0
Wichita State	2	–	3	–	0	2	–	9	–	0
Drake	2	–	3	–	0	4	–	7	–	0
Southern Illinois	0	–	5	–	0	3	–	8	–	0
$ – Conference champion; ^ – NCAA Division I-AA playoff participant; Indiana State's game against Louisville and West Texas State and Wichita State's games against New Mexico State counted in the conference standings. The conference was a hybrid of NCAA Division I-A and I-AA programs. Tulsa and Wichita State were I-A and the other teams were I-AA.; Rankings from NCAA Division I-AA Football Committee poll

The 1984 Tulsa Golden Hurricane football team represented the University of Tulsa during the 1984 NCAA Division I-A football season. In their seventh and final year under head coach John Cooper, the Golden Hurricane compiled a 6–5 record (5–0 against conference opponents) and won the Missouri Valley Conference championship.

The team's statistical leaders included Richie Stephenson with 1,134 passing yards, Gordon Brown with 995 rushing yards, and Ronnie Kelley with 675 yards. Head coach John Cooper was later inducted into the College Football Hall of Fame.

== Schedule ==
Date	Opponent	Site	Result	Attendance	Source
September 1	Southern Illinois	Skelly Stadium; Tulsa, OK	W 23–10	17,127	
September 15	at No. 8 BYU*	Cougar Stadium; Provo, UT	L 15–38	64,327	
September 22	at Arkansas*	Razorback Stadium; Fayetteville, AR	L 9–18	43,680	
September 29	No. 10 Oklahoma State*^{†}	Skelly Stadium; Tulsa, OK (rivalry)	L 7–31	40,235	
October 6	at West Texas State	Kimbrough Memorial Stadium; Canyon, TX	W 35–7	2,300	
October 13	East Carolina*	Skelly Stadium; Tulsa, OK	W 31–20	16,674	
October 20	Wichita State	Skelly Stadium; Tulsa, OK	W 55–20	12,621	
October 27	at Texas Tech*	Jones Stadium; Lubbock, TX	L 17–20	34,624	
November 3	at Illinois State	Hancock Stadium; Normal, IL	W 28–7	9,491	
November 10	at Indiana State*	Memorial Stadium; Terre Haute, IN	W 24–17	12,392	
November 17	Southwestern Louisiana*	Skelly Stadium; Tulsa, OK	L 17–18	13,104	
*Non-conference game; ^{†}Homecoming; Rankings from AP Poll released prior to the game

== After the season ==
=== 1985 NFL draft ===
The following Golden Hurricane players were selected in the 1985 NFL draft following the season.

Round	Pick	Player	Position	NFL club
10	276	Albert Myres	Defensive back	Los Angeles Raiders
12	309	Dean Hamel	Defensive tackle	Washington Redskins
12	310	Byron Jones	Defensive tackle	Minnesota Vikings
