= 1984 Ohio Bobcats football team =

American college football season

1984 Ohio Bobcats football
- Conference: Mid-American Conference
- Record: 4–6–1 (4–4–1 MAC)
- Head coach: Brian Burke (6th season)
- Home stadium: Peden Stadium

1984 Mid-American Conference football standings
	Conf.					Overall
Team	W		L		T	W		L		T
Toledo $	7	–	1	–	1	8	–	3	–	1
Bowling Green	7	–	2	–	0	8	–	3	–	0
Central Michigan	6	–	2	–	1	8	–	2	–	1
Ohio	4	–	4	–	1	4	–	6	–	1
Northern Illinois	3	–	5	–	1	4	–	6	–	1
Miami (OH)	3	–	5	–	0	4	–	7	–	0
Ball State	3	–	5	–	0	3	–	8	–	0
Western Michigan	3	–	6	–	0	5	–	6	–	0
Kent State	3	–	6	–	0	4	–	7	–	0
Eastern Michigan	2	–	5	–	2	2	–	7	–	2
$ – Conference champion

The 1984 Ohio Bobcats football team was an American football team that represented Ohio University in the Mid-American Conference (MAC) during the 1984 NCAA Division I-A football season. In their sixth and final season under head coach Brian Burke, the Bobcats compiled a 4–6–1 record (4–4–1 against MAC opponents), finished in fourth place in the MAC, and were outscored by all opponents by a combined total of 262 to 134. They played their home games in Peden Stadium in Athens, Ohio.

== Schedule ==
Date	Opponent	Site	Result	Attendance	Source
September 1	at West Virginia*	Mountaineer Field; Morgantown, WV	L 0–38	57,070	
September 8	at NC State*	Carter–Finley Stadium; Raleigh, NC	L 6–43	40,800	
September 15	at Ball State	Ball State Stadium; Muncie, IN	W 31–17		
September 22	at Eastern Michigan	Rynearson Stadium; Ypsilanti, MI	W 16–13	19,281	
September 29	Toledo	Peden Stadium; Athens, OH	T 16–16		
October 13	at Central Michigan	Kelly/Shorts Stadium; Mount Pleasant, MI	L 3–35		
October 20	Kent State	Peden Stadium; Athens, OH	L 7–19	18,437	
October 27	at Western Michigan	Waldo Stadium; Kalamazoo, MI	L 14–33	15,219	
November 3	Miami (OH)	Peden Stadium; Athens, OH (rivalry)	W 24–19		
November 10	at Bowling Green	Doyt Perry Stadium; Bowling Green, OH	L 7–28		
November 17	Northern Illinois	Peden Stadium; Athens, OH	W 10–3		
*Non-conference game
