= 1984 Middle Tennessee Blue Raiders football team =

American college football season

1984 Middle Tennessee Blue Raiders football

NCAA Division I-AA Semifinal, L 13–21 vs. Louisiana Tech
- Conference: Ohio Valley Conference
- Record: 11–3 (5–2 OVC)
- Head coach: Boots Donnelly (6th season)
- Home stadium: Johnny "Red" Floyd Stadium

1984 Ohio Valley Conference football standings
	Conf.					Overall
Team	W		L		T	W		L		T
No. 8 Eastern Kentucky $^	6	–	1	–	0	8	–	4	–	0
No. 7 Middle Tennessee ^	5	–	2	–	0	11	–	3	–	0
No. 13 Murray State	5	–	2	–	0	9	–	2	–	0
Youngstown State	5	–	2	–	0	7	–	4	–	0
Austin Peay	4	–	3	–	0	7	–	4	–	0
Akron	2	–	5	–	0	4	–	7	–	0
Morehead State	1	–	6	–	0	2	–	9	–	0
Tennessee Tech	0	–	7	–	0	0	–	11	–	0
$ – Conference champion; ^ – NCAA Division I-AA playoff participant; Rankings from NCAA Division I-AA Football Committee poll

The 1984 Middle Tennessee Blue Raiders football team represented Middle Tennessee State University as a member of the Ohio Valley Conference (OVC) during the 1984 NCAA Division I-AA football season. Led by sixth-year head coach Boots Donnelly, Middle Tennessee compiled an overall record of 11–3 with a mark of 5–2 in conference play, and finished second in the OVC. The Blue Raiders advances to the NCAA Division I-AA Semifinal and lost to Louisiana Tech.

== Schedule ==
Date	Opponent	Rank	Site	Result	Attendance	Source
September 1	Lenoir–Rhyne*		Johnny "Red" Floyd Stadium; Murfreesboro, TN	W 31–0	8,000	
September 15	at Jacksonville State*		Paul Snow Stadium; Jacksonville, AL	W 27–11	8,200	
September 22	Morehead State		Johnny "Red" Floyd Stadium; Murfreesboro, TN	W 42–28	8,500	
September 29	Akron		Johnny "Red" Floyd Stadium; Murfreesboro, TN	W 16–3		
October 6	at No. 12 Eastern Kentucky	No. T–14	Hanger Field; Richmond, KY	W 22–10		
October 13	at No. 3 Murray State	No. 8	Roy Stewart Stadium; Murray, KY	W 19–16		
October 20	Austin Peay	No. 5	Johnny "Red" Floyd Stadium; Murfreesboro, TN	L 7–16		
October 27	at Youngstown State	No. 7	Stambaugh Stadium; Youngstown, OH	L 13–23	6,052	
November 3	at Western Kentucky*	No. 14	L. T. Smith Stadium; Bowling Green, KY (rivalry)	W 45–24	16,500	
November 10	No. 11 Georgia Southern*	No. T–12	Johnny "Red" Floyd Stadium; Murfreesboro, TN	W 42–7	6,000	
November 17	at Tennessee Tech	No. 9	Tucker Stadium; Cookeville, TN	W 28–10		
November 24	at No. 8 Eastern Kentucky	No. 7	Hanger Field; Richmond, KY (NCAA Division I-AA First Round)	W 27–10	4,800	
December 1	at No. 5 Indiana State	No. 7	Memorial Stadium; Terre Haute, IN (NCAA Division I-AA Quarterfinal)	W 42–41 ^{3OT}	6,225	
December 8	No. 9 Louisiana Tech	No. 7	Johnny "Red" Floyd Stadium; Murfreesboro, TN (NCAA Division I-AA Semifinal)	L 13–21	11,000	
*Non-conference game; Rankings from NCAA Division I-AA Football Committee Poll released prior to the game
