= 1984 Tennessee Tech Golden Eagles football team =

American college football season

1984 Tennessee Tech Golden Eagles football
- Conference: Ohio Valley Conference
- Record: 0–11 (0–7 OVC)
- Head coach: Gary Darnell (2nd season)
- Offensive coordinator: Dennis Franchione (2nd season)
- Home stadium: Tucker Stadium

1984 Ohio Valley Conference football standings
	Conf.					Overall
Team	W		L		T	W		L		T
No. 8 Eastern Kentucky $^	6	–	1	–	0	8	–	4	–	0
No. 7 Middle Tennessee ^	5	–	2	–	0	11	–	3	–	0
No. 13 Murray State	5	–	2	–	0	9	–	2	–	0
Youngstown State	5	–	2	–	0	7	–	4	–	0
Austin Peay	4	–	3	–	0	7	–	4	–	0
Akron	2	–	5	–	0	4	–	7	–	0
Morehead State	1	–	6	–	0	2	–	9	–	0
Tennessee Tech	0	–	7	–	0	0	–	11	–	0
$ – Conference champion; ^ – NCAA Division I-AA playoff participant; Rankings from NCAA Division I-AA Football Committee poll

The 1984 Tennessee Tech Golden Eagles football team represented Tennessee Technological University (commonly referred to as Tennessee Tech) as a member of the Ohio Valley Conference (OVC) during the 1984 NCAA Division I-AA football season. Led by second-year head coach Gary Darnell, the Golden Eagles compiled an overall record of 0–11, with a mark of 0–7 in conference play, and finished eighth in the OVC.

== Schedule ==
Date	Opponent	Site	Result	Attendance	Source
September 8	East Tennessee State*	Tucker Stadium; Cookeville, TN	L 3–10		
September 15	at Kansas State*	KSU Stadium; Manhattan, KS	L 12–28	32,200	
September 22	No. 6 Murray State	Tucker Stadium; Cookeville, TN	L 0–37	7,484	
September 29	at Western Carolina*	E. J. Whitmire Stadium; Cullowhee, NC	L 6–34	10,444	
October 6	at Youngstown State	Stambaugh Stadium; Youngstown, OH	L 0–51		
October 13	No. 7 Tennessee State*	Tucker Stadium; Cookeville, TN	L 3–33	14,623	
October 20	at Morehead State	Jayne Stadium; Morehead, KY	L 14–43		
October 27	at Akron	Rubber Bowl; Akron, OH	L 9–17	5,232	
November 3	No. 16 Eastern Kentucky	Tucker Stadium; Cookeville, TN	L 14–21		
November 10	at Austin Peay	Municipal Stadium; Clarksville, TN	L 7–27	4,500	
November 17	No. 9 Middle Tennessee	Tucker Stadium; Cookeville, TN	L 10–28		
*Non-conference game; Rankings from NCAA Division I-AA Football Committee Poll released prior to the game
