= 1984 Morehead State Eagles football team =

American college football season

1984 Morehead State Eagles football
- Conference: Ohio Valley Conference
- Record: 2–9 (1–6 OVC)
- Head coach: Bill Baldridge (1st season)
- Home stadium: Jayne Stadium

1984 Ohio Valley Conference football standings
	Conf.					Overall
Team	W		L		T	W		L		T
No. 8 Eastern Kentucky $^	6	–	1	–	0	8	–	4	–	0
No. 7 Middle Tennessee ^	5	–	2	–	0	11	–	3	–	0
No. 13 Murray State	5	–	2	–	0	9	–	2	–	0
Youngstown State	5	–	2	–	0	7	–	4	–	0
Austin Peay	4	–	3	–	0	7	–	4	–	0
Akron	2	–	5	–	0	4	–	7	–	0
Morehead State	1	–	6	–	0	2	–	9	–	0
Tennessee Tech	0	–	7	–	0	0	–	11	–	0
$ – Conference champion; ^ – NCAA Division I-AA playoff participant; Rankings from NCAA Division I-AA Football Committee poll

The 1984 Morehead State Eagles football team represented Morehead State University as a member of the Ohio Valley Conference (OVC) during the 1984 NCAA Division I-AA football season. Led by first-year head coach Bill Baldridge, the Eagles compiled an overall record of 2–9, with a mark of 1–6 in conference play, and finished seventh in the OVC.

== Schedule ==
Date	Opponent	Site	Result	Attendance	Source
September 1	Georgetown (KY)*	Jayne Stadium; Morehead, KY	W 31–0	8,000	
September 8	at Marshall*	Fairfield Stadium; Huntington, WV	L 6–40	16,121	
September 15	James Madison*	Jayne Stadium; Morehead, KY	L 28–38	6,500	
September 22	at Middle Tennessee	Johnny "Red" Floyd Stadium; Murfreesboro, TN	L 28–42	8,500	
September 29	No. 6 Murray State	Jayne Stadium; Morehead, KY	L 28–58	3,500	
October 6	at Austin Peay	Municipal Stadium; Clarksville, TN	L 14–21		
October 14	at Akron	Rubber Bowl; Akron, OH	L 3–27	10,864	
October 20	Tennessee Tech	Jayne Stadium; Morehead, KY	W 43–14		
October 27	Western Kentucky*	Jayne Stadium; Morehead, KY	L 31–33	3,500	
November 10	at No. T–12 Eastern Kentucky	Hanger Field; Richmond, KY (rivalry)	L 38–48	8,600	
November 17	Youngstown State	Jayne Stadium; Morehead, KY	L 31–35	2,500	
*Non-conference game; Rankings from NCAA Division I-AA Football Committee Poll released prior to the game
