= 1984 Central Michigan Chippewas football team =

American college football season

1984 Central Michigan Chippewas football
- Conference: Mid-American Conference
- Record: 8–2–1 (6–2–1 MAC)
- Head coach: Herb Deromedi (7th season)
- MVPs: Curtis Adams; Pat Brackett
- Home stadium: Kelly/Shorts Stadium

1984 Mid-American Conference football standings
	Conf.					Overall
Team	W		L		T	W		L		T
Toledo $	7	–	1	–	1	8	–	3	–	1
Bowling Green	7	–	2	–	0	8	–	3	–	0
Central Michigan	6	–	2	–	1	8	–	2	–	1
Ohio	4	–	4	–	1	4	–	6	–	1
Northern Illinois	3	–	5	–	1	4	–	6	–	1
Miami (OH)	3	–	5	–	0	4	–	7	–	0
Ball State	3	–	5	–	0	3	–	8	–	0
Western Michigan	3	–	6	–	0	5	–	6	–	0
Kent State	3	–	6	–	0	4	–	7	–	0
Eastern Michigan	2	–	5	–	2	2	–	7	–	2
$ – Conference champion

The 1984 Central Michigan Chippewas football team represented Central Michigan University in the Mid-American Conference (MAC) during the 1984 NCAA Division I-A football season. In their seventh season under head coach Herb Deromedi, the Chippewas compiled an 8–2–1 record (6–2–1 against MAC opponents), finished in third place in the MAC standings, and outscored their opponents, 282 to 141. The team played its home games in Kelly/Shorts Stadium in Mount Pleasant, Michigan, with attendance of 145,273 in seven home games.

The team's statistical leaders included quarterback Bob DeMarco with 1,427 passing yards, tailback Curtis Adams with 1,204 rushing yards, and split end John DeBoer with 831 receiving yards. Adams and defensive tackle Pat Brackett received the team's most valuable player award. Adams was also selected by the United Press International as a second-team player on the 1984 College Football All-America Team. Six Central Michigan players (Adams, Brackett, DeBoer, outside linebacker Steve Sklenar, linebacker Mike Bevier, and defensive back Jim Bowman) received first-team All-MAC honors.

== Schedule ==
Date	Opponent	Site	Result	Attendance	Source
September 1	Northern Michigan*	Kelly/Shorts Stadium; Mount Pleasant, MI	W 45–22	15,261	
September 15	East Carolina*	Kelly/Shorts Stadium; Mount Pleasant, MI	W 17–12	23,249	
September 22	Western Michigan	Kelly/Shorts Stadium; Mount Pleasant, MI (rivalry)	W 38–19	28,463	
September 29	at Kent State	Dix Stadium; Kent, OH	W 14–10		
October 6	at Eastern Michigan	Rynearson Stadium; Ypsilanti, MI (rivalry)	T 16–16		
October 13	Ohio	Kelly/Shorts Stadium; Mount Pleasant, MI	W 35–3		
October 20	at Miami (OH)	Miami Field; Oxford, OH	W 10–9		
October 27	Bowling Green	Kelly/Shorts Stadium; Mount Pleasant, MI	W 42–21	22,841	
November 3	at Northern Illinois	Huskie Stadium; DeKalb, IL	L 7–8		
November 10	Ball State	Kelly/Shorts Stadium; Mount Pleasant, MI	W 51–7	16,712	
November 17	Toledo	Kelly/Shorts Stadium; Mount Pleasant, MI	L 7–14		
*Non-conference game
