= 1984 Northern Iowa Panthers football team =

American college football season

1984 Northern Iowa Panthers football

Mid-Con co-champion
- Conference: Association of Mid-Continent Universities
- Record: 9–2 (2–1 Mid-Cont)
- Head coach: Darrell Mudra (2nd season)
- Offensive coordinator: Walt Klinker
- Defensive coordinator: Dennis Remmert (14th season)
- Home stadium: UNI-Dome

1984 Association of Mid-Continent Universities football standings
	Conf.					Overall
Team	W		L		T	W		L		T
No. 18 Northern Iowa +	2	–	1	–	0	9	–	2	–	0
Eastern Illinois +	2	–	1	–	0	6	–	5	–	0
Southwest Missouri State	1	–	1	–	1	6	–	3	–	1
Western Illinois	0	–	2	–	1	6	–	4	–	1
+ – Conference co-champions; Rankings from NCAA Division I-AA Football Committee poll

The 1984 Northern Iowa Panthers football team was an American football team that represented the University of Northern Iowa as a member of the Association of Mid-Continent Universities (Mid-Con) during the 1984 NCAA Division I-AA football season. In its second season under head coach Darrell Mudra, the team compiled a 9–2 record (2–1 in conference games) and tied for the Mid-Con championship. The team's 73–7 victory over Wisconsin-Whitewater was the program's largest margin of victory since 1919, and the 49 points scored in the second half remains a school record.

Eight Northern Iowa players were honored as first-team players on the 1984 all-Mid-Con team: tight end Marty Bruder; offensive lineman Ralph Clark; running back Steve Harris; kicker Mike Molstead; defensive lineman Joe O'Brien; linebacker Mark Farley; defensive back Joe Fuller; and punter Clay Netusil. Four others were named to the second team. Fraley tallied 23 pass breakups, and Fuller tallied 17 pass breakups and five interceptions during the season. Steve Harris gained an average of 102.8 rushing yards per game and set the school's single-game record with 47 carries against Northwest Missouri State.

The team played its home games at the UNI-Dome in Cedar Falls, Iowa.

== Schedule ==
Date	Time	Opponent	Site	Result	Attendance	Source
September 1	7:00 p.m.	Winona State*	UNI-Dome; Cedar Falls, IA	W 37–0		
September 8	1:30 p.m.	at Drake*	Drake Stadium; Des Moines, IA	W 33–28	7,400	
September 22	1:30 p.m.	Southwest Missouri State^{†}	UNI-Dome; Cedar Falls, IA	W 24–10		
September 29	7:00 p.m.	Western Illinois	UNI-Dome; Cedar Falls, IA	W 30–17	11,200	
October 6	1:30 p.m.	at Southern Illinois*	McAndrew Stadium; Carbondale, IL	L 10–41	6,025	
October 13	7:00 p.m.	Wisconsin–Whitewater*	UNI-Dome; Cedar Falls, IA	W 73–7		
October 20	1:30 p.m.	at Youngstown State*	Stambaugh Stadium; Youngstown, OH	W 16–6		
October 27	7:00 p.m.	at Northern Michigan*	UNI-Dome; Cedar Falls, IA	W 44–24		
November 3	1:00 p.m.	at Eastern Illinois	O'Brien Stadium; Charleston, IL	L 17–27	2,200	
November 10	7:00 p.m.	Central Missouri*	UNI-Dome; Cedar Falls, IA	W 34–0	7,000	
November 17	7:00 p.m.	Northwest Missouri State*	UNI-Dome; Cedar Falls, IA	W 48–10		
*Non-conference game; ^{†}Homecoming; All times are in Central time
