= 1984 Northern Illinois Huskies football team =

American college football season

1984 Northern Illinois Huskies football
- Conference: Mid-American Conference
- Record: 4–6–1 (3–5–1 MAC)
- Head coach: Lee Corso (1st season)
- Offensive coordinator: Bill Lynch (1st season)
- Defensive coordinator: Ted Huber (1st season)
- MVPs: Scott Kellar; Pete Roth
- Captains: Dan Feely; Lee Hicks
- Home stadium: Huskie Stadium

1984 Mid-American Conference football standings
	Conf.					Overall
Team	W		L		T	W		L		T
Toledo $	7	–	1	–	1	8	–	3	–	1
Bowling Green	7	–	2	–	0	8	–	3	–	0
Central Michigan	6	–	2	–	1	8	–	2	–	1
Ohio	4	–	4	–	1	4	–	6	–	1
Northern Illinois	3	–	5	–	1	4	–	6	–	1
Miami (OH)	3	–	5	–	0	4	–	7	–	0
Ball State	3	–	5	–	0	3	–	8	–	0
Western Michigan	3	–	6	–	0	5	–	6	–	0
Kent State	3	–	6	–	0	4	–	7	–	0
Eastern Michigan	2	–	5	–	2	2	–	7	–	2
$ – Conference champion

The 1984 Northern Illinois Huskies football team represented Northern Illinois University as a member of the Mid-American Conference (MAC) during the 1984 NCAA Division I-A football season. Led by Lee Corso in his first and only season as head coach, the Huskies compiled an overall record of 4–6–1 with a mark of 3–5–1 in conference play, placing fifth in the MAC. Northern Illinois played home games at Huskie Stadium in DeKalb, Illinois.

Corso departed shortly after the season to become coach of the Orlando Renegades of the United States Football League.

== Schedule ==
Date	Opponent	Site	Result	Attendance	Source
September 1	West Texas State*	Huskie Stadium; DeKalb, IL	W 40–33		
September 8	at Wisconsin*	Camp Randall Stadium; Madison, WI	L 14–27	65,288	
September 22	Kent State	Huskie Stadium; DeKalb, IL	W 24–10	23,712	
September 29	Ball State	Huskie Stadium; DeKalb, IL (rivalry)	L 14–15	26,445	
October 6	at Western Michigan	Waldo Stadium; Kalamazoo, MI	W 20–15	18,221	
October 13	Eastern Michigan^{†}	Huskie Stadium; DeKalb, IL	T 10–10	26,685	
October 20	at Bowling Green	Doyt Perry Stadium; Bowling Green, OH	L 6–28		
October 27	Miami (OH)	Huskie Stadium; DeKalb, IL	L 7–20	10,200	
November 3	Central Michigan	Huskie Stadium; DeKalb, IL	W 8–7		
November 10	at Toledo	Glass Bowl; Toledo, OH	L 7–13	18,644	
November 17	at Ohio	Peden Stadium; Athens, OH	L 3–10		
*Non-conference game; ^{†}Homecoming
