= 1984 Eastern Kentucky Colonels football team =

American college football season

1984 Eastern Kentucky Colonels football

OVC champion

NCAA Division I-AA First Round, L 10–27 at Middle Tennessee
- Conference: Ohio Valley Conference
- Record: 8–4 (6–1 OVC)
- Head coach: Roy Kidd (21st season)
- Home stadium: Hanger Field

1984 Ohio Valley Conference football standings
	Conf.					Overall
Team	W		L		T	W		L		T
No. 8 Eastern Kentucky $^	6	–	1	–	0	8	–	4	–	0
No. 7 Middle Tennessee ^	5	–	2	–	0	11	–	3	–	0
No. 13 Murray State	5	–	2	–	0	9	–	2	–	0
Youngstown State	5	–	2	–	0	7	–	4	–	0
Austin Peay	4	–	3	–	0	7	–	4	–	0
Akron	2	–	5	–	0	4	–	7	–	0
Morehead State	1	–	6	–	0	2	–	9	–	0
Tennessee Tech	0	–	7	–	0	0	–	11	–	0
$ – Conference champion; ^ – NCAA Division I-AA playoff participant; Rankings from NCAA Division I-AA Football Committee poll

The 1984 Eastern Kentucky Colonels football team represented Eastern Kentucky University as a member of the Ohio Valley Conference (OVC) during the 1984 NCAA Division I-AA football season. Led by 21st-year head coach Roy Kidd, the Colonels compiled an overall record of 8–4 with a mark of 6–1 in conference play, winning the OVC title. Eastern Kentucky advanced to the NCAA Division I-AA Championship playoffs, where Colonels lost in the first round to fellow OVC member Middle Tennessee.

== Schedule ==
Date	Opponent	Rank	Site	Result	Attendance	Source
September 8	Youngstown State		Hanger Field; Richmond, KY	W 22–17	14,400	
September 15	at East Tennessee State*		Memorial Center; Johnson City, TN	L 7–10	9,072	
September 22	at Akron		Rubber Bowl; Akron, OH	W 22–21	15,131	
September 29	at Austin Peay	No. 17	Municipal Stadium; Clarksville, TN	W 20–3		
October 6	No. T–14 Middle Tennessee	No. 12	Hanger Field; Richmond, KY	L 10–22		
October 13	UCF*		Hanger Field; Richmond, KY	W 37–14	18,100	
October 20	at Western Kentucky*	No. T–17	L. T. Smith Stadium; Bowling Green, KY (rivalry)	L 10–17	13,000	
October 27	No. 10 Murray State		Hanger Field; Richmond, KY	W 27–14		
November 3	at Tennessee Tech	No. 16	Tucker Stadium; Cookeville, TN	W 21–14		
November 10	Morehead State	No. T–12	Hanger Field; Richmond, KY (rivalry)	W 48–38	8,600	
November 17	Florida A&M*	No. 10	Hanger Field; Richmond, KY	W 21–14		
November 24	No. 7 Middle Tennessee	No. 8	Hanger Field; Richmond, KY (NCAA Division I-AA First Round)	L 10–27	4,800	
*Non-conference game; Rankings from NCAA Division I-AA Football Committee Poll released prior to the game
