= 1984 Eastern Illinois Panthers football team =

American college football season

1984 Eastern Illinois Panthers football

Mid-Con champion
- Conference: Association of Mid-Continent Universities
- Record: 6–5 (2–1 Mid-Con)
- Head coach: Al Molde (2nd season)
- Home stadium: O'Brien Stadium

1984 Association of Mid-Continent Universities football standings
	Conf.					Overall
Team	W		L		T	W		L		T
No. 18 Northern Iowa +	2	–	1	–	0	9	–	2	–	0
Eastern Illinois +	2	–	1	–	0	6	–	5	–	0
Southwest Missouri State	1	–	1	–	1	6	–	3	–	1
Western Illinois	0	–	2	–	1	6	–	4	–	1
+ – Conference co-champions; Rankings from NCAA Division I-AA Football Committee poll

The 1984 Eastern Illinois Panthers football team represented Eastern Illinois University as a member of the Association of Mid-Continent Universities during the 1984 NCAA Division I-AA football season. Led by second-year head coach Al Molde, the Panthers compiled an overall record of 6–5 with a mark of 2–1 in conference play, sharing the Mid-Con title with Northern Iowa.

== Schedule ==
Date	Opponent	Site	Result	Attendance	Source
September 1	at Grand Valley State*	Lubbers Stadium; Allendale, MI	W 35–9	1,821	
September 8	at Indiana State*	Memorial Stadium; Terre Haute, IN	L 17–24	9,125	
September 15	Northeast Missouri State*	O'Brien Stadium; Charleston, IL	W 33–7	8,253	
September 22	at Toledo*	Glass Bowl; Toledo, OH	L 17–38	24,243	
September 29	Ferris State*	O'Brien Stadium; Charleston, IL	W 44–33	5,165	
October 6	Illinois State*	O'Brien Stadium; Charleston, IL	L 21–34	7,144	
October 13	Southern Illinois*	O'Brien Stadium; Charleston, IL	L 40–48	10,140	
October 20	at Western Illinois	Hanson Field; Macomb, IL	W 14–0	4,894	
October 27	at Southwest Missouri State	Briggs Stadium; Springfield, MO	L 28–29	7,018	
November 3	No. T–19 Northern Iowa	O'Brien Stadium; Charleston, IL	W 27–17	2,200	
November 10	Western Kentucky*	O'Brien Stadium; Charleston, IL	W 50–19	10,864	
*Non-conference game; Rankings from NCAA Division I-AA Football Committee Poll released prior to the game
