= 1984 Cal State Fullerton Titans football team =

American college football season

1984 Cal State Fullerton Titans football

PCAA champion
- Conference: Pacific Coast Athletic Association
- Record: 12–0 (7–0 PCAA)
- Head coach: Gene Murphy (5th season)
- Defensive coordinator: Bob Burt (5th season)
- Home stadium: Santa Ana Stadium

1984 Pacific Coast Athletic Association football standings
	Conf.					Overall
Team	W		L		T	W		L		T
Cal State Fullerton $	7	–	0	–	0	12	–	0	–	0
San Jose State	6	–	1	–	0	7	–	4	–	0
Fresno State	4	–	3	–	0	7	–	5	–	0
Long Beach State	4	–	3	–	0	5	–	6	–	0
Pacific (CA)	3	–	4	–	0	5	–	6	–	0
Utah State	2	–	5	–	0	2	–	9	–	0
New Mexico State	1	–	6	–	0	2	–	9	–	0
UNLV	0	–	7	–	0	0	–	13	–	0
$ – Conference champion; Records adjusted for UNLV's forfeit of all 11 victories

The 1984 Cal State Fullerton Titans football team represented California State University, Fullerton as a member of the Pacific Coast Athletic Association (PCAA) during the 1984 NCAA Division I-A football season. Led by fifth-year head coach Gene Murphy, Cal State Fullerton finished the season with an overall record of 11–1 and a mark of 6–1 in conference play, placing second in the PCAA behind UNLV, who dealt the Titans their only defeat of the season. Cal State Fullerton played its home games at Santa Ana Stadium in Santa Ana, California. This was the fourth home venue for the Titans in three years, but they continued playing in Santa Ana Stadium for the next eight season.

In March 1985, it was found that UNLV had used several ineligible players during the 1983 and 1984 seasons. As a result, UNLV was forced to forfeit all of their victories in those two seasons. With the forfeit from UNLV, Cal State Fullerton's 1984 record improved to 12–0 overall and 7–0 in conference play, giving the Titans the PCAA title. 1984 was the most successful of the Cal State Fullerton Titans football program's 23 seasons of competition.

== Schedule ==
Date	Opponent	Site	Result	Attendance	Source
September 1	at Boise State*	Bronco Stadium; Boise, ID	W 27–25	16,845	
September 8	at Hawaii*	Aloha Stadium; Halawa, HI	W 21–13	45,066	
September 15	Idaho*	Santa Ana Stadium; Santa Ana, CA	W 28–7	5,650	
September 22	at Colorado State*	Hughes Stadium; Fort Collins, CO	W 34–22	23,512	
September 29	Utah State	Santa Ana Stadium; Santa Ana, CA	W 27–16	6,262	
October 6	at Pacific (CA)	Pacific Memorial Stadium; Stockton, CA	W 41–31	19,567	
October 13	San Jose State^{†}	Santa Ana Stadium; Santa Ana, CA	W 21–12	9,260	
October 20	at Nevada*	Mackay Stadium; Reno, NA	W 36–14	11,026	
October 27	at Long Beach State	Veterans Stadium; Long Beach, CA	W 42–28	9,721	
November 3	Fresno State	Santa Ana Stadium; Santa Ana, CA	W 20–17	12,121	
November 10	at UNLV	Sam Boyd Silver Bowl; Whitney, NV	W 0–20 (forfeit win)	25,678	
November 17	at New Mexico State	Aggie Memorial Stadium; Las Cruces, NM	W 20–0	8,634	
*Non-conference game; ^{†}Homecoming

== Team players in the NFL ==
The following Cal State Fullerton Titans were selected in the 1985 NFL draft.

Player	Position	Round	Overall	NFL team
Daren Gilbert	Tackle	2	38	New Orleans Saints
Andre Pinesett	Defensive tackle	10	256	Indianapolis Colts

The following finished their college career in 1984, were not drafted, but played in the NFL. (Note: Starting quarterback Damon Allen did not play in the NFL, but played in the Canadian Football League (CFL) for 23 years and was elected to the Canadian Football Hall of Fame in 2012.)

Player	Position	First NFL team
Marv Williams	Tight end	1987 Washington Redskins
Vincent Gamache	Punter	1986 Seattle Seahawks
