= 1984 Eastern Michigan Hurons football team =

American college football season

1984 Eastern Michigan Hurons football
- Conference: Mid-American Conference
- Record: 2–7–2 (2–5–2 MAC)
- Head coach: Jim Harkema (2nd season)
- Captain: Game captains
- Home stadium: Rynearson Stadium

1984 Mid-American Conference football standings
	Conf.					Overall
Team	W		L		T	W		L		T
Toledo $	7	–	1	–	1	8	–	3	–	1
Bowling Green	7	–	2	–	0	8	–	3	–	0
Central Michigan	6	–	2	–	1	8	–	2	–	1
Ohio	4	–	4	–	1	4	–	6	–	1
Northern Illinois	3	–	5	–	1	4	–	6	–	1
Miami (OH)	3	–	5	–	0	4	–	7	–	0
Ball State	3	–	5	–	0	3	–	8	–	0
Western Michigan	3	–	6	–	0	5	–	6	–	0
Kent State	3	–	6	–	0	4	–	7	–	0
Eastern Michigan	2	–	5	–	2	2	–	7	–	2
$ – Conference champion

The 1984 Eastern Michigan Hurons football team represented Eastern Michigan University in the 1984 NCAA Division I-A football season. In their second season under head coach Jim Harkema, the Hurons compiled a 2–7–2 record (2–5–2 against conference opponents), finished in last place in the Mid-American Conference, and were outscored by their opponents, 221 to 151. The team's statistical leaders included Robert Gordon with 949 passing yards, Gary Patton with 566 rushing yards, and Derrin Powell with 261 receiving yards.

== Schedule ==
Date	Opponent	Site	Result	Attendance	Source
September 1	at Youngstown State*	Stambaugh Stadium; Youngstown, OH	L 7–31		
September 15	at Marshall*	Fairfield Stadium; Huntington, WV	L 17–24		
September 22	Ohio	Rynearson Stadium; Ypsilanti, MI	L 13–16	19,281	
September 29	at Bowling Green	Doyt Perry Stadium; Bowling Green, OH	L 27–35		
October 6	Central Michigan	Rynearson Stadium; Ypsilanti, MI (rivalry)	T 16–16		
October 13	at Northern Illinois	Huskie Stadium; DeKalb, IL	T 10–10	26,685	
October 20	at Toledo	Glass Bowl; Toledo, OH	L 7–17		
October 27	Ball State^{†}	Rynearson Stadium; Ypsilanti, MI	L 10–17		
November 3	Kent State	Rynearson Stadium; Ypsilanti, MI	W 20–18		
November 10	at Miami (OH)	Yager Stadium; Oxford, OH	L 0–23	23,268	
November 17	Western Michigan	Rynearson Stadium; Ypsilanti, MI	W 24–14		
*Non-conference game; ^{†}Homecoming
