= 1984 Long Beach State 49ers football team =

American college football season

1984 Long Beach State 49ers football
- Conference: Pacific Coast Athletic Association
- Record: 5–6 (4–3 PCAA)
- Head coach: Mike Sheppard (1st season)
- Defensive coordinator: Ken Visser (4th season)
- Home stadium: Veterans Stadium

1984 Pacific Coast Athletic Association football standings
	Conf.					Overall
Team	W		L		T	W		L		T
Cal State Fullerton $	7	–	0	–	0	12	–	0	–	0
San Jose State	6	–	1	–	0	7	–	4	–	0
Fresno State	4	–	3	–	0	7	–	5	–	0
Long Beach State	4	–	3	–	0	5	–	6	–	0
Pacific (CA)	3	–	4	–	0	5	–	6	–	0
Utah State	2	–	5	–	0	2	–	9	–	0
New Mexico State	1	–	6	–	0	2	–	9	–	0
UNLV	0	–	7	–	0	0	–	13	–	0
$ – Conference champion; Records adjusted for UNLV's forfeit of all 11 victories

The 1984 Long Beach State 49ers football team represented California State University, Long Beach (Note: The official name of Long Beach State has been California State University, Long Beach since 1972. However, it is still commonly known as Long Beach State.) during the 1984 NCAA Division I-A football season.

The 49er's passing attack was the strength of the 1984 squad. Led by Junior quarterback Doug Gaynor who passed for 3230 yards (323 per game - third nationally) 16TD's and a strong receiving corps led by wide receivers Charles Lockett (75 catches 1112 yards and 4 TD's), Troy Ory (42-669-3), tight end Greg Locy (31-496-2) and running back Mark Templeton (459 yards rushing and 451 yards receiving). The defense was led by future third round draft pick John Hendy at cornerback and leading tackler Marc Bevilacqua at middle linebacker.

Long Beach State played a tough non-conference schedule including three Pac-10 schools (Oregon, UCLA and Arizona). The 49ers played each of those opponents close, losing games by an average of 8 points. The most exciting victory of the season came in their final game against the San Diego St. Aztecs by a score of 18-17 after converting a 2-point play to seal the win.

Cal State Long Beach competed in the Pacific Coast Athletic Association. (Note: The Big West Conference was known as the Pacific Coast Athletic Association from its founding in 1969 through 1987.) The team was led by first-year head coach Mike Sheppard, and played home games at Veterans Stadium adjacent to the campus of Long Beach City College in Long Beach, California. On the field, they finished the season with a record of four wins and seven losses (4–7, 3–4 PCAA).

After the season was over, it was discovered that the UNLV Rebels had used multiple ineligible players during both the 1983 and 1984 season. As a result, Long Beach's loss to UNLV turns into a forfeit win and their record is adjusted to 5–6, 4–3 PCAA.

== Schedule ==
Date	Time	Opponent	Site	Result	Attendance	Source
September 8	1:00 pm	at Oregon*	Autzen Stadium; Eugene, OR	L 17–28	23,044	
September 15	4:00 pm	at No. 7 UCLA*	Rose Bowl; Pasadena, CA	L 17–23	40,132	
September 22	7:30 pm	at Fresno State	Bulldog Stadium; Fresno, CA	L 17–20	31,162	
September 29	5:00 pm	at Arizona*	Arizona Stadium; Tucson, AZ	L 24–31	41,910	
October 6	1:30 pm	UNLV	Veterans Memorial Stadium; Long Beach, CA	W 23–41 (forfeit win)	7,216	
October 13	12:30 pm	at Utah State	Romney Stadium; Logan, UT	W 24–22	9,586	
October 20	6:30 pm	at New Mexico State	Aggie Memorial Stadium; Las Cruces, NM	W 43–13	12,155	
October 27	1:30 pm	Cal State Fullerton	Veterans Memorial Stadium; Long Beach, CA	L 28–42	9,721	
November 3	1:30 pm	Pacific (CA)	Veterans Memorial Stadium; Long Beach, CA	W 24–22	5,841	
November 10	7:00 pm	at San Jose State	Spartan Stadium; San Jose, CA	L 7–42	4,444	
November 24	7:00 pm	at San Diego State*	Jack Murphy Stadium; San Diego, CA	W 18–17	10,949	
*Non-conference game; Rankings from AP Poll released prior to the game; All times are in Pacific time

== Roster ==
1984 Long Beach State 49ers football team roster
Players
Coaches
Offense

Pos.	#	Name	Class
QB	19	Doug Gaynor	Jr
RB	34	Martin Sartin	Jr
RB	25	Mark Templeton	So
WR	1	Charles Lockett	So
WR	80	Troy Ory	Jr
TE	89	Greg Locy	So
OT	78	Chuck Page	Sr
G	66	Dickson Falefia	Jr
C	55	John Stapleton	Jr

Defense

Pos.	#	Name	Class
DE	84	Tom Hensley	Jr
DE	64	Chuck Meierbachtol	Jr
LB	33	Marc Bevilacqua	Sr
LB	32	Kevin Moore	Jr
LB	86	Kevin Junior	Sr
CB	17	John Hendy	Sr

Special teams

Pos.	#	Name	Class
KR	8	Sheldon Gaines	Jr

Head coach

Coordinators/assistant coaches

Legend

- (C) Team captain
- (S) Suspended
- (I) Ineligible
- Injured
- Redshirt

== Team players in the NFL ==
The following were selected in the 1985 NFL draft.

Player	Position	Round	Overall	NFL team
John Hendy	Defensive back	3	69	San Diego Chargers
