= 1984 Western Michigan Broncos football team =

American college football season

1984 Western Michigan Broncos football
- Conference: Mid-American Conference
- Record: 5–6 (3–6 MAC)
- Head coach: Jack Harbaugh (3rd season)
- Offensive coordinator: Steve Szabo (3rd season)
- MVP: John Offerdahl
- Captains: Jeff Kacmarek; Tom Toth
- Home stadium: Waldo Stadium

1984 Mid-American Conference football standings
	Conf.					Overall
Team	W		L		T	W		L		T
Toledo $	7	–	1	–	1	8	–	3	–	1
Bowling Green	7	–	2	–	0	8	–	3	–	0
Central Michigan	6	–	2	–	1	8	–	2	–	1
Ohio	4	–	4	–	1	4	–	6	–	1
Northern Illinois	3	–	5	–	1	4	–	6	–	1
Miami (OH)	3	–	5	–	0	4	–	7	–	0
Ball State	3	–	5	–	0	3	–	8	–	0
Western Michigan	3	–	6	–	0	5	–	6	–	0
Kent State	3	–	6	–	0	4	–	7	–	0
Eastern Michigan	2	–	5	–	2	2	–	7	–	2
$ – Conference champion

The 1984 Western Michigan Broncos football team represented Western Michigan University in the Mid-American Conference (MAC) during the 1984 NCAA Division I-A football season. In their third season under head coach Jack Harbaugh, the Broncos compiled a 5–6 record (3–6 against MAC opponents), finished in a tie for eighth place in the MAC, and outscored their opponents, 234 to 213. The team played its home games at Waldo Stadium in Kalamazoo, Michigan.

The team's statistical leaders included Steve Hoffman with 1,732 passing yards, Otis Cheathem with 778 rushing yards, and Cliff Reed with 591 receiving yards. Defensive tackle Jeff Kacmarek and tackle Tom Toth were the team captains. Linebacker John Offerdahl received the team's most outstanding player award.

== Schedule ==
Date	Opponent	Site	Result	Attendance	Source
September 8	Miami (OH)	Waldo Stadium; Kalamazoo, MI	W 17–13	12,873	
September 15	Illinois State*	Waldo Stadium; Kalamazoo, MI	W 41–14	10,524	
September 22	at Central Michigan	Kelly/Shorts Stadium; Mount Pleasant, MI (rivalry)	L 19–38	28,463	
September 29	Marshall*	Waldo Stadium; Kalamazoo, MI	W 42–7		
October 6	Northern Illinois	Waldo Stadium; Kalamazoo, MI	L 15–20	18,221	
October 13	at Bowling Green	Doyt Perry Stadium; Bowling Green, OH	L 7–34		
October 20	at Ball State	Ball State Stadium; Muncie, IN	L 20–23		
October 27	Ohio	Waldo Stadium; Kalamazoo, MI	W 33–14	15,219	
November 3	at Toledo	Glass Bowl; Toledo, OH	L 13–17		
November 10	Kent State	Dix Stadium; Kent, OH	W 13–9		
November 17	at Eastern Michigan	Rynearson Stadium; Ypsilanti, MI	L 14–24		
*Non-conference game
