= 1984 Bowling Green Falcons football team =

American college football season

1984 Bowling Green Falcons football
- Conference: Mid-American Conference
- Record: 8–3 (7–2 MAC)
- Head coach: Denny Stolz (8th season)
- Home stadium: Doyt Perry Stadium

1984 Mid-American Conference football standings
	Conf.					Overall
Team	W		L		T	W		L		T
Toledo $	7	–	1	–	1	8	–	3	–	1
Bowling Green	7	–	2	–	0	8	–	3	–	0
Central Michigan	6	–	2	–	1	8	–	2	–	1
Ohio	4	–	4	–	1	4	–	6	–	1
Northern Illinois	3	–	5	–	1	4	–	6	–	1
Miami (OH)	3	–	5	–	0	4	–	7	–	0
Ball State	3	–	5	–	0	3	–	8	–	0
Western Michigan	3	–	6	–	0	5	–	6	–	0
Kent State	3	–	6	–	0	4	–	7	–	0
Eastern Michigan	2	–	5	–	2	2	–	7	–	2
$ – Conference champion

The 1984 Bowling Green Falcons football team was an American football team that represented Bowling Green University in the Mid-American Conference (MAC) during the 1984 NCAA Division I-A football season. In their eighth season under head coach Denny Stolz, the Falcons compiled an 8–3 record (7–2 against MAC opponents), finished in second place in the MAC, and outscored their opponents by a combined total of 327 to 198.

The team's statistical leaders included Brian McClure with 2,951 passing yards, Bernard White with 1,036 rushing yards, and Stan Hunter with 744 receiving yards.

== Schedule ==
Date	Opponent	Site	Result	Attendance	Source
September 8	Richmond*	Doyt Perry Stadium; Bowling Green, OH	W 55–28	14,023	
September 15	at No. 13 Oklahoma State*	Lewis Field; Stillwater, OK	L 14–31	46,000	
September 22	at Miami (OH)	Yager Stadium; Oxford, OH	W 41–10		
September 29	Eastern Michigan	Doyt Perry Stadium; Bowling Green, OH	W 35–27		
October 6	at Toledo	Glass Bowl; Toledo, OH (rivalry)	L 6–17		
October 13	Western Michigan	Doyt Perry Stadium; Bowling Green, OH	W 34–7		
October 20	Northern Illinois	Doyt Perry Stadium; Bowling Green, OH	W 28–6		
October 27	at Central Michigan	Kelly/Shorts Stadium; Mount Pleasant, MI	L 21–42	22,841	
November 3	at Ball State	Ball State Stadium; Muncie, IN	W 38–13		
November 10	Ohio	Doyt Perry Stadium; Bowling Green, OH	W 28–7		
November 17	at Kent State	Dix Stadium; Kent, OH (rivalry)	W 27–10		
*Non-conference game; Rankings from AP Poll released prior to the game
