= 1984 Utah State Aggies football team =

American college football season

1984 Utah State Aggies football
- Conference: Pacific Coast Athletic Association
- Record: 2–9 (2–5 PCAA)
- Head coach: Chris Pella (2nd season)
- Defensive coordinator: Kent Baer (2nd season)
- Home stadium: Romney Stadium

1984 Pacific Coast Athletic Association football standings
	Conf.					Overall
Team	W		L		T	W		L		T
Cal State Fullerton $	7	–	0	–	0	12	–	0	–	0
San Jose State	6	–	1	–	0	7	–	4	–	0
Fresno State	4	–	3	–	0	7	–	5	–	0
Long Beach State	4	–	3	–	0	5	–	6	–	0
Pacific (CA)	3	–	4	–	0	5	–	6	–	0
Utah State	2	–	5	–	0	2	–	9	–	0
New Mexico State	1	–	6	–	0	2	–	9	–	0
UNLV	0	–	7	–	0	0	–	13	–	0
$ – Conference champion; Records adjusted for UNLV's forfeit of all 11 victories

The 1984 Utah State Aggies football team represented Utah State University during the 1984 NCAA Division I-A football season as a member of the Pacific Coast Athletic Association (PCAA). The Aggies were led by second-year head coach Chris Pella and played their home games at Romney Stadium in Logan, Utah. They finished the season with a record of one win and ten losses (2–9, 2–5 PCAA).

== Schedule ==
Date	Opponent	Site	Result	Attendance	Source
September 8	at USC*	Los Angeles Memorial Coliseum; Los Angeles, CA	L 7–42	45,067	
September 15	TCU*	Romney Stadium; Logan, UT	L 18–62	12,009	
September 29	at Cal State Fullerton	Santa Ana Stadium; Santa Ana, CA	L 16–27	6,262	
October 6	at San Jose State	Spartan Stadium; San Jose, CA	L 21–38	14,667	
October 13	Long Beach State	Romney Stadium; Logan, UT	L 22–24	9,589	
October 20	at Fresno State	Bulldog Stadium; Fresno, CA	L 18–43	31,463	
October 27	Pacific (CA)	Romney Stadium; Logan, UT	W 41–14	8,597	
November 3	at Arizona*	Arizona Stadium; Tucson, AZ	L 10–45	44,225	
November 10	Utah*	Romney Stadium; Logan, UT (Battle of the Brothers)	L 10–21	11,937	
November 17	UNLV	Romney Stadium; Logan, UT	W 20–36 (forfeit win)	6,279	
November 24	at No. 1 BYU*	Cougar Stadium; Provo, UT (rivalry)	L 13–38	65,580	
*Non-conference game; Rankings from AP Poll released prior to the game
