= Bob Cope =

American football player and coach (1936–1997)

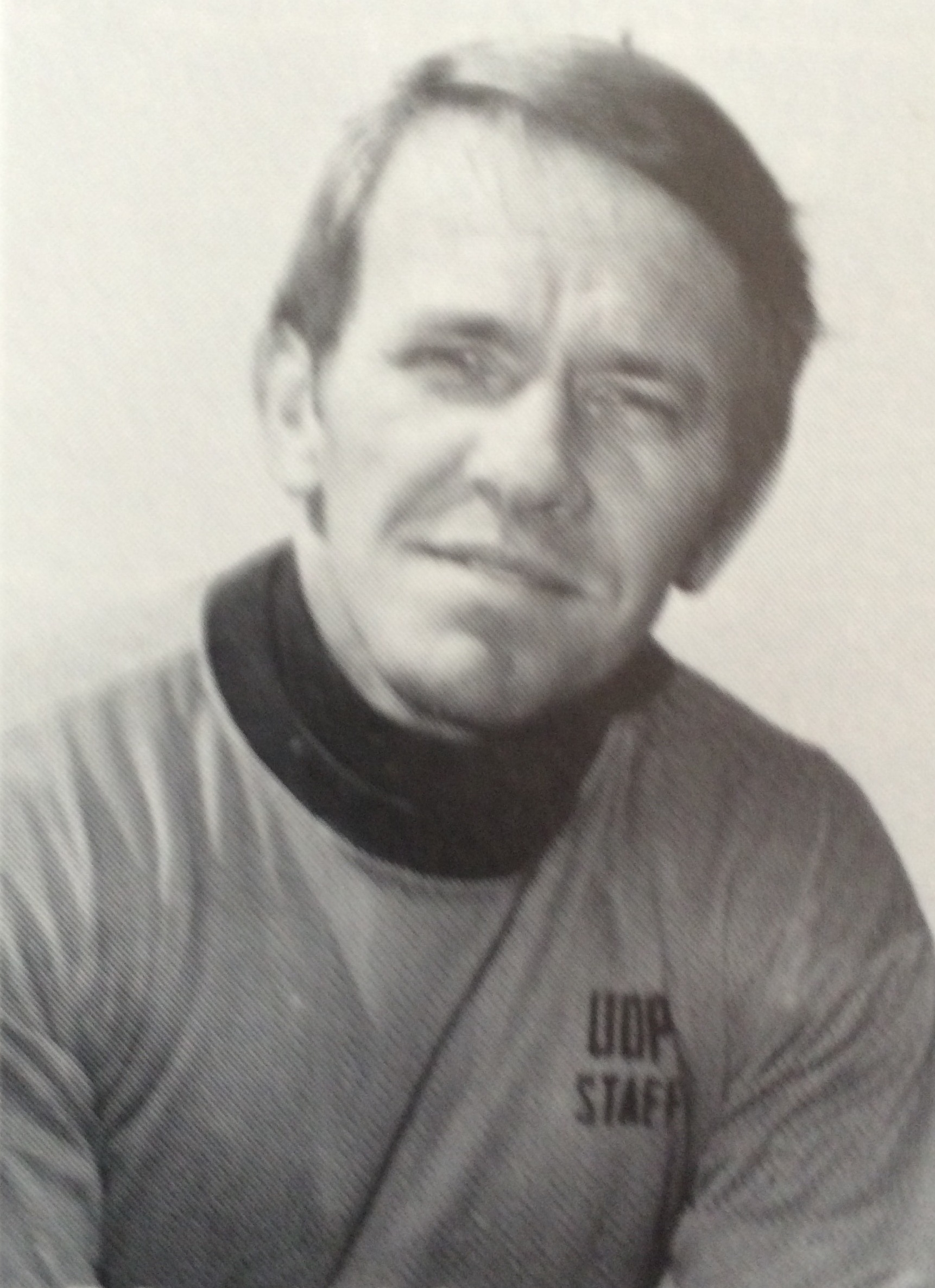
- Cope, circa 1970s

Biographical details
- Born: November 6, 1936
- Died: August 3, 1997 (aged 60); Manhattan, Kansas, U.S.

Playing career
- c. 1960: Carson–Newman

Coaching career (HC unless noted)
- 1964–1971: Vanderbilt (assistant)
- 1972–1975: Pacific (CA) (AHC/DC)
- 1976: SMU (DL)
- 1977–1979: Arkansas (DB/RC)
- 1980: Arkansas (DC)
- 1981: Ole Miss (LB)
- 1982: Purdue (DC)
- 1983–1988: Pacific (CA)
- 1989–1990: Kansas State (DC)
- 1991–1992: USC (DB)
- 1993: Baylor (DB)
- 1994: Baylor (DC/DB)
- 1995: Baylor (AHC/DB)
- 1996: Kansas State (DC)

Head coaching record
- Overall: 22–46

Bob Cope (November 6, 1936 – August 3, 1997) was an American football coach. In a 32-year career, he served as assistant coach at Vanderbilt, SMU, Arkansas, Ole Miss, Purdue, Pacific, USC, Baylor, and Kansas State. During his career, he coached 23 nationally ranked defenses and participated in eight bowl games.

A native of Chattanooga, Tennessee, he played college football at Carson–Newman College, and was inducted posthumously into the Carson–Newman Athletic Hall of Fame in 2002.

Cope was an assistant coach at University of the Pacific for Chester Caddas in the early 1970s. His only stint as head coach came at Pacific (1983–1988), where he had a 22–46 record.

Cope was diagnosed with cancer in September 1996. He died at Mercy Health Center in Manhattan, Kansas.

== Head coaching record ==
Year	Team	Overall	Conference	Standing	Bowl/playoffs
Pacific Tigers (Pacific Coast Athletic Association / Big West Conference) (1983–1988)
1983	Pacific	3–9	1–5	7th	
1984	Pacific	4–7	2–5	6th	
1985	Pacific	5–7	2–5	7th	
1986	Pacific	4–7	2–5	T–6th	
1987	Pacific	4–7	3–4	6th	
1988	Pacific	2–9	2–5	7th	
Pacific:		22–46	12–29		
Total:		22–46			
