= 1984 Austin Peay Governors football team =

American college football season

1984 Austin Peay Governors football
- Conference: Ohio Valley Conference
- Record: 7–4 (4–3 OVC)
- Head coach: Emory Hale (4th season)
- Home stadium: Municipal Stadium

1984 Ohio Valley Conference football standings
	Conf.					Overall
Team	W		L		T	W		L		T
No. 8 Eastern Kentucky $^	6	–	1	–	0	8	–	4	–	0
No. 7 Middle Tennessee ^	5	–	2	–	0	11	–	3	–	0
No. 13 Murray State	5	–	2	–	0	9	–	2	–	0
Youngstown State	5	–	2	–	0	7	–	4	–	0
Austin Peay	4	–	3	–	0	7	–	4	–	0
Akron	2	–	5	–	0	4	–	7	–	0
Morehead State	1	–	6	–	0	2	–	9	–	0
Tennessee Tech	0	–	7	–	0	0	–	11	–	0
$ – Conference champion; ^ – NCAA Division I-AA playoff participant; Rankings from NCAA Division I-AA Football Committee poll

The 1984 Austin Peay Governors football team represented Austin Peay State University as a member of the Ohio Valley Conference (OVC) during the 1984 NCAA Division I-AA football season. Led by fourth-year head coach Emory Hale, the Governors compiled an overall record of 7–4, with a mark of 4–3 in conference play, and finished fifth in the OVC.

== Schedule ==
Date	Opponent	Site	Result	Attendance	Source
September 8	Tennessee–Martin*	Municipal Stadium; Clarksville, TN	W 13–10		
September 15	Kentucky State*	Municipal Stadium; Clarksville, TN	W 14–0	5,200	
September 22	at Nicholls State*	John L. Guidry Stadium; Thibodaux, LA	L 6–31		
September 29	No. 17 Eastern Kentucky	Municipal Stadium; Clarksville, TN	L 3–20		
October 6	Morehead State	Municipal Stadium; Clarksville, TN	W 21–14		
October 13	Youngstown State	Municipal Stadium; Clarksville, TN	L 13–16 ^{OT}	5,850	
October 20	at No. 5 Middle Tennessee	Johnny "Red" Floyd Stadium; Murfreesboro, TN	W 16–7	12,500	
October 27	at UCF*	Florida Citrus Bowl; Orlando, FL	W 24–21	12,225	
November 3	at No. 17 Murray State	Roy Stewart Stadium; Murray, KY	L 13–20 ^{OT}		
November 10	Tennessee Tech	Municipal Stadium; Clarksville, TN	W 27–7	4,500	
November 17	at Akron	Rubber Bowl; Akron, OH	W 21–17		
*Non-conference game; Rankings from NCAA Division I-AA Football Committee Poll released prior to the game
