= 1984 Wichita State Shockers football team =

American college football season

1984 Wichita State Shockers football
- Conference: Missouri Valley Conference
- Record: 3–8 (2–3 MVC)
- Head coach: Ron Chismar (1st season)
- Offensive coordinator: Fayne Henson (3rd season)
- Offensive scheme: Pro-style
- Defensive coordinator: Wayne Donner (1st season)
- Base defense: 5–2
- Home stadium: Cessna Stadium

1984 Missouri Valley Conference football standings
	Conf.					Overall
Team	W		L		T	W		L		T
Tulsa $	5	–	0	–	0	6	–	5	–	0
No. 5 Indiana State ^	4	–	1	–	0	9	–	3	–	0
Illinois State	3	–	2	–	0	5	–	6	–	0
West Texas State	2	–	3	–	0	3	–	8	–	0
Wichita State	2	–	3	–	0	2	–	9	–	0
Drake	2	–	3	–	0	4	–	7	–	0
Southern Illinois	0	–	5	–	0	3	–	8	–	0
$ – Conference champion; ^ – NCAA Division I-AA playoff participant; Indiana State's game against Louisville and West Texas State and Wichita State's games against New Mexico State counted in the conference standings. The conference was a hybrid of NCAA Division I-A and I-AA programs. Tulsa and Wichita State were I-A and the other teams were I-AA.; Rankings from NCAA Division I-AA Football Committee poll

The 1984 Wichita State Shockers football team was an American football team that represented Wichita State as a member of the Missouri Valley Conference during the 1984 NCAA Division I-A football season. In their first year under head coach Ron Chismar, the team compiled a 2–9 record.

== Schedule ==
Date	Opponent	Site	TV	Result	Attendance	Source
September 1	Southwest Texas State*	Cessna Stadium; Wichita, KS		L 31–38	27,481	
September 8	at Kansas*	Memorial Stadium; Lawrence, KS		L 7–31	33,200	
September 15	at LSU*	Tiger Stadium; Baton Rouge, LA	TigerVision	L 7–47	78,026	
September 22	at UNLV*	Sam Boyd Silver Bowl; Whitney, NV		W 21–38 (forfeit win)	17,481	
October 6	at Southwestern Louisiana*	Cajun Field; Lafayette, LA		L 3–31	21,507	
October 13	UT Arlington*	Cessna Stadium; Wichita, KS		L 15–17	15,234	
October 20	at Tulsa	Skelly Stadium; Tulsa, OK		L 20–55	12,261	
October 27	at Drake	Drake Stadium; Des Moines, IA		W 23–6	7,480	
November 3	New Mexico State (Note: Designated conference game)	Cessna Stadium; Wichita, KS		L 24–31	13,303	
November 10	West Texas State	Cessna Stadium; Wichita, KS		W 17–14	8,106	
November 17	Illinois State	Cessna Stadium; Wichita, KS		L 0–17	1,100	
*Non-conference game
