= 1984 Toledo Rockets football team =

American college football season

1984 Toledo Rockets football

MAC champion

California Bowl, W 13–30 (forfeit win) vs. UNLV
- Conference: Mid-American Conference
- Record: 9–2–1 (7–1–1 MAC)
- Head coach: Dan Simrell (3rd season)
- Home stadium: Glass Bowl

1984 Mid-American Conference football standings
	Conf.					Overall
Team	W		L		T	W		L		T
Toledo $	7	–	1	–	1	8	–	3	–	1
Bowling Green	7	–	2	–	0	8	–	3	–	0
Central Michigan	6	–	2	–	1	8	–	2	–	1
Ohio	4	–	4	–	1	4	–	6	–	1
Northern Illinois	3	–	5	–	1	4	–	6	–	1
Miami (OH)	3	–	5	–	0	4	–	7	–	0
Ball State	3	–	5	–	0	3	–	8	–	0
Western Michigan	3	–	6	–	0	5	–	6	–	0
Kent State	3	–	6	–	0	4	–	7	–	0
Eastern Michigan	2	–	5	–	2	2	–	7	–	2
$ – Conference champion

The 1984 Toledo Rockets football team was an American football team that represented the University of Toledo in the Mid-American Conference (MAC) during the 1984 NCAA Division I-A football season. In their third season under head coach Dan Simrell, the Rockets compiled an 9–2–1 record (7–1–1 against MAC opponents), won the MAC championship, lost to L 13–30 vs. UNLV in the California Bowl (13–30), and outscored all opponents by a combined total of 187 to 164. The team subsequently gained a win in the California Bowl after UNLV forfeited all of its victories from their 1983 and 1984 seasons due to playing with ineligible players.

The team's statistical leaders included A. J. Sager with 1,647 passing yards, Steve Morgan with 1,291 rushing yards, and Eric Hutchinson with 451 receiving yards.

== Schedule ==
Date	Opponent	Site	Result	Attendance	Source
September 8	at Ball State	Ball State Stadium; Muncie, IN	W 20–2		
September 22	Eastern Illinois*	Glass Bowl; Toledo, OH	W 38–17	24,243	
September 29	at Ohio	Peden Stadium; Athens, OH	T 16–16		
October 6	Bowling Green	Glass Bowl; Toledo, OH (rivalry)	W 17–6		
October 13	at Miami (OH)	Yager Stadium; Oxford, OH	W 10–7	21,395	
October 20	Eastern Michigan	Glass Bowl; Toledo, OH	W 17–7		
October 27	at Kent State	Dix Stadium; Kent, OH	L 6–17		
November 3	Western Michigan	Glass Bowl; Toledo, OH	W 17–13		
November 10	Northern Illinois	Glass Bowl; Toledo, OH	W 13–7	18,644	
November 17	at Central Michigan	Kelly/Shorts Stadium; Mount Pleasant, MI	W 14–7		
November 30	vs. Temple*	Atlantic City Convention Hall; Atlantic City, NJ	L 6–35	5,586	
December 15	vs. UNLV*	Bulldog Stadium; Fresno, CA (California Bowl)	W 13–30 (forfeit win)	21,741	
*Non-conference game
