= 1984 UCF Knights football team =

American college football season

1984 UCF Knights football
- Conference: Independent
- Record: 2–9
- Head coach: Lou Saban (2nd season; first 7 games); Jerry Anderson (interim, final 4 games)
- Home stadium: Florida Citrus Bowl

1984 NCAA Division II independents football records
| | Conf. | | | Overall |
| Team | W | L | T | W | | L | | T |
|---|---|---|---|---|---|---|---|---|
| No. T–3 Central State (OH) ^ | | – | | 9 | – | 2 | – | 0 |
| No. 8 Towson State ^ | | – | | 9 | – | 4 | – | 0 |
| Southern Connecticut State | | – | | 7 | – | 3 | – | 0 |
| Central Connecticut | | – | | 6 | – | 4 | – | 0 |
| Northern Michigan | | – | | 6 | – | 4 | – | 0 |
| New Haven | | – | | 5 | – | 5 | – | 0 |
| Liberty | | – | | 5 | – | 6 | – | 0 |
| Saint Mary's | | – | | 5 | – | 6 | – | 0 |
| American International | | – | | 4 | – | 6 | – | 0 |
| Springfield | | – | | 3 | – | 7 | – | 0 |
| Kentucky State | | – | | 2 | – | 9 | – | 0 |
| UCF | | – | | 2 | – | 9 | – | 0 |
^ – NCAA Division II playoff participant; Rankings from NCAA Division II Football Committee poll

The 1984 UCF Knights football season was the sixth season for the team. It was Lou Saban's second and final season as the head coach of the Knights. After a disappointing 1–6 start to the season, Saban stepped away from the program, and was replaced by assistant coach Jerry "Red" Anderson. The Knights finished the year with a 2–9 overall record, facing a schedule entirely made up of Division I-AA opponents. The program had actually petitioned the NCAA to move the football program up to I-AA for 1984, but the move was delayed, in part due to costs and incurred debt. The move would not happen until 1990.

The Knights competed as an NCAA Division II Independent. The team played their home games at the Citrus Bowl in downtown Orlando.

In their October 20 game against Illinois State, the Knights fell behind 21–0 in the first quarter. UCF rallied for a 28–24 victory, their largest comeback win in school history. As of 2021, it is still tied for the program's best comeback win.

== Schedule ==
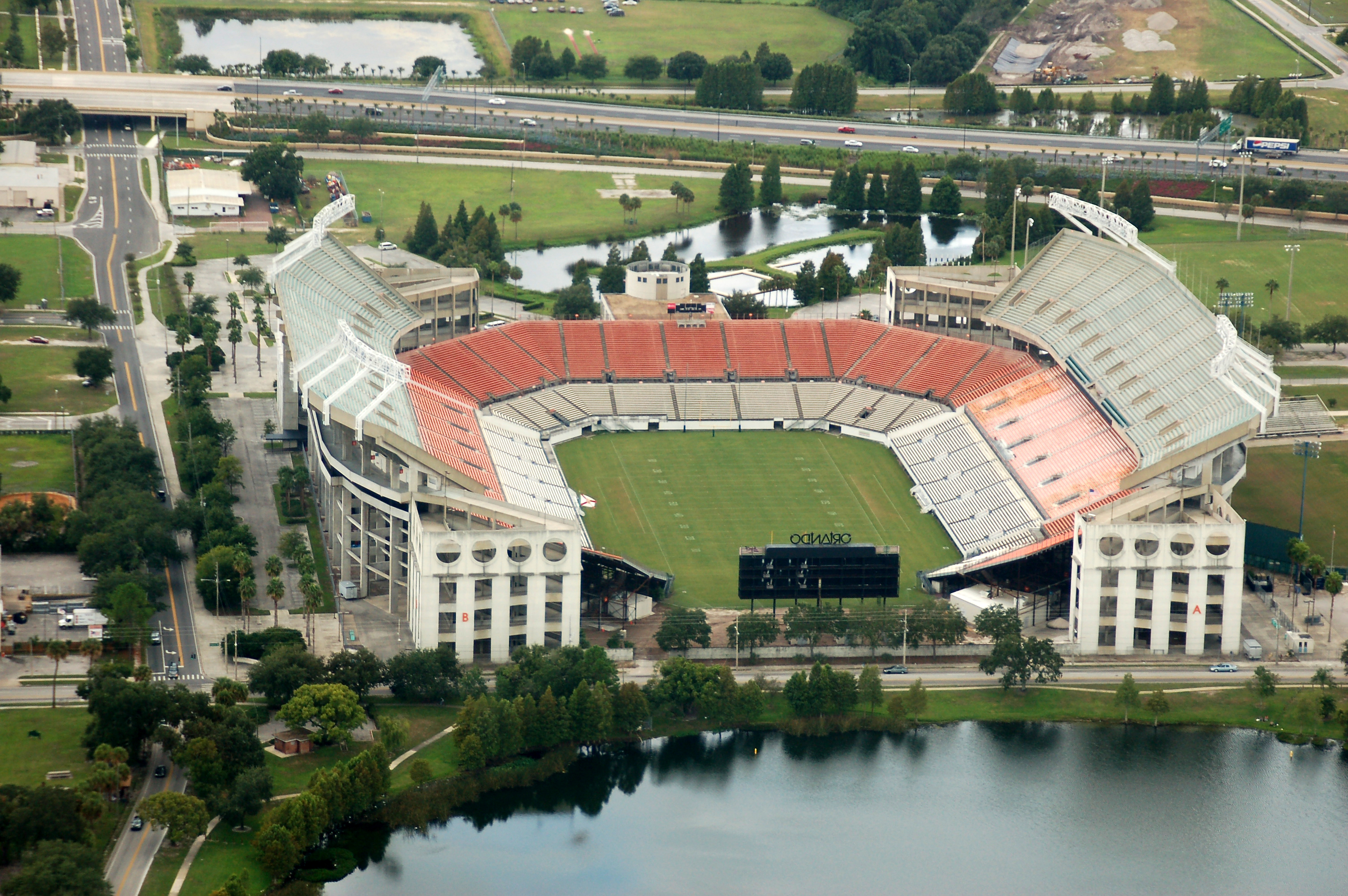
The Florida Citrus Bowl, the Knights' home field

| Date | Opponent | Site | Result | Attendance | Source |
|---|---|---|---|---|---|
| September 1 | Bethune–Cookman | Florida Citrus Bowl; Orlando, FL | L 22–43 | 7,421 | |
| September 8 | at Northeast Louisiana | Malone Stadium; Monroe, LA | L 21–49 | 19,329 | |
| September 15 | Georgia Southern | Florida Citrus Bowl; Orlando, FL | L 28–42 | 7,124 | |
| September 22 | at Western Kentucky | L. T. Smith Stadium; Bowling Green, KY | W 35–34 | 8,500 | |
| September 29 | at Southwest Texas State | Bobcat Stadium; San Marcos, TX | L 13–39 | 10,337 | |
| October 6 | Akron | Florida Citrus Bowl; Orlando, FL | L 21–26 | 6,814 | |
| October 13 | at Eastern Kentucky | Roy Kidd Stadium; Richmond, KY | L 14–37 | 18,100 | |
| October 20 | Illinois State | Florida Citrus Bowl; Orlando, FL | W 28–24 | 11,648 | |
| October 27 | Austin Peay | Florida Citrus Bowl; Orlando, FL | L 21–24 | 12,225 | |
| November 3 | at Indiana State | Memorial Stadium; Terre Haute, IN | L 0–38 | 8,367 | |
| November 10 | at Furman | Paladin Stadium; Greenville, SC | L 6–42 | 10,162 | |
