= 1984 Ball State Cardinals football team =

American college football season

1984 Ball State Cardinals football
- Conference: Mid-American Conference
- Record: 3–8 (3–5 MAC)
- Head coach: Dwight Wallace (7th season)
- Home stadium: Ball State Stadium

1984 Mid-American Conference football standings
	Conf.					Overall
Team	W		L		T	W		L		T
Toledo $	7	–	1	–	1	8	–	3	–	1
Bowling Green	7	–	2	–	0	8	–	3	–	0
Central Michigan	6	–	2	–	1	8	–	2	–	1
Ohio	4	–	4	–	1	4	–	6	–	1
Northern Illinois	3	–	5	–	1	4	–	6	–	1
Miami (OH)	3	–	5	–	0	4	–	7	–	0
Ball State	3	–	5	–	0	3	–	8	–	0
Western Michigan	3	–	6	–	0	5	–	6	–	0
Kent State	3	–	6	–	0	4	–	7	–	0
Eastern Michigan	2	–	5	–	2	2	–	7	–	2
$ – Conference champion

The 1984 Ball State Cardinals football team was an American football team that represented Ball State University in the Mid-American Conference (MAC) during the 1984 NCAA Division I-A football season. In its seventh and final season under head coach Dwight Wallace, the team compiled a 3–8 record (3–5 against MAC opponents) and tied for sixth place out of ten teams in the conference. The team played its home games at Ball State Stadium in Muncie, Indiana.

The team's statistical leaders included Neil Britt with 1,205 passing yards, Burt Austin with 551 rushing yards, Ricky George with 503 receiving yards, and Jay Neal and John Diettrich with 36 points scored.

== Schedule ==
Date	Opponent	Site	Result	Attendance	Source
September 1	at UMass*	Alumni Stadium; Hadley, MA	L 10–26	8,946	
September 8	Toledo	Ball State Stadium; Muncie, IN	L 2–20		
September 15	Ohio	Ball State Stadium; Muncie, IN	L 17–31		
September 22	at Washington State*	Martin Stadium; Pullman, WA	L 14–16	16,000	
September 29	at Northern Illinois	Huskie Stadium; DeKalb, IL (rivalry)	W 15–14	26,445	
October 6	vs. No. 1 (I-AA) Indiana State*	Hoosier Dome; Indianapolis, IN (rivalry)	L 6–34	20,242	
October 13	Kent State	Ball State Stadium; Muncie, IN	L 10–15		
October 20	Western Michigan	Ball State Stadium; Muncie, IN	W 23–20		
October 27	at Eastern Michigan	Rynearson Stadium; Ypsilanti, MI	W 17–10		
November 3	Bowling Green	Ball State Stadium; Muncie, IN	L 13–38		
November 10	at Central Michigan	Kelly/Shorts Stadium; Mount Pleasant, MI	L 7–51	16,712	
*Non-conference game; Rankings from NCAA Division I-AA Football Committee Poll released prior to the game
