= 1984 Murray State Racers football team =

American college football season

1984 Murray State Racers football
- Conference: Ohio Valley Conference
- Record: 9–2 (5–2 OVC)
- Head coach: Frank Beamer (4th season)
- Defensive coordinator: Mike Mahoney (4th season)
- Home stadium: Roy Stewart Stadium

1984 Ohio Valley Conference football standings
	Conf.					Overall
Team	W		L		T	W		L		T
No. 8 Eastern Kentucky $^	6	–	1	–	0	8	–	4	–	0
No. 7 Middle Tennessee ^	5	–	2	–	0	11	–	3	–	0
No. 13 Murray State	5	–	2	–	0	9	–	2	–	0
Youngstown State	5	–	2	–	0	7	–	4	–	0
Austin Peay	4	–	3	–	0	7	–	4	–	0
Akron	2	–	5	–	0	4	–	7	–	0
Morehead State	1	–	6	–	0	2	–	9	–	0
Tennessee Tech	0	–	7	–	0	0	–	11	–	0
$ – Conference champion; ^ – NCAA Division I-AA playoff participant; Rankings from NCAA Division I-AA Football Committee poll

The 1984 Murray State Racers football team represented Murray State University during the 1984 NCAA Division I-AA football season as a member of the Ohio Valley Conference (OVC). Led by fourth-year head coach Frank Beamer, the Racers compiled an overall record of 9–2 with a mark of 4–2 in conference play, and finished tied for second in the OVC.

== Schedule ==
Date	Opponent	Rank	Site	Result	Attendance	Source
September 1	at Louisville*		Cardinal Stadium; Louisville, KY	W 26–23	24,557	
September 15	Southeast Missouri State*		Roy Stewart Stadium; Murray, KY	W 42–3	8,200	
September 22	at Tennessee Tech	No. 6	Tucker Stadium; Cookeville, TN	W 37–0	7,484	
September 29	at Morehead State	No. 6	Jayne Stadium; Morehead, KY	W 58–28	3,500	
October 6	Southwest Missouri State*	No. 4	Roy Stewart Stadium; Murray, KY	W 33–20		
October 13	No. 8 Middle Tennessee	No. 3	Roy Stewart Stadium; Murray, KY	L 16–19		
October 20	Akron	No. 9	Roy Stewart Stadium; Murray, KY	W 13–6		
October 27	at Eastern Kentucky	No. 10	Hanger Field; Richmond, KY	L 14–27		
November 3	Austin Peay	No. 17	Roy Stewart Stadium; Murray, KY	W 20–13 ^{OT}		
November 10	Youngstown State	No. 16	Roy Stewart Stadium; Murray, KY	W 35–7		
November 17	Western Kentucky*	No. 14	Roy Stewart Stadium; Murray, KY (rivalry)	W 17–16	7,500	
*Non-conference game; Rankings from NCAA Division I-AA Football Committee Poll released prior to the game
