= 1984 Southwest Missouri State Bears football team =

American college football season

1984 Southwest Missouri State Bears football
- Conference: Association of Mid-Continent Universities
- Record: 6–3–1 (1–1–1 Mid-Con)
- Head coach: Rich Johanningmeier (9th season)
- Captains: Mike Armentrout; Cornelius Blow; Johnny Longstreet
- Home stadium: Briggs Stadium

1984 Association of Mid-Continent Universities football standings
	Conf.					Overall
Team	W		L		T	W		L		T
No. 18 Northern Iowa +	2	–	1	–	0	9	–	2	–	0
Eastern Illinois +	2	–	1	–	0	6	–	5	–	0
Southwest Missouri State	1	–	1	–	1	6	–	3	–	1
Western Illinois	0	–	2	–	1	6	–	4	–	1
+ – Conference co-champions; Rankings from NCAA Division I-AA Football Committee poll

The 1984 Southwest Missouri State Bears football team represented Southwest Missouri State University (now known as Missouri State University) as a member of the Association of Mid-Continent Universities (Mid-Con) during the 1984 NCAA Division I-AA football season. Led by ninth-year head coach Rich Johanningmeier, the Bears compiled an overall record of 6–3–1, with a mark of 1–1–1 in conference play, and finished third in the Mid-Con.

== Schedule ==
Date	Opponent	Site	Result	Attendance	Source
September 1	at Drake*	Drake Stadium; Des Moines, IA	W 17–12		
September 8	Western Illinois	Briggs Stadium; Springfield, MO	T 13–13		
September 15	at Central Missouri State*	Kennedy Field; Warrensburg, MO	W 35–0		
September 22	at Northern Iowa	UNI-Dome; Cedar Falls, IA	L 10–24		
September 29	Northeast Missouri State*	Briggs Stadium; Springfield, MO	W 37–26		
October 6	at No. 4 Murray State*	Roy Stewart Stadium; Murray, KY	L 20–33		
October 13	at Western Kentucky*	L. T. Smith Stadium; Bowling Green, KY	W 25–10	6,500	
October 27	Eastern Illinois	Briggs Stadium; Springfield, MO	W 29–28	7,018	
November 3	Southeastern Louisiana*	Briggs Stadium; Springfield, MO	L 24–30	3,780	
November 10	Southern Illinois*	Briggs Stadium; Springfield, MO	W 31–6	807	
*Non-conference game; Rankings from NCAA Division I-AA Football Committee Poll released prior to the game
