= 1984 Drake Bulldogs football team =

American college football season

1984 Drake Bulldogs football
- Conference: Missouri Valley Conference
- Record: 4–7 (2–3 MVC)
- Head coach: Chuck Shelton (8th season)
- Defensive coordinator: Fred Bliel (1st season)
- Home stadium: Drake Stadium

1984 Missouri Valley Conference football standings
	Conf.					Overall
Team	W		L		T	W		L		T
Tulsa $	5	–	0	–	0	6	–	5	–	0
No. 5 Indiana State ^	4	–	1	–	0	9	–	3	–	0
Illinois State	3	–	2	–	0	5	–	6	–	0
West Texas State	2	–	3	–	0	3	–	8	–	0
Wichita State	2	–	3	–	0	2	–	9	–	0
Drake	2	–	3	–	0	4	–	7	–	0
Southern Illinois	0	–	5	–	0	3	–	8	–	0
$ – Conference champion; ^ – NCAA Division I-AA playoff participant; Indiana State's game against Louisville and West Texas State and Wichita State's games against New Mexico State counted in the conference standings. The conference was a hybrid of NCAA Division I-A and I-AA programs. Tulsa and Wichita State were I-A and the other teams were I-AA.; Rankings from NCAA Division I-AA Football Committee poll

The 1984 Drake Bulldogs football team represented the Drake University as a member of the Missouri Valley Conference (MVC) during the 1984 NCAA Division I-AA football season. Led by eighth-year head coach Chuck Shelton, Drake compiled an overall record of 4–7 with a mark of 2–3 in conference play, and finished tied for fourth in the MVC.

== Schedule ==
Date	Opponent	Site	Result	Attendance	Source
September 1	Southwest Missouri State*	Drake Stadium; Des Moines, IA	L 12–17		
September 8	Northern Iowa*	Drake Stadium; Des Moines, IA	L 28–33	7,400	
September 15	at Iowa State*	Cyclone Stadium; Ames, IA	L 17–21	47,656	
September 22	New Mexico State*	Drake Stadium; Des Moines, IA	W 35–28		
September 29	at Illinois State	Hancock Stadium; Normal, IL	L 0–28	12,136	
October 6	Northeast Missouri State*	Drake Stadium; Des Moines, IA	W 31–17	4,400	
October 13	at Western Illinois*	Hanson Field; Macomb, IL	L 20–37	11,631	
October 20	at No. 1 Indiana State	Memorial Stadium; Terre Haute, IN	L 3–17	10,170	
October 27	Wichita State	Drake Stadium; Des Moines, IA	L 6–23	7,480	
November 3	Southern Illinois	Drake Stadium; Des Moines, IA	W 20–17	5,200	
November 17	at West Texas State	Kimbrough Memorial Stadium; Canyon, TX	W 25–22		
*Non-conference game; Rankings from NCAA Division I-AA Football Committee Poll released prior to the game
