= 1984 Western Illinois Leathernecks football team =

American college football season

1984 Western Illinois Leathernecks football
- Conference: Association of Mid-Continent Universities
- Record: 6–4–1 (0–2–1 Mid-Con)
- Head coach: Bruce Craddock (2nd season)
- Home stadium: Hanson Field

1984 Association of Mid-Continent Universities football standings
	Conf.					Overall
Team	W		L		T	W		L		T
No. 18 Northern Iowa +	2	–	1	–	0	9	–	2	–	0
Eastern Illinois +	2	–	1	–	0	6	–	5	–	0
Southwest Missouri State	1	–	1	–	1	6	–	3	–	1
Western Illinois	0	–	2	–	1	6	–	4	–	1
+ – Conference co-champions; Rankings from NCAA Division I-AA Football Committee poll

The 1984 Western Illinois Leathernecks football team represented Western Illinois University as a member of the Association of Mid-Continent Universities (Mid-Con) during the 1984 NCAA Division I-AA football season. Led by second-year head coach Bruce Craddock, the Leathernecks compiled an overall record of 6–4–1, with a mark of 0–2–1 in conference play, and finished fourth in the Mid-Con.

== Schedule ==
Date	Opponent	Site	Result	Attendance	Source
September 1	Central Missouri State*	Hanson Field; Macomb, IL	W 37–22		
September 8	at Southwest Missouri State	Briggs Stadium; Springfield, MO	T 13–13		
September 15	at Southern Illinois*	McAndrew Stadium; Carbondale, IL	W 34–24	12,000	
September 22	Youngstown State*	Hanson Field; Macomb, IL	W 48–15		
September 29	at Northern Iowa	UNI-Dome; Cedar Falls, IA	L 17–30	11,200	
October 13	Drake*	Hanson Field; Macomb, IL	W 37–20	11,631	
October 20	Eastern Illinois	Hanson Field; Macomb, IL	L 0–14	4,894	
October 27	Illinois State*	Hanson Field; Macomb, IL	W 28–14	2,876	
November 3	at Northern Michigan*	Memorial Field; Marquette, MI	L 18–20		
November 10	at Northeast Missouri State*	Stokes Stadium; Kirksville, MO	L 14–19		
November 17	No. 3 Indiana State*	Hanson Field; Macomb, IL	W 22–2	7,732	
*Non-conference game; Rankings from NCAA Division I-AA Football Committee Poll released prior to the game
