= 1984 UNLV Rebels football team =

American college football season

1984 UNLV Rebels football

PCAA champion (forfeited)

California Bowl, F 30–13 (forfeit) vs. Toledo
- Conference: Pacific Coast Athletic Association
- Record: 0–13, 11 wins forfeited (0–7 PCAA, 7 wins forfeited)
- Head coach: Harvey Hyde (3rd season)
- Home stadium: Sam Boyd Silver Bowl

1984 Pacific Coast Athletic Association football standings
	Conf.					Overall
Team	W		L		T	W		L		T
Cal State Fullerton $	7	–	0	–	0	12	–	0	–	0
San Jose State	6	–	1	–	0	7	–	4	–	0
Fresno State	4	–	3	–	0	7	–	5	–	0
Long Beach State	4	–	3	–	0	5	–	6	–	0
Pacific (CA)	3	–	4	–	0	5	–	6	–	0
Utah State	2	–	5	–	0	2	–	9	–	0
New Mexico State	1	–	6	–	0	2	–	9	–	0
UNLV	0	–	7	–	0	0	–	13	–	0
$ – Conference champion; Records adjusted for UNLV's forfeit of all 11 victories

The 1984 UNLV Rebels football team was an American football team that represented the University of Nevada, Las Vegas (UNLV) as a member of the Pacific Coast Athletic Association (PCAA) during the 1984 NCAA Division I-A football season. In their third year under head coach Harvey Hyde, the Rebels compiled an overall record of 11–2 record with a mark of 7–0 in conference play, winning the PCAA title. UNLV earned a berth in the California Bowl, where Rebels lost to Toledo. The team played home games at the Sam Boyd Silver Bowl in Whitney, Nevada.

In March 1985, the NCAA forced UNLV to forfeit all of its victories from their 1983 and 1984 seasons due to playing with ineligible players.

== Schedule ==
Date	Opponent	Site	Result	Attendance	Source
September 8	San Jose State	Sam Boyd Silver Bowl; Whitney, NV	F 30–15 (forfeit)	21,360	
September 15	at New Mexico State	Aggie Memorial Stadium; Las Cruces, NM	F 28–21 (forfeit)	15,587	
September 22	Wichita State*	Sam Boyd Silver Bowl; Whitney, NV	F 38–21 (forfeit)	17,481	
September 29	at Hawaii*	Aloha Stadium; Halawa, HI	L 12–16	41,904	
October 6	at Long Beach State	Veterans Memorial Stadium; Long Beach, CA	F 41–23 (forfeit)	7,216	
October 13	Idaho State*	Sam Boyd Silver Bowl; Whitney, NV	F 33–20 (forfeit)	17,755	
October 20	at Pacific (CA)	Pacific Memorial Stadium; Stockton, CA	F 35–21 (forfeit)	17,500	
November 3	at San Diego State*	Jack Murphy Stadium; San Diego, CA	F 30–14 (forfeit)	16,883	
November 10	Cal State Fullerton	Sam Boyd Silver Bowl; Whitney, NV	F 26–20 (forfeit)	25,678	
November 17	at Utah State	Romney Stadium; Logan, UT	F 36–20 (forfeit)	6,279	
November 24	Fresno State	Sam Boyd Silver Bowl; Whitney, NV	F 27–13 (forfeit)	12,155	
December 1	No. 10 SMU*	Sam Boyd Silver Bowl; Whitney, NV	L 21–38	23,639	
December 15	vs. Toledo*	Bulldog Stadium; Fresno, CA (California Bowl)	F 30–13 (forfeit)	21,741	
*Non-conference game; Rankings from AP Poll released prior to the game

== Personnel ==
1984 UNLV Rebels football team roster
Players			Coaches
Offense: Pos. / # / Name / Class; QB / 12 / Randall Cunningham / Sr	Defense: Pos. / # / Name / Class	Special teams: Pos. / # / Name / Class	Head coach: Harvey Hyde; Coordinators/assistant coaches Legend: (C) Team captain; (S) Suspended; (I) Ineligible; Injured; Redshirt
