= 1984 Miami Redskins football team =

American college football season

1984 Miami Redskins football
- Conference: Mid-American Conference
- Record: 4–7 (3–5 MAC)
- Head coach: Tim Rose (2nd season)
- Defensive coordinator: Dean Pees (2nd season)
- Home stadium: Yager Stadium

1984 Mid-American Conference football standings
| | Conf. | | | | | Overall |
| Team | W | | L | | T | W | | L | | T |
|---|---|---|---|---|---|---|---|---|---|---|
| Toledo $ | 7 | – | 1 | – | 1 | 8 | – | 3 | – | 1 |
| Bowling Green | 7 | – | 2 | – | 0 | 8 | – | 3 | – | 0 |
| Central Michigan | 6 | – | 2 | – | 1 | 8 | – | 2 | – | 1 |
| Ohio | 4 | – | 4 | – | 1 | 4 | – | 6 | – | 1 |
| Northern Illinois | 3 | – | 5 | – | 1 | 4 | – | 6 | – | 1 |
| Miami (OH) | 3 | – | 5 | – | 0 | 4 | – | 7 | – | 0 |
| Ball State | 3 | – | 5 | – | 0 | 3 | – | 8 | – | 0 |
| Western Michigan | 3 | – | 6 | – | 0 | 5 | – | 6 | – | 0 |
| Kent State | 3 | – | 6 | – | 0 | 4 | – | 7 | – | 0 |
| Eastern Michigan | 2 | – | 5 | – | 2 | 2 | – | 7 | – | 2 |
$ – Conference champion

The 1984 Miami Redskins football team was an American football team that represented Miami University in the Mid-American Conference (MAC) during the 1984 NCAA Division I-A football season. In its second season under head coach Tim Rose, the team compiled a 4–7 record (3–5 against MAC opponents), finished in a tie for sixth place in the MAC, and were outscored by all opponents by a combined total of 221 to 175.

The team's statistical leaders included Todd Rollins with 951 passing yards, George Swarn with 1,282 rushing yards, and Tom Murphy with 492 receiving yards.

== Schedule ==
| Date | Opponent | Site | Result | Attendance | Source |
|---|---|---|---|---|---|
| September 8 | at Western Michigan | Waldo Stadium; Kalamazoo, MI | L 13–17 | 12,873 | |
| September 15 | at Houston* | Houston Astrodome; Houston, TX | L 17–30 | 28,750 | |
| September 22 | Bowling Green | Yager Stadium; Oxford, OH | L 10–41 | | |
| September 29 | at No. 6 Washington* | Husky Stadium; Seattle, WA | L 7–53 | 56,900 | |
| October 6 | at Kent State | Dix Stadium; Kent, OH | W 19–3 | | |
| October 13 | Toledo | Yager Stadium; Oxford, OH | L 7–10 | 21,395 | |
| October 20 | Central Michigan | Yager Stadium; Oxford, OH | L 9–10 | | |
| October 27 | at Northern Illinois | Huskie Stadium; DeKalb, IL | W 20–7 | 10,200 | |
| November 3 | at Ohio | Peden Stadium; Athens, OH (rivalry) | L 19–24 | | |
| November 10 | Eastern Michigan | Yager Stadium; Oxford, OH | W 23–0 | 23,268 | |
| November 22 | at Cincinnati* | Riverfront Stadium; Cincinnati, OH (rivalry) | W 31–26 | 15,211 | |
*Non-conference game; Rankings from AP Poll released prior to the game

== Roster ==
1984 Miami Redskins football team roster
Players
Coaches
Offense

| Pos. | # | Name | Class |
|---|---|---|---|
| QB | 1 | Al Marlow | Jr |
| WR | 83 | Tom Murphy | Jr |
| WR | 19 | Andy Schillinger | Fr |
| C | 68 | Randy Sullivan | Sr |
| RB | 44 | George Swarn | So |

Defense

| Pos. | # | Name | Class |
|---|---|---|---|
| LB | 51 | Jeff Happ | Fr |
| DB | 16 | Sheldon White | Fr |

Special teams

| Pos. | # | Name | Class |
|---|---|---|---|
| P | 92 | Doug Kolesar | Fr |

Head coach

- Tim Rose

Coordinators/assistant coaches

Legend

- (C) Team captain
- (S) Suspended
- (I) Ineligible
- Injured
- Redshirt
