= 1984 Akron Zips football team =

American college football season

1984 Akron Zips football
- Conference: Ohio Valley Conference
- Record: 4–7 (2–5 OVC)
- Head coach: Jim Dennison (12th season)
- Captain: Doug Dillon; Ed Grimsley; Russell Holmes; Clarence Kelly
- Home stadium: Rubber Bowl

1984 Ohio Valley Conference football standings
	Conf.					Overall
Team	W		L		T	W		L		T
No. 8 Eastern Kentucky $^	6	–	1	–	0	8	–	4	–	0
No. 7 Middle Tennessee ^	5	–	2	–	0	11	–	3	–	0
No. 13 Murray State	5	–	2	–	0	9	–	2	–	0
Youngstown State	5	–	2	–	0	7	–	4	–	0
Austin Peay	4	–	3	–	0	7	–	4	–	0
Akron	2	–	5	–	0	4	–	7	–	0
Morehead State	1	–	6	–	0	2	–	9	–	0
Tennessee Tech	0	–	7	–	0	0	–	11	–	0
$ – Conference champion; ^ – NCAA Division I-AA playoff participant; Rankings from NCAA Division I-AA Football Committee poll

The 1984 Akron Zips football team represented Akron University in the 1984 NCAA Division I-AA football season as a member of the Ohio Valley Conference. Led by 12th-year head coach Jim Dennison, the Zips played their home games at the Rubber Bowl in Akron, Ohio. They finished the season with a record of 4–7 overall and 2–5 in OVC play, placing sixth.

== Schedule ==
Date	Opponent	Site	Result	Attendance	Source
September 1	at Kent State*	Dix Stadium; Kent, OH (Wagon Wheel)	L 17–24		
September 8	at Cincinnati*	Nippert Stadium; Cincinnati, OH	L 27–28		
September 15	Western Kentucky*	Rubber Bowl; Akron, OH	W 42–7	23,984	
September 22	Eastern Kentucky	Rubber Bowl; Akron, OH	L 21–22	15,131	
September 29	at Middle Tennessee	Johnny "Red" Floyd Stadium; Murfreesboro, TN	L 3–16		
October 6	at UCF*	Florida Citrus Bowl; Orlando, FL	W 26–21	6,814	
October 14	Morehead State	Rubber Bowl; Akron, OH	W 27–3	10,864	
October 20	at No. 9 Murray State	Roy Stewart Stadium; Murray, KY	L 6–13		
October 27	Tennessee Tech	Rubber Bowl; Akron, OH	W 17–9	5,232	
November 3	at Youngstown State	Stambaugh Stadium; Youngstown, OH (Steel Tire)	L 2–3	9,201	
November 17	Austin Peay	Rubber Bowl; Akron, OH	L 17–21		
*Non-conference game; Rankings from NCAA Division I-AA Football Committee Poll released prior to the game
