= 1984 Kent State Golden Flashes football team =

American college football season

1984 Kent State Golden Flashes football
- Conference: Mid-American Conference
- Record: 4–7 (3–6 MAC)
- Head coach: Dick Scesniak (2nd season)
- Offensive coordinator: John O'Grady (2nd season)
- Home stadium: Dix Stadium

1984 Mid-American Conference football standings
	Conf.					Overall
Team	W		L		T	W		L		T
Toledo $	7	–	1	–	1	8	–	3	–	1
Bowling Green	7	–	2	–	0	8	–	3	–	0
Central Michigan	6	–	2	–	1	8	–	2	–	1
Ohio	4	–	4	–	1	4	–	6	–	1
Northern Illinois	3	–	5	–	1	4	–	6	–	1
Miami (OH)	3	–	5	–	0	4	–	7	–	0
Ball State	3	–	5	–	0	3	–	8	–	0
Western Michigan	3	–	6	–	0	5	–	6	–	0
Kent State	3	–	6	–	0	4	–	7	–	0
Eastern Michigan	2	–	5	–	2	2	–	7	–	2
$ – Conference champion

The 1984 Kent State Golden Flashes football team was an American football team that represented Kent State University in the Mid-American Conference (MAC) during the 1984 NCAA Division I-A football season. In their second season under head coach Dick Scesniak, the Golden Flashes compiled a 4–7 record (3–6 against MAC opponents), finished in a tie for eighth place in the MAC, and were outscored by all opponents by a combined total of 199 to 135.

The team's statistical leaders included Derrick Nix with 720 rushing yards, Stu Rayburn with 1,381 passing yards, and Ken Hughes with 621 receiving yards. Defensive back Derrick Samuels was selected as a first-team All-MAC player.

== Schedule ==
Date	Opponent	Site	Result	Attendance	Source
September 1	Akron*	Dix Stadium; Kent, OH (Wagon Wheel)	W 24–17		
September 8	at Kentucky*	Commonwealth Stadium; Lexington, KY	L 0–42	56,402	
September 22	at Northern Illinois	Huskie Stadium; DeKalb, IL	L 10–24	23,712	
September 29	Central Michigan	Dix Stadium; Kent, OH	L 10–14		
October 6	Miami (OH)	Dix Stadium; Kent, OH	L 3–19		
October 13	at Ball State	Ball State Stadium; Muncie, IN	W 15–10		
October 20	at Ohio	Peden Stadium; Athens, OH	W 19–7	18,437	
October 27	Toledo	Dix Stadium; Kent, OH	W 17–6		
November 3	at Eastern Michigan	Rynearson Stadium; Ypsilanti, MI	L 18–20		
November 10	at Western Michigan	Waldo Stadium; Kalamazoo, MI	L 9–13		
November 17	Bowling Green	Dix Stadium; Kent, OH (rivalry)	L 10–27		
*Non-conference game
