= 1984 West Texas State Buffaloes football team =

American college football season

1984 West Texas State Buffaloes football
- Conference: Missouri Valley Conference
- Record: 3–8 (2–3 MVC)
- Head coach: Don Davis (3rd season)
- Offensive coordinator: Jack Welch (3rd season)
- Home stadium: Kimbrough Memorial Stadium

1984 Missouri Valley Conference football standings
	Conf.					Overall
Team	W		L		T	W		L		T
Tulsa $	5	–	0	–	0	6	–	5	–	0
No. 5 Indiana State ^	4	–	1	–	0	9	–	3	–	0
Illinois State	3	–	2	–	0	5	–	6	–	0
West Texas State	2	–	3	–	0	3	–	8	–	0
Wichita State	2	–	3	–	0	2	–	9	–	0
Drake	2	–	3	–	0	4	–	7	–	0
Southern Illinois	0	–	5	–	0	3	–	8	–	0
$ – Conference champion; ^ – NCAA Division I-AA playoff participant; Indiana State's game against Louisville and West Texas State and Wichita State's games against New Mexico State counted in the conference standings. The conference was a hybrid of NCAA Division I-A and I-AA programs. Tulsa and Wichita State were I-A and the other teams were I-AA.; Rankings from NCAA Division I-AA Football Committee poll

The 1984 West Texas State Buffaloes football team was an American football team that represented West Texas State University—now known as West Texas A&M University—as a member of the Missouri Valley Conference (MVC) during the 1984 NCAA Division I-AA football season. In their third and final year under head coach Don Davis, the Buffaloes compiled an overall record of 3–8 with a mark of 2–3 in conference play, placing in a three-way tie for fourth in the MVC.

== Schedule ==
Date	Opponent	Site	Result	Attendance	Source
September 1	at Northern Illinois*	Huskie Stadium; DeKalb, IL	L 33–40		
September 8	at UT Arlington*	Maverick Stadium; Arlington, TX	L 19–27	9,367	
September 15	at New Mexico*	University Stadium; Albuquerque, NM	L 0–27	18,992	
September 22	No. 2 McNeese State*	Kimbrough Memorial Stadium; Canyon, TX	L 7–24		
September 29	at Iowa State*	Cyclone Stadium; Ames, IA	L 0–14	50,316	
October 6	Tulsa	Kimbrough Memorial Stadium; Canyon, TX	L 7–35	2,300	
October 13	Abilene Christian*^{†}	Kimbrough Memorial Stadium; Canyon, TX	W 14–10		
October 20	at Southern Illinois	McAndrew Stadium; Carbondale, IL	W 24–17	2,600	
October 26	at New Mexico State (Note: Designated conference game)	Aggie Memorial Stadium; Las Cruces, NM	W 21–13		
November 10	at Wichita State	Cessna Stadium; Wichita, KS	L 14–17	8,106	
November 17	Drake	Kimbrough Memorial Stadium; Canyon, TX	L 22–25		
*Non-conference game; ^{†}Homecoming; Rankings from NCAA Division I-AA Football Committee Poll released prior to the game
