= 1984 Youngstown State Penguins football team =

American college football season

1984 Youngstown State Penguins football
- Conference: Ohio Valley Conference
- Record: 7–4 (5–2 OVC)
- Head coach: Bill Narduzzi (10th season)
- Captain: Mark Derthick
- Home stadium: Stambaugh Stadium

1984 Ohio Valley Conference football standings
	Conf.					Overall
Team	W		L		T	W		L		T
No. 8 Eastern Kentucky $^	6	–	1	–	0	8	–	4	–	0
No. 7 Middle Tennessee ^	5	–	2	–	0	11	–	3	–	0
No. 13 Murray State	5	–	2	–	0	9	–	2	–	0
Youngstown State	5	–	2	–	0	7	–	4	–	0
Austin Peay	4	–	3	–	0	7	–	4	–	0
Akron	2	–	5	–	0	4	–	7	–	0
Morehead State	1	–	6	–	0	2	–	9	–	0
Tennessee Tech	0	–	7	–	0	0	–	11	–	0
$ – Conference champion; ^ – NCAA Division I-AA playoff participant; Rankings from NCAA Division I-AA Football Committee poll

The 1984 Youngstown State Penguins football team represented Youngstown State University during the 1984 NCAA Division I-AA football season as a member of the Ohio Valley Conference (OVC). Led by 10th-year head coach Bill Narduzzi, the Penguins compiled an overall record of 7–4 with a mark of 5–2 on conference play, and finished tied for second in the OVC.

== Schedule ==
Date	Opponent	Site	Result	Attendance	Source
September 1	Eastern Michigan*	Stambaugh Stadium; Youngstown, OH	W 31–7		
September 8	at Eastern Kentucky	Hanger Field; Richmond, KY	L 17–22	14,400	
September 15	at Cincinnati*	Nippert Stadium; Cincinnati, OH	W 27–23		
September 22	at Western Illinois*	Hanson Field; Macomb, IL	L 15–48		
October 6	Tennessee Tech	Stambaugh Stadium; Youngstown, OH	W 51–0		
October 13	at Austin Peay	Municipal Stadium; Clarksville, TN	W 16–13 ^{OT}	5,850	
October 20	Northern Iowa*	Stambaugh Stadium; Youngstown, OH	L 6–16		
October 27	No. 7 Middle Tennessee	Stambaugh Stadium; Youngstown, OH	W 23–13	6,052	
November 3	Akron	Stambaugh Stadium; Youngstown, OH (rivalry)	W 3–2	9,201	
November 10	at No. 16 Murray State	Roy Stewart Stadium; Murray, KY	L 7–35		
November 17	at Morehead State	Jayne Stadium; Morehead, KY	W 35–31	2,500	
*Non-conference game; Rankings from NCAA Division I-AA Football Committee Poll released prior to the game
