= 1984 Pacific Tigers football team =

American college football season

1984 Pacific Tigers football
- Conference: Pacific Coast Athletic Association
- Record: 5–6 (3–4 PCAA)
- Head coach: Bob Cope (2nd season)
- Home stadium: Pacific Memorial Stadium

1984 Pacific Coast Athletic Association football standings
	Conf.					Overall
Team	W		L		T	W		L		T
Cal State Fullerton $	7	–	0	–	0	12	–	0	–	0
San Jose State	6	–	1	–	0	7	–	4	–	0
Fresno State	4	–	3	–	0	7	–	5	–	0
Long Beach State	4	–	3	–	0	5	–	6	–	0
Pacific (CA)	3	–	4	–	0	5	–	6	–	0
Utah State	2	–	5	–	0	2	–	9	–	0
New Mexico State	1	–	6	–	0	2	–	9	–	0
UNLV	0	–	7	–	0	0	–	13	–	0
$ – Conference champion; Records adjusted for UNLV's forfeit of all 11 victories

The 1984 Pacific Tigers football team represented the University of the Pacific (UOP) in the 1984 NCAA Division I-A football season as a member of the Pacific Coast Athletic Association. (Note: The Big West Conference was known as the Pacific Coast Athletic Association from its founding in 1969 through 1987.)

The team was led by head coach Bob Cope, in his second year, and played their home games at Pacific Memorial Stadium (Note: Amos Alonzo Stagg Memorial Stadium was known as Pacific Memorial Stadium from its opening in 1950 through 1987.) in Stockton, California. On the field, they finished the season with a record of four wins and seven losses (4–7, 2–5 PCAA). The Tigers were outscored by their opponents 209–280 over the season.

After the season was over, it was discovered that the UNLV Rebels had used multiple ineligible players during both the 1983 and 1984 seasons. As a result, Pacific's loss to UNLV turns into a forfeit win and their record is adjusted to 5–6, 3–4 PCAA.

== Schedule ==
Date	Opponent	Site	Result	Attendance	Source
September 8	Nevada*	Pacific Memorial Stadium; Stockton, CA	W 12–7	23,857	
September 15	at California*	California Memorial Stadium; Berkeley, CA	L 12–28	37,000	
September 22	at Northern Arizona*	Walkup Skydome; Flagstaff, AZ	W 38–28		
September 29	at Oregon*	Autzen Stadium; Eugene, OR	L 14–30	28,505	
October 6	Cal State Fullerton	Pacific Memorial Stadium; Stockton, CA	L 31–41	19,567	
October 13	New Mexico State^{†}	Pacific Memorial Stadium; Stockton, CA	W 21–7	16,987	
October 20	UNLV	Pacific Memorial Stadium; Stockton, CA	W 21–35 (forfeit win)	17,500	
October 27	at Utah State	Romney Stadium; Logan, UT	L 14–41	8,597	
November 3	at Long Beach State	Veterans Memorial Stadium; Long Beach, CA	L 22–24	5,841	
November 10	at Fresno State	Bulldog Stadium; Fresno, CA	W 24–6	24,684	
November 17	San Jose State	Pacific Memorial Stadium; Stockton, CA (Victory Bell)	L 0–33	1,000	
*Non-conference game; ^{†}Homecoming

== Team players in the NFL ==
The following UOP players were selected in the 1985 NFL draft.

Player	Position	Round	Overall	NFL team
Paul Berner	Quarterback	9	234	San Diego Chargers
