= Kevin Bowman =

American football player (born 1962)

No. 83
- Position: Wide receiver

Personal information
- Born: February 23, 1962 (age 64); Sacramento, California, U.S.
- Listed height: 6 ft 3 in (1.91 m)
- Listed weight: 205 lb (93 kg)

Career information
- High school: Luther Burbank (Sacramento, California)
- College: Sacramento City (1980–1981); Colorado (1982); San Jose State (1983–1984)
- NFL draft: 1985: undrafted

Career history
- Dallas Cowboys (1985)*; San Francisco 49ers (1986)*; BC Lions (1987); Philadelphia Eagles (1987); Tampa Bay Buccaneers (1988)*; Philadelphia Eagles (1989)*
- * Offseason or practice squad member only
- Stats at Pro Football Reference

Kevin Bowman (born February 23, 1962) is an American former professional football wide receiver. He played college football for the Sacramento City Panthers and San Jose State Spartans. After college, Bowman split the 1987 season with the BC Lions of the Canadian Football League (CFL) and the Philadelphia Eagles of the National Football League (NFL). He was also a member of the Dallas Cowboys, San Francisco 49ers, and Tampa Bay Buccaneers.

== Early life ==
Bowman was born on February 23, 1962, in Sacramento, California. He attended Luther Burbank High School in Sacramento where he competed in football, basketball and track and field. As a senior football player in 1979, Bowman was named first-team All-Metro League as an end and second-team All-Metro League as a linebacker. He ranked among the area scoring leaders that year. He was also selected to the Optimist all-star basketball game after his senior year. After high school, Bowman decided to begin his college football career for the Panthers of Sacramento City College. He had initially planned to try walking-on for the Grambling State Tigers in Louisiana but could not afford the costs.

== College career ==
Bowman played for Sacramento City College from 1980 to 1981 and lettered both years. In 1981, he helped the Panthers to a perfect 12–0 record and a junior college championship, posting seven catches for 122 yards and three touchdowns in the title game victory. He was a 1981 all-state selection. In two years at Sacramento, Bowman totaled over 1,600 receiving yards and 20 touchdowns. Bowman transferred to the Colorado Buffaloes in 1982 and was projected to be a starter that year. However, in June 1982, he was arrested for allegedly trying to sell marijuana and removed from the team.

Bowman redshirted for the 1982 season and transferred to the San Jose State Spartans. He suffered a hamstring injury in 1983 and was kept on the bench for almost the entire season. He caught no passes and saw limited special teams action. Bowman told The Sacramento Bee that the season was "very disappointing" and said, "Coach [Jack] Elway said my practice tempo wasn't what he expected. But the assistant coaches would tell me I was going to play. Then I'd sit on the bench." Elway left for Stanford in 1984 and Bowman had a breakout year for the Spartans. In a game against Utah State, he caught a school-record 12 passes for 146 yards and a touchdown, earning Pacific Coast Athletic Association (PCAA) Offensive Player of the Week honors. He finished the season with 54 catches for 652 yards and four touchdowns, while the Spartans compiled a record of 6–5. Bowman also recorded 12 kickoff returns for 220 yards. He placed fourth in the PCAA in receptions, sixth in receiving yards and sixth in receiving touchdowns.

== Professional career ==
Bowman was selected by the Oakland Invaders in the 1985 USFL territorial draft, but did not sign with them. After going unselected in the 1985 NFL draft, he signed with the Dallas Cowboys as an undrafted free agent. He was released by the Cowboys on July 26, 1985. On March 2, 1986, he signed with the San Francisco 49ers, reuniting with former high school and Sacramento City College teammate Sean Thomas. However, Bowman was released prior to the season, on August 13, 1986. He signed with the BC Lions of the Canadian Football League (CFL) on April 7, 1987, and briefly became a starter for the team after injuries to other receivers. He caught four passes for 43 yards in two games before being released on August 11.

After the NFL Players Association went on strike, Bowman was signed by the Philadelphia Eagles on September 24, 1987, as a replacement player. He started all three games during the strike for the Eagles as a receiver. In his debut, a 35–3 loss to the Chicago Bears, he caught one pass for four yards, returned three kickoffs for 45 yards, and returned three punts for 43 yards. The following game, he had his best performance in a 41–22 loss to the Dallas Cowboys, catching five passes for 123 yards including a 62-yard touchdown, returning four kickoffs for 108 yards, and returning one punt for zero yards, for a total of 231 all-purpose yards. Bowman recorded no statistics in the team's final game of the strike, a 16–10 loss to the Green Bay Packers, and was then released. He concluded his three-game stint with the Eagles having caught six passes for 127 yards and a touchdown, averaging 21.2 yards per catch. Bowman also had seven kick returns for 153 yards and four punt returns for 43 yards, while fumbling once.

Bowman signed with the Tampa Bay Buccaneers on December 30, 1987, but was released on June 14, 1988. On March 10, 1989, it was reported that he had returned to the Eagles on a one-year contract. However, he was later released at the start of May 1989. Bowman concluded his professional career having caught six passes for 127 yards and a touchdown in three NFL games and four passes for 43 yards in two CFL games.
