= Tom Neville (guard) =

American football player (1961–1998)

No. 72, 69, 61
- Position: Guard

Personal information
- Born: September 4, 1961; Salcha, Alaska, U.S.
- Died: May 9, 1998 (aged 36); Fresno, California, U.S.
- Listed height: 6 ft 5 in (1.96 m)
- Listed weight: 280 lb (127 kg)

Career information
- College: Weber State; Fresno State
- NFL draft: 1985: undrafted

Career history
- Seattle Seahawks (1985)*; Green Bay Packers (1986–1988); Detroit Lions (1989); Kansas City Chiefs (1990)*; San Francisco 49ers (1991); Green Bay Packers (1992); Kansas City Chiefs (1994)*
- * Offseason or practice squad member only

Career NFL statistics
- Games played: 50
- Games started: 15
- Fumble recoveries: 1
- Stats at Pro Football Reference

Thomas Lee Neville was a guard in the National Football League. He first played with the Green Bay Packers for three seasons. After a season away from the NFL, he played with the San Francisco 49ers during the 1991 NFL season. Following another season away from the NFL, he re-joined the Packers for the 1993 NFL season. He was also a member of the team during the next seasons, but did not see any playing time during the regular season.

In 1998, Neville's life turned for the worse, and he began to engage in behavior his family members described as "bizarre". He was picked up by Fresno police, who described his behavior as paranoid. He was taken by ambulance to a hospital and later was transferred to a private psychiatric center. Two days later, he broke out of the center. Police found him hiding in an apartment complex across the street. Police negotiated with him, but he refused to surrender. Police said Neville was fatally shot when Neville tossed aside officers and tried to grab an officer's gun. Some speculated Neville's violent reaction came as an adverse reaction to medication he was prescribed. Neville's death was one of the factors that motivated his former Green Bay Packers teammate Ken Ruettgers to help establish GamesOver.org, a foundation which seeks to help professional athletes adjust to retirement.

The last week of Neville's life came as a shock to many who had known him through the years, one of whom described him as "a big, gentle bear". His funeral service was held at Sacred Heart Cathedral in Fairbanks, Alaska, where he worked managing real estate and coaching high school football teams.
