= 1984 New Mexico State Aggies football team =

American college football season

1984 New Mexico State Aggies football
- Conference: Pacific Coast Athletic Association
- Record: 3–8 (2–5 PCAA)
- Head coach: Fred Zechman (2nd season)
- Home stadium: Aggie Memorial Stadium

1984 Pacific Coast Athletic Association football standings
	Conf.					Overall
Team	W		L		T	W		L		T
Cal State Fullerton $	7	–	0	–	0	12	–	0	–	0
San Jose State	6	–	1	–	0	7	–	4	–	0
Fresno State	4	–	3	–	0	7	–	5	–	0
Long Beach State	4	–	3	–	0	5	–	6	–	0
Pacific (CA)	3	–	4	–	0	5	–	6	–	0
Utah State	2	–	5	–	0	2	–	9	–	0
New Mexico State	1	–	6	–	0	2	–	9	–	0
UNLV	0	–	7	–	0	0	–	13	–	0
$ – Conference champion; Records adjusted for UNLV's forfeit of all 11 victories

The 1984 New Mexico State Aggies football team was an American football team that represented New Mexico State University in the Pacific Coast Athletic Association during the 1984 NCAA Division I-A football season. In their second year under head coach Fred Zechman, the Aggies compiled a 3–8 record. The team played its home games at Aggie Memorial Stadium in Las Cruces, New Mexico.

== Schedule ==
Date	Opponent	Site	Result	Attendance	Source
September 1	at San Jose State	Spartan Stadium; San Jose, CA	L 0–14	12,687	
September 8	at New Mexico*	University Stadium; Albuquerque, NM (Rio Grande Rivalry)	L 21–61	25,442	
September 15	UNLV	Aggie Memorial Stadium; Las Cruces, NM	W 21–28 (forfeit win)	15,587	
September 22	at Drake*	Drake Stadium; Des Moines, IA	L 28–35		
September 29	at Fresno State	Bulldog Stadium; Fresno, CA	L 24–53	32,952	
October 6	UTEP (Note: Designated conference game)	Aggie Memorial Stadium; Las Cruces, NM (rivalry)	W 27–16	32,904	
October 13	at Pacific (CA)	Pacific Memorial Stadium; Stockton, CA	L 7–21	16,987	
October 20	Long Beach State	Aggie Memorial Stadium; Las Cruces, NM	L 13–43	12,155	
October 26	West Texas State*	Aggie Memorial Stadium; Las Cruces, NM	L 13–21		
November 3	at Wichita State*	Cessna Stadium; Wichita, KS	W 31–24	13,303	
November 17	Cal State Fullerton	Aggie Memorial Stadium; Las Cruces, NM	L 0–20	8,634	
*Non-conference game
