= 1984 Boston College Eagles football team =

American college football season

1984 Boston College Eagles football

Cotton Bowl Classic champion Eastern champion

Cotton Bowl Classic, W 45–28 vs. Houston
- Conference: Independent

Ranking
- Coaches: No. 4
- AP: No. 5
- Record: 10–2
- Head coach: Jack Bicknell (4th season)
- Defensive coordinator: Seymour "Red" Kelin (4th season)
- Captains: Mark MacDonald; David Thomas; Scott Harrington
- Home stadium: Alumni Stadium; Sullivan Stadium

1984 Major eastern college football independents records
	Conf.					Overall
Team	W		L		T	W		L		T
West Virginia	4	–	2	–	0	8	–	4	–	0
Penn State	3	–	2	–	0	6	–	5	–	0
No. 5 Boston College $	3	–	2	–	0	10	–	2	–	0
Rutgers	3	–	2	–	0	7	–	3	–	0
Temple	2	–	2	–	0	6	–	5	–	0
Pittsburgh	1	–	3	–	0	3	–	7	–	1
Syracuse	1	–	4	–	0	6	–	5	–	0
$ – Lambert Trophy Winner; Rankings from AP Poll

1984 NCAA Division I-A independents football records
	Conf.					Overall
Team	W		L		T	W		L		T
No. 5 Boston College		–		–		10	–	2	–	0
No. 11 South Carolina		–		–		10	–	2	–	0
Army		–		–		8	–	3	–	1
Rutgers		–		–		7	–	3	–	0
No. 17 Florida State		–		–		7	–	3	–	2
Virginia Tech		–		–		8	–	4	–	0
West Virginia		–		–		8	–	4	–	0
No. 18 Miami (FL)		–		–		8	–	5	–	0
Notre Dame		–		–		7	–	5	–	0
Temple		–		–		6	–	5	–	0
Southwestern Louisiana		–		–		6	–	5	–	0
Penn State		–		–		6	–	5	–	0
Syracuse		–		–		6	–	5	–	0
Memphis State		–		–		5	–	5	–	1
Navy		–		–		4	–	6	–	1
Southern Miss		–		–		4	–	7	–	0
Pittsburgh		–		–		3	–	7	–	1
Tulane		–		–		3	–	8	–	0
Cincinnati		–		–		2	–	9	–	0
East Carolina		–		–		2	–	9	–	0
Louisville		–		–		2	–	9	–	0
Rankings from AP Poll

The 1984 Boston College Eagles football team represented Boston College as an independent during the 1984 NCAA Division I-A football season.

Doug Flutie gained national attention in 1984 when he quarterbacked the Eagles to victory in a high-scoring, back-and-forth game against the Miami Hurricanes (led by QB Bernie Kosar). The game was nationally televised on CBS the day after Thanksgiving and thus had a huge audience. Miami staged a dramatic drive to take the lead, 45–41, in the closing minute of the game. Boston College then took possession at its own 22-yard line with 28 seconds to go. After two passes moved the ball another 30 yards, only 6 seconds remained. On the last play of the game, Flutie scrambled away from the defense and threw a Hail Mary pass that was caught in the end zone by senior wide receiver Gerard Phelan, giving BC a 47–45 win. Although many people think that play clinched the Heisman Trophy for Flutie, the voting was already complete before that game.

Boston College finished the season with a 10–2 record and a No. 5 ranking in the final AP Poll. The Eagles defeated the Southwest Conference champion Houston Cougars 45–28 in the 1985 Cotton Bowl. The team also captured the Lambert-Meadowlands Trophy (emblematic of the 'Eastern championship' in Division I FBS).

Flutie left school as the NCAA's all-time passing yardage leader with 10,579 yards and was a consensus All-American as a senior. He earned Player of the Year awards from UPI, Kodak, The Sporting News, and the Maxwell Football Club.

== Schedule ==
Date	Opponent	Rank	Site	TV	Result	Attendance	Source
September 1	Western Carolina	No. 19	Alumni Stadium; Chestnut Hill, MA		W 44–24	32,000	
September 8	at No. 9 Alabama	No. 18	Legion Field; Birmingham, AL	ABC	W 38–31	67,821	
September 22	North Carolina	No. 10	Sullivan Stadium; Foxborough, MA	ESPN	W 52–20	44,672	
October 13	Temple	No. 4	Alumni Stadium; Chestnut Hill, MA		W 24–10	32,000	
October 20	at No. 20 West Virginia	No. 4	Mountaineer Field; Morgantown, WV	ABC	L 20–21	60,286	
October 27	Rutgers	No. 11	Alumni Stadium; Chestnut Hill, MA	KATZ	W 35–23	32,000	
November 3	at Penn State	No. 9	Beaver Stadium; University Park, PA	ABC	L 30–37	85,690	
November 10	Army	No. 16	Alumni Stadium; Chestnut Hill, MA	KATZ	W 45–31	32,000	
November 17	Syracuse	No. 13	Sullivan Stadium; Foxborough, MA	KATZ	W 24–16	60,890	
November 23	at No. 12 Miami (FL)	No. 10	Miami Orange Bowl; Miami, FL	CBS	W 47–45	30,325	
December 1	at Holy Cross	No. 8	Fitton Field; Worcester, MA (rivalry)		W 45–10	25,000	
January 1, 1985	vs. Houston	No. 8	Cotton Bowl; Dallas, TX (Cotton Bowl Classic)	CBS	W 45–28	67,381	
Rankings from AP Poll released prior to the game

== Personnel ==
1984 Boston College Eagles football team roster
Players
Coaches
Offense

Pos.	#	Name	Class
OL	63	Mark Bardwell	Sr
RB	24	Ken Bell	Jr
C	66	Jack Bicknell Jr.	Sr
RB	32	Jim Browne	Sr
TE	85	Pete Casparriello	So
WR	44	Shawn Dombrowski	So
WR	26	Darren Flutie	Fr
QB	22	Doug Flutie	Sr
TE		Scott Gieselman
QB	7	Shawn Halloran	So
OL	79	Mark MacDonald	Sr
WR	82	Kelvin Martin	So
WR	20	Gerard Phelan	Sr
OL	54	Shawn Regent	Sr
RB		Steve Strachan	Sr
RB	23	Troy Stradford	So
RB		Tyrone Taylor
OL		Steve Trapilo
WR	3	Chris Tripucka	Sr
OL		Darren Twombly	So
RB		Steve Williams

Defense

Pos.	#	Name	Class
DE	97	John Bosa	So
LB	57	Ted Gaffney	Jr
DL	95	Chuck Gorecki	Jr
DT	52	Scott Harrington	Sr
LB	81	Andy Hemmer	Jr
LB		Pete Holey
DB		Neil Iton
DL		Rick Nickeson
DB		Dave Pereira
S	49	Carl Pellegata	Jr
LB	53	Bill Romanowski	Fr
DB		Todd Russell
DL	68	Mike Ruth	Jr
DL	50	David Thomas	Sr
DB	17	Tony Thurman	Sr
LB		Ed VonNessen

Special teams

Pos.	#	Name	Class
P		Steve Peach
K	2	Kevin Snow	Sr

Head coach

- Jack Bicknell

Coordinators/assistant coaches

Legend

- (C) Team captain
- (S) Suspended
- (I) Ineligible
- Injured
- Redshirt

== Rankings ==
Ranking movements Legend: ██ Increase in ranking ██ Decrease in ranking
	Week															
Poll	Pre	1	2	3	4	5	6	7	8	9	10	11	12	13	14	Final
AP	19	18	10	10	5	4	4	4	11	9	16	13	10	8	8	5
Coaches	20	16	9	7	7	5	4	5	10	7	16	13	10	8	8	4

== Game summaries ==
=== Army ===
Army Cadets (5–2–1) at #16 Boston College Eagles (5–2)

Quarter	1	2	3	4	Total
Army	7	7	10	7	31
Boston College	13	15	3	14	45

at Alumni Stadium, Chestnut Hill, Massachusetts

- Date: November 10, 1984
- Game attendance: 32,000
- TV announcers (KATZ): Curt Gowdy and Len Dawson

External videos
- Game highlights

Team	Category	Player	Statistics
Army	Passing	Nate Sassaman	4/10, 38 Yds, INT
Army	Rushing	Nate Sassaman	25 Rush, 136 Yds, TD
Army	Receiving	Scott Spellmon	2 Rec, 26 Yds
Boston College	Passing	Doug Flutie	19/29, 311 Yds, 3 TD
Boston College	Rushing	Steve Strachan	15 Rush, 81 Yds, 2 TD
Boston College	Receiving	Kelvin Martin	7 Rec, 126 Yds, 2 TD

Scoring summary

Quarter	Time	Drive			Team	Scoring information	Score	
Quarter	Time	Plays	Yards	TOP	Team	Scoring information	ARMY	BC
1					Army	Doug Black 1-yard touchdown run, Craig Stopa kick good	7	0
1					Boston College	Steve Strachan 1-yard touchdown run, Kevin Snow kick good	7	7
1					Boston College	Scott Gieselman 12-yard touchdown reception from Doug Flutie, Kevin Snow kick no good	7	13
2					Boston College	Kelvin Martin 34-yard touchdown reception from Doug Flutie, Kevin Snow kick good	7	20
2					Boston College	Punt returned 45 yards for touchdown by Kelvin Martin, 2-point pass good	7	28
2					Army	Rob Dickerson 5-yard touchdown reception from Jarvis Hollingsworth, Craig Stopa kick good	14	28
3					Boston College	25-yard field goal by Kevin Snow	14	31
3					Army	Nate Sassaman 8-yard touchdown run, Craig Stopa kick good	21	31
3					Army	40-yard field goal by Craig Stopa	24	31
4					Boston College	Steve Strachan 1-yard touchdown run, Kevin Snow kick good	24	38
4					Army	Jarvis Hollingsworth 10-yard touchdown run, Craig Stopa kick good	24	45
4					Boston College	Kelvin Martin 17-yard touchdown reception from Doug Flutie, Kevin Snow kick good	31	45
"TOP" = time of possession. For other American football terms, see Glossary of American football.							31	45

=== At Miami (FL) ===
Boston College at Miami (FL)

Team	1	2	3	4	Total
• No. 10 Eagles	14	14	3	16	47
No. 12 Hurricanes	7	14	10	14	45

- Date: November 23
- Location: Orange Bowl, Miami, Florida
- Game attendance: 30,325
- TV announcers (CBS): Brent Musburger, Ara Parseghian, and Pat Haden

=== Vs. Houston (Cotton Bowl) ===
	1	2	3	4	Total
No. 8 Eagles	17	14	0	14	45
Cougars	7	7	14	0	28

== Awards and honors ==
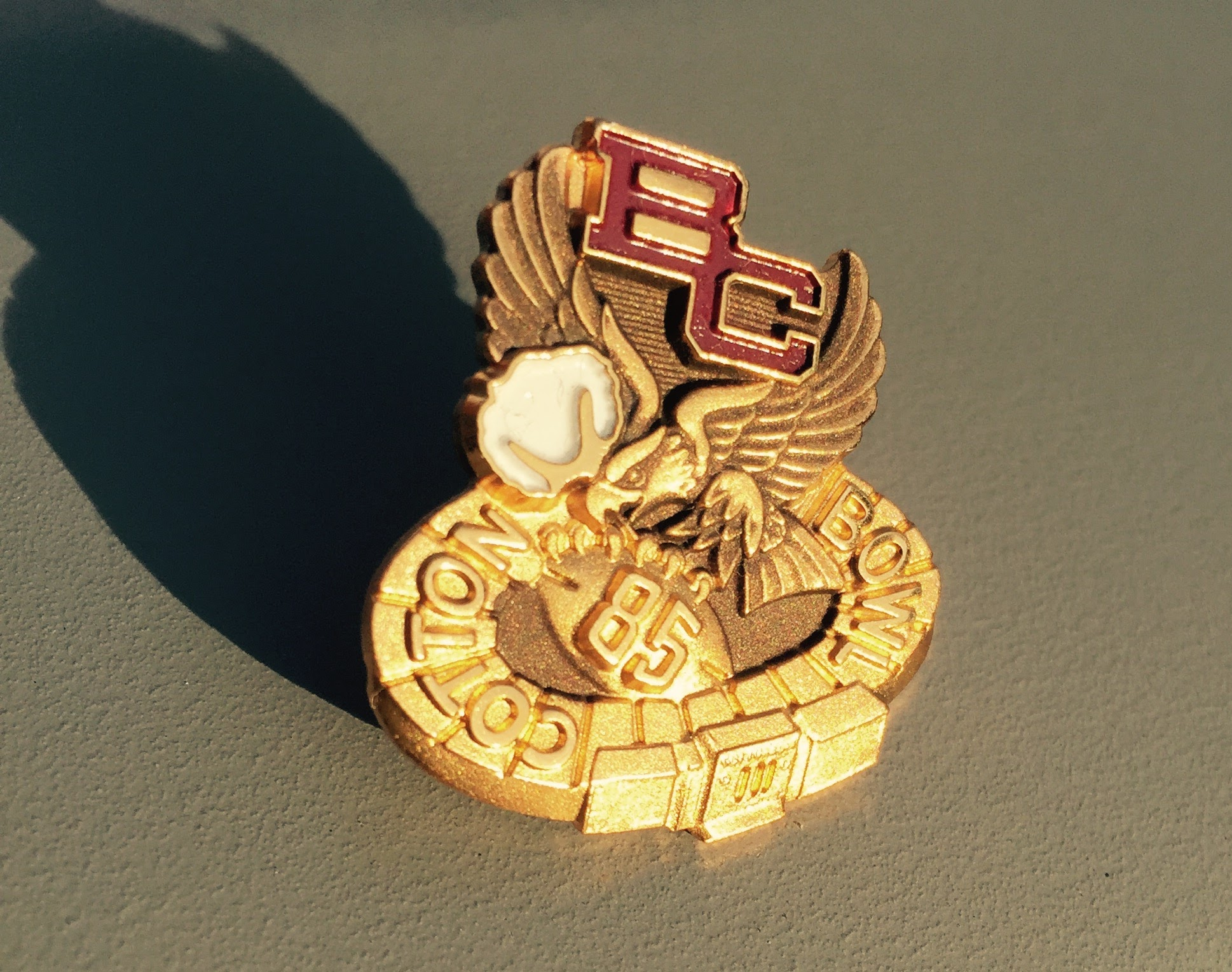
Official 1985 Boston College Cotton Bowl pin given to BC players, coaches, and school administrators.

- Doug Flutie, QB, Heisman Trophy
- Doug Flutie, QB, Walter Camp Award
- Doug Flutie, QB, Maxwell Award
- Doug Flutie, QB, Davey O'Brien Award

== 1984 team players in the NFL ==
The following players were claimed in the 1985 NFL draft.

Player	Position	Round	Pick	NFL club
Gerard Phelan	Wide receiver	4	108	New England Patriots
Mark MacDonald	Guard	5	115	Minnesota Vikings
Doug Flutie	Quarterback	11	285	Los Angeles Rams
Steve Strachan	Running back	11	303	Los Angeles Raiders

Bill Romanowski was also a member of the team and was drafted in 1988.
