= 1984 Penn State Nittany Lions football team =

American college football season

1984 Penn State Nittany Lions football
- Conference: Independent
- Record: 6–5
- Head coach: Joe Paterno (19th season)
- Offensive coordinator: Fran Ganter (1st season)
- Offensive scheme: Pro-style
- Defensive coordinator: Jerry Sandusky (8th season)
- Base defense: 4–3
- Captains: Bill Emerson; Nick Haden; Carmen Masciantonio; Stan Short; Doug Strang
- Home stadium: Beaver Stadium

1984 Major eastern college football independents records
	Conf.					Overall
Team	W		L		T	W		L		T
West Virginia	4	–	2	–	0	8	–	4	–	0
Penn State	3	–	2	–	0	6	–	5	–	0
No. 5 Boston College $	3	–	2	–	0	10	–	2	–	0
Rutgers	3	–	2	–	0	7	–	3	–	0
Temple	2	–	2	–	0	6	–	5	–	0
Pittsburgh	1	–	3	–	0	3	–	7	–	1
Syracuse	1	–	4	–	0	6	–	5	–	0
$ – Lambert Trophy Winner; Rankings from AP Poll

1984 NCAA Division I-A independents football records
	Conf.					Overall
Team	W		L		T	W		L		T
No. 5 Boston College		–		–		10	–	2	–	0
No. 11 South Carolina		–		–		10	–	2	–	0
Army		–		–		8	–	3	–	1
Rutgers		–		–		7	–	3	–	0
No. 17 Florida State		–		–		7	–	3	–	2
Virginia Tech		–		–		8	–	4	–	0
West Virginia		–		–		8	–	4	–	0
No. 18 Miami (FL)		–		–		8	–	5	–	0
Notre Dame		–		–		7	–	5	–	0
Temple		–		–		6	–	5	–	0
Southwestern Louisiana		–		–		6	–	5	–	0
Penn State		–		–		6	–	5	–	0
Syracuse		–		–		6	–	5	–	0
Memphis State		–		–		5	–	5	–	1
Navy		–		–		4	–	6	–	1
Southern Miss		–		–		4	–	7	–	0
Pittsburgh		–		–		3	–	7	–	1
Tulane		–		–		3	–	8	–	0
Cincinnati		–		–		2	–	9	–	0
East Carolina		–		–		2	–	9	–	0
Louisville		–		–		2	–	9	–	0
Rankings from AP Poll

The 1984 Penn State Nittany Lions football team represented the Pennsylvania State University as an independent during the 1984 NCAA Division I-A football season. Led by 19th-year head coach Joe Paterno, the Nittany Lions compiled a record of 6–5. The team home games in Beaver Stadium in University Park, Pennsylvania.

The Nittany Lions were not invited to a bowl game for the first time since 1970.

== Schedule ==
Date	Time	Opponent	Rank	Site	TV	Result	Attendance	Source
September 8	1:30 p.m.	Rutgers	No. 11	Beaver Stadium; University Park, PA		W 15–12	84,409	
September 15	2:05 p.m.	at No. 5 Iowa	No. 12	Kinnick Stadium; Iowa City, IA		W 20–17	66,145	
September 22	1:30 p.m.	No. 8 (I-AA) William & Mary	No. 7	Beaver Stadium; University Park, PA		W 56–18	84,704	
September 29	12:20 p.m.	vs. No. 2 Texas	No. 4	Giants Stadium; East Rutherford, NJ	ESPN	L 3–28	76,883	
October 6	12:20 p.m.	Maryland	No. 11	Beaver Stadium; University Park, PA (rivalry)	ESPN	W 25–24	85,486	
October 13	2:30 p.m.	at Alabama	No. 11	Bryant–Denny Stadium; Tuscaloosa, AL (rivalry)		L 0–6	60,210	
October 20	1:30 p.m.	Syracuse^{†}	No. 19	Beaver Stadium; University Park, PA (rivalry)		W 21–3	85,850	
October 27	7:45 p.m.	at No. 18 West Virginia	No. 19	Mountaineer Field; Morgantown, WV (rivalry)	ESPN	L 14–17	64,879	
November 3	3:50 p.m.	No. 9 Boston College		Beaver Stadium; University Park, PA	ABC	W 37–30	85,690	
November 17	12:20 p.m.	at Notre Dame		Notre Dame Stadium; Notre Dame, IN (rivalry)	ESPN	L 7–44	59,075	
November 24	1:00 p.m.	Pittsburgh		Beaver Stadium; University Park, PA (rivalry)		L 11–31	85,499	
^{†}Homecoming; Rankings from AP Poll released prior to the game; All times are in Eastern time

== Roster ==
1984 Penn State Nittany Lions football team roster
Players
Coaches
Offense

Pos.	#	Name	Class
RB	42	D.J. Dozier	Fr
G	54	Mitch Frerotte	So
C	58	Nick Haden	Sr
FB	27	John Hornyak	So
FB	44	Tim Manoa	So
G	59	Dan Morgan	So
RB	29	Tony Mumford	Sr
C	56	Keith Radecic	So
WR	6	Ray Roundtree	Fr
QB	14	John Shaffer	So
RB	35	Steve Smith	So

Defense

Pos.	#	Name	Class
LB	95	Rogers Alexander	Jr
LB	31	Shane Conlan	So
LB	53	Don Graham	So
S	22	Ray Isom	So
LB	55	Tim Johnson	So
DB	43	Mike Zordich	Jr

Special teams

Pos.	#	Name	Class
PK	10	Massimo Manca	So

Head coach

- Joe Paterno

Coordinators/assistant coaches

- John Bove
- Tom Bradley
- Randy Crowder
- Fran Ganter
- Nick Gasparato
- Bob Phillips
- Jerry Sandusky
- Jim Williams

Legend

- (C) Team captain
- (S) Suspended
- (I) Ineligible
- Injured
- Redshirt

Roster

== NFL draft ==
Four Nittany Lions were drafted in the 1985 NFL draft.

Round	Pick	Overall	Name	Position	Team
6th	6	146	Stan Short	Offensive guard	Detroit Lions
7th	24	192	Nick Haden	Center	Los Angeles Raiders
9th	22	246	Chris Sydnor	Running back/Defensive back	Los Angeles Raiders
12th	20	328	Tony Mumford	Running back	New England Patriots
