= Sassaman =

Sassaman is a surname. Notable people with the surname include:

- Len Sassaman (1980–2011), computer programmer and privacy advocate
- Nathan Sassaman (born 1963), American military officer
