= 1984 Cherry Bowl =

Army Cadets	Michigan State Spartans
(8–3)	(6–5)
10	6
Head coach: Jim Young	Head coach: George Perles
	1	2	3	4	Total
Army	0	7	0	3	10
Michigan State	0	0	0	6	6
- Date: December 22, 1984
- Season: 1984
- Stadium: Silverdome
- Location: Pontiac, Michigan
- MVP: Offensive: Nathan Sassaman, QB, Army; Defensive: Phil Parker (DB, Michigan State)
- Referee: Don Baur (MAC)
- Attendance: 70,332

The 1984 Cherry Bowl was a post-season American college football bowl game at the Silverdome in Pontiac, Michigan between the Army Cadets and the Michigan State Spartans on December 22, 1984. The game was the final contest of the 1984 NCAA Division I-A football season for both teams, and ended in a 10–6 victory for Army.

== Background ==
This was the first Cherry Bowl and first bowl game played in Michigan. This was Army's first ever bowl game and Michigan State's first bowl game since 1966.

== Scoring summary ==
Ralf Mojsiejenko’s 52-yard field-goal attempt went wide left, costing Michigan State three points early. Another chance at the Army 5 for a touchdown led to an interception. A Spartan fumble led to an Army score. Clarence Jones scored the first Army points in a bowl game with a 4-yard touchdown run with 6:31 left in the first half to culminate an 8 play, 46 yard drive. This proved to be the halftime lead for the Cadets. In the fourth quarter, another Spartan fumble led to a score as Craig Stopa increased the lead to 10 with his 38-yard field goal with 8:40 left in the game. Bob Wasczenski caught a 36-yard touchdown pass to narrow the lead with 4:19 remaining. On their conversion attempt, the pass failed, leaving it at 10-6. From that point, Army and Michigan State played stalemate as Army won their first ever bowl game. The Cadets controlled the clock for 34:05. Nathan Sassaman rushed for 136 yards on 28 carries. Yarema was sacked three times and intercepted three times en route to an 11-of-25 155-yard performance.

== Statistics ==
Statistics	Michigan State	Army
First downs	13	15
Rushing yards	89	256
Passing yards	155	10
Total yards	244	266
Passes (Att-Comp-Int)	25–11–3	2–1–1
Punts–average	4–55.8	7–36.7
Fumbles–lost	3–2	2–1
Penalties–yards	4–26	1–7
