= 1984 Pittsburgh Panthers football team =

American college football season

1984 Pittsburgh Panthers football
- Conference: Independent
- Record: 3–7–1
- Head coach: Foge Fazio (3rd season)
- Offensive coordinator: Joe Moore (3rd season)
- Offensive scheme: West Coast
- Defensive coordinator: Bob Junko (2nd season)
- Base defense: Multiple front
- Home stadium: Pitt Stadium

1984 Major eastern college football independents records
	Conf.					Overall
Team	W		L		T	W		L		T
West Virginia	4	–	2	–	0	8	–	4	–	0
Penn State	3	–	2	–	0	6	–	5	–	0
No. 5 Boston College $	3	–	2	–	0	10	–	2	–	0
Rutgers	3	–	2	–	0	7	–	3	–	0
Temple	2	–	2	–	0	6	–	5	–	0
Pittsburgh	1	–	3	–	0	3	–	7	–	1
Syracuse	1	–	4	–	0	6	–	5	–	0
$ – Lambert Trophy Winner; Rankings from AP Poll

1984 NCAA Division I-A independents football records
	Conf.					Overall
Team	W		L		T	W		L		T
No. 5 Boston College		–		–		10	–	2	–	0
No. 11 South Carolina		–		–		10	–	2	–	0
Army		–		–		8	–	3	–	1
Rutgers		–		–		7	–	3	–	0
No. 17 Florida State		–		–		7	–	3	–	2
Virginia Tech		–		–		8	–	4	–	0
West Virginia		–		–		8	–	4	–	0
No. 18 Miami (FL)		–		–		8	–	5	–	0
Notre Dame		–		–		7	–	5	–	0
Temple		–		–		6	–	5	–	0
Southwestern Louisiana		–		–		6	–	5	–	0
Penn State		–		–		6	–	5	–	0
Syracuse		–		–		6	–	5	–	0
Memphis State		–		–		5	–	5	–	1
Navy		–		–		4	–	6	–	1
Southern Miss		–		–		4	–	7	–	0
Pittsburgh		–		–		3	–	7	–	1
Tulane		–		–		3	–	8	–	0
Cincinnati		–		–		2	–	9	–	0
East Carolina		–		–		2	–	9	–	0
Louisville		–		–		2	–	9	–	0
Rankings from AP Poll

The 1984 Pittsburgh Panthers football team represented the University of Pittsburgh as an independent during the 1984 NCAA Division I-A football season. The Panthers offense scored 178 points while the defense allowed 247 points. At season's end, the Panthers were not ranked in the national polls. The Panthers had their first losing season since 1972.

== Schedule ==
Date	Time	Opponent	Rank	Site	TV	Result	Attendance	Source
September 1	3:30 p.m.	BYU	No. 3	Pitt Stadium; Pittsburgh, PA	ESPN	L 14–20	40,263	
September 15	3:30 p.m.	No. 15 Oklahoma	No. 17	Pitt Stadium; Pittsburgh, PA	ABC	L 10–42	40,075	
September 22	1:00 p.m.	at Temple		Veterans Stadium; Philadelphia, PA		L 12–13	40,000	
September 29	12:30 p.m.	West Virginia		Pitt Stadium; Pittsburgh, PA (Backyard Brawl)		L 10–28	58,032	
October 6	12:00 p.m.	East Carolina		Pitt Stadium; Pittsburgh, PA	KATZ	W 17–10	26,475	
October 13	12:00 p.m.	at No. 17 South Carolina		Williams–Brice Stadium; Columbia, SC	KATZ	L 21–45	73,100	
October 20	12:00 p.m.	at No. 9 Miami (FL)		Miami Orange Bowl; Miami, FL	USA	L 7–27	32,872	
October 27	1:30 p.m.	Navy^{†}		Pitt Stadium; Pittsburgh, PA		T 28–28	34,715	
November 3	12:00 p.m.	at Syracuse		Carrier Dome; Syracuse, NY (rivalry)		L 7–13	46,489	
November 10	12:00 p.m.	Tulane		Pitt Stadium; Pittsburgh, PA		W 21–10	20,159	
November 24	1:00 p.m.	at Penn State		Beaver Stadium; University Park, PA (rivalry)		W 31–11	85,499	
^{†}Homecoming; Rankings from AP Poll released prior to the game; All times are in Eastern time

== Roster ==
1984 Pittsburgh Panthers football team roster
Players
Coaches
Offense

Pos.	#	Name	Class
G	68	Bob Brown	Jr
QB	10	John Cummings	Jr
OT	79	Bill Fralic	Sr
FB	34	Craig Heyward	Fr
TE	80	Tom Johnson	Jr

Defense

Pos.	#	Name	Class
LB	54	Troy Benson	Sr
DT	95	Bob Buczkowski	Jr
DE	52	Tom Crawford	So
DE	56	Chris Doleman	Sr
FS	11	Bill McCormick	Jr
DE	90	Tony Woods	So

Special teams

Pos.	#	Name	Class

Head coach

- Foge Fazio

Coordinators/assistant coaches

Legend

- (C) Team captain
- (S) Suspended
- (I) Ineligible
- Injured
- Redshirt

== Coaching staff ==
1984 Pittsburgh Panthers football staff
Coaching staff: Foge Fazio – Head coach; Joe Moore – Assistant head coach/offensive coordinator/offensive line; Bob Junko – Defensive coordinator/linebackers; Dino Folino – Defensive backs; Carmen Grosso – Tight ends; Kent Schoolfield – Wide receivers; Gerry Solomon – Defensive ends; Don Thompson – Defensive line; Ron Turner – Quarterbacks; Andy Urbanic – Running backs	Support staff: Alex Kramer – Administrative assistant; Bob LaCivita – Recruiting coordinator; Curt Cignetti – Graduate assistant; Jay Venuto – Graduate assistant; Hal Hunter – Graduate assistant; Charles Jones – Graduate assistant	Strength and conditioning staff: Buddy Morris – Weight training coordinator

== Game summaries ==
=== BYU ===
Team	1	2	3	4	Total
• Cougars	0	3	6	11	20
No. 3 Panthers	0	0	14	0	14

- Date: September 1
- Location: Pitt Stadium, Pittsburgh, Pennsylvania
- Game start: 3:30 p.m. EDT
- Game attendance: 40,263
- Game weather: Overcast, 73 °F (23 °C)
- TV announcers (ESPN): Jim Thacker (play-by-play) and Irv Brown (analyst)

Scoring summary
2		BYU	Lee Johnson 37-yard field goal	BYU 3–0
3		Pitt	Bill Callahan 78-yard interception return (kick)	Pitt 7–3
3	11:35	Pitt	Marc Bailey 1-yard run (kick)	Pitt 14–3
3		BYU	Lakai Heimuli 12-yard run (pass failed)	Pitt 14–9
4		BYU	Lee Johnson 23-yard field goal	Pitt 14–12
4	1:37	BYU	Adam Haysbert 50-yard pass from Robbie Bosco (Bosco run)	BYU 20–14

Team	Category	Player	Statistics
BYU	Passing	Robbie Bosco	25/43, 325 yards, TD, 2 INT
BYU	Rushing	Lakei Heimuli	8 rushes, 44 yards, TD
BYU	Receiving	Adam Haysbert	9 receptions, 141 yards, TD
Pittsburgh	Passing	John Congemi	17/32, 171 yards, 2 INT
Pittsburgh	Rushing	Marc Bailey	14 rushes, 40 yards, TD
Pittsburgh	Receiving	Bill Wallace	7 receptions, 68 yards

== Team players drafted into the NFL ==
Player	Position	Round	Pick	NFL club
Bill Fralic	Guard	1	2	Atlanta Falcons
Chris Doleman	Defensive end	1	4	Minnesota Vikings
Troy Benson	Linebacker	5	120	New York Jets
Marlon McIntyre	Running back	8	218	Los Angeles Rams
Bill Wallace	Back	12	319	New York Jets

== Awards and honors ==
- Bill Fralic, Sixth in Heisman Trophy voting
