= 1984 Army Cadets football team =

American college football season

1984 Army Cadets football

Cherry Bowl champion

Cherry Bowl, W 10–6 vs. Michigan State
- Conference: Independent
- Record: 8–3–1
- Head coach: Jim Young (2nd season)
- Offensive scheme: Triple option
- Defensive coordinator: Bob Sutton (2nd season)
- Base defense: 4–3
- Captain: Senior class
- Home stadium: Michie Stadium

1984 NCAA Division I-A independents football records
	Conf.					Overall
Team	W		L		T	W		L		T
No. 5 Boston College		–		–		10	–	2	–	0
No. 11 South Carolina		–		–		10	–	2	–	0
Army		–		–		8	–	3	–	1
Rutgers		–		–		7	–	3	–	0
No. 17 Florida State		–		–		7	–	3	–	2
Virginia Tech		–		–		8	–	4	–	0
West Virginia		–		–		8	–	4	–	0
No. 18 Miami (FL)		–		–		8	–	5	–	0
Notre Dame		–		–		7	–	5	–	0
Temple		–		–		6	–	5	–	0
Southwestern Louisiana		–		–		6	–	5	–	0
Penn State		–		–		6	–	5	–	0
Syracuse		–		–		6	–	5	–	0
Memphis State		–		–		5	–	5	–	1
Navy		–		–		4	–	6	–	1
Southern Miss		–		–		4	–	7	–	0
Pittsburgh		–		–		3	–	7	–	1
Tulane		–		–		3	–	8	–	0
Cincinnati		–		–		2	–	9	–	0
East Carolina		–		–		2	–	9	–	0
Louisville		–		–		2	–	9	–	0
Rankings from AP Poll

The 1984 Army Cadets football team was an American football team that represented the United States Military Academy as an independent during the 1984 NCAA Division I-A football season. In their second season under head coach Jim Young, the Cadets compiled an 8–3–1 record and outscored their opponents by a combined total of 320 to 218. In the annual Army–Navy Game, the Cadets defeated Navy by a 28–11 score. The Cadets also defeated Michigan State, 10–6, in the 1984 Cherry Bowl.

== Schedule ==
Date	Opponent	Site	TV	Result	Attendance	Source
September 15	Colgate	Michie Stadium; West Point, NY		W 41–15	32,032	
September 22	at Tennessee	Neyland Stadium; Knoxville, TN		T 24–24	89,639	
September 29	Duke	Michie Stadium; West Point, NY		W 13–9	37,026	
October 6	Harvard	Michie Stadium; West Point, NY		W 33–11	40,504	
October 13	at Rutgers	Giants Stadium; East Rutherford, NJ		L 7–14	34,752	
October 20	Penn	Michie Stadium; West Point, NY		W 48–13	59,075	
October 27	at Syracuse	Carrier Dome; Syracuse, NY		L 16–27	41,438	
November 3	Air Force	Michie Stadium; West Point, NY (Commander-in-Chief's Trophy)		W 24–12		
November 10	at No. 16 Boston College	Alumni Stadium; Chestnut Hill, MA		L 31–45	32,000	
November 17	vs. Montana	Olympic Memorial Stadium; Tokyo, Japan (Mirage Bowl)		W 45–31	60,000	
December 1	vs. Navy	Veterans Stadium; Philadelphia, PA (Army–Navy Game)	CBS	W 28–11	73,180	
December 22	vs. Michigan State	Pontiac Silverdome; Pontiac, MI (Cherry Bowl)		W 10–6	70,332	
Rankings from AP Poll released prior to the game

== Roster ==
1984 Army Cadets football team roster
Players
Coaches
Offense

Pos.	#	Name	Class
FB		Doug Black	Jr
RB		Dee Bryant
RB		Ed Cole
QB		Tory Crawford
WR		Rob Dickerson
QB		Rob Healy
OL		Karl Heineman
RB		Ron Herring
RB		Jarvis Hollingsworth
RB		Clarence Jones
OL		Bill Kime
RB		William Lampley
OL		Vince McDermott
RB		Kevin McKelvy
OL		Bryan Parlier	Jr
RB		Tom Perry
RB		Andy Peterson
FB		Dave Pratt
OL		Ron Rice
QB	11	Nate Sassaman	Sr
RB		Scott Schwartz
OL		Don Smith
WR		Scott Spellmon
WR		Ben White
OL		David Woolfolk
RB		Benny Wright

Defense

Pos.	#	Name	Class
DL		Brad Allen
LB		Marty Baptiste
LB		Jim Gentile
DB		Eric Griffin
DE		Kurt Gutierrez
DL		Jim Jennings
CB		Kermit McKelvey
S		Doug Pavek
LB		John Roney
DL		Mike Sears
DB		Bob Silver
DB		Mike Tease
DL		Rob Ulses

Special teams

Pos.	#	Name	Class
P		Dave Grasch
K		John Lopes
K		Craig Stopa

Head coach

- Jim Young

Coordinators/assistant coaches

Legend

- (C) Team captain
- (S) Suspended
- (I) Ineligible
- Injured
- Redshirt

== Season summary ==
=== vs Navy ===
External videos
- 1984 Army vs. Navy - TV broadcast (edited)

=== Cherry Bowl (vs Michigan State) ===
External videos
- 1984 Cherry Bowl highlights
