= 1984 Rutgers Scarlet Knights football team =

American college football season

1984 Rutgers Scarlet Knights football
- Conference: Independent
- Record: 7–3
- Head coach: Dick Anderson (1st season)
- Offensive coordinator: Dick Curl (2nd season)
- Defensive coordinator: Otto Kneidinger (1st season)
- Home stadium: Rutgers Stadium; Giants Stadium

1984 Major eastern college football independents records
| | Conf. | | | | | Overall |
| Team | W | | L | | T | W | | L | | T |
|---|---|---|---|---|---|---|---|---|---|---|
| West Virginia | 4 | – | 2 | – | 0 | 8 | – | 4 | – | 0 |
| Penn State | 3 | – | 2 | – | 0 | 6 | – | 5 | – | 0 |
| No. 5 Boston College $ | 3 | – | 2 | – | 0 | 10 | – | 2 | – | 0 |
| Rutgers | 3 | – | 2 | – | 0 | 7 | – | 3 | – | 0 |
| Temple | 2 | – | 2 | – | 0 | 6 | – | 5 | – | 0 |
| Pittsburgh | 1 | – | 3 | – | 0 | 3 | – | 7 | – | 1 |
| Syracuse | 1 | – | 4 | – | 0 | 6 | – | 5 | – | 0 |
$ – Lambert Trophy Winner; Rankings from AP Poll

1984 NCAA Division I-A independents football records
| | Conf. | | | | | Overall |
| Team | W | | L | | T | W | | L | | T |
|---|---|---|---|---|---|---|---|---|---|---|
| No. 5 Boston College | | – | | – | | 10 | – | 2 | – | 0 |
| No. 11 South Carolina | | – | | – | | 10 | – | 2 | – | 0 |
| Army | | – | | – | | 8 | – | 3 | – | 1 |
| Rutgers | | – | | – | | 7 | – | 3 | – | 0 |
| No. 17 Florida State | | – | | – | | 7 | – | 3 | – | 2 |
| Virginia Tech | | – | | – | | 8 | – | 4 | – | 0 |
| West Virginia | | – | | – | | 8 | – | 4 | – | 0 |
| No. 18 Miami (FL) | | – | | – | | 8 | – | 5 | – | 0 |
| Notre Dame | | – | | – | | 7 | – | 5 | – | 0 |
| Temple | | – | | – | | 6 | – | 5 | – | 0 |
| Southwestern Louisiana | | – | | – | | 6 | – | 5 | – | 0 |
| Penn State | | – | | – | | 6 | – | 5 | – | 0 |
| Syracuse | | – | | – | | 6 | – | 5 | – | 0 |
| Memphis State | | – | | – | | 5 | – | 5 | – | 1 |
| Navy | | – | | – | | 4 | – | 6 | – | 1 |
| Southern Miss | | – | | – | | 4 | – | 7 | – | 0 |
| Pittsburgh | | – | | – | | 3 | – | 7 | – | 1 |
| Tulane | | – | | – | | 3 | – | 8 | – | 0 |
| Cincinnati | | – | | – | | 2 | – | 9 | – | 0 |
| East Carolina | | – | | – | | 2 | – | 9 | – | 0 |
| Louisville | | – | | – | | 2 | – | 9 | – | 0 |
Rankings from AP Poll

The 1984 Rutgers Scarlet Knights football team was an American football team that represented Rutgers University as an independent during the 1984 NCAA Division I-A football season. In their first season under head coach Dick Anderson, the Scarlet Knights compiled a 7–3 record and outscored their opponents by a total of 213 to 155.

The Scarlet Knights gained an average of 190.9 passing yards and 174.5 rushing yards per game. On defense, they held opponents to 183.2 passing yards and 145.3 rushing yards per game. The team's individual statistical leaders included:

- Passing. Quarterback Eric Hochberg completed 163 of 306 passes (53.3%) for 1,909 yards, nine touchdowns and seven interceptions.
- Rushing. Running back Albert Smith led the team with 869 rushing yards on 178 carries for an average of 4.9 yards per carry.
- Receiving. Wide receiver Andrew Baker led the team with 42 receptions for 533 receiving yards and three touchdowns.
- Scoring. Placekicker Tom Angstad led the team in scoring with 77 points (20 extra points and 19 field goals).

Wide receiver Andrew Baker and tight end Alan Andrews were selected by the Associated Press (AP) as first-team players on the 1984 All-East football team. Five Rutgers players were named to the second team: running back Albert Smith, center Joe DiGilio, middle guard George Pickel, linebacker Tyronne Stowe, and defensive back Harold Young.

The team played its home games at Rutgers Stadium in Piscataway, New Jersey.

== Schedule ==
| Date | Opponent | Site | Result | Attendance | Source |
|---|---|---|---|---|---|
| September 8 | at No. 11 Penn State | Beaver Stadium; University Park, PA | L 12–15 | 84,409 | |
| September 15 | Temple | Rutgers Stadium; Piscataway, NJ | W 10–9 | 16,784 | |
| September 22 | at Syracuse | Carrier Dome; Syracuse, NY | W 19–0 | 41,810 | |
| September 29 | Cincinnati | Rutgers Stadium; Piscataway, NJ | W 43–15 | 18,657 | |
| October 6 | at Kentucky | Commonwealth Stadium; Lexington, KY | L 14–27 | 58,010 | |
| October 13 | Army | Giants Stadium; East Rutherford, NJ | W 14–7 | | |
| October 20 | Louisville^{†} | Rutgers Stadium; Piscataway, NJ | W 38–21 | 25,764 | |
| October 27 | at No. 11 Boston College | Alumni Stadium; Chestnut Hill, MA | L 23–35 | 32,000 | |
| November 10 | No. 19 West Virginia | Giants Stadium; East Rutherford, NJ | W 23–19 | 25,140 | |
| November 17 | Colgate | Rutgers Stadium; Piscataway, NJ | W 17–7 | 22,217 | |
^{†}Homecoming; Rankings from AP Poll released prior to the game

== Roster ==
1984 Rutgers Scarlet Knights football team roster
Players
Coaches
Offense

| Pos. | # | Name | Class |
|---|---|---|---|
| QB | | Eric Hochberg | Jr |
| OT | | Harry Swayne | So |

Defense

| Pos. | # | Name | Class |
|---|---|---|---|
| S | | Jacque LaPrarie | Sr |
| LB | | Tyronne Stowe | So |

Special teams

| Pos. | # | Name | Class |

Head coach

- Dick Anderson

Coordinators/assistant coaches

Legend

- (C) Team captain
- (S) Suspended
- (I) Ineligible
- Injured
- Redshirt
