= Ed Emory =

American football player and coach (1937–2013)

Biographical details
- Born: April 14, 1937; Lancaster, South Carolina, U.S.
- Died: January 4, 2013 (aged 75); Wadesboro, North Carolina, U.S.

Playing career
- 1957–1959: East Carolina
- Position: Guard

Coaching career (HC unless noted)
- 1960–1962: Kinston HS (NC) (assistant)
- 1963–1966: Wadesboro HS (NC)
- 1967: Bowman HS (NC)
- 1968: Wake Forest (assistant)
- 1969–1972: Brevard HS (SC)
- 1973: Clemson (JV coordinator)
- 1974–1975: Clemson (RB)
- 1976: Clemson (OL)
- 1978–1979: Georgia Tech (DL/RC)
- 1980–1984: East Carolina
- 1989-1992: Anson Senior HS (NC)
- 2001–2006: Richmond Senior HS (NC)

Head coaching record
- Overall: 26–29 (college)

Edward Harrell Emory Sr. (April 14, 1937 – January 4, 2013) was an American football player and coach. He became East Carolina University's 14th head football coach in 1980. In 1983, he guided the Pirates to an 8–3 record and a No. 20 ranking in the final AP poll. His three losses came at the hands of Florida State, Florida, and Miami (Florida). The football team lost by a combined score of 13 points. Before coaching, Emory went to school at East Carolina College and was a three-year varsity letter winner and was third-team All-American in his senior year. He was inducted into the ECU Hall of Fame in 2003.

Emory returned to coaching at the high school level and served as head coach of the perennial North Carolina powerhouse, Richmond Senior High School in Rockingham, North Carolina, from 2001 to 2006, compiling at 77–7 record in that six-year span.

Emory died at his home in Wadesboro, North Carolina on January 4, 2013.

== Head coaching record ==
=== College ===
Year	Team	Overall	Conference	Standing	Bowl/playoffs	Coaches^{#}	AP^{°}
East Carolina Pirates (NCAA Division I-A independent) (1985–1988)
1980	East Carolina	4–7					
1981	East Carolina	5–6					
1982	East Carolina	7–4					
1983	East Carolina	8–3				25	20
1984	East Carolina	2–9					
East Carolina:		26–29					
Total:		26–29					
^{#}Rankings from final Coaches Poll.; ^{°}Rankings from final AP Poll.
