= 1984 South Carolina Gamecocks football team =

American college football season

1984 South Carolina Gamecocks football

Gator Bowl, L 14–21 vs. Oklahoma State
- Conference: Independent

Ranking
- Coaches: No. 13
- AP: No. 11
- Record: 10–2
- Head coach: Joe Morrison (2nd season)
- Offensive coordinator: Frank Sadler (2nd season)
- Defensive coordinator: Tom Gadd (2nd season)
- Home stadium: Williams–Brice Stadium

1984 NCAA Division I-A independents football records
| | Conf. | | | | | Overall |
| Team | W | | L | | T | W | | L | | T |
|---|---|---|---|---|---|---|---|---|---|---|
| No. 5 Boston College | | – | | – | | 10 | – | 2 | – | 0 |
| No. 11 South Carolina | | – | | – | | 10 | – | 2 | – | 0 |
| Army | | – | | – | | 8 | – | 3 | – | 1 |
| Rutgers | | – | | – | | 7 | – | 3 | – | 0 |
| No. 17 Florida State | | – | | – | | 7 | – | 3 | – | 2 |
| Virginia Tech | | – | | – | | 8 | – | 4 | – | 0 |
| West Virginia | | – | | – | | 8 | – | 4 | – | 0 |
| No. 18 Miami (FL) | | – | | – | | 8 | – | 5 | – | 0 |
| Notre Dame | | – | | – | | 7 | – | 5 | – | 0 |
| Temple | | – | | – | | 6 | – | 5 | – | 0 |
| Southwestern Louisiana | | – | | – | | 6 | – | 5 | – | 0 |
| Penn State | | – | | – | | 6 | – | 5 | – | 0 |
| Syracuse | | – | | – | | 6 | – | 5 | – | 0 |
| Memphis State | | – | | – | | 5 | – | 5 | – | 1 |
| Navy | | – | | – | | 4 | – | 6 | – | 1 |
| Southern Miss | | – | | – | | 4 | – | 7 | – | 0 |
| Pittsburgh | | – | | – | | 3 | – | 7 | – | 1 |
| Tulane | | – | | – | | 3 | – | 8 | – | 0 |
| Cincinnati | | – | | – | | 2 | – | 9 | – | 0 |
| East Carolina | | – | | – | | 2 | – | 9 | – | 0 |
| Louisville | | – | | – | | 2 | – | 9 | – | 0 |
Rankings from AP Poll

The 1984 South Carolina Gamecocks football team represented the University of South Carolina as an independent during the 1984 NCAA Division I-A football season. Led by second-year head coach Joe Morrison, the team played its home games at Williams–Brice Stadium. After only three eight-win seasons in program history and three consecutive non-winning seasons, the 1984 Gamecocks made a run at a national championship. South Carolina started the season 9–0, including wins over No. 12 Georgia, Pittsburgh, Notre Dame and No. 11 Florida State, and were ranked No. 2 in the country. However, in the tenth game of the season, they lost to an unranked Navy team, which had a losing record. In the final two games of the season, South Carolina defeated archrival Clemson, becoming the first team in school history to win ten games, and then lost to No. 9 Oklahoma State in the Gator Bowl, finishing the season with a 10–2 record.

The 1984 Gamecocks had several nicknames. The defense was known as the "Fire Ants", while the team as a whole was known as "Black Magic" due to their success, remarkable comebacks, distinctive black jerseys, and Morrison's all-black attire.

The Gamecocks finished No. 11 in the final AP Poll. At the time, the No. 11 final ranking was the highest ever achieved by South Carolina. It was only the second final ranking in school history, and the first since 1958. Joe Morrison won the Walter Camp Coach of the Year Award. The peak ranking of No. 2 remains the highest in school history.

== Schedule ==
| Date | Opponent | Rank | Site | TV | Result | Attendance | Source |
|---|---|---|---|---|---|---|---|
| September 8 | The Citadel | | Williams–Brice Stadium; Columbia, SC | | W 31–24 | 71,200 | |
| September 22 | Duke | | Williams–Brice Stadium; Columbia, SC | | W 21–0 | 68,300 | |
| September 29 | No. 12 Georgia | | Williams–Brice Stadium; Columbia, SC (rivalry) | | W 17–10 | 74,325 | |
| October 6 | Kansas State | | Williams–Brice Stadium; Columbia, SC | | W 49–17 | 67,200 | |
| October 13 | Pittsburgh | No. 17 | Williams–Brice Stadium; Columbia, SC | KATZ Sports | W 45–21 | 73,100 | |
| October 20 | at Notre Dame | No. 11 | Notre Dame Stadium; Notre Dame, IN | ESPN | W 36–32 | 59,075 | |
| October 27 | East Carolina | No. 9 | Williams–Brice Stadium; Columbia, SC | | W 42–20 | 73,800 | |
| November 3 | at NC State | No. 5 | Carter–Finley Stadium; Raleigh, NC | | W 35–28 | 46,200 | |
| November 10 | No. 11 Florida State | No. 5 | Williams–Brice Stadium; Columbia, SC | ABC | W 38–26 | 75,000 | |
| November 17 | at Navy | No. 2 | Navy–Marine Corps Memorial Stadium; Annapolis, MD | HTS | L 21–38 | 27,234 | |
| November 24 | at Clemson | No. 9 | Memorial Stadium; Clemson, SC (rivalry) | Raycom Sports | W 22–21 | 80,500 | |
| December 28 | vs. No. 9 Oklahoma State | No. 7 | Gator Bowl Stadium; Jacksonville, FL (Gator Bowl) | ABC | L 14–21 | 82,138 | |
Rankings from AP Poll released prior to the game
