= 1984 Florida State Seminoles football team =

American college football season

1984 Florida State Seminoles football

Florida Citrus Bowl, T 17–17 vs. Georgia
- Conference: Independent

Ranking
- Coaches: No. 19
- AP: No. 17
- Record: 7–3–2
- Head coach: Bobby Bowden (9th season)
- Offensive coordinator: Wayne McDuffie (2nd season)
- Offensive scheme: No-huddle spread
- Defensive coordinator: Mickey Andrews (1st season)
- Base defense: 4–3
- Captains: Greg Allen; Joe Wessel; Henry Taylor
- Home stadium: Doak Campbell Stadium

1984 NCAA Division I-A independents football records
	Conf.					Overall
Team	W		L		T	W		L		T
No. 5 Boston College		–		–		10	–	2	–	0
No. 11 South Carolina		–		–		10	–	2	–	0
Army		–		–		8	–	3	–	1
Rutgers		–		–		7	–	3	–	0
No. 17 Florida State		–		–		7	–	3	–	2
Virginia Tech		–		–		8	–	4	–	0
West Virginia		–		–		8	–	4	–	0
No. 18 Miami (FL)		–		–		8	–	5	–	0
Notre Dame		–		–		7	–	5	–	0
Temple		–		–		6	–	5	–	0
Southwestern Louisiana		–		–		6	–	5	–	0
Penn State		–		–		6	–	5	–	0
Syracuse		–		–		6	–	5	–	0
Memphis State		–		–		5	–	5	–	1
Navy		–		–		4	–	6	–	1
Southern Miss		–		–		4	–	7	–	0
Pittsburgh		–		–		3	–	7	–	1
Tulane		–		–		3	–	8	–	0
Cincinnati		–		–		2	–	9	–	0
East Carolina		–		–		2	–	9	–	0
Louisville		–		–		2	–	9	–	0
Rankings from AP Poll

The 1984 Florida State Seminoles football team represented Florida State University as an independent during the 1984 NCAA Division I-A football season. Led by ninth-year head coach Bobby Bowden, the Seminoles compiled a record of 7–3–2 with a tie in the Florida Citrus Bowl against Georgia. Florida State played home games at Doak Campbell Stadium in Tallahassee, Florida.

Running back Greg Allen became the first Heisman Trophy finalist at Florida State, finishing in seventh place.

== Schedule ==
Date	Time	Opponent	Rank	Site	TV	Result	Attendance	Source
September 1	7:00 p.m.	East Carolina	No. 20	Doak Campbell Stadium; Tallahassee, FL		W 48–17	54,211	
September 15	1:30 p.m.	at Kansas	No. 18	Memorial Stadium; Lawrence, KS		W 42–16	38,600	
September 22	4:00 p.m.	at No. 4 Miami (FL)	No. 15	Miami Orange Bowl; Miami, FL (rivalry)	CBS	W 38–3	60,210	
September 29	7:00 p.m.	Temple	No. 9	Doak Campbell Stadium; Tallahassee, FL		W 44–27	56,892	
October 6	8:30 p.m.	at Memphis State	No. 6	Liberty Bowl Memorial Stadium; Memphis, TN		T 17–17	27,740	
October 13	7:00 p.m.	No. 16 Auburn	No. 9	Doak Campbell Stadium; Tallahassee, FL		L 41–42	58,671	
October 20	7:00 p.m.	Tulane	No. 15	Doak Campbell Stadium; Tallahassee, FL		W 27–6	54,785	
November 3	7:30 p.m.	at Arizona State	No. 14	Sun Devil Stadium; Tempe, AZ		W 52–44	68,574	
November 10	3:30 p.m.	at No. 5 South Carolina	No. 11	Williams–Brice Stadium; Columbia, SC	ABC	L 26–38	75,000	
November 17	7:00 p.m.	Chattanooga^{†}	No. 17	Doak Campbell Stadium; Tallahassee, FL		W 37–0	55,443	
December 1	3:30 p.m.	No. 3 Florida	No. 12	Doak Campbell Stadium; Tallahassee, FL (rivalry)	ABC	L 17–27	58,930	
December 22	12:30 p.m.	vs. Georgia	No. 15	Florida Citrus Bowl; Orlando, FL (Florida Citrus Bowl)	NBC	T 17–17	51,821	
^{†}Homecoming; Rankings from AP Poll released prior to the game

== Game summaries ==
=== Miami (FL) ===
#15 Florida State at #4 Miami (FL)

Team	1	2	3	4	Total
• Seminoles	6	3	15	14	38
Hurricanes	0	0	0	3	3

- Date: September 22
- Location: Orange Bowl
- Game attendance: 62,210
- Television network: CBS

Scoring summary
Q1	10:16	FSU	Schmidt 54 yard field goal	FSU 3–0
Q1	3:47	FSU	Schmidt 40 yard field goal	FSU 6–0
Q2	4:10	FSU	Schmidt 38 yard field goal	FSU 9–0
Q3	13:21	FSU	Hester 77 yard run (Jones pass from Thomas)	FSU 17–0
Q3	9:08	FSU	Snipes 4 yard run (Schmidt kick)	FSU 24–0
Q4	14:05	MIA	Cox 36 yard field goal	FSU 24–3
Q4	7:39	FSU	Jones 25 yard pass from Thomas (Schmidt kick)	FSU 31–3
Q4	6:24	FSU	Snipes 3 yard run (Schmidt kick)	FSU 38–3

- Jessie Hester 5 Rec, 116 Yds

=== Auburn ===
#16 Auburn at #9 Florida State

Team	1	2	3	4	Total
• Tigers	10	12	7	13	42
Seminoles	3	14	15	9	41

- Date: October 13
- Location: Doak Campbell Stadium, Tallahassee, Florida
- Game attendance: 58,671

=== Arizona State ===
#14 Florida State at Arizona State

Team	1	2	3	4	Total
• Seminoles	0	17	21	14	52
Sun Devils	10	10	10	14	44

- Date: November 3
- Location: Sun Devil Stadium
- Game attendance: 68,754

Scoring summary
Q1	9:32	ASU	Zendejas 18 yard field goal	ASU 3–0
Q1	4:57	ASU	Allen 13 yard pass from Van Raaphorst (Zendejas kick)	ASU 10–0
Q2	13:58	ASU	Allen 4 yard pass from Van Raaphorst (Zendejas kick)	ASU 17–0
Q2	10:39	FSU	Wessel 8 yard blocked punt return (Schmidt kick)	ASU 17–7
Q2	7:36	ASU	Zendejas 38 yard field goal	ASU 20–7
Q2	4:26	FSU	Schmidt 52 yard field goal	ASU 20–10
Q2	0:07	FSU	Allen 1 yard run (Schmidt kick)	ASU 20–17
Q3	9:52	FSU	Hester 28 yard pass from Coker (Schmidt kick)	FSU 24–20
Q3	7:19	ASU	Zendejas 34 yard field goal	FSU 24–23
Q3	6:28	FSU	Allen 81 yard run (Schmidt kick)	FSU 31–23
Q3	3:51	FSU	Hester 69 yard pass from Coker (Schmidt kick)	FSU 38–23
Q3	2:09	ASU	Amoia 14 yard pass from Van Raaphorst (Zendejas kick)	FSU 38–30
Q4	10:30	ASU	Cl. Jones 2 yard run (Schmidt kick)	FSU 45–30
Q4	9:00	FSU	Wessel 34 yard blocked punt return (Schmidt kick)	FSU 52–30
Q4	7:32	ASU	Cox 4 yard pass from Van Raaphorst (pass failed)	FSU 52–37
Q4	2:43	ASU	Amoia 2 yard run (Crawford run)	FSU 52–44

- Greg Allen 22 Rush, 223 Yds
- Jessie Hester 3 Rec, 104 Yds

=== Florida ===
Florida Gators (8–1–1) at Florida State Seminoles (7–2–1)

Quarter	1	2	3	4	Total
Florida	7	10	7	3	27
Florida St	0	3	7	7	17

at Doak Campbell Stadium • Tallahassee, Florida

- Date: December 1
- Game weather: Rain
- Game attendance: 58,930
- NoleFan.org

Game information

Florida

- Kerwin Bell
  5/14, 71 Yds, 2 TD
- Neal Anderson
  94 Rush Yds
- Lorenzo Hampton
  94 Rush Yds, TD

Florida St

- Kirk Coker
  5/11, 48 Yds, TD
- Roosevelt Snipes
  20 Rush, 108 Yds
- Jessie Hester
  4 Rec, 47 Yds, TD

Scoring summary

Quarter	Time	Drive			Team	Scoring information	Score	
Quarter	Time	Plays	Yards	TOP	Team	Scoring information	FLA	FSU
1	12:08				Florida	Frankie Neal 33-yard touchdown reception from Kerwin Bell, Bobby Raymond kick good	7	0
2	7:42				Florida St	23-yard field goal by Derek Schmidt	7	3
2	5:44				Florida	John L. Williams 5-yard touchdown reception from Kerwin Bell, Bobby Raymond kick good	14	3
2	0:08				Florida	33-yard field goal by Bobby Raymond	17	3
3	11:29				Florida	Lorenzo Hampton 8-yard touchdown run, kick good	24	3
3	6:33				Florida St	Jessie Hester 10-yard touchdown reception from Kirk Coker, Derek Schmidt kick good	24	10
4	6:32				Florida	26-yard field goal by Bobby Raymond	27	10
4	1:14				Florida St	Pat Carter 8-yard touchdown reception from Eric Thomas, Derek Schmidt kick good	27	17
"TOP" = time of possession. For other American football terms, see Glossary of American football.							27	17

== Roster ==
1984 Florida State Seminoles football team roster
Players
Coaches
Offense

Pos.	#	Name	Class
RB	26	Greg Allen	Sr
QB	11	Kirk Coker	Jr
G	64	Jamie Dukes	Jr
WR	4	Jessie Hester	Sr
RB	24	Darrin Holloman	Fr
FB	43	Cletis Jones	Jr
RB	20	Roosevelt Snipes	Jr
QB	1	Eric Thomas	Jr

Defense

Pos.	#	Name	Class
S	31	Billy Allen	Sr
S	13	Kim Mack	Sr
CB	32	Martin Mayhew	Fr
S	43	Bobby McCrary	Sr
LB	38	Paul McGowan	Fr
CB	8	Eric Riley	Sr

Special teams

Pos.	#	Name	Class
P	6	Louis Berry	So
K	18	Derek Schmidt	Fr

Head coach

- Bobby Bowden

Coordinators/assistant coaches

- Chuck Amato (DL)
- Mickey Andrews (DC/DB)
- Art Baker (QB)
- John Eason (WR)
- Jim Gladden (LB)
- Bob Harbison (OL)
- Gene McDowell (LB)
- Wayne McDuffie (OC/OL)
- Billy Sexton (RB)
- Dave Van Halanger (Str+Cond)

Legend

- (C) Team captain
- (S) Suspended
- (I) Ineligible
- Injured
- Redshirt

Roster
Last update: 27 Jul 2019
