= 1984 Southwestern Louisiana Ragin' Cajuns football team =

American college football season

1984 Southwestern Louisiana Ragin' Cajuns football
- Conference: Independent
- Record: 6–5
- Head coach: Sam Robertson (5th season)
- Home stadium: Cajun Field

1984 NCAA Division I-A independents football records
	Conf.					Overall
Team	W		L		T	W		L		T
No. 5 Boston College		–		–		10	–	2	–	0
No. 11 South Carolina		–		–		10	–	2	–	0
Army		–		–		8	–	3	–	1
Rutgers		–		–		7	–	3	–	0
No. 17 Florida State		–		–		7	–	3	–	2
Virginia Tech		–		–		8	–	4	–	0
West Virginia		–		–		8	–	4	–	0
No. 18 Miami (FL)		–		–		8	–	5	–	0
Notre Dame		–		–		7	–	5	–	0
Temple		–		–		6	–	5	–	0
Southwestern Louisiana		–		–		6	–	5	–	0
Penn State		–		–		6	–	5	–	0
Syracuse		–		–		6	–	5	–	0
Memphis State		–		–		5	–	5	–	1
Navy		–		–		4	–	6	–	1
Southern Miss		–		–		4	–	7	–	0
Pittsburgh		–		–		3	–	7	–	1
Tulane		–		–		3	–	8	–	0
Cincinnati		–		–		2	–	9	–	0
East Carolina		–		–		2	–	9	–	0
Louisville		–		–		2	–	9	–	0
Rankings from AP Poll

The 1984 Southwestern Louisiana Ragin' Cajuns football team was an American football team that represented the University of Southwestern Louisiana (now known as the University of Louisiana at Lafayette) as an independent during the 1984 NCAA Division I-A football season. In their fifth year under head coach Sam Robertson, the team compiled a 6–5 record.

== Schedule ==
Date	Opponent	Site	Result	Attendance	Source
September 1	at Chattanooga	Chamberlain Field; Chattanooga, TN	L 7–9	9,438	
September 8	at Louisiana Tech	Joe Aillet Stadium; Ruston, LA (rivalry)	W 17–16	16,800	
September 15	Northeast Louisiana	Cajun Field; Lafayette, LA (rivalry)	L 6–7	23,531	
September 22	at Alabama	Bryant–Denny Stadium; Tuscaloosa, AL	L 14–37	56,431	
October 6	Wichita State	Cajun Field; Lafayette, LA	W 31–3	21,507	
October 13	at Memphis State	Liberty Bowl Memorial Stadium; Memphis, TN	L 7–20	38,309	
October 20	at San Jose State	Spartan Stadium; San Jose, CA	W 35–28	6,023	
October 27	Southern Miss	Cajun Field; Lafayette, LA	W 13–7	19,605	
November 3	East Carolina	Cajun Field; Lafayette, LA	W 42–24	23,357	
November 10	at McNeese State	Cowboy Stadium; Lake Charles, LA (Cajun Crown)	L 17–30	23,000	
November 17	at Tulsa	Skelly Stadium; Tulsa, OK	W 18–17	13,104	
