= 1984 Florida Citrus Bowl =

American college football game

1984 Florida Citrus Growers Association Florida Citrus Bowl
Georgia Bulldogs	Florida State Seminoles
(7–4)	(7–3–1)
SEC	Independent
17	17
Head coach: Vince Dooley	Head coach: Bobby Bowden
	AP / Coaches; 15 / 16
	1	2	3	4	Total
Georgia	0	14	0	3	17
Florida State	0	0	3	14	17
- Date: December 22, 1984
- Season: 1984
- Stadium: Florida Citrus Bowl
- Location: Orlando, Florida
- MVP: QB James Jackson (Georgia)
- Referee: Donald Safrit (ACC)
- Attendance: 51,821

United States TV coverage
- Network: NBC
- Announcers: Don Criqui & Bob Trumpy

The 1984 Florida Citrus Bowl was a college football postseason bowl game that featured the Georgia Bulldogs and the Florida State Seminoles. The game took place on December 22, 1984, and ended in a 17–17 draw.

== Background ==
A 7–1 start and a #8 ranking came crashing down after a loss to Florida in the World's Largest Outdoor Cocktail Party rivalry game, as they then lost to #15 Auburn and Georgia Tech to crater into the Citrus Bowl without a ranking, and a (tied for) 3rd-place finish in the Southeastern Conference. A 4–0 start (and a #6 ranking) for the Seminoles ended with a 3–3–1 finish. This was Georgia's first Florida Citrus Bowl since 1974, along with their 5th straight bowl appearance. This was Florida State's first Florida Citrus Bowl since 1977 and 3rd straight bowl appearance.

== Game summary ==
- Georgia – Lars Tate 4-yard touchdown run (Butler kick), 5:26 remaining in 2nd quarter
- Georgia – Lars Tate 2-yard touchdown run (Butler kick), 1:08 remaining in 2nd quarter
- Florida State – Schmidt 32-yard field goal, 10:26 remaining in 3rd quarter
- Florida State – Smith 1-yard touchdown run (run failed), 14:21 remaining in 4th quarter
- Georgia – Kevin Butler 36-yard field goal, 12:10 remaining in 4th quarter
- Florida State – Joe Wessel 14-yard touchdown return of blocked punt (Darrin Holloman run), 3:58 remaining in 4th quarter

Jackson threw 7-of-16 for 159 yards in an MVP effort.

== Aftermath ==
Florida State has not returned to the Citrus Bowl since this game, while Georgia returned in 1993, 2004, 2009 and 2013.

== Statistics ==
Statistics	Florida State	Georgia
First downs	18	15
Rushing yards	161	189
Passing yards	85	178
Passes (Comp-Attempts-Int.)	10–27–2	9–18–1
Return yardage	122	22
Fumbles–lost	3–1	5–1
Punts–average	8 (38.6)	8 (37.1)
Yards penalized	8–65	6–42
