= 1984 Syracuse Orangemen football team =

American college football season

1984 Syracuse Orangemen football
- Conference: Independent
- Record: 6–5
- Head coach: Dick MacPherson (4th season)
- Captains: Marty Chalk; Jaime Covington; Jim Gorzalski; Jamie Kimmel
- Home stadium: Carrier Dome

1984 Major eastern college football independents records
	Conf.					Overall
Team	W		L		T	W		L		T
West Virginia	4	–	2	–	0	8	–	4	–	0
Penn State	3	–	2	–	0	6	–	5	–	0
No. 5 Boston College $	3	–	2	–	0	10	–	2	–	0
Rutgers	3	–	2	–	0	7	–	3	–	0
Temple	2	–	2	–	0	6	–	5	–	0
Pittsburgh	1	–	3	–	0	3	–	7	–	1
Syracuse	1	–	4	–	0	6	–	5	–	0
$ – Lambert Trophy Winner; Rankings from AP Poll

1984 NCAA Division I-A independents football records
	Conf.					Overall
Team	W		L		T	W		L		T
No. 5 Boston College		–		–		10	–	2	–	0
No. 11 South Carolina		–		–		10	–	2	–	0
Army		–		–		8	–	3	–	1
Rutgers		–		–		7	–	3	–	0
No. 17 Florida State		–		–		7	–	3	–	2
Virginia Tech		–		–		8	–	4	–	0
West Virginia		–		–		8	–	4	–	0
No. 18 Miami (FL)		–		–		8	–	5	–	0
Notre Dame		–		–		7	–	5	–	0
Temple		–		–		6	–	5	–	0
Southwestern Louisiana		–		–		6	–	5	–	0
Penn State		–		–		6	–	5	–	0
Syracuse		–		–		6	–	5	–	0
Memphis State		–		–		5	–	5	–	1
Navy		–		–		4	–	6	–	1
Southern Miss		–		–		4	–	7	–	0
Pittsburgh		–		–		3	–	7	–	1
Tulane		–		–		3	–	8	–	0
Cincinnati		–		–		2	–	9	–	0
East Carolina		–		–		2	–	9	–	0
Louisville		–		–		2	–	9	–	0
Rankings from AP Poll

The 1984 Syracuse Orangemen football team represented Syracuse University an independent during the 1984 NCAA Division I-A football season. Led by fourth-year head coach Dick MacPherson, the Orangemen compiled a record of 6–5. Syracuse played home games at the Carrier Dome in Syracuse, New York.

== Schedule ==
Date	Opponent	Site	Result	Attendance	Source
September 8	at Maryland	Byrd Stadium; College Park, MD	W 23–7	38,850	
September 15	at Northwestern	Dyche Stadium; Evanston, IL	W 13–12	23,199	
September 22	Rutgers	Carrier Dome; Syracuse, NY	L 0–19	41,810	
September 29	No. 1 Nebraska	Carrier Dome; Syracuse, NY	W 17–9	47,280	
October 6	at Florida	Florida Field; Gainesville, FL	L 0–16	70,189	
October 13	at West Virginia	Mountaineer Field; Morgantown, WV (rivalry)	L 10–20	57,741	
October 20	at No. 19 Penn State	Beaver Stadium; University Park, PA (rivalry)	L 3–21	85,860	
October 27	Army	Carrier Dome; Syracuse, NY	W 27–16	41,438	
November 3	Pittsburgh	Carrier Dome; Syracuse, NY (rivalry)	W 13–7	46,489	
November 10	Navy	Carrier Dome; Syracuse, NY	W 29–0	44,090	
November 17	at No. 13 Boston College	Sullivan Stadium; Foxborough, MA	L 16–24	60,890	
Rankings from AP Poll released prior to the game
