= 1984 Notre Dame Fighting Irish football team =

American college football season

1984 Notre Dame Fighting Irish football

Aloha Bowl, L 20–27 vs. SMU
- Conference: Independent
- Record: 7–5
- Head coach: Gerry Faust (4th season)
- Defensive coordinator: A. J. Christoff (1st season)
- MVP: Allen Pinkett
- Captains: Mike Golic; Joe Johnson; Larry Williams
- Home stadium: Notre Dame Stadium

1984 NCAA Division I-A independents football records
	Conf.					Overall
Team	W		L		T	W		L		T
No. 5 Boston College		–		–		10	–	2	–	0
No. 11 South Carolina		–		–		10	–	2	–	0
Army		–		–		8	–	3	–	1
Rutgers		–		–		7	–	3	–	0
No. 17 Florida State		–		–		7	–	3	–	2
Virginia Tech		–		–		8	–	4	–	0
West Virginia		–		–		8	–	4	–	0
No. 18 Miami (FL)		–		–		8	–	5	–	0
Notre Dame		–		–		7	–	5	–	0
Temple		–		–		6	–	5	–	0
Southwestern Louisiana		–		–		6	–	5	–	0
Penn State		–		–		6	–	5	–	0
Syracuse		–		–		6	–	5	–	0
Memphis State		–		–		5	–	5	–	1
Navy		–		–		4	–	6	–	1
Southern Miss		–		–		4	–	7	–	0
Pittsburgh		–		–		3	–	7	–	1
Tulane		–		–		3	–	8	–	0
Cincinnati		–		–		2	–	9	–	0
East Carolina		–		–		2	–	9	–	0
Louisville		–		–		2	–	9	–	0
Rankings from AP Poll

The 1984 Notre Dame Fighting Irish football team was an American football team that represented the University of Notre Dame as an independent during the 1984 NCAA Division I-A football season. In their fourth year under head coach Gerry Faust, the Irish compiled a 7–5 record, outscored opponents by a total of 279 to 212, and were unranked for the fourth consecutive year in the final AP and UPI polls. In five games against ranked opponents, Notre Dame defeated No. 7 LSU and No. 14 USC, but lost to No. 14 Miami, and No. 11 South Carolina, and concluded the season with a loss to No. 10 SMU in the Aloha Bowl.

Tight end Mark Bavaro and center Mike Kelley received first-team honors from at least one selector on the 1984 All-America college football team. The team's statistical leaders included quarterback Steve Beuerlein (1,920 passing yards), running back Allen Pinkett (1,105 rushing yards, 108 points scored), Bavaro (32 receptions, 395 receiving yards), and linebacker Mike Kovaleski (108 tackles).

The team played its home games at Notre Dame Stadium in Notre Dame, Indiana.

== Schedule ==
Date	Time	Opponent	Rank	Site	TV	Result	Attendance	Source
September 8	1:30 p.m.	vs. Purdue	No. 8	Hoosier Dome; Indianapolis, IN (rivalry)		L 21–23	60,672	
September 15	1:00 p.m.	at Michigan State		Spartan Stadium; East Lansing, MI (rivalry)		W 20–17	76,919	
September 22	2:30 p.m.	Colorado		Notre Dame Stadium; Notre Dame, IN		W 55–14	59,075	
September 29	3:50 p.m.	at Missouri	No. 19	Memorial Stadium; Columbia, MO	ABC	W 16–14	70,915	
October 6	7:45 p.m.	No. 14 Miami (FL)	No. 17	Notre Dame Stadium; Notre Dame, IN (rivalry)	ESPN	L 13–31	59,075	
October 13	12:20 p.m.	Air Force		Notre Dame Stadium; Notre Dame, IN (rivalry)	ESPN	L 7–21	59,075	
October 20	12:20 p.m.	No. 11 South Carolina		Notre Dame Stadium; Notre Dame, IN	ESPN	L 32–36	59,075	
October 27	3:50 p.m.	at No. 6 LSU		Tiger Stadium; Baton Rouge, LA	ABC	W 30–22	78,033	
November 3	12:10 p.m.	vs. Navy		Giants Stadium; East Rutherford, NJ (rivalry)	ESPN	W 18–17	61,795	
November 17	12:20 p.m.	Penn State		Notre Dame Stadium; Notre Dame, IN (rivalry)	ESPN	W 44–7	59,075	
November 24	3:40 p.m.	at No. 14 USC		Los Angeles Memorial Coliseum; Los Angeles, CA (rivalry)	CBS	W 19–7	66,342	
December 29	8:00 p.m.	vs. No. 10 SMU	No. 17	Aloha Stadium; Halawa, HI (Aloha Bowl)	ESPN	L 20–27	41,777	
Rankings from AP Poll released prior to the game; All times are in Eastern time

== Game summaries ==
=== vs Purdue ===
#8 Notre Dame Fighting Irish (0–0) vs. Purdue Boilermakers (0–0)

Quarter	1	2	3	4	Total
Purdue	3	10	3	7	23
Notre Dame	14	0	0	7	21

at Hoosier Dome, Indianapolis, Indiana

- Date: September 8, 1984
- Game weather: Indoors (dome)
- Game attendance: 60,672
- Recap/Box Score

Game information

First quarter

- PUR – Mike Rendina 31-yard field goal, 13:16. Purdue 3–0. Drive: 3 plays, -1 yard, 1:38.
- ND – Allen Pinkett 11-yard run (John Carney kick), 7:55. Notre Dame 7–3. Drive: 10 plays, 77 yards, 5:21.
- ND – Mark Brooks 3-yard run (John Carney kick), 1:39. Notre Dame 14–3. Drive: 10 plays, 70 yards, 4:12.

Second quarter

- PUR – Jeff Price 6-yard pass from Jim Everett, 10:11. Notre Dame 14–10. Drive: 14 plays, 86 yards, 6:28.
- PUR – Mike Rendina 18-yard field goal, 0:00. Notre Dame 14–13. Drive: 13 plays, 62 yards, 5:59.

Third quarter

- PUR – Mike Rendina 20-yard field goal, 3:47. Purdue 16–14. Drive: 13 plays, 92 yards, 5:54.

Fourth quarter

- PUR – Jeff Price 14-yard pass from Jim Everett (Mike Rendina kick), 13:57. Purdue 23–14. Drive: 6 plays, 88 yards, 2:32.
- ND – Allen Pinkett 6-yard run (John Carney kick), 4:21. Purdue 23–21. Drive: 11 plays, 66 yards, 4:16.

Top passers

- PUR – Jim Everett – 20/28, 255 yards, 2 TD, INT
- ND – Steve Beuerlein – 13/20, 233 yards, 3 INT

Top rushers

- PUR – Rodney Carter – 22 rushes, 58 yards
- ND – Allen Pinkett – 22 rushes, 69 yards, 2 TD

Top receivers

- PUR – Steve Griffin – 5 receptions, 79 yards
- ND – Joe Howard – 3 receptions, 61 yards

External videos
- Television broadcast

=== At Michigan State ===
Team	1	2	3	4	Total
• Fighting Irish	0	3	7	14	24
Spartans	17	0	3	0	20

- Date: September 15
- Location: Spartan Stadium, East Lansing, Michigan
- Game attendance: 76,919

Scoring summary
Q1	MSU	Butler 15 yard run (kick failed)	MSU 6–0
Q1	MSU	Butler 23 yard run (Ingram pass from Yarema)	MSU 14–0
Q1	MSU	Mojsiejenko 24 yard field goal	MSU 17–0
Q2	ND	Carney 42 yard field goal	MSU 17–3
Q3	ND	Pinkett 40 yard pass from Beuerlein (Carney kick)	MSU 17–10
Q3	MSU	Mojsiejenko 43 yard field goal	MSU 20–10
Q4	ND	Jackson 8 yard pass from Beuerlein (Carney kick)	MSU 20–17
Q4	ND	Pinkett 5 yard run (Carney kick)	ND 24–20

=== South Carolina ===
Team	1	2	3	4	Total
• Gamecocks	7	7	0	22	36
Fighting Irish	0	17	9	6	32

- Date: October 20
- Location: Notre Dame Stadium
- Game attendance: 59,075

Scoring summary
Q1	SCAR	Mitchell 1 yard run (Hogler kick)	SCAR 7–0
Q2	ND	Pinkett 4 yard run (Carney kick)	Tie 7–7
Q2	ND	Bavaro 5 yard pass from Beuerlein (Carney kick)	ND 14–7
Q2	SCAR	Hagood 2 yard run (Hogler kick)	Tie 14–14
Q2	ND	Carney 48 yard field goal	ND 17–14
Q3	ND	Carney 47 yard field goal	ND 20–14
Q3	ND	Beuerlein 6 yard pass from Pinkett (pass failed)	ND 26–14
Q4	SCAR	Hold 1 yard run (Hagood run)	ND 26–22
Q4	SCAR	Hold 33 yard run (Hogler kick)	SCAR 29–26
Q4	SCAR	Lewis 4 yard run (Hogler kick)	SCAR 36–26
Q4	ND	Pinkett 1 yard run (pass failed)	SCAR 36–32

ND: Third straight home loss (first time since 1956)

=== vs Navy ===
Team	1	2	3	4	Total
• Fighting Irish	7	0	0	11	18
Midshipmen	0	7	7	3	17

- Date: November 3

Scoring summary
1	ND	Pinkett 1-yard run (Carney kick)	ND 7-0
2	NAVY	Berner 6-yard run (Solomon kick)	Tied 7-7
3	NAVY	Byrne 2-yard pass from Lauletta (Solomon kick)	NAVY 14-7
4	NAVY	Solomon 32-yard field goal	NAVY 17-7
4	ND	Pinkett 1-yard run (Beuerlein to Howard pass)	NAVY 17-15
4	ND	Carney 44-yard field goal	ND 18-17

== Roster ==
1984 Notre Dame Fighting Irish football team roster
Players
Coaches
Offense

Pos.	#	Name	Class
QB	2	Terry Andrysiak	Fr
OL		John Askin
TE	82	Mark Bavaro	Sr
QB	7	Steve Beuerlein	So
RB		Mark Brooks
WR	81	Tim Brown	Fr
RB		Ray Carter
WR		Pat Cusack
RB		Ian DeHueck
OL		Tom Doerger
RB		Lester Flemons
TE		Ricky Gray
QB		Scott Grooms
WR	24	Joe Howard	Sr
WR		Milt Jackson
RB		Alonzo Jefferson
OL		Mike Kelley
RB		Dave Matcholf
WR		Alvin Miller
RB		Tom Monohan
RB		Jeff O'Neill
OL		Mike Perrino
RB	20	Allen Pinkett	Jr
OT	62	Ron Plantz	Jr
OL		Tim Scannell
RB		Chris Smith
RB		Frank Stams
WR		Reggie Ward
TE		Joel Williams
G	75	Larry Williams	Sr

Defense

Pos.	#	Name	Class
CB	40	Pat Ballage	Jr
LB		Robert Banks
DB	13	Pat Cummings	Sr
LB	43	Rick DiBernardo	Jr
DE	71	Eric Dorsey	Jr
DB		Hiwatha Francisco
LB	58	Tony Furjanic	Jr
DE	78	Mike Gann	Sr
LB	55	Mike Golic	Sr
DL		Mike Griffin
DB		Mike Haywood
S	27	Joe Johnson	Sr
DL		Wally Kleine
LB		Mike Kovaleski
LB		Mike Larkin
DB		Steve Lawrence
LB		John McCabe
LB	48	John Wackowski	Sr
LB		Ron Weissenhofer	So
DB		Troy Wilson	So

Special teams

Pos.	#	Name	Class
K	18	John Carney	So
K		Pat Chura
P		Mike Viracola
K		Hal Von Wyl

Head coach

- Gerry Faust

Coordinators/assistant coaches

Legend

- (C) Team captain
- (S) Suspended
- (I) Ineligible
- Injured
- Redshirt

== Awards and honors ==
Three Notre Dame players received recognition on the 1984 All-America college football team:

- Tight end Mark Bavaro received first-team honors from the Associated Press (AP).
- Center Mike Kelley received first-team All-America honors from the Gannett News Service.
- Guard Larry Williams received second-team honors from the United Press International and third-team honors from the AP.

Former Fighting Irish halfback and fullback Red Sitko, who played on championship teams from 1946 to 1949, was inducted into the College Football Hall of Fame.
