= 1984 West Virginia Mountaineers football team =

American college football season

1984 West Virginia Mountaineers football

Bluebonnet Bowl champion

Astro-Bluebonnet Bowl, W 31–14 vs. TCU
- Conference: Independent

Ranking
- Coaches: No. 18
- Record: 8–4
- Head coach: Don Nehlen (5th season)
- Offensive coordinator: Russ Jacques
- Defensive coordinator: Dennis Brown (5th season)
- Home stadium: Mountaineer Field

1984 Major eastern college football independents records
	Conf.					Overall
Team	W		L		T	W		L		T
West Virginia	4	–	2	–	0	8	–	4	–	0
Penn State	3	–	2	–	0	6	–	5	–	0
No. 5 Boston College $	3	–	2	–	0	10	–	2	–	0
Rutgers	3	–	2	–	0	7	–	3	–	0
Temple	2	–	2	–	0	6	–	5	–	0
Pittsburgh	1	–	3	–	0	3	–	7	–	1
Syracuse	1	–	4	–	0	6	–	5	–	0
$ – Lambert Trophy Winner; Rankings from AP Poll

1984 NCAA Division I-A independents football records
	Conf.					Overall
Team	W		L		T	W		L		T
No. 5 Boston College		–		–		10	–	2	–	0
No. 11 South Carolina		–		–		10	–	2	–	0
Army		–		–		8	–	3	–	1
Rutgers		–		–		7	–	3	–	0
No. 17 Florida State		–		–		7	–	3	–	2
Virginia Tech		–		–		8	–	4	–	0
West Virginia		–		–		8	–	4	–	0
No. 18 Miami (FL)		–		–		8	–	5	–	0
Notre Dame		–		–		7	–	5	–	0
Temple		–		–		6	–	5	–	0
Southwestern Louisiana		–		–		6	–	5	–	0
Penn State		–		–		6	–	5	–	0
Syracuse		–		–		6	–	5	–	0
Memphis State		–		–		5	–	5	–	1
Navy		–		–		4	–	6	–	1
Southern Miss		–		–		4	–	7	–	0
Pittsburgh		–		–		3	–	7	–	1
Tulane		–		–		3	–	8	–	0
Cincinnati		–		–		2	–	9	–	0
East Carolina		–		–		2	–	9	–	0
Louisville		–		–		2	–	9	–	0
Rankings from AP Poll

The 1984 West Virginia Mountaineers football team represented West Virginia University in the 1984 NCAA Division I-A football season. It was the Mountaineers' 92nd overall season and they competed as a Division I-A Independent. The team was led by head coach Don Nehlen, in his fifth year, and played their home games at Mountaineer Field in Morgantown, West Virginia. They finished the season with a record of eight wins and four losses (8–4 overall) and with a victory over TCU in the Bluebonnet Bowl.

By defeating both Pittsburgh and Penn State for the first time since 1953, West Virginia achieved its second outright Old Ironsides Trophy victory. 1984 was the final season in which the trophy was in contention, making West Virginia the last official champions.

== Schedule ==
Date	Opponent	Rank	Site	TV	Result	Attendance	Source
September 1	Ohio		Mountaineer Field; Morgantown, WV		W 38–0	57,070	
September 8	Louisville		Mountaineer Field; Morgantown, WV		W 30–6	55,002	
September 15	at Virginia Tech		Lane Stadium; Blacksburg, VA (rivalry)	USA	W 14–7	48,100	
September 22	Maryland	No. 18	Mountaineer Field; Morgantown, WV (rivalry)		L 17–20	58,353	
September 29	at Pittsburgh		Pitt Stadium; Pittsburgh, PA (Backyard Brawl)		W 28–10	58,032	
October 13	Syracuse		Mountaineer Field; Morgantown, WV (rivalry)		W 20–10	57,791	
October 20	No. 4 Boston College	No. 20	Mountaineer Field; Morgantown, WV	ABC	W 21–20	60,286	
October 27	No. 19 Penn State	No. 18	Mountaineer Field; Morgantown, WV (rivalry)	ESPN	W 17–14	64,879	
November 3	Virginia	No. 12	Mountaineer Field; Morgantown, WV		L 7–27	56,453	
November 10	at Rutgers	No. 19	Giants Stadium; East Rutherford, NJ		L 19–23	25,140	
November 17	at Temple		Veterans Stadium; Philadelphia, PA		L 17–19	21,875	
December 31	vs. TCU		Houston Astrodome; Houston, TX (Astro-Bluebonnet Bowl)		W 31–14	43,260	
Rankings from AP Poll released prior to the game

== Roster ==
1984 West Virginia Mountaineers football team roster
Players
Coaches
Offense

Pos.	#	Name	Class
WR	1	Gary Mullen	Sr
QB	17	Mike Timko	Fr
FB	36	Ron Wolfley	Sr
WR	48	Willie Drewrey	Sr
OT	77	Brian Jozwiak	Jr
WR	87	Brian Krawchyk	Jr

Defense

Pos.	#	Name	Class
LB	40	Bob Davis	Sr
LB	42	Scott Snyder	So
LB	43	Cam Zopp	Sr
DT	98	David Grant	Fr
DT	99	Jeff Lucas	So

Special teams

Pos.	#	Name	Class
K	3	Paul Woodside	Sr
P	11	Steve Superick	Jr

Head coach

- Don Nehlen

Coordinators/assistant coaches

Legend

- (C) Team captain
- (S) Suspended
- (I) Ineligible
- Injured
- Redshirt
