= 1984 Temple Owls football team =

American college football season

1984 Temple Owls football
- Conference: Independent
- Record: 6–5
- Head coach: Bruce Arians (2nd season)
- Home stadium: Veterans Stadium

1984 Major eastern college football independents records
	Conf.					Overall
Team	W		L		T	W		L		T
West Virginia	4	–	2	–	0	8	–	4	–	0
Penn State	3	–	2	–	0	6	–	5	–	0
No. 5 Boston College $	3	–	2	–	0	10	–	2	–	0
Rutgers	3	–	2	–	0	7	–	3	–	0
Temple	2	–	2	–	0	6	–	5	–	0
Pittsburgh	1	–	3	–	0	3	–	7	–	1
Syracuse	1	–	4	–	0	6	–	5	–	0
$ – Lambert Trophy Winner; Rankings from AP Poll

1984 NCAA Division I-A independents football records
	Conf.					Overall
Team	W		L		T	W		L		T
No. 5 Boston College		–		–		10	–	2	–	0
No. 11 South Carolina		–		–		10	–	2	–	0
Army		–		–		8	–	3	–	1
Rutgers		–		–		7	–	3	–	0
No. 17 Florida State		–		–		7	–	3	–	2
Virginia Tech		–		–		8	–	4	–	0
West Virginia		–		–		8	–	4	–	0
No. 18 Miami (FL)		–		–		8	–	5	–	0
Notre Dame		–		–		7	–	5	–	0
Temple		–		–		6	–	5	–	0
Southwestern Louisiana		–		–		6	–	5	–	0
Penn State		–		–		6	–	5	–	0
Syracuse		–		–		6	–	5	–	0
Memphis State		–		–		5	–	5	–	1
Navy		–		–		4	–	6	–	1
Southern Miss		–		–		4	–	7	–	0
Pittsburgh		–		–		3	–	7	–	1
Tulane		–		–		3	–	8	–	0
Cincinnati		–		–		2	–	9	–	0
East Carolina		–		–		2	–	9	–	0
Louisville		–		–		2	–	9	–	0
Rankings from AP Poll

The 1984 Temple Owls football team was an American football team that represented Temple University as an independent during the 1984 NCAA Division I-A football season. In its second season under head coach Bruce Arians, the team compiled a 6–5 record and outscored opponents by a total of 226 to 180. The team played its home games at Veterans Stadium in Philadelphia.

The team's statistical leaders included Lee Saltz with 1,337 passing yards, Paul Palmer with 885 rushing yards and 60 points scored, and Willie Marshall with 503 receiving yards.

== Schedule ==
Date	Opponent	Site	Result	Attendance	Source
September 8	at East Carolina	Ficklen Memorial Stadium; Greenville, NC	W 17–0	31,479	
September 15	at Rutgers	Rutgers Stadium; Piscataway, NJ	L 9–10	16,784	
September 22	Pittsburgh	Veterans Stadium; Philadelphia, PA	W 13–12	40,000	
September 29	at No. 9 Florida State	Doak Campbell Stadium; Tallahassee, FL	L 27–44	56,892	
October 6	at William & Mary	Cary Field; Williamsburg, VA	W 28–14	10,400	
October 13	at No. 4 Boston College	Alumni Stadium; Chestnut Hill, MA	L 10–24	32,000	
October 20	Delaware	Veterans Stadium; Philadelphia, PA	L 19–34	9,526	
October 27	Virginia Tech	Veterans Stadium; Philadelphia, PA	L 7–9	10,124	
November 3	Cincinnati	Veterans Stadium; Philadelphia, PA	W 42–10	6,529	
November 17	West Virginia	Veterans Stadium; Philadelphia, PA	W 19–17	21,875	
November 30	vs. Toledo	Atlantic City Convention Hall; Atlantic City, NJ	W 35–6	5,586	
Rankings from AP Poll released prior to the game
