= 1984 Virginia Tech Hokies football team =

American college football season

1984 Virginia Tech Hokies football

Independence Bowl, L 7–23 vs. Air Force
- Conference: Independent
- Record: 8–4
- Head coach: Bill Dooley (7th season)
- Offensive coordinator: Pat Watson
- Defensive coordinator: Bob Brush (1st season)
- Home stadium: Lane Stadium

1984 NCAA Division I-A independents football records
	Conf.					Overall
Team	W		L		T	W		L		T
No. 5 Boston College		–		–		10	–	2	–	0
No. 11 South Carolina		–		–		10	–	2	–	0
Army		–		–		8	–	3	–	1
Rutgers		–		–		7	–	3	–	0
No. 17 Florida State		–		–		7	–	3	–	2
Virginia Tech		–		–		8	–	4	–	0
West Virginia		–		–		8	–	4	–	0
No. 18 Miami (FL)		–		–		8	–	5	–	0
Notre Dame		–		–		7	–	5	–	0
Temple		–		–		6	–	5	–	0
Southwestern Louisiana		–		–		6	–	5	–	0
Penn State		–		–		6	–	5	–	0
Syracuse		–		–		6	–	5	–	0
Memphis State		–		–		5	–	5	–	1
Navy		–		–		4	–	6	–	1
Southern Miss		–		–		4	–	7	–	0
Pittsburgh		–		–		3	–	7	–	1
Tulane		–		–		3	–	8	–	0
Cincinnati		–		–		2	–	9	–	0
East Carolina		–		–		2	–	9	–	0
Louisville		–		–		2	–	9	–	0
Rankings from AP Poll

The 1984 Virginia Tech Hokies football team represented the Virginia Polytechnic Institute and State University (Virginia Tech) in the 1984 NCAA Division I-A football season as a Division I-A Independent. The team was led by head coach Bill Dooley, in his seventh year, and played their home games at Lane Stadium in Blacksburg, Virginia. They finished the season with a record of eight wins and four losses (8–4), and with a loss against Air Force in the Independence Bowl. Bruce Smith won the Outland Trophy and was the first pick overall in the 1985 NFL draft.

== Schedule ==
Date	Time	Opponent	Site	TV	Result	Attendance	Source
September 8		at Wake Forest	Groves Stadium; Winston-Salem, NC		W 21–20	26,543	
September 15		West Virginia	Lane Stadium; Blacksburg, VA (rivalry)	USA	L 7–14	48,100	
September 22		Richmond	Lane Stadium; Blacksburg, VA		W 21–13	36,200	
September 29		Virginia	Lane Stadium; Blacksburg, VA (rivalry)		L 23–26	50,600	
October 6	1:30 p.m.	vs. VMI	Foreman Field; Norfolk, VA (Oyster Bowl, rivalry)		W 54–7		
October 13		Duke	Lane Stadium; Blacksburg, VA	HTS	W 27–0	36,400	
October 20		William & Mary^{†}	Lane Stadium; Blacksburg, VA		W 38–15	34,500	
October 27	6:00 p.m.	at Temple	Veterans Stadium; Philadelphia, PA		W 9–7	10,124	
November 3		Tulane	Lane Stadium; Blacksburg, VA		W 13–6	30,400	
November 10		at Clemson	Memorial Stadium; Clemson, SC		L 10–17	77,754	
November 17		at Vanderbilt	Vanderbilt Stadium; Nashville, TN		W 23–3	38,238	
December 15		vs. Air Force	Independence Stadium; Shreveport, LA (Independence Bowl)	ESPN, Mizlou	L 7–23	41,100	
^{†}Homecoming

== Roster ==
1984 Virginia Tech Hokies football team roster
Players
Coaches
Offense

Pos.	#	Name	Class
TE		Steve Johnson
WR		Donald Snell	So

Defense

Pos.	#	Name	Class
DE	78	Bruce Smith

Special teams

Pos.	#	Name	Class

Head coach

- Bill Dooley

Coordinators/assistant coaches

Legend

- (C) Team captain
- (S) Suspended
- (I) Ineligible
- Injured
- Redshirt

== Team players in the NFL ==
The following players were drafted in the 1985 NFL draft.

Player	Position	Round	Pick	Franchise
Bruce Smith	Defensive end	1	1	Buffalo Bills
Jesse Penn	Linebacker	2	44	Dallas Cowboys
Ashley Lee	Defensive back	8	201	Atlanta Falcons
Joe Jones	Tight end	10	270	Dallas Cowboys
Al Young	Defensive back	11	299	New York Giants

== Awards and honors ==
- Bruce Smith, Outland Trophy
- Bruce Smith, Consensus All-American
