= 1984 Memphis State Tigers football team =

American college football season

1984 Memphis State Tigers football
- Conference: Independent
- Record: 5–5-1
- Head coach: Rey Dempsey (1st season)
- Offensive coordinator: Mike Wallace (1st season)
- Defensive coordinator: Carl Angelo (1st season)
- Home stadium: Liberty Bowl Memorial Stadium

1984 NCAA Division I-A independents football records
	Conf.					Overall
Team	W		L		T	W		L		T
No. 5 Boston College		–		–		10	–	2	–	0
No. 11 South Carolina		–		–		10	–	2	–	0
Army		–		–		8	–	3	–	1
Rutgers		–		–		7	–	3	–	0
No. 17 Florida State		–		–		7	–	3	–	2
Virginia Tech		–		–		8	–	4	–	0
West Virginia		–		–		8	–	4	–	0
No. 18 Miami (FL)		–		–		8	–	5	–	0
Notre Dame		–		–		7	–	5	–	0
Temple		–		–		6	–	5	–	0
Southwestern Louisiana		–		–		6	–	5	–	0
Penn State		–		–		6	–	5	–	0
Syracuse		–		–		6	–	5	–	0
Memphis State		–		–		5	–	5	–	1
Navy		–		–		4	–	6	–	1
Southern Miss		–		–		4	–	7	–	0
Pittsburgh		–		–		3	–	7	–	1
Tulane		–		–		3	–	8	–	0
Cincinnati		–		–		2	–	9	–	0
East Carolina		–		–		2	–	9	–	0
Louisville		–		–		2	–	9	–	0
Rankings from AP Poll

The 1984 Memphis State Tigers football team represented Memphis State University (now known as the University of Memphis) in the 1984 NCAA Division I-A football season. The team was led by head coach Rey Dempsey. The Tigers played their home games at the Liberty Bowl Memorial Stadium.

== Schedule ==
Date	Opponent	Site	Result	Attendance	Source
September 1	Arkansas State	Liberty Bowl Memorial Stadium; Memphis, TN (Paint Bucket Bowl)	W 17–2	38,106	
September 8	at Ole Miss	Mississippi Veterans Memorial Stadium; Jackson, MS (rivalry)	L 6–22	41,564	
September 22	Cincinnati	Liberty Bowl Memorial Stadium; Memphis, TN	W 47–7	32,393	
September 29	at Southern Miss	M. M. Roberts Stadium; Hattiesburg, MS (Black and Blue Bowl)	W 23-13	26,831	
October 6	No. 6 Florida State	Liberty Bowl Memorial Stadium; Memphis, TN	T 17–17	27,740	
October 13	Southwestern Louisiana^{†}	Liberty Bowl Memorial Stadium; Memphis, TN	W 20–7	38,309	
October 20	Mississippi State	Liberty Bowl Memorial Stadium; Memphis, TN	W 23–12	26,997	
October 27	North Carolina	Liberty Bowl Memorial Stadium; Memphis, TN	L 27–30	37,781	
November 3	at No. 8 Georgia	Sanford Stadium; Athens, GA	L 3–13	82,122	
November 10	at Tennessee	Neyland Stadium; Knoxville, TN	L 9–41	94,930	
November 17	at Tulane	Louisiana Superdome; New Orleans, LA	L 9–14	20,109	
^{†}Homecoming; Rankings from AP Poll released prior to the game
