= 1984 Navy Midshipmen football team =

American college football season

1984 Navy Midshipmen football
- Conference: Independent
- Record: 4–6–1
- Head coach: Gary Tranquill (3rd season)
- Captains: Mark Stevens; Eric Rutherford
- Home stadium: Navy–Marine Corps Memorial Stadium

1984 NCAA Division I-A independents football records
	Conf.					Overall
Team	W		L		T	W		L		T
No. 5 Boston College		–		–		10	–	2	–	0
No. 11 South Carolina		–		–		10	–	2	–	0
Army		–		–		8	–	3	–	1
Rutgers		–		–		7	–	3	–	0
No. 17 Florida State		–		–		7	–	3	–	2
Virginia Tech		–		–		8	–	4	–	0
West Virginia		–		–		8	–	4	–	0
No. 18 Miami (FL)		–		–		8	–	5	–	0
Notre Dame		–		–		7	–	5	–	0
Temple		–		–		6	–	5	–	0
Southwestern Louisiana		–		–		6	–	5	–	0
Penn State		–		–		6	–	5	–	0
Syracuse		–		–		6	–	5	–	0
Memphis State		–		–		5	–	5	–	1
Navy		–		–		4	–	6	–	1
Southern Miss		–		–		4	–	7	–	0
Pittsburgh		–		–		3	–	7	–	1
Tulane		–		–		3	–	8	–	0
Cincinnati		–		–		2	–	9	–	0
East Carolina		–		–		2	–	9	–	0
Louisville		–		–		2	–	9	–	0
Rankings from AP Poll

The 1984 Navy Midshipmen football team represented the United States Naval Academy as an independent during the 1984 NCAA Division I-A football season.

== Schedule ==
Date	Time	Opponent	Site	TV	Result	Attendance	Source
September 15		at North Carolina	Kenan Memorial Stadium; Chapel Hill, NC		W 33–30	49,500	
September 22		Virginia	Navy–Marine Corps Memorial Stadium; Annapolis, MD		L 9–21	29,349	
September 29		at Arkansas	War Memorial Stadium; Little Rock, AR		L 10–33	54,812	
October 6		at Air Force	Falcon Stadium; Colorado Springs, CO (Commander-in-Chief's Trophy)		L 22–29	29,349	
October 13		Lehigh	Navy–Marine Corps Memorial Stadium; Annapolis, MD		W 31–14	21,547	
October 20		Princeton^{†}	Navy–Marine Corps Memorial Stadium; Annapolis, MD		W 41–3	31,039	
October 27	1:30 p.m.	at Pittsburgh	Pitt Stadium; Pittsburgh, PA		T 28–28	34,715	
November 3	12:10 p.m.	vs. Notre Dame	Giants Stadium; East Rutherford, NJ (rivalry)	ESPN	L 17–18	61,795	
November 10		at Syracuse	Carrier Dome; Syracuse, NY		L 0–29	44,090	
November 17		No. 2 South Carolina	Navy–Marine Corps Memorial Stadium; Annapolis, MD	HTS	W 38–21	27,234	
December 1		vs. Army	Veterans Stadium; Philadelphia, PA (Army–Navy Game)		L 11–28	73,180	
^{†}Homecoming; Rankings from AP Poll released prior to the game; All times are in Eastern time

== Game summaries ==
=== At North Carolina ===
Navy Midshipmen (0–0) at North Carolina Tar Heels (0–0)

Quarter	1	2	3	4	Total
Navy	3	9	7	14	33
North Carolina	7	14	0	9	30

at Kenan Memorial Stadium, Chapel Hill, North Carolina

- Date: September 15, 1984
- Game attendance: 49,500

Team	Category	Player	Statistics
Navy	Passing	Bill Byrne	13/28, 217 Yds, 3 TD, 2 INT
Navy	Rushing	Napoleon McCallum	19 Rush, 117 Yds
Navy	Receiving	Chris Weiler	4 Rec, 62 Yds, TD
North Carolina	Passing	Kevin Anthony	12/18, 197 Yds, 3 INT
North Carolina	Rushing	Eddie Colson	13 Rush, 97 Yds, 2 TD
North Carolina	Receiving	Earl Winfield	4 Rec, 88 Yds

Scoring summary

Quarter	Time	Drive			Team	Scoring information	Score	
Quarter	Time	Plays	Yards	TOP	Team	Scoring information	NAVY	UNC
1					North Carolina	Eddie Colson 3-yard touchdown run, Lee Gilarmis kick good	0	7
1					Navy	45-yard field goal by Todd Solomon	3	7
2					North Carolina	Eddie Colson 1-yard touchdown run, Lee Gilarmis kick good	3	14
2					Navy	26-yard field goal by Todd Solomon	6	14
2					North Carolina	Eric Streater 31-yard touchdown reception from Mark Maye, Lee Gilarmis kick good	6	21
2					Navy	Ken Heine 8-yard touchdown reception from Bob Misch, 2-point pass failed	12	21
3					Navy	Tony Hollinger 4-yard touchdown reception from Bill Byrne, Todd Solomon kick good	19	21
4					North Carolina	41-yard field goal by Rob Rogers	19	24
4					Navy	Chris Weiler 11-yard touchdown reception from Bill Byrne, 2-point pass failed	25	24
4					North Carolina	Ethan Horton 2-yard touchdown run, 2-point pass failed	25	30
4	2:24	2			Navy	Rich Clouse 60-yard touchdown reception from Bill Byrne, 2-point run good	33	30
"TOP" = time of possession. For other American football terms, see Glossary of American football.							33	30

=== South Carolina ===
See: 1984 South Carolina vs. Navy football game

=== vs Army ===
Army Cadets vs. Navy Midshipmen

Quarter	1	2	3	4	Total
Army	7	7	7	7	28
Navy	0	3	0	8	11

at Veterans Stadium, Philadelphia, Pennsylvania

- Date: December 1
- Game weather: Sunny
- Game attendance: 73,180

Game information

First quarter

- ARMY – Clarence Jones 6-yard run (Craig Stopa kick). Army 7–0. Drive: 16 plays, 80 yards.

Second quarter

- ARMY – Doug Black 1-yard run (Craig Stopa kick). Army 14–0. Drive: 16 plays, 71 yards.
- NAVY – Todd Solomon 40-yard field goal, 5:00. Army 14–3. Drive:

Third quarter

- ARMY – Nate Sassaman 9-yard run (Craig Stopa kick). Army 21–3. Drive:

Fourth quarter

- ARMY – Nate Sassaman 6-yard run (Craig Stopa kick). Army 28–3. Drive: 16 plays, 74 yards.
- NAVY – Chris Weiler 6-yard pass from Bob Misch (pass good), 8:07. Army 28–11. Drive:

Top passers

- ARMY – Nate Sassaman – 4/5, 32 yards, INT
- NAVY – Bob Misch – 22/39, 280 yards, TD

Top rushers

- ARMY – Doug Black – 31 rushes, 155 yards, TD
- NAVY – Rich Clouse – 12 rushes, 45 yards

Top receivers

- ARMY – Rob Dickerson – 2 receptions, 17 yards
- NAVY – Chris Weiler – 6 receptions, 54 yards, TD

== Roster ==
1984 Navy Midshipmen football team roster
Players
Coaches
Offense

Pos.	#	Name	Class
RB		Marc Alexander
RB		John Berner
QB		Bill Byrne	So
RB		Rich Clouse	Sr
OT		Rich Coombs	Sr
OT		Bill Gabel	Sr
WR		Ken Heine	Sr
RB		Don Holl
WR		Tony Hollinger
WR		Don Hughes
QB		Joe Lauletta
WR		John Lobb
G		Mark Long	Sr
G		Tom Hubbard	So
RB		Napoleon McCallum (injured)	Sr
QB		Bob Misch	So
WR		Mike Ray
G		Doug Rhodes	Sr
RB		Eric Sauerbay
C		Gregg Sears	Sr
RB		Chuck Smith
RB		Mike Smith
TE		John Sniffen
TE		Mark Stevens (C)	Sr
WR		Chris Weiler	Sr

Defense

Pos.	#	Name	Class
DB		John Carroll
LB		Jim Dwyer
DB		Marc Firlie
DL		Eric Fudge	Jr
DL		Tom Judge
DL		Matt Kirby
DL		Dirk MacFarlane
DB		Vince McBeth
DB		Tom Metzger
DB		Joe Papetti
DL		Dave Pimpo
DL		Ken Rouser
DL		Eric Rutherford (C)	Sr
LB		Greg Schildmeyer
LB		Mike Taylor
DB		Eric Wallace
DL		Ron Zaleski

Special teams

Pos.	#	Name	Class
P		Mark Colby
P		Andy Mueck
K		Scott Quinlan
K		Todd Solomon

Head coach

- Gary Tranquill

Coordinators/assistant coaches

Legend

- (C) Team captain
- (S) Suspended
- (I) Ineligible
- Injured
- Redshirt
