= Dick Anderson (American football, born 1941) =

American football player and coach

Biographical details
- Born: July 29, 1941 (age 85); Queens, New York, U.S.

Playing career

Football
- 1960–1962: Penn State

Baseball
- 1962–1963: Penn State
- Positions: Tight end, defensive end (football)

Coaching career (HC unless noted)

Football
- 1965–1969: Lafayette (assistant)
- 1970–1972: Penn (OL)
- 1973–1983: Penn State (OL)
- 1984–1989: Rutgers
- 1990–1992: Penn State (OL)
- 1993–1998: Penn State (QB)
- 1999–2011: Penn State (OG/C)

Head coaching record
- Overall: 28–33–4

Richard E. Anderson (born July 29, 1941) is an American former college football player and coach. He served as the head football coach at Rutgers University from 1984 to 1989, compiling a record of 28–33–4. His highlight victory during that span was 21–16 win over Penn State in 1988—Rutgers' first win over the Nittany Lions in 70 years. He played college football at Penn State, and served there as an assistant football coach for many years under Joe Paterno.

== Playing career ==
Anderson, a native of Queens, New York, played tight end and defensive end at Penn State for coach Rip Engle from 1960 to 1962. He played in the 1961 and 1962 Gator Bowls and also captained the Nittany Lions baseball team. Anderson earned a bachelor's degree in physical education from Penn State in 1963. He was drafted by the Oakland Raiders in the 29th round of the 1963 American Football League draft and by the Cleveland Browns in the 17th round of the NFL draft, but Anderson opted to remain at Penn State as a graduate assistant while earning his master's degree and playing for the semi-pro Newark Bears on the weekends.

== Coaching career ==
Anderson's first full-time coaching job was as an assistant at Lafayette College under future Philadelphia Eagles General Manager Harry Gamble, whom he then followed to the University of Pennsylvania in 1970. He returned to Penn State in 1973 at the invitation of head coach Joe Paterno. In his next 11 seasons as the Nittany Lions' offensive line coach, Anderson established himself as one of college football's best. Five of his players were named All-Americans: John Nessel, Tom Rafferty, Keith Dorney, Bill Dugan, and Sean Farrell; and a steady stream of Nittany Lion linemen went on to the NFL, including Pro Football Hall of Famer Mike Munchak.

In 1984, he accepted the head coaching job at Rutgers where his six-year on-field record was 27–34–4. His best season was 1984, when the Scarlet Knights finished 7–3. Anderson was relieved of his duties at Rutgers in 1990 and returned to Penn State to resume duties as the team's offensive line coach. In 1993 Anderson moved to quarterbacks coach, following Jim Caldwell's departure to accept the head coaching job at Wake Forest. He returned to coaching the offensive line when Jay Paterno became coach of quarterbacks in 1999. Anderson was not retained after the arrival of new coach Bill O'Brien.

=== Relationship with Jerry Sandusky ===
Anderson maintains a close personal relationship with former Penn State defensive coordinator Jerry Sandusky. He testified at Sandusky's child sex abuse trial that it was not uncommon for assistant coaches and minors to be in the showers at the same time at the Lasch Football Complex.

== Head coaching record ==
Year	Team	Overall	Conference	Standing	Bowl/playoffs
Rutgers Scarlet Knights (NCAA Division I-A independent) (1984–1989)
1984	Rutgers	7–3			
1985	Rutgers	2–8–1			
1986	Rutgers	6–4–1			
1987	Rutgers	6–5			
1988	Rutgers	5–6			
1989	Rutgers	2–7–2			
Rutgers:		28–33–4			
Total:		28–33–4			
