= 1984 Cincinnati Bearcats football team =

American college football season

1984 Cincinnati Bearcats football
- Conference: Independent
- Record: 2–9
- Head coach: Dave Currey (1st season)
- Defensive coordinator: Robin Ross (1st season)
- Captains: Troy Bodine; Tom Egenoff
- Home stadium: Riverfront Stadium, Nippert Stadium

1984 NCAA Division I-A independents football records
	Conf.					Overall
Team	W		L		T	W		L		T
No. 5 Boston College		–		–		10	–	2	–	0
No. 11 South Carolina		–		–		10	–	2	–	0
Army		–		–		8	–	3	–	1
Rutgers		–		–		7	–	3	–	0
No. 17 Florida State		–		–		7	–	3	–	2
Virginia Tech		–		–		8	–	4	–	0
West Virginia		–		–		8	–	4	–	0
No. 18 Miami (FL)		–		–		8	–	5	–	0
Notre Dame		–		–		7	–	5	–	0
Temple		–		–		6	–	5	–	0
Southwestern Louisiana		–		–		6	–	5	–	0
Penn State		–		–		6	–	5	–	0
Syracuse		–		–		6	–	5	–	0
Memphis State		–		–		5	–	5	–	1
Navy		–		–		4	–	6	–	1
Southern Miss		–		–		4	–	7	–	0
Pittsburgh		–		–		3	–	7	–	1
Tulane		–		–		3	–	8	–	0
Cincinnati		–		–		2	–	9	–	0
East Carolina		–		–		2	–	9	–	0
Louisville		–		–		2	–	9	–	0
Rankings from AP Poll

The 1984 Cincinnati Bearcats football team represented the University of Cincinnati during the 1984 NCAA Division I-A football season. The Bearcats, led by first-year head coach Dave Currey, participated as independent and played their home games at Riverfront Stadium. On-campus Nippert Stadium was used as a supplement.

== Schedule ==
Date	Opponent	Site	Result	Attendance	Source
September 8	Akron	Nippert Stadium; Cincinnati, OH	W 28–27		
September 15	Youngstown State	Nippert Stadium; Cincinnati, OH	L 23–27		
September 22	at Memphis State	Liberty Bowl Memorial Stadium; Memphis, TN (rivalry)	L 7–47	32,393	
September 29	at Rutgers	Rutgers Stadium; Piscataway, NJ	L 15–43	18,657	
October 13	No. 10 Miami (FL)	Riverfront Stadium; Cincinnati, OH	L 25–49	25,642	
October 20	at No. 17 Florida	Florida Field; Gainesville, FL	L 17–48	73,690	
October 27	Louisville	Riverfront Stadium; Cincinnati, OH (rivalry)	W 40–21	15,767	
November 3	at Temple	Veterans Stadium; Philadelphia, PA	L 10–42	6,529	
November 10	at No. 20 Auburn	Jordan-Hare Stadium; Auburn, AL	L 0–60	74,750	
November 17	Alabama	Riverfront Stadium; Cincinnati, OH	L 7–29	27,482	
November 22	Miami (OH)	Riverfront Stadium; Cincinnati, OH (Victory Bell)	L 26–31	15,211	
Rankings from AP Poll released prior to the game
