= 1984 Southern Miss Golden Eagles football team =

American college football season

1984 Southern Miss Golden Eagles football
- Conference: Independent
- Record: 4–7
- Head coach: Jim Carmody (3rd season)
- Offensive coordinator: Keith Daniels (3rd season)
- Home stadium: M. M. Roberts Stadium

1984 NCAA Division I-A independents football records
	Conf.					Overall
Team	W		L		T	W		L		T
No. 5 Boston College		–		–		10	–	2	–	0
No. 11 South Carolina		–		–		10	–	2	–	0
Army		–		–		8	–	3	–	1
Rutgers		–		–		7	–	3	–	0
No. 17 Florida State		–		–		7	–	3	–	2
Virginia Tech		–		–		8	–	4	–	0
West Virginia		–		–		8	–	4	–	0
No. 18 Miami (FL)		–		–		8	–	5	–	0
Notre Dame		–		–		7	–	5	–	0
Temple		–		–		6	–	5	–	0
Southwestern Louisiana		–		–		6	–	5	–	0
Penn State		–		–		6	–	5	–	0
Syracuse		–		–		6	–	5	–	0
Memphis State		–		–		5	–	5	–	1
Navy		–		–		4	–	6	–	1
Southern Miss		–		–		4	–	7	–	0
Pittsburgh		–		–		3	–	7	–	1
Tulane		–		–		3	–	8	–	0
Cincinnati		–		–		2	–	9	–	0
East Carolina		–		–		2	–	9	–	0
Louisville		–		–		2	–	9	–	0
Rankings from AP Poll

The 1984 Southern Miss Golden Eagles football team was an American football team that represented the University of Southern Mississippi as an independent during the 1984 NCAA Division I-A football season. In their third year under head coach Jim Carmody, the team compiled a 4–7 record.

== Schedule ==
Date	Opponent	Site	Result	Attendance	Source
September 8	at Georgia	Sanford Stadium; Athens, GA	L 19–26	81,421	
September 15	Louisiana Tech	M. M. Roberts Stadium; Hattiesburg, MS (rivalry)	W 34–0	28,842	
September 22	at No. 19 Auburn	Jordan–Hare Stadium; Auburn, AL	L 12–35	74,841	
September 29	Memphis State	M. M. Roberts Stadium; Hattiesburg, MS (rivalry)	L 13–23	26,831	
October 6	vs. Mississippi State	Mississippi Veterans Memorial Stadium; Jackson, MS	L 18–27	50,136	
October 13	at Tulane	Louisiana Superdome; New Orleans, LA (rivalry)	L 7–35	30,764	
October 20	vs. Ole Miss	Mississippi Veterans Memorial Stadium; Jackson, MS	W 13–10	57,000	
October 27	at Southwestern Louisiana	Cajun Field; Lafayette, LA	L 7–13	19,605	
November 3	Northwestern State^{†}	M. M. Roberts Stadium; Hattiesburg, MS	L 0–22	24,682	
November 10	at East Carolina	Ficklen Memorial Stadium; Greenville, NC	W 31–27	21,237	
November 17	Louisville	M. M. Roberts Stadium; Hattiesburg, MS	W 34–27	15,904	
^{†}Homecoming; Rankings from AP Poll released prior to the game
