= 1984 Louisville Cardinals football team =

American college football season

1984 Louisville Cardinals football
- Conference: Independent
- Record: 2–9
- Head coach: Bob Weber (5th season)
- Home stadium: Cardinal Stadium

1984 NCAA Division I-A independents football records
	Conf.					Overall
Team	W		L		T	W		L		T
No. 5 Boston College		–		–		10	–	2	–	0
No. 11 South Carolina		–		–		10	–	2	–	0
Army		–		–		8	–	3	–	1
Rutgers		–		–		7	–	3	–	0
No. 17 Florida State		–		–		7	–	3	–	2
Virginia Tech		–		–		8	–	4	–	0
West Virginia		–		–		8	–	4	–	0
No. 18 Miami (FL)		–		–		8	–	5	–	0
Notre Dame		–		–		7	–	5	–	0
Temple		–		–		6	–	5	–	0
Southwestern Louisiana		–		–		6	–	5	–	0
Penn State		–		–		6	–	5	–	0
Syracuse		–		–		6	–	5	–	0
Memphis State		–		–		5	–	5	–	1
Navy		–		–		4	–	6	–	1
Southern Miss		–		–		4	–	7	–	0
Pittsburgh		–		–		3	–	7	–	1
Tulane		–		–		3	–	8	–	0
Cincinnati		–		–		2	–	9	–	0
East Carolina		–		–		2	–	9	–	0
Louisville		–		–		2	–	9	–	0
Rankings from AP Poll

The 1984 Louisville Cardinals football team represented the University of Louisville in the 1984 NCAA Division I-A football season. The Cardinals, led by fifth-year head coach Bob Weber, participated as independents and played their home games at Cardinal Stadium.

== Schedule ==
Date	Opponent	Site	Result	Attendance	Source
September 1	Murray State	Cardinal Stadium; Louisville, KY	L 23–26	24,557	
September 8	at West Virginia	Mountaineer Field; Morgantown, WV	L 6–30	55,002	
September 15	No. 14 SMU	Cardinal Stadium; Louisville, KY	L 7–41	26,859	
September 29	at Houston	Houston Astrodome; Houston, TX	W 30–28	22,533	
October 6	Western Kentucky	Cardinal Stadium; Louisville, KY	W 45–17	24,468	
October 13	No. 1 (I-AA) Indiana State^{†}	Cardinal Stadium; Louisville, KY	L 21–44	25,051	
October 20	at Rutgers	Rutgers Stadium; Piscataway, NJ	L 21–38	25,764	
October 27	at Cincinnati	Riverfront Stadium; Cincinnati, OH (Keg of Nails)	L 21–40	15,767	
November 3	No. 6 Miami (FL)	Cardinal Stadium; Louisville, KY (rivalry)	L 23–38	20,113	
November 10	Tennessee State	Cardinal Stadium; Louisville, KY	L 15–24	23,821	
November 17	Southern Miss	M. M. Roberts Stadium; Hattiesburg, MS	L 25–34	15,904	
^{†}Homecoming; Rankings from AP Poll released prior to the game
