= 1984 Miami Hurricanes football team =

American college football season

1984 Miami Hurricanes football

Fiesta Bowl, L 37–39 vs. UCLA
- Conference: Independent

Ranking
- AP: No. 18
- Record: 8–5
- Head coach: Jimmy Johnson (1st season)
- Offensive coordinator: Gary Stevens (2nd season)
- Offensive scheme: Pro-style
- Defensive coordinator: Bill Trout (1st season)
- Base defense: 5–2
- MVP: Bernie Kosar
- Home stadium: Miami Orange Bowl

1984 NCAA Division I-A independents football records
	Conf.					Overall
Team	W		L		T	W		L		T
No. 5 Boston College		–		–		10	–	2	–	0
No. 11 South Carolina		–		–		10	–	2	–	0
Army		–		–		8	–	3	–	1
Rutgers		–		–		7	–	3	–	0
No. 17 Florida State		–		–		7	–	3	–	2
Virginia Tech		–		–		8	–	4	–	0
West Virginia		–		–		8	–	4	–	0
No. 18 Miami (FL)		–		–		8	–	5	–	0
Notre Dame		–		–		7	–	5	–	0
Temple		–		–		6	–	5	–	0
Southwestern Louisiana		–		–		6	–	5	–	0
Penn State		–		–		6	–	5	–	0
Syracuse		–		–		6	–	5	–	0
Memphis State		–		–		5	–	5	–	1
Navy		–		–		4	–	6	–	1
Southern Miss		–		–		4	–	7	–	0
Pittsburgh		–		–		3	–	7	–	1
Tulane		–		–		3	–	8	–	0
Cincinnati		–		–		2	–	9	–	0
East Carolina		–		–		2	–	9	–	0
Louisville		–		–		2	–	9	–	0
Rankings from AP Poll

The 1984 Miami Hurricanes football team represented the University of Miami as an independent during the 1984 NCAA Division I-A football season. It was the Hurricanes' 59th season of football. The Hurricanes were led by first-year head coach Jimmy Johnson and played their home games at the Orange Bowl. They finished the season 8–5 overall. They were invited to the Fiesta Bowl where they lost to UCLA, 39–37.

The Hurricanes were the defending national champions from the 1983 college football season. Having defeated number one ranked Auburn, and then Florida, they rose to be ranked number one before their game at Michigan. They remained in the top ten after that loss. They lost again to Florida State. They beat a ranked Notre Dame team in South Bend to return to the top 10. The Hurricanes earned three more wins, but then suffered two of the most notable losses in college football history.

On November 10, at the Miami Orange Bowl, Maryland defeated the Hurricanes with the largest comeback in college football history. Down 31–0 at halftime, Frank Reich, who had been injured, came off the bench and led the comeback. At the start of the third quarter, Reich led the Terrapins on multiple scoring drives. Three touchdowns in the third quarter and a fourth at the start of the final quarter turned what was a blowout into a close game. Maryland completed a 42–9 second half, and won 42–40.

Two weeks later at the Orange Bowl stadium, the Hurricanes faced the Boston College Eagles in a nationally televised game that has become known as "Hail Flutie". It has been regarded by FOX Sports writer Kevin Hench as among the most memorable moments in sports. The game is most notable for a last-second Hail Mary pass from quarterback Doug Flutie to wide receiver Gerard Phelan to give Boston College the win.

== Schedule ==
Date	Time	Opponent	Rank	Site	TV	Result	Attendance	Source
August 27	9:00 pm	vs. No. 1 Auburn	No. 10	Giants Stadium; East Rutherford, NJ (Kickoff Classic)	KATZ	W 20–18	51,131	
September 1	7:30 pm	vs. No. 17 Florida	No. 10	Tampa Stadium; Tampa, FL (rivalry)	ESPN	W 32–20	72,813	
September 8	1:00 pm	at No. 14 Michigan	No. 1	Michigan Stadium; Ann Arbor, MI	KATZ	L 14–22	105,403	
September 15	2:30 pm	at Purdue	No. 5	Ross–Ade Stadium; West Lafayette, IN		W 28–17	56,716	
September 22	3:30 pm	No. 15 Florida State	No. 4	Miami Orange Bowl; Miami, FL (rivalry)	CBS	L 3–38	60,210	
September 29	7:00 pm	Rice	No. 16	Miami Orange Bowl; Miami, FL		W 38–3	20,084	
October 6	7:30 pm	at No. 16 Notre Dame	No. 14	Notre Dame Stadium; Notre Dame, IN (rivalry)	ESPN	W 31–13	59,075	
October 13		at Cincinnati	No. 10	Riverfront Stadium; Cincinnati, OH	KATZ	W 49–25	25,642	
October 20	12:00 pm	Pittsburgh^{†}	No. 9	Miami Orange Bowl; Miami, FL	USA	W 27–7	32,872	
November 3	12:30 pm	at Louisville	No. 6	Cardinal Stadium; Louisville, KY (rivalry)		W 38–23	20,113	
November 10	12:00 pm	Maryland	No. 6	Miami Orange Bowl; Miami, FL	JP	L 40–42	31,548	
November 23	2:30 pm	No. 10 Boston College	No. 12	Miami Orange Bowl; Miami, FL	CBS	L 45–47	30,325	
January 1	1:30 pm	vs. No. 14 UCLA	No. 13	Sun Devil Stadium; Tempe, AZ (Fiesta Bowl)	NBC	L 37–39	60,310	
^{†}Homecoming; Rankings from AP Poll released prior to the game; All times are in Eastern time

== Game summaries ==
=== Auburn ===
#1 Auburn vs. #10 Miami (FL)

Team	1	2	3	4	Total
Tigers	0	12	3	3	18
• Hurricanes	7	7	0	6	20

- Date: August 27
- Location: Giants Stadium
- Game attendance: 51,131
- TV announcers (KATZ): Curt Gowdy and Len Dawson

Scoring summary
Q1	10:19	MIA	Shakespeare 17 yard pass from Kosar (Cox kick)	MIA 7–0
Q2		AUB	Beauford 31 yard pass from Washington (McGinty kick)	Tie 7–7
Q2		MIA	Shakespeare 8 yard pass from Kosar (Cox kick)	MIA 14–7
Q2		AUB	McGinty 42 yard field goal	MIA 14–10
Q2	0:56	AUB	Safety, Tuten tackled in end zone by Powell	MIA 14–12
Q3		AUB	McGinty 36 yard field goal	AUB 15–14
Q4	14:09	MIA	Cox 45 yard field goal	MIA 17–15
Q4	10:17	AUB	McGinty 45 yard field goal	AUB 18–17
Q4	6:08	MIA	Cox 25 yard field goal	MIA 20–18

- Bernie Kosar 21/38, 329 Yds, 2 TD
- Alonzo Highsmith 21 Rush, 140 Yds
- Eddie Brown 8, Rec 157 Yds

=== Florida ===
#10 Miami (FL) vs. #17 Florida

Team	1	2	3	4	Total
• Hurricanes	3	13	3	13	32
Gators	3	7	3	7	20

- Date: September 1
- Location: Tampa Stadium, Tampa, FL
- Television network: ESPN

Scoring summary
Q1		MIA	Cox 29 yard field goal	MIA 3–0
Q1		FLA	Raymond 44 yard field goal	Tie 3–3
Q2		FLA	Hampton 64 yard run (Raymond kick)	FLA 10–3
Q2		MIA	Cox 20 yard field goal	FLA 10–6
Q2		MIA	Oliver 21 yard run (Cox kick)	MIA 13–10
Q2		MIA	Cox 27 yard field goal	MIA 16–10
Q3		MIA	Cox 25 yard field goal	MIA 19–10
Q3		FLA	Raymond 30 yard field goal	MIA 19–13
Q4	:41	FLA	Neal 5 yard pass from Bell (Raymond kick)	FLA 20–19
Q4	:07	MIA	Brown 12 yard pass from Kosar (Cox kick)	MIA 26–20
Q4	:00	MIA	Bain 59 yard interception return	MIA 32–20

- Bernie Kosar 25/33, 300 Yds
- Willie Smith 11 Rec, 152 Yds

=== Michigan ===
#1 Miami (FL) at #14 Michigan

Team	1	2	3	4	Total
Hurricanes	0	0	7	7	14
• Wolverines	6	0	6	10	22

- Date: September 8
- Location: Michigan Stadium
- Game attendance: 105,403

Scoring summary
Q1	MICH	Perryman 6 yard run (kick failed)	MICH 6–0
Q3	MIA	E. Brown 32 yard pass from Kosar (Cox kick)	MIA 7–6
Q3	MICH	Perryman 3 yard run (run failed)	MICH 12–7
Q4	MICH	Perryman 1 yard run (Bergeron kick)	MICH 19–7
Q4	MIA	Shakespeare 44 yard pass from Kosar (Cox kick)	MICH 19–14
Q4	MICH	Bergeron 27 yard field goal	MICH 22–14

=== Purdue ===
#5 Miami (FL) at Purdue

Team	1	2	3	4	Total
• Hurricanes	7	7	14	0	28
Boilermakers	10	7	0	0	17

- Date: September 14
- Location: Ross–Ade Stadium

Scoring summary
Q1	MIA	Highsmith 47 yard run (Cox kick)	MIA 7–0
Q1	PUR	Rendina 32 yard field goal	MIA 7–3
Q1	PUR	Wallace 4 yard run (Rendina kick)	PUR 10–3
Q2	MIA	Oliver 2 yard run (Cox kick)	Tie 10–10
Q2	PUR	Wallace 2 yard run (Rendina kick)	PUR 13–10
Q3	MIA	Kosar 1 yard run (Cox kick)	MIA 17–13
Q3	MIA	Highsmith 6 yard run (Cox kick)	MIA 24–13

=== Notre Dame ===
#14 Miami (FL) at #16 Notre Dame

Team	1	2	3	4	Total
• Hurricanes	0	7	14	10	31
Fighting Irish	0	10	3	0	13

- Date: October 6
- Location: Notre Dame Stadium
- Game attendance: 59,075

Scoring summary
Q2	MIA	Highsmith 3 yard pass from Kosar (Seelig kick)	MIA 7–0
Q2	ND	Safety, Tuten ran out of end zone	MIA 7–2
Q2	ND	Jackson 4 yard pass from Beuerlein (Jefferson run)	ND 10–7
Q3	ND	Carney 39 yard field goal	ND 13–7
Q3	MIA	Highsmith 1 yard run (Seelig kick)	MIA 14–13
Q3	MIA	Highsmith 2 yard run (Seelig kick)	MIA 21–13
Q4	MIA	Seelig 27 yard field goal	MIA 24–13
Q4	MIA	Highsmith 1 yard pass from Kosar (Seelig kick)	MIA 31–13

=== Louisville ===
#6 Miami (FL) at Louisville

Team	1	2	3	4	Total
• Hurricanes	0	24	7	7	38
Cardinals	0	3	7	13	23

- Date: November 3
- Location: Cardinal Stadium
- Game attendance: 20,113

Scoring summary
Q2	MIA	Highsmith 8 yard run (Cox kick)	MIA 7–0
Q2	MIA	Brown 32 yard pass from Kosar (Cox kick)	MIA 14–0
Q2	LOU	Ellis 33 yard field goal	MIA 14–3
Q2	MIA	Kosar 1 yard run (Cox kick)	MIA 21–3
Q2	MIA	Cox 37 yard field goal	MIA 24–3
Q3	LOU	Davenport 4 yard run (Ellis kick)	MIA 24–10
Q3	MIA	Brown 10 yard pass from Kosar (Cox kick)	MIA 31–10
Q4	MIA	Bratton 59 yard pass from Kosar (Cox kick)	MIA 38–10
Q4	LOU	Gray 6 yard pass from Rubbert (Ellis kick)	MIA 38–17
Q4	LOU	Knighton 2 yard run (pass failed)	MIA 38–23

- Kosar 22/36, 330 Yds
- Highsmith 18 Rush, 100 Yds
- Smith 10 Rec, 124 Yds
- Brown 5 Rec, 113 Yds

=== Maryland ===
Maryland at #6 Miami (FL)

Team	1	2	3	4	Total
• Terrapins	0	0	21	21	42
Hurricanes	7	24	3	6	40

- Date: November 16
- Location: Orange Bowl
- Game attendance: 31,548
- Game weather: 80 °F (27 °C), Partly sunny, Wind NE 9 mph (14 km/h)
- TV announcers (JP): Mike Patrick, Kevin Kiley, and Chris Clackum

Scoring summary
Q1	3:51	MIA	Bernie Kosar 1-yard run (Cox kick)	MIA 7–0
Q2		MIA	Willie Smith 7-yard pass from Bernie Kosar (Cox kick)	MIA 14–0
Q2		MIA	Willie Smith 11-yard pass from Bernie Kosar (Cox kick)	MIA 21–0
Q2	1:03	MIA	Greg Cox 48-yard field goal	MIA 24–0
Q2	0:12	MIA	Charles Henry 1-yard pass from Bernie Kosar (Cox kick)	MIA 31–0
Q3	12:35	MD	Greg Hill 39-yard pass from Frank Reich (Atkinson kick)	MIA 31–7
Q3	6:53	MD	Frank Reich 1-yard run (Atkinson kick)	MIA 31–14
Q3	5:08	MIA	Greg Cox 19-yard field goal	MIA 34–14
Q3		MD	Alvin Blount 1-yard pass from Frank Reich (Atkinson kick)	MIA 34–21
Q4	9:20	MD	Tommy Neal 20-yard run (Atkinson kick)	MIA 34–28
Q4	5:29	MD	Greg Hill 68-yard pass from Frank Reich (Atkinson kick)	MD 35–34
Q4	9:20	MD	Rick Badanjek 4-yard run (Atkinson kick)	MD 42–34
Q2	1:00	MIA	Eddie Brown 5-yard pass from Bernie Kosar (pass failed)	MD 42–40

=== Boston College ===
#10 Boston College at #12 Miami (FL)

Team	1	2	3	4	Total
• Eagles	14	14	3	16	47
Hurricanes	7	14	10	14	45

- Date: November 23
- Location: Orange Bowl
- TV announcers (CBS): Brent Musburger, Ara Parseghian, and Pat Haden

=== UCLA (Fiesta Bowl) ===
#14 UCLA vs. #13 Miami (FL)

Team	1	2	3	4	Total
• Bruins	7	15	7	10	39
Hurricanes	14	7	3	13	37

- Date: January 1
- Location: Sun Devil Stadium
- Game attendance: 60,310
- TV announcers (NBC): Charlie Jones and Bob Griese

== Roster ==
Player	Class	Pos	Summary
Bernie Kosar*		QB	262 Cmp, 416 Att, 3642 Yds, 25 TD
Vinny Testaverde		QB	17 Cmp, 34 Att, 184 Yds, 0 TD
Alonzo Highsmith*		RB	146 Att, 906 Yds, 6.2 Avg
Darryl Oliver*		RB	92 Att, 407 Yds, 4.4 Avg
Melvin Bratton		RB	49 Att, 279 Yds, 5.7 Avg
Warren Williams		RB	29 Att, 140 Yds, 4.8 Avg
Steve Staffier		RB	9 Att, 48 Yds, 5.3 Avg
Todd Stanish		RB	9 Att, 28 Yds, 3.1 Avg
Eric Ham		RB	8 Att, 11 Yds, 1.4 Avg
Eddie Brown*		WR	59 Rec, 1114 Yds, 18.9 Avg
Stanley Shakespeare*		WR	38 Rec, 621 Yds, 16.3 Avg
David Kintigh		WR	4 Rec, 62 Yds, 15.5 Avg
Brian Blades		WR	3 Rec, 50 Yds, 16.7 Avg
Kenny Oliver		WR	1 Rec, 17 Yds, 17.0 Avg
Willie Smith*		TE	66 Rec, 852 Yds, 12.9 Avg
Alfredo Roberts		TE	5 Rec, 50 Yds, 10.0 Avg
Charles Henry		TE	1 Rec, 1 Yds, 1.0 Avg
Paul Bertucelli*		OL	
Juan Comendeiro*		OL	
Dave Heffernan*		OL	
Ian Sinclair*		OL	
Alvin Ward*		OL	
Mike Moore		OL	
Willie Lee Broughton*		DL	
Dallas Cameron*		DL	
Julio Cortes*		DL	
Kevin Fagan*		DL	
Joe Kohlbrand*		DL	
Paul O'Connor		DL	
John McVeigh*		LB	
Winston Moss*		LB	
Bruce Fleming		LB	
Ken Calhoun*		DB	
Darrell Fullington*		DB	
Greg Jones*		DB	
Willie Martinez*		DB	
Lucious Delegal		DB	
Reggie Sutton		DB	
Rick Tuten		P	
Steve Minie		P	
J.C. Penny		KR	

Other: LB #45 George Mira Jr. (FR)
