= 1984 East Carolina Pirates football team =

American college football season

1984 East Carolina Pirates football
- Conference: Independent
- Record: 2–9
- Head coach: Ed Emory (5th season)
- Defensive coordinator: Tom Throckmorton (2nd season)
- Home stadium: Ficklen Memorial Stadium

1984 NCAA Division I-A independents football records
| | Conf. | | | | | Overall |
| Team | W | | L | | T | W | | L | | T |
|---|---|---|---|---|---|---|---|---|---|---|
| No. 5 Boston College | | – | | – | | 10 | – | 2 | – | 0 |
| No. 11 South Carolina | | – | | – | | 10 | – | 2 | – | 0 |
| Army | | – | | – | | 8 | – | 3 | – | 1 |
| Rutgers | | – | | – | | 7 | – | 3 | – | 0 |
| No. 17 Florida State | | – | | – | | 7 | – | 3 | – | 2 |
| Virginia Tech | | – | | – | | 8 | – | 4 | – | 0 |
| West Virginia | | – | | – | | 8 | – | 4 | – | 0 |
| No. 18 Miami (FL) | | – | | – | | 8 | – | 5 | – | 0 |
| Notre Dame | | – | | – | | 7 | – | 5 | – | 0 |
| Temple | | – | | – | | 6 | – | 5 | – | 0 |
| Southwestern Louisiana | | – | | – | | 6 | – | 5 | – | 0 |
| Penn State | | – | | – | | 6 | – | 5 | – | 0 |
| Syracuse | | – | | – | | 6 | – | 5 | – | 0 |
| Memphis State | | – | | – | | 5 | – | 5 | – | 1 |
| Navy | | – | | – | | 4 | – | 6 | – | 1 |
| Southern Miss | | – | | – | | 4 | – | 7 | – | 0 |
| Pittsburgh | | – | | – | | 3 | – | 7 | – | 1 |
| Tulane | | – | | – | | 3 | – | 8 | – | 0 |
| Cincinnati | | – | | – | | 2 | – | 9 | – | 0 |
| East Carolina | | – | | – | | 2 | – | 9 | – | 0 |
| Louisville | | – | | – | | 2 | – | 9 | – | 0 |
Rankings from AP Poll

The 1984 East Carolina Pirates football team was an American football team that represented East Carolina University as an independent during the 1984 NCAA Division I-A football season. In their fifth season under head coach Ed Emory, the team compiled a 2–9 record.

== Schedule ==
| Date | Opponent | Site | TV | Result | Attendance | Source |
|---|---|---|---|---|---|---|
| September 1 | at No. 20 Florida State | Doak Campbell Stadium; Tallahassee, FL | WITN | L 17–48 | 54,211 | |
| September 8 | Temple | Ficklen Memorial Stadium; Greenville, NC | | L 0–17 | 31,479 | |
| September 15 | at Central Michigan | Kelly/Shorts Stadium; Mount Pleasant, MI | | L 12–17 | 23,249 | |
| September 22 | Georgia Southern | Ficklen Memorial Stadium; Greenville, NC | | W 34–27 | 25,137 | |
| September 29 | at NC State | Carter–Finley Stadium; Raleigh, NC (rivalry) | | L 22–31 | 57,300 | |
| October 6 | at Pittsburgh | Pitt Stadium; Pittsburgh, PA | KATZ | L 10–17 | 26,475 | |
| October 13 | at Tulsa | Skelly Stadium; Tulsa, OK | | L 20–31 | 16,674 | |
| October 20 | East Tennessee State | Ficklen Memorial Stadium; Greenville, NC | | W 24–6 | 27,119 | |
| October 27 | at No. 9 South Carolina | Williams–Brice Stadium; Columbia, SC | | L 20–42 | 73,800 | |
| November 3 | at Southwestern Louisiana | Cajun Field; Lafayette, LA | | L 24–42 | 23,357 | |
| November 10 | Southern Miss | Ficklen Memorial Stadium; Greenville, NC | | L 27–31 | 21,237 | |
Rankings from AP Poll released prior to the game
