= 1984 Tulane Green Wave football team =

American college football season

1984 Tulane Green Wave football
- Conference: Independent
- Record: 3–8
- Head coach: Wally English (2nd season)
- Home stadium: Louisiana Superdome

1984 NCAA Division I-A independents football records
	Conf.					Overall
Team	W		L		T	W		L		T
No. 5 Boston College		–		–		10	–	2	–	0
No. 11 South Carolina		–		–		10	–	2	–	0
Army		–		–		8	–	3	–	1
Rutgers		–		–		7	–	3	–	0
No. 17 Florida State		–		–		7	–	3	–	2
Virginia Tech		–		–		8	–	4	–	0
West Virginia		–		–		8	–	4	–	0
No. 18 Miami (FL)		–		–		8	–	5	–	0
Notre Dame		–		–		7	–	5	–	0
Temple		–		–		6	–	5	–	0
Southwestern Louisiana		–		–		6	–	5	–	0
Penn State		–		–		6	–	5	–	0
Syracuse		–		–		6	–	5	–	0
Memphis State		–		–		5	–	5	–	1
Navy		–		–		4	–	6	–	1
Southern Miss		–		–		4	–	7	–	0
Pittsburgh		–		–		3	–	7	–	1
Tulane		–		–		3	–	8	–	0
Cincinnati		–		–		2	–	9	–	0
East Carolina		–		–		2	–	9	–	0
Louisville		–		–		2	–	9	–	0
Rankings from AP Poll

The 1984 Tulane Green Wave football team was an American football team that represented Tulane University during the 1984 NCAA Division I-A football season as an independent. In their second year under head coach Wally English, the team compiled a 3–8 record.

English was fired after the season finale vs. LSU. Mack Brown, then the offensive coordinator at Oklahoma and previously an assistant at LSU, was hired as English's replacement.

== Schedule ==
Date	Opponent	Site	TV	Result	Attendance	Source
September 1	Mississippi State	Louisiana Superdome; New Orleans, LA		L 3–30	38,695	
September 15	at Florida	Florida Field; Gainesville, FL		L 21–63	65,265	
September 22	Kentucky	Louisiana Superdome; New Orleans, LA		L 26–30	16,505	
September 29	at Ole Miss	Vaught–Hemingway Stadium; Oxford, MS (rivalry)		L 14–19	33,866	
October 6	at No. 19 Vanderbilt	Vanderbilt Stadium; Nashville, TN		W 27–23	41,216	
October 13	Southern Miss	Louisiana Superdome; New Orleans, LA (rivalry)		W 35–7	30,734	
October 20	at No. 15 Florida State	Doak Campbell Stadium; Tallahassee, FL		L 6–27	54,785	
November 3	at Virginia Tech	Lane Stadium; Blacksburg, VA		L 6–13	30,400	
November 10	at Pittsburgh	Pitt Stadium; Pittsburgh, PA		L 10–21	20,159	
November 17	Memphis State	Louisiana Superdome; New Orleans, LA		W 14–9	20,109	
November 24	at No. 16 LSU	Tiger Stadium; Baton Rouge, LA (Battle for the Rag)	TigerVision	L 15–33	77,983	
Rankings from AP Poll released prior to the game
