= Joe Moore (American football coach) =

American football coach (1932–2003)

Biographical details
- Born: February 19, 1932; Pittsburgh, Pennsylvania, U.S.
- Died: July 3, 2003 (aged 71); Pittsburgh, Pennsylvania, U.S.
- Education: Pennsylvania State University

Coaching career (HC unless noted)
- 1963–1971: McDowell HS (PA)
- 1972–1976: Upper St. Clair HS (PA)
- 1977−1979: Pittsburgh (RB)
- 1980: Pittsburgh (OL)
- 1981: Pittsburgh (OC/OL)
- 1982: Pittsburgh (AHC/OL)
- 1983–1984: Pittsburgh (AHC/OC/OL)
- 1985: Pittsburgh (OL)
- 1986–1987: Temple (OL)
- 1988–1996: Notre Dame (OL)

Head coaching record
- Overall: 119–32–4

Joe Moore (February 19, 1932 − July 3, 2003) was an American football coach. He coached at Pitt from 1977 to 1985, developing All-Americans and Hall of Fame linemen Bill Fralic, Mark May, Russ Grimm and Jimbo Covert before moving on to coach at Temple from 1986 to 1987 and Notre Dame from 1988 to 1996. Moore stayed nine seasons in South Bend, sending all but two of his starting offensive linemen to the NFL, including Aaron Taylor, Andy Heck and Tim Ruddy. He earned a reputation as one of the best line coaches in college football history.

Moore was the namesake of the Joe Moore Award, awarded annually to the best collegiate football offensive line unit.

In 1996 Moore was fired by Notre Dame head coach Bob Davie. Moore contended that it was illegal for Davie to use age as a reason for firing him and a jury agreed, awarding Moore $150,000 in pay and almost $400,000 in legal fees in 1998.

Prior to joining the Pitt staff in 1977, Moore was head coach at Upper St. Clair High School in suburban Pittsburgh. From 1972-1975 Moore's Upper St. Clair teams were a combined 32-6-2. In 1974 and 1975 Upper St. Clair finished as WPIAL co-champions, tying Gateway High School 6-6 in 1974 and Newcastle High School 0-0 in 1975. The defensive captain of Moore's first Upper St. Clair team in 1972 was Kirk Ferentz, who is currently the head football coach at the University of Iowa.
