= Mark MacDonald (American football) =

American football player (born 1961)

No. 71, 76
- Position: Guard

Personal information
- Born: April 30, 1961 (age 65); West Roxbury, Massachusetts, U.S.
- Listed height: 6 ft 4 in (1.93 m)
- Listed weight: 267 lb (121 kg)

Career information
- High school: Catholic Memorial
- College: Boston College (1981–1984)
- NFL draft: 1985: 5th round, 115th overall pick

Career history
- Minnesota Vikings (1985–1988); Phoenix Cardinals (1988)
- Stats at Pro Football Reference

Mark Goodwin MacDonald (born April 30, 1961) is an American former professional football guard who played for the Minnesota Vikings and Phoenix Cardinals of the National Football League (NFL). He played college football at Boston College.
