= Tony Mumford =

American football player (born 1963)

No. 34
- Position: Running back

Personal information
- Born: June 14, 1963 (age 63); Philadelphia, Pennsylvania, U.S.
- Listed height: 6 ft 0 in (1.83 m)
- Listed weight: 215 lb (98 kg)

Career information
- High school: Overbrook (Philadelphia)
- College: Penn State
- NFL draft: 1985: 12th round, 328th overall pick

Career history
- New England Patriots (1985)*; St. Louis Cardinals (1985)
- * Offseason or practice squad member only

Awards and highlights
- National champion (1982)

Career NFL statistics
- Return yards: 19
- Stats at Pro Football Reference

Anthony Vincent Mumford (born June 14, 1963) is an American football former running back who played in the National Football League (NFL). He was selected in the 12th round (328th overall) of the 1985 NFL draft by the New England Patriots after playing college football for the Penn State. He played in two games during the 1985 season for the St. Louis Cardinals.

== College career ==
Mumford was a member of the Penn State Nittany Lions for four seasons. He was a backup running back behind Curt Warner for his first two seasons, including the 1982 national championship team, and part of the running back rotation as a junior and senior. Mumford rushed for 1,103 yards and eight touchdowns during his collegiate career.

== Professional career ==
Mumford was selected in the 12th round of the 1985 NFL draft by the New England Patriots, but was cut by the team before the start of the season. He later signed with the St. Louis Cardinals, playing in two games towards the end of the 1985 season and returning one kickoff for 19 yards.
