= Nick Haden =

American football player (born 1962)

No. 62
- Position: Center

Personal information
- Born: November 7, 1962 (age 63); Pittsburgh, Pennsylvania, U.S.
- Listed height: 6 ft 2 in (1.88 m)
- Listed weight: 270 lb (122 kg)

Career information
- High school: Montour
- College: Penn State
- NFL draft: 1985: 7th round, 192nd overall pick

Career history
- Los Angeles Raiders (1985)*; Philadelphia Eagles (1986)
- * Offseason or practice squad member only

Awards and highlights
- National champion (1982)

Career NFL statistics
- Games played: 8
- Games started: 6
- Stats at Pro Football Reference

Nicholas Scott Haden (born November 7, 1962) is an American former professional football player who was a center in the National Football League (NFL) for the Philadelphia Eagles. He was selected by the Los Angeles Raiders in the seventh round of the 1985 NFL draft. He played college football for the Penn State Nittany Lions.
