= Nathan Sassaman =

US army officer

LTC Nathan Sassaman
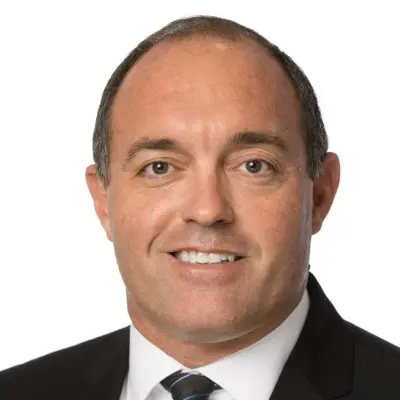
- Born: 1963 (age 62–63)
- Alma mater: United States Military Academy (West Point)
- Children: 2
- Military career
- Allegiance: United States
- Branch: United States Army
- Service years: 1985–2005
- Rank: Lieutenant Colonel
- Unit: 4th Infantry Division
- Conflicts: Iraq War; 2003 invasion of Iraq; Iraqi insurgency (2003–2011)
- Awards: Bronze Star
- Other work: Speaker, Leadership Trainer, Football Coach

Nathan Sassaman (born 1963) is a retired United States Army officer and the author of the 2008 book Warrior King (with Joe Layden) about his experiences in the Iraq War.

Raised in Portland, Oregon, Sassaman was an A student and the son of a Methodist minister who earned appointments to both West Point and the Air Force Academy, and was also recruited by Princeton.

Choosing to attend the United States Military Academy at West Point, he captained and played quarterback on Army's football team in the 1984 season, in which he helped the team achieve one of its best recent records, exceeding all expectations with an 8-3-1 record. In a heralded victory in the annual Army–Navy Game, Sassaman ran for 154 yards and two touchdowns, and later led Army to a rare post-season appearance with a win over Michigan State in the Cherry Bowl, and reportedly, for much of that 1984 season, Sassaman played with three cracked ribs.

Long after his 1985 graduation from West Point, he served in Iraq as commander of the Fourth Infantry Division's 1-8 Battalion in 2003-2004 as a lieutenant colonel.

He earned the Bronze star for rescuing one of his wounded soldiers from his vehicle under heavy machine-gun and R.P.G. fire, after which he then chased down the Iraqi insurgents and killed them. At that time, aged 40, Sassaman was considered to be "the most impressive American field commander in Iraq."

An incident in which some of his troops forced two Iraqi civilian detainees to jump into the Tigris River, one of whom allegedly drowned, led to a reprimand which then effectively ended his military career and he retired in 2005.

Lieutenant Colonel Sassaman is a recipient of the Bronze Star Medal with 'V' for VALOR device; the Defense Meritorious Service Medal; the Meritorious Service Medal with 2 Oak Leaf Clusters; the Joint Service Commendation Medal; the Army Commendation Medal with 2 Oak Leaf Clusters; the Army Achievement Medal with Oak Leaf Cluster and is entitled to wear the Combat Infantryman Badge, the Ranger tab and Army Parachutist Wings.

He currently consults nationally to corporations, public agencies and small businesses, particularly on the subject of leadership.
