= Georgia Tech–Tennessee football rivalry =

American college football rivalry

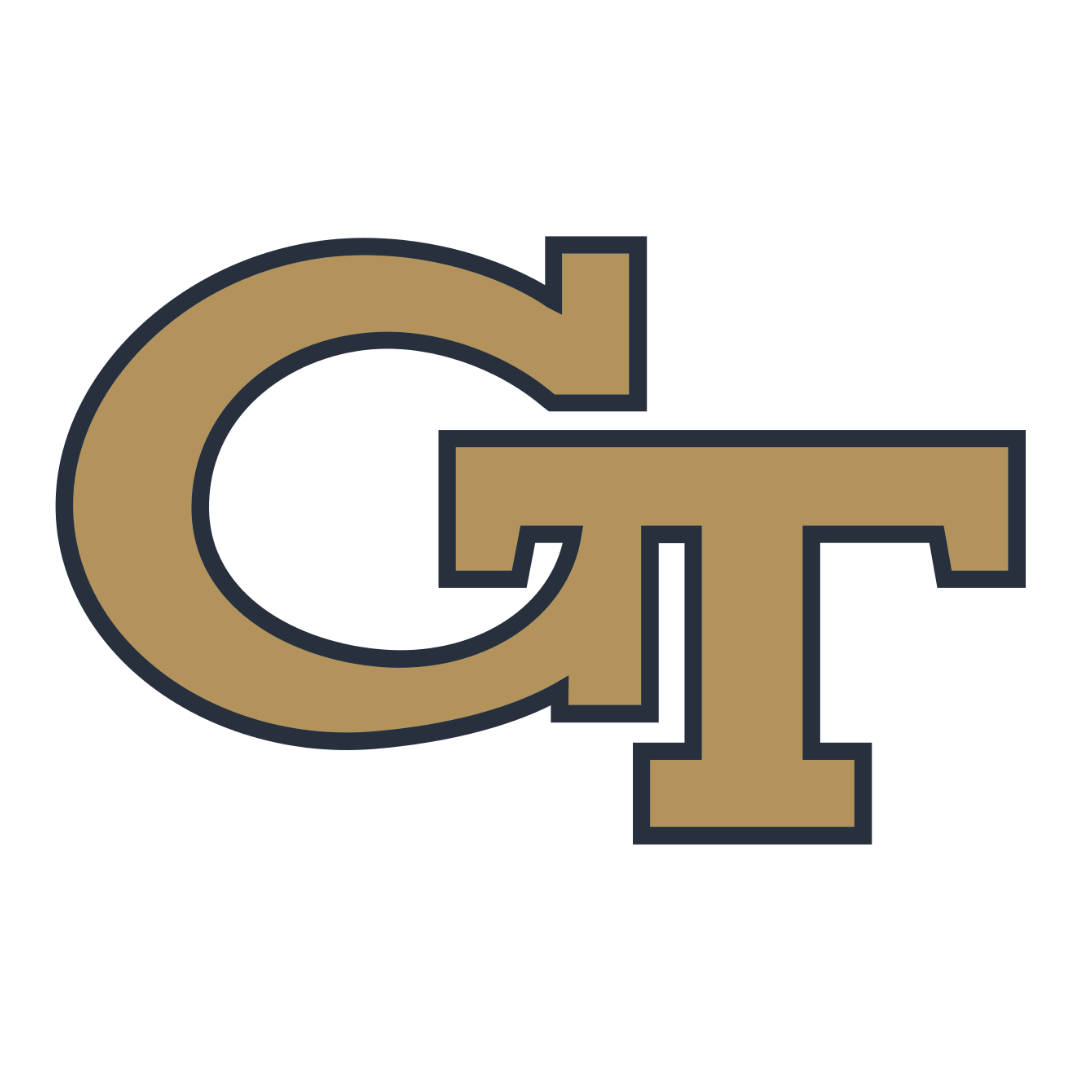
- Georgia Tech Yellow Jackets Tennessee Volunteers
- First meeting: November 22, 1902; Tennessee, 10–6
- Latest meeting: September 12, 2026; Tennessee, 45–24
- Next meeting: August 28, 2027

Statistics
- Total meetings: 45
- All-time series: Tennessee leads, 26–17–2
- Largest victory: Georgia Tech, 45–0 (1905)
- Longest win streak: Tennessee, 8 (1967–1976)
- Current win streak: Tennessee, 3 (1987–present)

Locations of Georgia Tech and Tennessee

The Georgia Tech–Tennessee football rivalry is an American college football rivalry between the Georgia Tech Yellow Jackets and Tennessee Volunteers. The series dates back to 1902 and features two of the most prominent programs in college football history, with Georgia Tech claiming four national championships, 15 conference titles, and 21 consensus All-Americans, and Tennessee claiming six national championships, 16 conference titles, and 38 consensus All-Americans. Tennessee leads the series 26–17–2. The series ended in 1987, but it was renewed in the September 2017 Chick-fil-A Kickoff Game. The programs will meet once again in a home-and-home series, in Atlanta in 2026 and in Knoxville in 2027.

== Series history ==
The teams begin meeting annually in 1946 when Georgia Tech was a member of the SEC. When Georgia Tech left the SEC in 1963, they still played almost every year after (except 1974, 1975, and 1978) until 1987.

=== Notable games ===
Early years

- 1902: The programs met for the first time in Atlanta on November 22, 1902. Tennessee won by a 10–6 score. The last 20 minutes of the game were "played in darkness and a slow, drizzling rain." Two Georgia Tech touchdowns were ruled illegal by the officials.
- 1905: On November 4, 1905, Georgia Tech, coached by John Heisman, defeated Tennessee by a 45–0 score in Atlanta. The game remains notable as the largest point total and the largest margin of victory in series history.

Dodd vs. Neyland

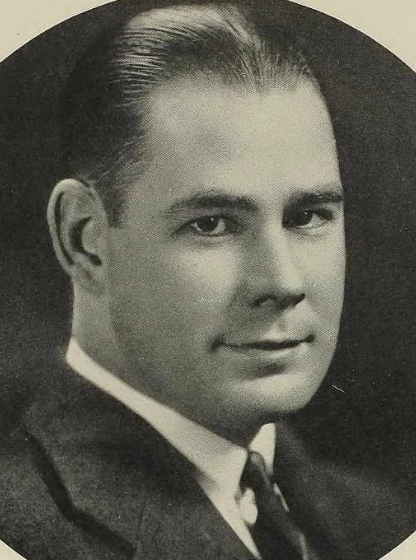
Coach Neyland.

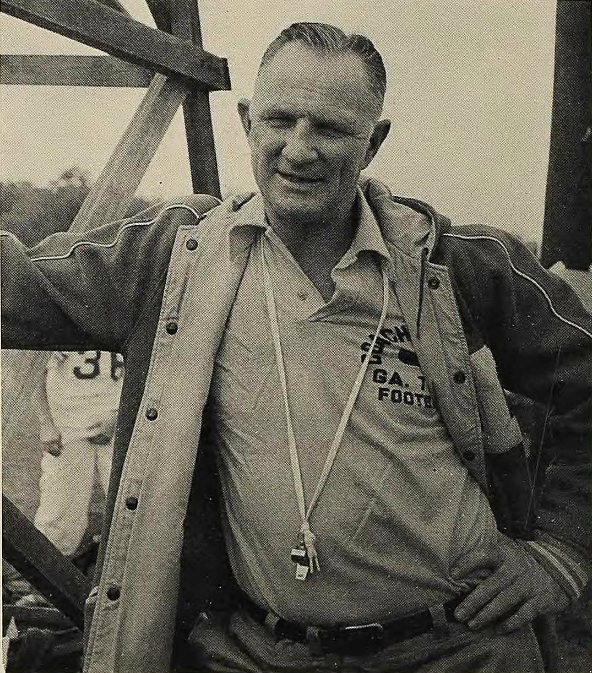
Coach Dodd.

- 1946: On September 28, 1946, after a 35-year hiatus, Georgia Tech and Tennessee resumed their series in a game billed as pitting long-time Tennessee head coach and "master strategist" Robert Neyland against one of "his most illustrious pupils"—Georgia Tech coach Bobby Dodd. Dodd, who wanted to play for Georgia Tech but was not offered a scholarship, had been the quarterback on Neyland's Tennessee teams that compiled a 27–1–2 record from 1928 to 1930 and had taken over as Georgia Tech's head coach in 1931. The game was also notable as Neyland's first game after returning from five years of military service. Neyland's Volunteers defeated Dodd's Yellow Jackets by a 13–9 score in the 1946 game.
- 1947: On September 27, 1947, the teams met again in Atlanta, as Dodd's Yellow Jackets beat the Volunteers by a 27–0 score. The New York Times wrote that Neyland, "the 'old Gray Fox' from Tennessee, got a football lesson today from a former pupil" as Dodd's squad "meted out the worst defeat a Neyland-coached team has ever suffered."
- 1948: On November 6, 1948, Neyland's unranked Volunteers upset Dodd's undefeated, #6-ranked Yellow Jackets by a 13–6 score in Atlanta.
- 1949: On November 5, 1949, Dodd's Yellow Jackets gained revenge for 1948 upset. Georgia Tech came into the game unranked, but upset Neyland's #14-ranked Volunteers by a 30–13 score before a crowd of 48,000 in Knoxville. The Associated Press led its coverage of the game as follows: "An inspired band of Georgia Tech Yellow Jackets unloosed an amazing display of power and razzle-dazzle football today to sting Tennessee, 30–13." The 1949 game was the last to pit Dodd and Neyland against each other as head coaches; Dodd compiled a 2–2 record against his mentor.

Dodd vs. Wyatt

- 1954: After a five-year hiatus, the series was resumed in 1954. Dodd's Yellow Jacket defeated Tennessee, 28–7. Both coaches, Dodd and Bowden Wyatt, were "prize pupils" of former Tennessee head coach, Robert Neyland.
- 1955: On November 5, 1955, unranked Tennessee played #8 Georgia Tech to a 7–7 tie before an overflow crowd of 50,000 in Knoxville. Tailback Johnny Majors led Tennessee to a touchdown on the game's opening drive. After the game, the Tennessee players carried coach Bowden Wyatt on their shoulders for the traditional handshake with Georgia Tech coach Bobby Dodd.
- 1956: On November 10, 1956, the teams met in Atlanta before a capacity crowd of 40,000 with an invitation to the Sugar Bowl going to the winner. Georgia Tech was ranked #2 in the AP poll and Tennessee ranked #3. Tennessee won by a 6–0 score behind the passing of Johnny Majors. Georgia Tech's drive late in the game ended in an interception. The victory catapulted Tennessee to #1 in the AP poll.
- 1957: On November 9, 1957, the programs met with both teams again being ranked, Tennessee at #9 and Georgia Tech at #18. Tennessee won for the second consecutive year, this time by a 21–6 score. Before a record homecoming crowd of 45,500, Bobby Gordon and Bill Anderson led the Volunteers' rushing attack.
- 1959: On October 10, 1959, #8 Tennessee lost to #3 Georgia Tech by a 14–7 score.
- 1961: On November 11, 1961, unranked Tennessee upset #9-ranked Georgia Tech by a 10–6 score.

Dodd vs. Dickey

- 1964: On November 7, 1964, an unranked Tennessee team scored 19 points in the fourth quarter and again upset a ranked (#7) Georgia Tech team, this time by a 22–14 score.
- 1965: On November 6, 1965, unranked Tennessee upset a ranked (#7) Georgia Tech team for the third time in five years. The 1965 game ended in a 21–7 score in favor of the volunteers.
- 1966: On October 8, 1966, the two programs met with both ranked in the top ten, Georgia Tech at #9 and Tennessee at #8. In a nationally televised game, Georgia Tech came out on top, 6 to 3, behind two field goals by Bunky Henry.

Carson vs. Dickey

- 1969: On October 11, 1969, #10 Tennessee defeated Georgia Tech in Knoxville, 26–8. Tennessee receiver Lester McClain caught two touchdown passes, and Tennessee halfback Richmond Flowers carried 20 times for 101 yards.

Carson vs. Battle

- 1970: On October 10, 1970, #20 Tennessee defeated #13 Georgia Tech in Atlanta by a 17–6 score. Tennessee quarterback Bobby Scott threw two touchdown passes to lead the Volunteers, while the Tennessee defense intercepted Georgia Tech quarterback Eddie McAshan four times.

Curry vs. Majors

- 1980: On October 11, 1980, the first meeting between Georgia Tech head coach Bill Curry and Tennessee head coach Johnny Majors, both of whom had returned to their respective alma maters in hopes of restoring them to glory, resulted in a 23–10 Tennessee victory. The game was tied 10–10 going into the fourth quarter, when two long fields goals by Tennessee kicker Alan Duncan and a touchdown run by Tennessee tailback James Berry allowed the Volunteers to pull away.
- 1981: On October 10, 1981, Tennessee edged Georgia Tech 10–7 at Neyland Stadium in Knoxville. With Tennessee leading 3–0 in the third quarter, Georgia Tech linebacker Robert Horton recovered a fumble by Tennessee quarterback Steve Alatorre in the end zone to give the Yellow Jackets a 7–3 lead. Alatorre would respond with a 5-play, 80-yard fourth quarter drive, capped by a 42-yard touchdown pass to Anthony Hancock, to give the Volunteers the win.
- 1982: On October 23, 1982, Curry notched his first victory over Tennessee as the Yellow Jackets defeated the Volunteers 31–21 in Atlanta. Georgia Tech running back Robert Lavette rushed for 139 yards and three touchdowns, and the Yellow Jackets' Jack Westbrook returned a punt 72 yards for a touchdown in the second quarter. Tennessee kicker Fuad Reveiz hit an SEC-record 60-yard field goal as time expired in the first half.
- 1984: On October 27, 1984, Tennessee defeated Georgia Tech 24–21 in a wild game in Atlanta. After a Lavette touchdown gave Georgia Tech an early lead, Tennessee responded with a touchdown run by Tony Robinson and two Fuad Reveiz field goals. A 30-yard touchdown pass from Georgia Tech quarterback John Dewberry to Gary Lee, however, gave the Yellow Jackets a 14–13 halftime lead. Tennessee again took the lead 21–14 in the fourth quarter on a touchdown pass and two-point conversion pass by Robinson, but Georgia Tech quickly responded with a 59-yard run by Lavette to the 2-yard line and a touchdown by Dewberry on the ensuing play to tie the game. Robinson engineered one final drive late in the fourth, highlighted by a 31-yard, fourth down pass to Jeff Smith, to set up Reveiz's game-winning 22-yard field goal.
- 1985: On October 26, 1985, Tennessee and Georgia Tech played to a 6–6 tie in a game dominated by the two teams' heralded defenses, namely Georgia Tech's "Black Watch" defense, and Tennessee's "Big Orange Crush" defense. An early Tennessee turnover allowed Georgia Tech to take a 3–0 lead, which remained the only score until the fourth quarter, when a David Bell field goal extended the Yellow Jackets' lead to 6–0. Tennessee quarterback Daryl Dickey engineered three fourth-quarter drives into Georgia Tech territory, the first culminating with a 55-yard field goal by Carlos Reveiz, the second ending with a 21-yard missed field goal by Reveiz, and the third culminating in a 51-yard field goal by Reveiz with just seconds remaining to tie the game at 6.
- 1986: On October 25, 1986, Georgia Tech edged Tennessee 14–13 in Atlanta. With Tennessee nursing a 13–7 lead early in the fourth quarter, Georgia Tech quarterback Rick Strom engineered a 70-yard drive, which he capped with a 3-yard touchdown run, to give the Yellow Jackets the lead. Tennessee quarterback Jeff Francis led the Volunteers on one final drive to the Georgia Tech 10-yard line with less than two minutes remaining, but Carlos Reveiz's 27-yard field goal attempt bounced off the upright, sealing the win for Georgia Tech.

2017 Chick-fil-A Kickoff Game

- 2017: In their first meeting since 1987, the Volunteers never had the lead in regulation play, largely due to the consistent success of Georgia Tech's triple option, but scored twice in the fourth quarter, a Marquez Callaway 50-yard receiving touchdown and a John Kelly 11-yard rushing touchdown, to tie the game at 28 and force overtime. Each team traded touchdowns through two overtimes with Georgia Tech ultimately seeking to win the game on a two-point conversion. However, quarterback TaQuon Marshall was tackled short of the endzone and Tennessee secured the 42–41 win.

== Game results ==
Georgia Tech victories	Tennessee victories	Tie games

No.	Date	Location	Winning team		Losing team	
1	November 22, 1902	Atlanta, GA	Tennessee	10	Georgia Tech	6
2	November 21, 1903	Knoxville, TN	Tennessee	11	Georgia Tech	0
3	October 22, 1904	Atlanta, GA	Georgia Tech	2	Tennessee	0
4	November 4, 1905	Atlanta, GA	Georgia Tech	45	Tennessee	0
5	October 19, 1907	Atlanta, GA	Georgia Tech	6	Tennessee	4
6	October 31, 1908	Atlanta, GA	Tennessee	6	Georgia Tech	5
7	October 30, 1909	Atlanta, GA	Georgia Tech	29	Tennessee	0
8	October 14, 1911	Atlanta, GA	Georgia Tech	24	Tennessee	0
9	September 28, 1946	Knoxville, TN	Tennessee	14	Georgia Tech	9
10	September 27, 1947	Atlanta, GA	Georgia Tech	27	Tennessee	0
11	November 6, 1948	Atlanta, GA	Tennessee	13	No. 6 Georgia Tech	6
12	November 5, 1949	Knoxville, TN	Georgia Tech	13	No. 14 Tennessee	6
13	November 6, 1954	Atlanta, GA	Georgia Tech	28	Tennessee	7
14	November 5, 1955	Knoxville, TN	Tie	7	Tie	7
15	November 10, 1956	Atlanta, GA	No. 3 Tennessee	6	No. 2 Georgia Tech	0
16	November 9, 1957	Knoxville, TN	No. 9 Tennessee	21	No. 18 Georgia Tech	6
17	October 11, 1958	Atlanta, GA	Georgia Tech	21	Tennessee	7
18	October 10, 1959	Knoxville, TN	No. 3 Georgia Tech	14	No. 8 Tennessee	7
19	November 5, 1960	Atlanta, GA	Georgia Tech	14	No. 8 Tennessee	7
20	November 11, 1961	Knoxville, TN	Tennessee	10	No. 9 Georgia Tech	6
21	October 13, 1962	Atlanta, GA	Georgia Tech	17	Tennessee	0
22	October 12, 1963	Knoxville, TN	Georgia Tech	23	Tennessee	7
23	November 7, 1964	Atlanta, GA	Tennessee	22	No. 7 Georgia Tech	14

No.	Date	Location	Winning team		Losing team	
24	November 6, 1965	Knoxville, TN	Tennessee	21	No. 7 Georgia Tech	7
25	October 8, 1966	Atlanta, GA	No. 9 Georgia Tech	6	No. 8 Tennessee	3
26	October 14, 1967	Knoxville, TN	Tennessee	24	Georgia Tech	13
27	October 12, 1968	Atlanta, GA	No. 10 Tennessee	24	Georgia Tech	7
28	October 11, 1969	Knoxville, TN	No. 10 Tennessee	26	Georgia Tech	8
29	October 10, 1970	Atlanta, GA	No. 20 Tennessee	17	No. 13 Georgia Tech	6
30	October 9, 1971	Knoxville, TN	No. 13 Tennessee	10	Georgia Tech	6
31	September 9, 1972	Atlanta, GA	No. 15 Tennessee	34	Georgia Tech	3
32	October 13, 1973	Knoxville, TN	No. 8 Tennessee	20	Georgia Tech	14
33	October 9, 1976	Atlanta, GA	Tennessee	42	Georgia Tech	7
34	October 8, 1977	Knoxville, TN	Georgia Tech	24	Tennessee	8
35	October 13, 1979	Knoxville, TN	Tennessee	31	Georgia Tech	0
36	October 11, 1980	Atlanta, GA	Tennessee	23	Georgia Tech	10
37	October 10, 1981	Knoxville, TN	Tennessee	10	Georgia Tech	7
38	October 23, 1982	Atlanta, GA	Georgia Tech	31	Tennessee	21
39	October 22, 1983	Knoxville, TN	Tennessee	37	Georgia Tech	3
40	October 27, 1984	Atlanta, GA	Tennessee	24	Georgia Tech	21
41	October 26, 1985	Knoxville, TN	Tie	6	Tie	6
42	October 25, 1986	Atlanta, GA	Georgia Tech	14	Tennessee	13
43	October 24, 1987	Knoxville, TN	No. 13 Tennessee	29	Georgia Tech	15
44	September 4, 2017	Atlanta, GA	No. 25 Tennessee	42	Georgia Tech	41^{2OT}
45	September 12, 2026	Atlanta, GA	No. 18 Tennessee	45	Georgia Tech	24
Series: Tennessee leads 26–17–2

== See also ==
- List of NCAA college football rivalry games
