= 1985 Tennessee Volunteers football team =

American college football season

1985 Tennessee Volunteers football

SEC champion Sugar Bowl champion

Sugar Bowl, W 35–7 vs. Miami (FL)
- Conference: Southeastern Conference

Ranking
- Coaches: No. 4
- AP: No. 4
- Record: 9–1–2 (5–1 SEC)
- Head coach: Johnny Majors (9th season)
- Offensive coordinator: Walt Harris (3rd season)
- Defensive coordinator: Ken Donahue (1st season)
- Captains: Tim McGee; Tommy Sims; Chris White
- Home stadium: Neyland Stadium

1985 Southeastern Conference football standings
	Conf.					Overall
Team	W		L		T	W		L		T
No. 4 Tennessee $	5	–	1	–	0	9	–	1	–	2
No. 5 Florida	5	–	1	–	0	9	–	1	–	1
No. 13 Alabama	4	–	1	–	1	9	–	2	–	1
No. 20 LSU	4	–	1	–	1	9	–	2	–	1
Georgia	3	–	2	–	1	7	–	3	–	2
Auburn	3	–	3	–	0	8	–	4	–	0
Ole Miss	2	–	4	–	0	4	–	6	–	1
Vanderbilt	1	–	4	–	1	3	–	7	–	1
Kentucky	1	–	5	–	0	5	–	6	–	0
Mississippi State	0	–	6	–	0	5	–	6	–	0
$ – Conference champion; Florida ineligible for SEC championship due to NCAA probation.; Rankings from AP Poll

The 1985 Tennessee Volunteers football team (variously "Tennessee", "UT" or the "Vols") represented the University of Tennessee in the 1985 NCAA Division I-A football season. Playing as a member of the Southeastern Conference (SEC), the team was led by head coach Johnny Majors, in his ninth year, and played their home games at Neyland Stadium in Knoxville, Tennessee. They finished the season with a record of nine wins, one loss and two ties (9–1–2 overall, 5–1 in the SEC), as SEC champions and with a victory over Miami in the 1986 Sugar Bowl. The Volunteers offense scored 325 points while the defense allowed 140 points. At season's end, the Volunteers ranked fourth in both the AP Poll and the Coaches' Poll.

Known to fans as the Sugar Vols for their Sugar Bowl victory, the 1985 squad were known by their fans as a memorable team in UT football history. The team's SEC Championship was the first for the program in 16 years, and its top ten ranking was the program's first in 13 years.

After a strong start to the season, Tennessee suffered a major setback when star quarterback and Heisman Trophy candidate Tony Robinson suffered a season-ending knee injury in a close game against Alabama. The team rallied to finish 6–0–1, however, led by backup quarterback Daryl Dickey, and a defense – nicknamed the "Orange Crush" – that allowed just four touchdowns in its final seven games. The 1986 Sugar Bowl has been ranked among the team's ten greatest victories of all time.

== Before the season ==
The 1984 Tennessee squad had managed a 7–4–1 record, ending with a narrow 28–27 loss to Maryland in the Sun Bowl. While they had defeated rival Alabama 28–27, they lost important games to Auburn and Florida, and had been upset by Kentucky.

Prior to the 1985 season, long-time athletic director Bob Woodruff announced his retirement. Head coach Johnny Majors expressed interest in serving as both coach and athletic director, but the university hired former coach Doug Dickey.

=== Returning players and roster changes ===
Quarterback Tony Robinson entered the 1985 season as a candidate for the Heisman Trophy. During the 1984 season, he had completed 156 of 253 passes for 1,963 yards, falling just short of his predecessor Alan Cockrell's single-season record of 2,021 yards (set in 1983). His 61.7% completion percentage had broken the single-season record set by Johnny Majors in 1956. Fifth-year senior Daryl Dickey, Robinson's backup, would start the final seven games after Robinson suffered a season-ending knee injury. Three redshirt freshmen were competing for the third-string quarterback slot: Jeff Francis, Randy Sanders, and Greg Hargis.

All-American prospect Tim McGee was the leading returning wide receiver, having caught a school record 54 passes in 1984. McGee entered the 1985 season needing 45 catches, 828 yards, and 5 touchdowns to set school career records in all three categories, a feat which he would accomplish. McGee was joined in the starting lineup by junior college transfer Eric Swanson (20 catches for 186 yards in 1984), while junior Joey Clinkscales and sophomore Vince Carter would see significant playing time. Olympic sprinter Sam Graddy joined the team as a receiver during spring practice. Senior Jeff Smith (6'3", 235 pounds), who had caught 26 passes for 416 yards in 1984, was the team's starting tight end, while Tim Hendrix (6'5", 223) would see significant playing time.

The running back slot was wide open following the graduation of 2nd-team All American Johnnie Jones. Sophomore Charles Wilson began the season as the starter, and was joined by redshirt freshman Keith Davis and junior Pete Panuska. One notable addition to the running back corps was Jeff Powell, a member of the track team who had been awarded the football team's final scholarship at the end of spring practice. Fullback duties were handled by 250-pound junior Sam Henderson, 225-pound sophomore William Howard and 230-pound junior Jim Miller.

The offensive line had lost Raleigh McKenzie and Bill Mayo to graduation, but returned future NFL players David Douglas (6'4", 266 pounds), Bruce Wilkerson (6'5", 258), Daryle Smith (6'5", 257), John Bruhin (6'4", 273), and Harry Galbreath (6'1", 260). Todd Kirk (6'3", 257) was the starting center. Tony Williams (6'3", 272) would also see playing time.

On defense, the Vols had lost three linebackers to the NFL Draft: Carl Zander, Alvin Toles, and Reggie McKenzie. The key returning linebacker was Dale Jones, who had registered 109 tackles in 1984, and had garnered a reputation for making big plays. Jones was joined by senior Lavoisier Fisher, junior Tyrone Robinson, sophomores Kelly Ziegler and Darrin Miller, and freshman Bryan Kimbro. The defensive line was led by senior Richard Brown (6'1", 263 pounds) and junior Robby Scott (6'1", 274), while sophomores Mark Hovanic (6'3", 245), Fred Bennett (6'0", 258) and Richard Cooper (6'6", 272) had shown promise as freshmen.

The Vols' secondary was considered the strongest part of the defense at the beginning of the season, with Tommy Sims and Terry Brown registering strong seasons in 1984. They were joined by junior Charles Davis and sophomores Terry McDaniel, Andre Creamer and Victor Peppers. Chris White, a fifth-year senior who had seen scant playing time prior the 1985 season, would come off the bench to lead the team with 9 interceptions and receive All-American honors.

The Vols' special teams were also dealing with inexperience, having lost kicker Fuad Reveiz and punter Jimmy Colquitt to the NFL. Carlos Reveiz, Fuad's younger brother, stepped in at kicker, while sophomore Bob Garmon was named the starting punter. Joel Farmer was the team's long snapper, while Randy Sanders was the primary holder. Tim McGee and Andre Creamer handled punt returns, while Pete Panuska, Keith Davis, and Jeff Powell handled kick returns at various times during the season.

== Coaching staff ==
Head coach Johnny Majors had compiled a 108–82–5 record during his 17 years as a head coach, which included five seasons with Iowa State (1968–1972), four with Pittsburgh (1973–1976), and eight with Tennessee (1977–1984). His record at UT at the start of the 1985 season was 51–39–3. While he had taken the Vols to four consecutive bowl games, he had yet to win an SEC Championship.

The most notable addition to the Tennessee coaching staff was Ken Donahue, who had worked as an assistant coach under Alabama's Bear Bryant for 21 years. Donahue was initially hired as a defensive line coach in February 1985, but was promoted to defensive coordinator in March after Larry Marmie announced he was leaving for Arizona State. Prior to Spring practice, long-time Vol assistant George Cafego retired. In late March, the Vols hired Tennessee Tech defensive coordinator Dick Bumpas to coach linebackers.

Four members of the 1985 staff later became head coaches at Division I programs: Walt Harris, Phillip Fulmer, David Cutcliffe and Ron Zook. Kippy Brown has worked as an assistant coach in the NFL, and was briefly UT's interim head coach following the abrupt departure of Lane Kiffin in January 2010. Gerald Brown, an administrative assistant, later became the running backs coach for the Atlanta Falcons.

Bruno Pauletto, the Vols' strength coach, was an Olympic shot putter who won the gold medal for the Canadian team at the 1982 Commonwealth Games, and was a member of the Canadian team at the 1984 Olympics.

Name	Position	Season
Johnny Majors	Head coach	9th
Ken Donahue	Defensive coordinator	1st
Walt Harris	Offensive coordinator	3rd
Ralph Chancey	Administrative assistant	7th
Kippy Brown	Wide receivers	3rd
Dick Bumpas	Inside linebackers	1st
David Cutcliffe	Tight ends	4th
Mel Foels	Outside linebackers	2nd
Phillip Fulmer	Offensive line	6th
Bill Higdon	Recruiting coordinator	11th
Doug Mathews	Running backs	6th
Ron Zook	Defensive backs	2nd
Bruno Pauletto	Strength coach	6th

== Schedule ==
The Vols opened the 1985 campaign hosting #10 UCLA, which was coming off a 9–3 season in 1984, and had defeated defending national champion BYU in their first game of the 1985 season. Bruins coach Terry Donahue entered the game needing one win to become UCLA's all-time winningest football coach. The Bruins' offense featured running back Gaston Green, two future NFL receivers, Willie "Flipper" Anderson and Mike Sherrard, and All-American kicker John Lee. Matt Stevens and David Norrie were vying for time at quarterback.

Following a bye week, the Vols hosted the Auburn Tigers, who entered the game ranked #1 in the nation, and had defeated the Vols in the teams' previous three meetings. The Tigers' offense was led by eventual Heisman Trophy winner Bo Jackson, who had averaged 247.5 yards per game and nearly 10 yards per carry in his first two games of the season. Auburn struggled with uncertainty at quarterback, however, with Jeff Burger, Bobby Walden, and Pat Washington all vying for the starting position.

After hosting Wake Forest, the Vols traveled to Gainesville to play the Florida Gators. Florida coach Galen Hall entered the game with an 11–0–1 record, having shut out LSU the previous week. Florida's offense featured the school's all-time leading rusher Neal Anderson and John L. Williams in the backfield, quarterback Kerwin Bell, and future NFL receiver Ricky Nattiel. Many Gator fans saw this game as an opportunity for revenge, as they blamed Tennessee for leading the movement to strip the Gators of their 1984 SEC Championship for rules violations committed under Hall's predecessor, Charley Pell.

In the fifth game of the season, the Vols visited Alabama for the "Third Saturday in October" rivalry. The Tide entered the game 4–1 following a 19–17 loss to Penn State in the previous week. The Vols had won the teams' previous three meetings, and desperately needed a win to stay in contention for the SEC Championship. The Tide was led by quarterback Mike Shula (the son of NFL coach Don Shula) and future All-American running back Bobby Humphrey on offense, and All-American linebacker Cornelius Bennett on defense.

Tennessee hosted Georgia Tech for its sixth game of the season. The Yellow Jackets entered the game 4–2 following a narrow loss to Auburn in the previous week. The Vols had edged Georgia Tech 24–21 the previous year, but were playing without star quarterback Tony Robinson, who had suffered a season-ending knee injury against Alabama. The Yellow Jackets' offense was led by All-ACC quarterback John Dewberry and receiver Gary Lee, though leading rushers Cory Collier and Jerry Mays were out with injuries. Linebacker Ted Roof and lineman Pat Swilling led the Jackets' elite "Black Watch" unit on defense.

After playing Rutgers in Knoxville and visiting Memphis State, the Vols began their final conference stretch by hosting Ole Miss. A tie between Alabama and LSU the previous week had left Tennessee and Florida tied for first place in the conference, and with Florida ineligible, the Vols needed only to win their final three games to win the SEC Championship. The Rebels were led by freshman quarterback Chris Osgood (starting in place of the injured Kent Austin), running back Nathan Wonsley, and receiver J.R. Ambrose.

In the next-to-last game of the regular season, the Vols traveled to Lexington to play Kentucky in the annual Battle for the Barrel. Kentucky entered the game 5–5 under fourth-year head coach Jerry Claiborne, and had won the teams' previous meeting in Knoxville, 17–12. In the final game of the regular season, the Vols played host to Vanderbilt, which entered the game 3–6–1.

As SEC champions, Tennessee received an automatic berth in the 1986 Sugar Bowl, played on New Year's Day in New Orleans. Their opponent, Miami, entered the game with a 10-game winning streak, which was capped by a 58–7 blowout of Notre Dame. Ranked #2 in the nation, Miami needed a win over Tennessee and a loss by Penn State in the Orange Bowl to lay claim to the national title. Under second-year coach Jimmy Johnson, the Hurricanes featured numerous future NFL players, including quarterback Vinny Testaverde, running backs Alonzo Highsmith, Warren Williams, and Mel Bratton, receivers Michael Irvin and Brian Blades, All-American tight end Willie Smith, and a defense led by linemen Jerome Brown and Kevin Fagan, linebacker Winston Moss, and defensive back Bennie Blades. The Vols would go on to destroy the overconfident Miami Hurricanes 35–7.

Date	Opponent	Rank	Site	TV	Result	Attendance	Source
September 14	No. 10 UCLA*		Neyland Stadium; Knoxville, TN	ABC	T 26–26	94,370	
September 28	No. 1 Auburn		Neyland Stadium; Knoxville, TN (rivalry)	ABC	W 38–20	94,358	
October 5	Wake Forest*	No. 16	Neyland Stadium; Knoxville, TN		W 31–29	93,345	
October 12	at No. 7 Florida	No. 14	Florida Field; Gainesville, FL (rivalry)		L 10–17	74,432	
October 19	at No. 15 Alabama	No. 20	Legion Field; Birmingham, AL (Third Saturday in October)	TBS	W 16–14	75,808	
October 26	Georgia Tech*	No. 16	Neyland Stadium; Knoxville, TN (rivalry)	ESPN	T 6–6	94,575	
November 2	Rutgers*^{†}	No. 19	Neyland Stadium; Knoxville, TN		W 40–0	92,188	
November 9	at Memphis State*	No. 19	Liberty Bowl Memorial Stadium; Memphis, TN		W 17–7	49,617	
November 16	Ole Miss	No. 18	Neyland Stadium; Knoxville, TN (rivalry)	TBS	W 34–14	92,482	
November 23	at Kentucky	No. 16	Commonwealth Stadium; Lexington, KY (rivalry)	TBS	W 42–0	57,160	
November 30	Vanderbilt	No. 10	Neyland Stadium; Knoxville, TN (rivalry)	TBS	W 30–0	97,372	
January 1, 1986	vs. No. 2 Miami (FL)*	No. 8	Louisiana Superdome; New Orleans, LA (Sugar Bowl)	ABC	W 35–7	77,432	
*Non-conference game; ^{†}Homecoming; Rankings from AP Poll released prior to the game

== Game summaries ==
=== UCLA ===
#10 UCLA (1–0) at Tennessee (0–0)

Quarter	1	2	3	4	Total
UCLA	10	0	0	16	26
Tennessee	0	13	7	6	26

at Neyland Stadium, Knoxville, Tennessee

- Date: September 14, 1985
- Game attendance: 94,370
- TV announcers (ABC): Keith Jackson (play-by-play), Frank Broyles (color), Tim Brant (sideline)

Game information

1st Quarter

- UCLA – Gaston Green 72-yard run (John Lee kick)
- UCLA – Lee 39-yard field goal

2nd Quarter

- TENN – Carlos Reveiz 49-yard field goal
- TENN – Tim Hendrix 4-yard pass from Tony Robinson (Reveiz kick)
- TENN – Reveiz 33-yard field goal

3rd Quarter

- TENN – Joey Clinkscales 68-yard pass from Robinson (Reveiz kick)

4th Quarter

- TENN – Reveiz 31-yard field goal
- TENN – Reveiz 40-yard field goal
- UCLA – Al Wilson 8-yard pass from David Norrie (Jeff Nowinski pass from Norrie)
- UCLA – Willie Anderson 25-yard pass from Norrie (Green run)

Passing

- UCLA – Norrie 10/15, 138, 2 TD, 1 INT
- TENN – Robinson 23/35, 387, 2 TD

Rushing

- UCLA – Green 24–194–1
- TENN – Wilson 12–45

Receiving

- UCLA – Sherrard 7–120
- TENN – McGee 5–142; Clinkscales 4–106–1

=== Auburn ===
#1 Auburn (2–0) at Tennessee (0–0–1)

Quarter	1	2	3	4	Total
Auburn	0	0	0	20	20
Tennessee	14	10	0	14	38

at Neyland Stadium, Knoxville, Tennessee

- Date: September 28, 1985
- Game attendance: 94,358
- TV announcers (ABC): Keith Jackson (play-by-play), Frank Broyles (color), Tim Brant (sideline)

Game information

1st Quarter

- TENN – Charles Wilson 6-yard run (Carlos Reveiz kick)
- TENN – Tim McGee 37-yard pass from Tony Robinson (Reveiz kick)

2nd Quarter

- TENN – Vince Carter 4-yard pass from Robinson (Reveiz kick)
- TENN – Reveiz 27-yard field goal

4th Quarter

- AUB – Tommie Agee 1-yard run (2pt conversion failed)
- TENN – Joey Clinkscales 10-yard pass from Robinson (Reveiz kick)
- AUB – Brent Fullwood 7-yard run (2pt conversion failed)
- TENN – Eric Swanson 30-yard pass from Robinson (Reveiz kick)
- AUB – Kyle Collins 4-yard pass from Bobby Walden (Curtis Stewart run)

Passing

- AUB – Walden 6/18, 71, 1 TD, 3 INT
- TENN – Robinson 17/30, 259, 4 TD, 3 INT

Rushing

- AUB – Fullwood 15–96–1, Jackson 17–80
- TENN – Davis 13–102; Robinson 6–33

Receiving

- AUB – Gainous 1–17
- TENN – McGee 6–163–1

=== Wake Forest ===
Wake Forest (3–1) at #16 Tennessee (1–0–1)

Quarter	1	2	3	4	Total
Wake Forest	7	0	7	15	29
Tennessee	14	0	10	7	31

at Neyland Stadium, Knoxville, Tennessee

- Date: October 5, 1985
- Game attendance: 93,345

Game information

1st Quarter

- TENN – Pete Panuska 1-yard run (Carlos Reveiz kick)
- WAKE – Michael Ramseur 5-yard run (Jeff Miller kick)
- TENN – Tony Robinson 1-yard run (Reveiz kick)

3rd Quarter

- TENN – Keith Davis 22-yard run (Reveiz kick)
- WAKE – Topper Clemons 4-yard pass from Foy White (Miller kick)
- TENN – Reveiz 52-yard field goal

4th Quarter

- TENN – Joey Clinkscales 9-yard pass from Robinson (Reveiz kick)
- WAKE – James Brim 7-yard pass from White (Ramseur run)
- WAKE – Greg Scales 18-yard pass from White (Miller kick)

Passing

- WAKE – White 24/39, 270, 3 TD, 1 INT
- TENN – Robinson 13/23, 170, 1 TD, 1 INT

Rushing

- WAKE – Clemons 18–111; Ramseur 19–92–1
- TENN – Davis 21–102–1

Receiving

- WAKE – Scales 5–41–1; Brim 3–21–1
- TENN – McGee 4–82; Clinkscales 2–52–1

=== Florida ===
#14 Tennessee (2–0–1) at #7 Florida (3–0–1)

Quarter	1	2	3	4	Total
Tennessee	0	3	0	7	10
Florida	0	3	14	0	17

at Florida Field, Gainesville, Florida

- Date: October 12, 1985
- Game attendance: 74,432

Game information

2nd Quarter

- FLOR – Jeff Dawson 42-yard field goal
- TENN – Carlos Reveiz 33-yard field goal

3rd Quarter

- FLOR – Neal Anderson 9-yard run (Dawson kick)
- FLOR – Anderson 1-yard run (Dawson kick)

4th Quarter

- TENN – Tim McGee 20-yard pass from Tony Robinson (Reveiz kick)

Passing

- TENN – Robinson 26/36, 300, 1 TD, 2 INT
- FLOR – Bell 12/17, 143, 1 INT

Rushing

- TENN – Davis 10–46; Henderson 4–19
- FLOR – Anderson 29–160–2; Williams 13–39

Receiving

- TENN – Clinkscales 7–101; McGee 6–91–1
- FLOR – Williams 5–47

=== Alabama ===
#20 Tennessee (2–1–1) at #15 Alabama (4–1)

Quarter	1	2	3	4	Total
Tennessee	0	10	3	3	16
Alabama	0	7	0	7	14

at Legion Field, Birmingham, Alabama

- Date: October 19, 1985
- Game attendance: 75,808
- TV announcers (TBS): Bob Neal (play-by-play), Tim Foley (color)

Game information

2nd Quarter

- TENN – Charles Wilson 1-yard run (Carlos Reveiz kick)
- ALA – Craig Turner 1-yard run (Van Tiffin kick)
- TENN – Reveiz 38-yard field goal

3rd Quarter

- TENN – Reveiz 48-yard field goal

4th Quarter

- TENN – Reveiz 28-yard field goal
- ALA – Bobby Humphrey 19-yard pass from Mike Shula (Tiffin kick)

Passing

- TENN – Robinson 10/19, 130, 1 INT; Dickey 1/5, 2
- ALA – Shula 16/29, 216, 1 TD, 2 INT

Rushing

- TENN – Davis 27–141
- ALA – Humphrey 14–59

Receiving

- TENN – Wilson 5–42
- ALA – Turner 8–45

=== Georgia Tech ===
Georgia Tech (4–2) at #16 Tennessee (3–1–1)

Quarter	1	2	3	4	Total
Georgia Tech	3	0	0	3	6
Tennessee	0	0	0	6	6

at Neyland Stadium, Knoxville, Tennessee

- Date: October 26, 1985
- Game attendance: 94,575
- TV announcers (ESPN): Jim Simpson (play-by-play), Paul Maguire (color)

Game information

1st Quarter

- TECH – Thomas Palmer 22-yard field goal

4th Quarter

- TECH – David Bell 28-yard field goal
- TENN – Carlos Reveiz 55-yard field goal
- TENN – Reveiz 51-yard field goal

Passing

- TECH – Dewberry 12/18, 113, 1 INT
- TENN – Dickey 16/22, 153, 1 INT

Rushing

- TECH – King 25–65; Mack 7–23
- TENN – Davis 19–56; Howard 5–21

Receiving

- TECH – Manion 2–35; Lee 2–35
- TENN – McGee 4–41; Davis 6–32

=== Rutgers ===
Rutgers (1–5–1) at #19 Tennessee (3–1–2)

Quarter	1	2	3	4	Total
Rutgers	0	0	0	0	0
Tennessee	14	10	6	10	40

at Neyland Stadium, Knoxville, Tennessee

- Date: November 2, 1985
- Game attendance: 92,188

Game information

1st Quarter

- TENN – Keith Davis 7-yard pass from Daryl Dickey (Carlos Reveiz kick)
- TENN – Chris White 55-yard interception return (Reveiz kick)

2nd Quarter

- TENN – Davis 1-yard run (Reveiz kick)
- TENN – Reveiz 44-yard field goal

3rd Quarter

- TENN – Reveiz 48-yard field goal
- TENN – Reveiz 34-yard field goal

4th Quarter

- TENN – Reveiz 44-yard field goal
- TENN – Pete Panuska 57-yard run (Reveiz kick)

Passing

- RUT – Hochberg 16/32, 99, 2 INT
- TENN – Dickey 16/21, 194, 1 TD

Rushing

- RUT – Henderson 8–45
- TENN – Panuska 4–69–1; Davis 17–68–1

Receiving

- RUT – A. Smith 6–27
- TENN – McGee 5–105; J. Smith 3–69

=== Memphis State ===
#19 Tennessee (4–1–2) at Memphis State (2–5–2)

Quarter	1	2	3	4	Total
Tennessee	3	14	0	0	17
Memphis State	7	0	0	0	7

at Liberty Bowl, Memphis, Tennessee

- Date: November 9, 1985
- Game attendance: 49,617

Game information

1st Quarter

- TENN – Carlos Reveiz 23-yard field goal
- MSU – Dan Harkins 24-yard blocked punt return (Thomas Ingles kick)

2nd Quarter

- TENN – Tim McGee 19-yard pass from Daryl Dickey (Reveiz kick)
- TENN – Eric Swanson 9-yard pass from Dickey (Reveiz kick)

Passing

- TENN – Dickey 8/17, 128, 2 TD
- MSU – Sparkman 14/21, 147, 2 INT

Rushing

- TENN – Powell 12–47; Henderson 9–31
- MSU – Womack 22–110

Receiving

- TENN – J. Smith 2–56; Howard 2–22
- MSU – J. Harris 3–55

=== Ole Miss ===
Ole Miss (3–5–1) at #18 Tennessee (5–1–2)

Quarter	1	2	3	4	Total
Ole Miss	0	7	0	7	14
Tennessee	7	10	7	10	34

at Neyland Stadium, Knoxville, Tennessee

- Date: November 16, 1985
- Game attendance: 92,482
- TV announcers (TBS): Bob Neal (play-by-play), Tim Foley (color)

Game information

1st Quarter

- TENN – Sam Henderson 2-yard run (Carlos Reveiz kick)

2nd Quarter

- MISS – Shawn Sykes 1-yard run (Bryan Owen kick)
- TENN – Reveiz 43-yard field goal
- TENN – Tim Hendrix 11-yard pass from Jeff Francis (Reveiz kick)

3rd Quarter

- TENN – Henderson 2-yard run (Reveiz kick)

4th Quarter

- TENN – Tim McGee 19-yard pass from Daryl Dickey (Reveiz kick)
- TENN – Reveiz 36-yard field goal
- MISS – J. R. Ambrose 19-yard pass from Mark Young (Owen kick)

Passing

- MISS – Osgood 4/20, 49, 2 INT
- TENN – Dickey 11/17, 203, 1 TD; Francis 5/8 44, 1 TD, 1 INT

Rushing

- MISS – Wonsley 21–65; Sykes 9–37–1
- TENN – Henderson 15–45–2

Receiving

- MISS – Perry 2–14; Ambrose 1–19
- TENN – McGee 7–117–1; J. Smith 2–74

=== Kentucky ===
#16 Tennessee (6–1–2) at Kentucky (5–5)

Quarter	1	2	3	4	Total
Tennessee	3	3	22	14	42
Kentucky	0	0	0	0	0

at Commonwealth Stadium, Lexington, Kentucky

- Date: November 23, 1985
- Game attendance: 57,160
- TV announcers (TBS): Bob Neal (play-by-play), Tim Foley (color)

Game information

1st Quarter

- TENN – Carlos Reveiz 42-yard field goal

2nd Quarter

- TENN – Reveiz 49-yard field goal

3rd Quarter

- TENN – Tim McGee 37-yard pass from Daryl Dickey (Jeff Smith pass from Dickey)
- TENN – McGee 12-yard pass from Dickey (Reveiz kick)
- TENN – Joey Clinkscales 19-yard pass from Dickey (Reveiz kick)

4th Quarter

- TENN – Dickey 1-yard run (Reveiz kick)
- TENN – Pete Panuska 8-yard run (Reveiz kick)

Passing

- TENN – Dickey 11/17, 182, 3 TD
- KENT – Ransdell 11/19, 74

Rushing

- TENN – Powell 16–88; Davis 11–79
- KENT – Logan 10–72

Receiving

- TENN – McGee 5–108–2
- KENT – Logan 4–21

=== Vanderbilt ===
Vanderbilt (3–6–1) at #10 Tennessee (7–1–2)

Quarter	1	2	3	4	Total
Vanderbilt	0	0	0	0	0
Tennessee	10	17	3	0	30

at Neyland Stadium, Knoxville, Tennessee

- Date: November 30, 1985
- Game attendance: 97,372
- TV: TBS

Game information

1st Quarter

- TENN – Tim McGee 6-yard pass from Daryl Dickey (Carlos Reveiz kick)
- TENN – Reveiz 23-yard field goal

2nd Quarter

- TENN – Eric Swanson 43-yard pass from Dickey (Reveiz kick)
- TENN – Swanson 24-yard pass from Dickey (Reveiz kick)
- TENN – Reveiz 29-yard field goal

3rd Quarter

- TENN – Reveiz 24-yard field goal

=== vs. No. 2 Miami (Sugar Bowl) ===
Sugar Bowl: #2 Miami (10–1) vs. #8 Tennessee (8–1–2)

Quarter	1	2	3	4	Total
Miami	7	0	0	0	7
Tennessee	0	14	14	7	35

at Louisiana Superdome, New Orleans, Louisiana

- Date: January 1, 1986
- Game attendance: 77,432
- TV announcers (ABC): Keith Jackson (play-by-play), Frank Broyles (color), Tim Brant (sideline)

Game information

1st Quarter

- MIA – Michael Irvin 18-yard pass from Vinny Testaverde (Greg Cox kick)

2nd Quarter

- TENN – Jeff Smith 6-yard pass from Daryl Dickey (Carlos Reveiz kick)
- TENN – Tim McGee fumble recovery in end zone (Reveiz kick)

3rd Quarter

- TENN – Sam Henderson 1-yard run (Reveiz kick)
- TENN – Jeff Powell 60-yard run (Reveiz kick)

4th Quarter

- TENN – Charles Wilson 6-yard run (Reveiz kick)

Passing

- MIA – Testaverde 20/36, 217, 1 TD, 3 INT
- TENN – Dickey 15/25, 131, 1 TD, 1 INT

Rushing

- MIA – Williams 8–45
- TENN – Powell 11–104–1

Receiving

- MIA – Irvin 5–91–1; Perriman 5–41
- TENN – McGee 7–94

== End of season ==
=== Statistical leaders (regular season) ===
- Passing: Tony Robinson 91/143, 1246, 8 TD, 7 INT; Daryl Dickey 85/131, 1161, 10 TD, 1 INT; Jeff Francis 14/20, 172, 1 TD, 1 INT
- Receiving: Tim McGee 50–947–7; Joey Clinkscales 22–434–4; Jeff Smith 20–397; Eric Swanson 24–300–4
- Rushing: Keith Davis 141–684–2; Jeff Powell 55–235; Sam Henderson 53–175–2; Pete Panuska 39–196–3; Tony Robinson 44–201–1
- Tackles: Kelly Ziegler 101 (83 solo), Darrin Miller 94 (67), Dale Jones 82 (59), Tommy Sims 62 (42), Chris White 62 (34)
- Tackles for loss: Dale Jones 9
- Sacks: Mark Hovanic 8, Dale Jones 5, Richard Cooper 5
- Interceptions: Chris White 9, Charles Davis 3
- Passes broken-up: Andre Creamer 6, Tommy Sims 5, Richard Cooper 5
- Forced fumbles: Dale Jones 5, Darrin Miller 4
- Fumbles recovered: Chris White 3
- Kicking: Carlos Reveiz 24/28 field goals, 30/30 PAT
- Punting: Bob Garmon 39.1 yards/punt
- ^{Source:}

=== Honors ===
- Tim McGee (WR): First-team All-American, All-SEC
- Chris White (DB): First-team All-American, All-SEC
- Dale Jones (LB): All-SEC
- Carlos Reveiz (PK): All-SEC
- Bruce Wilkerson (OL): All-SEC
- Daryl Dickey (QB): Sugar Bowl Most Valuable Player
- Troy Hale (WR): Academic All-SEC
- Randy Sanders (QB): Academic All-SEC
- Johnny Majors (HC): SEC Coach of the Year
- Ken Donahue (DC): SEC Assistant Coach of the Year
- ^{Source:}

=== New school records ===
- Most passing yards in a game: 387, Tony Robinson (vs. UCLA)
- Most touchdown passes in a game: 4 (tie), Tony Robinson (vs. Auburn)
- Most interceptions in a game: 3 (tie), Chris White (vs. UCLA)^{*}
- Consecutive passes without an interception: 106, Daryl Dickey
- Highest single-season completion percentage (min. 100 attempts): 64.9%, Daryl Dickey^{*}
- Highest career completion percentage (min. 100 attempts): 63%, Daryl Dickey (1981–1985)^{*}
- Lowest career interception percentage: 1.2%, Daryl Dickey (1981–1985)
- Most single-season receiving yards: 947, Tim McGee
- Most single-season touchdown receptions: 7 (tie), Tim McGee
- Most career receptions: 123, Tim McGee (1982–1985)
- Most career receiving yards: 2,042, Tim McGee (1982–1985)
- Most career touchdown receptions: 16, Tim McGee (1982–1985)
- Most single-season points by kicking: 102, Carlos Reveiz
- Fewest team fumbles lost: 5
- ^{* Indicates record still stands as of the 2012 season}
- ^{Source:}

== Team players drafted into the NFL ==
Player	Position	Round	Pick	NFL club
Tim McGee	Wide receiver	1	21	Cincinnati Bengals
Jeff Powell	Running back	6	166	Chicago Bears
Eric Swanson	Wide receiver	7	170	St. Louis Cardinals
Tommy Sims	Defensive back	7	190	Indianapolis Colts
David Douglas	Guard	8	204	Cincinnati Bengals
