= Terry McDaniel =

American football player (born 1965)

No. 36
- Position: Cornerback

Personal information
- Born: February 8, 1965 (age 61); Mansfield, Ohio, U.S.
- Listed height: 5 ft 10 in (1.78 m)
- Listed weight: 180 lb (82 kg)

Career information
- High school: Saginaw (Saginaw, Michigan)
- College: Tennessee
- NFL draft: 1988: 1st round, 9th overall pick

Career history
- Los Angeles / Oakland Raiders (1988–1997); Green Bay Packers (1998)*; Seattle Seahawks (1998)
- * Offseason or practice squad member only

Awards and highlights
- First-team All-Pro (1993); 3× Second-team All-Pro (1992, 1994, 1995); 5× Pro Bowl (1992–1996); First-team All-SEC (1987)

Career NFL statistics
- Tackles: 502
- Interceptions: 35
- Total touchdowns: 8
- Forced fumbles: 5
- Stats at Pro Football Reference

Terence Lee McDaniel (born February 8, 1965) is an American former professional football player who was a cornerback for 11 seasons in the National Football League (NFL), mostly with the Los Angeles/Oakland Raiders. He played college football for the Tennessee Volunteers football, and was selected in the first round of the 1988 NFL draft with the ninth overall pick.

A five-time Pro Bowl selection from 1992 to 1996, McDaniel had 35 career interceptions for 667 yards and 6 touchdowns. His five interceptions returned for touchdowns over his career with the Raiders are a team record. His 34 interceptions are the third-highest in franchise history, and his 624 return yards are the second-highest.

== Early life ==
A native of Mansfield, Ohio, McDaniel attended Saginaw High School in Saginaw, Michigan, where he played football and ran track. In football, he played both wide receiver and running back. As a senior, he accumulated 1,582 yards of total offense, and was named to the all-conference team. In track, he won Michigan state titles in the 100-meter and 200-meter dashes, with personal bests of 10.46 and 21.20, respectively.

== College career ==
McDaniel signed with the University of Tennessee in 1983 to play football and run track. Initially a wide receiver, he redshirted during his first year. During the 1984 season, he appeared in every game except the season opener, caught one pass for 19 yards, and returned 5 kickoffs for a total of 59 yards. He had 3 tackles as part of the kickoff return coverage unit.

Just before the start of the 1985 season, McDaniel switched to cornerback. Working with defensive backs coach Ron Zook, he received considerable playing time early in the season due to injuries to starters. In Tennessee's 31–29 win over Wake Forest, he had an interception and recovered a fumble. In the first quarter of Tennessee's 30–0 shutout of Vanderbilt on November 30, Commodore tailback Carl Woods broke loose and ran 65 yards for what would have been a touchdown, but was chased down and tackled by McDaniel at the Tennessee 15-yard line. McDaniel had 3 tackles and an interception in Tennessee's 35–7 victory over Miami in the 1986 Sugar Bowl. He finished the season with 18 tackles, 13 of which were solo tackles.

By the 1986 season, McDaniel was in the starting lineup. In Tennessee's 27–23 loss to Mississippi State, he broke up three passes. In Tennessee's loss to Auburn, McDaniel registered a team-leading 13 tackles, including one in which he chased down running back Brent Fullwood to prevent what would have been a 96-yard touchdown run. He had an interception in each of Tennessee's last three games against Ole Miss, Kentucky and Vanderbilt. He finished the season with 68 tackles (45 solo) and 3 interceptions.

During his senior season in 1987, McDaniel registered 57 tackles (38 solo), 2 interceptions and a team-leading 8 broken-up passes. In the Vols' win over Mississippi State, McDaniel prevented another long touchdown run when he chased down and stopped Bulldog running back Hank Phillips at the Tennessee 15-yard line. His hit on Phillips jarred the ball loose, and it was recovered by Vol linebacker Darrin Miller. He was named All-SEC and 2nd-team All-American. He also received Academic All-SEC honors. His career totals at Tennessee included 146 tackles (97 solo), 11 passes broken up, and 6 interceptions.

As a member of the Tennessee track team, McDaniel, along with Jeff Powell, Sam Graddy and Allen Franklin, captured the SEC Championship in the 4 x 100-meter relay in 1985. He also set school records in the 300-meter and 300-yard dashes.

== Professional career ==
Following the 1987 season, McDaniel was considered one of the nation's top players in man-to-man coverage, and was ranked the number two cornerback by The Sporting News. He was selected by the Los Angeles Raiders in first round (ninth overall pick) of the 1988 NFL draft. He missed most of his rookie year with a broken leg, but saw extensive play in the following nine seasons with the Raiders, initially in Los Angeles and later in Oakland.

His five interceptions returned for touchdowns over his career with the Raiders are a team record. His 34 interceptions are the third-highest in franchise history, and his 624 return yards are the second-highest. He was selected for the Pro Bowl five times, every year from 1992 to 1996.

McDaniel's best season statistically was the 1994 season, in which he had seven interceptions. In the Raiders' 48–16 win over Denver on September 18, 1994, McDaniel intercepted a pass from John Elway and returned it 15 yards for a touchdown. In the team's 21–17 win over New England on October 9, 1994, McDaniel intercepted three passes from Patriots quarterback Drew Bledsoe, one of which he returned for a touchdown, and one of which set up the go-ahead touchdown.

McDaniel missed three games during the 1997 season due to a knee injury, and was released by the Raiders prior to the 1998 season. He played his final NFL season that year as a member of the Seattle Seahawks. His career statistics include 35 interceptions for 667 yards and six touchdowns. His longest interception returned for a touchdown was 56 yards, which took place in the Raiders' loss to Minnesota on November 17, 1996. In a game against Denver on November 22, 1992, he intercepted two passes by Tommy Maddox, and returned each for a career-long 67 yards (134 total return yards).

== NFL career statistics ==
Year	Team	GP	Int	Yards	TD	Sacks	FF
1988	LA	2	0	0	0	0.0	0
1989	LA	16	3	21	0	1.0	0
1990	LA	16	3	20	0	2.0	0
1991	LA	16	0	0	0	0.0	0
1992	LA	16	4	180	0	0.0	0
1993	LA	16	5	87	1	0.0	0
1994	LA	16	7	103	2	0.0	0
1995	OAK	16	6	46	1	0.0	0
1996	OAK	16	5	150	1	0.0	0
1997	OAK	13	1	17	0	0.0	0
1998	SEA	9	1	43	1	0.0	0
Career		152	35	667	6	3.0	0

== Post-playing career ==
After his final season in the NFL, McDaniel returned to Knoxville, Tennessee, with his wife and children. He has since become active in the city's Children of God Ministries church. McDaniel's son, Isaiah, joined the Tennessee squad as a preferred walk-on in 2014.
