= John Bruhin =

American football player (1964–2022)

No. 69
- Position: Guard

Personal information
- Born: December 9, 1964; Knoxville, Tennessee, U.S.
- Died: March 31, 2022 (aged 57)
- Listed height: 6 ft 3 in (1.91 m)
- Listed weight: 280 lb (127 kg)

Career information
- High school: Powell (Powell, Tennessee)
- College: Tennessee
- NFL draft: 1988: 4th round, 86th overall pick

Career history
- Tampa Bay Buccaneers (1988–1991); Philadelphia Eagles (1992)*; New York Jets (1993)
- * Offseason or practice squad member only

Career NFL statistics
- Games played: 49
- Games started: 21
- Stats at Pro Football Reference

John Glenn Bruhin (December 9, 1964 – March 31, 2022) was an American professional football guard who played four seasons with the Tampa Bay Buccaneers of the National Football League (NFL). Bruhin was selected by the Tampa Bay Buccaneers in the fourth round of the 1988 NFL draft. He played college football at the University of Tennessee.

== Early life ==
John Glenn Bruhin was born on December 9, 1964, in Knoxville, Tennessee. He played high school football at Powell High School in Powell, Tennessee.

== College career ==
After redshirting in 1983 at Tennessee, Bruhin spent most of the 1984 season as a reserve behind All-American Bill Mayo. By the 1985 season, he was a starter on a line that featured future NFL players Bruce Wilkerson, Harry Galbreath, and David Douglas, and delivered a "stellar blocking performance" in the 1986 Sugar Bowl. In spite of a knee injury, he appeared in 11 games in 1986, and played in all 12 games in 1987.

== Professional career ==
Bruhin appeared in all sixteen games for Tampa Bay during his rookie season in 1988. He had worked his way into the starting lineup by 1989, but suffered a knee injury in the seventh game of the season, and missed several games. He started several games for the Bucs during the 1990 season, alternating at left guard with Tom McHale. He continued alternating the starting spot with right guard Ian Beckles and Tom McHale during the 1991 season. Bruhin signed with the Philadelphia Eagles in March 1992, but was waived just before the start of the season. He died on March 31, 2022, at the age of 57.
