= Tony Robinson (American football) =

American football player (born 1964)

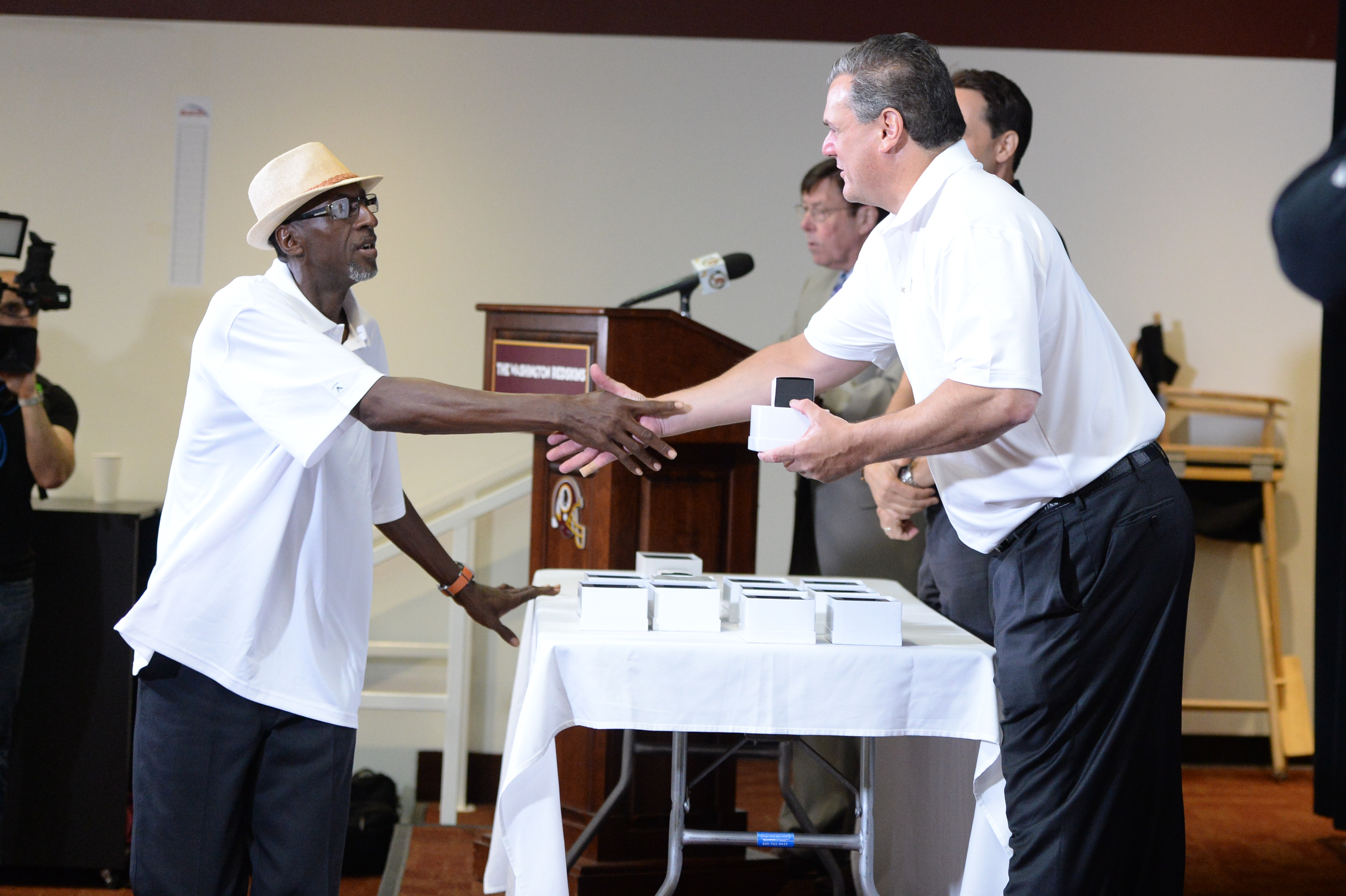
- Robinson (left) receiving his Super Bowl ring at a ceremony held in 2018

No. 15, 10
- Position: Quarterback

Personal information
- Born: January 22, 1964 (age 62); Monticello, Florida, U.S.
- Listed height: 6 ft 3 in (1.91 m)
- Listed weight: 200 lb (91 kg)

Career information
- High school: Leon (Tallahassee, Florida)
- College: Tennessee
- NFL draft: 1986: undrafted

Career history
- Washington Redskins (1987)

Awards and highlights
- First-team All-SEC (1984)

Career NFL statistics
- Games played: 1
- TD–INT: 0–2
- Passing yards: 152
- Passer rating: 48.6
- Stats at Pro Football Reference

Kevin Altona "Tony" Robinson (born January 22, 1964) is an American former professional football player who was a quarterback who played in the National Football League (NFL) for the Super Bowl-winning Washington Redskins as a replacement member of their team during the 1987 players' strike. Along with other Redskins replacement players from that year, he was eventually awarded a Super Bowl ring.

Robinson played college football for the Tennessee Volunteers from 1982 to 1985. After spending his first two seasons as a backup, he guided the 1984 squad to a 7–4–1 record and an appearance in the Sun Bowl. He led the 1985 "Sugar Vols" squad through a difficult first half of the season, and was a Heisman Trophy candidate until blowing out his right knee during a close game against Alabama. A few weeks after the season, he was arrested in Knoxville on charges of distributing cocaine, critically damaging his prospects in the NFL. He went undrafted in the 1986 NFL draft.

In 1987, during the strike, Robinson played in one game for the Redskins after starting replacement quarterback Ed Rubbert was injured. He led the Redskins' replacement players to an improbable 13–7 win over a Dallas Cowboys team that featured a number of players who had crossed the picket lines during the strike. His role was loosely portrayed by both Keanu Reeves and Michael Jace in the 2000 film The Replacements.

== Early life ==
Robinson was born in Monticello, Florida, the son of Johnnie Robinson, a truck driver, and his wife, Jean. He grew up in Tallahassee, where he played football with neighborhood kids from a very young age. He played high school football at Tallahassee's Leon High School under heralded coach Gene Cox. He joined Leon's junior varsity squad as a freshman in 1978, initially playing at wide receiver, but switching to quarterback when Cox noticed how easily he could throw the ball long distances.

Robinson was named Leon's starting quarterback during his sophomore season. The decision was controversial, not only because Robinson was an underclassman, but because he was black. Cox, who had sent a string of quarterbacks to the college ranks, brushed off the criticism, stating, "I've always believed in playing the best player," and that Robinson was "unquestionably the best."

During his three years as Leon's starting quarterback, Robinson completed 378 of 676 passes for 6,581 yards and 75 touchdowns, and was one of the few high school quarterbacks at the time to throw for more than 2,000 yards in three consecutive seasons. With Robinson as the starter, Leon lost just four times in 33 games. During his senior season, Robinson completed 155 of 261 passes for 2,354 yards and 24 touchdowns, leading Leon to an undefeated regular season. He won "Florida Player of the Year" accolades, and was named to the Parade All-American team.

== College career ==
Robinson had initially hoped to play for Florida State, which was located just a few miles from Leon High School, and had taken several Leon players in the past. Florida State, however, showed little interest in Robinson until late in his recruitment. His high school coach, Gene Cox, suggested it was because of Robinson's race, noting that Florida State had never had a black quarterback. Florida State head coach Bobby Bowden denied this, however, stating that he was concerned with Robinson's relatively skinny frame (he was listed at 6'4", 170 pounds, coming out of high school). "I really didn't think he could take the pounding," Bowden said.

Robinson eventually signed with Tennessee. Volunteers head coach Johnny Majors had also waffled on Robinson's recruitment, expressing concern over a roster already packed with quarterbacks, but made up his mind at the last minute and offered Robinson a scholarship. Robinson joined Tennessee's stellar 1982 recruiting class, which included future NFL players Tim McGee, Joey Clinkscales, Charles Davis, Bruce Wilkerson, and Daryle Smith.

Tennessee had signed multiple quarterbacks in 1982. After a few practices, however, most realized they would not win the starting job over Robinson. Several, including Clinkscales and Davis, found new positions, while others left the team. During his freshman year, Robinson was a backup to star quarterback Alan Cockrell, and played very little. He led Tennessee's junior varsity team to a 3–1 record, however, completing 15 of 29 passes for 412 yards and seven touchdowns, and rushing for 109 yards. Robinson remained a backup to Cockrell during the 1983 season. He received his only significant playing time in Tennessee's 37–3 win over Georgia Tech, completing 6 of 12 passes for 123 yards and a 35-yard touchdown.

=== 1984 season ===
Disappointed over lack of playing time, Robinson contemplated leaving the team. He was suddenly vaulted into the starting slot, however, when Cockrell decided to skip his senior year to play Major League Baseball.

Robinson performed reasonably well in season-opening wins over Washington State and Utah, though star running back Johnnie Jones shouldered much of the offensive burden. After suffering a leg injury, Robinson missed all of Tennessee's game against Army (allowing quarterback Daryl Dickey to get his first start), and struggled in the Vols' 29–10 loss to Auburn.

Robinson's breakout performance came in Tennessee's shootout against rival Florida on October 13, 1984. He completed a school-record 29 passes for 371 yards, including a 52-yard touchdown pass to Tim McGee in the first quarter, and a 48-yard touchdown pass to Joey Clinkscales that pulled the Vols to within a score in the fourth quarter. He also had 18 yards rushing, giving him 389 yards of total offense, which was also a school record. Tennessee's defense was unable to stop Florida's running back tandem of Neal Anderson and John L. Williams, however, and the Gators prevailed 43–30.

Robinson delivered another strong performance in Tennessee's game against rival Alabama on October 20, 1984. With Alabama leading 27–13 midway through the fourth quarter, Robinson engineered a scoring drive which culminated with a 17-yard touchdown pass to McGee. Teammate Andre Creamer then returned a punt to the Alabama 11-yard line, and Jones scored from a yard out a few plays later to cut the lead to 27–26 with just over two minutes remaining. Majors opted to go for the two-point conversion, which Robinson scored by faking a pitch to Jones and diving over the goal line, giving Tennessee a 28–27 victory, and setting off a wild celebration at Neyland Stadium. Robinson was named "Southeast Back of the Week" by the Associated Press for his performance.

In Tennessee's 24–21 win over Georgia Tech on October 27, Robinson completed 20 of 26 passes for 233 yards and a touchdown, and connected with tight end Jeff Smith on a 31-yard, fourth-down pass late in the fourth quarter to set up Fuad Reveiz's game-winning field goal. In the Vols' 41–9 win over Memphis State two weeks later, Robinson threw three touchdown passes, including a 34-yarder to McGee and a 24-yarder to Smith, and scored on a 25-yard run. In Tennessee's 17–12 loss to Kentucky — the Volunteers' last loss to the Wildcats until 2011 — Robinson engineered a drive to the Kentucky 13-yard line late the fourth quarter, but time expired as he was trying to down the ball. Robinson threw touchdown passes of 55 yards and 19 yards to McGee to lead Tennessee to a 29–13 win over rival Vanderbilt to finish the regular season. In the 1984 Sun Bowl, with Tennessee down 28–27, Robinson led a late drive into Maryland territory, but lost the ball on a fumble, allowing the Terrapins to escape with the win.

Robinson finished the 1984 season with 153 completions on 256 passes for 1,963 yards, 14 touchdowns, and 9 interceptions, falling just short of Alan Cockrell's school single-season record of 2,021 passing yards. He also rushed for 126 yards and 3 touchdowns, giving him a school-record 2,089 yards of total offense. His 61.7% completion rate also set a record, surpassing Johnny Majors' 1956 mark of 61.3%.

=== 1985 season ===
Robinson was named Preseason All-SEC prior to the 1985 season. He was also considered a contender for the Heisman Trophy. In Tennessee's season opener against 10th-ranked UCLA, he threw for a school record 387 yards and two touchdowns, including a 68-yard bomb to Clinkscales, and rushed for 30 yards, giving him 417 total yards to break his own school record for total offense. The Bruins rallied to score 16 points late in the fourth quarter, however, to escape with a 26–26 tie.

On September 28, 1985, Tennessee hosted #1 Auburn, which featured eventual Heisman winner Bo Jackson at running back. On Tennessee's first drive, Robinson broke loose for a 39-yard scramble to set up the Vols' first score. Following an Auburn turnover, Robinson connected with McGee for a 37-yard touchdown. In the second quarter, Robinson engineered a third scoring drive, capped by an off-balance touchdown pass to Vince Carter. When Auburn cut the lead to 24–6 in the fourth quarter, Robinson led the Vols downfield on another scoring drive, which featured a long pass to McGee and a touchdown pass to Clinkscales. After Auburn scored again, Robinson responded with a 30-yard touchdown pass to Eric Swanson, and the Vols held on for a 38–20 win. Robinson finished with 259 yards passing and a school-record four touchdown passes. Having upstaged Jackson, Robinson was featured on the cover of the October 7, 1985, edition of Sports Illustrated under the caption, "The Tennessee Waltz: Tony Robinson Buries Auburn."

After a hard-fought victory over Wake Forest, Tennessee traveled to Gainesville to face #7 Florida, who had not lost since the first week of the 1984 season. Robinson completed 26 of 36 passes for 300 yards, but managed just one touchdown pass — a 20-yarder to McGee in the fourth quarter — the Florida defense successfully executed a "bend-but-don't-break" strategy. Late in the fourth quarter, with Tennessee trailing 17–10, Robinson led the Vols to midfield, but the drive ended when his pass was tipped by Florida defensive tackle Rhondy Weston and intercepted by linebacker Alonzo Johnson to seal the victory for the Gators.

On October 19, Tennessee traveled to Birmingham to play Alabama, who were ranked #15 and entered the game with a 4–1 record following a 19–17 loss to Penn State. Both offenses struggled to move the ball for most of the game, though Robinson and freshman running back Keith Davis had garnered enough offensive production to give Tennessee a 13–7 lead after three quarters. Following an Alabama turnover, Tennessee had driven inside the Alabama 10-yard line early in the fourth quarter. On a 2nd-and-1 scramble, Robinson was sandwiched between linebacker Cornelius Bennett and defensive lineman Curt Jarvis, tearing the anterior cruciate ligament in his knee. He recalled Bennett saying, "T-man, stay down, you're hurt. I can feel it." Though stunned with Robinson out of the game, Tennessee regrouped and held on for a 16–14 victory.

In the days following the Alabama game, doctors determined that Robinson's injury would require arthroscopic surgery, effectively ending his season. While many considered Tennessee's win over Alabama a pyrrhic victory with the loss of Robinson, the team would rally behind backup quarterback Daryl Dickey, going 6–0–1 in its final seven games to win the school's first SEC Championship in 16 years. Playing in just five games, four of which were against opponents ranked in the Top 20, Robinson completed 91 of 143 passes for 1,246 yards, 8 touchdowns and 7 interceptions.

=== Records ===
Robinson completed 253 of 411 passes for 3,332 yards, 23 touchdowns, and 17 interceptions, and rushed for 195 yards and four touchdowns, during his career at Tennessee. Although he started just 15 regular season games, his 3,527 yards of total offense remained the school's 14th-highest career total as of the 2012 season. Beginning with the 1984 Auburn game, Robinson threw a touchdown pass in 13 consecutive games, a record which stood until Heath Shuler threw touchdown passes in 18 consecutive games in the early 1990s.

Robinson's single-game record of 417 yards of total offense against UCLA in 1985 was broken by Peyton Manning, who accumulated 475 yards against Florida in 1996. Robinson's tally is now the school's fourth-highest single-game total. His 389 yards of total offense against Florida in 1984 remains the school's eighth-highest single-game total. His single-season record of 2,089 total yards was broken by Jeff Francis in 1988, and has since been surpassed several times.

=== Collegiate statistics ===
Year	School	Conf	Pos	Cmp	Att	Pct	Yds	Y/A	AY/A	TD	Int	Rate
1982	Tennessee	SEC	QB	0	3	0.0	0	0.0	0.0	0	0	0.0
1983	Tennessee	SEC	QB	6	12	50.0	123	10.3	8.2	1	1	146.9
1984	Tennessee	SEC	QB	156	253	61.7	1963	7.8	7.3	14	9	138.0
1985	Tennessee	SEC	QB	91	143	63.6	1246	8.7	7.6	8	7	145.5
Career	Tennessee			253	411	61.6	3332	8.1	7.4	23	17	13

== Professional career ==
According to Robinson's friends, he underwent a personality change after his injury. Many of his acquaintances recalled that he became more withdrawn. In a later interview, Robinson admitted he had started using cocaine in 1985. In January 1986, a few days after Tennessee's victory in the 1986 Sugar Bowl (which Robinson watched from the sidelines), he and his roommate, former Vol fullback Kenneth B.B. Cooper, were arrested by Knoxville police in a sting operation. Robinson was subsequently charged with taking part in the sale of 30 grams of cocaine. He eventually pleaded no contest to lesser charges, and was sentenced to nine months in prison.

His chances for an NFL career in shambles, Robinson received an offer to play for the Richmond Ravens of the Continental Interstate Football League. He was still serving his sentence at the time, but was freed temporarily by a judge. While he was playing for the Ravens in 1987, the NFL players went on strike, leaving team owners searching for replacement players. Robinson's coach with the Ravens was a friend of Washington Redskins coach Joe Gibbs, and recommended Robinson to Gibbs. Robinson signed with the Redskins in September 1987 as a backup to replacement quarterback Ed Rubbert.

With Rubbert at quarterback, the Redskins won their first two replacement games. In the third and final replacement game on October 19, 1987, the Redskins played their rival, the Dallas Cowboys in Dallas on Monday Night Football. While the Redskins were playing with a roster consisting entirely of replacement players, a number of Cowboys players had crossed the picket lines—among them Tony Dorsett, Ed "Too Tall" Jones, and Randy White—and thus few people thought the Redskins had much of a chance. In the first quarter, Robinson's former college teammate linebacker Dale Jones injured Rubbert's throwing shoulder with a tackle. Robinson entered the game, and helped lead Washington to a 13–7 upset, completing 11 of 18 passes for 152 yards and two interceptions, and was widely praised for his handling of the offense. The game has been called one of the greatest upsets in NFL history. Redskins announcer Frank Herzog said of Robinson: "He played a hell of game. He was the hero."

== Personal life ==
Robinson was cut after the strike, and returned to finish out the season with the Richmond Ravens. After the season, he returned to Tennessee to complete his sentence. In February 1988, his agent said he was close to signing with an NFL team, but this never materialized. In 1989, he was arrested for parole violation charges. He joined the Virginia Storm of the Minor League Football System later that year. In 1991, however, he was arrested and convicted of forging stolen checks, and was sentenced to two years in prison. After his release in 1993, he returned to Tallahassee.

The Replacements, a Howard Deutch comedy inspired by the Redskins' 1987 replacement run, premiered in 2000. The main character, Shane Falco (portrayed by Keanu Reeves), was loosely based on Robinson. The casting of a white actor to play a character inspired by a black athlete generated controversy. A group of Howard University students led by Fred Outten protested the film's opening at the United Artists' theater in Bethesda, Maryland. Responding to the controversy in a subsequent interview, Robinson merely stated that he "didn't read much into" being portrayed by a white actor.

For more than a decade after his return to Tallahassee, Robinson struggled with drug use, racking up twenty-five misdemeanor charges, most of them related to drug possession. His last charge came in 2006. In a 2012 interview, he said his days of drug use were over. He noted he remained close to his brothers, Frederick and Broderick, and had started coaching Pee-Wee football.

Josh Cody, a son of Robinson, played defensive end for UT Martin. Cody was with the Skyhawks when they played Tennessee at Neyland Stadium in 2010.

On October 19, 2013, Robinson returned to Neyland Stadium for the first time since 1985 for Tennessee's game against South Carolina. The move was part of an effort by first-year head coach Butch Jones and Vol for Life Coordinator Antone Davis to reach out to former players. Robinson ran through the "T" alongside former coach Johnny Majors. On November 9, Robinson was honored as a Vol "Legend of the Game" during Tennessee's game against Auburn. On April 12, 2014, Robinson played in the "Vol for Life" flag football game at halftime of Tennessee's annual Orange and White Game. He threw a touchdown pass, and was awarded the game's 13.9-foot (4.2 m) MVP trophy.
