= Dale Jones (American football) =

American football player and coach (born 1963)

No. 51
- Position: Linebacker

Personal information
- Born: March 8, 1963 (age 63); Lee County, Virginia, U.S.
- Listed height: 6 ft 1 in (1.85 m)
- Listed weight: 234 lb (106 kg)

Career information
- High school: Bradley Central (TN)
- College: Tennessee
- NFL draft: 1987: 10th round, 262nd overall pick

Career history

Playing
- Dallas Cowboys (1987)*; Houston Oilers (1987)*; Dallas Cowboys (1987)
- * Offseason or practice squad member only

Coaching
- Tennessee (1989) Graduate assistant; Parma Panthers (1990) Defensive coordinator; Florida (1991) Assistant coach; Georgia Military (1991) Linebackers coach & defensive backs coach; Georgia Military (1992–1995) Defensive coordinator, linebackers coach, & defensive backs coach; Appalachian State (1996–2004) Special teams coordinator & defensive line coach; Appalachian State (2005–2009) Linebackers coach; Appalachian State (2010–2012) Defensive coordinator & linebackers coach; Appalachian State (2013) Defensive line coach; Appalachian State (2014–2018) Linebackers coach; Louisville (2019) Linebackers coach; Appalachian State (2020–2022) Defensive coordinator & inside linebackers coach

Awards and highlights
- First-team All-SEC (1985); Second-team All-SEC (1986)

Career NFL statistics
- Fumble recoveries: 2
- Stats at Pro Football Reference

Marvin Dale Jones (born March 8, 1963) is an American football coach and former player. He was most recently the defensive coordinator for Appalachian State. He served in various capacities for Appalachian State (1996–2022), including three years as defensive coordinator (2010–2012). Jones previously worked as a defensive coordinator for Georgia Military College (1992–1996) and the Parma Panthers (1990) of the Italian Football League (IFL).

Jones played linebacker at the University of Tennessee, where he was a member of the 1985 "Sugar Vols" squad, and was a captain of the 1986 team. He was drafted by the Dallas Cowboys in the 10th round of the 1987 NFL draft, and played during the 1987 NFL strike as a replacement player.

== Early life ==
Jones was born in Lee County, Virginia, the second from the youngest of 13 children. After his family moved to Cleveland, Tennessee he attended Bradley Central High School, where he was twice named All-State at defensive end. However, college recruiters had questions over his size (he weighed less than 180 pounds his senior year). For a whole summer, he would work all day on a farm in his hometown and then run six miles home at night.

He turned down a scholarship from Tennessee State University and instead chose to spend a year at the Tennessee Military Institute— a prep school— while gaining extra weight and muscle mass. Working with long-time coach Bill Dupes, Jones led the TMI squad in tackles in 1981, and was a team captain. He also gained nearly 30 pounds.

== College career ==
Jones's performance at TMI caught the attention of University of Tennessee coaches, and he was finally offered a scholarship. He was injured prior to the 1982 season, however, and redshirted.

=== 1983 season ===
He began the 1983 season as the third-string right outside linebacker, but still received playing time due to injuries to the Vols' starting linebackers. He had 6 tackles in the opener against Pittsburgh, and had two tackles-for-loss in the team's 41–34 victory over Alabama.

He led all players with 14 tackles in Tennessee's 30–23 victory over Maryland in the 1983 Florida Citrus Bowl. He finished the season with 77 tackles (43 solo), 2 sacks and 7 tackles-for-loss. He registered 11 "big plays," second only to teammate Reggie White's phenomenal 29. He was named to the Freshman All-American team by The Football News.

=== 1984 season ===
As part of a linebacker corps that included future NFL players Reggie McKenzie, Alvin Toles and Carl Zander, Jones opened the 1984 season with 12 tackles in Tennessee's 34–27 win over Washington State. In the Vols' loss to Auburn, Jones stuffed running back Brent Fullwood at the one-yard line, causing a fumble and preventing a touchdown.

He had 13 tackles in Tennessee's 28–27 win over Alabama. He finished the season as the team's leader in "big plays," with 4 sacks, 4 forced fumbles (led the team), and 7 tackles-for-loss. His 109 total tackles was second only to Zander's 167. He was named to the Sophomore All-American team by The Football News.

=== 1985 season ===
Jones is frequently recalled as the "emotional leader" of the 1985 "Sugar Vols" squad. In Tennessee's 38–20 upset of #1 Auburn on September 28, Jones led a swarming defense that held eventual Heisman Trophy winner Bo Jackson to 80 yards on 17 carries (Jackson entered the game averaging over 200 yards per game for the season). Following the team's 17–10 loss to Florida on October 12, Jones rallied the team with a locker room speech in which he declared, "This is the only game we're going to lose all year."

The biggest play of Jones's career came in Tennessee's win over Alabama, which took place at Legion Field on October 19. After Tennessee's star quarterback Tony Robinson left the game with an injury, Alabama seized the momentum and scored a touchdown to cut the lead to 16–14, and had driven into Tennessee territory for what would have been the go-ahead score, when Jones tipped a pass from quarterback Mike Shula and caught it as he fell to the ground for a drive-killing interception. Jones also recovered a fumble late in the 3rd quarter that set up Tennessee's third field goal.

In Tennessee's 6–6 tie against Georgia Tech on October 26, Jones batted away a 3rd-down pass by John Dewberry to force the Yellow Jackets to settle for a field goal early in the first quarter, and was named "SEC Lineman of the Week" for his overall performance. In the Vols' 34–14 win over Ole Miss, Jones had two third-quarter sacks, both of which forced Ole Miss to punt from their own end zone.

In Tennessee's upset of Miami in the 1986 Sugar Bowl, Jones had 7 tackles as a part of a defensive effort that held the Hurricanes' high-scoring offense to just 7 points. Jones sacked Miami quarterback Vinny Testaverde twice for -38 yards, including a crucial sack late in the second quarter that forced Miami to settle for a long, unsuccessful field goal attempt.

Jones finished the 1985 season with 82 tackles (59 solo), 5 sacks, 9 tackles-for-loss, 5 forced fumbles, and 4 pass deflections as the Vols finished 9–1–2. He was named All-SEC, 3rd-team All-American and SEC defensive lineman of the year honors from the Atlanta Touchdown Club.

=== 1986 season ===
Jones was a tri-captain of Tennessee's 1986 squad, and was named to Playboy's preseason All-American team. The Vols struggled to a 2–5 start before winning their final four games to secure a winning season. Jones had 11 tackles (2 for minus yardage) and a fumble recovery in Tennessee's 21–14 victory over Minnesota in the 1986 Liberty Bowl, and was named the game's "Outstanding Defensive Player."

Jones finished the 1986 season with 88 tackles (53 solo), 4.5 sacks, and 2 tackles-for-loss. He was again named All-SEC, and received All-American honorable mention by the Associated Press.

=== Records and legacy ===
During his four years at Tennessee, Jones amassed 349 total tackles (233 solo), 14.5 sacks, 24 tackles-for-loss, and 11 forced fumbles. As of the 2012 season, he was tied with Rico McCoy for 9th place on the school's career tackles list. He is tied with Keith DeLong for seventh place in career solo tackles, and is fourth in tackles-for-loss behind Leonard Little, Reggie White and Eric Westmoreland. He is second in forced fumbles behind Andy Spiva, who had 14 from 1973 to 1976.

Tennessee coach Johnny Majors described Jones as "one of the greatest leaders I ever had." He stated that Jones "personifies what college football is all about to the highest degree," and noted, "I have never seen a young man in my life that it meant more to play for one particular school than it does for Dale Jones to play at Tennessee."

Jones remains one of the best-known former Tennessee defenders, achieving what Knoxville News Sentinel reporter Mike Strange describes as "folk-hero status" among Vol fans. In a 2005 article, reporter John Painter wrote, "Mention Dale Jones is making an appearance in Knoxville and chances are it would resemble 'Jimmy Buffett Night' in Key West. Gonna draw a crowd."

He was honored as a Vol "Legend of the Game" during Tennessee's game against Alabama on October 25, 2014.

== Professional career ==
Jones was selected by the Dallas Cowboys in the 10th round (262nd overall) of the 1987 NFL draft. He was waived on September 1. On September 2, he was claimed off waivers by the Houston Oilers. He was released on September 6.

After the players went on a strike on the third week of the season, those games were canceled (reducing the 16-game season to 15) and the NFL decided that the games would be played with replacement players. In September, he was re-signed to be a part of the Cowboys replacement team, that was given the mock name "Rhinestone Cowboys" by the media and started in three games at left outside linebacker. Against the New York Jets on October 4, he posted 6 tackles and one fumble recovery. In the win over the Philadelphia Eagles on October 11, he recovered a fumble and returned it 26 yards to the 1-yard line. In the game against the Washington Redskins on October 19, a hit by Jones knocked Redskins quarterback Ed Rubbert out of the game in the first quarter, ironically, this allowed Jones's former college teammate, backup quarterback Tony Robinson, to enter the game and lead the Redskins to a 13–7 upset victory. He was again released after the strike ended on October 26.

== Coaching career ==
Jones returned to Tennessee as a graduate assistant in 1989. The following year, he was hired as defensive coordinator of the Italian Football League Parma Panthers, joining former high school, college teammate and Tennessee All American Chris White, who played 5 seasons in the Italian League. After a year with the Panthers, he joined the Florida Gators staff as an assistant in 1991. Later that year, he was hired as the linebackers and defensive backs coach at Georgia Military College, and was promoted to defensive coordinator in 1992.

In 1996, Jones was hired by Appalachian State head coach Jerry Moore as the Mountaineers' defensive line and special teams coach. In 2005, he switched to linebackers coach. He was elevated to defensive coordinator for the 2010 season, helping to engineer the Mountaineers' transition to a 3-4 defense. Following Moore's retirement in 2012, long-time Wofford assistant Nate Woody was hired as defensive coordinator as part of the new staff assembled by Moore's successor, Scott Satterfield. Jones returned to his earlier position of defensive line coach. Prior to the 2014 season, he switched to inside linebackers coach.

During Jones's initial tenure as defensive line coach, eight of his lineman moved on to play in the NFL, six received FCS All-American honors, and 15 were All-Southern Conference. Two, Josh Jeffries (2002) and K.T. Stovall (2003), received the Southern Conference Defensive Player of the Year award. Jones was named "Special Teams Coordinator of the Year" by American Football Monthly in 2002. Players Jones has worked with at Appalachian State who would go on to play in the NFL include Marques Murrell, D.J. Smith, Demetrius McCray, Jeremy Kimbrough and Jason Hunter. He also recruited punter Sam Martin.

On January 4, 2019, he followed head coach Scott Satterfield to the University of Louisville and was named the new inside linebackers coach.

On January 15, 2020, Appalachian State announced that Jones had agreed to return as defensive coordinator under new head coach Shawn Clark. Following the 2022 season, head coach Shawn Clark announced that Jones' contract wouldn't be renewed.
