= Ken Donahue =

American football player and coach (1925–2001)

Biographical details
- Born: February 28, 1925; Corryton, Tennessee, U.S.
- Died: March 21, 2001 (aged 76); Knoxville, Tennessee, U.S.

Playing career
- 1947–1950: Tennessee
- Position: Lineman

Coaching career (HC unless noted)
- 1951–1955: Memphis State (line)
- 1956–1960: Tennessee (assistant)
- 1961–1963: Mississippi State (assistant)
- 1964–1984: Alabama (assistant)
- 1985–1988: Tennessee (DC)

Ken Donahue (February 28, 1925 – March 21, 2001) was an American college football player and coach. He played at the University of Tennessee and served as an assistant coach at the University of Alabama under Bear Bryant. Donahue and four other men, Pat Dye, Bill Oliver, and Paul Bryant, created the multiple defense scheme that allowed the players to switch defenses quickly. The 4-3 and 5-2 schemes are still used by NCAA and NFL teams today. The scheme became popular because it allowed players to learn a minimum amount of technique, while allowing them to maximize the use of their strengths.

Following his tenure at Alabama, Donahue was hired as the defensive coordinator for Tennessee. He is best remembered for the 1985 season, when his defense held the Vols' final seven opponents to just four touchdowns, and provided a major catalyst for the team's 35–7 upset of Miami in the Sugar Bowl.

Donahue died on March 21, 2001, at the age of 76.
