= Tim McGee =

American football player (born 1964)

No. 88, 85
- Position: Wide receiver

Personal information
- Born: August 7, 1964 (age 62); Cleveland, Ohio, U.S.
- Listed height: 5 ft 10 in (1.78 m)
- Listed weight: 183 lb (83 kg)

Career information
- High school: John Hay (Cleveland)
- College: Tennessee
- NFL draft: 1986: 1st round, 21st overall pick

Career history
- Cincinnati Bengals (1986–1992); Washington Redskins (1993); Cincinnati Bengals (1994–1995)

Awards and highlights
- NFL kickoff return yards co-leader (1986); Consensus All-American (1985); First-team All-SEC (1985); Second-team All-SEC (1984)

Career NFL statistics
- Receptions: 321
- Receiving yards: 5,203
- Receiving touchdowns: 28
- Stats at Pro Football Reference

Timothy Dwayne Hatchett McGee (born August 7, 1964) is an American former professional football player who was a wide receiver in the National Football League (NFL) for the Cincinnati Bengals and Washington Redskins from 1986 to 1994. Before his NFL career, he played college football at the University of Tennessee, where he set school career records for receptions, receiving yards, and touchdown receptions, and was named an All American his senior year.

== Early life ==
McGee attended John Hay High School in Cleveland, Ohio, where he was taught the wide receiver position by Coach Sonny Harris. During his senior year, he caught 58 passes for 1,240 yards and 8 touchdowns, and was named to the Northeast Lakes All-District team. He was a teammate of future NBA player Charles Oakley, who played defensive end on the football team.

== College career ==
McGee was recruited to Tennessee by fellow John Hay alumnus Anthony Hancock, who had been a star receiver at UT, and was a first-round draft pick in 1982. McGee played in an era when Tennessee garnered a reputation as "Wide Receiver U." Seven of McGee's teammates– Willie Gault, Mike Miller, Clyde Duncan, Darryal Wilson, Lenny Taylor, Eric Swanson and Joey Clinkscales– would become NFL Draft picks, with Gault and Duncan going in the first round. In spite of playing in such a stacked receiving corps, McGee caught 123 passes for 2,042 yards and 15 touchdowns during his career, all of which were school records.

Buried in the depth chart behind veterans Gault and Miller, McGee played little during the 1982 season. He quickly picked up Tennessee's offensive scheme, however, and after a strong spring practice in 1983, had worked his way into the starting rotation alongside Duncan and Taylor. He caught 19 passes for 286 yards and 2 touchdowns for the year, and returned 21 punts for 192 yards. He caught 3 passes for 70 yards, including a 30-yard touchdown, in the Vols' 37–14 loss to Auburn, and was named the team's "Offensive Player of the Game." He also caught 4 passes in Tennessee's 41–34 win over Alabama, six passes in the team's 13–10 loss to Ole Miss, and had a 78-yard touchdown catch against Vanderbilt.

McGee's break-out year came during the 1984 season, when he caught 54 passes for 809 yards and 6 touchdowns, breaking the school's single-season record of 51 receptions set by Larry Seivers in 1976, and coming just shy of Seivers' single-season record of 840 receiving yards. He caught 10 passes for 157 yards and a touchdown against Florida, and his 17-yard touchdown catch in the Vols' 28–27 win over Alabama helped ignite a late Tennessee comeback. He caught 10 passes for 190 yards and two touchdowns against Vanderbilt. He was named 2nd-team All-SEC for his efforts.

McGee was a captain of the memorable 1985 "Sugar Vols" squad, and was one of the leading returning offensive threats along with quarterback Tony Robinson (Robinson and McGee were featured on the cover of the team's 1985 Football Guide sitting in the cockpit of an airplane under the words, "Fly Tennessee"). McGee caught 5 passes for 142 yards in the opener against UCLA, and had 6 catches for 163 yards and a touchdown in the Vols' 38–20 upset of #1 Auburn. He caught 6 passes for 91 yards and scored the lone touchdown in the team's 17–10 loss to Florida. McGee had 105 receiving yards against Rutgers, 117 against Ole Miss, and 108 against Kentucky (including two touchdowns that launched a second-half rout).

McGee finished the 1985 regular season with 50 catches for 947 yards and 7 touchdowns, helping lead Tennessee to the SEC Championship. He led the SEC in receiving yards, and tied for first in number of catches. His 947 yards broke Seivers' single-season record, and his 7 touchdowns tied the school record for touchdown receptions (Austin Denney had 7 in 1966). He was a first team selection on the College Football All-America Team.

In the 1986 Sugar Bowl, McGee caught a game-leading 7 passes for 94 yards. He recovered a fumble by teammate Jeff Powell in the end zone for the team's second touchdown.

=== School records ===
McGee's record of 123 career receptions was broken by Thomas Woods, who caught 124 passes from 1986 to 1989, and has since been surpassed numerous times, leaving McGee at 9th place on the list. His record of 2,042 career receiving yards was broken by Joey Kent, who recorded 2,814 yards from 1993 to 1996, and has since been surpassed by Marcus Nash, Peerless Price, Robert Meachem, and Cedrick Wilson, leaving McGee in 6th place. His record of 15 career touchdown catches was broken by Alvin Harper, who caught 16 touchdown passes from 1987 to 1990. McGee is now 9th on the career touchdown receptions list.

McGee's single-season record of 54 catches, set in 1984, was broken by Thomas Woods, who caught 58 passes in 1988, and has since been surpassed multiple times. His single season record of 947 receiving yards, set in 1985, was broken by Kent, who had 1,055 yards in 1995. McGee's 1985 tally is now 9th on that list. McGee's 8 career games with at least 100 receiving yards remains tied with Price for third, with only Kent (15) and Nash (11) registering more.

== Professional career ==
After his college career, McGee was selected with the 21st overall pick in the first round of the 1986 NFL draft by the Cincinnati Bengals.

McGee was a major contributor in his eight seasons with the Bengals. In his rookie season, he tied for the NFL lead in kickoff return yards (1,007). In 1988, he caught 36 passes for 686 yards and six touchdowns, assisting the Bengals to a 12–4 record and a championship appearance in Super Bowl XXIII. In the Super Bowl, McGee caught two passes for 23 yards, including a key 18-yard reception that set up Cincinnati's first score of the game.

In 1989, McGee had his best NFL season, recording 65 receptions for 1,211 yards and eight touchdowns. In Week 11 of the 1989 season, he won AFC Offensive Player of the Week for his game with 11 receptions for 194 yards and a touchdown against Detroit. He continued to play for the Bengals until 1993, when he joined the Washington Redskins for one season. After that, he returned to the Bengals in 1994, and retired after the season ended.

In his nine NFL seasons McGee caught 321 passes for 5,203 yards and 28 touchdowns. He also rushed for 18 yards, returned three punts for 21 yards, and gained 1,249 yards on 58 kickoff returns.

=== Career statistics ===
Year	Team	Receiving							Rushing				
Year	Team	G	GS	Rec	Yds	Avg	Lng	TD	Att	Yds	Avg	Lng	TD
1986	Cin	16		16	276	17.3	51	1	4	10	2.5	8	0
1987	Cin	11		23	408	17.7	49	1	1	−10	−10	−10	0
1988	Cin	16		36	686	19.1	78	6					
1989	Cin	16		65	1211	18.6	74	8	2	36	18	25	0
1990	Cin	16		43	737	17.1	52	1					
1991	Cin	16	16	51	802	15.7	52	4					
1992	Cin	16	16	35	408	11.7	36	3					
1993	Was	13	12	39	500	12.8	54	3					
1994	Cin	14	1	13	175	13.5	25	1	1	−18	−18	−18	0
1995	Cin	0	0	0	0			0					

== Post-playing career ==
McGee became a sports agent, representing, among others, Peerless Price, Stacey Mack, and John Henderson. He founded and built Courts 4 Sports, a 53,000 square-foot sports complex in Mason, Ohio featuring several indoor basketball and multi-purpose courts and fields for both professional and amateur/youth athletes. He is currently owner-operator of Luxury Motor Sales, a wholesaler of new and used vehicles in Cincinnati.

In 2008, McGee was inducted into the Greater Cleveland Sports Hall of Fame.
