= Joey Clinkscales =

American football executive and former player (born 1964)

Profile
- Position: Wide receiver

Personal information
- Born: May 21, 1964 (age 62); Asheville, North Carolina, U.S.
- Listed height: 6 ft 0 in (1.83 m)
- Listed weight: 199 lb (90 kg)

Career information
- High school: Austin-East (Knoxville, Tennessee)
- College: Tennessee
- NFL draft: 1987: 9th round, 233rd overall pick

Career history

Playing
- Pittsburgh Steelers (1987–1988); Tampa Bay Buccaneers (1988); Indianapolis Colts (1989)*
- * Offseason or practice squad member only

Operations
- New York Jets (1994–2012); Oakland Raiders (2012–2018); Los Angeles Wildcats (2019–2020); Vegas Vipers (2022–2023)

Career NFL statistics
- Receptions: 13
- Receiving yards: 240
- Touchdowns: 1
- Stats at Pro Football Reference

William Joseph Clinkscales (born May 21, 1964) is an American professional football executive and former player who recently served as the director of player personnel for the Vegas Vipers of the XFL. Clinkscales was previously the director of player personnel for the Oakland Raiders of the National Football League (NFL). He has worked for the New York Jets from 1994 to 2012, rising to Vice President of College Scouting during his final four years with the team. A former wide receiver, he was selected by the Pittsburgh Steelers in the ninth round of the 1987 NFL draft. He played in the NFL for two seasons, initially with the Steelers, and then with the Tampa Bay Buccaneers.

Clinkscales played college football at the University of Tennessee, where he was a member of the 1985 "Sugar Vols" squad, and was a captain of the 1986 team.

== Early life ==
Clinkscales was born in Asheville, North Carolina. He attended Austin-East High School in Knoxville, Tennessee, where he was a teammate of future NFL players Reggie McKenzie and Raleigh McKenzie. A dual-threat quarterback, he passed for 1,059 yards and ran for 900 to win All-South and All-State honors during his senior season. He also played basketball, averaging 14 points and 6 assists per game. He was ranked the number two recruit in the state of Tennessee by the Knoxville News Sentinel.

== Playing career ==
=== College ===
Clinkscales played college football at the University of Tennessee from 1982 to 1986. He converted to wide receiver during his first year, deferring the quarterback position to highly talented fellow signee Tony Robinson. Clinkscales played during an era when Tennessee garnered a reputation as "Wide Receiver U." Five of Clinkscales's teammates in the Vol receiving corps— Anthony Hancock, Willie Gault, Clyde Duncan, Tim McGee, and Anthony Miller— would become first-round NFL draft picks. In spite of the stiff competition for playing time, Clinkscales caught 68 passes for 1,105 yards and 10 touchdowns during his college career.

While learning to play wide receiver, Clinkscales redshirted in 1982 and played sparingly in 1983. During the 1984 season, however, he worked his way into the starting lineup. Although he was twice injured and missed several games, he managed 9 catches for 160 yards and 3 touchdowns, leading the team in yards-per-catch with 17.8. In the Vols' 43–30 loss to Florida, Clinkscales made an athletic 48-yard touchdown catch in the 4th quarter to pull the team to within a score. He also had a 14-yard touchdown catch in the Vols' 29–10 loss to Auburn, and an 8-yard touchdown reception in the team's 28–27 win over Alabama.

During Tennessee's memorable 1985 season, Clinkscales caught 22 passes for 434 yards and 4 touchdowns. In the season opener against UCLA, he caught 4 passes for 106 yards, including a 68-yard touchdown that would be the 1985 team's longest play from scrimmage. He had a 10-yard touchdown catch in the 4th quarter of the Vols' 38–20 victory over Auburn, and his 9-yard touchdown catch in the 4th quarter against Wake Forest helped the Vols escape with a 31–29 win. In Tennessee's 17–10 loss to Florida, Clinkscales caught 7 passes for 101 yards, much of which came on a 65-yard reception that set up the Vols' only touchdown. He caught two short passes in Tennessee's 1986 Sugar Bowl victory, including a key third-down conversion on the Vols' first scoring drive.

Clinkscales was Tennessee's leading returning receiver for the 1986 season, and was named a team captain. Starting alongside rising star Anthony Miller, he registered a team-leading 37 catches for 511 yards and 3 touchdowns. He had seven catches in the opener against New Mexico, and caught 5 passes for 63 yards in the Vols' 14–13 loss to Georgia Tech. In a key game against Ole Miss late in the season, Clinkscales caught 6 passes for 92 yards, including a 38-yard touchdown reception in the 4th quarter that gave the Vols the lead. In Tennessee's 21–14 win over Minnesota in the 1986 Liberty Bowl, Clinkscales caught 7 passes for 72 yards and two touchdowns, including the go-ahead touchdown in the fourth quarter.

=== National Football League ===
Pre-draft measurables
Height	Weight	Arm length	Hand span	40-yard dash	10-yard split	20-yard split	20-yard shuttle	Vertical jump
6 ft 1 in (1.85 m)	193 lb (88 kg)	31 3/4 in (0.81 m)	9 3/4 in (0.25 m)	4.61 s	1.57 s	2.62 s	4.43 s	32.5 in (0.83 m)
All values from NFL Combine

==== Pittsburgh Steelers ====
Clinkscales was selected in the ninth round of the 1987 NFL draft by the Pittsburgh Steelers as the 233rd overall pick. One reason he was not selected earlier in the draft was his lack of speed, as his time of 4.55–4.65 seconds in the 40-yard dash was considered slow for an NFL receiver. Kippy Brown, Tennessee's wide receivers coach, stated, "Pittsburgh's got a steal." He dismissed concerns over Clinkscales' speed, arguing, "In a clutch situation, I'd take Clinkscales over anybody I've coached." Steelers offensive coordinator Tom Moore noted that Clinkscales had "a tremendous amount of quickness and concentration and ball judgment."

Although Clinkscales performed well in the Steelers' 1987 training camp, he fell behind after suffering a leg injury, and was cut after the first preseason game. He re-signed with the team during the players' strike that year, however. He delivered his best performance in the Steelers' game against Atlanta, which was played primarily with replacement players, catching six passes for 150 yards and a touchdown, and drawing praise from legendary Steelers coach Chuck Noll. One week later against the Rams, however, he had just one catch for 17 yards. After the strike had ended, he remained in the lineup as a reserve. Following an injury to veteran John Stallworth, Clinkscales received considerable playing time in the game against Cincinnati, catching 4 passes for 51 yards. He was waived by the Steelers in October 1988.

==== Tampa Bay Buccaneers ====
Clinkscales signed briefly with the Tampa Bay Buccaneers after leaving the Steelers, but was waived after just a few weeks. He signed as a free agent with Indianapolis and later with Cleveland, but was unable to make either roster.

== Executive career ==
Clinkscales initially worked for the Steelers as a part-time scout in the early 1990s, and joined the New York Jets in 1994 as a full-time scout. He was elevated to national scout for the Jets in 2002. In 2006, he was promoted to Director of College Scouting. Two years later, he was named Vice President of College Scouting. In late 2007, he was interviewed by Bill Parcells for the vacant Miami Dolphins general manager position. In 2012, he was among the candidates interviewed for the St. Louis Rams general manager position.

In May 2012, the Oakland Raiders hired Clinkscales as Director of Player Personnel. This move reunited Clinkscales with his old high school and college teammate, Raiders General Manager Reggie McKenzie. He was fired in January 2019, shortly after McKenzie was fired.

In May 2019, Clinkscales was named director of player personnel for the Los Angeles Wildcats of the XFL.

In June 2022, Clinkscales was named director of player personnel for the planned Las Vegas XFL team, which was named the Vegas Vipers in September. On January 1, 2024, it was announced the Vipers would not be a part of the UFL Merger.
