= Bruce Wilkerson =

American football player (born 1964)

No. 68, 64
- Positions: Tackle, guard

Personal information
- Born: July 28, 1964 (age 62); Loudon, Tennessee, U.S.
- Listed height: 6 ft 5 in (1.96 m)
- Listed weight: 310 lb (141 kg)

Career information
- High school: Loudon
- College: Tennessee
- NFL draft: 1987: 2nd round, 52nd overall pick

Career history
- Los Angeles Raiders (1987–1994); Jacksonville Jaguars (1995); Green Bay Packers (1996–1997)

Awards and highlights
- Super Bowl champion (XXXI); First-team All-SEC (1985); Second-team All-SEC (1986)

Career NFL statistics
- Games played: 147
- Games started: 94
- Fumble recoveries: 5
- Stats at Pro Football Reference

Bruce Alan Wilkerson (born July 28, 1964) is an American former professional football player who was an offensive tackle for three National Football League (NFL) teams from 1987 to 1997. He started in Super Bowl XXXI for the Green Bay Packers. Wilkerson played college football for the Tennessee Volunteers, twice earning All-SEC honors.

Wilkerson attended Loudon High School in Loudon, Tennessee, where he played both offensive tackle and defensive tackle, and was named to the all-state team his senior year. He signed with Tennessee in 1982, though he was a redshirt his first year.

Working with Tennessee offensive line coach (and future head coach) Phillip Fulmer, Wilkerson secured a spot in the second string during the 1983 season, backing up veteran tackle Curt Singer. By his sophomore season in 1984, he was a starter, anchoring a line that helped running back Johnnie Jones set career rushing records. Wilkerson was an integral member of the 1985 "Sugar Vols" squad, and was named All-SEC and 2nd-team All-American at the end of the season. In the 1986 Sugar Bowl, Wilkerson's block on Miami nose guard Jerome Brown helped spring Jeff Powell's 60-yard touchdown run.

After an All-SEC senior year in 1986, Wilkerson was selected by the Los Angeles Raiders in the second round of the 1987 NFL draft. He spent his first eight seasons with the Raiders, and was a starter throughout the early 1990s. He was on the inaugural roster of the Jacksonville Jaguars in 1995, and closed out his career with Green Bay.
