= Daryl Dickey =

American football player, coach, and administrator (born 1961)

Biographical details
- Born: June 11, 1961 (age 65); Gainesville, Florida, U.S.

Playing career
- 1982–1985: Tennessee
- 1986: San Diego Chargers
- 1986–1987: Memphis Showboats
- Position: Quarterback

Coaching career (HC unless noted)
- 1987: Tennessee (GA)
- 1988: Milano Rhinos (OC)
- 1988: Tennessee (assistant QB)
- 1989: Florida State (QB)
- 1990–1992: Kentucky (QB)
- 1993–1994: Kentucky (OC)
- 1995–1996: Georgia Southern (OC/QB)
- 1997–2000: Presbyterian
- 2001–2006: Florida State (QB)
- 2008–2013: West Georgia

Administrative career (AD unless noted)
- 2009–2020: West Georgia

Head coaching record
- Overall: 47–57

Accomplishments and honors

Awards
- Sugar Bowl MVP (1986); Gulf South Coach of The Year (2011)

Daryl Raymond Dickey (born June 11, 1961) is an American football administrator, former coach, and former player. He served as the head football coach at the University of West Georgia from 2008 through the 2013 season, and assumed the athletic director position in 2009. He served as the head football coach at Presbyterian College from 1997 to 2000.

Dickey played quarterback for the University of Tennessee, where he is remembered for coming off the bench during the 1985 season and leading the Vols to the SEC Championship and a 35–7 upset of Miami in the Sugar Bowl.

== Playing career ==
Dickey attended Fairview High School in Boulder, Colorado. He initially joined the football team at the University of Tennessee in 1980, but left the team for a year after suffering an injury. He redshirted in 1982.

For most of his college career, Dickey was a backup to star quarterbacks Alan Cockrell and Tony Robinson. His lone start prior to the 1985 season came against Army in 1984, when he completed 14 of 24 passes for 167 yards en route to a 24–24 tie.

During the 1985 season, Robinson, at the time a candidate for the Heisman Trophy, suffered a season-ending knee injury in the fourth quarter of a close game against Alabama. Dickey, by that time a fifth-year senior, stepped in as his replacement, and the Vols held on for a 16–14 victory. After a 6–6 tie against Georgia Tech the following week, Dickey led the Vols to five consecutive victories, helping the team earn its first Southeastern Conference (SEC) championship since 1969. During this run, Dickey threw just one interception in 130 attempts, at one point throwing 106 consecutive passes without an interception.

As SEC champions, the Vols earned a berth in the Sugar Bowl, played on New Year's Day in 1986. Their opponent, the Miami Hurricanes, were ranked number two in the nation, having won ten consecutive games, and were in contention for a national championship. Completing 15 of 25 passes for 131 yards and a touchdown, Dickey led the Vols to a 35–7 upset of the Hurricanes, and was named Sugar Bowl MVP.

Dickey played professional football for the San Diego Chargers in the National Football League (NFL) and for the Memphis Showboats in the United States Football League (USFL).

== Coaching career ==
Dickey began his coaching career at Tennessee as a graduate assistant coach and then as the assistant quarterback coach; he later became a volunteer assistant at Florida State University.

Dickey left Florida State to become the quarterbacks coach at the University of Kentucky in 1990 and served in that position before becoming Kentucky's offensive coordinator in 1993 through 1994. In 1995, Dickey became offensive coordinator for Georgia Southern University, a position he held through 1996 when he became head coach at Presbyterian College in South Carolina.

After four years as Presbyterian's head coach, in 2001 Dickey joined the staff of Bobby Bowden as quarterbacks coach at Florida State. He became the head coach at the University of West Georgia in Carrollton, Georgia, in 2008. In 2009, he became school's athletic director. He resigned as coach following the 2013 season to focus solely on his role as athletic director.

Dickey stepped down from his role as athletic director in August 2020.

== Family ==
Dickey is the son of Doug Dickey, the former head football coach of the University of Tennessee and the University of Florida. He is married to the former Kendall George from Knoxville, Tennessee. They have three children together: Karis, Dallas, and Daryl Andrew (Drew).

== Head coaching record ==
Year	Team	Overall	Conference	Standing	Bowl/playoffs
Presbyterian Blue Hose (South Atlantic Conference) (1997–2000)
1997	Presbyterian	5–6	3–4	T–5th	
1998	Presbyterian	8–3	6–1	2nd	
1999	Presbyterian	7–4	4–4	T–4th	
2000	Presbyterian	8–2	6–1	2nd	
Presbyterian:		28–15	19–10		
West Georgia Wolves (Gulf South Conference) (2008–2013)
2008	West Georgia	0–10	0–8	11th	
2009	West Georgia	1–9	1–7	11th	
2010	West Georgia	3–7	2–6	10th	
2011	West Georgia	6–4	2–2	T–2nd	
2012	West Georgia	3–7	1–4	T–5th	
2013	West Georgia	6–5	2–3	T–4th	
West Georgia:		19–42	8–30		
Total:		47–57			
