= The Dewberry =

- U.S. Historic district – Contributing property
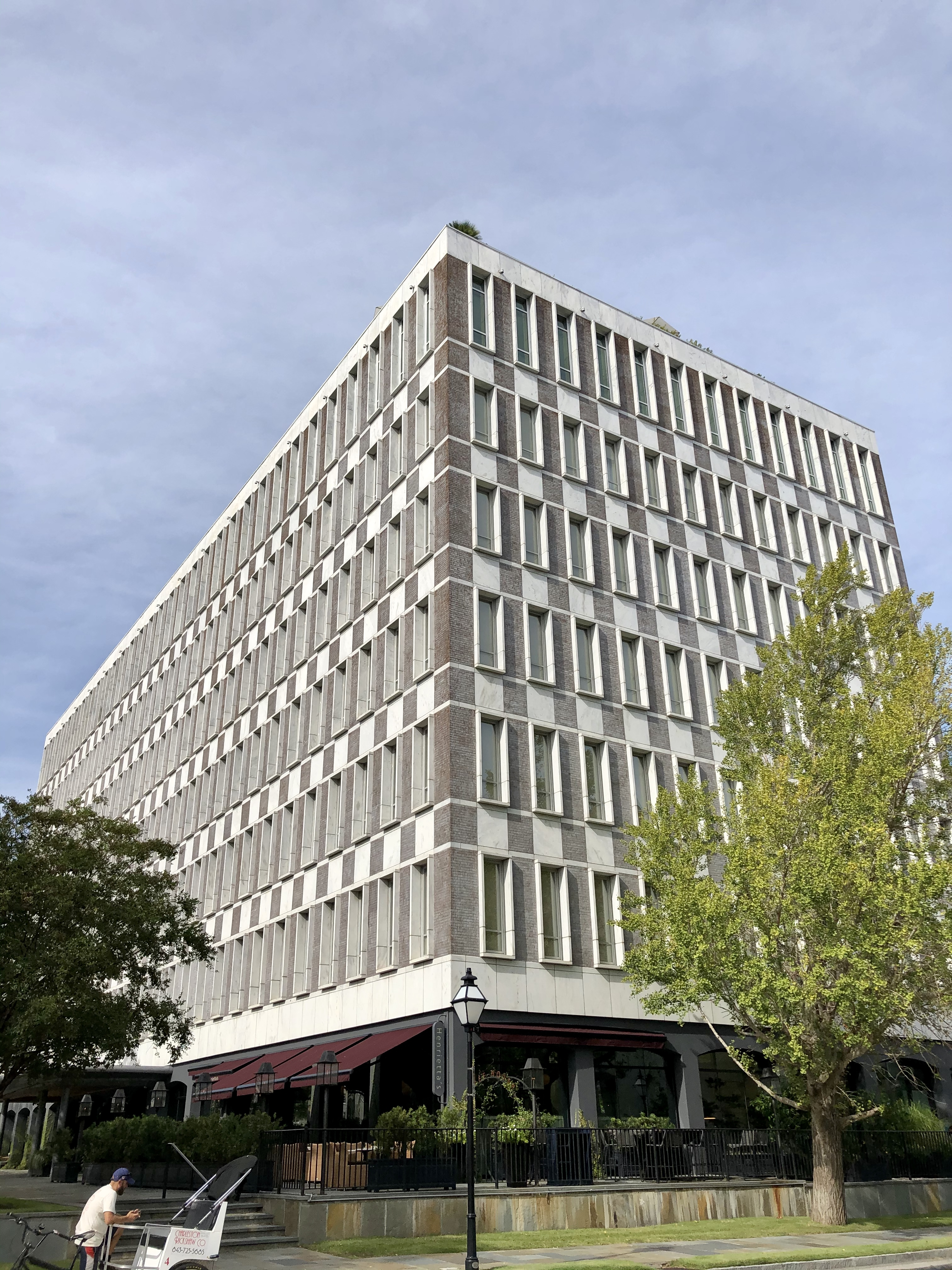
- 2019 view
- Location: Charleston, South Carolina
- Architectural style: Mid-Century Modern
- Part of: Charleston Historic District (ID78002497)
- Designated CP: July 16, 1978

The Dewberry, in Charleston, South Carolina, is a hotel built in 1964–65 in Mid-Century Modern style.

It was originally the L. Mendel Rivers Federal Building, so named in 1964 for L. Mendel Rivers. It was a seven-story office building located across Meeting Street from Marion Square. The building was damaged in 1999 by Hurricane Floyd and was vacated; it was purchased in January 2008 by a private developer and later became a hotel.

It is located within the Charleston Historic District, although the district features many much older buildings. The district's NRHP nomination document does not state whether this building might be considered an intrusion or whether it was deemed contributing to the historic character of the district.

It has been listed by the National Trust for Historic Preservation as a member of Historic Hotels of America since 2016.
