= Gary Lee (American football) =

American football player (born 1965)

No. 83
- Position: Wide receiver

Personal information
- Born: February 12, 1965 (age 61); Albany, Georgia, U.S.
- Listed height: 6 ft 1 in (1.85 m)
- Listed weight: 202 lb (92 kg)

Career information
- High school: Westover (Albany, Georgia)
- College: Georgia Tech
- NFL draft: 1987: 12th round, 315th overall pick

Career history
- Detroit Lions (1987–1988); Denver Broncos (1989)*; Atlanta Falcons (1990)*
- * Offseason or practice squad member only

Career NFL statistics
- Receptions: 41
- Receiving yards: 569
- Touchdowns: 1
- Stats at Pro Football Reference

Gary DeWayne Lee (born February 12, 1965) is an American former professional football player who was a wide receiver for the Detroit Lions in the National Football League (NFL). He played collegiately for the Georgia Tech football team.

== College Statistics ==
- 1983: 2 catches for 44 yards.
- 1984: 12 catches for 244 yards and 4 touchdowns. 2 carries for 6 yards.
- 1985: 29 catches for 645 yards and 6 touchdowns. 10 carries for 42 yards.
- 1986: 24 catches for 386 yards and 1 touchdown. 1 carry for -1 yard.

== Detroit Lions ==
Gary Lee was selected in the 12th round of the 1987 NFL draft with the 315th overall pick. Lee would serve as a backup wide receiver and kick returner for Detroit for just 2 seasons. In 1987, he had 19 catches for 308 yards and returned 32 kick offs for 719 yards. In 1988, he had 22 catches for 261 yards and 1 touchdown while returning 18 kick offs for 355 yards.
