= Jeff Francis (American football) =

American football player (born 1966)

No. 13
- Position: Quarterback

Personal information
- Born: July 7, 1966 (age 60); Park Ridge, Illinois, U.S.
- Listed height: 6 ft 4 in (1.93 m)
- Listed weight: 225 lb (102 kg)

Career information
- High school: Prospect (Mount Prospect, Illinois)
- College: Tennessee
- NFL draft: 1989: 6th round, 140th overall pick

Career history
- Los Angeles Raiders (1989–1990)*; Cleveland Browns (1990–1992); Indianapolis Colts (1992)*
- * Offseason or practice squad member only

Career NFL statistics
- TD–INT: 0–0
- Passing yards: 26
- Passer rating: 118.7
- Stats at Pro Football Reference

Jeffrey Lee Francis (born July 7, 1966) is an American former professional football player who was a quarterback in the National Football League (NFL). He was selected by the Los Angeles Raiders in the 1989 NFL draft and also played for the Cleveland Browns. He played college football for the Tennessee Volunteers.

== Early life ==
Francis attended Prospect High School in Mount Prospect, Illinois.

== College career ==
Francis played quarterback for Johnny Majors at the University of Tennessee from 1985 to 1988, starting from 1987 to 1988. He was the starting quarterback for Tennessee in the 1988 Peach Bowl, which the Volunteers won 27–22 over the Indiana Hoosiers. He was Tennessee's all-time leader in pass completions and passing yards at the time of his graduation.

=== Statistics ===
Year	School	Conf	Pos	Cmp	Att	Pct	Yds	Y/A	AY/A	TD	Int	Rate
1985	Tennessee	SEC	QB	14	20	70.0	172	8.6	7.4	1	1	148.7
1986	Tennessee	SEC	QB	150	233	64.4	1,946	8.4	8.0	9	6	142.1
1987	Tennessee	SEC	QB	121	201	60.2	1,512	7.5	6.5	8	8	128.6
1988	Tennessee	SEC	QB	191	314	60.8	2,237	7.1	6.4	13	11	127.3
Career	Tennessee			476	768	62.0	5,867	7.6	6.9	31	26	132.7

== Professional career ==
=== Los Angeles Raiders ===
Francis was selected by the Los Angeles Raiders in the sixth round of the 1989 NFL draft and spent his rookie season on the Raiders' development roster. He was waived by the Raiders on September 4, 1990.

=== Cleveland Browns ===
On October 11, he was signed by the Cleveland Browns and placed on the practice squad. Francis was activated by the Browns before their December 23 game against the Pittsburgh Steelers. He appeared in that game, completing two passes for 26 yards.

Francis spent the 1991 season on injured reserve and was cut by the Browns on August 25, 1992. He was re-signed by Cleveland on September 23 when backup Todd Philcox went on the injured reserve. He was again waived by the Browns on October 1.

=== Indianapolis Colts ===
On November 18, 1992, the Indianapolis Colts signed Francis to their practice roster. He was waived on December 9, 1992.

== Personal life ==
Francis was the sideline reporter for the Vol Network from 1999 to 2006. He resigned from the job to spend more time with his family, including coaching his sons’ football teams. In addition, he now is senior vice president and financial consultant with Pinnacle Asset Management.
