= John Dewberry =

American football player and real estate developer

Georgia Tech Yellow Jackets
- Position: Quarterback

Career information
- High school: Milton
- College: Georgia Tech (1983–1985)

Awards and highlights
- First-team All-ACC (1984)

John Dewberry is a former starting quarterback for the Georgia Tech Yellow Jackets football team from 1983 to 1985. He graduated from Milton High School. He played for the Calgary Stampeders of the Canadian Football League (CFL) before starting his first company in 1989. He is an Atlanta-based real estate developer and founder of Dewberry Capital, now known as Dewberry Group.

== Football career ==
After the 1981 season, John Dewberry left the University of Georgia football team due to lack of playing time, and he transferred to Georgia Tech. Dewberry helped Georgia Tech defeat Georgia in two straight games. Dewberry also initiated the tradition of Georgia Tech players taking pieces of the Hedges after a Tech football win in Athens.

== Real estate career ==
After graduating from Georgia Tech in 1986, Dewberry played briefly for the Calgary Stampeders of the Canadian Football League before returning to Atlanta, where he began his real estate career under developer Kim King, a fellow Georgia Tech alumnus. In 1989, he founded Dewberry Capital with $5,000 of his own money, and secured a $4 million loan to develop a shopping center in North Charleston, South Carolina, as his first project.

=== Midtown Atlanta ===
Starting in 1998, Dewberry acquired a series of parcels along Peachtree Street in Midtown Atlanta. He initially planned to build a grocery-anchored shopping center at Peachtree and Spring streets but changed course after learning that no Class-A office building had been constructed in Midtown in nearly a decade. He built One Peachtree Pointe, a 200,000-square-foot office building, in the late 1990s.

He continued acquiring Midtown land in the early 2000s, including a nearly four-acre site at 10th Street and Peachtree Street for more than $6 million in 2002, a hotel at 125 10th Street from Wyndham for $21 million in 2003, a parking structure at Eighth and Juniper streets in 2004, and nearly seven acres adjacent to The Temple for $6.9 million in 2005. In 2007, he completed Two Peachtree Pointe, an 18-story, 300,000-square-foot tower anchored by Invesco.

By 2017, Dewberry controlled approximately 25 acres of Midtown Atlanta real estate, most of it held debt-free and largely undeveloped. Bloomberg profiled him that year under the headline "Atlanta's Emperor of Empty Lots." Harvard Business School published a case study on Dewberry Capital examining his approach to land acquisition and long-term holding.

Dewberry also encountered setbacks during this period. He lost the Hotel Midtown — the former Wyndham property at 125 10th Street — to foreclosure in 2011 after defaulting on a $26 million loan.

=== The Dewberry, Charleston ===
In 2008, Dewberry purchased the L. Mendel Rivers Federal Building in Charleston, South Carolina from the General Services Administration for $15 million. The mid-century modernist building, constructed during the Kennedy administration, had been vacant since 1999. After investing approximately $75 million in restoration and conversion, Dewberry opened The Dewberry, a 154-room luxury hotel, in 2016. The hotel has received a Virtuoso award for best independent hotel and has appeared on Travel + Leisure's annual list of the world's top 500 hotels.

=== Charlottesville hotel ===
In June 2012, Dewberry bid $6.25 million for an unfinished building shell in downtown Charlottesville, Virginia. Previous developers had broken ground on the site in 2008 as a planned 100-room, nine-story luxury hotel before construction halted the following year amid the Great Recession. Dewberry intended to complete the project as the second hotel in his self-titled portfolio but redirected much of his staff toward the Charleston hotel, whose completion took longer than he had anticipated; he had previously stated he would not begin work in Charlottesville until the Charleston project was underway.

In September 2013, Charlottesville's Department of Neighborhood Development Services notified a Dewberry Capital representative that the property met the city's legal definition of blight, citing its deteriorating condition and a security fence the department said was frequently breached. Dewberry disputed this characterization in a written response, stating the property was secured with a padlock and that he was not aware of evidence the fence had been breached.

In January 2016, the Charlottesville City Council directed staff to examine possible legal action to compel work on the site. The following year, Dewberry asked the city for incentives, including free parking and more than $1 million in tax breaks, to help complete the project; the council initially backed the concept but voted down the formal incentive agreement in late 2017.

In February 2022, the nonprofit Friends of Cville Downtown installed a vinyl mural wrap depicting musical instruments around the building shell, with the approval of Dewberry and his wife, Jaimie Brown Dewberry. The wrap was intended to remain in place for 14 to 16 months but was still installed more than four years later. Dewberry listed the property for sale in late 2024 but withdrew it after he said he did not receive an offer he found acceptable. As of 2026, the site, which some local residents and media referred to informally as the "Rat Hotel," had remained unfinished for 18 years, 14 of them under Dewberry's ownership.

=== The Midtowne ===
In 2010, Dewberry purchased the Campanile, a 21-story office tower at 1155 Peachtree Street NE in Midtown Atlanta, for $36 million in a distressed sale. The building had served as BellSouth's corporate headquarters before the company vacated it following its merger with AT&T. By 2017, the tower was approximately half-vacant. That year, Dewberry also secured a tax abatement from the Development Authority of Fulton County estimated at $5.7 million over a decade, contingent on a promised $125 million investment projected to create about 1,350 jobs. According to the Development Authority, Dewberry had not received any portion of the abatement as of 2026 because the building had not obtained a certificate of occupancy.

In 2019, Dewberry secured a $186 million construction loan from H.I.G. Realty Partners and Square Mile Capital to finance a comprehensive redevelopment, including removal of the building's facade. Work began that year but stopped in early 2020. Dewberry attributed the stoppage to a contractor change; the COVID-19 pandemic further delayed the project. The lenders sold the nonperforming note in 2021. Dewberry paid it off and refinanced with a $75 million loan from Acore Capital Mortgage. The nonperforming note had been sold to California-based Dornin Investment Group, a firm specializing in distressed debt. The Acore loan, originally set to mature in December 2025, was later extended by two years, according to Dewberry.

In 2022, Dewberry announced plans to expand the tower by six floors, to 27 stories, and rebranded the property as The Midtowne. As of 2026, the exterior of the building remained visibly incomplete, with a construction crane that had been inactive for years. In May 2026, the City of Atlanta issued an "unsafe" citation for the site. Dewberry declined to comment on the citation; his wife, Jaimie Brown Dewberry, told the AJC the site was active and secure. The following month, the Atlanta City Council voted to approve a measure to apply a blight tax to the property. If imposed by the mayor's office following an investigation confirming the property meets the city's legal definition of blight, the tax could raise the property's annual city tax bill from approximately $91,000 to nearly $2.3 million; commercial property owners frequently contest such blight determinations in court. Atlanta City Councilman Amir Farokhi had previously compared the structure's appearance to war-damaged buildings he had seen in Bosnia.

=== Trademark litigation ===
In 2006, Dewberry Engineers, a Virginia-based engineering firm unrelated to Dewberry Capital, sued Dewberry for trademark infringement. The parties settled in 2007. When Dewberry rebranded his firm as Dewberry Group in 2020, Dewberry Engineers filed a second suit. A federal district court ruled in the plaintiffs' favor and awarded $43 million in damages. Dewberry appealed, and in February 2025 the Supreme Court of the United States unanimously reversed the judgment in Dewberry Group v. Dewberry Engineers.

== See also ==
- List of Georgia Tech Yellow Jackets starting quarterbacks
- Georgia Tech Yellow Jackets football statistical leaders
