= Jeff Powell (American football) =

American football player (born 1963)

No. 31
- Position: Running back

Personal information
- Born: May 27, 1963 (age 63); Nashville, Tennessee, U.S.
- Listed height: 5 ft 10 in (1.78 m)
- Listed weight: 185 lb (84 kg)

Career information
- High school: Whites Creek (TN)
- College: William & Mary (1982); Tennessee (1985)
- NFL draft: 1986: 6th round, 166th overall pick

Career history
- Chicago Bears (1986)*; San Diego Chargers (1987); Detroit Lions (1989)*
- * Offseason or practice squad member only
- Stats at Pro Football Reference

Jeffrey O'Neal Powell (born May 27, 1963) is an American former professional football player who was a running back in the National Football League (NFL). Powell also won recognition as an elite hurdler in track and field. Powell played college football for the University of Tennessee and is famous for his 60-yard touchdown in the third quarter during the 1986 Sugar Bowl. He was selected by the Chicago Bears in the sixth round of the 1986 NFL draft, and after his football career, Powell earned a Juris Doctor degree from Vanderbilt University Law School. He currently practices law in Tennessee.

== Early life ==
Powell was born in Nashville, Tennessee. He attended Whites Creek Comprehensive High School where he lettered in both track and football. In addition to his athletic achievements, he was an honor student there. In 1981, Powell set a Tennessee Secondary School Athletic Association (TSSAA) record in track for the 110-meter high hurdle event. Powell's peers elected him "Most Athletic" among the senior superlatives of the Class of 1982. That summer, Jeff Powell represented the United States during the second Pan American Junior Athletics Championships held in Barquisimeto, Venezuela where he earned the silver medal in the 110-metre hurdles.

== College career ==
Jeff Powell's athletic versatility is evident through the numerous awards he earned as a hurdler and as a running back. Powell's academic talent equaled his athletic abilities. He earned a Bachelor of Arts degree (with honors) in Accounting from the University of Tennessee at Knoxville in 1986.

=== William & Mary ===
Powell enrolled at the College of William and Mary in Williamsburg, Virginia in 1982. During his freshman year, he earned the State Champion title for the 60-meter high hurdles. Powell was also a member of the Tribe football team in 1982. On April 26, 1984, Jeff Powell set a William & Mary record for outdoor track events. At the Penn Relay Carnival, he completed the 110-meter hurdles in 13.90 seconds. Powell was also named a 1984 All-American for the indoor track 55-meter hurdles event.

=== Tennessee ===
To increase opportunities to run track, in 1984, Powell transferred to the University of Tennessee, located in Knoxville, Tennessee. That same year, he finished fourth in the 110-meter high hurdles at the NCAA Indoor Championships. Powell would join the Volunteers' football team during spring practice in 1985, when he was awarded the team's final scholarship by Coach Johnny Majors. He was a backup for most of the season, but received substantial playing time late in the season after starters Charles Wilson and Keith Davis struggled with injuries. He ran for 60 yards on 13 carries against Ole Miss, and 88 yards on 16 carries against Kentucky. For the regular season, he ran for 235 yards on 55 carries. Exhibiting his talent on special teams, Powell returned seven kickoffs for 145 yards.

==== 1986 Sugar Bowl ====
Jeff Powell is perhaps best remembered among Vol fans for his performance in Tennessee's 35–7 victory over Miami in the 1986 Sugar Bowl, in which he ran for 104 yards and a touchdown on 11 carries. On January 1, 1986, the #8 ranked Tennessee Volunteers were matched with the #2 ranked University of Miami Hurricanes at the Superdome located in New Orleans, Louisiana. During the 3rd quarter, Powell ran off-tackle and out-sprinted Hurricane safeties Bennie Blades and Selwyn Brown for 60 yards to the end zone. It was during this run that legendary Volunteers broadcaster John Ward made his well-known "5-4-3-2-1 ... sixty yards ... Jeff Powell!" call. Powell's touchdown and the ensuing extra point gave Tennessee a 28-7 lead over the Hurricanes and blew the game wide open.

== NFL career ==
As Powell was completing his undergraduate degree requirements, the Chicago Bears selected him in the sixth round (166th overall) of the 1986 NFL draft and later traded him to the San Diego Chargers. Powell's career in the NFL did not last very long. He appeared for only one game during the 1987 season. He did not record any statistics other than his appearance.

== Law career ==
Powell enrolled in Vanderbilt University Law School in Nashville, Tennessee in the fall of 1989. He earned a Doctor of Jurisprudence degree in May 1992, and passed the Tennessee bar examination shortly thereafter. Today, he is an attorney practicing law in Tennessee.
