= 1986 Sugar Bowl =

- 52nd Sugar Bowl
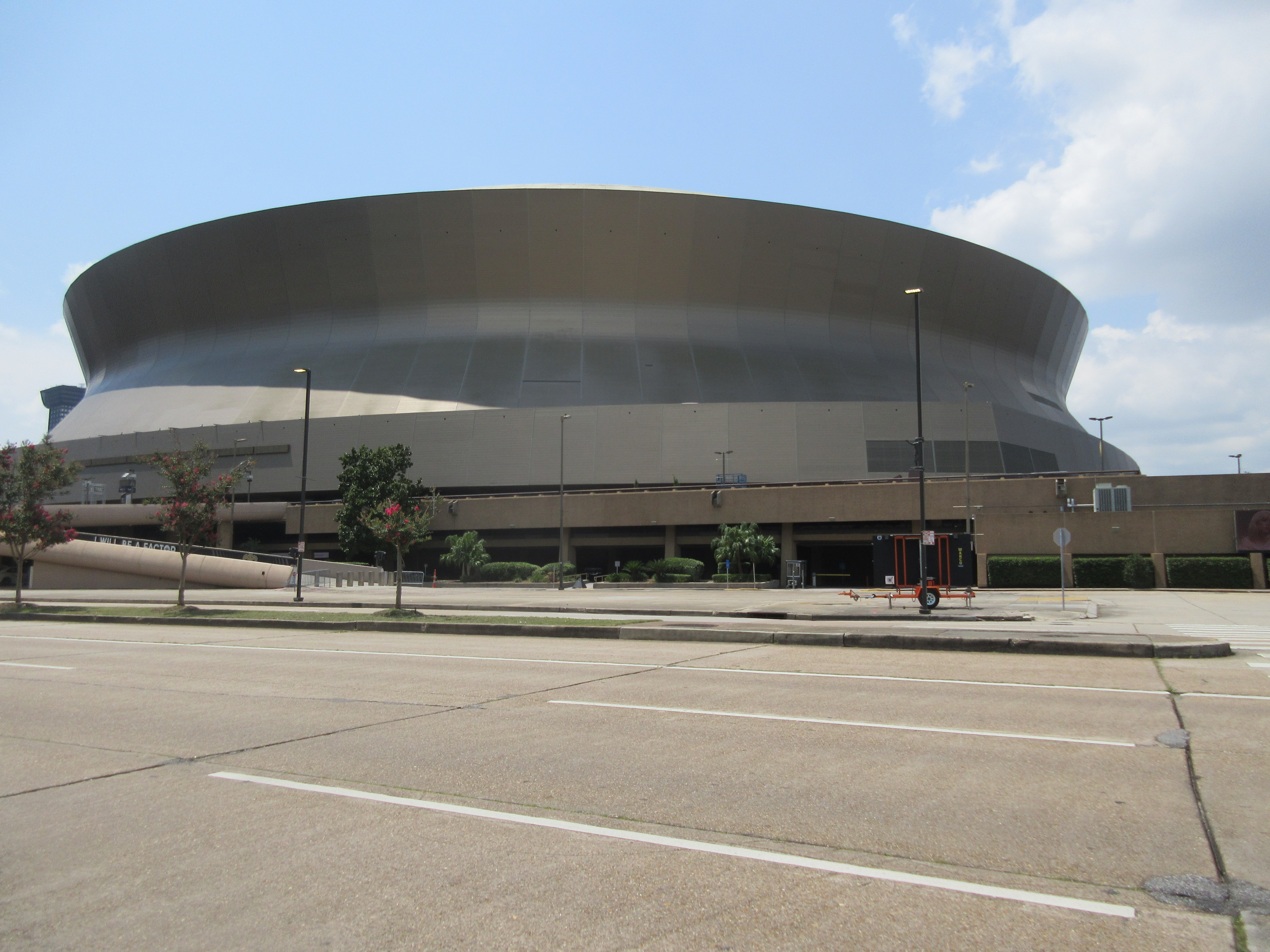
- The Louisiana Superdome in New Orleans, Louisiana, hosted the Sugar Bowl.
| Miami Hurricanes | Tennessee Volunteers |
| (10–1) | (8–1–2) |
| Independent | SEC |
| 7 | 35 |
| Head coach: Jimmy Johnson | Head coach: Johnny Majors |
| AP / Coaches; 2 / 4 | AP / Coaches; 8 / 8 |
| | 1 | 2 | 3 | 4 | Total |
|---|---|---|---|---|---|
| Miami | 7 | 0 | 0 | 0 | 7 |
| Tennessee | 0 | 14 | 14 | 7 | 35 |
- Date: January 1, 1986
- Season: 1985
- Stadium: Louisiana Superdome
- Location: New Orleans, Louisiana
- MVP: Daryl Dickey (Tennessee QB)
- Favorite: Miami by 8 points
- Referee: Wendell Shelton (SWC)

United States TV coverage
- Network: ABC
- Announcers: Keith Jackson, Frank Broyles

The 1986 Sugar Bowl was the 52nd edition of the college football bowl game, played at the Louisiana Superdome in New Orleans, Louisiana, on Wednesday, January 1. Part of the 1985–86 bowl game season, it matched the independent and second-ranked Miami Hurricanes and the #8 Tennessee Volunteers of the Southeastern Conference (SEC).

Underdog Tennessee trailed early, rallied, and won in a rout, 35–7.

== Teams ==
=== Miami ===
The second-ranked Hurricanes were competing for another national championship; they won ten straight after dropping the opener at home to Florida. Miami's most notable win was at Oklahoma in October, which was the Sooners' only loss.

=== Tennessee ===
The #8 Volunteers had two non-conference ties at home (UCLA, Georgia Tech), and a loss at Florida.

== Game summary ==
The game kicked off shortly after 7 p.m. CST, televised by ABC, at the same time as the Orange Bowl on NBC, with top-ranked Penn State and #3 Oklahoma.

Miami appeared dominant on its opening drive, capped with an 18-yard touchdown pass from Vinny Testaverde to Michael Irvin, and took the 7–0 lead into the second quarter. As the game wore on, however, Tennessee's defense began to shut down Miami's vaunted passing attack. Volunteers' quarterback Daryl Dickey threw a six-yard touchdown pass to Jeff Smith to tie the game at seven.

A drive from midfield took Tennessee to the Miami nine, where running back Jeff Powell gained eight yards but fumbled at the one, and All-American wide receiver Tim McGee recovered it in the end zone; Tennessee took the lead at 14–7, the score at halftime.

In the third quarter, Sam Henderson scored from a yard out and Tennessee led 21–7, then Powell broke for a sixty-yard run to make it 28–7. In the fourth quarter, Charles Wilson scored on a six-yard run as Tennessee won by a 35–7 margin.

Tennessee quarterback Dickey, a fifth-year senior back-up, was named the game's most valuable player.

=== Scoring ===
First quarter

- Miami – Michael Irvin 18-yard pass from Vinny Testaverde (Greg Cox kick)

Second quarter

- Tennessee – Jeff Smith 6-yard pass from Daryl Dickey (Carlos Reveiz kick)
- Tennessee – Tim McGee recovered fumble in end zone (Reveiz kick)

Third quarter

- Tennessee – Sam Henderson 1-yard run (Reveiz kick)
- Tennessee – Jeff Powell 60-yard run (Reveiz kick)

Fourth quarter

- Tennessee – Charles Wilson 6-yard run (Reveiz kick)

== Statistics ==
| Statistics | Miami | Tennessee |
|---|---|---|
| First downs | 22 | 16 |
| Rushes–yards | 30–22 | 43–211 |
| Passing yards | 237 | 131 |
| Passes (C–A–I) | 23–44–4 | 15–25–1 |
| Total offense | 74–259 | 68–342 |
| Return yards | 34 | 105 |
| Punts–average | 6–38 | 6–39 |
| Fumbles–lost | 5–2 | 2–1 |
| Turnovers | 6 | 2 |
| Penalties–yards | 15–120 | 11–125 |
| Time of possession | 28:59 | 31:01 |

The 245 yards of penalties set a new Sugar Bowl record.

== Aftermath ==
Tennessee climbed to fourth in the final AP poll, while Miami fell to ninth.
