= 1984–85 NCAA football bowl games =

College football postseason game series

- Season: 1984
- Number of bowls: 18
- Bowl games: December 15, 1984 – January 1, 1985
- National Championship: 1984 Holiday Bowl
- Location of Championship: Jack Murphy Stadium, San Diego
- Champions: BYU Cougars
Bowl record by conference
Conference	Bowls	Record	Final AP poll
Independents	7	3–3–1 (0.500)	4
SEC	6	2–3–1 (0.417)	4
Big Ten	6	1–5 (0.167)	2
SWC	5	1–4 (0.200)	1
Pac-10	3	3–0 (1.000)	3
Big Eight	3	2–1 (0.667)	3
ACC	2	2–0 (1.000)	2
WAC	2	2–0 (1.000)	1
PCAA	1	1–0 (1.000)	0
MAC	1	0–1 (0.000)	0

The 1984–85 NCAA football bowl games were a series of post-season games played in December 1984 and January 1985 to end the 1984 NCAA Division I-A football season. A total of 18 team-competitive games, and two all-star games, were played. The post-season began with the Independence Bowl on December 15, 1984, and concluded on January 12, 1985, with the season-ending Senior Bowl.

== Schedule ==
Date	Game	Site	Time (US EST)	TV	Matchup (pre-game record)	AP pre-game rank	UPI (Coaches) pre-game rank
Dec 15	Independence Bowl	Independence Stadium; Shreveport, Louisiana		ESPN	Air Force 23 (7–4) (WAC), Virginia Tech 7 (8–3) (Independent)	NR; NR	NR; NR
Dec 15	California Bowl	Bulldog Stadium; Fresno, California		ESPN	UNLV 30 (10–2) (PCAA Champion), Toledo 13 (8–2–1) (MAC Champion)	NR; NR	NR; NR
Dec 21	Holiday Bowl	Jack Murphy Stadium; San Diego, California		Mizlou / ESPN	BYU 24 (12–0) (WAC Champion), Michigan 17 (6–5) (Big Ten)	#1; NR	#1; NR
Dec 22	Florida Citrus Bowl	Florida Citrus Bowl; Orlando, Florida		NBC	Georgia 17 (7–4) (SEC), Florida State 17 (7–3–1) (Independent)	NR #15	NR #16
Dec 22	Sun Bowl	Sun Bowl; El Paso, Texas		CBS	Maryland 28 (8–3) (ACC Champion), Tennessee 27 (7–3–1) (SEC)	#12; NR	#11; NR
Dec 22	Cherry Bowl	Pontiac Silverdome; Pontiac, Michigan		USA Network	Army 10 (8–3) (Independent), Michigan State 6 (6–5) (Big Ten)	NR; NR	NR; NR
Dec 26	Freedom Bowl	Anaheim Stadium; Anaheim, California		Lorimar	Iowa 55 (7–4–1) (Big Ten), Texas 17 (7–3–1) (SWC)	NR #19	NR #20
Dec 27	Liberty Bowl	Liberty Bowl Memorial Stadium; Memphis, Tennessee		Katz Sports	Auburn 21 (8–4) (SEC), Arkansas 15 (7–3–1) (SWC)	#16; NR	#19; NR
Dec 28	Gator Bowl	Gator Bowl Stadium; Jacksonville, Florida		ABC	Oklahoma State 21 (9–2) (Big Eight), South Carolina 14 (10–1) (Independent)	#9 #7	#9 #7
Dec 29	Aloha Bowl	Aloha Stadium; Honolulu, Hawaii	8:00 pm	TCS/Metrosports	SMU 27 (9–2) (SWC co-Champion), Notre Dame 20 (7–4) (Independent)	#10 #17	#10 #18
Dec 29	Hall of Fame Classic	Legion Field; Birmingham, Alabama	8:00 PM	WTBS	Kentucky 20 (8–3) (SEC), Wisconsin 19 (7–3–1) (Big Ten)	NR #20	NR #17
Dec 31	Peach Bowl	Fulton County Stadium; Atlanta	3:00 PM	CBS	Virginia 27 (7–2–2) (ACC), Purdue 24 (7–4) (Big Ten)	NR; NR	NR; NR
Dec 31	Astro-Bluebonnet Bowl	Houston Astrodome; Houston, Texas	8:00 PM	Lorimar	West Virginia 31 (7–4) (Independent), TCU 14 (8–3) (SWC)	NR; NR	NR; NR
Jan 1	Cotton Bowl	Cotton Bowl; Dallas, Texas	1:30 PM	CBS	Boston College 45 (9–2) (Independent), Houston 28 (7–4) (SWC co-Champion)	#8; NR	#8; NR
Jan 1	Fiesta Bowl	Sun Devil Stadium; Tempe, Arizona	1:30 PM	NBC	UCLA 39 (8–3) (Pac-10), Miami (FL) 37 (8–4) (Independent)	#14 #13	#15 #13
Jan 1	Rose Bowl	Rose Bowl; Pasadena, California	4:30 PM	NBC	USC 20 (8–3) (Pac-10 Champion), Ohio State 17 (9–2) (Big Ten Champion)	#18 #6	#14 #5
Jan 1	Sugar Bowl	Louisiana Superdome; New Orleans, Louisiana	7:00 PM	ABC	Nebraska 28 (9–2) (Big Eight co-Champion), LSU 10 (8–2–1) (SEC)	#5 #11	#4 #12
Jan 1	Orange Bowl	Orange Bowl; Miami, Florida	8:00 PM	NBC	Washington 25 (10–1) (Pac-10), Oklahoma 17 (9–1–1) (Big Eight co-Champion)	#4 #2	#3 #2
