= 1985 Cotton Bowl Classic =

- 49th Cotton Bowl Classic
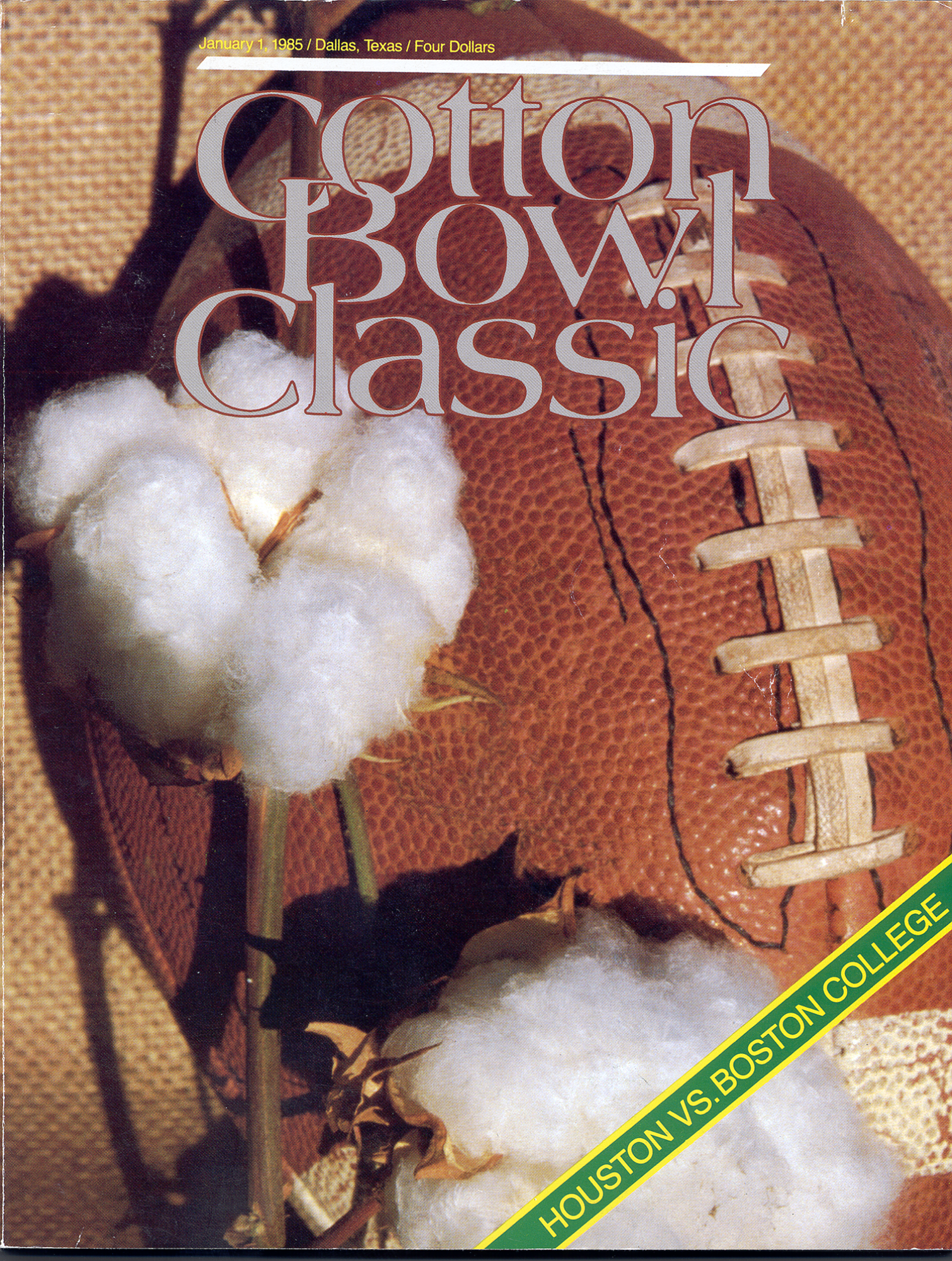
Boston College Eagles	Houston Cougars
(9–2)	(7–4)
Independent	SWC
45	28
Head coach: Jack Bicknell	Head coach: Bill Yeoman
AP / Coaches; 8 / 8	AP / Coaches; NR / NR
	1	2	3	4	Total
Boston College	17	14	0	14	45
Houston	7	7	14	0	28
- Date: January 1, 1985
- Season: 1984
- Stadium: Cotton Bowl
- Location: Dallas, Texas
- MVP: Steve Strachan (FB, BC); Bill Romanowski (LB, BC)
- Favorite: Boston College by 6½
- Referee: John McClintock (Big 8)
- Attendance: 67,381

United States TV coverage
- Network: CBS
- Announcers: Lindsey Nelson, Pat Haden, and Ara Parseghian

The Cotton Bowl in Dallas, Texas, hosted the Cotton Bowl Classic.

The 1985 Cotton Bowl Classic was the 49th edition of the college football bowl game, played at the Cotton Bowl in Dallas, Texas, on Tuesday, January 1. Part of the 1984–85 bowl game season, it matched the No. 8 Boston College Eagles (independent) and the unranked Houston Cougars of the Southwest Conference (SWC). Boston College never trailed and won 45–28.

== Teams ==
=== Boston College ===
Boston College quarterback Doug Flutie gained national attention on November 23, when he led the Eagles to a memorable 47–45 win at Miami, in what would be called Hail Flutie. He left school as the NCAA’s all-time passing yardage leader with 10,579 yards, a consensus All-American, and the first quarterback to win the Heisman Trophy in thirteen years. This was BC's first Cotton Bowl appearance in 45 years, since January 1940. Boston College finished the regular season with a 9–2 record, and was the recipient of the Lambert-Meadowlands Trophy (emblematic of the 'Eastern championship' in Division I FBS).

=== Houston ===
Houston shared the Southwest Conference title for the first time since 1979. By virtue of their defeat of conference co-champion SMU during the season, the Cougars made their first Cotton Bowl appearance in five years. SMU defeated Notre Dame in the Aloha Bowl on December 28; the Mustangs finished with ten wins and were eighth in the final AP poll. Houston was the first unranked team to represent the SWC in the Cotton Bowl in 17 years.

== Game summary ==
The game kicked off shortly after 12:30 p.m. CST, as did the Fiesta Bowl on NBC. The game time temperature in Dallas was 32 °F (0 °C) with gusty winds, freezing rain, and the artificial turf was slick.

The Eagles rolled to a 31–14 lead at halftime on Flutie's three touchdown passes (to three different receivers) and a Steve Strachan 2-yard touchdown run, despite the Cougars' two quick ways of scoring touchdowns, one of which occurring when Larry Shepherd caught a Gerald Landry pass for a touchdown with 22 seconds left in the half.

Raymond Tate narrowed the lead with his touchdown late in the third quarter. Audray McMillian intercepted a Flutie pass and returned it 25 yards to the end zone to make it 31–28 as the third quarter ended. But the Eagles scored with 5:45 remaining on a Strachan 4-yard touchdown run. Troy Stradford sealed the game with a 18-yard touchdown run with 1:06 to go in the fourth quarter as Boston College won their first Cotton Bowl.

=== Scoring ===
First quarter

- Boston College – Kelvin Martin 63-yard pass from Doug Flutie (Kevin Snow kick)
- Boston College – Troy Stradford 8-yard pass from Flutie (Snow kick)
- Houston – Earl Allen 98-yard kickoff return (Mike Clendenen kick)
- Boston College – Snow 31-yard field goal

Second quarter

- Boston College – Gerard Phelan 13-yard pass from Flutie (Snow kick)
- Boston College – Steve Strachan 2-yard run (Snow kick)
- Houston – Larry Shepherd 15-yard pass from Gerald Landry (Clendenen kick)

Third quarter

- Houston – Raymond Tate 2-yard run (Clendenen kick)
- Houston – Audray McMillan 25-yard interception return (Clendenen kick)

Fourth quarter

- Boston College – Strachan 4-yard run (Snow kick)
- Boston College – Stradford 18-yard run (Snow kick)

== Statistics ==
Statistics	Boston College	Houston
First downs	22	15
Rushes–yards	50–357	42–202
Passing yards	180	154
Passes	13–37–2	9–29–2
Total yards	537	356
Punts–average	8–29	10–33
Fumbles–lost	2–1	3–2
Turnovers	3	4
Penalties–yards	7–64	7–66
Time of possession	34:41	25:19

== Aftermath ==
Boston College improved to 10–2 and climbed to No. 5 in the final AP poll. Through 2025, neither team has returned to the Cotton Bowl Classic.
