= 1985 Fiesta Bowl =

- 14th Fiesta Bowl
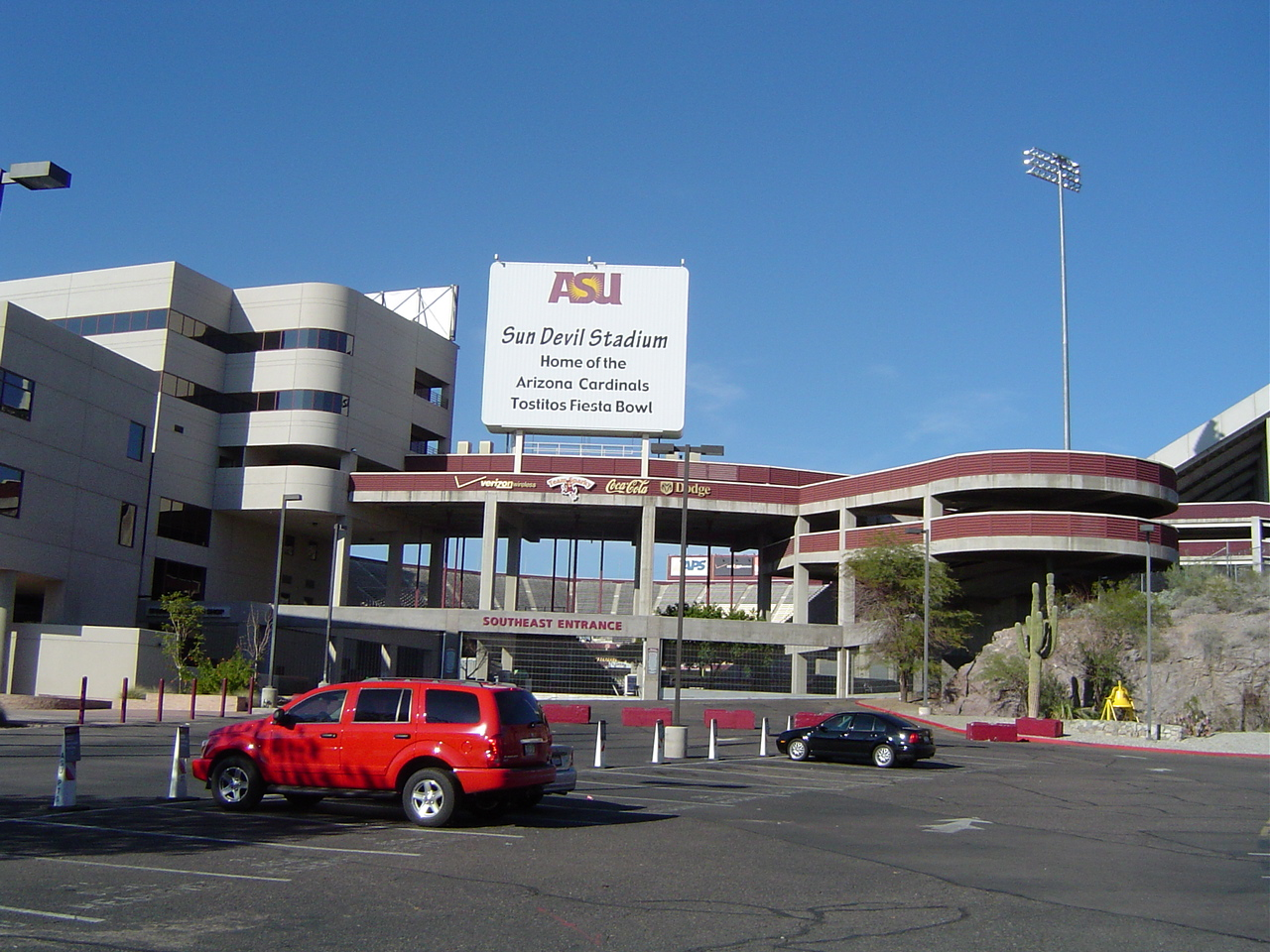
- Sun Devil Stadium in Tempe, Arizona, hosted the Fiesta Bowl.
UCLA Bruins	Miami Hurricanes
(8–3)	(8–4)
Pac-10	Independent
39	37
Head coach: Terry Donahue	Head coach: Jimmy Johnson
AP / Coaches; 14 / 15	AP / Coaches; 13 / 13
	1	2	3	4	Total
UCLA	7	15	7	10	39
Miami	14	7	3	13	37
- Date: January 1, 1985
- Season: 1984
- Stadium: Sun Devil Stadium
- Location: Tempe, Arizona
- MVP: Gaston Green (UCLA HB); James Washington (DB)
- Favorite: Miami by 6 points
- Referee: Guy Gibbs (WAC)
- Halftime show: UCLA Band, Band of the Hour
- Attendance: 60,310

United States TV coverage
- Network: NBC
- Announcers: Charlie Jones, Bob Griese
- Nielsen ratings: 7.9

The 1985 Fiesta Bowl was the fourteenth edition of the college football bowl game, played at Sun Devil Stadium in Tempe, Arizona, on Tuesday, January 1. Part of the 1984–85 bowl game season, it matched the fourteenth-ranked UCLA Bruins of the Pacific-10 Conference, and the #13 Miami Hurricanes, an independent.

At the time, it was the fourth highest-scoring Fiesta Bowl at 76 points. Miami was the defending national champion, but had four losses in the regular season under new head coach Jimmy Johnson. Underdog UCLA regained the lead in the final minute to win 39–37.

== Teams ==
=== UCLA ===
The Bruins had won consecutive Pac-10 championships and Rose Bowl games in their new home stadium in the 1982 and 1983 seasons. In the last game of the 1984 season, they defeated Pac-10 champions and Rose Bowl-bound USC for the third time in a row.

=== Miami ===
The Hurricanes were the defending national champions. Having defeated top-ranked Auburn, and then Florida, they rose to be ranked number one before their game at Michigan. They remained in the top ten after that loss. They lost again to Florida State. They beat ranked Notre Dame in South Bend to return to the top 10. The Hurricanes earned three more wins, but then suffered two of the most notable losses in college football history.

On November 10 at the Orange Bowl, the Maryland Terrapins defeated the Hurricanes with the largest (at that time) comeback in college football. Down 31–0 at halftime, Frank Reich, who had been injured, came off the bench and led the comeback. At the start of the third quarter, Reich led the Terrapins on multiple scoring drives. Three touchdowns in the third quarter and a fourth at the start of the final quarter turned what was a blowout into a close game. Maryland completed a 42–9 second half, and won 42–40.

The next week at Orange Bowl, the Hurricanes faced the Boston College Eagles in a nationally televised game that has become known as "Hail Flutie." It has been regarded by FOX Sports writer Kevin Hench as among the most memorable moments in sports. The game is most notable for a last-second Hail Mary pass from quarterback Doug Flutie to wide receiver Gerard Phelan to give Boston College the win.

== Game summary ==
The first game of a tripleheader (Rose, Orange) on NBC, the Fiesta kicked off shortly after 11:30 a.m. MST, as did the Cotton Bowl on CBS.

UCLA took an early lead off a six-yard touchdown run by freshman halfback Gaston Green. Miami responded following a 34-yard touchdown run by tailback Darryl Oliver, knotting the game at seven. Later in the quarter, All-American wide receiver Eddie Brown fielded a punt, and took it 68 yards for a Hurricane touchdown, giving Miami a 14–7 lead.

In the second quarter, quarterback Bernie Kosar threw a 48-yard touchdown pass to wide receiver Brian Blades to increase Miami's lead to 21–7. UCLA responded in a big way, riding a 72-yard touchdown run by Green to pull within 21–14. The defense continued the momentum by forcing a safety on punter Rick Tuten, bringing the score to 21–16. All-American kicker John Lee kicked two field goals of 51 and 33 yards to give UCLA a 22–21 lead at halftime.

Miami reclaimed the lead in the third quarter, after Greg Cox drilled a 31-yard field goal, putting them up 24–22. Bruin quarterback Steve Bono found wide receiver Mike Sherrard for a ten-yard touchdown pass to reclaim the lead for UCLA, 29–24.

In the fourth quarter, Bono found Mike Young for a 33-yard touchdown pass, increasing UCLA's lead to 36–24. Miami responded with a 19-yard touchdown run from running back Melvin Bratton. The attempted two-point conversion failed, leaving the score 36–30. Kosar later found Bratton on a three-yard slant pass, giving Miami a 37–36 lead. With 2:58 remaining, Bono moved the Bruins down the field. Lee scored the winning points on a 23-yard field goal, giving UCLA the 39–37 win. Miami mounted one last charge, but Terry Tumey forced a fumble after a sack of Kosar to seal the win. Green had 144 yards rushing on 21 attempts, and was named the game's offensive MVP

=== Scoring ===
First quarter

- UCLA – Gaston Green 6-yard run (John Lee kick)
- Miami – Darryl Oliver 34-yard run (Greg Cox kick)
- Miami – Eddie Brown 68-yard punt return (Cox kick)

Second quarter

- Miami – Brian Blades 48-yard pass from Bernie Kosar (Cox kick)
- UCLA – Green 72-yard run (Lee kick)
- UCLA – Safety: punter Rick Tuten tackled in end zone
- UCLA – Lee 51-yard field goal
- UCLA – Lee 33-yard field goal

Third quarter

- Miami – Cox 31-yard field goal
- UCLA – Mike Sherrard, 10-yard pass from Steve Bono (Lee kick)

Fourth quarter

- UCLA – Mike Young 33-yard pass from Bono (Lee kick)
- Miami – Melvin Bratton 19-yard run (Kosar pass failed)
- Miami – Bratton, three-yard pass from Kosar (Cox kick)
- UCLA – Lee 22-yard field goal

== Statistics ==
Statistics	UCLA	Miami
First downs	20	23
Yards rushing	44–161	33–129
Yards passing	243	294
Passing	18–27–0	31–44–1
Return yards	59	65
Total Offense	71–404	77–423
Punts–Average	7–37.6	6–37.0
Fumbles–Lost	2–0	3–1
Turnovers	0	2
Penalties–Yards	5–35	10–68
Time of Possession	26:25	33:35

== Aftermath ==
Three Pac-10 teams participated in New Year's Day bowl games, and all were victorious. #4 Washington won the Orange Bowl over #2 Oklahoma, and #18 USC won the Rose Bowl over #6 Ohio State. BYU of the Western Athletic Conference (WAC) was the lone undefeated team and was ranked first in the final AP poll, after handing unranked Michigan its sixth loss of the season in the Holiday Bowl on December 21. UCLA climbed to ninth and Miami fell to eighteenth.

== Bibliography ==
- UCLA Bruins football media guide (PDF copy available at www.uclabruins.com)
