= Jack Bicknell =

American football player and coach (born 1938)

Biographical details
- Born: February 20, 1938 (age 88); North Plainfield, New Jersey, U.S.

Playing career
- 1959: Montclair State
- Position: Quarterback

Coaching career (HC unless noted)
- 196?–1967: Governor Livingston HS (NJ)
- 1968–1975: Boston College (backfield)
- 1976–1980: Maine
- 1981–1990: Boston College
- 1991–2003: Barcelona Dragons
- 2004: Scottish Claymores
- 2005–2007: Hamburg Sea Devils

Head coaching record
- Overall: 77–90–2 (college); 71–74–1 (WLAF/NFL Europe); 28–6–2 (high school)

Jack Bicknell (born February 20, 1938) is a retired American football coach, most recently known for his long involvement in NFL Europa and its predecessor, the World League of American Football (WLAF). He served as the head football coach at the University of Maine from 1976 to 1980 and at Boston College from 1981 to 1988, compiling a career college football record of 77–90–2. In 1984, Bicknell coached his Boston College Eagles team to a 10–2 mark including a victory in the Cotton Bowl Classic. His quarterback that season, Doug Flutie, was awarded the Heisman Trophy.

A native of North Plainfield, New Jersey, Bicknell played quarterback at North Plainfield High School, graduating in 1955 and earning a scholarship to attend Rutgers University.

== Coaching career ==
=== College ===
Bicknell was the head football coach at the University of Maine from 1976 to 1980, earning an 18–35–1 record. After that, he went to coach at Boston College, where he stayed for ten years. At Boston College, he was 59–55–1, and was head coach in 1984 when Heisman Trophy-winner Doug Flutie completed his famous Hail Flutie pass to Gerard Phelan to beat the Miami Hurricanes as time expired. Bicknell's son, Jack Jr., was the center for BC at the time of Flutie's miracle pass.

=== NFL Europe ===
Bicknell was named the head coach of the Barcelona Dragons from their inception in 1991 to their demise after the 2003 season. In October 2003 he was named head coach of the Scottish Claymores, a franchise which in 2005 was relocated to Germany as Hamburg Sea Devils, as rival to the local semi-pro Hamburg Blue Devils which had won several German and European titles.

"Cowboy Jack" Bicknell has an overall record of 59–55 in his NFL Europe career. He made four World Bowl appearances, and had been to three title games in six years. In 1991, El Caballero led the Barcelona Dragons to an 8–2 mark and a berth in the playoffs for the first World Bowl after surprisingly defeating the unbeaten London Monarchs in Wembley, but got shut out by them two weeks later in World Bowl '91 itself. In 1997, his Dragons won the first half of the season and went on to win World Bowl '97 in Barcelona. In 1999, the Dragons posted a league-best 7–3 mark before losing to Frankfurt in the World Bowl. His team posted a league-best 8–2 record in 2001 before losing World Bowl IX to the Berlin Thunder in Amsterdam. On 28 March 2007, at age 69, Bicknell stepped down as head coach of the Hamburg Sea Devils, citing health issues as the reason for his resignation.

== Personal life ==
Bicknell is nicknamed "Cowboy Jack" because of his love for country music and horse riding. He and his wife, Lois, have three children, Jack, Jr., Wendy and Bob and five grandchildren. Both of his sons played for him at Boston College and are currently football coaches, Bob with the New England Patriots and Jack, Jr. with the Wisconsin Badgers.

== Head coaching record ==
=== College ===
Year	Team	Overall	Conference	Standing	Bowl/playoffs	Coaches^{#}	AP^{°}
Maine Black Bears (Yankee Conference) (1976–1980)
1976	Maine	6–5	2–3	T–3rd			
1977	Maine	3–7	1–4	T–3rd			
1978	Maine	3–7–1	0–4–1	6th			
1979	Maine	2–9	0–5	6th			
1980	Maine	4–7	1–4	5th			
Maine:		18–35–1	4–20–1				
Boston College Eagles (NCAA Division I-A independent) (1981–1990)
1981	Boston College	5–6					
1982	Boston College	8–3–1			L Tangerine		
1983	Boston College	9–3			L Liberty	20	19
1984	Boston College	10–2			W Cotton	4	5
1985	Boston College	4–8					
1986	Boston College	9–3			W Hall of Fame	18	19
1987	Boston College	5–6					
1988	Boston College	3–8					
1989	Boston College	2–9					
1990	Boston College	4–7					
Boston College:		59–55–1					
Total:		77–90–2					

=== Professional ===
Year	Team	Overall	Conference	Standing	Bowl/playoffs	Coaches^{#}	AP^{°}
Barcelona Dragons (WLAF) (1991–1992)
1991	Barcelona Dragons	8–2		2nd European	L 0–21 World Bowl I		
1992	Barcelona Dragons	5–5		1st European	L 15–17 WLAF Playoffs		
Barcelona Dragons (NFL Europe) (1995–2003)
1995	Barcelona Dragons	5–5		3rd			
1996	Barcelona Dragons	5–5		4th			
1997	Barcelona Dragons	5–5		4th	W 38–24 World Bowl V		
1998	Barcelona Dragons	4–6		4th			
1999	Barcelona Dragons	7–3		1st	L 24–38 World Bowl VII		
2000	Barcelona Dragons	5–5		3rd			
2001	Barcelona Dragons	8–2		1st	L 24–17 World Bowl IX		
2002	FC Barcelona Dragons	2–8		6th			
2003	FC Barcelona Dragons	5–5		4th			
Barcelona Dragons:		61–55					
Scottish Claymores (NFL Europe) (2004)
2004	Scottish Claymores	2–8		6th			
Scottish Claymores:		2–8					
Hamburg Sea Devils (NFL Europe) (2005–2006)
2005	Hamburg Sea Devils	5–5		4th			
2006	Hamburg Sea Devils	3–6–1		5th			
Hamburg Sea Devils:		8–11–1					
Total:		71–74–1					
