= Hail Flutie =

1984 college football play between Miami and Boston College

Boston College Eagles	Miami Hurricanes
(7–2)	(8–3)
Independent	Independent
47	45
Head coach: Jack Bicknell	Head coach: Jimmy Johnson
AP / Coaches; 10 / 10	AP / Coaches; 12 / 12
	1	2	3	4	Total
Boston College	14	14	3	16	47
Miami	7	14	10	14	45
- Date: November 23, 1984
- Season: 1984
- Stadium: Orange Bowl
- Location: Miami, Florida
- Favorite: Miami by 6 points
- Referee: Paul Schmitt (Southern Independent)
- Attendance: 30,235

United States TV coverage
- Network: CBS
- Announcers: Brent Musburger, Ara Parseghian, Pat Haden

The Hail Flutie game, also known as the Miracle in Miami, is a college football game in 1984 that took place between the Boston College Eagles and the Miami Hurricanes on November 23. FOX Sports writer Kevin Hench called it one of the most memorable moments in sports.

The game is remembered for its last-second Hail Mary pass from quarterback Doug Flutie to wide receiver Gerard Phelan, producing a walk-off touchdown and a victory for Boston College.

At the time, both teams were Independents. Miami was the defending national champion and entered the game with an 8–3 record, ranked twelfth in the nation. Boston College was ranked tenth with a record of 7–2 and had already accepted an invitation to the Cotton Bowl on New Year's Day. The game was played at the Orange Bowl in Miami, and televised nationally by CBS, with Brent Musburger, Ara Parseghian, and Pat Haden commentating.

During the game:

- Hurricanes quarterback Bernie Kosar passed for a school-record 447 yards, with two touchdowns.
- Miami running back Melvin Bratton ran for four touchdowns.
- Flutie passed for 472 yards and three touchdowns to become the first major college quarterback to surpass 10,000 yards passing in a career.
- Phelan caught 11 passes for 226 yards and two touchdowns.

== The game ==
Played on Friday, the day after Thanksgiving, it kicked off shortly after 2:30 p.m. EST; Miami was favored by six points.

Boston College jumped out to an early 14–0 lead in the first quarter before quarterback Bernie Kosar and Miami stormed back to tie. The two quarterbacks played phenomenal games, combining for 59–84, 919 yards, and five touchdown passes. At the end of three quarters, the game was tied at 31, and the fourth quarter had multiple lead changes. With 28 seconds left, Boston College trailed 45–41. Three quick plays gained 32 yards, taking the Eagles from their own 20-yard line to the Hurricanes' 48-yard line.

With six seconds on the game clock, Flutie called the "55 Flood Tip" play, which the receivers run straight routes into the end zone, then tip the football to another receiver. Flutie scrambled to his right, narrowly averting a sack. He threw the football from his own 37, requiring the 5 ft 10 in (1.78 m) quarterback to throw the ball at least 63 yards against 30 mph (50 km/h) winds, after having already thrown the football 45 times during the game.

The Miami defensive backs doubted his ability to throw the ball into the end zone, and paid no attention to Phelan as he ran behind them. The ball came straight down over the mass of players untouched into Phelan's arms for the 47–45 win.

=== Scoring ===
First quarter

- Boston College – Kelvin Martin 33-yard pass from Doug Flutie (Kevin Snow kick)
- Boston College – Ken Bell 5-yard run (Snow kick)
- Miami – Melvin Bratton 2-yard run (Greg Cox kick)

Second quarter

- Miami – Willie Smith 10-yard pass from Bernie Kosar (Cox kick)
- Boston College – Flutie 9-yard run (Snow kick)
- Miami – Warren Williams 8-yard pass from Kosar (Cox kick)
- Boston College – Gerard Phelan 10-yard pass from Flutie (Snow kick)

Third quarter

- Miami – Bratton 2-yard run (Cox kick)
- Miami – Cox 19-yard field goal
- Boston College – Snow 28-yard field goal

Fourth quarter

- Boston College – Snow 19-yard field goal
- Miami – Bratton 52-yard run (Cox kick)
- Boston College – Steve Strachan 1-yard run (Snow kick)
- Miami – Bratton 1-yard run (Cox kick)
- Boston College – Phelan 48-yard pass from Flutie (no conversion attempted)

== Statistics ==
Statistics	Boston College	Miami
First downs	30	32
Rushes–Yards	34–155	33–208
Passing yards	472	447
Passing	34–46–0	25–38–2
Total offense	80–627	71–655
Return yards	88	128
Punts–Average	3–32	1–45
Fumbles–Lost	2–1	5–1
Turnovers	1	3
Penalties–Yards	7–50	8–55
Time of possession	32:44	27:16

== Legacy ==
Flutie won the Heisman Trophy shortly afterward, the first quarterback chosen in 13 years. He later said, "Without the Hail Mary pass, I think I could have been very easily forgotten. We would have gone to the same bowl game, the Heisman voting was already in, and the direction [of his career], everything would have been the same, except that pass put this label on me as 'It's never over 'til it's over' guy."

A statue of Flutie was placed outside of Gate D of Alumni Stadium memorializing the play, and featuring the radio call on the side facing the stadium.

The game was placed in NCAA Football video games as a "College Classic," challenging players to recreate the ending. The scenario begins with the final play, forcing players to attempt the winning throw.

Some claimed that a great increase in applications to Boston College the year after this game was a result of this game. This has been called the Flutie Effect and has been used to describe other colleges that have received an increase in applications and exposure after the success of a college athletics team.

Boston College went on to win the Cotton Bowl; through 2026, it remains the program's most recent appearance in a major bowl game.

== Quotes from the play ==
CBS TV announcer Brent Musburger:

Three wide receivers out to the right...Flutie flushed...throws it down...CAUGHT BY BOSTON COLLEGE, I DON'T BELIEVE IT! It's a touchdown! The Eagles win it! (Unbelievable!) I don't believe it! Phelan is at the bottom of that pile! Here comes the Boston College team! He threw it into the endzone! There was no time left on the clock! The ball went between two defensive backs of Miami! Jack Bicknell is the only person over there on the sidelines, he couldn't get the headset off fast enough!

Boston College radio announcer Dan Davis:

Here we go...here's your ballgame, folks, as Flutie takes the snap. He drops straight back...has some time, now scrambles away from one hit...looks...uncorks a deep one to the end zone, Phelan is down there...(Statistician Dick Tarpey: OH, HE GOT IT!) DID HE GET IT? (Tarpey: HE GOT IT!) TOUCHDOWN!! TOUCHDOWN!! TOUCHDOWN!! TOUCHDOWN!! TOUCHDOWN BOSTON COLLEGE!! HE DID IT!! HE DID IT!! FLUTIE DID IT!! HE GOT PHELAN IN THE END ZONE!! TOUCHDOWN!! OH MY GOODNESS...WHAT A PLAY!! FLUTIE TO GERARD PHELAN!! 48 YARDS!! NO TIME ON THE CLOCK, IT'S ALL OVER!!

== See also ==
- List of historically significant college football games
- List of nicknamed college football games and plays
