= 1984 All-Southwest Conference football team =

American college football all-star team

The 1984 All-Southwest Conference football team consists of American football players chosen by various organizations for All-Southwest Conference teams for the 1984 NCAA Division I-A football season. The selectors for the 1984 season included the Associated Press (AP).

== Offensive selections ==
=== Quarterbacks ===
- Don King, SMU (AP-1)

=== Running backs ===
- Kenneth Davis, TCU (AP-1)
- Reggie Dupard, SMU (AP-1)

=== Tight ends ===
- Dan Sharp, TCU (AP-1)

=== Wide receivers ===
- James Maness, TCU (AP-1)
- James Shibest, Arkansas (AP-1)

=== Centers ===
- Chris Jackson, SMU (AP-1)

=== Offensive line ===
- James Benson, TCU (AP-1)
- Dale Hellestrae, SMU (AP-1)
- Marcus Elliott, Arkansas (AP-1)
- Andrew Campbell, SMU (AP-1)

== Defensive selections ==
=== Defensive lineman ===
- Ray Childress, Texas A&M (AP-1)
- T. J. Turner, Houston (AP-1)
- Jerry Ball, SMU (AP-1)
- Tony Degrate, Texas (AP-1)

=== Linebackers ===
- Ervin Randle, Baylor (AP-1)
- Dwayne Jiles, Texas Tech (AP-1)
- Anthony Beverly, SMU (AP-1)

=== Secondary ===
- Jerry Gray, Texas (AP-1)
- Sean Thomas, TCU (AP-1)
- Byron Linwood, TCU (AP-1)
- Kevin Wyatt, Arkansas (AP-1)
- Audray McMillian, Houston (AP-1)

== Special teams ==
=== Place-kickers ===
- Jeff Ward, Texas (AP-1)

== Key ==
AP = Associated Press
