= 1984 Texas A&M Aggies football team =

American college football season

1984 Texas A&M Aggies football
- Conference: Southwest Conference
- Record: 6–5 (3–5 SWC)
- Head coach: Jackie Sherrill (3rd season)
- Offensive coordinator: Pat Ruel (3rd season)
- Offensive scheme: Pro set
- Defensive coordinator: R. C. Slocum (5th season)
- Base defense: 3–4
- Home stadium: Kyle Field

1984 Southwest Conference football standings
	Conf.					Overall
Team	W		L		T	W		L		T
No. 8 SMU +	6	–	2	–	0	10	–	2	–	0
Houston +	6	–	2	–	0	7	–	5	–	0
TCU	5	–	3	–	0	8	–	4	–	0
Arkansas	5	–	3	–	0	7	–	4	–	1
Texas	5	–	3	–	0	7	–	4	–	1
Baylor	4	–	4	–	0	5	–	6	–	0
Texas A&M	3	–	5	–	0	6	–	5	–	0
Texas Tech	2	–	6	–	0	4	–	7	–	0
Rice	0	–	8	–	0	1	–	10	–	0
+ – Conference co-champions; Rankings from AP Poll

The 1984 Texas A&M Aggies football team represented Texas A&M University as a member of the Southwest Conference (SWC) during the 1984 NCAA Division I-A football season. Led by third-year head coach Jackie Sherrill, the Aggies compiled an overall record of 6–5 with a mark of 3–5 in conference play, placing seventh in the SWC. Texas A&M played home games at Kyle Field in College Station, Texas.

== Schedule ==
Date	Opponent	Site	TV	Result	Attendance	Source
September 1	UTEP*	Kyle Field; College Station, TX		W 20–17	42,658	
September 22	Iowa State*	Kyle Field; College Station, TX	Raycom	W 38–17	45,239	
September 29	No. 9 (I-AA) Arkansas State*	Kyle Field; College Station, TX		W 22–21	45,282	
October 6	Texas Tech	Kyle Field; College Station, TX (rivalry)	Raycom	L 12–30	51,365	
October 13	at Houston	Houston Astrodome; Houston, TX		L 7–9	34,103	
October 20	Baylor	Kyle Field; College Station, TX (rivalry)		L 16–20	54,618	
October 27	Rice	Kyle Field; College Station, TX		W 38–14	43,108	
November 3	at No. 19 SMU	Texas Stadium; Irving, TX		L 20–28	47,113	
November 17	at Arkansas	Razorback Stadium; Fayetteville, AR (rivalry)	Raycom	L 0–28	38,020	
November 24	No. 17 TCU	Kyle Field; College Station, TX (rivalry)		W 35–21	38,209	
December 1	at No. 13 Texas	Texas Memorial Stadium; Austin, TX (rivalry)	ESPN	W 37–12	81,309	
*Non-conference game; Rankings from AP Poll released prior to the game

== Roster ==
1984 Texas A&M Aggies football team roster
Players			Coaches
Offense: Pos. / # / Name / Class; QB / / Kevin Murray / So	Defense: Pos. / # / Name / Class; LB / 11 / Johnny Holland / So	Special teams: Pos. / # / Name / Class	Head coach: Jackie Sherrill; Coordinators/assistant coaches: George Pugh – Assistant; Legend: (C) Team captain; (S) Suspended; (I) Ineligible; Injured; Redshirt
