= Dan Sharp =

American football player and coach (born 1962)

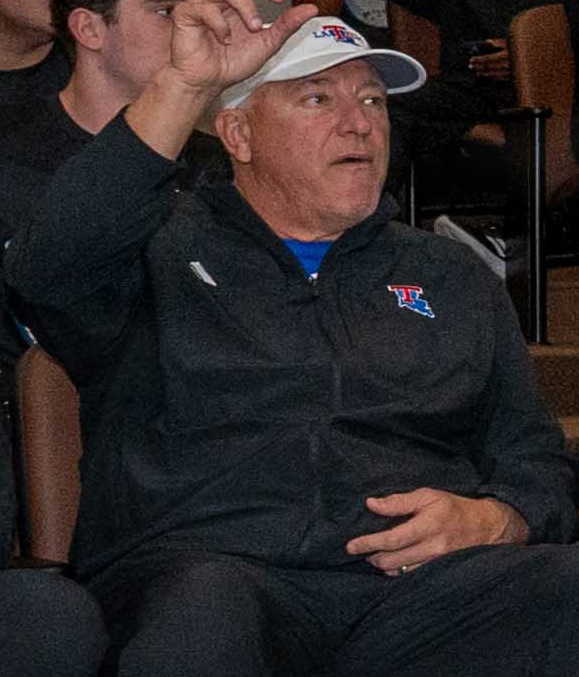
- Sharp in 2025

Louisiana Tech Bulldogs
- Title: Special teams coordinator

Personal information
- Born: February 5, 1962 (age 64); Boerne, Texas, U.S.
- Listed height: 6 ft 2 in (1.88 m)
- Listed weight: 235 lb (107 kg)

Career information
- High school: Boerne
- College: TCU
- NFL draft: 1985: 8th round, 223rd overall pick

Career history

Playing
- Miami Dolphins (1985)*; Atlanta Falcons (1987)
- * Offseason or practice squad member only

Coaching
- TCU (1988–1990) Graduate assistant; TCU (1991) Defensive ends coach; TCU (1991–1996) Tight ends coach; TCU (1997) Defensive ends coach; Tulsa (1998–2000) Tight ends coach/special teams coordinator; TCU (2001–2014) Tight ends coach/special teams coordinator; TCU (2015–2021) Defensive line coach/special teams coordinator; Louisiana Tech (2022–present) Special teams coordinator

Awards and highlights
- First-team All-SWC (1984)

Career NFL statistics
- Receptions: 2
- Receiving yards: 6
- Return yards: 11
- Stats at Pro Football Reference

Daniel Ira Sharp (born February 5, 1962) is an American former professional football player who was a tight end for the Atlanta Falcons of the National Football League (NFL). He played college football for the TCU Horned Frogs. He was selected by the Miami Dolphins in the eighth round of the 1985 NFL draft with the 223rd overall pick.
