= Don King (defensive back) =

American football player (born 1964)

No. 17, 32
- Position: Defensive back

Personal information
- Born: February 10, 1964 (age 62); Dallas, Texas, U.S.
- Listed height: 6 ft 0 in (1.83 m)
- Listed weight: 200 lb (91 kg)

Career information
- High school: Justin F. Kimball (Dallas)
- College: SMU (1982–1985)
- NFL draft: 1986: undrafted

Career history
- Kansas City Chiefs (1986)*; Green Bay Packers (1987)
- * Offseason or practice squad member only

Awards and highlights
- First-team All-SWC (1984)
- Stats at Pro Football Reference

Don Erwin King Jr. (born February 10, 1964) is an American former professional football player who was a defensive back in the National Football League (NFL). He played college football as a quarterback for the SMU Mustangs, where he was an All-Southwest Conference (SWC) selection in 1984. After college, he converted to defensive back and had a brief stint with the Kansas City Chiefs before joining the Green Bay Packers in 1987. He appeared in one game for the Packers as a replacement player during the 1987 NFL strike.

== Early life ==
King was born on February 10, 1964, in Dallas, Texas. He attended Justin F. Kimball High School in Dallas, where he played football as a quarterback. He graduated from Kimball in 1982. Coming out of high school, he was ranked one of the top-100 recruits in Texas and the 16th-best quarterback in the state. He committed to play college football for the SMU Mustangs.

== College career ==
King attended SMU from 1982 to 1985, receiving varsity letters in all four years. He impressed the team with his throwing and running ability, but spent his first two years as backup to Lance McIlhenny, who led the Mustangs to a record of 34–5–1 during his tenure. As backup, King appeared in only seven games and recorded 13 pass attempts across two years. In 1984, he succeeded McIlhenny, SMU's all-time wins leader, as the starting quarterback for the Mustangs. In his first start, he led SMU to 469 yards of offense in a 41–7 win against Louisville. Four games in, he was leading the conference in several categories and by the end of the season he had helped SMU to record of 10–2.

King finished the season having completed 93 of 177 pass attempts for 1,598 yards, eight touchdowns, and six interceptions, as SMU won the Southwestern Conference (SWC) title, the 1984 Aloha Bowl, and finished with a ranking of eighth in the nation as selected by the Associated Press. King ranked first in the SWC in completion percentage (52.5%), yards per attempt (9), passing efficiency rating (136.5), total yards (2,019) and yards per completion (17.2), with his yards per attempt and yards per completion being the best marks nationally. He also ran for 421 yards and four touchdowns, being named All-SWC for his performance. He remained starter as a senior in 1985 and led the Mustangs to a record of 6–5, completing 107 of 209 pass attempts for 1,386 yards and five touchdowns to six interceptions. He was top 10 in the SWC in completions, passing yards, and passing touchdowns, while also running for 191 yards in the season.

== Professional career and personal life ==
After going unselected in the 1986 NFL draft, King signed with the Kansas City Chiefs as an undrafted free agent to play defensive back, although he was released in August, prior to the regular season. On September 23, 1987, he signed with the Green Bay Packers as a replacement player during the 1987 NFL strike. He made his NFL debut in the team's Week 5 game against the Detroit Lions but saw no further playing time and was placed on injured reserve on October 19. He initially returned to the team for the 1988 season, but was released on July 22, ending his professional career. King had a son, Don III, who played in college as a quarterback for Slippery Rock.
