= 1984 Baylor Bears football team =

American college football season

1984 Baylor Bears football
- Conference: Southwest Conference
- Record: 5–6 (4–4 SWC)
- Head coach: Grant Teaff (13th season)
- Offensive coordinator: Duke Christian (6th season)
- Offensive scheme: I formation
- Defensive coordinator: Pete Fredenburg (2nd season)
- Base defense: 4–4
- Home stadium: Baylor Stadium

1984 Southwest Conference football standings
	Conf.					Overall
Team	W		L		T	W		L		T
No. 8 SMU +	6	–	2	–	0	10	–	2	–	0
Houston +	6	–	2	–	0	7	–	5	–	0
TCU	5	–	3	–	0	8	–	4	–	0
Arkansas	5	–	3	–	0	7	–	4	–	1
Texas	5	–	3	–	0	7	–	4	–	1
Baylor	4	–	4	–	0	5	–	6	–	0
Texas A&M	3	–	5	–	0	6	–	5	–	0
Texas Tech	2	–	6	–	0	4	–	7	–	0
Rice	0	–	8	–	0	1	–	10	–	0
+ – Conference co-champions; Rankings from AP Poll

The 1984 Baylor Bears football team represented Baylor University as a member of the Southwest Conference (SWC) during the 1984 NCAA Division I-A football season. Led by 13th-year head coach Grant Teaff, the Bears compiled an overall record of 5–6 with a mark of 4–4 in conference play, placing sixth the SWC. The team played home games at Baylor Stadium in Waco, Texas.

== Schedule ==
Date	Opponent	Site	TV	Result	Attendance	Source
September 8	at No. 13 BYU*	Cougar Stadium; Provo, UT		L 13–47	63,705	
September 22	at No. 11 Oklahoma*	Oklahoma Memorial Stadium; Norman, OK		L 15–34	75,018	
September 29	at Texas Tech	Jones Stadium; Lubbock, TX (rivalry)		W 18–9	41,328	
October 6	Houston	Baylor Stadium; Waco, TX (rivalry)		L 17–27	34,500	
October 13	No. 7 SMU	Baylor Stadium; Waco, TX		L 20–24	26,400	
October 20	at Texas A&M	Kyle Field; College Station, TX (rivalry)		W 20–16	54,618	
October 27	at TCU	Amon G. Carter Stadium; Fort Worth, TX (rivalry)		L 28–38	23,885	
November 3	New Mexico*	Baylor Stadium; Waco, TX		W 38–2	26,000	
November 10	Arkansas^{†}	Baylor Stadium; Waco, TX		L 9–14	43,500	
November 17	at Rice	Rice Stadium; Houston, TX		W 46–40	11,125	
November 24	No. 6 Texas	Baylor Stadium; Waco, TX (rivalry)	Raycom/USA	W 24–10	33,500	
*Non-conference game; ^{†}Homecoming; Rankings from AP Poll released prior to the game

== Team players drafted into the NFL ==
The following player was drafted into professional football following the season.

Player	Position	Round	Pick	Franchise
Pat Coryatt	Defensive tackle	10	273	Chicago Bears
