= 1984 Rice Owls football team =

American college football season

1984 Rice Owls football
- Conference: Southwest Conference
- Record: 1–10 (0–8 SWC)
- Head coach: Watson Brown (1st season)
- Defensive coordinator: Dick Hopkins (1st season)
- Home stadium: Rice Stadium

1984 Southwest Conference football standings
	Conf.					Overall
Team	W		L		T	W		L		T
No. 8 SMU +	6	–	2	–	0	10	–	2	–	0
Houston +	6	–	2	–	0	7	–	5	–	0
TCU	5	–	3	–	0	8	–	4	–	0
Arkansas	5	–	3	–	0	7	–	4	–	1
Texas	5	–	3	–	0	7	–	4	–	1
Baylor	4	–	4	–	0	5	–	6	–	0
Texas A&M	3	–	5	–	0	6	–	5	–	0
Texas Tech	2	–	6	–	0	4	–	7	–	0
Rice	0	–	8	–	0	1	–	10	–	0
+ – Conference co-champions; Rankings from AP Poll

The 1984 Rice Owls football team was an American football team that represented Rice University in the Southwest Conference during the 1984 NCAA Division I-A football season. In their first year under head coach Watson Brown, the team compiled a 1–10 record.

== Schedule ==
Date	Opponent	Site	Result	Attendance	Source
September 8	at Minnesota*	Metrodome; Minneapolis, MN	L 24–31	50,576	
September 22	Lamar*	Rice Stadium; Houston, TX	W 36–19	18,537	
September 29	at No. 16 Miami (FL)*	Miami Orange Bowl; Miami, FL	L 3–38	20,084	
October 6	No. 1 Texas	Rice Stadium; Houston, TX (rivalry)	L 13–38	56,047	
October 13	at TCU	Amon G. Carter Stadium; Fort Worth, TX	L 24–45	22,612	
October 20	Texas Tech	Rice Stadium; Houston, TX	L 10–30	13,105	
October 27	at Texas A&M	Kyle Field; College Station, TX	L 14–38	43,108	
November 3	at Arkansas	War Memorial Stadium; Little Rock, AR	L 6–28	54,290	
November 10	No. 17 SMU	Rice Stadium; Houston, TX (rivalry)	L 17–31	15,692	
November 17	Baylor	Rice Stadium; Houston, TX	L 40–46	11,125	
December 1	at Houston	Houston Astrodome; Houston, TX (rivalry)	L 26–38	30,123	
*Non-conference game; Rankings from AP Poll released prior to the game
