= Sean Thomas (American football) =

American football player (born 1962)

No. 24, 22
- Position: Defensive back

Personal information
- Born: April 12, 1962 (age 64); Sacramento, California, U.S.
- Listed height: 5 ft 11 in (1.80 m)
- Listed weight: 190 lb (86 kg)

Career information
- High school: Luther Burbank (Sacramento)
- College: TCU
- NFL draft: 1985: 3rd round, 70th overall pick

Career history
- Cincinnati Bengals (1985); Atlanta Falcons (1985); San Francisco 49ers (1986–1987)

Awards and highlights
- First-team All-SWC (1984)
- Stats at Pro Football Reference

Sean Thomas (born April 12, 1962) is an American former professional football defensive back who played in the National Football League (NFL) with the Cincinnati Bengals and Atlanta Falcons. He played college football for the TCU Horned Frogs and was selected by the Bengals in the third round of the 1985 NFL draft.

== Early life ==
Sean Thomas was born on April 12, 1962, in Sacramento, California. He attended Luther Burbank High School in Sacramento.

== College career ==
Thomas played junior college football at Sacramento City College in 1981. He transferred to Texas Christian University, where he was a three-year letterman from 1982 to 1984. As a senior in 1984, he led the Southwest Conference (SWC) with eight interceptions (also the second best in the entire country). Thomas recorded four forced fumbles and ten pass breakups as well, earning Associated Press first-team All-SWC honors for his performance during the 1984 season. He finished his college career with ten interceptions in total.

== Professional career ==
Thomas was selected by the Bengals in the third round, with the 70th overall pick, of the 1985 NFL draft. The Cincinnati Enquirer said that Thomas was one of the most muscular cornerbacks in the draft, but slow with only a 4.6 second 40-yard dash. He signed with the team on May 30. He was released on September 2 but re-signed the next day. Thomas played in the first five games of the 1985 season as a reserve cornerback/safety before being released again on October 8.

Thomas signed with the Atlanta Falcons on November 13, 1985. He played in the final six regular season games for Atlanta as a backup cornerback/safety. He was released on July 22, 1986.

Thomas was signed by the San Francisco 49ers on August 4, 1986. He was released on August 19 after the second game of the 1986 preseason. On November 14, he signed a reserve/future contract with the 49ers for the 1987 season. Thomas was placed on injured reserve on August 29, 1987, missing the entire 1987 season. He was released by the 49ers on July 23, 1988, after failing a physical.
