= List of Boston College Eagles bowl games =

The Boston College Eagles college football team competes as part of the National Collegiate Athletic Association (NCAA) Division I Football Bowl Subdivision (FBS), representing Boston College in the Atlantic Division of the Atlantic Coast Conference (ACC). Since the establishment of the team in 1892, Boston College has appeared in 29 bowl games. Included in these games are 4 combined appearances in the traditional "major" bowl games (the Rose, Sugar, Cotton, Fiesta, and Orange), all of which came in their first six bowl appearances. Their victory in the 1941 Sugar Bowl over Tennessee gave Boston College a claim on the national championship, having received votes from various selectors. However, the NCAA only lists Minnesota as having won that year.

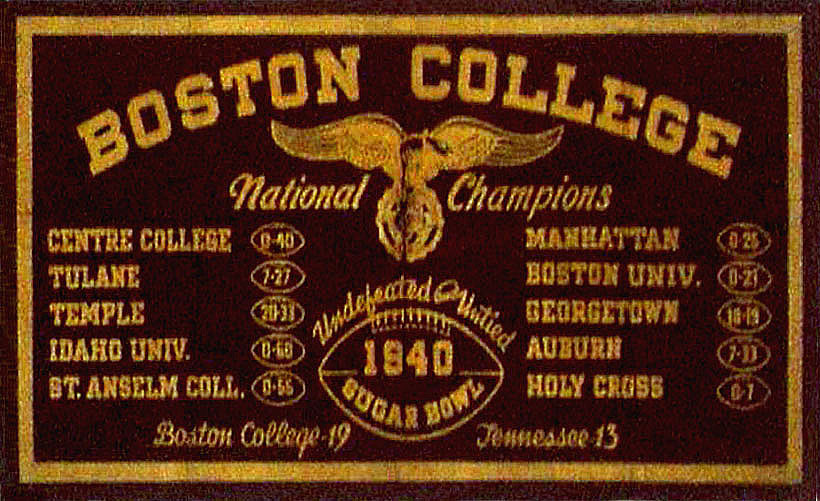
1940 banner

BC's 15-13 bowl record in 29 bowl games (with one no-contest) place the school tied for 38th in all-time bowl wins.

== Bowl games ==
List of bowl games showing bowl played in, score, date, season, opponent, stadium, and location (Note: Statistics correct as of 2010–11 NCAA football bowl games.)
#	Season	Bowl	Score	Date	Opponent	Stadium	Location
1	1939	1940 Cotton Bowl Classic	L 3–6	January 1, 1940	Clemson Tigers	Cotton Bowl	Dallas, TX
2	1940	1941 Sugar Bowl	W 19–13	January 1, 1941	Tennessee Volunteers	Tulane Stadium	New Orleans, LA
3	1942	1943 Orange Bowl	L 21–37	January 1, 1943	Alabama Crimson Tide	Burdine Stadium	Miami, FL
4	1982	1982 Tangerine Bowl	L 26–33	December 18, 1982	Auburn Tigers	Citrus Bowl	Orlando, FL
5	1983	1983 Liberty Bowl	L 19–18	December 29, 1983	Notre Dame Fighting Irish	Liberty Bowl	Memphis, TN
6	1984	1985 Cotton Bowl	W 45–28	January 1, 1985	Houston Cougars	Cotton Bowl	Dallas, TX
7	1986	1986 Hall of Fame Bowl	W 27–24	December 23, 1986	Georgia Bulldogs	Tampa Stadium	Tampa, FL
8	1992	1993 Hall of Fame Bowl	L 23–38	January 1, 1993	Tennessee Volunteers	Tampa Stadium	Tampa, FL
9	1993	1994 Carquest Bowl	W 31–13	January 1, 1994	Virginia Cavaliers	Joe Robbie Stadium	Miami, FL
10	1994	1994 Aloha Bowl	W 12–7	December 25, 1994	Kansas State Wildcats	Aloha Stadium	Honolulu, HI
11	1999	1999 Insight.com Bowl	L 28–62	December 31, 1999	Colorado Buffaloes	Sun Devil Stadium	Tempe, AZ
12	2000	2000 Aloha Bowl	W 31–17	December 25, 2000	Arizona State Sun Devils	Aloha Stadium	Honolulu, HI
13	2001	2001 Music City Bowl	W 20–16	December 28, 2001	Georgia Bulldogs	LP Field	Nashville, TN
14	2002	2002 Motor City Bowl	W 51–25	December 26, 2002	Toledo Rockets	Ford Field	Detroit, MI
15	2003	2003 San Francisco Bowl	W 35–21	December 31, 2003	Colorado State Rams	AT&T Park	San Francisco, CA
16	2004	2004 Continental Tire Bowl	W 37–24	December 30, 2004	North Carolina Tar Heels	Bank of America Stadium	Charlotte, NC
17	2005	2005 MPC Computers Bowl	W 27–21	December 28, 2005	Boise State Broncos	Bronco Stadium	Boise, ID
18	2006	2006 Meineke Car Care Bowl	W 25–24	December 30, 2006	Navy Midshipmen	Bank of America Stadium	Charlotte, NC
19	2007	2007 Champs Sports Bowl	W 24–21	December 28, 2007	Michigan State Spartans	Citrus Bowl	Orlando, FL
20	2008	2008 Music City Bowl	L 14–16	December 31, 2008	Vanderbilt Commodores	LP Field	Nashville, TN
21	2009	2009 Emerald Bowl	L 13–24	December 26, 2009	USC Trojans	AT&T Park	San Francisco, CA
22	2010	2011 Kraft Fight Hunger Bowl	L 13–20	January 9, 2011	Nevada Wolf Pack	AT&T Park	San Francisco, CA
23	2013	2013 AdvoCare V100 Bowl	L 19–42	December 31, 2013	Arizona Wildcats	Independence Stadium	Shreveport, LA
24	2014	2014 Pinstripe Bowl	L 30–31^{OT}	December 27, 2014	Penn State Nittany Lions	Yankee Stadium	Bronx, NY
25	2016	2016 Quick Lane Bowl	W 36–30	December 26, 2016	Maryland Terrapins	Ford Field	Detroit, MI
26	2017	2017 Pinstripe Bowl	L 20–27	December 27, 2017	Iowa Hawkeyes	Yankee Stadium	Bronx, NY
27	2018	2018 First Responder Bowl	No Contest^{†}	December 26, 2018	Boise State Broncos	Cotton Bowl	Dallas, TX
28	2019	2020 Birmingham Bowl	L 6–38	January 2, 2020	Cincinnati Bearcats	Legion Field	Birmingham, AL
29	2021	2021 Military Bowl	Cancelled^{‡}	December 27, 2021	East Carolina Pirates	Navy–Marine Corps Memorial Stadium	Annapolis, MD
30	2023	2023 Fenway Bowl	W 23–14	December 28, 2023	SMU Mustangs	Fenway Park	Boston, MA
31	2024	2024 Pinstripe Bowl	L 15–20	December 28, 2024	Nebraska Cornhuskers	Yankee Stadium	New York City, NY

† After Boston College led 7–0 in first quarter, the 2018 First Responder Bowl was delayed and eventually canceled due to dangerous lightning strikes. It is considered a no-contest for both teams.
‡ The 2021 Military Bowl was cancelled the day before it was scheduled, due to a large number COVID-19 cases within the Boston College program.
