= 1984 Texas Tech Red Raiders football team =

American college football season

1984 Texas Tech Red Raiders football
- Conference: Southwest Conference
- Record: 4–7 (2–6 SWC)
- Head coach: Jerry Moore (4th season)
- Offensive coordinator: Tom Wilson (1st season)
- Offensive scheme: I formation
- Defensive coordinator: Spike Dykes (1st season)
- Base defense: 4–3
- Home stadium: Jones Stadium

1984 Southwest Conference football standings
	Conf.					Overall
Team	W		L		T	W		L		T
No. 8 SMU +	6	–	2	–	0	10	–	2	–	0
Houston +	6	–	2	–	0	7	–	5	–	0
TCU	5	–	3	–	0	8	–	4	–	0
Arkansas	5	–	3	–	0	7	–	4	–	1
Texas	5	–	3	–	0	7	–	4	–	1
Baylor	4	–	4	–	0	5	–	6	–	0
Texas A&M	3	–	5	–	0	6	–	5	–	0
Texas Tech	2	–	6	–	0	4	–	7	–	0
Rice	0	–	8	–	0	1	–	10	–	0
+ – Conference co-champions; Rankings from AP Poll

The 1984 Texas Tech Red Raiders football team represented Texas Tech University as a member of the Southwest Conference (SWC) during the 1984 NCAA Division I-A football season. In their fourth season under head coach Jerry Moore, the Red Raiders compiled a 4–7 record (2–6 against SWC opponents), were outscored by a combined total of 212 to 200, and finished in eighth place in the conference. The team played its home games at Clifford B. and Audrey Jones Stadium in Lubbock, Texas.

== Schedule ==
Date	Opponent	Site	TV	Result	Attendance	Source
September 15	UT Arlington*	Jones Stadium; Lubbock, TX		W 44–7	35,121	
September 22	at New Mexico*	University Stadium; Albuquerque, NM		L 24–29	24,529	
September 29	Baylor^{†}	Jones Stadium; Lubbock, TX (rivalry)		L 9–18	41,328	
October 6	at Texas A&M	Kyle Field; College Station, TX (rivalry)	Raycom	W 30–12	51,365	
October 13	at Arkansas	War Memorial Stadium; Little Rock, AR (rivalry)		L 0–24	54,986	
October 20	at Rice	Rice Stadium; Houston, TX		W 30–10	13,105	
October 27	Tulsa*	Jones Stadium; Lubbock, TX		W 20–17	34,624	
November 3	No. 2 Texas	Jones Stadium; Lubbock, TX (rivalry)	HSE	L 10–13	50,722	
November 10	at No. 15 TCU	Amon G. Carter Stadium; Fort Worth, TX (rivalry)		L 16–27	34,075	
November 17	No. 16 SMU	Jones Stadium; Lubbock, TX		L 0–31	31,864	
November 24	Houston	Jones Stadium; Lubbock, TX (rivalry)		L 17–24	27,373	
*Non-conference game; ^{†}Homecoming; Rankings from AP Poll released prior to the game
