= 1984 SMU Mustangs football team =

American college football season

1984 SMU Mustangs football

SWC co-champion Aloha Bowl champion

Aloha Bowl, W 27–20 vs. Notre Dame
- Conference: Southwest Conference

Ranking
- Coaches: No. 8
- AP: No. 8
- Record: 10–2 (6–2 SWC)
- Head coach: Bobby Collins (3rd season)
- Offensive scheme: No-huddle option
- Defensive coordinator: Bill Clay (3rd season)
- Base defense: 3–4
- Home stadium: Texas Stadium

1984 Southwest Conference football standings
	Conf.					Overall
Team	W		L		T	W		L		T
No. 8 SMU +	6	–	2	–	0	10	–	2	–	0
Houston +	6	–	2	–	0	7	–	5	–	0
TCU	5	–	3	–	0	8	–	4	–	0
Arkansas	5	–	3	–	0	7	–	4	–	1
Texas	5	–	3	–	0	7	–	4	–	1
Baylor	4	–	4	–	0	5	–	6	–	0
Texas A&M	3	–	5	–	0	6	–	5	–	0
Texas Tech	2	–	6	–	0	4	–	7	–	0
Rice	0	–	8	–	0	1	–	10	–	0
+ – Conference co-champions; Rankings from AP Poll

The 1984 SMU Mustangs football team represented Southern Methodist University (SMU) as a member of the Southwest Conference (SWC) during the 1984 NCAA Division I-A football season. Led by third-year head coach Bobby Collins, the Mustangs compiled an overall record 10–2 with a mark of 6–2 in conference play, sharing the SWC title with Houston and marking the third time in four years that SMU had at least a share of the title. This was the last year the Mustangs would win a conference title until 2023 when they won the American Athletic Conference title.

While Houston, who beat SMU, received a bid to the Cotton Bowl Classic, the Mustangs were invited to play in the Aloha Bowl, where they defeated Notre Dame, 27–20. SMU finished the season ranked No. 8 in both the major polls.

1984 marked SMU's fourth consecutive ten-win season. The Mustangs did not make another bowl game appearance until the 2009 season.

== Schedule ==
Date	Opponent	Rank	Site	Result	Attendance	Source
September 15	at Louisville*	No. 14	Cardinal Stadium; Louisville, KY	W 41–7	26,589	
September 22	North Texas State*	No. 13	Texas Stadium; Irving, TX (rivalry)	W 24–6	27,124	
September 29	TCU	No. 11	Texas Stadium; Irving, TX (rivalry)	W 26–17	58,206	
October 13	at Baylor	No. 7	Baylor Stadium; Waco, TX	W 24–20	26,400	
October 20	Houston	No. 6	Texas Stadium; Irving, TX (rivalry)	L 20–29	28,361	
October 27	at No. 3 Texas	No. 14	Texas Memorial Stadium; Austin, TX	L 7–13	80,759	
November 3	Texas A&M	No. 19	Texas Stadium; Irving, TX	W 28–20	47,113	
November 10	at Rice	No. 17	Rice Stadium; Houston, TX (rivalry)	W 31–17	15,692	
November 17	at Texas Tech	No. 16	Jones Stadium; Lubbock, TX	W 31–0	31,864	
November 24	Arkansas	No. 11	Texas Stadium; Irving, TX	W 31–28	28,712	
December 1	at UNLV*	No. 10	Sam Boyd Silver Bowl; Whitney, NV	W 38–21	22,639	
December 29	vs. No. 17 Notre Dame*	No. 10	Aloha Stadium; Halawa, HI (Aloha Bowl)	W 27–20	41,777	
*Non-conference game; Rankings from AP Poll released prior to the game

== Roster ==
1984 SMU Mustangs football team roster
Players
Coaches
Offense

Pos.	#	Name	Class
RB	21	Reggie Dupard	Jr
OT	70	Dale Hellestrae	Sr
QB	2	Don King	Jr

Defense

Pos.	#	Name	Class
CB	1	Rod Jones	Jr
FS	17	Tim Green	Jr
LB		Ben Hummel	Fr
CB	5	Reggie Phillips	Sr

Special teams

Pos.	#	Name	Class

Head coach

- Bobby Collins

Coordinators/assistant coaches

Legend

- (C) Team captain
- (S) Suspended
- (I) Ineligible
- Injured
- Redshirt

== Team players in the NFL ==
Player	Position	Round	Pick	NFL club
Reggie Phillips	Cornerback	2	49	Chicago Bears
Dale Hellestrae	Tackle	4	112	Buffalo Bills
Ron Anderson	Linebacker	10	278	Denver Broncos
Chris Jackson	Center	11	293	Kansas City Chiefs
