= 1984 Astro-Bluebonnet Bowl =

West Virginia Mountaineers	TCU Horned Frogs
(7–4)	(8–3)
31	14
Head coach: Don Nehlen	Head coach: Jim Wacker
	1	2	3	4	Total
West Virginia	14	17	0	0	31
TCU	7	0	0	7	14
- Date: December 31, 1984
- Season: 1984
- Stadium: Houston Astrodome
- Location: Houston, Texas
- Referee: DIck Burleson (SEC)
- Attendance: 43,260

The 1984 Bluebonnet Bowl was a college football postseason bowl game between the TCU Horned Frogs and the West Virginia Mountaineers.

== Background ==
This was West Virginia's fourth straight bowl appearance and first Bluebonnet Bowl. They started off well, winning their first three games and at one point ranked 12th in the polls before losing their last three games. TCU improved seven games from last season under Wacker in his second season, in their first bowl appearance since 1965. The Frogs also enjoyed their first winning season since 1971.

== Game summary ==
West Virginia and TCU both scored touchdowns on their first drives, then traded punts. On their 3rd drive, West Virginia scored on a 62-yard touchdown pass to Gary Mullen. The Horned Frogs then suffered from the loss of All-American running back Kenneth Davis to a knee injury at the end of the 1st quarter, and they trailed 31–7 at halftime. TCU scored in the second half just once, as West Virginia's 302 passing yard attack overwhelmed a team lacking a rush attack. However, Anthony Gulley finished with 150 yards passing for the Frogs, with touchdown passes to Dan Sharp and Keith Burnett. Willie Drewery had six catches and 152 yards for West Virginia.

== Aftermath ==
The Mountaineers would return to a bowl game three years later, but wouldn't win one until 2000. TCU did not make a bowl game again under Wacker, waiting 10 years for their next bowl game appearance, and 14 for a bowl win. Both would join the Big XII together in 2012.

== Statistics ==
Statistics	TCU	WVU
First downs	15	23
Yards rushing	92	200
Yards passing	187	302
Return yards	26	42
Total yards	305	504
Punts-Average	6-47.5	4-37.0
Fumbles-Lost	2-2	2-2
Interceptions	1	1
Penalties-Yards	2-15	5-45
