= 1984 Liberty Bowl =

- 26th Liberty Bowl
Auburn Tigers	Arkansas Razorbacks
(8–4)	(7–3–1)
SEC	SWC
21	15
Head coach: Pat Dye	Head coach: Ken Hatfield
AP / Coaches; 16 / 19
	1	2	3	4	Total
Auburn	14	0	0	7	21
Arkansas	3	0	0	12	15
- Date: December 27, 1984
- Season: 1984
- Stadium: Liberty Bowl Memorial Stadium
- Location: Memphis, Tennessee
- MVP: RB Bo Jackson (Auburn)
- Referee: Bill McDonald (CIFOA)
- Attendance: 50,180

United States TV coverage
- Network: Katz Sports
- Announcers: Curt Gowdy & Len Dawson

The 1984 Liberty Bowl was a college football postseason bowl game played on December 27, 1984, at Liberty Bowl Memorial Stadium in Memphis, Tennessee. The 26th edition of the Liberty Bowl pitted the Auburn Tigers and the Arkansas Razorbacks.

== Background ==
Auburn, off the heels of an 11–1 season, a Southeastern Conference championship and a win in the Sugar Bowl, were ranked #1 to begin the 1984 season. However, they were beaten by #14 Miami 20–18 in the Kickoff Classic, and a loss to #4 Texas the following game meant that the Tigers dropped all the way to #19 in the polls. However, the team won six straight from that point on, including a victory over #9 Florida State to rise to #11. But a loss to #13 Florida dashed their conference title hopes, and they finished the regular season with a 17–15 loss to Alabama in the Iron Bowl. This was Auburn's third straight bowl game appearance, along with their first Liberty Bowl appearance since 1965.

The Razorbacks were in their first season under head coach Ken Hatfield, who had taken over after Lou Holtz was fired the previous year following a 6–5 season and a fourth place finish in the Southwest Conference. Hatfield's team won seven games while finishing tied for 2nd in the conference with TCU. They went 0-2 against ranked opponents, losing 24-18 to #3 Texas in the middle of the season and losing 31-28 to #11 SMU to close out the regular season. This was the 7th bowl game for Arkansas in eight seasons and first Liberty Bowl appearance since 1971.

This also served as the first meeting of the two teams.

== Game summary ==
Arkansas got on the board first on a 31-yard field goal from Greg Horne to make it 3–0 with 7:27 left in the first quarter. Auburn scored four minutes later on a Bo Jackson touchdown plunge that finished off an 80 yard drive, although the extra point was no good, making it 6–3. Auburn struck again after cornerback Kevin Porter intercepted a pass from Brad Taylor and returned it 35 yards for a touchdown. Auburn went for two and on the ensuing possession, quarterback Pat Washington ran in for the 2 point score to make it 14–3, which proved to be the end of scoring for the rest of the first half. The game heated back up in the fourth quarter, with Arkansas taking advantage of a Brent Fullwood fumble that Arkansas recovered on the Auburn 6, responding with a touchdown from fullback Marshall Foreman from two yards out. The two point conversion was no good, keeping it at 14–9. With 5:38 remaining in the game, Jackson took a pass from his left and ran 39 yards for a touchdown, making the score 21–9. Arkansas responded with 3:10 remaining on a 25 yard touchdown pass from Taylor to James Shibest, but the extra point was no good, making it 21–15. Auburn held on in the final minutes to clinch the victory. Jackson finished with 88 yards on 18 carries, with two touchdowns while also having one reception for 25 yards in an MVP effort. Foreman finished with 62 yards on 15 carries with one touchdown. Bobby Joe Edmonds caught 10 passes for 68 yards.

== Game statistics ==
Statistics	Auburn	Arkansas
First downs	13	20
Rushing yards	168	130
Passing yards	84	226
Passing (C–A–I)	5–15–0	19–40–4
Total offense	252	356
Punts–average	9–37.9	4–38.3
Fumbles–lost	1–1	0–0
Penalties–yards	8–56	8–60
Time of possession	29:42	30:18

== Aftermath ==
Auburn went on to play in four more bowl games in the decade, although they have not returned to the Liberty Bowl since this game. Arkansas went to five more bowl games in the decade, returning to the Liberty Bowl three years later. After Arkansas joined the SEC in 1992, the two teams began meeting regularly with each other. It was not until 1995 that Arkansas managed to beat Auburn.
