= 1984 Arkansas Razorbacks football team =

American college football season

1984 Arkansas Razorbacks football

Liberty Bowl, L 15–21 vs. Auburn
- Conference: Southwest Conference
- Record: 7–4–1 (5–3 SWC)
- Head coach: Ken Hatfield (1st season)
- Offensive scheme: Option
- Defensive coordinator: Fred Goldsmith (1st season)
- Captains: Marcus Elliott; Mark Lee
- Home stadium: Razorback Stadium; War Memorial Stadium

1984 Southwest Conference football standings
	Conf.					Overall
Team	W		L		T	W		L		T
No. 8 SMU +	6	–	2	–	0	10	–	2	–	0
Houston +	6	–	2	–	0	7	–	5	–	0
TCU	5	–	3	–	0	8	–	4	–	0
Arkansas	5	–	3	–	0	7	–	4	–	1
Texas	5	–	3	–	0	7	–	4	–	1
Baylor	4	–	4	–	0	5	–	6	–	0
Texas A&M	3	–	5	–	0	6	–	5	–	0
Texas Tech	2	–	6	–	0	4	–	7	–	0
Rice	0	–	8	–	0	1	–	10	–	0
+ – Conference co-champions; Rankings from AP Poll

The 1984 Arkansas Razorbacks football team represented the University of Arkansas as a member of the Southwest Conference (SWC) during the 1984 NCAA Division I-A football season. Led by first-year head coach Ken Hatfield, the Razorbacks compiled an overall record of 7–4–1 with a mark of 5–3 in conference play, placing in a three-way tie for third in the SWC. Arkansas was invited to the Liberty Bowl, where the Razorbacks lost to Auburn. The team played home games at Razorback Stadium in Fayetteville, Arkansas and War Memorial Stadium in Little Rock, Arkansas.

Junior punt returner Bobby Edmonds of Arkansas ranked ninth in the nation in punt return average. He averaged 11.8 yards per return. Arkansas had the seventh-best scoring defense in 1984, yielding only 12.5 points per game.

== Schedule ==
Date	Opponent	Site	TV	Result	Attendance	Source
September 15	Ole Miss*	War Memorial Stadium; Little Rock, AR (rivalry)		T 14–14	55,480	
September 22	Tulsa*	Razorback Stadium; Fayetteville, AR		W 18–9	43,680	
September 29	Navy*	War Memorial Stadium; Little Rock, AR	ESPN	W 33–10	54,812	
October 6	TCU	Razorback Stadium; Fayetteville, AR		L 31–32	42,208	
October 13	Texas Tech	War Memorial Stadium; Little Rock, AR (rivalry)		W 24–0	54,986	
October 20	at No. 3 Texas	Texas Memorial Stadium; Austin, TX (rivalry)		L 18–24	77,809	
October 27	at Houston	Houston Astrodome; Houston, TX		W 17–3	28,347	
November 3	Rice	War Memorial Stadium; Little Rock, AR		W 28–6	54,290	
November 10	at Baylor	Baylor Stadium; Waco, TX		W 14–9	43,500	
November 17	Texas A&M	Razorback Stadium; Fayetteville, AR (rivalry)	Raycom	W 28–0	38,020	
November 24	at No. 11 SMU	Texas Stadium; Irving, TX	ESPN	L 28–31	38,712	
December 27	vs. No. 16 Auburn*	Liberty Bowl Memorial Stadium; Memphis, TN (Liberty Bowl)	Katz	L 15–21	50,180	
*Non-conference game; Rankings from AP Poll released prior to the game

== Game summaries ==
=== Liberty Bowl ===
The Razorbacks met Auburn in the Liberty Bowl. The MVP of the game was Bo Jackson of Auburn, who had 88 yards on 18 carries with 2 touchdowns. Arkansas quarterback Brad Taylor completed 18 of 34, for 201 yards passing, with one touchdown and two interceptions. The Auburn defense held the Hogs' leading rusher Marshall Foreman to 62 yards on 15 carries. Arkansas lost the game 21–15, despite outgaining the Tigers in total yards, 356 to 252.

== Roster ==
- QB Brad Taylor
- Captain- Mark Lee
