= 1984 Houston Cougars football team =

American college football season

1984 Houston Cougars football

SWC co-champion

Cotton Bowl Classic, L 28–45 vs. Boston College
- Conference: Southwest Conference
- Record: 7–5 (6–2 SWC)
- Head coach: Bill Yeoman (23rd season)
- Offensive scheme: Houston Veer
- Defensive coordinator: Don Todd (13th season)
- Captains: Audray McMillian; Ray Rogers; Bryant Winn
- Home stadium: Houston Astrodome

1984 Southwest Conference football standings
	Conf.					Overall
Team	W		L		T	W		L		T
No. 8 SMU +	6	–	2	–	0	10	–	2	–	0
Houston +	6	–	2	–	0	7	–	5	–	0
TCU	5	–	3	–	0	8	–	4	–	0
Arkansas	5	–	3	–	0	7	–	4	–	1
Texas	5	–	3	–	0	7	–	4	–	1
Baylor	4	–	4	–	0	5	–	6	–	0
Texas A&M	3	–	5	–	0	6	–	5	–	0
Texas Tech	2	–	6	–	0	4	–	7	–	0
Rice	0	–	8	–	0	1	–	10	–	0
+ – Conference co-champions; Rankings from AP Poll

The 1984 Houston Cougars football team, also known as the Houston Cougars, Houston, or UH, represented the University of Houston during the 1984 NCAA Division I-A football season. The Cougars were led by 23rd-year head coach Bill Yeoman and played their home games at the Astrodome in Houston, Texas. The team competed as members of the Southwest Conference, finishing as co-champions with SMU with a conference record of 6–2. Houston was invited to the 1985 Cotton Bowl Classic, where they lost to Boston College.

== Schedule ==
Date	Opponent	Site	TV	Result	Attendance	Source
September 15	Miami (OH)*	Houston Astrodome; Houston, TX		W 30–17	28,750	
September 22	at No. 9 Washington*	Husky Stadium; Seattle, WA		L 7–35	59,534	
September 29	Louisville*	Houston Astrodome; Houston, TX		L 28–30	22,533	
October 6	at Baylor	Baylor Stadium; Waco, TX (rivalry)		W 27–17	34,500	
October 13	Texas A&M	Houston Astrodome; Houston, TX		W 9–7	34,103	
October 20	at No. 6 SMU	Texas Stadium; Irving, TX (rivalry)		W 29–20	28,361	
October 27	Arkansas^{†}	Houston Astrodome; Houston, TX		L 3–17	28,347	
November 3	No. 20 TCU	Houston Astrodome; Houston, TX	Raycom	L 14–21	20,102	
November 10	at No. 3 Texas	Texas Memorial Stadium; Austin, TX	Raycom	W 29–15	80,348	
November 24	at Texas Tech	Jones Stadium; Lubbock, TX (rivalry)		W 24–17	27,373	
December 1	Rice	Houston Astrodome; Houston, TX (rivalry)		W 38–26	30,123	
January 1	vs. No. 8 Boston College*	Cotton Bowl; Dallas, TX (Cotton Bowl Classic)	CBS	L 28–45	67,381	
*Non-conference game; ^{†}Homecoming; Rankings from AP Poll released prior to the game

== Game summaries ==
=== Vs. Boston College (Cotton Bowl) ===
	1	2	3	4	Total
No. 8 Eagles	17	14	0	14	45
Cougars	7	7	14	0	28

== Roster ==
1984 Houston Cougars football team roster
Players
Coaches
Offense

Pos.	#	Name	Class
OT	78	Gary Heitmann	Jr
TE	84	Carl Hilton	Jr
OT	63	Darrell Jackson	Jr
WR	80	Anthony Ketchum	Jr
QB	3	Gerald Landry	So
WR	14	Dwayne LeBlanc	Fr
G	75	Ray Rogers	Sr
C	55	Todd Schoppe	Jr
WR	29	Larry Shepherd	Jr
RB	33	Raymond Tate	So
G	74	Michael Wharton	Sr

Defense

Pos.	#	Name	Class
DE	49	Kevin Alexander	Jr
DT	19	Simon Fletcher	Sr
DL	94	Eddie Gilmore	Jr
LB	50	Robert Harper	Fr
DE	27	James Holmes	Sr
FS	10	Audray McMillian	Sr
CB	21	Greg Purcell	Jr
DT	95	T. J. Turner	Jr
LB	54	Bryant Winn	Sr

Special teams

Pos.	#	Name	Class
K	2	Mike Clendenen	Sr

Head coach

- Bill Yeoman

Coordinators/assistant coaches

Legend

- (C) Team captain
- (S) Suspended
- (I) Ineligible
- Injured
- Redshirt
