= 1984 Freedom Bowl =

- Inaugural Freedom Bowl Game
Texas Longhorns	Iowa Hawkeyes
(7–3–1)	(7–4–1)
17	55
Head coach: Fred Akers	Head coach: Hayden Fry
AP / Coaches; 19 / 20
	1	2	3	4	Total
Texas	0	17	0	0	17
Iowa	14	10	31	0	55
- Date: December 26, 1984
- Season: 1984
- Stadium: Anaheim Stadium
- Location: Anaheim, CA
- MVP: Chuck Long (Iowa QB); William Harris (Texas TE)
- Referee: Jack Gatto (PCAA); Mike Pereira (Line Judge)
- Attendance: 24,093

United States TV coverage
- Network: TCS/Metrosports
- Announcers: Sam Nover and Jack Snow

The 1984 Freedom Bowl was an American college football bowl game played on December 26, 1984, at Anaheim Stadium in Anaheim, CA. The inaugural edition of the Freedom Bowl matched the #19 Texas Longhorns of the Southwest Conference and the Big Ten's Iowa Hawkeyes. After leading 24–17 at halftime, the Hawkeyes blew the game open with 31 unanswered points in the third quarter to win 55–17.

== Background ==
The Longhorns started the season ranked #4 in the polls, and they beat #11 Auburn and #4 Penn State to rise to #1 in the polls. After a win over Rice, they tied #3 Oklahoma to fall to #3. Wins over Arkansas, #14 SMU, and Texas Tech soon followed. However, they lost to Houston at home, making them fall to #10. A win over #12 TCU was their last of the season, as they fell to Baylor and Texas A&M to close out the year, while finishing tied for second in the Southwest Conference with TCU and Arkansas, while SMU and Houston shared the crown. This was their 8th straight bowl appearance. Iowa began the year ranked #10 in the polls, and they won their opening game versus rival Iowa State to rise to #5. Losses to #12 Penn State and #5 Ohio State made them fall out of the polls. Five straight wins (including a win over #14 Purdue) made them rise back up to #17. They tied with Wisconsin 10-10, but a loss to Michigan State the following week made them fall out of the polls permanently. A loss to Minnesota was followed by a win over Hawaii to close out the regular season. They finished in third place in the Big Ten Conference, behind Ohio State, and tied 2nd placers Illinois & Purdue. This was Iowa's fourth straight bowl appearance.

== Game summary ==
Iowa's Chuck Long threw for 461 yards and a bowl-record six touchdowns.

=== Team statistics ===
Statistics	Texas	Iowa
First downs	15	28
Plays–yards	69-300	81-560
Rushes–yards	15-115	41-91
Passing yards	185	469
Passing: comp–att–int	17-34-2	30-40-0
Time of possession		

=== Individual leaders ===
Team	Category	Player	Statistics
Texas	Passing	Todd Dodge	16-32, 180 yds, 2 TD, 2 INT
Texas	Rushing	Orr; Johnson	12 carries, 67 yds; 8 carries, 56 yds
Texas	Receiving	Bryant; Duhon	3 catches, 50 yds, 1 TD; 1 catch, 47 yds
Iowa	Passing	Chuck Long	29-39, 461 yds, 6 TD
Iowa	Rushing	Owen Gill	17 carries, 61 yds
Iowa	Receiving	Robert Smith; Bill Happel	4 catches, 115 yds, 1 TD; 8 catches, 104 yds, 1 TD

== Aftermath ==
The Longhorns made just two more bowl games in the decade, while Iowa made four more in the decade.
