= 1984 TCU Horned Frogs football team =

American college football season

1984 TCU Horned Frogs football

Astro-Bluebonnet Bowl, L 14–31 vs. West Virginia
- Conference: Southwest Conference
- Record: 8–4 (5–3 SWC)
- Head coach: Jim Wacker (2nd season)
- Defensive coordinator: Tom Mueller (2nd season)
- Home stadium: Amon G. Carter Stadium

1984 Southwest Conference football standings
	Conf.					Overall
Team	W		L		T	W		L		T
No. 8 SMU +	6	–	2	–	0	10	–	2	–	0
Houston +	6	–	2	–	0	7	–	5	–	0
TCU	5	–	3	–	0	8	–	4	–	0
Arkansas	5	–	3	–	0	7	–	4	–	1
Texas	5	–	3	–	0	7	–	4	–	1
Baylor	4	–	4	–	0	5	–	6	–	0
Texas A&M	3	–	5	–	0	6	–	5	–	0
Texas Tech	2	–	6	–	0	4	–	7	–	0
Rice	0	–	8	–	0	1	–	10	–	0
+ – Conference co-champions; Rankings from AP Poll

The 1984 TCU Horned Frogs football team represented Texas Christian University (TCU) in the 1984 NCAA Division I-A football season. The Horned Frogs finished the season 8–4 overall and 5–3 in the Southwest Conference for their first winning season since 1971. The team was coached by Jim Wacker, in his second year as head coach. The Frogs played their home games in Amon G. Carter Stadium, which is located on campus in Fort Worth, Texas. They were invited to the Astro-Bluebonnet Bowl where they lost to West Virginia by a score of 14–31.

== Schedule ==
Date	Opponent	Rank	Site	TV	Result	Attendance	Source
September 15	at Utah State*		Romney Stadium; Logan, UT		W 62–18	12,009	
September 22	Kansas State*		Amon G. Carter Stadium; Fort Worth, TX		W 42–10	28,412	
September 29	at No. 11 SMU		Texas Stadium; Irving, TX (rivalry)		L 17–26	58,206	
October 6	at Arkansas		Razorback Stadium; Fayetteville, AR		W 32–31	42,208	
October 13	Rice		Amon G. Carter Stadium; Fort Worth, TX		W 45–24	22,612	
October 20	North Texas State*		Amon G. Carter Stadium; Fort Worth, TX		W 34–3	18,795	
October 27	Baylor		Amon G. Carter Stadium; Fort Worth, TX (rivalry)		W 38–28	23,885	
November 3	at Houston	No. 20	Houston Astrodome; Houston, TX	Raycom	W 21–14	20,102	
November 10	Texas Tech	No. 15	Amon G. Carter Stadium; Fort Worth, TX (rivalry)		W 27–16	34,075	
November 17	No. 10 Texas	No. 12	Amon G. Carter Stadium; Fort Worth, TX (rivalry)	ABC	L 23–44	47,280	
November 24	at Texas A&M	No. 17	Kyle Field; College Station, TX (rivalry)		L 21–35	38,209	
December 31	vs. West Virginia*		Houston Astrodome; Houston, TX (Bluebonnet Bowl)		L 14–31	43,260	
*Non-conference game; Rankings from AP Poll released prior to the game
