= 1984 Texas Longhorns football team =

American college football season

1984 Texas Longhorns football

Freedom Bowl, L 17–55 vs. Iowa
- Conference: Southwest Conference
- Record: 7–4–1 (5–3 SWC)
- Head coach: Fred Akers (8th season)
- Offensive coordinator: Ron Toman (4th season)
- Defensive coordinator: David McWilliams (3rd season)
- Home stadium: Texas Memorial Stadium

1984 Southwest Conference football standings
	Conf.					Overall
Team	W		L		T	W		L		T
No. 8 SMU +	6	–	2	–	0	10	–	2	–	0
Houston +	6	–	2	–	0	7	–	5	–	0
TCU	5	–	3	–	0	8	–	4	–	0
Arkansas	5	–	3	–	0	7	–	4	–	1
Texas	5	–	3	–	0	7	–	4	–	1
Baylor	4	–	4	–	0	5	–	6	–	0
Texas A&M	3	–	5	–	0	6	–	5	–	0
Texas Tech	2	–	6	–	0	4	–	7	–	0
Rice	0	–	8	–	0	1	–	10	–	0
+ – Conference co-champions; Rankings from AP Poll

The 1984 Texas Longhorns football team represented the University of Texas at Austin in the 1984 NCAA Division I-A football season. The Longhorns finished the regular season with a 7–3–1 record and lost to Iowa in the Freedom Bowl.

== Schedule ==
Date	Time	Opponent	Rank	Site	TV	Result	Attendance	Source
September 15	6:45 p.m.	No. 11 Auburn*	No. 4	Texas Memorial Stadium; Austin, TX	ESPN	W 35–27	78,348	
September 29	11:00 a.m.	vs. No. 4 Penn State*	No. 2	Giants Stadium; East Rutherford, NJ	Raycom	W 28–3	76,883	
October 6	7:00 p.m.	at Rice	No. 1	Rice Stadium; Houston, TX (rivalry)	HSE	W 38–13	56,047	
October 13	3:00 p.m.	vs. No. 3 Oklahoma*	No. 1	Cotton Bowl; Dallas, TX (Red River Shootout)	ABC	T 15–15	75,587	
October 20	1:00 p.m.	Arkansas	No. 3	Texas Memorial Stadium; Austin, TX (rivalry)		W 24–18	77,809	
October 27	2:30 p.m.	No. 14 SMU	No. 3	Texas Memorial Stadium; Austin, TX	ABC	W 13–7	80,759	
November 3	2:00 p.m.	at Texas Tech	No. 2	Jones Stadium; Lubbock, TX (rivalry)		W 13–10	50,722	
November 10	11:30 a.m.	Houston	No. 3	Texas Memorial Stadium; Austin, TX	Raycom	L 15–29	80,348	
November 17	2:30 p.m.	at No. 12 TCU	No. 10	Amon G. Carter Stadium; Fort Worth, TX (rivalry)	ABC	W 44–23	47,280	
November 24	11:30 a.m.	at Baylor	No. 6	Baylor Stadium; Waco, TX (rivalry)	Raycom	L 10–24	33,500	
December 1	6:45 p.m.	Texas A&M	No. 13	Texas Memorial Stadium; Austin, TX (rivalry)	ESPN	L 12–37	81,309	
December 26	7:15 p.m.	vs. Iowa*	No. 19	Anaheim Stadium; Anaheim, CA (Freedom Bowl)	Raycom	L 17–55	24,093	
*Non-conference game; Rankings from AP Poll released prior to the game; All times are in Central time

== Game summaries ==
=== Auburn ===
#11 Auburn at #4 Texas

Team	1	2	3	4	Total
Auburn	0	13	6	8	27
• Texas	14	0	7	14	35

- Date: September 15
- Location: Texas Memorial Stadium, Austin, Texas
- Game start: 6:47 pm CDT
- Elapsed time: 3:11
- Game attendance: 78,348
- Game weather: 79 °F (26 °C), high clouds, Wind NE 20–25 mph (32–40 km/h)
- Source: Box score

Scoring summary
1	5:15	TEX	Dodge 10-yard run (Ward kick)	TEX 7-0
1	0:50	TEX	Orr 1-yard run (Ward kick)	TEX 14-0
2	11:05	AUB	Collins 2-yard run (McGinty kick)	TEX 14-7
2	3:33	AUB	McGinty 22-yard field goal	TEX 14-10
2	0:00	AUB	McGinty 40-yard field goal	TEX 14-13
3	9:19	TEX	Duhon 32-yard pass from Dodge (Ward kick)	TEX 21-13
3	4:23	AUB	Bo Jackson 5-yard run (run failed)	TEX 21-19
4	9:19	TEX	Jerome Johnson 10-yard run (Ward kick)	TEX 28-19
4	4:50	TEX	Jerome Johnson 14-yard run (Ward kick)	TEX 35-19
4	2:33	AUB	Fullwood 1-yard run (Washington run)	TEX 35-27

=== Vs. Oklahoma ===
#3 Oklahoma vs. #1 Texas

Team	1	2	3	4	Total
Texas	7	3	0	5	15
Oklahoma	0	0	15	0	15

- Date: Saturday, October 13
- Location: Cotton Bowl, Dallas, Texas
- Game attendance: 75,587
- Game weather: Rain
- Source: Gainesville Sun

Scoring summary
1	TEX	Bryant 25 yard pass from Dodge (Ward kick)	TEX 7-0
2	TEX	Ward 40 yard field goal	TEX 10-0
3	OKLA	Sewell 5 yard run (Lashar kick)	TEX 10-7
3	OKLA	Safety, Steelhammer centered ball out of end zone	TEX 10-9
3	OKLA	Sewell 11 yard run (pass failed)	OKLA 15-10
4	TEX	Safety, intentional snap out of end zone	OKLA 15-12
4	TEX	Ward 32 yard field goal	Tied 15-15

=== Vs. Iowa (Freedom Bowl) ===
#19 Texas vs. Iowa

Team	1	2	3	4	Total
#19 Longhorns	0	17	0	0	17
• Hawkeyes	14	10	31	0	55

- Date: December 26
- Location: Anaheim Stadium, Anaheim, California
- Game start: 5:26 pm PST
- Elapsed time: 3:13
- Game attendance: 24,093
- Game weather: 55 °F (13 °C), Rain
- Referee: Jack Gatto
- TV announcers (Mizlou): Sam Nover and Jack Snow
- Source: Box Score

Scoring summary
1	9:15	IOWA	Hayes 6-yard pass from Long (Nichol kick)	IOWA 7–0
1	3:27	Iowa	Flagg 11-yard pass from Long (Nichol kick)	IOWA 14–0
2	13:35	Texas	Bryant 11-yard pass from Dodge (Ward kick)	IOWA 14–7
2	10:14	IOWA	Bush 1-yard run (Nichol kick)	IOWA 21–7
2	5:34	Texas	Harris 1-yard pass from Dodge (Ward kick)	IOWA 21–14
2	2:23	Texas	Ward 46-yard FG	IOWA 21–17
2	0:00	IOWA	Nichol 27-yard FG	IOWA 24–17
3	13:03	IOWA	Nichol 35-yard FG	IOWA 27–17
3	12:05	IOWA	Happel 33-yard pass from Long (Nichol kick)	IOWA 34–17
3	7:09	IOWA	Smith 49-yard pass from Long (Nichol kick)	IOWA 41–17
3	4:53	IOWA	Helverson 4-yard pass from Long (Nichol kick)	IOWA 48–17
3	2:19	IOWA	Hayes 15-yard pass from Long (Nichol kick)	IOWA 55–17

== Roster ==
- QB Todd Dodge
