= Steve Strachan (American football) =

American football player (born 1963)

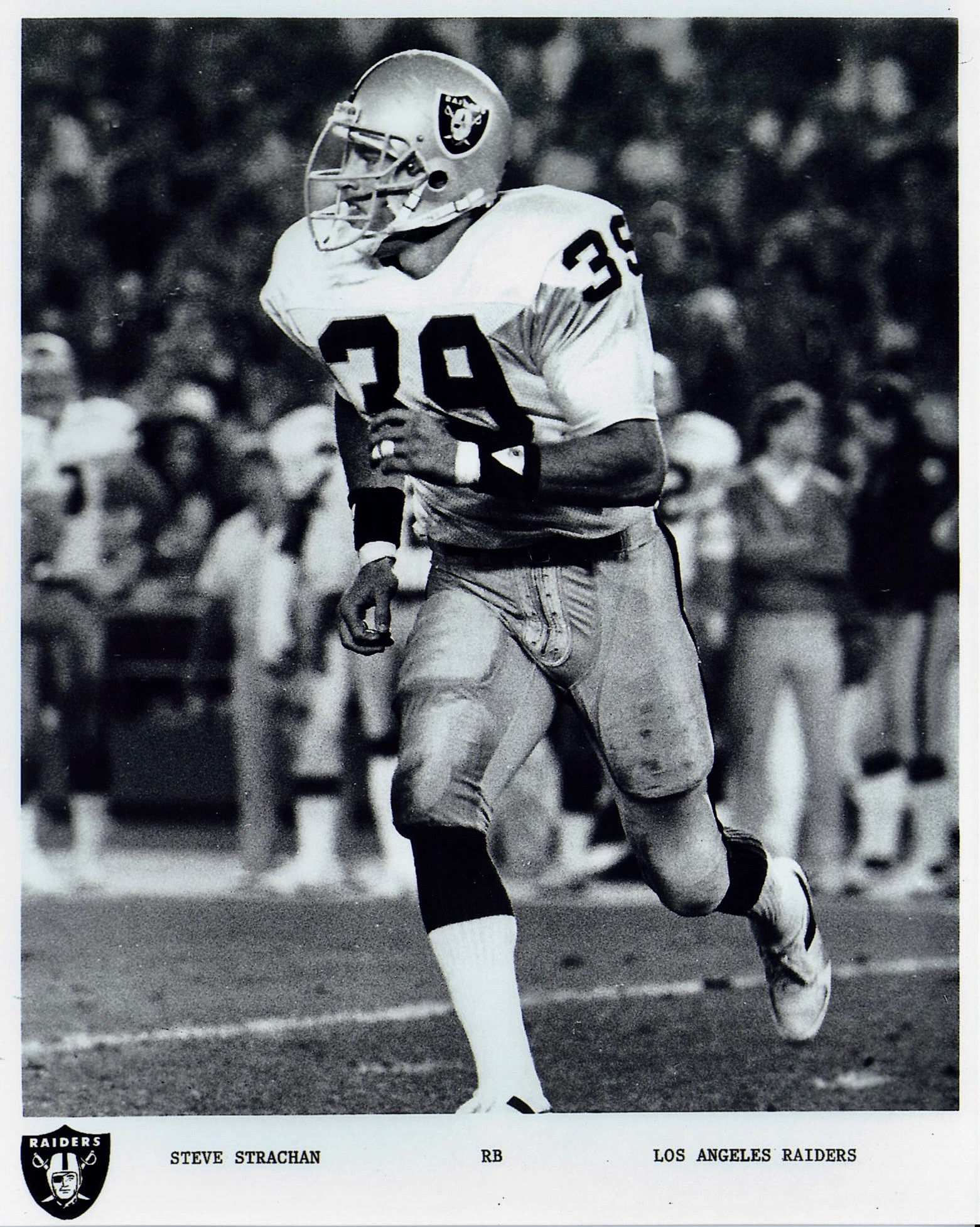

No. 39
- Position: Running back

Personal information
- Born: March 22, 1963 (age 63); Everett, Massachusetts, U.S.
- Listed height: 6 ft 1 in (1.85 m)
- Listed weight: 221 lb (100 kg)

Career information
- High school: Burlington (Burlington, Massachusetts)
- College: Boston College
- NFL draft: 1985: 11th round, 303rd overall pick

Career history
- Los Angeles Raiders (1985–1989); New England Patriots (1991)*
- * Offseason or practice squad member only

Awards and highlights
- Nils V. "Swede" Nelson Award (1984); Scanlan Award (1984); 1985 Cotton Bowl Classic MVP; Boston College Varsity Club Athletic Hall of Fame (1993)

Career NFL statistics
- Rushing yards: 174
- Rushing average: 3.3
- Total touchdowns: 1
- Stats at Pro Football Reference

Stephen Michael Strachan (born March 22, 1963) is an American former professional football player who was a running back in the National Football League (NFL). He was selected in the 11th round of the 1985 NFL draft by and played for the Los Angeles Raiders. He played college football for the Boston College Eagles.

== College career ==
Playing alongside Heisman Trophy winner Doug Flutie, Strachan was the MVP of the 1985 Cotton Bowl Classic. He had 23 carries for 91 yards and two touchdowns.

== Professional career ==
Drafted by the Los Angeles Raiders, Strachan played for the Raiders for five seasons from 1985 to 1989. He recorded his only NFL touchdown in on October 9, 1988, on a 13-yard pass from Jay Schroeder in a 24–14 loss to the Miami Dolphins.

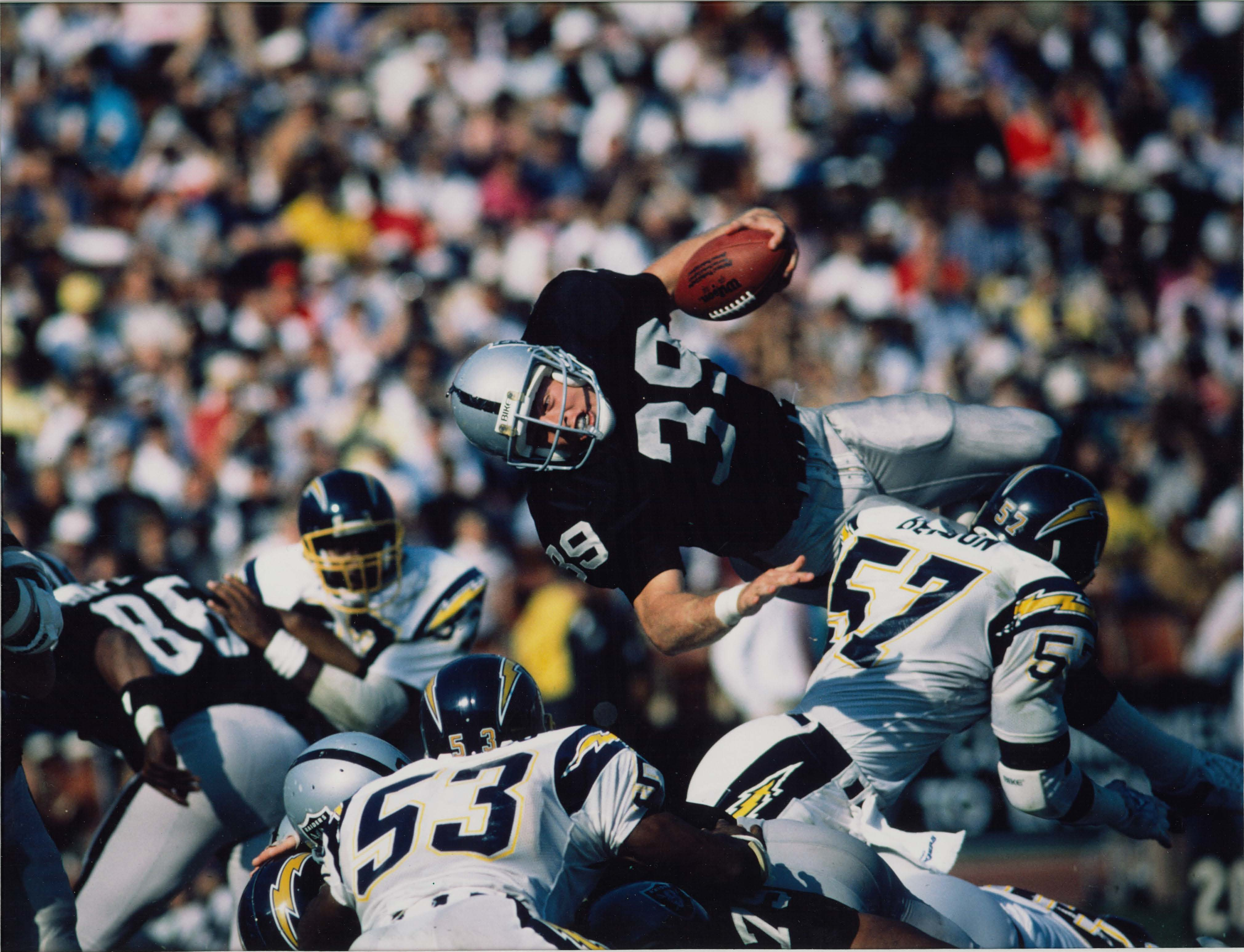
Steve Strachan leaping over defenders in the Raiders 37–31 win over the San Diego Chargers on November 20, 1986.
