= 1985 Rose Bowl =

American college football game

- 71st Rose Bowl Game
USC Trojans	Ohio State Buckeyes
(9-3)	(9–3)
20	17
Head coach: Ted Tollner	Head coach: Earle Bruce
AP / Coaches; 18 / 14	AP / Coaches; 6 / 5
	1	2	3	4	Total
USC	10	7	3	0	20
Ohio State	3	3	3	8	17
- Date: January 1, 1985
- Season: 1984
- Stadium: Rose Bowl
- Location: Pasadena, California
- MVP: Tim Green (QB, USC); Jack Del Rio (LB, USC)
- Favorite: Ohio State by 3½ points
- National anthem: Ohio State University Marching Band
- Referee: James Sprenger (Pac-10); split crew: Pac-10, Big Ten)
- Halftime show: Ohio State University Marching Band, Spirit of Troy
- Attendance: 102,594

United States TV coverage
- Network: NBC
- Announcers: Dick Enberg, Merlin Olsen

The 1985 Rose Bowl Game was a postseason college football bowl game between the USC Trojans of the Pacific-10 Conference and Ohio State Buckeyes of the Big Ten Conference, held on New Year’s Day in the Rose Bowl in Pasadena, California. The game resulted in a 20–17 victory for the underdog Trojans.

== Scoring summary ==
First quarter

- Ohio State – Spangler 21-yard field goal, 12:08 – OSU 3, USC 0
- USC – Jordan 51-yard field goal, 6:52 – OSU 3, USC 3
- USC – Cormier 3-yard pass from Green (Jordan kick) 1:54 – USC 10, OSU 3

Second quarter

- USC – Ware 19-yard pass from Green (Jordan kick) – USC 17, OSU 3
- Ohio State – Spangler 46-yard field goal, 0:00 – USC 17, OSU 6

Third quarter

- Ohio State – Spangler 52-yard field goal, 6:37 – USC 17, OSU 9
- USC – Jordan 51-yard field goal, 4:05 – USC 20, OSU 9

Fourth quarter

- Ohio State – Carter 18-yard pass from Tomczak (Tomczak run), 7:34 – USC 20, OSU 17

Tim Green and Jack Del Rio earned the Rose Bowl MVP awards.

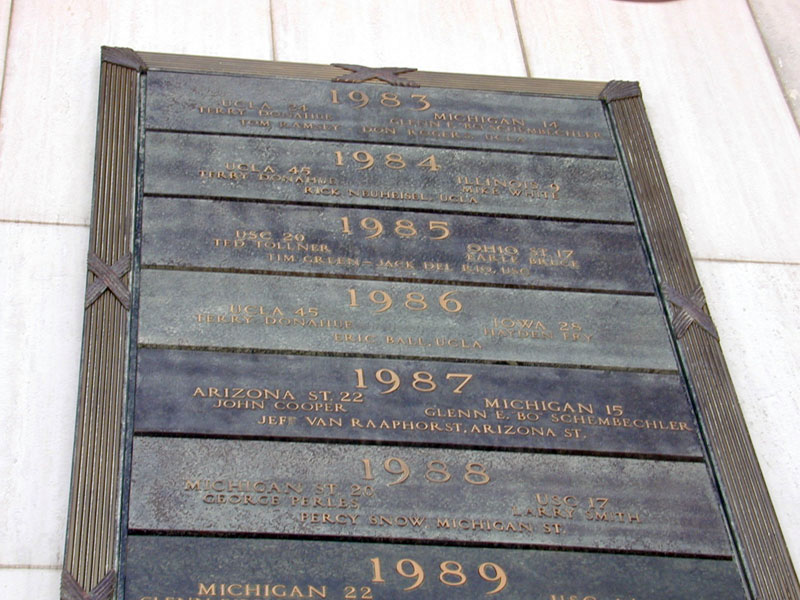
Rose Bowl records at the Hall of Champions

== Highlights ==
- With fourth straight win, Pac-10 takes its first lead in the series with the Big Ten, 20–19
  - Pac-10 has won ten of eleven, and fourteen of the last sixteen meetings
- Using a swarming defense, USC caused three Mike Tomczak interceptions
- Tomczak threw 37 passes in the game
- Ohio State kicker Rich Spangler scored a Rose Bowl-record 52-yard field goal
- USC kicker Steve Jordan had two 51-yard field goals
- Big contribution from Trojans' Tim Green and Timmie Ware, Joe Cormier, Fred Crutcher, and Kennedy Pola
- Only Rose Bowl appearance for Sophomore QB Johnny Utah

== Statistics ==
Statistics	USC	Ohio State
First downs	16	19
Rushes–yards	42–133	34–113
Passing yards	128	290
Passes	13–25–0	24–37–3
Total yards	261	403
Punts–average	7–42	4–48
Fumbles–lost	2–1	4–1
Turnovers by	1	4
Penalties–yards	4–38	4–46
Time of possession	31:11	28:47
