= Audray McMillian =

American football player (born 1962)

No. 26
- Position: Cornerback

Personal information
- Born: August 13, 1962 (age 64); Carthage, Texas, U.S.
- Listed height: 5 ft 11 in (1.80 m)
- Listed weight: 190 lb (86 kg)

Career information
- High school: Carthage
- College: Houston
- NFL draft: 1985: 3rd round, 84th overall pick

Career history
- New England Patriots (1985)*; Houston Oilers (1985–1988); Minnesota Vikings (1989–1993)
- * Offseason or practice squad member only

Awards and highlights
- First-team All-Pro (1992); Pro Bowl (1992); NFL interceptions co-leader (1992); First-team All-SWC (1984)

Career NFL statistics
- Interceptions: 19
- Fumble recoveries: 4
- Touchdowns: 3
- Stats at Pro Football Reference

Audray Glenn McMillian (born August 13, 1962), is an American former professional football player who was a cornerback for eight seasons in the National Football League (NFL) from 1985 to 1993 for the Houston Oilers and Minnesota Vikings. McMillian played college football for the Houston Cougars and was selected by the New England Patriots in the third round of the 1985 NFL draft. He was a Pro Bowl selection in 1992 after leading the NFL, along with Henry Jones of the Buffalo Bills, with eight interceptions.
