= 1984 NCAA Division I-A football season =

American college football season

1984 NCAA Division I-A season
- Number of teams: 105
- Preseason AP No. 1: Auburn

Postseason
- Duration: December 15, 1984 – January 1, 1985
- Bowl games: 18
- Heisman Trophy: Boston College quarterback Doug Flutie
- Champion(s): BYU (AP, Coaches, FWAA, NFF)

Division I-A football seasons
- ← 1983 1985 →

The 1984 NCAA Division I-A football season was topsy-turvy from start to finish. It ended with the BYU Cougars being bestowed their first and only national championship by beating Michigan in the Holiday Bowl. In the final AP Poll, BYU received 1,160 points (with 38 first-place votes) while Washington received 1,140 points (with 16 first-place votes) for one of the closest finishes in AP history. NCAA-sanctioned voters (Berryman QPRS, The Football News and the National Championship Foundation) did name Washington their champion, but the school does not formally claim the season as a championship season.

While the Cougars finished with a perfect 13–0 record and were the consensus National Champions, most noted the contentious circumstance of awarding it to the program (none of their conference opponents in the WAC finished with fewer than four losses, and even Michigan finished the season at 6–6 after the bowl loss) and argue that the championship could have just as well have gone to the 11–1 Washington Huskies. Washington (ranked fourth in the AP polls) had stated a preference for the more prestigious 1985 Orange Bowl, and accepted its invitation over that of the Holiday Bowl. One poll put out among anonymous AP voters by NBC asked who they might rank as #1 depending on the outcomes of the Orange and Holiday Bowls, with over half stating that a decisive victory by Oklahoma might make them the national champion; when asked if Washington won decisively, more of the pollsters believed BYU would be deemed champion.

37 subsequent national champions have come from what are now known as the power conferences plus independent Notre Dame until 2017 UCF.

== Rule changes ==
- Defensive pass interference will be penalized 15 yards from the previous spot if the foul occurs more than 15 yards downfield. If the foul occurred 15 yards or less downfield, the penalty will be enforced at the spot of the foul.
- Kickoffs that go through the back of the end zone or out of bounds in the end zone in the air untouched will be brought out to the 30-yard line instead of the 20.
- Clipping is limited to an area 6-10 yards from the line of scrimmage.
- Wide receivers are only permitted to block below the waist once the ball passes the line of scrimmage.
- Eliminating the PAT if the game has been decided, and if both teams agree.
- Offensive face-masking is now a foul, penalized 15 yards.

== Conference and program changes ==
- New Mexico State University joined the Pacific Coast Athletic Association from the Missouri Valley Conference.

School	1983 Conference	1984 Conference
New Mexico State Aggies	MVC	PCAA

== August–September ==
The preseason AP Poll was led by No. 1 Auburn, No. 2 Nebraska, No. 3 Pittsburgh, No. 4 Clemson, and No. 5 UCLA.

August 27-September 1: No. 1 Auburn faced off against the defending champion, No. 10 Miami, in the second annual Kickoff Classic. In an early warning of a topsy-turvy year, the Tigers fell 20–18 with Bo Jackson gaining just 96 rushing yards. Five days later, Miami also beat No. 17 Florida 32–20. No. 3 Pittsburgh lost 20–14 to Brigham Young; the Panthers soon dropped out of the polls and finished with a disappointing 3–7–1 record. No. 4 Clemson defeated Appalachian State 40–7. No. 2 Nebraska, No. 5 UCLA, and No. 6 Texas had not begun their seasons, and the next AP Poll featured No. 1 Miami, No. 2 Nebraska, No. 3 Clemson, No. 4 UCLA, and No. 5 Texas.

September 8: No. 1 Miami played their third consecutive ranked opponent, and this time they lost 22–14 to No. 14 Michigan. No. 2 Nebraska began their season with a 42–7 win over Wyoming. No. 3 Clemson shut out Virginia 55–0. No. 4 UCLA struggled to beat San Diego State, and their 18–15 victory dropped them out of the top five in the next poll. No. 5 Texas still had not started their schedule. No. 10 Iowa beat Iowa State 59–21, impressing the voters enough to make a big jump in the next poll: No. 1 Nebraska, No. 2 Clemson, No. 3 Michigan, and No. 4 Texas, with Iowa and Miami tied at No. 5.

September 15: No. 1 Nebraska beat Minnesota 38–7, and No. 2 Clemson was idle. No. 3 Michigan lost 20–11 to No. 16 Washington. No. 4 Texas opened play with a 35–27 victory over No. 11 Auburn, and No. 5 Miami bounced back with a 28–17 win at Purdue. Fellow No. 5 Iowa was less successful, losing 20–17 to No. 12 Penn State. The Hawkeyes’ conference rival, No. 9 Ohio State, shut out Washington State 44–0 and moved up in the next poll: No. 1 Nebraska, No. 2 Clemson, No. 3 Texas, No. 4 Miami, and No. 5 Ohio State.

September 22: No. 1 Nebraska blasted No. 8 UCLA 42–3; they had outscored their first three opponents 122–17. No. 2 Clemson lost 26–23 to No. 20 Georgia on a 60-yard field goal with 11 seconds left. No. 3 Texas was idle. No. 4 Miami took its second loss, a 38–3 blowout by No. 15 Florida State. No. 5 Ohio State defeated No. 14 Iowa 45–26. No. 7 Penn State, which had beaten Iowa the previous week, won 56–18 over William & Mary. No. 10 Boston College hosted North Carolina and won 52–20. The next poll featured No. 1 Nebraska, No. 2 Texas, No. 3 Ohio State, No. 4 Penn State, and No. 5 Boston College.

September 29: No. 1 Nebraska lost 17–9 at Syracuse. No. 2 Texas squared off against No. 4 Penn State and won 28–3. No. 3 Ohio State won 35–22 at Minnesota. No. 5 Boston College was idle. No. 6 Washington dominated Miami-Ohio 53–7, and No. 7 Oklahoma beat Kansas State 24–6. The next poll featured No. 1 Texas, No. 2 Ohio State, No. 3 Washington, No. 4 Boston College, and No. 5 Oklahoma.

== October ==
October 6: No. 1 Texas won 38–13 at Rice, but No. 2 Ohio State was upset 28–23 by Purdue. No. 3 Washington defeated Oregon State 19–7. No. 4 Boston College was again idle, as was No. 5 Oklahoma. No. 7 Brigham Young won 59–9 at Colorado State and moved up in the next poll: No. 1 Texas, No. 2 Washington, No. 3 Oklahoma, No. 4 Boston College, and No. 5 Brigham Young.

October 13: The Red River Shootout between No. 1 Texas and No. 3 Oklahoma ended in a controversial 15–15 tie after the officials nullified an Oklahoma interception in the end zone, allowing the Longhorns to kick a game-tying field goal as time expired. No. 2 Washington moved up with a 37–15 win at Stanford. No. 4 Boston College returned to the field with a 24–10 defeat of Temple. No. 5 Brigham Young struggled to beat Wyoming, edging the Cowboys 41–38, and No. 6 Nebraska's 33–23 win over Missouri moved them up in the next poll: No. 1 Washington, No. 2 Oklahoma, No. 3 Texas, No. 4 Boston College, and No. 5 Nebraska.

October 20: For the first time all year, the No. 1 and No. 2 teams both won a game on the same weekend. No. 1 Washington defeated Oregon 17–10, and No. 2 Oklahoma made a late comeback to beat Iowa State 12–10. No. 3 Texas won 24–18 over Arkansas, but No. 4 Boston College fell 21–20 to No. 20 West Virginia. No. 5 Nebraska beat Colorado 24–7, and No. 7 Brigham Young defeated Air Force 30–25, moving up in the next poll: No. 1 Washington, No. 2 Oklahoma, No. 3 Texas, No. 4 Nebraska, and No. 5 Brigham Young.

October 25–27: No. 1 Washington hosted Arizona and won 28–12, but No. 2 Oklahoma lost 28–11 at Kansas. No. 3 Texas won 13–7 over No. 14 SMU, No. 4 Nebraska blasted Kansas State 62–14, No. 5 Brigham Young blanked New Mexico 48–0, and No. 9 South Carolina beat East Carolina 42–20. The next poll featured No. 1 Washington, No. 2 Texas, No. 3 Nebraska, No. 4 Brigham Young, and No. 5 South Carolina.

== November–December ==
November 3: No. 1 Washington defeated California 44–14. No. 2 Texas squeaked past Texas Tech 13–10 while No. 3 Nebraska shut out Iowa State 44–0, leading the two teams to switch places in the next poll. No. 4 Brigham Young beat UTEP 42–9, and No. 5 South Carolina won 35–28 over North Carolina State. The next poll featured No. 1 Washington, No. 2 Nebraska, No. 3 Texas, No. 4 Brigham Young, and No. 5 South Carolina.

November 10: No. 1 Washington went from first in the nation to second in their conference, losing 16–7 at No. 14 USC. Since the Trojans had the head-to-head advantage and were one game ahead in the Pac-10 standings with just one more to play, this ensured a Rose Bowl berth for them. No. 2 Nebraska beat Kansas 41–7, but No. 3 Texas lost 29–15 to Houston. After a 6–0–1 start, the Longhorns would go on to lose four of their last five games. Now the only remaining undefeated teams were two decidedly untraditional powers: No. 4 Brigham Young, which defeated San Diego State 34–3, and No. 5 South Carolina, which won 38–26 over No. 11 Florida State. No. 7 Oklahoma State, whose only loss was to Nebraska, beat Missouri 31–13. No. 10 Florida, which had started the season under a cloud as coach Charley Pell was forced to resign due to recruiting violations, had caught fire under interim coach Galen Hall and shut out No. 8 Georgia 27–0 for their seventh straight victory. The next poll featured Nebraska back at No. 1, followed by No. 2 South Carolina, No. 3 Brigham Young, No. 4 Oklahoma State, and No. 5 Florida.

November 17: No. 1 Nebraska finished their season with a disappointing 17–7 loss to No. 6 Oklahoma. No. 2 South Carolina also lost, falling 38–21 to Navy. This opened the door for No. 3 Brigham Young, which moved to the top spot with a 24–14 victory at Utah. No. 4 Oklahoma State defeated Iowa State 16–10, and No. 5 Florida won 25–17 at Kentucky to clinch the SEC title. However, due to the Gators’ recruiting violations, the Sugar Bowl berth would go to the second-place team, No. 9 LSU. No. 8 Washington closed their schedule with a 38–29 win at Washington State. The next poll featured No. 1 Brigham Young, No. 2 Oklahoma, No. 3 Oklahoma State, No. 4 Florida, and No. 5 Washington.

November 23–24: No. 1 Brigham Young finished the year undefeated with a 38–13 win over Utah State. No. 2 Oklahoma and No. 3 Oklahoma State faced off for the Big 8 title, with the Sooners pulling out a 24–14 victory and an Orange Bowl berth. No. 4 Florida was idle, and No. 5 Washington and No. 7 Nebraska had finished their seasons. The famous “Hail Flutie” game also took place this weekend, with No. 10 Boston College defeating No. 12 Miami on a last-second 48-yard touchdown pass by Doug Flutie. The next poll featured No. 1 Brigham Young, No. 2 Oklahoma, No. 3 Florida, No. 4 Washington, and No. 5 Nebraska.

December 1: The only highly ranked team which had not finished its schedule was No. 3 Florida, which closed with a 27–17 win at No. 12 Florida State. The rankings in the final poll remained the same.

As the champions of the WAC, No. 1 Brigham Young was tied in to the Holiday Bowl, where they would face an underwhelming opponent in unranked Michigan. The highest-ranked bowl matchup was the Orange Bowl between No. 2 Oklahoma and No. 4 Washington. The Sugar Bowl would feature No. 5 Nebraska against No. 11 LSU, the Rose Bowl would pit No. 6 Ohio State, the Big Ten champion, against No. 18 USC, and the Cotton Bowl matched No. 8 Boston College against SWC winner Houston.

== Conference standings ==
1984 Atlantic Coast Conference football standings
	Conf.					Overall
Team	W		L		T	W		L		T
No. 12 Maryland $	5	–	0	–	0	9	–	3	–	0
No. 20 Virginia	3	–	1	–	2	8	–	2	–	2
North Carolina	3	–	2	–	1	5	–	5	–	1
Wake Forest	3	–	3	–	0	6	–	5	–	0
Georgia Tech	2	–	2	–	1	6	–	4	–	1
NC State	1	–	5	–	0	3	–	8	–	0
Duke	1	–	5	–	0	2	–	9	–	0
Clemson	0	–	0	–	0*	7	–	4	–	0
$ – Conference champion; * – Clemson was under NCAA and ACC probation and was ineligible for the ACC title. As a result, their ACC games did not count in the league standings.; Rankings from AP Poll

1984 Big Eight Conference football standings
	Conf.					Overall
Team	W		L		T	W		L		T
No. 4 Nebraska +	6	–	1	–	0	10	–	2	–	0
No. 6 Oklahoma +	6	–	1	–	0	9	–	2	–	1
No. 7 Oklahoma State	5	–	2	–	0	10	–	2	–	0
Kansas	4	–	3	–	0	5	–	6	–	0
Missouri	2	–	4	–	1	3	–	7	–	1
Kansas State	2	–	4	–	1	3	–	7	–	1
Colorado	1	–	6	–	0	1	–	10	–	0
Iowa State	0	–	5	–	2	2	–	7	–	2
+ – Conference co-champions; Rankings from AP Poll

1984 Big Ten Conference football standings
	Conf.					Overall
Team	W		L		T	W		L		T
No. 13 Ohio State $	7	–	2	–	0	9	–	3	–	0
Illinois	6	–	3	–	0	7	–	4	–	0
Purdue	6	–	3	–	0	7	–	5	–	0
No. 16 Iowa	5	–	3	–	1	8	–	4	–	1
Wisconsin	5	–	3	–	1	7	–	4	–	1
Michigan State	5	–	4	–	0	6	–	6	–	0
Michigan	5	–	4	–	0	6	–	6	–	0
Minnesota	3	–	6	–	0	4	–	7	–	0
Northwestern	2	–	7	–	0	2	–	9	–	0
Indiana	0	–	9	–	0	0	–	11	–	0
$ – Conference champion; Rankings from AP Poll

1984 Mid-American Conference football standings
	Conf.					Overall
Team	W		L		T	W		L		T
Toledo $	7	–	1	–	1	8	–	3	–	1
Bowling Green	7	–	2	–	0	8	–	3	–	0
Central Michigan	6	–	2	–	1	8	–	2	–	1
Ohio	4	–	4	–	1	4	–	6	–	1
Northern Illinois	3	–	5	–	1	4	–	6	–	1
Miami (OH)	3	–	5	–	0	4	–	7	–	0
Ball State	3	–	5	–	0	3	–	8	–	0
Western Michigan	3	–	6	–	0	5	–	6	–	0
Kent State	3	–	6	–	0	4	–	7	–	0
Eastern Michigan	2	–	5	–	2	2	–	7	–	2
$ – Conference champion

1984 Missouri Valley Conference football standings
	Conf.					Overall
Team	W		L		T	W		L		T
Tulsa $	5	–	0	–	0	6	–	5	–	0
No. 5 Indiana State ^	4	–	1	–	0	9	–	3	–	0
Illinois State	3	–	2	–	0	5	–	6	–	0
West Texas State	2	–	3	–	0	3	–	8	–	0
Wichita State	2	–	3	–	0	2	–	9	–	0
Drake	2	–	3	–	0	4	–	7	–	0
Southern Illinois	0	–	5	–	0	3	–	8	–	0
$ – Conference champion; ^ – NCAA Division I-AA playoff participant; Indiana State's game against Louisville and West Texas State and Wichita State's games against New Mexico State counted in the conference standings. The conference was a hybrid of NCAA Division I-A and I-AA programs. Tulsa and Wichita State were I-A and the other teams were I-AA.; Rankings from NCAA Division I-AA Football Committee poll

1984 Pacific Coast Athletic Association football standings
	Conf.					Overall
Team	W		L		T	W		L		T
Cal State Fullerton $	7	–	0	–	0	12	–	0	–	0
San Jose State	6	–	1	–	0	7	–	4	–	0
Fresno State	4	–	3	–	0	7	–	5	–	0
Long Beach State	4	–	3	–	0	5	–	6	–	0
Pacific (CA)	3	–	4	–	0	5	–	6	–	0
Utah State	2	–	5	–	0	2	–	9	–	0
New Mexico State	1	–	6	–	0	2	–	9	–	0
UNLV	0	–	7	–	0	0	–	13	–	0
$ – Conference champion; Records adjusted for UNLV's forfeit of all 11 victories

1984 Pacific-10 Conference football standings
	Conf.					Overall
Team	W		L		T	W		L		T
No. 10 USC $	7	–	1	–	0	9	–	3	–	0
No. 2 Washington	6	–	1	–	0	11	–	1	–	0
No. 9 UCLA	5	–	2	–	0	9	–	3	–	0
Arizona	5	–	2	–	0	7	–	4	–	0
Washington State	4	–	3	–	0	6	–	5	–	0
Arizona State	3	–	4	–	0	5	–	6	–	0
Oregon	3	–	5	–	0	6	–	5	–	0
Stanford	3	–	5	–	0	5	–	6	–	0
Oregon State	1	–	7	–	0	2	–	9	–	0
California	1	–	8	–	0	2	–	9	–	0
$ – Conference champion; Rankings from AP Poll

1984 Southeastern Conference football standings
	Conf.					Overall
Team	W		L		T	W		L		T
No. 3 Florida	5	–	0	–	1	9	–	1	–	1
No. 15 LSU	4	–	1	–	1	8	–	3	–	1
No. 14 Auburn	4	–	2	–	0	9	–	4	–	0
Georgia	4	–	2	–	0	7	–	4	–	1
No. 19 Kentucky	3	–	3	–	0	9	–	3	–	0
Tennessee	3	–	3	–	0	7	–	4	–	1
Vanderbilt	2	–	4	–	0	5	–	6	–	0
Alabama	2	–	4	–	0	5	–	6	–	0
Ole Miss	1	–	5	–	0	4	–	6	–	1
Mississippi State	1	–	5	–	0	4	–	7	–	0
$ – Conference champion; Florida was assessed a postseason ban following an NCAA investigation, and the SEC subsequently vacated any championship. The Sugar Bowl automatic bid for the conference champion was awarded to LSU. Under modern rules, LSU would be credited with the conference championship.; Rankings from AP Poll

1984 Southwest Conference football standings
	Conf.					Overall
Team	W		L		T	W		L		T
No. 8 SMU +	6	–	2	–	0	10	–	2	–	0
Houston +	6	–	2	–	0	7	–	5	–	0
TCU	5	–	3	–	0	8	–	4	–	0
Arkansas	5	–	3	–	0	7	–	4	–	1
Texas	5	–	3	–	0	7	–	4	–	1
Baylor	4	–	4	–	0	5	–	6	–	0
Texas A&M	3	–	5	–	0	6	–	5	–	0
Texas Tech	2	–	6	–	0	4	–	7	–	0
Rice	0	–	8	–	0	1	–	10	–	0
+ – Conference co-champions; Rankings from AP Poll

1984 Western Athletic Conference football standings
	Conf.					Overall
Team	W		L		T	W		L		T
No. 1 BYU $	8	–	0	–	0	13	–	0	–	0
Hawaii	5	–	2	–	0	7	–	4	–	0
Air Force	4	–	3	–	0	8	–	4	–	0
Utah	4	–	3	–	1	6	–	5	–	1
San Diego State	4	–	3	–	1	4	–	7	–	1
Wyoming	4	–	4	–	0	6	–	6	–	0
Colorado State	3	–	5	–	0	3	–	8	–	0
New Mexico	1	–	7	–	0	4	–	8	–	0
UTEP	1	–	7	–	0	2	–	9	–	0
$ – Conference champion; Rankings from AP Poll

1984 NCAA Division I-A independents football records
	Conf.					Overall
Team	W		L		T	W		L		T
No. 5 Boston College		–		–		10	–	2	–	0
No. 11 South Carolina		–		–		10	–	2	–	0
Army		–		–		8	–	3	–	1
Rutgers		–		–		7	–	3	–	0
No. 17 Florida State		–		–		7	–	3	–	2
Virginia Tech		–		–		8	–	4	–	0
West Virginia		–		–		8	–	4	–	0
No. 18 Miami (FL)		–		–		8	–	5	–	0
Notre Dame		–		–		7	–	5	–	0
Temple		–		–		6	–	5	–	0
Southwestern Louisiana		–		–		6	–	5	–	0
Penn State		–		–		6	–	5	–	0
Syracuse		–		–		6	–	5	–	0
Memphis State		–		–		5	–	5	–	1
Navy		–		–		4	–	6	–	1
Southern Miss		–		–		4	–	7	–	0
Pittsburgh		–		–		3	–	7	–	1
Tulane		–		–		3	–	8	–	0
Cincinnati		–		–		2	–	9	–	0
East Carolina		–		–		2	–	9	–	0
Louisville		–		–		2	–	9	–	0
Rankings from AP Poll

== Final AP poll ==
1. BYU
2. Washington
3. Florida
4. Nebraska
5. Boston College
6. Oklahoma
7. Oklahoma State
8. SMU
9. UCLA
10. USC
11. South Carolina
12. Maryland
13. Ohio State
14. Auburn
15. LSU
16. Iowa
17. Florida State
18. Miami (FL)
19. Kentucky
20. Virginia

== Coaches Final Poll ==
1. BYU
2. Washington
3. Nebraska
4. Boston College
5. Oklahoma State
6. Oklahoma
7. Florida
8. SMU
9. University of Southern California
10. UCLA
11. Maryland
12. Ohio State
13. South Carolina
14. Auburn
15. Iowa
16. LSU
17. Virginia
18. West Virginia
19. Kentucky
20. Florida St.

== Notable rivalry games ==
- SMU 26, Texas Christian 17
- Alabama 17, Auburn 15
- West Virginia 28, Pitt 10
- Texas Christian 38, Baylor 28
- Arizona 16, Arizona State 10
- Florida State 38, Miami (FL) 3
- Florida 27, Florida State 17
- Florida 27, Georgia 0
- Georgia Tech 35, Georgia 18
- Iowa 59, Iowa State 21
- LSU 33, Tulane 15
- Michigan State 19, Michigan 7
- Army 28, Navy 11
- Notre Dame 19, USC 7
- Ohio State 21, Michigan 6
- Oklahoma 17, Nebraska 7
- Oklahoma 24, Oklahoma State 14
- Oregon 31, Oregon State 6
- South Carolina 22, Clemson 21
- Texas 15, Oklahoma 15
- UCLA 29, USC 10
- Washington 38, Washington State 29
- Minnesota 17, Wisconsin 14
- BYU 24, Utah 14
- Texas A&M 37, Texas 12
- Pitt 31, Penn State 11
- Kansas State 24, Kansas 7

== I-AA team wins over I-A teams ==
Italics denotes I-AA teams.

Date	Visiting team	Home team	Site	Result	Attendance	Ref.
September 1	Southwestern Louisiana	Chattanooga	Chamberlain Field • Chattanooga, Tennessee	7–9	9,438	
September 1	Ball State	UMass	Warren McGuirk Alumni Stadium • Hadley, Massachusetts	10–26	8,946	
September 1	Murray State	Louisville	Cardinal Stadium • Louisville, Kentucky	26–23	24,557	
September 1	Eastern Michigan	Youngstown State	Stambaugh Stadium • Youngstown, Ohio	7–31		
September 15	Furman	NC State	Carter–Finley Stadium • Raleigh, North Carolina	34–30	37,200	
September 15	Northeast Louisiana	Southwestern Louisiana	Cajun Field • Lafayette, Louisiana (Battle on the Bayou)	7–6	23,531	
September 15	Eastern Michigan	Marshall	Fairfield Stadium • Huntington, West Virginia	17–24		
September 15	Youngstown State	Cincinnati	Nippert Stadium • Cincinnati, Ohio	27–23		
September 29	Oregon State	Idaho	Kibbie Dome • Moscow, Idaho	22–41	10,700	
October 6	Indiana State	Ball State	Hoosier Dome • Indianapolis, Indiana (Blue Key Victory Bell)	34–6	20,242	
October 13	UT Arlington	Wichita State	Cessna Stadium • Wichita, Kansas	17–15	15,234	
October 13	No. 1 (I-AA) Indiana State	Louisville	Cardinal Stadium • Louisville, Kentucky	44–21	25,051	
October 20	Delaware	Temple	Veterans Stadium • Philadelphia, Pennsylvania	34–19	9,526	
November 3	Northwestern State	Southern Miss	M. M. Roberts Stadium • Hattiesburg, Mississippi	22–0	24,682	
November 10	Southwestern Louisiana	McNeese State	Cowboy Stadium • Lake Charles, Louisiana (Cajun Crown)	17–30	23,000	
November 10	Tennessee State	Louisville	Cardinal Stadium • Louisville, Kentucky	24–15	23,821	
November 17	Montana State	Fresno State	Bulldog Stadium • Fresno, California	35–31	24,088	
^{#}Rankings from AP Poll released prior to game.

== Bowl games ==
De facto national championship:

- Holiday Bowl: No. 1 Brigham Young 24, Michigan 17

New Year's Day Bowls:

- Orange Bowl: No. 4 Washington 28, No. 2 Oklahoma 17
- Sugar Bowl: No. 5 Nebraska 28, No. 11 LSU 10
- Rose Bowl: No. 18 USC 20, No. 6 Ohio State 17
- Cotton Bowl: No. 8 Boston College 45, Houston 28
- Fiesta Bowl: No. 14 UCLA 39, No. 13 Miami (FL) 37

Other Bowls:

- Gator Bowl: No. 9 Oklahoma State 21, No. 7 South Carolina 14
- Aloha Bowl: No. 10 Southern Methodist 27, No. 17 Notre Dame 20
- Florida Citrus: No. 15 Florida State 17, Georgia 17
- Liberty Bowl: No. 16 Auburn 21, Arkansas 15
- Freedom Bowl: Iowa 55, No. 19 Texas 17
- Hall of Fame Bowl: Kentucky 20, No. 20 Wisconsin 19
- Peach Bowl: Virginia 27, Purdue 24
- Sun Bowl: No. 12 Maryland 28, Tennessee 27
- Independence Bowl: Air Force 23, Virginia Tech 7
- Bluebonnet Bowl: West Virginia 31, Texas Christian 14
- Cherry Bowl: Army 10, Michigan State 6
- California Bowl: UNLV 30, Toledo 13^

^UNLV forfeits win to Toledo.

== Heisman Trophy voting ==
The Heisman Trophy is given to the year's most outstanding player

Player	School	Position	1st	2nd	3rd	Total
Doug Flutie	Boston College	QB	678	87	32	2,240
Keith Byars	Ohio State	RB	87	427	136	1,251
Robbie Bosco	BYU	QB	20	95	193	443
Bernie Kosar	Miami (FL)	QB	9	76	141	320
Kenneth Davis	TCU	RB	6	16	36	86
Bill Fralic	Pittsburgh	OT	1	24	30	81
Chuck Long	Iowa	QB	2	6	19	37
Greg Allen	Florida State	RB	0	10	17	37
Jerry Rice	Mississippi Valley State	WR	3	9	9	36
Rueben Mayes	Washington State	RB	1	7	15	32

== Other annual awards ==
- Maxwell Award (College Player of the Year) – Doug Flutie, Boston College
- Walter Camp Award (Back) – Doug Flutie, Boston College
- Davey O'Brien Award (Quarterback) – Doug Flutie, Boston College
- Lombardi Award (Lineman or Linebacker) – Tony Degrate, Texas
- Outland Trophy (Interior Lineman) – Bruce Smith, Virginia Tech
- Paul "Bear" Bryant Award – LaVell Edwards, BYU

== Attendances ==
Average home attendance top 3:

Rank	Team	Average
1	Michigan Wolverines	103,819
2	Tennessee Volunteers	93,515
3	Ohio State Buckeyes	89,449
