= 1984 Aloha Bowl =

American college football game

Notre Dame Fighting Irish	SMU Mustangs
(7–4)	(9–2)
20	27
Head coach: Gerry Faust	Head coach: Bobby Collins
AP / Coaches; 17 / 18	AP / Coaches; 10 / 10
	1	2	3	4	Total
Notre Dame	0	10	7	3	20
SMU	7	10	0	10	27
- Date: December 29, 1984
- Season: 1984
- Stadium: Aloha Stadium
- Location: Honolulu, Hawaii
- Referee: Vance Carlson (Big Eight)
- Attendance: 41,777

United States TV coverage
- Network: TCS/Metrosports
- Announcers: Harry Kalas, George Connor, and Jack Snow

The 1984 Aloha Bowl, part of the 1984 bowl game season and the third Aloha Bowl, took place on December 29, 1984, at Aloha Stadium in Honolulu, Hawaii. The game featured the Notre Dame Fighting Irish, and the SMU Mustangs of the Southwest Conference, meeting for the first time in 26 years. SMU won the game 27–20 in front of a then Aloha Bowl-record crowd of 41,777. This was SMU's last bowl game appearance and bowl win before the Death penalty shut the program down in 1987 as a result of a scandal.

== Game summary ==
SMU scored on its first two offensive possessions, on a seven-yard touchdown carry by Jeff Atkins and later Don King's 12-yard pass to Cobby Morrison gave the Mustangs a 14–0 lead. Notre Dame responded with 10 unanswered points before Brandy Brownlee connected on a 47-yard field goal to give SMU a 17–10 lead at halftime.

The Fighting Irish tied the game on Mark Brooks' 11-yard touchdown run in the third quarter, but SMU regained the lead on its next possession with Brownlee's second field goal of the game. The Mustangs were able to work on the clock for most of the second half due to the strong running of Atkins and Reggie Dupard, each of whom ran for more than 100 yards in the contest. Dupard's two-yard scoring run gave SMU a 10-point lead with six minutes left in the game and the Mustangs held off a late Notre Dame rally to win, 27–20. Dupard rushed for 103 yards.

== Statistics ==
Statistics	SMU	Notre Dame
First downs	26	22
Yards rushing	280	250
Yards passing	153	144
Total offense - Yards	379	362
Punts-Average	5-41.0	4-41.5
Fumbles-Lost	4-0	0-0
Interceptions	0	0
Penalties-Yards	5-55	5-44

Rushing SMU - Atkins 17-112 Notre Dame - Pinkett 24-136

Passing SMU - King 9-17-153 Notre Dame - Beuerlein 11-23-144

Receiving SMU - Atkins 2-31, Hashaway 2-27, Morris 2-27 Notre Dame - Jefferson 2-37, Howard 2-24, Bavaro 2-16
