= 1984 Tennessee Volunteers football team =

American college football season

1984 Tennessee Volunteers football

Sun Bowl, L 27–28 vs. Maryland
- Conference: Southeastern Conference
- Record: 7–4–1 (3–3 SEC)
- Head coach: Johnny Majors (8th season)
- Offensive coordinator: Walt Harris (2nd season)
- Defensive coordinator: Larry Marmie (2nd season)
- Captains: Johnnie Jones; Carl Zander
- Home stadium: Neyland Stadium

1984 Southeastern Conference football standings
	Conf.					Overall
Team	W		L		T	W		L		T
No. 3 Florida	5	–	0	–	1	9	–	1	–	1
No. 15 LSU	4	–	1	–	1	8	–	3	–	1
No. 14 Auburn	4	–	2	–	0	9	–	4	–	0
Georgia	4	–	2	–	0	7	–	4	–	1
No. 19 Kentucky	3	–	3	–	0	9	–	3	–	0
Tennessee	3	–	3	–	0	7	–	4	–	1
Vanderbilt	2	–	4	–	0	5	–	6	–	0
Alabama	2	–	4	–	0	5	–	6	–	0
Ole Miss	1	–	5	–	0	4	–	6	–	1
Mississippi State	1	–	5	–	0	4	–	7	–	0
$ – Conference champion; Florida was assessed a postseason ban following an NCAA investigation, and the SEC subsequently vacated any championship. The Sugar Bowl automatic bid for the conference champion was awarded to LSU. Under modern rules, LSU would be credited with the conference championship.; Rankings from AP Poll

The 1984 Tennessee Volunteers football team (variously "Tennessee", "UT" or the "Vols") represented the University of Tennessee in the 1984 NCAA Division I-A football season. Playing as a member of the Southeastern Conference (SEC), the team was led by head coach Johnny Majors, in his eighth year, and played their home games at Neyland Stadium in Knoxville, Tennessee. They finished the season with a record of seven wins, four losses and one tie (7–4–1 overall, 3–3 in the SEC) and a loss against Maryland in the Sun Bowl. The Volunteers offense scored 327 points while the defense allowed 276 points.

== Schedule ==
Date	Opponent	Site	TV	Result	Attendance	Source
September 1	Washington State*	Neyland Stadium; Knoxville, TN		W 34–27	93,727	
September 15	Utah*	Neyland Stadium; Knoxville, TN		W 27–21	93,077	
September 22	Army*	Neyland Stadium; Knoxville, TN		T 24–24	89,639	
September 29	at No. 20 Auburn	Jordan–Hare Stadium; Auburn, AL	TBS	L 10–29	75,076	
October 13	No. 18 Florida	Neyland Stadium; Knoxville, TN (rivalry)		L 30–43	94,016	
October 20	Alabama	Neyland Stadium; Knoxville, TN (Third Saturday in October)		W 28–27	95,422	
October 27	at Georgia Tech*	Grant Field; Atlanta, GA		W 24–21	45,167	
November 10	Memphis State*^{†}	Neyland Stadium; Knoxville, TN		W 41–9	94,930	
November 17	at Ole Miss	Mississippi Veterans Memorial Stadium; Jackson, MS (rivalry)		W 41–17	34,232	
November 24	Kentucky	Neyland Stadium; Knoxville, TN (rivalry)		L 12–17	93,791	
December 1	at Vanderbilt	Vanderbilt Stadium; Nashville, TN	TBS	W 29–13	41,497	
December 22	vs. No. 12 Maryland*	Sun Bowl; El Paso, TX (Sun Bowl)	CBS	L 27–28	50,126	
*Non-conference game; ^{†}Homecoming; Rankings from AP Poll released prior to the game

== Game summaries ==
=== Florida ===
Florida Gators (3–1–1) at Tennessee Volunteers (2–1–1)

Quarter	1	2	3	4	Total
Florida	13	10	0	20	43
Tennessee	10	3	3	14	30

at Neyland Stadium, Knoxville, Tennessee

- Date: October 13
- Game weather: Sunny
- Game attendance: 94,016

Game information

First quarter

- UT – Tim McGee 52-yard pass from Tony Robinson (Fuad Reveiz kick). Tennessee 7–0. Drive:
- FLA – Frankie Neal 50-yard pass from Kerwin Bell (Bobby Raymond kick), 1:28. Tie 7–7. Drive:
- UT – Fuad Reveiz 26-yard field goal. Tennessee 10–7. Drive:
- FLA – Neal Anderson 80-yard run (kick failed). Florida 13–10. Drive:

Second quarter

- UT – Fuad Reveiz 40-yard field goal. Tie 13–13. Drive:
- FLA – Chris Perkins 51-yard field goal. Florida 16–13. Drive:
- FLA – Ricky Nattiel 8-yard run (Bobby Raymond kick). Florida 23–13. Drive: 16 plays.

Third quarter

- UT – Fuad Reveiz 35-yard field goal. Florida 23–16. Drive:

Fourth quarter

- FLA – Bobby Raymond 42-yard field goal. Florida 26–16. Drive:
- FLA – Bobby Raymond 41-yard field goal. Florida 29–16. Drive:
- UT – Joey Clinkscales 48-yard pass from Tony Robinson (Fuad Reveiz kick). Florida 29–23. Drive:
- FLA – Ray McDonald 13-yard pass from Kerwin Bell (Bobby Raymond kick). Florida 36–23. Drive:
- UT – Johnnie Jones 4-yard run (Fuad Reveiz kick), 7:23. Florida 36–30. Drive:
- FLA – John L. Williams 47-yard run (Bobby Raymond kick), 0:54. Florida 43–30. Drive:

Top passers

- FLA – Kerwin Bell – 9/12, 201 yards, 2 TD, INT
- UT – Tony Robinson – 29/43, 371 yards, 2 TD, INT

Top rushers

- FLA – Neal Anderson – 23 rushes, 178 yards, TD
- UT – Johnnie Jones – 17 rushes, 94 yards, TD

Top receivers

- FLA – John L. Williams – 4 receptions, 96 yards
- UT – Tim McGee – 10 receptions, 157 yards, TD

Actor David Keith led the team on the field through the 'T'.

== Personnel ==
1984 Tennessee Volunteers football team roster
Players
Coaches
Offense

Pos.	#	Name	Class
WR	3	Nate Middlebrooks	Fr
WR	6	Tony Nelson	Fr
WR	9	Vince Carter	Fr
WR	10	Bill Eichholtz	Sr
QB	10	Tony Robinson	Jr
QB	11	Daryl Dickey	Jr
QB	12	Randy Sanders	Fr
WR	13	Jerome Jimmerson	Sr
QB	17	Greg Hargis	Fr
WR	18	Troy Hale	So
QB	19	Jeff Francis	Fr
WR	23	Wesley Pryor	So
RB	24	Rodney Ballard	Fr
RB	25	Jim Miller	So
RB	28	Keith Davis	Fr
RB	30	B.B. Cooper	Sr
RB	32	Charles Wilson	Fr
RB	33	Johnnie Jones	Sr
RB	34	Jesse Martin	Fr
RB	35	William Howard	Fr
WR	36	Pete Pansuka	So
RB	38	Reggie Brown	Fr
RB	43	Sam Henderson	Jr
G	52	Raleigh McKenzie	Sr
G	58	Bob Jenkins	Fr
G	63	Randy Atchley	Sr
G	63	Phil Stuart	Fr
C	66	Todd Kirk	Fr
G	67	Bill Mayo	Sr
OT	68	Bruce Wilkerson	So
C	69	Johnny Hibbett	So
OL	70	Todd Upton	Sr
G	72	Ray Robinson	Fr
C	73	Joel Farmer	Jr
G	74	David Moon	Sr
G	76	Harry Galbreath	Fr
OT	78	David Douglas	Jr
OT	79	Tony Bartley	Fr
WR	80	Laron Brown	So
TE	81	Jeff Smith	Sr
TE	84	Bruce Garrett	So
WR	86	Terry McDaniel	Fr
WR	87	Joey Clinkscales	So
WR	88	Tim McGee	Jr
TE	89	Tim Hendrix	So
TE	90	John Cook	Sr
TE	91	Eric Melching	Fr
WR		Eric Swanson

Defense

Pos.	#	Name	Class
DB	1	Andre Creamer	Fr
OLB	1	Darell Jones	Fr
DB	5	Xavier Cook	Jr
DB	7	Chris White	Sr
DB	8	Victor Peppers	Fr
DB	14	Terry Brown	So
DB	15	Jack Sells	Sr
DB	16	Tommy Sims	Jr
DB	20	Charles Benton	So
DB	22	Charles Davis	So
DB	26	Vernon Bass	Fr
DB	29	Vince Clark	Sr
ILB	31	Jim Dunkin	Sr
DB	37	Bryan Coffey	Fr
DB	38	Eugene McIntyer	Fr
ILB	39	Duan Henry	Jr
DB	39	Tim Welch	Jr
ILB	40	Lavoisier Fisher	Jr
DB	41	Tony Miller	Fr
ILB	42	Joe Cofer	Jr
LB	44	Alvin Toles	Sr
LB	45	Carl Zander	Sr
ILB	46	Jesse Messimer	Fr
ILB	47	Doug Jones	Fr
ILB	48	David Walker	Fr
ILB	49	Kelly Ziegler	Fr
LB	51	Reggie McKenzie	Sr
OLB	53	Otis Coffey	Fr
LB	54	Dale Jones	Jr
OLB	55	Bryan Kimbro	Fr
DT	59	Mark Hovanic	Fr
DT	60	Tony Williams	So
DT	61	Gordon Roberts	Fr
DT	64	Steve Douglas	So
MG	65	Robby Scott	So
ILB	69	David Dodd	Fr
LB	71	Darrin Miller	Fr
DT	73	John Bruhin	So
DT	77	Richard Cooper	Fr
OLB	82	Charles Kimbrough	Fr
DT	82	Daryle Smith	So
DE	83	Ricky Holt	Sr
DT	94	Arthur Davis	Fr
DE	94	Johnny McAdams	Sr
MG	95	Fred Bennett	Fr
OLB	96	Tyrone Robinson	So
DT	97	Orlando Reyes	Fr
DE	97	Tony Simmons	Sr
MG	98	Richard Brown	Fr
DT	99	Allen King	Fr

Special teams

Pos.	#	Name	Class
K	4	Fuad Reveiz	Sr
P	21	Jimmy Colquitt	Sr

Head coach

- Johnny Majors

Coordinators/assistant coaches

- Walt Harris – Offensive coordinator/quarterbacks
- Doug Mathews – Running backs
- Kippy Brown – Wide receivers
- David Cutcliffe – Tight ends
- Phillip Fulmer – Offensive line
- Larry Marmie – Defensive coordinator/inside linebackers
- Bill Shaw – Defensive line
- Mel Foels – Outside linebackers
- Ron Zook – Defensive backs
- Gerald Brown – Graduate assistant
- Dennis Therrell – Graduate assistant

Legend

- (C) Team captain
- (S) Suspended
- (I) Ineligible
- Injured
- Redshirt

Roster

== Team players drafted into the NFL ==
Player	Position	Round	Pick	NFL club
Alvin Toles	Linebacker	1	24	New Orleans Saints
Carl Zander	Linebacker	2	43	Cincinnati Bengals
Johnnie Jones	Running back	5	137	Seattle Seahawks
Fuad Reveiz	Kicker	7	195	Miami Dolphins
Reggie McKenzie	Linebacker	10	275	Los Angeles Raiders
Raleigh McKenzie	Guard	11	290	Washington Redskins
Tony Simmons	Defensive end	12	318	San Diego Chargers
