= 1984 Mississippi State Bulldogs football team =

American college football season

1984 Mississippi State Bulldogs football
- Conference: Southeastern Conference
- Record: 4–7 (1–5 SEC)
- Head coach: Emory Bellard (6th season)
- Defensive coordinator: Melvin Robertson (6th season)
- Home stadium: Scott Field; Mississippi Veterans Memorial Stadium

1984 Southeastern Conference football standings
	Conf.					Overall
Team	W		L		T	W		L		T
No. 3 Florida	5	–	0	–	1	9	–	1	–	1
No. 15 LSU	4	–	1	–	1	8	–	3	–	1
No. 14 Auburn	4	–	2	–	0	9	–	4	–	0
Georgia	4	–	2	–	0	7	–	4	–	1
No. 19 Kentucky	3	–	3	–	0	9	–	3	–	0
Tennessee	3	–	3	–	0	7	–	4	–	1
Vanderbilt	2	–	4	–	0	5	–	6	–	0
Alabama	2	–	4	–	0	5	–	6	–	0
Ole Miss	1	–	5	–	0	4	–	6	–	1
Mississippi State	1	–	5	–	0	4	–	7	–	0
$ – Conference champion; Florida was assessed a postseason ban following an NCAA investigation, and the SEC subsequently vacated any championship. The Sugar Bowl automatic bid for the conference champion was awarded to LSU. Under modern rules, LSU would be credited with the conference championship.; Rankings from AP Poll

The 1984 Mississippi State Bulldogs football team represented Mississippi State University as a member of the Southeastern Conference (SEC) during the 1984 NCAA Division I-A football season. Led by sixth-year head coach Emory Bellard, the Bulldogs compiled an overall record of 4–7 with a mark of 1–5 in conference play, tying for ninth place in the SEC. Mississippi State played home games at Scott Field in Starkville, Mississippi.

== Schedule ==
Date	Opponent	Site	Result	Attendance	Source
September 1	at Tulane*	Louisiana Superdome; New Orleans, LA	W 30–3	38,695	
September 8	Colorado State*	Scott Field; Starkville, MS	W 14–9	27,236	
September 22	at Missouri*	Faurot Field; Columbia, MO	L 30–47	42,967	
September 29	at Florida	Florida Field; Gainesville, FL	L 12–27	68,186	
October 6	vs. Southern Miss*	Mississippi Veterans Memorial Stadium; Jackson, MS	W 27–18	50,136	
October 13	No. 19 Kentucky^{†}	Scott Field; Starkville, MS	L 13–17	30,395	
October 20	at Memphis State*	Liberty Bowl Memorial Stadium; Memphis, TN	L 12–23	26,997	
October 27	No. 12 Auburn	Scott Field; Starkville, MS	L 21–24	31,138	
November 3	Alabama	Mississippi Veterans Memorial Stadium; Jackson, MS (rivalry)	L 20–24	45,868	
November 17	No. 9 LSU	Scott Field; Starkville, MS (rivalry)	W 16–14	30,556	
November 24	vs. Ole Miss	Mississippi Veterans Memorial Stadium; Jackson, MS (Egg Bowl)	L 3–24	52,766	
*Non-conference game; ^{†}Homecoming; Rankings from AP Poll released prior to the game
