= 1984 Florida Gators football team =

American college football season

1984 Florida Gators football

SEC champion (vacated)
- Conference: Southeastern Conference

Ranking
- Coaches: No. 7
- AP: No. 3
- Record: 9–1–1 (5–0–1 SEC)
- Head coach: Charley Pell (6th season; first 3 games); Galen Hall (interim; final 8 games)
- Offensive coordinator: Galen Hall (1st season)
- Defensive coordinator: Joe Kines (4th season)
- Home stadium: Florida Field

1984 Southeastern Conference football standings
	Conf.					Overall
Team	W		L		T	W		L		T
No. 3 Florida	5	–	0	–	1	9	–	1	–	1
No. 15 LSU	4	–	1	–	1	8	–	3	–	1
No. 14 Auburn	4	–	2	–	0	9	–	4	–	0
Georgia	4	–	2	–	0	7	–	4	–	1
No. 19 Kentucky	3	–	3	–	0	9	–	3	–	0
Tennessee	3	–	3	–	0	7	–	4	–	1
Vanderbilt	2	–	4	–	0	5	–	6	–	0
Alabama	2	–	4	–	0	5	–	6	–	0
Ole Miss	1	–	5	–	0	4	–	6	–	1
Mississippi State	1	–	5	–	0	4	–	7	–	0
$ – Conference champion; Florida was assessed a postseason ban following an NCAA investigation, and the SEC subsequently vacated any championship. The Sugar Bowl automatic bid for the conference champion was awarded to LSU. Under modern rules, LSU would be credited with the conference championship.; Rankings from AP Poll

The 1984 Florida Gators football team represented the University of Florida during the 1984 NCAA Division I-A football season. The campaign was Charley Pell's sixth and last as the head coach of the Florida Gators football team, as he was forced to resign three games into the season after the release of an NCAA report detailing numerous recruiting and other rules violations committed during his tenure at Florida. Offensive coordinator Galen Hall had been hired the previous summer and was not implicated in the scandal, so he was named interim head coach.

After starting the season 1–1–1 under Pell, the Gators went 8–0 under Hall to post a 9–1–1 overall record, including 5–0–1 in the Southeastern Conference (SEC), and Hall was named the SEC Coach of the Year. Florida was ranked #3 in the final Associated Press poll - the highest finish in program history up to that time - and were declared national champions by several selectors, including the New York Times computer poll and The Sporting News. However, due to NCAA sanctions, the Gators were not permitted to participate in a bowl game.

Florida led the SEC in both points scored (31 points per game) and points allowed (15.5 points per game). The balanced offense featured freshman quarterback and SEC Player of the Year Kerwin Bell, three running backs who would be NFL first round draft picks in John L. Williams, Neal Anderson, and Lorenzo Hampton, and another future first round pick in freshman wide receiver Ricky Nattiel. The offensive line was dubbed "The Great Wall of Florida" and featured several all-conference lineman, including yet another future first round pick in tackle Lomas Brown, helping Florida lead the conference in rushing with 240 yards per game. The defense featured two consensus all-conference players in noseguard Tim Newton and linebacker Alonzo Johnson.

No Florida football squad had ever been undefeated in the SEC or had won a conference championship, so there was much rejoicing in Gainesville when the 1984 team clinched the best record in the league in November. However, due to the NCAA violations committed under Pell, the title was retroactively vacated in May 1985 by a vote of the presidents of the SEC schools.

Florida would again top the conference standings in 1985 but had been declared ineligible for the SEC championship before the season began. The program did not win an officially recognized SEC football championship until 1991.

== Schedule ==
Date	Opponent	Rank	Site	TV	Result	Attendance	Source
September 1	vs. No. 10 Miami (FL)*	No. 17	Tampa Stadium; Tampa, FL (rivalry)	ESPN	L 20–32	72,813	
September 8	LSU		Florida Field; Gainesville, FL (rivalry)	TBS	T 21–21	70,197	
September 15	Tulane*		Florida Field; Gainesville, FL		W 63–21	65,265	
September 29	Mississippi State		Florida Field; Gainesville, FL		W 27–12	68,186	
October 6	Syracuse*		Florida Field; Gainesville, FL		W 16–0	70,189	
October 13	at Tennessee	No. 18	Neyland Stadium; Knoxville, TN (rivalry)		W 43–30	94,016	
October 20	Cincinnati*	No. 17	Florida Field; Gainesville, FL		W 48–17	73,690	
November 3	No. 11 Auburn	No. 13	Florida Field; Gainesville, FL (rivalry)	ABC	W 24–3	74,397	
November 10	vs. No. 8 Georgia	No. 10	Gator Bowl Stadium; Jacksonville, FL (rivalry)	CBS	W 27–0	82,349	
November 17	at Kentucky	No. 5	Commonwealth Stadium; Lexington, KY (rivalry)	TBS	W 25–17	52,823	
December 1	at No. 12 Florida State*	No. 3	Doak Campbell Stadium; Tallahassee, FL (rivalry)	ABC	W 27–17	58,930	
*Non-conference game; Rankings from AP Poll released prior to the game; Source:

== Personnel ==
1984 Florida Gators football team roster
Players
Coaches
Offense

Pos.	#	Name	Class
RB	27	Neal Anderson	Jr
QB	12	Kerwin Bell	Fr
QB		Rodney Brewer
OL		Phil Bromley
OL		Lomas Brown
RB		Reggie Corlew
OL		Jimmy Davis
OL		Jack Gerzina
RB		Lorenzo Hampton
RB		Joe Henderson
OL	60	Billy Hinson
TE		Rodney Jones
OL		Crawford Ker
RB		James Massey
WR		Ray McDonald
WR	89	Ricky Nattiel	So
WR	21	Frankie Neal	So
TE		Walter Odom
TE		Duncan Parham
TE		Tom Peddle
WR		Gary Rolle
WR		Linzey Smith
WR		Bret Wiechmann
RB		Anthony Williams
FB	22	John L. Williams	Jr
OL		Jeff Zimmerman

Defense

Pos.	#	Name	Class
LB		Scott Armstrong
S		Vernell Brown
DT		Tommy Duhart
DB		Ricky Easmon
DL		Sam Garland
LB		Alonzo Johnson
LB		Mark Korff
LB		Patrick Miller
LB		Alonzo Mitz
LB		Ron Moten
DL		Tim Newton
LB		Leon Pennington
DB		Roger Sibbald
DB		Curtis Stacey
DT		Don Tinny
DB		Adrian White
CB		Jarvis Williams
DL		Keith Williams

Special teams

Pos.	#	Name	Class
P		Ray Criswell
P		David Nadone
K		Chris Perkins
K		Bobby Raymond	Sr

Head coach

- Charley Pell (first three games)
- Galen Hall (remaining eight games)

Coordinators/assistant coaches

- Galen Hall (OC)
- Joe Kines (DC)
- Mike Heimerdinger (WR)
- Charlie Strong (GA)
- Gunnar Paulson (GA)

Legend

- (C) Team captain
- (S) Suspended
- (I) Ineligible
- Injured
- Redshirt

== Game summaries ==
=== Vs. Miami (FL) ===
#10 Miami (FL) vs. #17 Florida

Team	1	2	3	4	Total
• Hurricanes	3	13	3	13	32
Gators	3	7	3	7	20

- Date: September 1
- Location: Tampa Stadium, Tampa, FL
- Television network: ESPN

Scoring summary
1		MIA	Cox 29-yard field goal	MIA 3–0
1		FLA	Raymond 44-yard field goal	Tie 3–3
2		FLA	Hampton 64-yard run (Raymond kick)	FLA 10–3
2		MIA	Cox 20-yard field goal	FLA 10–6
2		MIA	Oliver 21-yard run (Cox kick)	MIA 13–10
2		MIA	Cox 27-yard field goal	MIA 16–10
3		MIA	Cox 25-yard field goal	MIA 19–10
3		FLA	Raymond 30-yard field goal	MIA 19–13
4	0:41	FLA	Neal 5-yard pass from Bell (Raymond kick)	FLA 20–19
4	0:07	MIA	Brown 12-yard pass from Kosar (Cox kick)	MIA 26–20
4	0:00	MIA	Bain 59-yard interception return	MIA 32–20

The Florida Gators opened the 1984 season with a neutral site clash at Tampa Stadium against their in-state rival and defending national champion Miami Hurricanes. The game was nationally televised by ESPN as the second game of a double-header on the network's first day broadcasting live college football.

Redshirt freshman Kerwin Bell unexpectedly became Florida's starting quarterback four days before the game when senior Dale Dorminey suffered a serious knee injury in practice. Supported by an effective rushing attack, Bell played well in his first collegiate appearance, and the game was close throughout. With his team down by six points late in the fourth quarter, Bell led the Gators on a long drive that culminated with a touchdown pass that gave them a 20-19 lead with under a minute remaining. However, Miami senior quarterback Bernie Kosar quickly led the Hurricanes down the field and threw a responding touchdown pass with six seconds left, putting Miami back ahead 26-20. The Gators lined up for one last play deep in their own territory with one second left. Bell threw a Hail Mary pass that was intercepted by Miami defensive back Tolbert Bain and returned for touchdown as time expired, giving Miami a 32–20 victory and covering the point spread, as the Hurricanes had been a 6.5 point favorite.

=== At Tennessee ===
Florida Gators (3–1–1) at Tennessee Volunteers (2–1–1)

Quarter	1	2	3	4	Total
Florida	13	10	0	20	43
Tennessee	10	3	3	14	30

at Neyland Stadium, Knoxville, Tennessee

- Date: October 13
- Game weather: Sunny
- Game attendance: 94,016

Game information

First quarter

- UT – Tim McGee 52-yard pass from Tony Robinson (Fuad Reveiz kick). Tennessee 7–0. Drive:
- FLA – Frankie Neal 50-yard pass from Kerwin Bell (Bobby Raymond kick), 1:28. Tie 7–7. Drive:
- UT – Fuad Reveiz 26-yard field goal. Tennessee 10–7. Drive:
- FLA – Neal Anderson 80-yard run (kick failed). Florida 13–10. Drive:

Second quarter

- UT – Fuad Reveiz 40-yard field goal. Tie 13–13. Drive:
- FLA – Chris Perkins 51-yard field goal. Florida 16–13. Drive:
- FLA – Ricky Nattiel 8-yard run (Bobby Raymond kick). Florida 23–13. Drive: 16 plays.

Third quarter

- UT – Fuad Reveiz 35-yard field goal. Florida 23–16. Drive:

Fourth quarter

- FLA – Bobby Raymond 42-yard field goal. Florida 26–16. Drive:
- FLA – Bobby Raymond 41-yard field goal. Florida 29–16. Drive:
- UT – Joey Clinkscales 48-yard pass from Tony Robinson (Fuad Reveiz kick). Florida 29–23. Drive:
- FLA – Ray McDonald 13-yard pass from Kerwin Bell (Bobby Raymond kick). Florida 36–23. Drive:
- UT – Johnnie Jones 4-yard run (Fuad Reveiz kick), 7:23. Florida 36–30. Drive:
- FLA – John L. Williams 47-yard run (Bobby Raymond kick), 0:54. Florida 43–30. Drive:

Top passers

- FLA – Kerwin Bell – 9/12, 201 yards, 2 TD, INT
- UT – Tony Robinson – 29/43, 371 yards, 2 TD, INT

Top rushers

- FLA – Neal Anderson – 23 rushes, 178 yards, TD
- UT – Johnnie Jones – 17 rushes, 94 yards, TD

Top receivers

- FLA – John L. Williams – 4 receptions, 96 yards
- UT – Tim McGee – 10 receptions, 157 yards, TD

- John L. Williams led the team in receiving and added 100 yards on the ground.
- The game featured 1,060 total yards and 47 first downs.

=== Vs. Georgia ===
After suffering several defeats to the Bulldogs with a conference championship at stake, the Gators entered the rivalry game in Jacksonville undefeated in the SEC. The Gators dominated early, building a 17–0 lead by early in the second half. Georgia seemed to come alive in the third quarter, mounting a long time-consuming drive into Florida territory. However, they were stopped near Florida's goal line on a fourth down play, giving the Gators the ball inside their own one yard line. On the third play following the change of possession, Gator quarterback Kerwin Bell dropped back into his own end zone and lofted a long pass down the sideline to wide receiver Ricky Nattiel, who went 96 yards for a touchdown. Florida regained the momentum and went on to win 27–0, their largest margin of victory in the series at the time.

=== Kentucky ===
Team	1	2	3	4	Total
• Florida	3	9	7	6	25
Kentucky	3	0	7	7	17

- Date: November 17
- Game attendance: 52,823

Scoring summary
Q1	FLA	Raymond 30 yard field goal	FLA 3–0
Q1	KEN	Worley 50 yard field goal	Tie 3–3
Q2	FLA	Raymond 38 yard field goal	FLA 6–3
Q2	FLA	Raymond 27 yard field goal	FLA 9–3
Q2	FLA	Raymond 30 yard field goal	FLA 12–3
Q3	KEN	Phillips 7 yard pass from Ransdell (Worley kick)	FLA 12–10
Q3	FLA	Neal 9 yard pass from Bell (Raymond kick)	FLA 19–10
Q4	FLA	Raymond 36 yard field goal	FLA 22–10
Q4	KEN	Phillips 8 yard pass from Ransdell (Worley kick)	FLA 22–17
Q4	FLA	Raymond 43 yard field goal	FLA 25–17

== Postseason ==
Despite winning the SEC title, the Gators were barred from going to the 1985 Sugar Bowl due to the violations committed under Pell; runner-up LSU went in their place. On May 30, 1985, the presidents of the ten SEC-member universities voted 6–4 to vacate the Gators' 1984 SEC title and declared the team ineligible for the SEC championship during the upcoming 1985 and 1986 seasons because of the rule violations committed under Pell. The retroactive vacating of the 1984 championship, six months after the 1984 football season ended, drew an angry response from University of Florida president Marshall Criser, as well as Gators coaches, players and fans due to the retroactive nature of the decision and its perceived unfairness.
