= 1984 Ole Miss Rebels football team =

American college football season

1984 Ole Miss Rebels football
- Conference: Southeastern Conference
- Record: 4–6–1 (1–5 SEC)
- Head coach: Billy Brewer (2nd season)
- Offensive coordinator: Robert McGraw (2nd season)
- Defensive coordinator: Carl Torbush (2nd season)
- Home stadium: Vaught–Hemingway Stadium; Mississippi Veterans Memorial Stadium

1984 Southeastern Conference football standings
	Conf.					Overall
Team	W		L		T	W		L		T
No. 3 Florida	5	–	0	–	1	9	–	1	–	1
No. 15 LSU	4	–	1	–	1	8	–	3	–	1
No. 14 Auburn	4	–	2	–	0	9	–	4	–	0
Georgia	4	–	2	–	0	7	–	4	–	1
No. 19 Kentucky	3	–	3	–	0	9	–	3	–	0
Tennessee	3	–	3	–	0	7	–	4	–	1
Vanderbilt	2	–	4	–	0	5	–	6	–	0
Alabama	2	–	4	–	0	5	–	6	–	0
Ole Miss	1	–	5	–	0	4	–	6	–	1
Mississippi State	1	–	5	–	0	4	–	7	–	0
$ – Conference champion; Florida was assessed a postseason ban following an NCAA investigation, and the SEC subsequently vacated any championship. The Sugar Bowl automatic bid for the conference champion was awarded to LSU. Under modern rules, LSU would be credited with the conference championship.; Rankings from AP Poll

The 1984 Ole Miss Rebels football team represented the University of Mississippi (Ole Miss) as a member of the Southeastern Conference (SEC) during the 1984 NCAA Division I-A football season. Led by second-year head coach Billy Brewer, the Rebels compiled an overall record of 4–6–1, with a mark of 1–5 in conference play, and finished tied for ninth in the SEC.

== Schedule ==
Date	Opponent	Site	TV	Result	Attendance	Source
September 8	Memphis State*	Vaught–Hemingway Stadium; Oxford, MS (rivalry)		W 22–6	41,564	
September 15	at Arkansas*	War Memorial Stadium; Little Rock, AR (rivalry)		T 14–14	55,480	
September 22	Louisiana Tech*	Vaught–Hemingway Stadium; Oxford, MS		W 14–8	28,413	
September 29	Tulane*	Vaught–Hemingway Stadium; Oxford, MS (rivalry)		W 19–14	33,866	
October 6	No. 18 Auburn	Vaught–Hemingway Stadium; Oxford, MS (rivalry)		L 13–17	35,387	
October 13	at No. 15 Georgia	Sanford Stadium; Athens, GA		L 12–18	82,122	
October 20	vs. Southern Miss*	Mississippi Veterans Memorial Stadium; Jackson, MS		L 10–13	57,000	
October 27	at Vanderbilt	Vanderbilt Stadium; Nashville, TN (rivalry)		L 20–37	41,263	
November 3	at No. 15 LSU	Tiger Stadium; Baton Rouge, LA (rivalry)	TigerVision	L 29–32	77,649	
November 17	Tennessee	Mississippi Veterans Memorial Stadium; Jackson, MS (rivalry)		L 17–41	34,232	
November 24	vs. Mississippi State	Mississippi Veterans Memorial Stadium; Jackson, MS (Egg Bowl)		W 24–3	52,766	
*Non-conference game; Rankings from AP Poll released prior to the game

== Personnel ==
1984 Ole Miss Rebels football team roster
Players
Coaches
Offense

Pos.	#	Name	Class
WR		J.R. Ambrose
QB		Kent Austin
OL		Bobby Clark
OL		Eric Denmark
RB		Willie Goodloe
RB		James Harbour
WR		Henry Hill
WR		Jamie Holder
RB		Arthur Humphrey
TE		Steve Joyner
QB		David McKinney
RB		Joe Mickles
WR		Tim Moffett
TE		Mario Perry
OL		Wayne Pierce
RB		Quintin Pitts
OL		Tony Rayburn
QB		Rusty Reed
WR		Andree Rodgers
OL		Eric Sheehan
TE		Michael Smith
RB		Robert Smith
RB		Thunder Smith
OL		Greg Walker
RB		Nathan Wonsley

Defense

Pos.	#	Name	Class
DB		Johnny Armstrong
DL		Bob Blakemore
LB		Dan Boyce
LB		Joe Brewer
DB		Lee Davis
DL		Mike Fitzsimmons
LB		Fuzzy Huddleston
LB		Reed Killion
DL		Freddie Joe Nunn
DL		Michael Portis
DL		Benton Reed
DB		Eric Truitt
DL		Jay Webb
DB		Barry Wilburn
DL		Terry Williamson

Special teams

Pos.	#	Name	Class
P		Brett Brewer
K		Jon Howard
P, K		Bill Smith

Head coach

- Billy Brewer

Coordinators/assistant coaches

Legend

- (C) Team captain
- (S) Suspended
- (I) Ineligible
- Injured
- Redshirt
