= Neal Anderson =

American football player (born 1964)

No. 35
- Position: Running back

Personal information
- Born: August 14, 1964 (age 62); Graceville, Florida, U.S.
- Listed height: 5 ft 11 in (1.80 m)
- Listed weight: 210 lb (95 kg)

Career information
- High school: Graceville
- College: Florida (1982–1985)
- NFL draft: 1986: 1st round, 27th overall pick

Career history
- Chicago Bears (1986–1993)

Awards and highlights
- Second-team All-Pro (1990); 4× Pro Bowl (1988–1991); 100 greatest Bears of All-Time; 2× Second-team All-SEC (1983, 1984); University of Florida Athletic Hall of Fame

Career NFL statistics
- Rushing yards: 6,166
- Rushing average: 4.1
- Receptions: 302
- Receiving yards: 2,763
- Total touchdowns: 71
- Stats at Pro Football Reference

Charles Neal Anderson (born August 14, 1964) is an American former professional football player who was a running back for eight seasons with the Chicago Bears of the National Football League (NFL) during the 1980s and 1990s. Anderson played college football for the Florida Gators. He was a first-round pick in the 1986 NFL draft and was a four-time Pro Bowl selection with the Bears.

== Early life ==
Anderson was born in Graceville, Florida in 1964. He attended Graceville High School, and played for the Graceville Tigers high school football team.

== College career ==
Anderson accepted an athletic scholarship to attend the University of Florida in Gainesville, Florida, where he played for Charley Pell and Galen Hall's Florida Gators football teams from 1982 to 1985, and shared the Gators' backfield with fullback John L. Williams for four years. Memorably, Anderson ran for 197 yards versus the Kentucky Wildcats as a freshman in 1982, a seventy-six-yard touchdown against the LSU Tigers in 1983, and 178 yards and an eighty-yard touchdown against the Tennessee Volunteers in 1984. He was a team captain in 1985, a first-team All-Southeastern Conference (SEC) selection in 1985, an Associated Press honorable mention All-American in 1984 and 1985, and the recipient of the Gators' Fergie Ferguson Award in 1985. In his four years as a Gator, Anderson had fourteen games with 100 yards or more rushing, 639 carries for 3,234 yards rushing and thirty touchdowns, forty-nine receptions for 525 yards receiving and two touchdowns, and ninety-seven yards passing. In terms of career rushing yardage, he remains the Gators' third all-time running back behind Errict Rhett and Emmitt Smith.

Behind the rushing of Anderson, the rushing and receiving of John L. Williams, the receiving of wide receiver Ricky Nattiel and the passing of quarterback Kerwin Bell, the Gators finished with identical best-in-the-SEC records of 9–1–1 in 1984 and 1985. Anderson graduated from Florida with a bachelor's degree in public relations in 1986, and was later inducted into the University of Florida Athletic Hall of Fame as a "Gator Great" in 1995. The sportswriters of The Gainesville Sun selected him as No. 13 among the top 100 all-time greatest Gators from the first 100 years of Florida football in 2006.

== Professional career ==
The Chicago Bears selected Anderson in the first round (27th pick overall) of the 1986 NFL draft. He played for the Bears for eight seasons from 1986 to 1993. He joined the franchise as a rookie immediately following the Bears' 1985 championship season. The Bears picked Anderson to back up, and eventually succeed, Walter Payton, who became the Bears and NFL's all-time rushing leader during his lengthy career. After Payton's retirement in 1987, Anderson became the team's starting running back.

Anderson's best years came during the late 1980s, where he rushed for over 1,000 yards in three consecutive seasons. In all three seasons, Anderson scored over ten touchdowns and averaged over four yards per carry. Ultimately, his best season came in 1989, when he rushed for 1,275 yards, received 434 yards, and scored 15 touchdowns. He was invited to the Pro Bowl in 1988, 1989, 1990 and 1991.

Over his eight-year career, Anderson appeared in 116 regular season games, and started 91 of them; he amassed 6,166 yards and scored 51 touchdowns rushing, and 2,763 yards and 20 touchdowns receiving—a career total of 71 touchdowns. Anderson's career was shortened by injuries and the Bears' fall-out during the early 1990s. He is currently the Bears' third all-time franchise rusher, behind Payton and Matt Forté.

Anderson says his favorite memory from his NFL career was December 2, 1990, when he scored a 50-yard game-winning touchdown on a pass from Jim Harbaugh against the Detroit Lions, which eliminated them from the playoffs and secured an appearance by the Bears. "I caught a touchdown pass against Detroit at the end of the game. And that put us in the playoffs. One of the few things I remember was being under the pile and everybody jumping on top of me. All of the guys in the locker room called me 'The Cuz.' And I could just hear people saying: 'The Cuz! The Cuz!'"

== NFL career statistics ==
Year	Team	GP	Rushing					Receiving				
Year	Team	GP	Att	Yds	Avg	Lng	TD	Rec	Yds	Avg	Lng	TD
1986	CHI	14	35	146	4.2	23	0	4	80	20.0	58	1
1987	CHI	11	129	586	4.5	38	3	47	467	9.9	59	3
1988	CHI	16	249	1,106	4.4	80	12	39	371	9.5	36	0
1989	CHI	16	274	1,275	4.7	73	11	50	434	8.7	49	4
1990	CHI	15	260	1,078	4.1	52	10	42	484	11.5	50	3
1991	CHI	13	210	747	3.6	42	6	47	368	7.8	26	3
1992	CHI	16	156	582	3.7	49	5	42	399	9.5	30	6
1993	CHI	15	202	646	3.2	45	4	31	160	5.2	35	0
Career		116	1,515	6,166	4.1	80	51	302	2,763	9.1	59	20

== Life after football ==
Anderson now lives with his wife and their three children in the Gainesville area, where he helped found a bank and owns a 2,000-acre (810 ha) peanut farm. He is active in the community. He is a big fan of professional wrestling and attended Wrestlemania XI.

In 1998, Anderson helped found, and is now on the board of directors of, Community Bank and Trust of Florida, a bank with 11 locations in and near Gainesville.

== See also ==
- Florida Gators football, 1980–89
- History of the Chicago Bears
- List of Chicago Bears first-round draft picks
- List of Chicago Bears players
- List of Florida Gators in the NFL draft
- List of University of Florida alumni
- List of University of Florida Athletic Hall of Fame members
