= 1984 Alabama Crimson Tide football team =

American college football season

1984 Alabama Crimson Tide football
- Conference: Southeastern Conference
- Record: 5–6 (2–4 SEC)
- Head coach: Ray Perkins (2nd season)
- Offensive coordinator: George Henshaw (2nd season)
- Defensive coordinator: Ken Donahue (11th season)
- Captains: Paul Ott Carruth; Emanuel King
- Home stadium: Bryant–Denny Stadium; Legion Field

1984 Southeastern Conference football standings
	Conf.					Overall
Team	W		L		T	W		L		T
No. 3 Florida	5	–	0	–	1	9	–	1	–	1
No. 15 LSU	4	–	1	–	1	8	–	3	–	1
No. 14 Auburn	4	–	2	–	0	9	–	4	–	0
Georgia	4	–	2	–	0	7	–	4	–	1
No. 19 Kentucky	3	–	3	–	0	9	–	3	–	0
Tennessee	3	–	3	–	0	7	–	4	–	1
Vanderbilt	2	–	4	–	0	5	–	6	–	0
Alabama	2	–	4	–	0	5	–	6	–	0
Ole Miss	1	–	5	–	0	4	–	6	–	1
Mississippi State	1	–	5	–	0	4	–	7	–	0
$ – Conference champion; Florida was assessed a postseason ban following an NCAA investigation, and the SEC subsequently vacated any championship. The Sugar Bowl automatic bid for the conference champion was awarded to LSU. Under modern rules, LSU would be credited with the conference championship.; Rankings from AP Poll

The 1984 Alabama Crimson Tide football team (variously "Alabama", "UA", "Bama" or "The Tide") represented the University of Alabama in the 1984 NCAA Division I-A football season. It was the Crimson Tide's 90th overall and 51st season as a member of the Southeastern Conference (SEC). The team was led by head coach Ray Perkins, in his second year, and played its home games at Bryant–Denny Stadium in Tuscaloosa and Legion Field in Birmingham, Alabama. Alabama finished the season with a record of five wins and six losses (5–6 overall, 2–4 in the SEC). This marked Alabama's first losing season since the Tide went 2–7–1 in 1957 under Jennings B. Whitworth, and ended its streak of 25 straight bowl appearances.

Some of the more notable contests of the season included a season-opening loss to Boston College (and their quarterback, Doug Flutie, who went on to win the 1984 Heisman Trophy), a third consecutive loss to Tennessee in which the Tide gave up a 14-point fourth quarter lead, and Alabama's first loss to Vanderbilt since 1969. and last until 2024. However, Alabama did upset Auburn 17–15 in the 1984 edition of the Iron Bowl, denying the Tigers a berth in the Sugar Bowl.

== Schedule ==
Date	Time	Opponent	Rank	Site	TV	Result	Attendance	Source
September 8	7:00 p.m.	No. 18 Boston College*	No. 9	Legion Field; Birmingham, AL	ABC	L 31–38	67,821	
September 15	11:00 a.m.	at Georgia Tech*	No. 19	Grant Field; Atlanta, GA (rivalry)	TBS	L 6–16	56,107	
September 22	1:30 p.m.	Southwestern Louisiana*		Bryant–Denny Stadium; Tuscaloosa, AL		W 37–14	56,431	
September 29	11:00 a.m.	Vanderbilt^{†}		Bryant–Denny Stadium; Tuscaloosa, AL	MTN	L 21–30	60,210	
October 6	2:30 p.m.	No. 20 Georgia		Legion Field; Birmingham, AL (rivalry)	ABC	L 14–24	75,608	
October 13	1:30 p.m.	No. 11 Penn State*		Bryant–Denny Stadium; Tuscaloosa, AL (rivalry)		W 6–0	60,210	
October 20	12:30 p.m.	at Tennessee		Neyland Stadium; Knoxville, TN (Third Saturday in October)		L 27–28	95,422	
November 3	1:30 p.m.	at Mississippi State		Mississippi Veterans Memorial Stadium; Jackson, MS (rivalry)		W 24–20	45,868	
November 10	1:30 p.m.	No. 12 LSU		Legion Field; Birmingham, AL (rivalry)		L 14–16	74,301	
November 17	12:30 p.m.	at Cincinnati*		Riverfront Stadium; Cincinnati, OH		W 29–7	27,482	
December 1	11:30 a.m.	vs. No. 11 Auburn		Legion Field; Birmingham, AL (Iron Bowl)	ABC	W 17–15	76,853	
*Non-conference game; ^{†}Homecoming; Rankings from AP Poll released prior to the game; All times are in Central time
