= 1984 Georgia Bulldogs football team =

American college football season

1984 Georgia Bulldogs football

Florida Citrus Bowl, T 17–17 vs. Florida State
- Conference: Southeastern Conference
- Record: 7–4–1 (4–2 SEC)
- Head coach: Vince Dooley (21st season)
- Offensive coordinator: George Haffner (5th season)
- Defensive coordinator: Bill Lewis (4th season)
- Home stadium: Sanford Stadium

1984 Southeastern Conference football standings
	Conf.					Overall
Team	W		L		T	W		L		T
No. 3 Florida	5	–	0	–	1	9	–	1	–	1
No. 15 LSU	4	–	1	–	1	8	–	3	–	1
No. 14 Auburn	4	–	2	–	0	9	–	4	–	0
Georgia	4	–	2	–	0	7	–	4	–	1
No. 19 Kentucky	3	–	3	–	0	9	–	3	–	0
Tennessee	3	–	3	–	0	7	–	4	–	1
Vanderbilt	2	–	4	–	0	5	–	6	–	0
Alabama	2	–	4	–	0	5	–	6	–	0
Ole Miss	1	–	5	–	0	4	–	6	–	1
Mississippi State	1	–	5	–	0	4	–	7	–	0
$ – Conference champion; Florida was assessed a postseason ban following an NCAA investigation, and the SEC subsequently vacated any championship. The Sugar Bowl automatic bid for the conference champion was awarded to LSU. Under modern rules, LSU would be credited with the conference championship.; Rankings from AP Poll

The 1984 Georgia Bulldogs football team represented the University of Georgia as a member of the Southeastern Conference (SEC) during the 1984 NCAA Division I-A football season. Led by 21st-year head coach Vince Dooley, the Bulldogs compiled an overall record of 7–4–1, with a mark of 4–2 in conference play, and finished tied for third in the SEC.

== Schedule ==
Date	Opponent	Rank	Site	TV	Result	Attendance	Source
September 8	Southern Miss*		Sanford Stadium; Athens, GA		W 26–19	81,427	
September 22	No. 2 Clemson*	No. 20	Sanford Stadium; Athens, GA (rivalry)		W 26–23	82,122	
September 29	at South Carolina*	No. 12	Williams–Brice Stadium; Columbia, SC (rivalry)		L 10–17	74,325	
October 6	at Alabama	No. 20	Legion Field; Birmingham, AL (rivalry)	ABC	W 24–14	75,808	
October 13	Ole Miss	No. 15	Sanford Stadium; Athens, GA	TBS	W 18–12	82,122	
October 20	Vanderbilt	No. 14	Sanford Stadium; Athens, GA (rivalry)	TBS	W 62–35	82,122	
October 27	at Kentucky	No. 13	Commonwealth Stadium; Lexington, KY	TBS	W 37–7	56,032	
November 3	Memphis State*^{†}	No. 8	Sanford Stadium; Athens, GA		W 13–3	82,122	
November 10	vs. No. 10 Florida	No. 8	Gator Bowl Stadium; Jacksonville, FL (rivalry)	TBS	L 0–27	82,349	
November 17	at No. 18 Auburn	No. 15	Jordan-Hare Stadium; Auburn, AL (rivalry)	ESPN	L 12–21	75,300	
December 1	Georgia Tech*	No. 18	Sanford Stadium; Athens, GA (rivalry)		L 18–35	82,122	
December 22	vs. No. 15 Florida State*		Florida Citrus Bowl; Orlando, FL (Florida Citrus Bowl)	NBC	T 17–17	51,821	
*Non-conference game; ^{†}Homecoming; Rankings from AP Poll released prior to the game

== Roster ==
1984 Georgia Bulldogs football team roster
Players
Coaches
Offense

Pos.	#	Name	Class
QB	14	James Jackson	Fr
QB	15	Todd Williams	Jr
TE	30	Scott Williams	Sr
RB	32	Lars Tate	Fr
RB	36	Cleveland Gary	Fr
RB	43	David McCluskey	So

Defense

Pos.	#	Name	Class

Special teams

Pos.	#	Name	Class
K	5	Kevin Butler	Sr

Head coach

- Vince Dooley

Coordinators/assistant coaches

Legend

- (C) Team captain
- (S) Suspended
- (I) Ineligible
- Injured
- Redshirt
