= 1984 Sun Bowl =

American college football game

Maryland Terrapins	Tennessee Volunteers
(8–3)	(7–3–1)
ACC	SEC
28	27
Head coach: Bobby Ross	Head coach: Johnny Majors
AP / Coaches; 12 / 11
	1	2	3	4	Total
Maryland	0	0	22	6	28
Tennessee	10	11	6	0	27
- Date: December 22, 1984
- Season: 1984
- Stadium: Sun Bowl
- Location: El Paso, Texas
- MVP: FB Rick Badanjek (Maryland)
- Referee: Paul Schmitt (SICOA)
- Attendance: 50,126

United States TV coverage
- Network: CBS
- Announcers: Gary Bender; Pat Haden

The 1984 Sun Bowl was a college football postseason bowl game that featured the Tennessee Volunteers and the Maryland Terrapins.

== Background ==
Maryland had won their second straight Atlantic Coast Conference title highlighted by their comeback against Miami in which they went on a 42–9 run in the second half to topple the defending champs in Miami. Tennessee had finished tied for 5th in the Southeastern Conference in their 4th straight bowl appearance. This was Maryland's first Sun Bowl since 1978. This was Tennessee's first ever Sun Bowl, and Majors' third Sun Bowl as coach (1971 with Iowa State and 1975 with Pittsburgh).

== Game summary ==
Tailback Johnnie Jones gave the Vols an early 7–0 lead on his touchdown plunge from 2 yards out. Fuad Reveiz made it 10–0 on his 24-yard field goal to end the quarter. He added another field goal from 52 yards out to make it 13–0. Tony Robinson threw a touchdown pass to Tim McGee from 6 yards out to make it 21–0. Tommy Neal started the comeback for the Terrapins on his 57-yard touchdown run early in the third quarter to make it 21–6. The Terps soon added a field goal to make it 21–9. Rick Badanjek made it 21–16 on his touchdown plunge from a yard out. Ferrell Edmunds caught a 40-yard touchdown pass from Frank Reich to make it 22–21. Pete Panuska gave the Vols the lead on his 100-yard kickoff return with :10 left in the third quarter to make it 27–22, after a missed conversion that would've made it a seven-point lead. With 2:28 to go, Badanjek scored on a touchdown plunge to make it 28–27, after a failed extra point kick. The Vols were driving for the win when Keeta Covington forced the ball loose from Robinson with time expiring, giving Maryland the win. Badanjek ran for two touchdowns, earning MVP honors. Frank Reich went 17-of-28 for 201 yards, with 1 touchdown and interception.

== Aftermath ==
Neither team has played in the Sun Bowl since this game.

== Statistics ==
Statistics	Maryland	Tennessee
First downs	22	13
Rushing yards	229	148
Passing yards	201	132
Total yards	430	280
Interceptions thrown	1	0
Return yards	80	194
Punts–average	4–39.0	5–42.4
Fumbles–lost	2–2	2–2
Penalties–yards	8–63	6–49
