= Fergie Ferguson Award =

- Awarded for: "Senior football player who displays outstanding leadership, character and courage"
- Location: University of Florida, Gainesville, Florida
- Country: United States
- Presented by: Florida Gators football coaching staff
- Website: Florida Gators football

The Forest K. Ferguson Award, commonly known as the "Fergie Ferguson Award," is presented annually to a senior member of the Florida Gators football team in memory of one of the University of Florida's greatest athletes.

== Namesake ==
The award takes its name from Forest K. Ferguson, known as "Fergie" to his teammates, who was one of the University of Florida's greatest all-around athletes. Ferguson received first-team All-Southeastern Conference (SEC) and honorable mention All-American honors as a football player in 1941. He was also the State of Florida collegiate boxing champion, and won the Amateur Athletic Union (AAU) national championship in the javelin throw in 1942. As a second lieutenant in the U.S. Army, Ferguson led an infantry platoon during the D-Day landings in Nazi-occupied France on June 6, 1944. His platoon was pinned down by a machine gun being fired from a nest on a high bluff, so Ferguson climbed the cliff and eliminated the danger but was severely wounded in the process. He was awarded the Distinguished Service Cross, the nation's second highest medal, for "extraordinary heroism" in combat. Ferguson never fully recovered from his wounds, and died from complications related to his war-time injuries in 1954.

== Award ==
The Forest K. Ferguson Award was established in Ferguson's honor by several of his former Gators teammates in 1955. The award is given annually in the form of a trophy, which remains in the permanent possession of the university. The recipient is the Gators' "senior football player who displays outstanding leadership, character and courage," and is selected by the Florida Gators football coaching staff and players. Former Gator and NFL fullback Mal Hammack was the first recipient in 1955. The recipients to date are listed below:

=== Award winners ===
1954 – Malcolm Hammack (FB)
1955 – Steve DeLaTorre (C/LB)
1956 – Larry Wesley (T)
1957 – Jim Rountree (HB)
1958 – Jimmy Dunn (QB)
1959 – Asa Cox (G)
1960 – Pat Patchen (E), Vic Miranda (T)
1961 – Jim Beaver (T)
1962 – Sam Holland (E)
1963 – Jimmy Morgan (LB), Hagood Clarke (HB)
1964 – Larry Dupree (FB)
1965 – Charles Casey (E)
1966 – Steve Spurrier (QB)
1967 – Richard Trapp (E)
1968 – Guy Dennis (G), Larry Smith (RB)
1969 – Steve Tannen (DB)
1970 – Jack Youngblood (DE)
1971 – John Reaves (QB)
1972 – Fred Abbott (LB)
1973 – David Hitchcock (NG)
1974 – Lee McGriff (SE)
1975 – Jimmy DuBose (FB)
1976 – Jimmy Fisher (QB)
1977 – Wes Chandler (SE)
1978 – Mike Dupree (DE)
1979 – Chuck Hatch (DB)
1980 – David Little (LB)
1981 – Brian Clark (PK)
1982 – James Jones (FB)
1983 – Dwayne Dixon (WR)
1984 – Gary Rolle (WR)
1985 – Neal Anderson (RB)
1986 – Ricky Nattiel (WR)
1987 – Kerwin Bell (QB)
1988 – Louis Oliver (DB)
1989 – John Durden (OT)
1990 – Kirk Kirkpatrick (TE)
1991 – Cal Dixon (C)
1992 – Lex Smith (DE)
1993 – William Gaines (DT)
1994 – Michael Gilmore (DB)
1995 – Ben Hanks (LB)
1996 – James Bates (LB)
1997 – Dwayne Thomas (LB)
1998 – Willie Cohens (DE)
1999 – Cheston Blackshear (OG)
2000 – Jesse Palmer (QB)
2001 – Rob Roberts (FB)
2002 – Byron Hardmon (LB)
2003 – Daryl Dixon (FS)
2004 – Ciatrick Fason (RB)
2005 – Jarvis Herring (S)
2006 – Jemalle Cornelius (WR)
2007 – Andre Caldwell (WR)
2008 – Louis Murphy (WR)
2009 – Ryan Stamper (LB)
2010 – Justin Trattou (DE)
2011 – John Brantley (QB), Lerentee McCray (LB)
2012 – Sharrif Floyd (DL), Jon Bostic (LB), Frankie Hammond (WR), Josh Evans (DB)
2013 – Jeremy Brown (DB), Kyle Koehne (OL), Darrin Kitchens (LB)
2014 – Max Garcia (OL)
2015 – Jon Bullard (DL)
2016 – Jarrad Davis (LB)
2017 – Duke Dawson (DB)
2022 – Ventrell Miller (LB)
2023 – Ricky Pearsall (WR)

== See also ==
- List of University of Florida Athletic Hall of Fame members
