= 1984 LSU Tigers football team =

American college football season

1984 LSU Tigers football

Sugar Bowl, L 10–28 vs. Nebraska
- Conference: Southeastern Conference

Ranking
- Coaches: No. 16
- AP: No. 15
- Record: 8–3–1 (4–1–1 SEC)
- Head coach: Bill Arnsparger (1st season)
- Offensive coordinator: Ed Zaunbrecher (1st season)
- Defensive coordinator: John Symank (1st season)
- Home stadium: Tiger Stadium

1984 Southeastern Conference football standings
	Conf.					Overall
Team	W		L		T	W		L		T
No. 3 Florida	5	–	0	–	1	9	–	1	–	1
No. 15 LSU	4	–	1	–	1	8	–	3	–	1
No. 14 Auburn	4	–	2	–	0	9	–	4	–	0
Georgia	4	–	2	–	0	7	–	4	–	1
No. 19 Kentucky	3	–	3	–	0	9	–	3	–	0
Tennessee	3	–	3	–	0	7	–	4	–	1
Vanderbilt	2	–	4	–	0	5	–	6	–	0
Alabama	2	–	4	–	0	5	–	6	–	0
Ole Miss	1	–	5	–	0	4	–	6	–	1
Mississippi State	1	–	5	–	0	4	–	7	–	0
$ – Conference champion; Florida was assessed a postseason ban following an NCAA investigation, and the SEC subsequently vacated any championship. The Sugar Bowl automatic bid for the conference champion was awarded to LSU. Under modern rules, LSU would be credited with the conference championship.; Rankings from AP Poll

The 1984 LSU Tigers football team represented Louisiana State University (LSU) as a member of the Southeastern Conference (SEC) during the 1984 NCAA Division I-A football season. Led by first-year head coach Bill Arnsparger, the Tigers compiled an overall record of 8–3–1, with a mark of 4–1–1 in conference play, and finished second in the SEC.

The Tigers were awarded the SEC's automatic invitation to the Sugar Bowl when conference champion Florida was declared ineligible for the title due to NCAA violations committed by coach Charley Pell, who was fired three games into the season (coincidentally, Pell's penultimate game was a 21-21 tie vs. LSU). Auburn's opportunity to return to the Sugar Bowl was ended by Alabama, which was wrapping up its first losing season since 1957, in the Iron Bowl. It was LSU's first Sugar Bowl appearance since the 1967 season.

LSU lost the Sugar Bowl to Nebraska, the Tigers' second bowl loss to the Cornhuskers in three seasons.

== Schedule ==
Date	Time	Opponent	Rank	Site	TV	Result	Attendance	Source
September 8	2:30 p.m.	at Florida		Florida Field; Gainesville, FL (rivalry)	TBS	T 21–21	70,197	
September 15	7:00 p.m.	Wichita State*		Tiger Stadium; Baton Rouge, LA	TigerVision	W 47–7	78,026	
September 22	7:00 p.m.	Arizona*		Tiger Stadium; Baton Rouge, LA	TigerVision	W 27–26	78,052	
September 29	3:30 p.m.	at No. 15 USC*		Los Angeles Memorial Coliseum; Los Angeles, CA	TigerVision	W 23–3	60,128	
October 13	6:30 p.m.	Vanderbilt^{†}	No. 12	Tiger Stadium; Baton Rouge, LA	ESPN	W 34–27	78,003	
October 20	2:50 p.m.	at 16 Kentucky	No. 10	Commonwealth Stadium; Lexington, KY	ABC	W 36–10	57,252	
October 27	2:50 p.m.	Notre Dame*	No. 7	Tiger Stadium; Baton Rouge, LA	ABC	L 22–30	78,033	
November 3	7:00 p.m.	Ole Miss	No. 15	Tiger Stadium; Baton Rouge, LA (rivalry)	TigerVision	W 32–29	77,649	
November 10	1:30 p.m.	at Alabama	No. 12	Legion Field; Birmingham, AL (rivalry)		W 16–14	74,301	
November 17	1:30 p.m.	at Mississippi State	No. 9	Scott Field; Starkville, MS	TigerVision	L 14–16	30,556	
November 24	7:00 p.m.	Tulane*	No. 16	Tiger Stadium; Baton Rouge, LA (Battle for the Rag)	TigerVision	W 33–15	77,983	
January 1, 1985	7:50 p.m.	vs. 5 Nebraska*	No. 11	Louisiana Superdome; New Orleans, LA (Sugar Bowl)	ABC	L 10–28	75,608	
*Non-conference game; ^{†}Homecoming; Rankings from AP Poll released prior to the game; All times are in Central time

== Rankings ==
Ranking movements Legend: ██ Increase in ranking ██ Decrease in ranking — = Not ranked ( ) = First-place votes
	Week															
Poll	Pre	1	2	3	4	5	6	7	8	9	10	11	12	13	14	Final
AP	—	—	—	—	—	15	12	10	7 (1)	15	12	9	16	14	11	15
Coaches	—	—	—	—	18	13	10	9	6 (1)	17	15	12	18	15	12	16

== Game summaries ==
=== Vs. Nebraska (Sugar Bowl) ===
No. 4 Nebraska vs No. 12 LSU

Team	1	2	3	4	Total
• No. 4 Cornhuskers	0	7	7	14	28
No. 12 Tigers	3	7	0	0	10

- Date: 1985-01-01
- Location: Louisiana Superdome, New Orleans, Louisiana
- Game start: 7:35 p.m. CST
- Game attendance: 75,608
- TV announcers (ABC): Keith Jackson and Frank Broyles

== Roster ==
1984 LSU Tigers football team roster
Players
Coaches
Offense

Pos.	#	Name	Class
QB	5	Jeff Wickersham	Jr
RB	28	Herman Fontenot	Sr
RB	21	Dalton Hilliard	Jr
RB	23	Sammy Martin	Fr
RB	33	Garry James	Jr
TE	49	Brian Kinchen	Fr
C	56	Nacho Albergamo	Fr
OT	63	Curt Gore	Jr
G	66	Keith Melancon	So
OT	75	John Hazard	So
G	76	Eric Andolsek	Fr
WR	80	Rogie Magee	Fr
WR	82	Wendell Davis	Fr
TE	83	Mitch Andrews	Jr

Defense

Pos.	#	Name	Class
DE	77	Roland Barbay	So
ILB	94	Michael Brooks	So
CB	12	Norman Jefferson	So
S	4	Jeff Dale	Sr

Special teams

Pos.	#	Name	Class
P	3	Matt DeFrank	Fr
K	8	Ron Lewis	Fr

Head coach

- Bill Arnsparger

Coordinators/assistant coaches

- Ed Zaunbrecher – Offensive coordinator/quarterbacks
- Jesse Daigle – Running backs
- Jerry Sullivan – Wide receivers
- Terry Lewis – Tight ends
- John Symank – Defensive coordinator
- Pete Mangurian – Offensive line
- Pete Jenkins – Defensive line
- Kurt Schottenheimer – Linebackers
- Mike Archer – Defensive backs

Legend

- (C) Team captain
- (S) Suspended
- (I) Ineligible
- Injured
- Redshirt

Roster
