= 1984 Kentucky Wildcats football team =

American college football season

1984 Kentucky Wildcats football
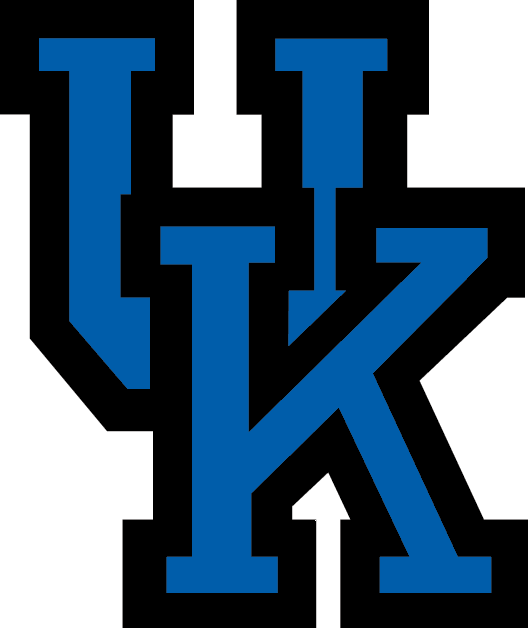

Hall of Fame Classic, W 20–19 vs. Wisconsin
- Conference: Southeastern Conference

Ranking
- Coaches: No. 19
- AP: No. 19
- Record: 9–3 (3–3 SEC)
- Head coach: Jerry Claiborne (4th season)
- Offensive scheme: I formation
- Base defense: Wide-Tackle Six
- Home stadium: Commonwealth Stadium

1984 Southeastern Conference football standings
	Conf.					Overall
Team	W		L		T	W		L		T
No. 3 Florida	5	–	0	–	1	9	–	1	–	1
No. 15 LSU	4	–	1	–	1	8	–	3	–	1
No. 14 Auburn	4	–	2	–	0	9	–	4	–	0
Georgia	4	–	2	–	0	7	–	4	–	1
No. 19 Kentucky	3	–	3	–	0	9	–	3	–	0
Tennessee	3	–	3	–	0	7	–	4	–	1
Vanderbilt	2	–	4	–	0	5	–	6	–	0
Alabama	2	–	4	–	0	5	–	6	–	0
Ole Miss	1	–	5	–	0	4	–	6	–	1
Mississippi State	1	–	5	–	0	4	–	7	–	0
$ – Conference champion; Florida was assessed a postseason ban following an NCAA investigation, and the SEC subsequently vacated any championship. The Sugar Bowl automatic bid for the conference champion was awarded to LSU. Under modern rules, LSU would be credited with the conference championship.; Rankings from AP Poll

The 1984 Kentucky Wildcats football team represented the University of Kentucky in the 1984 NCAA Division I-A football season. The Wildcats scored 293 points while allowing 221 points. Kentucky won the 1984 Hall of Fame Classic Bowl.

Kentucky opened with a 42–0 win over Kent State, followed by a 48–14 win at Indiana. A 30–26 win at Tulane was followed by a 27–14 win over Rutgers, which put Kentucky into the AP poll at #19. The Wildcats then won their conference opener at Mississippi State, 17–13, to improve to 5–0 for the first time since 1950. Kentucky was then ranked #16 in the AP poll.

Kentucky then dropped two conference games against ranked opponents, to #10 LSU 36–10 and to #13 Georgia 37–7. The Wildcats clinched a winning season with a 31–7 win against North Texas and then defeated Vanderbilt 27–18. A 25–17 loss to #5 Florida followed. Kentucky then closed out the regular season with a 17–12 victory at Tennessee.

Kentucky closed its season with a 20–19 victory over #19 Wisconsin in the 1984 Hall of Fame Classic Bowl. As a result, Kentucky finished the season ranked #19 in the final AP poll, with a record of 9–3.

== Schedule ==
Date	Opponent	Rank	Site	TV	Result	Attendance	Source
September 8	Kent State*		Commonwealth Stadium; Lexington, KY		W 42–0	56,402	
September 15	at Indiana*		Memorial Stadium; Bloomington, IN (rivalry)		W 48–14	44,389	
September 22	at Tulane*		Louisiana Superdome; New Orleans, LA		W 30–26	16,505	
October 6	Rutgers*		Commonwealth Stadium; Lexington, KY		W 27–14	58,010	
October 13	Mississippi State	No. 19	Scott Field; Starkville, MS		W 17–13	30,395	
October 20	No. 10 LSU	No. 16	Commonwealth Stadium; Lexington, KY	ABC	L 10–36	57,252	
October 27	No. 13 Georgia		Commonwealth Stadium; Lexington, KY		L 7–37	56,032	
November 3	North Texas State*		Commonwealth Stadium; Lexington, KY		W 31–7	54,328	
November 10	Vanderbilt		Commonwealth Stadium; Lexington, KY (rivalry)		W 27–18	53,112	
November 17	No. 5 Florida		Commonwealth Stadium; Lexington, KY (rivalry)		L 17–25	52,823	
November 24	at Tennessee		Neyland Stadium; Knoxville, TN (rivalry)		W 17–12	93,791	
December 29	vs. No. 19 Wisconsin*		Legion Field; Birmingham, AL (Hall of Fame Classic)		W 20–19	47,300	
*Non-conference game; Rankings from AP Poll released prior to the game

== Roster ==
1984 Kentucky Wildcats football team roster
Players
Coaches
Offense

Pos.	#	Name	Class
[[American football positions|]]
[[American football positions|]]

Defense

Pos.	#	Name	Class
[[American football positions|]]

Special teams

Pos.	#	Name	Class

Head coach

Coordinators/assistant coaches

Legend

- (C) Team captain
- (S) Suspended
- (I) Ineligible
- Injured
- Redshirt

== Team players in the 1985 NFL draft ==
Player	Position	Round	Pick	NFL club
George Adams	Running back	1	19	New York Giants
Cam Jacobs	Linebacker	5	136	Pittsburgh Steelers
Oliver White	Tight end	10	268	Pittsburgh Steelers
Jeff Smith	Defensive tackle	11	291	San Diego Chargers
