= 1984 Vanderbilt Commodores football team =

American college football season

1984 Vanderbilt Commodores football
- Conference: Southeastern Conference
- Record: 5–6 (2–4 SEC)
- Head coach: George MacIntyre (6th season)
- Offensive coordinator: Lynn Amedee (2nd season)
- Defensive coordinator: Kurt Van Valkenburgh (1st season)
- Home stadium: Vanderbilt Stadium

1984 Southeastern Conference football standings
	Conf.					Overall
Team	W		L		T	W		L		T
No. 3 Florida	5	–	0	–	1	9	–	1	–	1
No. 15 LSU	4	–	1	–	1	8	–	3	–	1
No. 14 Auburn	4	–	2	–	0	9	–	4	–	0
Georgia	4	–	2	–	0	7	–	4	–	1
No. 19 Kentucky	3	–	3	–	0	9	–	3	–	0
Tennessee	3	–	3	–	0	7	–	4	–	1
Vanderbilt	2	–	4	–	0	5	–	6	–	0
Alabama	2	–	4	–	0	5	–	6	–	0
Ole Miss	1	–	5	–	0	4	–	6	–	1
Mississippi State	1	–	5	–	0	4	–	7	–	0
$ – Conference champion; Florida was assessed a postseason ban following an NCAA investigation, and the SEC subsequently vacated any championship. The Sugar Bowl automatic bid for the conference champion was awarded to LSU. Under modern rules, LSU would be credited with the conference championship.; Rankings from AP Poll

The 1984 Vanderbilt Commodores football team represented Vanderbilt University as a member of the Southeastern Conference (SEC) during the 1984 NCAA Division I-A football season. Led by sixth-year head coach George MacIntyre, the Commodores compiled an overall record of 5–6 with a mark of 2–4 in conference play, tying for seventh place in the SEC. Vanderbilt played home games at Vanderbilt Stadium in Nashville, Tennessee.

This was the last time Vanderbilt defeated Alabama until 2024.

== Schedule ==
Date	Opponent	Rank	Site	TV	Result	Attendance	Source
September 8	Kansas State*		Vanderbilt Stadium; Nashville, TN		W 26–14	40,786	
September 15	at Maryland*		Byrd Stadium; College Park, MD		W 23–14	34,100	
September 22	Kansas*		Vanderbilt Stadium; Nashville, TN		W 41–6	41,120	
September 29	at Alabama		Bryant–Denny Stadium; Tuscaloosa, AL		W 30–21	60,210	
October 6	Tulane*	No. 19	Vanderbilt Stadium; Nashville, TN		L 23–27	41,216	
October 13	at No. 12 LSU		Tiger Stadium; Baton Rouge, LA	ESPN	L 27–34	78,003	
October 20	at No. 14 Georgia		Sanford Stadium; Athens, GA (rivalry)		L 35–62	82,122	
October 27	Ole Miss		Vanderbilt Stadium; Nashville, TN (rivalry)		W 37–20	41,263	
November 10	at Kentucky		Commonwealth Stadium; Lexington, KY (rivalry)		L 18–27	53,112	
November 17	Virginia Tech*		Vanderbilt Stadium; Nashville, TN		L 3–23	38,238	
December 1	Tennessee		Vanderbilt Stadium; Nashville, TN (rivalry)		L 13–29	41,497	
*Non-conference game; Rankings from AP Poll released prior to the game
