= 1984 Auburn Tigers football team =

American college football season

1984 Auburn Tigers football

Liberty Bowl champion

Liberty Bowl, W 21–15 vs. Arkansas
- Conference: Southeastern Conference

Ranking
- Coaches: No. 14
- AP: No. 14
- Record: 9–4 (4–2 SEC)
- Head coach: Pat Dye (4th season)
- Offensive coordinator: Jack Crowe (3rd season)
- Offensive scheme: Wishbone
- Defensive coordinator: Frank Orgel (4th season)
- Home stadium: Jordan-Hare Stadium

1984 Southeastern Conference football standings
	Conf.					Overall
Team	W		L		T	W		L		T
No. 3 Florida	5	–	0	–	1	9	–	1	–	1
No. 15 LSU	4	–	1	–	1	8	–	3	–	1
No. 14 Auburn	4	–	2	–	0	9	–	4	–	0
Georgia	4	–	2	–	0	7	–	4	–	1
No. 19 Kentucky	3	–	3	–	0	9	–	3	–	0
Tennessee	3	–	3	–	0	7	–	4	–	1
Vanderbilt	2	–	4	–	0	5	–	6	–	0
Alabama	2	–	4	–	0	5	–	6	–	0
Ole Miss	1	–	5	–	0	4	–	6	–	1
Mississippi State	1	–	5	–	0	4	–	7	–	0
$ – Conference champion; Florida was assessed a postseason ban following an NCAA investigation, and the SEC subsequently vacated any championship. The Sugar Bowl automatic bid for the conference champion was awarded to LSU. Under modern rules, LSU would be credited with the conference championship.; Rankings from AP Poll

The 1984 Auburn Tigers football team represented Auburn University in the 1984 NCAA Division I-A football season. Coached by Pat Dye, the team finished the season with an 8–4 record and won the Liberty Bowl over Arkansas. As of 2025, the 1984 team is the only Auburn team to be ranked first in the preseason AP Poll.

== Schedule ==
Date	Opponent	Rank	Site	TV	Result	Attendance	Source
August 27	vs. No. 10 Miami (FL)*	No. 1	Giants Stadium; East Rutherford, NJ (Kickoff Classic)	Katz Sports	L 18–20	51,131	
September 15	at No. 4 Texas*	No. 11	Texas Memorial Stadium; Austin, TX	ESPN	L 27–35	78,348	
September 22	Southern Miss*	No. 19	Jordan-Hare Stadium; Auburn, AL		W 35–12	74,841	
September 29	Tennessee	No. 20	Jordan-Hare Stadium; Auburn, AL (rivalry)	TBS	W 29–10	75,075	
October 6	at Ole Miss	No. 18	Vaught–Hemingway Stadium; Oxford, MS (rivalry)	TBS	W 17–13	35,387	
October 13	at No. 9 Florida State*	No. 16	Doak Campbell Stadium; Tallahassee, FL		W 42–41	58,671	
October 20	Georgia Tech*	No. 13	Jordan-Hare Stadium; Auburn, AL (rivalry)		W 48–34	75,216	
October 27	at Mississippi State	No. 12	Scott Field; Starkville, MS		W 24–21	31,138	
November 3	at No. 13 Florida	No. 11	Florida Field; Gainesville, FL (rivalry)	ABC	L 3–24	74,397	
November 10	Cincinnati*^{†}	No. 20	Jordan-Hare Stadium; Auburn, AL		W 60–0	74,750	
November 17	No. 15 Georgia	No. 18	Jordan-Hare Stadium; Auburn, AL (rivalry)	ESPN	W 21–12	75,300	
December 1	vs. Alabama	No. 11	Legion Field; Birmingham, AL (Iron Bowl)	ABC	L 15–17	76,853	
December 27	vs. Arkansas*	No. 16	Liberty Bowl Memorial Stadium; Memphis, TN (Liberty Bowl)	Katz Sports	W 21–15	50,180	
*Non-conference game; ^{†}Homecoming; Rankings from AP Poll released prior to the game

== Roster ==
1984 Auburn Tigers football team roster
Players
Coaches
Offense

Pos.	#	Name	Class
FB	30	Tommie Agee	Jr
WR	11	Clayton Beauford	Sr
C	53	Yann Cowart	So
RB	21	Ed Graham	Sr
QB	12	Jeff Burger	Fr
RB	22	Brent Fullwood	So
RB	34	Bo Jackson (injured)	Jr
OL	66	Jeff Lott	Jr
QB	17	Mike Mann	Sr
TE	82	Jeff Parks	Jr
OL	69	Rob Shuler	Jr
OL	64	Randy Stokes	Jr
C	55	Ben Tamburello	So
OL	78	Steve Wallace	Jr
QB	10	Pat Washington	Jr

Defense

Pos.	#	Name	Class
FS	31	Vic Beasley	Sr
LB	51	Jim Bone	Sr
LB	54	Gregg Carr	Sr
DE	96	John Dailey	Sr
DE	90	Kevin Greene	Sr
NG	94	Harold Hallman	Jr
CB	27	David King	Sr
SS	9	Tommy Powell	So
DE	95	Gerald Robinson	Jr
CB	32	Jonathan Robinson	Jr
DL	91	Ben Thomas	Jr
CB	45	Jimmie Warren	Jr
DL	98	Gerald Williams	Jr

Special teams

Pos.	#	Name	Class
K	13	Robert McGinty
P	5	Lewis Colbert	Jr

Head coach

- Pat Dye

Coordinators/assistant coaches

Legend

- (C) Team captain
- (S) Suspended
- (I) Ineligible
- Injured
- Redshirt

== Rankings ==
Ranking movements Legend: ██ Increase in ranking ██ Decrease in ranking — = Not ranked ( ) = First-place votes
	Week															
Poll	Pre	1	2	3	4	5	6	7	8	9	10	11	12	13	14	Final
AP	1 (30)	8	11	19	20	18	16	13	12	11	20	18	13	11	16	14
Coaches	1 (32)	6	10	20	19	18	16	13	13	11	—	19	11	11	19	14

== Game summaries ==
=== Vs. Miami (FL) ===
#1 Auburn vs. #10 Miami (FL)

Team	1	2	3	4	Total
Tigers	0	12	3	3	18
• Hurricanes	7	7	0	6	20

- Date: August 27
- Location: Giants Stadium
- Game attendance: 51,131
- TV announcers (KATZ): Curt Gowdy and Len Dawson

Scoring summary
1	10:19	MIA	Shakespeare 17-yard pass from Kosar (Cox kick)	MIA 7–0
2		AUB	Beauford 31-yard pass from Washington (McGinty kick)	Tie 7–7
2	10:22	MIA	Shakespeare 8-yard pass from Kosar (Cox kick)	MIA 14–7
2		AUB	McGinty 42-yard field goal	MIA 14–10
2	0:56	AUB	Safety, Tuten tackled in end zone by Powell	MIA 14–12
3		AUB	McGinty 36-yard field goal	AUB 15–14
4	14:09	MIA	Cox 45-yard field goal	MIA 17–15
4	10:17	AUB	McGinty 45-yard field goal	AUB 18–17
4	6:08	MIA	Cox 25-yard field goal	MIA 20–18

=== At Texas ===
#11 Auburn at #4 Texas

Team	1	2	3	4	Total
Auburn	0	13	6	8	27
• Texas	14	0	7	14	35

- Date: September 15
- Location: Texas Memorial Stadium, Austin, Texas
- Game start: 6:47 pm CDT
- Elapsed time: 3:11
- Game attendance: 78,348
- Game weather: 79 °F (26 °C), high clouds, Wind NE 20–25 mph (32–40 km/h)
- TV announcers (ESPN): Paul Maguire (analyst)
- Source: Box score

Scoring summary
1	5:15	TEX	Dodge 10-yard run (Ward kick)	TEX 7-0
1	0:50	TEX	Orr 1-yard run (Ward kick)	TEX 14-0
2	11:05	AUB	Collins 2-yard run (McGinty kick)	TEX 14-7
2	3:33	AUB	McGinty 22-yard field goal	TEX 14-10
2	0:00	AUB	McGinty 40-yard field goal	TEX 14-13
3	9:19	TEX	Duhon 32-yard pass from Dodge (Ward kick)	TEX 21-13
3	4:23	AUB	Bo Jackson 5-yard run (run failed)	TEX 21-19
4	9:19	TEX	Jerome Johnson 10-yard run (Ward kick)	TEX 28-19
4	4:50	TEX	Jerome Johnson 14-yard run (Ward kick)	TEX 35-19
4	2:33	AUB	Fullwood 1-yard run (Washington run)	TEX 35-27

=== At Florida State ===
#16 Auburn at #9 Florida State

Team	1	2	3	4	Total
• Auburn	10	12	7	13	42
Florida State	3	14	15	9	41

- Date: October 13
- Location: Doak Campbell Stadium, Tallahassee, Florida
- Game attendance: 58,671
