= Kerwin Bell =

American football player and coach (born 1965)

Western Carolina Catamounts
- Title: Head coach

Personal information
- Born: June 15, 1965 (age 61); Live Oak, Florida, U.S.
- Listed height: 6 ft 3 in (1.91 m)
- Listed weight: 207 lb (94 kg)

Career information
- Position: Quarterback (No. 12)
- High school: Lafayette County (FL)
- College: Florida
- NFL draft: 1988: 7th round, 180th overall pick

Career history

Playing
- Miami Dolphins (1988)*; Atlanta Falcons (1988)*; Tampa Bay Buccaneers (1989); Orlando Thunder (1991–1992); New York Jets (1992)*; Sacramento Gold Miners (1993–1994); Edmonton Eskimos (1995); Indianapolis Colts (1996–1997); Toronto Argonauts (1998); Winnipeg Blue Bombers (1999–2000); Toronto Argonauts (2000–2001)
- * Offseason or practice squad member only

Coaching
- Florida (1990) Graduate assistant; Toronto Argonauts (2000–2001) Offensive coordinator; Trinity Catholic High School (FL) (2002–2006) Head coach; Jacksonville (2007–2015) Head coach; Valdosta State (2016–2018) Head coach; South Florida (2019) Offensive coordinator; Western Carolina (2021–present) Head coach

Awards and highlights
- As player: SEC Player of the Year (1984); 2× Second-team All-SEC (1984, 1986); University of Florida Athletic Hall of Fame; Florida–Georgia Hall of Fame; CFL East All Star (1998); As coach: NCAA Division II national champion (2018); PFL Coach of The Year (2008); GSC Co-Coach of The Year (2018)

Career CFL statistics
- Pass attempts: 2,588
- Completions: 1,560
- Percent complete: 61.0%
- Passing yards: 19,538
- TD–INT: 101–80
- Stats at Pro Football Reference

Head coaching record
- Career: 124–68 (.646)

Kerwin Douglas Bell (born June 15, 1965) is an American football coach and former player who has been the head coach of the Western Carolina Catamounts football team since 2021. He played professionally as a quarterback for 14 seasons in the Canadian Football League (CFL), World League of American Football (WLAF), and the National Football League (NFL) from the late 1980s until 2002. He then went into coaching, first at the high school level before moving to the collegiate ranks in 2007.

Bell was born in the rural North Central Florida town of Live Oak and was a star high school football quarterback at Lafayette County High School. Though he led the Lafayette Hornets to their only state championship, he did not attract the attention of top college football programs while playing at the small high school. He enrolled at the University of Florida, made their Florida Gators team as a walk-on, and was redshirted during his freshman season of 1983.

Injuries to more experienced players just before the 1984 season pushed Bell into a starting role for the Gators' season opening game against the defending national champion Miami Hurricanes in what was one of the first prime time college football broadcasts on ESPN. He played well in his first collegiate appearance, throwing a go-ahead touchdown pass with under a minute remaining. Though Miami responded and scored the winning touchdown with seven seconds left, Bell's performance under difficult circumstances cemented his position as the team's starting quarterback. Even as head coach Charley Pell was fired mid-season due to NCAA rules violations, Bell and interim coach Galen Hall led the Gators to a conference-best 9–1–1 record, and he was named the Southeastern Conference (SEC) player of the year. Bell played at Florida for four seasons and was named to several more All-SEC and All-American lists, before graduating in 1987.

Though he started dozens of games in the WLAF and the CFL, he never started an NFL contest and threw only five regular season passes in his NFL career. However, he completed all five of those passes for 75 yards and a touchdown, leaving him with the highest career passer rating in league history, albeit in a very small sample size.

After retiring as a player, Bell returned to Florida and became a high school football coach, leading Trinity High School in Ocala to their first state football championship in 2005. He became the head coach at NCAA Division I (FCS) Jacksonville University in 2007 and led the Dolphins to their first three conference championships during his nine seasons at the school. Bell moved to Valdosta State University in 2016, and in 2018, he led the Blazers to their first undefeated season and the NCAA D-II national championship on the strength of the highest scoring offense in college football. Bell accepted the position of offensive coordinator for the South Florida Bulls under head coach Charlie Strong in 2019 but was dismissed along with the entire staff when Strong was fired after the season.

Bell became the head football coach at Western Carolina in 2021. The Catamounts had not won more than three games for several seasons until Bell led them to their first winning record in six years in 2022.

== Early life ==
Bell was born in Live Oak, Florida in North Central Florida to Doyle and Zelda Bell and grew up in nearby Mayo, Florida, population 800. His parents were tobacco farmers, and Kerwin helped with various farming tasks throughout his youth. Bell attended Lafayette County High School, where he was the president of the student council and a multi-sport athlete, playing shortstop on the baseball team, leading the basketball team in scoring as a starting guard, and starting at quarterback on the football team. In 1981, he led the Lafayette Hornets to their only state football championship, earning the nickname "The Throwin' Mayoan."

== College career ==
Despite his prep success, Bell was lightly recruited during his senior year with no athletic scholarship offers from major football programs, as his rural high school had competed in the lowest division of Florida high school football and coaches were unsure if he could succeed against top collegiate talent. Instead of attending a smaller college, Bell decided to walk-on at the University of Florida in nearby Gainesville and join the Florida Gators football team without an athletic scholarship. He was eighth on the Gators' quarterback depth chart during his freshman season of 1983 under head coach Galen Hall and was redshirted without playing in a game.

Bell was the Gators' backup quarterback coming into the 1984 season due to his consistent performance on the practice field and the fact that several quarterbacks ahead of him on the depth chart had graduated, transferred, or were injured. When senior starter Dale Dorminey suffered a serious knee injury four days before the Gators' first game, Bell was suddenly thrust into the starting role. The Gators opened the 1984 season against the defending national champion Miami Hurricanes in Tampa Stadium in one of the first college football games to be nationally televised by ESPN. In his first collegiate start, Bell threw a touchdown pass with under a minute remaining to give the Gators the lead, only to have Miami quarterback Bernie Kosar lead the Hurricanes to a winning score with seven seconds remaining.

The Gators won the remaining games of the season especially during Bell's redshirt freshman year. Behind the offensive line, memorably dubbed "The Great Wall of Florida," and which included Phil Bromley, Lomas Brown, Billy Hinson, Crawford Ker and Jeff Zimmerman, and supported by fullback John L. Williams, halfback Neal Anderson and wide receiver Ricky Nattiel, Bell led the Gators to a 9–1–1 record, an SEC championship, and a top-5 national ranking.

However, due to NCAA infractions committed under coach Charley Pell, the Gators' were ineligible for bowl consideration, and their SEC championship was vacated months after the 1984 season ended. In 1985, now with a full scholarship, Bell led the Gators to a second consecutive 9–1–1 record. Though ineligible for the conference championship, the Gators finished with best-in-the-conference records of 5–0–1 and 5–1 in 1984 and 1985 and briefly held their first ever No. 1 ranking in the AP poll during the 1985 season.

Due to the effects of ongoing NCAA penalties, the Gators' record slipped to 6–5 in 1986 and 6–6 in 1987, Bell's junior and senior seasons. A highlight of those campaigns was Florida's upset of the No. 5 and undefeated Auburn Tigers in November 1986. Bell had injured his knee a month prior and did not start the game. But with the Gators trailing 17–0 in the fourth quarter, he entered the contest wearing a large knee brace and led his team to a dramatic 18–17 comeback win, capped with a last-minute touchdown pass to Nattiel followed by Bell himself "hobbling" into the endzone for a successful two-point conversion.

Bell was the Southeastern Conference (SEC) Player of the Year in 1984, an honorable mention All-American in 1985 and 1986, a first-team All-SEC selection in 1985, and the recipient of the Gators' Fergie Ferguson Award and a team captain in 1987. He finished his four-year college career with 549 completions on 949 passing attempts, for 7,585 yards and fifty-six touchdowns.

Bell graduated from Florida with a bachelor's degree in psychology in 1987, and was inducted into the University of Florida Athletic Hall of Fame as a "Gator Great" in 1997. Among the top 100 Gators of the first 100 years of Florida football, the sportswriters of The Gainesville Sun ranked him the No. 26 greatest Gator of all time in 2006.

== Professional career ==
=== Miami Dolphins ===
Bell was drafted by the Miami Dolphins in the seventh round (180th pick overall) of the 1988 NFL draft. He played in two preseason games, completing 8 of 15 passes for 64 yards, but was beaten out by David Archer for the third-string quarterback job.

=== Atlanta Falcons ===
Bell was picked up on waivers by the Atlanta Falcons, but did not play in their final preseason game, and was cut prior to the 1988 NFL season. The Falcons later resigned him and he spent the rest of the season on the practice squad.

=== Tampa Bay Buccaneers ===
Although there was interest from the Green Bay Packers (then coached by former Florida running back Lindy Infante), Bell turned them down to return to his home state and join the Tampa Bay Buccaneers. Bell spent part of 1989 as the Buccaneers' third-string quarterback, but a serious knee injury ended his season and prevented him from playing at all in 1990.

=== Orlando Thunder ===
In 1991, Bell got a chance to start with the Orlando Thunder of the World League of American Football. On March 25, 1991, he wore a helmet cam during the team's season opener against the San Antonio Riders on USA Network. He threw for 2,214 yards overall in 1991. Bell was the Thunder's backup quarterback in 1992 when the team went to the World Bowl.

=== Sacramento Gold Miners ===
Bell began a seven-year Canadian Football League career in 1993, with the Sacramento Gold Miners, part of the failed CFL expansion into the United States. As a back-up quarterback to David Archer in 1993, Bell threw for 296 yards, but his passing production increased to 1,812 yards in 1994.

=== Edmonton Eskimos ===
Bell started 12 regular season games and two playoff games for the Edmonton Eskimos in 1995.

=== Indianapolis Colts ===
Ahead of the 1996 NFL season, Lindy Infante was appointed head coach of the Indianapolis Colts, and he contacted Bell about joining the team as back up to Jim Harbaugh. Bell accepted, and went 10 of 18 for 80 yards and a touchdown during the preseason, but another knee injury ruled him out for six weeks and his place was taken by Paul Justin. He remained on the roster as the third-string quarterback, and with both Harbaugh and Justin out injured, on December 5, 1996, he entered the game against the Philadelphia Eagles. Bell attempted five passes and completed all of them, throwing for 75 yards and a touchdown on the day. He never again threw a pass in a regular season NFL game, leaving him with the highest career passer rating of any quarterback in NFL history. He was the Colts' third-string quarterback in 1997, but did not play in a regular season game.

=== Toronto Argonauts ===
Bell returned to the CFL in 1998 with the Toronto Argonauts and had his best professional year. He threw for 4,991 yards and 27 touchdowns and set a lead record with a completion percentage of 67.3%, earning him a spot on the CFL All-Star team.

=== Winnipeg Blue Bombers ===
Bell signed with the Winnipeg Blue Bombers and again passed for over 4,000 yards in 1999.

=== Toronto Argonauts (second stint) ===
Bell was injured early in 2000 and was traded back to Toronto, where he remained until retiring after the 2001 season. Bell played for the Argonauts more than any other team in his career, passing for 8,811 career yards in forty-six regular season games with Toronto. Overall, Bell played in 126 regular season CFL games, completed 1,560 passes in 2,558 attempts, and threw 101 touchdowns.

== Coaching career ==
=== University of Florida ===
Bell first coached in 1990, when his playing career was temporarily interrupted by a serious knee injury. Bell returned to the University of Florida while rehabilitating to serve as a graduate assistant coach under Steve Spurrier, who was in his first season as the Gators' head ball coach. Bell remained in Gainesville for only one season, as he resumed his playing career in the summer of 1991 with the Orlando Thunder of the WLAF. However, working under Spurrier and watching the "Fun 'n' Gun" offense in games and in practice would have a strong influence on Bell's future offensive philosophies. "The spacing and just the concepts of the routes and the rhythm of the system. That's almost perfection and that's what I try to obtain every day in practice," he said in 2019.

=== Toronto Argonauts ===
Bell next coached in 2001, when he served as the co-offensive coordinator for the Toronto Argonauts during his last season as an active player.

=== Trinity High School ===
After retiring as a player, Bell returned to his home state to become the first head football coach at brand-new Trinity Catholic High School in Ocala, Florida, which fielded its first varsity team in 2002. The program grew quickly under Bell, with the Celtics making the district playoffs in their second season. In 2005, Trinity went 14–0 and won the Florida 2A state high school football championship on the strength of a prolific passing attack that produced 41 touchdown passes against 5 interceptions. Trinity went undefeated for a second consecutive regular season in 2006 and lost in the state championship game, ending a 27-game winning streak.

=== Jacksonville University ===
In 2007, Bell became the head coach of the Jacksonville Dolphins, a non-scholarship NCAA Division I Football Championship Subdivision (FCS) football program representing Jacksonville University, a private institution in Jacksonville, Florida. In Bell's second season, the JU Dolphins went 9–4 and won the Pioneer Football League (PFL) championship, and Bell was recognized as the PFL Coach of the Year and was a finalist for the Eddie Robinson Award. The Dolphins won another PFL championship in 2010 with a 10–1 record.

During his tenure at Jacksonville, Bell was rumored to be a candidate for coaching positions at major college programs and confirmed a 2011 interview for the offensive coordinator position with the Florida Gators. Regarding other job options, Bell stated that he intended to build a "strong legacy" at Jacksonville University and would only leave for "the right situation".

Despite compiling a 66–35 record and winning three PFL championships at a school that had only posted one winning season before his arrival, Bell's contract was not renewed after the 2015 season. The school's administration announced that the decision was due to "philosophical differences" stemming from the fact that the school wanted to keep the non-scholarship football program as-is while Bell had publicly advocated for growing the program into an FCS power by offering scholarships. After continuing on a non-scholarship basis for four seasons after Bell's departure, JU decided to discontinue its football program altogether in 2019.

=== Valdosta State ===
In January 2016, Bell was named the new head coach of the Blazers of Valdosta State University, a scholarship football program that competes in NCAA Division II.

In 2018, Bell led the Blazers to the program's first undefeated season (14–0) and the Division II National Championship. The Blazers led D-II in scoring with 52 points per game and scored the most points in Gulf South Conference history.

=== USF ===
In January 2019, Bell was named the offensive coordinator for the South Florida Bulls by head coach Charlie Strong, who knew Bell from several stints as an assistant coach at the University of Florida. Bell was given "total control" of the Bulls' offense, which had stagnated before his arrival.

However, USF suffered through a disappointing 4–8 2019 season in which they lost five of their last six games, leading to Strong's dismissal. Incoming head coach Jeff Scott opted to build a new staff, and Bell was dismissed along with the rest of Strong's assistant coaches on December 16.

=== Western Carolina ===
Bell was hired as the 14th head coach at Western Carolina on April 27, 2021. In Bell's first season, the Catamounts lost their first six games but won four out of the remaining five to finish the season with the program's best win total in five years. In 2022, the Catamounts enjoyed their first winning season since 2017 with a 6–5 campaign, and in 2023, they finished 7–4 and were ranked No. 23 in the final STATS poll for third time in program history and the first since 1983.

== Personal life ==
Kerwin Bell married the former Cosette Odom in 1986, while they were both students at the University of Florida. The two had first met in kindergarten in their hometown of Mayo, and at the time of their marriage, Cosette was Florida's majorette captain while Kerwin was the Gators' star quarterback. Their son, Kade, joined his father's coaching staff at Valdosta State and was the primary playcaller during their national championship season in 2018. Kade later joined his father's staff at USF and Western Carolina before he was named the offensive coordinator at Pittsburgh on December 10, 2023.

== Head coaching record ==
=== College ===
Year	Team	Overall	Conference	Standing	Bowl/playoffs	AFCA^{#}
Jacksonville Dolphins (Pioneer Football League) (2007–2015)
2007	Jacksonville	3–8	2–5	T–6th		
2008	Jacksonville	9–4	7–1	1st	L Gridiron Classic	
2009	Jacksonville	7–4	6–2	T–3rd		
2010	Jacksonville	10–1	8–0	T–1st		
2011	Jacksonville	7–4	6–2	3rd		
2012	Jacksonville	7–4	5–3	T–4th		
2013	Jacksonville	5–6	4–4	6th		
2014	Jacksonville	9–2	7–1*	T–1st*		
2015	Jacksonville	9–2	6–2*	T–3rd*		
Jacksonville:		66–35	52–19	*Official record was 0–0 due to rules violations		
Valdosta State Blazers (Gulf South Conference) (2016–2018)
2016	Valdosta State	8–3	6–2	T–2nd	L NCAA Division II First Round	18
2017	Valdosta State	5–4	5–3	T–2nd		
2018	Valdosta State	14–0	8–0	1st	W NCAA Division II Championship	1
Valdosta State:		27–7	19–5			
Western Carolina Catamounts (Southern Conference) (2021–present)
2021	Western Carolina	4–7	4–4	T–4th		
2022	Western Carolina	6–5	4–4	5th		
2023	Western Carolina	7–4	5–3	4th		
2024	Western Carolina	7–5	6–2	2nd		
2025	Western Carolina	7–5	6–2	2nd		
Western Carolina:		31–26	25–15			
Total:		124–68				
National championship Conference title Conference division title or championship game berth

== See also ==
- List of Florida Gators in the NFL draft
- List of SEC Most Valuable Players
- List of University of Florida alumni
- List of University of Florida Athletic Hall of Fame members
