= Joe Cofer =

American football player (born 1963)

No. 36
- Position: Safety

Personal information
- Born: March 5, 1963 (age 63); Knoxville, Tennessee, U.S.
- Listed height: 6 ft 5 in (1.96 m)
- Listed weight: 260 lb (118 kg)

Career information
- High school: Rule
- College: Tennessee
- NFL draft: 1985: undrafted

Career history
- Washington Redskins (1987)

Career NFL statistics
- Games played: 3
- Games started: 1
- Stats at Pro Football Reference

Joseph Louis Cofer (born March 5, 1963) is an American former professional football player who was a defensive back for the Washington Commanders of the National Football League (NFL) in 1987. He played college football for the Tennessee Volunteers.

His breakup of a Danny White pass sealed a victory that moved the Washington Commanders into first place in the division. In 2018, Cofer was awarded a Super Bowl ring for playing for the Redskins in 1987, the year they won Super Bowl XXII.
