= 1985 Sugar Bowl =

- 51st Sugar Bowl
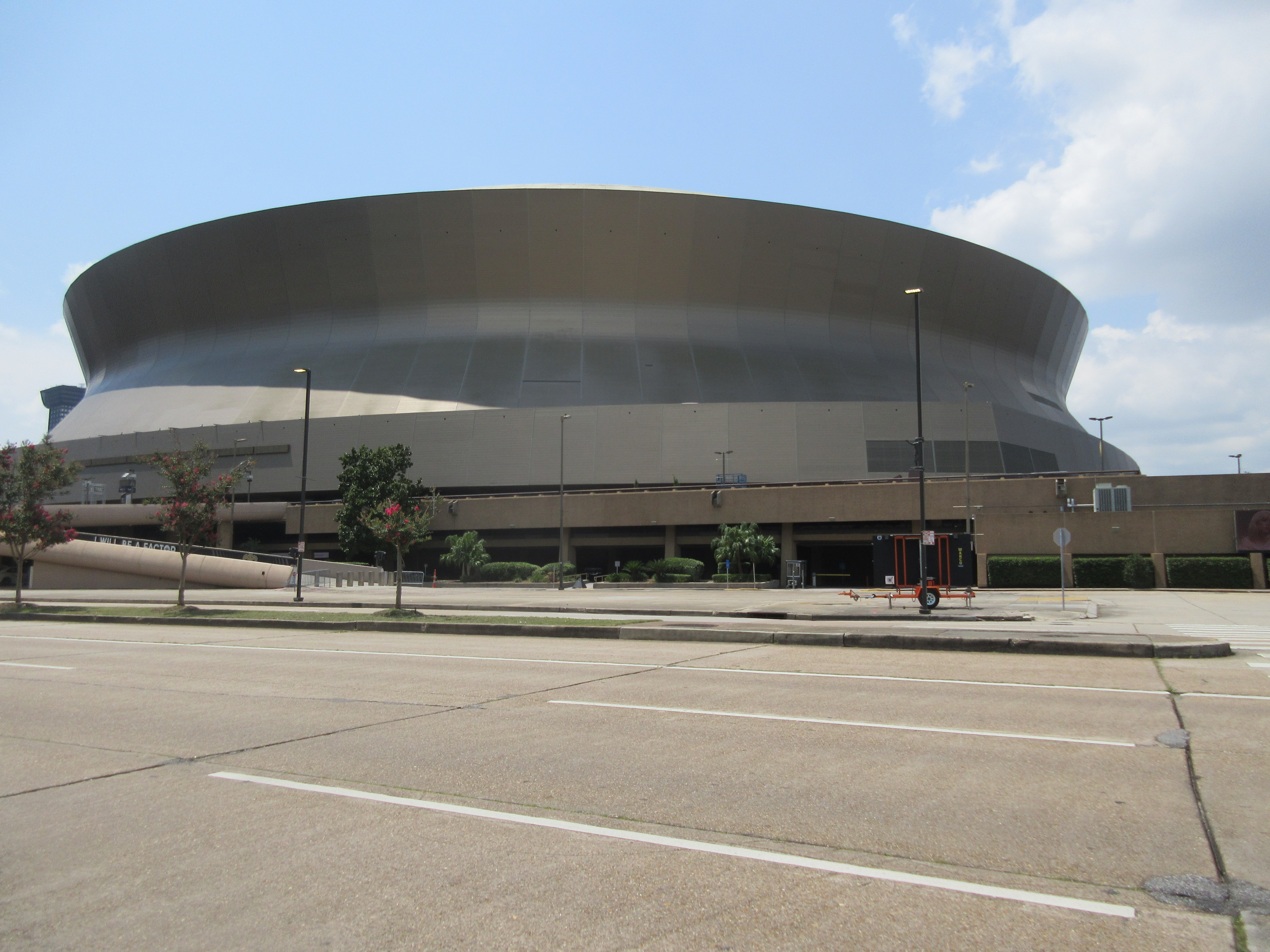
- The Louisiana Superdome in New Orleans, Louisiana, hosted the Sugar Bowl.
Nebraska Cornhuskers	LSU Tigers
(9–2)	(8–2–1)
Big 8	SEC
28	10
Head coach: Tom Osborne	Head coach: Bill Arnsparger
AP / Coaches; 5 / 4	AP / Coaches; 11 / 12
	1	2	3	4	Total
Nebraska	0	7	7	14	28
LSU	3	7	0	0	10
- Date: January 1, 1985
- Season: 1984
- Stadium: Louisiana Superdome
- Location: New Orleans, Louisiana
- MVP: Craig Sundberg (Nebraska QB)
- Favorite: Nebraska by 7½ points
- Referee: Dixon Holman (SWC)
- Attendance: 75,608

United States TV coverage
- Network: ABC
- Announcers: Keith Jackson, Frank Broyles, and Tim Brant

The 1985 Sugar Bowl was the 51st edition of the college football bowl game, played at the Louisiana Superdome in New Orleans, Louisiana, on Tuesday, January 1. Part of the 1984–85 bowl game season, it matched the fifth-ranked Nebraska Cornhuskers of the Big Eight Conference and the #11 LSU Tigers of the Southeastern Conference (SEC). The teams had met two years earlier in the Orange Bowl. Favored Nebraska trailed early, but rallied to win 28–10.

== Game summary ==
The game kicked off shortly after 7 p.m. CST, televised by ABC, at the same time as the Orange Bowl on NBC, which matched #2 Oklahoma and #4 Washington.

In the first quarter, Ronnie Lewis kicked a 37-yard field goal to give LSU an early lead. In the second quarter, Tiger running back Dalton Hilliard scored on a two-yard touchdown run and LSU led 10–0. Nebraska quarterback Craig Sundberg threw a 31-yard touchdown pass to I-back Doug DuBose as Nebraska closed the gap to 10–7 at the half.

In the third quarter, Sundberg scored on a nine-yard run to give the Huskers a 14–10 lead. In the fourth quarter, Sundberg threw touchdown passes of 24 and 17 yards to tight end Todd Frain as Nebraska won 28–10. For his four touchdowns (three passing, one rushing) Sundberg was named the game' MVP.

=== Scoring ===
First quarter

- LSU – Ronnie Lewis 37-yard field goal

Second quarter

- LSU – Dalton Hilliard 2-yard run (Lewis kick)
- Nebraska – Doug DuBose 31-yard pass from Craig Sundberg (Dale Klein kick)

Third quarter

- Nebraska – Sundberg 9-yard run (Klein kick)

Fourth quarter

- Nebraska – Todd Frain 24-yard pass from Sundberg (Klein kick)
- Nebraska – Frain 17-yard pass from Sundberg (Klein kick)

== Statistics ==
Statistics	Nebraska	LSU
First downs	23	19
Rushes–yards	59–280	34–183
Passing yards	143	221
Passing (C–A–I)	10–18–3	20–38–5
Total offense	77–423	72–404
Return yards	16	15
Punts–average	5–31	4–40
Fumbles–lost	0–0	3–1
Turnovers	3	6
Penalties–yards	9–74	5–36
Time of possession	32:29	27:31

== Aftermath ==
Nebraska climbed one spot to fourth in the final AP poll, and LSU fell to fifteenth.

The Cornhuskers and Tigers met in the Sugar Bowl two years later, with Nebraska winning 30-15.
