= Ricky Nattiel =

American football player (born 1966)

No. 84, 81
- Position: Wide receiver

Personal information
- Born: January 25, 1966 (age 60); Gainesville, Florida, U.S.
- Listed height: 5 ft 9 in (1.75 m)
- Listed weight: 180 lb (82 kg)

Career information
- High school: Newberry (Newberry, Florida)
- College: Florida
- NFL draft: 1987: 1st round, 27th overall pick

Career history
- Denver Broncos (1987–1991); Tampa Bay Buccaneers (1992)*; Denver Broncos (1992)
- * Offseason or practice squad member only

Awards and highlights
- PFWA All-Rookie Team (1987); Second-team All-American (1986); First-team All-SEC (1986); Florida–Georgia Hall of Fame; University of Florida Athletic Hall of Fame

Career NFL statistics
- Receptions: 121
- Receiving yards: 1,972
- Receiving touchdowns: 8
- Stats at Pro Football Reference

Ricky Rennard Nattiel (/nɑːˈtiːl/ nah-TEEL; born January 25, 1966), nicknamed "Ricky the Rocket", is an American former professional football player who was a wide receiver for six seasons with the Denver Broncos in the National Football League (NFL) during the 1980s and 1990s. Nattiel played college football for the Florida Gators before playing professionally for the Broncos.

== Early life ==
Nattiel was born in Gainesville, Florida in 1966. He attended Newberry High School in nearby Newberry, Florida, where he was the quarterback for the Newberry Panthers high school football team. During his senior season in 1982, Nattiel led his Panthers to a 9–1 regular season and two state playoff victories, before the Panthers lost in the Florida Class 2A state semifinal game. Nattiel also played basketball and ran track for the Panthers, and was recognized as an all-county athlete in both.

== College career ==
Nattiel accepted an athletic scholarship to attend the University of Florida in Gainesville, where he was a wide receiver for coach Charley Pell and coach Galen Hall's Florida Gators football teams from 1983 to 1986. Notwithstanding his high school background as a quarterback, he was recruited as a defensive back and possibly as a wide receiver, but necessity his freshman year in 1983 forced the coaches' choice. When senior Gators receiver Dwayne Dixon was hobbled halfway through the season, Nattiel started in his place and established his own reputation as a future star receiver to be watched. Nattiel was a key target of Gators quarterback Kerwin Bell during the 1984 and 1985 seasons, when the Gators posted identical 9–1–1 overall win–loss records and led the Southeastern Conference (SEC) with best-in-the-conference records of 5–0–1 and 5–1. Memorably, he dashed ninety-six yards on a touchdown pass from Bell in the Gators' 27–0 victory over the rival Georgia Bulldogs in 1984, contributing to his nickname, "Ricky the Rocket." Nattiel finished his college career with 117 receptions for 2,086 yards and eighteen touchdowns; he also had 589 yards in punt returns. He was a team captain, a first-team All-SEC selection and a second-team All-American in 1986, and received the Gators' Fergie Ferguson Award as the senior who most displayed "outstanding leadership, courage and character."

Nattiel was recognized by the SEC Academic Honor Roll in 1984 and 1986. He graduated from the University of Florida with a bachelor's degree in public health in 1987, and he was inducted into the University of Florida Athletic Hall of Fame as a "Gator Great" in 1998. In one of a series of articles written for The Gainesville Sun in 2006, the Sun sports editors recognized him as the No. 46 all-time greatest Gator of the first 100 years of Florida football.

== Professional career ==
Pre-draft measurables
| Height | Weight | 40-yard dash | 10-yard split | 20-yard split | Vertical jump | Broad jump |
|---|---|---|---|---|---|---|
| 5 ft 8 7/8 in (1.75 m) | 178 lb (81 kg) | 4.41 s | 1.54 s | 2.57 s | 32.0 in (0.81 m) | 9 ft 8 in (2.95 m) |
All values from NFL Combine

The Denver Broncos chose Nattiel in the first round (27th overall pick) of the 1987 NFL draft. He played for the Broncos in six NFL seasons from 1987 to 1992, including eight playoff games and two Super Bowls. His rookie season, he had 31 receptions for 630 yards, setting a franchise rookie record of 20.3 yards per catch. His second year, he upped his receptions to 46, and was the Broncos primary punt returner for 972 all purpose yards. His numbers decreased after that. One of the highlights of his professional career was catching a 56-yard touchdown pass from quarterback John Elway against the Washington Redskins on the Broncos' first play from scrimmage in Super Bowl XXII. Nattiel and fellow Broncos wide receivers Vance Johnson and Mark Jackson all played together from 1987 to 1992 and were nicknamed "The Three Amigos." He finished his six-year NFL career with 121 receptions for 1,972 yards and eight touchdowns.

== NFL career statistics ==
Legend
| **Bold** | Career high |

=== Regular season ===
| Year | Team | Games | | Receiving | | | | |
| Year | Team | GP | GS | Rec | Yds | Avg | Lng | TD |
|---|---|---|---|---|---|---|---|---|
| 1987 | DEN | 12 | 3 | 31 | **630** | **20.3** | 54 | **2** |
| 1988 | DEN | 15 | **11** | **46** | 574 | 12.5 | **74** | 1 |
| 1989 | DEN | 8 | 0 | 10 | 183 | 18.3 | 43 | 1 |
| 1990 | DEN | 15 | 3 | 18 | 297 | 16.5 | 52 | **2** |
| 1991 | DEN | **16** | 0 | 16 | 288 | 18.0 | 70 | **2** |
| 1992 | DEN | 4 | 0 | 0 | 0 | 0.0 | 0 | 0 |
| | | 70 | 17 | 121 | 1,972 | 16.3 | 74 | 8 |

=== Playoffs ===
| Year | Team | Games | | Receiving | | | | |
| Year | Team | GP | GS | Rec | Yds | Avg | Lng | TD |
|---|---|---|---|---|---|---|---|---|
| 1987 | DEN | **3** | **2** | **8** | **171** | 21.4 | **56** | **2** |
| 1989 | DEN | **3** | 0 | 2 | 43 | **21.5** | 28 | 0 |
| 1991 | DEN | 2 | 0 | 3 | 37 | 12.3 | 23 | 0 |
| | | 8 | 2 | 13 | 251 | 19.3 | 56 | 2 |

== Life after the NFL ==
Nattiel, who is Baptist, was formerly the junior varsity coach and wide receivers coach of the Trinity Catholic High School Celtics football team in Ocala, Florida. When former Celtics head coach Kerwin Bell resigned in 2007, Nattiel became the head coach of the Celtics for a single season, leading them to a 7–5 record and a berth in the Florida State 2B regional playoffs.

== See also ==
- List of NCAA major college yearly punt and kickoff return leaders
- List of Denver Broncos first-round draft picks
- List of Florida Gators in the NFL draft
- List of University of Florida Athletic Hall of Fame members
