= 1984 NCAA Division I-A football rankings =

- Season: 1984
- Bowl season: 1984–85 bowl games
- Preseason No. 1: Auburn
- End of season champions: BYU
- Conference with most teams in final AP poll: SEC (4)

Two major human polls as well as five other human polls comprised the 1984 National Collegiate Athletic Association (NCAA) Division I-A football rankings. Unlike most sports, college football's governing body, the NCAA, does not bestow a national championship; instead that title is bestowed by one or more different polling agencies. There are two main weekly polls that begin in the preseason—the AP Poll and the Coaches Poll.

== Legend ==
	Increase in ranking
	Decrease in ranking
	Not ranked previous week
	National champion
(#–#)	Win–loss record
(Italics)	Number of first place votes
т	Tied with team above or below also with this symbol

== AP Poll ==
	Preseason Aug	Week 1 Sep 4	Week 2 Sep 11	Week 3 Sep 18	Week 4 Sep 25	Week 5 Oct 2	Week 6 Oct 9	Week 7 Oct 16	Week 8 Oct 23	Week 9 Oct 30	Week 10 Nov 6	Week 11 Nov 13	Week 12 Nov 20	Week 13 Nov 27	Week 14 Dec 4	Week 15 (Final) Jan 2	
1.	Auburn (30)	Miami (FL) (2–0) (36)	Nebraska (1–0) (35)	Nebraska (2–0) (37)	Nebraska (3–0) (52)	Texas (2–0) (51)	Texas (3–0) (55)	Washington (6–0) (37)	Washington (7–0) (45)	Washington (8–0) (50)	Washington (9–0)	Nebraska (9–1) (37)	BYU (11–0) (40)	BYU (12–0) (34)	BYU (12–0) (33)	BYU (13–0) (38)	1.
2.	Nebraska (5)	Nebraska (0–0) (7)	Clemson (2–0) (15)	Clemson (2–0) (15)	Texas (1–0) (2)	Ohio State (4–0) (5)	Washington (5–0) (1)	Oklahoma (4–0–1) (10)	Oklahoma (5–0–1) (7)	Texas (5–0–1) (3)	Nebraska (8–1)	South Carolina (9–0) (11)	Oklahoma (8–1–1) (7)	Oklahoma (9–1–1) (18)	Oklahoma (9–1–1) (16)	Washington (11–1) (16)	2.
3.	Pittsburgh (2)	Clemson (1–0) (2)	Michigan (1–0) (3)	Texas (1–0) (4)	Ohio State (3–0) (2)	Washington (4–0) (1)	Oklahoma (4–0) (1)	Texas (3–0–1) (4)	Texas (4–0–1) (3)	Nebraska (7–1) (3)	Texas (6–0–1)	BYU (10–0) (11)	Oklahoma State (9–1) (3)	Florida (8–1–1) (5)	Florida (9–1–1) (6)	Florida (9–1–1) (6)	3.
4.	Clemson (11)	UCLA (0–0) (6)	Texas (0–0) (1)	Miami (FL) (3–1) (1)	Penn State (3–0)	Boston College (3–0) (2)	Boston College (3–0) (2)	Boston College (4–0) (6)	Nebraska (6–1)	BYU (8–0) (4)	BYU (9–0)	Oklahoma State (8–1)	Florida (8–1–1) (7)	Washington (10–1) (1)	Washington (10–1) (1)	Nebraska (10–2)	4.
5.	UCLA (5)	Texas (0–0)	Iowa (1–0) (2) т	Ohio State (2–0)	Boston College (3–0)	Oklahoma (4–0) (1)	BYU (5–0)	Nebraska (5–1)	BYU (7–0) (3)	South Carolina (7–0)	South Carolina (8–0)	Florida (7–1–1)	Washington (10–1) (1)	Nebraska (9–2)	Nebraska (9–2)	Boston College (10–2)	5.
6.	Texas	Ohio State (0–0)	Miami (FL) (2–1) (1) т	BYU (3–0)	Washington (3–0)	Florida State (4–0)	Nebraska (4–1)	SMU (4–0) (1)	Ohio State (6–1)	Miami (FL) (7–2)	Miami (FL) (8–2)	Oklahoma (7–1–1)	Texas (7–1–1)	Ohio State (9–2)	Ohio State (9–2)	Oklahoma (9–2–1)	6.
7.	Ohio State	Notre Dame (0–0) (1)	UCLA (1–0) (2)	Penn State (2–0)	Oklahoma (3–0)	BYU (4–0)	SMU (3–0)	BYU (6–0)	LSU (5–0–1) (1)	Oklahoma State (6–1)	Oklahoma State (7–1)	USC (8–1)	Nebraska (9–2)	South Carolina (10–1)	South Carolina (10–1)	Oklahoma State (10–2)	7.
8.	Notre Dame (1)	Auburn (0–1)	BYU (2–0) (1)	UCLA (2–0) (2)	BYU (4–0)	Nebraska (3–1)	Ohio State (4–1)	Ohio State (5–1)	Miami (FL) (7–2)	Georgia (6–1)	Georgia (7–1)	Washington (9–1)	Ohio State (9–2)	Boston College (8–2)	Boston College (9–2)	SMU (10–2)	8.
9.	Alabama (1)	Alabama (0–0) (1)	Ohio State (1–0)	Washington (2–0)	Florida State (3–0)	Oklahoma State (4–0)	Florida State (4–0–1)	Miami (FL) (6–2)	South Carolina (6–0)	Boston College (5–1)	Oklahoma (6–1–1)	LSU (7–1–1)	South Carolina (9–1)	Oklahoma State (9–2)	Oklahoma State (9–2)	UCLA (9–3)	9.
10.	Miami (FL) (1)	Iowa (0–0) (1)	Boston College (2–0)	Boston College (2–0)	Oklahoma State (3–0)	SMU (3–0)	Miami (FL) (5–2)	LSU (4–0–1)	Oklahoma State (5–1)	Oklahoma (5–1–1)	Florida (6–1–1)	Texas (6–1–1)	Boston College (7–2)	SMU (8–2)	SMU (9–2)	USC (9–3)	10.
11.	Penn State	Penn State (0–0)	Auburn (0–1)	Oklahoma (2–0)	SMU (2–0)	Penn State (3–1)	Penn State (4–1)	South Carolina (5–0)	Boston College (4–1)	Auburn (6–2)	Florida State (6–1–1)	Ohio State (8–2)	SMU (7–2)	Auburn (8–3)	LSU (8–2–1)	South Carolina (10–2)	11.
12.	Iowa (1)	Arizona State (0–0)	Penn State (1–0)	Oklahoma State (2–0)	Georgia (2–0)	Georgia Tech (3–0)	LSU (3–0–1)	Oklahoma State (4–1)	Auburn (5–2)	West Virginia (7–1)	LSU (6–1–1)	TCU (8–1)	Miami (FL) (8–3)	Florida State (7–2–1)	Maryland (8–3)	Maryland (9–3)	12.
13.	Arizona State (2)	BYU (1–0)	Oklahoma State (1–0)	SMU (1–0)	Clemson (2–1)	Michigan (3–1)	Oklahoma State (4–1)	Auburn (4–2)	Georgia (5–1)	Florida (5–1–1)	Ohio State (7–2)	Boston College (6–2)	Auburn (8–3)	Texas (7–2–1)	Miami (FL) (8–4)	Ohio State (9–3)	13.
14.	Michigan (1)	Michigan (0–0) (1)	SMU (0–0)	Iowa (1–1)	Michigan (2–1)	Miami (FL) (4–2)	Purdue (4–1)	Georgia (4–1)	SMU (4–1)	Florida State (5–1–1)	USC (7–1)	Miami (FL) (8–3)	USC (8–2)	LSU (8–2–1)	UCLA (8–3)	Auburn (9–4)	14.
15.	SMU	SMU (0–0)	Oklahoma (1–0)	Florida State (2–0)	USC (2–0)	LSU (3–0–1)	Georgia (3–1)	Florida State (4–1–1)	Florida State (5–1–1)	LSU (5–1–1)	TCU (7–1)	Georgia (7–2)	Florida State (7–2–1)	Maryland (8–3)	Florida State (7–3–1)	LSU (8–3–1)	15.
16.	Oklahoma	Oklahoma (0–0)	Washington (1–0)	Michigan (1–1)	Miami (FL) (3–2)	Notre Dame (3–1)	Auburn (3–2)	Kentucky (5–0)	Florida (5–1–1)	Ohio State (6–2)	Boston College (5–2)	SMU (6–2)	LSU (7–2–1)	Miami (FL) (8–4)	Auburn (8–4)	Iowa (8–4–1)	16.
17.	Florida	Pittsburgh (0–1)	Pittsburgh (0–1)	USC (1–0)	UCLA (2–1)	UCLA (3–1)	South Carolina (4–0)	Florida (4–1–1)	Iowa (5–2)	Iowa (6–2)	SMU (5–2)	Florida State (6–2–1)	TCU (8–2)	UCLA (8–3)	Notre Dame (7–4)	Florida State (7–3–2)	17.
18.	Washington	Boston College (1–0)	Florida State (1–0)	West Virginia (3–0)	Georgia Tech (2–0)	Auburn (2–2)	Florida (3–1–1)	Iowa (4–2)	West Virginia (6–1)	USC (6–1)	Iowa (6–2–1)	Auburn (7–3)	Maryland (7–3)	Georgia (7–3)	USC (8–3)	Miami (FL) (8–5)	18.
19.	Boston College	Washington (0–0)	Alabama (0–1)	Auburn (0–2)	Notre Dame (2–1)	Vanderbilt (4–0)	Kentucky (4–0)	Penn State (4–2)	Penn State (5–2)	SMU (4–2)	West Virginia (7–2)	Virginia (7–1–1)	UCLA (8–3)	Notre Dame (7–4)	Texas (7–3–1)	Kentucky (9–3)	19.
20.	Florida State	Florida State (1–0)	USC (1–0)	Georgia (1–0)	Auburn (1–2)	Georgia (2–1)	Georgia Tech (3–1)	West Virginia (5–1)	USC (5–1)	TCU (6–1)	Auburn (6–3)	Clemson (7–2)	Georgia (7–3)	USC (8–3)	Wisconsin (7–3–1)	Virginia (8–2–2)	20.
	Preseason Aug	Week 1 Sep 4	Week 2 Sep 11	Week 3 Sep 18	Week 4 Sep 25	Week 5 Oct 2	Week 6 Oct 9	Week 7 Oct 16	Week 8 Oct 23	Week 9 Oct 30	Week 10 Nov 6	Week 11 Nov 13	Week 12 Nov 20	Week 13 Nov 27	Week 14 Dec 4	Week 15 (Final) Jan 2	
		Dropped: Florida	Dropped: Notre Dame; Arizona State	Dropped: Pittsburgh; Alabama	Dropped: Iowa; West Virginia	Dropped: Clemson; USC	Dropped: Michigan; Notre Dame; UCLA; Vanderbilt	Dropped: Purdue; Georgia Tech	Dropped: Kentucky	Dropped: Penn State	None	Dropped: Iowa; West Virginia	Dropped: Virginia; Clemson	Dropped: TCU	Dropped: Georgia	Dropped: Notre Dame; Texas; Wisconsin	

== Coaches Poll ==
	Preseason Aug 26	Week 1 Sep 4	Week 2 Sep 11	Week 3 Sep 18	Week 4 Sep 25	Week 5 Oct 2	Week 6 Oct 9	Week 7 Oct 16	Week 8 Oct 23	Week 9 Oct 30	Week 10 Nov 6	Week 11 Nov 13	Week 12 Nov 20	Week 13 Nov 27	Week 14 Dec 4	Week 15 (Final) Jan 2	
1.	Auburn (32)	Miami (FL) (2–0) (30)	Nebraska (1–0) (32)	Nebraska (2–0) (34)	Nebraska (3–0) (39)	Texas (2–0) (34)	Texas (3–0) (34)	Washington (6–0) (24)	Washington (7–0) (30)	Washington (8–0) (24)	Washington (9–0) (30)	Nebraska (9–1) (19)	BYU (11–0) (30)	BYU (12–0) (21)	BYU (12–0) (24)	BYU (13–0) (28)	1.
2.	Nebraska (1)	Nebraska (0–0) (4)	Michigan (1–0) (4)	Texas (1–0) (4)	Texas (1–0)	Ohio State (4–0) (1)	Oklahoma (4–0) (1)	Oklahoma (4–0–1) (3)	Texas (4–0–1) (7)	Texas (5–0–1)	Texas (6–0–1) (6)	South Carolina (9–0) (9)	Oklahoma State (9–1) (2)	Oklahoma (9–1–1) (10)	Oklahoma (9–1–1) (8)	Washington (11–1) (11)	2.
3.	Texas (4)	Texas (0–0)	Texas (0–0) (2)	Oklahoma (2–0)	Ohio State (3–0)	Oklahoma (4–0) (1)	Washington (5–0) (3)	Texas (3–0–1) (9)	Oklahoma (5–0–1) (2)	BYU (8–0) (5)	Nebraska (8–1) (2)	BYU (10–0) (12)	Oklahoma (8–1–1) (2)	Washington (10–1) (1)	Washington (10–1) (1)	Nebraska (10–2)	3.
4.	Miami (FL) (1)	UCLA (0–0)	Clemson (2–0)	BYU (3–0)	Oklahoma (3–0)	Washington (4–0) (3)	Boston College (3–0) (1)	Boston College (4–0) (2)	BYU (7–0) (1)	Nebraska (7–1) (2)	BYU (9–0) (4)	Oklahoma State (8–1)	Texas (7–1–1) (3)	Nebraska (9–2)	Nebraska (9–2)	Boston College (10–2)	4.
5.	UCLA (1)	Clemson (1–0)	Iowa (1–0)	Penn State (2–0)	Washington (3–0)	Boston College (3–0) (1)	BYU (5–0)	BYU (6–0) (1)	Nebraska (6–1)	South Carolina (7–0)	South Carolina (8–0)	Washington (9–1)	Washington (10–1) (1)	Ohio State (9–2)	Ohio State (9–2)	Oklahoma State (10–2)	5.
6.	Penn State	Auburn (0–1)	BYU (2–0) (1)	Ohio State (2–0)	Penn State (3–0)	BYU (4–0)	Nebraska (4–1)	Nebraska (5–1)	LSU (5–0–1) (1)	Miami (FL) (7–2)	Miami (FL) (8–2)	Oklahoma (7–1–1)	Ohio State (9–2)	South Carolina (10–1)	Florida (9–1–1) (2)	Oklahoma (9–2–1)	6.
7.	Pittsburgh (1)	Penn State (0–0)	UCLA (1–0)	Boston College (2–0)	Boston College (3–0) (1)	Florida State (4–0)	SMU (3–0)	SMU (4–0)	Ohio State (6–1) (1)	Boston College (5–1)	Oklahoma State (7–1)	USC (8–1)	Florida (8–1–1) (2)	Florida (8–1–1) (1)	South Carolina (10–1)	Florida (9–1–1) (1)	7.
8.	Clemson	Ohio State (0–0)	Miami (FL) (2–1)	Washington (2–0)	BYU (4–0)	Oklahoma State (4–0)	Florida State (4–0–1)	Ohio State (5–1) (1)	South Carolina (6–0)	Georgia (6–1)	Georgia (7–1)	Florida (7–1–1)	Nebraska (9–2)	Boston College (9–2)	Boston College (9–2)	SMU (10–2)	8.
9.	Ohio State	Michigan (0–0)	Boston College (2–0)	Miami (FL) (3–1)	Florida State (3–0)	Nebraska (3–1)	Ohio State (4–1)	LSU (4–0–1)	Miami (FL) (7–2)	West Virginia (7–1)	Oklahoma (6–1–1)	Texas (6–1–1)	South Carolina (9–1)	Oklahoma State (9–2)	Oklahoma State (9–2)	USC (9–3)	9.
10.	Michigan	Oklahoma (0–0)	Auburn (0–1)	UCLA (2–0)	Georgia (2–0)	SMU (3–0)	LSU (3–0–1)	Miami (FL) (6–2)	Boston College (4–1)	Oklahoma State (6–1)	Florida State (6–1–1)	TCU (8–1)	Boston College (7–2)	SMU (8–2)	SMU (9–2)	UCLA (9–3)	10.
11.	Oklahoma	Alabama (0–0)	Ohio State (1–0)	Oklahoma State (2–0)	Oklahoma State (3–0)	Michigan (3–1)	Miami (FL) (5–2)	South Carolina (5–0)	Oklahoma State (5–1)	Auburn (6–2)	Florida (6–1–1)	Ohio State (8–2)	Auburn (8–3)	Auburn (8–3)	Maryland (8–3)	Maryland (9–3)	11.
12.	Alabama	BYU (1–0)	Oklahoma (1–0)	SMU (1–0)	SMU (2–0)	Georgia Tech (3–0)	Penn State (4–1)	Oklahoma State (4–1)	Georgia (5–1)	Oklahoma (5–1–1)	USC (7–1)	LSU (7–1–1)	Miami (FL) (8–3) т	Texas (7–2–1)	LSU (8–2–1)	Ohio State (9–3)	12.
13.	Arizona State	Arizona State (0–0)	Penn State (1–0)	Florida State (2–0)	Michigan (2–1)	LSU (3–0–1)	Oklahoma State (4–1)	Auburn (4–2)	Auburn (5–2)	Iowa (6–2)	Ohio State (7–2)	Boston College (6–2)	USC (8–2) т	Florida State (7–2–1)	Miami (FL) 8–4	South Carolina (10–2)	13.
14.	Iowa	Iowa (0–0)	Oklahoma State (1–0)	Michigan (1–1)	USC (2–0)	Penn State (3–1)	South Carolina (4–0)	Georgia (4–1)	West Virginia (6–1)	Florida State (5–1–1)	TCU (7–1)	Virginia (7–1–1)	SMU (7–2)	Maryland (8–3)	USC (8–3)	Auburn (9–4)	14.
15.	Notre Dame (1)	Notre Dame (0–0)	SMU (0–0)	Iowa (1–1)	UCLA (2–1)	Notre Dame (3–1)	Georgia (3–1)	Kentucky (5–0)	Florida State (5–1–1)	Florida (5–1–1)	LSU (6–1–1)	SMU (6–2)	Florida State (7–2–1)	LSU (8–2–1)	UCLA (8–3)	Iowa (8–4–1)	15.
16.	SMU	Boston College (1–0)	Washington (1–0)	USC (1–0)	Miami (FL) (3–2)	Miami (FL) (4–2)	Auburn (3–2)	Florida State (4–1–1)	SMU (4–1)	USC (6–1)	Boston College (5–2)	Georgia (7–2)	TCU (8–2)	Miami (8–4)	Florida State (7–3–1)	LSU (8–3–1)	16.
17.	Washington	SMU (0–0)	Florida State (1–0)	Georgia (1–0)	Notre Dame (2–1)	Vanderbilt (4–0)	Purdue (4–1)	Iowa (4–2)	Iowa (5–2)	LSU (5–1–1)	Iowa (6–2–1)	Miami (FL) (8–3)	Virginia (7–1–2)	USC (8–3)	Wisconsin (7–3–1)	Virginia (8–2–2)	17.
18.	Florida	Washington (0–0)	USC (1–0)	West Virginia (3–0)	LSU (2–0–1)	Auburn (2–2)	Florida (3–1–1)	Florida (4–1–1)	Florida (5–1–1)	Ohio State (6–2)	West Virginia (7–2)	Florida State (6–2–1)	LSU (7–2–1)	UCLA (8–3)	Notre Dame (7–4)	West Virginia (8–4)	18.
19.	Georgia	Florida State (1–0)	Georgia (1–0)	Tennessee (2–0)	Auburn (1–2)	Georgia (2–1)	Iowa (3–2)	West Virginia (5–1)	USC (5–1)	TCU (6–1)	Virginia (6–1–1)	Auburn (7–3)	Maryland (7–3)	Wisconsin (7–3–1)	Auburn (8–4)	Kentucky (9–3) т	19.
20.	Boston College	Pittsburgh (0–1)	Alabama (0–1)	Auburn (0–2)	Iowa (1–2)	South Carolina (3–0) т; Iowa (2–2) т	Kentucky (4–0)	Michigan (4–2)	Penn State (5–2)	Cal State Fullerton (9–0)	SMU (5–2)	Penn State (6–3)	Wisconsin (7–3–1)	Notre Dame (7–4)	Texas (7–3–1)	Florida State (7–3–2) т	20.
	Preseason Aug 26	Week 1 Sep 4	Week 2 Sep 11	Week 3 Sep 18	Week 4 Sep 25	Week 5 Oct 2	Week 6 Oct 9	Week 7 Oct 16	Week 8 Oct 23	Week 9 Oct 30	Week 10 Nov 6	Week 11 Nov 13	Week 12 Nov 20	Week 13 Nov 27	Week 14 Dec 4	Week 15 (Final) Jan 2	
		Dropped: Florida; Georgia	Dropped: Arizona State; Notre Dame; Pittsburgh	Dropped: Clemson; Alabama	Dropped: West Virginia; Tennessee	Dropped: USC; UCLA	Dropped: Michigan; Georgia Tech; Notre Dame; Vanderbilt	Dropped: Penn State; Purdue	Dropped: Kentucky; Michigan	Dropped: SMU; Penn State	Dropped: Auburn; Cal State Fullerton	Dropped: Iowa	Dropped: Georgia; Penn State	Dropped: TCU; Virginia	None	Dropped: Miami (FL); Wisconsin; Notre Dame; Texas	

== FWAA poll ==
The Football Writers Association of America awarded the Grantland Rice Award to BYU based on the post-bowl voting of a 5-member committee.

	Final January 3	
1.	BYU	1.
2.	Washington	2.
3.	Florida	3.
	Final January 3	

== USA Today / CNN Top 25 ==
The USA Today / CNN Top 25 football poll:

	Week 16 Final Jan 3	
1.	BYU 789 (26)	1.
2.	Washington 751 (30)	2.
3.	Florida 746 (3)	3.
4.	Nebraska 689	4.
5.	Oklahoma 660	5.
6.	Boston College 648	6.
7.	Oklahoma State 625	7.
8.	SMU 543	8.
9.	Maryland 512	9.
10.	South Carolina 486	10.
11.	USC 465	11.
12.	UCLA 442	12.
13.	LSU 438	13.
14.	Ohio State 376	14.
15.	Auburn 368	15.
16.	Miami (FL) 279	16.
17.	Florida State 242	17.
18.	Virginia 212	18.
19.	Kentucky 210	19.
20.	Iowa 173	20.
21.	West Virginia 129	21.
22.	Army 110	22.
23.	Georgia 97	23.
24.	Air Force 93	24.
25.	Notre Dame 91	25.
	Week 16 Final Jan 3	

== Football News ==
Newspaper Football News published the results of their final poll in the January 31, 1985, issue. The Washington Huskies narrowly earned No. 1 above Brigham Young on the strength of their victory over Oklahoma in the Orange Bowl.

	Week Final January 31	
1.	Washington 153	1.
2.	BYU 148	2.
3.	Nebraska 139	3.
4.	Florida 136	4.
5.	Oklahoma 125	5.
6.	Boston College 119	6.
7.	Oklahoma State 115	7.
8.	UCLA 99	8.
9.	SMU 91	9.
10.	South Carolina 88	10.
11.	USC 75	11.
12.	Ohio State 62	12.
13.	Maryland 60	13.
14.	Iowa 57	14.
15.	Auburn 39	15.
16.	LSU 36	16.
17.	Miami (FL) 30	17.
18.	Virginia 29	18.
19.	Florida State 28	19.
20.	Kentucky 14	20.
	Week Final January 31	

== Sporting News ==
	Week 16 Final Jan 3	
1.	Florida	1.
2.	Nebraska	2.
3.	Washington	3.
4.	BYU	4.
5.	Boston College	5.
6.	Oklahoma	6.
7.	Oklahoma State	7.
8.	South Carolina	8.
9.	SMU	9.
10.	Maryland	10.
11.	UCLA	11.
12.	Miami (FL)	12.
13.	Ohio State	13.
14.	Auburn	14.
15.	USC	15.
16.	Florida State	16.
17.	Iowa	17.
18.	Virginia	18.
19.	Army	19.
20.	Georgia	20.
	Week 16 Final Jan 3	
