= Montana State Bobcats =

Collegiate athletics teams of Montana State University

- University: Montana State University
- Conference: Big Sky Conference (primary); Rocky Mountain Intercollegiate Ski Association (men's and women's skiing); NIRA (rodeo)
- NCAA: Division I (FCS)
- Athletic director: Leon Costello
- Location: Bozeman, Montana
- Varsity teams: 14
- Football stadium: Bobcat Stadium
- Basketball arena: Worthington Arena at Brick Breeden Fieldhouse
- Volleyball arena: Shroyer Gymnasium
- Other venues: Bridger Bowl (skiing)
- Mascot: Champ
- Nickname: Bobcats
- Colors: Blue and gold
- Website: msubobcats.com

Big Sky Conference logo in Montana State's colors

The Montana State Bobcats are the varsity athletic teams representing Montana State University in Bozeman in intercollegiate athletics. The university sponsors thirteen teams including men and women's basketball, cross country, skiing, tennis, and track and field; women's-only golf and volleyball; and men's-only football. The Bobcats compete in NCAA Division I and are members of the Big Sky Conference with the exception of the men's and women's skiing teams which belong to the Rocky Mountain Intercollegiate Ski Association. Their main rivals are the Grizzlies of the University of Montana in Missoula. Both schools are charter members of the Big Sky Conference, which began competition 63 years ago in the fall of 1963.

== Sports sponsored ==
Men's sports	Women's sports
Basketball	Basketball
Cross Country	Cross Country
Football	Golf
Skiing	Skiing
Tennis	Tennis
Track & Field	Track & Field
	Volleyball
Co-ed sports
Spirit Squad

=== Basketball ===
Montana State Bobcats basketball history includes one of college basketball's legendary teams, the Golden Bobcats of the late 1920s. The school's basketball teams had acclaimed fame throughout the 1920s by playing "racehorse basketball" and becoming one of the first schools in the nation to employ what is known as the fast break. Montana State College coach Ott Romney, who graduated with a Masters from MSC prior to World War I, pioneered the style of play, and by 1926 had assembled a team perfectly suited to playing an up-tempo brand of ball. Cat Thompson, John "Brick" Breeden, Frank Ward, Val Glynn and Max Worthington were at the heart of the MSC team that won the Rocky Mountain Conference title three straight seasons, and bested Utah State, BYU, Colorado, and University of Denver. The 1928–29 team reached college basketball's zenith by defeating the AAU Champion Cook's Painters in a two-of-three series and steamrolling to the Rocky Mountain Conference title. The Bobcats were retroactively recognized as the pre-NCAA Tournament national champion for the 1928–29 season by the Premo-Porretta Power Poll and the Helms Athletic Foundation. The Helms Foundation also named Cat Thompson one of the five greatest players in the first half of the 20th century in college hoops.

=== Football ===
In 1956 the Bobcats football team took a share of the NAIA championship in the Aluminum Bowl in Little Rock, Arkansas playing to a 0–0 tie on a muddy field with the Pumas of St. Joseph’s College from Rensselaer, Indiana. In 1976 the Bobcats of Montana State won a national football title in NCAA Division II at Wichita Falls, Texas beating the Zips of Akron, Ohio 24-13 in the title game. In 1984, the Bobcats returned to a national football title game played in Charleston, South Carolina, beating the Bulldogs of Louisiana Tech 19-6 for their third national football title. The MSU Bobcats football is the only college team with national titles in three different classifications. The team has won 19 conference titles and has made the NCAA FCS playoffs 9 times.

=== Rodeo ===
Montana State Bobcats rodeo team has a long history with the National Intercollegiate Rodeo Association. For almost 30 years MSU hosted the College National Finals Rodeo. Bobcat Rodeo teams have won 8 national team titles, 32 individual national championships and multiple Big Sky Regional crowns. The Bobcats Rodeo team operates under the MSU Department of Student Affairs and enjoys outstanding booster support form the C.A.T. Rodeo Scholarship Association.

=== Skiing ===
Montana State Bobcats Alpine and Nordic Ski team compete in the Rocky Mountain Intercollegiate Ski Association and the NCAA Western Region and has produced 13 national champions. The Bobcat Nordic and alpine ski program venues at Bridger Bowl and Bohart Ranch have hosted six NCAA National Championships. The Big Sky Conference dropped its sponsorship of skiing and four other sports after the 1974 season.

=== Spirit Squad ===
The Montana State Spirit Squad is broken down into the Cheer team and Dance team.

== National championships ==
Montana State has won four national championships (one shared due to a tie), with three being in the NCAA.

Season	Division	Sport	Coach	Score	Opponent
1956	NAIA	Football	Tony Storti	T 0–0	St. Joseph's
1976	Division II	Football	Sonny Holland	W 24–13	Akron Zips
1984	Division I-AA	Football	Dave Arnold	W 19–6	Louisiana Tech Bulldogs
2025	Division I FCS	Football	Brent Vigen	W 35–34 (OT)	Illinois State Redbirds

== Former sports ==
=== Baseball ===
Montana State dropped its baseball program 55 years ago, following the 1971 season, and rival Montana played just one additional year. The Big Sky dropped baseball after the 1974 season, along with four other sports.

=== Wrestling ===
The Bobcat wrestling program won the first three Big Sky titles (1964, 1965, 1966); the conference discontinued the sport 39 years ago, after the 1987 season.
