= Montana–Montana State football rivalry =

American college football rivalry

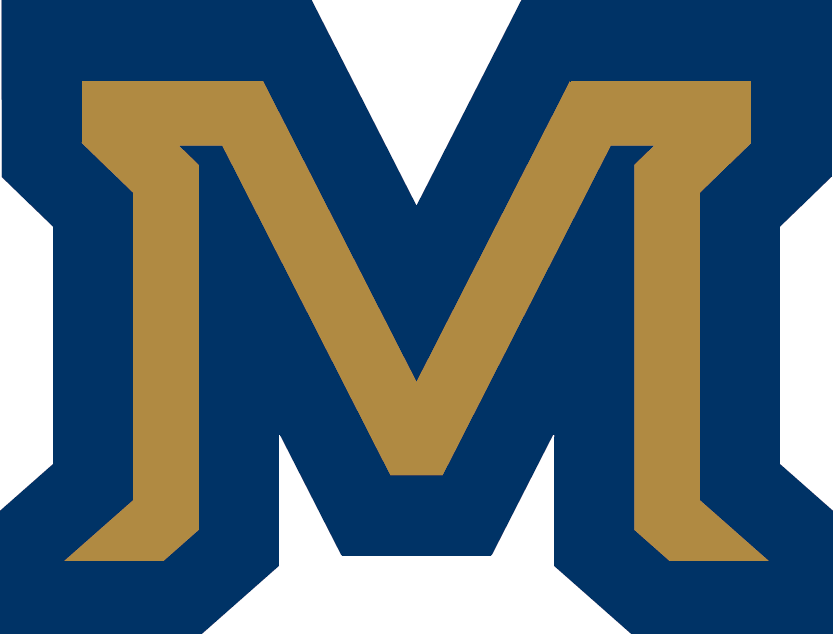
- Montana Grizzlies Montana State Bobcats
- Sport: Football
- First meeting: November 25, 1897; Montana, 18–6
- Latest meeting: November 21, 2026; Montana State, 42–16
- Next meeting: November 20, 2027
- Stadiums: Bobcat Stadium (Bozeman); Washington–Grizzly Stadium (Missoula)
- Trophy: Great Divide Trophy

Statistics
- Total meetings: 126
- All-time series: Montana leads, 74–46–5 (.612)
- Trophy series: Montana State, 13–11 (.542)
- Largest victory: Montana, 79–0 (1904)
- Longest win streak: Montana, 16 (1986–2001)
- Current win streak: Montana State, 4 (2024–present)

Locations of Montana and Montana State

The Montana–Montana State football rivalry is an annual college football rivalry game between the University of Montana Grizzlies and the Montana State University Bobcats. The game is most historically and accurately known as the Cat-Griz game, or the Griz-Cat game. Since 1997, the match has been advertised as the Brawl of the Wild. The winner receives the massive Great Divide Trophy, as the universities are on opposite sides of the continental divide.

The rivalry began in 1897, making it the 31st-oldest in NCAA Division I and the eleventh-oldest west of the Mississippi River. It is also the fourth-oldest Football Championship Subdivision rivalry. Since 1993, the match-up has been the final game of the season for both teams, and has often had implications for the Big Sky Conference championship and its automatic bid to the NCAA Division I Football Championship playoffs. Previously, it was usually played in late October or early November.

As of 2025, the game has been played 125 times. Montana officially leads the all-time series 74–45–5 (.617), with one Montana victory (2011) having been vacated by the National Collegiate Athletic Association (NCAA).

== History ==
The series has three distinct periods. From 1897 to 1916, Montana State did not belong to a conference, while Montana was in the Northwest Intercollegiate Athletic Association. In addition to Montana, the Northwest Conference included Washington, Washington State, Oregon, Oregon State, Idaho, and Whitman College. At times, the two teams would play twice per year. Early seasons had seven games or less, and one season the teams played just one game. Four of the five ties in the series came during this era. Montana won twelve games to Montana State's seven.

Montana State joined the Rocky Mountain Athletic Conference (RMAC) in 1917, and Montana joined the Pacific Coast Conference (today's Pac-12 Conference) in 1924. The RMAC included several teams that later became Mountain West Conference members. When MSU joined the RMAC, it included Colorado, Colorado State, Utah, Utah State, and Brigham Young. When Montana joined the PCC, it included Stanford, California, USC, Oregon, Oregon State, Washington, Washington State, and Idaho. The Bobcats were a member of the RMAC, which moved into the NAIA, in 1938 and remained a member through 1956. The Grizzlies were a member of the PCC through the 1949 season before joining the Skyline (a.k.a., Mountain States) Conference, which included Colorado, Utah State, Denver, Utah, Colorado State, Brigham Young, New Mexico and Wyoming from 1951 to 1961. MSU was independent from 1957 to 1962 and UM was independent in 1950 and 1962. During this period UM enjoyed a 30–8–1 (.782) edge in Cat-Griz games, while MSU shared the NAIA national title in 1956.

Both schools entered the Big Sky Conference as charter members in 1963, with Montana then holding a 43–16–5 (.711) series lead. Prior to that, UM was in conferences with what are now FBS and Power 5 conference schools, while MSU was either not in a conference or in a NAIA conference, for 49 of the 59 games played. UM holds a 37–7–5 (.806) advantage in those games. In games that the schools were in the same or similar classifications, it is tied at 37–37 (.500).

In the first 23 years of the Big Sky Conference, Montana State enjoyed its most successful run in the Cat-Griz rivalry with a 17–6 (.739) record and two national titles, in Division II (1976) and Division I‑AA (1984). A new period began in 1986, often known in Montana as "The Streak", in which the Grizzlies won sixteen straight in the series; a few games were close, but most gave a strong indication that the programs were going in very different directions. Montana won two Division I-AA championships during "The Streak" (1995, 2001) while the Bobcats suffered a winless season in 2000.

On November 19, 2022, ESPN's College GameDay broadcast live from Dyche Field on the campus of Montana State in Bozeman on the morning prior to the 121st edition of the rivalry.

== Great Divide Trophy ==
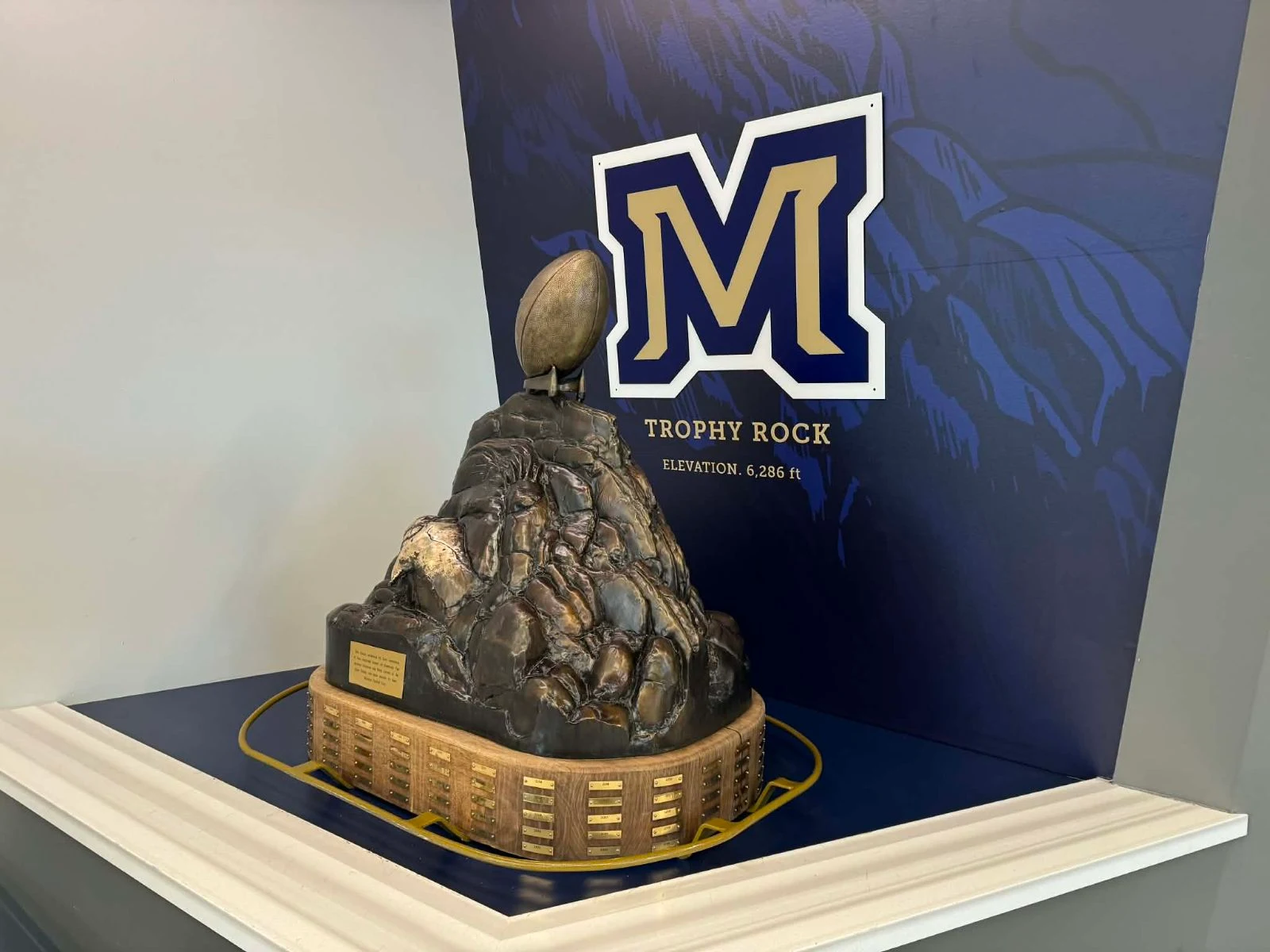
Great Divide trophy in 2025

The Great Divide Trophy was created in 2001 by Dave Samuelson, and was made possible by numerous donations. The winner of each game possesses the trophy for one year. The school with the most wins during the trophy period will take permanent possession of the trophy at the end of the 21st century.

Montana was the first to receive the trophy following their victory in 2001; it has changed hands eleven times, most recently in 2024, and the trophy series is led by Montana State 12–11 (.522) after the Bobcats won 31–28 in the 2025 Brawl of the Wild..

The Great Divide Trophy weighs a massive 306 pounds (139 kg), and is among the heaviest trophies in college football.

== Notable games ==
=== 1968 ===
In 1968, quarterback Dennis Erickson, flanker Ron Bain, and running back Paul Schafer lead a monumental comeback as the Bobcats clinched a tie for the Big Sky championship—their third straight. Trailing 24–9 in the fourth quarter, Montana State scored twenty points in the last nine minutes and won 29–24 when Schafer, who had 58 carries for 234 yards in the game, dove into the end zone with twelve seconds left. The Grizzlies appeared to have the drive stopped at the MSU 32, but a facemask penalty gave the Cats new life on the 17.

In all, 34 points were scored in the final quarter. Bain's brother, Doug of the Grizzlies, gave Montana a 17–9 lead early in the quarter on a pass from Ray Brum. After another UM touchdown made the score 24–9 with just over 10 minutes to go, it looked as if the Grizzlies would win going away, but the Bobcats rallied. Schaefer scored on a short run with 8:15 to play and Erickson hit Bain for a touchdown with five minutes left cutting the lead to two at 24–22.

After Schafer's touchdown, the Grizzlies nearly spoiled things for MSU. UM took over at the 20. Speedy receiver Ron Baines gained 15 yards, on top of which another 15 were tacked on for an unnecessary roughness penalty. Baines then made a circus run of 37 yards from midfield before he was dragged down at the MSU 13 by MSU defensive back Terry Brown as time expired.

=== 1997 ===
In another exciting finish in the series, Montana State fought back from a 21–7 halftime deficit only to lose 27–25 on an improbable last-second field goal by Kris Heppner. Just as the first half ended, MSU was whistled for having too many men on the field, which gave Montana one extra play. The Grizzlies made the Bobcats pay for this mistake by scoring a touchdown on a long TD pass by Brian Ah Yat to end the half. Behind the passing of Rob Compson MSU methodically worked its way back into the game and took a 25–24 lead on a three-yard run by Eric Kinnamon with 22 seconds to play in Bobcat Stadium. The Bobcats appeared poised to snap an 11-game losing streak to the Grizzlies, but Montana wasn't done.

Thanks to a kickoff that sailed out of bounds, Montana got the ball on its own 35-yard line with no time expended from the clock. After an incomplete pass, UM quarterback Brian Ah Yat found receiver Justin Olsen for a completion of 46 yards to the MSU 19 with eight seconds to play. Ah Yat recovered his own muffed snap on the next play. After a UM timeout, Kris Heppner kicked a 38-yard field goal as time expired, giving Montana the 27–25 win.

The Bobcats also misfired on special teams all game. Prior to kicking the ball out of bounds, they failed on three extra point attempts, which would've given them a 28–24 lead on Kinnamon's touchdown and forced UM to score a touchdown instead of a field goal on its final drive.

=== 1998 ===
Montana State would get its heart broken again a year later. Leading in this game 21–20, and ahead for most of the second half, the Bobcats fell when Dallas Neil took a pass from Brian Ah Yat and tightroped the sideline for an 18-yard touchdown with just over five minutes to play. UM converted the two-point attempt and the Grizzlies won 28–21.

The game was played at a slippery Washington-Grizzly Stadium in Missoula, and extended the UM winning streak to 13 over MSU.

=== 2002 ===
The Bobcats would finally put an end to their losing streak against the Griz at 16 games when true freshman quarterback Travis Lulay led them to a 10–7 win in Missoula on a snowy, windy day. Lulay connected with Junior Adams for a 53-yard touchdown in the third quarter, and after a fumble led to Montana's lone score of the day, MSU's defense made the 10–7 score hold up.

The Bobcats held UM quarterback John Edwards to just 8-for-32 and 106 yards passing on the day. Edwards completed just one pass in the first half. MSU was led by senior running back Ryan Johnson, who ran for 132 yards, and cornerback Joey Thomas, who blocked a field goal and played a big role in Edwards' struggles.

=== 2010 ===
The Grizzlies needed a win in their final regular season game to continue its string of 12 straight conference championships and 17 straight playoff appearances. The Bobcats needed a win to clinch the conference title and a seed in the playoffs. With the game being played in Missoula, the Grizzlies appeared to have the advantage, but MSU scored touchdowns on its first three possessions and made them hold up for a 21–16 win with clutch defensive play in the second half.

UM advanced the ball inside the MSU 10-yard line twice in the second half, but the Bobcats forced fumbles on both possessions, including one by star running back Chase Reynolds. UM drove to the MSU 14 for a first and 10 with under two minutes to play, but MSU defensive end Dustin O'Connell came through for the Bobcats. O'Connell (who had just returned from a severely broken collarbone) and linebacker Jody Owens dropped Reynolds for a one-yard loss on first down. O'Connell then hurried UM quarterback Justin Roper into throwing an incomplete pass on second down, and batted down a pass intended for a wide-open Kavario Middleton on third down. Roper threw the ball out of bounds on fourth down. UM would get one more chance to score when it moved the ball to the MSU 34, but the Bobcats sealed the win with an interception on the goal line by senior captain Michael Rider on the last play of the game.

=== 2011 ===
Montana State entered the 111th clash as the No. 1 ranked team in the nation for the first time since 1985. The Grizzlies put an end to that in humiliating fashion with a 36–10 win in front of the largest crowd (20,247) to attend a Cat-Griz game in Bozeman.

A safety by UM cornerback Trumaine Johnson helped set up a short TD pass on a fourth-down pass late in the first half to give UM a 12–0 lead. After Montana State scored quickly to start the second half, the Grizzlies answered on the next play with a 79-yard bomb from Jordan Johnson to Jabin Sambrano. UM cruised from there. Montana finished the game with 309 yards rushing.

Coach Pflugrad led Montana to a Big Sky Conference title and a national semifinal appearance in 2011, but the Brawl of the Wild win, the title and semifinal appearance were vacated by the NCAA on July 26, 2013 due to infractions involving booster benefits to players, including bail money and free legal representation. Individually, Pflugrad was hit with numerous sanctions by the NCAA for his part in the infractions.

=== 2012 ===
Montana hadn't had a losing season since 1986, the year it moved into Washington-Grizzly Stadium, but that would all change as the Bobcats won 16–7 to take their second straight win and third in six tries in what is arguably the toughest road venue in the FCS. The loss left the Grizzlies with a 5–6 overall mark and a 3–5 conference mark. They finished the year 3–3 at home, the first time they failed to finish above .500 at home.

After a first-quarter touchdown gave UM a 7–3 lead, MSU didn't allow another point and only gave up 192 yards in holding Montana to one of its lowest scoring outputs in stadium history. Kruiz Siewing, from tiny Saco, Montana, scored MSU's only TD on a pass from DeNarius McGhee, and Rory Perez kicked three field goals, including the game-clincher with 2:32 to play.

=== 2016 ===
Montana State, which came into the game with a 3–7 record, went into Missoula and rushed for the most yards (368) by an opponent in Washington-Grizzly Stadium history, as it knocked off Montana, 24–17. The loss eliminated the Grizzlies from the FCS playoffs, by virtue of the Griz's 6–5 season record. It marked the first time that both teams missed the playoffs since 1992.

The Bobcats found themselves in a 7–0 hole after the first offensive play of the game by UM, as Brady Gustafson hit Justin Calhoun from 58 yards. MSU would allow just one first down the rest of the half, however, and true freshman quarterback Chris Murray scored from eight yards away when he flipped into the end zone on a running play, and again from 48 yards out when he out-raced UM's defenders to give the Bobcats a 14–7 halftime lead. A pair of long runs by Gunnar Brekke (65 yards) and Nick LaSane (61 yards) set up a field goal, and touchdown as MSU stretched its lead to 24–7.

The Grizzlies mounted a comeback with 10 straight points, but surrendered the ball on downs at the MSU 29 with 6:20 to play. The Bobcats, who had gone 3-and-out on their previous two series, were able to drain the clock on the ensuing possession. Murray ran for two first downs, then completed a 26-yard pass to Connor Sullivan on fourth-and-1 to seal the win.

Murray completed just two passes in the game, but rushed for 142 yards to become the third MSU freshman quarterback to start and win a Cat-Griz game at Washington-Grizzly Stadium. He joined Travis Lulay and DeNarius McGhee, who accomplished the feat in 2002 and 2010, respectively.

=== 2018 ===
The greatest comeback in Cat-Griz history occurred in 2018 at Washington-Grizzly Stadium in Missoula when Montana State rallied from a 22–0 deficit to a 29–25 win when it forced and recovered a fumble after Montana advanced the ball to within one-foot of the goal line with 14 seconds to play. The play was made possible when MSU coach Jeff Choate called a timeout just before the Grizzlies ran a play from the same spot that appeared to give them the go-ahead score.

To add to the drama, both teams entered the day with 6–4 records with the winner earning an at-large spot in the Football Championship Subdivision playoffs. The Bobcats came into the game having won the past two games with both wins knocking the Grizzlies out of contention for an at-large playoff spot.

Choate called the timeout to get a look at the formation UM was going to set up. The timeout call was met with boos from the large Grizzly crowd who felt the GRIZ had already hiked the ball and a touchdown scored. When the Bobcats re-took the field UM was in essentially the same formation. Two MSU interior linemen, Tucker Yates and Chase Benson knocked the interior linemen for UM on their heels and middle linebacker Grant Collins dove into UM running back Adam Eastwood. Yates jarred the ball loose from Eastwood and Collins knocked it to the ground where defensive end Derek Marks recovered the ball to send the MSU bench into a frenzy.

UM scored on its first drive and the Grizzly' defense held MSU to just 50 yards until late in the second quarter, while tacking on two more scores behind the strong passing of quarterback Dalton Sneed to take a 22–0 lead. MSU would get on the board in the final minute of the first half to cut the lead to 22–7, which was a boon for the Bobcats who were set to receive the opening kickoff of the second half.

The Bobcats couldn't do much with the momentum, however, and the two teams trade punts for most of the third quarter before the Bobcats drove inside the Grizzly 10 as the fourth quarter started. MSU quarterback Troy Andersen, who scored the Bobcats' first touchdown, scored again and also ran in a two-point conversion to cap off an 88-yard drive and whittle the lead down to 22–15. It was the first of three straight scoring drives for MSU.

After a UM field goal made it 25–15, the Bobcats marched 75 yards and once again got a TD run by Andersen to draw within three points at 25–22. On UM's next possession Collins forced and recovered a Sneed fumble to set up the Bobcats in Montana territory. Facing a first-and-20 on the UM 21 the Bobcats got an eight-yard run by Andersen and a 13-yard TD run by Logan Jones to take the lead with just over two minutes to play.

The Grizzlies would take the kickoff back to the 50-yard line and then worked the ball inside the one-yard line before MSU thwarted them. The win also earned the Bobcats a berth in the FCS playoffs and marked the third straight win in the rivalry. The win matched the 1968 game for biggest fourth quarter comebacks as MSU trailed by 15 points in both games. Sneed finished with 354 yards passing and two touchdown passes in the loss. Two UM receivers Samuel Akem (147) and Keenan Curran (111) had over 100 yards receiving. Andersen ran for 107 yards and three TDs, while Travis Jonsen had 101 yards receiving for MSU and Bobcat' punter Jared Padmos had three punts downed inside the five-yard line.

=== 2022 ===
The 2022 version attracted ESPN's College GameDay to Bozeman. Pre-game festivities attracted fans from around the state representing both schools onto the Montana State campus and many of them stayed up all night to have a spot near the stage. Longtime host Lee Corso, who traditionally makes his pick for the game being played on location by donning the mascot head of the team he picks, went with MSU mascot Champ's head.

Corso turned out to be correct. After an early 7–7 tie, the Bobcats rattled off 48 unanswered points against Montana, which came into the game with the No. 13 ranking in the nation to MSU's No. 3 ranking. The Bobcats humiliated the Grizzlies and finished with a 55–21 win on the heels of a 439-yard team rushing effort. MSU didn't attempt a pass against the Grizzlies until the second quarter after running the ball on its first 17 plays. The win was the fifth in the last six games for the Bobcats.

=== 2023 ===
The 2023 version in Missoula had major implications. For the first time in the history of the Brawl of the Wild, both teams entered the game ranked in the top 5 of the FCS Stats poll. At stake was the outright Big Sky Conference title and a potential chance at the No. 2 national seed in the playoffs. Montana secured their first Big Sky Conference title since 2009 and earned the No. 2 seed for the playoffs with a 37–7 victory.

=== 2025: Two Brawls ===
On November 22, No. 3 Montana State faced No. 2 Montana (11–0) in Missoula. It was the first matchup in the series with both ranked in the top 3 of the FCS Stats poll. The Bobcats won 31–28 to win the Big Sky Conference and became the first team to win the rivalry game on the road since 2018. Caden Dowler intercepted a Keali'i Ah Yat pass late in the third quarter and returned it for a touchdown to give the Bobcats a 24–21 lead. Moments later Missoula native Zac Crews blocked a Grizzlies field goal attempt and the Bobcats would score again to take a 31–21 lead. MSU quarterback Justin Lamson finished with 18 completions on 20 attempts for 175 yards and ran for 80 yards on 16 carries with a 22-yard touchdown for the winning points. Both teams were given byes to the second round in the FCS Playoffs, with Montana State being ranked 2nd and Montana being ranked 3rd.

In the quarterfinals, Montana State defeated Stephen F. Austin while Montana defeated South Dakota to ensure that the semifinals would match Montana and Montana State on December 20 (held in Bozeman) for the right to play for the Division I FCS National Championship. The 125th edition of the game was the first to be held in December and was the first-ever playoff matchup. It was also the first time since 1913 that the game has been held twice in one year. Montana State won the game 48–23 with a surge of 21 points in five minutes of the fourth quarter, sending the Bobcats to the National Championship game in Nashville. The Bobcats took a 20-3 lead in the second quarter on a 54-yard touchdown run by Missoula native Adam Jones. The Grizzlies battled back to take a 23-20 lead early in the third quarter, but MSU scored late in the third quarter to retake the lead at 27–23, then got an 87-yard touchdown on a pass from Justin Lamson to Taco Dowler on third-down-and-20 to take control. Jones finished with 131 yards rushing and two touchdowns, while Lamson ran for two touchdowns and threw for two more. Dowler finished with 125 yards on five receptions.

== Accomplishments by the two rivals ==
Team	Montana	Montana State
National titles	2	4
Conference titles	18	23
Consensus All-Americans	43	23
Walter Payton Awards	1	1
Buck Buchanan Awards	3	2
All-time program record	616–505–26	523–492–32
All-time win percentage	.548	.515

== Game results ==
Montana victories	Montana State victories	Tie games	Vacated wins (Note: On July 26, 2013, the NCAA vacated Montana's last five wins of the 2011 season, including the win against Montana State.)

No.	Date	Location	Winner	Score
1	November 26, 1897	Bozeman, MT	Montana	18–6
2	November 11, 1898	Missoula, MT	Montana	6–0
3	November 25, 1898	Missoula, MT	Montana	16–0
4	November 5, 1899	Missoula, MT	Montana State	5–0
5	November 26, 1899	Missoula, MT	Montana State	38–0
6	November 27, 1900	Missoula, MT	Montana State	38–0
7	November 29, 1901	Missoula, MT	Montana State	31–0
8	November 28, 1902	Missoula, MT	Montana State	38–0
9	November 27, 1903	Missoula, MT	Montana State	13–6
10	November 24, 1904	Missoula, MT	Montana	79–0
11	October 10, 1908	Missoula, MT	Tie	0–0
12	November 20, 1908	Bozeman, MT	Montana State	5–0
13	October 22, 1909	Bozeman, MT	Montana	3–0
14	November 25, 1909	Missoula, MT	Montana	15–5
15	October 27, 1910	Bozeman, MT	Tie	0–0
16	November 25, 1910	Missoula, MT	Montana	10–0
17	October 19, 1912	Bozeman, MT	Montana	7–0
18	November 9, 1912	Missoula, MT	Montana	39–3
19	November 1, 1913	Bozeman, MT	Montana	7–0
20	November 14, 1913	Missoula, MT	Montana	20–7
21	November 6, 1914	Missoula, MT	Montana	26–9
22	November 11, 1916	Bozeman, MT	Tie	6–6
23	November 10, 1917	Missoula, MT	Montana	9–7
24	November 22, 1919	Bozeman, MT	Tie	6–6
25	November 13, 1920	Missoula, MT	Montana	28–0
26	November 11, 1921	Bozeman, MT	Montana	14–7
27	November 11, 1922	Missoula, MT	Montana	7–6
28	November 17, 1923	Bozeman, MT	Montana	24–13
29	November 28, 1925	Missoula, MT	Montana	28–7
30	October 23, 1926	Butte, MT	Montana	27–0
31	November 19, 1927	Butte, MT	Montana	6–0
32	October 27, 1928	Butte, MT	Tie	0–0
33	October 19, 1929	Butte, MT	Montana State	14–12
34	October 18, 1930	Butte, MT	Montana	13–6
35	October 31, 1931	Butte, MT	Montana	37–6
36	October 22, 1932	Butte, MT	Montana State	10–7
37	November 4, 1933	Butte, MT	Montana	32–0
38	November 10, 1934	Butte, MT	Montana	25–0
39	October 5, 1935	Butte, MT	Montana	20–0
40	October 24, 1936	Butte, MT	Montana	27–0
41	October 30, 1937	Butte, MT	Montana	19–0
42	November 12, 1938	Butte, MT	Montana	13–0
43	October 14, 1939	Butte, MT	Montana	6–0
44	October 19, 1940	Butte, MT	Montana	6–0
45	October 25, 1941	Butte, MT	Montana	23–13
46	October 19, 1946	Butte, MT	Montana	20–7
47	October 18, 1947	Butte, MT	Montana State	13–12
48	October 16, 1948	Butte, MT	Montana	14–0
49	October 29, 1949	Butte, MT	Montana	34–12
50	October 21, 1950	Butte, MT	Montana	33–0
51	October 20, 1951	Bozeman, MT	Montana	38–0
52	November 1, 1952	Missoula, MT	Montana	35–12
53	November 7, 1953	Bozeman, MT	Montana	32–13
54	November 13, 1954	Missoula, MT	Montana	25–12
55	November 5, 1955	Bozeman, MT	Montana	19–0
56	November 3, 1956	Missoula, MT	Montana State	33–14
57	November 9, 1957	Bozeman, MT	Montana State	22–13
58	November 5, 1958	Missoula, MT	Montana State	20–6
59	November 7, 1959	Bozeman, MT	Montana State	40–6
60	November 5, 1960	Missoula, MT	Montana	10–6
61	November 11, 1961	Bozeman, MT	Montana State	10–9
62	November 10, 1962	Missoula, MT	Montana	36–19
63	November 9, 1963	Bozeman, MT	Montana State	18–3
64	November 7, 1964	Missoula, MT	Montana State	30–6

No.	Date	Location	Winner	Score
65	November 6, 1965	Bozeman, MT	Montana State	24–7
66	November 5, 1966	Missoula, MT	No. 3 Montana State	38–0
67	November 4, 1967	Bozeman, MT	Montana State	14–8
68	November 2, 1968	Missoula, MT	Montana State	29–24
69	November 1, 1969	Bozeman, MT	No. 3 Montana	7–6
70	November 7, 1970	Missoula, MT	No. 2 Montana	35–0
71	November 6, 1971	Bozeman, MT	Montana	30–0
72	November 4, 1972	Missoula, MT	Montana State	21–3
73	October 20, 1973	Bozeman, MT	Montana State	33–7
74	November 2, 1974	Missoula, MT	Montana State	43–29
75	October 25, 1975	Bozeman, MT	Montana State	20–3
76	October 30, 1976	Missoula, MT	No. 4 Montana State	21–12
77	October 29, 1977	Bozeman, MT	Montana State	24–19
78	November 4, 1978	Missoula, MT	Montana	24–8
79	November 3, 1979	Bozeman, MT	Montana State	38–21
80	November 1, 1980	Missoula, MT	Montana State	24–7
81	October 31, 1981	Bozeman, MT	No. 10 Montana	27–17
82	October 30, 1982	Missoula, MT	Montana	45–15
83	October 29, 1983	Bozeman, MT	Montana State	28–8
84	November 3, 1984	Missoula, MT	No. 15 Montana State	34–24
85	October 26, 1985	Bozeman, MT	Montana State	41–18
86	October 25, 1986	Missoula, MT	Montana	59–28
87	October 31, 1987	Bozeman, MT	Montana	55–7
88	November 5, 1988	Missoula, MT	No. 20 Montana	17–3
89	November 4, 1989	Bozeman, MT	No. 9 Montana	17–2
90	October 27, 1990	Missoula, MT	No. 14 Montana	35–18
91	November 2, 1991	Bozeman, MT	Montana	16–9
92	October 24, 1992	Missoula, MT	Montana	29–17
93	November 13, 1993	Bozeman, MT	No. 5 Montana	42–30
94	November 19, 1994	Missoula, MT	No. 11 Montana	55–20
95	November 18, 1995	Bozeman, MT	No. 9 Montana	42–33
96	November 23, 1996	Missoula, MT	No. 2 Montana	35–14
97	November 22, 1997	Bozeman, MT	No. 11 Montana	27–25
98	November 21, 1998	Missoula, MT	No. 20 Montana	28–21
99	November 20, 1999	Bozeman, MT	No. 7 Montana	49–3
100	November 18, 2000	Missoula, MT	No. 1 Montana	28–3
101	November 17, 2001	Bozeman, MT	No. 1 Montana	38–27
102	November 23, 2002	Missoula, MT	Montana State	10–7
103	November 22, 2003	Bozeman, MT	Montana State	27–20
104	November 20, 2004	Missoula, MT	No. 7 Montana	38–22
105	November 19, 2005	Bozeman, MT	No. 22 Montana State	16–6
106	November 18, 2006	Missoula, MT	No. 2 Montana	13–7
107	November 17, 2007	Bozeman, MT	No. 3 Montana	41–20
108	November 22, 2008	Missoula, MT	No. 5 Montana	35–3
109	November 21, 2009	Bozeman, MT	No. 1 Montana	33–19
110	November 20, 2010	Missoula, MT	No. 14 Montana State	21–16
111	November 19, 2011	Bozeman, MT	No. 7 Montana†	36–10
112	November 17, 2012	Missoula, MT	No. 2 Montana State	16–7
113	November 23, 2013	Bozeman, MT	No. 5 Montana	28–14
114	November 22, 2014	Missoula, MT	No. 13 Montana	34–7
115	November 21, 2015	Bozeman, MT	No. 17 Montana	54–35
116	November 19, 2016	Missoula, MT	Montana State	24–17
117	November 18, 2017	Bozeman, MT	Montana State	31–23
118	November 17, 2018	Missoula, MT	No. 25 Montana State	29–25
119	November 23, 2019	Bozeman, MT	No. 8 Montana State	48–14
120	November 20, 2021	Missoula, MT	No. 7 Montana	29–10
121	November 19, 2022	Bozeman, MT	No. 3 Montana State	55–21
122	November 18, 2023	Missoula, MT	No. 3 Montana	37–7
123	November 23, 2024	Bozeman, MT	No. 2 Montana State	34–11
124	November 22, 2025	Missoula, MT	No. 3 Montana State	31–28
125	December 20, 2025‡	Bozeman, MT	No. 2 Montana State	48–23
126	November 21, 2026	Bozeman, MT	No. 2 Montana State	42–16
Series: Montana leads 74–46–5
† Vacated by Montana ‡ FCS playoff game

== Coaching records ==
Since 1946

=== Montana ===
Head coach	Team	Games	Seasons	Wins	Losses	Ties	Pct.
Doug Fessenden	Montana	3	1946–1948	2	1	0	.667
Ted Shipkey	Montana	3	1949–1951	3	0	0	1.000
Ed Chinske	Montana	3	1952–1954	3	0	0	1.000
Jerry Williams	Montana	3	1955–1957	1	2	0	.333
Ray Jenkins	Montana	6	1958–1963	2	4	0	.333
Hugh Davidson	Montana	3	1964–1966	3	0	0	1.000
Jack Swarthout	Montana	9	1967–1975	3	6	0	.333
Gene Carlson	Montana	4	1976–1979	1	3	0	.250
Larry Donovan	Montana	6	1980–1985	2	4		.333
Don Read	Montana	10	1986–1995	10	0		1.000
Mick Dennehy	Montana	4	1996–1999	4	0		1.000
Joe Glenn	Montana	3	2000–2002	2	1		.667
Bobby Hauck (a)	Montana	7	2003–2009	5	2		.714
Robin Pflugrad	Montana	2	2010–2011	1	1		.500
Mick Delaney	Montana	3	2012–2014	2	1		.667
Bob Stitt	Montana	3	2015–2017	1	2		.333
Bobby Hauck (b)	Montana	8	2018–2025	2	6		.250
Bobby Kennedy	Montana	1	2026	0	1		.000

=== Montana State ===
Head coach	Team	Games	Seasons	Wins	Losses	Ties	Pct.
Clyde Carpenter	Montana State	4	1946–1948	1	3	0	.250
John H. Mason	Montana State	2	1950–1951	0	2	0	.000
Tony Storti	Montana State	5	1952–1957	2	3	0	.400
Wally Lemm	Montana State	1	1955	0	1	0	.000
Herb Agocs	Montana State	5	1958–1962	3	2	0	.600
Jim Sweeney	Montana State	5	1963–1967	5	0	0	1.000
Tom Parac	Montana State	3	1968–1970	1	2	0	.333
Sonny Holland	Montana State	7	1971–1977	6	1	0	.857
Sonny Lubick	Montana State	4	1978–1981	2	2	0	.500
Doug Graber	Montana State	1	1982	0	1		.000
Dave Arnold	Montana State	4	1983–1986	3	1		.750
Earle Solomonson	Montana State	5	1987–1991	0	5		.000
Cliff Hysell	Montana State	8	1992–1999	0	8		.000
Mike Kramer	Montana State	7	2000–2006	3	4		.429
Rob Ash	Montana State	9	2007–2015	2	7		.222
Jeff Choate	Montana State	4	2016–2019	4	0		1.000
Brent Vigen	Montana State	7	2021–2026	5	2		.714

- Last tie was in 1928 and the Big Sky enacted overtime for conference games in 1980;
  all Division I games went to overtime in 1996 (none in this series through 2025).

== See also ==
- List of NCAA college football rivalry games
- List of most-played college football series in NCAA Division I
