= Aluminum Bowl =

Aluminum Bowl (defunct)
- 1956 NAIA Championship Game
- Stadium: War Memorial Stadium
- Location: Little Rock, Arkansas
- Operated: 1956

The Aluminum Bowl was a one-time postseason college football bowl game held in 1956 as the National Association of Intercollegiate Athletics (NAIA) championship game. It featured the Montana State University-Bozeman and St. Joseph's College. Montana State had finished the season with a perfect 8–0 record, including the first "Brawl of the Wild" victory in Missoula over Montana since 1902.

The game took place at 2 p.m. EST on December 22, 1956, at War Memorial Stadium in Little Rock, Arkansas. It was televised on CBS and 5,000 fans attended in person. The playing field was mud-logged and the game was a defensive ground battle, with each goal line threatened just once. Montana State player Ron Warzeka tackled Saint Joseph's fullback Mike Murphy on the 16-yard line after a long rushing attempt. Later, Warzeka missed a field goal attempt. The Bobcats attempted only two passes, with one intercepted and the other falling incomplete. The Pumas attempted only one pass, and it was also incomplete. Montana State gained 225 rushing yards on 45 carries, and Saint Joseph's gained 153 yards on 49 carries. The final result was a scoreless tie, and the teams were named NAIA co-champions for the 1956 season.

== Results ==
Date played	Location	Team		Team		Attendance	Notes
December 22, 1956	Little Rock, Arkansas	Montana State	0	St. Joseph's (IN)	0	8,000	notes
