= Jerry Selinger =

Canadian gridiron football player (1935–2017)

Profile
- Positions: Centre, Linebacker

Personal information
- Born: July 17, 1935; Weyburn, Saskatchewan, Canada
- Died: June 16, 2017 (aged 81); Hamilton, Ontario, Canada
- Listed height: 6 ft 0 in (1.83 m)
- Listed weight: 215 lb (98 kg)

Career information
- College: St. Joseph´s (Ind.)

Career history
- 1957–1969: Ottawa Rough Riders

Awards and highlights
- Grey Cup champion (1960, 1968, 1969); National (NAIA) champion (1956)

Jerome Selinger (July 17, 1935 - June 16, 2017) was a Canadian professional football player who played for the Ottawa Rough Riders. He won the Grey Cup with them in 1960, 1968 and 1969. He played college football at St. Joseph's College in Indiana, winning a national title as a member of the Pumas' 1956 squad.
