= Herb Agocs =

American sports associate professor, coach, and player (1928–1990)

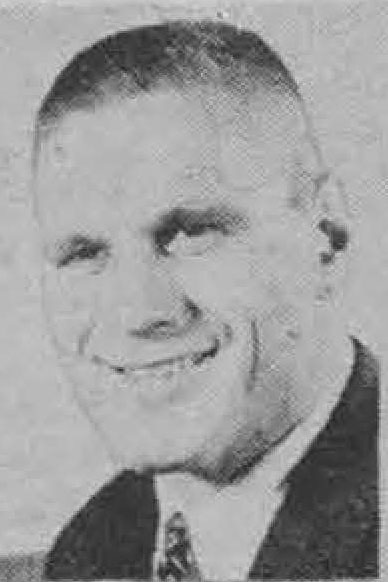

Biographical details
- Born: November 6, 1928; Pennsylvania, U.S.
- Died: September 15, 1990 (aged 61); Bozeman, Montana, U.S.

Playing career

Football
- 1948–1950: Penn
- 1951–1952: Bainbridge
- Position: End

Coaching career (HC unless noted)

Football
- 1951–1952: Bainbridge (assistant)
- 1953: Penn (assistant)
- 1954–1955: Bainbridge
- 1956–1957: Montana State (ends)
- 1958–1962: Montana State

Track
- 1951–1953: Bainbridge (assistant)
- 1956–1958: Montana State (co-coach)

Wrestling
- 1951–1953: Bainbridge (assistant)
- 1954–1955: Bainbridge
- 1963–1970: Montana State

Head coaching record
- Overall: 30–13–2 (football, Montana State only)

Accomplishments and honors

Championships
- Wrestling; 2 Big Sky (1964–1965)

Awards
- Wrestling; 3× Big Sky Coach of the Year (1964–1966)

Herbert Richard Agocs (November 6, 1928 – September 15, 1990) was an American football, wrestling, and track and field coach, and professor of physical education. He served as the head football coach at Montana State University in Bozeman, Montana from 1958 to 1962, compiling a record of 30–13–2. Agocs was also the head wrestling coach at Montana State from 1963 to 1970, leading his teams to Big Sky Conference championships in 1964 and 1965. In addition, he coached track and taught physical education at Montana State. Agocs played college football at the University of Pennsylvania before serving at the United States Naval Training Center Bainbridge, where was a player/coach in football and coach in wrestling.

== Early life and college career ==
Agocs was a native of Bethlehem, Pennsylvania, where he earned eight varsity letters at Liberty High School. He captained the football team, won the state high jump championship and was a member of the wrestling team.

Agocs entered the University of Pennsylvania in 1947 and was an end on the Quaker's unbeaten freshman football team and captained the freshman wrestling team. As a sophomore, he was a starter on the defensive unit and booted 21 of 23 points after touchdown attempts. His point after touchdown was the difference in a 14–13 victory over Princeton.

He was on the defensive unit his junior year, but was with the offensive team his final season. Penn was one of the top Eastern elevens from 1948 from 1951. Agocs was awarded All-East, All-Ivy League and honorable mention All-American honors his final season. He graduated with a bachelor's degree in economics from the Wharton School of Business at Penn.

== Military service and coaching career ==
Agocs served at the United States Naval Training Center Bainbridge, located at Port Deposit, Maryland, from 1951 to 1953 as a football player and the assistant coach in football, wrestling and track. He captained the football team in 1951 and 1952 and was voted to the end position of the All-Navy Football team in 1952. After his honorable discharge in 1953, Agocs became head football coach of the Commodores Bainbridge football team at the age of 25. His official position was "Assistant to the Special Services officer". During the off season he served as head wrestling coach and assisted in preparing an inter-command athletic program.

In 1956, Agocs moved to Bozeman, Montana to become the ends coach for the football team at Montana State University. He was promoted to head football coach in 1958 and had a 30–13–2 record for five seasons leading the Montana State Bobcats football program. Agocs coached Bobcats players who ranked as some of the Bobcat's greats such as Sonny Holland and George Marinkovich. Agocs stepped down from his post as head football coach in 1963 to concentrate on academic matters and handle the wrestling program.

Agocs was head coach of Montana State's wrestling team 1963 to 1970, leading his squads to Big Sky Conference titles in 1964 and 1965. His teams never lost a dual match during a three-season span from 1964 to 1966. In 1966, Montana State won the Big Sky tournament, claiming nine of the eleven weight classes. He was named Big Sky Conference Wrestling Coach of the Year. Agocs was also an active wrestling official in Montana and helped organize the Coaches and Officials Association.

== Late life and death ==
In 1968, Agocs was diagnosed with Hodgkins disease which was treated with cobalt therapy. During that same year, he became the coordinator of Montana State's physical education ski program. In 1979, Agocs took a leave of absence from Montana State and relocated to Winter Park, Colorado, to become a professional member of the Colorado Handicapped Ski Program.

Agocs died of cancer, at his home in Bozeman, on September 15, 1990.

== Head coaching record ==
=== Football ===
Year	Team	Overall	Conference	Standing	Bowl/playoffs
Montana State Bobcats (NCAA College Division independent) (1958–1962)
1958	Montana State	8–1			
1959	Montana State	6–3			
1960	Montana State	5–3–1			
1961	Montana State	4–3–1			
1962	Montana State	7–3			
Montana State:		30–13–2			
Total:		30–13–2			
