= 1954 Montana State Bobcats football team =

American college football season

1954 Montana State Bobcats football

RMC champion
- Conference: Rocky Mountain Conference
- Record: 8–1 (6–0 RMC)
- Head coach: Tony Storti (3rd season)
- Home stadium: Gatton Field

1954 Rocky Mountain Conference football standings
	Conf.					Overall
Team	W		L		T	W		L		T
Montana State $	6	–	0	–	0	8	–	1	–	0
Western State (CO)	7	–	1	–	0	9	–	1	–	0
Idaho State	3	–	3	–	0	4	–	4	–	0
Colorado Mines	4	–	4	–	0	4	–	5	–	0
Colorado State–Greeley	1	–	6	–	1	1	–	7	–	1
Colorado College	0	–	7	–	1	1	–	8	–	1
$ – Conference champion

The 1954 Montana State Bobcats football team was an American football team that represented Montana State University in the Rocky Mountain Conference (RMC) during the 1954 college football season. In its third season under head coach Tony Storti, the team compiled an 8–1 record (6–0 against RMC opponents) and won the Rocky Mountain Conference championship.

== Schedule ==
Date	Opponent	Site	Result	Attendance	Source
September 18	at Lewis & Clark*	Griswold Stadium; Portland, OR	W 25–6	3,000	
September 25	Colorado Mines	Gatton Field; Bozeman, MT	W 14–9		
October 2	at Idaho State	Spud Bowl; Pocatello, ID	W 39–20		
October 9	Colorado College^{†}	Gatton Field; Bozeman, MT	W 34–6	4,000	
October 16	at Colorado State–Greeley	Jackson Field; Greeley, CO	W 16–7	3,500	
October 23	Western State (CO)	Gatton Field; Bozeman, MT	W 27–6		
October 30	Idaho State	Gatton Field; Bozeman, MT	W 22–13		
November 6	North Dakota*	Gatton Field; Bozeman, MT	W 21–13		
November 13	at Montana*	Dornblaser Field; Missoula, MT (rivalry)	L 21–25	8,200	
*Non-conference game; ^{†}Homecoming
