= 1956 Saint Joseph's Pumas football team =

American college football season

1956 Saint Joseph's Pumas football

NAIA national co-champion ICC champion

Aluminum Bowl, T 0–0 vs. Montana State
- Conference: Indiana Collegiate Conference
- Record: 8–1–1 (6–0 ICC)
- Head coach: Bob Jauron (3rd season)

1956 Indiana Collegiate Conference football standings
	Conf.					Overall
Team	W		L		T	W		L		T
Saint Joseph's (IN) $^	6	–	0	–	0	8	–	1	–	1
Butler	5	–	1	–	0	6	–	2	–	0
Valparaiso	4	–	2	–	0	6	–	4	–	0
Evansville	3	–	3	–	0	4	–	5	–	0
Ball State	2	–	4	–	0	4	–	4	–	0
DePauw	1	–	5	–	0	1	–	6	–	1
Indiana State	0	–	6	–	0	2	–	6	–	0
$ – Conference champion; ^ – NAIA playoff (Aluminum Bowl) participant

The 1956 Saint Joseph's Pumas football team was an American football team that represented Saint Joseph's College of Rensselaer, Indiana as a member of the Indiana Collegiate Conference (ICC) during the 1956 college football season. In their third year under head coach Bob Jauron, the Pumas compiled an 8–1–1 record (6–0 against ICC opponents), won the ICC championship, and outscored opponents by a total of 360 to 32. Saint Joseph's tied with Montana State in the 1956 Aluminum Bowl. The two teams were declared co-winners of the 1956 NAIA football national championship.

== Schedule ==
Date	Opponent	Site	Result	Attendance	Source
September 16	at Xavier*	Xavier Stadium; Cincinnati, OH	L 8–13		
September 23	Great Lakes Navy*	Rensselaer, IN	W 29–0		
September 29	DePauw	Rensselaer, IN	W 32–0		
October 6	at Valparaiso	Valparaiso, IN	W 35–0		
October 13	Indiana State	Rensselaer, IN	W 59–13		
October 20	at Butler	Butler Bowl; Indianapolis, IN	W 31–6		
October 27	Evansville	Rensselaer, IN	W 29–0		
November 3	at Ball State	Ball State Field; Muncie, IN	W 66–0		
November 10	at Illinois-Navy Pier*	Shewbridge Field; Chicago, IL	W 71–0		
December 22	vs. Montana State*	War Memorial Stadium; Little Rock, AR (Aluminum Bowl)	T 0–0	8,000	
*Non-conference game

== Season overview ==
Saint Joseph's lost the opening game of the season to Xavier, as Xavier score the winning touchdown in the game's closing seconds. The Pumas then won the remaining eight games of the regular season, including six shut outs, and scoring 59 points against Indiana State, 66 against Ball State, and 71 against Illinois-Navy Pier.

During the regular season, the Pumas broke 15 ICC records, including the season records for most points scored, most yards gained, and fewest points and yards allowed. They tied another seven ICC season records. Defensively, the team's average of 109 yards of total offense allowed per game ranked best among all small colleges.

The Pumas were invited to play in the NAIA national championship game, then known as the Aluminum Bowl. They faced Montana State in Little Rock, Arkansas. The game ended in a scoreless tie, and the teams thus shared the 1956 NAIA national championship.

Saint Joseph's outscored opponents by a total of 360 to 32 on the season. The Pumas shut out seven of their ten opponents and limited all opponents to an average of 3.2 points per game.

== Awards and honors ==
Junior quarterback Ralph Tite was selected by the conference coaches as the most outstanding back in the ICC.

Five Saint Joseph's players were named to the first team on the All-ICC team selected by the conference's seven coaches: quarterback Ralph Tite (second consecutive year); halfback Ray Banary; end George Sherwood (unanimous choice); tackle Ken Bates; and center Jerry Selinger (unanimous choice).

Jerry Selinger later played 13 seasons in the Canadian Football League, winning three Grey Cup championships.
