= George Marinkovich =

American football player and coach (1928–2022)

Biographical details
- Born: December 8, 1928; Pennsylvania, U.S.
- Died: December 7, 2022 (aged 93); Bethlehem, Pennsylvania, U.S.

Playing career

Football
- 1948–1949: Rutgers
- 1950: Bethlehem Bulldogs
- 1956–1957: Montana State
- Positions: Quarterback, halfback

Coaching career (HC unless noted)

Football
- 1960–1967: Montana State (assistant)
- 1968: Montana Western

Baseball
- 1961–1966: Montana State

Head coaching record
- Overall: 3–4 (football)

George T. Marinkovich (December 8, 1928 – December 7, 2022) was an American football player and coach of football and baseball. He served as the head football coach at Western Montana College—now known as the University of Montana Western—for one season, in 1968, compiling a record of 3–4. Marinkovich played college football at both Rutgers University and Montana State University, winning an NAIA Football National Championship at the latter as a member of the 1956 Montana State Bobcats football team. Marinkovich died in Bethlehem, Pennsylvania on December 7, 2022, one day before his 94th birthday.

== Head coaching record ==
=== Football ===
Year	Team	Overall	Conference	Standing	Bowl/playoffs
Western Montana Bulldogs (Frontier Conference) (1969)
1968	Western Montana	3–4	3–2	3rd	
Western Montana:		3–4	3–2		
Total:		3–4			
