= 1956 Montana State Bobcats football team =

American college football season

1956 Montana State Bobcats football

NAIA national co-champion RMC champion

Aluminum Bowl, T 0–0 vs. Saint Joseph's (IN)
- Conference: Rocky Mountain Conference
- Record: 9–0–1 (5–0 RMC)
- Head coach: Tony Storti (4th season)
- Home stadium: Gatton Field

1956 Rocky Mountain Conference football standings
	Conf.					Overall
Team	W		L		T	W		L		T
Montana State $^	5	–	0	–	0	9	–	0	–	1
Idaho State	3	–	2	–	0	6	–	3	–	0
Colorado State–Greeley	3	–	2	–	0	5	–	4	–	0
Western State (CO)	3	–	2	–	0	5	–	5	–	0
Colorado College	1	–	4	–	0	2	–	7	–	0
Colorado Mines	0	–	5	–	0	2	–	7	–	0
$ – Conference champion; ^ – NAIA playoff participant

The 1956 Montana State Bobcats football team was an American football team that represented Montana State University in the Rocky Mountain Conference (RMC) during the 1956 college football season. In its fourth season under head coach Tony Storti, the team compiled a 9–0–1, won the RMC championship, tied with Saint Joseph's (IN) in the Aluminum Bowl, and was recognized as the national champion in NAIA.

The team excelled on both offense and defense. On offense, the 1956 Bobcats averaged 323.1 rushing yards per game, a total that remains a program record. On defense, the team gave up 9.1 points per game, a total that was the lowest in program history until the 1976 team limited opponents to 8.1 points per game.

Storti's assistant coaches were Joe Berry (line), Herb Agocs (ends), and Gene Bourdet (backs).

Don Edwards and Jim Posewitz were co-winners of the team's most valuable player award.

Tackle Ron Warzeka was selected as a second-team player on the Little All-America team. He went on to play for the Oakland Raiders in the American Football League.

Several Bobcats were named to the All-Rocky Mountain Conference football teams selected by the Associated Press (AP) and United Press International (UPI). They are: Warzeka (AP-1; UPI-1); R Ed Ritt (AP-1; UPI-1); fullback Don Edwards (AP-1; UPI-1); center Sonny Holland (AP-1; UPI-1); quarterback Dave Alt (AP-1; UPI-1); end Jim Posewitz (UPI-2); end Bob Black (UPI-HM); guard Herb Roberts (UPI-HM); guard Charley Jackson (UPI-HM); and halfback George Marinkovich (UPI-HM).

== Schedule ==
Date	Opponent	Site	Result	Attendance	Source
September 15	vs. South Dakota State*	Memorial Stadium; Great Falls, MT	W 33–14		
September 22	at North Dakota*	Memorial Stadium; Grand Forks, ND	W 33–13		
September 29	at Colorado College	Washburn Field; Colorado Springs, CO	W 30–14		
October 6	Colorado Mines	Gatton Field; Bozeman, MT	W 62–0		
October 12	at Colorado State–Greeley	Jackson Field; Greeley, CO	W 13–0		
October 20	Idaho State^{†}	Gatton Field; Bozeman, MT	W 26–6		
October 27	Western State (CO)	Gatton Field; Bozeman, MT	W 28–13	2,000	
November 3	at Montana*	Dornblaser Field; Missoula, MT (rivalry)	W 33–14		
November 17	Whitworth*	Gatton Field; Bozeman, MT	W 54–0	4,000	
December 22	vs. Saint Joseph's (IN)*	War Memorial Stadium; Little Rock, AR (Aluminum Bowl)	T 0–0	8,000	
*Non-conference game; ^{†}Homecoming; Source:
