= Montana State Bobcats football =

Football program of Montana State University

2026 Montana State Bobcats football team
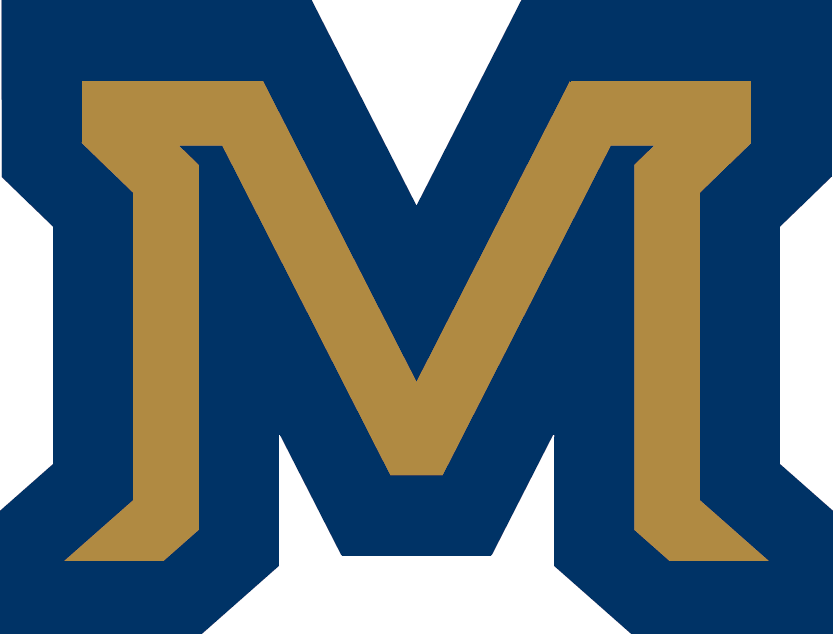
- First season: 1897; 129 years ago
- Athletic director: Leon Costello
- Head coach: Brent Vigen; 6th season, 71–13 (.845)
- Location: Bozeman, Montana
- Stadium: Bobcat Stadium (capacity: 17,777 (seating); 20,767 (total))
- Conference: Big Sky
- Colors: Blue and gold
- All-time record: 575–507–34 (.530)
- Bowl record: 3–1–2 (.667)

NCAA Division I FCS championships
- 1984, 2025

NCAA Division II championships
- 1976

NAIA national championships
- 1956

Conference championships
- RMAC: 1938, 1946, 1947, 1954, 1956 Big Sky: 1964, 1966, 1967, 1968, 1972, 1976, 1979, 1982, 1984, 2002, 2003, 2005, 2010, 2011, 2012, 2022, 2024, 2025, 2026
- Consensus All-Americans: 20
- Rivalries: Montana (rivalry)
- Fight song: Stand up and Cheer!
- Website: MSUBobcats.com

The Montana State Bobcats football program competes in the Big Sky Conference of the NCAA's Division I Football Championship Subdivision for Montana State University. The program began in 1897 and has won four national championships (1956, 1976, 1984 and 2025). It is the only college football program in the nation to win national championships on three different levels of competition, NAIA, NCAA Division II, and NCAA Division I FCS (formerly NCAA Division I-AA). Through the 2025 season, the Bobcats had played in 1,077 games with an all-time record of 548–497–32.

The first championship came in Montana State's last season in the Rocky Mountain Athletic Conference, which moved to NAIA in 1952. The national championship was the first ever for the RMAC and was also the first time the NAIA had a football champion. The Bobcats were members of the RMAC from 1917 to 1956, after being an independent from 1897 to 1916. MSC rejoined the NCAA (College Division) in 1957, and had one of its most successful runs as an independent from 1957 to 1962 with six straight winning seasons, including an 8–2 mark in 1957 and 8–1 in 1958. In 1963, Montana State became a charter member of the Big Sky Conference and has since won three national championships.

Montana State has won 23 conference titles, including 18 in the Big Sky Conference and five in the Rocky Mountain Athletic Conference. The Bobcats have won conference titles in eight of the past nine decades and have won multiple conference titles in seven of the last eight decades. MSU finished the 1926 season undefeated in RMAC conference games, but was not awarded a conference title. They have qualified for the NCAA playoffs fifteen times, once (1976) as a Division II member and fourteen times (1984, 2002, 2003, 2010, 2011, 2012, 2014, 2018, 2019, 2021, 2022, 2023, 2024 and 2025) as a Division I-AA/FCS member. Through the 2025 season, the Bobcats are 21–14–2 in postseason play.

Their primary rival are the Montana Grizzlies, whom they meet in the annual Brawl of the Wild, more commonly referred to as the "Cat-Griz" game by MSU students, alumni and supporters.

== History ==
=== 1946 ===
Before World War II, Montana State football tasted success often, but in small doses. The Bobcats did not record a winning season between 1931 and 1941, MSC's last pre-war squad. The 'Cats were 1–10 in that stretch against Montana, and were shut out for eight consecutive years. In 1946, however, things began to change. Composed of war-hardened veterans, Clyde Carpenter and the Bobcats rolled up a 5–3–1 regular season record, impressive enough to land the team its first-ever bowl bid. The Bobcats tied New Mexico, 13–13. Although it would be seven more seasons until Montana State would again win more than it lost, that season helped chart the course into what would become an unbelievably successful period in Montana State's football history as the Bobcats would take 22 of the next 30 games from 1956 to 1985 from the Grizzlies and would win three national championships during that same span.

The 1946 team was special for more than its accomplishments, however. When it reassembled following World War II, its special mission was to carry the Bobcat banner after 14 members of Montana State's previous team, the 1941 squad, were killed during World War II. The only pre-war regular to play in the Harbor Bowl was Bill Zupan, whose brother Al was among those 'Cat gridders making the ultimate sacrifice. Others were Orin Beller, Newell Berg, Dana Bradford, John Burke, Bernard Cluzen, William Coey, Karl Fye, John Hall, Joseph McGeever, John Phelan, Richard Roman, Wendell Scabad and Alton Zempel, according to the outstanding centennial history of MSU, "In the People's Interest".

=== 1956 ===
In 1956, the Bobcats, led by freshman captain and two-way (center and middle linebacker) starter Sonny Holland, won a share of the NAIA title at the Aluminum Bowl in Little Rock, Arkansas, playing to a scoreless tie with the Pumas of St. Joseph's College from Rensselaer, Indiana. The game was nationally aired on CBS television and radio. It was played on a rain-soaked field that thwarted MSU's offense, which had run for an average of 323.1 yards rushing and 31.2 points per game. The championship was the first for the Rocky Mountain Athletic Conference and the 1956 Montana State football team is a member of the RMAC Hall of Fame. The 1956 Bobcats of head coach Tony Storti were the fourth, and last, Montana State football team to go undefeated. The game is the only blemish on the record of the team as it finished at 9–0–1.

=== 1964 ===
Behind head coach Jim Sweeney in 1964, Montana State won the NCAA Western Regional College Division Championship, which existed from 1964 to 1972, with a 28–7 win over Sacramento State in what was also known as the Camellia Bowl. The NCAA Western Regional was one of four regionals that led up to the selection of the NCAA College Division champion by poll. However, neither MSU nor any of the other regional winners—Northern Iowa (Midwest), Middle Tennessee State (Mideast), or East Carolina (East)—were awarded the national championship. That distinction went in split fashion to Los Angeles State (UPI/Coaches) and Wittenberg (AP). Upon the establishment of Division II in 1973, a full playoff system was introduced to determine the national champion. MSU is one of three Big Sky Conference schools, along with Boise State and North Dakota, to win a Camellia Bowl game. The Bobcats finished the 1964 season at 7–4.

=== 1976 ===
Montana State won the 1976 NCAA Division II championship at the Pioneer Bowl in Wichita Falls, Texas, beating the Akron Zips 24–13. The Bobcats were led by head coach Sonny Holland and sophomore quarterback Paul Dennehy. MSU led 17–0 in the third quarter before Akron cut the lead to 17–13. Running back Tom Kostrba scored from seven yards out in the fourth quarter to seal the win.

The Bobcats advanced to the championship game with a 17–16 quarterfinal win over the New Hampshire in Bozeman. The extra-point attempt to tie the game with seven minutes remaining missed wide right, and the remainder of the game was scoreless. That was followed by a 10–3 semifinal win in the Grantland Rice Bowl over North Dakota State, after trailing 3–0 at halftime on the road in Fargo. Kostrba ran for 100 yards in both playoff games and Don Ueland ran for 94 in the championship game. Montana State finished the 1976 season with ten consecutive wins and a 12–1 record; the lone loss at Fresno State came in September.

=== 1984 ===
Eight years later, the Bobcats defeated Louisiana Tech 19–6 in the Division I-AA Championship Game in Charleston, South Carolina, for their third national championship. Led by second-year head coach Dave Arnold, MSU was seeded third in the twelve-team playoffs, which meant a first-round bye and a home game in the quarterfinals, in which the Bobcats rallied from a 0–14 deficit to eliminate Arkansas State 31–14.

In the semifinals, also in Bozeman, Montana State trailed second-seeded Rhode Island 12–20 entering the fourth quarter, then scored twenty unanswered points to win 32–20. MSU took the lead on a 97-yard interception return for a touchdown by safety Joe Roberts Jr. Quarterback Kelly Bradley threw for over 300 yards in each playoff game and had eight touchdown passes in the postseason. Tight end Joe Bignell hauled in 10 passes for 130 yards and two touchdowns in the championship game.

After a 2–2 start, the Bobcats won ten straight to end at 12–2 in 1984, which followed a 1–10 season in 1983, and preceded a 2–9 record in 1985.

=== Four Titles in three divisions ===
Montana State holds the distinction of being the only college football program with national championships in three levels of college football. The Bobcats of head coach Tony Storti claimed a share of the 1956 NAIA title when it finished in a scoreless tie with St. Joseph's (Indiana). In 1976, Sonny Holland's MSU team downed Akron 24–13 for the NCAA Division II championship, and the Bobcats won the NCAA Division I-AA (FCS) championship in 1984 under Dave Arnold with a 19–6 win over Louisiana Tech. In 2025, the Bobcats won the FCS championship under Brent Vigen with a 35-34 win over Illinois State.

=== 10,000 passing; 1,000 rushing quarterbacks ===
In the history of college football, including the NAIA, there have been just 11 quarterbacks that have gone over 10,000 yards passing and 1,000 yards rushing for their career. Two of those quarterbacks were produced by Montana State. Travis Lulay accomplished the feat in 2005 when he finished with 10,746 passing and 1,459 rushing. DeNarius McGhee hit those milestones on consecutive weeks in 2013 when he went over 1,000 rushing against Northern Arizona, then hit 10,000 passing against Weber State. He finished his career with 1,133 yards rushing and 11,203 yards passing. Both quarterbacks began playing their freshman season at Montana State. Lulay started the sixth game of his freshman year against Idaho State. After a 2–4 start, he led the Bobcats to the Big Sky regular season championship and their first trip to the playoffs in 18 years. McGhee started the first game of his frosh season and has only missed two games – both in his senior year. He led MSU to Big Sky titles and the FCS playoffs the first three years of his career.

=== Back-to-back Bucks ===
MSU is one of just three schools to have repeat winners of the Buck Buchanan Award, which is given out annually by The Sports Network to the most outstanding defensive player in the Football Championship Subdivision.

In 2012 Caleb Schreibeis became the first Bobcat to win the award followed by Brad Daly in 2013. Both players manned the defensive end (Bandit) position for MSU and racked up big numbers playing in defensive line coach Bo Beck's system.

The two players took completely different routes to the award as Schreibeis, a walk-on out of Billings West, didn't get on the list until the last week of the season and Daly, a highly touted prospect out of Helena Capital, was on the list all season.

=== The Miracle in Missoula ===
On November 17, 2018, at approximately 3:19 in the afternoon at Washington-Grizzly Stadium in Missoula with Montana State clinging to a 29–25 lead after rallying from a 22–0 deficit and rival Montana sitting within one foot of the Bobcats goal line with 14 seconds to play, defensive tackle Tucker Yates of Colstrip, Mont. jarred the ball loose from UM's Adam Eastwood and Grant Collins of Bozeman, Mont. sent the ball rolling into the UM backfield where Derek Marks of Belgrade, Mont. pounced on the ball to seal the win for the Bobcats. MSU's other defensive tackle Chase Benson of Helena, Mont. knocked his man so far into the UM backfield that Eastwood had to alter his course causing him to collide with Yates. Bobcat fans have since referred to the play as The Stuff or The Montana Stuff in reference to the four Montana natives who played key roles in the play.

Earlier in the quarter Collins had forced and recovered a fumble in UM territory to set up the go-ahead touchdown. The Bobcats trailed by 15 points in the fourth quarter and outscored the Grizzlies 29–3 after falling behind 22–0. The overall comeback is the greatest in Cat-Griz Game history and the fourth quarter comeback matched the comeback from a 24–9 deficit by the 1968 Bobcats, which ended in a 29–24 win over UM.

== Conference affiliations ==
- Independent (1897–1916, 1957–1962)
- Rocky Mountain Athletic Conference (1917–1956)
- Big Sky Conference (1963–present)

== Championships ==
=== National championships ===
Season	Division	Coach	Overall record	Score	Opponent
1956	NAIA	Tony Storti	9–0–1	T 0–0	St. Joseph's (IN) Pumas
1976	Division II	Sonny Holland	12–1	W 24–13	Akron Zips
1984	Division I-AA	Dave Arnold	12–2	W 19–6	Louisiana Tech Bulldogs
2025	Division I-FCS	Brent Vigen	14–2	W 35–34 ^{OT}	Illinois State Redbirds

=== Conference championships ===
Montana State has won 24 (five in the Rocky Mountain Athletic Conference (per RMAC website); 19 in the Big Sky Conference) conference championships through the 2026 season.

Season	Conference	Coach	Overall record	Conference record
1938	Rocky Mountain	Schubert R. Dyche	3–5–1	1–0–1
1946	Rocky Mountain	Clyde Carpenter	5–3–2	2–0–1
1947	Rocky Mountain	Clyde Carpenter	4–5	1–0
1954	Rocky Mountain	Tony Storti	8–1	6–0
1956	Rocky Mountain	Tony Storti	9–0–1	5–0
1964	Big Sky Conference	Jim Sweeney	7–4	3–0
1966	Big Sky Conference	Jim Sweeney	8–3	4–0
1967	Big Sky Conference	Jim Sweeney	7–3	4–0
1968†	Big Sky Conference	Tom Parac	6–4	3–1
1972	Big Sky Conference	Sonny Holland	8–3	5–1
1976	Big Sky Conference	Sonny Holland	12–1	6–0
1979	Big Sky Conference	Sonny Lubick	6–4	6–1
1982†	Big Sky Conference	Doug Graber	6–5	5–2
1984	Big Sky Conference	Dave Arnold	12–2	6–1
2002†	Big Sky Conference	Mike Kramer	7–6	5–2
2003†	Big Sky Conference	Mike Kramer	7–6	5–2
2005†	Big Sky Conference	Mike Kramer	7–4	5–2
2010†	Big Sky Conference	Rob Ash	9–3	7–1
2011‡	Big Sky Conference	Rob Ash	10–3	7–1
2012†	Big Sky Conference	Rob Ash	11–2	7–1
2022†	Big Sky Conference	Brent Vigen	12–2	8–0
2024	Big Sky Conference	Brent Vigen	15–1	8–0
2025	Big Sky Conference	Brent Vigen	14–2	8–0
2026	Big Sky Conference	Brent Vigen	10–1	7–1

† Co-champions
‡ Montana and Montana State tied for the 2011 championship, which Montana subsequently vacated

== Postseason results ==
=== Bowl results ===
Date	Bowl	Opponent	Result	Notes
January 1, 1947	Harbor Bowl	New Mexico	T, 13–13	
December 22, 1956	Aluminum Bowl	St. Joseph's	T, 0–0	NAIA final
December 12, 1964	Camellia Bowl	Sacramento State	W, 28–7	NCAA College Division Western final
December 10, 1966	Camellia Bowl	San Diego State	L, 7–28	NCAA College Division Western final
December 4, 1976	Grantland Rice Bowl	North Dakota State	W, 10–3	NCAA Division II semifinal
December 11, 1976	Pioneer Bowl	Akron	W, 24–13	NCAA Division II final

=== NCAA Division II playoff results ===
Season	Round	Opponent	Result	Head Coach
1976	Quarterfinal; Semifinal; Final	New Hampshire @ North Dakota State; Akron	W, 17–16; W, 10–3; W, 24–13	Sonny Holland

=== NCAA Division I FCS playoff results ===
NCAA Division I FCS playoff results (known as "Division I-AA" from 1978 through 2005)

The Bobcats have made fifteen appearances in the Division I-AA/FCS playoffs, with an overall record of 21–13. They've won two national championships (1984, 2025) and are two time national runner-ups (2021, 2024).

Season	Round	Opponent	Result	Head Coach
1984	Quarterfinal; Semifinal; Final	Arkansas State; Rhode Island vs. Louisiana Tech^{†}	W, 31–14; W, 32–20; W, 19–6	Dave Arnold
2002	First Round	@ McNeese State	L, 14–21	Mike Kramer
2003	First Round	@ Northern Iowa	L, 14–35	Mike Kramer
2006	First Round; Quarterfinal	Furman @ Appalachian State	W, 31–13; L, 17–38	Mike Kramer
2010	Second Round	North Dakota State	L, 17–42	Rob Ash
2011	Second Round; Quarterfinal	New Hampshire @ Sam Houston State	W, 26–25; L, 13–49	Rob Ash
2012	Second Round; Quarterfinal	Stony Brook; Sam Houston State	W, 16–10; L, 16–34	Rob Ash
2014	First Round	South Dakota State	L, 40–47	Rob Ash
2018	First Round; Second Round	Incarnate Word @ North Dakota State	W, 35–14; L, 10–52	Jeff Choate
2019	Second Round; Quarterfinal; Semifinal	Albany; Austin Peay @ North Dakota State	W, 47–21; W, 24–10; L, 14–42	Jeff Choate
2021	Second Round; Quarterfinal; Semifinal; Final	UT Martin @ Sam Houston State; South Dakota State vs. North Dakota State^{†}	W, 26–7; W, 42–19; W, 31–17; L, 10–38	Brent Vigen
2022	Second Round; Quarterfinal; Semifinal	Weber State; William & Mary @ South Dakota State	W, 33–25; W, 55–7; L, 18–39	Brent Vigen
2023	Second Round	North Dakota State	L, 34–35 ^{OT}	Brent Vigen
2024	Second Round; Quarterfinal; Semifinal; Final	UT Martin; Idaho; South Dakota vs. North Dakota State^{†}	W, 49–17; W, 52–19; W, 31–17; L, 32–35	Brent Vigen
2025	Second Round; Quarterfinal; Semifinal; Final	Yale; Stephen F. Austin; Montana vs. Illinois State^{†}	W, 21–13; W, 44–28; W, 48–23; W, 35–34 ^{OT}	Brent Vigen

† 1984 final on neutral site at Johnson Hagood Stadium in Charleston, South Carolina
2021 and 2024 final on neutral site at Toyota Stadium in Frisco, Texas
2025 final on neutral site at FirstBank Stadium in Nashville, Tennessee

== Head coaches ==
Years	Coach	Seasons	Record	Pct.
1897	Charles J. Lisle	1	1–3	.250
1898	George Ahern	1	0–2	.000
1899	W. J. Adams	1	3–0	1.000
1900	Eugene C. Woodruff	1	2–1	.667
1901–05	A. G. Harbaugh	2	3–3–1	.500
1902–1903	J. E. Flynn	2	5–0–2	.857
1904	Fred Ervin	1	2–1	.667
1908–1910	John H. McIntosh	3	5–10–5	.375
1911–1912	Earnest A. Dockstader	2	0–4–1	.100
1913	Eugene F. Bunker	1	2–2	.500
1914–1917	Fred Bennion	4	11–7–5	.587
1919	Walter D. Powell	1	1–3–1	.300
1920–1921	D. V. Graves	2	5–5–1	.500
1922–1927	Ott Romney	6	28–20–1	.582
1928–1941	Schubert R. Dyche	12	36–53–7	.411
1936–1937	Jack Croft	2	6–9–1	.406
1946–1949	Clyde Carpenter	4	13–20–2	.400
1950–1951	John H. Mason	2	1–15	.063
1955	Wally Lemm	1	4–4–1	.500
1952–1957	Tony Storti	5	31–12–1	.716
1958–1962	Herb Agocs	5	30–13–2	.689
1963–1967	Jim Sweeney	5	31–20	.608
1968–1970	Tom Parac	3	9–20	.310
1971–1977	Sonny Holland	7	47–27–1	.633
1978–1981	Sonny Lubick	4	21–19	.525
1982	Doug Graber	1	6–5	.545
1983–1986	Dave Arnold	4	18–29	.383
1987–1991	Earle Solomonson	5	15–40	.273
1992–1999	Cliff Hysell	8	41–47	.466
2000–2006	Mike Kramer	7	40–43	.482
2007–2015	Rob Ash	9	70–38	.648
2016–2020	Jeff Choate	4	28–22	.560
2021–present	Brent Vigen	5	61–12	.836

== Rivalries ==
=== Montana ===
The Brawl of the Wild is the game between MSU and their primary rival, the University of Montana Grizzlies. Both teams play for The Great Divide Trophy. As of 2016, Montana holds a healthy 73–42–5 lead in the series, but the series has been tight since 1956 with UM holding just a 33–32 lead; however, there was a notable losing record in the 1990s where MSU failed to win a single game.

The series has three distinct periods. From 1897 to 1916 the teams didn't belong to a conference and at times would play twice per year. Early seasons had seven games or less with one season seeing the Grizzlies play just one game. Four of the five ties in the series came during this era. Montana won 12 games to Montana State's 7.

In 1917 Montana State joined the Rocky Mountain Athletic Conference and in 1924 Montana joined the Pacific Coast Conference, the predecessor of today's Pac-12. The RMAC included several teams that would become Mountain West members. When MSU joined the RMAC it included Colorado, Colorado State, Utah, Utah State, and Brigham Young. The RMAC would drop down to the small college division of NCAA football in 1939 and remained there until 1952 when it joined the NAIA.

UM joined the PCC after spending 22 years as part of the Northwest Intercollegiate Athletic Association with league members Washington, Oregon, Washington State, Oregon State, Idaho and Wittman College in 1924. By then the PCC included Stanford, California, UCLA, USC, Oregon, Oregon State, Washington, Washington State, and Idaho. The Bobcats remained in the RMAC through 1956, while the Grizzlies continued in the PCC through 1949 and joined the Skyline (aka Mountain States) Conference, which also competed in the NCAA University (large) Division, from 1951 to 1961. MSU was a NAIA independent from 1957 to 1962 and UM was an NCAA University Division (large) independent in 1950 and 1962. During this period UM enjoyed a 30–8–1 edge in Cat-Griz games.

Both schools entered the Big Sky Conference as charter members in 1963 with Montana holding a 42–15–2 series lead, but the Bobcats winning five of the previous seven. From 1963 to 1985 Montana State enjoyed its most successful period of the Cat-Griz rivalry. MSU won 17 games to just six for UM. Following that Montana started "The Streak" when it won 16 straight games from 1986 to 2001. MSU ended the drought by winning three of four, MSU (as of 2022) leads the series 10–9 * after "The Streak." The Big Sky era shows Montana with a 31–28 lead.

Since MSU won its first national championship in 1956, the series shows UM with a 33–32 edge. Prior to that UM had a 40–10–5 advantage.

== Bobcat Stadium ==
The Bobcats play their home games at Bobcat Stadium, located at the south end of campus in Bozeman. The stadium and area around the stadium have been under vast renovations and improvements with approximately $14.3 million invested over the past five years.

In 2013, the stadium's parking lots were paved, landscaped, and had lighting installed to enhance the pre-game tailgating experience. During and following the 2011 season, stadium lighting was added and its first night game was in 2012 against Chadron State on Thursday, August 30. MSU renovated the south end zone in 2011, adding 5,277 seats to bring the official seating capacity to 17,777. The Cat-Griz game against Montana in 2022 set a stadium record with an attendance of 22,047. The new end zone seating holds over 7,200 fans. Included in the 2011 upgrades were an 18' x 37' LED video board, two scoreboards, and sound system. In 2008, the natural grass playing surface was replaced with FieldTurf. In the late fall of 2011, Montana State raised funds for stadium lighting in order to extend the hours it can practice and play night games. Seven light standards were erected around the stadium. MSU currently has plans to renovate the east grandstand to include matching sky suites of the west grandstand and erect seating in the north end zone. These additions would increase seating capacity to approximately 24,000. Fund-raising isn't expected to go public until 2015.

Prior to the 2011 addition, Bobcat Stadium was renovated in 1997 when the west grandstand was removed and replaced with a new grandstand with luxury sky suites, indoor stadium seating, press box, and club room. The north bleachers were also removed at this time and replaced with locker rooms for visitors, game officials, and an auxiliary locker room for the Bobcats. The name of the stadium was changed from Reno H. Sales Stadium to Bobcat Stadium at this time. The stadium capacity dropped from 15,000 to 12,500 due to the reconfiguration.

Reno H. Sales Stadium was erected in 1973 and replaced Gatton Field. Through the 1971 football season, the Bobcats played home games for four decades at Gatton Field. It was located directly south of the Romney Gym, across Grant Street and northeast of the Brick Breeden Fieldhouse, which opened in 1957. The playing field ran east–west and had lighting as far back as the 1940s. It was razed in early 1972 and is the site of the Marga Hosaeus Fitness Center, opened in 1973. Bobcat Stadium is approximately a half mile (0.8 km) due south.

The field was named for Cyrus J. Gatton (1894–1918), a former Montana State football player from 1913 to 1916. A native of Iowa who was raised in Bozeman, Gatton enlisted in the U.S. Army Air Service during World War I and was killed while flying for the French on November 4, 1918, just a week before the Armistice. The class of 1917 voted in 1920 that when the school built a new football field it should be named for Cyrus Gatton, and the request was honored ten years later.

MSU played its 1972 season at Bozeman High School's Van Winkle Stadium, with expanded temporary seating. Despite the temporary relocation, the Bobcats still won the Big Sky Conference title that season.

== National award winners ==
- AFCA Coach of the Year

Dave Arnold (1984) Division I-AA

- Liberty Mutual Coach of the Year

Rob Ash (2011) FCS

=== First Team All Americans ===
Montana State has seen 29 players receive First Team All-America recognition, with 22 of those earning consensus All-America status based on being selected to the first team of three or more recognized All-America teams.

In 1954, Jim Argeris became the first player selected as a first team All-America. Center Sonny Holland is the only three-time honoree and running back Don Hass the only two-time honoree. MSU had seven first team selections from 2009 to 2012, which is the most of any four-year span in school history.

In 2012, quarterback DeNarius McGhee, outside linebacker Jody Owens, and defensive end Caleb Schreibeis were selected to one or more of the various 2012 All-America first teams. McGhee is the first quarterback, Owens is the third linebacker, and Schreibeis the fifth defensive end in Montana State history to receive the honor. The 2012 season also marked the second time that the Bobcats has had three All-America selections in one season. The other time it occurred was when 1984's national championship team saw defensive end Mark Fellows, punter Dirk Nelson, and offensive tackle Bill Schmidt selected.

In 2013, Brad Daly became the seventh defensive lineman to earn All-America status. Daly joined Bill Kollar, Les Leininger, Mark Fellows, Neal Smith, Dane Fletcher, and Caleb Schreibeis. Daly also joined punter Matthew Peot as the only unanimous All-America selections in school history.

== Notable players ==
=== First Team All-Americans ===
Players		
Jim Argeris, C, 1954	Neal Smith, DL, 1997	Troy Andersen, LB, 2021(*)
Bryan Beital, QB 1991	Matthew Peot, P, 1999(*)	Tommy Mellott, QB 2024 (*)
Sonny Holland, C, 1957–59	Corey Smith, RS, 2003	
Jan Stenerud, K, 1966	Kane Ioane, S, 2003	
Don Hass, HB, 1966–67	Dusty Daws, LS, 2004	
Gary Gustafson, LB, 1970	Jeff Bolton, OL, 2005	
Bill Kollar, DT, 1973	Bobby Daly, LB, 2007	
Steve Kracher, RB, 1975	Dane Fletcher, DE, 2009	
Lester Leininger, DL, 1976	Jeff Hansen, OG, 2009	
Jon Borchardt, OT, 1978	Mike Person, OT, 2010	
Larry Rubens, OL, 1981	Jason Cunningham, K, 2010	
Mark Fellows, DE, 1984	DeNarius McGhee, QB, 2012	
Dirk Nelson, P, 1984	Jody Owens, LB, 2012	
Bill Schmidt, OT, 1984	Caleb Schreibeis, DE, 2012	
Sean Hill, CB, 1993	Brad Daly, DE, 2013(*)	

(*)unanimous selection

=== Other All-Americans ===
- Wayne Purdon, LB, 1966 (CP-2nd Team)

=== Retired numbers ===
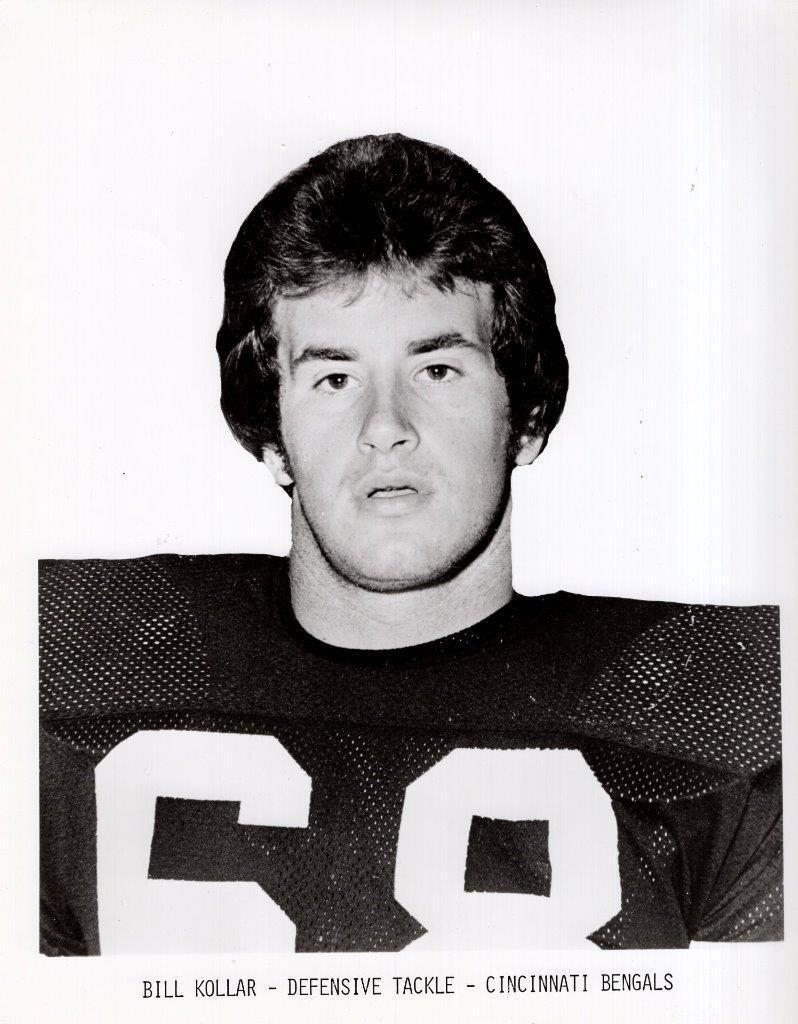
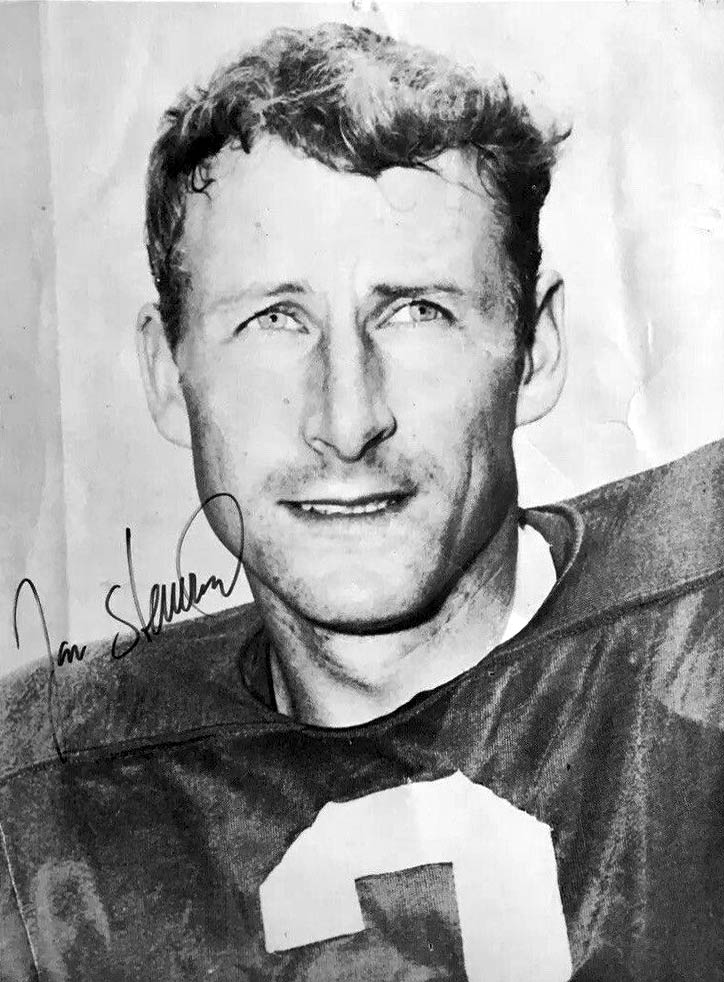
Bill Kollar (left) and Jan Stenerud are some of the players whose numbers were retired by Montana State

Montana State Bobcats retired numbers
No.	Player	Pos.	Tenure	No. ret.	Ref.
21	Don Hass	HB	1963–1966		
52	Sonny Holland	C	1956–1959	1959	
77	Bill Kollar	DT	1971–1973		
78	Jan Stenerud	K	1964–1966	1984	

Holland is considered the greatest Bobcat football player in school history. The Butte native joined the program in 1956, and starting at center as a true freshman, helped lead Montana State to its first national title when it tied St. Joseph's in the first NAIA championship game 0–0. He would earn first team All-America honors in 1957, 1958 and 1959 and is the only MSU player to do so three times. As a player, his teams never lost to rival Montana beating the Grizzlies 33–14, 22–13, 20–6, and 40–6, with Holland manning both the center and middle linebacker positions in most of those games.

Holland returned to Montana State as an assistant coach and became the head coach in 1971. After a disappointing 2–7–1 first season that included his only loss to Montana as a player or head coach, he went on to finish .500 or better in each of the next six years, and set a school record with 47 wins. After a humiliating 30–0 loss to UM in 1971, Holland's teams rattled off wins of 21–3, 33–7, 43–29, 20–3, 21–12, and 24–19 against their rivals. The highlight of his coaching career was the 1976 team, which won the NCAA Division II national championship with a 24–13 victory over the Akron Zips. In 11 games against Montana as a player and head coach Holland went 10–1 outscoring the Grizzlies 277–142. Holland's No. 52 football jersey is one of four retired by Montana State University.

A running back from 1964 to 1967 nicknamed the Iron Tumbleweed, Don Hass is one of only two players in MSU history to receive first team All-America status twice, and is the only MSU player to be named a first team NCAA All-America twice. Hass set the game (298), season (1,460), and career (2,954) rushing records for the Bobcats during his four years. His 298 yards in a single game in 1966 against Weber State is still the top single game performance in school history.

While that game stands out, his best performances were against the Grizzlies. He led them to wins in 1965 and 1966. In 1965, he ran for 100 yards for the first time in his career, and finished with 129 yards in a 24–7 win. In 1966 he ran for 142 yards in a 38–0 rout in Missoula. He ran for a Cat-Griz record 209 yards against Montana in 1967, leading the Bobcats to a 14–8 win. All told he had 480 yards rushing in three games against Montana, all wins.

The Montana State football jersey with number 21 is retired in his honor and hangs inside Bobcat Stadium.

Dennis Erickson was a MSU quarterback from 1966 to 1968. He was also a head coach in college and professional football from 1982 to 2011.

In 1968, Erickson engineered the greatest comeback, in what is considered by many as the most exciting game in the Cat-Griz series. In all, 34 points were scored in the final quarter. Erickson, flanker Ron Bain, and running back Paul Schafer led the comeback, as the Bobcats clinched a tie for the Big Sky championship—their third straight. Bain's brother, Doug of the Grizzlies, gave Montana a 17–9 lead early in the quarter on a pass from Ray Brum. After another UM touchdown made the score 24–9 with just over 10 minutes to go it looked as if the Grizzlies would win going away, but the Bobcats weren't done. Schaefer scored on a short run with 8:15 to play and Erickson hit Bain for a touchdown with five minutes left cutting the lead to two at 24–22. The Grizzlies appeared to have the winning drive stopped at the MSU 32, but a facemask penalty gave the Cats new life on the 17. Scoring 20 points in the last nine minutes, Montana State won 29–24 when Schafer, who had 58 carries for 234 yards in the game, dove into the end zone with 12 seconds left.

After Schafer's go-ahead touchdown with 12 seconds to play, the Grizzlies nearly spoiled things for MSU. After a touchback on the kickoff, UM takes over at the 20 with speedy receiver Ron Baines at quarterback. He gains 15, and another 15 are tacked on by an unnecessary roughness penalty to stop the clock with three seconds to go. Baines then makes a circus run of 37 yards from midfield before he's dragged down at the MSU 13 after time expires.

Bobcat QB Dennis Erickson was the difference. "Erickson killed us," UM head coach Jack Swarthout said.

Erickson led Montana State to three straight (1966, 1967, 1968) Big Sky Conference championships, and a spot in the 1966 College Division Western Regional (Camellia Bowl), where the Bobcats lost to the San Diego State Aztecs 28–7.

He went on to coach the Miami Hurricanes to two NCAA Division I-A national championships. He also had college head coaching stints with the Idaho Vandals, Wyoming Cowboys, Washington State Cougars, Oregon State Beavers and Arizona State Sun Devils. Professionally, he was the head coach of the NFL's Seattle Seahawks and San Francisco 49ers.

One Montana State Bobcat has been inducted into the Pro Football Hall of Fame: Jan Stenerud. After coming to MSU from Norway on a ski jumping scholarship, Stenerud starred on the varsity team, having a then-NCAA record 59-yard field goal against rival Montana in 1965. Stenerud scored 82 points as a senior in 1965. He was drafted by the Kansas City Chiefs in the third round of the AFL's 1966 draft. In 1970, he kicked a then-Super Bowl record 48-yard field goal in Kansas City's 23–7 Super Bowl IV win. He would later go on to play for the Green Bay Packers and Minnesota Vikings earning seven All-Pro and three All-AFL selections, and four trips to the Pro Bowl in his 19 seasons as a professional. He was inducted in 1991 as the first pure kicker in the Pro Football Hall of Fame. Stenerud's name is in the Kansas City Chiefs' ring of honor, and he is one of just four MSU players to have his number, "78" retired.

=== Super Bowl players ===
Seven Montana State graduates have played in a Super Bowl. The most recent is Ty Okada with the Seattle Seahawks in Super Bowl LX. Dane Fletcher, who was a linebacker for the New England Patriots, in Super Bowl XLVI. The first was Stenerud in Super Bowl IV, followed by Ron East, who played defensive tackle the following year in Super Bowl V for the Dallas Cowboys. Sam McCullum was a wide receiver for the Minnesota Vikings in Super Bowl IX against the Oakland Raiders. Running back Tony Boddie played in Super Bowl XXII for the Denver Broncos. Travis Jonsen earned a Super Bowl ring as a practice squad player for Tampa Bay. Mike Person played in Super Bowl LIV.

=== Travis Lulay ===
In 2011, quarterback Travis Lulay was named the Most Outstanding Player in the Canadian Football League and led the BC Lions to the Grey Cup title, garnering the game's Most Valuable Player award in the 34–23 win over the Winnipeg Blue Bombers. The Lions started the season 0–5 before winning 13 of their last 15 games to win the championship. Lulay threw for a league-high 32 touchdowns and passed for 4,815 yards to finish with the second best passer rating in the CFL. He also ran for 391 yards (8.3 per carry), which was good for 12th in the CFL and was the most by a quarterback.

Lulay was the quarterback at MSU from 2002 to 2005 leading the Bobcats to three Big Sky Conference titles and two NCAA Division I-AA playoff appearances. All three Big Sky Conference championships were taken in the last game of the season with wins over rival Montana. As a true freshman, Lulay engineered MSU's 10–7 win over the Grizzlies in Missoula, ending UM's 16-game winning streak over the Bobcats, and was named the Big Sky Conference's Newcomer of the Year. Lulay led Montana State in rushing his senior year with 611 yards. He left with school records for career passing yards (10,746–11th in NCAA Division I-AA history), single-season total offense, and total offense in a career. He graduated with a 3.91 GPA.

He played briefly for the Seattle Seahawks and New Orleans Saints of the NFL and also played in the NFL Europa for two seasons.

=== Bill Kollar ===
In 1974, Kollar became the first small college (non-FBS) player to win the Senior Bowl MVP, and is one of only two (Portland State's Neil Lomax being the other) small college players to win the award in that game's history. Kollar became one of just four Big Sky Conference players ever selected as an NFL first round draft choice when he was taken by the Cincinnati Bengals in 1974. He went on to play eight seasons in the NFL, including five with the Tampa Bay Buccaneers. He has been an NFL defensive line coach since 1990 and currently coaches in that capacity for the Denver Broncos. He is a member of the College Football, Senior Bowl and Montana State University Hall of Fames, and his number "77" is one of only four football numbers retired by Montana State. Don Haas, Holland and Stenerud are the others.

=== Caleb Schreibeis ===
Following the completion of the 2012 NCAA FCS regular season, Schreibeis was named the winner of Buck Buchanan Award given annually by The Sports Network to the most outstanding defensive player in the FCS. It was the first such distinction for a Montana State player. He was also a consensus All-America in 2012, the 20th Bobcat to attain that status.

Schreibeis came to Montana State as a walk-on in 2008, and after red-shirting for one season, eventually worked his way into a starting position for one game as a sophomore in 2010. He became a full-time starter in 2011 and was selected as an honorable mention to the All-Big Sky team.

The 2012 season was a breakout campaign for Schreibeis. In 10 regular-season games, the team captain collected 51 tackles and led the Big Sky with 12 sacks. He ranked first on his team in tackles for loss (14.5), quarterback hurries (seven) and forced fumbles (seven), which was also the top mark in the nation. The Bobcats also won their third straight Big Sky Conference title that season.

=== Brad Daly ===
Brad Daly garnered the 2013 Buck Buchanan Award and the FCS Athletics Directors Association Award, and is perhaps the best pure pass rusher in MSU history. Along with the two defensive player of the year awards, he was also a finalist for the Ted Hendricks Award, given to the best defensive end in all divisions of college football. He finished fifth in the final voting.

He made an immediate impact as a true-freshman, despite playing sparingly, as he recorded two sacks and blocked two kicks, leaving observers to speculate that he would have a great career. Daly left football after that season, only to return a year later with a renewed vigor.

In his sophomore year, he proved his worth by leading the Big Sky Conference with 12.5 sacks as a situational pass rusher. As a junior he became a full-time defensive end, but suffered a severely sprained ankle, and dropped to just 5.5 sacks. A year later he bounced back, despite nagging injuries, to lead the nation in sacks with 14 sacks and 20.5 tackles for loss.

For his career Daly finished with 34 sacks. He was also a unanimous first team All-America selection and the Big Sky Conference defensive player of the year as a senior. He was voted a team captain prior to his senior season, joining his father J and brother Bobby as MSU team captains and All-Americans. Bobby Daly was sixth in the 2007 Buck Buchanan Award voting.

== Bobcats in the pros ==
=== National Football League ===
- Ken Amato, Carolina Panthers (2002–2003), Tennessee Titans (2003–2011)
- Troy Andersen, Atlanta Falcons (2022–2024)
- Bob Banaugh, Minnesota Vikings (1972)
- Tony Boddie, Denver Broncos (1986–1987)
- Jon L. Borchardt, Buffalo Bills (1979–1984), Seattle Seahawks (1985–1987)
- Ron East, Dallas Cowboys (1967–1970), San Diego Chargers (1971–1973), Cleveland Browns (1975), Atlanta Falcons (1976), Seattle Seahawks (1977)
- Dane Fletcher, New England Patriots (2010–2014, 2015) Tampa Bay Buccaneers (2014)
- Daniel Hardy, Los Angeles Rams (2022), Chicago Bears (2023-2026)
- Sean Hill, Miami Dolphins (1994–1996), Detroit Lions (1997)
- Travis Jonsen, Tampa Bay Buccaneers (2020–2021) Detroit Lions (2021)
- Kevin Kassis, Seattle Seahawks (2022)
- Lewis Kidd, New Orleans Saints (2022), Indianapolis Colts (2023)
- Bill Kollar, Cincinnati Bengals (1974–1976), Tampa Bay Buccaneers (1977–1981)
- Sam McCullum, Minnesota Vikings (1974–1975, 1982–1983), Seattle Seahawks (1976–1981)
- Lance McCutcheon, Los Angeles Rams (2022), Houston Texans (2023), New York Jets (2023-2024) Pittsburgh Steelers (2024-2025) Tennessee Titans (2025)
- Mark McGrath, Seattle Seahawks (1980–1981), Washington Redskins (1983–1985)
- Tommy Mellott, Las Vegas Raiders (2025), New Orleans Saints (2025)
- Zach Minter, Chicago Bears (2013), Cincinnati Bengals (2014), Dallas Cowboys (2014)
- Ty Okada, Seattle Seahawks (2023–2026)
- Mike Person, San Francisco 49ers (2011, 2018–2020), Indianapolis Colts (2012, 2017–2018), Seattle Seahawks (2012–2013), St. Louis Rams (2013–2014), Atlanta Falcons (2015–2016), Kansas City Chiefs (2016–2017)
- Frosty Peters, Providence Steam Roller (1930), Portsmouth Spartans (1930), Brooklyn Dodgers (1931) and Chicago Cardinals (1932)
- Larry Rubens, Green Bay Packers (1982–1983), Chicago Bears (1986–1987)
- Beau Sandland, Carolina Panthers (2016), Green Bay Packers (2016–2017), Arizona Cardinals (2018), Oakland Raiders (2019)
- Alex Singleton, Seattle Seahawks (2015), New England Patriots (2015), Minnesota Vikings (2015), Philadelphia Eagles (2019–2021), Denver Broncos (2022– )
- Jan Stenerud, Kansas City Chiefs (1967–1979), Green Bay Packers (1980–1983), Minnesota Vikings (1984–1985)
- Johnathan Taylor, Detroit Lions (2002–2003), Dallas Cowboys (2004), Atlanta Falcons (2005)
- Joey Thomas, Green Bay Packers (2004–2005), New Orleans Saints (2005), Dallas Cowboys (2007), Miami Dolphins (2008–2009), Oakland Raiders (2010)
- Corey Widmer, New York Giants (1992–1999)
- Travis Lulay, Seattle Seahawks (2006, 2008), New Orleans Saints (2008)
- Mike McCleod, Green Bay Packers (1984–1985)
- Sebastian Valdez, San Francisco 49ers (2025– )

=== NFL Europe ===
- Travis Lulay, Berlin Thunder (2007)

=== American Football League ===
- Bob Cegelski, C Denver Broncos (1962)
- Curt Farrier, DT Kansas City Chiefs (1963–1965)
- Cliff Hysell, OT Denver Broncos (1966)
- Ron Warzeka, DT Oakland Raiders (1960)

=== United States Football League ===
- Tony Boddie, RB Los Angeles Express (1983–1985)
- Phil Bruneau, DT Oklahoma Outlaws (1984), Arizona Outlaws (1985)
- Jim Kalafat, LB San Antonio Gunslingers (1983)
- Larry Rubens, C Memphis Showboats (1985)

=== World Football League ===
- Ron East, DT The Hawaiians (1974)

=== United Football League ===
- Bob Cegelski, C Louisville Raiders (1962)

=== Canadian Football League ===
- Reggie Carthon, Shreveport Pirates (1995), BC Lions (1996, 1999), Winnipeg Blue Bombers (1997–1998)
- Les Kaminski, Hamilton Tiger-Cats (1984), Calgary Stampeders (1984)
- Bob Lubig, Calgary Stampeders (1978–1981, 1982–1985), Toronto Argonauts (1981), Montreal Alouettes (1986)
- Travis Lulay, BC Lions (2009–2018)
- Mike McCleod, Edmonton Eskimos (1980–1984)
- Zach Minter, BC Lions (2015), Calgary Stampeders (2016), Saskatchewan Roughriders (2017)
- Dakota Prukop, Toronto Argonauts (2017–2019), Calgary Stampeders (2020), Edmonton Elks (2021, 2024), Winnipeg Blue Bombers (2022–2023)
- Alex Singleton, Calgary Stampeders (2016–2018)
- Brian Strong, Calgary Stampeders (1983–1985), Hamilton Tiger-Cats (1986)
- Tre Webb, BC Lions (2023)
- Al Wilson, BC Lions (1972–1986)
- Harvey Wylie, Calgary Stampeders (1956–1964)

=== United Football League (2024) ===
Also includes XFL (2020–2023) and United States Football League (2022–2023) teams

- Travis Jonsen, San Antonio Brahmas (2023)
- Kevin Kassis, Seattle Sea Dragons (2023)
- Dakota Prukop, New Jersey Generals (2023)
- Callahan O'Reilly, St. Louis Battlehawks (2024–2025)
- Brendan Hall, Dallas Renegades (2026)

== Hall of Fame inductees ==
=== Pro Football Hall of Fame ===
Pro Football Hall of Fame
Name	Position	Year	Inducted	Ref
Jan Stenerud	Placekicker	1964–1965	1991	

One Montana State Bobcat has been inducted into the Pro Football Hall of Fame; Jan Stenerud. After coming to MSU from Norway on a ski jumping scholarship, Stenerud starred on the varsity team with a then-NCAA record 59-yard field goal against rival Montana and 82 points scored as a senior in 1965. He was drafted by the Kansas City Chiefs in the third round of the AFL's 1966 draft. Stenerud scored 11 points, including a then-Super Bowl record 48-yard field goal, in Kansas City's 23–7 Super Bowl IV win in 1970. He would later go on to play for the Green Bay Packers and Minnesota Vikings earning four trips to the Pro Bowl in his 19 seasons as a professional. He was inducted in 1991 and is one of only two pure kickers in the Pro Football Hall of Fame, the other being Morten Andersen. Stenerud's name is in the Kansas City Chiefs' ring of honor and he is one of just four MSU players to have his number "78" retired.

=== Canadian Football Hall of Fame ===
Al Wilson

Wilson was elected to the Canadian Football Hall of Fame on September 20, 1997, following a long career as an offensive lineman with the British Columbia Lions. The guard and center was awarded All-Western All-Star and All-Canadian All-Star honors for seven years, 1975–81. He was voted the Schenley Most Outstanding Offensive Lineman in 1977. He played in two Grey Cup games (1983 and 1985), and was a key member of B.C.'s 1985 championship team.

Harvey Wylie

Wylie was elected to the Canadian Football Hall of Fame on May 24, 1980. The former Bobcat All-America was a standout defensive back and kick return specialist for nine years with Calgary. He played for the Calgary Stampeders from 1956 to 1964, and for five straight years was an All-Western All-Star and twice was an All-Canadian All-Star.

== Future non-conference opponents ==
Announced schedules as of October 29, 2026.

2027	2028	2029	2030	2031	2032
vs North Dakota State at Allegiant Stadium in Las Vegas, Nevada	St. Thomas	LIU	West Georgia	at West Georgia	at South Dakota
Drake	at Tennessee Tech			South Dakota	
Tennessee Tech	Harvard				
