= 1954 Idaho State Bengals football team =

American college football season

1954 Idaho State Bengals football
- Conference: Rocky Mountain Conference
- Record: 5–3 (3–3 RMC)
- Head coach: Babe Caccia (3rd season)
- Home stadium: Spud Bowl

1954 Rocky Mountain Conference football standings
	Conf.					Overall
Team	W		L		T	W		L		T
Montana State $	6	–	0	–	0	8	–	1	–	0
Western State (CO)	7	–	1	–	0	9	–	1	–	0
Idaho State	3	–	3	–	0	4	–	4	–	0
Colorado Mines	4	–	4	–	0	4	–	5	–	0
Colorado State–Greeley	1	–	6	–	1	1	–	7	–	1
Colorado College	0	–	7	–	1	1	–	8	–	1
$ – Conference champion

The 1954 Idaho State Bengals football team was an American football team that represented Idaho State College (now known as Idaho State University) as a member of the Rocky Mountain Conference (RMC) during the 1954 college football season. In their third season under head coach Babe Caccia, the Bengals compiled a 5–3 record, with a mark of 3–3 in conference play, and finished third in the RMC.

== Schedule ==
Date	Opponent	Site	Result	Attendance	Source
September 18	College of Idaho*	Spud Bowl; Pocatello, ID	L 20–26		
September 25	at Colorado College	Washburn Field; Colorado Springs, CO	W 28–6		
October 2	Montana State	Spud Bowl; Pocatello, ID	L 20–39		
October 9	Colorado State–Greeley	Spud Bowl; Pocatello, ID	W 28–13		
October 14	at Western State (CO)	Gunnison, CO	L 7–35	2,500	
October 30	at Montana State	Gatton Field; Bozeman, MT	W 13–22 (forfeit win)		
November 6	at Colorado Mines	Brooks Field; Golden, CO	W 21–14		
November 11	Arizona State–Flagstaff*	Spud Bowl; Pocatello, ID	W 46–7	4,000	
*Non-conference game
