= Mike Kramer =

American football player and coach (born 1955)

Biographical details
- Born: July 25, 1954 (age 72); Colton, Washington, U.S.
- Education: Idaho, B.S. 1977; Eastern Washington, M.Ed. 1991

Playing career
- 1972–1975: Idaho
- Positions: Defensive end, center, guard

Coaching career (HC unless noted)
- 1976: Colton (WA) HS (asst.)
- 1977–1979: Helena (MT) HS (asst.)
- 1980–1982: Helena (MT) HS
- 1983–1984: Montana State (DL)
- 1985–1986: Montana State (DC)
- 1987–1988: Tacoma (WA) Stadium HS
- 1989–1993: Eastern Washington (DL)
- 1994–1999: Eastern Washington
- 2000–2006: Montana State
- 2010: Washington State (asst.)
- 2011–2016: Idaho State

Head coaching record
- Overall: 95–125 (college)
- Tournaments: 3–4 (NCAA I-AA/FCS playoffs)

Accomplishments and honors

Championships
- 4 Big Sky (1997, 2002, 2003, 2005)

Awards
- 4x Big Sky Coach of the Year (1997, 2002, 2005, 2014)

Michael David Kramer (born July 25, 1954) is an American former football coach and former player, most recently the head football coach at Idaho State University of the Big Sky Conference. Kramer was previously the head coach at two other schools in the conference: Eastern Washington University (1994–1999) and Montana State University (2000–2006). Kramer has coached teams to four Big Sky championships, one at Eastern Washington (1997), and three at Montana State (2002, 2003, and 2005). Kramer retired from his position at Idaho State on March 30, 2017.

== Playing career ==
A native of Colton, Washington, on the Palouse south of Pullman, Kramer graduated from Colton High School in 1972 and played college football at the University of Idaho in nearby Moscow. He was a lineman for the Vandals for four seasons under head coaches Don Robbins and Ed Troxel. He started nine games at defensive end as a true freshman in 1972, and seven on offense at center as a sophomore. During his final two seasons he started at guard for offensive coordinator Dennis Erickson.

Kramer was named most inspirational player (Hec Edmundson award) and the team's outstanding blocker as a senior in 1975. He was a member of Phi Gamma Delta fraternity, received his bachelor's degree from UI in 1977, and later earned a master's degree from EWU.

== Coaching career ==
Kramer began coaching in 1976 at his alma mater, Colton High, as an assistant for the 1976 season, then moved to Montana to coach at Helena High School, as an assistant for three years and as head coach for another three. He moved up to the college level at Montana State in 1983, coaching the defensive line under head coach Dave Arnold and the Bobcats won the Big Sky title and the I-AA national championship in 1984. He was the defensive coordinator for the next two seasons, which were much less successful, and Arnold and the staff was fired. Kramer coached in western Washington at Stadium High School in Tacoma for two seasons, then joined the staff at Eastern Washington in 1989 and coached the defensive line for five years. When head coach Dick Zornes retired, Kramer was promoted and led the Eagles for six seasons, through 1999.

== Head coaching record ==
=== College ===
Year	Team	Overall	Conference	Standing	Bowl/playoffs	TSN^{#}
Eastern Washington Eagles (Big Sky Conference) (1994–1999)
1994	Eastern Washington	4–7	2–5	T–6th		
1995	Eastern Washington	3–8	1–6	8th		
1996	Eastern Washington	6–5	4–4	T–5th		
1997	Eastern Washington	12–2	7–1	1st	L NCAA Division I-AA Semifinal	6
1998	Eastern Washington	5–6	4–4	T–4th		
1999	Eastern Washington	7–4	6–2	T–2nd		
Eastern Washington:		37–32	24–22			
Montana State Bobcats (Big Sky Conference) (2000–2006)
2000	Montana State	0–11	0–8	9th		
2001	Montana State	5–6	4–3	4th		
2002	Montana State	7–6	5–2	T–1st	L NCAA Division I-AA First Round	19
2003	Montana State	7–6	5–2	T–1st	L NCAA Division I-AA First Round	21
2004	Montana State	6–5	4–3	T–3rd		
2005	Montana State	7–4	5–2	T–1st		18
2006	Montana State	8–5	6–2	T–2nd	L NCAA Division I Quarterfinal	18
Montana State:		40–43	29–22			
Idaho State Bengals (Big Sky Conference) (2011–2016)
2011	Idaho State	2–9	1–7	8th		
2012	Idaho State	1–10	0–8	13th		
2013	Idaho State	3–9	1–7	T–11th		
2014	Idaho State	8–4	6–2	T–2nd		
2015	Idaho State	2–9	1–7	T–12th		
2016	Idaho State	2–9	1–7	13th		
Idaho State:		18–50	10–38			
Total:		95–125				
National championship Conference title Conference division title or championship game berth
