= 1956 NAIA football national championship =

	1st	2nd	3rd	4th	Total
Saint Joseph's (IN)	0	0	0	0	0
Montana State	0	0	0	0	0
- Date: December 22, 1956
- Stadium: War Memorial Stadium
- City: Little Rock, Arkansas

The 1956 NAIA football national championship was played on December 22, 1956, at War Memorial Stadium in Little Rock, Arkansas. During its one season stay in Little Rock, the NAIA championship game was called the Aluminum Bowl. The Montana State Bobcats and Saint Joseph's Pumas played to a 0–0 tie, and the teams were declared co-champions.
