= Eugene C. Woodruff =

American football coach and electrical engineer

Biographical details
- Born: April 8, 1871; St. Clair, Michigan, U.S.
- Died: March 20, 1944 (aged 72); State College, Pennsylvania, U.S
- Education: Michigan (BS, MS, Ph.D.)

Coaching career (HC unless noted)
- 1900: Montana Agricultural

Head coaching record
- Overall: 2–1

Eugene Cyrus Woodruff (April 8, 1871 – March 20, 1944) was an American college football coach and electrical engineer.

== University of Michigan ==
Woodruff graduated from the University of Michigan with degrees in engineering (BS, 1894; PhD, 1900) and music (MS, 1896).

== Montana Agricultural ==
Woodruff served as the head football coach at the Agricultural College of the State of Montana–now known as Montana State University—in Bozeman, Montana for one season in 1900.

== Academic career ==
Woodruff spent the later part of his career as a faculty member at Pennsylvania State University in State College, Pennsylvania and Millikin University in Decatur, Illinois.

== Death ==
Woodruff died of a heart attack on March 20, 1944, in State College, Pennsylvania.

== Head coaching record ==
Year	Team	Overall	Conference	Standing	Bowl/playoffs
Montana Agricultural (Independent) (1900)
1900	Montana Agricultural	2–1			
Montana Agricultural:		2–1			
Total:		2–1			
