= 1956 Ball State Cardinals football team =

American college football season

1956 Ball State Cardinals football
- Conference: Indiana Collegiate Conference
- Record: 4–4 (2–4 ICC)
- Head coach: Jim Freeman (1st season)
- Home stadium: Ball State Field

1956 Indiana Collegiate Conference football standings
	Conf.					Overall
Team	W		L		T	W		L		T
Saint Joseph's (IN) $^	6	–	0	–	0	8	–	1	–	1
Butler	5	–	1	–	0	6	–	2	–	0
Valparaiso	4	–	2	–	0	6	–	4	–	0
Evansville	3	–	3	–	0	4	–	5	–	0
Ball State	2	–	4	–	0	4	–	4	–	0
DePauw	1	–	5	–	0	1	–	6	–	1
Indiana State	0	–	6	–	0	2	–	6	–	0
$ – Conference champion; ^ – NAIA playoff (Aluminum Bowl) participant

The 1956 Ball State Cardinals football team was an American football team that represented Ball State Teachers College (later renamed Ball State University) in the Indiana Collegiate Conference (ICC) during the 1956 college football season. In its first season under head coach Jim Freeman, the team compiled a 4–4 record (2–4 against ICC opponents) and finished in fifth place out of seven teams in the ICC.

== Schedule ==
Date	Opponent	Site	Result	Attendance	Source
September 15	Hanover*	Ball State Field; Muncie, IN	W 12–7		
September 22	at Indiana (PA)*	Indiana, PA	W 26–0		
October 6	DePauw	Ball State Field; Muncie, IN	W 19–6		
October 13	Butler	Ball State Field; Muncie, IN	L 12–28		
October 20	at Indiana State	Memorial Stadium; Terre Haute, IN (Blue Key Victory Bell)	W 28–14		
October 27	at Valparaiso	Valparaiso, IN	L 12–49		
November 3	Saint Joseph's (IN)	Ball State Field; Muncie, IN	L 0–66		
November 10	at Evansville	Evansville, IN	L 7–33		
*Non-conference game
