= Tony Storti =

American football player, coach, and administrator (1922–2009)

Biographical details
- Born: June 19, 1922
- Died: January 23, 2009 (aged 86); Carlsbad, California, U.S.

Playing career
- 1946–1947: Delaware

Coaching career (HC unless noted)
- 1948–1951: Stout Institute
- 1952–1954: Montana State
- 1956–1957: Montana State

Administrative career (AD unless noted)
- 1952–1958: Montana State

Head coaching record
- Overall: 52–21–3
- Tournaments: 0–0–1 (NAIA playoffs)

Accomplishments and honors

Championships
- 1 NAIA (1956); 2 RMC (1954, 1956)

Anthony Wayne Storti (June 19, 1922 – January 23, 2009) was an American college football player and coach and college athletics administrator. He served as the head football coach at Stout Institute—now known as the University of Wisconsin–Stout–from 1948 to 1951 and two stints at Montana State University, from 1952 to 1954 and from 1956 to 1957, compiling a career head coaching record of 52–21–3. Storti was also the athletic director at Montana state from 1952 to 1958. He led the 1956 Montana State Bobcats to a tie in the NAIA football national championship and a share of the NAIA national title.

== Biography ==
A native of Eveleth, Minnesota, Storti served in the United States Army during World War II and attended the University of Wisconsin–Stout and the University of Delaware. He was a member of the football team at both schools. Storti died on January 23, 2009, in Carlsbad, California.

== Coaching career ==
Storti began his coaching career at Stout Institute—now known as the University of Wisconsin–Stout—in 1948. During his tenure at Stout Institute, he compiled a 21–9–2 record.

Storti was named the head football coach and athletic director at Montana State University in 1952. Under his direction, the program won its first national championship in 1956.

Storti is an inductee in the University of Wisconsin–Stout Athletic Hall of Fame and Montana State Bobcat Hall of Fame.

== Head coaching record ==
=== College ===
Year	Team	Overall	Conference	Standing	Bowl/playoffs
Stout Institute Blue Devils (Wisconsin State College Conference) (1948–1951)
1949	Stout Institute	3–4–1	3–3	T–5th	
1949	Stout Institute	6–2	4–2	3rd	
1950	Stout Institute	5–2–1	3–2–1	4th	
1951	Stout Institute	7–1	5–1	2nd	
Stout Institute:		21–9–2	15–8–1		
Montana State Bobcats (Rocky Mountain Conference) (1952–1954)
1952	Montana State	2–5	1–4	5th	
1953	Montana State	4–4	4–1	2nd	
1954	Montana State	8–1	6–0	1st	
Montana State Bobcats (Rocky Mountain Conference) (1956)
1956	Montana State	9–0–1	5–0	1st	T NAIA championship
Montana State Bobcats (Independent) (1957)
1957	Montana State	8–2			
Montana State:		31–12–1	16–5		
Total:		52–21–3			
National championship Conference title Conference division title or championship game berth
