= Ron Warzeka =

American football player (1935–2017)

No. 78
- Position: Defensive tackle

Personal information
- Born: December 24, 1935; Great Falls, Montana, U.S.
- Died: June 7, 2017 (aged 81); Boise, Idaho, U.S.
- Listed height: 6 ft 4 in (1.93 m)
- Listed weight: 250 lb (113 kg)

Career information
- High school: Great Falls
- College: Montana State
- NFL draft: 1957: 14th round, 164th overall pick

Career history
- San Francisco 49ers (1957)*; Oakland Raiders (1960)
- * Offseason or practice squad member only
- Stats at Pro Football Reference

Ronald Dwain Warzeka (December 24, 1935 – June 7, 2017) was an American football player who played one season with the Oakland Raiders. He played college football at Montana State University.
