= Travis Jonsen =

American football player (born 1996)

No. 10
- Position: Wide receiver

Personal information
- Born: October 16, 1996 (age 30); Fullerton, California, U.S.
- Listed height: 6 ft 4 in (1.93 m)
- Listed weight: 211 lb (96 kg)

Career information
- High school: Servite (Anaheim, California)
- College: Oregon (2015–2016); Riverside City (2017); Montana State (2018–2019)
- NFL draft: 2020: undrafted

Career history
- Tampa Bay Buccaneers (2020–2021)*; Detroit Lions (2021)*; Tampa Bay Buccaneers (2022)*; San Antonio Brahmas (2023)
- * Offseason or practice squad member only

Awards and highlights
- Super Bowl champion (LV); First-team All-Big Sky (2019)

Career XFL statistics
- GP / GS: 8 / 2
- Receptions: 5
- Receiving yards: 44
- Return yards: 174
- Stats at Pro Football Reference

Travis Jonsen (born October 16, 1996) is an American former football wide receiver. He was rated by Rivals.com as the third-best dual-threat quarterback in the high school class of 2015. He originally enrolled at the University of Oregon but left the school after two seasons on the bench. He played college football for the Montana State Bobcats from 2018 to 2019 as a wide receiver and wildcat quarterback. He signed with the Tampa Bay Buccaneers as an undrafted free agent in 2020, and earned a Super Bowl ring as a member of the team's practice squad during the 2020 season. Jonsen later played for the San Antonio Brahmas of the XFL.

== Early life ==
Travis Jonsen was born on October 16, 1996, in Fullerton, California. He played high school football at Servite High School in Anaheim, California. He threw for 3,361 yards and 26 touchdowns during his high school career while also rushing for 2,133 yards and 26 touchdowns. In the class of 2015, Rivals.com rated Jonsen the third-best dual-threat quarterback in the nation, the tenth overall prospect in California, and the 49th prospect in the country.

== College career ==
Jonsen began attending class at the University of Oregon in spring 2015 after graduating high school early. He missed the 2015 season due to turf toe surgery. He redshirted the 2016 season. Jonsen took part in spring practices in 2017 but then left the school after it became clear that Justin Herbert would remain the starter.

Jonsen transferred to Riverside City College, a junior college, so he would not have to sit out the 2017 season. As the backup quarterback to Vic Viramontes in 2017, Jonsen completed 26 of 48 passes for 372 yards while rushing 38 times for 425 yards and three touchdowns.

Jonsen transferred to play for the Montana State Bobcats of Montana State University in 2018. In February 2018, he broke his foot after slipping on ice. He missed 2018 spring practice as a result. Jonsen lost the starting quarterback competition to Troy Andersen, and was then asked to play wide receiver. Jonsen played both receiver and wildcat quarterback for the Bobcats from 2018 to 2019. He appeared in 12 games during the 2018 season, recording 28 receptions for 319 yards and one touchdown, five completions on six passing attempts for 43 yards and one touchdown, and 36 rushes for 199 yards and five touchdowns. Jonsen played in 13 games as a senior team captain in 2019, totaling 55 catches for 580 yards and one touchdown, six of seven passes for 64 yards and one touchdown, and 82 carries for 526 yards and eight touchdowns. He was named first-team All-Big Sky as an all-purpose player. He also played special teams as a gunner while at Montana State.

== Professional career ==
Jonsen signed with the Tampa Bay Buccaneers on May 4, 2020, after going undrafted in the 2020 NFL draft. He was released with an injury settlement on August 12 after suffering a quadriceps injury. He was later re-signed to the practice squad on October 13, where he spent the remainder of the season. In practice during the playoffs, Jonsen simulated New Orleans Saints quarterback Taysom Hill and Green Bay Packers wide receiver Davante Adams. On February 7, 2021, the Buccaneers won Super Bowl LV against the Kansas City Chiefs by a score of 31–9. Jonsen re-signed with Tampa Bay on February 9, 2021. He was released on August 31 and signed to the practice squad the next day. He was placed on the COVID-19 list on September 21, moved back to the practice squad on September 30, and released on October 21, 2021.

Jonsen was signed to the practice squad of the Detroit Lions on November 9, 2021. He was released on November 18, 2021.

Jonsen signed a futures contract with the Buccaneers on January 31, 2022. He was released on May 31, 2022, after being arrested for a DUI.

On November 16, 2022, Jonsen was selected by the San Antonio Brahmas in the tenth round, with the 78th overall pick, of the skill players portion of the 2023 XFL draft. He played in eight games, starting two, at wide receiver for the Brahmas during the 2023 season, catching five passes for 44 yards while also returning seven kicks for 174 yards. He was released on August 3, 2023, during the offseason.
