= 1984 NCAA Division I-AA Football Championship Game =

1984 NCAA Division I-AA Football Championship
- I-AA National Championship Game
Louisiana Tech Bulldogs	Montana State Bobcats
(10–4)	(11–2)
Southland	Big Sky
6	19
Head coach: A. L. Williams	Head coach: Dave Arnold
NCAA / Seed; 9 / –	NCAA / Seed; 2 (tie) / 3
	1	2	3	4	Total
Louisiana Tech	0	0	0	6	6
Montana State	9	10	0	0	19
- Date: December 15, 1984
- Season: 1984
- Stadium: Johnson Hagood Stadium
- Location: Charleston, South Carolina
- Referee: Courtney Mauzy (ACC)
- Attendance: 9,125

United States TV coverage
- Network: Satellite Program Network
- Announcers: Bill Flemming (play-by-play), Steve Davis (color)

The 1984 NCAA Division I-AA Football Championship Game was a postseason college football game between the Montana State Bobcats and the Louisiana Tech Bulldogs. The game was played on December 15, 1984, at Johnson Hagood Stadium in Charleston, South Carolina. The culminating game of the 1984 NCAA Division I-AA football season, it was won by Montana State, 19–6.

The championship game was televised on the Satellite Program Network (SPN), as the NCAA paid SPN to broadcast some playoff contests following a Supreme Court ruling (NCAA v. Board of Regents of the University of Oklahoma) that halted the NCAA's practice of negotiating television contracts for its members.

== Teams ==
The participants of the Championship Game were the finalists of the 1984 I-AA Playoffs, which began with a 12-team bracket.

=== Montana State Bobcats ===
Montana State finished their regular season with a 9–2 record (6–1 in conference); two wins came over Division II opponents (Mesa State and Portland State) and one win came over a Division I-A program (Fresno State). Tied for second in the final NCAA I-AA in-house poll and seeded third in the tournament, the Bobcats received a first-round bye then defeated Arkansas State and second-seed Rhode Island to reach the final. This was the first appearance for Montana State in a Division I-AA championship game.

=== Louisiana Tech Bulldogs ===
Louisiana Tech finished their regular season with a 7–4 record (5–1 in conference); three of their losses were to Division I-A programs (Southwestern Louisiana, Southern Miss, and Ole Miss). Ranked ninth in the final NCAA I-AA in-house poll and unseeded in the tournament, the Bulldogs defeated Mississippi Valley State, top-seed Alcorn State, and Middle Tennessee State to reach the final. This was also the first appearance for Louisiana Tech in a Division I-AA championship game.

== Game summary ==
=== Scoring summary ===
Scoring summary

Quarter	Time	Drive			Team	Scoring information	Score	
Quarter	Time	Plays	Yards	TOP	Team	Scoring information	La. Tech	MSU
1	11:59	6	15	1:01	MSU	33-yard field goal by Mark Carter	0	3
1		4	31	0:41	MSU	Joe Bignell 17-yard touchdown reception from Kelly Bradley, Carter kick no good (wide left)	0	9
2	4:54	5	80	2:10	MSU	Bignell 33-yard touchdown reception from Bradley, Carter kick good	0	16
2	0:06				MSU	48-yard field goal by Carter	0	19
4	0:48				La. Tech	Michael Sherman 10-yard touchdown reception from Kyle Gandy, 2-point pass incomplete	6	19
"TOP" = time of possession. For other American football terms, see Glossary of American football.							6	19

=== Game statistics ===
	1	2	3	4	Total
Bulldogs	0	0	0	6	6
Bobcats	9	10	0	0	19

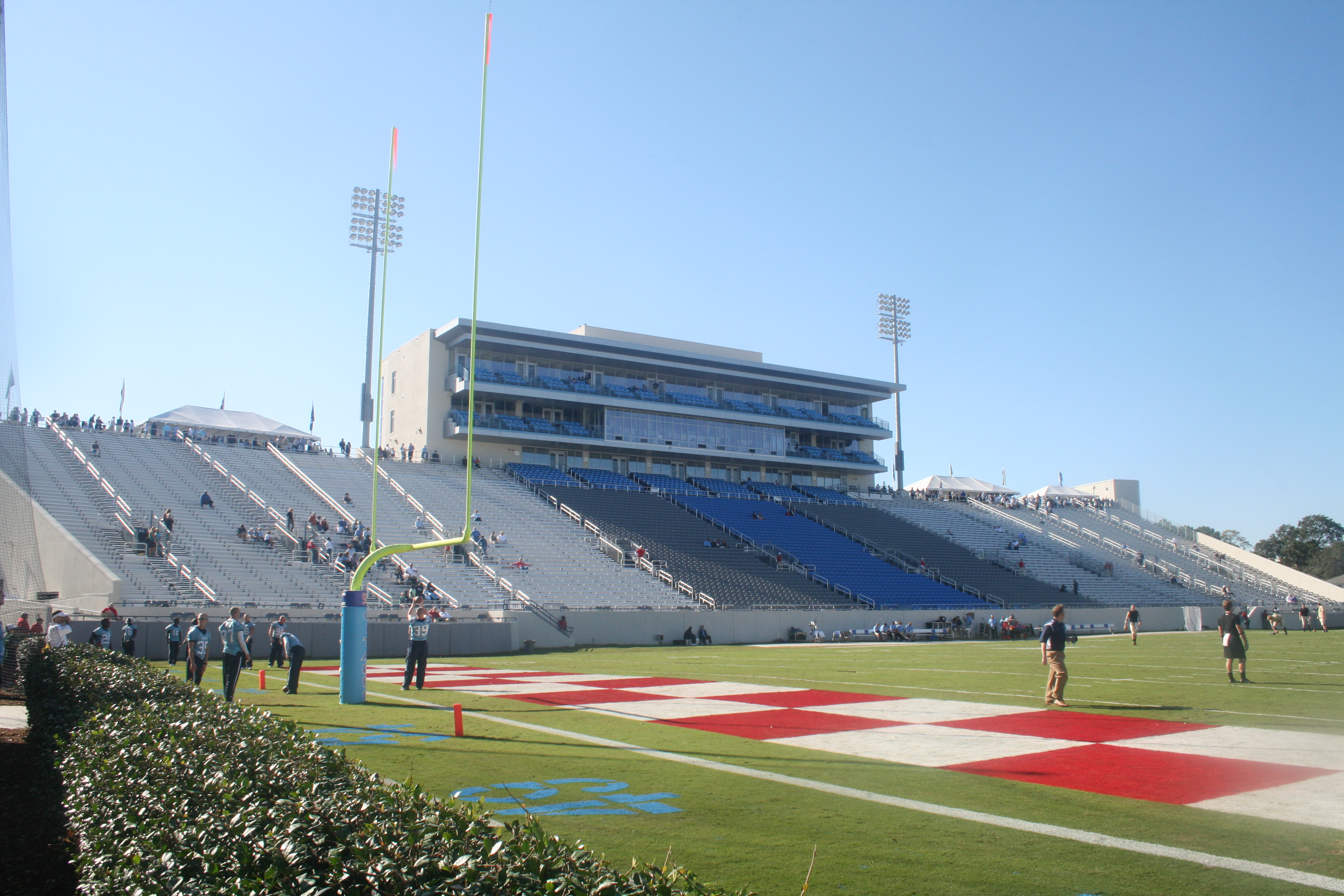
Johnson Hagood Stadium, site of the 1984 Division I-AA championship game

Statistics	La. Tech	MSU
First downs	19	20
Plays–yards	74–262	82–340
Rushes–yards	36–(-25)	25–6
Passing yards	287	334
Passing: comp–att–int	24–38–4	32–57–1
Time of possession	29:51	30:08

Team	Category	Player	Statistics
Louisiana Tech	Passing	Kyle Gandy	24–38, 287 yds, 1 TD, 4 INT
Louisiana Tech	Rushing	Gerry Jones	4 car, 16 yds
Louisiana Tech	Receiving	Michael Sherman	4 rec, 77 yds, 1 TD
Montana State	Passing	Kelly Bradley	32–57, 334 yds, 2 TD, 1 INT
Montana State	Rushing	Jesse Jones	4 car, 13 yds
Montana State	Receiving	Joe Bignell	10 rec, 130 yds, 2 TD
