= Tom Parac =

American football coach, athletics administrator (1932–2023)

Biographical details
- Born: January 21, 1932; Lewistown, Montana, U.S.
- Died: December 29, 2023 (aged 91); Bozeman, Montana, U.S.
- Education: Montana State

Playing career
- c. 1953: Montana State
- Position: Quarterback

Coaching career (HC unless noted)
- 1957–1967: Montana State (assistant)
- 1968–1970: Montana State

Administrative career (AD unless noted)
- 1971–1985: Montana State

Head coaching record
- Overall: 9–20

Accomplishments and honors

Championships
- 1 Big Sky (1968)

Thomas Joseph Parac (January 21, 1932 – December 29, 2023) was an American college football coach and athletics administrator. He served as the head football coach at Montana State University from 1968 to 1970, compiling a record of 9–20. Parac was also the athletic director at Montana State from 1971 to 1985. A native of Lewistown, Montana, Parac played college football as a quarterback at Montana State, where he also lettered in basketball and baseball.

Parac was born on January 21, 1932, in Lewistown, Montana, to Joseph Marion Parac and Helen (Kovacich) Parac. He died on December 29, 2023, at Spring Creek Care Center in Bozeman, Montana.

== Head coaching record ==
Year	Team	Overall	Conference	Standing	Bowl/playoffs
Montana State Bobcats (Big Sky Conference) (1968–1970)
1968	Montana State	6–4	3–1	T–1st	
1969	Montana State	1–8	0–4	5th	
1970	Montana State	2–8	1–5	6th	
Montana State:		9–20	4–10		
Total:		9–20			
National championship Conference title Conference division title or championship game berth
