= Dave Arnold (American football) =

American football coach

Biographical details
- Born: September 17, 1944 (age 82)

Coaching career (HC unless noted)
- 1968–1972: Midland HS (MI) (assistant)
- 1973: Alma HS (MI) (assistant)
- 1974–1979: Alma HS (MI)
- 1980–1981: Michigan State (OL)
- 1982: Montana State (OL)
- 1983–1986: Montana State
- 1987–1988: Washington State (ST/OL)
- 1989–1994: Miami (FL) (ST/TE/RB)
- 1995–1997: Seattle Seahawks (ST)
- 1999–2004: Albion (assistant)
- 2005–2007: Colorado State (assistant)

Head coaching record
- Overall: 18–29 (college)
- Tournaments: 3–0 (NCAA D-I-AA playoffs)

Accomplishments and honors

Championships
- 1 NCAA Division I-AA national (1984); 1 Big Sky (1984)

Awards
- AFCA Division I-AA Coach of the Year (1984); Kodak National Coach of the Year (1984); Big Sky Coach of the Year (1984)

Dave Arnold (born September 17, 1944) is an American former football coach. He was the head coach at Montana State University from 1983 to 1986, compiling a record of 18–29 (.383).

In his second season in 1984, Arnold led the Bobcats to a surprising 9–2 record in the regular season, the Big Sky Conference title, and the Division I-AA national championship, finishing at the year at 12–2. For his effort, he was named the AFCA Division I-AA Coach of the Year that season. The 1984 championship run followed a season in 1983 in which the Bobcats finished 1–10 and last in the conference, but defeated their in-state rival, the University of Montana Grizzlies, for their sole win. The eleven-game turnaround is one of the largest in college football history.

After MSU, Arnold was an assistant coach under Dennis Erickson at Washington State University and the University of Miami, and later in the National Football League (NFL), coordinating the special teams for the Seattle Seahawks from 1995 through 1997. With the Seahawks, he coached with Rick Tuten when he led the NFL in yards per punt in 1995. Kicker Todd Peterson made over 82 percent of his field goals in 1995 and 1996.

== Head coaching record ==
=== College ===
Year	Team	Overall	Conference	Standing	Bowl/playoffs
Montana State Bobcats (Big Sky Conference) (1983–1986)
1983	Montana State	1–10	1–6	8th	
1984	Montana State	12–2	6–1	1st	W NCAA Division I-AA Championship
1985	Montana State	2–9	1–6	T–7th	
1986	Montana State	3–8	2–5	T–6th	
Montana State:		18–29	10–18		
Total:		18–29			
National championship Conference title Conference division title or championship game berth
