= Sonny Holland =

American football player and coach (1938–2022)

Biographical details
- Born: March 22, 1938; Butte, Montana, U.S.
- Died: December 3, 2022 (aged 84)

Playing career
- 1956–1959: Montana State
- Position: Center

Coaching career (HC unless noted)
- 1961: Bozeman HS (MT) (line)
- 1962: Montana State (GA)
- 1963–1964: Montana State (line)
- 1965–1967: Charles M. Russel HS (MT)
- 1968: Washington State (OL)
- 1969: Western Montana
- 1970: Montana State (DL)
- 1971–1977: Montana State

Head coaching record
- Overall: 54–24–1 (college)
- Tournaments: 3–0 (NCAA D-II playoffs)

Accomplishments and honors

Championships
- 1 NCAA Division II (1976); 1 Frontier (1969); 2 Big Sky (1972, 1976)

Awards
- Montana State No. 52 retired

Allyn A. "Sonny" Holland (March 22, 1938 – December 3, 2022) was an American football player and coach. He was the head coach at his alma mater, Montana State University in Bozeman, from 1971 to 1977. Holland led the Bobcats to two Big Sky titles (1972, 1976) and the Division II playoffs in 1976, where they won all three postseason games and were national champions.

A native of Butte, Holland graduated from Butte High School and was a lineman at Montana State from 1956 to 1959, where he was a small college All-American at center.,

Holland was an assistant coach under Jim Sweeney at Montana State and then was head coach at Charles M. Russell High School in Great Falls for three seasons, from 1965 to 1967. He rejoined Sweeney for a year at Washington State in Pullman, then was the head coach Western Montana College in Dillon in 1969. Holland returned to Bozeman in 1970 as the Bobcats' defensive line coach under Tom Parac, then was promoted to head coach after the season.

At age 39, Holland stepped down as the Montana State head coach in November 1977, and was succeeded by Sonny Lubick. The spring football game at Montana State is named for Holland and a bronze statue of him was unveiled at Bobcat Stadium in September 2016.

Holland died on December 3, 2022, at the age of 84, after suffering from Parkinson's disease.

== Head coaching record ==
=== College ===
Year	Team	Overall	Conference	Standing	Bowl/playoffs
Western Montana Bulldogs (Frontier Conference) (1969)
1969	Western Montana	7–0	5–0	1st	
Western Montana:		7–0	5–0		
Montana State Bobcats (Big Sky Conference) (1971–1977)
1971	Montana State	2–7–1	0–5–1	7th	
1972	Montana State	8–3	5–1	1st	
1973	Montana State	7–4	5–1	2nd	
1974	Montana State	7–3	4–2	2nd	
1975	Montana State	5–5	4–2	T–2nd	
1976	Montana State	12–1	6–0	1st	W NCAA Division II Championship
1977	Montana State	6–4	3–3	3rd	
Montana State:		47–24–1	27–14–1		
Total:		54–24–1			
National championship Conference title Conference division title or championship game berth
