= Saint Joseph's College (Indiana) =

Catholic liberal arts college in Rensselaer, Indiana, U.S.

- Motto: Religio Moralitas Scientia
- Motto in English: Reverence, Morality, Knowledge
- Type: Private college
- Active: 1889–2017, 2020-present
- Affiliations: Roman Catholic Church (Missionaries of the Precious Blood)
- Location: Rensselaer, Indiana, United States; 40.92°N 87.156°W
- Campus: 180 acres (72.8 ha); Rural
- Colors: Purple and Cardinal
- Nickname: Pumas
- Website: www.saintjoe.edu

Saint Joseph's College (SJC; colloquially, Saint Joe) is an unaccredited private Catholic college in Collegeville, Indiana, United States, with a Rensselaer postal address. It was founded in 1889 and suspended academic operations in 2017 with approximately 1,100 students enrolled.

== History ==
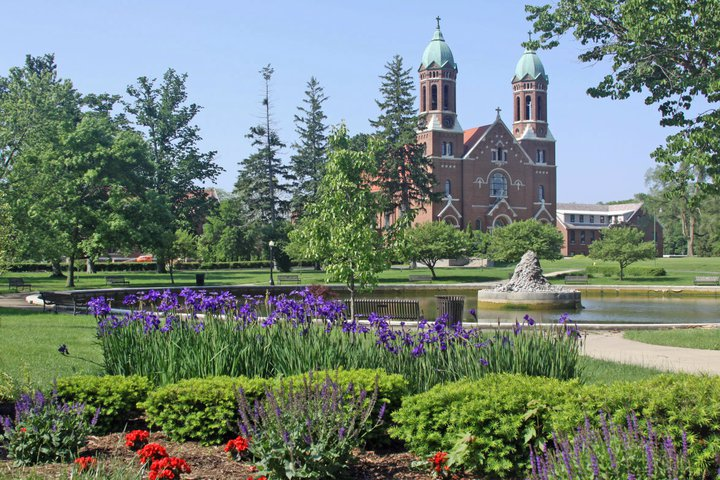
The Chapel is one of the oldest buildings on campus, and is where regular religious events are held.

The college was founded in 1889 by Father Joseph A. Stephan, a missionary from Germany as a secondary school to assimilate Native Americans. In 1962, President Eisenhower dedicated the Halleck Center (named after Republican representative Charles Halleck).

From 1944 to 1974, the Chicago Bears held their training camp at Saint Joseph's College. The 1971 film Brian's Song—about Brian Piccolo, a Chicago Bears running back who died from carcinoma in the 1970s—was filmed on campus.

The main academic building burned to the ground on February 3, 1973. At the time, many thought the fire would close the school, but it recovered.

After much discussion, on February 3, 2017, college administrators announced that the college would close at the end of the 2016–17 academic year, as the college needed $100 million to continue operating: $27 million in debt, $35 million in infrastructure improvements, and $38 million to "re-engineer" the college. Outgoing president Robert Pastoor noted hopes of reopening, although his resignation was to take effect in May 2017. Three months later, administrators also announced that they were resigning the college's accreditation with the Higher Learning Commission.

Since 2017, the college has worked to restore academic programming on campus. In 2020, it introduced health science certification programs, and by 2025 expanded its offerings to include veterinary certifications, a CDL Academy providing Class A and Class B training, and a Building and Trades program. During this period, the college has also partnered with Marian University, Ivy Tech, Calumet College of Saint Joseph, the University of St. Thomas–Houston, and Bethel University to reintroduce credit-bearing coursework to campus.

== Campus ==
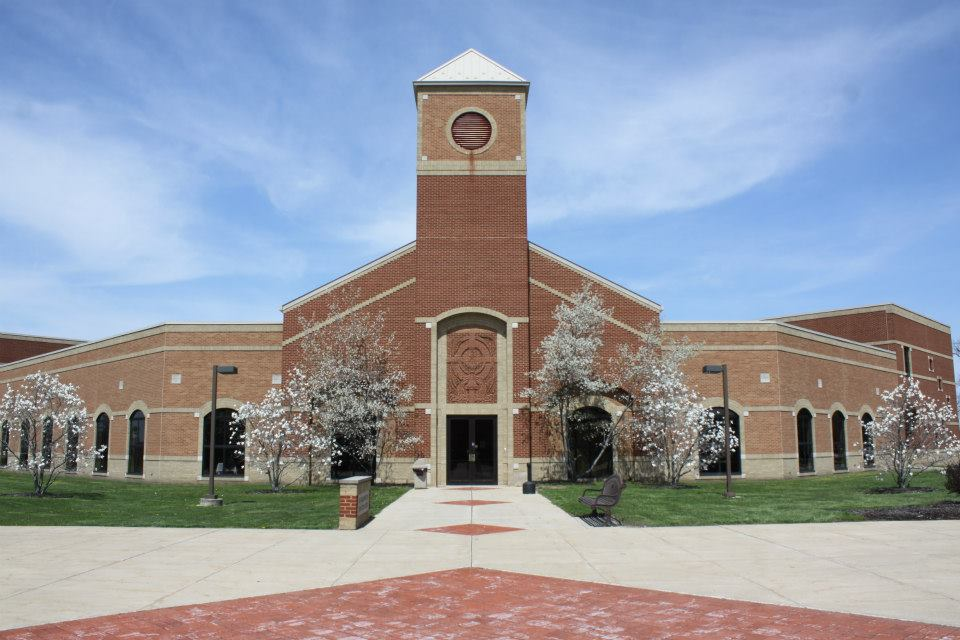
The Core building, one of the academic buildings on campus

The campus has several distinctive features. The Romanesque-style Chapel and the reflecting pond in front of the Chapel are the most recognized features of campus. Drexel Hall was one of the first buildings on campus, and is distinctive for its unique atrium. Drexel has been renovated and restored to its historical appearance. The campus also includes a private recreational lake which is an old stone quarry.

== Academics ==
From 1932 until 2017, the college was accredited by the Higher Learning Commission (HLC). Specific programs were accredited or approved by the National Council for Accreditation of Teacher Education (NCATE), the National League for Nursing (NLN), the Board of Commissioners of the International Assembly of Collegiate Business Education (IACBE), and the State of Indiana Professional Standards Board for the Training of Elementary Teachers.

Saint Joseph's College was known for its Core Program under which students learned the basics of history, political science, natural science, literature and philosophy in integrated "core classes". This differed from other approaches to general education used by most colleges and universities in which students take discrete lower division classes in these subjects.

== Student life ==
Like most other Indiana colleges, SJC held an annual "Little 500" race. Unlike the bed or bicycle races held elsewhere, Saint Joseph's College staged a go-kart race in the same manner as Purdue University's Grand Prix, albeit on a much smaller scale. The event was popular and brought alumni back to the school every year.

== Athletics ==
The Saint Joseph's athletic teams were called the Pumas. The college was a member of the Division II ranks of the National Collegiate Athletic Association (NCAA), primarily competing as a member of the Great Lakes Valley Conference (GLVC) from 1977–78 until its initial closure at the end of the 2016–17 academic year. Saint Joseph's competed in 15 intercollegiate varsity sports teams: Men's sports included baseball, basketball, cross country, football, golf, soccer, tennis and track & field; while women's sports included basketball, cross country, football, golf, soccer, softball, tennis, track & field and volleyball.

=== Mascot ===
The school mascot was the Puma. It is the only post-secondary institution in the United States with the puma as its mascot, although several have mountain lions, which is a different name for the same species.

=== History ===
In 1956, the Saint Joseph's football team won a share of the NAIA Football National Championship, playing Montana State to a 0–0 tie in the Aluminum Bowl at War Memorial Stadium in Little Rock, Arkansas. The Pumas won six Indiana Collegiate Conference titles; 1955 co-champions, 1956, 1957, 1971, 1976 co-champions and 1977 co-champions. The football team had been dominant in their conference near its final years, winning the Great Lakes Football Conference championship in 2006, 2009 and 2010.

The school's baseball team was runner-up to the NCAA Division II Baseball Championship in 1996, led by pitcher Rick O'Dette, who would later be drafted by the Boston Red Sox in the 1997 MLB Draft (15th Round). The same year, the women's soccer team was the runner-up in the NCAA Division II Women's Soccer Championship. The school's women's tennis team has captured six GLVC conference titles since 1985 and completed three undefeated seasons.

In 2010, the men's basketball team led by head coach Richard Davis put together a string of three wins in the NCAA Division II men's basketball tournament to reach the Elite Eight for the second time in school history.

== Notable people ==
- Philip F. Deaver, writer and poet, graduated from St. Joseph's College in 1968. He went on to win O. Henry and Flannery O'Connor awards for short fiction, and to publish poetry and fiction in dozens of literary journals.
- Mark S. Doss, Grammy Award-winning African-American bass-baritone, specializing in opera, concert and recital.
- Gil Hodges, Major League Baseball Hall of Fame player, played college basketball and baseball at Saint Joseph's College, and later went on to play for the Brooklyn and Los Angeles Dodgers and the New York Mets. The Mets traded him to the Washington Senators, he retired and became the Senators manager. Following 5 seasons in Washington (1963–67), he returned to New York and led the Mets to their first World Series title in 1969. The baseball field is named in his honor.
- J. Patrick Lewis, American poet and prose writer noted for his children's poems and other light verse.
- John McGarry, National Football League player.
- Kevin McGuff, current Ohio State Buckeyes women's basketball head coach.
- Gilbert Parent, former Canadian Member of Parliament and Speaker of the House of Commons of Canada.
- Michael Y. Scudder, American lawyer and Seventh Circuit judge.
- Jake Teshka, member of the Indiana House of Representatives.
- Edward Vrdolyak, former Chicago Alderman.
