= Jim Hess =

American football player and coach (1936–2021)

Biographical details
- Born: December 1, 1936; Farmersville, Texas, U.S.
- Died: October 2, 2021 (aged 84); San Angelo, Texas, U.S.
- Education: North Texas

Playing career
- 1956–1957: Paris
- 1958–1959: Southeastern Oklahoma State
- Positions: Fullback, cornerback

Coaching career (HC unless noted)
- 1961–1962: McKinney HS (TX) (assistant)
- 1963–1964: Rockwall HS (TX)
- 1965–1966: Kilgore HS (TX)
- 1967–1970: Rice (DL)
- 1971: Baytown Sterling HS (TX)
- 1972–1973: Angelo State (DC)
- 1974–1981: Angelo State
- 1982–1988: Stephen F. Austin
- 1990–1996: New Mexico State

Administrative career (AD unless noted)
- 1982–1989: Stephen F. Austin

Head coaching record
- Overall: 134–108–5 (college)
- Tournaments: 4–2 (NAIA D-I playoffs); 1–1 (NCAA D-I-AA playoffs)

Accomplishments and honors

Championships
- 1 NAIA Division I (1978); 1 LSC (1978); 1 Gulf Star (1985)

Awards
- NAIA Coach of the Year (1978); LSC Coach of the Year (1977)

James Ray Hess (December 1, 1936 – October 2, 2021) was an American football coach and college athletics administrator. He served as the head football coach at Angelo State University in San Angelo, Texas from 1974 to 1981, Stephen F. Austin State University in Nacogdoches, Texas from 1982 to 1988, and New Mexico State University in Las Cruces, New Mexico from 1990 to 1996, compiling career college football coaching record of 134–108–5. Hess led his 1978 Angelo State team to a NAIA Division I Football National Championship. Hess began his coaching career at the high school level in the state of Texas. He was also a scout for the Dallas Cowboys of the National Football League (NFL).

== Early years ==
Hess was a native of Farmersville, Texas. He attended Farmersville High School. He later enrolled at Paris Junior College. He transferred to Southeastern Oklahoma State University after his sophomore season. He received his master's degree from the University of North Texas in 1966.

== Professional career ==
Hess began his football coaching career at Farmersville High School in 1959, winning one district title. He then was hired as an assistant at McKinney High School from 1961 to 1962. He coached at Rockwall High School from 1963 to 1964, where his team captured the 1963 Class AA state championship. He was hired at Kilgore High School from 1965 to 1966. In 1967, he became an assistant coach at Rice University. In 1971, he returned to the high school ranks as the head coach at Sterling High School.

In 1972, he was hired at Angelo State University as the defensive coordinator. He was the head football coach from 1974 to 1981. In 1977, he was named the conference Coach of the Year. In 1978, the team went undefeated (14-0) and won the NAIA Division I Football National Championship, while he received NAIA Coach of the Year honors. He led the Rams to six Top 20 rankings and a 65-23 (.731) mark, at the time the highest winning percentage in school history. He was also one of the few coaches to win more than 100 games at the I-AA level.

He coached at Stephen F. Austin State University from 1982 to 1988, where he compiled a 47–30–2 record, including a 10–3 mark in his final season. He led the school to five winning seasons, its first-ever conference title in 1985 and earned conference Coach of the Year honors. He resigned at the end of the 1988 season with a 47-30-2 (.608) record, the highest winning percentage in school history at the time. In 1989, he was named the athletic director. During his time with the school, he was instrumental in moving the program from the NAIA to NCAA Division II and into Division I-AA, while helping to renovate the athletic facilities.

Hess was named the head coach at New Mexico State University in 1990, where he inherited a 17-game losing streak. Although his Aggie team was called the “worst team in America” in 1992 by Sports Illustrated, he led the program to its first winning season in 14 years with a 6-5 mark, while being named the Big West Coach of the Year. He was fired in 1996 after his second 1–10 season at the school. He was the fourth winningest coach in school history with a 22-55-0 record. He finished with a career college coaching record of 134–108–5.

== Personal life ==
Hess was hired by the Dallas Cowboys as an area scout for the Midwest in 1997, where he remained until 2006. Sean Payton and him are credited with "finding" Tony Romo in 2006, then an unknown, undrafted free-agent from Division I-AA Eastern Illinois. Hess later worked for Daktronics and as color commentator for football games at Angelo State University. Hess died at the age of 84 on October 2, 2021.

== Head coaching record ==
=== College ===
Year	Team	Overall	Conference	Standing	Bowl/playoffs
Angelo State Rams (Lone Star Conference) (1974–1981)
1974	Angelo State	5–6	3–6	8th	
1975	Angelo State	8–2–1	7–1–1	2nd	
1976	Angelo State	5–5–1	3–3–1	5th	
1977	Angelo State	8–2	5–2	T–3rd	
1978	Angelo State	14–0	7–0	1st	W NAIA Division I Championship
1979	Angelo State	9–3	5–2	T–2nd	L NAIA Division I Semifinal
1980	Angelo State	8–2–1	5–1–1	2nd	L NAIA Division I Quarterfinal
1981	Angelo State	8–3	5–2	T–2nd	
Angelo State:		65–23–3	40–17–3		
Stephen F. Austin Lumberjacks (Lone Star Conference) (1982–1983)
1982	Stephen F. Austin	6–5	4–3	T–2nd	
1983	Stephen F. Austin	7–4	5–2	3rd	
Stephen F. Austin Lumberjacks (Gulf Star Conference) (1984–1986)
1984	Stephen F. Austin	7–3–1	1–3–1	5th	
1985	Stephen F. Austin	9–2	4–1	T–1st	
1986	Stephen F. Austin	5–6	1–3	5th	
Stephen F. Austin Lumberjacks (Southland Conference) (1987–1988)
1987	Stephen F. Austin	3–7–1	1–5	T–6th	
1988	Stephen F. Austin	10–3	5–1	2nd	L NCAA Division I-AA Quarterfinal
Stephen F. Austin:		47–30–2	20–18–1		
New Mexico State Aggies (Big West Conference) (1990–1996)
1990	New Mexico State	1–10	1–6	7th	
1991	New Mexico State	2–9	2–5	7th	
1992	New Mexico State	6–5	3–3	T–4th	
1993	New Mexico State	5–6	4–3	4th	
1994	New Mexico State	3–8	2–5	8th	
1995	New Mexico State	4–7	3–4	T–6th	
1996	New Mexico State	1–10	0–5	6th	
New Mexico State:		22–55	15–32		
Total:		134–108–5			
National championship Conference title Conference division title or championship game berth
