= John O'Hara (American football) =

American football coach

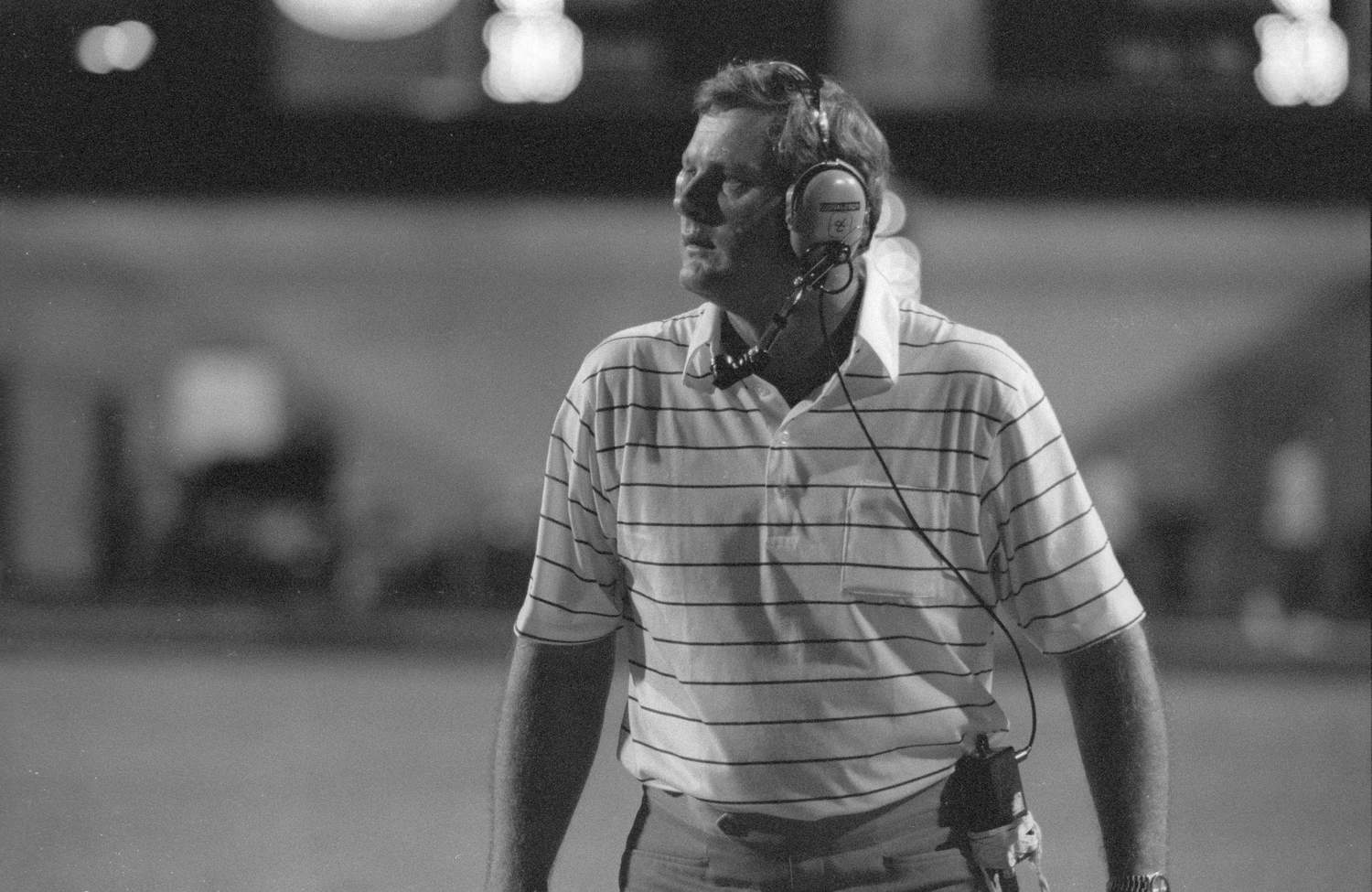
- O'Hara in 1988

Biographical details
- Born: January 13, 1944
- Died: February 22, 1992 (aged 48)

Coaching career (HC unless noted)
- 1967: Mangum HS (OK)
- 1968–1969: Palo Duro HS (TX) (OL)
- 1970–1972: Lee HS (TX) (OC)
- 1973–1978: Baylor (assistant)
- 1979–1982: Baylor (OC)
- 1983–1989: Southwest Texas State
- 1990–1991: Iowa (OL)

Head coaching record
- Overall: 36–41
- Tournaments: 0–1 (NCAA D-I-AA playoffs)

Accomplishments and honors

Championships
- 1 LSC (1983)

John Barton O'Hara (January 13, 1944 – February 22, 1992) was an American football coach. He served as the head football coach at Southwest Texas State University–now known as Texas State University–from 1983 to 1989, compiling a record of 36–41. O'Hara died in 1992 on a Caribbean cruise while he was a member of the University of Iowa coaching staff.

== Head coaching record ==
| Year | Team | Overall | Conference | Standing | Bowl/playoffs |
|---|---|---|---|---|---|
Southwest Texas State Bobcats (Lone Star Conference) (1983)
| 1983 | Southwest Texas State | 9–2 | 6–1 | T–1st | L NCAA Division II Quarterfinal |
Southwest Texas State Bobcats (Gulf Star Conference) (1984–1986)
| 1984 | Southwest Texas State | 7–4 | 2–3 | 4th | |
| 1985 | Southwest Texas State | 3–8 | 2–3 | T–3rd | |
| 1986 | Southwest Texas State | 4–7 | 2–2 | T–2nd | |
Southwest Texas State Bobcats (Southland Conference) (1987–1989)
| 1987 | Southwest Texas State | 4–7 | 2–4 | 5th | |
| 1988 | Southwest Texas State | 4–7 | 1–5 | 6th | |
| 1989 | Southwest Texas State | 5–6 | 3–3 | 3rd | |
| Southwest Texas State: | | 36–41 | 18–21 | | |
| Total: | | 36–41 | | | |
National championship Conference title Conference division title or championship game berth
