= 1985 Northwestern State Demons football team =

American college football season

1985 Northwestern State Demons football
- Conference: Gulf Star Conference
- Record: 3–8 (2–3 GSC)
- Head coach: Sam Goodwin (3rd season)
- Defensive coordinator: John Thompson (3rd season)
- Home stadium: Harry Turpin Stadium

1985 Gulf Star Conference football standings
	Conf.					Overall
Team	W		L		T	W		L		T
Stephen F. Austin +	4	–	1	–	0	9	–	2	–	0
Sam Houston State +	4	–	1	–	0	8	–	3	–	0
Nicholls State	2	–	3	–	0	6	–	5	–	0
Northwestern State	2	–	3	–	0	3	–	8	–	0
Southwest Texas State	2	–	3	–	0	3	–	8	–	0
Southeastern Louisiana	1	–	4	–	0	2	–	9	–	0
+ – Conference co-champions; This conference was a hybrid of NCAA Division II and Division I-AA Programs. Sam Houston State was classified as Division II. Stephen F. Austin was also classified as NCAA Division II. All the other teams were I-AA.

The 1985 Northwestern State Demons football team was an American football team that represented Northwestern State University during the 1985 NCAA Division I-AA football season as a member of the Gulf Star Conference (GSC). Led by third-year head coach Sam Goodwin, the Demons compiled an 3–8 record, with a mark of 2–3 in conference play, and finished tied for third in the GSC.

== Schedule ==
Date	Opponent	Site	Result	Attendance	Source
August 31	Arkansas State*	Harry Turpin Stadium; Natchitoches, LA	L 10–12	10,113	
September 7	at North Texas State*	Fouts Field; Denton, TX	L 14–34	14,400	
September 14	McNeese State*	Harry Turpin Stadium; Natchitoches, LA (rivalry)	W 14–13		
September 28	at Southern Miss*	M. M. Roberts Stadium; Hattiesburg, MS	L 7–14	18,216	
October 5	Northeast Louisiana*	Harry Turpin Stadium; Natchitoches, LA (rivalry)	L 21–45	11,710	
October 19	at Sam Houston State	Pritchett Field; Huntsville, TX	W 14–10	2,000	
October 26	vs. No. 18 Louisiana Tech*	Independence Stadium; Shreveport, LA (rivalry)	L 17–33	14,783	
November 2	at Southwest Texas State	Bobcat Stadium; San Marcos, TX	L 17–26		
November 9	at Nicholls State	John L. Guidry Stadium; Thibodaux, LA (rivalry)	W 20–14		
November 16	at Southeastern Louisiana	Strawberry Stadium; Hammond, LA (rivalry)	L 14–20	4,500	
November 23	Stephen F. Austin	Harry Turpin Stadium; Natchitoches, LA	L 10–19		
*Non-conference game; Rankings from NCAA Division I-AA Football Committee Poll released prior to the game
