= Ron Randleman =

American football player and coach (born 1941)

Biographical details
- Born: December 17, 1941 (age 84); Carlisle, Iowa, U.S.

Playing career
- 1961–1963: William Penn
- Position: Quarterback

Coaching career (HC unless noted)
- 1964–1966: Twin Cedars HS (IA)
- 1967–1968: William Penn (OC)
- 1969–1975: William Penn
- 1976–1981: Pittsburg State
- 1982–2004: Sam Houston State

Administrative career (AD unless noted)
- 1974–1976: William Penn
- 1982–1990: Sam Houston State

Head coaching record
- Overall: 218–167–6
- Bowls: 2–2
- Tournaments: 0–1 (NAIA D-II playoffs); 1–1 (NAIA D-II playoffs); 3–4 (NCAA D-I-AA playoffs)

Accomplishments and honors

Championships
- 2 IIAC (1972, 1975); 2 CSIC (1979, 1981); 2 Gulf Star (1985–1986); 3 Southland (1991, 2001, 2004)

Awards
- NAIA Division I Coach of the Year (1981); 1970 NAIA District 15 Coach of the Year; 1974 NAIA District 15 Coach of the Year; 1975 NAIA District 15 Coach of the Year; 1975 Iowa Conference Coach of the Year; 1978 Central States Conference Coach of the Year; 1981 NAIA District 10 Coach of the Year; 1981 Central States Conference Coach of the Year; 1981 Kodak District 6 College Coach of the Year; 1981 NAIA National Division I Coach of the Year; 1985 Gulf Star Conference Coach of the Year; 1986 Gulf Star Conference Coach of the Year; 1991 Southland Conference Coach of the Year; 2001 Southland Conference Coach of the Year

Ron Randleman (born December 17, 1941) is an American former football coach. He served as head coach at Sam Houston State University in Huntsville, Texas from 1982 to 2004. Randleman retired after the 2004 season as the winningest head coach in the history of the Sam Houston State Bearkats football program.

A native of Carlisle, Iowa, Randleman quarterbacked at William Penn College, where he graduated in 1964. After a short stint as head coach at Twin Cedars High School in Bussey, Iowa, Randleman returned to his alma mater as offensive coordinator. In 1969, he was promoted to head coach. He added the title of athletic director in 1974. He left the school after seven seasons with an overall record of 51–17–1, to coach at Pittsburg State University in Pittsburg, Kansas.

At Pittsburg State, Randleman turned the football program around, compiling a 36–25–2 record in six seasons. He directed the Gorillas to three Central States Conference championships and a trip to the NAIA national finals in 1981. He received coach of the year honors from his conference and his NAIA district three times. In 1981, he was named NAIA National Coach of the Year and NAIA District Six Coach of the Year. On February 5, 1982, Randleman left Pittsburg State to take over at Sam Houston State.

At the time Randleman arrived, the Sam Houston State had gone 25–67 in their last eight seasons. Randleman compiled a 131–125–3 record at Sam Houston State, while winning Conference Coach of the Year honors four times.

== Head coaching record ==
Year	Team	Overall	Conference	Standing	Bowl/playoffs
William Penn Statesmen (Iowa Intercollegiate Athletic Conference) (1969–1975)
1969	William Penn	6–3	4–3	4th	
1970	William Penn	6–3	5–2	T–2nd	
1971	William Penn	6–3	5–2	T–2nd	
1972	William Penn	9–1	6–1	T–1st	W Boot Hill Bowl
1973	William Penn	6–4	3–4	5thl	
1974	William Penn	8–2–1	6–1	2nd	L Poultry Bowl
1975	William Penn	10–1	7–0	1st	L NAIA Division II Semifinal
William Penn:		51–17–1	36–13		
Pittsburg State Gorillas (Central States Intercollegiate Conference) (1976–1981)
1976	Pittsburg State	3–5–1	1–4	T–5th	
1977	Pittsburg State	1–8–1	1–5–1	T–6th	
1978	Pittsburg State	7–3	6–1		
1979	Pittsburg State	8–3	6–1	T–1st	W Boot Hill Bowl
1980	Pittsburg State	7–4	5–2	2nd	L Moila Shrine Classic
1981	Pittsburg State	10–2	7–0	1st	L NAIA Division I Championship
Pittsburg State:		36–25–2	26–13–1		
Sam Houston State Bearkats (Lone Star Conference) (1982–1983)
1982	Sam Houston State	3–8	1–5	8th	
1983	Sam Houston State	4–7	1–6	7th	
Sam Houston State Bearkats (Gulf Star Conference) (1984–1986)
1984	Sam Houston State	8–3	3–2	3rd	
1985	Sam Houston State	8–3	4–1	T–1st	
1986	Sam Houston State	9–3	3–1	1st	L NCAA Division I-AA First Round
Sam Houston State Bearkats (Southland Conference) (1987–2004)
1987	Sam Houston State	8–3	5–1	T–2nd	
1988	Sam Houston State	3–8	0–6	7th	
1989	Sam Houston State	3–8	2–4	T–5th	
1990	Sam Houston State	4–7	3–3	T–3rd	
1991	Sam Houston State	8–3–1	5–2	T–1st	L NCAA Division I-AA First Round
1992	Sam Houston State	6–3–2	3–2–2	3rd	
1993	Sam Houston State	4–7	2–5	T–5th	
1994	Sam Houston State	6–5	1–5	T–5th	
1995	Sam Houston State	5–5	2–3	T–3rd	
1996	Sam Houston State	4–7	3–3	T–3rd	
1997	Sam Houston State	5–6	3–4	T–4th	
1998	Sam Houston State	3–8	1–6	8th	
1999	Sam Houston State	6–5	4–3	4th	
2000	Sam Houston State	7–4	4–3	4th	
2001	Sam Houston State	10–3	5–1	T–1st	L NCAA Division I-AA Quarterfinal
2002	Sam Houston State	4–7	2–4	T–5th	
2003	Sam Houston State	2–9	1–4	4th	
2004	Sam Houston State	11–3	4–1	T–1st	L NCAA Division I-AA Semifinal
Sam Houston State:		131–125–3	62–75–2		
Total:		218–167–1			
National championship Conference title Conference division title or championship game berth

== See also ==
- List of college football career coaching wins leaders
