= 1985 Southwest Texas State Bobcats football team =

American college football season

1985 Southwest Texas State Bobcats football
- Conference: Gulf Star Conference
- Record: 3–8 (2–3 GSC)
- Head coach: John O'Hara (3rd season)
- Home stadium: Bobcat Stadium

1985 Gulf Star Conference football standings
	Conf.					Overall
Team	W		L		T	W		L		T
Stephen F. Austin +	4	–	1	–	0	9	–	2	–	0
Sam Houston State +	4	–	1	–	0	8	–	3	–	0
Nicholls State	2	–	3	–	0	6	–	5	–	0
Northwestern State	2	–	3	–	0	3	–	8	–	0
Southwest Texas State	2	–	3	–	0	3	–	8	–	0
Southeastern Louisiana	1	–	4	–	0	2	–	9	–	0
+ – Conference co-champions; This conference was a hybrid of NCAA Division II and Division I-AA Programs. Sam Houston State was classified as Division II. Stephen F. Austin was also classified as NCAA Division II. All the other teams were I-AA.

The 1985 Southwest Texas State Bobcats football team was an American football team that represented Southwest Texas State University (now known as Texas State University) during the 1985 NCAA Division I-AA football season as a member of the Gulf Star Conference (GSC). In their third year under head coach John O'Hara, the team compiled an overall record of 3–8 with a mark of 2–3 in conference play.

== Schedule ==
Date	Opponent	Site	Result	Attendance	Source
September 7	at Texas A&I*	Javelina Stadium; Kingsville, TX	L 7–30		
September 14	at East Carolina*	Ficklen Memorial Stadium; Greenville, NC	L 16–27	28,411	
September 21	Lamar*	Bobcat Stadium; San Marcos, TX	L 21–24		
September 28	UT Arlington*	Bobcat Stadium; San Marcos, TX	L 16–19		
October 5	at UCF*	Florida Citrus Bowl; Orlando, FL	W 48–12	7,850	
October 19	at McNeese State*	Cowboy Stadium; Lake Charles, LA	L 0–28		
October 26	at Nicholls State	John L. Guidry Stadium; Thibodaux, LA (rivalry)	L 12–20		
November 2	Northwestern State	Bobcat Stadium; San Marcos, TX	W 26–17		
November 9	Southeastern Louisiana	Bobcat Stadium; San Marcos, TX	W 55–15		
November 16	at Stephen F. Austin	Lumberjack Stadium; Nacogdoches, TX	L 21–43	1,000	
November 23	Sam Houston State	Bobcat Stadium; San Marcos, TX (rivalry)	L 25–27		
*Non-conference game
