= 1985 Northeast Louisiana Indians football team =

American college football season

1985 Northeast Louisiana Indians football
- Conference: Southland Conference
- Record: 6–5 (3–3 SLC)
- Head coach: Pat Collins (5th season)
- Home stadium: Malone Stadium

1985 Southland Conference football standings
	Conf.					Overall
Team	W		L		T	W		L		T
No. 6 Arkansas State $^	5	–	1	–	0	9	–	4	–	0
No. 14 Louisiana Tech	4	–	2	–	0	8	–	3	–	0
McNeese State	3	–	1	–	2	6	–	3	–	2
Northeast Louisiana	3	–	3	–	0	6	–	5	–	0
North Texas State	2	–	3	–	1	4	–	6	–	1
UT Arlington	2	–	3	–	1	4	–	6	–	1
Lamar	0	–	6	–	0	2	–	9	–	0
$ – Conference champion; ^ – NCAA Division I-AA playoff participant; Rankings from NCAA Division I-AA Football Committee poll

The 1985 Northeast Louisiana Indians football team was an American football team that represented Northeast Louisiana University (now known as the University of Louisiana at Monroe) as part of the Southland Conference during the 1985 NCAA Division I-AA football season. In their fifth year under head coach Pat Collins, the team compiled a 6–5 record.

== Schedule ==
Date	Opponent	Site	Result	Attendance	Source
September 14	Delta State*	Malone Stadium; Monroe, LA	W 27–7		
September 21	at Texas A&M*	Kyle Field; College Station, TX	L 17–31	46,851	
September 28	Nicholls State*	Malone Stadium; Monroe, LA	W 17–15		
October 5	at Northwestern State*	Harry Turpin Stadium; Natchitoches, LA (rivalry)	W 45–21	11,710	
October 12	at Lamar	Cardinal Stadium; Beaumont, TX	W 37–14		
October 19	at Southeastern Louisiana*	Strawberry Stadium; Hammond, LA	L 17–19		
October 26	at UT Arlington	Maverick Stadium; Arlington, TX	L 13–27	5,370	
November 2	McNeese State	Malone Stadium; Monroe, LA	L 0–10		
November 9	at Louisiana Tech	Joe Aillet Stadium; Ruston, LA (rivalry)	W 13–9		
November 16	North Texas State	Malone Stadium; Monroe, LA	W 18–17	12,851	
November 23	Arkansas State	Malone Stadium; Monroe, LA	L 23–31		
*Non-conference game
