= 1984 Southwest Texas State Bobcats football team =

American college football season

1984 Southwest Texas State Bobcats football
- Conference: Gulf Star Conference
- Record: 7–4 (2–3 GSC)
- Head coach: John O'Hara (2nd season)
- Home stadium: Bobcat Stadium

1984 Gulf Star Conference football standings
	Conf.					Overall
Team	W		L		T	W		L		T
Northwestern State +	4	–	1	–	0	7	–	4	–	0
Nicholls State +	4	–	1	–	0	6	–	5	–	0
Sam Houston State	3	–	2	–	0	8	–	3	–	0
Southwest Texas State	2	–	3	–	0	7	–	4	–	0
Stephen F. Austin	1	–	3	–	1	7	–	3	–	1
Southeastern Louisiana	0	–	4	–	1	2	–	8	–	1
$ – Conference champion; The conference was a hybrid of NCAA Division I-AA and Division II programs. Stephen F. Austin was classified NCAA Division II. Sam Houston State was classified as Division II. All the other teams were I-AA. All the other teams were Division I-AA.

The 1984 Southwest Texas State Bobcats football team was an American football team that represented Southwest Texas State University (now known as Texas State University) during the 1984 NCAA Division I-AA football season as a member of the Gulf Star Conference (GSC). In their second year under head coach John O'Hara, the team compiled an overall record of 7–4 with a mark of 2–3 in conference play.

== Schedule ==
Date	Opponent	Rank	Site	Result	Attendance	Source
September 1	at Wichita State*		Cessna Stadium; Wichita, KS	W 38–31	27,481	
September 8	Texas A&I*		Bobcat Stadium; San Marcos, TX	W 28–0	14,421	
September 22	at UT Arlington*	No. 18	Maverick Stadium; Arlington, TX	L 13–48	9,048	
September 29	UCF*		Bobcat Stadium; San Marcos, TX	W 39–13	10,337	
October 6	at Northwestern State		Harry Turpin Stadium; Natchitoches, LA	L 7–28		
October 13	at Lamar*		Cardinal Stadium; Beaumont, TX	W 23–0		
October 20	at Southeastern Louisiana		Strawberry Stadium; Hammond, LA	W 10–7	5,500	
October 27	at North Texas State*		Fouts Field; Denton, TX	W 27–19		
November 3	Stephen F. Austin		Bobcat Stadium; San Marcos, TX	W 24–7	14,057	
November 10	Nicholls State		Bobcat Stadium; San Marcos, TX (rivalry)	L 14–30		
November 17	at Sam Houston State		Pritchett Field; Huntsville, TX (rivalry)	L 17–21		
*Non-conference game; Rankings from NCAA Division I-AA Football Committee poll
