= 1984 Sam Houston State Bearkats football team =

American college football season

1984 Sam Houston State Bearkats football
- Conference: Gulf Star Conference
- Record: 8–3 (3–2 GSC)
- Head coach: Ron Randleman (3rd season)
- Home stadium: Pritchett Field

1984 Gulf Star Conference football standings
	Conf.					Overall
Team	W		L		T	W		L		T
Northwestern State +	4	–	1	–	0	7	–	4	–	0
Nicholls State +	4	–	1	–	0	6	–	5	–	0
Sam Houston State	3	–	2	–	0	8	–	3	–	0
Southwest Texas State	2	–	3	–	0	7	–	4	–	0
Stephen F. Austin	1	–	3	–	1	7	–	3	–	1
Southeastern Louisiana	0	–	4	–	1	2	–	8	–	1
$ – Conference champion; The conference was a hybrid of NCAA Division I-AA and Division II programs. Stephen F. Austin was classified NCAA Division II. Sam Houston State was classified as Division II. All the other teams were I-AA. All the other teams were Division I-AA.

The 1984 Sam Houston State Bearkats football team represented Sam Houston State University as a member of the Gulf Star Conference (GSC) during the 1984 NCAA Division I-AA football season. Led by third-year head coach Ron Randleman, the Bearkats compiled an overall record of 8–3 with a mark of 3–2 in conference play, and finished third in the GSC.

== Schedule ==
Date	Opponent	Site	Result	Attendance	Source
September 8	Bishop*	Pritchett Field; Huntsville, TX	W 40–7	6,000	
September 13	Stephen F. Austin	Pritchett Field; Huntsville, TX (Battle of the Piney Woods)	W 20–7	8,000	
September 22	at Southwestern Oklahoma State*	Milam Stadium; Weatherford, OK	W 44–6	2,000	
September 27	at Nicholls State	John L. Guidry Stadium; Thibodaux, LA	L 6–24	9,040	
October 4	Southeastern Louisiana	Pritchett Field; Huntsville, TX	W 28–3	4,200	
October 13	at East Texas State*	Memorial Stadium; Commerce, TX	W 24–18	750	
October 20	Lamar*	Pritchett Field; Huntsville, TX	W 27–11	8,000	
October 27	at Northwestern State	Harry Turpin Stadium; Natchitoches, LA	L 7–38	6,300	
November 3	at Abilene Christian*	Shotwell Stadium; Abilene, TX	W 10–6	5,000	
November 10	at Angelo State*	San Angelo Stadium; San Angelo, TX	L 7–52	6,500	
November 17	Southwest Texas State	Pritchett Field; Huntsville, TX (rivalry)	W 21–17	4,500	
*Non-conference game
