= 1984 Stephen F. Austin Lumberjacks football team =

American college football season

1984 Stephen F. Austin Lumberjacks football
- Conference: Gulf Star Conference
- Record: 7–3–1 (1–3–1 GSC)
- Head coach: Jim Hess (3rd season)
- Home stadium: Lumberjack Stadium

1984 Gulf Star Conference football standings
	Conf.					Overall
Team	W		L		T	W		L		T
Northwestern State +	4	–	1	–	0	7	–	4	–	0
Nicholls State +	4	–	1	–	0	6	–	5	–	0
Sam Houston State	3	–	2	–	0	8	–	3	–	0
Southwest Texas State	2	–	3	–	0	7	–	4	–	0
Stephen F. Austin	1	–	3	–	1	7	–	3	–	1
Southeastern Louisiana	0	–	4	–	1	2	–	8	–	1
$ – Conference champion; The conference was a hybrid of NCAA Division I-AA and Division II programs. Stephen F. Austin was classified NCAA Division II. Sam Houston State was classified as Division II. All the other teams were I-AA. All the other teams were Division I-AA.

The 1984 Stephen F. Austin Lumberjacks football team was an American football team that represented Stephen F. Austin State University during the 1984 NCAA Division II football season as a member of the Gulf Star Conference (GSC). Led by third-year head coach Jim Hess, the Lumberjacks compiled an 7–3–1 record, with a mark of 1–3–1 in conference play, and finished fifth in the GSC.

== Schedule ==
Date	Opponent	Site	Result	Attendance	Source
September 1	Delta State*	Lumberjack Stadium; Nacogdoches, TX	W 17–10		
September 8	Prairie View A&M*	Lumberjack Stadium; Nacogdoches, TX	W 43–14		
September 13	at Sam Houston State	Pritchett Field; Huntsville, TX (rivalry)	L 7–20	8,000	
September 22	Texas A&I*	Lumberjack Stadium; Nacogdoches, TX	W 17–0		
September 29	at Abilene Christian*	Shotwell Stadium; Abilene, TX	W 37–21		
October 6	at UT Arlington*	Maverick Stadium; Arlington, TX	W 27–13		
October 13	Howard Payne*	Lumberjack Stadium; Nacogdoches, TX	W 38–0		
October 20	Nicholls State	Lumberjack Stadium; Nacogdoches, TX	L 21–25		
October 27	at Southeastern Louisiana	Strawberry Stadium; Hammond, LA	T 21–21	7,000	
November 3	at Southwest Texas State	Bobcat Stadium; San Marcos, TX	L 7–24	14,057	
November 17	Northwestern State	Lumberjack Stadium; Nacogdoches, TX (rivalry)	W 22–18		
*Non-conference game
