= 1984 Louisiana Tech Bulldogs football team =

American college football season

1984 Louisiana Tech Bulldogs football

Southland champion NCAA Division I-AA runner-up

NCAA Division I-AA Championship Game, L 6–19 vs. Montana State
- Conference: Southland Conference
- Record: 10–5 (5–1 Southland)
- Head coach: A. L. Williams (2nd season)
- Captains: Aldon Kelly; Karl Terrebonne
- Home stadium: Joe Aillet Stadium

1984 Southland Conference football standings
| | Conf. | | | | | Overall |
| Team | W | | L | | T | W | | L | | T |
|---|---|---|---|---|---|---|---|---|---|---|
| No. 9 Louisiana Tech $^ | 5 | – | 1 | – | 0 | 10 | – | 5 | – | 0 |
| No. 10 Arkansas State ^ | 4 | – | 1 | – | 1 | 8 | – | 4 | – | 1 |
| UT Arlington | 4 | – | 2 | – | 0 | 7 | – | 4 | – | 0 |
| Northeast Louisiana | 3 | – | 3 | – | 0 | 7 | – | 4 | – | 0 |
| No. 20 McNeese State | 2 | – | 3 | – | 1 | 7 | – | 3 | – | 1 |
| Lamar | 1 | – | 5 | – | 0 | 2 | – | 9 | – | 0 |
| North Texas State | 1 | – | 5 | – | 0 | 2 | – | 9 | – | 0 |
$ – Conference champion; ^ – NCAA Division I-AA playoff participant; Rankings from NCAA Division I-AA Football Committee poll

The 1984 Louisiana Tech Bulldogs football team was an American football team that represented Louisiana Tech University as a member of the Southland Conference during the 1984 NCAA Division I-AA football season. In their second year under head coach A. L. Williams, the team compiled a 10–5 record and finished as Southland Conference champion and NCAA Division I-AA Runner-Up.

== Schedule ==
| Date | Opponent | Rank | Site | TV | Result | Attendance | Source |
|---|---|---|---|---|---|---|---|
| September 1 | at Southeastern Louisiana* | | Strawberry Stadium; Hammond, LA | | W 17–9 | 6,000 | |
| September 8 | Southwestern Louisiana* | | Joe Aillet Stadium; Ruston, LA (rivalry) | | L 16–17 | 16,800 | |
| September 15 | at Southern Miss* | | M. M. Roberts Stadium; Hattiesburg, MS (Rivalry in Dixie) | | L 0–34 | 28,342 | |
| September 22 | at Ole Miss* | | Vaught–Hemingway Stadium; Oxford, MS | | L 8–14 | 28,413 | |
| September 29 | North Texas State | | Joe Aillet Stadium; Ruston, LA | | W 17–12 | 15,400 | |
| October 6 | at No. 2 McNeese State | | Cowboy Stadium; Lake Charles, LA | | W 24–17 | 20,000 | |
| October 13 | No. 9 Arkansas State | | Joe Aillet Stadium; Ruston, LA | | W 20–10 | 15,200 | |
| October 20 | vs. Northwestern State* | No. 17т | Independence Stadium; Shreveport, LA (rivalry) | | W 5–0 | 9,424 | |
| October 27 | at Lamar | No. 14 | Cardinal Stadium; Beaumont, TX | | W 22–7 | 4,114 | |
| November 3 | at No. 10 Northeast Louisiana | No. 9 | Malone Stadium; Monroe, LA (rivalry) | | L 10–12 | | |
| November 10 | UT Arlington | No. 20т | Joe Aillet Stadium; Ruston, LA | | W 34–0 | 14,200 | |
| November 24 | No. 6 Mississippi Valley State* | No. 9 | Joe Aillet Stadium; Ruston, LA (NCAA Division I-AA First Round) | | W 66–19 | 17,500 | |
| December 1 | at No. 1 Alcorn State* | No. 9 | Mississippi Veterans Memorial Stadium; Jackson, MS (NCAA Division I-AA Quarterfinal) | | W 44–21 | 16,204 | |
| December 8 | at No. 7 Middle Tennessee State* | No. 9 | Johnny "Red" Floyd Stadium; Murfreesboro, TN (NCAA Division I-AA Semifinal) | | W 21–13 | 11,000 | |
| December 15 | vs. No. 2 Montana State* | No. 9 | Johnson Hagood Stadium; Charleston, SC (NCAA Division I-AA Championship Game) | SPN | L 6–19 | 9,125 | |
*Non-conference game; Rankings from NCAA Division I-AA Football Committee Poll released prior to the game
