= Oscar Lofton =

American football player and coach (1938–2026)

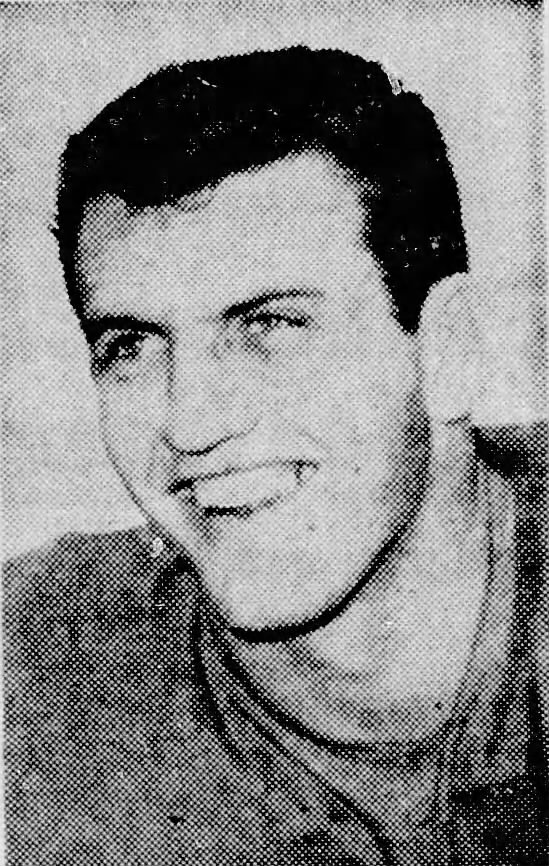
- Lofton, c. 1965

Biographical details
- Born: April 21, 1938; McCall Creek, Mississippi, U.S.
- Died: January 4, 2026 (aged 87)

Playing career

Football
- 1957–1959: Southeastern Louisiana
- 1960: Boston Patriots

Basketball
- 1957–1959: Southeastern Louisiana
- Position: End (football)

Coaching career (HC unless noted)
- 1962–1966: Holy Cross (assistant)
- 1967–1972: Hammond HS
- 1973–1978: Tulane (assistant)
- 1980–1985: Southeastern Louisiana

Head coaching record
- Overall: 30–34–1

Oscar Warren Lofton (April 2, 1938 – January 4, 2026) was an American football player and coach. He played collegiately for the Southeastern Louisiana Lions and professionally as an end for the Boston Patriots of the American Football League (AFL). With the Patriots, Lofton scored the team's second ever touchdown. He became a coach, serving as the head coach for Southeastern Louisiana from 1980 to 1985, compiling a record of 30–34–1. After the end of his coaching career, Lofton became a scout in the National Football League (NFL).

== Early life ==
Oscar Warren Lofton was born in McCall Creek, Mississippi, on April 2, 1938, to Charlie and Ruby Lofton. His father worked as a pipefitter with Exxon. Lofton grew up in Baton Rouge, Louisiana and attended Istrouma High School, where he was a four-sport letterman. As a forward, Lofton played under head coach James Brown, whose 1955 team had a record of 12–0–1 and won the 3A state championship.

== Collegiate career ==
At Southeastern Louisiana University, Lofton competed on the football, basketball, and track and field teams. Lofton joined the university in 1957, and played for three seasons as a tight end in football. He was seen as one of the most improved freshman during his rookie year, returning 11 catches for 292 yards. The team won a conference championship in 1960. Lofton was named an all-Conference tight end in 1957 and 1958, all-Conference receiver in 1958 and 1959, and came second place for the SLU PLayer of the Year award his junior season. He earned his Bachelor of Arts degree from Southeastern in 1960, and would later be awarded a Masters of Education in 1965.

== Professional career ==
Lofton signed with the Boston Patriots of the American Football League (AFL) in 1960 as an end. He scored the second touchdown in franchise history on a 60-yard pass play on July 30, 1960, in a preseason game against the Buffalo Bills. After playing with the Patriots for two years, Lofton was drafted and served with the United States Army. (Note: One source from 1976 states he served for 21 months while another from 2007 states he served for only 18.) While in the military Lofton continued to play football with the army, serving as a player-coach. Lofton returned to play for the Patriots in 1963 but suffered a hamstring injury in training camp and left the team.

== Coaching career ==
After leaving the Patriots, Lofton was signed by the Holy Cross Crusaders as an end coach. Patriots head coach Mike Holovak had set him up with the university. While coaching, Lofton played with the Springfield Acorns. Lofton also coached the receivers from 1963 until 1964, and the offensive line from 1965 until 1966. During this time is when Lofton decided that coaching would be his career going forward.

Lofton joined Hammond High School near his hometown in Louisiana as head coach in 1967 to near-immediate success. He was awarded District Coach of the Year three years in a row from 1969 through 1971. He followed up his first three years of coaching with an undefeated season in 1970 culminating in a state championship win. His efforts led to him being awarded State AAA Coach of the Year in 1970. He finished six seasons at Hammond with a 53–15–3 record with only two of those losses coming from teams within the district.

The University of Tulane hired Lofton as their freshman team coach in 1973. He also signed on as the tight end coach. He had turned down another offer to join Charlie McClendon at Louisiana State University for the opportunity at Tulane. He moved up to the varsity coaching staff in 1976, and became offensive coordinator the following year.

Lofton became the athletic director for his alma mater Southeastern Louisiana University in 1979. Soon afterward in December of that year, Lofton stepped down from his director position to become head coach of the football team at SLU. He earned Louisiana Coach of the Year for his second season with the team in 1981. The following two seasons with the team were more lackluster, with SLU going 4–7 on 1982. Lofton had even less success with the team's move to the Gulf Star Conference, amassing only four wins in 2 seasons. His final coaching record at Southeastern Louisiana was 30–34–1. Lofton was fired in November 1985. SLU discontinued its football team following Lofton's departure after failing to raise enough money to save the program, in a decision Lofton was outspokenly against. Southeastern would reinstate the program in 2003 under head coach Hal Mumme.

== Scouting career ==
After being hired as head coach at Southeastern, Lofton began working with the NFL Scouting Combine. Reportedly, Lofton's reports led to the first four draft picks in the 1987 draft. He was hired by the San Francisco 49ers in 1992 to serve as a scout. After 15 years with the team and one Super Bowl championship in 1995, Lofton retired with the 49ers in 2007.

== Personal life and death ==
Lofton married Billie Jean on February 12, 1961. They stayed together until his death, and had three children. He died on January 6, 2026, at the age of 87.

== Head coaching record ==
Year	Team	Overall	Conference	Standing	Bowl/playoffs
Southeastern Louisiana Lions (NCAA Division I-AA independent) (1980–1983)
1980	Southeastern Louisiana	8–2			
1981	Southeastern Louisiana	8–3			
1982	Southeastern Louisiana	4–7			
1983	Southeastern Louisiana	6–5			
Southeastern Louisiana Lions (Gulf Star Conference) (1984–1985)
1984	Southeastern Louisiana	2–8–1	0–4–1	6th	
1985	Southeastern Louisiana	2–9	1–4	6th	
Southeastern Louisiana:		30–34–1	1–8–1		
Total:		30–34–1			
