= 1984 Southeastern Louisiana Lions football team =

American college football season

1984 Southeastern Louisiana Lions football
- Conference: Gulf Star Conference
- Record: 2–8–1 (0–4–1 GSC)
- Head coach: Oscar Lofton (5th season)
- Home stadium: Strawberry Stadium

1984 Gulf Star Conference football standings
	Conf.					Overall
Team	W		L		T	W		L		T
Northwestern State +	4	–	1	–	0	7	–	4	–	0
Nicholls State +	4	–	1	–	0	6	–	5	–	0
Sam Houston State	3	–	2	–	0	8	–	3	–	0
Southwest Texas State	2	–	3	–	0	7	–	4	–	0
Stephen F. Austin	1	–	3	–	1	7	–	3	–	1
Southeastern Louisiana	0	–	4	–	1	2	–	8	–	1
$ – Conference champion; The conference was a hybrid of NCAA Division I-AA and Division II programs. Stephen F. Austin was classified NCAA Division II. Sam Houston State was classified as Division II. All the other teams were I-AA. All the other teams were Division I-AA.

The 1984 Southeastern Louisiana Lions football team was an American football team that represented Southeastern Louisiana University during the 1984 NCAA Division I-AA football season as a member of the Gulf Star Conference (GSC). Led by fifth-year head coach Oscar Lofton, the team compiled an overall record of 2–8–1 with a mark of 0–4–1 in conference play.

== Schedule ==
Date	Opponent	Site	Result	Attendance	Source
September 1	Louisiana Tech*	Strawberry Stadium; Hammond, LA	L 9–17	6,000	
September 8	at McNeese State*	Cowboy Stadium; Lake Charles, LA	L 7–28	19,000	
September 15	Mississippi College*	Strawberry Stadium; Hammond, LA	L 6–7	5,000	
September 29	Western Kentucky*	Strawberry Stadium; Hammond, LA	W 28–0	5,500	
October 4	at Sam Houston State	Pritchett Field; Huntsville, TX	L 3–28	4,200	
October 13	at Northeast Louisiana*	Malone Stadium; Monroe, LA	L 15–30	20,222	
October 20	Southwest Texas State	Strawberry Stadium; Hammond, LA	L 7–10	5,500	
October 27	Stephen F. Austin^{†}	Strawberry Stadium; Hammond, LA	T 21–21	7,000	
November 3	at Southwest Missouri State*	Briggs Stadium; Springfield, MO	W 30–24	3,780	
November 10	Northwestern State	Strawberry Stadium; Hammond, LA (rivalry)	L 14–34	4,000	
November 17	at Nicholls State	John L. Guidry Stadium; Thibodaux, LA (rivalry)	L 7–36	10,015	
*Non-conference game; ^{†}Homecoming
