= 1985 Southeastern Louisiana Lions football team =

American college football season

1985 Southeastern Louisiana Lions football
- Conference: Gulf Star Conference
- Record: 2–9 (1–4 GSC)
- Head coach: Oscar Lofton (6th season)
- Home stadium: Strawberry Stadium

1985 Gulf Star Conference football standings
	Conf.					Overall
Team	W		L		T	W		L		T
Stephen F. Austin +	4	–	1	–	0	9	–	2	–	0
Sam Houston State +	4	–	1	–	0	8	–	3	–	0
Nicholls State	2	–	3	–	0	6	–	5	–	0
Northwestern State	2	–	3	–	0	3	–	8	–	0
Southwest Texas State	2	–	3	–	0	3	–	8	–	0
Southeastern Louisiana	1	–	4	–	0	2	–	9	–	0
+ – Conference co-champions; This conference was a hybrid of NCAA Division II and Division I-AA Programs. Sam Houston State was classified as Division II. Stephen F. Austin was also classified as NCAA Division II. All the other teams were I-AA.

The 1985 Southeastern Louisiana Lions football team was an American football team that represented Southeastern Louisiana University during the 1985 NCAA Division I-AA football season as a member of the Gulf Star Conference (GSC). Led by sixth-year head coach Oscar Lofton, the team compiled an overall record of 2–9 with a mark of 1–4 in conference play.

Citing financial losses, in January 1986, football at Southeastern Louisiana was disbanded. The football program was subsequently reinstated in May 2002, and restarted play in 2003.

== Schedule ==
Date	Opponent	Site	Result	Attendance	Source
September 7	McNeese State*	Strawberry Stadium; Hammond, LA	L 7–14	7,500	
September 13	at UCF*	Florida Citrus Bowl; Orlando, FL	L 21–27	7,142	
September 21	Mississippi College*	Strawberry Stadium; Hammond, LA	L 30–34	6,000	
September 28	at No. 20 Louisiana Tech*	Joe Aillet Stadium; Ruston, LA	L 7–40	18,224	
October 5	at Chattanooga*	Chamberlain Field; Chattanooga, TN	L 7–27	9,148	
October 12	Sam Houston State	Strawberry Stadium; Hammond, LA	L 13–24	5,500	
October 19	Northeast Louisiana*^{†}	Strawberry Stadium; Hammond, LA	W 19–17	8,000	
November 2	at Stephen F. Austin	Lumberjack Stadium; Nacogdoches, TX	L 12–27	3,000	
November 9	at Southwest Texas State	Bobcat Stadium; San Marcos, TX	L 15–55	6,012	
November 16	Northwestern State	Strawberry Stadium; Hammond, LA (rivalry)	W 20–14	4,500	
November 23	Nicholls State	Strawberry Stadium; Hammond, LA (rivalry)	L 17–21	7,500	
*Non-conference game; ^{†}Homecoming; Rankings from NCAA Division I-AA Football Committee Poll released prior to the game
