= Farmersville High School (Texas) =

Public school in Texas, United States

Location
- 499 State Highway 78; Farmersville, Collin County, Texas 75442-0472; United States; 33.1699°N 96.3684°W

Information
- Type: Co-Educational, Public, Secondary
- School district: Farmersville Independent School District
- Principal: Dave Warren
- Teaching staff: 49.76 (FTE)
- Grades: 9-12
- Enrollment: 765 (2024-2025)
- Student to teacher ratio: 15.37
- Colors: Purple & Gold
- Athletics conference: UIL Class AAAA (4A)
- Mascot: Fightin' Farmers/Lady Farmers
- Website: highschool.farmersvilleisd.net

Farmersville High School is a public high school located in Farmersville, Texas, United States. It is part of the Farmersville Independent School District located in eastern Collin County and, as of the 2024-2026 realignment, is classified as a 4A school by the UIL. The school is located on the northwest side of the city of Farmersville. For the 2021-2022 school year, the school received a rating of "B" from the Texas Education Agency.

== Athletics ==
The Farmersville Farmers compete in the following sports:

- Baseball
- Basketball
- Cross Country
- Football
- Golf
- Powerlifting
- Softball
- Soccer
- Tennis
- Track and Field
- Volleyball

=== State titles ===
- Football
  - 2007(2A/D1)
- One Act Play
  - 1975(1A)

== Notable alumni ==
- Jim Hess, former college coach and NFL scout
- Tex Watson, murderer and member of the Manson Family; Watson was an honor student, captain of the football team, and set a state record for high hurdles
