= Sam Goodwin (American football) =

American football coach and administrator (1944–2026)

Biographical details
- Born: January 20, 1944; Pineville, Louisiana, U.S.
- Died: March 20, 2026 (aged 82)

Playing career
- 1962–1965: Henderson State
- Position: Guard

Coaching career (HC unless noted)
- 1966–1967: Forest Heights Junior High (Little Rock, AR)
- 1968–1969: Little Rock Hall HS (AR)
- 1970–1978: Little Rock Parkview HS (AR)
- 1979–1980: Southern Arkansas
- 1981–1982: Arkansas (assistant)
- 1983–1999: Northwestern State
- 2010–2012: De Queen HS (AR)
- 2013: Pineville HS (LA) (assistant)
- 2014–2015: Alexandria HS (LA)

Administrative career (AD unless noted)
- 2000–2010: Henderson State

Head coaching record
- Overall: 111–99–4 (college); 89–58–4 (high school)
- Tournaments: 3–3 (NCAA D-I-AA playoffs)

Accomplishments and honors

Championships
- 1 Gulf Star (1983); 3 Southland (1988, 1997–1998); 5 AAA state

Awards
- Arkansas Sports Hall of Fame; NSU N-Club Hall of Fame; Southland Conference Hall of Honor

Sam Goodwin (January 20, 1944 – March 20, 2026) was an American football coach and athletic director. He served as the head football coach at Southern Arkansas University from 1979 to 1980 and at Northwestern State University in Natchitoches, Louisiana from 1983 to 1999, compiling a career college football coaching record of 111–99–4.

Goodwin died on March 20, 2026, at the age of 82.

== Head coaching record ==
=== College ===
Year	Team	Overall	Conference	Standing	Bowl/playoffs	NCAA^{#}	TSN^{°}
Southern Arkansas Muleriders (Arkansas Intercollegiate Conference) (1979–1980)
1979	Southern Arkansas	3–6–1	1–4–1	7th			
1980	Southern Arkansas	6–5	5–1	2nd			
Southern Arkansas:		9–11–1	6–5–1				
Northwestern State Demons (NCAA Division I-AA independent) (1983)
1983	Northwestern State	4–7					
Northwestern State Demons (Gulf Star Conference) (1984–1986)
1984	Northwestern State	7–4	4–1	T–1st			
1985	Northwestern State	3–8	2–3	T–3rd			
1986	Northwestern State	5–5–1	2–2	T–2nd			
Northwestern State Demons (Southland Conference / Southland Football League) (1987–1999)
1987	Northwestern State	6–5	3–3	4th			
1988	Northwestern State	10–3	6–0	1st	L NCAA Division I-AA Quarterfinal	8	
1989	Northwestern State	4–5–2	3–1–2	2nd			
1990	Northwestern State	5–6	3–3	T–3rd			
1991	Northwestern State	6–5	4–3	T–4th			
1992	Northwestern State	7–4	4–3	T–3rd			
1993	Northwestern State	5–6	3–4	4th			
1994	Northwestern State	5–6	3–3	4th			
1995	Northwestern State	6–5	2–3	T–3rd			
1996	Northwestern State	6–5	3–3	T–3rd			
1997	Northwestern State	8–4	6–1	T–1st	L NCAA Division I-AA First Round		21
1998	Northwestern State	11–3	6–1	1st	L NCAA Division I-AA Semifinal		3
1999	Northwestern State	4–7	3–4	5th			
Northwestern State:		102–88–3	57–38–2				
Total:		111–99–4					
National championship Conference title Conference division title or championship game berth
