= 1984 Northeast Louisiana Indians football team =

American college football season

1984 Northeast Louisiana Indians football
- Conference: Southland Conference
- Record: 7–4 (3–3 SLC)
- Head coach: Pat Collins (4th season)
- Home stadium: Malone Stadium

1984 Southland Conference football standings
	Conf.					Overall
Team	W		L		T	W		L		T
No. 9 Louisiana Tech $^	5	–	1	–	0	10	–	5	–	0
No. 10 Arkansas State ^	4	–	1	–	1	8	–	4	–	1
UT Arlington	4	–	2	–	0	7	–	4	–	0
Northeast Louisiana	3	–	3	–	0	7	–	4	–	0
No. 20 McNeese State	2	–	3	–	1	7	–	3	–	1
Lamar	1	–	5	–	0	2	–	9	–	0
North Texas State	1	–	5	–	0	2	–	9	–	0
$ – Conference champion; ^ – NCAA Division I-AA playoff participant; Rankings from NCAA Division I-AA Football Committee poll

The 1984 Northeast Louisiana Indians football team was an American football team that represented Northeast Louisiana University (now known as the University of Louisiana at Monroe) as part of the Southland Conference during the 1984 NCAA Division I-AA football season. In their fourth year under head coach Pat Collins, the team compiled a 7–4 record.

== Schedule ==
Date	Opponent	Site	Result	Attendance	Source
September 1	at Nicholls State*	John L. Guidry Stadium; Thibodaux, LA	W 13–6		
September 8	UCF*	Malone Stadium; Monroe, LA	W 49–21	19,329	
September 15	at Southwestern Louisiana*	Cajun Field; Lafayette, LA	W 7–6	23,531	
September 29	Northwestern State*	Malone Stadium; Monroe, LA (rivalry)	L 10–27	18,553	
October 6	Lamar	Malone Stadium; Monroe, LA	W 34–14		
October 13	Southeastern Louisiana*	Malone Stadium; Monroe, LA	W 30–15		
October 20	UT Arlington	Malone Stadium; Monroe, LA	L 7–9	5,111	
October 27	at McNeese State	Cowboy Stadium; Lake Charles, LA	W 19–3		
November 3	Louisiana Tech	Malone Stadium; Monroe, LA (rivalry)	W 12–10		
November 10	at North Texas State	Fouts Field; Denton, TX	L 3–10	11,900	
November 17	at Arkansas State	Indian Stadium; Jonesboro, AR	L 14–38		
*Non-conference game
