= 1985 Nicholls State Colonels football team =

American college football season

1985 Nicholls State Colonels football
- Conference: Gulf Star Conference
- Record: 6–5 (2–3 Gulf Star)
- Head coach: Sonny Jackson (5th season)
- Home stadium: John L. Guidry Stadium

1985 Gulf Star Conference football standings
	Conf.					Overall
Team	W		L		T	W		L		T
Stephen F. Austin +	4	–	1	–	0	9	–	2	–	0
Sam Houston State +	4	–	1	–	0	8	–	3	–	0
Nicholls State	2	–	3	–	0	6	–	5	–	0
Northwestern State	2	–	3	–	0	3	–	8	–	0
Southwest Texas State	2	–	3	–	0	3	–	8	–	0
Southeastern Louisiana	1	–	4	–	0	2	–	9	–	0
+ – Conference co-champions; This conference was a hybrid of NCAA Division II and Division I-AA Programs. Sam Houston State was classified as Division II. Stephen F. Austin was also classified as NCAA Division II. All the other teams were I-AA.

The 1985 Nicholls State Colonels football team represented Nicholls State University as a member of the Gulf Star Conference during the 1985 NCAA Division I-AA football season. Led by fifth-year head coach Sonny Jackson, the Colonels compiled an overall record of 6–5 with a mark of 2–3 in conference play, placing in a three-way tie for third in the Gulf State. Nicholls State played home games at John L. Guidry Stadium in Thibodaux, Louisiana.

== Schedule ==
Date	Opponent	Site	Result	Attendance	Source
September 14	No. 10 (D-II) Troy State*	John L. Guidry Stadium; Thibodaux, LA	W 40–22	8,115	
September 21	at McNeese State*	Cowboy Stadium; Lake Charles, LA	W 37–15	19,750	
September 28	at Northeast Louisiana*	Malone Stadium; Monroe, LA	L 15–17		
October 5	Bishop*	John L. Guidry Stadium; Thibodaux, LA	W 39–12		
October 12	at No. 19 Southern*	A. W. Mumford Stadium; Baton Rouge, LA	L 22–25		
October 19	Stephen F. Austin	John L. Guidry Stadium; Thibodaux, LA	L 10–20		
October 26	Southwest Texas State	John L. Guidry Stadium; Thibodaux, LA (rivalry)	W 20–12		
November 2	at Sam Houston State	Pritchett Field; Huntsville, TX	L 14–28	3,500	
November 9	Northwestern State	John L. Guidry Stadium; Thibodaux, LA (rivalry)	L 14–20		
November 16	Southwest Missouri State*	John L. Guidry Stadium; Thibodaux, LA	W 31–28		
November 29	at Southeastern Louisiana	Strawberry Stadium; Hammond, LA (rivalry)	W 21–17	7,500	
*Non-conference game; Rankings from NCAA Division I-AA Football Committee Poll released prior to the game
