= 1985 Louisiana Tech Bulldogs football team =

American college football season

1985 Louisiana Tech Bulldogs football
- Conference: Southland Conference
- Record: 8–3 (4–2 Southland)
- Head coach: A. L. Williams (3rd season)
- Captains: Doyle Adams; Ken Hetherington
- Home stadium: Joe Aillet Stadium

1985 Southland Conference football standings
| | Conf. | | | | | Overall |
| Team | W | | L | | T | W | | L | | T |
|---|---|---|---|---|---|---|---|---|---|---|
| No. 6 Arkansas State $^ | 5 | – | 1 | – | 0 | 9 | – | 4 | – | 0 |
| No. 14 Louisiana Tech | 4 | – | 2 | – | 0 | 8 | – | 3 | – | 0 |
| McNeese State | 3 | – | 1 | – | 2 | 6 | – | 3 | – | 2 |
| Northeast Louisiana | 3 | – | 3 | – | 0 | 6 | – | 5 | – | 0 |
| North Texas State | 2 | – | 3 | – | 1 | 4 | – | 6 | – | 1 |
| UT Arlington | 2 | – | 3 | – | 1 | 4 | – | 6 | – | 1 |
| Lamar | 0 | – | 6 | – | 0 | 2 | – | 9 | – | 0 |
$ – Conference champion; ^ – NCAA Division I-AA playoff participant; Rankings from NCAA Division I-AA Football Committee poll

The 1985 Louisiana Tech Bulldogs football team was an American football team that represented Louisiana Tech University as a member of the Southland Conference during the 1985 NCAA Division I-AA football season. In their third year under head coach A. L. Williams, the team compiled an 8–3 record.

== Schedule ==
| Date | Opponent | Rank | Site | Result | Attendance | Source |
|---|---|---|---|---|---|---|
| September 7 | at Southern Miss* | | M. M. Roberts Stadium; Hattiesburg, MS (Rivalry in Dixie) | L 0–28 | 23,432 | |
| September 14 | Southwestern Louisiana* | | Joe Aillet Stadium; Ruston, LA (rivalry) | W 24–23 | 17,000 | |
| September 21 | at West Texas State* | | Kimbrough Memorial Stadium; Canyon, TX | W 20–10 | 7,025 | |
| September 28 | Southeastern Louisiana^{†} | No. 20 | Joe Aillet Stadium; Ruston, LA | W 40–7 | 18,224 | |
| October 5 | at No. 20 North Texas State | No. T–12 | Fouts Field; Denton, TX | W 33–8 | 15,800 | |
| October 12 | McNeese State | No. T–12 | Joe Aillet Stadium; Ruston, LA | W 35–3 | 17,833 | |
| October 19 | at No. T–19 Arkansas State | No. T–8 | Indian Stadium; Jonesboro, AR | L 13–31 | 10,863 | |
| October 26 | vs. Northwestern State* | No. 18 | Independence Stadium; Shreveport, LA (rivalry) | W 33–17 | 14,783 | |
| November 2 | Lamar | No. 12 | Joe Aillet Stadium; Ruston, LA | W 23–22 | 3,200 | |
| November 9 | Northeast Louisiana | No. T–9 | Joe Aillet Stadium; Ruston, LA (rivalry) | L 9–13 | 21,800 | |
| November 16 | at UT Arlington | | Maverick Stadium; Arlington, TX | W 29–14 | 4,800 | |
*Non-conference game; ^{†}Homecoming; Rankings from NCAA Division I-AA Football Committee Poll released prior to the game
