= 1985 McNeese State Cowboys football team =

American college football season

1985 McNeese State Cowboys football
- Conference: Southland Conference
- Record: 6–3–2 (3–1–2 Southland)
- Head coach: John McCann (3rd season)
- Offensive coordinator: Steve Ensminger (2nd season)
- Home stadium: Cowboy Stadium

1985 Southland Conference football standings
	Conf.					Overall
Team	W		L		T	W		L		T
No. 6 Arkansas State $^	5	–	1	–	0	9	–	4	–	0
No. 14 Louisiana Tech	4	–	2	–	0	8	–	3	–	0
McNeese State	3	–	1	–	2	6	–	3	–	2
Northeast Louisiana	3	–	3	–	0	6	–	5	–	0
North Texas State	2	–	3	–	1	4	–	6	–	1
UT Arlington	2	–	3	–	1	4	–	6	–	1
Lamar	0	–	6	–	0	2	–	9	–	0
$ – Conference champion; ^ – NCAA Division I-AA playoff participant; Rankings from NCAA Division I-AA Football Committee poll

The 1985 McNeese State Cowboys football team was an American football team that represented McNeese State University as a member of the Southland Conference (Southland) during the 1985 NCAA Division I-AA football season. In their third year under head coach John McCann, the team compiled an overall record of 6–3–2, with a mark of 3–1–2 in conference play, and finished third in the Southland.

== Schedule ==
Date	Opponent	Site	Result	Attendance	Source
September 7	at Southeastern Louisiana*	Strawberry Stadium; Hammond, LA	W 14–7	7,500	
September 14	at Northwestern State*	Harry Turpin Stadium; Natchitoches, LA (rivalry)	L 13–14		
September 21	Nicholls State*	Cowboy Stadium; Lake Charles, LA	L 15–37	19,750	
September 28	No. 6 Arkansas State	Cowboy Stadium; Lake Charles, LA	W 15–13		
October 12	at No. T–12 Louisiana Tech	Joe Aillet Stadium; Ruston, LA	L 3–35	17,833	
October 19	Southwest Texas State*	Cowboy Stadium; Lake Charles, LA	W 28–0		
October 26	North Texas State	Cowboy Stadium; Lake Charles, LA	T 0–0		
November 2	at Northeast Louisiana	Malone Stadium; Monroe, LA	W 10–0		
November 9	UT Arlington	Cowboy Stadium; Lake Charles, LA	T 10–10	15,023	
November 16	at Southwestern Louisiana*	Cajun Field; Lafayette, LA (rivalry)	W 14–3		
November 23	at Lamar	Cardinal Stadium; Beaumont, TX (rivalry)	W 28–7		
*Non-conference game; Rankings from NCAA Division I-AA Football Committee Poll released prior to the game
