= 1984 Northwestern State Demons football team =

American college football season

1984 Northwestern State Demons football

Gulf Star co-champion
- Conference: Gulf Star Conference
- Record: 7–4 (4–1 GSC)
- Head coach: Sam Goodwin (2nd season)
- Defensive coordinator: John Thompson (2nd season)
- Home stadium: Harry Turpin Stadium

1984 Gulf Star Conference football standings
	Conf.					Overall
Team	W		L		T	W		L		T
Northwestern State +	4	–	1	–	0	7	–	4	–	0
Nicholls State +	4	–	1	–	0	6	–	5	–	0
Sam Houston State	3	–	2	–	0	8	–	3	–	0
Southwest Texas State	2	–	3	–	0	7	–	4	–	0
Stephen F. Austin	1	–	3	–	1	7	–	3	–	1
Southeastern Louisiana	0	–	4	–	1	2	–	8	–	1
$ – Conference champion; The conference was a hybrid of NCAA Division I-AA and Division II programs. Stephen F. Austin was classified NCAA Division II. Sam Houston State was classified as Division II. All the other teams were I-AA. All the other teams were Division I-AA.

The 1984 Northwestern State Demons football team was an American football team that represented Northwestern State University during the 1984 NCAA Division I-AA football season as a member of the Gulf Star Conference (GSC). Led by second-year head coach Sam Goodwin, the Demons compiled an 7–4 record, with a mark of 4–1 in conference play, and finished as GSC co-champion.

== Schedule ==
Date	Opponent	Site	Result	Attendance	Source
September 1	at McNeese State*	Cowboy Stadium; Lake Charles, LA (rivalry)	L 14–17		
September 8	at Angelo State*	San Angelo Stadium; San Angelo, TX	L 7–10		
September 22	Abilene Christian*	Harry Turpin Stadium; Natchitoches, LA	W 26–7		
September 29	at Northeast Louisiana*	Malone Stadium; Monroe, LA (rivalry)	W 27–10	18,553	
October 6	Southwest Texas State	Harry Turpin Stadium; Natchitoches, LA	W 28–7		
October 11	Nicholls State	Harry Turpin Stadium; Natchitoches, LA (rivalry)	W 19–0		
October 20	vs. No. T–17 Louisiana Tech*	Independence Stadium; Shreveport, LA (rivalry)	L 0–5	9,424	
October 27	Sam Houston State	Harry Turpin Stadium; Natchitoches, LA	W 38–7	6,300	
November 3	at Southern Miss*	M. M. Roberts Stadium; Hattiesburg, MS	W 22–0	24,682	
November 10	at Southeastern Louisiana	Strawberry Stadium; Hammond, LA (rivalry)	W 34–14	4,000	
November 17	at Stephen F. Austin	Lumberjack Stadium; Nacogdoches, TX (rivalry)	L 18–22		
*Non-conference game; Rankings from NCAA Division I-AA Football Committee Poll released prior to the game
