= 1985 Sam Houston State Bearkats football team =

American college football season

1985 Sam Houston State Bearkats football

Gulf Star co-champion
- Conference: Gulf Star Conference
- Record: 8–3 (4–1 GSC)
- Head coach: Ron Randleman (4th season)
- Home stadium: Pritchett Field

1985 Gulf Star Conference football standings
	Conf.					Overall
Team	W		L		T	W		L		T
Stephen F. Austin +	4	–	1	–	0	9	–	2	–	0
Sam Houston State +	4	–	1	–	0	8	–	3	–	0
Nicholls State	2	–	3	–	0	6	–	5	–	0
Northwestern State	2	–	3	–	0	3	–	8	–	0
Southwest Texas State	2	–	3	–	0	3	–	8	–	0
Southeastern Louisiana	1	–	4	–	0	2	–	9	–	0
+ – Conference co-champions; This conference was a hybrid of NCAA Division II and Division I-AA Programs. Sam Houston State was classified as Division II. Stephen F. Austin was also classified as NCAA Division II. All the other teams were I-AA.

The 1985 Sam Houston State Bearkats football team represented Sam Houston State University as a member of the Gulf Star Conference (GSC) during the 1985 NCAA Division II football season. Led by fourth-year head coach Ron Randleman, the Bearkats compiled an overall record of 8–3 with a mark of 4–1 in conference play, and finished as co-champion in the GSC.

== Schedule ==
Date	Opponent	Site	Result	Attendance	Source
September 7	Prairie View A&M*	Pritchett Field; Huntsville, TX	L 9–14	6,500	
September 14	UT Arlington*	Pritchett Field; Huntsville, TX	W 38–28	5,000	
September 28	at Angelo State*	San Angelo Stadium; San Angelo, TX	W 24–14	7,500	
October 5	East Texas State*	Pritchett Field; Huntsville, TX	L 21–40	5,500	
October 12	at Southeastern Louisiana	Strawberry Stadium; Hammond, LA	W 24–13	5,500	
October 19	Northwestern State	Pritchett Field; Huntsville, TX	L 10–14	2,000	
October 26	at Lamar*	Cardinal Stadium; Beaumont, TX	W 34–22	5,328	
November 2	Nicholls State	Pritchett Field; Huntsville, TX	W 28–14	3,500	
November 9	at Stephen F. Austin	Lumberjack Stadium; Nacogdoches, TX (rivalry)	W 28–21	12,500	
November 16	Washburn*	Pritchett Field; Huntsville, TX	W 51–7	1,000	
November 23	at Southwest Texas State	Bobcat Stadium; San Marcos, TX (rivalry)	W 27–25	5,021	
*Non-conference game
