= John Monroe (baseball) =

American baseball player (1897-1956)

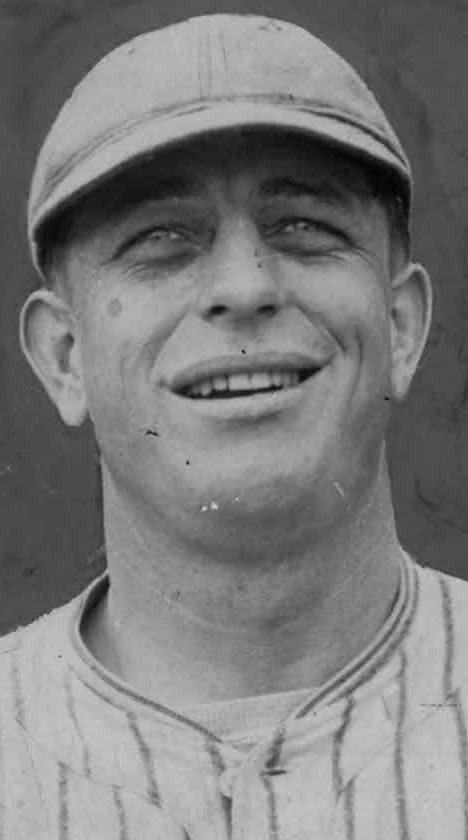
- Second baseman
- Born: August 24, 1897; Farmersville, Texas, U.S.
- Died: June 19, 1956 (aged 58); Conroe, Texas, U.S.
- Batted: Left Threw: Right

debut
- April 16, 1921, for the New York Giants

Last appearance
- October 1, 1921, for the Philadelphia Phillies

Career statistics
- Batting average: .266
- Home runs: 2
- Runs batted in: 11
- Stats at Baseball Reference

Teams
- New York Giants (1921); Philadelphia Phillies (1921)

John Allen Monroe (August 24, 1897 – June 19, 1956) was an American infielder in Major League Baseball for the New York Giants and Philadelphia Phillies in 1921. While Monroe would never return to the major leagues, he would enjoy a fourteen-year career (1920, 1922-34) in minor league baseball, of which he played eight seasons (1926-33) in the PCL.
