= 1984 Arkansas State Indians football team =

American college football season

1984 Arkansas State Indians football

NCAA Division I-AA Quarterfinal, L 14–31 vs. Montana State
- Conference: Southland Conference

Ranking
- FCS Coaches: No. 10
- Record: 8–4–1 (4–1–1 Southland)
- Head coach: Larry Lacewell (6th season)
- Home stadium: Indian Stadium

1984 Southland Conference football standings
	Conf.					Overall
Team	W		L		T	W		L		T
No. 9 Louisiana Tech $^	5	–	1	–	0	10	–	5	–	0
No. 10 Arkansas State ^	4	–	1	–	1	8	–	4	–	1
UT Arlington	4	–	2	–	0	7	–	4	–	0
Northeast Louisiana	3	–	3	–	0	7	–	4	–	0
No. 20 McNeese State	2	–	3	–	1	7	–	3	–	1
Lamar	1	–	5	–	0	2	–	9	–	0
North Texas State	1	–	5	–	0	2	–	9	–	0
$ – Conference champion; ^ – NCAA Division I-AA playoff participant; Rankings from NCAA Division I-AA Football Committee poll

The 1984 Arkansas State Indians football team represented Arkansas State University as a member of the Southland Conference during the 1984 NCAA Division I-AA football season. Led by sixth-year head coach Larry Lacewell, the Indians compiled an overall record of 8–4–1 with a mark of 4–1–1 in conference play, placing second in the Southland. Arkansas State advanced to the NCAA Division I-AA Football Championship playoffs, where they defeated Chattanooga in the first round and lost to Montana State in the quarterfinals.

== Schedule ==
Date	Opponent	Rank	Site	Result	Attendance	Source
September 1	at Memphis State*		Liberty Bowl Memorial Stadium; Memphis, TN (rivalry)	L 2–17	38,106	
September 8	at Chattanooga*		Chamberlain Field; Chattanooga, TN	W 16–0	8,882	
September 15	Tennessee–Martin*		Indian Stadium; Jonesboro, AR	W 72–14		
September 22	at Southern Illinois*	No. 17	McAndrew Stadium; Carbondale, IL	W 19–0	7,200	
September 29	at Texas A&M*	No. 9	Kyle Field; College Station, TX	L 21–22	45,282	
October 6	North Texas State	No. T–13	Indian Stadium; Jonesboro, AR	W 14–9	10,108	
October 13	at Louisiana Tech	No. 9	Joe Aillet Stadium; Ruston, LA	L 10–20	15,200	
October 20	No. 7 McNeese State		Indian Stadium; Jonesboro, AR	T 16–16		
October 27	at No. 17 UT Arlington	No. 20	Maverick Stadium; Arlington, TX	W 51–21	8,276	
November 10	Lamar^{†}	No. 14	Indian Stadium; Jonesboro, AR	W 37–13	10,127	
November 17	Northeast Louisiana	No. 12	Indian Stadium; Jonesboro, AR	W 38–14		
November 24	No. 17 Chattanooga*	No. 10	Indian Stadium; Jonesboro, AR (NCAA Division I-AA First Round)	W 37–10	10,872	
December 1	at No. 2 Montana State*	No. 10	Reno H. Sales Stadium; Bozeman, MT (NCAA Division I-AA Quarterfinal)	L 14–31	12,037	
*Non-conference game; ^{†}Homecoming; Rankings from NCAA Division I-AA Football Committee Poll released prior to the game
