= 1985 UCF Knights football team =

American college football season

1985 UCF Knights football
- Conference: Independent
- Record: 4–7
- Head coach: Gene McDowell (1st season)
- Offensive coordinator: Mike Kruczek (1st season)
- Defensive coordinator: Al Seagraves (3rd season)
- Home stadium: Florida Citrus Bowl

1985 NCAA Division II independents football records
	Conf.			Overall
Team	W	L	T	W		L		T
No. 14 American International		–		8	–	2	–	0
No. 10 Towson State		–		7	–	2	–	1
No. 5 Central State (OH) ^		–		8	–	3	–	0
Northern Michigan		–		6	–	3	–	0
New Haven		–		6	–	4	–	0
Southern Connecticut State		–		4	–	5	–	0
Liberty		–		3	–	4	–	1
UCF		–		4	–	7	–	0
Central Connecticut		–		3	–	7	–	0
Saint Mary's		–		3	–	8	–	0
Springfield		–		2	–	8	–	0
Kentucky State		–		0	–	11	–	0
^ – NCAA Division II playoff participant; Rankings from NCAA Division II Football Committee poll

The 1985 UCF Knights football season represented the University of Central Florida (UCF) and independent during the 1985 NCAA Division II football season. Led by first-year head coach Gene McDowell, the Knights compiled a record of 4–7. UCF played home games at the Florida Citrus Bowl in Downtown Orlando

== Schedule ==
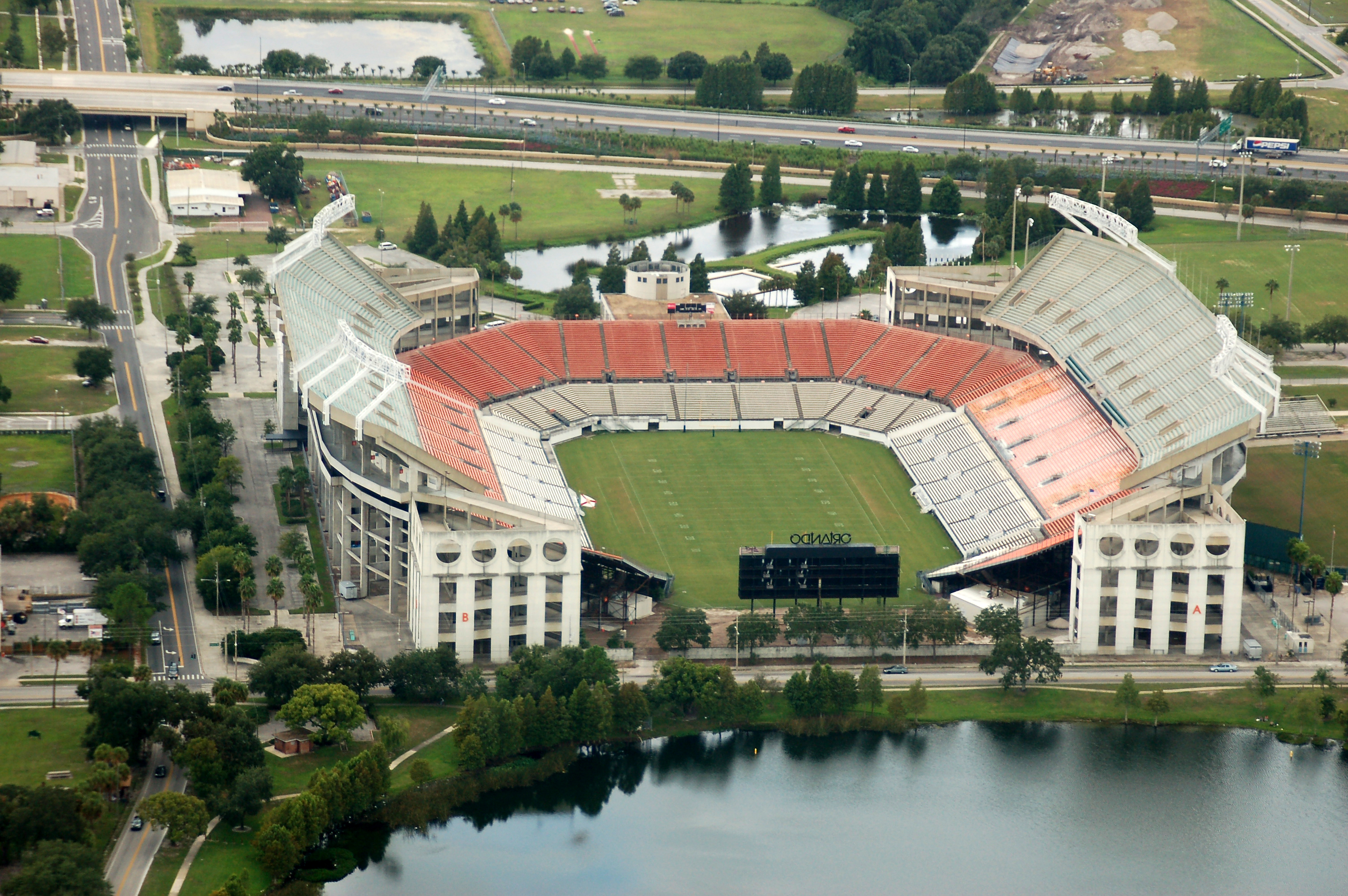
The Florida Citrus Bowl, the Knights' home field

Date	Opponent	Site	Result	Attendance	Source
September 7	Bethune–Cookman	Florida Citrus Bowl; Orlando, FL	W 39–37	21,222	
September 13	Southeastern Louisiana	Florida Citrus Bowl; Orlando, FL	W 27–21	7,142	
September 28	at Illinois State	Hancock Stadium; Normal, IL	L 21–48	12,786	
October 5	Southwest Texas State	Florida Citrus Bowl; Orlando, FL	L 12–48	7,850	
October 12	Western Kentucky	Florida Citrus Bowl; Orlando, FL	L 17–47	9,153	
October 19	Eastern Kentucky	Florida Citrus Bowl; Orlando, FL	L 21–28	8,223	
October 26	Stephen F. Austin	Florida Citrus Bowl; Orlando, FL	L 24–59	11,263	
November 2	at Louisville	Cardinal Stadium; Louisville, KY	L 21–42	21,391	
November 9	at No. 16 Georgia Southern	Paulson Stadium; Statesboro, GA	L 18–35	7,759	
November 23	Savannah State	Florida Citrus Bowl; Orlando, FL	W 31–7	3,478	
November 30	Samford	Florida Citrus Bowl; Orlando, FL	W 35–14	3,022	
Rankings from NCAA Division I-AA Football Committee Poll released prior to the game
