= 1985 North Texas State Mean Green football team =

American college football season

1985 North Texas State Mean Green football
- Conference: Southland Conference
- Record: 4–6–1 (2–3–1 Southland)
- Head coach: Corky Nelson (4th season)
- Offensive scheme: Veer/wishbone
- Home stadium: Fouts Field

1985 Southland Conference football standings
	Conf.					Overall
Team	W		L		T	W		L		T
No. 6 Arkansas State $^	5	–	1	–	0	9	–	4	–	0
No. 14 Louisiana Tech	4	–	2	–	0	8	–	3	–	0
McNeese State	3	–	1	–	2	6	–	3	–	2
Northeast Louisiana	3	–	3	–	0	6	–	5	–	0
North Texas State	2	–	3	–	1	4	–	6	–	1
UT Arlington	2	–	3	–	1	4	–	6	–	1
Lamar	0	–	6	–	0	2	–	9	–	0
$ – Conference champion; ^ – NCAA Division I-AA playoff participant; Rankings from NCAA Division I-AA Football Committee poll

The 1985 North Texas State Mean Green football team was an American football team that represented North Texas State University (now known as the University of North Texas) during the 1985 NCAA Division I-AA football season as a member of the Southland Conference. In their fourth year under head coach Corky Nelson, the team compiled a 4–6–1 record.

== Schedule ==
Date	Opponent	Rank	Site	Result	Attendance	Source
September 7	Northwestern State*		Fouts Field; Denton, TX	W 34–14	14,400	
September 14	at No. 8 (I-A) Oklahoma State*		Lewis Field; Stillwater, OK	L 9–10	49,100	
September 21	at Texas Tech*		Jones Stadium; Lubbock, TX	L 7–28	33,494	
September 28	at Kansas State*		KSU Stadium; Manhattan, KS	W 22–10	22,000	
October 5	No. T–12 Louisiana Tech^{†}	No. 20	Fouts Field; Denton, TX	L 8–33	15,800	
October 12	at Arkansas State		Indian Stadium; Jonesboro, AR	L 0–56	16,211	
October 19	at TCU*		Amon G. Carter Stadium; Fort Worth, TX	L 10–14	19,914	
October 26	at McNeese State		Cowboy Stadium; Lake Charles, LA	T 0–0		
November 9	Lamar		Fouts Field; Denton, TX	W 20–0		
November 16	at Northeast Louisiana		Malone Stadium; Monroe, LA	L 17–18	12,851	
November 23	UT Arlington		Fouts Field; Denton, TX	W 23–20	6,200	
*Non-conference game; ^{†}Homecoming; Rankings from NCAA Division I-AA Football Committee Poll released prior to the game
