= 1985 Arkansas State Indians football team =

American college football season

1985 Arkansas State Indians football

Southland champion

NCAA Division I-AA Quarterfinal, L 23–24 vs. Nevada
- Conference: Southland Conference
- Record: 9–4 (5–1 Southland)
- Head coach: Larry Lacewell (7th season)
- Home stadium: Indian Stadium

1985 Southland Conference football standings
	Conf.					Overall
Team	W		L		T	W		L		T
No. 6 Arkansas State $^	5	–	1	–	0	9	–	4	–	0
No. 14 Louisiana Tech	4	–	2	–	0	8	–	3	–	0
McNeese State	3	–	1	–	2	6	–	3	–	2
Northeast Louisiana	3	–	3	–	0	6	–	5	–	0
North Texas State	2	–	3	–	1	4	–	6	–	1
UT Arlington	2	–	3	–	1	4	–	6	–	1
Lamar	0	–	6	–	0	2	–	9	–	0
$ – Conference champion; ^ – NCAA Division I-AA playoff participant; Rankings from NCAA Division I-AA Football Committee poll

The 1985 Arkansas State Indians football team represented Arkansas State University as a member of the Southland Conference during the 1985 NCAA Division I-AA football season. Led by seventh-year head coach Larry Lacewell, the Indians compiled an overall record of 9–4 with a mark of 5–1 in conference play, winning the Southland title. Arkansas State advanced to the NCAA Division I-AA Football Championship playoffs, where they defeated Grambling State in the first round and lost to Nevada in the quarterfinals.

== Schedule ==
Date	Opponent	Rank	Site	Result	Attendance	Source
August 31	at Northwestern State*		Harry Turpin Stadium; Natchitoches, LA	W 12–10	10,113	
September 7	at Mississippi State*		Scott Field; Starkville, MS	L 14–22	28,122	
September 14	Mississippi College*		Indian Stadium; Jonesboro, AR	W 41–13		
September 21	at Ole Miss*		Vaught–Hemingway Stadium; Oxford, MS	L 16–18	29,912	
September 28	at McNeese State	No. 6	Cowboy Stadium; Lake Charles, LA	L 13–15		
October 12	North Texas State		Indian Stadium; Jonesboro, AR	W 56–0	16,211	
October 19	No. T–8 Louisiana Tech	No. T–19	Indian Stadium; Jonesboro, AR	W 31–13	10,863	
November 2	UT Arlington^{†}	No. 15	Indian Stadium; Jonesboro, AR	W 13–12	13,640	
November 9	Southern Illinois*	No. 8	Indian Stadium; Jonesboro, AR	W 41–12	10,104	
November 16	at Lamar	No. T–7	Cardinal Stadium; Beaumont, TX	W 21–0	2,832	
November 23	at Northeast Louisiana	No. 6	Malone Stadium; Monroe, LA	W 31–23		
November 30	No. 8 Grambling State*	No. 6	Indian Stadium; Jonesboro, AR (NCAA Division I-AA First Round)	W 10–7		
December 7	at No. T–2 Nevada*	No. 6	Mackay Stadium; Reno, NV (NCAA Division I-AA Quarterfinal)	L 23–24	10,241	
*Non-conference game; ^{†}Homecoming; Rankings from NCAA Division I-AA Football Committee Poll released prior to the game
