= 1984 UT Arlington Mavericks football team =

American college football season

1984 UT Arlington Mavericks football
- Conference: Southland Conference
- Record: 7–4 (4–2 Southland)
- Head coach: Chuck Curtis (1st season)
- Offensive scheme: Multiple
- Base defense: 4–0
- Home stadium: Maverick Stadium

1984 Southland Conference football standings
	Conf.					Overall
Team	W		L		T	W		L		T
No. 9 Louisiana Tech $^	5	–	1	–	0	10	–	5	–	0
No. 10 Arkansas State ^	4	–	1	–	1	8	–	4	–	1
UT Arlington	4	–	2	–	0	7	–	4	–	0
Northeast Louisiana	3	–	3	–	0	7	–	4	–	0
No. 20 McNeese State	2	–	3	–	1	7	–	3	–	1
Lamar	1	–	5	–	0	2	–	9	–	0
North Texas State	1	–	5	–	0	2	–	9	–	0
$ – Conference champion; ^ – NCAA Division I-AA playoff participant; Rankings from NCAA Division I-AA Football Committee poll

The 1984 UT Arlington Mavericks football team was an American football team that represented the University of Texas at Arlington in the Southland Conference during the 1984 NCAA Division I-AA football season. In their first year under head coach Chuck Curtis, the team compiled a 7–4 record.

== Schedule ==
Date	Opponent	Rank	Site	Result	Attendance	Source
September 8	West Texas State*		Maverick Stadium; Arlington, TX	W 27–19	9,367	
September 15	at Texas Tech*		Jones Stadium; Lubbock, TX	L 7–44	35,121	
September 22	No. 18 Southwest Texas State*		Maverick Stadium; Arlington, TX	W 48–13	9,048	
September 29	at Lamar		Cardinal Stadium; Beaumont, TX	W 13–10		
October 6	Stephen F. Austin*		Maverick Stadium; Arlington, TX	L 13–27		
October 13	at Wichita State*		Cessna Stadium; Wichita, KS	W 17–15	15,234	
October 20	at Northeast Louisiana		Malone Stadium; Monroe, LA	W 9–7	5,111	
October 27	No. 20 Arkansas State	No. 17	Maverick Stadium; Arlington, TX	L 21–51	8,276	
November 3	McNeese State		Maverick Stadium; Arlington, TX	W 24–20	4,611	
November 10	at No. 20т Louisiana Tech		Joe Aillet Stadium; Ruston, LA	L 0–34	14,200	
November 17	North Texas State		Maverick Stadium; Arlington, TX	W 22–0	2,500	
*Non-conference game; Rankings from NCAA Division I-AA Football Committee Poll released prior to the game
