= 1985 UT Arlington Mavericks football team =

American college football season

1985 UT Arlington Mavericks football
- Conference: Southland Conference
- Record: 4–6–1 (2–3–1 Southland)
- Head coach: Chuck Curtis (2nd season)
- Offensive scheme: Multiple
- Base defense: 4–0
- Home stadium: Maverick Stadium

1985 Southland Conference football standings
	Conf.					Overall
Team	W		L		T	W		L		T
No. 6 Arkansas State $^	5	–	1	–	0	9	–	4	–	0
No. 14 Louisiana Tech	4	–	2	–	0	8	–	3	–	0
McNeese State	3	–	1	–	2	6	–	3	–	2
Northeast Louisiana	3	–	3	–	0	6	–	5	–	0
North Texas State	2	–	3	–	1	4	–	6	–	1
UT Arlington	2	–	3	–	1	4	–	6	–	1
Lamar	0	–	6	–	0	2	–	9	–	0
$ – Conference champion; ^ – NCAA Division I-AA playoff participant; Rankings from NCAA Division I-AA Football Committee poll

The 1985 UT Arlington Mavericks football team was an American football team that represented the University of Texas at Arlington in the Southland Conference during the 1985 NCAA Division I-AA football season. In their second year under head coach Chuck Curtis, the team compiled a 4–6–1 record. At the conclusion of the season on November 25, UTA President Wendell Nedderman announced the football program was to be discontinued citing financial concerns.

== Schedule ==
Date	Opponent	Site	Result	Attendance	Source
September 7	Angelo State*	Maverick Stadium; Arlington, TX	L 23–35	7,205	
September 14	at Sam Houston State*	Pritchett Field; Huntsville, TX	L 28–38		
September 28	at Southwest Texas State*	Bobcat Stadium; San Marcos, TX	W 19–16		
October 5	Wichita State*	Maverick Stadium; Arlington, TX	W 31–3	4,850	
October 12	at Drake*	Drake Stadium; Des Moines, IA	L 10–21	7,925	
October 19	Lamar	Maverick Stadium; Arlington, TX	W 37–17	5,775	
October 26	Northeast Louisiana	Maverick Stadium; Arlington, TX	W 27–13	5,370	
November 2	at No. 15 Arkansas State	Indian Stadium; Jonesboro, AR	L 12–13	13,640	
November 9	at McNeese State	Cowboy Stadium; Lake Charles, LA	T 10–10	15,023	
November 16	Louisiana Tech	Maverick Stadium; Arlington, TX	L 14–29	4,800	
November 23	at North Texas State	Fouts Field; Denton, TX	L 20–23	6,200	
*Non-conference game; Rankings from NCAA Division I-AA Football Committee Poll released prior to the game

== Game summaries ==
=== Angelo State ===
	1	2	3	4	Total
Rams	0	21	7	7	35
Mavericks	10	0	6	7	23

Statistics	ASU	UTA
First downs	16	11
Total yards	342	187
Rushing yards	147	78
Passing yards	195	109
Turnovers	3	6
Time of possession	31:02	28:58

Team	Category	Player	Statistics
Angelo State	Passing	Ned Cox	17/34, 195 yards, INT
Angelo State	Rushing	Wesley Williams	17 rushes, 136 yards, 3 TD
Angelo State	Receiving	Wesley Williams	5 receptions, 28 yards
UT Arlington	Passing	David Bates	9/22, 77 yards, TD, 3 INT
UT Arlington	Rushing	Jarvis McKyer	14 rushes, 47 yards, TD
UT Arlington	Receiving	Keith Arbon	4 receptions, 57 yards

=== At Drake ===
	1	2	3	4	Total
Mavericks	3	0	7	0	10
Bulldogs	7	0	0	14	21

=== Lamar ===
	1	2	3	4	Total
Cardinals	0	0	7	10	17
Mavericks	10	17	3	7	37

=== At No. 15 Arkansas State ===
	1	2	3	4	Total
Mavericks	0	9	3	0	12
No. 15 Indians	0	0	7	6	13

=== At McNeese State ===
	1	2	3	4	Total
Mavericks	7	3	0	0	10
Cowboys	0	3	7	0	10

=== Louisiana Tech ===
	1	2	3	4	Total
Bulldogs	0	12	14	3	29
Mavericks	7	0	7	0	14

=== At North Texas State ===
	1	2	3	4	Total
Mavericks	3	7	3	7	20
Mean Green	7	6	0	10	23

Statistics	UTA	NTSU
First downs	28	14
Total yards	448	356
Rushing yards	104	182
Passing yards	344	174
Turnovers	3	2
Time of possession	35:30	24:30

Team	Category	Player	Statistics
UT Arlington	Passing	David Bates	27/39, 344 yards, TD, INT
UT Arlington	Rushing	Tony Brown	25 rushes, 130 yards, TD
UT Arlington	Receiving	Keith Arbon	8 receptions, 154 yards
North Texas State	Passing	Bron Beal	7/10, 174 yards, TD, INT
North Texas State	Rushing	Billy Brewer	19 rushes, 95 yards, TD
North Texas State	Receiving	Dirk Davis	3 receptions, 50 yards
