= 1984 Lamar Cardinals football team =

American college football season

1984 Lamar Cardinals football
- Conference: Southland Conference
- Record: 2–9 (1–5 Southland)
- Head coach: Ken Stephens (3rd season)
- Home stadium: Cardinal Stadium

1984 Southland Conference football standings
	Conf.					Overall
Team	W		L		T	W		L		T
No. 9 Louisiana Tech $^	5	–	1	–	0	10	–	5	–	0
No. 10 Arkansas State ^	4	–	1	–	1	8	–	4	–	1
UT Arlington	4	–	2	–	0	7	–	4	–	0
Northeast Louisiana	3	–	3	–	0	7	–	4	–	0
No. 20 McNeese State	2	–	3	–	1	7	–	3	–	1
Lamar	1	–	5	–	0	2	–	9	–	0
North Texas State	1	–	5	–	0	2	–	9	–	0
$ – Conference champion; ^ – NCAA Division I-AA playoff participant; Rankings from NCAA Division I-AA Football Committee poll

The 1984 Lamar Cardinals football team represented Lamar University in the 1984 NCAA Division I-AA football season as a member of the Southland Conference. The Cardinals played their home games at Cardinal Stadium now named Provost Umphrey Stadium in Beaumont, Texas. Lamar finished the 1984 season with a 2–9 overall record and a 1–5 conference record.

== Schedule ==
Date	Opponent	Site	Result	Attendance	Source
September 1	Texas Southern*	Cardinal Stadium; Beaumont, TX	L 7–13		
September 15	North Texas State	Cardinal Stadium; Beaumont, TX	W 10–6	9,201	
September 22	at Rice*	Rice Stadium; Houston, TX	L 19–36		
September 29	at UT Arlington	Cardinal Stadium; Beaumont, TX	L 10–13	8,000	
October 6	Northeast Louisiana*	Malone Stadium; Monroe, LA	L 14–34		
October 13	Southwest Texas State*	Cardinal Stadium; Beaumont, TX	L 0–23		
October 20	at Sam Houston State*	Bowers Stadium; Huntsville, TX	L 11–27	8,000	
October 27	No. 14 Louisiana Tech	Cardinal Stadium; Beaumont, TX	L 7–22	4,114	
November 3	Nicholls State*	Cardinal Stadium; Beaumont, TX	W 20–16		
November 10	at No. 14 Arkansas State	Indian Stadium; Jonesboro, AR	L 13–37	10,127	
November 17	at McNeese State	Cowboy Stadium; Lake Charles, LA (rivalry)	L 14–34		
*Non-conference game; Rankings from NCAA Division I-AA Football Committee Poll released prior to the game
