= 1984 Nicholls State Colonels football team =

American college football season

1984 Nicholls State Colonels football

Gulf Star champion
- Conference: Gulf Star Conference
- Record: 6–5 (4–1 Gulf Star)
- Head coach: Sonny Jackson (4th season)
- Home stadium: John L. Guidry Stadium

1984 Gulf Star Conference football standings
	Conf.					Overall
Team	W		L		T	W		L		T
Northwestern State +	4	–	1	–	0	7	–	4	–	0
Nicholls State +	4	–	1	–	0	6	–	5	–	0
Sam Houston State	3	–	2	–	0	8	–	3	–	0
Southwest Texas State	2	–	3	–	0	7	–	4	–	0
Stephen F. Austin	1	–	3	–	1	7	–	3	–	1
Southeastern Louisiana	0	–	4	–	1	2	–	8	–	1
$ – Conference champion; The conference was a hybrid of NCAA Division I-AA and Division II programs. Stephen F. Austin was classified NCAA Division II. Sam Houston State was classified as Division II. All the other teams were I-AA. All the other teams were Division I-AA.

The 1984 Nicholls State Colonels football team represented Nicholls State University as a member of the Gulf Star Conference during the 1984 NCAA Division I-AA football season. Led by fourth-year head coach Sonny Jackson, the Colonels compiled an overall record of 6–5 with a mark of 4–1 in conference play, sharing the Gulf State title with Northwestern State. Nicholls State played home games at John L. Guidry Stadium in Thibodaux, Louisiana.

== Schedule ==
Date	Opponent	Site	Result	Attendance	Source
September 1	Northeast Louisiana*	John L. Guidry Stadium; Thibodaux, LA	L 6–13		
September 8	at Troy State*	Veterans Memorial Stadium; Troy, AL	L 7–26	7,200	
September 15	McNeese State*	John L. Guidry Stadium; Thibodaux, AL	L 21–24		
September 22	Austin Peay*	John L. Guidry Stadium; Thibodaux, LA	W 31–6		
September 27	Sam Houston State	John L. Guidry Stadium; Thibodaux, LA	W 24–6	9,040	
October 6	Southern*	John L. Guidry Stadium; Thibodaux, LA	W 43–26		
October 11	at Northwestern State	Harry Turpin Stadium; Natchitoches, LA (rivalry)	L 0–19		
October 20	at Stephen F. Austin	Lumberjack Stadium; Nacogdoches, TX	W 25–21		
November 3	at Lamar*	Cardinal Stadium; Beaumont, TX	L 16–20		
November 10	at Southwest Texas State	Bobcat Stadium; San Marcos, TX (rivalry)	W 30–14		
November 17	Southeastern Louisiana	John L. Guidry Stadium; Thibodaux, LA (rivalry)	W 36–7	10,015	
*Non-conference game
