= 1984 McNeese State Cowboys football team =

American college football season

1984 McNeese State Cowboys football
- Conference: Southland Conference
- Record: 7–3–1 (2–3–1 Southland)
- Head coach: John McCann (2nd season)
- Offensive coordinator: Steve Ensminger (1st season)
- Home stadium: Cowboy Stadium

1984 Southland Conference football standings
	Conf.					Overall
Team	W		L		T	W		L		T
No. 9 Louisiana Tech $^	5	–	1	–	0	10	–	5	–	0
No. 10 Arkansas State ^	4	–	1	–	1	8	–	4	–	1
UT Arlington	4	–	2	–	0	7	–	4	–	0
Northeast Louisiana	3	–	3	–	0	7	–	4	–	0
No. 20 McNeese State	2	–	3	–	1	7	–	3	–	1
Lamar	1	–	5	–	0	2	–	9	–	0
North Texas State	1	–	5	–	0	2	–	9	–	0
$ – Conference champion; ^ – NCAA Division I-AA playoff participant; Rankings from NCAA Division I-AA Football Committee poll

The 1984 McNeese State Cowboys football team was an American football team that represented McNeese State University as a member of the Southland Conference (Southland) during the 1984 NCAA Division I-AA football season. In their second year under head coach John McCann, the team compiled an overall record of 7–3–1, with a mark of 2–3–1 in conference play, and finished fifth in the Southland.

== Schedule ==
Date	Opponent	Rank	Site	Result	Attendance	Source
September 1	Northwestern State*		Cowboy Stadium; Lake Charles, LA (rivalry)	W 17–14		
September 8	Southeastern Louisiana*		Cowboy Stadium; Lake Charles, LA	W 28–7		
September 15	at Nicholls State*		John L. Guidry Stadium; Thibodaux, LA	W 24–21		
September 22	at West Texas State*	No. 2	Kimbrough Memorial Stadium; Canyon, TX	W 24–7		
October 6	Louisiana Tech	No. 2	Cowboy Stadium; Lake Charles, LA	L 17–24	20,000	
October 13	at North Texas State	No. 10	Fouts Field; Denton, TX	W 26–7		
October 20	at Arkansas State	No. 7	Indian Stadium; Jonesboro, AR	T 16–16		
October 27	Northeast Louisiana	No. 9	Cowboy Stadium; Lake Charles, LA	L 3–19		
November 3	at UT Arlington		Maverick Stadium; Arlington, TX	L 20–24	4,611	
November 10	Southwestern Louisiana*		Cowboy Stadium; Lake Charles, LA (rivalry)	W 30–17	23,000	
November 17	Lamar		Cowboy Stadium; Lake Charles, LA (rivalry)	W 34–14		
*Non-conference game; Rankings from NCAA Division I-AA Football Committee Poll released prior to the game
