= Farmersville Independent School District =

School district in Texas, United States

Location
- 501A State Highway 78N, Farmersville, Texas 75442 United States of America

District information
- Type: Public, Independent school district
- Superintendent: Micheal French
- Governing agency: Texas Education Agency
- NCES District ID: 4819080

Students and staff
- Students: 1,542
- Teachers: 107.6
- Staff: 189.7

Other information
- Website: www.farmersvilleisd.net

Farmersville Independent School District is a public school district based in Farmersville, Texas (USA).

In 2009, the school district was rated "academically acceptable" by the Texas Education Agency.

== Schools ==
- Farmersville High School (Grades 9-12)
- Farmersville Junior High School (Grades 6-8)
- Farmersville Intermediate School (Grades 2-5)
- Tatum Elementary School (Grades PK-1)

== Students ==
=== Academics ===
STAAR - Percent at Level II Satisfactory Standard or Above (Sum of All Grades Tested)
Subject	Farmersville ISD	Region 10	State of Texas
Reading	81%	74%	73%
Mathematics	84%	77%	76%
Writing	75%	71%	69%
Science	86%	80%	79%
Soc. Studies	89%	80%	77%
All Tests	83%	76%	75%

Students in Farmersville typically outperform local region and state-wide averages on standardized tests. In 2015-2016 State of Texas Assessments of Academic Readiness (STAAR) results, 83% of students in Farmersville ISD met Level II Satisfactory standards, compared with 76% in Region 10 and 75% in the state of Texas. The average SAT score of the class of 2015 was 1390, and the average ACT score was 20.9.

=== Demographics ===
In the 2015-2016 school year, the school district had a total of 1,559 students, ranging from pre-kindergarten through grade 12. The class of 2015 included 111 graduates; the annual drop-out rate across grades 9-12 was less than 0.5%.

As of the 2015-2016 school year, the ethnic distribution of the school district was 60.1% White, 33.4% Hispanic, 3.2% African American, 0.7% American Indian, 0.5% Asian, 0.0% Pacific Islander, and 2.1% from two or more races. Economically disadvantaged students made up 52.9% of the student body.
