= 1985 Stephen F. Austin Lumberjacks football team =

American college football season

1985 Stephen F. Austin Lumberjacks football

Gulf Star co-champion
- Conference: Gulf Star Conference
- Record: 9–2 (4–1 GSC)
- Head coach: Jim Hess (4th season)
- Home stadium: Lumberjack Stadium

1985 Gulf Star Conference football standings
	Conf.					Overall
Team	W		L		T	W		L		T
Stephen F. Austin +	4	–	1	–	0	9	–	2	–	0
Sam Houston State +	4	–	1	–	0	8	–	3	–	0
Nicholls State	2	–	3	–	0	6	–	5	–	0
Northwestern State	2	–	3	–	0	3	–	8	–	0
Southwest Texas State	2	–	3	–	0	3	–	8	–	0
Southeastern Louisiana	1	–	4	–	0	2	–	9	–	0
+ – Conference co-champions; This conference was a hybrid of NCAA Division II and Division I-AA Programs. Sam Houston State was classified as Division II. Stephen F. Austin was also classified as NCAA Division II. All the other teams were I-AA.

The 1985 Stephen F. Austin Lumberjacks football team was an American football team that represented Stephen F. Austin State University during the 1985 NCAA Division II football season as a member of the Gulf Star Conference (GSC). Led by fourth-year head coach Jim Hess, the Lumberjacks compiled an 9–2 record, with a mark of 4–1 in conference play, and finished as GSC co-champion.

== Schedule ==
Date	Opponent	Site	Result	Attendance	Source
September 5	at Delta State*	McCool Stadium; Cleveland, MS	W 29–12	4,100	
September 14	Texas Southern*	Lumberjack Stadium; Nacogdoches, TX	W 55–12		
September 21	at Texas A&I*	Javelina Stadium; Kingsville, TX	W 28–21		
September 28	Alcorn State*	Lumberjack Stadium; Nacogdoches, TX	W 42–12		
October 5	Abilene Christian*	Lumberjack Stadium; Nacogdoches, TX	L 21–22	15,300	
October 19	at Nicholls State	John L. Guidry Stadium; Thibodaux, LA	W 20–10		
October 26	at UCF*	Florida Citrus Bowl; Orlando, FL	W 59–24	11,263	
November 2	Southeastern Louisiana	Lumberjack Stadium; Nacogdoches, TX	W 27–12	3,000	
November 9	Sam Houston State	Lumberjack Stadium; Nacogdoches, TX (rivalry)	L 21–28	12,500	
November 16	Southwest Texas State	Lumberjack Stadium; Nacogdoches, TX	W 43–21	1,000	
November 23	at Northwestern State	Harry Turpin Stadium; Natchitoches, LA	W 19–10		
*Non-conference game
