= Corky Nelson =

American football player and coach

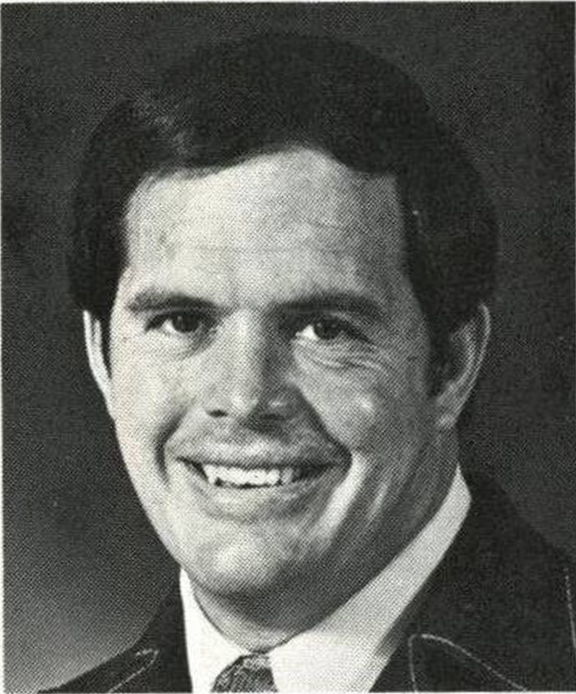
- Nelson, c. 1976

Biographical details
- Born: February 25, 1939; San Antonio, Texas, U.S.
- Died: November 17, 2014 (aged 75); Temple, Texas, U.S.

Playing career
- 1961–1963: Texas State
- Position(s): Center, linebacker

Coaching career (HC unless noted)
- 1967–1969: Harlandale HS (TX)
- 1970: North Texas State (DL/LB)
- 1971–1973: John Tyler HS (TX)
- 1974–1981: Baylor (DC)
- 1982–1990: North Texas State / North Texas
- 1991–1996: Seguin HS (TX)
- 1997–1998: Klein Forest HS (TX) (assistant)
- 1999–2003: Mary Hardin–Baylor (assistant)

Administrative career (AD unless noted)
- 1989–1990: North Texas

Head coaching record
- Overall: 48–52–1 (college)
- Tournaments: 0–3 (NCAA D-I-AA playoffs)

Accomplishments and honors

Championships
- 1 Southland (1983)

Corky Nelson (February 25, 1939 – November 17, 2014) was an American football player and coach. He is known for his coaching stint at the University of North Texas, but was more successful on the high school level.

Nelson was an all-conference center and linebacker at Texas State University–San Marcos, where he was captain of the 1963 team that went undefeated. He began coaching at the high school level soon after his graduation, first at Alamo Heights High School as an assistant, then at Harlandale High School as head coach. He briefly got into the collegiate ranks as defensive line and linebacker coach at the University of North Texas, but left after one season.

In 1971, Nelson became head coach at John Tyler High School in Tyler, Texas. In 1973, he guided a Lions team that featured Earl Campbell to a perfect 15–0 season as well as the state championship in the largest classification. Nelson then became defensive coordinator under coach Grant Teaff at Baylor University. In 1982, he was named head coach at North Texas, succeeding Bob Tyler. He was also named the school's athletic director in 1989. Following the 1990 season, his contract was not renewed.

Nelson died on November 17, 2014.

== Head coaching record ==
=== College ===
Year	Team	Overall	Conference	Standing	Bowl/playoffs
North Texas State / North Texas Eagles (Southland Conference) (1982–1990)
1982	North Texas State	2–9	0–0	NA	
1983	North Texas State	8–4	5–1	T–1st	L NCAA Division I-AA Quarterfinal
1984	North Texas State	2–9	1–5	T–6th	
1985	North Texas State	4–6–1	2–3–1	T–5th	
1986	North Texas State	6–4	3–2	T–2nd	
1987	North Texas State	7–5	5–1	T–2nd	L NCAA Division I-AA First Round
1988	North Texas	8–4	4–2	3rd	L NCAA Division I-AA First Round
1989	North Texas	5–6	2–4	T–5th	
1990	North Texas	6–5	2–4	6th	
North Texas State / North Texas:		48–52–1	24–20–1		
Total:		48–52–1			
