= 1985 Lamar Cardinals football team =

American college football season

1985 Lamar Cardinals football
- Conference: Southland Conference
- Record: 3–8 (0–6 Southland)
- Head coach: Ken Stephens (4th season)
- Home stadium: Cardinal Stadium

1985 Southland Conference football standings
	Conf.					Overall
Team	W		L		T	W		L		T
No. 6 Arkansas State $^	5	–	1	–	0	9	–	4	–	0
No. 14 Louisiana Tech	4	–	2	–	0	8	–	3	–	0
McNeese State	3	–	1	–	2	6	–	3	–	2
Northeast Louisiana	3	–	3	–	0	6	–	5	–	0
North Texas State	2	–	3	–	1	4	–	6	–	1
UT Arlington	2	–	3	–	1	4	–	6	–	1
Lamar	0	–	6	–	0	2	–	9	–	0
$ – Conference champion; ^ – NCAA Division I-AA playoff participant; Rankings from NCAA Division I-AA Football Committee poll

The 1985 Lamar Cardinals football team represented Lamar University in the 1985 NCAA Division I-AA football season as a member of the Southland Conference. The Cardinals played their home games at Cardinal Stadium now named Provost Umphrey Stadium in Beaumont, Texas. Lamar finished the 1985 season with a 3–8 overall record and a 0–6 conference record. The season marked the final year with Ken Stephens as Lamar Cardinals head football coach.

== Schedule ==
Date	Opponent	Site	Result	Attendance	Source
September 7	Texas Southern*	Cardinal Stadium; Beaumont, TX	W 32–20		
September 14	Prairie View A&M*	Cardinal Stadium; Beaumont, TX	W 30–7		
September 21	Southwest Texas State*	Cardinal Stadium; Beaumont, TX	W 24–21		
September 28	at Rice*	Rice Stadium; Houston, TX	L 28–29	9,038	
October 12	Northeast Louisiana	Cardinal Stadium; Beaumont, TX	L 14–37		
October 19	at UT Arlington	Maverick Stadium; Arlington, TX	L 17–37	5,775	
October 26	Sam Houston State*	Cardinal Stadium; Beaumont, TX	L 22–34	5,328	
November 2	at No. 12 Louisiana Tech	Joe Aillet Stadium; Ruston, LA	L 22–23	3,200	
November 9	at North Texas State	Fouts Field; Denton, TX	L 0–20		
November 16	No. T–7 Arkansas State	Cardinal Stadium; Beaumont, TX	L 0–21	2,832	
November 23	McNeese State	Cardinal Stadium; Beaumont, TX (rivalry)	L 7–28		
*Non-conference game; Rankings from NCAA Division I-AA Football Committee Poll released prior to the game
