= 1984 North Texas State Mean Green football team =

American college football season

1984 North Texas State Mean Green football
- Conference: Southland Conference
- Record: 2–9 (1–5 Southland)
- Head coach: Corky Nelson (3rd season)
- Home stadium: Fouts Field

1984 Southland Conference football standings
	Conf.					Overall
Team	W		L		T	W		L		T
No. 9 Louisiana Tech $^	5	–	1	–	0	10	–	5	–	0
No. 10 Arkansas State ^	4	–	1	–	1	8	–	4	–	1
UT Arlington	4	–	2	–	0	7	–	4	–	0
Northeast Louisiana	3	–	3	–	0	7	–	4	–	0
No. 20 McNeese State	2	–	3	–	1	7	–	3	–	1
Lamar	1	–	5	–	0	2	–	9	–	0
North Texas State	1	–	5	–	0	2	–	9	–	0
$ – Conference champion; ^ – NCAA Division I-AA playoff participant; Rankings from NCAA Division I-AA Football Committee poll

The 1984 North Texas State Mean Green football team was an American football team that represented North Texas State University (now known as the University of North Texas) during the 1984 NCAA Division I-AA football season as a member of the Southland Conference. In their third year under head coach Corky Nelson, the team compiled a 2–9 record.

== Schedule ==
Date	Opponent	Site	Result	Attendance	Source
September 1	Angelo State*	Fouts Field; Denton, TX	W 7–3	15,700	
September 15	at Lamar	Cardinal Stadium; Beaumont, TX	L 6–10	9,201	
September 22	at No. 13 (I-A) SMU*	Texas Stadium; Irving, TX (rivalry)	L 6–24	27,124	
September 29	at Louisiana Tech	Joe Aillet Stadium; Ruston, LA	L 12–17	15,400	
October 6	at Arkansas State	Indian Stadium; Jonesboro, AR	L 9–14	10,108	
October 13	McNeese State	Fouts Field; Denton, TX	L 7–26		
October 20	at TCU*	Amon G. Carter Stadium; Fort Worth, TX	L 3–34	18,795	
October 27	Southwest Texas State	Fouts Field; Denton, TX	L 19–27		
November 3	at Kentucky*	Commonwealth Stadium; Lexington, KY	L 7–31	54,328	
November 10	Northeast Louisiana^{†}	Fouts Field; Denton, TX	W 10–3	11,900	
November 17	at UT Arlington	Maverick Stadium; Arlington, TX	L 0–22	2,500	
*Non-conference game; ^{†}Homecoming; Rankings from NCAA Division I-AA Football Committee Poll released prior to the game
