= Brian Wickstrom =

American athletic director

Biographical details
- Born: July 2, 1969 (age 57); Omaha, Nebraska, U.S.
- Education: Kansas State University, Ohio University, Eastern Michigan University

Playing career
- 1987–1991: Kansas State
- Position: Track and field

Administrative career (AD unless noted)
- 1999–2001: Missouri (assistant AD)
- 2001–2003: Santa Clara (associate AD)
- 2004–2006: Michigan (assistant AD)
- 2006–2011: UTEP (Associate AD)
- 2011–2013: UC Riverside
- 2013–2017: Louisiana–Monroe
- 2017–2019: Incarnate Word

Brian Wickstrom (born July 2, 1969) is an American college athletics administrator. Wickstrom served as athletic director at the University of California, Riverside from 2011 to 2013, the University of Louisiana at Monroe from 2013 to 2017, and the University of the Incarnate Word from 2017 to 2019. Wickstrom graduated with his bachelor's and master's degrees in Business Administration from Kansas State University where he was a track and field athlete. He earned a Master of Sports Administration from Ohio University in 1999 and a Doctor of Education/Educational Leadership from Eastern Michigan University in 2006. On August 16, 2017, Wickstrom was named the new athletic director for the University of the Incarnate Word. Wickstrom left Incarnate Word on August 12, 2019.
