= Farmersville, Texas =

- City
- Farmersville Commercial District
- Motto: "Discover a Texas Treasure"
- Location of Farmersville in Collin County, Texas
- Coordinates: 33°9′51″N 96°22′0″W
- Country: United States
- State: Texas
- County: Collin
- Established: 1849

Government
  - Mayor: Craig Overstreet

Area
  - Total: 4.27 sq mi (11.07 km^{2})
  - Land: 4.10 sq mi (10.63 km^{2})
  - Water: 0.17 sq mi (0.43 km^{2})
- Elevation: 653 ft (199 m)

Population (2020)
  - Total: 3,612
  - Estimate (2025): 5,531
  - Density: 884.2/sq mi (341.39/km^{2})
- Time zone: UTC-6 (Central (CST))
  - Summer (DST): UTC-5 (CDT)
- ZIP code: 75442
- Area codes: 214, 469, 945, 972
- FIPS code: 48-25488
- GNIS feature ID: 1335715
- Website: www.farmersvilletx.com

Farmersville is a city located in Collin County, Texas, United States. The population was 3,612 at the 2020 census, with the larger Census County Division (CCD) having a population of 12,344.

== History ==
Historical population
Census	Pop.	Note	%±
1870	114		—
1880	230		101.8%
1890	1,093		375.2%
1900	1,856		69.8%
1910	1,848		−0.4%
1920	2,167		17.3%
1930	1,878		−13.3%
1940	2,206		17.5%
1950	1,955		−11.4%
1960	2,021		3.4%
1970	2,311		14.3%
1980	2,360		2.1%
1990	2,640		11.9%
2000	3,118		18.1%
2010	3,301		5.9%
2020	3,612		9.4%
2025 (est.)	5,531		53.1%
U.S. Decennial Census

Farmersville originated in 1849 as a settlement on the Jefferson-McKinney Road, and near Republic of Texas National Road - now known as US Highway 380 and Texas State Highway 78, respectively. The settlement was named by two of the original settlers - William Pickney Chapman & John Hendrex - after the chief occupation of many of the residents.

After 1854, additional settling families including the Yearys and several families of Sugar Hill (approximately 2 miles northeast) began relocating to Farmersville.

H.M. Markham, practicing here by 1855, is said to have been Collin County's earliest physician. The First United Methodist Church was organized in 1856. On March 4, 1859, William Gotcher donated land for the public town square, now the anchor of Farmersville’s commercial district.

Records indicate a school operated in town as early as the 1860s.

The First Baptist Church of Farmersville was organized on May 14, 1865.

The town was incorporated on June 2, 1873, with John S. Rike elected as the first mayor, with a City Council composed of aldermen James Church, Ben King, John Murchison, Tom Tatum, and John P. Utt. Jeff Hines served as the first town Marshal.

Institutions from the 1880s that are still in operation include the Farmersville Times, the oldest newspaper in Collin County, and the First Bank (now Independent Financial), as well as the two churches mentioned above.

On June 15, 1945, Audie Murphy, the most decorated combat soldier of World War II, came home to a hero's welcome in Farmersville. Thousands of celebrants filled the square to listen to him speak, and the event was noted in the July 16, 1945 edition of Life Magazine. A Texas Historical Commission plaque notes the event on The Square.

As the town became a trade center, agriculture kept pace. Farmersville in the 1930s was known as the "Onion Capital of North Texas", annually shipping over 1,000 carloads of onion. Along with some small industry, cantaloupe, cattle, corn, cotton, and maize crops remained important.

On May 8, 2021, in honor of Audie Murphy and on the 76th anniversary of VE Day - commemorating the end of fighting in the European Theater of Operations during World War II - a "Sister City Pact" between Farmersville and Holtzwihr, France was signed. This ceremony was to cement the common bond between the two cities and recognize Murphy's heroism at the Battle of Holtzwihr on January 26, 1945.. Previously, on January 29, 2020, the people of Holtzwihr erected a memorial to the men who fought and died with the U.S. Army’s 3rd Infantry Division under command of the 1st French Army. Murphy was selected and memorialized as the soldier who best exemplified the courage, valor and sacrifice the soldiers made in their battle with the Nazi enemy.

== Geography ==
Farmersville is located in northeast Collin County, approximately 45 miles from Dallas.

U.S. Route 380 crosses the south side of the city, leading west 18 miles (29 km) to McKinney and east 15 miles (24 km) to Greenville. Texas State Highway 78 passes through the west side of Farmersville, leading north 10 miles (16 km) to Blue Ridge and southwest 27 miles (43 km) to Garland. The northern portion of Lavon Lake is at the western most city limits, north and south of U.S. Route 380.

According to the United States Census Bureau, Farmersville has a total area of 4.0 square miles (10.4 km^{2}), of which 3.8 square miles (9.9 km^{2}) is land and 0.2 square miles (0.4 km^{2}), or 4.18%, is water.

=== Climate ===
The climate in this area is characterized by hot, humid summers and generally mild to cool winters. According to the Köppen Climate Classification system, Farmersville has a humid subtropical climate, abbreviated "Cfa" on climate maps.

== Demographics ==
As of the 2020 census, Farmersville had a population of 3,612.

=== Racial and ethnic composition ===
Racial composition as of the 2020 census
Race	Number	Percent
White	2,481	68.7%
Black or African American	236	6.5%
American Indian and Alaska Native	24	0.7%
Asian	19	0.5%
Native Hawaiian and Other Pacific Islander	3	0.1%
Some other race	405	11.2%
Two or more races	444	12.3%
Hispanic or Latino (of any race)	1,056	29.2%

=== 2020 census ===
The median age was 36.1 years, with 27.5% of residents under the age of 18 and 15.8% of residents 65 years of age or older.

For every 100 females there were 90.4 males, and for every 100 females age 18 and over there were 88.5 males age 18 and over.

There were 1,289 households in Farmersville, of which 41.0% had children under the age of 18 living in them. Of all households, 49.7% were married-couple households, 15.7% were households with a male householder and no spouse or partner present, and 28.3% were households with a female householder and no spouse or partner present. About 22.5% of all households were made up of individuals and 10.6% had someone living alone who was 65 years of age or older.

There were 1,380 housing units, of which 6.6% were vacant. The homeowner vacancy rate was 1.6% and the rental vacancy rate was 5.5%.

0.0% of residents lived in urban areas, while 100.0% lived in rural areas.

== Education ==
The city is served by the Farmersville Independent School District. Collin College operates a branch campus in Farmersville.

== Media ==
The Farmersville Times is a weekly newspaper published in the city. The newspaper was established in 1885, and is part of C&S Media Publications Inc.

== Notable people ==
- Bart Barber, pastor of First Baptist Farmersville, 64th President of the Southern Baptist Convention
- Stevie Benton, bassist for American heavy metal band Drowning Pool, resided in Farmersville and attended Farmersville High School
- Gussie Nell Davis (1906-1993), educator and founder of Kilgore College Rangerettes, the first all-girl drill team to perform on a collegiate football field, and recognized as the best in the world
- Reid Dillon, guitarist for Flatland Cavalry - a country and Americana band formed in Lubbock, TX - Farmersville High School Class of 2013
- Herb Ellis (1921–2010), jazz guitarist, born in Farmersville
- Jim Haislip (1891-1970), Pitcher, Major League Baseball for the Philadelphia Phillies
- Monty "Hawkeye" Henson, three-time PRCA world champion saddle bronc rider and world famous rodeo cowboy, born in Farmersville
- Jim Hess, former college coach and NFL scout
- Tex McDonald (1891-1943) - (born Charles C. Crabtree) - Right Fielder, Major League Baseball for the Cincinnati Reds, Boston Braves, Pittsburgh Rebels, and the Buffalo Buffeds/Blues
- John Monroe, infielder, Major League Baseball for the New York Giants and Philadelphia Phillies
- Loren Murchison, double gold medalist in the 4x100m relay at the 1920 and 1924 Olympic Games, on teams that set world records in the finals each time
- Audie Murphy, United States' most decorated combat soldier of World War II, spent his childhood in Kingston, Texas and surrounding areas, he attended school in Celeste, Texas and lived in Farmersville before his enlistment
- Nick Nicholson (American football) (1925-2010), head football coach, Abilene Christian University
- Archie J. Old, Jr. (1906-1984), Lieutenant General, United States Air Force, flew 43 combat missions against Germany during World War II
- Tex Watson, murderer and member of the Manson Family, best known for his involvement (with Susan Atkins) in the stabbing murders of Sharon Tate and her unborn child, grew up in Copeville and attended Farmersville Independent School District
