= Louisiana Tech vs. Louisiana–Monroe football rivalry =

American college football rivalry

I-20 Showdown

- Louisiana Tech Bulldogs Louisiana–Monroe Warhawks
- Sport: Football
- First meeting: September 26, 1953; Louisiana Tech, 61–6
- Latest meeting: October 17, 2026; Louisiana Tech, 24–0
- Next meeting: 2027

Statistics
- Total meetings: 44
- All-time series: Louisiana Tech leads, 30–14
- Largest victory: Louisiana Tech, 61–6 (1953)
- Longest win streak: Louisiana Tech, 7 (1971–1977), (1990–present)
- Current win streak: Louisiana Tech, 7 (1990–present)

Locations of Louisiana Tech and Louisiana–Monroe

The Louisiana Tech vs. Louisiana–Monroe football rivalry is an American college football rivalry between the Louisiana Tech Bulldogs and the Louisiana–Monroe Warhawks (formerly the Northeast Louisiana Indians). The two schools are located 35 miles apart from each other on I-20 in North Louisiana. The two teams have met 44 times on the football field, with Louisiana Tech currently holding a 30–14 lead in the all-time series.

== History ==
The matchup began in 1953 as a conference game, following Northeast Louisiana State's move to the Gulf States Conference. After the Gulf States Conference dissolved at the end of the 1970 football season, Louisiana Tech joined the Southland Conference, while Northeast Louisiana remained a football independent school, and the yearly game continued as a non-conference matchup. The game once again became a conference matchup in 1982, when Northeast Louisiana joined the Southland Conference, before once again moving to a non-conference game following Louisiana Tech's departure from the Southland following the 1986 season.

The early history of the series was dominated by Louisiana Tech, as the Bulldogs won 20 of the first 25 meetings between the two schools. Following the end of the 1978 season, long-time Louisiana Tech head coach Maxie Lambright resigned, and Tech decided to hire Arkansas assistant coach Larry Beightol as their new head coach, instead of promoting long-time Lambright assistant coach (and Louisiana Tech alum), Pat Collins. Collins was subsequently hired as an assistant coach at Northeast Louisiana, before being promoted to head coach following John David Crow's resignation at the end of the 1980 season. Prior to Collins' first game against Tech as a head coach, he drew the ire of Tech fans by using insider information gleaned during his time as a Tech assistant to complain to Southland Conference officials and have the Bulldogs' star linebacker, Ed Jackson, declared ineligible to play. The game, dubbed the "Ed Jackson Bowl," quickly turned into a rout, as Northeast Louisiana dominated the Bulldogs en route to a 35–0 victory in front of 23,500 fans at Tech's Joe Aillet Stadium. Collins spent eight seasons as coach at Northeast Louisiana and went 6–2 all time against his alma mater. Following Collins' tenure, however, Louisiana Tech once again began to dominate the matchup, winning 7 of the last 8 meetings, with a 1989 game that the Bulldogs initially won on the field, but later forfeited the victory, as the only blemish.

In 2000, the matchup came to an end, with a 42–19 Tech victory in Monroe. Following the 2000 season, Louisiana Tech became a member of the Western Athletic Conference, while Louisiana–Monroe became a member of the Sun Belt Conference in 2001. Since then, both teams have played in different conferences, and the game has not been scheduled. In 2013, Louisiana Tech left the WAC and joined Conference USA.

== 2012–13 bowl season ==
Following the 2012 season, Louisiana–Monroe was invited to play in the Independence Bowl in Shreveport. Louisiana Tech was also invited to play in the game but instead chose to let the Independence Bowl's time deadline pass in hopes of an offer from another bowl that never materialized. The Bulldogs did not end up playing in any bowl game despite boasting the nation's top scoring offense. Several members of the media have speculated that Louisiana Tech's reluctance to play in the Independence Bowl may have been based on their reluctance to renew their rivalry with ULM, though Tech officials have denied that this was their motivation in seeking a different bowl game.

== Attempted renewal ==
In the summer of 2013, at his inaugural press conference, Louisiana–Monroe's new athletic director, Brian Wickstrom, announced his intention to play Louisiana Tech in football every year. In a press conference with a local newspaper, Dr. Les Guice, Louisiana Tech's president, indicated that an offer would not be heavily considered, as the future out-of-conference schedule was full. Louisiana Tech's new athletic director Tommy McClelland confirmed that Tech would not pursue any games with Louisiana–Monroe, as they are "grow[ing] a national brand" and that playing Louisiana–Monroe could not help Louisiana Tech accomplish that goal. In 2020, the rivalry is expected to be renewed amid a slew of cancelled games due to the COVID-19 pandemic. On November 16, 2020, both schools announced that the November 21, 2020, game that was scheduled to be held at Independence Stadium in Shreveport was canceled due to continuing COVID-19 concerns within the Warhawk program.

== Series Renewal ==
On March 29, 2023, it was announced that the Bulldogs and Warhawks would resume their rivalry, after nearly 30 years of dormancy. The first game will be played at Louisiana Tech on September 21, 2030; the second game will be played at Louisiana-Monroe on September 13, 2031. However, on July 15, 2025, Louisiana Tech announced it had accepted an invitation to join the Sun Belt Conference. Tech's change in conference affiliation will renew the rivalry as an annual match-up, as the Bulldogs and Warhawks will both compete in the SBC's West Division.

== Game results ==
Louisiana Tech victories	Louisiana–Monroe victories	Forfeits

No.	Date	Location	Winner	Score
1	September 26, 1953	Ruston, LA	Louisiana Tech	61–6
2	November 20, 1954	Monroe, LA	Louisiana Tech	51–6
3	November 19, 1955	Ruston, LA	Louisiana Tech	34–14
4	November 17, 1956	Monroe, LA	Northeast Louisiana State	7–0
5	November 23, 1957	Ruston, LA	Louisiana Tech	15–6
6	November 22, 1958	Monroe, LA	Louisiana Tech	46–21
7	November 21, 1959	Ruston, LA	Louisiana Tech	27–0
8	November 19, 1960	Monroe, LA	Louisiana Tech	20–15
9	November 18, 1961	Ruston, LA	Louisiana Tech	27–7
10	November 10, 1962	Monroe, LA	Northeast Louisiana State	13–6
11	November 23, 1963	Ruston, LA	Louisiana Tech	28–7
12	November 21, 1964	Monroe, LA	Louisiana Tech	23–0
13	November 20, 1965	Ruston, LA	Louisiana Tech	54–7
14	November 19, 1966	Monroe, LA	Northeast Louisiana State	14–6
15	November 18, 1967	Ruston, LA	Northeast Louisiana State	21–14
16	November 23, 1968	Monroe, LA	Louisiana Tech	25–10
17	November 22, 1969	Ruston, LA	Louisiana Tech	34–6
18	November 21, 1970	Monroe, LA	Northeast Louisiana	28–21
19	November 20, 1971	Ruston, LA	Louisiana Tech	23–0
20	November 18, 1972	Monroe, LA	Louisiana Tech	10–6
21	November 17, 1973	Ruston, LA	Louisiana Tech	40–0
22	November 23, 1974	Monroe, LA	Louisiana Tech	26–10
23	November 8, 1975	Ruston, LA	Louisiana Tech	41–23

No.	Date	Location	Winner	Score
24	November 20, 1976	Monroe, LA	Louisiana Tech	55–35
25	November 26, 1977	Ruston, LA	Louisiana Tech	20–0
26	November 18, 1978	Monroe, LA	Northeast Louisiana	18–0
27	November 17, 1979	Ruston, LA	Louisiana Tech	13–10
28	November 22, 1980	Monroe, LA	Northeast Louisiana	19–14
29	October 3, 1981	Ruston, LA	Northeast Louisiana	35–0
30	October 9, 1982	Monroe, LA	Louisiana Tech	17–10
31	November 5, 1983	Ruston, LA	Northeast Louisiana	17–0
32	November 3, 1984	Monroe, LA	Northeast Louisiana	12–10
33	November 9, 1985	Ruston, LA	Northeast Louisiana	13–9
34	November 8, 1986	Monroe, LA	Northeast Louisiana	20–6
35	September 12, 1987	Ruston, LA	Northeast Louisiana	44–7
36	November 19, 1988	Monroe, LA	Louisiana Tech	23–0
37	November 4, 1989	Ruston, LA	Louisiana Tech †	24–6
38	November 3, 1990	Monroe, LA	Louisiana Tech	31–7
39	November 2, 1991	Ruston, LA	Louisiana Tech	35–10
40	September 13, 1997	Ruston, LA	Louisiana Tech	17–16
41	October 10, 1998	Monroe, LA	Louisiana Tech	44–14
42	November 6, 1999	Ruston, LA	Louisiana Tech	58–17
43	November 11, 2000	Monroe, LA	Louisiana Tech	42–19
44	October 17, 2026	Monroe, LA	Louisiana Tech	24–0
Series: Louisiana Tech leads 30–14
† Louisiana Tech forfeited.

== See also ==
- List of NCAA college football rivalry games
