= Gulf Star Conference =

- Conference: NCAA
- Founded: 1984
- Folded: 1987
- Division: Division II
- No. of teams: 6
- Region: Southern United States

Locations
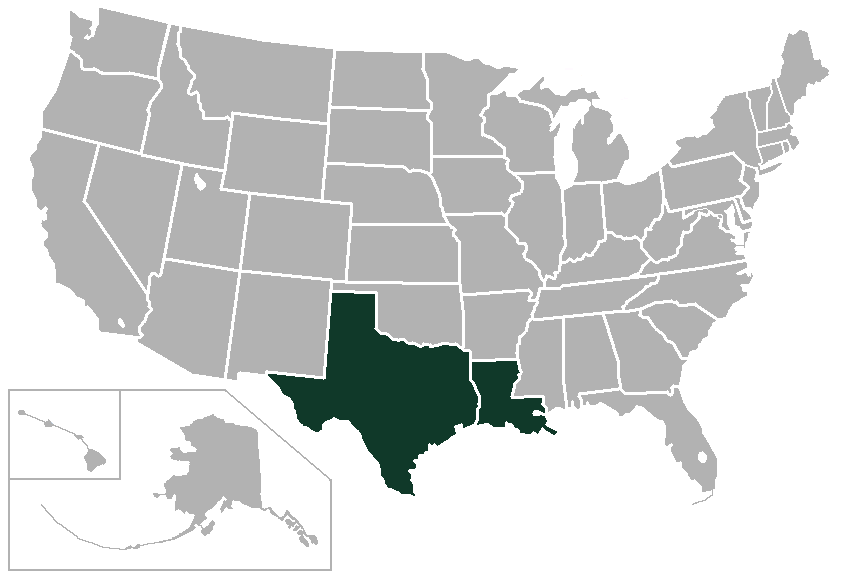

The Gulf Star Conference was an NCAA Division II conference that existed for three academic years from 1984–85 to 1986–87. All of the schools subsequently joined the Southland Conference. Dave Waples was the only commissioner, with the conference office located in Lake Charles, Louisiana.

== Aftermath ==
Although the Southland eventually took in all of the former Gulf Star schools, only four (Northwestern State, Sam Houston State, Stephen F. Austin, and Southwest Texas State) joined the Southland immediately upon the Gulf Star's demise. The other two Gulf Star members, Nicholls State and Southeastern Louisiana, initially became independents. Nicholls State joined the SLC for the 1991–92 school year. SLU became a member of the Trans America Athletic Conference (now known as the Atlantic Sun Conference) in that same year, and moved to the Southland in 1997–98. To date, only Nicholls State, Northwestern State, and Southeastern Louisiana remain in the Southland Conference, as Southwest Texas State (now known as Texas State) joined the Sun Belt Conference in 2013 while Sam Houston State and Stephen F. Austin moved to the Western Athletic Conference in 2021.

== Member schools ==
=== Final members ===
Institution	Nickname	Location	Founded	Affiliation	Joined (Note: Represents the calendar year when fall sports competition begins.)	Left (Note: Represents the calendar year when spring sports competition ends.)	Subsequent conference(s)	Current conference
Nicholls State University	Colonels	Thibodaux, Louisiana	1948	Public	1984	1987	D-I Independent (1987–91)	Southland (1991–present)
Northwestern State University	Demons	Natchitoches, Louisiana	1884	Public	1984	1987	Southland (1987–present)	
Sam Houston State University	Bearkats	Huntsville, Texas	1879	Public	1984	1987	Southland (1987–2021); Western (WAC) (2021–2023)	C-USA (2023–present)
Southeastern Louisiana University	Lions	Hammond, Louisiana	1925	Public	1984	1987	D-I Independent (1987–91); Trans America (TAAC) (Note: Currently known as the Atlantic Sun Conference since 2001.) (1991–97)	Southland (1997–present)
Southwest Texas State University (Note: Currently known as Texas State University since 2003.)	Bobcats	San Marcos, Texas	1899	Public	1984	1987	Southland (1987–2012); Western (WAC) (2012–13)	Sun Belt (2013–present) (Pac-12 in 2026)
Stephen F. Austin State University	Lumberjacks & Ladyjacks	Nacogdoches, Texas	1921	Public	1984	1987	Southland (1987–2021); Western (WAC) (2021–2024)	Southland (2024–present)

=== Membership timeline ===
Full member (all sports) Full member (non-football) Associate member (football) Associate member (sport)

== Championships ==
=== Baseball ===
Gulf Star Conference baseball champions
Season	Team	Record
1985	Nicholls State	12–6
1985	Sam Houston State	12–6
1986	Sam Houston State	16–4
1987	Sam Houston State	17–3

=== Football ===
Gulf Star Conference football champions
Season	Team	Record
1984	Nicholls State	4–1
1984	Northwestern State	4–1
1985	Sam Houston State	4–1
1985	Stephen F. Austin	4–1
1986	Sam Houston State	3–1

=== Men's basketball ===
Gulf Star Conference basketball champions
Season	Team	Record
1984–85	Southeastern Louisiana	
1985–86	Sam Houston State	
1986–87	Stephen F. Austin	
