= 1984 Florida A&M Rattlers football team =

American college football season

1984 Florida A&M Rattlers football
- Conference: Independent
- Record: 3–7–1
- Head coach: Rudy Hubbard (11th season)
- Home stadium: Bragg Memorial Stadium

1984 NCAA Division I-AA independents football standings
	Conf.			Overall
Team	W	L	T	W		L		T
Tennessee State		–		11	–	0	–	0
Eastern Washington		–		7	–	2	–	1
Georgia Southern		–		8	–	3	–	0
No. 15 Holy Cross		–		8	–	3	–	0
No. 19 Delaware		–		8	–	3	–	0
No. 12 Richmond ^		–		8	–	4	–	0
James Madison		–		6	–	5	–	0
William & Mary		–		6	–	5	–	0
Bucknell		–		5	–	5	–	0
Colgate		–		5	–	5	–	0
Lafayette		–		5	–	5	–	0
Lehigh		–		5	–	6	–	0
Florida A&M		–		3	–	6	–	1
Northeastern		–		3	–	7	–	0
Western Kentucky		–		2	–	9	–	0
^ – NCAA Division I-AA playoff participant; Rankings from NCAA Division I-AA Football Committee poll

The 1984 Florida A&M Rattlers football team represented Florida A&M University as an independent during the 1984 NCAA Division I-AA football season. Led by 11th-year head coach Rudy Hubbard, the Rattlers compiled a record of 3–7–1.

== Schedule ==
Date	Opponent	Site	Result	Attendance	Source
September 1	vs. Georgia Southern	Memorial Stadium; Savannah, GA	L 0–14	12,743	
September 8	Fort Valley State	Bragg Memorial Stadium; Tallahassee, FL	L 14–19	10,000	
September 15	vs. No. 1 (D-II) Troy State	Gator Bowl Stadium; Jacksonville, FL (Bold City Classic)	L 3–17	20,382–20,442	
September 21	at No. 10 Tennessee State	Vanderbilt Stadium; Nashville, TN	L 20–41	25,000	
September 29	Kentucky State	Bragg Memorial Stadium; Tallahassee, FL	W 42–14		
October 6	at Jackson State	Mississippi Veterans Memorial Stadium; Jackson, MS	T 10–10		
October 13	Morris Brown	Bragg Memorial Stadium; Tallahassee, FL	W 33–12	24,533	
October 27	vs. No. 4 Alcorn State	Tampa Stadium; Tampa, FL (Orange Blossom Classic)	L 14–51	11,600	
November 3	Prairie View A&M	Bragg Memorial Stadium; Tallahassee, FL	W 41–8		
November 10	at Southern	A. W. Mumford Stadium; Baton Rouge, LA	L 18–28		
November 17	at No. 10 Eastern Kentucky	Hanger Field; Richmond, KY	L 14–21		
Rankings from NCAA Division I-AA Football Committee Poll released prior to the game
