= Jerry Berndt =

American football player and coach (1938–2022)

Biographical details
- Born: May 11, 1938
- Died: December 3, 2022 (aged 84)

Playing career
- c. 1960: Wisconsin–Superior

Coaching career (HC unless noted)
- 1969: Toledo (GA)
- 1970: Streetsboro HS (OH)
- 1971–1978: Dartmouth (assistant)
- 1979–1980: DePauw
- 1981–1985: Penn
- 1986–1988: Rice
- 1989–1992: Temple
- 1994–1999: Missouri (OC/QB)

Administrative career (AD unless noted)
- 1986–1988: Rice

Head coaching record
- Overall: 55–87–3 (college)

Accomplishments and honors

Championships
- 4 Ivy (1982–1985)

Jerry Berndt (May 11, 1938 – December 3, 2022) was an American football player, coach, and college athletics administrator. He served as the head football coach at DePauw University, the University of Pennsylvania, Rice University, and Temple University. In two years at DePauw (1979–1980), Berndt guided the Tigers to a 9–9–1 mark, including a 7–2–1 mark in his second season. From 1981 to 1985, he coached at Penn and compiled a 29–18–2 record. In 1984, he won Ivy League Coach of the Year honors. From 1986 to 1988, he coached at Rice, and compiled a 6–27 record. This included a 0–11 season in 1988. From 1989 to 1992, he coached at Temple, where he compiled an 11–33 record. He also served as the offensive coordinator and quarterbacks coach at the University of Missouri from 1994 to 1999. He played college football at Bowling Green State University.

Berndt died on December 3, 2022, aged 84.

== Coaching career ==
Berndt began his coaching career in the high school football ranks in 1962. He was an assistant at Libbey High School in Toledo, Ohio and at Bedford High School in Temperance, Michigan. In 1969, he worked as a graduate assistant at the University of Toledo under head coach Frank Lauterbur. The next year Berndt served as the head football coach at Streetsboro High School in Streetsboro, Ohio. From 1971 to 1978 he was an assistant football coach at Dartmouth College.

== Head coaching record ==
=== College ===
Year	Team	Overall	Conference	Standing	Bowl/playoffs
DePauw Tigers (NCAA Division III independent) (1979–1980)
1979	DePauw	2–7			
1980	DePauw	7–2–1			
DePauw:		9–9–1			
Penn Quakers (Ivy League) (1981–1985)
1981	Penn	1–9	1–6	T–7th	
1982	Penn	7–3	5–2	T–1st	
1983	Penn	6–3–1	5–1–1	T–1st	
1984	Penn	8–1	7–0	1st	
1985	Penn	7–2–1	6–1	1st	
Penn:		29–18–2	24–10–1		
Rice Owls (Southwest Conference) (1986–1988)
1986	Rice	4–7	2–6	7th	
1987	Rice	2–9	0–7	8th	
1988	Rice	0–11	0–7	8th	
Rice:		6–27	2–20		
Temple Owls (NCAA Division I-A independent) (1989–1990)
1989	Temple	1–10			
1990	Temple	7–4			
Temple Owls (Big East Conference) (1989–1990)
1991	Temple	2–9	0–5	8th	
1992	Temple	1–10	0–6	8th	
Temple:		11–33	0–11		
Total:		55–87–3			
National championship Conference title Conference division title or championship game berth
