= 1984 Lafayette Leopards football team =

American college football season

1984 Lafayette Leopards football
- Conference: Independent
- Record: 5–5
- Head coach: Bill Russo (4th season)
- Captain: Frank Corbo
- Home stadium: Fisher Field

1984 NCAA Division I-AA independents football standings
	Conf.			Overall
Team	W	L	T	W		L		T
Tennessee State		–		11	–	0	–	0
Eastern Washington		–		7	–	2	–	1
Georgia Southern		–		8	–	3	–	0
No. 15 Holy Cross		–		8	–	3	–	0
No. 19 Delaware		–		8	–	3	–	0
No. 12 Richmond ^		–		8	–	4	–	0
James Madison		–		6	–	5	–	0
William & Mary		–		6	–	5	–	0
Bucknell		–		5	–	5	–	0
Colgate		–		5	–	5	–	0
Lafayette		–		5	–	5	–	0
Lehigh		–		5	–	6	–	0
Florida A&M		–		3	–	6	–	1
Northeastern		–		3	–	7	–	0
Western Kentucky		–		2	–	9	–	0
^ – NCAA Division I-AA playoff participant; Rankings from NCAA Division I-AA Football Committee poll

The 1984 Lafayette Leopards football team was an American football team that represented Lafayette College as an independent during the 1984 NCAA Division I-AA football season. In their fourth year under head coach Bill Russo, the Leopards compiled a 5–5 record. Frank Corbo was the team captain. Lafayette played home games at Fisher Field on College Hill in Easton, Pennsylvania.

== Schedule ==
Date	Opponent	Site	Result	Attendance	Source
September 8	at Rhode Island	Meade Stadium; Kingston, RI	L 10–31	6,858	
September 15	New Hampshire	Fisher Field; Easton, PA	L 7–21	4,200	
September 22	Kutztown	Fisher Field; Easton, PA	W 16–3		
September 29	at Columbia	Wien Stadium; New York, NY	W 23–14	4,034	
October 6	at Maine	Alfond Stadium; Orono, ME	L 20–22	5,000	
October 13	Connecticut	Fisher Field; Easton, PA	W 20–13	11,300	
October 20	at No. 20 Colgate	Andy Kerr Stadium; Hamilton, NY	L 20–41	6,500	
November 3	at Bucknell	Memorial Stadium; Lewisburg, PA	L 3–10	7,600	
November 10	East Stroudsburg	Fisher Field; Easton, PA	W 44–38	4,250	
November 17	Lehigh	Fisher Field; Easton, PA (The Rivalry)	W 28–7	17,000	
Rankings from NCAA Division I-AA Football Committee Poll released prior to the game
