= 1984 South Carolina State Bulldogs football team =

American college football season

1984 South Carolina State Bulldogs football
- Conference: Mid-Eastern Athletic Conference
- Record: 4–6–1 (2–2 MEAC)
- Head coach: Bill Davis (6th season)
- Home stadium: State College Stadium

1984 Mid-Eastern Athletic Conference football standings
	Conf.					Overall
Team	W		L		T	W		L		T
Bethune–Cookman $	4	–	0	–	0	7	–	3	–	0
Delaware State	3	–	1	–	0	8	–	2	–	0
South Carolina State	2	–	2	–	0	4	–	6	–	1
North Carolina A&T	1	–	3	–	0	2	–	8	–	0
Howard	0	–	4	–	0	2	–	8	–	0
Morgan State	0	–	0	–	0	0	–	11	–	0
$ – Conference champion; Morgan State games did not count as conference games. Morgan State was NCAA Division II. All the other teams were classified as I-AA.

The 1984 South Carolina State Bulldogs football team represented South Carolina State College (now known as South Carolina State University) as a member of the Mid-Eastern Athletic Conference (MEAC) during the 1984 NCAA Division I-AA football season. Led by sixth-year head coach Bill Davis, the Bulldogs compiled an overall record of 4–6–1, with a mark of 2–2 in conference play, and finished third in the MEAC.

== Schedule ==
Date	Opponent	Site	Result	Attendance	Source
September 1	at Furman*	Paladin Stadium; Greenville, SC	L 10–28	12,766	
September 8	vs. Delaware State	Franklin Field; Philadelphia, PA (Mideastern Athletic Conference Classic)	L 36–50		
September 15	at North Carolina A&T	Aggie Stadium; Greensboro, NC (rivalry)	W 46–7		
September 22	Howard	State College Stadium; Orangeburg, SC	W 48–15	8,327	
September 29	No. 10 Alcorn State*	State College Stadium; Orangeburg, SC	L 6–41		
October 6	at Johnson C. Smith*	American Legion Memorial Stadium; Charlotte, NC	W 14–6	5,436	
October 13	Morgan State^{†}	State College Stadium; Orangeburg, SC	W 29–9	17,641	
October 20	vs. Bethune–Cookman	Florida Citrus Bowl; Orlando, FL	L 23–24	9,700	
November 3	Virginia Union*	State College Stadium; Orangeburg, SC	T 16–16	3,720	
November 10	Grambling State*	State College Stadium; Orangeburg, SC	L 7–8	10,071	
November 17	at Appalachian State*	Conrad Stadium; Boone, NC	L 0–24	8,142	
*Non-conference game; ^{†}Homecoming; Rankings from NCAA Division I-AA Football Committee Poll released prior to the game
