= 1984 Penn Quakers football team =

American college football season

1984 Penn Quakers football

Ivy League champion
- Conference: Ivy League
- Record: 8–1 (7–0 Ivy)
- Head coach: Jerry Berndt (4th season)
- Captains: Kevin Bradley; Lal Heneghan
- Home stadium: Franklin Field

1984 Ivy League football standings
	Conf.					Overall
Team	W		L		T	W		L		T
Penn $	7	–	0	–	0	8	–	1	–	0
Yale	5	–	2	–	0	6	–	3	–	0
Harvard	5	–	2	–	0	5	–	4	–	0
Brown	4	–	3	–	0	4	–	5	–	0
Princeton	3	–	4	–	0	4	–	5	–	0
Cornell	2	–	5	–	0	2	–	7	–	0
Dartmouth	2	–	5	–	0	2	–	7	–	0
Columbia	0	–	7	–	0	0	–	9	–	0
$ – Conference champion

The 1984 Penn Quakers football team was an American football team that represented the University of Pennsylvania during the 1984 NCAA Division I-AA football season. After two years of shared championships, Penn won the Ivy League title outright in 1984.

== Background ==
During its fourth year under head coach Jerry Berndt, the Quakers compiled an 8–1 record and outscored opponents 286 to 152. Lal Heneghan and Kevin Bradley were the team captains.

Penn's undefeated (7–0) conference record topped the Ivy League standings. The Quakers outscored Ivy opponents 254 to 90. It was the first time since 1970 that any team had gone undefeated in Ivy League play.

The Quakers' only loss came in an away game against a non-league, Division I-A opponent, Army.

Despite beating every Division I-AA opponent it faced, Penn did not appear in the weekly top 20 national rankings.

Penn played its home games at Franklin Field adjacent to the university's campus in Philadelphia, Pennsylvania.

== Schedule ==
Date	Opponent	Site	Result	Attendance	Source
September 22	at Dartmouth	Memorial Field; Hanover, NH	W 55–24	14,324	
September 29	Davidson*	Franklin Field; Philadelphia, PA	W 19–14	12,309	
October 6	Columbia	Franklin Field; Philadelphia, PA	W 35–7	8,469	
October 13	at Brown	Brown Stadium; Providence, RI	W 41–14	12,614	
October 20	at Army*	Michie Stadium; West Point, NY	L 13–48	59,075	
October 27	Yale	Franklin Field; Philadelphia, PA	W 34–21	36,975	
November 3	at Princeton	Palmer Stadium; Princeton, NJ (rivalry)	W 27–17	23,275	
November 10	Harvard	Franklin Field; Philadelphia, PA (rivalry)	W 38–7	38,810	
November 17	at Cornell	Schoellkopf Field; Ithaca, NY (rivalry)	W 24–0	5,800	
*Non-conference game

== Roster ==
1984 Penn Quakers football team roster
Players			Coaches
Offense: Pos. / # / Name / Class; QB / 7 / Jim Crocicchia / So	Defense: Pos. / # / Name / Class	Special teams: Pos. / # / Name / Class	Head coach: Jerry Berndt; Coordinators/assistant coaches Legend: (C) Team captain; (S) Suspended; (I) Ineligible; Injured; Redshirt
