= 1984 Harvard Crimson football team =

American college football season

1984 Harvard Crimson football
- Conference: Ivy League
- Record: 5–4 (5–2 Ivy)
- Head coach: Joe Restic (14th season)
- Captain: Steven W. Abbott
- Home stadium: Harvard Stadium

1984 Ivy League football standings
	Conf.					Overall
Team	W		L		T	W		L		T
Penn $	7	–	0	–	0	8	–	1	–	0
Yale	5	–	2	–	0	6	–	3	–	0
Harvard	5	–	2	–	0	5	–	4	–	0
Brown	4	–	3	–	0	4	–	5	–	0
Princeton	3	–	4	–	0	4	–	5	–	0
Cornell	2	–	5	–	0	2	–	7	–	0
Dartmouth	2	–	5	–	0	2	–	7	–	0
Columbia	0	–	7	–	0	0	–	9	–	0
$ – Conference champion

The 1984 Harvard Crimson football team was an American football team that represented Harvard University during the 1984 NCAA Division I-AA football season. The Crimson tied for second in the Ivy League.

In their 12th year under head coach Joe Restic, the Crimson compiled a 5–4 record but were outscored 196 to 182 by opponents. Steven W. Abbott was the team captain.

Harvard's 5–2 conference record tied for second place in the Ivy League standings. The Crimson outscored Ivy opponents 155 to 139.

Harvard played its home games at Harvard Stadium in the Allston neighborhood of Boston, Massachusetts.

== Schedule ==
Date	Opponent	Site	Result	Attendance	Source
September 22	at Columbia	Wien Stadium; New York, NY	W 35–21	10,500	
September 29	No. 4 Holy Cross*	Harvard Stadium; Boston, MA	L 14–24	19,500	
October 6	at Army*	Michie Stadium; West Point, NY	L 11–33	40,504	
October 13	Cornell	Harvard Stadium; Boston, MA	W 24–18	11,500	
October 20	at Dartmouth	Memorial Field; Hanover, NH (rivalry)	W 21–7	20,088	
October 27	at Princeton	Palmer Stadium; Princeton, NJ (rivalry)	W 17–15	24,234	
November 3	Brown	Harvard Stadium; Boston, MA	W 24–10	15,000	
November 10	at Penn	Franklin Field; Philadelphia, PA	L 7–38	38,810	
November 17	Yale	Harvard Stadium; Boston, MA (The Game)	L 27–30	40,000	
*Non-conference game; Rankings from NCAA Division I-AA Football Committee Poll released prior to the game
