= 1984 North Carolina A&T Aggies football team =

American college football season

1984 North Carolina A&T Aggies football
- Conference: Mid-Eastern Athletic Conference
- Record: 2–8 (1–3 MEAC)
- Head coach: Mo Forte (3rd season)
- Home stadium: Aggie Stadium

1984 Mid-Eastern Athletic Conference football standings
	Conf.					Overall
Team	W		L		T	W		L		T
Bethune–Cookman $	4	–	0	–	0	7	–	3	–	0
Delaware State	3	–	1	–	0	8	–	2	–	0
South Carolina State	2	–	2	–	0	4	–	6	–	1
North Carolina A&T	1	–	3	–	0	2	–	8	–	0
Howard	0	–	4	–	0	2	–	8	–	0
Morgan State	0	–	0	–	0	0	–	11	–	0
$ – Conference champion; Morgan State games did not count as conference games. Morgan State was NCAA Division II. All the other teams were classified as I-AA.

The 1984 North Carolina A&T Aggies football team represented North Carolina A&T State University as member of the Mid-Eastern Athletic Conference (MEAC) during the 1984 NCAA Division I-AA football season. Led by third-year head coach Mo Forte, the Aggies compiled an overall record of 2–8, with a mark of 1–3 in conference play, and finished fourth in the MEAC.

== Schedule ==
Date	Opponent	Site	Result	Attendance	Source
September 8	Winston-Salem State*	Aggie Stadium; Greensboro, NC (rivalry)	L 21–35		
September 15	South Carolina State	Aggie Stadium; Greensboro, NC (rivalry)	L 7–46		
September 22	No. 9 Delaware State	Aggie Stadium; Greensboro, NC	L 7–56	5,000	
September 29	at Johnson C. Smith*	American Legion Memorial Stadium; Charlotte, NC	W 16–6	10,250	
October 6	Elizabeth City State*^{†}	Aggie Stadium; Greensboro, NC	L 21–31	12,500	
October 22	at Howard	RFK Stadium; Washington, DC	W 23–7	10,500	
October 27	Bethune–Cookman	Aggie Stadium; Greensboro, NC	L 15–23		
November 3	at Southern*	A. W. Mumford Stadium; Baton Rouge, LA	L 0–41		
November 10	at North Carolina Central*	O'Kelly Stadium; Durham, NC (rivalry)	L 10–49		
November 17	at No. 1 Tennessee State*	Hale Stadium; Nashville, TN	L 14–44	9,000	
*Non-conference game; ^{†}Homecoming; Rankings from NCAA Division I-AA Football Committee Poll released prior to the game
