= 1984 Dartmouth Big Green football team =

American college football season

1984 Dartmouth Big Green football
- Conference: Ivy League
- Record: 2–7 (2–5 Ivy)
- Head coach: Joe Yukica (7th season)
- Captains: Donald Pomeroy; Richard Weissman
- Home stadium: Memorial Field

1984 Ivy League football standings
	Conf.					Overall
Team	W		L		T	W		L		T
Penn $	7	–	0	–	0	8	–	1	–	0
Yale	5	–	2	–	0	6	–	3	–	0
Harvard	5	–	2	–	0	5	–	4	–	0
Brown	4	–	3	–	0	4	–	5	–	0
Princeton	3	–	4	–	0	4	–	5	–	0
Cornell	2	–	5	–	0	2	–	7	–	0
Dartmouth	2	–	5	–	0	2	–	7	–	0
Columbia	0	–	7	–	0	0	–	9	–	0
$ – Conference champion

The 1984 Dartmouth Big Green football team was an American football team that represented Dartmouth College during the 1984 NCAA Division I-AA football season. The Big Green tied for second-to-last in the Ivy League.

In its seventh season under head coach Joe Yukica, the team compiled a 2–7 record but was outscored 222 to 174. Donald Pomeroy and Richard Weissman were the team captains.

The Big Green's 2–5 conference record tied for sixth in the Ivy League standings. Dartmouth was outscored 158 to 144 by Ivy opponents.

Dartmouth played its home games at Memorial Field on the college campus in Hanover, New Hampshire.

== Schedule ==
Date	Opponent	Site	Result	Attendance	Source
September 22	Penn	Memorial Field; Hanover, NH	L 24–55	14,324	
September 29	New Hampshire*	Memorial Field; Hanover, NH (rivalry)	L 10–38	11,667	
October 6	at No. 3 Holy Cross*	Fitton Field; Worcester, MA	L 20–30	19,061	
October 13	at Yale	Yale Bowl; New Haven, CT	L 18–28	25,372	
October 20	Harvard	Memorial Field; Hanover, NH (rivalry)	L 7–21	20,088	
October 27	at Cornell	Schoellkopf Field; Ithaca, NY (rivalry)	L 10–13	16,200	
November 3	Columbia	Memorial Field; Hanover, NH	W 41–9	5,685	
November 10	at Brown	Brown Stadium; Providence, RI	W 27–11	10,248	
November 17	at Princeton	Palmer Stadium; Princeton, NJ	L 17–21	11,205	
*Non-conference game; Rankings from the latest NCAA Division I-AA poll released prior to the game
