= 1984 Western Kentucky Hilltoppers football team =

American college football season

1984 Western Kentucky Hilltoppers football
- Conference: Independent
- Record: 2–9
- Head coach: Dave Roberts (1st season)
- Defensive coordinator: Don Powers (1st season)
- Home stadium: L. T. Smith Stadium

1984 NCAA Division I-AA independents football standings
	Conf.			Overall
Team	W	L	T	W		L		T
Tennessee State		–		11	–	0	–	0
Eastern Washington		–		7	–	2	–	1
Georgia Southern		–		8	–	3	–	0
No. 15 Holy Cross		–		8	–	3	–	0
No. 19 Delaware		–		8	–	3	–	0
No. 12 Richmond ^		–		8	–	4	–	0
James Madison		–		6	–	5	–	0
William & Mary		–		6	–	5	–	0
Bucknell		–		5	–	5	–	0
Colgate		–		5	–	5	–	0
Lafayette		–		5	–	5	–	0
Lehigh		–		5	–	6	–	0
Florida A&M		–		3	–	6	–	1
Northeastern		–		3	–	7	–	0
Western Kentucky		–		2	–	9	–	0
^ – NCAA Division I-AA playoff participant; Rankings from NCAA Division I-AA Football Committee poll

The 1984 Western Kentucky Hilltoppers football team represented Western Kentucky University as an independent during the 1984 NCAA Division I-AA football season. Led by first-year head coach Dave Roberts, the Hilltoppers compiled a record of 2–9.

== Schedule ==
Date	Opponent	Site	Result	Attendance	Source
September 8	Appalachian State*	L. T. Smith Stadium; Bowling Green, KY	L 16–17	14,000	
September 15	at Akron	Rubber Bowl; Akron, OH	L 7–42	23,984	
September 22	UCF*	L. T. Smith Stadium; Bowling Green, KY	L 34–35	8,500	
September 29	at Southeastern Louisiana	Strawberry Stadium; Hammond, LA	L 0–28	5,500	
October 6	at Louisville*	Cardinal Stadium; Louisville, KY	L 17–45	24,468	
October 13	Southwest Missouri State	L. T. Smith Stadium; Bowling Green, KY	L 10–25	6,500	
October 20	Eastern Kentucky	L. T. Smith Stadium; Bowling Green, KY (rivalry)	W 17–10	13,000	
October 27	at Morehead State	Jayne Stadium; Morehead, KY	W 33–31	3,500	
November 3	No. 14 Middle Tennessee^{†}	L. T. Smith Stadium; Bowling Green, KY (rivalry)	L 24–45	16,500	
November 10	at Eastern Illinois	O'Brien Field; Charleston, IL	L 19–50	10,864	
November 17	at No. 14 Murray State	Roy Stewart Stadium; Murray, KY (rivalry)	L 16–17	7,500	
*Non-conference game; ^{†}Homecoming; Rankings from NCAA Division I-AA Football Committee Poll released prior to the game
