= 1984 VMI Keydets football team =

American college football season

1984 VMI Keydets football
- Conference: Southern Conference
- Record: 1–9 (1–3 SoCon)
- Head coach: Bob Thalman (14th season)
- Home stadium: Alumni Memorial Field

1984 Southern Conference football standings
	Conf.					Overall
Team	W		L		T	W		L		T
No. 17 Chattanooga $^	5	–	1	–	0	6	–	5	–	0
No. 14 Western Carolina	5	–	2	–	0	8	–	3	–	0
The Citadel	4	–	2	–	0	7	–	4	–	0
No. 16 Furman	3	–	3	–	0	8	–	3	–	0
East Tennessee State	2	–	4	–	0	6	–	5	–	0
Marshall	2	–	4	–	0	6	–	5	–	0
Appalachian State	2	–	5	–	0	4	–	7	–	0
VMI	1	–	4	–	0	1	–	9	–	0
Davidson	0	–	2	–	0	2	–	8	–	0
$ – Conference champion; ^ – NCAA Division I-AA playoff participant; Rankings from NCAA Division I-AA Football Committee poll

The 1984 VMI Keydets football team was an American football team that represented the Virginia Military Institute (VMI) as a member of the Southern Conference (SoCon) during the 1984 NCAA Division I-AA football season. In their 14th year under head coach Bob Thalman, the team compiled an overall record of 1–9 with a mark of 1–3 in conference play, placing sixth in the SoCon. Thalman was fired at the conclusion of the season, and compiled an all time record of 54–94–3 during his tenure of head coach of the Keydets from 1971 through 1984.

== Schedule ==
Date	Opponent	Site	Result	Attendance	Source
September 8	at William & Mary*	Cary Field; Williamsburg, VA (rivalry)	L 13–24	11,300	
September 15	at Virginia*	Scott Stadium; Charlottesville, VA	L 7–35	28,997	
September 22	Western Carolina	Alumni Memorial Field; Lexington, VA	L 16–22	4,600	
September 29	Appalachian State	Alumni Memorial Field; Lexington, VA	W 20–16	5,400	
October 6	vs. Virginia Tech*	Foreman Field; Norfolk, VA (Oyster Bowl, rivalry)	L 7–54		
October 20	Chattanooga	Alumni Memorial Field; Lexington, VA	L 0–35	6,300	
October 27	at Richmond*	City Stadium; Richmond, VA (rivalry)	L 3–45	15,726	
November 3	at The Citadel	Johnson Hagood Stadium; Charleston, SC (rivalry)	L 24–27	18,550	
November 10	at James Madison*	JMU Stadium; Harrisonburg, VA	L 17–21		
November 17	Boston University*	Alumni Memorial Field; Lexington, VA	L 14–41	4,200	
*Non-conference game
