= 1984 Northeastern Huskies football team =

American college football season

1984 Northeastern Huskies football
- Conference: Independent
- Record: 3–7
- Head coach: Paul Pawlak (4th season)
- Home stadium: Parsons Field

1984 NCAA Division I-AA independents football standings
	Conf.			Overall
Team	W	L	T	W		L		T
Tennessee State		–		11	–	0	–	0
Eastern Washington		–		7	–	2	–	1
Georgia Southern		–		8	–	3	–	0
No. 15 Holy Cross		–		8	–	3	–	0
No. 19 Delaware		–		8	–	3	–	0
No. 12 Richmond ^		–		8	–	4	–	0
James Madison		–		6	–	5	–	0
William & Mary		–		6	–	5	–	0
Bucknell		–		5	–	5	–	0
Colgate		–		5	–	5	–	0
Lafayette		–		5	–	5	–	0
Lehigh		–		5	–	6	–	0
Florida A&M		–		3	–	6	–	1
Northeastern		–		3	–	7	–	0
Western Kentucky		–		2	–	9	–	0
^ – NCAA Division I-AA playoff participant; Rankings from NCAA Division I-AA Football Committee poll

The 1984 Northeastern Huskies football team was an American football team that represented Northeastern University as an independent during the 1984 NCAA Division I-AA football season. Led by fourth-year head coach Paul Pawlak, the team compiled a 3–7 record.

== Schedule ==
Date	Opponent	Site	Result	Attendance	Source
September 15	at Delaware State	Alumni Stadium; Dover, DE	L 0–35	5,000	
September 22	Bucknell	Parsons Field; Brookline, MA	W 34–33		
September 29	at UMass	Alumni Stadium; Hadley, MA	L 0–3	8,633	
October 6	Lehigh	Parsons Field; Brookline, MA	L 14–25	4,350	
October 13	No. 14 Rhode Island	Parsons Field; Brookline, MA	L 22–30	4,650	
October 20	at James Madison	JMU Stadium; Harrisonburg, VA	W 9–6	13,900	
October 27	No. 13 New Hampshire	Parsons Field; Brookline, MA	L 2–13		
November 3	at Maine	Alumni Field; Orono, ME	L 17–20		
November 10	No. 19 Richmond	Parsons Field; Brookline, MA	L 8–19	3,100	
November 16	at Springfield	Benedum Field; Springfield, MA	W 29–8		
Rankings from NCAA Division I-AA Football Committee Poll released prior to the game
