= 1984 Davidson Wildcats football team =

American college football season

1984 Davidson Wildcats football
- Conference: Southern Conference
- Record: 2–8 (0–5 SoCon)
- Head coach: Ed Farrell (11th season)
- Home stadium: Richardson Stadium

1984 Southern Conference football standings
	Conf.					Overall
Team	W		L		T	W		L		T
No. 17 Chattanooga $^	5	–	1	–	0	6	–	5	–	0
No. 14 Western Carolina	5	–	2	–	0	8	–	3	–	0
The Citadel	4	–	2	–	0	7	–	4	–	0
No. 16 Furman	3	–	3	–	0	8	–	3	–	0
East Tennessee State	2	–	4	–	0	6	–	5	–	0
Marshall	2	–	4	–	0	6	–	5	–	0
Appalachian State	2	–	5	–	0	4	–	7	–	0
VMI	1	–	4	–	0	1	–	9	–	0
Davidson	0	–	2	–	0	2	–	8	–	0
$ – Conference champion; ^ – NCAA Division I-AA playoff participant; Rankings from NCAA Division I-AA Football Committee poll

The 1984 Davidson Wildcats football team represented Davidson College as a member of the Southern Conference during the 1984 NCAA Division I-AA football season. Led by eleventh-year head coach Ed Farrell, the Wildcats compiled an overall record of 2–8 with a mark of 0–5 in conference play, placing last out of nine teams in the SoCon. Although not SoCon members, their games against Penn and James Madison were designated Southern Conference games.

== Schedule ==
Date	Opponent	Site	Result	Attendance	Source
September 8	at Western Carolina	E. J. Whitmire Stadium; Cullowhee, NC	L 13–45	9,266	
September 15	Guilford*	Richardson Stadium; Davidson, NC	L 12–27	2,100	
September 22	Newberry*	Richardson Stadium; Davidson, NC	L 14–28	1,100	
September 29	at Penn	Franklin Field; Philadelphia, PA	L 14–19	12,309	
October 6	The Citadel^{†}	Richardson Stadium; Davidson, NC	L 14–37	4,000	
October 13	James Madison	Richardson Stadium; Davidson, NC	L 7–28	900	
October 20	Bucknell*	Richardson Stadium; Davidson, NC	L 3–30	800	
October 27	Wofford*	Richardson Stadium; Davidson, NC	W 7–0	2,300	
November 3	at Furman	Paladin Stadium; Greenville, SC	L 7–55	13,133	
November 10	at Catawba*	Shuford Stadium; Salisbury, NC	W 30–15	2,350	
*Non-conference game; ^{†}Homecoming
