= O'Neal Tutein =

American football player and coach (1943–2010)

Biographical details
- Born: February 26, 1943; Brooklyn, New York, U.S.
- Died: October 7, 2010 (aged 67); Lutz, Florida, U.S.

Playing career
- c. 1965: Central State (OH)
- Position: Tight end

Coaching career (HC unless noted)
- 1969–1973: Evander Childs HS (NY) (assistant)
- 1974–1980: Columbia (assistant)
- 1981–1985: Fordham

Head coaching record
- Overall: 20–32

O'Neal Phillip Tutein (February 26, 1943 – October 7, 2010) was an American football coach. He served as the head football coach at Fordham University from 1981 to 1985, 20–32, compiled a record of 20–32.

Tutein attended George W. Wingate High School in Brooklyn, New York and Central State University in Wilberforce, Ohio. He played college football as a tight end at Central State. Tutein was working at the Albert Einstein College of Medicine in 1969 at director of rehabilitation when he began coaching football at the nearby Evander Childs High School. He served as an assistant football coach at Columbia University from 1974 to 1980 under head coaches William Campbell and Bob Naso.

Tutein died in 2010, in Lutz, Florida, where he lived.

== Head coaching record ==
Year	Team	Overall	Conference	Standing	Bowl/playoffs
Fordham Rams (NCAA Division III independent) (1981–1984)
1981	Fordham	5–5			
1982	Fordham	2–8			
1983	Fordham	2–9			
1984	Fordham	5–5			
Fordham Rams (Liberty Football Conference) (1985)
1985	Fordham	6–5	2–3	T–3rd	
Fordham:		20–32	2–3		
Total:		20–32			
