= 1984 Columbia Lions football team =

American college football season

1984 Columbia Lions football
- Conference: Ivy League
- Record: 0–9 (0–7 Ivy)
- Head coach: Bob Naso (5th season)
- Captain: Tony Mazzarini
- Home stadium: Wien Stadium

1984 Ivy League football standings
	Conf.					Overall
Team	W		L		T	W		L		T
Penn $	7	–	0	–	0	8	–	1	–	0
Yale	5	–	2	–	0	6	–	3	–	0
Harvard	5	–	2	–	0	5	–	4	–	0
Brown	4	–	3	–	0	4	–	5	–	0
Princeton	3	–	4	–	0	4	–	5	–	0
Cornell	2	–	5	–	0	2	–	7	–	0
Dartmouth	2	–	5	–	0	2	–	7	–	0
Columbia	0	–	7	–	0	0	–	9	–	0
$ – Conference champion

The 1984 Columbia Lions football team was an American football team that represented Columbia University during the 1984 NCAA Division I-AA football season. Amid a record-setting loss streak, Columbia finished last in the Ivy League.

In their fifth and final season under head coach Bob Naso, the Lions compiled an 0–9 record and were outscored 282 to 117. Tony Mazzarini was the team captain.

The Lions' winless (0–7) conference record was the worst in the Ivy League standings. Columbia was outscored 224 to 87 by Ivy opponents.

By losing all of their games in 1984, the Lions extended a winless streak and a losing streak that began in 1983. The team would later set a Division I record for consecutive games without a win, 44, from 1983 to 1988. Columbia's last win before the streak was October 15, 1983, at Yale; its last tie was November 5, 1983, against Dartmouth. It would not win or tie another game until October 9, 1988, against Princeton. This stretch, which included the entirety of the 1984 to 1987 seasons, included 33 consecutive Ivy League losses. A decade later, Columbia's streak was surpassed by an 80-game loss streak by Prairie View A&M in 1989–1998.

Following a season with seven road games and three "home" games at neutral sites, Columbia in 1984 moved into Lawrence A. Wien Stadium in Upper Manhattan, in New York City, playing six of its nine games at home. The new stadium was built on the same site as the former Baker Field, which hosted Columbia football from 1923 to 1982.

== Schedule ==
Date	Opponent	Site	Result	Attendance	Source
September 22	Harvard	Wien Stadium; New York, NY	L 21–35	10,500	
September 29	Lafayette*	Wien Stadium; New York, NY	L 14–23	4,034	
October 6	at Penn	Franklin Field; Philadelphia, PA	L 7–35	8,469	
October 13	Princeton^{†}	Wien Stadium; New York, NY	L 8–38	9,621	
October 20	at Yale	Yale Bowl; New Haven, CT	L 21–28	13,888	
October 27	No. 15 Colgate*	Wien Stadium; New York, NY	L 16–35	6,617	
November 3	at Dartmouth	Memorial Field; Hanover, NH	L 9–41	5,685	
November 10	Cornell	Wien Stadium; New York, NY (rivalry)	L 7–19	5,996	
November 20	Brown	Wien Stadium; New York, NY	L 14–28	4,635	
*Non-conference game; ^{†}Homecoming; Rankings from the latest NCAA Division I-AA poll released prior to the game
