= 1984 Brown Bears football team =

American college football season

1984 Brown Bears football
- Conference: Ivy League
- Record: 4–5 (4–3 Ivy)
- Head coach: John Rosenberg (1st season)
- Offensive coordinator: Tom Groom (1st season)
- Defensive coordinator: Michael Church (1st season)
- Captains: S. Heffernan; T. Love
- Home stadium: Brown Stadium

1984 Ivy League football standings
	Conf.					Overall
Team	W		L		T	W		L		T
Penn $	7	–	0	–	0	8	–	1	–	0
Yale	5	–	2	–	0	6	–	3	–	0
Harvard	5	–	2	–	0	5	–	4	–	0
Brown	4	–	3	–	0	4	–	5	–	0
Princeton	3	–	4	–	0	4	–	5	–	0
Cornell	2	–	5	–	0	2	–	7	–	0
Dartmouth	2	–	5	–	0	2	–	7	–	0
Columbia	0	–	7	–	0	0	–	9	–	0
$ – Conference champion

The 1984 Brown Bears football team was an American football team that represented Brown University during the 1984 NCAA Division I-AA football season. Brown finished fourth in the Ivy League.

In their first season under head coach John Rosenberg, the Bears compiled a 4–5 record and were outscored 231 to 165. S. Heffernan and T. Love were the team captains.

The Bears' 4–3 conference record placed fourth in the Ivy League standings. They were outscored 156 to 135 by Ivy opponents.

Brown played its home games at Brown Stadium in Providence, Rhode Island.

== Schedule ==
Date	Opponent	Site	Result	Attendance	Source
September 22	Yale	Brown Stadium; Providence, RI	W 27–14	12,781	
September 29	No. T–18 Rhode Island*	Brown Stadium; Providence, RI (rivalry)	L 13–34	12,523	
October 6	at Princeton	Palmer Stadium; Princeton, NJ	W 32–30	11,870	
October 13	Penn	Brown Stadium; Providence, RI	L 14–41	12,614	
October 20	at Cornell	Schoellkopf Field; Ithaca, NY	W 13–9	9,100	
October 27	No. 2 Holy Cross*	Brown Stadium; Providence, RI	L 17–38	12,843	
November 3	at Harvard	Harvard Stadium; Boston, MA	L 10–24	15,000	
November 10	Dartmouth	Brown Stadium; Providence, RI	L 11–27	10,248	
November 17	at Columbia	Wien Stadium; New York, NY	W 28–14	4,635	
*Non-conference game; Rankings from the latest NCAA Division I-AA poll released prior to the game
