= 1984 Cornell Big Red football team =

American college football season

1984 Cornell Big Red football
- Conference: Ivy League
- Record: 2–7 (2–5 Ivy)
- Head coach: Maxie Baughan (2nd season)
- Captains: Steve Garrison; Mark Miller; Scott Sidman; John Tagliaferri
- Home stadium: Schoellkopf Field

1984 Ivy League football standings
	Conf.					Overall
Team	W		L		T	W		L		T
Penn $	7	–	0	–	0	8	–	1	–	0
Yale	5	–	2	–	0	6	–	3	–	0
Harvard	5	–	2	–	0	5	–	4	–	0
Brown	4	–	3	–	0	4	–	5	–	0
Princeton	3	–	4	–	0	4	–	5	–	0
Cornell	2	–	5	–	0	2	–	7	–	0
Dartmouth	2	–	5	–	0	2	–	7	–	0
Columbia	0	–	7	–	0	0	–	9	–	0
$ – Conference champion

The 1984 Cornell Big Red football team was an American football team that represented Cornell University during the 1984 NCAA Division I-AA football season. Cornell tied for second-worst in the Ivy League.

In its second season under head coach Maxie Baughan, the team compiled a 2–7 record and was outscored 161 to 96. Team captains were Steve Garrison, Mark Miller, Scott Sidman and John Tagliaferri.

Cornell's 2–5 conference record tied for sixth place in the Ivy League standings. The Big Red were outscored 116 to 82 by Ivy opponents.

Cornell played its home games at Schoellkopf Field in Ithaca, New York.

== Schedule ==
Date	Opponent	Site	Result	Attendance	Source
September 22	Princeton	Schoellkopf Field; Ithaca, NY	L 9–17	16,300	
September 29	No. 12 Colgate*	Schoellkopf Field; Ithaca, NY (rivalry)	L 7–35	12,100	
October 6	at Bucknell*	Memorial Stadium; Lewisburg, PA	L 7–10	4,200	
October 13	at Harvard	Harvard Stadium; Boston, MA	L 18–24	11,500	
October 20	Brown	Schoellkopf Field; Ithaca, NY	L 9–13	9,100	
October 27	Dartmouth	Schoellkopf Field; Ithaca, NY (rivalry)	W 13–10	16,200	
November 3	at Yale	Yale Bowl; New Haven, CT	L 14–21	16,026	
November 10	at Columbia	Wien Stadium; New York, NY (rivalry)	W 19–7	5,996	
November 17	Penn	Schoellkopf Field; Ithaca, NY (rivalry)	L 0–24	5,800	
*Non-conference game; Rankings from the latest NCAA Division I-AA poll released prior to the game
