= 1984 Appalachian State Mountaineers football team =

American college football season

1984 Appalachian State Mountaineers football
- Conference: Southern Conference
- Record: 4–7 (2–5 SoCon)
- Head coach: Sparky Woods (1st season)
- Defensive coordinator: Ellis Johnson (1st season)
- Home stadium: Conrad Stadium

1984 Southern Conference football standings
	Conf.					Overall
Team	W		L		T	W		L		T
No. 17 Chattanooga $^	5	–	1	–	0	6	–	5	–	0
No. 14 Western Carolina	5	–	2	–	0	8	–	3	–	0
The Citadel	4	–	2	–	0	7	–	4	–	0
No. 16 Furman	3	–	3	–	0	8	–	3	–	0
East Tennessee State	2	–	4	–	0	6	–	5	–	0
Marshall	2	–	4	–	0	6	–	5	–	0
Appalachian State	2	–	5	–	0	4	–	7	–	0
VMI	1	–	4	–	0	1	–	9	–	0
Davidson	0	–	2	–	0	2	–	8	–	0
$ – Conference champion; ^ – NCAA Division I-AA playoff participant; Rankings from NCAA Division I-AA Football Committee poll

The 1984 Appalachian State Mountaineers football team was an American football team that represented Appalachian State University as a member of the Southern Conference (SoCon) during the 1984 NCAA Division I-AA football season. In their first year under head coach Sparky Woods, the Mountaineers compiled an overall record of 4–7 with a mark of 2–5 in conference play, placing seventh in the SoCon.

== Schedule ==
Date	Opponent	Site	Result	Attendance	Source
September 1	at No. 4 (I-A) Clemson*	Memorial Stadium; Clemson, SC	L 7–40	75,398	
September 8	at Western Kentucky*	L. T. Smith Stadium; Bowling Green, KY	W 17–16	14,000	
September 15	at Wake Forest*	Groves Stadium; Winston-Salem, NC	L 13–17	22,700	
September 22	East Tennessee State	Conrad Stadium; Boone, NC	W 14–0	14,120	
September 29	at VMI	Alumni Memorial Field; Lexington, VA	L 16–20	5,400	
October 6	Western Carolina	Conrad Stadium; Boone, NC (rivalry)	L 7–34	18,629	
October 13	at Marshall	Fairfield Stadium; Huntington, WV (rivalry)	L 7–35	14,529	
October 20	No. 6 Furman	Conrad Stadium; Boone, NC	W 21–14	17,285	
October 27	The Citadel	Conrad Stadium; Boone, NC	L 5–21	9,852	
November 10	at Chattanooga	Chamberlain Field; Chattanooga, TN	L 20–21	3,620	
November 17	South Carolina State*	Conrad Stadium; Boone, NC	W 24–0	8,142	
*Non-conference game; Rankings from NCAA Division I-AA Football Committee Poll released prior to the game
