= John Rosenberg (American football) =

American football player and coach

Biographical details
- Born: 1947 or 1948

Playing career
- 1963–1967: Harvard
- Position: Linebacker

Coaching career (HC unless noted)
- 1972–1973: Villanova (DC)
- 1974–1982: Penn State (assistant)
- 1983: Philadelphia Stars (DB)
- 1984–1989: Brown
- 1994: Los Angeles Valley (DC)
- 1997: Cal State Northridge (DC)

Head coaching record
- Overall: 23–33–3

John David Rosenberg (born 1947 or 1948) is an American former football coach. His coaching career has spanned over 30 years at a variety of levels, including collegiate and professional teams in the United States, and pro club teams in the Italian Football League and German Football League in Europe. Most notably, he served as head football coach at Brown University from 1984 to 1989, compiling a record of 23–33–3. Rosenberg is credited by some as the creator of the zone blitz defense made popular by the Pittsburgh Steelers. His career has included national championships in three countries.

== United States ==
=== Penn State ===
Rosenberg was an assistant coach at Penn State for 11 seasons, working for head coach Joe Paterno. During this time he coached in 11 bowl games, including the National Championship team in 1982. He coordinated recruiting from 1974 to 1977, and also served as defensive backfield coach from 1977 to 1982.

=== Philadelphia ===
In 1983, he was an assistant coach with the Philadelphia Stars in the first year of the United States Football League (USFL). Jim Mora Sr. was head coach and Carl Peterson, former president of the Kansas City Chiefs, was the general manager.

=== Brown University ===
Rosenberg was the head coach at Brown University in the Ivy League from 1984 to 1989. He led the Bears to three consecutive winning seasons, including a 7–3 mark in 1987. He resigned in 1990 following a 2–8 season in 1989 and a season with no victories in 1988. School officials acknowledged that calls from alumni for his dismissal had been growing. He had a 23–33–3 record in his six seasons at Brown.

== Germany ==
=== Munich ===
In 1994, he went to Europe for the first time as head coach of the Munich Thunder of the Football League of Europe (FLE), which disbanded after one season. In 1995, he was head coach of the Berlin Adler in the German Football League (GFL). He also was the defensive coordinator of the Cologne Crocodiles from 1998 to 1999 and the Munich Cowboys from 2000 to 2001. He was the head coach for the Cowboys from 2007 from 2009. In 2010, he was head coach of the Plattling Black Hawks.

=== Hamburg ===
In 2002, he was head coach of the Hamburg Blue Devils in the GFL, winning the German Bowl for the German National Championship. In 2004, he coordinated the defense of the Braunschweig Lions, Germany's most winning team with many German Bowl appearances and ten National Championships.

== Italy ==
In 2005, he became the head coach of the Bergamo Lions, one of Europe's most successful teams. Bergamo had won the Italian League Championship for 10 straight years and won the Eurobowl (equivalent to European soccer's Champions League) in American Football in 2000, 2001, and 2002. He won the Italian Football League title in 2005 and lost the Eurobowl championship game to the Vienna Vikings from the Austrian Football League, finishing with a 13–1 record.

== Personal ==
Rosenberg received a bachelor's degree from Harvard University, where he studied social psychology and organizational behavior. He received a master's degree in counselor education from Penn State in 1972.

Rosenberg grew up in Newton, Massachusetts. He now lives in Los Angeles, California where he has done some writing and editing for films and television projects with football themes. He also was a sports radio talk show host in the early 1990s.

He holds a U.S. Patent for a board game he created in the late 1970s.

== Head coaching record ==
| Year | Team | Overall | Conference | Standing | Bowl/playoffs |
|---|---|---|---|---|---|
Brown Bears (Ivy League) (1984–1989)
| 1984 | Brown | 4–5 | 4–3 | 4th | |
| 1985 | Brown | 5–4–1 | 4–3 | 4th | |
| 1986 | Brown | 5–4–1 | 4–2–1 | 3rd | |
| 1987 | Brown | 7–3 | 5–2 | T–2nd | |
| 1988 | Brown | 0–9–1 | 0–6–1 | 8th | |
| 1989 | Brown | 2–8 | 2–5 | T–5th | |
| Brown: | | 23–33–3 | 19–21–2 | | |
| Total: | | 23–33–3 | | | |
