= 1984 Bucknell Bison football team =

American college football season

1984 Bucknell Bison football
- Conference: Independent
- Record: 5–5
- Head coach: Bob Curtis (10th season)
- Captains: Bob Gibbon; Keith Jansen; Scott Somerville
- Home stadium: Memorial Stadium

1984 NCAA Division I-AA independents football standings
	Conf.			Overall
Team	W	L	T	W		L		T
Tennessee State		–		11	–	0	–	0
Eastern Washington		–		7	–	2	–	1
Georgia Southern		–		8	–	3	–	0
No. 15 Holy Cross		–		8	–	3	–	0
No. 19 Delaware		–		8	–	3	–	0
No. 12 Richmond ^		–		8	–	4	–	0
James Madison		–		6	–	5	–	0
William & Mary		–		6	–	5	–	0
Bucknell		–		5	–	5	–	0
Colgate		–		5	–	5	–	0
Lafayette		–		5	–	5	–	0
Lehigh		–		5	–	6	–	0
Florida A&M		–		3	–	6	–	1
Northeastern		–		3	–	7	–	0
Western Kentucky		–		2	–	9	–	0
^ – NCAA Division I-AA playoff participant; Rankings from NCAA Division I-AA Football Committee poll

The 1984 Bucknell Bison football team was an American football team that represented Bucknell University as an independent during the 1984 NCAA Division I-AA football season.

In their tenth year under head coach Bob Curtis, the Bison compiled a 5–5 record. Bob Gibbon, Keith Jansen and Scott Somerville were the team captains.

Bucknell played its home games at Memorial Stadium on the university campus in Lewisburg, Pennsylvania.

== Schedule ==
Date	Opponent	Site	Result	Attendance	Source
September 8	IUP	Memorial Stadium; Lewisburg, PA	W 18–17		
September 15	Carnegie Mellon	Memorial Stadium; Lewisburg, PA	W 42–7	2,400	
September 22	at Northeastern*	Parsons Field; Brookline, MA	L 33–34		
September 29	at Princeton	Palmer Stadium; Princeton, NJ	L 14–20	11,150	
October 6	Cornell	Memorial Stadium; Lewisburg, PA	W 10–7	4,200	
October 13	at No. 18 New Hampshire*	Cowell Stadium; Durham, NH	L 16–17	15,230	
October 20	at Davidson	Richardson Stadium; Davidson, NC	W 30–3	800	
November 3	Lafayette^{†}	Memorial Stadium; Lewisburg, PA	W 10–3	7,600	
November 10	at Lehigh	Taylor Stadium; Bethlehem, PA	L 15–21	9,500	
November 17	at Delaware	Delaware Stadium; Newark, DE	L 9–28	15,088	
*Non-conference game; ^{†}Homecoming; ^ Parents Weekend; Rankings from NCAA Division I-AA Football Committee Poll released prior to the game
