= 1984 Eastern Washington Eagles football team =

American college football season

1984 Eastern Washington Eagles football
- Conference: Independent
- Record: 7–2–1
- Head coach: Dick Zornes (6th season)
- Home stadium: Joe Albi Stadium

1984 NCAA Division I-AA independents football standings
	Conf.			Overall
Team	W	L	T	W		L		T
Tennessee State		–		11	–	0	–	0
Eastern Washington		–		7	–	2	–	1
Georgia Southern		–		8	–	3	–	0
No. 15 Holy Cross		–		8	–	3	–	0
No. 19 Delaware		–		8	–	3	–	0
No. 12 Richmond ^		–		8	–	4	–	0
James Madison		–		6	–	5	–	0
William & Mary		–		6	–	5	–	0
Bucknell		–		5	–	5	–	0
Colgate		–		5	–	5	–	0
Lafayette		–		5	–	5	–	0
Lehigh		–		5	–	6	–	0
Florida A&M		–		3	–	6	–	1
Northeastern		–		3	–	7	–	0
Western Kentucky		–		2	–	9	–	0
^ – NCAA Division I-AA playoff participant; Rankings from NCAA Division I-AA Football Committee poll

The 1984 Eastern Washington Eagles football team was an American football team that represented Eastern Washington University as an independent during the 1984 NCAA Division I-AA football season. Led by sixth-year head coach Dick Zornes, the team compiled a 7–2–1 record.

== Schedule ==
Date	Opponent	Site	Result	Attendance	Source
September 8	Central Washington	Joe Albi Stadium; Spokane, WA	W 38–20	2,000	
September 15	Montana State	Joe Albi Stadium; Spokane, WA	W 21–16		
September 22	Angelo State	Joe Albi Stadium; Spokane, WA	W 40–7	1,892	
September 29	at Boise State	Bronco Stadium; Boise, ID	L 17–45	17,145	
October 6	Howard Payne	Joe Albi Stadium; Spokane, WA	W 32–0	1,561	
October 13	at Montana	Dornblaser Field; Missoula, MT (rivalry)	T 14–14	5,500	
October 20	Idaho	Joe Albi Stadium; Spokane, WA	W 32–25	10,213	
October 27	at Idaho State	ASISU Minidome; Pocatello, ID	W 41–23		
November 3	at Nevada	Mackay Stadium; Reno, NV	L 21–35	8,222	
November 10	at Northern Colorado	Jackson Field; Greeley, CO	W 50–15		
