= 1984 James Madison Dukes football team =

American college football season

1984 James Madison Dukes football
- Conference: Independent
- Record: 6–5
- Head coach: Challace McMillin (13th season)
- Home stadium: Madison Stadium

1984 NCAA Division I-AA independents football standings
	Conf.			Overall
Team	W	L	T	W		L		T
Tennessee State		–		11	–	0	–	0
Eastern Washington		–		7	–	2	–	1
Georgia Southern		–		8	–	3	–	0
No. 15 Holy Cross		–		8	–	3	–	0
No. 19 Delaware		–		8	–	3	–	0
No. 12 Richmond ^		–		8	–	4	–	0
James Madison		–		6	–	5	–	0
William & Mary		–		6	–	5	–	0
Bucknell		–		5	–	5	–	0
Colgate		–		5	–	5	–	0
Lafayette		–		5	–	5	–	0
Lehigh		–		5	–	6	–	0
Florida A&M		–		3	–	6	–	1
Northeastern		–		3	–	7	–	0
Western Kentucky		–		2	–	9	–	0
^ – NCAA Division I-AA playoff participant; Rankings from NCAA Division I-AA Football Committee poll

The 1984 James Madison Dukes football team was an American football team that represented James Madison University during the 1984 NCAA Division I-AA football season as an independent. In their thirteenth year under head coach Challace McMillin, the team compiled an 6–5 record.

== Schedule ==
Date	Opponent	Site	Result	Attendance	Source
September 1	Richmond	JMU Stadium; Harrisonburg, VA (rivalry)	L 12–43	11,800	
September 8	at Delaware	Delaware Stadium; Newark, DE (rivalry)	L 3–32	16,419	
September 15	at Morehead State	Jayne Stadium; Morehead, KY	W 38–28	6,500	
September 22	at Liberty	City Stadium; Lynchburg, VA	W 52–43	4,921	
September 29	William & Mary	JMU Stadium; Harrisonburg, VA (rivalry)	L 10–20	8,300	
October 6	No. 20 Delaware State	JMU Stadium; Harrisonburg, VA	W 20–19		
October 13	at Davidson	Richardson Stadium; Davidson, NC	W 28–7	900	
October 20	Northeastern	JMU Stadium; Harrisonburg, VA	L 6–9	13,900	
October 27	East Tennessee State	JMU Stadium; Harrisonburg, VA	L 6–9	17,000	
November 10	VMI	JMU Stadium; Harrisonburg, VA	W 21–17		
November 17	at Towson State	Minnegan Stadium; Towson, MD	W 24–14	3,350	
Rankings from NCAA Division I-AA Football Committee Poll released prior to the game
