= 1984 Yale Bulldogs football team =

American college football season

1984 Yale Bulldogs football
- Conference: Ivy League
- Record: 6–3 (5–2 Ivy)
- Head coach: Carmen Cozza (20th season)
- Home stadium: Yale Bowl

1984 Ivy League football standings
	Conf.					Overall
Team	W		L		T	W		L		T
Penn $	7	–	0	–	0	8	–	1	–	0
Yale	5	–	2	–	0	6	–	3	–	0
Harvard	5	–	2	–	0	5	–	4	–	0
Brown	4	–	3	–	0	4	–	5	–	0
Princeton	3	–	4	–	0	4	–	5	–	0
Cornell	2	–	5	–	0	2	–	7	–	0
Dartmouth	2	–	5	–	0	2	–	7	–	0
Columbia	0	–	7	–	0	0	–	9	–	0
$ – Conference champion

The 1984 Yale Bulldogs football team represented Yale University in the 1984 NCAA Division I-AA football season. The Bulldogs were led by 20th-year head coach Carmen Cozza, played their home games at the Yale Bowl and finished in second place in the Ivy League with a 5–2 record, 6–3 overall.

== Schedule ==
Date	Opponent	Site	Result	Attendance	Source
September 22	at Brown	Brown Stadium; Providence, RI	L 14–27	12,781	
September 29	Connecticut*	Yale Bowl; New Haven, CT	L 0–20	32,318	
October 6	Morgan State*	Yale Bowl; New Haven, CT	W 41–0	14,420	
October 13	Dartmouth	Yale Bowl; New Haven, CT	W 28–18	25,372	
October 20	Columbia	Yale Bowl; New Haven, CT	W 28–21	13,888	
October 27	at Penn	Franklin Field; Philadelphia, PA	L 21–34	36,975	
November 3	Cornell	Yale Bowl; New Haven, CT	W 21–14	16,026	
November 10	Princeton	Yale Bowl; New Haven, CT (rivalry)	W 27–24	26,121	
November 17	at Harvard	Harvard Stadium; Boston, MA (The Game)	W 30–27	40,000	
*Non-conference game

== Roster ==
1984 Yale Bulldogs football team roster
Players
Coaches
Offense

Pos.	#	Name	Class
QB	7	Mike Curtin	Jr
OT	71	Paul Wimer	Sr
QB	11	Mike Cyr	Sr
WR	82	Kevin Moriarty	Jr

Defense

Pos.	#	Name	Class
DE	85	Jim Quinn	Jr
LB	16	John Quinn	Jr

Special teams

Pos.	#	Name	Class

Head coach

- Carmen Cozza

Coordinators/assistant coaches

Legend

- (C) Team captain
- (S) Suspended
- (I) Ineligible
- Injured
- Redshirt
