= 1984 The Citadel Bulldogs football team =

American college football season

1984 The Citadel Bulldogs football
- Conference: Southern Conference
- Record: 7–4 (5–2 SoCon)
- Head coach: Tom Moore (2nd season)
- Home stadium: Johnson Hagood Stadium

1984 Southern Conference football standings
	Conf.					Overall
Team	W		L		T	W		L		T
No. 17 Chattanooga $^	5	–	1	–	0	6	–	5	–	0
No. 14 Western Carolina	5	–	2	–	0	8	–	3	–	0
The Citadel	4	–	2	–	0	7	–	4	–	0
No. 16 Furman	3	–	3	–	0	8	–	3	–	0
East Tennessee State	2	–	4	–	0	6	–	5	–	0
Marshall	2	–	4	–	0	6	–	5	–	0
Appalachian State	2	–	5	–	0	4	–	7	–	0
VMI	1	–	4	–	0	1	–	9	–	0
Davidson	0	–	2	–	0	2	–	8	–	0
$ – Conference champion; ^ – NCAA Division I-AA playoff participant; Rankings from NCAA Division I-AA Football Committee poll

The 1984 The Citadel Bulldogs football team represented The Citadel, The Military College of South Carolina in the 1984 NCAA Division I-AA football season. Tom Moore served as head coach for the second season. The Bulldogs played as members of the Southern Conference and played home games at Johnson Hagood Stadium.

== Schedule ==
Date	Opponent	Rank	Site	Result	Attendance	Source
September 8	at South Carolina*		Williams–Brice Stadium; Columbia, SC	L 24–31	71,200	
September 15	Presbyterian*		Johnson Hagood Stadium; Charleston, SC	W 23–6	17,550	
September 22	at Georgia Tech*		Grant Field; Atlanta, GA	L 3–48	31,684	
September 29	East Tennessee State		Johnson Hagood Stadium; Charleston, SC	L 6–16	11,460	
October 6	at Davidson		Richardson Stadium; Davidson, NC	W 37–14	4,000	
October 13	at No. 19 Western Carolina		E. J. Whitmire Stadium; Cullowhee, NC	W 34–33	12,204	
October 20	Marshall		Johnson Hagood Stadium; Charleston, SC	W 28–14	17,150	
October 27	at Appalachian State		Conrad Stadium; Boone, NC	W 21–5	9,852	
November 3	VMI^{†}	No. T–19	Johnson Hagood Stadium; Charleston, SC (Military Classic of the South)	W 27–24	18,550	
November 10	Wofford*	No. 15	Johnson Hagood Stadium; Charleston, SC (rivalry)	W 23–16	10,340	
November 17	at Furman	No. 15	Paladin Stadium; Greenville, SC (rivalry)	L 14–42	12,408	
*Non-conference game; ^{†}Homecoming; Rankings from NCAA Division I-AA Football Committee Poll released prior to the game
