= 1984 Colgate Red Raiders football team =

American college football season

1984 Colgate Red Raiders football
- Conference: Independent
- Record: 5–5
- Head coach: Frederick Dunlap (9th season)
- Captains: Bob Clark; John McCabe
- Home stadium: Andy Kerr Stadium

1984 NCAA Division I-AA independents football standings
	Conf.			Overall
Team	W	L	T	W		L		T
Tennessee State		–		11	–	0	–	0
Eastern Washington		–		7	–	2	–	1
Georgia Southern		–		8	–	3	–	0
No. 15 Holy Cross		–		8	–	3	–	0
No. 19 Delaware		–		8	–	3	–	0
No. 12 Richmond ^		–		8	–	4	–	0
James Madison		–		6	–	5	–	0
William & Mary		–		6	–	5	–	0
Bucknell		–		5	–	5	–	0
Colgate		–		5	–	5	–	0
Lafayette		–		5	–	5	–	0
Lehigh		–		5	–	6	–	0
Florida A&M		–		3	–	6	–	1
Northeastern		–		3	–	7	–	0
Western Kentucky		–		2	–	9	–	0
^ – NCAA Division I-AA playoff participant; Rankings from NCAA Division I-AA Football Committee poll

The 1984 Colgate Red Raiders football team was an American football team that represented Colgate University as an independent during the 1984 NCAA Division I-AA football season.

In its ninth season under head coach Frederick Dunlap, the team compiled a 5–5 record. John McCabe and Bob Clark were the team captains.

The Red Raiders won their first three games against Division I-AA opponents and became a constant presence in the weekly national rankings, reaching as high as No. 10 in the poll released October 2 (a Colgate bye week). A streak of three losses at the end of the year, however, dropped them out of the rankings and resulted in a .500 season record.

The team played its home games at Andy Kerr Stadium in Hamilton, New York.

== Schedule ==
Date	Opponent	Rank	Site	Result	Attendance	Source
September 8	Connecticut		Andy Kerr Stadium; Hamilton, NY	W 9–3	6,500	
September 15	at Army		Michie Stadium; West Point, NY	L 15–41	32,032	
September 22	at No. 15 Lehigh		Taylor Stadium; Bethlehem, PA	W 40–35	12,500	
September 29	at Cornell	No. 12	Schoellkopf Field; Ithaca, NY (rivalry)	W 35–7	12,100	
October 13	No. 2 Holy Cross	No. 12	Andy Kerr Stadium; Hamilton, NY	L 27–42	9,500	
October 20	Lafayette	No. 20	Andy Kerr Stadium; Hamilton, NY	W 41–20	6,500	
October 27	at Columbia	No. 15	Wien Stadium; New York, NY	W 35–16	6,617	
November 3	at Richmond	No. 11	City Stadium; Richmond, VA	L 24–55	10,726	
November 10	William & Mary		Andy Kerr Stadium; Hamilton, NY	L 39–48	3,500	
November 17	at Rutgers		Rutgers Stadium; Piscataway, NJ	L 7–17	22,217	
Rankings from NCAA Division I-AA Football Committee Poll released prior to the game
