= 1984 East Tennessee State Buccaneers football team =

American college football season

1984 East Tennessee State Buccaneers football
- Conference: Southern Conference
- Record: 6–5 (2–4 SoCon)
- Head coach: Buddy Sasser (2nd season)
- Defensive coordinator: Mike Ayers (2nd season)
- Home stadium: Memorial Center

1984 Southern Conference football standings
	Conf.					Overall
Team	W		L		T	W		L		T
No. 17 Chattanooga $^	5	–	1	–	0	6	–	5	–	0
No. 14 Western Carolina	5	–	2	–	0	8	–	3	–	0
The Citadel	4	–	2	–	0	7	–	4	–	0
No. 16 Furman	3	–	3	–	0	8	–	3	–	0
East Tennessee State	2	–	4	–	0	6	–	5	–	0
Marshall	2	–	4	–	0	6	–	5	–	0
Appalachian State	2	–	5	–	0	4	–	7	–	0
VMI	1	–	4	–	0	1	–	9	–	0
Davidson	0	–	2	–	0	2	–	8	–	0
$ – Conference champion; ^ – NCAA Division I-AA playoff participant; Rankings from NCAA Division I-AA Football Committee poll

The 1984 East Tennessee State Buccaneers football team was an American football team that represented East Tennessee State University as a member of the Southern Conference (SoCon) during the 1984 NCAA Division I-AA football season. Led by second-year head coach Buddy Sasser, the Buccaneers compiled and overall record of 6–5, with a mark of 2–5 in conference play, and finished tied for fifth in the SoCon.

== Schedule ==
Date	Opponent	Rank	Site	Result	Attendance	Source
September 8	at Tennessee Tech*		Tucker Stadium; Cookeville, TN	W 10–3		
September 15	Eastern Kentucky*		Memorial Center; Johnson City, TN	W 10–7	9,072	
September 22	at Appalachian State		Conrad Stadium; Boone, NC	L 0–14	14,120	
September 29	at The Citadel		Johnson Hagood Stadium; Charleston, SC	W 16–6	11,460	
October 6	at No. 8 Chattanooga		Chamberlain Field; Chattanooga, TN	W 12–0	9,103	
October 13	No. 6 Furman	No. 13	Memorial Center; Johnson City, TN	L 16–28		
October 20	at East Carolina*	No. 19	Ficklen Memorial Stadium; Greenville, NC	L 6–24	27,119	
October 27	at James Madison*		JMU Stadium; Harrisonburg, VA	W 9–6	17,000	
November 3	No. 7 Georgia Southern*		Memorial Center; Johnson City, TN	W 20–17	10,112	
November 10	No. 18 Western Carolina		Memorial Center; Johnson City, TN	L 17–31		
November 17	Marshall		Memorial Center; Johnson City, TN	L 28–31	6,102	
*Non-conference game; Rankings from NCAA Division I-AA Football Committee Poll released prior to the game
