= 1984 Howard Bison football team =

American college football season

1984 Howard Bison football
- Conference: Mid-Eastern Athletic Conference
- Record: 2–8 (0–4 MEAC)
- Head coach: Willie Jeffries (1st season)
- Home stadium: Howard Stadium; RFK Stadium

1984 Mid-Eastern Athletic Conference football standings
	Conf.					Overall
Team	W		L		T	W		L		T
Bethune–Cookman $	4	–	0	–	0	7	–	3	–	0
Delaware State	3	–	1	–	0	8	–	2	–	0
South Carolina State	2	–	2	–	0	4	–	6	–	1
North Carolina A&T	1	–	3	–	0	2	–	8	–	0
Howard	0	–	4	–	0	2	–	8	–	0
Morgan State	0	–	0	–	0	0	–	11	–	0
$ – Conference champion; Morgan State games did not count as conference games. Morgan State was NCAA Division II. All the other teams were classified as I-AA.

The 1984 Howard Bison football team represented Howard University as a member of the Mid-Eastern Athletic Conference (MEAC) during the 1984 NCAA Division I-AA football season. Led by first-year head coach Willie Jeffries, the Bison compiled an overall record of 2–8, with a mark of 0–4 in conference play, and finished fifth in the MEAC.

== Schedule ==
Date	Opponent	Site	Result	Attendance	Source
September 1	at Rhode Island*	Meade Stadium; Kingston, RI	L 21–31	3,520	
September 8	Hampton*	Howard Stadium; Washington, DC (rivalry)	L 7–13	8,500	
September 15	Bethune–Cookman	Howard Stadium; Washington, DC	L 6–19		
September 22	at South Carolina State	State College Stadium; Orangeburg, SC	L 15–48	8,327	
October 13	at Virginia State*	Rogers Stadium; Ettrick, VA	W 22–21		
October 22	North Carolina A&T^{†}	RFK Stadium; Washington, DC	L 7–23	10,500	
October 27	at Norfolk State*	Foreman Field; Norfolk, VA	L 10–42		
November 3	Delaware State	Howard Stadium; Washington, DC	L 7–45		
November 10	Maine*	Howard Stadium; Washington, DC	L 23–27		
November 17	Morgan State*	Howard Stadium; Washington, DC (rivalry)	W 47–13	2,800	
*Non-conference game; ^{†}Homecoming
