= Bob Naso =

American football player and coach (born 1937)

Biographical details
- Born: September 11, 1937 (age 89)

Playing career
- 1956–1958: Rutgers

Coaching career (HC unless noted)
- 1961–1967: Rutgers (DL)
- 1968–1979: Rutgers (DC)
- 1980–1984: Columbia

Head coaching record
- Overall: 4–43–2

Robert James Naso (born September 11, 1937) is an American former college football coach. From 1961 to 1967 he was defensive line coach at Rutgers, then was defensive coordinator from 1968 to 1979. In 1976, while Naso worked as defensive coordinator, the Scarlet Knights went 11–0 and his unit placed first nationwide in total, rushing and scoring defense. After spending two decades with his alma mater, where he also played football and lacrosse, Naso moved on to become the head football coach at Columbia University. He was fired after five seasons during which time his teams compiled a 4–43–2 record, including a 1984 season that was Columbia's first winless season since 1943.

Naso has been inducted into the Rutgers University, Long Island Metropolitan Lacrosse, and New Jersey Lacrosse Halls of Fame.

== Head coaching record ==
Year	Team	Overall	Conference	Standing	Bowl/playoffs
Columbia Lions (Ivy League) (1980–1984)
1980	Columbia	1–9	0–7	8th	
1981	Columbia	1–9	1–6	7th	
1982	Columbia	1–9	1–6	8th	
1983	Columbia	1–7–2	1–5–1	7th	
1984	Columbia	0–9	0–7	8th	
Columbia:		4–43–2	3–31–1		
Total:		4–43–2			
