= 1984 Furman Paladins football team =

American college football season

1984 Furman Paladins football
- Conference: Southern Conference
- Record: 8–3 (3–3 SoCon)
- Head coach: Dick Sheridan (7th season)
- Captains: Rock Hurst; Chas Fox; Bernard Durham
- Home stadium: Paladin Stadium

1984 Southern Conference football standings
	Conf.					Overall
Team	W		L		T	W		L		T
No. 17 Chattanooga $^	5	–	1	–	0	6	–	5	–	0
No. 14 Western Carolina	5	–	2	–	0	8	–	3	–	0
The Citadel	4	–	2	–	0	7	–	4	–	0
No. 16 Furman	3	–	3	–	0	8	–	3	–	0
East Tennessee State	2	–	4	–	0	6	–	5	–	0
Marshall	2	–	4	–	0	6	–	5	–	0
Appalachian State	2	–	5	–	0	4	–	7	–	0
VMI	1	–	4	–	0	1	–	9	–	0
Davidson	0	–	2	–	0	2	–	8	–	0
$ – Conference champion; ^ – NCAA Division I-AA playoff participant; Rankings from NCAA Division I-AA Football Committee poll

The 1984 Furman Paladins football team was an American football team that represented Furman University as a member of the Southern Conference (SoCon) during the 1984 NCAA Division I-AA football season. In their seventh year under head coach Dick Sheridan, the Paladins compiled an overall record of 8–3 with a conference mark of 3–3, placing fourth in the SoCon.

== Schedule ==
Date	Opponent	Rank	Site	Result	Attendance	Source
September 1	South Carolina State*		Paladin Stadium; Greenville, SC	W 28–10	12,766	
September 8	Newberry*		Paladin Stadium; Greenville, SC	W 49–7		
September 15	at NC State*		Carter–Finley Stadium; Raleigh, NC	W 34–30	37,200	
September 22	at Marshall	No. 1	Fairfield Stadium; Huntington, WV	W 38–28	18,065	
September 29	at No. 20 Chattanooga	No. 1	Chamberlain Field; Chattanooga, TN	L 14–21	10,038	
October 13	at No. 13 East Tennessee State	No. 6	Memorial Center; Johnson City, TN	W 28–16		
October 20	at Appalachian State	No. 6	Conrad Stadium; Boone, NC	L 14–21	17,285	
October 27	Western Carolina	No. 12	Paladin Stadium; Greenville, SC	L 19–20	12,514	
November 3	Davidson		Paladin Stadium; Greenville, SC	W 55–7	13,133	
November 10	UCF*		Paladin Stadium; Greenville, SC	W 42–6	10,162	
November 17	No. 15 The Citadel		Paladin Stadium; Greenville, SC (rivalry)	W 42–14	12,408	
*Non-conference game; Rankings from NCAA Division I-AA Football Committee Poll released prior to the game
