= 1984 Bethune–Cookman Wildcats football team =

American college football season

1984 Bethune–Cookman Wildcats football

MEAC champion
- Conference: Mid-Eastern Athletic Conference
- Record: 7–3 (4–0 MEAC)
- Head coach: Larry Little (2nd season)
- Offensive coordinator: Rick Stockstill (2nd season)
- Home stadium: Memorial Stadium

1984 Mid-Eastern Athletic Conference football standings
	Conf.					Overall
Team	W		L		T	W		L		T
Bethune–Cookman $	4	–	0	–	0	7	–	3	–	0
Delaware State	3	–	1	–	0	8	–	2	–	0
South Carolina State	2	–	2	–	0	4	–	6	–	1
North Carolina A&T	1	–	3	–	0	2	–	8	–	0
Howard	0	–	4	–	0	2	–	8	–	0
Morgan State	0	–	0	–	0	0	–	11	–	0
$ – Conference champion; Morgan State games did not count as conference games. Morgan State was NCAA Division II. All the other teams were classified as I-AA.

The 1984 Bethune–Cookman Wildcats football team represented Bethune–Cookman College (now known as Bethune–Cookman University) as a member of the Mid-Eastern Athletic Conference (MEAC) during the 1984 NCAA Division I-AA football season. Led by second-year head coach Larry Little, the Wildcats compiled an overall record of 7–3, with a mark of 4–0 in conference play, and finished as MEAC champion.

== Schedule ==
Date	Opponent	Rank	Site	Result	Attendance	Source
September 1	at UCF*		Florida Citrus Bowl; Orlando, FL	W 43–22	7,421	
September 15	at Howard		Howard Stadium; Washington, D.C.	W 19–6		
September 22	at Grambling State*		Eddie G. Robinson Memorial Stadium; Grambling, LA	L 17–35		
September 29	No. 7 Delaware State		Memorial Stadium; Daytona Beach, FL	W 41–38		
October 6	vs. Georgia Southern*	No. 18	Gator Bowl; Jacksonville, FL	L 33–43	4,700	
October 13	at Alabama State*		Cramton Bowl; Montgomery, AL	W 31–24		
October 20	vs. South Carolina State		Florida Citrus Bowl; Orlando, FL	W 24–23	9,700	
October 27	at North Carolina A&T		Aggie Stadium; Greensboro, NC	W 23–15		
November 3	vs. No. 3 Tennessee State*		Tampa Stadium; Tampa, FL	L 8–41	9,200	
November 10	Morris Brown*^{†}		Memorial Stadium; Daytona Beach, FL	W 42–28	10,200	
*Non-conference game; ^{†}Homecoming; Rankings from NCAA Division I-AA Football Committee Poll released prior to the game
