= 1984 Richmond Spiders football team =

American college football season

1984 Richmond Spiders football

NCAA Division I-AA Quarterfinal, L 17–23 at Rhode Island
- Conference: Independent
- Record: 8–4
- Head coach: Dal Shealy (5th season)
- Offensive coordinator: Jim Marshall (6th season)
- Home stadium: UR Stadium

1984 NCAA Division I-AA independents football standings
	Conf.			Overall
Team	W	L	T	W		L		T
Tennessee State		–		11	–	0	–	0
Eastern Washington		–		7	–	2	–	1
Georgia Southern		–		8	–	3	–	0
No. 15 Holy Cross		–		8	–	3	–	0
No. 19 Delaware		–		8	–	3	–	0
No. 12 Richmond ^		–		8	–	4	–	0
James Madison		–		6	–	5	–	0
William & Mary		–		6	–	5	–	0
Bucknell		–		5	–	5	–	0
Colgate		–		5	–	5	–	0
Lafayette		–		5	–	5	–	0
Lehigh		–		5	–	6	–	0
Florida A&M		–		3	–	6	–	1
Northeastern		–		3	–	7	–	0
Western Kentucky		–		2	–	9	–	0
^ – NCAA Division I-AA playoff participant; Rankings from NCAA Division I-AA Football Committee poll

The 1984 Richmond Spiders football team was an American football team that represented the University of Richmond as an independent during the 1984 NCAA Division I-AA football season. In their fifth season under head coach Dal Shealy, Richmond compiled an 8–4 record. In the I-AA playoffs, the Spiders defeated Boston University in the first round but lost to Rhode Island in the quarterfinals.

== Schedule ==
Date	Opponent	Rank	Site	Result	Attendance	Source
September 1	at James Madison		JMU Stadium; Harrisonburg, VA (rivalry)	W 43–12	11,800	
September 8	at Bowling Green		Doyt Perry Stadium; Bowling Green, OH	L 28–55	14,023	
September 15	Maine		UR Stadium; Richmond, VA	W 30–13		
September 22	at Virginia Tech		Lane Stadium; Blacksburg, VA	L 13–21	36,200	
October 6	Wake Forest		UR Stadium; Richmond, VA	L 16–29	15,126	
October 13	at UMass		Alumni Stadium; Hadley, MA	W 24–7	8,229	
October 27	VMI		UR Stadium; Richmond, VA (rivalry)	W 45–3	15,726	
November 3	No. 11 Colgate		UR Stadium; Richmond, VA	W 55–24	10,726	
November 10	at Northeastern	No. 19	Parsons Field; Brookline, MA	W 19–8	3,100	
November 17	No. 18 William & Mary	No. 13	UR Stadium; Richmond, VA (rivalry)	W 33–31	21,484	
November 24	No. 4 Boston University	No. 12	UR Stadium; Richmond, VA (NCAA Division I-AA First Round)	W 35–33		
December 1	at No. 3 Rhode Island	No. 12	Meade Stadium; Kingston, RI (NCAA Division I-AA Quarterfinals)	L 17–23	10,446	
Rankings from NCAA Division I-AA Football Committee Poll released prior to the game
