= 1984 Holy Cross Crusaders football team =

American college football season

1984 Holy Cross Crusaders football
- Conference: Independent
- Record: 8–3
- Head coach: Rick E. Carter (4th season)
- Offensive coordinator: George DeLeone (1st season)
- Defensive coordinator: Mark Duffner (4th season)
- Captains: Bill McGovern; Peter Muldoon
- Home stadium: Fitton Field

1984 NCAA Division I-AA independents football standings
	Conf.			Overall
Team	W	L	T	W		L		T
Tennessee State		–		11	–	0	–	0
Eastern Washington		–		7	–	2	–	1
Georgia Southern		–		8	–	3	–	0
No. 15 Holy Cross		–		8	–	3	–	0
No. 19 Delaware		–		8	–	3	–	0
No. 12 Richmond ^		–		8	–	4	–	0
James Madison		–		6	–	5	–	0
William & Mary		–		6	–	5	–	0
Bucknell		–		5	–	5	–	0
Colgate		–		5	–	5	–	0
Lafayette		–		5	–	5	–	0
Lehigh		–		5	–	6	–	0
Florida A&M		–		3	–	6	–	1
Northeastern		–		3	–	7	–	0
Western Kentucky		–		2	–	9	–	0
^ – NCAA Division I-AA playoff participant; Rankings from NCAA Division I-AA Football Committee poll

The 1984 Holy Cross Crusaders football team was an American football team that represented the College of the Holy Cross as an independent during the 1984 NCAA Division I-AA football season. The Crusaders ranked No. 15 nationally and did not qualify for the postseason.

In their fourth year under head coach Rick E. Carter, the Crusaders compiled an 8–3 record. Bill McGovern and Peter Muldoon were the team captains.

As in the previous year, Holy Cross began the campaign with a long winning streak (seven games), and was ranked as high as No. 2 in the weekly national rankings. Two late-season losses to Division I-AA foes, however, dropped them out of the upper echelon. Their third loss, in a game played after the final rankings were released, was to Division I-A powerhouse Boston College on the day that BC quarterback Doug Flutie won the Heisman Trophy.

Holy Cross played its home games at Fitton Field on the college campus in Worcester, Massachusetts.

== Schedule ==
Date	Opponent	Rank	Site	Result	Attendance	Source
September 15	Rhode Island		Fitton Field; Worcester, MA	W 19–0	9,911	
September 22	UMass	No. 5	Fitton Field; Worcester, MA	W 35–7	17,641	
September 29	at Harvard	No. 4	Harvard Stadium; Boston, MA	W 24–14	19,500	
October 6	Dartmouth^{†}	No. 3	Fitton Field; Worcester, MA	W 30–20	19,061	
October 13	at No. 12 Colgate	No. 2	Andy Kerr Stadium; Hamilton, NY	W 42–27	9,500	
October 20	Connecticut^	No. 2	Fitton Field; Worcester, MA	W 41–0	20,659	
October 27	at Brown	No. 2	Brown Stadium; Providence, RI	W 38–17	12,843	
November 3	at No. 13 Boston University	No. 2	Nickerson Field; Boston, MA	L 12–16	14,750	
November 10	No. 4 New Hampshire	No. 6	Fitton Field; Worcester, MA	L 13–14	12,441	
November 17	at Maine	No. 19	Alfond Stadium; Orono, ME	W 24–7	3,000	
December 1	Boston College	No. 15	Fitton Field; Worcester, MA (rivalry)	L 10–45	25,000	
^{†}Homecoming; ^ Family Weekend; Rankings from NCAA Division I-AA Football Committee Poll released prior to the game
