= 1984 Princeton Tigers football team =

American college football season

1984 Princeton Tigers football
- Conference: Ivy League
- Record: 4–5 (3–4 Ivy)
- Head coach: Frank Navarro (7th season)
- Offensive coordinator: Hank Small (2nd season)
- Captains: Mark A. Berggren; Chalmer S. Taylor
- Home stadium: Palmer Stadium

1984 Ivy League football standings
	Conf.					Overall
Team	W		L		T	W		L		T
Penn $	7	–	0	–	0	8	–	1	–	0
Yale	5	–	2	–	0	6	–	3	–	0
Harvard	5	–	2	–	0	5	–	4	–	0
Brown	4	–	3	–	0	4	–	5	–	0
Princeton	3	–	4	–	0	4	–	5	–	0
Cornell	2	–	5	–	0	2	–	7	–	0
Dartmouth	2	–	5	–	0	2	–	7	–	0
Columbia	0	–	7	–	0	0	–	9	–	0
$ – Conference champion

The 1984 Princeton Tigers football team was an American football team that represented Princeton University during the 1984 NCAA Division I-AA football season. Princeton finished fifth in the Ivy League.

In their seventh year under head coach Frank Navarro, the Tigers compiled a 4–5 record and were outscored 192 to 185. Mark A. Berggren and Chalmer S. Taylor were the team captains.

Princeton's 3–4 conference record placed fifth in the Ivy League standings. The Tigers outscored Ivy opponents 162 to 137.

Princeton played its home games at Palmer Stadium on the university campus in Princeton, New Jersey.

== Schedule ==
Date	Opponent	Site	Result	Attendance	Source
September 22	at Cornell	Schoellkopf Field; Ithaca, NY	W 17–9	16,300	
September 29	Bucknell*	Palmer Stadium; Princeton, NJ	W 20–14	11,150	
October 6	Brown	Palmer Stadium; Princeton, NJ	L 30–32	11,870	
October 13	at Columbia	Wien Stadium; New York, NY	W 38–8	9,621	
October 20	at Navy*	Navy–Marine Corps Memorial Stadium; Annapolis, MD	L 3–41	31,039	
October 27	Harvard	Palmer Stadium; Princeton, NJ (rivalry)	L 15–17	24,234	
November 3	Penn	Palmer Stadium; Princeton, NJ (rivalry)	L 17–27	23,275	
November 10	at Yale	Yale Bowl; New Haven, CT (rivalry)	L 24–27	26,121	
November 17	Dartmouth	Palmer Stadium; Princeton, NJ	W 21–17	11,205	
*Non-conference game
