= 1984 Delaware State Hornets football team =

American college football season

1984 Delaware State Hornets football
- Conference: Mid-Eastern Athletic Conference
- Record: 8–2 (3–1 MEAC)
- Head coach: Joe Purzycki (4th season)
- Defensive coordinator: Bill Collick (4th season)
- Home stadium: Alumni Stadium

1984 Mid-Eastern Athletic Conference football standings
	Conf.					Overall
Team	W		L		T	W		L		T
Bethune–Cookman $	4	–	0	–	0	7	–	3	–	0
Delaware State	3	–	1	–	0	8	–	2	–	0
South Carolina State	2	–	2	–	0	4	–	6	–	1
North Carolina A&T	1	–	3	–	0	2	–	8	–	0
Howard	0	–	4	–	0	2	–	8	–	0
Morgan State	0	–	0	–	0	0	–	11	–	0
$ – Conference champion; Morgan State games did not count as conference games. Morgan State was NCAA Division II. All the other teams were classified as I-AA.

The 1984 Delaware State Hornets football team represented Delaware State College (now known as Delaware State University) as a member of the Mid-Eastern Athletic Conference (MEAC) during the 1984 NCAA Division I-AA football season. Led by fourth-year head coach Joe Purzycki, the Hornets compiled an overall record of 8–2, with a mark of 3–1 in conference play, and finished second in the MEAC.

== Schedule ==
Date	Opponent	Rank	Site	Result	Attendance	Source
September 8	vs. South Carolina State		Franklin Field; Philadelphia, PA (Mideastern Athletic Conference Classic)	W 50–36		
September 15	Northeastern*		Alumni Stadium; Dover, DE	W 35–0	5,000	
September 22	at North Carolina A&T	No. 9	Aggie Stadium; Greensboro, NC	W 56–7	5,000	
September 29	at Bethune–Cookman	No. 7	Memorial Stadium; Daytona Beach, FL	L 38–41		
October 6	at James Madison*	No. 20	JMU Stadium; Harrisonburg, VA	L 19–20		
October 13	at Bowie State*		Bulldogs Stadium; Bowie, MD	W 70–8		
October 20	Towson State*		Alumni Stadium; Dover, DE	W 23–7	5,500	
October 27	Central State (OH)*		Alumni Stadium; Dover, DE	W 55–17		
November 3	at Howard		Howard Stadium; Washington, DC	W 45–7		
November 10	Liberty*		Alumni Stadium; Dover, DE	W 34–11	3,221	
*Non-conference game; Rankings from NCAA Division I-AA Football Committee Poll released prior to the game
