= 1984 Tennessee State Tigers football team =

American college football season

1984 Tennessee State Tigers football

Black college national champion
- Conference: Independent
- Record: 11–0
- Head coach: William A. Thomas (1st season)
- Home stadium: Hale Stadium; Vanderbilt Stadium

1984 NCAA Division I-AA independents football standings
	Conf.			Overall
Team	W	L	T	W		L		T
Tennessee State		–		11	–	0	–	0
Eastern Washington		–		7	–	2	–	1
Georgia Southern		–		8	–	3	–	0
No. 15 Holy Cross		–		8	–	3	–	0
No. 19 Delaware		–		8	–	3	–	0
No. 12 Richmond ^		–		8	–	4	–	0
James Madison		–		6	–	5	–	0
William & Mary		–		6	–	5	–	0
Bucknell		–		5	–	5	–	0
Colgate		–		5	–	5	–	0
Lafayette		–		5	–	5	–	0
Lehigh		–		5	–	6	–	0
Florida A&M		–		3	–	6	–	1
Northeastern		–		3	–	7	–	0
Western Kentucky		–		2	–	9	–	0
^ – NCAA Division I-AA playoff participant; Rankings from NCAA Division I-AA Football Committee poll

The 1984 Tennessee State Tigers football team represented Tennessee State University as an independent during the 1984 NCAA Division I-AA football season. Led by first-year head coach William A. Thomas, the Tigers compiled an overall record of 11–0. At the conclusion of the season, the Tigers were also recognized as black college national champion.

== Schedule ==
Date	Opponent	Rank	Site	Result	Attendance	Source
September 1	at Hampton		Armstrong Stadium; Hampton, VA	W 44–0	7,104	
September 8	vs. Jackson State		Liberty Bowl Memorial Stadium; Memphis, TN (Bluff City Classic)	W 34–14	40,000	
September 15	Alabama A&M		Hale Stadium; Nashville, TN	W 42–21	13,000	
September 21	Florida A&M	No. 10	Vanderbilt Stadium; Nashville, TN	W 41–20	25,000	
October 6	at Grambling State	No. 9	Eddie G. Robinson Memorial Stadium; Grambling, LA	W 34–24		
October 13	at Tennessee Tech	No. 7	Tucker Stadium; Cookeville, TN	W 33–3	14,623	
October 20	vs. Kentucky State	No. 3	Cardinal Stadium; Louisville, KY	W 71–0	7,500	
October 27	Southern	No. 3	Vanderbilt Stadium; Nashville, TN	W 42–7	38,500	
November 3	vs. Bethune–Cookman	No. 3	Tampa Stadium; Tampa, FL	W 41–8	9,200	
November 10	at Louisville	No. 2	Cardinal Stadium; Louisville, KY	W 24–15	23,821	
November 17	North Carolina A&T	No. 1	Hale Stadium; Nashville, TN	W 44–14	9,000	
Rankings from NCAA Division I-AA Football Committee Poll released prior to the game
