= 1984 William & Mary Tribe football team =

American college football season

1984 William & Mary Tribe football
- Conference: Independent
- Record: 6–5
- Head coach: Jimmye Laycock (5th season)
- Captains: Mark Kelso; Bobby Wright; Bobby Crane; Lee Glenn
- Home stadium: Cary Field

1984 NCAA Division I-AA independents football standings
| | Conf. | | | Overall |
| Team | W | L | T | W | | L | | T |
|---|---|---|---|---|---|---|---|---|
| Tennessee State | | – | | 11 | – | 0 | – | 0 |
| Eastern Washington | | – | | 7 | – | 2 | – | 1 |
| Georgia Southern | | – | | 8 | – | 3 | – | 0 |
| No. 15 Holy Cross | | – | | 8 | – | 3 | – | 0 |
| No. 19 Delaware | | – | | 8 | – | 3 | – | 0 |
| No. 12 Richmond ^ | | – | | 8 | – | 4 | – | 0 |
| James Madison | | – | | 6 | – | 5 | – | 0 |
| William & Mary | | – | | 6 | – | 5 | – | 0 |
| Bucknell | | – | | 5 | – | 5 | – | 0 |
| Colgate | | – | | 5 | – | 5 | – | 0 |
| Lafayette | | – | | 5 | – | 5 | – | 0 |
| Lehigh | | – | | 5 | – | 6 | – | 0 |
| Florida A&M | | – | | 3 | – | 6 | – | 1 |
| Northeastern | | – | | 3 | – | 7 | – | 0 |
| Western Kentucky | | – | | 2 | – | 9 | – | 0 |
^ – NCAA Division I-AA playoff participant; Rankings from NCAA Division I-AA Football Committee poll

The 1984 William & Mary Tribe football team represented the College of William & Mary as an independent during the 1984 NCAA Division I-AA football season. Led by Jimmye Laycock in his fifth year as head coach, William & Mary finished the season with a record of 6–5.

== Schedule ==
| Date | Opponent | Rank | Site | Result | Attendance | Source |
|---|---|---|---|---|---|---|
| September 8 | VMI | | Cary Field; Williamsburg, VA (rivalry) | W 24–13 | 11,300 | |
| September 15 | at Delaware | | Delaware Stadium; Newark, DE (rivalry) | W 23–21 | 15,928 | |
| September 22 | at No. 7 (I-A) Penn State | No. 8 | Beaver Stadium; University Park, PA | L 18–56 | 84,704 | |
| September 29 | at James Madison | | JMU Stadium; Harrisonburg, VA (rivalry) | W 20–10 | 8,300 | |
| October 6 | Temple | | Cary Field; Williamsburg, VA | L 14–28 | 10,400 | |
| October 13 | No. 5 Boston University | | Cary Field; Williamsburg, VA | W 24–3 | 11,200 | |
| October 20 | at Virginia Tech | No. 12 | Lane Stadium; Blacksburg, VA | L 14–38 | 34,500 | |
| October 27 | at Wake Forest | No. 19 | Groves Stadium; Winston-Salem, NC | L 21–34 | 23,712 | |
| November 3 | Lehigh | | Cary Field; Williamsburg, VA | W 24–10 | 17,000 | |
| November 10 | at Colgate | | Andy Kerr Stadium; Hamilton, NY | W 48–39 | 3,500 | |
| November 17 | at No. 13 Richmond | No. 18 | University of Richmond Stadium; Richmond, VA (I-64 Bowl) | L 31–33 | 21,484 | |
Rankings from NCAA Division I-AA Football Committee Poll released prior to the game
