= 1984 Marshall Thundering Herd football team =

American college football season

1984 Marshall Thundering Herd football
- Conference: Southern Conference
- Record: 6–5 (2–4 SoCon)
- Head coach: Stan Parrish (1st season)
- Captains: Rob Bowers; Tony Lellie
- Home stadium: Fairfield Stadium

1984 Southern Conference football standings
	Conf.					Overall
Team	W		L		T	W		L		T
No. 17 Chattanooga $^	5	–	1	–	0	6	–	5	–	0
No. 14 Western Carolina	5	–	2	–	0	8	–	3	–	0
The Citadel	4	–	2	–	0	7	–	4	–	0
No. 16 Furman	3	–	3	–	0	8	–	3	–	0
East Tennessee State	2	–	4	–	0	6	–	5	–	0
Marshall	2	–	4	–	0	6	–	5	–	0
Appalachian State	2	–	5	–	0	4	–	7	–	0
VMI	1	–	4	–	0	1	–	9	–	0
Davidson	0	–	2	–	0	2	–	8	–	0
$ – Conference champion; ^ – NCAA Division I-AA playoff participant; Rankings from NCAA Division I-AA Football Committee poll

The 1984 Marshall Thundering Herd football team was an American football team that represented Marshall University in the Southern Conference (SoCon) during the 1984 NCAA Division I-AA football season. In its first season under head coach Stan Parrish, the team compiled a 6–5 record (2–4 against conference opponents) and played its home games at Fairfield Stadium in Huntington, West Virginia. It marked the Thundering Herd's first winning season since 1964.

== Schedule ==
Date	Opponent	Site	Result	Attendance	Source
September 1	West Virginia Tech*	Fairfield Stadium; Huntington, WV	W 33–10		
September 8	Morehead State*	Fairfield Stadium; Huntington, WV	W 40–6	16,121	
September 15	Eastern Michigan*	Fairfield Stadium; Huntington, WV	W 24–17		
September 22	No. 1 Furman	Fairfield Stadium; Huntington, WV	L 28–38	18,065	
September 29	at Western Michigan*	Waldo Stadium; Kalamazoo, MI	L 7–42		
October 13	Appalachian State^{†}	Fairfield Stadium; Huntington, WV (rivalry)	W 35–7	14,529	
October 20	at The Citadel	Johnson Hagood Stadium; Charleston, SC	L 17–28	17,150	
October 27	Chattanooga	Fairfield Stadium; Huntington, WV	L 13–17	12,211	
November 3	Western Carolina	Fairfield Stadium; Huntington, WV	L 0–30	8,414	
November 10	at Illinois State*	Hancock Stadium; Normal, IL	W 10–3		
November 17	at East Tennessee State	Memorial Center; Johnson City, TN	W 31–28	6,102	
*Non-conference game; ^{†}Homecoming; Rankings from NCAA Division I-AA Football Committee Poll released prior to the game
