= 1984 Liberty Flames football team =

American college football season

1984 Liberty Flames football
- Conference: Independent
- Record: 5–6
- Head coach: Morgan Hout (1st season)
- Home stadium: City Stadium

1984 NCAA Division II independents football records
	Conf.			Overall
Team	W	L	T	W		L		T
No. T–3 Central State (OH) ^		–		9	–	2	–	0
No. 8 Towson State ^		–		9	–	4	–	0
Southern Connecticut State		–		7	–	3	–	0
Central Connecticut		–		6	–	4	–	0
Northern Michigan		–		6	–	4	–	0
New Haven		–		5	–	5	–	0
Liberty		–		5	–	6	–	0
Saint Mary's		–		5	–	6	–	0
American International		–		4	–	6	–	0
Springfield		–		3	–	7	–	0
Kentucky State		–		2	–	9	–	0
UCF		–		2	–	9	–	0
^ – NCAA Division II playoff participant; Rankings from NCAA Division II Football Committee poll

The 1984 Liberty Flames football team represented Liberty University as an independent during the 1984 NCAA Division II football season. Led by first-year head coach Morgan Hout, the Flames compiled an overall record of 5–6.

== Schedule ==
Date	Opponent	Site	Result	Attendance	Source
September 8	Towson State	City Stadium; Lynchburg, VA	L 10–35	4,364	
September 15	at Virginia State	Rogers Stadium; Ettrick, VA	W 16–3	1,100	
September 22	James Madison	City Stadium; Lynchburg, VA	L 43–52	4,921	
September 29	at Georgia Southern	Paulson Stadium; Statesboro, GA	L 11–48	12,097	
October 6	Mars Hill	City Stadium; Lynchburg, VA	W 42–27	2,543	
October 13	at West Georgia	Grisham Stadium; Carrollton, GA	L 31–52	4,800	
October 20	Lenoir–Rhyne	City Stadium; Lynchburg, VA	W 37–27	5,484	
October 27	at Presbyterian	Bailey Stadium; Clinton, SC	L 13–17	4,138	
November 3	Wofford	City Stadium; Lynchburg, VA	W 38–21	2,254	
November 10	at Delaware State	Alumni Stadium; Dover, DE	L 11–34	3,221	
November 17	Carson–Newman	City Stadium; Lynchburg, VA	W 27–14	2,733	
