= 1984 Chattanooga Moccasins football team =

American college football season

1984 Chattanooga Moccasins football

SoCon champion

NCAA Division I-AA First Round, L 10–37 vs Arkansas State
- Conference: Southern Conference
- Record: 6–5 (5–1 SoCon)
- Head coach: Buddy Nix (1st season)
- Captains: Artis Edwards; Bob Standifer
- Home stadium: Chamberlain Field

1984 Southern Conference football standings
	Conf.					Overall
Team	W		L		T	W		L		T
No. 17 Chattanooga $^	5	–	1	–	0	6	–	5	–	0
No. 14 Western Carolina	5	–	2	–	0	8	–	3	–	0
The Citadel	4	–	2	–	0	7	–	4	–	0
No. 16 Furman	3	–	3	–	0	8	–	3	–	0
East Tennessee State	2	–	4	–	0	6	–	5	–	0
Marshall	2	–	4	–	0	6	–	5	–	0
Appalachian State	2	–	5	–	0	4	–	7	–	0
VMI	1	–	4	–	0	1	–	9	–	0
Davidson	0	–	2	–	0	2	–	8	–	0
$ – Conference champion; ^ – NCAA Division I-AA playoff participant; Rankings from NCAA Division I-AA Football Committee poll

The 1984 Chattanooga Moccasins football team represented the University of Tennessee at Chattanooga as a member of the Southern Conference (SoCon) in the 1984 NCAA Division I-AA football season. The Moccasins were led by first-year head coach Buddy Nix and played their home games at Chamberlain Field. They finished the season 6–5 overall and won the SoCon title with 5–1 mark.

== Schedule ==
Date	Opponent	Rank	Site	Result	Attendance	Source
September 1	Southwestern Louisiana*		Chamberlain Field; Chattanooga, TN	W 9–7	9,438	
September 8	Arkansas State*		Chamberlain Field; Chattanooga, TN	L 0–16	8,882	
September 15	Western Carolina		Chamberlain Field; Chattanooga, TN	W 10–6	8,239	
September 29	No. 1 Furman	No. 20	Chamberlain Field; Chattanooga, TN	W 21–14	10,038	
October 6	East Tennessee State^{†}	No. 8	Chamberlain Field; Chattanooga, TN	L 0–12	9,103	
October 13	at No. 17 Georgia Southern*	No. 20	Paulson Stadium; Statesboro, GA	L 17–24	9,087	
October 20	at VMI		Alumni Memorial Field; Lexington, VA	W 35–0	6,300	
October 27	at Marshall		Fairfield Stadium; Huntington, WV	W 17–13	12,211	
November 10	Appalachian State		Chamberlain Field; Chattanooga, TN	W 21–20	3,620	
November 17	at No. 17 (I-A) Florida State*	No. 19	Doak Campbell Stadium; Tallahassee, FL	L 0–37	55,443	
November 24	at No. 10 Arkansas State*	No. 17	Indian Stadium; Jonesboro, AR (NCAA Division I-AA First Round)	L 10–37	10,872	
*Non-conference game; ^{†}Homecoming; Rankings from NCAA Division I-AA Football Committee Poll released prior to the game
