= 1984 Lehigh Engineers football team =

American college football season

1984 Lehigh Engineers football
- Conference: Independent
- Record: 5–6
- Head coach: John Whitehead (9th season)
- Captains: Mike Ellow; Doug Ertz; Tony Semler; Blair Talmadge
- Home stadium: Taylor Stadium

1984 NCAA Division I-AA independents football standings
	Conf.			Overall
Team	W	L	T	W		L		T
Tennessee State		–		11	–	0	–	0
Eastern Washington		–		7	–	2	–	1
Georgia Southern		–		8	–	3	–	0
No. 15 Holy Cross		–		8	–	3	–	0
No. 19 Delaware		–		8	–	3	–	0
No. 12 Richmond ^		–		8	–	4	–	0
James Madison		–		6	–	5	–	0
William & Mary		–		6	–	5	–	0
Bucknell		–		5	–	5	–	0
Colgate		–		5	–	5	–	0
Lafayette		–		5	–	5	–	0
Lehigh		–		5	–	6	–	0
Florida A&M		–		3	–	6	–	1
Northeastern		–		3	–	7	–	0
Western Kentucky		–		2	–	9	–	0
^ – NCAA Division I-AA playoff participant; Rankings from NCAA Division I-AA Football Committee poll

The 1984 Lehigh Engineers football team was an American football team that represented Lehigh University as an independent during the 1984 NCAA Division I-AA football season.

In their ninth year under head coach John Whitehead, the Engineers compiled a 5–6 record. Mike Ellow, Doug Ertz, Tony Semler and Blair Talmadge were the team captains.

Lehigh was briefly ranked in the national Division I-AA top 20, at No. 15 in the poll released September 18, but quickly dropped out of the rankings and remained unranked through season's end.

Lehigh played its home games at Taylor Stadium on the university's main campus in Bethlehem, Pennsylvania.

== Schedule ==
Date	Opponent	Site	Result	Attendance	Source
September 8	at UMass	Alumni Stadium; Hadley, MA	W 21–14	11,871	
September 15	at Connecticut	Memorial Stadium; Storrs, CT	W 10–7	4,821	
September 22	Colgate	Taylor Stadium; Bethlehem, PA	L 35–40	12,500	
September 29	Delaware	Taylor Stadium; Bethlehem, PA (rivalry)	W 46–6	12,000	
October 6	at Northeastern	Parsons Field; Brookline, MA	W 25–14	4,350	
October 13	at Navy	Navy–Marine Corps Memorial Stadium; Annapolis, MD	L 14–31	21,547	
October 20	No. 16 New Hampshire	Taylor Stadium; Bethlehem, PA	L 10–34	10,500	
October 27	No. 6 Rhode Island	Taylor Stadium; Bethlehem, PA	L 16–24	12,500	
November 3	at William & Mary	Cary Field; Williamsburg, VA	L 10–24	17,000	
November 10	Bucknell	Taylor Stadium; Bethlehem, PA	W 21–15	9,500	
November 17	at Lafayette	Fisher Field; Easton, PA (The Rivalry)	L 7–28	17,000	
Rankings from the latest NCAA Division I-AA poll released prior to the game
