= 1984 Western Carolina Catamounts football team =

American college football season

1984 Western Carolina Catamounts football
- Conference: Southern Conference
- Record: 8–3 (5–2 SoCon)
- Head coach: Bob Waters (16th season)
- Home stadium: E. J. Whitmire Stadium

1984 Southern Conference football standings
	Conf.					Overall
Team	W		L		T	W		L		T
No. 17 Chattanooga $^	5	–	1	–	0	6	–	5	–	0
No. 14 Western Carolina	5	–	2	–	0	8	–	3	–	0
The Citadel	4	–	2	–	0	7	–	4	–	0
No. 16 Furman	3	–	3	–	0	8	–	3	–	0
East Tennessee State	2	–	4	–	0	6	–	5	–	0
Marshall	2	–	4	–	0	6	–	5	–	0
Appalachian State	2	–	5	–	0	4	–	7	–	0
VMI	1	–	4	–	0	1	–	9	–	0
Davidson	0	–	2	–	0	2	–	8	–	0
$ – Conference champion; ^ – NCAA Division I-AA playoff participant; Rankings from NCAA Division I-AA Football Committee poll

The 1984 Western Carolina Catamounts team was an American football team that represented Western Carolina University as a member of the Southern Conference (SoCon) during the 1984 NCAA Division I-AA football season. In their 16th year under head coach Bob Waters, the team compiled an overall record of 8–3, with a mark of 5–2 in conference play, and finished second in the SoCon.

== Schedule ==
Date	Opponent	Rank	Site	Result	Attendance	Source
September 1	at No. 19 (I-A) Boston College*		Alumni Stadium; Chestnut Hill, MA	L 24–44	32,000	
September 8	Davidson*		E. J. Whitmire Stadium; Cullowhee, NC	W 45–13	9,266	
September 15	at Chattanooga		Chamberlain Field; Chattanooga, TN	L 6–10	8,239	
September 22	at VMI		Alumni Memorial Field; Lexington, VA	W 22–16	4,600	
September 29	Tennessee Tech*		E. J. Whitmire Stadium; Cullowhee, NC	W 34–6	10,444	
October 6	at Appalachian State		Conrad Stadium; Boone, NC (rivalry)	W 34–7	18,629	
October 13	The Citadel	No. 19	E. J. Whitmire Stadium; Cullowhee, NC	L 33–34	12,204	
October 20	Wofford*		E. J. Whitmire Stadium; Cullowhee, NC	W 31–0	6,858	
October 27	at No. 12 Furman		Paladin Stadium; Greenville, SC	W 20–19	12,514	
November 3	Marshall		E. J. Whitmire Stadium; Cullowhee, NC	W 30–0	8,414	
November 10	at East Tennessee State	No. 18	Memorial Center; Johnson City, TN	W 31–17		
*Non-conference game; Rankings from NCAA Division I-AA Football Committee Poll released prior to the game
