= 1984 Georgia Southern Eagles football team =

American college football season

1984 Georgia Southern Eagles football
- Conference: Independent
- Record: 8–3
- Head coach: Erk Russell (3rd season)
- Home stadium: Paulson Stadium

1984 NCAA Division I-AA independents football standings
	Conf.			Overall
Team	W	L	T	W		L		T
Tennessee State		–		11	–	0	–	0
Eastern Washington		–		7	–	2	–	1
Georgia Southern		–		8	–	3	–	0
No. 15 Holy Cross		–		8	–	3	–	0
No. 19 Delaware		–		8	–	3	–	0
No. 12 Richmond ^		–		8	–	4	–	0
James Madison		–		6	–	5	–	0
William & Mary		–		6	–	5	–	0
Bucknell		–		5	–	5	–	0
Colgate		–		5	–	5	–	0
Lafayette		–		5	–	5	–	0
Lehigh		–		5	–	6	–	0
Florida A&M		–		3	–	6	–	1
Northeastern		–		3	–	7	–	0
Western Kentucky		–		2	–	9	–	0
^ – NCAA Division I-AA playoff participant; Rankings from NCAA Division I-AA Football Committee poll

The 1984 Georgia Southern Eagles football team represented the Georgia Southern Eagles of Georgia Southern College (now known as Georgia Southern University) during the 1984 NCAA Division I-AA football season. The Eagles played their home games at Paulson Stadium in Statesboro, Georgia. The team was coached by Erk Russell, in his third year as head coach for the Eagles.

== Schedule ==
Date	Opponent	Rank	Site	Result	Attendance	Source
September 1	vs. Florida A&M		Memorial Stadium; Savannah, GA	W 14–0	12,743	
September 8	at Presbyterian		Bailey Memorial Stadium; Clinton, SC	W 41–6	2,464	
September 15	at UCF		Florida Citrus Bowl; Orlando, FL	W 42–28	7,124	
September 22	at East Carolina		Ficklen Memorial Stadium; Greenville, NC	L 27–34	25,137	
September 29	Liberty		Paulson Stadium; Statesboro, GA	W 48–11	12,097	
October 6	vs. Bethune–Cookman		Gator Bowl; Jacksonville, FL	W 43–33	4,700	
October 13	No. 20 Chattanooga	No. 17	Paulson Stadium; Statesboro, GA	W 24–17	9,087	
October 20	Newberry	No. 13	Paulson Stadium; Statesboro, GA	W 41–16	11,420	
October 27	Valdosta State	No. 11	Paulson Stadium; Statesboro, GA	W 38–8	8,656	
November 3	at East Tennessee State	No. 7	Memorial Center; Johnson City, TN	L 17–20	10,112	
November 10	at No. T–12 Middle Tennessee State	No. 11	Johnny "Red" Floyd Stadium; Murfreesboro, TN	L 7–42	6,000	
Rankings from NCAA Division I-AA Football Committee Poll released prior to the game
