= 1984 Delaware Fightin' Blue Hens football team =

American college football season

1984 Delaware Fightin' Blue Hens football
- Conference: Independent
- Record: 8–3
- Head coach: Tubby Raymond (19th season)
- Offensive coordinator: Ted Kempski (17th season)
- Offensive scheme: Delaware Wing-T
- Base defense: 5–2
- Home stadium: Delaware Stadium

1984 NCAA Division I-AA independents football standings
	Conf.			Overall
Team	W	L	T	W		L		T
Tennessee State		–		11	–	0	–	0
Eastern Washington		–		7	–	2	–	1
Georgia Southern		–		8	–	3	–	0
No. 15 Holy Cross		–		8	–	3	–	0
No. 19 Delaware		–		8	–	3	–	0
No. 12 Richmond ^		–		8	–	4	–	0
James Madison		–		6	–	5	–	0
William & Mary		–		6	–	5	–	0
Bucknell		–		5	–	5	–	0
Colgate		–		5	–	5	–	0
Lafayette		–		5	–	5	–	0
Lehigh		–		5	–	6	–	0
Florida A&M		–		3	–	6	–	1
Northeastern		–		3	–	7	–	0
Western Kentucky		–		2	–	9	–	0
^ – NCAA Division I-AA playoff participant; Rankings from NCAA Division I-AA Football Committee poll

The 1984 Delaware Fightin' Blue Hens football team represented the University of Delaware as an independent during the 1984 NCAA Division I-AA football season. Led by 19th-year head coach Tubby Raymond, the Fightin' Blue Hens compiled a record of 8–3. The team played home games at Delaware Stadium in Newark, Delaware.

This season was the first in which Rich Gannon started at quarterback.

== Schedule ==
Date	Opponent	Site	Result	Attendance	Source
September 8	James Madison	Delaware Stadium; Newark, DE (rivalry)	W 32–3	16,419	
September 15	William & Mary	Delaware Stadium; Newark, DE (rivalry)	L 21–23	15,928	
September 22	No. 10 (D-II) West Chester	Delaware Stadium; Newark, DE (rivalry)	W 21–20	16,618	
September 29	at Lehigh	Taylor Stadium; Bethlehem, PA (rivalry)	L 6–46	12,000	
October 6	at No. 5 Boston University	Nickerson Field; Boston, MA	L 3–27	4,303	
October 13	Maine^{†}	Delaware Stadium; Newark, DE	W 37–7	19,426	
October 20	at Temple	Veterans Stadium; Philadelphia, PA	W 34–19	9,526	
October 27	Towson State	Delaware Stadium; Newark, DE	W 56–23	18,701	
November 3	Morgan State	Delaware Stadium; Newark, DE	W 76–0	12,095	
November 10	UMass	Delaware Stadium; Newark, DE	W 27–14	13,367	
November 17	Bucknell	Delaware Stadium; Newark, DE	W 28–9	15,088	
^{†}Homecoming; Rankings from NCAA Division I-AA Football Committee Poll released prior to the game

== Roster ==
1984 Delaware Fightin' Blue Hens football team roster
Players
Coaches
Offense

Pos.	#	Name	Class
QB	16	Rich Gannon	So
RB	33	Dan Reeder	Sr
WR	82	Todd Lott	So

Defense

Pos.	#	Name	Class
DT	92	Bob Wetzelberger	Sr
LB	29	David Wallace	Sr

Special teams

Pos.	#	Name	Class

Head coach

- Tubby Raymond

Coordinators/assistant coaches

Legend

- (C) Team captain
- (S) Suspended
- (I) Ineligible
- Injured
- Redshirt

Roster
