= 1984 NCAA Division I-AA football season =

American college football season

1984 NCAA Division I-AA season

Regular season
- Number of teams: 87
- Duration: August–November

Playoff
- Duration: November 24–December 15
- Championship date: December 15, 1984
- Championship site: Johnson Hagood Stadium; Charleston, South Carolina
- Champion: Montana State

NCAA Division I-AA football seasons
- «1983 1985»

The 1984 NCAA Division I-AA football season, part of college football in the United States organized by the National Collegiate Athletic Association at the Division I-AA level, began in August 1984, and concluded with the 1984 NCAA Division I-AA Football Championship Game on December 15, 1984, at Johnson Hagood Stadium in Charleston, South Carolina. The Montana State Bobcats won their first I-AA championship, defeating the Louisiana Tech Bulldogs by a score of 19−6.

== Conference changes and new programs ==
- Prior to the season, the Gulf Star Conference was formed by three I-AA Independents and three reclassifying Division II institutions from Louisiana and Texas.
- Georgia Southern, which had revived their football program as a club team in 1982 after cutting it in 1941, went varsity this year.
- Morgan State rejoined the MEAC in 1984, but remained classified as Division II. All other MEAC teams were Division I-AA.

School	1983 Conference	1984 Conference
Eastern Washington	D-II Independent	I-AA Independent
Florida A&M	MEAC	I-AA Independent
Georgia Southern	Club Program	I-AA Independent
Morgan State	Independent (D-II)	MEAC
Nicholls State	I-AA Independent	Gulf Star
Northwestern State	I-AA Independent	Gulf Star
Southeastern Louisiana	I-AA Independent	Gulf Star
Sam Houston State	Lone Star (D-II)	Gulf Star (I-AA)
Southwest Texas State	Lone Star (D-II)	Gulf Star (I-AA)
Stephen F. Austin	Lone Star (D-II)	Gulf Star (I-AA)

== Conference standings ==
1984 Association of Mid-Continent Universities football standings
	Conf.					Overall
Team	W		L		T	W		L		T
No. 18 Northern Iowa +	2	–	1	–	0	9	–	2	–	0
Eastern Illinois +	2	–	1	–	0	6	–	5	–	0
Southwest Missouri State	1	–	1	–	1	6	–	3	–	1
Western Illinois	0	–	2	–	1	6	–	4	–	1
+ – Conference co-champions; Rankings from NCAA Division I-AA Football Committee poll

1984 Big Sky Conference football standings
	Conf.					Overall
Team	W		L		T	W		L		T
No. 2 Montana State $^	6	–	1	–	0	12	–	2	–	0
Nevada	5	–	2	–	0	7	–	4	–	0
Boise State	4	–	3	–	0	6	–	5	–	0
Idaho	4	–	3	–	0	6	–	5	–	0
Idaho State	4	–	3	–	0	5	–	6	–	0
Weber State	3	–	4	–	0	5	–	6	–	0
Northern Arizona	2	–	5	–	0	4	–	6	–	0
Montana	0	–	7	–	0	2	–	8	–	1
$ – Conference champion; ^ – NCAA Division I-AA playoff participant; Rankings from NCAA Division I-AA Poll

1984 Gulf Star Conference football standings
	Conf.					Overall
Team	W		L		T	W		L		T
Northwestern State +	4	–	1	–	0	7	–	4	–	0
Nicholls State +	4	–	1	–	0	6	–	5	–	0
Sam Houston State	3	–	2	–	0	8	–	3	–	0
Southwest Texas State	2	–	3	–	0	7	–	4	–	0
Stephen F. Austin	1	–	3	–	1	7	–	3	–	1
Southeastern Louisiana	0	–	4	–	1	2	–	8	–	1
$ – Conference champion; The conference was a hybrid of NCAA Division I-AA and Division II programs. Stephen F. Austin was classified NCAA Division II. Sam Houston State was classified as Division II. All the other teams were I-AA. All the other teams were Division I-AA.

1984 Ivy League football standings
	Conf.					Overall
Team	W		L		T	W		L		T
Penn $	7	–	0	–	0	8	–	1	–	0
Yale	5	–	2	–	0	6	–	3	–	0
Harvard	5	–	2	–	0	5	–	4	–	0
Brown	4	–	3	–	0	4	–	5	–	0
Princeton	3	–	4	–	0	4	–	5	–	0
Cornell	2	–	5	–	0	2	–	7	–	0
Dartmouth	2	–	5	–	0	2	–	7	–	0
Columbia	0	–	7	–	0	0	–	9	–	0
$ – Conference champion

1984 Mid-Eastern Athletic Conference football standings
	Conf.					Overall
Team	W		L		T	W		L		T
Bethune–Cookman $	4	–	0	–	0	7	–	3	–	0
Delaware State	3	–	1	–	0	8	–	2	–	0
South Carolina State	2	–	2	–	0	4	–	6	–	1
North Carolina A&T	1	–	3	–	0	2	–	8	–	0
Howard	0	–	4	–	0	2	–	8	–	0
Morgan State	0	–	0	–	0	0	–	11	–	0
$ – Conference champion; Morgan State games did not count as conference games. Morgan State was NCAA Division II. All the other teams were classified as I-AA.

1984 Missouri Valley Conference football standings
	Conf.					Overall
Team	W		L		T	W		L		T
Tulsa $	5	–	0	–	0	6	–	5	–	0
No. 5 Indiana State ^	4	–	1	–	0	9	–	3	–	0
Illinois State	3	–	2	–	0	5	–	6	–	0
West Texas State	2	–	3	–	0	3	–	8	–	0
Wichita State	2	–	3	–	0	2	–	9	–	0
Drake	2	–	3	–	0	4	–	7	–	0
Southern Illinois	0	–	5	–	0	3	–	8	–	0
$ – Conference champion; ^ – NCAA Division I-AA playoff participant; Indiana State's game against Louisville and West Texas State and Wichita State's games against New Mexico State counted in the conference standings. The conference was a hybrid of NCAA Division I-A and I-AA programs. Tulsa and Wichita State were I-A and the other teams were I-AA.; Rankings from NCAA Division I-AA Football Committee poll

1984 Ohio Valley Conference football standings
	Conf.					Overall
Team	W		L		T	W		L		T
No. 8 Eastern Kentucky $^	6	–	1	–	0	8	–	4	–	0
No. 7 Middle Tennessee ^	5	–	2	–	0	11	–	3	–	0
No. 13 Murray State	5	–	2	–	0	9	–	2	–	0
Youngstown State	5	–	2	–	0	7	–	4	–	0
Austin Peay	4	–	3	–	0	7	–	4	–	0
Akron	2	–	5	–	0	4	–	7	–	0
Morehead State	1	–	6	–	0	2	–	9	–	0
Tennessee Tech	0	–	7	–	0	0	–	11	–	0
$ – Conference champion; ^ – NCAA Division I-AA playoff participant; Rankings from NCAA Division I-AA Football Committee poll

1984 Southern Conference football standings
	Conf.					Overall
Team	W		L		T	W		L		T
No. 17 Chattanooga $^	5	–	1	–	0	6	–	5	–	0
No. 14 Western Carolina	5	–	2	–	0	8	–	3	–	0
The Citadel	4	–	2	–	0	7	–	4	–	0
No. 16 Furman	3	–	3	–	0	8	–	3	–	0
East Tennessee State	2	–	4	–	0	6	–	5	–	0
Marshall	2	–	4	–	0	6	–	5	–	0
Appalachian State	2	–	5	–	0	4	–	7	–	0
VMI	1	–	4	–	0	1	–	9	–	0
Davidson	0	–	2	–	0	2	–	8	–	0
$ – Conference champion; ^ – NCAA Division I-AA playoff participant; Rankings from NCAA Division I-AA Football Committee poll

1984 Southland Conference football standings
	Conf.					Overall
Team	W		L		T	W		L		T
No. 9 Louisiana Tech $^	5	–	1	–	0	10	–	5	–	0
No. 10 Arkansas State ^	4	–	1	–	1	8	–	4	–	1
UT Arlington	4	–	2	–	0	7	–	4	–	0
Northeast Louisiana	3	–	3	–	0	7	–	4	–	0
No. 20 McNeese State	2	–	3	–	1	7	–	3	–	1
Lamar	1	–	5	–	0	2	–	9	–	0
North Texas State	1	–	5	–	0	2	–	9	–	0
$ – Conference champion; ^ – NCAA Division I-AA playoff participant; Rankings from NCAA Division I-AA Football Committee poll

1984 Southwestern Athletic Conference football standings
	Conf.					Overall
Team	W		L		T	W		L		T
No. 1 Alcorn State $^	7	–	0	–	0	9	–	1	–	0
No. 6 Mississippi Valley State ^	6	–	1	–	0	9	–	2	–	0
Grambling State	5	–	2	–	0	7	–	4	–	0
Southern	4	–	3	–	0	6	–	5	–	0
Jackson State	3	–	4	–	0	4	–	5	–	1
Texas Southern	2	–	5	–	0	5	–	6	–	0
Alabama State	1	–	6	–	0	2	–	9	–	0
Prairie View A&M	0	–	7	–	0	0	–	11	–	0
$ – Conference champion; ^ – NCAA Division I-AA playoff participant; Rankings from NCAA Division I-AA Football Committee poll

1984 Yankee Conference football standings
	Conf.					Overall
Team	W		L		T	W		L		T
No. 3 Rhode Island +^	4	–	1	–	0	10	–	3	–	0
No. 4 Boston University +^	4	–	1	–	0	9	–	3	–	0
No. 11 New Hampshire	3	–	2	–	0	9	–	2	–	0
Maine	2	–	3	–	0	5	–	6	–	0
Connecticut	1	–	4	–	0	3	–	8	–	0
UMass	1	–	4	–	0	3	–	8	–	0
+ – Conference co-champions; ^ – NCAA Division I-AA playoff participant; Rankings from NCAA Division I-AA Football Committee poll

1984 NCAA Division I-AA independents football standings
	Conf.			Overall
Team	W	L	T	W		L		T
Tennessee State		–		11	–	0	–	0
Eastern Washington		–		7	–	2	–	1
Georgia Southern		–		8	–	3	–	0
No. 15 Holy Cross		–		8	–	3	–	0
No. 19 Delaware		–		8	–	3	–	0
No. 12 Richmond ^		–		8	–	4	–	0
James Madison		–		6	–	5	–	0
William & Mary		–		6	–	5	–	0
Bucknell		–		5	–	5	–	0
Colgate		–		5	–	5	–	0
Lafayette		–		5	–	5	–	0
Lehigh		–		5	–	6	–	0
Florida A&M		–		3	–	6	–	1
Northeastern		–		3	–	7	–	0
Western Kentucky		–		2	–	9	–	0
^ – NCAA Division I-AA playoff participant; Rankings from NCAA Division I-AA Football Committee poll

== Conference champions ==
Conference champions

Big Sky Conference – Montana State
Gulf Star Conference – Nicholls State and Northwestern State
Ivy League – Penn
Mid-Continent Conference – Eastern Illinois and Northern Iowa
Mid-Eastern Athletic Conference – Bethune-Cookman
Ohio Valley Conference – Eastern Kentucky
Southern Conference – Chattanooga
Southland Conference – Louisiana Tech
Southwestern Athletic Conference – Alcorn State
Yankee Conference – Boston University and Rhode Island

== Postseason ==
The top four teams were seeded, and received first-round byes. Undefeated Tennessee State was disqualified from the postseason due to the use of ineligible players.

=== NCAA Division I-AA playoff bracket ===
First Round; November 24; Campus sites
Louisiana Tech	66
Mississippi Valley State	19
Eastern Kentucky	10
Middle Tennessee	27
Richmond	35
Boston University	33
Arkansas State	37
Chattanooga	10

Quarterfinals; December 1 Campus sites
(1) Alcorn State	21
Louisiana Tech	44
(4) Indiana State	41
Middle Tennessee	42***
(2) Rhode Island	23
Richmond	17
(3) Montana State	31
Arkansas State	14

Semifinals; December 8 Campus sites
Louisiana Tech	21
Middle Tennessee	13
(2) Rhode Island	20
(3) Montana State	32

National Championship Game; December 15; Neutral Site
Louisiana Tech	6
(3) Montana State	19

*indicates overtime period
