= 1984 NCAA Division I-AA football rankings =

The 1984 NCAA Division I-AA football rankings are from the NCAA Division I-AA football committee. This is for the 1984 season.

Tennessee State was ranked number 1 in the next to last poll of the year and was unranked in the last poll. This was the result of 14 players being declared ineligible prior to the Division I-AA final poll and playoffs. Tennessee State finished 11–0, but was not invited to the post-season.

== Legend ==
	Increase in ranking
	Decrease in ranking
	Not ranked previous week
(#–#)	Win–loss record
(Italics)	Number of first place votes
т	Tied with team above or below also with this symbol

== NCAA Division I-AA Football Committee poll ==
	Week 1 Sept 18	Week 2 Sept 25	Week 3 Oct 2	Week 4 Oct 9	Week 5 Oct 16	Week 6 Oct 23	Week 7 Oct 30	Week 8 Nov 6	Week 9 Nov 13	Week 10 Nov 20	
1.	Furman (3–0) (8)	Furman (4–0)	Indiana State (4–0)	Indiana State (5–0)	Indiana State (6–0)	Indiana State (7–0) (4)	Indiana State (8–0)	Indiana State (9–0) (4)	Tennessee State (10–0) (4)	Alcorn State (9–0) (4)	1.
2.	McNeese State (3–0)	Indiana State (3–0)	McNeese State (4–0)	Holy Cross (4–0)	Holy Cross (5–0)	Holy Cross (6–0)	Holy Cross (7–0)	Tennessee State (9–0)	Alcorn State (8–0)	Montana State (9–2)	2.
3.	Indiana State (2–0)	McNeese State (4–0)	Holy Cross (3–0)	Murray State (5–0)	Tennessee State (6–0)	Tennessee State (7–0)	Tennessee State (8–0)	Alcorn State (7–0)	Indiana State (9–1)	Rhode Island (9–2)	3.
4.	Northeast Louisiana (3–0)	Holy Cross (2–0)	Murray State (4–0)	Alcorn State (4–0)	Alcorn State (4–0)	Alcorn State (5–0)	Alcorn State (6–0)	New Hampshire (8–1)	New Hampshire (9–1)	Boston University (9–2)	4.
5.	Holy Cross (1–0)	Northeast Louisiana (3–0)	Boston University (4–0)	Boston University (5–0)	Middle Tennessee State (6–0)	Mississippi Valley State (6–0)	Mississippi Valley State (7–0)	Boston University (7–2)	Boston University (8–2)	Indiana State (9–2)	5.
6.	Murray State (2–0)	Murray State (3–0)	Furman (4–1)	Furman (4–1)	Furman (5–1)	Rhode Island (7–1)	Rhode Island (8–1)	Holy Cross (7–1)	Montana State (8–2) т	Mississippi Valley State (9–1)	6.
7.	Boston University (2–0)	Delaware State (3–0)	Alcorn State (3–0)	Tennessee State (5–0)	McNeese State (5–1)	Middle Tennessee State (6–1)	Georgia Southern (8–1)	Northeast Louisiana (7–2)	Rhode Island (9–2) т	Middle Tennessee State (9–2)	7.
8.	William & Mary (2–0)	Boston University (3–0)	Chattanooga (3–1)	Middle Tennessee State (5–0)	Mississippi Valley State (5–0)	Boise State (5–2)	New Hampshire (7–1)	Mississippi Valley State (7–1)	Mississippi Valley State (8–1)	Eastern Kentucky (8–3)	8.
9.	Delaware State (2–0)	Arkansas State (3–1)	Tennessee State (4–0)	Arkansas State (4–2)	Murray State (5–1)	McNeese State (5–1–1)	Louisiana Tech (6–3)	Rhode Island (8–2)	Middle Tennessee State (8–2)	Louisiana Tech (7–4)	9.
10.	Tennessee State (3–0)	Alcorn State (2–0)	Colgate (3–1)	McNeese State (4–1)	Northeast Louisiana (5–1)	Murray State (6–1)	Northeast Louisiana (6–2)	Montana State (7–2)	Eastern Kentucky (7–3)	Arkansas State (7–3–1)	10.
11.	Marshall (3–0)	Southern (3–0)	Northern Iowa (4–0)	Northeast Louisiana (4–1)	Rhode Island (6–1)	Georgia Southern (7–1)	Colgate (5–2)	Georgia Southern (8–2)	Louisiana Tech (7–4)	New Hampshire (9–2)	11.
12.	Northern Arizona (3–0)	Colgate (2–1) т	Eastern Kentucky (3–1)	Colgate (3–1)	William & Mary (4–2)	Furman (5–2)	Arkansas State (5–3–1)	Eastern Kentucky (6–3) т	Arkansas State (6–3–1)	Richmond (7–3)	12.
13.	Alcorn State (2–0)	Western Illinois (3–0–1) т	Arkansas State (3–2) т	East Tennessee State (4–1)	Georgia Southern (6–1)	New Hampshire (6–1)	Boston University (6–2)	Middle Tennessee State (7–2) т	Richmond (6–3)	Murray State (9–2)	13.
14.	Illinois State (2–1)	Northern Arizona (3–1)	Middle Tennessee State (4–0) т	Rhode Island (5–1)	Boise State (4–2) т	Louisiana Tech (5–3)	Middle Tennessee State (6–2)	Arkansas State (5–3–1)	Murray State (8–2)	Western Carolina (8–3)	14.
15.	East Tennessee State (2–0) т	Marshall (3–1)	Northeast Louisiana (3–1) т	Boise State (3–2)	Boston University (5–1) т	Colgate (4–2)	Montana State (6–2)	The Citadel (6–3)	The Citadel (7–3)	Holy Cross (8–2)	15.
16.	Lehigh (2–0) т	Northern Iowa (3–1)	Rhode Island (4–1)	Lehigh (4–1) т	New Hampshire (4–2)	Northeast Louisiana (5–2)	Eastern Kentucky (5–3)	Murray State (7–2)	Northwestern State (7–3) т	Furman (8–3)	16.
17.	Arkansas State (2–1)	Eastern Kentucky (2–1)	Idaho State (3–1)	Georgia Southern (5–1)	Eastern Kentucky (4–2) т	UT Arlington (5–2)	Murray State (6–2)	Boise State (6–3)	Western Carolina (8–3) т	Chattanooga (6–4)	17.
18.	Southwest Texas State (2–0) т	Idaho State (2–1) т	Bethune–Cookman (3–1)	New Hampshire (4–1)	Louisiana Tech (4–3) т	Boston University (5–2)	Chattanooga (6–2)	Western Carolina (7–3)	William & Mary (6–4)	Northern Iowa (9–2)	18.
19.	Mississippi Valley State (2–0) т	Rhode Island (3–1) т	Lehigh (3–1)	Western Carolina (4–2)	East Tennessee State (4–2)	William & Mary (4–3)	Bethune–Cookman (6–2) т	Richmond (5–3)	Holy Cross (7–2) т	Delaware (8–3)	19.
20.	New Hampshire (2–0)	Chattanooga (2–1)	Delaware State (3–1)	Chattanooga (3–2)	Colgate (3–2)	Arkansas State (4–3–1)	The Citadel (5–3) т	Louisiana Tech (6–4) т	Chattanooga (6–3) т	McNeese State (7–3–1)	20.
21.							Northern Iowa (7–1) т	Delaware State (7–2) т			21.
	Week 1 Sept 18	Week 2 Sept 25	Week 3 Oct 2	Week 4 Oct 9	Week 5 Oct 16	Week 6 Oct 23	Week 7 Oct 30	Week 8 Nov 6	Week 9 Nov 13	Week 10 Nov 20	
		Dropped: 8 William & Mary; 10 Tennessee State; 14 Illinois State; 15 East Tennessee State; 16 Lehigh; 18 Southwest Texas State; 19 Mississippi Valley State; 20 New Hampshire	Dropped: 11 Southern; 13 Western Illinois; 14 Northern Arizona; 15 Marshall	Dropped: 11 Northern Iowa; 12 Eastern Kentucky; 17 Idaho State; 18 Bethune–Cookman; 20 Delaware State	Dropped: 9 Arkansas State; 16 Lehigh; 19 Western Carolina; 20 Chattanooga	Dropped: 17 Eastern Kentucky; 19 East Tennessee State	Dropped: 8 Boise State; 9 McNeese State; 12 Furman; 17 UT Arlington; 19 William & Mary	Dropped: 11 Colgate; 18 Chattanooga; 19 Bethune–Cookman; 20 Northern Iowa	Dropped: 7 Northeast Louisiana; 11 Georgia Southern; 17 Boise State; 20 Delaware State	Dropped: 1 Tennessee State; 15 The Citadel; 16 Northwestern State; 18 William & Mary	
