= 1984 Idaho Vandals football team =

American college football season

1984 Idaho Vandals football
- Conference: Big Sky Conference
- Record: 6–5 (4–3 Big Sky)
- Head coach: Dennis Erickson (3rd season)
- Offensive coordinator: Dan Cozzetto (2nd season)
- Defensive coordinator: John L. Smith (3rd season)
- Home stadium: Kibbie Dome

1984 Big Sky Conference football standings
	Conf.					Overall
Team	W		L		T	W		L		T
No. 2 Montana State $^	6	–	1	–	0	12	–	2	–	0
Nevada	5	–	2	–	0	7	–	4	–	0
Boise State	4	–	3	–	0	6	–	5	–	0
Idaho	4	–	3	–	0	6	–	5	–	0
Idaho State	4	–	3	–	0	5	–	6	–	0
Weber State	3	–	4	–	0	5	–	6	–	0
Northern Arizona	2	–	5	–	0	4	–	6	–	0
Montana	0	–	7	–	0	2	–	8	–	1
$ – Conference champion; ^ – NCAA Division I-AA playoff participant; Rankings from NCAA Division I-AA Poll

The 1984 Idaho Vandals football team represented the University of Idaho in the 1984 NCAA Division I-AA football season. The Vandals, led by third-year head coach Dennis Erickson, were members of the Big Sky Conference and played their home games at the Kibbie Dome, an indoor facility on campus in Moscow, Idaho.

After the departure of four-year starter QB Ken Hobart following the 1983 season, Idaho struggled with injuries and inexperience, falling to a 2–5 record before winning their last four. Led by quarterbacks Scott Linehan (redshirt sophomore) and Rick Sloan (junior, transfer from San Jose State), the Vandals finished 6–5 in the regular season and 4–3 in the Big Sky.

Although the 1984 season was less successful than the previous two, it marked the first time in nearly eight decades that the Vandals had three consecutive winning seasons in football; it was last accomplished in 1905.

Erickson's 23 wins in three seasons made him the winningest head coach in Vandal history, and he added nine more the next year. Defensive coordinator John L. Smith became the Vandals' head coach in 1989 and posted 53 wins in six seasons.

== Notable games ==
The Vandals defeated Oregon State of the Pac-10 41–22 in Moscow, but lost to upstart independent Eastern Washington in Spokane in the inaugural Governors' Cup, (EWU joined the Big Sky in 1987). Nevada continued its dominance over the Vandals, winning its sixth straight since joining the conference in 1979. Double-digit leads in the second half were squandered in both disappointing home losses to Montana State and Weber State.

Idaho defeated rival Boise State for the third consecutive year, a streak that extended to twelve straight in 1993. The 1984 game was the most lopsided to date, with the Vandals recording a 37–0 shutout on the road at Bronco Stadium in the season finale. In its seventeen years competing as a four-year school, Boise State had neither been shut out nor lost by more than 35 points. Senior Tim McMonigle wrapped up his third year as placekicker with thirteen points (3 FG, 4 PAT) to become the Vandals' all-time leading scorer at 224 points, passing 1960s fullback Ray McDonald.

== Division I-AA playoffs ==
Idaho missed the I-AA playoffs again, but returned in ten of the next eleven seasons, then departed for the Big West Conference after the 1995 season. In 1984, the mercurial Montana State Bobcats won the Big Sky title and the I-AA national title (MSU was 1–10 in 1983, 12–2 in 1984, 2–9 in 1985). The Bobcats were the only selection from the West in the 12-team playoffs. Idaho closed out the decade with conference titles in 1985, 1987, 1988, and 1989 (and runner-up in 1986), not missing the I-AA playoffs until 1991.

== Notable players ==
The 1984 team included two future NFL head coaches: quarterback Scott Linehan and offensive lineman Tom Cable.

== Schedule ==
Date	Time	Opponent	Site	Result	Attendance	Source
September 8	7:00 pm	Portland State (Div. II)*	Kibbie Dome; Moscow, ID	W 49–14	10,500	
September 15	1:00 pm	at Cal State Fullerton (Div. I-A)*	Santa Ana Stadium; Santa Ana, CA	L 7–28	5,650	
September 22	7:00 pm	Montana State	Kibbie Dome; Moscow, ID	L 28–34	11,600	
September 29	7:00 pm	Oregon State (Div. I-A)*	Kibbie Dome; Moscow, ID	W 41–22	10,700	
October 6	1:00 pm	at Nevada	Mackay Stadium; Reno, NV	L 17–23	9,525	
October 13	1:30 pm	Weber State^{†}	Kibbie Dome; Moscow, ID	L 37–40	13,700	
October 20	2:00 pm	at Eastern Washington*	Joe Albi Stadium; Spokane, WA	L 25–32	10,213	
October 27	1:00 pm	at Montana	Dornblaser Field; Missoula, MT (Little Brown Stein)	W 40–39	6,875	
November 3	7:00 pm	Northern Arizona	Kibbie Dome; Moscow, ID	W 37–9	7,500	
November 10	1:30 pm	Idaho State	Kibbie Dome; Moscow, ID (rivalry)	W 45–42	7,500	
November 17	12:30 pm	at Boise State	Bronco Stadium; Boise, UD (rivalry)	W 37–0	20,430	
*Non-conference game; ^{†}Homecoming; All times are in Pacific time

== Roster ==
1984 Idaho Vandals football team roster
Players
Coaches
Offense

Pos.	#	Name	Class
WR	1	Eric Yarber	Jr
QB	10	Scott Linehan	So
TE	12	Scott Auker	Jr
QB	14	Rick Sloan	Jr
QB	15	Darel Tracy	So
RB	23	Mike Shill	Sr
RB	26	Marlon Barrow	Sr
RB	32	Steve Jackson	Jr
WR	33	Brant Bengen	Fr
WR		Ricky Love	Sr
FL		Kevin Juma	Sr
G	55	Lance West	Sr
G		Tom Cable	Jr
G	64	Joe Smiley	Jr
C	68	Matt Watson	Jr
OT	77	Dave Thorsen	Sr
OL, DL		Mark Schlereth	Fr

Defense

Pos.	#	Name	Class
CB	2	Calvin Loveall	Sr
CB	4	Steve Simpson	Sr
SS	16	Mark Tidd	So
FS		Ernest Sanders	Fr
FS		Kevin Johnson	Fr
LB	38	Tom Hennessey	So
FS	42	Paul Ramsey	So
DE	44	Frank Moreno (injured)	Sr
LB		Nolan Harper	So
LB		Mike Cox	So
LB		Ed Rifilato	Sr
DE		Dan Hunter	Sr
DE		Ron Crick	Jr
DT		Pete Ruhl	So
DE		Troy Ballard	So
DT		John Andrews	Jr
DE	99	Sam Manoa	Sr

Special teams

Pos.	#	Name	Class
K	3	Tim McMonigle	Sr
P	7	Darin Magnuson	So

Head coach

- Dennis Erickson (3rd year)

Coordinators/assistant coaches

- Dan Cozzetto (OC)
- John L. Smith (DC)

Legend

- (C) Team captain
- (S) Suspended
- (I) Ineligible
- Injured
- Redshirt

== All-conference ==
Wide receiver Eric Yarber, center Matt Watson, and cornerback Calvin Loveall were named to the Big Sky all-conference team. Vandals on the second team were guard Lance West, tight end Scott Auker, running back Mike Shill, defensive end Sam Manoa, and placekicker Tim McMonigle. Loveall played in the USFL in the spring of 1985 with the Denver Gold, and later in the CFL and NFL.
