= Rhode Island Rams football =

Football program representing the University of Rhode Island

2026 Rhode Island Rams football team
- First season: 1895; 131 years ago
- Athletic director: Patrick Lyons
- Head coach: Jim Fleming; 13th season, 59–73 (.447)
- Location: Kingston, Rhode Island
- Stadium: Meade Stadium (capacity: 6,555)
- NCAA division: Division I FCS
- Conference: CAA Football
- Colors: Keaney blue, navy blue, and white
- All-time record: 446–646–43 (.412)

Conference championships
- Yankee: 1952, 1953, 1955, 1957, 1981, 1984, 1985 CAA: 2024, 2025
- Rivalries: Brown (rivalry); UConn (rivalry)
- Website: GoRhody.com

The Rhode Island Rams football program is the intercollegiate American football team for the University of Rhode Island located in the U.S. state of Rhode Island. The team competes in the NCAA Division I Football Championship Subdivision (FCS) and are members of the Coastal Athletic Association Football Conference (CAA Football). Rhode Island's first football team was fielded in 1895. The team plays its home games at the 6,555 seat Meade Stadium in Kingston, Rhode Island.

== Conference affiliations ==
Rhode Island has played as both an independent and conference-affiliated team.

- Independent / Athletic League of New England State Colleges (1895–1946)
- Yankee Conference (1947–1996)
- Atlantic 10 Conference (1997–2006)
- Coastal Athletic Association Football Conference (2007–present)

== Playoffs ==
=== NCAA Division I-AA/FCS ===
The Rams have appeared in the Division I-AA/FCS Playoffs five times with a combined playoff record of 4–5.

Year	Round	Opponent	Result
1981	Quarterfinals	Idaho State	L 0–51
1984	Quarterfinals; Semifinals	Richmond; Montana State	W 23–17; L 20–32
1985	First Round; Quarterfinals	Akron; Furman	W 35–27; L 15–59
2024	First Round; Second Round	Central Connecticut; Mercer	W 21–17; L 10–17
2025	First Round; Second Round	Central Connecticut; UC Davis	W 27–19; L 26–47

== Championships ==
=== Conference championships ===
The Rams have won eight conference championships, seven in the Yankee Conference and two in the Coastal Athletic Association, with their lone outright title coming in 2025.

The Yankee Conference titles were highlighted by two separate runs of numerous championships (four in five years during the 1950s and three in four years during the 1980s) and respective droughts between those run: a 24-year drought between titles in 1957 and 1981 and a 39-year drought between Rhode Island's final Yankee title in 1985 and their first CAA title in 2024.

Year	Conference	Coach	Overall record	Conference record
1952†	Yankee Conference (7)	Hal Kopp (3)	7–1	3–1
1953†	Yankee Conference (7)	Hal Kopp (3)	6–2	3–1
1955	Yankee Conference (7)	Hal Kopp (3)	6–1–2	4–0
1957†	Yankee Conference (7)	Herb Maack (1)	5–2–1	3–0–1
1981†	Yankee Conference (7)	Bob Griffin (3)	6–6	4–1
1984†	Yankee Conference (7)	Bob Griffin (3)	10–3	4–1
1985	Yankee Conference (7)	Bob Griffin (3)	10–3	5–0
2024†	Coastal Athletic Association (2)	Jim Fleming (2)	10–2	7–1
2025	Coastal Athletic Association (2)	Jim Fleming (2)	11-3	8–0

- † notes Co-championship

=== Divisional championships ===
The Rams have won one division title, in 1995: the Yankee Conference's New England Division.

Year	Division championship	Opponent	Result
1995	Yankee New England Division	Delaware	L 19–24

== Retired numbers ==
Rhode Island Rams retired numbers
No.	Player	Pos.	Tenure	No. ret.	Ref.
12	Tom Ehrhardt	1983–1985	QB	1996	

== Notable former players ==
- Derek Cassidy
- Chy Davidson
- Tom Ehrhardt
- Frank Ferrara
- Steve Furness
- Andy Gresh
- Chris Hixson
- Pat Narduzzi

=== Current NFL players ===
As of April 28, 2025, there are three former Rhode Island Rams player listed on team roster in the National Football League (NFL).

- Ajani Cornelius, right tackle, Dallas Cowboys
- Jordan Colbert, safety, Miami Dolphins
- Rex Sunahara, long snapper, Cleveland Browns

== Future non-conference opponents ==
Announced schedules as of October 13, 2026.

2026	2027	2028	2029	2030	2031
at Merrimack	at Boston College	Brown	at Brown	at West Virginia	at Brown
at Temple	at Brown	at Northern Illinois	Yale	Brown	
Brown	Merrimack				
at Yale					
