= Chris Hixson =

American football player (born 1974)

No. 5
- Position: Quarterback

Personal information
- Born: December 4, 1974 (age 51)
- Listed height: 6 ft 3 in (1.91 m)
- Listed weight: 215 lb (98 kg)

Career information
- College: Rhode Island
- NFL draft: 1997: undrafted

Career history
- Tallahassee Thunder (2001); Arizona Rattlers (2002–2003); Georgia Force (2004); Arizona Rattlers (2005)

Career AFL statistics
- Comp. / Att.: 97 / 159
- Passing yards: 1,027
- TD–INT: 17–11
- QB rating: 77.74
- Rushing TDs: 1
- Stats at ArenaFan.com

Chris Hixson (born December 4, 1974) is an American former professional football quarterback who played four seasons in the Arena Football League (AFL) with the Arizona Rattlers and Georgia Force. He played college football at the University of Rhode Island. He was also a member of the Tallahassee Thunder of the af2.

== Early life ==
Chris Hixson was born on December 4, 1974. He played for the Rhode Island Rams of the University of Rhode Island from 1993 to 1996. He was both the Yankee Conference and Eastern College Athletic Conference Rookie of the Year. He recorded college career totals of 691 completions on 1,179 passing attempts for 8,407 yards and 55 touchdowns. His completion and passing yard totals set school career records. Hixson's 58.6 career completion percentage was a school record as well. He was inducted into the University of Rhode Island's athletics hall of fame in 2017.

== Professional career ==
Hixson was a member of the Tallahassee Thunder of the af2 in 2001.

Hixson was signed by the AFL's Arizona Rattlers on March 18, 2002. He was waived on May 2, signed to the team's practice squad on May 14, promoted to the active roster on May 17, placed on injured reserve on May 30, and activated on June 15. Overall, he played in seven games for the Rattlers during the 2002 season, completing 23 of 37 passes (62.2%) for 252 yards, four touchdowns, and two interceptions while also rushing for one touchdown. Hixson re-signed with Arizona on November 8, 2002. He played in eight games, starting two, during the 2003 season, completing 59 of 101 passes (58.4%) for 654 yards, 12 touchdowns, and six interceptions.

Hixson signed with the Georgia Force of the AFL on May 6, 2004. He appeared in ten games for Georgia in 2004, recording 15 completions on 21 attempts (71.4%) for 121 yards, one touchdown, and three interceptions. He was released by the Force on October 15, 2004.

Hixson signed with the Arizona Rattlers on February 1, 2005. He played in one game for the Rattlers that season but did not record any statistics. He was released on February 8, 2005.

=== AFL statistics ===
Year	Team	Passing							Rushing		
Year	Team	Cmp	Att	Pct	Yds	TD	Int	Rtg	Att	Yds	TD
2002	Arizona	23	37	62.2	252	4	2	86.77	5	17	1
2003	Arizona	59	101	58.4	654	12	6	82.69	3	34	0
2004	Georgia	15	21	71.4	121	1	3	57.94	3	12	0
Career		97	159	61.0	1,027	17	11	77.74	11	63	1
