= 1984 Idaho State Bengals football team =

American college football season

1984 Idaho State Bengals football
- Conference: Big Sky Conference
- Record: 6–5 (4–3 Big Sky)
- Head coach: Jim Koetter (2nd season)
- Offensive scheme: West Coast
- Defensive coordinator: Jim Moller (2nd season)
- Base defense: 4–3
- Home stadium: ASISU Minidome

1984 Big Sky Conference football standings
	Conf.					Overall
Team	W		L		T	W		L		T
No. 2 Montana State $^	6	–	1	–	0	12	–	2	–	0
Nevada	5	–	2	–	0	7	–	4	–	0
Boise State	4	–	3	–	0	6	–	5	–	0
Idaho	4	–	3	–	0	6	–	5	–	0
Idaho State	4	–	3	–	0	5	–	6	–	0
Weber State	3	–	4	–	0	5	–	6	–	0
Northern Arizona	2	–	5	–	0	4	–	6	–	0
Montana	0	–	7	–	0	2	–	8	–	1
$ – Conference champion; ^ – NCAA Division I-AA playoff participant; Rankings from NCAA Division I-AA Poll

The 1984 Idaho State Bengals football team represented Idaho State University as a member of the Big Sky Conference during the 1984 NCAA Division I-AA football season. Led by second-year head coach Jim Koetter, the Bengals compiled an overall record of 6–5, with a mark of 4–3 in conference play, and finished tied for third in the Big Sky.

== Schedule ==
Date	Opponent	Rank	Site	Result	Attendance	Source
September 8	at UTEP*		Sun Bowl; El Paso, TX	L 14–16	35,711	
September 15	Chico State*		ASISU Minidome; Pocatello, ID	W 47–23	8,541	
September 22	Montana		ASISU Minidome; Pocatello, ID	W 43–3	8,024	
September 29	at Montana State	No. 18	Reno H. Sales Stadium; Bozeman, MT	W 22–6	11,117	
October 6	Boise State	No. 17	ASISU Minidome; Pocatello, ID	L 23–26	12,176	
October 13	at UNLV*		Sam Boyd Silver Bowl; Whitney, NV	W 20–33 (forfeit win)	17,755	
October 20	at Northern Arizona		Walkup Skydome; Flagstaff, AZ	W 29–15	13,100	
October 27	Eastern Washington*		ASISU Minidome; Pocatello, ID	L 23–41		
November 3	at Weber State		Wildcat Stadium; Ogden, UT	W 26–22		
November 10	at Idaho		Kibbie Dome; Moscow, ID (rivalry)	L 42–45	7,500	
November 17	Nevada		ASISU Minidome; Pocatello, ID	L 27–29	7,144	
*Non-conference game; Rankings from NCAA Division I-AA Football Committee Poll released prior to the game
