= Tom Cassese =

American football player (born 1946)

No. 45
- Positions: Defensive back, halfback

Personal information
- Born: April 7, 1946 (age 80); Queens, New York, U.S.
- Listed height: 6 ft 1 in (1.85 m)
- Listed weight: 198 lb (90 kg)

Career information
- High school: Holy Cross (Queens)
- College: C.W. Post
- NFL draft: 1967: 8th round, 191st overall pick

Career history
- Denver Broncos (1967); Montreal Alouettes (1969)
- Stats at Pro Football Reference

Tom Cassese (born April 7, 1946) is an American former professional football player who was a defensive back and halfback in the National Football League (NFL) and Canadian Football League (CFL). He played college football for the C.W. Post Pioneers. Cassese played professionally for the NFL's Denver Broncos in 1967 and for the CFL's Montreal Alouettes in 1969.
