= Evan Conti =

American-Israeli basketball head coach

Evan Perry Conti
Personal information
- Born: April 6, 1993 (age 33) Bayside, Queens, New York, U.S.
- Listed height: 6 ft 3 in (1.91 m)
- Listed weight: 208 lb (94 kg)

Career information
- High school: Holy Cross (Flushing, New York)
- College: Quinnipiac (2011–2015)
- NBA draft: 2015: undrafted
- Playing career: 2015–2018
- Position: Shooting guard / point guard

Career history

Playing
- 2015–2016: Hapoel Be'er Sheva
- 2016–2017: Hapoel Migdal Haemek
- 2018: Hapoel Afula

Coaching
- 2018–2019: NYIT (assistant)
- 2019–2020: NYIT
- 2021–2023: Saint Michael's (assistant)
- 2023–present: Saint Michael's (associate head coach)

Evan Perry Conti (born April 6, 1993) is the American head coach of the New York Institute of Technology Division II NCAA men's basketball team. He played three years of professional basketball in Israel, for Hapoel Be'er Sheva, Hapoel Migdal Haemek, and Hapoel Afula. He also won a gold medal in basketball with Team USA at the 2013 Maccabiah Games.

== High school ==
Conti is from Bayside, Queens, New York, and is Jewish.

Conti ranks fifth all-time at Holy Cross High School in Flushing, New York, with 1,120 career points; he also grabbed nearly 600 rebounds in his high school career for Coach Paul Gilvary's Knights. He averaged nearly 18 points, 10 rebounds, and five assists per game as a senior, earning Catholic High School Athletic Association (CHSAA) First Team recognition. The Knights had a 17–12 record that year.

He was selected to the Jewish Sports Review 2010–11 Boys High School All-America Basketball Team. NYHoops.com ranked Conti as the 13th-best player in New York City in March 2011.

== AAU ==
He also played AAU for the Rising Stars. The Rising Stars came in 8th in the country at the Division 1 Nationals in 2010.

== Maccabiah Games ==
Conti played with Team USA in the 2013 Maccabiah Games, winning a gold medal.

== College ==
In college, Conti played guard for Quinnipiac University from 2011 to 2015 on scholarship. Conti averaged 9.0 points, 4.8 rebounds, and 2.6 assists per game as a senior with Quinnipiac. He scored 26 points against Niagara.

== International career ==
He played three years of professional basketball in Israel, for Hapoel Be'er Sheva, Hapoel Migdal Haemek, and Hapoel Afula.

== Coaching career ==
Conti joined NYIT as an assistant coach in 2018. He became the interim head coach on February 23, 2019, coaching two games and winning his first victory over LIU Post. In May 2019, Conti was named the head coach at 26 years of age. Conti joined the Saint Michael's College Purple Knights as an assistant coach in July 2021, after NYIT discontinued all athletic programs in the wake of the COVID-19 pandemic. On September 8, 2023, Conti was elevated to associate head coach at Saint Michael's.
