= 1984 New Hampshire Wildcats football team =

American college football season

1984 New Hampshire Wildcats football
- Conference: Yankee Conference
- Record: 9–2 (3–2 Yankee)
- Head coach: Bill Bowes (13th season)
- Home stadium: Cowell Stadium

1984 Yankee Conference football standings
	Conf.					Overall
Team	W		L		T	W		L		T
No. 3 Rhode Island +^	4	–	1	–	0	10	–	3	–	0
No. 4 Boston University +^	4	–	1	–	0	9	–	3	–	0
No. 11 New Hampshire	3	–	2	–	0	9	–	2	–	0
Maine	2	–	3	–	0	5	–	6	–	0
Connecticut	1	–	4	–	0	3	–	8	–	0
UMass	1	–	4	–	0	3	–	8	–	0
+ – Conference co-champions; ^ – NCAA Division I-AA playoff participant; Rankings from NCAA Division I-AA Football Committee poll

The 1984 New Hampshire Wildcats football team was an American football team that represented the University of New Hampshire as a member of the Yankee Conference during the 1984 NCAA Division I-AA football season. In its 13th year under head coach Bill Bowes, the team compiled a 9–2 record (3–2 against conference opponents) and finished third out of six teams in the Yankee Conference.

== Schedule ==
Date	Opponent	Rank	Site	Result	Attendance	Source
September 8	Maine		Cowell Stadium; Durham, NH (rivalry)	W 21–13		
September 15	at Lafayette*		Fisher Field; Easton, PA	W 21–7	4,200	
September 22	No. 7 Boston University	No. 20	Cowell Stadium; Durham, NH	L 20–21		
September 29	at Dartmouth*		Memorial Field; Hanover, NH (rivalry)	W 38–10	11,667	
October 6	Connecticut		Cowell Stadium; Durham, NH	W 13–12	8,600	
October 13	Bucknell*	No. 18	Cowell Stadium; Durham, NH	W 17–16	15,230	
October 20	at Lehigh*	No. 16	Taylor Stadium; Bethlehem, PA	W 34–10	10,500	
October 27	at Northeastern*	No. 13	Parsons Field; Brookline, MA	W 13–2		
November 3	No. 6 Rhode Island	No. 8	Cowell Stadium; Durham, NH	W 14–12	14,335	
November 10	at No. 6 Holy Cross*	No. 4	Fitton Field; Worcester, MA	W 14–13	12,441	
November 17	at UMass	No. 4	McGuirk Stadium; Hadley, MA (rivalry)	L 10–14	5,621	
*Non-conference game; Rankings from NCAA Division I-AA Football Committee Poll released prior to the game
