= 1984 UMass Minutemen football team =

American college football season

1984 UMass Minutemen football
- Conference: Yankee Conference
- Record: 3–8 (1–4 Yankee)
- Head coach: Bob Stull (1st season)
- Defensive coordinator: Jim Reid (7th season)
- Home stadium: Warren McGuirk Alumni Stadium

1984 Yankee Conference football standings
	Conf.					Overall
Team	W		L		T	W		L		T
No. 3 Rhode Island +^	4	–	1	–	0	10	–	3	–	0
No. 4 Boston University +^	4	–	1	–	0	9	–	3	–	0
No. 11 New Hampshire	3	–	2	–	0	9	–	2	–	0
Maine	2	–	3	–	0	5	–	6	–	0
Connecticut	1	–	4	–	0	3	–	8	–	0
UMass	1	–	4	–	0	3	–	8	–	0
+ – Conference co-champions; ^ – NCAA Division I-AA playoff participant; Rankings from NCAA Division I-AA Football Committee poll

The 1984 UMass Minutemen football team represented the University of Massachusetts Amherst in the 1984 NCAA Division I-AA football season as a member of the Yankee Conference. The team was coached by Bob Stull and played its home games at Warren McGuirk Alumni Stadium in Hadley, Massachusetts. The stadium had been called Alumni Stadium from its opening in 1965 until the November 3, 1984, game against Connecticut, when it was officially named for Warren McGuirk, who was the UMass Athletic Director from 1948 to 1972. UMass finished the season with a record of 3–8 overall and 1–4 in conference play.

== Schedule ==
Date	Opponent	Site	Result	Attendance	Source
September 1	Ball State*	Alumni Stadium; Hadley, MA	W 26–10	8,946	
September 8	Lehigh*	Alumni Stadium; Hadley, MA	L 14–21	11,871	
September 22	at No. 5 Holy Cross*	Fitton Field; Worcester, MA	L 7–35	17,641	
September 29	Northeastern*	Alumni Stadium; Hadley, MA	W 3–0	8,633	
October 6	at No. 16 Rhode Island	Meade Stadium; Kingston, RI	L 19–20	10,227	
October 13	Richmond*	Alumni Stadium; Hadley, MA	L 7–24	8,229	
October 20	at Maine	Alumni Field; Orono, ME	L 7–20	7,200	
October 27	at No. 18 Boston University	Nickerson Field; Boston, MA	L 21–31	3,161	
November 3	Connecticut^{†}	McGuirk Stadium; Hadley, MA (rivalry)	L 16–21	13,031	
November 10	at Delaware*	Delaware Stadium; Newark, DE	L 14–27	13,367	
November 17	No. 4 New Hampshire	McGuirk Stadium; Hadley, MA (rivalry)	W 14–10	5,621	
*Non-conference game; ^{†}Homecoming; Rankings from NCAA Division I-AA Football Committee Poll released prior to the game
