= 1984 Montana Grizzlies football team =

American college football season

1984 Montana Grizzlies football
- Conference: Big Sky Conference
- Record: 2–8–1 (0–7 Big Sky)
- Head coach: Larry Donovan (5th season)
- Offensive coordinator: Joe Glenn (3rd season)
- Home stadium: Dornblaser Field

1984 Big Sky Conference football standings
	Conf.					Overall
Team	W		L		T	W		L		T
No. 2 Montana State $^	6	–	1	–	0	12	–	2	–	0
Nevada	5	–	2	–	0	7	–	4	–	0
Boise State	4	–	3	–	0	6	–	5	–	0
Idaho	4	–	3	–	0	6	–	5	–	0
Idaho State	4	–	3	–	0	5	–	6	–	0
Weber State	3	–	4	–	0	5	–	6	–	0
Northern Arizona	2	–	5	–	0	4	–	6	–	0
Montana	0	–	7	–	0	2	–	8	–	1
$ – Conference champion; ^ – NCAA Division I-AA playoff participant; Rankings from NCAA Division I-AA Poll

The 1984 Montana Grizzlies football team represented the University of Montana in the 1984 NCAA Division I-AA football season as a member of the Big Sky Conference (Big Sky). The Grizzlies were led by fifth-year head coach Larry Donovan, played their home games at Dornblaser Field and finished the season with a record of two wins, eight losses and one tie (2–8–1, 0–7 Big Sky).

== Schedule ==
Date	Opponent	Site	Result	Attendance	Source
September 8	Abilene Christian*	Dornblaser Field; Missoula, MT	W 42–28	6,565	
September 14	at Portland State*	Civic Stadium; Portland, OR	W 17–16	3,035	
September 22	at Idaho State	ASISU Minidome; Pocatello, ID	L 3–43	8,024	
September 29	at Weber State	Wildcat Stadium; Ogden, UT	L 14–47	10,069	
October 6	Northern Arizona	Dornblaser Field; Missoula, MT	L 18–24	7,332	
October 13	Eastern Washington*	Dornblaser Field; Missoula, MT (rivalry)	T 14–14	5,500	
October 20	at No. 14 Boise State	Bronco Stadium; Boise, ID	L 7–35	17,282	
October 27	Idaho	Dornblaser Field; Missoula, MT (rivalry)	L 39–40	6,875	
November 3	No. 15 Montana State	Dornblaser Field; Missoula, MT (rivalry)	L 24–34	12,500	
November 10	at Nevada	Mackay Stadium; Reno, NV	L 28–31	6,845	
November 17	vs. Army*	Olympic Memorial Stadium; Tokyo, Japan (Mirage Bowl)	L 31–45	60,000	
*Non-conference game; Rankings from NCAA Division I-AA Football Committee Poll released prior to the game
