= 1984 Rhode Island Rams football team =

American college football season

1984 Rhode Island Rams football

Yankee Conference co-champion Lambert Cup winner

NCAA Division I-AA Semifinal, L 20–32 at Montana State
- Conference: Yankee Conference

Ranking
- Coaches: No. 3
- Record: 10–3 (4–1 Yankee)
- Head coach: Bob Griffin (9th season)
- Offensive coordinator: Niles Nelson (4th season)
- Defensive coordinator: Pete Adrian (9th season)
- Home stadium: Meade Stadium

1984 Yankee Conference football standings
	Conf.					Overall
Team	W		L		T	W		L		T
No. 3 Rhode Island +^	4	–	1	–	0	10	–	3	–	0
No. 4 Boston University +^	4	–	1	–	0	9	–	3	–	0
No. 11 New Hampshire	3	–	2	–	0	9	–	2	–	0
Maine	2	–	3	–	0	5	–	6	–	0
Connecticut	1	–	4	–	0	3	–	8	–	0
UMass	1	–	4	–	0	3	–	8	–	0
+ – Conference co-champions; ^ – NCAA Division I-AA playoff participant; Rankings from NCAA Division I-AA Football Committee poll

The 1984 Rhode Island Rams football team was an American football team that represented the University of Rhode Island in the Yankee Conference during the 1984 NCAA Division I-AA football season. In their ninth season under head coach Bob Griffin, the Rams compiled a 10–3 record (4–1 against conference opponents), tied for the conference championship, and advanced to the Division I-AA playoffs where they lost to Montana State in the semifinals.

Quarterback Tom Ehrhardt, a junior transfer from C. W. Post, completed 308 of 536 passes (57.5%) for 3,870 yards and 36 touchdowns. He was known as "Ehr Force", and Rhode Island's offensive line was called the "Ehr National Guard." At the end of the season, he was named the Yankee Conference offensive player of the year.

Seven Rhode Island players received first-team honors on the 1984 Yankee Conference all-star team: Ehrhardt; wide receiver Dameon Reilly; tight end Brian Forster; guard Greg Sturgis; defensive lineman Charles Bounty; linebacker Mark Brockwell; and defensive back Tony Hill. Other key players included running backs Rich Kelley and Mike Sanders.

The team played its home games at Meade Stadium in Kingston, Rhode Island.

== Schedule ==
Date	Opponent	Rank	Site	Result	Attendance	Source
September 1	Howard*		Meade Stadium; Kingston, RI	W 31–21	3,520	
September 8	Lafayette*		Meade Stadium; Kingston, RI	W 31–10	6,858	
September 15	at Holy Cross*		Fitton Field; Worcester, MA	L 0–19	9,911	
September 22	at Maine		Alumni Field; Orono, ME	W 27–0	8,000	
September 29	at Brown*	No. T–18	Brown Stadium; Providence, RI (rivalry)	W 34–13	12,523	
October 6	UMass	No. 16	Meade Stadium; Kingston, RI	W 20–19	10,227	
October 13	at Northeastern*	No. 14	Parsons Field; Brookline, MA	W 30–22	4,650	
October 20	No. T–14 Boston University^{†}	No. 11	Meade Stadium; Kingston, RI	W 22–7	13,052	
October 27	at Lehigh*	No. 6	Taylor Stadium; Bethlehem, PA	W 24–16	12,500	
November 3	at No. 8 New Hampshire	No. 6	Cowell Stadium; Durham, NH	L 12–14	14,335	
November 17	at Connecticut	No. T–6	Memorial Stadium; Storrs, CT (rivalry)	W 29–19	4,799	
December 1	No. 12 Richmond*	No. 3	Meade Stadium; Kingston, RI (NCAA Division I-AA Quarterfinal)	W 23–17	10,446	
December 8	at No. 2 Montana State*	No. 3	Reno H. Sales Stadium; Bozeman, MT (NCAA Division I-AA Semifinal)	L 20–32	12,697	
*Non-conference game; ^{†}Homecoming; Rankings from NCAA Division I-AA Football Committee Poll released prior to the game
