= Holy Cross High School (Queens) =

High school in Flushing, Queens

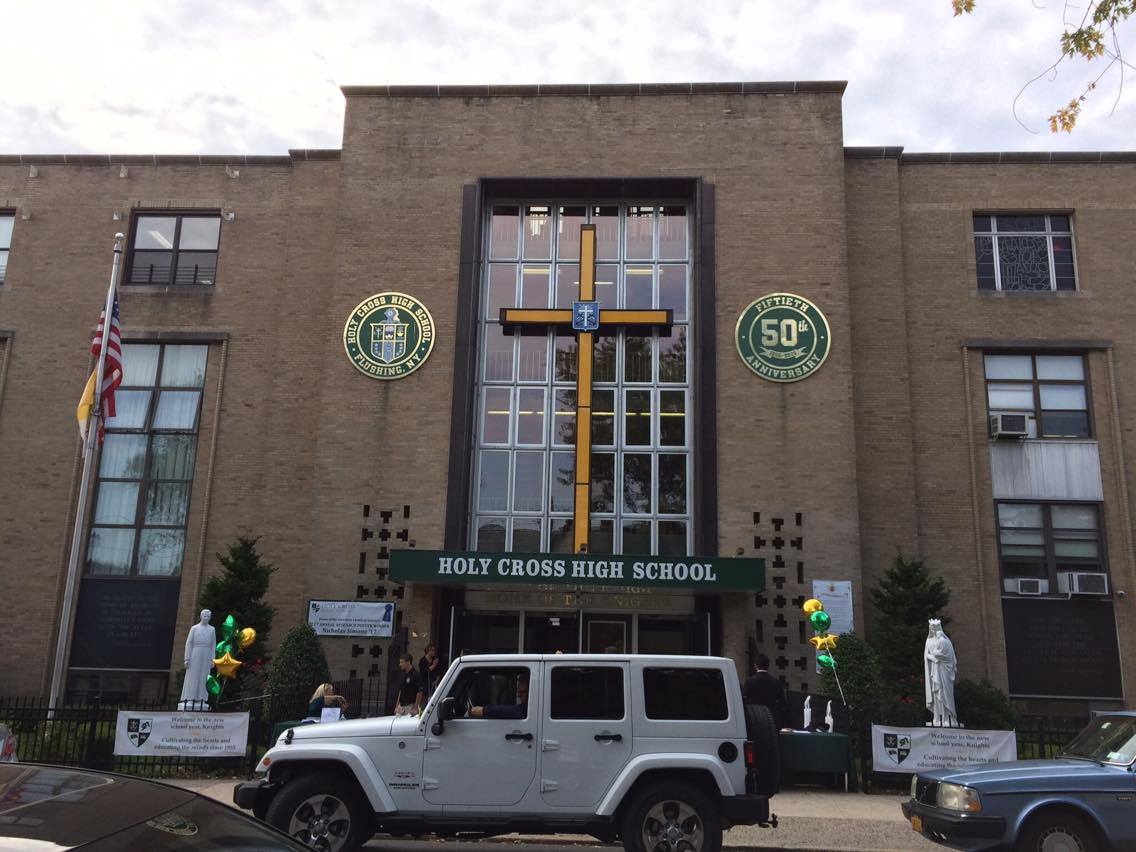

Location
- 26-20 Francis Lewis Boulevard; New York City (Flushing, Queens), New York 11358; United States; 40°46′16″N 73°47′43″W

Information
- Motto: Abe crux spes unica
- Religious affiliations: Roman Catholic; Holy Cross
- Established: 1955
- President: Mark Mongelluzzo
- Principal: Dr. Weedens E. Blanchard, ED.D. ‘89
- Grades: 9–12
- Colors: Green and Gold
- Athletics: 12 sports
- Athletics conference: CHSAA
- Mascot: Knight
- Nickname: Cross
- Team name: Knights
- Rival: St. Francis Preparatory School
- Accreditation: Middle States Association of Colleges and Schools
- Newspaper: Lance
- Website: www.holycrosshs.org

Holy Cross High School is a Catholic high school in Flushing, Queens, New York City. Formerly a boys' school, the school began to admit girls in the 2018–19 academic year. Founded in 1955, Holy Cross is located in the Diocese of Brooklyn and sponsored by the Brothers of Holy Cross.

== Athletics ==
The school's athletic team is the Holy Cross Knights and the school's athletic archrival is the St. Francis Preparatory School Terriers. Since they are both located on Francis Lewis Boulevard approximately 2.5 miles (4.0 km) apart, when they play each other the game is called the Battle of the Boulevard.

== History ==
The proposal for the first all-boys Catholic high school in Queens was developed at the University of Notre Dame in the early 1940s by Msgr. Edmund Reilly, pastor of St. Thomas Aquinas Church (Flatlands) and Rev. Frederick Schulte, CSC. The Brothers of Holy Cross were invited to come and work at the Boys' Department of St. Thomas Aquinas in 1944 and St. Francis of Assisi in 1947. Shortly afterwards, the Brothers were invited to establish a high school in Queens. In September 1955, Holy Cross High School opened despite the school building being unfinished. Shortly afterwards with the support of parents and other involved parties, the Brothers of the Holy Cross assumed operational control of the school. The mission of the school is to educate young people within the traditions of Catholicism and to prepare them for life after graduating. In 2017, the school announced its intention to become co-educational and admit girls for the first time. The school became co-ed starting in fall 2018. Other schools in the United States operated by the Congregation of Holy Cross had already been going co-educational in prior years. In 2025, the school was expanded for the first time in its history with the construction of the new Arts, Technology, and Athletics Center. The additional building is expected to open in 2026.

== Academics ==
Holy Cross is a college preparatory school with four levels of college preparatory courses. The school offers the Blessed Father Basil Moreau Honors Program and the Science Research Program. When the school was first opened, they had an industrial arts program which included a print shop which printed, among other things, the school newspaper "The Lance". This program was discontinued during the principalship of Brother Aubert Harrigan, C.S.C. in favor of expanding the mission and purpose of the school to be a college preparatory school. It was during the John McGovern tenure (75-81) that the governance structure of the school was changed from a completely religious (CSC) board of trustees to a two-pronged board structure consisting of an ownership (Congregation of Holy Cross) board working in collaboration with a lay board of Directors (Executive Committee) appointed by the ownership group. It was during the McGovern tenure that the school reached its highest enrollment (1400+). For many years McGovern promoted this structure annually at the convention of the National Catholic Educational Association where he also served in later years as National Public Policy Research Associate.

== Religious life ==
Holy Cross offers intellectual pursuits such as Campus Ministry. The Holy Cross Brothers still staff the school in various capacities; however as a result of governance changes instituted during the McGovern tenure in collaboration with provincial leadership, the school is operating under a "sponsorship" model with the Brothers of Holy Cross constituting the ownership board and a local Board of Directors constituting the management board. The religious philosophy is based on the mission of The Brothers of Holy Cross which were founded in Le Mans, France in 1835.

== Notable alumni ==
=== Basketball ===
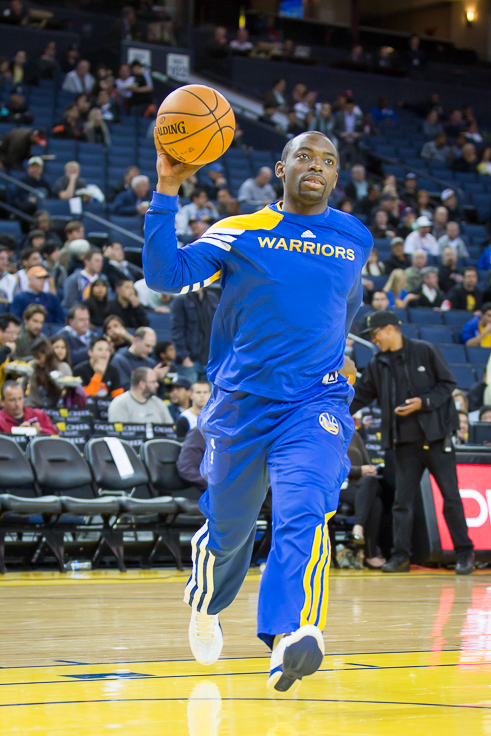
Charles Jenkins with the Golden State Warriors in 2012

- Jermaine Bishop, American professional basketball player in Puerto Rico for Leones De Ponce. (Class of 2015)
- Derrick Chievous, former basketball player for the Houston Rockets and Cleveland Cavaliers of the NBA (Class of 1984)
- Evan Conti (born 1993), former basketball player and coach (Class of 2011)
- Charles Jenkins, former basketball player for the Philadelphia 76ers of the NBA, attended his freshmen year. (Class of 2007)
- Sylven Landesberg, American professional basketball player in Israel for Maccabi Tel Aviv (Class of 2008)
- Bob McIntyre, former basketball player for the New Jersey Americans and New York Nets of the ABA (Class of 1962)
- Kyle O'Quinn, American basketball player for Sichuan Jinqiang Blue Whales, transferred after sophomore year. (Class of 2008)
- Mike Riordan, former basketball player for the New York Knicks and Baltimore/Capitol/Washington Bullets of the NBA; 1970 NBA Championship (NY Knicks); 1972–73 NBA All Defensive 2nd Team (Class of 1964)
- Billy Schaeffer, former basketball player for the New York Nets and Virginia Squires of the ABA; 1974 ABA Championship (NY Nets) (Class of 1969)
- Kevin Stacom, former basketball player for the Boston Celtics, Indiana Pacers and Milwaukee Bucks of the NBA (Class of 1969)

=== Football ===
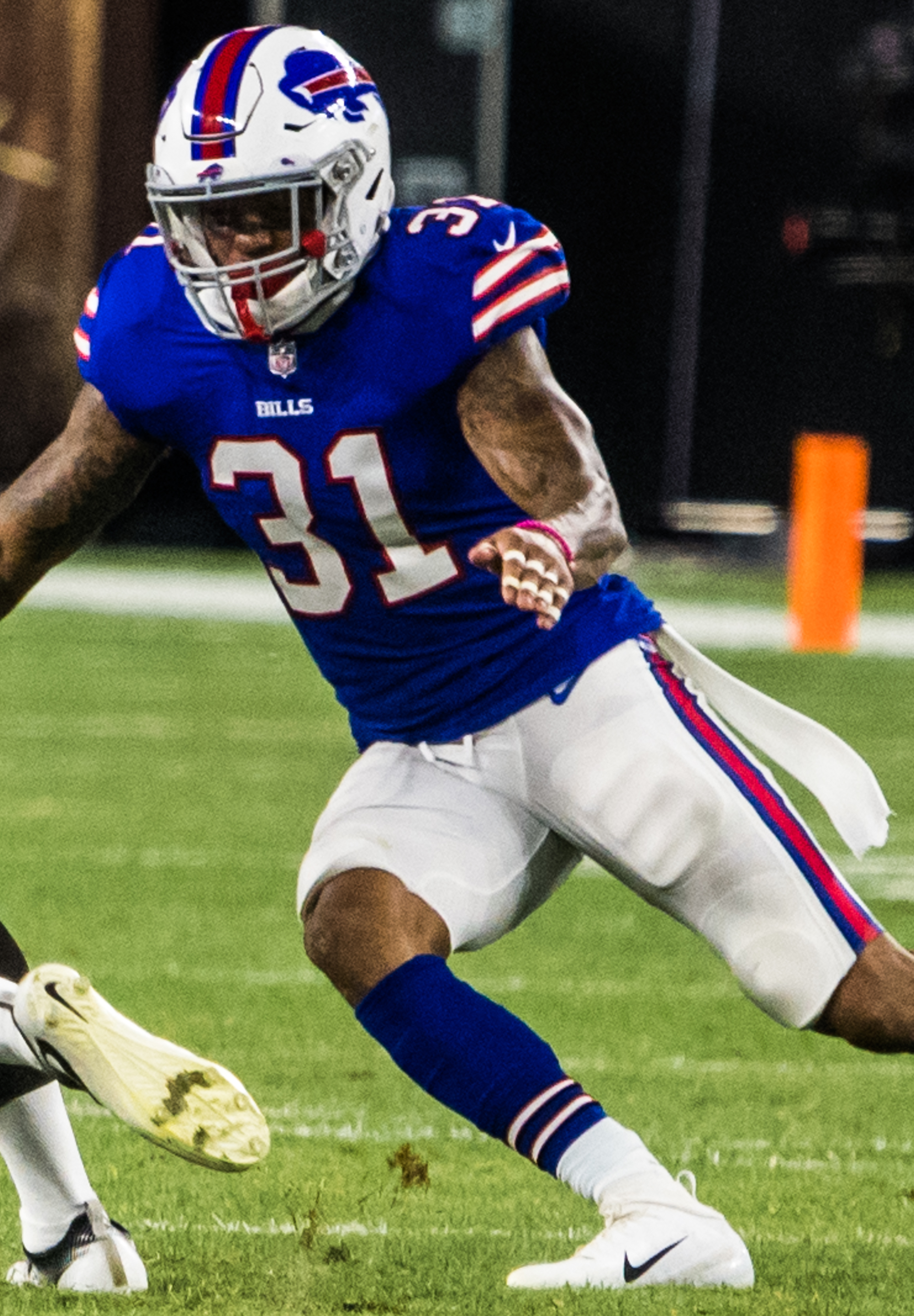
Dean Marlowe with the Buffalo Bills in 2018

- Devon Cajuste, former NFL football player
- Tom Cassese, former NFL and CFL football player
- Tom Ehrhardt, former NFL football player
- Dennis Golden, former college coach and president
- Devin Grant, football player
- Dean Marlowe, former NFL football player
- Kevin Ogletree, former NFL football player
- John O'Leary, former CFL football player

=== Baseball ===
- Pete Koegel, former MLB baseball player
- Dave Valle, former MLB baseball player

=== Soccer ===
- Marcos Lugris, former professional soccer player NY Cosmos/Dallas Sidekicks/Houston Dynamos-Puerto Rico National Team

=== Other notables ===
- John Megna, played Dill in the original movie production of "To Kill A Mockingbird"
- Mike Repole, co-founder of Glaceau (maker of Vitaminwater)
- Mike Star - American actor
