= Dean Marlowe =

American football player (born 1992)

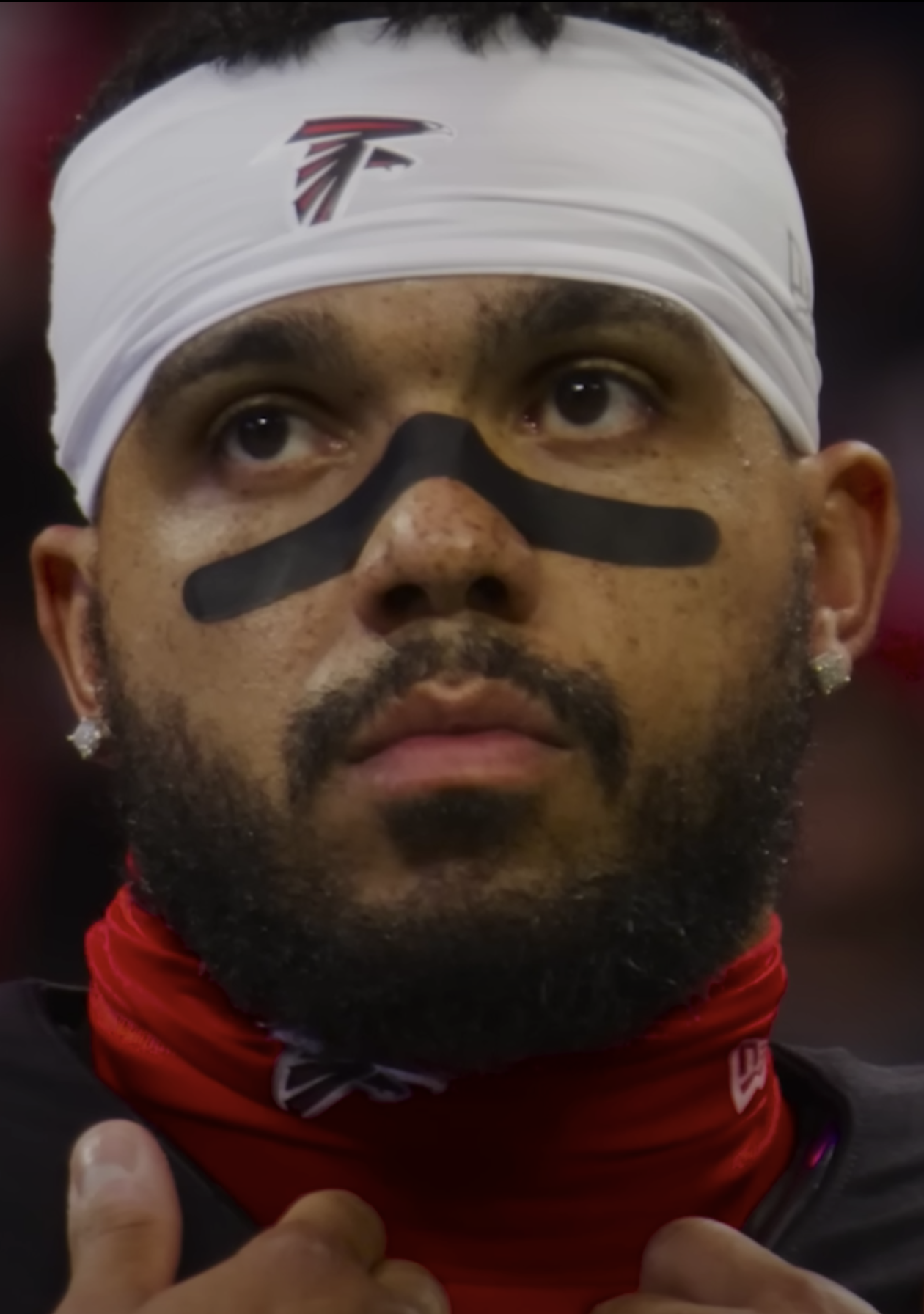
- Marlowe with the Atlanta Falcons in 2022

Oklahoma State Cowboys
- Title: Defensive quality control coach

Personal information
- Born: July 25, 1992 (age 34); Queens, New York, U.S.
- Listed height: 6 ft 1 in (1.85 m)
- Listed weight: 205 lb (93 kg)

Career information
- Position: Safety (No. 29, 31, 21, 20)
- High school: Holy Cross (Queens)
- College: James Madison (2011–2014)
- NFL draft: 2015: undrafted

Career history

Playing
- Carolina Panthers (2015–2016); Buffalo Bills (2017–2020); Detroit Lions (2021); Atlanta Falcons (2022); Buffalo Bills (2022); Los Angeles Chargers (2023)

Coaching
- Oklahoma State (2025–present) Defensive quality control coach

Awards and highlights
- 2× First-team All-CAA (2012, 2014); Second-team All-CAA (2013)

Career NFL statistics
- Total tackles: 159
- Fumble recoveries: 2
- Pass deflections: 7
- Interceptions: 2
- Sacks: 2.5
- Stats at Pro Football Reference

Dean Marlowe (born July 25, 1992) is an American former professional football player who was a safety in the National Football League (NFL). He was signed by the Carolina Panthers as an undrafted free agent following the 2015 NFL draft. He played college football for the James Madison Dukes. Marlowe currently works as a defensive quality control coach at Oklahoma State.

== Early life ==
As a senior, Marlowe played quarterback and safety on the football team at Holy Cross High School. He along with Stanford wide receiver Devon Cajuste helped lead the Knights to the CHSAA Semi final game where they lost to the third-ranked team in the state St. Anthony's by a score of 27–7. Holy Cross finished the season ranked 18th in the state. Rivals gave him a two-star rating when he signed with James Madison University.

== College career ==
Marlowe played for the James Madison Dukes from 2011 to 2014. He was redshirted in 2010. He recorded career totals of 326 tackles, 12 interceptions and 30 passes defended in 48 games played. He earned First-team All-Colonial Athletic Association (CAA) honors in 2012 and 2014. Marlowe also garnered Second-team All-CAA recognition in 2013 and Third-team honors in 2011.

== Professional career ==
Pre-draft measurables
Height	Weight	Arm length	Hand span	Wingspan	40-yard dash	10-yard split	20-yard split	20-yard shuttle	Three-cone drill	Vertical jump	Broad jump	Bench press
6 ft 1 1/2 in (1.87 m)	203 lb (92 kg)	31 in (0.79 m)	8 3/4 in (0.22 m)	6 ft 2 1/8 in (1.88 m)	4.58 s	1.62 s	2.68 s	4.18 s	7.00 s	33.5 in (0.85 m)	9 ft 6 in (2.90 m)	16 reps
All values from NFL Combine

=== Carolina Panthers ===
Following the 2015 NFL draft, Marlowe was signed by the Carolina Panthers as an undrafted free agent. He made the team's 53-man roster on September 5, 2015.

On February 7, 2016, Marlowe's Panthers played in Super Bowl 50. He was inactive for the game as the Panthers fell to the Denver Broncos by a score of 24–10.

On September 20, 2016, Marlowe was placed on injured reserve with a hamstring injury.

On August 8, 2017, Marlowe was waived/injured by the Panthers and placed on injured reserve. He was released on August 15, 2017.

=== Buffalo Bills (first stint) ===
On December 5, 2017, Marlowe was signed to the practice squad of the Buffalo Bills. He signed a reserve/future contract with the Bills on January 8, 2018.

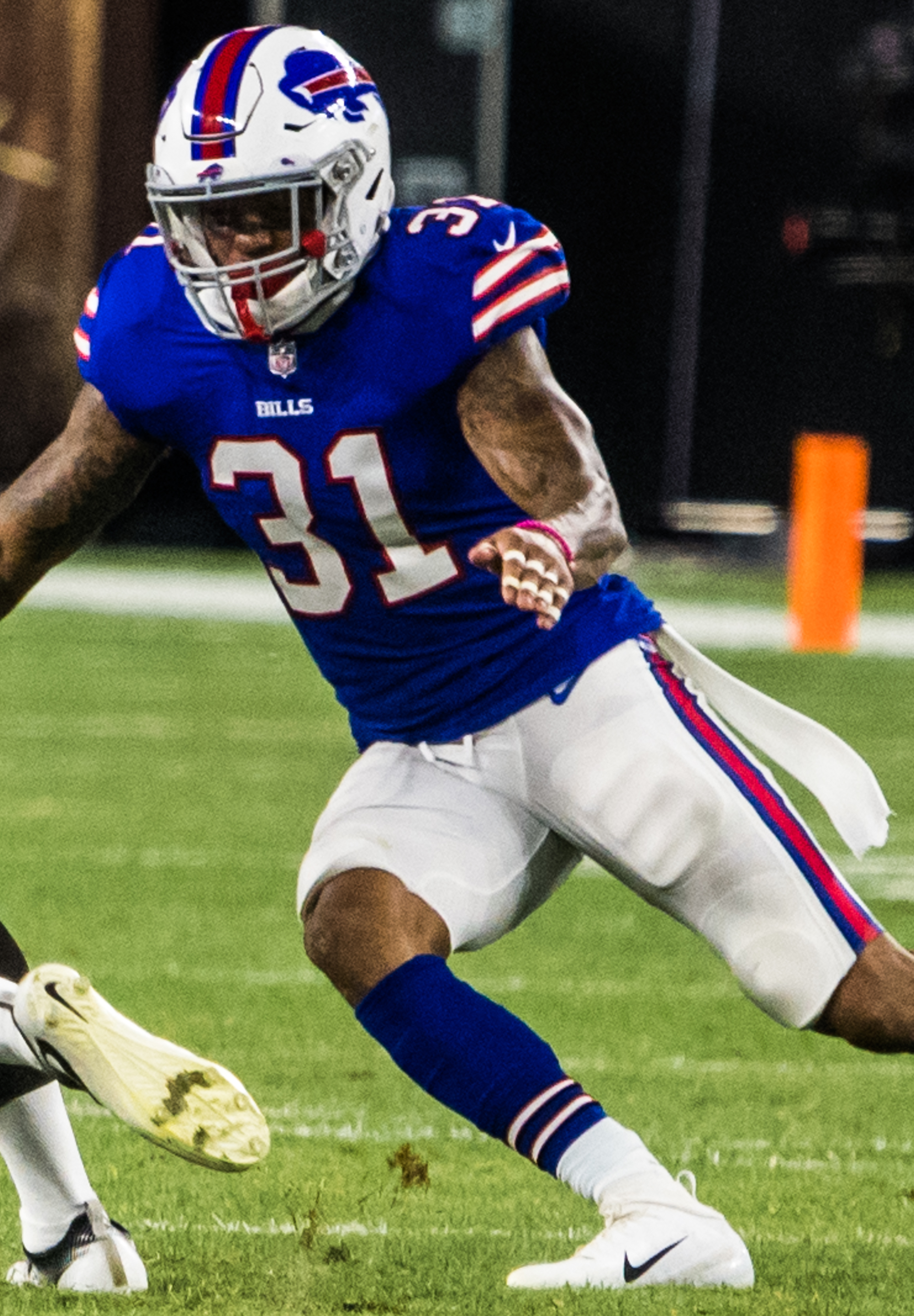
Marlowe with the Buffalo Bills in 2018

On September 1, 2018, Marlowe was waived by the Bills and was signed to the practice squad the next day. He was promoted to the active roster on October 6, 2018. He was waived on October 9, 2018 and was re-signed to the practice squad. He was promoted back to the active roster on December 12, 2018.

On March 26, 2020, Marlowe re-signed with the Bills. He was released as a part of final roster cuts on September 5, 2020, but re-signed again the next day following some roster adjustments. In Week 8 of the 2020 season against the New England Patriots, Marlowe recovered a fumble forced by teammate Justin Zimmer on Cam Newton late in the fourth quarter to secure a 24–21 Bills' win. Marlowe was placed on the reserve/COVID-19 list by the team on November 14, 2020, and activated on November 19. In Week 16 against the New England Patriots on Monday Night Football, Marlowe recorded his first career sack on Cam Newton during the 38–9 win. In Week 17 against the Miami Dolphins, Marlowe intercepted two passes thrown by Tua Tagovailoa during the 56–26 win.

=== Detroit Lions ===
On April 8, 2021, Marlowe signed with the Detroit Lions. He played in 16 games with nine starts, recording 67 tackles and two passes defensed.

=== Atlanta Falcons ===
On March 31, 2022, Marlowe signed a one-year contract with the Atlanta Falcons.

=== Buffalo Bills (second stint) ===
On November 1, 2022, the Falcons traded Marlowe to the Bills in exchange for a 2023 7th-round draft pick.

On May 22, 2023, Marlowe re-signed with the Bills. He was released on August 29.

=== Los Angeles Chargers ===
On August 31, 2023, Marlowe signed with the practice squad of the Los Angeles Chargers. He was promoted to the active roster on September 30.

== Professional statistics ==
Legend
**Bold**	Career High

Season				Tackling				Fumbles			Interceptions					
Year	Team	GP	GS	Comb	Solo	Asst	Sack	FF	FR	Yds	Int	Yds	Avg	Lng	TD	PD
2015	CAR	4	0	0	0	0	0.0	0	0	0	0	0	0	0	0	0
2016	CAR	1	0	0	0	0	0.0	0	0	0	0	0	0	0	0	0
2017	BUF	Did not play due to injury														
2018	BUF	2	1	5	4	1	0.0	0	0	0	0	0	0	0	0	1
2019	BUF	9	2	11	10	1	0.0	0	0	0	0	0	0	0	0	1
2020	BUF	15	4	22	16	6	**1.5**	0	**1**	0	**2**	**39**	**19.5**	**23**	0	**3**
2021	DET	**16**	**9**	**67**	**37**	**30**	0.0	0	**1**	0	0	0	0	0	0	2
2022	ATL	8	1	11	7	4	0.0	0	0	0	0	0	0	0	0	0
2022	BUF	4	1	3	3	0	0.0	0	0	0	0	0	0	0	0	0
2023	LAC	16	4	40	32	8	1.0	0	0	0	0	0	0	0	0	0
Career		75	22	159	109	50	2.5	0	2	0	2	39	19.5	23	0	7

== Coaching career ==
On January 15, 2025, Marlowe was hired as a defensive quality control coach at Oklahoma State.
