= 1984 Maine Black Bears football team =

American college football season

1984 Maine Black Bears football
- Conference: Yankee Conference
- Record: 5–6 (2–3 Yankee)
- Head coach: Ron Rogerson (4th season)
- Offensive coordinator: Steve Tosches (2nd season)
- Captain: Gary Hufnagle
- Home stadium: Alumni Field

1984 Yankee Conference football standings
	Conf.					Overall
Team	W		L		T	W		L		T
No. 3 Rhode Island +^	4	–	1	–	0	10	–	3	–	0
No. 4 Boston University +^	4	–	1	–	0	9	–	3	–	0
No. 11 New Hampshire	3	–	2	–	0	9	–	2	–	0
Maine	2	–	3	–	0	5	–	6	–	0
Connecticut	1	–	4	–	0	3	–	8	–	0
UMass	1	–	4	–	0	3	–	8	–	0
+ – Conference co-champions; ^ – NCAA Division I-AA playoff participant; Rankings from NCAA Division I-AA Football Committee poll

The 1984 Maine Black Bears football team was an American football team that represented the University of Maine as a member of the Yankee Conference during the 1984 NCAA Division I-AA football season. In their fourth season under head coach Ron Rogerson, the Black Bears compiled a 5–6 record (2–3 against conference opponents) and finished fourth out of six teams in the Yankee Conference. Gary Hufnagle was the team captain.

== Schedule ==
Date	Opponent	Site	Result	Attendance	Source
September 8	at New Hampshire	Cowell Stadium; Durham, NH	L 13–21		
September 15	at Richmond*	UR Stadium; Richmond, VA	L 13–30		
September 22	Rhode Island	Alumni Field; Orono, ME	L 0–27	8,000	
September 29	at No. 8 Boston University*	Nickerson Field; Boston, MA	L 10–27	5,533	
October 6	Lafayette*	Alumni Field; Orono, ME	W 22–20	5,000	
October 13	at Delaware*	Delaware Stadium; Newark, DE	L 7–37	19,426	
October 20	UMass	Alumni Field; Orono, ME	W 20–7		
October 27	at Connecticut	Memorial Stadium; Storrs, CT	W 13–10 ^{OT}		
November 3	Northeastern*	Alumni Field; Orono, ME	W 20–17		
November 10	at Howard	Washington, DC	W 27–23		
November 17	No T–19 Holy Cross	Alumni Field; Orono, ME	L 7–24	3,000	
*Non-conference game; Rankings from NCAA Division I-AA Football Committee Poll released prior to the game
