= Tom Jackson (American football, born 1948) =

American football player and coach (1948–2025)

Biographical details
- Born: July 8, 1948; Scotch Plains, New Jersey, U.S.
- Died: January 30, 2025 (aged 76); Florida, U.S.

Playing career
- 1967–1970: Penn State
- Position: Guard

Coaching career (HC unless noted)
- 1978–1982: Connecticut (OL)
- 1983–1993: Connecticut

Head coaching record
- Overall: 62–57

Accomplishments and honors

Championships
- 3 Yankee (1983, 1986, 1989)

Awards
- Yankee Conference Coach of the Year (1986); UPI New England Coach of the Year (1986)

Tom Jackson (July 8, 1948 – January 30, 2025) was an American college football player and coach.

From Scotch Plains, New Jersey, Jackson played collegiately from 1967 to 1970 for the Penn State Nittany Lions. Recruited as a part of Joe Paterno's first recruiting class, Jackson earned All-East honors as a guard in 1968 and 1969. Jackson served as the head football coach for the Connecticut Huskies from 1983 to 1993, compiling a record of 62–57. He resigned on November 17, 1993. Prior to taking over as head coach at Connecticut in 1983, Jackson served as the offensive line coach there.

Jackson died in Florida on January 30, 2025, at the age of 76.

== Head coaching record ==
| Year | Team | Overall | Conference | Standing | Bowl/playoffs |
|---|---|---|---|---|---|
Connecticut Huskies (Yankee Conference) (1983–1993)
| 1983 | Connecticut | 5–6 | 4–1 | T–1st | |
| 1984 | Connecticut | 3–8 | 1–4 | T–5th | |
| 1985 | Connecticut | 4–5 | 1–4 | T–5th | |
| 1986 | Connecticut | 8–3 | 5–2 | T–1st | |
| 1987 | Connecticut | 7–4 | 5–2 | 3rd | |
| 1988 | Connecticut | 7–4 | 4–4 | T–3rd | |
| 1989 | Connecticut | 8–3 | 6–2 | T–1st | |
| 1990 | Connecticut | 6–5 | 5–3 | T–2nd | |
| 1991 | Connecticut | 3–8 | 2–6 | T–7th | |
| 1992 | Connecticut | 5–6 | 4–4 | T–5th | |
| 1993 | Connecticut | 6–5 | 5–3 | 3rd (New England) | |
| Connecticut: | | 62–57 | 42–35 | | |
| Total: | | 62–57 | | | |
National championship Conference title Conference division title or championship game berth
