= 1984 Connecticut Huskies football team =

American college football season

1984 Connecticut Huskies football
- Conference: Yankee Conference
- Record: 3–8 (1–4 Yankee)
- Head coach: Tom Jackson (2nd season)
- Home stadium: Memorial Stadium

1984 Yankee Conference football standings
	Conf.					Overall
Team	W		L		T	W		L		T
No. 3 Rhode Island +^	4	–	1	–	0	10	–	3	–	0
No. 4 Boston University +^	4	–	1	–	0	9	–	3	–	0
No. 11 New Hampshire	3	–	2	–	0	9	–	2	–	0
Maine	2	–	3	–	0	5	–	6	–	0
Connecticut	1	–	4	–	0	3	–	8	–	0
UMass	1	–	4	–	0	3	–	8	–	0
+ – Conference co-champions; ^ – NCAA Division I-AA playoff participant; Rankings from NCAA Division I-AA Football Committee poll

The 1984 Connecticut Huskies football team represented the University of Connecticut in the 1984 NCAA Division I-AA football season. The Huskies were led by second-year head coach Tom Jackson, and completed the season with a record of 3–8.

== Schedule ==
Date	Opponent	Site	Result	Attendance	Source
September 8	Colgate*	Andy Kerr Stadium; Hamilton, NY	L 3–9	6,500	
September 15	Lehigh*	Memorial Stadium; Storrs, CT	L 7–10	4,821	
September 22	Morgan State*	Memorial Stadium; Storrs, CT	W 41–14	12,716	
September 29	at Yale*	Yale Bowl; New Haven, CT	W 20–0	32,318	
October 6	at New Hampshire	Cowell Stadium; Durham, NH	L 12–13	8,600	
October 13	at Lafayette*	Fisher Field; Easton, PA	L 0–10	11,300	
October 20	at No. 4 Holy Cross*	Fitton Field; Worcester, MA	L 0–41	20,659	
October 27	Maine	Memorial Stadium; Storrs, CT	L 10–13		
November 3	at UMass	Alumni Stadium; Amherst, MA (rivalry)	W 21–16		
November 10	No. 5 Boston University	Memorial Stadium; Storrs, CT	L 17–21	13,367	
November 17	No. T–6 Rhode Island	Memorial Stadium; Storrs, CT (rivalry)	L 19–29	10,446	
*Non-conference game; Rankings from NCAA Division I-AA Football Committee Poll released prior to the game

== Roster ==
1984 Connecticut Huskies football team roster
Players
Coaches
Offense

Pos.	#	Name	Class
WR	25	Brian McGillicuddy	Sr
RB	20	Billy Parks	Jr
OT	77	Craig Primiani	Jr
QB	7	Chris Riley	So
C	52	Chuck Ruslavage	Sr
FB	30	David Scott	Jr
WR	12	Scott Sweitzer	Jr
G	69	Kevin Ursa	Jr
TE	81	Mike Walsh	Jr
WR	16	Kane Winn	Sr
OT	79	Barry Word	Sr

Defense

Pos.	#	Name	Class
CB	9	Jerry McIntosh	Jr
DE	31	Mike McNamara	Jr
DE	34	Mark Michaels	Jr
LB	47	Ed Micklovic	Jr
LB	51	Norm Myers	Sr
LB		Eric Naposki	Fr
CB	5	Shane Porter	Sr
DT	74	Donald Smith	Jr

Special teams

Pos.	#	Name	Class
P	15	Doug Muh	Fr
K	6	John Pulek	So

Head coach

- Tom Jackson

Coordinators/assistant coaches

Legend

- (C) Team captain
- (S) Suspended
- (I) Ineligible
- Injured
- Redshirt
