= 1984 Boston University Terriers football team =

American college football season

1984 Boston University Terriers football

Yankee Conference co-champion

NCAA Division I-AA First Round, L 33–35 at Richmond
- Conference: Yankee Conference
- Record: 9–3 (4–1 Yankee)
- Head coach: Rick Taylor (8th season)
- Offensive coordinator: Buddy Teevens (4th season)
- Defensive coordinator: Ed Sweeney (7th season)
- Home stadium: Nickerson Field

1984 Yankee Conference football standings
| | Conf. | | | | | Overall |
| Team | W | | L | | T | W | | L | | T |
|---|---|---|---|---|---|---|---|---|---|---|
| No. 3 Rhode Island +^ | 4 | – | 1 | – | 0 | 10 | – | 3 | – | 0 |
| No. 4 Boston University +^ | 4 | – | 1 | – | 0 | 9 | – | 3 | – | 0 |
| No. 11 New Hampshire | 3 | – | 2 | – | 0 | 9 | – | 2 | – | 0 |
| Maine | 2 | – | 3 | – | 0 | 5 | – | 6 | – | 0 |
| Connecticut | 1 | – | 4 | – | 0 | 3 | – | 8 | – | 0 |
| UMass | 1 | – | 4 | – | 0 | 3 | – | 8 | – | 0 |
+ – Conference co-champions; ^ – NCAA Division I-AA playoff participant; Rankings from NCAA Division I-AA Football Committee poll

The 1984 Boston University Terriers football team was an American football team that represented Boston University as a member of the Yankee Conference during the 1984 NCAA Division I-AA football season. In their eighth season under head coach Rick Taylor, the Terriers compiled a 9–3 record (4–1 against conference opponents), tied for the Yankee Conference championship, lost to Richmond in the first round of the NCAA Division I-AA Football Championship playoffs, and outscored opponents by a total of 287 to 187.

== Schedule ==
| Date | Opponent | Rank | Site | Result | Attendance | Source |
|---|---|---|---|---|---|---|
| September 8 | vs. Grambling State* | | Yankee Stadium; Bronx, NY (Whitney Young Memorial Classic) | W 16–9 | 31,979 | |
| September 15 | Morgan State* | | Nickerson Field; Boston, MA | W 44–0 | 1,070 | |
| September 22 | at No. 20 New Hampshire | No. 7 | Cowell Stadium; Durham, NH | W 21–20 | | |
| September 29 | Maine | No. 8 | Nickerson Field; Boston, MA | W 27–10 | 5,533 | |
| October 6 | Delaware* | No. 5 | Nickerson Field; Boston, MA | W 27–3 | 4,303 | |
| October 13 | at William & Mary* | No. 5 | Cary Field; Williamsburg, VA | L 3–24 | 11,200 | |
| October 20 | at No. 11 Rhode Island | No. T–14 | Meade Stadium; Kingston, RI | L 7–22 | 13,052 | |
| October 27 | UMass | No. 18 | Nickerson Field; Boston, MA | W 31–21 | 3,161 | |
| November 3 | No. 2 Holy Cross* | No. 13 | Nickerson Field; Boston, MA | W 16–12 | 14,750 | |
| November 10 | at Connecticut | No. 5 | Memorial Stadium; Storrs, CT | W 21–17 | 13,367 | |
| November 17 | at VMI* | No. 5 | Alumni Memorial Field; Lexington, VA | W 41–14 | 4,200 | |
| November 24 | at No. 12 Richmond* | No. 4 | University of Richmond Stadium; Richmond, VA (NCAA Division I-AA First Round) | L 33–35 | | |
*Non-conference game; Rankings from NCAA Division I-AA Football Committee Poll released prior to the game
