= 1984 Weber State Wildcats football team =

American college football season

1984 Weber State Wildcats football
- Conference: Big Sky Conference
- Record: 5–6 (3–4 Big Sky)
- Head coach: Mike Price (4th season)
- Home stadium: Wildcat Stadium

1984 Big Sky Conference football standings
	Conf.					Overall
Team	W		L		T	W		L		T
No. 2 Montana State $^	6	–	1	–	0	12	–	2	–	0
Nevada	5	–	2	–	0	7	–	4	–	0
Boise State	4	–	3	–	0	6	–	5	–	0
Idaho	4	–	3	–	0	6	–	5	–	0
Idaho State	4	–	3	–	0	5	–	6	–	0
Weber State	3	–	4	–	0	5	–	6	–	0
Northern Arizona	2	–	5	–	0	4	–	6	–	0
Montana	0	–	7	–	0	2	–	8	–	1
$ – Conference champion; ^ – NCAA Division I-AA playoff participant; Rankings from NCAA Division I-AA Poll

The 1984 Weber State Wildcats football team represented Weber State College (now known as Weber State University) as a member of the Big Sky Conference during the 1984 NCAA Division I-AA football season. Led by fourth-year head coach Mike Price, the Wildcats compiled an overall record of 5–6, with a mark of 3–4 in conference play, and finished sixth in the Big Sky.

== Schedule ==
Date	Opponent	Site	Result	Attendance	Source
September 1	at Utah*	Robert Rice Stadium; Salt Lake City, UT	L 16–52	27,828	
September 8	Fort Lewis*	Wildcat Stadium; Ogden, UT	W 44–0		
September 15	at Northern Arizona	Walkup Skydome; Flagstaff, AZ	L 21–42		
September 22	at Portland State*	Civic Stadium; Portland, OR	L 24–27		
September 29	Montana	Wildcat Stadium; Ogden, UT	W 47–14	10,069	
October 6	Montana State	Wildcat Stadium; Ogden, UT	L 0–48	9,680	
October 13	at Idaho	Kibbie Dome; Moscow, ID	W 40–37	13,700	
October 20	Southern Utah*	Wildcat Stadium; Ogden, UT	W 29–10		
October 27	Nevada	Wildcat Stadium; Ogden, UT	L 21–35	5,621	
November 3	Idaho State	Wildcat Stadium; Ogden, UT	L 22–26		
November 10	at No. 17 Boise State	Bronco Stadium; Boise, ID	W 23–21	13,644	
*Non-conference game; Rankings from NCAA Division I-AA Football Committee Poll released prior to the game
