= 1984 Montana State Bobcats football team =

American college football season

1984 Montana State Bobcats football

NCAA Division I-AA champion Big Sky champion

NCAA Division I-AA Championship Game, W 19–6 vs. Louisiana Tech
- Conference: Big Sky Conference

Ranking
- AP: No. 2
- Record: 12–2 (6–1 Big Sky)
- Head coach: Dave Arnold (2nd season)
- Offensive coordinator: Bill Diedrick (1st season)
- Defensive coordinator: Steve Carson (1st season)
- Home stadium: Reno H. Sales Stadium

1984 Big Sky Conference football standings
	Conf.					Overall
Team	W		L		T	W		L		T
No. 2 Montana State $^	6	–	1	–	0	12	–	2	–	0
Nevada	5	–	2	–	0	7	–	4	–	0
Boise State	4	–	3	–	0	6	–	5	–	0
Idaho	4	–	3	–	0	6	–	5	–	0
Idaho State	4	–	3	–	0	5	–	6	–	0
Weber State	3	–	4	–	0	5	–	6	–	0
Northern Arizona	2	–	5	–	0	4	–	6	–	0
Montana	0	–	7	–	0	2	–	8	–	1
$ – Conference champion; ^ – NCAA Division I-AA playoff participant; Rankings from NCAA Division I-AA Poll

The 1984 Montana State Bobcats football team represented the Montana State University (MSU) in the 1984 NCAA Division I-AA football season. The team was led by Dave Arnold in his second season as a head coach. The Bobcats played their home games at Reno H. Sales Stadium.

After going 1–10 the previous season and finishing last in the Big Sky, the Bobcats had one of the biggest turnarounds in all of college football in 1984, finishing the regular season with an overall record of 9–2, including a 35–31 win over Division I-A Fresno State, and won the Big Sky title. The Bobcats received a bid to the Division I-AA playoffs, defeating Arkansas State and Rhode Island en route to the I-AA Championship Game. In the championship game, Montana State defeated Louisiana Tech 19–6 for the program's first I-AA national title, and first national title since the 1976 team won the NCAA Division II national championship. This would be the Bobcats' last national championship win until 2025.

== Schedule ==
Date	Opponent	Rank	Site	TV	Result	Attendance	Source
September 8	Mesa State*		Reno H. Sales Stadium; Bozeman, MT		W 30–14		
September 15	at Eastern Washington*		Joe Albi Stadium; Spokane, WA		L 16–21		
September 22	at Idaho		Kibbie Dome; Moscow, ID		W 34–28	11,600	
September 29	No. 18 Idaho State		Reno H. Sales Stadium; Bozeman, MT		L 6–22	11,117	
October 6	at Weber State		Wildcat Stadium; Ogden, UT		W 48–0	9,680	
October 13	Nevada		Reno H. Sales Stadium; Bozeman, MT		W 44–41 ^{4OT}	6,317	
October 20	Portland State*^{†}		Reno H. Sales Stadium; Bozeman, MT		W 45–22	10,797	
October 27	No. 8 Boise State		Reno H. Sales Stadium; Bozeman, MT		W 22–18	8,387	
November 3	at Montana	No. 15	Dornblaser Field; Missoula, MT (rivalry)		W 34–24	12,500	
November 10	Northern Arizona	No. 10	Reno H. Sales Stadium; Bozeman, MT		W 41–3	9,357	
November 17	at Fresno State*	No. 6	Bulldog Stadium; Fresno, CA		W 35–31	24,088	
December 1	No. 10 Arkansas State*	No. 2	Reno H. Sales Stadium; Bozeman, MT (NCAA Division I-AA Quarterfinal)		W 31–14	12,037	
December 8	No. 2 Rhode Island*	No. 2	Reno H. Sales Stadium; Bozeman, MT (NCAA Division I-AA Semifinal)		W 32–20	12,697	
December 15	vs. No. 9 Louisiana Tech*	No. 2	Johnson Hagood Stadium; Charleston, SC (NCAA Division I-AA Championship Game)	SPN	W 19–6	9,125	
*Non-conference game; ^{†}Homecoming; Rankings from NCAA Division I-AA Football Committee Poll released prior to the game

== Game summaries ==
=== Mesa State ===
	1	2	3	4	Total
Mavericks	7	0	0	7	14
Bobcats	20	0	7	3	30

=== Vs. No. 9 Louisiana Tech (Division I-AA Championship Game) ===
	1	2	3	4	Total
No. 9 Bulldogs	0	0	0	6	6
No. 2 Bobcats	9	10	0	0	19

== Roster ==
1984 Montana State Bobcats football team roster
Players
Coaches
Offense

Pos.	#	Name	Class
TE	86	Joe Bignell	Sr
QB	12	Kelly Bradley	So
FB	39	Jesse Jones	Jr
RB	4	Tim Clements	Jr
C	55	Robb Fellows	Sr
G	73	Bruce Randall	Jr
G	60	Todd Vasey	So
OT	74	Don Leake	So
OT	66	Bill Schmidt	Sr
WR	2	Tom White	Jr
WR	89	Brent Bateman	Sr
TE	24	Tom Malhum	Sr
WR	18	Kelly Davis	So
WR	44	Darin Dietrich	Jr
RB	33	David Pandt	Jr
FB	25	Eric Miller	Jr
FB	30	Toby Petty	Jr

Defense

Pos.	#	Name	Class
NG	59	Lonnie Burt	Sr
DT	71	Troy Timmer	Sr
DT	91	Pat "Tex" Sikora	Jr
DE	68	Mark Fellows	Sr
CAT	27	Clete Linebarger	Jr
LB	42	Kirk Timmer	So
LB	99	Greg Wilkes	Sr
FS	29	Doug Kimball	Jr
SS	47	Joe Roberts	Sr
CB	17	Derek Abell	So
CB	35	Rodney Holland	Sr
DT	58	Tom Jacobs	Fr
LB;ST	26	John Kitna	Jr
CB	43	William Johnson	Sr
FS	9	Tyler Winter	So
SS;ST	22	Steve King	So

Special teams

Pos.	#	Name	Class
P	3	Dirk Nelson	Sr
K	1	Mark Carter	Sr

Head coach

- Dave Arnold

Coordinators/assistant coaches

- Steve Carson (DC)
- Bill Diedrick (OC)
- J. G. Aegerter (OLB)
- Mike Kramer (ILB)

Legend

- (C) Team captain
- (S) Suspended
- (I) Ineligible
- Injured
- Redshirt
