= Tom Ehrhardt =

American football player (born c. 1963)

No. 12
- Position: Quarterback

Personal information
- Born: c. 1963 (age 62–63); Queens, New York, U.S.
- Listed height: 6 ft 3 in (1.91 m)
- Listed weight: 206 lb (93 kg)

Career information
- High school: Holy Cross (Flushing, Queens)
- College: C. W. Post (1981–1982); Rhode Island (1983–1985)
- NFL draft: 1986: undrafted

Career history
- New York Jets (1986)*; Cincinnati Bengals (1987)*
- * Offseason or practice squad member only

Awards and highlights
- ECAC Hall of Fame (2016); Rhode Island Hall of Fame (1996); Yankee Conference Player of the Year (1984, 1985); First-team All-American (1984, 1985); First-team All-New England (1984, 1985); First-team All-Yankee Conference (1984, 1985); ECAC Division II Rookie of the Year (1981); Rhode Island Rams No. 12 retired

Thomas E. Ehrhardt (born c. 1963) is an American former football quarterback. He played college football for the C. W. Post Pioneers and Rhode Island Rams. After going undrafted in the 1986 NFL draft, he signed with the New York Jets of the National Football League (NFL). He also played for the Cincinnati Bengals. His number twelve jersey is retired by the Rhode Island Rams.

== Early life ==
Ehrhardt was born in Queens, New York, and attended Holy Cross High School in Flushing, Queens. He played high school football in Flushing as a quarterback. He was a one-year starter for the school and lead them to the Catholic High School Football League championship game and was also named as a New York Newsday All-Queens selection in 1980.

== College career ==
=== C. W. Post ===
Ehrhardt began his college football career at C. W. Post. As a true freshman in 1981, he threw for 2,179 yards and twenty touchdowns. In his last game for the Pioneers, he threw for 432 yards and six touchdowns against Merchant Marine. He led the team to a 7–4 record. After the season he was named as the ECAC Rookie of the Year.

Ehrhardt's sophomore season in 1982 was less impressive as he led the team to a 3–7 record along with getting sacked 26 times. After C. W. Post announced that it was dropping down to Division III, he decided to transfer.

=== Rhode Island ===
In September 1983, Ehrhardt transferred to Rhode Island and had to take a redshirt season due to NCAA transfer rules.

In 1984, Ehrhardt led the Rams to a 10–3 record and were named co-conference champions of the Yankee Conference. During his junior season, he earned the nickname Ehr Force due to how much the team threw the ball. He threw for 3,180 yards and thirty touchdowns during the regular season, which were all Yankee Conference single season records. He finished the season with 3,870 yards and 36 touchdowns. Following the season, he was named as the conference's Offensive Player of the Year.

After being chosen to finish last in the conference last season, the Rams began the season poised to win the conference. Ehrhardt was injured during the first game and missed the second game of the 1985 season. In the first half against New Hampshire on November 2, he partially collapsed his lung in the first half. Despite his injury, he still threw for 446 yards and three touchdowns. Against Connecticut, Ehrhardt threw for eight touchdown passes which is a school record. In the first round of the NCAA Division I-AA football playoffs he completed 43 of his seventy pass attempts for 472 yards and five touchdowns in the team's 35–26 victory over No. 10 Akron. During that game he set the New England passing record for touchdown passes in a season with forty and most attempts and completions in a game.

=== Statistics ===
Year	Team	Games		Passing							
Year	Team	GP	Record	Comp	Att	Pct	Yards	Avg	TD	Int	Rate
1981	C. W. Post	11	7–4	166	295	56.3	2,179	7.4	20	16	129.8
1982	C. W. Post	10	3–7	141	278	50.7	1,424	5.1	7	16	90.5
1983	Rhode Island	DNP									
1984	Rhode Island	13	10–3	308	536	57.5	3,870	7.2	36	19	133.2
1985	Rhode Island	12	9–3	365	645	56.6	4,508	7.0	42	27	128.4
Career		46	29−17	980	1,754	55.9	11,981	6.8	105	78	124.1

== Professional career ==
On May 3, 1986, after going undrafted in the 1986 NFL draft, Ehrhardt signed with the New York Jets of the National Football League (NFL). He appeared in one preseason game before being released.

On February 7, 1987, Ehrhardt signed with the Cincinnati Bengals. He was waived on September 9, 1987

== Personal life ==
Ehrhardt has three brothers and three sisters. His brother, Bobby, was also a quarterback for Rhode Island. Their father died in 1969.
