= 1984 Boise State Broncos football team =

American college football season

1984 Boise State Broncos football
- Conference: Big Sky Conference
- Record: 6–5 (4–3 Big Sky)
- Head coach: Lyle Setencich (2nd season)
- Defensive coordinator: Phil Snow (2nd season)
- Home stadium: Bronco Stadium

1984 Big Sky Conference football standings
	Conf.					Overall
Team	W		L		T	W		L		T
No. 2 Montana State $^	6	–	1	–	0	12	–	2	–	0
Nevada	5	–	2	–	0	7	–	4	–	0
Boise State	4	–	3	–	0	6	–	5	–	0
Idaho	4	–	3	–	0	6	–	5	–	0
Idaho State	4	–	3	–	0	5	–	6	–	0
Weber State	3	–	4	–	0	5	–	6	–	0
Northern Arizona	2	–	5	–	0	4	–	6	–	0
Montana	0	–	7	–	0	2	–	8	–	1
$ – Conference champion; ^ – NCAA Division I-AA playoff participant; Rankings from NCAA Division I-AA Poll

The 1984 Boise State Broncos football team represented Boise State University as a member of Big Sky Conference during the 1984 NCAA Division I-AA football season. Led by second-year head coach Lyle Setencich, the Broncos compiled an overall record of 6–5 with a mark of 4–3 in conference play, placing in a three-way tie for third in the Big Sky. Boise State played home games on campus, at Bronco Stadium in Boise, Idaho.

== Schedule ==
Date	Time	Opponent	Rank	Site	Result	Attendance	Source
September 1	7:00 pm	Cal State Fullerton*		Bronco Stadium; Boise, ID	L 25–27	16,845	
September 8	7:00 pm	Fresno State*		Bronco Stadium; Boise, ID (rivalry)	L 21–37	19,252	
September 22	7:00 pm	Nevada		Bronco Stadium; Boise, ID (rivalry)	W 37–12	21,521	
September 29	7:00 pm	Eastern Washington*		Bronco Stadium; Boise, ID	W 45–17	17,145	
October 6		at No. 17 Idaho State		ASISU Minidome; Pocatello, ID	W 26–23	12,176	
October 13		at Northern Arizona	No. 15	Walkup Skydome; Flagstaff, AZ	W 14–12	13,125	
October 20		Montana	No. 14	Bronco Stadium; Boise, ID	W 35–7	17,282	
October 27		at Montana State	No. 8	Reno H. Sales Stadium; Bozeman, MT	L 18–22	8,387	
November 3		at Cal Poly*		Mustang Stadium; San Luis Obispo, CA	W 14–10	3,975	
November 10	1:30 pm	Weber State	No. 17	Bronco Stadium; Boise, ID	L 21–23	13,644	
November 17	1:30 pm	Idaho		Bronco Stadium; Boise, ID (rivalry)	L 0–37	20,430	
*Non-conference game; Rankings from NCAA Division I-AA Football Committee Poll released prior to the game; All times are in Mountain time

== Roster ==
1984 Boise State Broncos football team roster
Players
Coaches
Offense

Pos.	#	Name	Class
QB	1	Todd Anderson
RB	4	Jon Francis	Jr
QB	10	Hazsen Choates	So
WR	11	Eric Andrade	So
QB	13	Gerald DesPres	Sr
WR	16	Tony Hunter	Jr
RB	36	Dean Collins
FB	38	Andy Regimbal	Jr
C	53	Scott Baker	So
G	61	Tom DeWitz	Fr
G	62	Steve Despot	Jr
OT	72	Barry Black	So
OT	73	John Kilgo	Jr
WR	85	Pat Fitzgerald	Jr
TE	89	Kim Metcalf	Sr

Defense

Pos.	#	Name	Class
FS	7	Steve Harris	Jr
SS	15	Phil Bartle	So
CB	22	Jim Voulelis	Sr
CB	32	Chuck Compton	Jr
DE	48	Mark Wulff	Sr
LB	55	Carl Keever	Sr
LB	57	Glenn Simonton	Sr
LB	58	Jim Ellis	So
DT	79	Mark Thornton	Jr
DE	91	Chuck Gross	Jr
DT	92	Mike Johnson	Jr

Special teams

Pos.	#	Name	Class
K	9	Larry Hunter
P	88	Ron Talbot	Jr

Head coach

- Lyle Setencich (2nd year)

Coordinators/assistant coaches

- Phil Snow (DC)

Legend

- (C) Team captain
- (S) Suspended
- (I) Ineligible
- Injured
- Redshirt
