= 1984 Nevada Wolf Pack football team =

American college football season

1984 Nevada Wolf Pack football
- Conference: Big Sky Conference
- Record: 7–4 (5–2 Big Sky)
- Head coach: Chris Ault (9th season)
- Defensive coordinator: Bill Miller (2nd season)
- Home stadium: Mackay Stadium

1984 Big Sky Conference football standings
	Conf.					Overall
Team	W		L		T	W		L		T
No. 2 Montana State $^	6	–	1	–	0	12	–	2	–	0
Nevada	5	–	2	–	0	7	–	4	–	0
Boise State	4	–	3	–	0	6	–	5	–	0
Idaho	4	–	3	–	0	6	–	5	–	0
Idaho State	4	–	3	–	0	5	–	6	–	0
Weber State	3	–	4	–	0	5	–	6	–	0
Northern Arizona	2	–	5	–	0	4	–	6	–	0
Montana	0	–	7	–	0	2	–	8	–	1
$ – Conference champion; ^ – NCAA Division I-AA playoff participant; Rankings from NCAA Division I-AA Poll

The 1984 Nevada Wolf Pack football team represented the University of Nevada, Reno during the 1984 NCAA Division I-AA football season. Nevada competed as a member of the Big Sky Conference (BSC). The Wolf Pack were led by ninth-year head coach Chris Ault and played their home games at Mackay Stadium.

== Schedule ==
Date	Opponent	Site	Result	Attendance	Source
September 8	at Pacific (CA)*	Pacific Memorial Stadium; Stockton, CA	L 7–12	23,857	
September 15	Texas A&I*	Mackay Stadium; Reno, NV	W 61–35	8,523	
September 22	at Boise State	Bronco Stadium; Boise, ID (rivalry)	L 12–37	21,521	
September 29	Northern Arizona	Mackay Stadium; Reno, NV	W 37–20	9,169	
October 6	Idaho	Mackay Stadium; Reno, NV	W 23–17	9,525	
October 13	at Montana State	Reno H. Sales Stadium; Bozeman, MT	L 41–44 ^{4OT}	6,317	
October 20	Cal State Fullerton*^{†}	Mackay Stadium; Reno, NV	L 14–36	11,026	
October 27	at Weber State	Wildcat Stadium; Ogden, UT	W 35–21	5,621	
November 3	Eastern Washington*	Mackay Stadium; Reno, NV	W 35–21	8,222	
November 10	Montana	Mackay Stadium; Reno, NV	W 31–28	6,845	
November 17	at Idaho State	ASISU Minidome; Pocatello, ID	W 29–27	7,144	
*Non-conference game; ^{†}Homecoming
