= 1984 Northern Arizona Lumberjacks football team =

American college football season

1984 Northern Arizona Lumberjacks football
- Conference: Big Sky Conference
- Record: 4–6 (2–5 Big Sky)
- Head coach: Joe Harper (3rd season)
- Home stadium: Walkup Skydome

1984 Big Sky Conference football standings
	Conf.					Overall
Team	W		L		T	W		L		T
No. 2 Montana State $^	6	–	1	–	0	12	–	2	–	0
Nevada	5	–	2	–	0	7	–	4	–	0
Boise State	4	–	3	–	0	6	–	5	–	0
Idaho	4	–	3	–	0	6	–	5	–	0
Idaho State	4	–	3	–	0	5	–	6	–	0
Weber State	3	–	4	–	0	5	–	6	–	0
Northern Arizona	2	–	5	–	0	4	–	6	–	0
Montana	0	–	7	–	0	2	–	8	–	1
$ – Conference champion; ^ – NCAA Division I-AA playoff participant; Rankings from NCAA Division I-AA Poll

The 1984 Northern Arizona Lumberjacks football team represented Northern Arizona University as a member of the Big Sky Conference during the 1984 NCAA Division I-AA football season. Led by third-year head coach Joe Harper, the Lumberjacks compiled an overall record of 4–6, with a mark of 2–5 in conference play, and finished seventh in the Big Sky.

The October 27 game against the University of Manitoba was an exhibition game and not included in the Lumberjacks' overall record for the season.

== Schedule ==
Date	Opponent	Site	Result	Attendance	Source
September 1	vs. New Mexico Highlands*	Judd Avery Memorial Field; Fort Defiance, AZ	W 64–0	2,000	
September 8	Cal State Northridge*	Walkup Skydome; Flagstaff, AZ	W 26–10	9,145–9,600	
September 15	Weber State	Walkup Skydome; Flagstaff, AZ	W 42–21		
September 22	Pacific (CA)*	Walkup Skydome; Flagstaff, AZ	L 28–38		
September 29	at Nevada	Mackay Stadium; Reno, NV	L 20–37	9,169	
October 6	at Montana	Dornblaser Field; Missoula, MT	W 24–18	7,332	
October 13	No. 15 Boise State	Walkup Skydome; Flagstaff, AZ	L 12–14	13,125	
October 20	Idaho State	Walkup Skydome; Flagstaff, AZ	L 15–29	13,100	
October 27	Manitoba*	Walkup Skydome; Flagstaff, AZ	W 42–14	2,800	
November 3	at Idaho	Kibbie Dome; Moscow, ID	L 9–37	7,500	
November 10	at No. 10 Montana State	Reno H. Sales Stadium; Bozeman, MT	L 3–41	9,357	
*Non-conference game; Rankings from NCAA Division I-AA Football Committee Poll released prior to the game
