= Kirk Timmer =

American football player (born 1963)

No. 59
- Position: Linebacker

Personal information
- Born: December 18, 1963 (age 62); Butte, Montana, U.S.
- Listed height: 6 ft 3 in (1.91 m)
- Listed weight: 242 lb (110 kg)

Career information
- High school: Jefferson (MT)
- College: Montana State
- NFL draft: 1987: 11th round, 300th overall pick

Career history
- New York Jets (1987)*; Dallas Cowboys (1987)
- * Offseason or practice squad member only

Awards and highlights
- All-Big Sky (1984); Second-team All-Big Sky (1986)

Career NFL statistics
- Games played: 1
- Stats at Pro Football Reference

Kirk Richard Timmer (born December 18, 1963) is an American former professional football player who was a linebacker in the National Football League (NFL) for the Dallas Cowboys. He played college football for the Montana State Bobcats.

== Early life ==
Timmer attended Jefferson High School. He accepted a football scholarship from Montana State University, following the footsteps of his older brother Troy, who was a defensive tackle. As a redshirt freshman, he also played alongside his teammate Jim Kalafat at middle linebacker.

As a sophomore, he led the team with 138 tackles, while contributing to the school winning the Division I-AA National Championship with a 12-2 record. He also set a single-game school record with 18 tackles against Arkansas State University.

As a senior, he posted 137 tackles and 3 forced fumbles. He left as the school's all-time leader in career tackles (519) and was inducted into the MSU Athletics Hall of Fame.

== Professional career ==
Timmer was selected by the New York Jets in the 11th round (300th overall) of the 1987 NFL draft. He was tried at left inside linebacker during training camp. He was waived before the start of the season on August 27.

After the NFLPA strike was declared on the third week of the season, those contests were canceled (reducing the 16 game season to 15) and the NFL decided that the games would be played with replacement players. In September, he was signed to be a part of the Dallas replacement team that was given the mock name "Rhinestone Cowboys" by the media. He appeared in 1 game as a backup at middle linebacker behind Russ Swan, before being released.

== Personal life ==
Timmer married Kelly Angelos, a guard on the Montana State University women's basketball team.
