= Calvin Loveall =

American football player (born 1962)

No. 22, 27
- Position: Defensive back

Personal information
- Born: July 23, 1962 (age 64); Kennewick, Washington
- Listed height: 5 ft 9 in (1.75 m)
- Listed weight: 180 lb (82 kg)

Career information
- High school: Kennewick (WA)
- College: Idaho

Career history
- Denver Gold (1985); Ottawa Rough Riders (1986–1987); Houston Oilers (1988); Kansas City Chiefs (1988); Atlanta Falcons (1988)
- Stats at Pro Football Reference

Calvin Loveall (born July 23, 1962) is an American former football defensive back. He played for the Atlanta Falcons, Kansas City Chiefs and Houston Oilers in 1988.
